= 2024 Texas Longhorns football team =

American college football season

2024 Texas Longhorns football

Peach Bowl champion

SEC Championship Game, L 19–22 ^{OT} vs. Georgia

CFP First Round, W 38–24 vs. Clemson Peach Bowl (CFP Quarterfinal), W 39–31 ^{2OT} vs. Arizona State Cotton Bowl (CFP Semifinal), L 14–28 vs. Ohio State
- Conference: Southeastern Conference

Ranking
- Coaches: No. 3
- AP: No. 4
- Record: 13–3 (7–1 SEC)
- Head coach: Steve Sarkisian (4th season)
- Offensive coordinator: Kyle Flood (4th season)
- Co-offensive coordinator: A. J. Milwee (4th season)
- Offensive scheme: Pro spread
- Defensive coordinator: Pete Kwiatkowski (4th season)
- Co-defensive coordinator: Johnny Nansen (1st season)
- Base defense: 4–2–5
- Home stadium: Darrell K Royal–Texas Memorial Stadium

Uniform
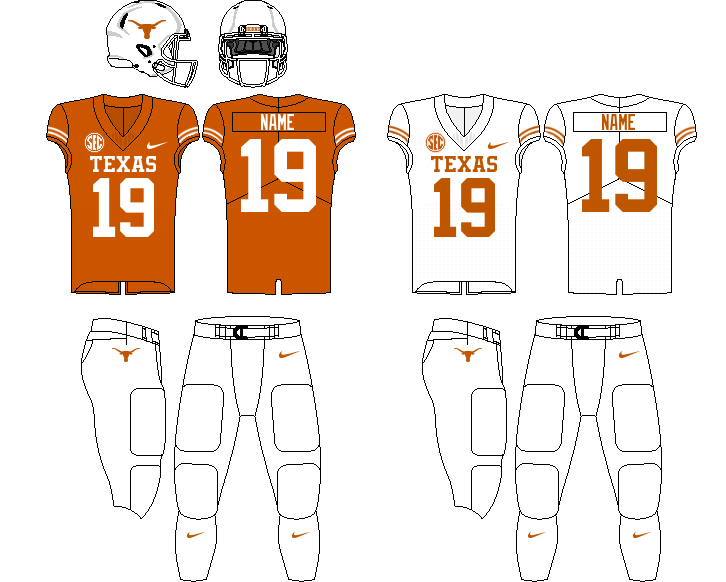

2024 Southeastern Conference football standings
	Conf.			Overall
Team	W		L	W		L
No. 4 Texas y^	7	–	1	13	–	3
No. 6 Georgia y$^	6	–	2	11	–	3
No. 9 Tennessee ^	6	–	2	10	–	3
No. 22 Missouri	5	–	3	10	–	3
No. 11 Ole Miss	5	–	3	10	–	3
No. 17 Alabama	5	–	3	9	–	4
No. 19 South Carolina	5	–	3	9	–	4
LSU	5	–	3	9	–	4
Texas A&M	5	–	3	8	–	5
Florida	4	–	4	8	–	5
Arkansas	3	–	5	7	–	6
Vanderbilt	3	–	5	7	–	6
Oklahoma	2	–	6	6	–	7
Auburn	2	–	6	5	–	7
Kentucky	1	–	7	4	–	8
Mississippi State	0	–	8	2	–	10
Championship: Georgia 22, Texas 19 ^{OT}
^ – College Football Playoff participant; $ – Conference champion; y – Championship game participant; Rankings from AP Poll

The 2024 Texas Longhorns football team represented the University of Texas at Austin as a member of the Southeastern Conference (SEC) during the 2024 NCAA Division I FBS football season. They were led by fourth-year head coach Steve Sarkisian. The Longhorns played their home games at Darrell K Royal–Texas Memorial Stadium in Austin, Texas. This was the Longhorns first season as a member of the SEC.

On September 15, the Longhorns were ranked No. 1 in the Associated Press poll (AP Top 25) for the first time since 2008.

After the season, twelve Longhorn players were selected in the 2025 NFL draft, setting a program record.

== Offseason ==
Positions key
Offense	Defense	Special teams
QB — Quarterback; RB — Running back; FB — Fullback; WR — Wide receiver; TE — Tight end; OL — Offensive lineman; T — Tackle; G — Guard; C — Center	DL — Defensive lineman; DT — Defensive tackle (Note: Includes nose tackle (NT)); DE — Defensive end; EDGE — Edge rusher; LB — Linebacker (Note: Includes middle linebacker (MLB/MIKE), weakside linebacker (WILL), strongside linebacker (SAM), off-ball linebacker, and outside linebacker (OLB)); DB — Defensive back; CB — Cornerback; S — Safety (Note: Includes free safety (FS) and strong safety (SS))	K — Kicker (Note: Also known as a placekicker (PK)); P — Punter; LS — Long snapper; RS — Return specialist (Note: Includes kickoff and punt returners)

=== Departures ===
==== Team departures ====
2024 Texas Offseason departures
Name	Number	Pos.	Height	Weight	Year	Hometown	Notes
Adonai Mitchell	5	WR	6'4"	196 lbs	Junior	Missouri City, TX	NFL draft
Byron Murphy II	90	DL	6'1"	308 lbs	Junior	DeSoto, TX	NFL draft
Christian Jones	70	OL	6'6"	321 lbs	Senior	Cypress, TX	NFL draft
Gabriel Lozano	96	K	6'1"	185 lbs	Redshirt Senior	Austin, TX	Graduated
Gus Asel	82	TE	6'1"	226 lbs	Senior	Frisco, TX	Graduated
Ja'Tavion Sanders	0	TE	6'4"	243 lbs	Junior	Denton, TX	NFL draft
Jaylan Ford	41	LB	6'3"	242 lbs	Senior	Frisco, TX	NFL draft
Jett Bush	43	LB	6'2"	242 lbs	Senior	Houston, TX	Graduated
Jonathon Brooks	24	RB	6'0"	207 lbs	Senior	Hallettsville, TX	NFL draft
Jordan Whittington	13	WR	6'1"	204 lbs	Senior	Cuero, TX	NFL draft
Keilan Robinson	7	RB	5'9"	188 lbs	Senior	Washington D.C.	NFL draft
Patrick Bayouth	48	TE	6'4"	281 lbs	Senior	Bellaire, TX	Graduated
Paxton Anderson	86	WR	6'4"	213 lbs	Senior	Dallas, TX	Graduated
Ryan Sanborn	27	P	6'3"	211 lbs	Senior	San Diego, CA	Graduated
Ryan Watts	6	DB	6'3"	206 lbs	Senior	Little Elm, TX	NFL draft
T'Vondre Sweat	93	DL	6'4"	362 lbs	Senior	Huntsville, TX	NFL draft
Tannahill Love	44	LB	5'11"	225 lbs	Senior	Fort Worth, TX	Graduated
Xavier Worthy	1	WR	6'1"	172 lbs	Junior	Fresno, CA	NFL draft

==== Outgoing transfers ====
Name	No.	Pos.	Height	Weight	Hometown	Year	New school	Source
Austin Jordan	4	DB	6'0"	198	Denton, TX	Sophomore	TCU	
Billy Walton III	30	EDGE	6'2"	215	Dallas, TX	Freshman	SMU	
B.J. Allen Jr.	7	DB	6'1"	205	Aledo, TX	Redshirt Freshman	North Texas	
Casey Cain	8	WR	6'3"	197	New Orleans, LA	Sophomore	UNLV	
Charles Wright	14	QB	6'1"	203	Austin, TX	Sophomore	Appalachian State	
Derrian Brown	24	RB	5'10"	180	Buford, GA	Redshirt Senior	—	
Isaiah Neyor	9	WR	6'3"	215	Fort Worth, TX	Senior	Nebraska	
J'Mond Tapp	17	EDGE	6'3"	266	Donaldsonville, LA	Sophomore	Arizona State	
Jalen Catalon	11	DB	5'10"	202	Mansfield, TX	Senior	UNLV	
Jerrin Thompson	28	DB	6'0"	191	Lufkin, TX	Senior	Auburn	
Kitan Crawford	21	DB	5'11"	200	Tyler, TX	Senior	Nevada	
Kristopher Ross	97	DL	6'3"	280	Houston, TX	Redshirt Freshman	Nevada	
Ky Woods	29	RB	5'9"	175	League City, TX	Sophomore	Nevada	
Larry Turner-Gooden	13	DB	6'0"	204	Los Angeles, CA	Redshirt Freshman	San Jose State	
Maalik Murphy	6	QB	6'5"	238	Inglewood, CA	Redshirt Freshman	Duke	
Payton Kirkland	71	OL	6'6"	350	Orlando, FL	Freshman	Colorado	
Reed Malphurs	43	K	6'6"	194	Dallas, TX	Freshman	Tulsa	
S'Maje Burrell	15	LB	6'0"	219	Fort Worth, TX	Redshirt Freshman	Sam Houston	
Savion Red	17	RB	5'10"	214	Grand Prairie, TX	Sophomore	Nevada	
Sawyer Goram-Welch	61	OL	6'4"	307	Longview, TX	Junior	Coastal Carolina	
Terrance Brooks	8	CB	6'0"	200	Little Elm, TX	Sophomore	Illinois	
Trill Carter	98	DL	6'2"	300	Leesburg, GA	Senior	Auburn	
X'Avion Brice	14	DB	6'1"	183	Arlington, TX	Redshirt Freshman	North Texas	
Zac Swanson	96	DL	6'4"	255	Phoenix, AZ	Redshirt Freshman	Arizona State	

Note: Players with a dash in the new school column didn't land on a new team for the 2024 season.

==== Coaching staff departures ====
Name	Position	New Team	New Position	Source
Jeff Choate	Co-DC/ILB	Nevada	Head Coach	
Bo Davis	DL	LSU	DL	

=== Acquisitions ===
==== Incoming transfers ====
Name	Pos.	Height	Weight	Hometown	Year	Previous school	Source
Amari Niblack	TE	6'4"	233	Saint Petersburg, FL	Sophomore	Alabama	
Andrew Mukuba	S	6'0"	195	Austin, TX	Junior	Clemson	
Isaiah Bond	WR	5'11"	182	Buford, GA	Junior	Alabama	
Jay'Vion Cole	DB	5'10"	180	Oakland, CA	Junior	San Jose State	
Jermayne Lole	DL	6'3"	310	Long Beach, CA	Graduate	Louisville	
Matthew Golden	WR	6'0"	190	Houston, TX	Junior	Houston	
Silas Bolden	WR	5'8"	157	Rancho Cucamonga, CA	Junior	Oregon State	
Tiaoalii Savea	DL	6'4"	305	Las Vegas, NV	Senior	Arizona	
Trey Moore	DE	6'3"	235	San Antonio, TX	Sophomore	UTSA	
William Norton	DL	6'6"	325	Memphis, TN	Senior	Arizona	

==== 2024 recruits ====
College recruiting
Name	Hometown	School	Height	Weight	Commit date
Colin Simmons; LB	Duncanville, TX	Duncanville High School	6 ft 3 in (1.91 m)	225 lb (102 kg)	Aug 10, 2023
Colin Simmons; LB	Recruit ratings: Rivals: 247Sports: ESPN: (90)				
Kobe Black; DB	Waco, TX	Connally High School	6 ft 0 in (1.83 m)	190 lb (86 kg)	Dec 13, 2023
Kobe Black; DB	Recruit ratings: Rivals: 247Sports: ESPN: (89)				
Ryan Wingo; WR	St. Louis, MO	St. Louis University High School	6 ft 2 in (1.88 m)	205 lb (93 kg)	Oct 25, 2023
Ryan Wingo; WR	Recruit ratings: Rivals: 247Sports: ESPN: (87)				
Jerrick Gibson; RB	Gainesville, FL	IMG Academy	5 ft 10 in (1.78 m)	200 lb (91 kg)	Jun 24, 2023
Jerrick Gibson; RB	Recruit ratings: Rivals: 247Sports: ESPN: (87)				
Brandon Baker; OL	Santa Ana, CA	Mater Dei High School	6 ft 5 in (1.96 m)	285 lb (129 kg)	Sep 24, 2023
Brandon Baker; OL	Recruit ratings: Rivals: 247Sports: ESPN: (86)				
Xavier Filsaime; S	McKinney, TX	McKinney High School	6 ft 1 in (1.85 m)	180 lb (82 kg)	Dec 18, 2023
Xavier Filsaime; S	Recruit ratings: Rivals: 247Sports: ESPN: (86)				
Jordon Johnson-Rubell; DB	Fort Worth, TX	IMG Academy	5 ft 10 in (1.78 m)	180 lb (82 kg)	Jul 1, 2023
Jordon Johnson-Rubell; DB	Recruit ratings: Rivals: 247Sports: ESPN: (84)				
Aaron Butler; WR	Calabasas, CA	Calabasas High School	6 ft 0 in (1.83 m)	170 lb (77 kg)	Dec 22, 2023
Aaron Butler; WR	Recruit ratings: Rivals: 247Sports: ESPN: (84)				
Freddie Dubose; WR	Spring Branch, TX	Smithson Valley High School	6 ft 1 in (1.85 m)	170 lb (77 kg)	Jun 18, 2023
Freddie Dubose; WR	Recruit ratings: Rivals: 247Sports: ESPN: (82)				
Zina Umeozulu; EDGE	Allen, TX	Allen High School	6 ft 4 in (1.93 m)	210 lb (95 kg)	Sep 6, 2023
Zina Umeozulu; EDGE	Recruit ratings: Rivals: 247Sports: ESPN: (82)				
Parker Livingstone; WR	Lucas, TX	Lovejoy High School	6 ft 3 in (1.91 m)	185 lb (84 kg)	Jul 1, 2023
Parker Livingstone; WR	Recruit ratings: Rivals: 247Sports: ESPN: (82)				
Wardell Mack; S	Marrero, LA	Atascocita High School	5 ft 11 in (1.80 m)	170 lb (77 kg)	Nov 12, 2023
Wardell Mack; S	Recruit ratings: Rivals: 247Sports: ESPN: (81)				
Nate Kibble; OL	Humble, TX	Atascocita High School	6 ft 2.5 in (1.89 m)	315 lb (143 kg)	Jun 25, 2023
Nate Kibble; OL	Recruit ratings: Rivals: 247Sports: ESPN: (81)				
Daniel Cruz; OL	North Richland Hills, TX	Richland High School	6 ft 3.5 in (1.92 m)	295 lb (134 kg)	Jun 28, 2023
Daniel Cruz; OL	Recruit ratings: Rivals: 247Sports: ESPN: (80)				
Christian Clark; RB	Phoenix, AZ	Mountain Pointe High School	6 ft 0 in (1.83 m)	195 lb (88 kg)	Jun 22, 2023
Christian Clark; RB	Recruit ratings: Rivals: 247Sports: ESPN: (80)				
Tyanthony Smith; LB	Jasper, TX	Jasper High School	6 ft 1 in (1.85 m)	205 lb (93 kg)	Dec 20, 2023
Tyanthony Smith; LB	Recruit ratings: Rivals: 247Sports: ESPN: (79)				
Trey Owens; QB	Cypress, TX	Cy-Fair High School	6 ft 4.5 in (1.94 m)	200 lb (91 kg)	Jan 11, 2023
Trey Owens; QB	Recruit ratings: Rivals: 247Sports: ESPN: (79)				
Santana Wilson; DB	Scottsdale, AZ	Desert Mountain High School	6 ft 0 in (1.83 m)	180 lb (82 kg)	Jun 17, 2023
Santana Wilson; DB	Recruit ratings: Rivals: 247Sports: ESPN: (79)				
Jordan Washington; TE	Houston, TX	Langham Creek High School	6 ft 4 in (1.93 m)	225 lb (102 kg)	Jul 4, 2023
Jordan Washington; TE	Recruit ratings: Rivals: 247Sports: ESPN: (78)				
Melvin Hills; DL	Lafayette, LA	Lafayette Christian Academy	6 ft 3 in (1.91 m)	270 lb (120 kg)	Jul 12, 2023
Melvin Hills; DL	Recruit ratings: Rivals: 247Sports: ESPN: (78)				
Alex January; DL	Duncanville, TX	Duncanville High School	6 ft 4 in (1.93 m)	325 lb (147 kg)	Jul 12, 2023
Alex January; DL	Recruit ratings: Rivals: 247Sports: ESPN: (78)				
Michael Kern; P	Fort Lauderdale, FL	St. Thomas Aquinas High School	6 ft 3 in (1.91 m)	165 lb (75 kg)	May 2, 2023
Michael Kern; P	Recruit ratings: Rivals: 247Sports: ESPN: (N/A)				
Overall recruit ranking: Rivals: 3 247Sports: 5
Note: In many cases, Scout, Rivals, 247Sports, On3, and ESPN may conflict in their listings of height and weight.; In these cases, the average was taken. ESPN grades are on a 100-point scale.; Sources: "Rivals commits". Rivals.; "ESPN commits". ESPN.; "2024 Team Ranking". Rivals.com.; "247Sports commits". 247Sports.

==== 2024 overall class ranking ====
Website	National rank	Conference rank	5 star recruits	4 star recruits	3 star recruits	2 star recruits	1 star recruits	No star ranking
On3 Recruits	#6	#3	1	16	5	0	0	0
Rivals	#3	#3	3	14	4	1	0	0
247 Sports	#5	#3	2	9	11	0	0	0
ESPN	—	—	2	14	6	0	0	0

==== Walk-ons ====
Name	Pos.	Height	Weight	Hometown	High school
McCoy Bruce	DB	5'10"	175	Boerne, TX	Boerne High School
Eric Garza	LB	5'11"	210	Southlake, TX	Carroll Senior High School
Hudson Powell	WR	6'6"	186	Austin, TX	Regents School of Austin
Jackson Duffey	DB	5'11"	175	Spring Branch, TX	Smithson Valley High School
Reid Watkins	RB	5'11"	195	Fort Worth, TX	All Saints Episcopal School
Ridge Barker	TE	6'4"	250	Lucas, TX	Lovejoy High School
Spencer Barnett	K	6'0"	205	Austin, TX	Westlake High School
Velton Gardner	RB	5'9"	190	Dallas, TX	Skyline High School

==== Coaching staff additions ====
Name	New Position	Previous Team	Previous Position	Source
Johnny Nansen	Co-DC/ILB	Arizona	DC	
Kenny Baker	DL	Miami Dolphins	Assistant DL	

=== NFL draft combine ===
2024 NFL Combine Participants
Name	POS	HT	WT	Arms	Hands	40	Bench press	Vert jump	Broad jump	3 cone drill	20-yd Shuttle	10-yd split	Ref
Adonai Mitchell	WR	6'2"	205 lbs	32 3/8"	9"	4.34	DNP	39.5"	11'4"	DNP	DNP	1.52	
Byron Murphy II	DL	6'0 1/2"	297 lbs	32 3/8"	10 1/4"	4.87	28 Reps	33"	9'3"	DNP	DNP	1.69	
Christian Jones	OT	6'5"	305 lbs	34 1/2"	10 5/8"	5.04	DNP	DNP	DNP	8.09	4.78	DNP	
Ja'Tavion Sanders	TE	6'4"	245 lbs	32 7/8"	10 1/8"	4.69	DNP	DNP	DNP	DNP	4.32	1.59	
Jaylan Ford	LB	6'2"	240 lbs	31 3/4"	9 1/2"	DNP	DNP	33.5"	10'1"	DNP	DNP	DNP	
Jonathon Brooks	RB	6'0"	216 lbs	31 1/2"	9 1/4"	DNP	DNP	DNP	DNP	DNP	DNP	DNP	
Jordan Whittington	WR	6'1"	205 lbs	30 3/8"	10"	DNP	18 Reps	DNP	DNP	DNP	DNP	DNP	
Keilan Robinson	RB	5'8"	191 lbs	30 5/8"	9 5/8"	4.42	DNP	33"	10' 5"	DNP	DNP	1.51	
Ryan Watts	CB	6'3"	208 lbs	34 1/2"	9 3/8"	4.53	DNP	40.5"	10'5"	6.82	4.13	1.55	
T'Vondre Sweat	DL	6'4 1/2"	366 lbs	33 1/4"	10 1/8"	5.27	DNP	26"	8'2"	DNP	DNP	1.80	
Xavier Worthy	WR	5'11"	165 lbs	31 1/8"	8 3/4"	4.21†	DNP	41"	10' 11"	DNP	DNP	1.49	

† Top performer

DNP = Did not participate

=== Returning starters ===
The Longhorns return 14 starters from the previous season. They return 5 on offense, 6 on defense, and 3 on special teams.

Offense
Player	Class	Position
Quinn Ewers	Junior	QB
Jake Majors	Senior	OL
Hayden Conner	Senior	OL
Kelvin Banks	Junior	OL
DJ Campbell	Junior	OL

Defense
Player	Class	Position
Barryn Sorrell	Senior	EDGE
Ethan Burke	Junior	EDGE
David Gbenda	Senior	LB
Jahdae Barron	Senior	DB
Malik Muhammad	Sophomore	DB
Michael Taaffe	Junior	DB

Special Teams
Player	Class	Position
Bert Auburn	Senior	K
Will Stone	Sophomore	K
Lance St. Louis	Sophomore	DS

== Preseason ==
Predicted finish	Team	Votes (1st place)
1	Georgia	3330 (165)
2	Texas	3041 (27)
3	Alabama	2891 (12)
4	Ole Miss	2783 (4)
5	LSU	2322 (2)
6	Missouri	2240
7	Tennessee	2168
8	Oklahoma	2022
9	Texas A&M	1684
10	Auburn	1382
11	Kentucky	1371
12	Florida	1146
13	South Carolina	923 (1)
14	Arkansas	749
15	Mississippi State	623
16	Vanderbilt	293 (2)

First-place votes
Rank	Team	Votes
1	Georgia	165
2	Texas	27
3	Alabama	12
4	Ole Miss	4
5	LSU	2
6	Vanderbilt	2
7	South Carolina	1

=== Award watch lists ===
Listed in the order that they were released

Award	Name	Position	Year	Source
Lott Trophy	Jahdae Barron	DB	Senior	
Lott Trophy	Andrew Mukuba	DB	Senior	
Dodd Award	Steve Sarkisian	HC	--	
Maxwell Award	Quinn Ewers	QB	Junior	
Outland Trophy	Kelvin Banks Jr.	OL	Junior	
Bronko Nagurski Trophy	Jahdae Barron	DB	Senior	
Bronko Nagurski Trophy	Anthony Hill Jr.	DB	Sophomore	
Paul Hornung Award	Jaydon Blue	RB	Junior	
Lou Groza Award	Bert Auburn	K	Senior	
Walter Camp Award	Quinn Ewers	QB	Junior	
Doak Walker Award	Jaydon Blue	RB	Junior	
Doak Walker Award	CJ Baxter	RB	Sophomore	
Davey O'Brien Award	Quinn Ewers	QB	Junior	
Rimington Trophy	Jake Majors	OL	Senior	
John Mackey Award	Amari Niblack	TE	Junior	
Chuck Bednarik Award	Jahdae Barron	DB	Senior	
Butkus Award	Anthony Hill Jr.	LB	Sophomore	
Johnny Unitas Golden Arm Award	Quinn Ewers	QB	Junior	
Polynesian Football Player of the Year Award	Jermayne Lole	DL	Senior	
Polynesian Football Player of the Year Award	Tiaoalii Savea	DL	Senior	
Manning Award	Quinn Ewers	QB	Junior	
Lombardi Award	Kelvin Banks Jr.	OL	Junior	
Lombardi Award	Trey Moore	DL	Junior	
Earl Campbell Tyler Rose Award	Quinn Ewers	QB	Junior	
Shaun Alexander Freshman of the Year	Ryan Wingo	WR	Freshman	
Shaun Alexander Freshman of the Year	Colin Simmons	EDGE	Freshman	

=== Preseason SEC awards ===
2024 Preseason All-SEC teams

==== Media ====
First Team
Position	Player	Class
Offense
OL	Kelvin Banks Jr.	JR
Special Teams
K	Bert Auburn	SR

Second Team
Position	Player	Class
Offense
QB	Quinn Ewers	JR
RB	CJ Baxter	SO
WR	Isaiah Bond	JR
Defense
LB	Anthony Hill Jr.	SO
DB	Jahdae Barron	SR
DB	Andrew Mukuba	SR
DB	Malik Muhammad	SO
Special Teams
K	Will Stone	JR

Third Team
Position	Player	Class
Offense
OL	Jake Majors	SR
Defense
EDGE	Trey Moore	JR
Special Teams
AP	Jaydon Blue	JR

==== Coaches ====
First Team
Position	Player	Class
Offense
OL	Kelvin Banks Jr.	JR
Special Teams
K	Bert Auburn	SR

Second Team
Position	Player	Class
Offense
QB	Quinn Ewers	JR
WR	Isaiah Bond	JR
Defense
DB	Jahdae Barron	SR
DB	Andrew Mukuba	SR
Special Teams
K	Will Stone	JR

Third Team
Position	Player	Class
Defense
EDGE	Trey Moore	JR
LB	Anthony Hill Jr.	SO
DB	Malik Muhammad	SO

=== Preseason All-Americans ===
Pre-season All-American Honors
Player	Position	Class	Designation	AP	CBS Sports	ESPN	PFF	SI	SN	WCFF
Kelvin Banks Jr.	Offensive lineman	Junior	1st Team Offense (AP); 1st Team Offense (CBS); 1st Team Offense (ESPN); 1st Team Offense (PFF); 1st Team Offense (SI); 2nd Team Offense (SN); 2nd Team Offense (WCFF)	✓	✓	✓	✓	✓	✓	✓
Quinn Ewers	Quarterback	Junior	2nd Team Offense (SN); 2nd Team Offense (WCFF)						✓	✓
Bert Auburn	Kicker	Senior	2nd Team Special Teams (SN)						✓	

Other All-Americans teams
Player	Position	Class	Selector(s)
Kelvin Banks Jr.	Offensive lineman	Junior	1st Team Offense (Athlon); 1st Team Offense (USAT); 2nd Team Offense (CFN)
Jahdae Barron	Defensive back	Senior	1st Team Defense (CFN); 3rd Team Defense (Athlon)
Quinn Ewers	Quarterback	Junior	4th Team Offense (Athlon)
Isaiah Bond	Wide receiver	Junior	4th Team Offense (Athlon)
Bert Auburn	Placekicker	Senior	4th Team Special Team (Athlon)

== Personnel ==
2024 Texas Longhorns football team roster
Players
Coaches
Offense

Pos.	#	Name	Class
WR	0	DeAndre Moore Jr.	So
WR	2	Matthew Golden	Jr
QB	3	Quinn Ewers	Jr
RB	4	CJ Baxter	So
WR	5	Ryan Wingo	Fr
RB	6	Christian Clark	Fr
WR	7	Isaiah Bond	Jr
TE	8	Amari Niblack	Jr
RB	9	Jerrick Gibson	Fr
WR	11	Silas Bolden	Sr
WR	13	Parker Livingstone	Fr
WR	14	Aaron Butler	Fr
QB	15	Trey Owens	Fr
QB	16	Arch Manning	Fr
QB	18	Joe Tatum	Jr
QB	19	Cole Lourd	Sr
RB/WR	21	Ryan Niblett	Fr
RB	23	Jaydon Blue	Jr
RB	24	Velton Gardner	Sr
RB	26	Quintrevion Wisner	So
RB	27	Colin Page	Jr
RB	29	Reid Watkins	Fr
RB	31	Nik Sanders	Fr
WR	35	Rhett Andersen	So
WR	36	Quinn Merritt	Jr
WR	38	Remy Patson	Jr
WR	39	Hamilton McMartin	Jr
WR	48	Bryce Chambers	So
WR	49	Thatcher Milton	Sr
OL	51	Daniel Cruz	Fr
OL	52	DJ Campbell	Jr
OL	54	Cole Hutson	Jr
OL	56	Cameron Williams	Jr
OL	62	Connor Robertson	So
OL	63	Rick McBroom	Jr
OL	64	Robert Sweeney	So
OL	65	Jake Majors	Sr
OL	67	Malik Agbo	So
OL	68	Brooks Kieschnick Jr.	So
OL	69	Max Merril	Jr
OL	70	Nate Kibble	Fr
OL	72	Neto Umeozulu	So
OL	73	Brandon Baker	Fr
OL	74	Trevor Goosby	Fr
OL	75	Jaydon Chatman	Fr
OL	76	Hayden Conner	Sr
OL	77	Andre Cojoe	Fr
OL	78	Kelvin Banks Jr.	Jr
OL	79	Connor Strohe	Fr
WR	80	Freddie Dubose	Fr
TE	81	Juan Davis	Sr
TE	82	Ridge Barker	Fr
TE	83	Spencer Shannon	Fr
WR	84	Reece Beauchamp	Jr
TE	84	Jordan Washington	Fr
TE	85	Gunnar Helm	Sr
WR	86	Hudson Powell	Fr
TE	87	Will Randle	Fr
WR	89	Ty Boatright	So

Defense

Pos.	#	Name	Class
LB	0	Anthony Hill Jr.	So
DE	1	Justice Finkley	Jr
DB	2	Derek Williams Jr.	So
DB	3	Jaylon Guilbeau	Jr
DB	4	Andrew Mukuba	Sr
DB	5	Malik Muhammad	So
DB	6	Kobe Black	Fr
DB	7	Jahdae Barron	Sr
DE	8	Trey Moore	Jr
DB	9	Gavin Holmes	Sr
DB	11	Colin Simmons	Fr
DB	13	Jay'Vion Cole	Jr
DL	15	Bill Norton	Sr
DB	16	Michael Taaffe	Jr
LB	18	Liona Lefau	So
DE	19	Zina Umeozulu	Fr
DB	21	Xavier Filsaime	Fr
DB	23	Jordon Johnson-Rubell	Fr
DB	24	Warren Roberson	Fr
DB	25	Jelani McDonald	So
LB	26	Ty'Anthony Smith	Fr
DB	27	Wardell Mack	Fr
DB	28	Santana Wilson	Fr
DB	29	Carson Marshall	Jr
DB	30	Jackson Duffey	Fr
LB	32	Brady Sarkisian	So
LB	33	David Gbenda	Sr
DB	35	McCoy Bruce	Fr
LB	37	Morice Blackwell Jr.	Sr
DB	38	Graham Gillespie	Jr
LB	40	Derion Gullette	Fr
DB	41	Ziky Umeozulu	Fr
LB	43	Eric Garza	Fr
DL	45	Vernon Broughton	Sr
DE	46	Tausili Akana	Fr
LB	50	Michael Flanagan	Jr
LB	51	Marshall Landwehr	Sr
DL	53	Aaron Bryant	So
DL	55	Melvin Hills III	Fr
DL	86	Dorian Black	Sr
DE	88	Barryn Sorrell	Sr
DL	90	Sydir Mitchell	Fr
DE	91	Ethan Burke	Jr
DE	92	Colton Vasek	Fr
DL	94	Jaray Bledsoe	So
DL	95	Alfred Collins	Sr
DL	97	Alex January	Fr
DL	98	Tiaoalii Savea	Sr
DL	99	Jermayne Lole	Sr

Special teams

Pos.	#	Name	Class
K	15	Will Stone	Jr
K/P	39	Michael Kern	Fr
LS	42	Tate Haver	So
K	45	Bert Auburn	Sr
K	46	Spencer Barnett	Fr
K	47	Charlie Feris	Jr
P	49	Ian Ratliff	So
LS	57	Christian Rizzi	Sr
LS	58	Lance St. Louis	Jr

Head coach

- Steve Sarkisian

Coordinators/assistant coaches

- Jeff Banks – Associate head coach/special teams coordinator/tight ends
- Kyle Flood –Offensive coordinator/offensive linemen
- Pete Kwiatkowski – Defensive coordinator/outside linebackers
- A. J. Milwee – Co-offensive coordinator/quarterbacks
- Johnny Nansen – Co-defensive coordinator/inside linebackers
- Tashard Choice – Running backs
- Chris Jackson – Wide receivers
- Kenny Baker – Defensive linemen
- Terry Joseph – Defensive backs
- Blake Gideon – Safeties
- Scottie Hazelton – Special assistant to the head coach
- Michael Bimonte – Offensive analyst
- Patrick Crowley – Offensive analyst
- John Dozier Dean – Offensive analyst
- William Gay – Offensive analyst
- Derron Gatewood – Analyst
- Keynodo Hutson – Analyst
- Davis Koetter – Analyst
- Dalton Williams – Analyst
- Tevis Bartlett – Graduate assistant
- Mitch Zoloty – Graduate assistant

Legend

- (C) Team captain
- (S) Suspended
- (I) Ineligible
- Injured
- Redshirt

Roster
Last update: 12/4/24

== Schedule ==
The 2024 season's out-of-conference opponents represent the AAC, Big Ten, Mountain West and the Sun Belt. The Longhorns will host three of their four non-conference games which are against Colorado State from the Mountain West, Louisiana–Monroe from the Sun Belt, and UTSA from the AAC. The Longhorns will travel to Michigan. Texas' season opener against Colorado State – the second meeting between the two teams – was agreed upon in 2019, with Colorado State to receive a $1.8 million payout as part of the contract for the matchup. The game at Michigan is part of a home-and-home series initially announced in 2014, though in 2023 the programs agreed to switch the order of locations such that the match would be played at Michigan Stadium in 2024 and Darrell K Royal–Texas Memorial Stadium in 2027. In 2019, Texas scheduled home-only games against UTSA and UTEP for 2024–2031, to be played in alternating years. Texas's final regular season non-conference game for 2024, against Louisiana–Monroe, will be the first of two home games for Texas; their second game is scheduled for 2029. A home-and-home series formerly scheduled with South Florida for 2020 and 2024 was canceled following additions to Texas's 2024 non-conference slate.

Texas' 2024 schedule consists of seven home games and four away games, along with one neutral site game for the regular season. Texas and the SEC announced the conference's 2024 football schedule on December 13, 2023. Texas will host four SEC conference opponents Florida, Georgia, Kentucky and Mississippi State at home and will travel to four SEC opponents, Arkansas (rivalry), Texas A&M (rivalry) and Vanderbilt to close out the SEC regular season on the road. The Longhorns will face Oklahoma in Dallas at the Cotton Bowl. The team will have bye weeks in week 6 and 10 (October 5 and November 2, respectively).

With the Longhorns entering a new conference, many matchups familiar to the Longhorns were not played this year. The Longhorns didn't play Baylor for the first time since 1945, TCU for the first time since 2011. Oklahoma State for the first time since 1995, and Texas Tech for the first time since 1959.

Date	Time	Opponent	Rank	Site	TV	Result	Attendance
August 31	2:30 p.m.	Colorado State*	No. 4	Darrell K Royal–Texas Memorial Stadium; Austin, TX	ESPN	W 52–0	99,171
September 7	11:00 a.m.	at No. 10 Michigan*	No. 3	Michigan Stadium; Ann Arbor, MI (Big Noon Kickoff, College GameDay)	FOX	W 31–12	111,170
September 14	6:00 p.m.	UTSA*	No. 2	Darrell K Royal–Texas Memorial Stadium; Austin, TX	ESPN	W 56–7	101,892
September 21	7:00 p.m.	Louisiana–Monroe*	No. 1	Darrell K Royal–Texas Memorial Stadium; Austin, TX	SECN+/ESPN+	W 51–3	102,850
September 28	3:15 p.m.	Mississippi State	No. 1	Darrell K Royal–Texas Memorial Stadium; Austin, TX	SECN	W 35–13	101,388
October 12	2:30 p.m.	vs. No. 18 Oklahoma	No. 1	Cotton Bowl; Dallas, TX (Red River Rivalry, SEC Nation)	ABC	W 34–3	92,100
October 19	6:30 p.m.	No. 5 Georgia	No. 1	Darrell K Royal–Texas Memorial Stadium; Austin, TX (College GameDay)	ABC	L 15–30	105,215 (Note: 105,215 sets new all-time attendance record at Darrell K Royal–Texas Memorial Stadium, breaking the previous record of 105,213 set on September 10, 2022 vs Alabama.)
October 26	3:15 p.m.	at No. 25 Vanderbilt	No. 5	FirstBank Stadium; Nashville, TN	SECN	W 27–24	28,934
November 9	11:00 a.m.	Florida	No. 5	Darrell K Royal–Texas Memorial Stadium; Austin, TX	ABC	W 49–17	103,375
November 16	11:00 a.m.	at Arkansas	No. 3	Donald W. Reynolds Razorback Stadium; Fayetteville, AR (rivalry)	ABC	W 20–10	74,929
November 23	2:30 p.m.	Kentucky	No. 3	Darrell K Royal–Texas Memorial Stadium; Austin, TX	ABC	W 31–14	102,811
November 30	6:30 p.m.	at No. 20 Texas A&M	No. 3	Kyle Field; College Station, TX (Lone Star Showdown, College GameDay)	ABC	W 17–7	109,028
December 7	3:00 p.m.	vs. No. 5 Georgia*	No. 2	Mercedes-Benz Stadium; Atlanta, GA (SEC Championship, College GameDay, SEC Nation)	ABC	L 19–22 ^{OT}	74,916
December 21	3:00 p.m.	(12) No. 16 Clemson*	(5) No. 3	Darrell K Royal–Texas Memorial Stadium; Austin, TX (CFP First Round, SEC Nation)	TNT	W 38–24	101,150
January 1, 2025	12:00 p.m.	vs. (4) No. 12 Arizona State*	(5) No. 3	Mercedes-Benz Stadium; Atlanta, GA (Peach Bowl–CFP Quarterfinals)	ESPN	W 39–31 ^{2OT}	71,105
January 10, 2025	6:30 p.m.	vs. (8) No. 6 Ohio State*	(5) No. 3	AT&T Stadium; Arlington, TX (Cotton Bowl Classic–CFP Semifinals)	ESPN	L 14–28	74,527
*Non-conference game; Rankings from AP Poll (and CFP Rankings, after November 5) - Released prior to game; All times are in Central time

== Game summaries ==
=== Colorado State ===
Team	1	2	3	4	Total
Colorado State	0	0	0	0	0
• No. 4 Texas	7	24	14	7	52

- Date: August 31
- Location: Darrell K Royal–Texas Memorial Stadium (Austin, TX)
- Game start: 2:30 p.m.
- Game attendance: 99,171
- Game weather: Sunny
- Referee: David Smith
- TV announcers (ESPN): Mike Monaco (play-by-play), Kirk Morrison (analyst), and Dawn Davenport (sideline)

Statistics	CSU	TEX
First downs	11	26
Total yards	192	545
Rushing yards	118	190
Passing yards	74	355
Turnovers	2	1
Time of possession	29:17	30:43

Team	Category	Player	Statistics
Colorado State	Passing	Brayden Fowler-Nicolosi	10-18, 59 yards, 1 INT
Colorado State	Rushing	Justin Marshall	25 carries, 106 yards
Colorado State	Receiving	Tory Horton	5 receptions, 31 yards
Texas	Passing	Quinn Ewers	20-27, 260 yards, 3 TD, 1 INT
Texas	Rushing	Jerrick Gibson	10 carries, 67 yards, 1 TD
Texas	Receiving	Ryan Wingo	4 receptions, 70 yards

Scoring summary

Quarter	Time	Drive			Team	Scoring information	Score	
Quarter	Time	Plays	Yards	TOP	Team	Scoring information	Colorado State	Texas
1st	09:36	4	64	01:43	Texas	Quintrevion Wisner 3-yard touchdown run, Bert Auburn kick good	0	7
2nd	10:56	4	4	01:45	Texas	45-yard field goal by Bert Auburn	0	10
2nd	05:50	7	70	02:50	Texas	Matthew Golden 1-yard touchdown reception from Quinn Ewers, Bert Auburn kick good	0	17
2nd	01:55	5	43	01:37	Texas	Isaiah Bond 7-yard touchdown reception from Quinn Ewers, Bert Auburn kick good	0	24
2nd	00:12	5	33	00:46	Texas	Matthew Golden 11-yard touchdown reception from Quinn Ewers, Bert Auburn kick good	0	31
3rd	06:47	8	80	03:35	Texas	Jerrick Gibson 5-yard touchdown run, Bert Auburn kick good	0	38
3rd	02:23	4	49	01:41	Texas	Silas Bolden 5-yard touchdown reception from Arch Manning, Bert Auburn kick good	0	45
4th	10:10	11	55	04:41	Texas	Arch Manning 1-yard touchdown run, Bert Auburn kick good	0	52
"TOP" = time of possession. For other American football terms, see Glossary of American football.							0	52

=== at No. 10 Michigan ===
Team	1	2	3	4	Total
• No. 3 Texas	7	17	7	0	31
No. 10 Michigan	0	3	3	6	12

- Date: September 7
- Location: Michigan Stadium (Ann Arbor, MI)
- Game start: 11:00 a.m.
- Game attendance: 111,170
- Game weather: Sunny
- Referee: Ron Snodgrass
- TV announcers (FOX): Gus Johnson (play-by-play), Joel Klatt (analyst), and Jenny Taft (sideline)

Statistics	TEX	MICH
First downs	19	13
Total yards	389	284
Rushing yards	143	80
Passing yards	246	204
Turnovers	0	3
Time of possession	31:20	28:40

Team	Category	Player	Statistics
Texas	Passing	Quinn Ewers	24-36, 246 yards, 3 TD
Texas	Rushing	Ryan Wingo	1 carries, 55 yards
Texas	Receiving	Gunnar Helm	7 receptions, 98 yards, 1 TD
Michigan	Passing	Davis Warren	22-33, 204 yards, 1 TD, 2 INT
Michigan	Rushing	Donovan Edwards	8 carries, 41 yards
Michigan	Receiving	Colston Loveland	8 receptions, 70 yards

Scoring summary

Quarter	Time	Drive			Team	Scoring information	Score	
Quarter	Time	Plays	Yards	TOP	Team	Scoring information	Texas	Michigan
1st	04:14	6	56	03:06	Texas	Gunnar Helm 21-yard touchdown reception from Quinn Ewers, Bert Auburn kick good	7	0
2nd	13:23	9	55	05:45	Michigan	37-yard field goal by Dominic Zvada	7	3
2nd	08:24	12	76	04:53	Texas	Jerrick Gibson 7-yard touchdown run, Bert Auburn kick good	14	3
2nd	02:40	10	29	04:10	Texas	26-yard field goal by Bert Auburn	17	3
2nd	00:10	6	42	00:49	Texas	Matthew Golden 5-yard touchdown reception from Quinn Ewers, Bert Auburn kick good	24	3
3rd	05:28	9	41	04:22	Michigan	52-yard field goal by Dominic Zvada	24	6
3rd	02:39	6	75	02:49	Texas	Jaydon Blue 7-yard touchdown reception from Quinn Ewers, Bert Auburn kick good	31	6
4th	01:54	8	78	02:55	Michigan	Semaj Morgan 31-yard touchdown reception from Davis Warren, 2-point pass incomplete	31	12
"TOP" = time of possession. For other American football terms, see Glossary of American football.							31	12

=== UTSA ===
Attendance of 101,892 was, at the time, the 9th largest attendance at Darrell K Royal–Texas Memorial Stadium.

Team	1	2	3	4	Total
UTSA	0	7	0	0	7
• No. 2 Texas	14	14	14	14	56

- Date: September 14
- Location: Darrell K Royal–Texas Memorial Stadium (Austin, TX)
- Game start: 6:00 p.m.
- Game attendance: 101,892
- Game weather: Cloudy, 95 °F (35 °C)
- Referee: Wayne Winkler
- TV announcers (ESPN): Mark Jones (play-by-play), Roddy Jones (analyst), and Quint Kessenich (sideline)

Statistics	UTSA	TEX
First downs	14	24
Total yards	260	614
Rushing yards	128	187
Passing yards	132	427
Turnovers	1	2
Time of possession	31:01	28:59

Team	Category	Player	Statistics
UTSA	Passing	Owen McCown	21-29, 132 yards
UTSA	Rushing	Robert Henry	6 carries, 65 yards, 1 TD
UTSA	Receiving	Devin McCuin	5 receptions, 27 yards
Texas	Passing	Arch Manning	9-12, 223 yards, 4 TD
Texas	Rushing	Jerrick Gibson	13 carries, 75 yards
Texas	Receiving	Ryan Wingo	3 receptions, 127 yards, 1 TD

Scoring summary

Quarter	Time	Drive			Team	Scoring information	Score	
Quarter	Time	Plays	Yards	TOP	Team	Scoring information	UTSA	Texas
1st	09:27	8	84	03:52	Texas	Isiah Bond 7-yard touchdown reception from Quinn Ewers, Bert Auburn kick good	0	7
1st	00:06	12	69	06:07	Texas	Johntay Cook 19-yard touchdown reception from Quinn Ewers, Bert Auburn kick good	0	14
2nd	12:10	4	72	01:20	Texas	DeAndre Moore 19-yard touchdown reception from Arch Manning, Bert Auburn kick good	0	21
2nd	11:39	2	75	00:31	UTSA	Robert Henry 53-yard touchdown run, Chase Allen kick good	7	21
2nd	11:07	2	75	00:32	Texas	Arch Manning 67-yard touchdown run, Bert Auburn kick good	7	28
3rd	13:13	5	75	01:47	Texas	Isaiah Bond 51-yard touchdown reception from Arch Manning, Bert Auburn kick good	7	35
3rd	10:57	1	75	00:11	Texas	Ryan Wingo 75-yard touchdown reception from Arch Manning, Bert Auburn kick good	7	42
4th	13:19	5	66	02:01	Texas	Johntay Cook 12-yard touchdown reception from Arch Manning, Bert Auburn kick good	7	49
4th	01:50				Texas	Interception returned 30 yards for touchdown by Ethan Burke, Bert Auburn kick good	7	56
"TOP" = time of possession. For other American football terms, see Glossary of American football.							7	56

=== Louisiana–Monroe ===
Attendance of 102,850 was, at the time, the fifth largest attendance at Darrell K Royal–Texas Memorial Stadium.

Team	1	2	3	4	Total
ULM	0	3	0	0	3
• No. 1 Texas	21	7	9	14	51

- Date: September 21
- Location: Darrell K Royal–Texas Memorial Stadium (Austin, TX)
- Game start: 7:00 p.m.
- Game attendance: 102,850
- Game weather: Sunny • Temperature: 95 °F (35 °C)
- Referee: Kyle Olson
- TV announcers (SECN+/ESPN+): Lowell Galindo (play-by-play, Fozzy Whittaker (analyst), and Alex Chappell (sideline)

Statistics	ULM	TEX
First downs	7	26
Total yards	111	497
Rushing yards	57	239
Passing yards	54	258
Turnovers	2	2
Time of possession	26:27	33:33

Team	Category	Player	Statistics
Louisiana–Monroe	Passing	General Booty	8-19, 42 yards, 1 INT
Louisiana–Monroe	Rushing	Taven Curry	6 carries, 30 yards
Louisiana–Monroe	Receiving	Julian Nixon	1 reception, 23 yards
Texas	Passing	Arch Manning	15-29, 258 yards, 2 TD, 2 INT
Texas	Rushing	Jaydon Blue	25 carries, 124 yards, 3 TD
Texas	Receiving	Isaiah Bond	2 receptions, 75 yards

Scoring summary

Quarter	Time	Drive			Team	Scoring information	Score	
Quarter	Time	Plays	Yards	TOP	Team	Scoring information	ULM	Texas
1st	07:11	7	77	02:49	Texas	Jaydon Blue 1-yard touchdown run, Bert Auburn kick good	0	7
1st	05:28	4	13	00:58	Texas	Jaydon Blue 3-yard touchdown reception from Arch Manning, Bert Auburn kick good	0	14
1st	01:34	6	73	02:06	Texas	Ryan Wingo 17-yard touchdown reception from Arch Manning, Bert Auburn kick good	0	21
2nd	08:15	12	87	05:11	Texas	Jaydon Blue 2-yard touchdown run, Bert Auburn kick good	0	28
2nd	01:46	13	58	06:29	ULM	35-yard field goal by Max Larson	3	28
3rd	11:04	6	66	02:20	Texas	Jerrick Gibson 2-yard touchdown run, Bert Auburn kick good	3	35
3rd	03:24	1	0		Texas	Ozarrio Smith tackled in end zone for a safety by Liona Lefau	3	37
4th	14:56	9	63	03:21	Texas	Jaydon Blue 1-yard touchdown run, Bert Auburn kick good	3	44
4th	08:18	10	57	04:35	Texas	Ryan Niblett 1-yard touchdown run, Bert Auburn kick good	3	51
"TOP" = time of possession. For other American football terms, see Glossary of American football.							3	51

=== Mississippi State ===
Attendance of 101,388 was, at the time, the 17th largest attendance at Darrell K Royal–Texas Memorial Stadium.

Team	1	2	3	4	Total
Mississippi State	0	6	0	7	13
• No. 1 Texas	7	7	7	14	35

- Date: September 28
- Location: Darrell K Royal–Texas Memorial Stadium (Austin, TX)
- Game start: 3:15 p.m.
- Game attendance: 101,388
- Game weather: Sunny • Temperature: 93 °F (34 °C)
- Referee: Ken Williamson
- TV announcers (SECN): Tom Hart (play-by-play), Cole Cubelic (analyst), and Alyssa Lang (sideline)

Statistics	MSST	TEX
First downs	19	21
Total yards	294	522
Rushing yards	150	198
Passing yards	144	324
Turnovers	1	2
Time of possession	34:57	25:03

Team	Category	Player	Statistics
Mississippi State	Passing	Michael Van Buren Jr.	12-23, 144 yards
Mississippi State	Rushing	Johnnie Daniels	15 carries, 75 yards
Mississippi State	Receiving	Kevin Coleman Jr.	6 receptions, 57 yards
Texas	Passing	Arch Manning	26-31, 324 yards, 2 TD
Texas	Rushing	Quintrevion Wisner	13 carries, 88 yards
Texas	Receiving	DeAndre Moore Jr.	4 receptions, 103 yards, 2 TD

Scoring summary

Quarter	Time	Drive			Team	Scoring information	Score	
Quarter	Time	Plays	Yards	TOP	Team	Scoring information	Miss St.	Texas
1st	06:06	5	72	01:46	Texas	Jaydon Blue 1-yard touchdown run, Bert Auburn kick good	0	7
2nd	09:24	7	10	03:11	Miss St.	45-yard field goal by Kyle Ferrie	3	7
2nd	01:56	10	64	05:34	Miss St.	32-yard field goal by Kyle Ferrie	6	7
2nd	00:29	8	76	01:27	Texas	DeAndre Moore Jr. 50-yard touchdown reception from Arch Manning, Bert Auburn kick good	6	14
3rd	00:00	10	75	05:22	Texas	Arch Manning 1-yard touchdown run, Bert Auburn kick good	6	21
4th	09:30	8	85	03:08	Texas	DeAndre Moore Jr. 27-yard touchdown reception from Arch Manning, Bert Auburn kick good	6	28
4th	06:12	7	75	03:18	Miss St.	Michael Van Buren Jr. 12-yard touchdown run, Kyle Ferrie kick good	13	28
4th	03:03	8	72	03:09	Texas	Isaiah Bond 26-yard touchdown run, Bert Auburn kick good	13	35
"TOP" = time of possession. For other American football terms, see Glossary of American football.							13	35

=== vs. No. 18т Oklahoma ===
Red River Showdown

Team	1	2	3	4	Total
• No. 1 Texas	0	21	3	10	34
No. 18т Oklahoma	3	0	0	0	3

- Date: October 12
- Location: Cotton Bowl (Dallas, TX)
- Game start: 2:30 p.m.
- Game attendance: 92,100
- Game weather: Sunny • Temperature: 92 °F (33 °C)
- Referee: Steve Marlowe
- TV announcers (ABC): Chris Fowler (play-by-play), Kirk Herbstreit (analyst), and Holly Rowe (sideline)

Statistics	TEX	OU
First downs	17	18
Total yards	406	237
Rushing yards	177	89
Passing yards	229	148
Turnovers	1	2
Time of possession	27:53	32:07

Team	Category	Player	Statistics
Texas	Passing	Quinn Ewers	20-29, 199 yards, 1 TD, 1 INT
Texas	Rushing	Quintrevion Wisner	13 carries, 118 yards, 1 TD
Texas	Receiving	Gunnar Helm	5 receptions, 91 yards, 1 TD
Oklahoma	Passing	Michael Hawkins Jr.	19-30, 148 yards
Oklahoma	Rushing	Jovantae Barnes	14 carries, 38 yards
Oklahoma	Receiving	Zion Kearney	4 receptions, 45 yards

Scoring summary

Quarter	Time	Drive			Team	Scoring information	Score	
Quarter	Time	Plays	Yards	TOP	Team	Scoring information	Texas	OU
1st	00:10	11	38	04:42	OU	42-yard field goal by Tyler Keltner	0	3
2nd	11:20	10	75	03:50	Texas	Gunnar Helm 7-yard touchdown reception from Quinn Ewers, Bert Auburn kick good	7	3
2nd	02:21	4	84	01:58	Texas	Silas Bolden 0-yard touchdown run, Bert Auburn kick good	14	3
2nd	01:40	1	43	00:11	Texas	Quintrevion Wisner 43-yard touchdown run, Bert Auburn kick good	21	3
3rd	01:01	11	45	05:35	Texas	41-yard field goal by Bert Auburn	24	3
4th	07:44	7	13	03:36	Texas	29-yard field goal by Bert Auburn	27	3
4th	05:21	3	32	01:06	Texas	Quinn Ewers 1-yard touchdown run, Bert Auburn kick good	34	3
"TOP" = time of possession. For other American football terms, see Glossary of American football.							34	3

=== No. 5 Georgia ===
Team	1	2	3	4	Total
• No. 5 Georgia	7	16	0	7	30
No. 1 Texas	0	0	15	0	15

- Date: October 19
- Location: Darrell K Royal–Texas Memorial Stadium (Austin, TX)
- Game weather: Sunny
- Referee: Matt Loeffler
- TV announcers (ABC): Chris Fowler (play-by-play), Kirk Herbstreit (analyst), Holly Rowe, and Katie George (sidelines)

Statistics	UGA	TEX
First downs	14	19
Total yards	283	259
Rushing yards	108	29
Passing yards	175	230
Turnovers	3	4
Time of possession	30:26	29:34

Team	Category	Player	Statistics
Georgia	Passing	Carson Beck	23-41, 175 yards, 3 INT
Georgia	Rushing	Trevor Etienne	19 carries, 87 yards, 3 TD
Georgia	Receiving	Oscar Delp	2 receptions, 45 yards
Texas	Passing	Quinn Ewers	25-43, 211 yards, 2 TD, 1 INT
Texas	Rushing	Quintrevion Wisner	15 carries, 52 yards
Texas	Receiving	Matthew Golden	3 receptions, 77 yards

Scoring summary

Quarter	Time	Drive			Team	Scoring information	Score	
Quarter	Time	Plays	Yards	TOP	Team	Scoring information	Georgia	Texas
1st	00:06	4	13	01:35	Georgia	Trevor Etienne 2-yard touchdown run, Peyton Woodring kick good	7	0
2nd	10:46	7	13	02:43	Georgia	33-yard field goal by Peyton Woodring	10	0
2nd	08:30	3	34	01:29	Georgia	Trevor Etienne 15-yard touchdown run, Peyton Woodring kick good	17	0
2nd	04:43	7	25	01:51	Georgia	48-yard field goal by Peyton Woodring	20	0
2nd	00:00	4	4	00:25	Georgia	44-yard field goal by Peyton Woodring	23	0
3rd	10:57	8	55	03:52	Texas	Isaiah Bond 2-yard touchdown reception from Quinn Ewers, 2-point pass to Isaiah Bond good	23	8
3rd	02:12	2	9	00:48	Texas	Jaydon Blue 17-yard touchdown reception from Quinn Ewers, Bert Auburn kick good	23	15
4th	12:04	11	89	05:03	Georgia	Trevor Etienne 1-yard touchdown run, Peyton Woodring kick good	30	15
"TOP" = time of possession. For other American football terms, see Glossary of American football.							30	15

=== at No. 25 Vanderbilt ===
Team	1	2	3	4	Total
• No. 5 Texas	14	7	3	3	27
No. 25 Vanderbilt	7	3	7	7	24

- Date: October 26
- Location: FirstBank Stadium (Nashville, TN)
- Game start: 3:15 p.m.
- Game attendance: 28,934
- Game weather: Sunny
- Referee: Daniel Gautreaux
- TV announcers (SECN): Tom Hart (play-by-play), Cole Cubelic (analyst), and Alyssa Lang (sideline)

Statistics	TEX	VAN
First downs	20	17
Total yards	392	269
Rushing yards	104	114
Passing yards	288	155
Turnovers	2	3
Time of possession	31:09	28:51

Team	Category	Player	Statistics
Texas	Passing	Quinn Ewers	27-37, 288 yards, 3 TD, 2 INT
Texas	Rushing	Quintrevion Wisner	17 carries, 79 yards
Texas	Receiving	DeAndre Moore Jr.	6 receptions, 97 yards, 2 TD
Vanderbilt	Passing	Diego Pavia	16-29, 143 yards, 2 TD, 2 INT
Vanderbilt	Rushing	Diego Pavia	16 carries, 67 yards, 1 TD
Vanderbilt	Receiving	Junior Sherrill	5 receptions, 62 yards, 1 TD

Scoring summary

Quarter	Time	Drive			Team	Scoring information	Score	
Quarter	Time	Plays	Yards	TOP	Team	Scoring information	Texas	Vanderbilt
1st	09:40	5	31	02:54	Vanderbilt	Diego Pavia 18-yard touchdown run, Brock Taylor kick good	0	7
1st	05:37	9	75	04:03	Texas	Matthew Golden 3-yard touchdown reception from Quinn Ewers, Bert Auburn kick good	7	7
1st	01:13	4	49	01:38	Texas	DeAndre Moore Jr. 27-yard touchdown reception from Quinn Ewers, Bert Auburn kick good	14	7
2nd	05:04	5	59	01:47	Texas	DeAndre Moore Jr. 25-yard touchdown reception from Quinn Ewers, Bert Auburn kick good	21	7
2nd	00:00	5	29	00:34	Vanderbilt	54-yard field goal by Brock Taylor	21	10
3rd	08:54	11	50	04:26	Texas	40-yard field goal by Bert Auburn	24	10
3rd	03:11	8	38	03:16	Vanderbilt	Junior Sherrill 3-yard touchdown reception from Diego Pavia, Brock Taylor kick good	24	17
4th	01:57	7	24	03:08	Texas	23-yard field goal by Bert Auburn	27	17
4th	00:46	8	75	01:11	Vanderbilt	Eli Stowers 8-yard touchdown reception from Diego Pavia, Brock Taylor kick good	27	24
"TOP" = time of possession. For other American football terms, see Glossary of American football.							27	24

=== Florida ===
Team	1	2	3	4	Total
Florida	0	0	10	7	17
• No. 5 Texas	14	21	7	7	49

- Date: November 9
- Location: Darrell K Royal–Texas Memorial Stadium (Austin, TX)
- Game start: 11:00 a.m.
- Game attendance: 103,375
- Game weather: Sunny
- Referee: Lee Hendrick
- TV announcers (ABC): Joe Tessitore (play-by-play), Jesse Palmer (analyst), and Katie George (sideline)

Statistics	UF	TEX
First downs	20	23
Total yards	329	562
Rushing yards	197	210
Passing yards	132	352
Turnovers	3	1
Time of possession	32:06	27:54

Team	Category	Player	Statistics
Florida	Passing	Aidan Warner	12-25, 132 yards, 2 INT
Florida	Rushing	Ja'Kobi Jackson	19 carries, 116 yards
Florida	Receiving	Chimere Dike	5 receptions, 95 yards
Texas	Passing	Quinn Ewers	19-27, 333 yards, 5 TD
Texas	Rushing	Jerrick Gibson	16 carries, 100 yards, 1 TD
Texas	Receiving	Jaydon Blue	3 receptions, 67 yards

Scoring summary

Quarter	Time	Drive			Team	Scoring information	Score	
Quarter	Time	Plays	Yards	TOP	Team	Scoring information	Florida	Texas
1st	03:43	7	85	02:55	Texas	Matthew Golden 29-yard touchdown reception from Quinn Ewers, Bert Auburn kick good	0	7
1st	03:11	2	22	00:09	Texas	Gunnar Helm 22-yard touchdown reception from Quinn Ewers, Bert Auburn kick good	0	14
2nd	05:54	1	50	00:11	Texas	Quintrevion Wisner 50-yard touchdown reception from Quinn Ewers, Bert Auburn kick good	0	21
2nd	01:19	4	80	00:27	Texas	Matthew Golden 32-yard touchdown reception from Quinn Ewers, Bert Auburn kick good	0	28
2nd	00:23	4	45	00:35	Texas	Jaydon Blue 5-yard touchdown run, Bert Auburn kick good	0	35
3rd	12:52	3	31	01:27	Texas	Isaiah Bond 34-yard touchdown reception from Quinn Ewers, Bert Auburn kick good	0	42
3rd	07:03	15	70	05:49	Florida	23-yard field goal by Trey Smack	3	42
3rd	01:30	9	56	04:44	Florida	Jadan Baugh 2-yard touchdown run, Trey Smack kick good	10	42
4th	14:55	4	75	01:35	Texas	Jerrick Gibson 14-yard touchdown run, Bert Auburn kick good	10	49
4th	08:27	7	67	03:13	Florida	Ja'Kobi Jackson 7-yard touchdown run, Trey Smack kick good	17	49
"TOP" = time of possession. For other American football terms, see Glossary of American football.							17	49

=== at Arkansas ===
Arkansas–Texas football rivalry

Team	1	2	3	4	Total
• No. 3 Texas	7	3	3	7	20
Arkansas	0	0	7	3	10

- Date: November 16
- Location: Donald W. Reynolds Razorback Stadium (Fayetteville, AR)
- Game start: 11:00 a.m.
- Game attendance: 74,929
- Game weather: Sunny • Temperature: 61 °F (16 °C) • Wind: S 12 miles per hour (19 km/h)
- Referee: Steve Marlowe
- TV announcers (ABC): Joe Tessitore (play-by-play), Jesse Palmer (analyst), and Katie George (sideline)

Statistics	TEX	ARK
First downs	20	15
Total yards	315	231
Rushing yards	139	82
Passing yards	176	149
Turnovers	0	2
Time of possession	30:59	29:01

Team	Category	Player	Statistics
Texas	Passing	Quinn Ewers	20-32, 176 yards, 2 TD
Texas	Rushing	Jaydon Blue	14 carries, 83 yards
Texas	Receiving	Isaiah Bond	4 receptions, 48 yards
Arkansas	Passing	Taylen Green	17-25, 149 yards, 1 INT
Arkansas	Rushing	Ja'Quinden Jackson	11 carries, 56 yards, 1 TD
Arkansas	Receiving	Andrew Armstrong	6 receptions, 74 yards

Scoring summary

Quarter	Time	Drive			Team	Scoring information	Score	
Quarter	Time	Plays	Yards	TOP	Team	Scoring information	Texas	Arkansas
1st	07:23	6	61	02:17	Texas	Matthew Golden 20-yard touchdown reception from Quinn Ewers, Bert Auburn kick good	7	0
2nd	11:15	11	27	03:45	Texas	39-yard field goal by Bert Auburn	10	0
3rd	08:36	7	36	02:37	Texas	33-yard field goal by Bert Auburn	13	0
3rd	03:39	12	75	04:57	Arkansas	Ja'Quinden Jackson 1-yard touchdown run, Matthew Shipley kick good	13	7
4th	12:48	10	39	04:57	Arkansas	44-yard field goal by Matthew Shipley	13	10
4th	09:05	8	75	03:36	Texas	Matthew Golden 1-yard touchdown reception from Quinn Ewers, Bert Auburn kick good	20	10
"TOP" = time of possession. For other American football terms, see Glossary of American football.							20	10

=== Kentucky ===
Team	1	2	3	4	Total
Kentucky	0	7	7	0	14
• No. 3 Texas	7	17	0	7	31

- Date: November 23
- Location: Darrell K Royal–Texas Memorial Stadium (Austin, TX)
- Game start: 2:30 p.m.
- Game attendance: 102,811
- Game weather: Sunny • Temperature: 77 °F (25 °C)
- Referee: Jeff Heaser
- TV announcers (ABC): Joe Tessitore (play-by-play), Jesse Palmer (analyst), and Katie George (sideline) Sources:

Statistics	UK	TEX
First downs	14	29
Total yards	232	441
Rushing yards	21	250
Passing yards	211	191
Turnovers	2	2
Time of possession	25:30	34:30

Team	Category	Player	Statistics
Kentucky	Passing	Cutter Boley	10-18, 160 yards, 1 INT
Kentucky	Rushing	Jamarion Wilcox	11 carries, 50 yards
Kentucky	Receiving	Willie Rodriguez	3 receptions, 53 yards
Texas	Passing	Quinn Ewers	20-31, 191 yards, 2 TD
Texas	Rushing	Quintrevion Wisner	26 carries, 158 yards, 1 TD
Texas	Receiving	Matthew Golden	7 receptions, 86 yards

Scoring summary

Quarter	Time	Drive			Team	Scoring information	Score	
Quarter	Time	Plays	Yards	TOP	Team	Scoring information	Kentucky	Texas
1st	10:00	11	75	05:00	Texas	Gunnar Helm 3-yard touchdown reception from Quinn Ewers, Bert Auburn kick good	0	7
2nd	11:36	9	73	04:08	Kentucky	Josh Kattus 4-yard touchdown reception from Brock Vandagriff, Alex Raynor kick good	7	7
2nd	06:39	11	65	04:57	Texas	Jaydon Blue 5-yard touchdown run, Bert Auburn kick good	7	14
2nd	03:12	4	34	01:52	Texas	Gunnar Helm 17-yard touchdown reception from Quinn Ewers, Bert Auburn kick good	7	21
2nd	00:10	8	40	01:30	Texas	49-yard field goal by Bert Auburn	7	24
3rd	02:41				Kentucky	Fumble recovery returned 25 yards for touchdown by Jamon Dumas-Johnson, Alex Raynor kick good	14	24
4th	03:10	15	86	08:22	Texas	Quintrevion Wisner 1-yard touchdown run, Bert Auburn kick good	14	31
"TOP" = time of possession. For other American football terms, see Glossary of American football.							14	31

=== at No. 20 Texas A&M ===
Lone Star Showdown

Team	1	2	3	4	Total
• No. 3 Texas	7	10	0	0	17
No. 20 Texas A&M	0	0	7	0	7

- Date: November 30
- Location: Kyle Field (College Station, TX)
- Game start: 6:30 p.m.
- Game attendance: 109,028
- Game weather: Sunny • Temperature: 58 °F (14 °C) • Wind: SE 3 miles per hour (4.8 km/h)
- Referee: David Smith
- TV announcers (ABC): Chris Fowler (play-by-play), Kirk Herbstreit (analyst), and Holly Rowe (sideline)

Statistics	TEX	TAMU
First downs	26	15
Total yards	458	248
Rushing yards	240	102
Passing yards	218	146
Turnovers	2	2
Time of possession	34:44	25:16

Team	Category	Player	Statistics
Texas	Passing	Quinn Ewers	17-28, 218 yards, 1 TD, 1 INT
Texas	Rushing	Quintrevion Wisner	33 carries, 186 yards
Texas	Receiving	Matthew Golden	3 receptions, 73 yards
Texas A&M	Passing	Marcel Reed	16-23, 146 yards, 1 INT
Texas A&M	Rushing	Marcel Reed	14 carries, 60 yards
Texas A&M	Receiving	Terry Bussey	2 receptions, 40 yards

Scoring summary

Quarter	Time	Drive			Team	Scoring information	Score	
Quarter	Time	Plays	Yards	TOP	Team	Scoring information	Texas	Texas A&M
1st	03:07	10	93	04:41	Texas	Arch Manning 15-yard touchdown run, Bert Auburn kick good	7	0
2nd	08:19	8	80	04:24	Texas	Jaydon Blue 7-yard touchdown reception from Quinn Ewers, Bert Auburn kick good	14	0
2nd	01:50	11	70	04:33	Texas	28-yard field goal by Bert Auburn	17	0
3rd	05:42				Texas A&M	Interception returned 93 yards for touchdown by Will Lee III, Randy Bond kick good	17	7
"TOP" = time of possession. For other American football terms, see Glossary of American football.							17	7

=== vs. No. 5 Georgia (SEC Championship) ===
SEC Championship

Team	1	2	3	4	OT	Total
• No. 5 Georgia	0	3	10	3	6	22
No. 2 Texas	3	3	0	10	3	19

- Date: December 7
- Location: Mercedes-Benz Stadium (Atlanta, GA)
- Game start: 3:00 p.m.
- Game attendance: 74,916
- Game weather: Indoor
- Referee: Steve Marlowe
- TV announcers (ABC): Chris Fowler (play-by-play), Kirk Herbstreit (analyst), and Holly Rowe (sideline)

Statistics	UGA	TEX
First downs	19	21
Total yards	277	389
Rushing yards	141	31
Passing yards	136	358
Turnovers	2	3
Time of possession	31:59	28:11

Team	Category	Player	Statistics
Georgia	Passing	Gunner Stockton	12-16, 71 yards, 1 INT
Georgia	Rushing	Trevor Etienne	16 carries, 94 yards, 2 TD
Georgia	Receiving	Arian Smith	5 receptions, 41 yards
Texas	Passing	Quinn Ewers	27-46, 358 yards, 1 TD, 2 INT
Texas	Rushing	Quintrevion Wisner	19 carries, 51 yards
Texas	Receiving	Matthew Golden	8 receptions, 162 yards

Scoring summary

Quarter	Time	Drive			Team	Scoring information	Score	
Quarter	Time	Plays	Yards	TOP	Team	Scoring information	Georgia	Texas
1st	05:17	9	64	04:10	Texas	41-yard field goal by Bert Auburn	0	3
2nd	10:22	14	56	07:14	Texas	42-yard field goal by Bert Auburn	0	6
2nd	06:41	8	49	03:41	Georgia	44-yard field goal by Peyton Woodring	3	6
3rd	10:27	10	75	04:33	Georgia	Trevor Etienne 10-yard touchdown run, Peyton Woodring kick good	10	6
3rd	00:16	9	61	04:40	Georgia	24-yard field goal by Peyton Woodring	13	6
4th	13:54	5	75	01:22	Texas	DeAndre Moore Jr. 41-yard touchdown reception from Quinn Ewers, Bert Auburn kick good	13	13
4th	04:32	16	72	09:22	Georgia	21-yard field goal by Peyton Woodring	16	13
4th	00:18	11	47	02:22	Texas	37-yard field goal by Bert Auburn	16	16
OT	00:00	7	10	00:00	Texas	32-yard field goal by Bert Auburn	16	19
OT	00:00	6	25	00:00	Georgia	Trevor Etienne 4-yard touchdown run, Peyton Woodring kick not attempted	22	19
"TOP" = time of possession. For other American football terms, see Glossary of American football.							22	19

=== No. 16 Clemson (CFP First round) ===
CFP First round

Team	1	2	3	4	Total
No. 16 Clemson	7	3	7	7	24
• No. 3 Texas	7	21	3	7	38

- Date: December 21
- Location: Darrell K Royal–Texas Memorial Stadium (Austin, TX)
- Game start: 3:00 p.m.
- Game attendance: 101,150
- Game weather: Sunny • Temperature: 60 °F (16 °C) • Wind: E
- Referee: Ron Snodgrass
- TV announcers (TNT/Max): Dave Pasch (play-by-play), Dusty Dvoracek (analyst), Taylor McGregor and Laura Rutledge (sideline)

Statistics	CLEM	TEX
First downs	20	26
Total yards	412	494
Rushing yards	76	292
Passing yards	336	202
Turnovers	1	1
Time of possession	27:03	32:57

Team	Category	Player	Statistics
Clemson	Passing	Cade Klubnik	26-43, 336 yards, 3 TD, 1 INT
Clemson	Rushing	Adam Randall	4 carries, 44 yards
Clemson	Receiving	T. J. Moore	9 receptions, 116 yards, 1 TD
Texas	Passing	Quinn Ewers	17-24, 202 yards, 1 TD, 1 INT
Texas	Rushing	Jaydon Blue	14 carries, 146 yards, 2 TD
Texas	Receiving	Gunnar Helm	6 receptions, 77 yards, 1 TD

Scoring summary

Quarter	Time	Drive			Team	Scoring information	Score	
Quarter	Time	Plays	Yards	TOP	Team	Scoring information	Clemson	Texas
1st	08:14	12	75	06:46	Clemson	Antonio Williams 22-yard touchdown reception from Cade Klubnik, Nolan Hauser kick good	7	0
1st	02:04	12	75	06:10	Texas	Quintrevion Wisner 2-yard touchdown run, Bert Auburn kick good	7	7
2nd	12:49	5	65	02:04	Texas	Jaydon Blue 38-yard touchdown run, Bert Auburn kick good	7	14
2nd	07:26	6	82	02:57	Texas	Quintrevion Wisner 16-yard touchdown run, Bert Auburn kick good	7	21
2nd	01:33	7	40	01:07	Clemson	32-yard field goal by Nolan Hauser	10	21
2nd	00:28	7	65	01:05	Texas	Gunnar Helm 19-yard touchdown reception from Quinn Ewers, Bert Auburn kick good	10	28
3rd	08:10	14	71	06:50	Texas	22-yard field goal by Bert Auburn	10	31
3rd	03:29	4	55	01:05	Clemson	Jarvis Green 25-yard touchdown reception from Cade Klubnik, Nolan Hauser kick good	17	31
4th	11:43	10	64	04:12	Clemson	T.J. Moore 7-yard touchdown reception from Cade Klubnik, Nolan Hauser kick good	24	31
4th	10:48	2	83	00:51	Texas	Jaydon Blue 77-yard touchdown run, Bert Auburn kick good	24	38
"TOP" = time of possession. For other American football terms, see Glossary of American football.							24	38

=== vs. No. 12 Arizona State (Peach Bowl-CFP Quarterfinal) ===
Peach Bowl-CFP Quarterfinal

Team	1	2	3	4	OT	2OT	Total
• No. 3 Texas	14	3	0	7	7	8	39
No. 12 Arizona State	3	0	5	16	7	0	31

- Date: January 1
- Location: Mercedes-Benz Stadium (Atlanta, GA)
- Game start: 12:00 p.m.
- Game attendance: 71,105
- Game weather: Indoor
- Referee: Larry Smith
- TV announcers (ESPN): Joe Tessitore (play-by-play), Jesse Palmer (analyst), Katie George and Taylor McGregor (sideline)

Statistics	TEX	ASU
First downs	17	29
Total yards	375	510
Rushing yards	53	214
Passing yards	322	296
Turnovers	1	1
Time of possession	22:06	37:54

Team	Category	Player	Statistics
Texas	Passing	Quinn Ewers	20-30, 322 yards, 3 TD, 1 INT
Texas	Rushing	Quintrevion Wisner	18 carries, 45 yards
Texas	Receiving	Matthew Golden	7 receptions, 149 yards, 1 TD
Arizona State	Passing	Sam Leavitt	24-46, 222 yards, 1 INT
Arizona State	Rushing	Cam Skattebo	30 carries, 143 yards, 2 TD
Arizona State	Receiving	Cam Skattebo	8 receptions, 99 yards

Scoring summary

Quarter	Time	Drive			Team	Scoring information	Score	
Quarter	Time	Plays	Yards	TOP	Team	Scoring information	Texas	Arizona State
1st	08:59	11	53	06:01	Arizona State	39-yard field goal by Carston Kieffer	0	3
1st	08:14	2	77	00:41	Texas	DeAndre Moore Jr. 23-yard touchdown reception from Quinn Ewers, Bert Auburn kick good	7	3
1st	07:08	1	75	00:00	Texas	Punt returned 75 yards for touchdown by Silas Bolden, Bert Auburn kick good	14	3
2nd	08:54	13	72	06:02	Texas	22-yard field goal by Bert Auburn	17	3
3rd	07:38	1	0	00:00	Arizona State	Quinn Ewers tackled in end zone for a safety by Shamari Simmons	17	5
3rd	00:41	11	50	06:51	Arizona State	36-yard field goal by Carston Kieffer	17	8
4th	10:17	13	76	05:23	Texas	Quinn Ewers 5-yard touchdown run, Bert Auburn kick good	24	8
4th	06:31	10	75	03:46	Arizona State	Malik McClain 42-yard touchdown reception from Cam Skattebo, 2-point pass good	24	16
4th	05:00	3	79	00:37	Arizona State	Cam Skattebo 2-yard touchdown run, 2-point run by Cam Skattebo good	24	24
OT	00:00	8	25	00:00	Arizona State	Cam Skattebo 3-yard touchdown run, Carston Kieffer kick good	24	31
OT	00:00	4	25	00:00	Texas	Matthew Golden 28-yard touchdown reception from Quinn Ewers, Bert Auburn kick good	31	31
OT	00:00	1	25	00:00	Texas	Gunnar Helm 25-yard touchdown reception from Quinn Ewers, 2-point pass to Matthew Golden good	39	31
"TOP" = time of possession. For other American football terms, see Glossary of American football.							39	31

=== vs. No. 6 Ohio State (Cotton Bowl-CFP Semifinal) ===
Cotton Bowl-CFP Semifinal

Team	1	2	3	4	Total
• No. 6 Ohio State	7	7	0	14	28
No. 3 Texas	0	7	7	0	14

- Date: January 10
- Location: AT&T Stadium (Arlington, TX)
- Game start: 6:30 p.m.
- Game attendance: 74,527
- Game weather: Indoor
- Referee: Jerry Magallanes
- TV announcers (ESPN): Chris Fowler (play-by-play), Kirk Herbstreit (analyst), and Holly Rowe (sideline)

Statistics	OSU	TEX
First downs	18	20
Total yards	370	341
Rushing yards	81	58
Passing yards	289	283
Turnovers	1	2
Time of possession	31:38	28:22

Team	Category	Player	Statistics
Ohio State	Passing	Will Howard	24/33, 289 yards, 1 TD, 1 INT
Ohio State	Rushing	TreVeyon Henderson	6 carries, 42 yards
Ohio State	Receiving	Carnell Tate	7 receptions, 87 yards
Texas	Passing	Quinn Ewers	23-39, 283 yards, 2 TD, 1 INT
Texas	Rushing	Quintrevion Wisner	17 carries, 46 yards
Texas	Receiving	Jaydon Blue	5 receptions, 59 yards, 2 TD

== Awards and honors ==
=== SEC honors ===
SEC Honors
Honors	Player	Position	Date Awarded	Ref.
Jacobs Blocking Trophy	Kelvin Banks Jr.	OL	December 11, 2024	

All-SEC Team
Player	Position	Team
Kelvin Banks Jr.	OL	1st team
Jahdae Barron	DB	1st team
Quinn Ewers	QB	2nd team
Gunnar Helm	TE	2nd team
Anthony Hill Jr.	LB	2nd team
Quintrevion Wisner	RB	3rd team
Andrew Mukuba	DB	3rd team
HM = Honorable mention. Source:

SEC All-Freshman Team
Player	Position
Colin Simmons	EDGE
HM = Honorable mention. Source:

Weekly SEC Honors
Honors	Player	Position	Date Awarded	Ref.
SEC Co-Offensive Lineman of the Week	Cameron Williams	OL	September 2, 2024	
SEC Co-Offensive Lineman of the Week	Jake Majors	OL	September 9, 2024	
SEC Offensive Player of the Week	Quinn Ewers	QB	September 9, 2024	
SEC Co-Freshman of the Week	Arch Manning	QB	September 16, 2024	
SEC Offensive Lineman of the Week	Kelvin Banks Jr.	OL	September 30, 2024	
SEC Offensive Lineman of the Week	Kelvin Banks Jr.	OL	October 14, 2024	
SEC Co-Defensive Player of the Week	Anthony Hill Jr.	LB	October 14, 2024	
SEC Co-Defensive Player of the Week	Michael Taaffe	DB	October 28, 2024	
SEC Co-Defensive Player of the Week	Jahdae Barron	DB	November 18, 2024	
SEC Defensive Lineman of the Week	Alfred Collins	DL	November 18, 2024	
SEC Co-Offensive Lineman of the Week	Hayden Conner	OL	November 18, 2024	
SEC Co-Defensive Player of the Week	Anthony Hill Jr.	LB	November 25, 2024	
SEC Co-Defensive Player of the Week	Vernon Broughton	DL	December 2, 2024	
SEC Co-Offensive Player of the Week	Quintrevion Wisner	RB	December 2, 2024	

=== National honors ===
==== All-Americans ====
NCAA Recognized All-American Honors
Player	AP	AFCA	FWAA	TSN	WCFF	Designation
Alfred Collins	2nd	–	–	–	–	–
Anthony Hill Jr.	2nd	2nd	–	2nd	2nd	–
Jahdae Barron	**1st**	2nd	**1st**	**1st**	2nd	Consensus
Kelvin Banks Jr.	**1st**	**1st**	**1st**	**1st**	**1st**	Unanimous
Michael Taaffe	2nd	–	–	–	–	–
The NCAA recognizes a selection to all five of the AP, AFCA, FWAA, TSN and WCFF first teams for unanimous selections and three of five for consensus selections. 1st team in **bold**. HM = Honorable mention. Source:

Other All-American Honors
Player	Athletic	Athlon	BR	CBS Sports	CFN	ESPN	FOX Sports	Phil Steele	PFF	SI	USA Today
Alfred Collins	–		–	–	–	–		3rd	–	2nd	2nd
Andrew Mukuba	–		–	–	3rd	–		HM	–	–	–
Anthony Hill Jr.	**1st**		–	–	–	**1st**		2nd	–	**1st**	–
Gunnar Helm	–		–	–	HM	–		HM	–	–	–
Jahdae Barron	**1st**		**1st**	**1st**	2nd	**1st**		**1st**	**1st**	2nd	**1st**
Kelvin Banks Jr.	**1st**		**1st**	**1st**	2nd	**1st**		**1st**	**1st**	**1st**	**1st**
Michael Taaffe	–		–	–	**1st**	2nd		HM	**1st**	–	–

Postseason National Honors
Honors	Player	Position	Date Awarded	Ref.
Lombardi Award	Kelvin Banks Jr.	OL	December 11, 2024	
Outland Trophy	Kelvin Banks Jr.	OL	December 12, 2024	
Jim Thorpe Award	Jahdae Barron	DB	December 12, 2024	
Shaun Alexander Freshman of the Year Award	Colin Simmons	EDGE	December 26, 2024	

Weekly National Honors
Honors	Player	Position	Date Awarded	Ref.
Davey O'Brien Great 8	Quinn Ewers	QB	September 2, 2024	
Davey O'Brien Great 8	Quinn Ewers	QB	September 9, 2024	
Manning Award Star of the Week	Quinn Ewers	QB	September 9, 2024	
Maxwell Award Player of the Week	Quinn Ewers	QB	September 10, 2024	
Earl Campbell Tyler Rose Award Player of the Week	Quinn Ewers	QB	September 10, 2024	
Outland Trophy’s National Player of the Week	Jake Majors	OL	September 10, 2024	
Jim Thorpe Award National Defensive Back of the Week	Andrew Mukuba	DB	September 10, 2024	
Davey O'Brien Great 8	Arch Manning	QB	September 16, 2024	
Earl Campbell Tyler Rose Award Player of the Week	Arch Manning	QB	September 17, 2024	
Walter Camp National Defensive Player of the Week	Anthony Hill Jr.	LB	October 15, 2024	
Lott IMPACT Trophy Player of the Week	Anthony Hill Jr.	LB	October 16, 2024	
Burlsworth Trophy Walk-On of the Week	Michael Taaffe	DB	October 29, 2024	
Davey O'Brien Great 8	Quinn Ewers	QB	November 11, 2024	
East-West Shrine Bowl’s Monday Morning Quarterback	Quinn Ewers	QB	November 11, 2024	
East-West Shrine Bowl’s Texas Star of the Week	Matthew Golden	WR	November 12, 2024	
Jim Thorpe Award National Player of the Week	Jahdae Barron	DB	November 19, 2024	
East-West Shrine Bowl’s “Texas Star of the Week”	Michael Taaffe	DB	December 3, 2024	
Earl Campbell Tyler Rose Award’s Player of the Week	Quintrevion Wisner	RB	December 3, 2024	

== Statistics ==
Team Statistics
	Texas	Opponents
Total Points	528	245
Total Points per game	33.0	15.3
Total Touchdowns	68	27
Total First Downs	354	263
Rushing	138	104
Passing	188	135
Penalties	28	24
Rushing Total Yards	2,944 yds	2,196 yds
Rushing yards for loss	404 yds	438 yds
Rushing Attempts	586	542
Average Per Rushing ATTs	4.3	3.2
Average Per Game	158.8	109.9
Rushing TDs	26	15
Passing Total Yards	4,460 yds	2,781 yds
Comp–Att-INTs	357-541-14	292-489-22
Average Per Game	278.8	173.8
Average per attempt	8.2	5.7
Passing TDs	40	9
Total Offensive plays	1,127	1,031
Total Yards	7,000 yds	4,539 yds
Average per play	6.2	4.4
Average per game	437.5	283.7
Kickoff Returns: # – Yards- TDs	15-294-0	23-381-0
Average per kickoff	19.6	16.6
Punt Returns: # – Yards- TDs	30-315-0	16-150-0
Average per punt	10.5	9.4
INT Returns: # – Yards- TDs	22-182-0	14-130-0
Average per interceptions	8.3	9.3
Kicking - Punt Yards	0-2,080	0-3,498
Punt average per games	40.8	43.2
Punt net. average	35.9	37.3
FG: FGM - FGA	16-25	18-25
Onside kicks	0-0	0-2
Penalties – Yards	102-829	90-765
Average per games (YRDS)	51.8	47.8
Time of possession	07:57:47	08:02:13
Average per game	29:52	30:08
Miscellaneous: 3rd–Down Conversion %	42.6%	31.4%
Miscellaneous:4th–Down Conversion %	54.6%	48.7%
Sacks - Yards	47–321	37–225
Fumbles – Fumbles Lost	26-12	24–9
Miscellaneous: Yards	0	0
Red Zone: Score-attempts	55-69	27-39
Red Zone: Touchdowns	44-69	18–39

=== Individual statistics ===
Passing statistics
#	NAME	POS	RAT	CMP	ATT	YDS	AVG/G	CMP%	TD	INT	LONG
3	Quinn Ewers	QB	149.0	293	445	3,472	248.0	65.8%	31	12	54
16	Arch Manning	QB	184.0	61	90	939	93.9	67.8%	9	2	75
2	Matthew Golden	WR	176.0	1	2	30	1.9	50.0%	0	0	30
15	Trey Owens	QB	89.9	2	4	19	6.3	50.0%	0	0	16
	TOTALS		154.5	357	541	4,460	278.8	66.0%	40	14	75

Rushing statistics
#	NAME	POS	ATT	YDS	AVG	TD	LONG	AVG/G
26	Quintrevion Wisner	RB	226	1,064	4.7	5	43	70.9
23	Jaydon Blue	RB	134	730	5.4	8	77	48.7
9	Jerrick Gibson	RB	78	377	4.8	4	25	25.1
16	Arch Manning	QB	25	108	4.3	4	67	10.8
5	Ryan Wingo	WR	5	100	20.0	0	55	6.3
27	Colin Page	RB	18	99	5.5	0	23	19.8
7	Isaiah Bond	WR	4	98	24.5	1	44	7.0
24	Velton Gardner	RB	8	26	3.3	0	10	13.0
21	Ryan Niblett	WR/RB	8	23	2.9	1	7	1.5
29	Reid Watkins	RB	4	15	3.8	0	6	15.0
15	Trey Owens	QB	1	3	3.0	0	3	1.0
11	Silas Bolden	WR	2	-3	-1.5	1	5	-0.1
3	Quinn Ewers	QB	57	-82	-1.4	2	26	
	TOTALS		586	2,540	4.3	26	77	158.8

Receiving statistics
#	NAME	POS	REC	YDS	AVG	TD	LONG	AVG/G
2	Matthew Golden	WR	58	987	17.0	9	54	61.7
85	Gunnar Helm	TE	60	786	13.1	7	49	49.1
7	Isaiah Bond	WR	34	540	15.9	5	56	38.6
5	Ryan Wingo	WR	29	472	16.3	2	75	29.5
0	DeAndre Moore Jr.	WR	39	456	11.7	7	50	28.5
23	Jaydon Blue	RB	42	368	8.8	6	45	24.5
26	Quintrevion Wisner	RB	44	311	7.1	1	50	20.7
11	Silas Bolden	WR	23	267	11.6	1	24	16.7
1	Johntay Cook II	WR	8	137	17.1	2	40	22.8
81	Juan Davis	TE	9	54	6.0	0	11	3.4
8	Amari Niblack	TE	5	33	6.6	0	20	3.7
9	Jerrick Gibson	RB	3	25	8.3	0	9	1.7
21	Ryan Niblett	WR/RB	3	24	8.0	0	15	1.6
	TOTALS		357	4,460	12.5	40	75	278.8

==== Defense ====
Defense statistics
#	NAME	POS	SOLO	AST	TOT	TFL-YDS	SACK-YDS	INT	BU	QBH	FR	FF
0	Anthony Hill Jr.	LB	59	54	113.0	16.5-62	8.0-44	1	1	4	1	4
16	Michael Taaffe	DB	40	38	78.0	5.5-24	2.0-15	2	10	1	1	1
4	Andrew Mukuba	DB	41	28	69.0	4.0-19	0.0-0	5	6	1	0	1
7	Jahdae Barron	DB	46	21	67.0	2.5-8	1.0-6	5	11	2	1	0
18	Liona Lefau	LB	38	25	63.0	5.0-18	2.0-12	1	2	0	0	1
33	David Gbenda	LB	33	28	61.0	5.0-9	1.0-2	1	0	1	0	1
3	Jaylon Guilbeau	DB	35	23	58.0	5.5-14	1.0-7	0	3	0	0	0
95	Alfred Collins	DL	27	28	55.0	5.5-25	1.0-12	0	7	1	0	1
11	Colin Simmons	EDGE	31	17	48.0	14.0-73	9.0-64	1	2	9	0	3
88	Barryn Sorrell	EDGE	16	28	44.0	11.0-54	6.0-37	0	1	12	0	0
45	Vernon Broughton	DL	24	15	39.0	4.5-28	4.0-26	0	2	5	3	2
99	Jermayne Lole	DL	10	27	37.0	3.5-5	0.0-0	0	0	3	0	0
8	Trey Moore	EDGE	23	13	36.0	10.5-59	6.5-49	0	1	6	2	3
5	Malik Muhammad	DB	32	4	36.0	1.0-1	0.0-0	0	8	0	0	0
25	Jelani McDonald	DB	15	18	33.0	1.0-2	0.0-0	1	1	0	0	0
37	Morice Blackwell Jr.	LB	17	13	30.0	0.0-0	0.0-0	0	0	0	0	0
91	Ethan Burke	EDGE	17	10	27.0	9.0-29	2.0-14	1	4	1	0	0
26	Ty'Anthony Smith	LB	8	8	16.0	1.5-3	0.5-2	1	0	0	0	0
9	Gavin Holmes	DB	10	4	14.0	0.5-1	0.0-0	0	3	0	0	0
15	Bill Norton	DL	6	8	14.0	1.5-15	1.0-14	0	0	2	0	1
6	Kobe Black	DB	10	3	13.0	0.0-0	0.0-0	0	1	0	0	0
2	Derek Williams Jr.	DB	8	3	11.0	0.0-0	0.0-0	1	0	0	1	1
23	Jordon Johnson-Rubell	DB	6	2	8.0	0.0-0	0.0-0	0	0	0	0	0
92	Colton Vasek	EDGE	4	3	7.0	2.5-18	2.0-17	0	0	1	0	0
51	Marshall Landwehr	LB	4	2	6.0	0.0-0	0.0-0	0	0	0	0	0
24	Warren Roberson	DB	4	2	6.0	1.0-7	0.0-0	0	0	0	0	0
17	Xavier Filsaime	DB	3	2	5.0	0.0-0	0.0-0	0	0	0	0	0
1	Justice Finkley	EDGE	1	4	5.0	0.0-0	0.0-0	0	0	1	0	0
90	Sydir Mitchell	DL	1	3	4.0	0.5-0	0.0-0	0	0	0	0	0
98	Tiaoalii Savea	DL	2	2	4.0	1.0-1	0.0-0	0	0	0	0	0
97	Alex January	DL	1	2	3.0	0.0-0	0.0-0	0	0	0	0	0
21	Ryan Niblett	WR/RB	3	0	3.0	0.0-0	0.0-0	0	0	0	0	0
94	Jaray Bledsoe	DL	1	1	2.0	0.0-0	0.0-0	0	0	0	0	0
40	Derion Gullette	LB	2	0	2.0	0.0-0	0.0-0	0	0	0	0	0
27	Wardell Mack	DB	2	0	2.0	0.0-0	0.0-0	0	0	0	0	0
46	Tausili Akana	EDGE	0	1	1.0	0.0-0	0.0-0	0	0	0	0	0
78	Kelvin Banks Jr.	OL	1	0	1.0	0.0-0	0.0-0	0	0	0	0	0
11	Silas Bolden	WR	1	0	1.0	0.0-0	0.0-0	0	0	0	0	0
7	Isaiah Bond	WR	1	0	1.0	0.0-0	0.0-0	0	0	0	0	0
53	Aaron Bryant	DL	0	1	1.0	0.0-0	0.0-0	0	0	0	0	0
52	DJ Campbell	OL	1	0	1.0	0.0-0	0.0-0	0	0	0	0	0
13	Jay'Vion Cole	DB	1	0	1.0	0.0-0	0.0-0	1	0	0	0	0
38	Graham Gillespie	DB	1	0	1.0	0.0-0	0.0-0	0	0	0	0	0
2	Matthew Golden	WR	1	0	1.0	0.0-0	0.0-0	0	0	0	0	0
85	Gunnar Helm	TE	1	0	1.0	0.0-0	0.0-0	0	0	0	0	0
8	Amari Niblack	TE	0	1	1.0	0.5-1	0.0-0	0	0	0	0	0
15	Will Stone	K	1	0	1.0	0.0-0	0.0-0	0	0	0	0	0
5	Ryan Wingo	WR	0	1	1.0	0.0-0	0.0-0	0	0	0	0	0
26	Quintrevion Wisner	RB	1	0	1.0	0.0-0	0.0-0	0	0	0	0	0
84	Jordan Washington	TE	0	0	0.0	0.0-0	0.0-0	0	0	1	0	0
	TOTAL		595	446	1,041.0	113.0-476	47.0-321	22	63	51	9	19

Key: POS: Position, SOLO: Solo Tackles, AST: Assisted Tackles, TOT: Total Tackles, TFL: Tackles-for-loss, SACK: Quarterback Sacks, INT: Interceptions, BU: Passes Broken Up, PD: Passes Defended, QBH: Quarterback Hits, FR: Fumbles Recovered, FF: Forced Fumbles, BLK: Kicks or Punts Blocked, SAF: Safeties, TD : Touchdown

==== Special teams ====
Field goal statistics
#	NAME	POS	XPM	XPA	XP%	FGM	FGA	FG%	1–19	20–29	30–39	40–49	50+	LNG
45	Bert Auburn	K	64	64	100.0%	16	25	64.0%	0/0	6/6	4/5	6/12	0/2	49
	TOTALS		64	64	100.0%	16	25	64.0%	0/0	6/6	4/5	6/12	0/2	49

Kickoff statistics
#	NAME	POS	KICKS	YDS	AVG	TB	OB
15	Will Stone	K	98	6,236	63.6	56	0
	TOTALS		98	6,236	63.6	56	0

Punting statistics
#	NAME	POS	PUNTS	YDS	AVG	LONG	TB	I–20	50+	BLK
39	Michael Kern	P	41	1,706	41.6	57	3	10	4	0
49	Ian Ratliff	P	8	352	44.0	52	2	1	2	0
	TOTALS		51	2,080	40.8	57	5	11	6	0

Kick return statistics
#	NAME	POS	RTNS	YDS	AVG	TD	LNG
2	Matthew Golden	WR	14	285	20.4	0	31
11	Silas Bolden	WR	1	9	9.0	0	9
	TOTALS		15	294	19.6	0	31

Punt return statistics
#	NAME	POS	RTNS	YDS	AVG	TD	LONG
11	Silas Bolden	WR	30	315	10.5	1	75
	TOTALS		30	315	10.5	1	75

== Postseason ==
=== Bowl games ===
==== Senior Bowl ====
Player	#	Position	Class
Alfred Collins	95	DL	Senior
Andrew Mukuba	4	DB	Senior
Barryn Sorrell	88	EDGE	Senior
Gunnar Helm	85	TE	Senior
Vernon Broughton	45	DL	Senior

=== NFL ===
==== NFL draft ====
The NFL draft will be held at Lambeau Field in Green Bay, WI.

Longhorns in the 2025 NFL draft:

Round	Pick	Player	Position	NFL team
1st	9th	Kelvin Banks Jr.	OL	New Orleans Saints
1st	20th	Jahdae Barron	CB	Denver Broncos
1st	23rd	Matthew Golden	WR	Green Bay Packers
2nd	43rd	Alfred Collins	DT	San Francisco 49ers
2nd	64th	Andrew Mukuba	S	Philadelphia Eagles
3rd	71st	Vernon Broughton	DL	New Orleans Saints
4th	120th	Gunnar Helm	TE	Tennessee Titans
4th	124th	Barryn Sorrell	EDGE	Green Bay Packers
5th	149th	Jaydon Blue	RB	Dallas Cowboys
6th	207th	Cameron Williams	OT	Philadelphia Eagles
6th	211th	Hayden Conner	G	Arizona Cardinals
7th	231st	Quinn Ewers	QB	Miami Dolphins

==== NFL draft combine ====
2025 NFL Combine Participants
Name	POS	HT	WT	Arms	Hands	40	Bench Press	Vert Jump	Broad Jump	3 Cone Drill	20-yd Shuttle	10-yd Split	Ref
Alfred Collins	DT	6'6"	332	34 5/8"	10"	DNP	DNP	26"	8' 0"	DNP	DNP	DNP	
Andrew Mukuba	S	5'11"	186	30"	9"	4.45	DNP	DNP	DNP	DNP	DNP	1.53	
Barryn Sorrell	EDGE	6'3"	256	32 1/4"	9 1/4"	4.68	28	34"	10'1"	7.06	4.36	1.65	
Cameron Williams	OT	6'6"	317	34 1/2"	11 3/8"	DNP	DNP	DNP	DNP	DNP	DNP	DNP	
Gunnar Helm	TE	6'5"	241	32 3/4"	9 7/8"	4.84	DNP	30"	DNP	7.15	4.4	1.69	
Hayden Conner	OG	6'6"	314	33 1/4"	9 5/8"	DNP	DNP	DNP	DNP	7.9	4.88	DNP	
Isaiah Bond	WR	5'11"	180	30 1/2"	8 1/2"	4.39	DNP	DNP	DNP	DNP	DNP	1.51	
Jahdae Barron	CB	5'11"	194	29 5/8"	9 1/2"	4.39	DNP	35"	10'3"	DNP	DNP	1.50	
Jake Majors	C	6'3"	306	30 3/8"	9 7/8"	DNP	25	DNP	DNP	DNP	DNP	DNP	
Jaydon Blue	RB	5'9"	196	29 7/8"	8 1/4"	4.38	DNP	DNP	DNP	DNP	DNP	1.52	
Kelvin Banks Jr.	OT	6'5"	315	33 1/2"	10 3/8"	5.16	DNP	32"	8'8"	7.81	4.66	1.79	
Matthew Golden	WR	5'11"	191	30 5/8"	9 1/2"	4.29	DNP	DNP	DNP	DNP	DNP	1.49	
Quinn Ewers	QB	6'2"	214	30 3/4"	9 3/8"	DNP	DNP	DNP	DNP	DNP	DNP	DNP	
Vernon Broughton	DT	6'5"	311	35"	9 1/4"	DNP	DNP	DNP	DNP	DNP	DNP	DNP	

† Top performer

DNP = Did not participate

== Rankings ==
Ranking movements Legend: ██ Increase in ranking ██ Decrease in ranking ( ) = First-place votes
	Week																
Poll	Pre	1	2	3	4	5	6	7	8	9	10	11	12	13	14	15	Final
AP	4	3	2 (4)	1 (35)	1 (44)	2 (19)	1 (52)	1 (56)	5	6	5	3	3	3	2	4	4
Coaches	4 (1)	3 (1)	3 (1)	2 (10)	2 (18)	1 (29)	1 (44)	1 (53)	6	6	5	3	3	3	2	4	3
CFP	Not released										5	3	3	3	2	3	Not released
