= Jerrick =

Jerrick is a surname and given name. Notable people with the name include:

Surname

- Mike Jerrick (born 1950), American news anchor

Given name

- Jerrick Ahanmisi (born 1997), American-born Filipino-Nigerian basketball player
- Jerrick Gibson, American football player
- Jerrick Harding (born 1998), American basketball player
- Jerrick Reed II (born 2000), American football player
