= Andrew Mukuba =

American football player (born 2002)

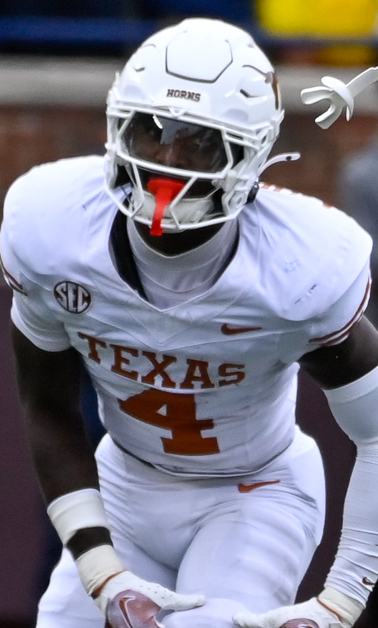
- Mukuba with the Texas Longhorns in 2024

No. 24 – Philadelphia Eagles
- Position: Safety
- Roster status: Active

Personal information
- Born: December 7, 2002 (age 23); Harare, Zimbabwe
- Listed height: 5 ft 11 in (1.80 m)
- Listed weight: 186 lb (84 kg)

Career information
- High school: Lyndon B. Johnson (Austin, Texas, U.S.)
- College: Clemson (2021–2023); Texas (2024)
- NFL draft: 2025: 2nd round, 64th overall pick

Career history
- Philadelphia Eagles (2025–present)

Awards and highlights
- Third-team All-SEC (2024); Third-team All-ACC (2021); Freshman All-American (2021); ACC Defensive Rookie of the Year (2021)

Career NFL statistics as of Week 5, 2026
- Tackles: 69
- Sacks: 0.5
- Pass deflections: 4
- Interceptions: 3
- Stats at Pro Football Reference

Andrew Mukuba Sr. (born December 7, 2002) is an American professional football safety for the Philadelphia Eagles of the National Football League (NFL). He played college football for the Clemson Tigers and Texas Longhorns. Mukuba was selected by the Eagles in the second round of the 2025 NFL draft.

== Early life ==
Mukuba was born in Harare, Zimbabwe on December 7, 2002. His parents and older siblings were refugees from the Democratic Republic of the Congo. During his early years in Zimbabwe, he would sleep on the floor with his other siblings in a house that had limited electricity. He immigrated to Austin, Texas with his family when he was nine years old after being granted asylum in 2012. His parents split when he was very young, and started living only with his mother, Tshala Bilolo, who worked as a housekeeper in a hotel. Mukuba's introduction to football took place when he was in fifth grade, when his P.E. teacher, Shannon Crenshaw, helped him learn how to play it during gym class. After Mukuba quickly began to pick up the sport, Crenshaw, who ran a youth football organization with his wife, recruited Mukuba to join his team, the Austin Steelers. Mukuba would later attend Lyndon B. Johnson High School, playing football and competing in track and field, running events such as 100 meters, 200 meters, 400 meters, and long jump. He was rated a four-star recruit, and graduated early from high school. He committed to play college football at Clemson over offers from LSU and Texas.

== College career ==
=== Clemson ===
Mukuba joined the Clemson Tigers in January 2021 as an early enrollee. He was named a starter at safety and became the first defensive back to start in a season opener for Clemson since freshman became eligible to play in 1973. Mukuba was named the Atlantic Coast Conference (ACC) Defensive Rookie of the Year and third team All-ACC after finishing the season with 47 tackles, two tackles for loss, one sack, seven passes broken up and a fumble recovery. In his sophomore year, he recorded 54 tackles and one interception. In his junior year, he recorded 42 tackles and one fumble recovery. At the end of the season, he entered the transfer portal.

=== Texas ===
On December 18, 2023, Mukuba transferred to the Texas Longhorns, where he was a Physical Culture and Sports major. In his senior season, he recorded 69 tackles, 5 interceptions, and one forced fumble. At the end of the season, he was named to the All-SEC third team.

== Professional career ==
Pre-draft measurables
Height	Weight	Arm length	Hand span	Wingspan	40-yard dash	10-yard split	20-yard split	20-yard shuttle	Three-cone drill
5 ft 11 1/4 in (1.81 m)	186 lb (84 kg)	30 in (0.76 m)	9 in (0.23 m)	6 ft 3 3/8 in (1.91 m)	4.45 s	1.53 s	2.60 s	4.45 s	7.15 s
All values from NFL Combine/Pro Day

=== 2025 season ===
Mukuba was selected by the Philadelphia Eagles with the 64th overall pick in the second round of the 2025 NFL draft. Mukuba signed his four-year rookie contract worth $7.16 million. Mukuba made his NFL debut in Week 1 against the Dallas Cowboys and recorded four tackles. The following week against the Kansas City Chiefs, Mukuba recorded his first NFL interception when he caught a ball that deflected off of the hands of tight end Travis Kelce, returning it for 41 yards. He also had six tackles, 0.5 sacks, and one pass deflection. In Week 7 against the Minnesota Vikings, Mukuba recorded three total tackles and an interception on former Eagles quarterback Carson Wentz. In Week 12 against Dallas, Mukuba suffered an ankle fracture that would require surgery; he was placed on injured reserve on November 26, 2025. In 11 appearances (10 starts) for Philadelphia, Mukuba recorded two interceptions, three pass deflections, and 46 combined tackles.

== Career statistics ==
=== NFL ===
Legend
**Bold**	Career high

Year	Team	Games		Tackles					Interceptions				Fumbles			
Year	Team	GP	GS	Cmb	Solo	Ast	Sck	TFL	PD	Int	Yds	TD	FF	FR	Yds	TD
2025	PHI	11	10	46	27	19	0.5	2	3	2	41	0	0	0	0	0
Career		11	10	46	27	19	0.5	2	3	2	41	0	0	0	0	0

=== College ===
Year	Team	GP	Tackles					Interceptions					Fumbles	
Year	Team	GP	Solo	Ast	Tot	Loss	Sk	Int	Yds	Avg	TD	PD	FF	FR
2021	Clemson	13	30	17	47	2.0	**1.0**	0	0	0.0	0	**7**	0	**1**
2022	Clemson	12	32	22	54	0.5	0.0	1	0	0.0	0	3	0	0
2023	Clemson	10	28	14	42	2.0	0.0	0	0	0.0	0	6	0	**1**
2024	Texas	**15**	**41**	**28**	**69**	**4.0**	0.0	**5**	**12**	**2.4**	0	**7**	**1**	0
Career		50	131	81	212	8.5	1.0	6	12	0.6	0	23	2	2

== Personal life ==
Mukuba has a son, Andrew Mukuba Jr., who was born in September 2023.
