= David Gbenda =

American football linebacker (born 2000)

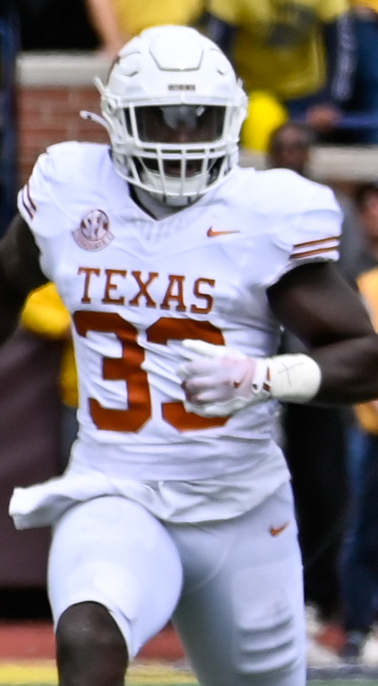
- Gbenda with the Texas Longhorns in 2024

Saskatchewan Roughriders
- Position: Linebacker
- Roster status: Practice squad
- CFL status: American

Personal information
- Born: December 12, 2000 (age 25); Katy, Texas, U.S.
- Listed height: 5 ft 11 in (1.80 m)
- Listed weight: 236 lb (107 kg)

Career information
- High school: Cinco Ranch (Cinco Ranch, Texas)
- College: Texas (2019–2024)
- NFL draft: 2025: undrafted

Career history
- Tennessee Titans (2025)*; Saskatchewan Roughriders (2026–present)
- * Offseason or practice squad member only
- Stats at Pro Football Reference

David Gbenda (born December 12, 2000) is an American professional football linebacker for the Saskatchewan Roughriders in the Canadian Football League (CFL). He played college football for the Texas Longhorns.

== Early life ==
Gbenda attended Cinco Ranch High School in Cinco Ranch, Texas. As a junior, he totaled 56 tackles with eight going for a loss, and two sacks, earning first-team all-district and All-American honors. Coming out of high school, Gbenda was rated as a four-star recruit and committed to play college football for the Texas Longhorns over offers from schools such as Arkansas, Baylor, Nebraska, Notre Dame, Ole Miss, TCU, and Texas A&M.

== College career ==
In his first four years with Texas from 2019 through 2022, Gbenda appeared in 32 games where he made three starts for the Longhorns, notching 55 tackles with two being for a loss, a sack, two pass deflections, and an interception in a limited role. He finished the 2023 season with 50 tackles with three and a half being for a loss, a sack and a half, and a pass deflection. Instead of declaring for the 2024 NFL draft, Gbenda decided to return to play for the Longhorns in his final season of eligibility in 2024. He entered the season as one of the starting linebackers for the Longhorns. In week 5, Gbenda notched eight tackles with one being for a loss in a win over Mississippi State.

== Professional career ==
Pre-draft measurables
Height	Weight	Arm length	Hand span	Wingspan	40-yard dash	10-yard split	20-yard split	20-yard shuttle	Three-cone drill	Vertical jump	Broad jump	Bench press
5 ft 11 1/2 in (1.82 m)	236 lb (107 kg)	32 1/2 in (0.83 m)	10 1/8 in (0.26 m)	6 ft 6 1/2 in (1.99 m)	4.74 s	1.64 s	2.62 s	4.33 s	7.20 s	32.5 in (0.83 m)	9 ft 9 in (2.97 m)	18 reps
All values from Pro Day

=== Tennessee Titans ===
On May 8, 2025, Gbenda signed with the Tennessee Titans as an undrafted free agent after going unselected in the 2025 NFL draft. He was waived on August 12.

=== Saskatchewan Roughriders ===
Gbenda signed with the Saskatchewan Roughriders in the Canadian Football League on March 31, 2026. On May 30, he was added to the practice squad. On June 12th, Gbenda was placed on the active roster and a day later made his pro football debut against the BC Lions, recording a special teams sack.

== Career statistics ==
=== CFL ===
Year	Team	GP	Tackles			Interceptions					Fumbles			
Year	Team	GP	Tkl	TfL	Sck	Int	Yds	Avg	TD	PD	FR	Yds	TD	FF
2026	Roughriders	15	2	0	0	0	0	0	0	0	0	0	0	0
Career		15	0	0	0	0	0	0	0	0	0	0	0	0

=== College ===
Year	Team	GP	Tackles					Interceptions					Fumbles			
Year	Team	GP	Solo	Ast	Cmb	TfL	Sck	Int	Yds	Avg	TD	PD	FR	Yds	TD	FF
2019	Texas	4	0	1	1	0	0.0	0	0	0.0	0	0	0	0	0	0
2020	Texas	10	10	9	19	0	0.0	1	0	0.0	0	0	0	0	0	0
2021	Texas	11	17	10	27	3	1.5	0	0	0.0	0	2	0	0	0	0
2022	Texas	8	8	4	12	0	0.0	0	0	0.0	0	0	0	0	0	0
2023	Texas	14	23	27	50	4	1.5	0	0	0.0	0	1	0	0	0	0
2024	Texas	16	33	28	61	5	1.0	1	-3	-1.5	0	0	0	0	0	1
Career		63	91	79	170	12	4.0	2	-3	-1.5	0	3	0	0	0	1
