= Alfred Collins (American football) =

American football player (born 2001)

No. 95 – San Francisco 49ers
- Position: Defensive tackle
- Roster status: Injured reserve

Personal information
- Born: October 8, 2001 (age 25); Bastrop, Texas, U.S.
- Listed height: 6 ft 5 in (1.96 m)
- Listed weight: 332 lb (151 kg)

Career information
- High school: Cedar Creek (Cedar Creek, Texas)
- College: Texas (2020–2024)
- NFL draft: 2025: 2nd round, 43rd overall pick

Career history
- San Francisco 49ers (2025–present)

Awards and highlights
- Second-team All-American (2024); First-team All-SEC (2024)

Career NFL statistics as of 2025
- Tackles: 17
- Sacks: 1.0
- Forced fumbles: 2
- Fumble recoveries: 2
- Pass deflections: 2
- Stats at Pro Football Reference

Alfred Collins (born October 8, 2001) is an American professional football defensive lineman for the San Francisco 49ers of the National Football League (NFL). He played college football for the Texas Longhorns and was selected by the 49ers in the second round of the 2025 NFL draft.

== Early life ==
Collins was born on October 8, 2001, in Bastrop, Texas. He attended Cedar Creek High School in Cedar Creek, Texas, where he lettered in football, basketball and track & field. In his high school career, Collins made 253 total tackles (180 solo and 73 assisted), 74.0 tackles for loss and 18.0 sacks. Collins would also make five pass breakups and five fumble recoveries. He played in the 2020 All-American Bowl. Collins was a five-star rated recruit and committed to play college football at the University of Texas at Austin over offers from Alabama, Baylor, Oklahoma and Texas A&M.

== College career ==
During Collins' true freshman season in 2020, he played in all 10 games and started one of them. He finished the season with 18 recorded tackles (11 solo and seven assisted), two tackles for loss, 1.5 sacks and two pass breakups. During the 2021 season, he played in all 12 games and started four of them, finishing the season with 25 registered tackles (15 solo and 10 assisted), five tackles for loss, two sacks, one forced fumble and four quarterback hurries. During the 2022 season, he played in 12 games and started one of them, finishing the season with 17 total tackles (seven solo and 10 assisted), three tackles for loss and one sack. During the 2023 season, he played in all 14 games and started six of them, finishing the season with 22 total tackles (12 solo and 10 assisted), two tackles for loss and two pass breakups. He was also named to the preseason watch list for the Reese's Senior Bowl.

On January 5, 2024, Collins announced that he would return to the Longhorns for the 2024 season.

== Professional career ==
Pre-draft measurables
Height	Weight	Arm length	Hand span	Wingspan	Vertical jump	Broad jump
6 ft 5 5/8 in (1.97 m)	332 lb (151 kg)	34 5/8 in (0.88 m)	10 in (0.25 m)	7 ft 1 in (2.16 m)	26.0 in (0.66 m)	8 ft 0 in (2.44 m)
All values from NFL Combine

Collins was selected in the second round with the 43rd overall pick by the San Francisco 49ers in the 2025 NFL draft. He signed his four-year rookie contract on July 16, 2025 worth $10.31 million. Collins made his NFL debut in Week 1 against the Seattle Seahawks, recording one tackle. In Week 5 against the Los Angeles Rams, Collins recorded his first career forced fumble where he punched the ball out on the one-yard line to secure the turnover that helped lead to a 26–23 overtime victory for San Francisco.

On September 8, 2026, during a team practice in Melbourne, Australia prior to the 49ers' season-opening game against the Los Angeles Rams, Collins tore his patellar tendon and was declared out for the season.

== Career statistics ==
=== NFL ===
==== Regular season ====
Year	Team	Games		Tackles					Interceptions						Fumbles				
Year	Team	GP	GS	Cmb	Solo	Ast	Sck	TFL	Int	Yds	Avg	Lng	TD	PD	FF	Fum	FR	Yds	TD
2025	SF	16	1	17	4	13	1.0	1	0	0	0.0	0	0	2	2	0	2	0	0
Career		16	1	17	4	13	1.0	1	0	0	0.0	0	0	2	2	0	2	0	0

==== Postseason ====
Year	Team	Games		Tackles					Interceptions						Fumbles				
Year	Team	GP	GS	Cmb	Solo	Ast	Sck	TFL	Int	Yds	Avg	Lng	TD	PD	FF	Fum	FR	Yds	TD
2025	SF	2	0	2	1	1	0.0	0	0	0	0.0	0	0	0	0	0	0	0	0
Career		2	0	2	1	1	0.0	0	0	0	0.0	0	0	0	0	0	0	0	0

=== College ===
Year	Team	GP	Tackles					Interceptions					Fumbles			
Year	Team	GP	Solo	Ast	Cmb	TfL	Sck	Int	Yds	Avg	TD	PD	FR	Yds	TD	FF
2020	Texas	10	12	10	22	2	1.0	1	0	0.0	0	3	0	0	0	0
2021	Texas	12	15	10	25	5	2.0	0	0	0.0	0	0	0	0	0	1
2022	Texas	12	7	10	17	3	1.0	0	0	0.0	0	0	0	0	0	0
2023	Texas	14	12	10	22	2	2.0	0	0	0.0	0	2	0	0	0	0
2024	Texas	16	27	28	55	6	1.0	0	0	0.0	0	7	0	0	0	1
Career		64	73	68	141	18	7.0	1	0	0.0	0	12	0	0	0	2

== Personal life ==
His older cousin is Houston Texans offensive tackle, and 49ers draftee, Trent Brown.
