= Silas Bolden =

American football player (born 2001)

Profile
- Positions: Wide receiver, return specialist

Personal information
- Born: November 9, 2001 (age 24); Fontana, California, U.S.
- Listed height: 5 ft 8 in (1.73 m)
- Listed weight: 160 lb (73 kg)

Career information
- High school: Rancho Cucamonga (Rancho Cucamonga, California)
- College: Oregon State (2020–2023); Texas (2024)
- NFL draft: 2025: undrafted

Career history
- Minnesota Vikings (2025)*; Houston Texans (2025)*; Dallas Renegades (2026)*; BC Lions (2026)
- * Offseason or practice squad member only

Awards and highlights
- 2× Second-team All-Pac-12 (2022, 2023)

Silas Bolden (born November 9, 2001) is an American professional football wide receiver and return specialist. He played college football for the Oregon State Beavers and Texas Longhorns. He played professionally for the BC Lions of the Canadian Football League and was on the practice squad for the Houston Texans of the NFL. He also went to the training camp of the NFL's Minnesota Vikings and the UFL's Dallas Renegades.

== Early life ==
Bolden attended Rancho Cucamonga High School in Rancho Cucamonga, California, where he caught 132 passes for 2,091 yards and 23 touchdowns and rushed for 290 yards and two touchdowns. He also recorded eight tackles and an interception on defense. Bolden committed to play college football at Oregon State over other schools such as Hawaii, San Jose State, and Utah State.

== College career ==
=== Oregon State ===
As a freshman at Oregon State University in 2020, Bolden only played one game, returning one kickoff for 17 yards. In 2021, he played 10 games and hauled in three receptions for 25 yards, while also rushing for 13 yards. In week two of the 2022 season, Bolden scored his first career touchdown on a 36-yard rush and brought in one reception for 15 yards in a 35–32 win over Fresno State. In week 3 he caught his first receiving touchdown on a 24-yard catch and returned a kickoff for 80 yards in an 68–28 win over Montana State. In week 5, Bolden caught two passes for 19 yards and had a 29-yard rush for a touchdown in a 42–16 loss to Utah. The next week, he caught two passes for 41 yards and a touchdown in a 28–27 win over Stanford. The next week against Washington State, Bolden returned a kick for 60 yards, adding 14 rushing yards and one catch for four yards, as the Beavers won 24–10. In week 11, he made five receptions for 54 yards in a 31–7 win over Arizona State. In the season finale, Bolden caught two passes for 23 yards and rushed for 14 yards in a 38–34 win over rival Oregon. In the 2022 Las Vegas Bowl, he brought in six receptions for 99 yards and a touchdown in a 30–3 win over Florida. Bolden finished the year with 23 catches for 305 receiving yards and four touchdowns, 105 rushing yards and two touchdowns, and 22 kickoff returns for 599 yards. He was named second-team all-Pac-12 as a return specialist. Ahead of the 2023 season, Bolden was named a preseason second-team all-Pac-12 member as a return specialist.

On January 1, 2024, Bolden announced that he would be entering the transfer portal.

=== Texas ===
On January 16, 2024, Bolden announced that he would be transferring to the University of Texas at Austin for his senior season. He was the starting punt returner. In the Red River Rivalry game against Oklahoma, Bolden recovered a fumble by Quintrevion Wisner at the end zone, scoring a touchdown for the Longhorns. In the 2024 Peach Bowl against Arizona State, Bolden scored a 75-yard punt return touchdown, making him the first Longhorn to score a punt return touchdown since Xavier Worthy in 2023.

=== College statistics ===
Year	Team	Games		Receiving				Rushing				Kick returns				Punt returns			
Year	Team	GP	GS	Rec	Yds	Avg	TD	Att	Yds	Avg	TD	Ret	Yds	Avg	TD	Ret	Yds	Avg	TD
2020	Oregon	1	0	0	0	0.0	0	0	0	0.0	0	1	17	17.0	0	0	0	0.0	0
2021	Oregon	10	1	3	25	8.3	0	3	13	4.3	0	0	0	0.0	0	0	0	0.0	0
2022	Oregon	13	3	23	305	13.3	4	9	105	11.7	2	22	599	27.2	0	0	0	0.0	0
2023	Oregon	13	10	54	746	13.8	5	9	84	9.3	2	17	392	23.1	0	3	97	32.3	1
2024	Texas	16	0	23	267	11.6	1	2	-3	-1.5	1	1	9	9.0	0	30	315	10.5	1
Career		53	14	103	1,343	13.0	10	23	199	8.7	5	41	1,017	24.8	0	33	412	12.5	2

== Professional career ==
Pre-draft measurables
Height	Weight	Arm length	Hand span	Wingspan	40-yard dash	10-yard split	20-yard split	20-yard shuttle	Three-cone drill	Vertical jump	Broad jump
5 ft 7 1/2 in (1.71 m)	162 lb (73 kg)	29 3/8 in (0.75 m)	8 1/2 in (0.22 m)	5 ft 11 in (1.80 m)	4.53 s	1.62 s	2.59 s	4.41 s	7.30 s	34.0 in (0.86 m)	10 ft 2 in (3.10 m)
All values from Pro Day

=== Minnesota Vikings ===
Bolden signed with the Minnesota Vikings as an undrafted free agent on April 26, 2025. In 3 preseason games, he had one catch for three yards, three kick returns for 76 yards, and one punt return for eight yards. He was waived on August 24 as part of preliminary roster cuts.

=== Houston Texans ===
On September 3, 2025, Bolden was signed to the Houston Texans practice squad. He was released on September 14.

On September 23, 2025 he had a tryout with the Falcons.

=== Dallas Renegades ===
Bolden was drafted by the Dallas Renegades in Day 2 of the 2026 UFL Draft. After attending training camp, he was released on March 19.

=== BC Lions ===
On April 15, 2026, Bolden signed with the BC Lions of the Canadian Football League (CFL). On May 31, he was assigned to the Lions' practice roster to start the 2026 CFL season. On June 18, Bolden was promoted to the Lions' active roster. On July 2, he was reassigned to the Lions' practice roster. He was released on August 19, 2026.

== Personal life ==
Bolden is the younger brother of NFL wide receiver Victor Bolden Jr.
