= Vernon Broughton =

American football player (born 2001)

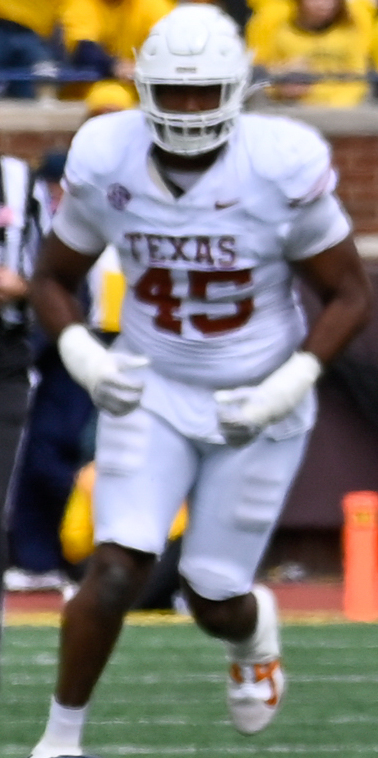
- Broughton with the Texas Longhorns in 2024

No. 91 – New Orleans Saints
- Position: Defensive tackle
- Roster status: Active

Personal information
- Born: July 15, 2001 (age 25); Houston, Texas, U.S.
- Listed height: 6 ft 5 in (1.96 m)
- Listed weight: 311 lb (141 kg)

Career information
- High school: Cypress Ridge (Harris County, Texas)
- College: Texas (2020–2024)
- NFL draft: 2025: 3rd round, 71st overall pick

Career history
- New Orleans Saints (2025–present)

Career NFL statistics as of Week 4, 2026
- Tackles: 9
- Forced fumbles: 1
- Fumble recoveries: 1
- Stats at Pro Football Reference

Vernon Broughton II (born July 15, 2001) is an American professional football defensive tackle for the New Orleans Saints of the National Football League (NFL). He played college football for the Texas Longhorns and was selected by the Saints in the third round of the 2025 NFL draft.

== Early life ==
Broughton attended Cypress Ridge High School in Harris County, Texas. He was rated as a four-star recruit and the 79th overall player in the class of 2020, and committed to play college football for the Texas Longhorns over offers from schools such as LSU, Ohio State, and Texas A&M.

== College career ==
In his first three collegiate season from 2020 to 2022, Broughton appeared in 25 games for Texas, where he totaled 13 tackles with two being for a loss, and a sack. In 2023, he tallied 17 tackles with five being for a loss, a sack, and a fumble recovery for the Longhorns. Broughton entered the 2024 season as a starter on the Longhorns defensive line. In the 2024 regular season finale, he recorded two sacks and the game-sealing fumble recovery against rival Texas A&M, earning SEC co-defensive player of the week honors. In the 2024 SEC Championship Game, Broughton totaled six tackles against Georgia. During the 2024 season, he played all 15 games, notching 39 tackle with four and a half being for a loss, four sacks, two forced fumbles, and three fumble recoveries.

== Professional career ==
Broughton declared for the 2025 NFL draft. He initially accepted an invite to play in the 2025 Senior Bowl, but later dropped out of the bowl.

Pre-draft measurables
Height	Weight	Arm length	Hand span	Wingspan
6 ft 5 in (1.96 m)	311 lb (141 kg)	35 in (0.89 m)	9 1/4 in (0.23 m)	6 ft 11 7/8 in (2.13 m)
All values from NFL Combine

Broughton was selected by the New Orleans Saints with the 71st pick in the third round of the 2025 NFL draft. He signed his four-year rookie contract worth 6.64 million. Broughton made his NFL debut in Week 2 against the San Francisco 49ers and recorded 3 tackles. However, he suffered a season-ending hip injury in the contest, and was placed on injured reserve on September 17.

== Career statistics ==
=== NFL ===
==== Regular season ====
Year	Team	Games		Tackles					Interceptions				Fumbles			
Year	Team	GP	GS	Cmb	Solo	Ast	Sck	TFL	PD	Int	Yds	TD	FF	FR	Yds	TD
2025	NOR	1	0	3	0	3	0.0	0	0	0	0	0	0	0	0	0
Career		1	0	3	0	3	0.0	0	0	0	0	0	0	0	0	0
Source: pro-football-reference.com

=== College ===
Year	Team	GP	Tackles					Interceptions					Fumbles			
Year	Team	GP	Solo	Ast	Cmb	TfL	Sck	Int	Yds	Avg	TD	PD	FR	Yds	TD	FF
2020	Texas	2	2	0	2	1	1.0	0	0	0.0	0	0	0	0	0	0
2021	Texas	12	1	4	5	1	0.5	0	0	0.0	0	0	0	0	0	0
2022	Texas	12	5	2	7	1	0.0	0	0	0.0	0	0	0	0	0	0
2023	Texas	14	7	10	17	5	1.0	0	0	0.0	0	1	1	0	0	0
2024	Texas	16	24	15	39	5	4.0	0	0	0.0	0	2	3	0	0	2
Career		56	39	31	70	13	6.5	0	0	0	0	3	4	0	0	2

== Personal life ==
Broughton is married to his wife Camille.
