= Barryn Sorrell =

American football player (born 2002)

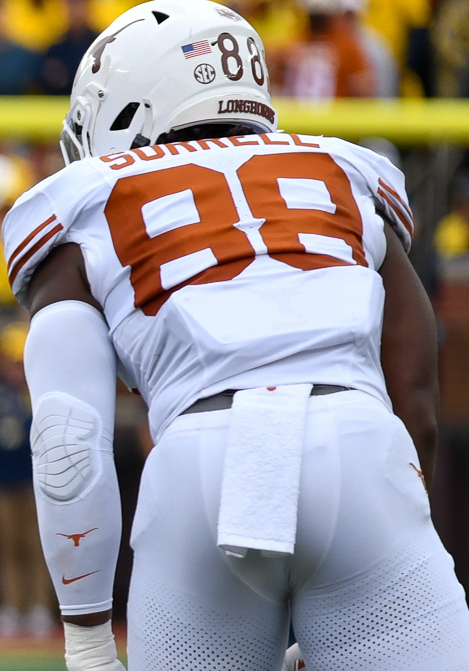
- Sorrell with the Texas Longhorns in 2024

No. 99 – Green Bay Packers
- Position: Outside linebacker
- Roster status: Active

Personal information
- Born: December 22, 2002 (age 23); New Orleans, Louisiana, U.S.
- Listed height: 6 ft 3 in (1.91 m)
- Listed weight: 256 lb (116 kg)

Career information
- High school: Holy Cross (New Orleans)
- College: Texas (2021–2024)
- NFL draft: 2025: 4th round, 124th overall pick

Career history
- Green Bay Packers (2025–present)

Career NFL statistics as of Week 10, 2026
- Total tackles: 47
- Sacks: 3.5
- Fumble recoveries: 1
- Stats at Pro Football Reference

Barryn Sorrell (born December 22, 2002) is an American professional football outside linebacker for the Green Bay Packers of the National Football League (NFL). He played college football for the Texas Longhorns and was selected by the Packers in the fourth round of the 2025 NFL draft.

== Early life ==
Sorrell grew up in New Orleans, Louisiana and attended Holy Cross School. He was ranked as the 54th strong-side defensive-end in the country and the 840th ranked player overall according to 247Sports. He was rated a three-star recruit and originally committed to play college football at Northwestern before flipping to Texas.

== College career ==
During Sorrell's true freshman season in 2021, he played in six games and finished the season with three solo tackles, four assisted tackles, and one tackle for loss for three yards. During the 2022 season, he played in 13 games and started 10 of them, finishing the season with 44 total tackles (16 solo and 28 assisted), nine tackles for loss for 55 yards, 5.5 sacks for 46 yards, seven quarterback hurries, one pass breakup and one forced fumble. During the 2023 season, he played in and started all 14 games, finishing the season with 37 total tackles (17 solo and 20 assisted), 4.5 tackles for loss for 33 yards and four sacks for 32 yards.

Sorrell announced that he would return for the 2024 season. He finished the year with 44 tackles and six sacks.

== Professional career ==
Pre-draft measurables
Height	Weight	Arm length	Hand span	Wingspan	40-yard dash	10-yard split	20-yard split	20-yard shuttle	Three-cone drill	Vertical jump	Broad jump	Bench press
6 ft 3 1/4 in (1.91 m)	256 lb (116 kg)	32 1/4 in (0.82 m)	9 1/4 in (0.23 m)	6 ft 5 7/8 in (1.98 m)	4.68 s	1.65 s	2.75 s	4.36 s	7.06 s	34.0 in (0.86 m)	10 ft 1 in (3.07 m)	28 reps
All values from NFL Combine

Sorrell was selected by the Green Bay Packers in the fourth round (124th overall) of the 2025 NFL draft. On May 2, 2025, he signed his rookie contract with the Packers worth $5.14 million.

Sorrell made his NFL debut in Week 2 against the Washington Commanders, recording one tackle and 0.5 sacks in the 27–18 win. He made his first career start in Week 18 against the Minnesota Vikings, recording eight tackles, one sack, and one fumble recovery.

== Career statistics ==
=== NFL ===
==== Regular season ====
Year	Team	Games		Tackles					Interceptions				Fumbles			
Year	Team	GP	GS	Cmb	Solo	Ast	Sck	TFL	PD	Int	Yds	TD	FF	FR	Yds	TD
2025	GB	14	1	15	7	8	1.5	1	0	0	0	0	0	1	7	0
2026	GB	5	5	14	7	7	0.5	0	0	0	0	0	0	0	0	0
Career		19	6	29	14	15	2.0	1	0	0	0	0	0	1	7	0
Source: pro-football-reference.com

==== Postseason ====
Year	Team	Games		Tackles					Interceptions				Fumbles			
Year	Team	GP	GS	Cmb	Solo	Ast	Sck	TFL	PD	Int	Yds	TD	FF	FR	Yds	TD
2025	GB	1	0	1	0	1	0.0	0	0	0	0	0	0	0	0	0
Career		1	0	1	0	1	0.0	0	0	0	0	0	0	0	0	0
Source: pro-football-reference.com

=== College ===
Year	Team	GP	Tackles					Interceptions					Fumbles			
Year	Team	GP	Solo	Ast	Cmb	TfL	Sck	Int	Yds	Avg	TD	PD	FR	Yds	TD	FF
2021	Texas	6	3	4	7	1.0	0.0	0	0	0.0	0	0	0	0	0	0
2022	Texas	13	16	28	44	9.0	5.5	0	0	0.0	0	1	0	0	0	1
2023	Texas	14	17	20	37	4.5	4.0	0	0	0.0	0	0	0	0	0	0
2024	Texas	16	16	28	44	11.0	6.0	0	0	0.0	0	1	0	0	0	0
Career		49	52	80	132	25.5	15.5	0	0	0.0	0	2	0	0	0	1
Source: sports-reference.com
