= Kelvin Banks Jr. =

American football player (born 2004)

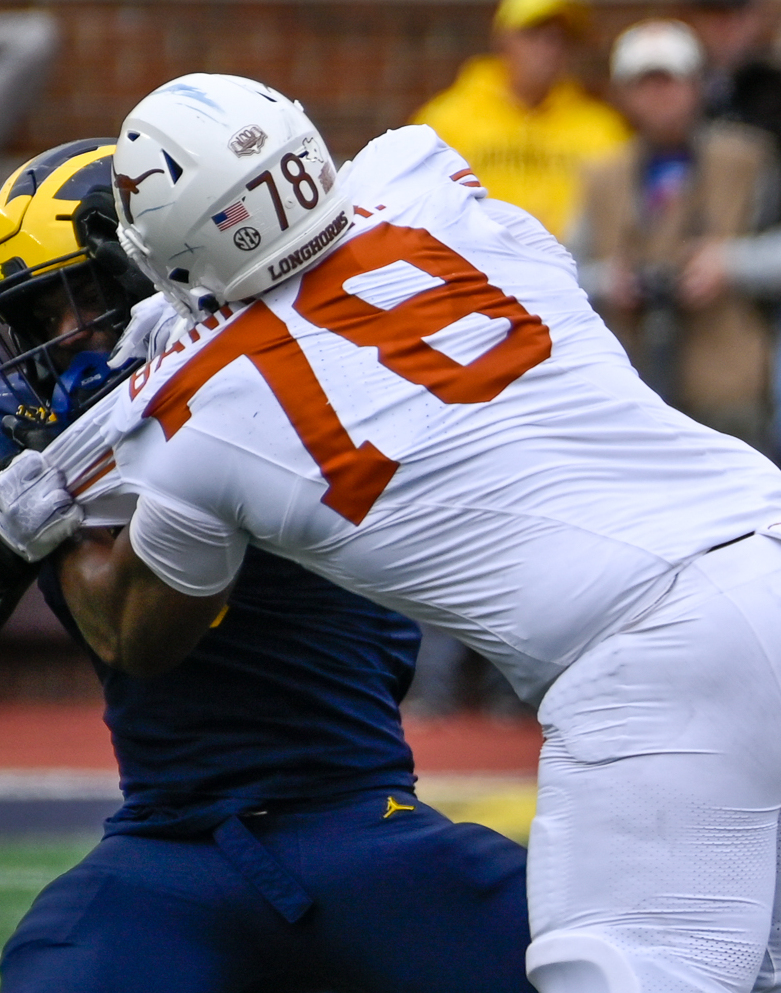
- Banks in 2024

No. 71 – New Orleans Saints
- Position: Offensive tackle
- Roster status: Active

Personal information
- Born: March 10, 2004 (age 22)
- Listed height: 6 ft 5 in (1.96 m)
- Listed weight: 315 lb (143 kg)

Career information
- High school: Summer Creek (Houston, Texas)
- College: Texas (2022–2024)
- NFL draft: 2025: 1st round, 9th overall pick

Career history
- New Orleans Saints (2025–present)

Awards and highlights
- PFWA All-Rookie Team (2025); Outland Trophy (2024); Lombardi Award (2024); Jacobs Blocking Trophy (2024); Unanimous All-American (2024); Second-team All-American (2023); First-team All-SEC (2024); First-team All-Big 12 (2023); Second-team All-Big 12 (2022)

Career NFL statistics as of Week 9, 2026
- Games played: 20
- Games started: 20
- Stats at Pro Football Reference

Kelvin Banks Jr. (born March 10, 2004) is an American professional football offensive tackle for the New Orleans Saints of the National Football League (NFL). He played college football for the Texas Longhorns, winning the Outland Trophy and Lombardi Award in 2024 prior to being selected by the Saints ninth overall in the 2025 NFL draft.

== Early life ==
Banks was born on March 10, 2004, in Humble, Texas. He attended Summer Creek High School. Banks was rated a five-star recruit and initially committed to play college football at Oregon over offers from Texas, LSU, Texas A&M, and Oklahoma State. He later decommitted after Oregon head coach Mario Cristobal left the program. Banks later signed to play at the University of Texas at Austin.

== College career ==
Banks enrolled at Texas in July 2022. He was named the Longhorns' starting left tackle entering his freshman season. Banks was named a semifinalist for the Shaun Alexander Award as a freshman in 2022 and was named a member of the All Big-12 first team in 2023. In 2024, he was named First Team All-SEC and won the Jacobs Blocking Trophy and the Lombardi Award, as the best lineman in college football that year. Banks was also awarded the Outland Trophy, which is awarded to the best interior lineman in college football.

On January 12, 2025, Banks declared for the 2025 NFL draft.

== Professional career ==
Pre-draft measurables
| Height | Weight | Arm length | Hand span | Wingspan | 40-yard dash | 10-yard split | 20-yard split | 20-yard shuttle | Three-cone drill | Vertical jump | Broad jump |
|---|---|---|---|---|---|---|---|---|---|---|---|
| 6 ft 5 1/8 in (1.96 m) | 315 lb (143 kg) | 33 1/2 in (0.85 m) | 10 3/8 in (0.26 m) | 7 ft 0 3/8 in (2.14 m) | 5.16 s | 1.79 s | 3.00 s | 4.66 s | 7.81 s | 32.0 in (0.81 m) | 8 ft 8 in (2.64 m) |
All values from NFL Combine

Banks was selected by the New Orleans Saints ninth overall in the first round of the 2025 NFL draft. He signed his four-year rookie contract worth $27.73 million fully guaranteed. Banks started all of the Saints' 17 games in his rookie season and was graded as one of the league's better left tackles despite being a rookie. In 681 pass-blocking snaps, Banks allowed just five sacks and only three accepted penalties with minimal secondary assistance. In run-blocking, Banks ranked second among all rookie linemen regardless of position per Pro Football Focus. Banks was named to the 2025 PFWA All-Rookie Team.

On September 23, 2026, Banks was placed on injured reserve due to a "severe" high–ankle sprain suffered in Week 2 against the Baltimore Ravens. He was activated on November 7, ahead of the team's Week 9 matchup against the Cleveland Browns.

== Personal life ==
In November 2024, Banks and his girlfriend announced that they were expecting their first child together.
