= Cameron Williams (American football) =

American football player (born 2003)

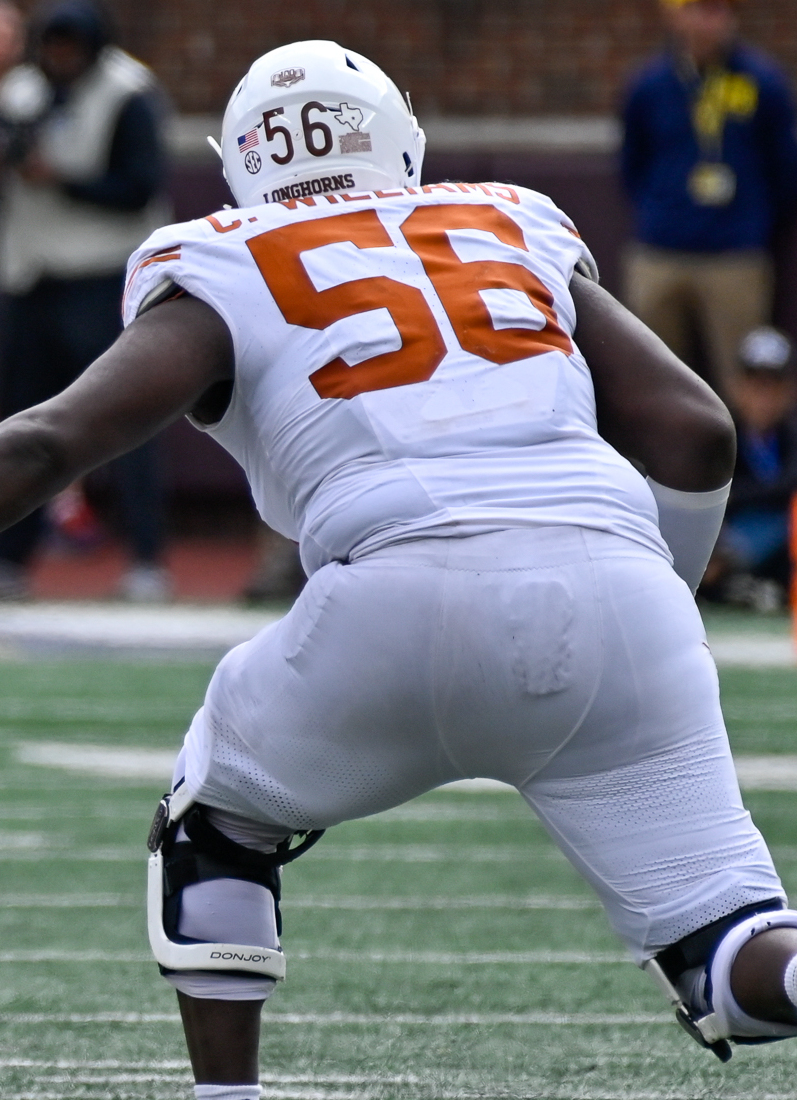
- Williams with the Texas Longhorns in 2024

No. 73 – Atlanta Falcons
- Position: Offensive tackle
- Roster status: Active

Personal information
- Born: October 16, 2003 (age 23); Duncanville, Texas, U.S.
- Listed height: 6 ft 5 in (1.96 m)
- Listed weight: 317 lb (144 kg)

Career information
- High school: Duncanville (TX)
- College: Texas (2022–2024)
- NFL draft: 2025: 6th round, 207th overall pick

Career history
- Philadelphia Eagles (2025); Atlanta Falcons (2026–present)

Career NFL statistics as of 2026
- Games played: 1
- Stats at Pro Football Reference

Cameron Williams (born October 16, 2003) is an American professional football offensive tackle for the Atlanta Falcons of the National Football League (NFL). He played college football for the Texas Longhorns and was selected by the Philadelphia Eagles in the sixth round of the 2025 NFL draft.

== Early life ==
Williams attended Duncanville High School in Duncanville, Texas. A three star recruit, he originally committed to play college football at the University of Oregon before changing his commitment to the University of Texas at Austin.

== College career ==
Over his first two years at Texas in 2022 and 2023, Williams played in 22 games and made one start. As a junior in 2024, he took over as the starting right tackle. On January 14, 2025, Williams declared for the 2025 NFL draft.

== Professional career ==
Pre-draft measurables
Height	Weight	Arm length	Hand span	Wingspan
6 ft 5 3/4 in (1.97 m)	317 lb (144 kg)	34 1/2 in (0.88 m)	11 3/8 in (0.29 m)	7 ft 0 1/2 in (2.15 m)
All values from NFL Combine

=== Philadelphia Eagles ===
Williams was selected by the Philadelphia Eagles with the 207th overall pick in the sixth round of the 2025 NFL draft. Williams signed his four-year rookie contract worth $4.40 million. He made his NFL debut in Week 18 of the 2025 season against the Washington Commanders, having missed the entirety of the season prior to that point because of a shoulder injury.

On August 30, 2026, Williams was waived by the Eagles as a part of final roster cuts.

=== Atlanta Falcons ===
On August 31, 2026, Williams was claimed off of waivers by the Atlanta Falcons. On September 12, he was placed on injured reserve due to an ankle injury. On November 11, Williams was activated off of injured reserve.
