= Jake Majors =

American football player (born 2002)

No. 75 – Philadelphia Eagles
- Position: Center
- Roster status: Active

Personal information
- Born: January 17, 2002 (age 24); Prosper, Texas, U.S.
- Listed height: 6 ft 3 in (1.91 m)
- Listed weight: 306 lb (139 kg)

Career information
- High school: Prosper (TX)
- College: Texas (2020–2024)
- NFL draft: 2025: undrafted

Career history
- Tampa Bay Buccaneers (2025)*; Philadelphia Eagles (2025–present)
- * Offseason or practice squad member only

Career NFL statistics as of Week 5, 2026
- Games played: 2
- Games started: 2
- Stats at Pro Football Reference

Jakob "Jake" Majors (born January 17, 2002) is an American professional football center for the Philadelphia Eagles of the National Football League (NFL). He played college football for the Texas Longhorns.

== Early life ==
Coming out of high school, Majors was rated as a four-star recruit, the 10th best interior offensive lineman, 38th prospect in Texas, and the 259th overall prospect in the class of 2020. He committed to play college football for the Texas Longhorns.

== College career ==
As a freshman in 2020, Majors played three games, making two starts. He chose to redshirt that year, maintaining his eligibility. Over the 2021 and 2022 seasons, he started all 25 games for the Longhorns. In 2023, Majors started all 14 games for the Longhorns. For his performance in the 2023 season, Majors was named a Big 12 Conference honorable mention selection and was also a part of a Texas offensive line which was a semifinalist for the Joe Moore Award. At the end of the season, Majors chose to return in for a 5th season. In 2024, Majors reached a total of 56 career starts, breaking the program record. At the end of the season, he declared for the NFL draft.

== Professional career ==
Pre-draft measurables
Height	Weight	Arm length	Hand span	Wingspan	40-yard dash	10-yard split	20-yard split	20-yard shuttle	Three-cone drill	Vertical jump	Broad jump	Bench press
6 ft 3 3/8 in (1.91 m)	306 lb (139 kg)	30 3/8 in (0.77 m)	9 7/8 in (0.25 m)	6 ft 4 in (1.93 m)	5.23 s	1.80 s	2.97 s	4.62 s	7.72 s	26.5 in (0.67 m)	8 ft 8 in (2.64 m)	25 reps
All values from NFL Combine/Pro Day

=== Tampa Bay Buccaneers ===
On May 9, 2025, Majors signed with the Tampa Bay Buccaneers as an undrafted free agent after going unselected in the 2025 NFL draft. He signed a three-year contract worth $2.97 million. Majors was waived with an injury designation on August 25 due to a wrist injury.

=== Philadelphia Eagles ===
On September 9, 2025, Majors was signed to the Philadelphia Eagles' practice squad. On January 12, 2026, he signed a reserve/future contract with Philadelphia.

On August 30, 2026, Majors was waived by Philadelphia as a part of final roster cuts; he was re-signed to the practice squad the following day. On October 9, he was signed to the active roster. Majors made his NFL debut and first start in Week 5 against the Jacksonville Jaguars.

== Personal life ==
Majors is a Christian. He graduated from the University of Texas at Austin with a bachelor’s in business management from the McCombs School of Business with a 3.65 GPA. His parents are Brent and Traci Majors, who are both nurses. He also has two older siblings, Matt and Maci.
