= Jerrick Gibson =

American football player

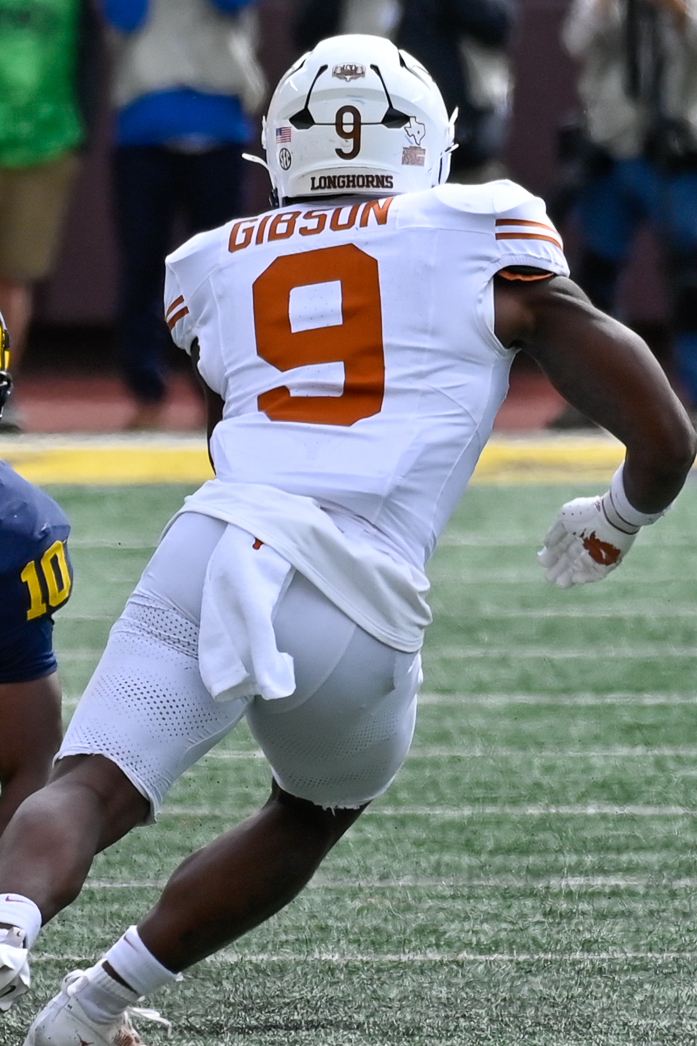
- Gibson with the Texas Longhorns in 2024

No. 4 – Purdue Boilermakers
- Position: Running back
- Class: Redshirt Sophomore

Personal information
- Listed height: 5 ft 10 in (1.78 m)
- Listed weight: 215 lb (98 kg)

Career information
- High school: IMG Academy (Bradenton, Florida)
- College: Texas (2024–2025); Purdue (2026–present)
- Stats at ESPN

Jerrick Gibson is an American college football running back for the Purdue Boilermakers. He previously played for the Texas Longhorns.

== Early life ==
Gibson attended Gainesville High School in Gainesville, Florida as a freshman, Mundy's Mill High School in Jonesboro, Georgia as a sophomore and IMG Academy in Bradenton, Florida his junior and senior years. He rushed for 608 yards with eight touchdowns as a junior and 740 yards and eight touchdowns as a senior. Gibson was selected to play in the 2024 Polynesian Bowl and 2024 All-American Bowl. He was a four-star recruit. He committed to the University of Texas at Austin to play college football.

== College career ==
=== Texas ===
Gibson earned immediate playing time his true freshman year at Texas in 2024. In his first career game he rushed for 67 yards on 10 carries with one touchdown. He appeared in 15 games and ended the season with 377 yards and four touchdowns.

In his sophomore year, Gibson appeared in 3 games. Due to injuries to both Baxter and Wisner, Gibson saw his playing time increase for the last three non-conference games. In Week 4 against Sam Houston, Gibson scored his first touchdown of the season.

On October 14, 2025, it was announced that Gibson had left the team, a few days after the Longhorn's win against Oklahoma.

=== Purdue ===
On January 4, 2026, Gibson transferred to Purdue University.

=== College statistics ===
| Year | Team | GP | Rushing | | | | Receiving | | | |
| Year | Team | GP | Att | Yards | Avg | TD | Rec | Yards | Avg | TD |
|---|---|---|---|---|---|---|---|---|---|---|
| 2024 | Texas | 15 | 78 | 377 | 4.8 | 4 | 3 | 25 | 8.3 | 0 |
| 2025 | Texas | 5 | 37 | 152 | 4.1 | 1 | 0 | 0 | 0.0 | 0 |
| 2026 | Purdue | 6 | 18 | 58 | 3.2 | 0 | 2 | 14 | 7.0 | 0 |
| Career | | 26 | 133 | 587 | 4.4 | 5 | 5 | 39 | 7.8 | 0 |
