= CJ Baxter =

American football player (born 2005)

No. 1 – Kentucky Wildcats
- Position: Running back
- Class: Redshirt Junior

Personal information
- Born: June 28, 2005 (age 21); Boynton Beach, Florida, U.S.
- Listed height: 6 ft 1 in (1.85 m)
- Listed weight: 227 lb (103 kg)

Career information
- High school: Edgewater (Orlando, Florida)
- College: Texas (2023–2025); Kentucky (2026–present)
- Stats at ESPN

Cedric "CJ" Baxter Jr. (born June 28, 2005) is an American college football running back for the Kentucky Wildcats. He previously played for the Texas Longhorns.

== Early life ==
Baxter was born on June 28, 2005, in Boytnon Beach, Florida. Baxter attended Edgewater High School in Orlando, Florida. During his high school career, he had 3,826 rushing yards and 57 touchdowns. Baxter played in the 2023 Under Armour All-America Game. A five-star recruit, he committed to the University of Texas at Austin to play college football.

== College career ==
=== Texas ===
Baxter entered his true freshman year at Texas in 2023 as the starting running back, becoming the first true freshman since Ricky Williams in 1995 to start the opener. He started the first two games of the season before missing the next two games due to a foot injury, which allowed Jonathon Brooks to take over as the starter. After Brooks suffered a season ending torn ACL, Baxter reclaimed the starting job. Overall, he played in 12 games with six starts and had 659 yards on 138 carries with five touchdowns.

Before Week 1 of the 2024 season started, Baxter suffered a knee injury during practice that required season-ending surgery. Because Baxter was projected to be the starting running back, this allowed Jaydon Blue and Quintrevion Wisner to playing a larger role.

In 2025, Baxter returned for his redshirt sophomore season. Prior to the season, he was named to the Doak Walker Award, Comeback Player of the Year Award, and Earl Campbell Tyler Rose Award watchlists. In his first game back, Baxter logged 40 rushing yards and 25 receiving yards in the loss against Ohio State. In Week 3, Baxter suffered a hamstring injury against UTEP and was ruled out for the next two weeks. He ended the season with 196 rushing yards, 41 receiving yards, and one receiving touchdown in eight games.

On December 8, 2025, Baxter entered the NCAA transfer portal.

=== Kentucky ===
On January 11, 2026, Baxter committed to the University of Kentucky.

=== College statistics ===
Year	Team	Games		Rushing				Receiving			
Year	Team	GP	GS	Att	Yards	Avg	TD	Rec	Yards	Avg	TD
2023	Texas	13	6	138	659	4.8	5	24	156	6.5	0
2024	Texas	1	0	0	0	0.0	0	0	0	0.0	0
2025	Texas	8	2	54	196	3.6	0	12	41	3.4	1
Career		22	9	192	855	4.5	5	36	197	5.5	1
