= 2023 Texas Longhorns football team =

American college football season

2023 Texas Longhorns football

Big 12 champion

Big 12 Championship, W 49–21 vs. Oklahoma State

Sugar Bowl (CFP Semifinal), L 31–37 vs. Washington
- Conference: Big 12 Conference

Ranking
- Coaches: No. 4
- AP: No. 3
- Record: 12–2 (8–1 Big 12)
- Head coach: Steve Sarkisian (3rd season)
- Offensive coordinator: Kyle Flood (3rd season)
- Co-offensive coordinator: A. J. Milwee (3rd season)
- Offensive scheme: Spread
- Defensive coordinator: Pete Kwiatkowski (3rd season)
- Co-defensive coordinator: Jeff Choate (3rd season)
- Base defense: 4–2–5
- Home stadium: Darrell K Royal–Texas Memorial Stadium

Uniform
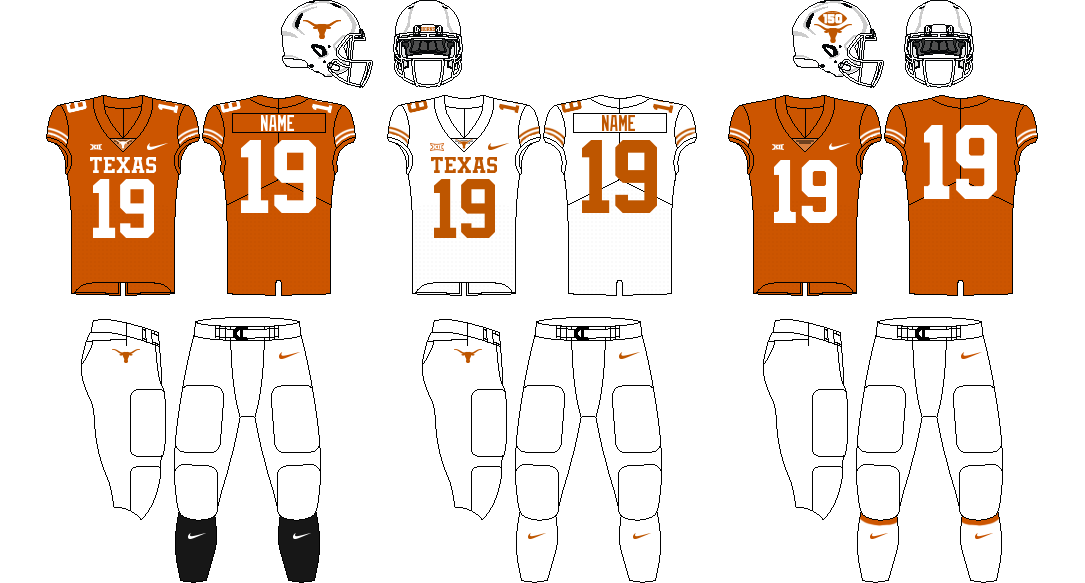

2023 Big 12 Conference football standings
	Conf.			Overall
Team	W		L	W		L
No. 3 Texas y$^	8	–	1	12	–	2
No. 16 Oklahoma State y	7	–	2	10	–	4
No. 15 Oklahoma	7	–	2	10	–	3
Iowa State	6	–	3	7	–	6
No. 18 Kansas State	6	–	3	9	–	4
West Virginia	6	–	3	9	–	4
Texas Tech	5	–	4	7	–	6
No. 23 Kansas	5	–	4	9	–	4
UCF	3	–	6	6	–	7
TCU	3	–	6	5	–	7
Houston	2	–	7	4	–	8
BYU	2	–	7	5	–	7
Baylor	2	–	7	3	–	9
Cincinnati	1	–	8	3	–	9
Championship: Texas 49, Oklahoma State 21
^ – College Football Playoff participant; $ – Conference champion; y – Championship game participant; Rankings from AP Poll

The 2023 Texas Longhorns football team represented the University of Texas at Austin as a member of the Big 12 Conference during the 2023 NCAA Division I FBS football season. They were led by third-year head coach Steve Sarkisian. The Longhorns played their home games at Darrell K Royal–Texas Memorial Stadium in Austin, Texas.

The season marked the team's last season as members of the Big 12 Conference before joining the Southeastern Conference on July 1, 2024.

== Offseason ==
Positions key
Offense	Defense	Special teams
QB — Quarterback; RB — Running back; FB — Fullback; WR — Wide receiver; TE — Tight end; OL — Offensive lineman; T — Tackle; G — Guard; C — Center	DL — Defensive lineman; DT — Defensive tackle (Note: Includes nose tackle (NT)); DE — Defensive end; EDGE — Edge rusher; LB — Linebacker (Note: Includes middle linebacker (MLB/MIKE), weakside linebacker (WILL), strongside linebacker (SAM), off-ball linebacker, and outside linebacker (OLB)); DB — Defensive back; CB — Cornerback; S — Safety (Note: Includes free safety (FS) and strong safety (SS))	K — Kicker (Note: Also known as a placekicker (PK)); P — Punter; LS — Long snapper; RS — Return specialist (Note: Includes kickoff and punt returners)

=== Departures ===
==== Team departures ====
2023 Texas Offseason departures
Name	Number	Pos.	Height	Weight	Year	Hometown	Notes
Anthony Cook	11	CB	6’1”	195 lbs	Senior	Houston, TX	Graduated
Bijan Robinson	5	RB	6'0”	222 lbs	Junior	Tucson, AZ	Declared for 2023 NFL draft
Brayden Liebrock	89	TE	6’4”	228 lbs	Junior	Chandler, AZ	Retired
Chris Hannon	52	EDGE	6’2”	219 lbs	Senior	Houston, TX	Graduated
Daniel Trejo	35	P	6’2”	195 lbs	Senior	Fort Worth, TX	Graduated
DeMarvion Overshown	0	LB	6’4”	220 lbs	Senior	Arp, TX	Graduated
Diamonte Tucker-Dorsey	3	LB	5’10”	219 lbs	Senior	Norfolk, VA	Graduated
D'Shawn Jamison	5		5’10”	187 lbs	Senior	Houston, TX	Graduated
Gabe Sulser	83	WR	5’9”	163 lbs	Senior	Billings, MT	Graduated
Keondre Coburn	99	DT	6’2”	344 lbs	Senior	Houston, TX	Graduated
Luke Brockermeyer	47	LB	6’3”	224 lbs	Senior	Fort Worth, TX	Graduated
Michael Balis	64	OL	6’5”	275 lbs	Senior	Plano, TX	Graduated
Moro Ojomo	98	DT	6’3”	284 lbs	Senior	Katy, TX	Graduated
Parker Alford	87	WR	5’10”	176 lbs	Senior	Dripping Springs, TX	Graduated
Roschon Johnson	2	RB	6’2”	222 lbs	Senior	Port Arthur, TX	Graduated
Tarique Milton	16	WR	5’10”	192 lbs	Senior	Bradenton, FL	Graduated
Zach Edwards	29	DS	5’11”	212 lbs	Senior	Azle, TX	Graduated

==== Outgoing transfers ====
Name	No.	Pos.	Height	Weight	Hometown	Year	New school	Source
Agiye Hall	15	WR	6'3”	196 lbs	Valrico, FL	Sophomore	—	
Andrej Karic	69	OL	6’5”	306 lbs	Southlake, TX	Sophomore	Tennessee	
Ben Ballard	16	QB	5’11”	203 lbs	Austin, TX	Senior	FAU	
Brenen Thompson	11	WR	5’10”	163 lbs	Spearman, TX	Freshman	Oklahoma	
D.J. Harris Jr.	42	EDGE	6’2”	235 lbs	New Caney, TX	Redshirt Freshman	USF	
Devin Richardson	30	LB	6’3”	234 lbs	Klein, TX	Senior	Washington State	
Hudson Card	1	QB	6’2”	201 lbs	Austin, TX	Sophomore	Purdue	
Isaac Pearson	49	P	6’2”	223 lbs	Newcastle, AUS	Redshirt Freshman	SMU	
Ishmael Ibraheem	19	DB	6’2”	169 lbs	Dallas, TX	Redshirt Freshman	Marshall	
Jaden Alexis	13	WR	6’0”	186 lbs	Pompano Beach, FL	Redshirt Freshman	USF	
Jamier Johnson	31	DB	6’0”	175 lbs	Pasadena, CA	Sophomore	Indiana	
JD Coffey III	27	DB	6’0”	189 lbs	Kennedale, TX	Sophomore	San Diego State	
Junior Angilau	75	OL	6’6”	311 lbs	Salt Lake City, UT	Senior	Oregon	
Logan Parr	71	OL	6’4”	314 lbs	Helotes, TX	Sophomore	SMU	
Ovie Oghoufo	18	EDGE	6’3”	239 lbs	Lathrup Village, MI	Senior	LSU	
Prince Dorbah	32	EDGE	6’3”	232 lbs	Dallas, TX	Sophomore	Arizona State	
Troy Omeire	21	WR	6’3”	213 lbs	Sugar Land, TX	Sophomore	Arizona State	
Zach Edwards	29	DS	5'11”	212 lbs	Azle, TX	Senior	—	

Note: Players with a dash in the new school column didn't land on a new team for the 2023 season.

==== Coaching staff departures ====
Name	Position	New Team	New Position	Source
Brennan Marion	Wide Receivers Coach/passing game coordinator	UNLV	Offensive Coordinator	
Ray Pickering	Offensive Analyst	Norfolk State	Offensive coordinator/quarterbacks coach	

=== Acquisitions ===
==== Incoming transfers ====
Name	Pos.	Height/Weight	Hometown	Year	Prev school	Source
Gavin Holmes	DB	5'11", 175 lbs	New Orleans, LA	Sophomore	Wake Forest	
Jalen Catalon	DB	5'10", 201 lbs	Mansfield, TX	(redshirt) Junior	Arkansas	
Ryan Sanborn	P	6'3", 207 lbs	San Diego, CA	Senior	Stanford	
Adonai Mitchell	WR	6'4", 190 lbs	Missouri City, TX	Sophomore	Georgia	
DeAngelo "Trill" Carter	DT	6'2", 300 lbs	Leesburg, GA	Graduate Student	Minnesota	

==== 2023 recruits ====
College recruiting
Name	Hometown	School	Height	Weight	Commit date
Arch Manning; QB	New Orleans, LA	Isidore Newman School	6 ft 4 in (1.93 m)	215 lb (98 kg)	Jun 23, 2022
Arch Manning; QB	Recruit ratings: Rivals: 247Sports: ESPN: (93)				
Anthony Hill; LB	Denton, TX	Billy Ryan High School	6 ft 2 in (1.88 m)	225 lb (102 kg)	Dec 15, 2022
Anthony Hill; LB	Recruit ratings: Rivals: 247Sports: ESPN: (90)				
Johntay Cook II; WR	DeSoto, TX	DeSoto High School	6 ft 0 in (1.83 m)	175 lb (79 kg)	Jun 29, 2022
Johntay Cook II; WR	Recruit ratings: Rivals: 247Sports: ESPN: (86)				
Cedric Baxter Jr. RB	Orlando, FL	Edgewater High School	6 ft 1 in (1.85 m)	215 lb (98 kg)	Aug 10, 2022
Cedric Baxter Jr. RB	Recruit ratings: Rivals: 247Sports: ESPN: (86)				
Derek Williams; S	New Iberia, LA	Westgate High School	6 ft 2 in (1.88 m)	185 lb (84 kg)	Jun 27, 2022
Derek Williams; S	Recruit ratings: Rivals: 247Sports: ESPN: (86)				
Malik Muhammad; CB	Dallas, TX	South Oak Cliff High School	5 ft 11.5 in (1.82 m)	175 lb (79 kg)	Jul 20, 2022
Malik Muhammad; CB	Recruit ratings: Rivals: 247Sports: ESPN: (86)				
Sydir Mitchell; DL	Oradell, NJ	Bergen Catholic High School	6 ft 5 in (1.96 m)	335 lb (152 kg)	Jul 3, 2022
Sydir Mitchell; DL	Recruit ratings: Rivals: 247Sports: ESPN: (86)				
DeAndre Moore Jr. WR	Bellflower, CA	St. John Bosco High School	6 ft 00 in (1.83 m)	185 lb (84 kg)	Dec 22, 2022
DeAndre Moore Jr. WR	Recruit ratings: Rivals: 247Sports: ESPN: (85)				
Ryan Niblett; WR	Houston, TX	Eisenhower High School	5 ft 10 in (1.78 m)	170 lb (77 kg)	Apr 23, 2022
Ryan Niblett; WR	Recruit ratings: Rivals: 247Sports: ESPN: (84)				
Tausili Akana; EDGE	Lehi, UT	Skyridge High School	6 ft 4 in (1.93 m)	225 lb (102 kg)	Dec 21, 2022
Tausili Akana; EDGE	Recruit ratings: Rivals: 247Sports: ESPN: (84)				
Derion Gullette; LB	Teague, TX	Teague High School	6 ft 2 in (1.88 m)	220 lb (100 kg)	Aug 5, 2022
Derion Gullette; LB	Recruit ratings: Rivals: 247Sports: ESPN: (83)				
Colton Vasek; EDGE	Austin, TX	Westlake High School	6 ft 5.5 in (1.97 m)	225 lb (102 kg)	Nov 8, 2022
Colton Vasek; EDGE	Recruit ratings: Rivals: 247Sports: ESPN: (82)				
S'Maje Burrell; LB	Fort Worth, TX	North Crowley High School	6 ft 0 in (1.83 m)	215 lb (98 kg)	Apr 2, 2022
S'Maje Burrell; LB	Recruit ratings: Rivals: 247Sports: ESPN: (81)				
Jelani McDonald; ATH	Waco, TX	Connally High School	6 ft 2 in (1.88 m)	197 lb (89 kg)	Jan 7, 2023
Jelani McDonald; ATH	Recruit ratings: Rivals: 247Sports: ESPN: (81)				
Warren Roberson; DB	Red Oak, TX	Red Oak High School	6 ft 0 in (1.83 m)	180 lb (82 kg)	Feb 7, 2023
Warren Roberson; DB	Recruit ratings: Rivals: 247Sports: ESPN: (80)				
Payton Kirkland; OT	Orlando, FL	Dr. Phillips High School	6 ft 6 in (1.98 m)	345 lb (156 kg)	Jul 23, 2022
Payton Kirkland; OT	Recruit ratings: Rivals: 247Sports: ESPN: (80)				
Tre Wisner; RB	DeSoto, TX	DeSoto High School	5 ft 11 in (1.80 m)	180 lb (82 kg)	Apr 23, 2022
Tre Wisner; RB	Recruit ratings: Rivals: 247Sports: ESPN: (80)				
Connor Stroh; OT	Frisco, TX	Wakeland High School	6 ft 6.5 in (1.99 m)	345 lb (156 kg)	Jun 26, 2022
Connor Stroh; OT	Recruit ratings: Rivals: 247Sports: ESPN: (80)				
Jaydon Chatman; IOL	Harker Heights, TX	Harker Heights High School	6 ft 4 in (1.93 m)	300 lb (140 kg)	Jun 26, 2022
Jaydon Chatman; IOL	Recruit ratings: Rivals: 247Sports: ESPN: (80)				
Liona Lefau; LB	Kahuku, HI	Kahuku High School	6 ft 1 in (1.85 m)	210 lb (95 kg)	Jun 25, 2022
Liona Lefau; LB	Recruit ratings: Rivals: 247Sports: ESPN: (79)				
Spencer Shannon; TE	Santa Ana, CA	Mater Dei High School	6 ft 7 in (2.01 m)	240 lb (110 kg)	Jun 13, 2022
Spencer Shannon; TE	Recruit ratings: Rivals: 247Sports: ESPN: (78)				
Andre Cojoe; IOL	Arlington, TX	Mansfield Timberview High School	6 ft 6 in (1.98 m)	330 lb (150 kg)	Jun 26, 2022
Andre Cojoe; IOL	Recruit ratings: Rivals: 247Sports: ESPN: (78)				
Billy Walton; EDGE	Dallas, TX	South Oak Cliff High School	6 ft 2.5 in (1.89 m)	215 lb (98 kg)	Jun 28, 2022
Billy Walton; EDGE	Recruit ratings: Rivals: 247Sports: ESPN: (78)				
Will Randle; TE	New Orleans, LA	Isidore Newman School	6 ft 3 in (1.91 m)	220 lb (100 kg)	Jun 19, 2022
Will Randle; TE	Recruit ratings: Rivals: 247Sports: ESPN: (77)				
Trevor Goosby; OT	Melissa, TX	Melissa High School	6 ft 6 in (1.98 m)	280 lb (130 kg)	Jun 26, 2022
Trevor Goosby; OT	Recruit ratings: Rivals: 247Sports: ESPN: (77)				
Overall recruit ranking: Rivals: 3 247Sports: 5
Note: In many cases, Scout, Rivals, 247Sports, On3, and ESPN may conflict in their listings of height and weight.; In these cases, the average was taken. ESPN grades are on a 100-point scale.; Sources: "Rivals commits". Rivals.; "ESPN commits". ESPN.; "2023 Team Ranking". Rivals.com.; "247Sports commits". 247Sports.

==== 2023 overall class ranking ====
Website	National rank	Conference rank	5 star recruits	4 star recruits	3 star recruits	2 star recruits	1 star recruits	No star ranking
On3 Recruits	#3	#1	3	13	9	0	0	0
Rivals	#3	#1	2	15	8	0	0	0
247 Sports	#3	#1	4	16	8	0	0	0
ESPN	—	—	2	16	7	0	0	0

==== Walk-ons ====
Name	Pos.	Height	Weight	Hometown	High school
Brady Sarkisian	LB	6’1”	230 lbs	Newport Beach, CA	Corona del Mar High School
Brooks Kieschnick Jr.	OL	6’3”	242 lbs	San Antonio, TX	Alamo Heights High School
Bryce Chambers	WR	6’1”	203 lbs	Austin, TX	Westlake High School
Dorian Black	DL	5'10”	270 lbs	Harker Heights, TX	Harker Heights High School
Ian Ratliff	P	5'11”	177 lbs	Humble, TX	Atascocita High School
Ja’Faar Johnson Jr.	DB	5'11”	186 lbs	Bastrop, TX	Cedar Creek High School
Reed Malphurs	K	6'6”	194 lbs	Dallas, TX	Hillcrest High School
Rett Andersen	WR	5'11”	188 lbs	San Antonio, TX	Alamo Heights High School
Robert Sweeney	OL	6'5”	269 lbs	Dallas, TX	Highland Park High School
Tate Harver	DS	6'0”	226 lbs	Westlake Village, CA	Oaks Christian High School
Ty Boatright	WR	6'0”	178 lbs	Kingwood, TX	Kingwood High School

==== Coaching staff additions ====
Name	New Position	Previous Team	Previous Position	Source
Chris Jackson	Wide receivers coach	Jacksonville Jaguars	Wide receivers coach	
Joe DeCamillis	Special assistant to the head coach	Los Angeles Rams	Special teams coordinator	
Paul Chryst	Offensive analyst	Wisconsin Badgers	Head coach	

=== Entered 2023 NFL draft ===
Round	Position
Bijan Robinson	RB

=== Returning starters ===
The Longhorns return 18 starters from the previous season. They return 9 on offense, 6 on defense, and 3 on special teams.

Offense
Player	Class	Position
Quinn Ewers	Sophomore	QB
Xavier Worthy	Junior	WR
Jordan Whittington	Senior	WR
Ja'Tavion Sanders	Junior	TE
Jake Majors	Junior	OL
Hayden Conner	Junior	OL
Kelvin Banks	Sophomore	OL
Cole Hutson	Sophomore	OL
Christian Jones	Senior	OL

Defense
Player	Class	Position
T'Vondre Sweat	Senior	DL
Barryn Sorrell	Junior	EDGE
Jaylan Ford	Senior	LB
Jahdae Barron	Senior	DB
Jerrin Thompson	Senior	DB
Ryan Watts	Senior	DB

Special teams
Player	Class	Position
Bert Auburn	Sophomore	K
Will Stone	Sophomore	K
Lance St. Louis	Sophomore	DS

== Preseason ==
Big 12 media poll
Predicted finish	Team	Votes (1st place)
1	Texas	886 (41)
2	Kansas State	858 (14)
3	Oklahoma	758 (4)
4	Texas Tech	729 (4)
5	TCU	727 (3)
6	Baylor	572
7	Oklahoma State	470 (1)
8	UCF	463
9	Kansas	461
10	Iowa State	334
11	BYU	318
12	Houston	215
13	Cincinnati	202
14	West Virginia	129

=== Award watch lists ===
Listed in the order that they were released

Award	Player	Position	Year	Source
Lott IMPACT Trophy	Jaylan Ford	LB	Senior	
Maxwell Award	Xavier Worthy	WR	Junior	
Maxwell Award	Quinn Ewers	QB	Sophomore	
Outland Trophy	Kelvin Banks Jr.	OL	Sophomore	
Bronko Nagurski Trophy	Jaylan Ford	LB	Senior	
Ray Guy Award	Ryan Sanborn	P	Senior	
Lou Groza Award	Bert Auburn	K	Junior	
Wuerffel Trophy	Christian Jones	OL	Senior	
Paul Hornung Award	Xavier Worthy	WR	Junior	
John Mackey Award	Ja'Tavion Sanders	TE	Junior	
Rimington Award	Jake Majors	OL	Junior	
Biletnikoff Award	Xavier Worthy	WR	Junior	
Davey O’Brien Award	Quinn Ewers	QB	Sophomore	
Butkus Award	Jaylan Ford	LB	Senior	
Walter Camp Player of the Year Award	Xavier Worthy	WR	Junior	
Walter Camp Player of the Year Award	Quinn Ewers	QB	Sophomore	
Bednarik Award	Jaylan Ford	LB	Senior	
Manning Award	Quinn Ewers	QB	Sophomore	
Lombardi Award	Jaylan Ford	LB	Senior	
Lombardi Award	Ja'Tavion Sanders	TE	Junior	
Lombardi Award	Kelvin Banks Jr.	OL	Sophomore	
Earl Campbell Tyler Rose Award	Xavier Worthy	WR	Junior	
Earl Campbell Tyler Rose Award	Quinn Ewers	QB	Sophomore	
Johnny Unitas Golden Arm Award	Quinn Ewers	QB	Sophomore	
Shaun Alexander Freshman of the Year Award	CJ Baxter	RB	Freshman	
Shaun Alexander Freshman of the Year Award	Johntay Cook	WR	Freshman	
Shaun Alexander Freshman of the Year Award	Anthony Hill Jr.	LB	Freshman	
Shaun Alexander Freshman of the Year Award	Malik Muhammad	DB	Freshman	

=== Preseason Big-12 awards ===
Big 12 Defensive Player of the Year
Player	No.	Position	Class	Source
Jaylan Ford	41	LB	Senior	

2023 Preseason All-Big 12 teams
Position	Player	Class
Offense
WR	Xavier Worthy	Junior
TE	Ja'Tavion Sanders	Junior
OL	Kelvin Banks Jr.	Sophomore
Defense
DL	Byron Murphy II	Junior
LB	Jaylan Ford	Senior

=== Preseason All-Americans ===
Second Team All-Americans
Player	No.	Position	Class	Selector(s)	Source(s)
Jaylan Ford	41	LB	Senior	Sporting News	
Xavier Worthy	1	WR	Junior	AP	
Kelvin Banks Jr.	78	OL	Sophomore	AP	

== Schedule ==
Date	Time	Opponent	Rank	Site	TV	Result	Attendance
September 2	2:30 p.m.	Rice*	No. 11	Darrell K Royal–Texas Memorial Stadium; Austin, TX (rivalry)	FOX	W 37–10	98,017
September 9	6:00 p.m.	at No. 3 Alabama*	No. 11	Bryant–Denny Stadium; Tuscaloosa, AL (Allstate Crossbar Classic, College GameDay, SEC Nation)	ESPN	W 34–24	100,077
September 16	7:00 p.m.	Wyoming*	No. 4	Darrell K Royal–Texas Memorial Stadium; Austin, TX	LHN	W 31–10	101,777 (Note: 101,777 is the 8th highest attendance for a game at Darrell K Royal–Texas Memorial Stadium to date, later dropped to 9th after September 30 vs Kansas and to 10th after November 4 vs Kansas State and to 11th after November 24 vs Texas Tech)
September 23	6:30 p.m.	at Baylor	No. 3	McLane Stadium; Waco, TX (rivalry)	ABC	W 38–6	49,165 (Note: 49,165 is the 3rd highest attendance for a game at McLane Stadium to date)
September 30	2:30 p.m.	No. 21 Kansas	No. 3	Darrell K Royal–Texas Memorial Stadium; Austin, TX	ABC	W 40–14	102,986 (Note: 102,986 is the 4th highest attendance for a game at Darrell K Royal–Texas Memorial Stadium to date)
October 7	11:00 a.m.	vs. No. 12 Oklahoma	No. 3	Cotton Bowl Stadium; Dallas, TX (Red River Showdown, College GameDay)	ABC	L 30–34	92,100
October 21	3:00 p.m.	at Houston	No. 8	TDECU Stadium; Houston, TX	FOX	W 31–24	42,812 (Note: 42,812 is the 2nd highest attendance for a game at TDECU Stadium to date)
October 28	2:30 p.m.	BYU	No. 7	Darrell K Royal–Texas Memorial Stadium; Austin, TX	ABC	W 35–6	101,670 (Note: 101,670 is the 10th highest attendance for a game at Darrell K Royal–Texas Memorial Stadium to date, later dropped to 11th after November 4 vs Kansas State and to 12th after November 24 vs Texas Tech)
November 4	11:00 a.m.	No. 24 Kansas State	No. 7	Darrell K Royal–Texas Memorial Stadium; Austin, TX (Big Noon Kickoff)	FOX	W 33–30 ^{OT}	102,846 (Note: 102,846 is the 5th highest attendance for a game at Darrell K Royal–Texas Memorial Stadium to date)
November 11	6:30 p.m.	at TCU	No. 7	Amon G. Carter Stadium; Fort Worth, TX (rivalry)	ABC	W 29–26	50,812 (Note: 50,812 is the 3rd highest attendance for a game at Amon G. Carter Stadium to date)
November 18	7:00 p.m.	at Iowa State	No. 7	Jack Trice Stadium; Ames, IA	FOX	W 26–16	61,500 (Note: Reported attendance of 61,500 is considered a sellout and a Record Attendance at Jack Trice Stadium, the 15th sellout in its current configuration (since 2015))
November 24	6:30 p.m.	Texas Tech	No. 7	Darrell K Royal–Texas Memorial Stadium; Austin, TX (Battle For The Chancellor's Spurs)	ABC	W 57–7	102,452 (Note: 102,452 is the 8th highest attendance for a game at Darrell K Royal–Texas Memorial Stadium to date)
December 2	11:00 a.m.	vs. No. 19 Oklahoma State	No. 7	AT&T Stadium; Arlington, TX (Big 12 Championship Game)	ABC	W 49–21	84,523 (Note: 84,523 set the attendance record for the Big 12 Championship Game, surpassing the previous record of 83,114)
January 1, 2024	7:45 p.m.	vs. No. 2 Washington*	No. 3	Caesars Superdome; New Orleans, LA (Sugar Bowl–CFP Semifinal)	ESPN	L 31–37	68,791
*Non-conference game; Rankings from AP Poll (and CFP Rankings, after October 31) - Released prior to game; All times are in Central time; Source: Texas Sports

== Personnel ==
=== Coaching staff ===
Coach	Title	Years at Texas
Steve Sarkisian	Head Coach	3rd
Jeff Banks	AHC/TE/ST	3rd
Kyle Flood	OC/OL	3rd
A. J. Milwee	Co-OC/QB	3rd
Tashard Choice	RB	2nd
Chris Jackson	WR	1st
Pete Kwiatkowski	DC/OLB	3rd
Jeff Choate	Co-DC/ILB	3rd
Bo Davis	DL	3rd
Terry Joseph	DB	3rd
Blake Gideon	S	3rd
Torre Becton	S&C	3rd

=== Roster ===
2023 Texas Longhorns Football Roster
Quarterback: 3 – Quinn Ewers – Sophomore (6'2, 195); 6 – Maalik Murphy – (redshirt) Freshman (6'5, 238); 14 – Charles Wright – Sophomore (6'1, 203); 16 – Arch Manning – Freshman (6'4, 212); 18 – Joe Tatum – Sophomore (5'11, 180); 19 – Cole Lourd – Junior (6'2, 216); Running back: 4 – CJ Baxter – Freshman (6'1, 218); 7 – Keilan Robinson – Senior (5'9, 188); 17 – Savion Red – Sophomore (5'10, 214); 23 – Jaydon Blue – Sophomore (6'0, 191); 24 – Jonathon Brooks – Sophomore (6'0, 207); 26 – Quintrevion Wisner – Freshman (6'0, 185); 27 – Colin Page – Sophomore (5'10, 206); 29 – Ky Woods – Sophomore (5'9, 175); Wide receiver: 1 – Xavier Worthy – Junior (6'1, 172); 2 – Johntay Cook II – Freshman (6'0, 186); 5 – Adonai Mitchell – Junior (6'4, 196); 8 – Casey Cain – Sophomore (6'3, 197); 9 – Isaiah Neyor – Senior (6'3, 215); 11 – DeAndre Moore Jr. – Freshman (6'0, 194); 13 – Jordan Whittington – Senior (6'1, 204); 18 – Ryan Niblett – Freshman (5'10, 183); 35 – Rett Andersen – Freshman (5'11, 188); 36 – Quinn Merritt – Sophomore (6'1, 194); 37 – Bryce Chambers – Freshman (6'1, 203); 38 – Remy Patson – Sophomore (5'9, 172); 39 – Hamilton McMartin – Sophomore (6'0, 174); 49 – Thatcher Milton – Junior (5'10, 183); 84 – Reece Beauchamp – Sophomore (6'2, 189); 86 – Paxton Anderson – Senior (6'4, 213); 89 – Ty Boatright – Freshman (6'0, 178); Tight end: 0 – Ja'Tavion Sanders – Junior (6'4, 243); 48 – Patrick Bayouth – Senior (6'4, 281); 81 – Juan Davis – Junior (6'4, 219); 82 – Gus Asel – Senior (6'1, 226); 83 – Spencer Shannon – Freshman (6'7, 241); 85 – Gunnar Helm – Junior (6'5, 250); 87 – Will Randle – Freshman (6'4, 235); Kicker/Punter: 15 – Will Stone – Sophomore (6'0, 194) (K); 27 – Ryan Sanborn – Senior (6'3, 211) (P); 43 – Reed Malphurs – Freshman (6'6, 194) (K); 45 – Bert Auburn – Junior (6'0, 183) (K); 47 – Charlie Feris – Sophomore (6'2, 196) (K); 49 – Ian Ratliff – Freshman (5'11, 177) (P); 96 – Gabriel Lozano – (redshirt) Senior (6'1, 185) (K); Deep Snapper: 52 – Tate Haver – Freshman (6'0, 226); 57 – Christian Rizzi – Junior (5'11, 225); 58 – Lance St. Louis – Sophomore (6'0, 219)	Offensive line: 52 – DJ Campbell – Sophomore (6'3, 343); 54 – Cole Hutson – Sophomore (6'5, 318); 56 – Cameron Williams – Sophomore (6'5, 369); 61 – Sawyer Goram-Welch – Junior (6'4, 307); 62 – Connor Robertson – (redshirt) Freshman (6'4, 319); 63 – Rick McBroom – Sophomore (6'2, 305); 64 – Robert Sweeney – Freshman (6'5, 269); 65 – Jake Majors – Junior (6'3, 315); 67 – Malik Agbo – (redshirt) Freshman (6'4, 294); 68 – Brooks Kieschnick Jr. – Freshman (6'3, 242); 70 – Christian Jones – Senior (6'6, 321); 71 – Payton Kirkland – Freshman (6'6, 350); 72 – Neto Umeozulu – (redshirt) Freshman (6'4, 311); 73 – Max Merril – Sophomore (6'4, 294); 74 – Trevor Goosby – Freshman (6'7, 285); 75 – Jaydon Chatman – Freshman (6'4, 308); 76 – Hayden Conner – Junior (6'5, 320); 77 – Andre Cojoe – Freshman (6'6, 355); 78 – Kelvin Banks Jr. – Sophomore (6'4, 324); 79 – Connor Stroh – Freshman (6'7, 364); Defensive line: 42 – Ben Armstrong – Sophomore (6'3, 264); 45 – Vernon Broughton – Junior (6'4, 291); 53 – Aaron Bryant – (redshirt) Freshman (6'2, 301); 90 – Byron Murphy II – Junior (6'1, 308); 93 – T'Vondre Sweat – Senior (6'4, 362); 94 – Jaray Bledsoe – (redshirt) Freshman (6'4, 274); 95 – Alfred Collins – Senior (6'5, 317); 96 – Zac Swanson – (redshirt) Freshman (6'4, 270); 97 – Kristopher Ross – (redshirt) Freshman (6'2, 255); 98 – Trill Carter – Senior (6'2, 300); 99 – Sydir Mitchell – Freshman (6'6, 335); EDGE: 1 – Justice Finkley – Sophomore (6'2, 250); 17 – J'Mond Tapp – (redshirt) Freshman (6'3, 266); 31 – Billy Walton III – Freshman (6'3, 225); 46 – Tausili Akana – Freshman (6'4, 209); 88 – Barryn Sorrell – Junior (6'4, 261); 91 – Ethan Burke – Sophomore (6'6, 257); 92 – Colton Vasek – Freshman (6'5, 242)	Linebacker: 0 – Anthony Hill Jr. – Freshman (6'3, 234); 15 – S'Maje Burrell – Freshman (6'0, 219); 18 – Liona Lefau – Freshman (6'1, 227); 32 – Brady Sarkisian – Freshman (6'1, 240); 33 – David Gbenda – Senior (6'0, 225); 37 – Morice Blackwell Jr. – Junior (6'1, 208); 40 – Derion Gullette – Freshman (6'3, 231); 41 – Jaylan Ford – Senior (6'3, 242); 43 – Jett Bush – Senior (6'2, 242); 44 – Tannahill Love – Senior (5'11, 225); 50 – Michael Flanagan – Sophomore (6'2, 241); 51 – Marshall Landwehr – Junior (6'0, 226); 55 – Winston Smith – Sophomore (6'1, 202); Defensive back: 2 – Derek Williams Jr. – Freshman (6'2, 191); 3 – Larry Turner-Gooden – (redshirt) Freshman (6'0, 204); 4 – Austin Jordan – Sophomore (6'0, 198); 5 – Malik Muhammad – Freshman (6'0, 181); 6 – Ryan Watts – Senior (6'3, 206); 7 – B.J. Allen Jr. – (redshirt) Freshman (6'1, 205); 8 – Terrance Brooks – Sophomore (6'0, 200); 9 – Gavin Holmes – Junior (5'11, 177); 11 – Jalen Catalon – Senior (5'10, 202); 13 – Jaylon Guilbeau – Sophomore (6'0, 180); 14 – X'Avion Brice – (redshirt) Freshman (6'1, 183); 16 – Michael Taaffe – Sophomore (6'0, 189); 21 – Kitan Crawford – Senior (5'11, 200; 23 – Jahdae Barron – Senior (5'11, 192); 24 – Warren Roberson – Freshman (6'0, 193); 24 – Jelani McDonald – Freshman (6'2, 198); 28 – Jerrin Thompson – Senior (6'0, 191); 29 – Carson Marshall – Sophomore (6'0, 188); 38 – Graham Gillespie – Sophomore (6'0, 197); 39 – Ja'Faar Johnson – Sophomore (5'11, 186); Legend: (C) Team captain; (S) Suspended; (I) Ineligible; Injured; Redshirt

== Game summaries ==
=== Rice ===
Rice–Texas football rivalry

Team	1	2	3	4	Total
Rice	3	0	0	7	10
• No. 12 Texas	7	9	21	0	37

- Date: September 2, 2023
- Location: Darrell K Royal–Texas Memorial Stadium (Austin, TX)
- Game start: 2:36 pm CDT
- Elapsed time: 3:11
- Game attendance: 98,017
- Game weather: Sunny, 99 °F (37 °C)
- Referee: Tutashinda Salaam
- TV announcers (FOX): Jason Benetti, Brock Huard, and Allison Williams

The Longhorns were heavily favored by sportsbooks in their season opener against the Rice Owls, with a spread of 35.5 points (a roughly five-touchdown margin) in favor of Texas. After receiving the opening kickoff, Texas failed to convert on fourth down, resulting in a turnover on downs on their own 33-yard line that led to Rice taking a 3–0 lead following a subsequent field goal. Texas's following drive culminated in a 37-yard touchdown pass from quarterback Quinn Ewers to runningback Jonathon Brooks. Brooks later dropped a potential touchdown pass in the second quarter, forcing to Texas to settle for a field goal. Texas kicker Bert Auburn successfully kicked three field goals in the second quarter, including one to close out the first half, while Texas defense held Rice scoreless in the quarter, intercepting the Owls twice. The Longhorns entered halftime with a 16–3 lead. The first half of the matchup was closer than anticipated despite the lead, with the Owls defense registering two sacks and forcing a pair of turnovers on downs in the half, stymieing the Longhorns offense.

Texas widened their lead in the third quarter, with quarterback Ewers scoring two passing touchdowns and one rushing touchdowns to give Texas a 37–3 lead by the end of the quarter. Texas recovered an Owls fumble at the end of the third quarter but missed a 56-yard field goal to end the ensuing drive. Most of the fourth quarter was taken up by a 13-play and 62-yard drive capped off by a 15-yard touchdown pass by Owls quarterback J.T. Daniels to Luke McCaffrey. This was the only scoring drive by either team in the fourth quarter as Texas would win 37–10. With the win, Texas's record for the season improved to 1–0. The Longhorns remained ranked No. 11 in the AP poll and rose two ranks to No. 10 in the Coaches Poll following the game.

Statistics	Rice	Texas
First downs	8	24
Plays–yards	51–176	75–458
Rushes–yards	25–27	39–158
Passing yards	149	300
Passing: comp–att–int	14–26–2	22–36–0
Turnovers		
Time of possession	28:24	31:36

Team	Category	Player	Statistics
Rice	Passing	JT Daniels	14–26, 149 yards, 1 TD, 2 INT
Rice	Rushing	Dean Connors	8 carries, 19 yards, 0 TD
Rice	Receiving	Braylen Walker	2 receptions, 47 yards, 0 TD
Texas	Passing	Quinn Ewers	19–30, 260 yards, 3 TD, 0 INT
Texas	Rushing	Jaydon Blue	10 carries, 55 yards, 0 TD
Texas	Receiving	Xavier Worthy	7 receptions, 90 yards, 0 TD

Scoring summary

Quarter	Time	Drive			Team	Scoring information	Score	
Quarter	Time	Plays	Yards	TOP	Team	Scoring information	Rice	Texas
1st	10:07	6	8	2:53	Rice	43-yard field goal by Tim Horn	3	0
1st	7:27	6	75	2:40	Texas	Jonathon Brooks 37-yard touchdown reception from Quinn Ewers, Bert Auburn kick good	3	7
2nd	12:59	9	50	2:02	Texas	27-yard field goal by Bert Auburn	3	10
2nd	7:51	7	36	2:02	Texas	46-yard field goal by Bert Auburn	3	13
2nd	0:00	16	66	4:25	Texas	49-yard field goal by Bert Auburn	3	16
3rd	9:37	8	62	3:40	Texas	Adonai Mitchell 9-yard touchdown reception from Quinn Ewers, Bert Auburn kick good	3	23
3rd	5:33	1	44	0:08	Texas	Ja'Tavion Sanders 44-yard touchdown reception from Quinn Ewers, Bert Auburn kick good	3	30
3rd	0:57	9	54	3:35	Texas	Quinn Ewers 1-yard touchdown run, Bert Auburn kick good	3	37
4th	3:04	14	62	9:24	Rice	Luke McCaffrey 15-yard touchdown reception from JT Daniels, Tim Horn kick good	10	37
"TOP" = time of possession. For other American football terms, see Glossary of American football.							10	37

=== at No. 3 Alabama ===
Team	1	2	3	4	Total
• No. 10 Texas	3	10	0	21	34
No. 3 Alabama	0	6	10	8	24

- Date: September 9, 2023
- Location: Bryant-Denny Stadium (Tuscaloosa, AL)
- Game start: 6:14 p.m. CDT
- Elapsed time: 3:24
- Game attendance: 100,077
- Game weather: Clear, 84 °F (29 °C), wind S at 5 mph (8 km/h)
- Referee: Matt Loeffler
- TV announcers (ESPN): Chris Fowler, Kirk Herbstreit, and Holly Rowe

Texas played at Alabama in week 2 of the 2023 season, constituting the second game in the home-and-home series between the two teams. The NCAA and Fox Sports named the matchup as one of the most important non-conference games of the season. The game was selected as the host for the week 2 broadcast of College GameDay, marking Texas's first appearance on the program since their loss to TCU in 2022. Sportsbooks opened with an 8.5-point spread favoring the Crimson Tide, but the spread narrowed to around 7 points by the start of the game.

Texas's first drive after receiving the opening kickoff ended in a punt. On the Alabama Crimson Tide's ensuing drive, Longhorns nickelback Jahdae Barron intercepted Crimson Tide quarterback Jalen Milroe. Texas would subsequently advance into the red zone but would end the drive with a 32-yard field goal after wide receiver Xavier Worthy failed to catch a pass in the end zone. Alabama advanced downfield and scored a 42-yard field goal to tie the game at 3–3 early in the second quarter. The Longhorns scored their first touchdown of the game the following drive with a 44-yard touchdown pass from Ewers to Worthy. Neither team scored a touchdown for the remainder of the first half, exchanging punts and field goals before Texas entered halftime leading 13–6. A potential touchdown for Alabama towards the end of the second quarter was called back after Alabama was penalized for having an ineligible man downfield.

Alabama received the ball to start the second half. The Crimson Tide had an opportunity to tie the game at 13 points apiece, but a holding penalty negated a 32-yard touchdown, forcing Crimson Tide to settle for a 51-yard field goal. Neither team scored for much of the remaining third quarter; one Texas drive ended with kicker Bert Auburn missing a 42-yard field goal. However, Alabama's final drive of the quarter culminated in a 49-yard touchdown pass from Milroe to Jermaine Burton, giving Alabama a 16–13 lead – their first of the game – entering the fourth quarter. Texas followed with a scoring drive that included a 50-yard gain off a pass from Ewers to tight end Ja'Tavion Sanders and a 7-yard touchdown pass from Ewers to Adonai Mitchell to give Texas the lead. Longhorns safety Jerrin Thompson intercepted Milroe on the following drive, returning the ball 32 yards to set up a touchdown run by Jonathon Brooks to give Texas a 27–16 lead. The Crimson Tide subsequently scored off of a 39-yard touchdown pass and successfully converted a two-point conversion to bring the score to 27–24 with Texas narrowly leading. Mitchell caught a 39-yard touchdown pass from Ewers with around eight minutes remaining in the fourth quarter to extend the Longhorns's lead to 10 points on the following drive. Alabama was unable to score on the ensuing drive, leaving Texas with the ball. Texas was able to reach first down twice on its final drive, forcing Alabama to exhaust its three timeouts and successfully running out the clock to secure the Longhorns's 34–24 victory.

The win marked Texas's first against Alabama since the 1982 Cotton Bowl and the first against a team ranked in the top 3 of AP poll since 2008. The win also snapped Alabama's 57-game regular-season nonconference winning streak extending back to 2007, as well as a 21-game home winning streak. The Associated Press and the Houston Chronicle called the victory Sarkisian's biggest in his tenure as head coach at Texas. Ewers received several weekly distinctions for his performance Alabama, including the Walter Camp Foundation Offensive Player of the Week and the Big 12 Offensive Player of the Week. The Longhorns rose seven spots in the AP poll to the No. 4 ranking following the game.

Statistics	Texas	Alabama
First downs	23	18
Plays–yards	75–454	62–362
Rushes–yards	37–105	35–107
Passing yards	349	255
Passing: comp–att–int	24–38–0	14–27–2
Turnovers		
Time of possession	32:31	27:29

Team	Category	Player	Statistics
Texas	Passing	Quinn Ewers	24-38, 349 yards, 3 TD, 0 INT
Texas	Rushing	Jonathon Brooks	14 carries, 57 yards, 1 TD
Texas	Receiving	Ja'Tavion Sanders	5 receptions, 114 yards, 0 TD
Alabama	Passing	Jalen Milroe	14-27, 255 yards, 2 TD, 2 INT
Alabama	Rushing	Jase McClellan	12 carries, 45 yards, 0 TD
Alabama	Receiving	Kobe Prentice	5 receptions, 68 yards, 0 TD

Scoring summary

Quarter	Time	Drive			Team	Scoring information	Score	
Quarter	Time	Plays	Yards	TOP	Team	Scoring information	Texas	Alabama
1st	04:42	10	26	03:45	Texas	32-yard field goal by Bert Auburn	3	0
2nd	14:55	12	51	04:47	Alabama	51-yard field goal by Will Reichard	3	3
2nd	13:26	4	75	01:29	Texas	Xavier Worthy 44-yard touchdown reception from Quinn Ewers, Bert Auburn kick good	10	3
2nd	04:05	14	82	06:25	Texas	29-yard field goal by Bert Auburn	13	3
2nd	00:00	8	50	01:34	Alabama	30-yard field goal by Will Reichard	13	6
3rd	11:04	7	42	03:56	Alabama	51-yard field goal by Will Reichard	13	9
3rd	00:14	5	59	02:38	Alabama	Jermaine Burton 49-yard touchdown reception from Jalen Milroe, Will Reichard kick good	13	16
4th	14:05	3	75	01:09	Texas	Adonai Mitchell 7-yard touchdown reception from Quinn Ewers, Bert Auburn kick good	20	16
4th	13:50	1	5	00:04	Texas	Jonathon Brooks 5-yard touchdown run, Bert Auburn kick good	27	16
4th	11:08	6	75	02:42	Alabama	Amari Niblack 39-yard touchdown reception from Jalen Milroe, 2-point pass good	27	24
4th	08:23	7	75	02:45	Texas	Adonai Mitchell 39-yard touchdown reception from Quinn Ewers, Bert Auburn kick good	34	24
"TOP" = time of possession. For other American football terms, see Glossary of American football.							34	24

=== Wyoming ===
Team	1	2	3	4	Total
Wyoming	7	0	3	0	10
• No. 2 Texas	3	7	0	21	31

- Date: September 16, 2023
- Location: Darrell K Royal–Texas Memorial Stadium (Austin, TX)
- Game start: 7:00 pm
- Game attendance: 101,777
- Game weather: Sunny, 81 °F (27 °C)
- Referee: Kevin Mar
- TV announcers (LHN): Lowell Galindo, Fozzy Whittaker, and Morgan Uber

101,777 is the 8th highest attendance for a game at Darrell K Royal–Texas Memorial Stadium to date. This would later drop to 9th after September 30 vs Kansas and to 10th after November 4 vs Kansas State

Statistics	Wyoming	Texas
First downs	17	13
Plays–yards	66–291	52–316
Rushes–yards	38–155	31–185
Passing yards	136	131
Passing: comp–att–int	17–28–1	11–21–0
Turnovers		
Time of possession	38:47	21:13

Team	Category	Player	Statistics
Wyoming	Passing	Evan Svoboda	17–28, 136 yards, 0 TD, 1 INT
Wyoming	Rushing	Harrison Waylee	18 carries, 110 yards, 1 TD
Wyoming	Receiving	Wyatt Wieland	8 receptions, 62 yards, 0 TD
Texas	Passing	Quinn Ewers	11–21, 131 yards, 2 TD, 0 INT
Texas	Rushing	Jonathon Brooks	21 carries, 164 yards, 0 TD
Texas	Receiving	Xavier Worthy	4 receptions, 56 yards, 1 TD

Scoring summary

Quarter	Time	Drive			Team	Scoring information	Score	
Quarter	Time	Plays	Yards	TOP	Team	Scoring information	Wyoming	Texas
1st	12:45	5	75	02:15	Wyoming	Harrison Waylee 62-yard touchdown run, John Hoyland kick good	7	0
1st	09:46	5	19	01:27	Texas	37-yard field goal by Bert Auburn	7	3
2nd	11:45	17	90	08:03	Texas	Byron Murphy II 1-yard touchdown reception from Quinn Ewers, Bert Auburn kick good	7	10
3rd	00:20	17	77	10:22	Wyoming	36-yard field goal by John Hoyland	10	10
4th	14:12	4	75	01:01	Texas	Xavier Worthy 44-yard touchdown reception from Quinn Ewers, Bert Auburn kick good	10	17
4th	09:01	6	75	02:54	Texas	Quinn Ewers 5-yard touchdown run, Bert Auburn kick good	10	24
4th	08:46	1	27	00:00	Texas	Interception returned 27 yards for touchdown by Jerrin Thompson, Bert Auburn kick good	10	31
"TOP" = time of possession. For other American football terms, see Glossary of American football.							10	31

=== at Baylor ===
Team	1	2	3	4	Total
• No. 3 Texas	7	21	10	0	38
Baylor	3	3	0	0	6

- Date: September 23, 2023
- Location: McLane Stadium (Waco, TX)
- Game start: 6:30 pm
- Game attendance: 49,165
- Game weather: Sunny • 97 °F (36 °C)
- Referee: Derek Anderson
- TV announcers (ABC): Dave Pasch, Dusty Dvoracek, and Tom Luginbill

49,165 is the 3rd highest attendance for a game at McLane Stadium to date

Statistics	Texas	Baylor
First downs	24	19
Plays–yards	59–503	84–365
Rushes–yards	34–175	31–60
Passing yards	328	305
Passing: comp–att–int	19–25–0	29-53-1
Turnovers		
Time of possession	26:30	33:30

Team	Category	Player	Statistics
Texas	Passing	Quinn Ewers	18-23, 293 yards, 1 TD, 0 INT
Texas	Rushing	Jonathon Brooks	18 carries, 106 yards, 2 TD
Texas	Receiving	Ja'Tavion Sanders	5 receptions, 110 yards, 0 TD
Baylor	Passing	Sawyer Robertson	20-35, 203 yards, 0 TD, 1 INT
Baylor	Rushing	RJ Martinez	3 carries, 22 yards, 0 TD
Baylor	Receiving	Monaray Baldwin	3 receptions, 81 yards, 0 TD

Scoring summary

Quarter	Time	Drive			Team	Scoring information	Score	
Quarter	Time	Plays	Yards	TOP	Team	Scoring information	Texas	Baylor
1st	05:15	2	55	00:46	Texas	Jonathon Brooks 40-yard touchdown run, Bert Auburn kick good	7	0
1st	01:07	9	70	04:08	Baylor	22-yard field goal by Isaiah Hankins	7	3
2nd	09:07	9	75	03:28	Texas	Quinn Ewers 29-yard touchdown run, Bert Auburn kick good	14	3
2nd	07:03	2	42	00:32	Texas	CJ Baxter 7-yard touchdown run, Bert Auburn kick good	21	3
2nd	02:26	5	46	01:49	Texas	Jonathon Brooks 2-yard touchdown run, Bert Auburn kick good	28	3
2nd	00:44	4	2	00:50	Baylor	36-yard field goal by Isaiah Hankins	28	6
3rd	12:24	6	55	02:36	Texas	37-yard field goal by Bert Auburn	31	6
3rd	05:36	7	95	03:28	Texas	Xavier Worthy 21-yard touchdown reception from Quinn Ewers, Bert Auburn kick good	38	6
"TOP" = time of possession. For other American football terms, see Glossary of American football.							38	6

=== No. 24 Kansas ===
Team	1	2	3	4	Total
No. 24 Kansas	0	7	7	0	14
• No. 3 Texas	10	3	13	14	40

- Date: September 30, 2023
- Location: Darrell K Royal–Texas Memorial Stadium (Austin, TX)
- Game start: 2:41 p.m. CDT
- Game attendance: 102,986
- Game weather: Sunny, 91 °F (33 °C)
- Referee: Kevin Boitmann
- TV announcers (ABC): Sean McDonough, Greg McElroy, and Molly McGrath

The 661 yards of total offense were the most in Texas history in a Big 12 conference game.

The announced attendance of 102,986 was the 4th highest attendance in program history, to date.

Statistics	Kansas	Texas
First downs	11	33
Plays–yards	46–260	86–661
Rushes–yards	25–124	51–336
Passing yards	136	325
Passing: comp–att–int	9–21–0	25–35–1
Turnovers		
Time of possession	18:27	39:41

Team	Category	Player	Statistics
Kansas	Passing	Jason Bean	9–21, 136 yards, 1 TD, 0 INT
Kansas	Rushing	Devin Neal	8 carries, 45 yards, 0 TD
Kansas	Receiving	Trevor Wilson	1 reception, 58 yards, 1 TD
Texas	Passing	Quinn Ewers	25–35, 325 yards, 1 TD, 1 INT
Texas	Rushing	Jonathon Brooks	20 carries, 217 yards, 2 TD
Texas	Receiving	Adonai Mitchell	10 receptions, 141 yards, 1 TD

Scoring summary

Quarter	Time	Drive			Team	Scoring information	Score	
Quarter	Time	Plays	Yards	TOP	Team	Scoring information	Kansas	Texas
1st	10:06	7	88	02:45	Texas	Quinn Ewers 30-yard touchdown run, Bert Auburn kick good	0	7
1st	01:52	14	76	06:26	Texas	26-yard field goal by Bert Auburn	0	10
2nd	14:05	5	75	00:55	Kansas	Daniel Hishaw 18-yard touchdown run, Seth Keller kick good	7	10
2nd	11:15	5	63	02:50	Texas	30-yard field goal by Bert Auburn	7	13
3rd	13:28	5	71	01:31	Texas	Jonathon Brooks 54-yard touchdown run, Bert Auburn kick good	7	20
3rd	11:36	4	75	01:52	Kansas	Trevor Wilson 58-yard touchdown reception from Jason Bean, Seth Keller kick good	14	20
3rd	02:33	5	32	01:52	Texas	Jonathon Brooks 1-yard touchdown run, 2-point pass failed	14	26
4th	13:06	8	72	03:25	Texas	Adonai Mitchell 9-yard touchdown reception from Quinn Ewers, Bert Auburn kick good	14	33
4th	05:34	12	75	05:51	Texas	Quinn Ewers 1-yard touchdown run, Bert Auburn kick good	14	40
"TOP" = time of possession. For other American football terms, see Glossary of American football.							14	40

=== vs. No. 12 Oklahoma ===
Red River Showdown

Team	1	2	3	4	Total
• No. 12 Oklahoma	7	13	7	7	34
No. 3 Texas	7	10	3	10	30

- Date: October 7, 2023
- Location: Cotton Bowl (Dallas, TX)
- Game start: 11:10 a.m. CDT
- Game attendance: 92,100
- Game weather: Sunny, 63 °F (17 °C)
- Referee: David Alvarez
- TV announcers (ABC): Chris Fowler, Kirk Herbstreit, and Holly Rowe

Statistics	Oklahoma	Texas
First downs	28	25
Plays–yards	81–486	78–527
Rushes–yards	43–201	40–156
Passing yards	285	371
Passing: comp–att–int	23–38–0	32–38–2
Turnovers		
Time of possession	27:49	32:11

Team	Category	Player	Statistics
Oklahoma	Passing	Dillon Gabriel	23–38, 285 yards, 1 TD, 0 INT
Oklahoma	Rushing	Dillon Gabriel	14 carries, 113 yards, 1 TD
Oklahoma	Receiving	Jalil Farooq	5 receptions, 130 yards
Texas	Passing	Quinn Ewers	31–37, 346 yards, 1 TD, 2 INT
Texas	Rushing	Jonathon Brooks	22 carries, 129 yards, 1 TD
Texas	Receiving	Jordan Whittington	10 receptions, 115 yards

Scoring summary

Quarter	Time	Drive			Team	Scoring information	Score	
Quarter	Time	Plays	Yards	TOP	Team	Scoring information	Oklahoma	Texas
1st	13:11	5	22	01:03	Oklahoma	Dillon Gabriel 9-yard touchdown run, Zach Schmit kick good	7	0
1st	09:02	—	—	—	Texas	Malik Muhammad 0-yard return of blocked punt, Bert Auburn kick good	7	7
2nd	14:14	13	78	04:34	Oklahoma	27-yard field goal by Zach Schmit	10	7
2nd	9:27	9	85	04:41	Texas	Gunnar Helm 22-yard touchdown reception from Quinn Ewers, Bert Auburn kick good	10	14
2nd	05:23	10	75	05:23	Oklahoma	Tawee Walker 1-yard touchdown run, Zach Schmit kick good	17	14
2nd	01:53	10	68	03:30	Texas	25-yard field goal by Bert Auburn	17	17
2nd	00:00	9	67	01:53	Oklahoma	26-yard field goal by Zach Smith	20	17
3rd	10:21	13	75	04:39	Oklahoma	Tawee Walker 1-yard touchdown run, Zach Schmit kick good	27	17
3rd	01:53	10	67	04:17	Texas	45-yard field goal by Bert Auburn	27	20
4th	06:10	5	73	01:45	Texas	Jonathon Brooks 29-yard touchdown run, Bert Auburn kick good	27	27
4th	01:17	11	58	03:32	Texas	47-yard field goal by Bert Auburn	27	30
4th	00:15	5	75	01:02	Oklahoma	Nic Anderson 3-yard touchdown reception from Zach Schmit, Zach Schmit kick good	34	30
"TOP" = time of possession. For other American football terms, see Glossary of American football.							34	30

=== at Houston ===
Team	1	2	3	4	Total
• No. 8 Texas	14	7	3	7	31
Houston	0	14	7	3	24

- Date: October 21, 2023
- Location: TDECU Stadium (Houston, TX)
- Game start: 3:05 p.m.
- Game attendance: 42,812
- Game weather: Sunny, 93 °F (34 °C), wind SW at 5 mph (8.0 km/h)
- Referee: Michael VanderVelde
- TV announcers (FOX): Tim Brando and Spencer Tillman

42,812 is the 2nd highest attendance for a game at TDECU Stadium to date

Statistics	Texas	Houston
First downs	19	20
Plays–yards	69–360	65–392
Rushes–yards	37–141	19–14
Passing yards	219	378
Passing: comp–att–int	25–32–0	32–46–1
Turnovers		
Time of possession	31:58	28:02

Team	Category	Player	Statistics
Texas	Passing	Quinn Ewers	23–29, 211 yards, 2 TD
Texas	Rushing	Jonathon Brooks	20 carries, 99 yards
Texas	Receiving	Xavier Worthy	6 receptions, 92 yards, 1 TD
Houston	Passing	Donovan Smith	32–46, 378 yards, 3 TD, 1 INT
Houston	Rushing	Parker Jenkins	9 carries, 23 yards
Houston	Receiving	Joseph Manjack IV	6 receptions, 88 yards, 1 TD

Scoring summary

Quarter	Time	Drive			Team	Scoring information	Score	
Quarter	Time	Plays	Yards	TOP	Team	Scoring information	Texas	Houston
1st	10:02	11	75	04:58	Texas	Adonai Mitchell 14-yard touchdown reception from Quinn Ewers, Bert Auburn kick good	7	0
1st	06:56	4	62	01:36	Texas	Xavier Worthy 42-yard touchdown reception from Quinn Ewers, Bert Auburn kick good	14	0
2nd	12:49	9	58	04:31	Texas	Savion Red 1-yard touchdown run, Bert Auburn kick good	21	0
2nd	06:07	4	71	01:26	Houston	Matthew Golden 32-yard touchdown reception from Donovan Smith, Jack Martin kick good	21	7
2nd	00:26	9	75	02:07	Houston	Joseph Manjack IV 21-yard touchdown reception from Donovan Smith, Jack Martin kick good	21	14
3rd	12:29	6	49	02:24	Houston	Matthew Golden 3-yard touchdown reception from Donovan Smith, Jack Martin kick good	21	21
3rd	03:17	11	31	03:49	Texas	25-yard field goal by Bert Auburn	24	21
4th	07:43	7	68	03:49	Houston	40-yard field goal by Jack Martin	24	24
4th	05:37	6	53	01:58	Texas	CJ Baxter 16-yard touchdown run, Bert Auburn kick good	31	24
"TOP" = time of possession. For other American football terms, see Glossary of American football.							31	24

=== BYU ===
Team	1	2	3	4	Total
BYU	0	3	3	0	6
• No. 7 Texas	14	7	0	14	35

- Date: October 28, 2023
- Location: Darrell K Royal–Texas Memorial Stadium (Austin, TX)
- Game start: 2:41 p.m. CDT
- Game attendance: 101,670
- Game weather: Sunny, 81 °F (27 °C), wind S at 8 mph (13 km/h)
- Referee: Derek Anderson
- TV announcers (ABC): Dave Pasch, Dusty Dvoracek, and Tom Luginbill

101,670 is the 10th highest attendance for a game at Darrell K Royal–Texas Memorial Stadium to date. This would later drop to 11th after November 4 vs Kansas State.

Statistics	BYU	Texas
First downs	17	16
Plays–yards	66–292	60–354
Rushes–yards	26–95	35–194
Passing yards	197	170
Passing: comp–att–int	25–40–2	16–25–1
Turnovers		
Time of possession	33:06	26:54

Team	Category	Player	Statistics
BYU	Passing	Kedon Slovis	25–40, 197 yards, 2 INT
BYU	Rushing	Aidan Robbins	17 carries, 56 yards
BYU	Receiving	Darius Lassiter	5 receptions, 75 yards
Texas	Passing	Maalik Murphy	16–25, 170 yards, 2 TD
Texas	Rushing	Jonathon Brooks	16 carries, 98 yards, 1 TD
Texas	Receiving	Adonai Mitchell	3 receptions, 59 yards, 2 TD

Scoring summary

Quarter	Time	Drive			Team	Scoring information	Score	
Quarter	Time	Plays	Yards	TOP	Team	Scoring information	BYU	Texas
1st	12:08	—	—	—	Texas	Punt returned 74 yards for touchdown by Xavier Worthy, Bert Auburn kick good	0	7
1st	04:10	6	26	03:07	Texas	Jonathon Brooks 4-yard touchdown run, Bert Auburn kick good	0	14
2nd	04:57	16	64	09:57	BYU	24-yard field goal by Will Ferrin	3	14
2nd	00:58	10	75	03:59	Texas	Adonai Mitchell 30-yard touchdown reception from Maalik Murphy, Bert Auburn kick good	3	21
3rd	07:58	7	68	03:43	BYU	32-yard field goal by Will Ferrin	6	21
4th	09:07	1	8	00:04	Texas	Adonai Mitchell 13-yard touchdown reception from Maalik Murphy, Bert Auburn kick good	6	28
4th	01:43	3	39	00:58	Texas	Jaydon Blue 34-yard touchdown run, Bert Auburn kick good	6	35
"TOP" = time of possession. For other American football terms, see Glossary of American football.							6	35

=== No. 23 Kansas State ===
Team	1	2	3	4	OT	Total
No. 23 Kansas State	0	7	7	16	0	30
• No. 7 Texas	10	7	10	3	3	33

- Date: November 4, 2023
- Location: Darrell K Royal–Texas Memorial Stadium (Austin, TX)
- Game start: 11:05 a.m. CDT
- Game attendance: 102,846
- Game weather: Sunny, 68 °F (20 °C)
- Referee: Kevin Mar
- TV announcers (FOX): Gus Johnson, Joel Klatt, Jenny Taft

Fox's Big Noon Kickoff show was on Texas's campus for the first time this season.

102,846 is the 5th highest attendance for a game at Darrell K Royal–Texas Memorial Stadium to date

Statistics	Kansas State	Texas
First downs	20	18
Plays–yards	73–360	74–478
Rushes–yards	29–33	37–230
Passing yards	327	248
Passing: comp–att–int	26–41–1	19–37–2
Turnovers		
Time of possession	27:52	32:08

Team	Category	Player	Statistics
Kansas State	Passing	Will Howard	26–42, 327 yards, 4 TD, 1 INT
Kansas State	Rushing	Treshaun Ward	9 carries, 30 yards
Kansas State	Receiving	Jayce Brown	4 receptions, 77 yards, 1 TD
Texas	Passing	Maalik Murphy	19–37, 248 yards, 1 TD, 2 INT
Texas	Rushing	Jonathon Brooks	22 carries, 112 yards, 1 TD
Texas	Receiving	Adonai Mitchell	8 receptions, 149 yards, 1 TD

Scoring summary

Quarter	Time	Drive			Team	Scoring information	Score	
Quarter	Time	Plays	Yards	TOP	Team	Scoring information	Kansas State	Texas
1st	08:36	3	47	01:13	Texas	Adonai Mitchell 37-yard touchdown reception from Maalik Murphy, Bert Auburn kick good	0	7
1st	01:06	9	79	03:58	Texas	32-yard field goal by Bert Auburn	0	10
2nd	11:34	4	63	02:37	Texas	CJ Baxter 54-yard touchdown run, Bert Auburn kick good	0	17
2nd	00:54	4	42	00:41	Kansas State	Phillip Brooks 6-yard touchdown reception from Will Howard, Chris Tennant kick good	7	17
3rd	09:21	1	5	00:05	Texas	Jonathon Brooks 5-yard touchdown run, Bert Auburn kick good	7	24
3rd	04:13	7	41	03:07	Texas	49-yard field goal by Bert Auburn	7	27
3rd	00:00	8	75	04:13	Kansas State	Phillip Brooks 26-yard touchdown reception from Will Howard, Chris Tennant kick good	14	27
4th	13:33	2	12	00:15	Kansas State	Keagan Johnson 12-yard touchdown reception from Will Howard, Chris Tennant kick good	21	27
4th	12:37	1	32	00:07	Kansas State	Jayce Brown 32-yard touchdown reception from Will Howard, 2-point run failed	27	27
4th	06:03	14	69	06:27	Texas	34-yard field goal by Bert Auburn	27	30
4th	00:01	10	33	01:17	Kansas State	45-yard field goal by Chris Tennant	30	30
OT	—	4	1	—	Texas	42-yard field goal by Bert Auburn	30	33
"TOP" = time of possession. For other American football terms, see Glossary of American football.							30	33

=== at TCU ===
TCU–Texas football rivalry

Team	1	2	3	4	Total
• No. 7 Texas	7	19	0	3	29
TCU	6	0	0	20	26

- Date: November 11, 2023
- Location: Amon G. Carter Stadium (Fort Worth, TX)
- Game start: 6:44 p.m. CST
- Game attendance: 50,812
- Game weather: Cloudy, 61 °F (16 °C), wind E at 6 mph (9.7 km/h)
- Referee: Tutashinda Salaam
- TV announcers (ABC): Dave Pasch, Dusty Dvoracek, and Tom Luginbill

50,812 is the 3rd highest attendance for a game at Amon G. Carter Stadium to date

Statistics	Texas	TCU
First downs	22	22
Plays–yards	74–482	64–390
Rushes–yards	41–165	28–88
Passing yards	317	302
Passing: comp–att–int	22–33–1	24–36–1
Turnovers		
Time of possession	34:18	25:42

Team	Category	Player	Statistics
Texas	Passing	Quinn Ewers	22–33, 317 yards, 1 TD, 1 INT
Texas	Rushing	Jonathon Brooks	21 carries, 104 yards, 2 TD
Texas	Receiving	Xavier Worthy	10 receptions, 137 yards
TCU	Passing	Josh Hoover	24–36, 302 yards, 2 TD, 1 INT
TCU	Rushing	Emani Bailey	21 carries, 98 yards, 1 TD
TCU	Receiving	Savion Williams	11 receptions, 164 yards, 1 TD

Scoring summary

Quarter	Time	Drive			Team	Scoring information	Score	
Quarter	Time	Plays	Yards	TOP	Team	Scoring information	Texas	TCU
1st	07:41	7	29	02:42	TCU	41-yard field goal by Griffin Kell	0	3
1st	06:53	2	75	00:48	Texas	Jonathon Brooks 2-yard touchdown run, Bert Auburn kick good	7	3
1st	04:35	5	37	02:18	TCU	56-yard field goal by Griffin Kell	7	6
2nd	14:50	6	52	02:32	Texas	30-yard field goal by Bert Auburn	10	6
2nd	08:32	9	43	05:03	Texas	32-yard field goal by Bert Auburn	13	6
2nd	01:01	13	85	04:54	Texas	Adonai Mitchell 6-yard touchdown reception from Quinn Ewers, 2-point pass failed	19	6
2nd	00:12	5	43	00:39	Texas	Jonathon Brooks 22-yard touchdown run, Bert Auburn kick good	26	6
4th	14:02	6	74	02:00	TCU	Emani Bailey 17-yard touchdown run, Griffin Kell kick good	26	13
4th	08:53	10	44	05:09	Texas	49-yard field goal by Bert Auburn	29	13
4th	05:51	9	75	03:02	TCU	JP Richardson 3-yard touchdown reception from Josh Hoover, 2-point pass failed	29	19
4th	03:28	3	36	00:35	TCU	Savion Williams 17-yard touchdown reception from Josh Hoover, Griffin Kell kick good	29	26
"TOP" = time of possession. For other American football terms, see Glossary of American football.							29	26

=== at Iowa State ===
Team	1	2	3	4	Total
• No. 7 Texas	0	6	9	11	26
Iowa State	3	0	6	7	16

- Date: November 18, 2023
- Location: Jack Trice Stadium (Ames, IA)
- Game start: 07:05 p.m. CST
- Game attendance: 61,500
- Game weather: Clear, 55 °F (13 °C), wind calm
- Referee: Kevin Boitmann
- TV announcers (FOX): Jason Benetti, Brock Huard, Allison Williams
- Sources::

Statistics	Texas	Iowa State
First downs	23	16
Plays–yards	67–404	53–332
Rushes–yards	34–123	21–9
Passing yards	281	323
Passing: comp–att–int	23–33–0	24–32–1
Turnovers		
Time of possession	31:18	28:42

Team	Category	Player	Statistics
Texas	Passing	Quinn Ewers	23–33, 281 yards, 2 TD
Texas	Rushing	CJ Baxter	20 carries, 117 yards
Texas	Receiving	Xavier Worthy	4 receptions, 77 yards
Iowa State	Passing	Rocco Becht	24–32, 323 yards, 2 TD, 1 INT
Iowa State	Rushing	Abu Sama	7 carries, 11 yards
Iowa State	Receiving	Jayden Higgins	7 receptions, 104 yards

Scoring summary

Quarter	Time	Drive			Team	Scoring information	Score	
Quarter	Time	Plays	Yards	TOP	Team	Scoring information	Texas	Iowa State
1st	03:27	11	53	05:47	Iowa State	45-yard field goal by Chase Contreraz	0	3
2nd	11:17	7	11	03:31	Texas	39-yard field goal by Bert Auburn	3	3
2nd	00:00	10	58	02:25	Texas	50-yard field goal by Bert Auburn	6	3
3rd	05:53	9	91	04:25	Texas	Jordan Whittington 23-yard touchdown reception from Quinn Ewers, Bert Auburn kick good	13	3
3rd	02:13	7	83	03:34	Iowa State	Eli Sanders 23-yard touchdown reception from Rocco Becht, Chase Conteraz kick blocked	13	9
3rd	02:13	—	—	—	Texas	Austin Jordan 82-yard blocked point after touchdown return	15	9
4th	14:52	3	57	01:06	Texas	Gunnar Helm 31-yard touchdown reception from Quinn Ewers, 2-point pass to Jordan Whittington good	23	9
4th	12:44	4	75	02:08	Iowa State	Easton Dean 66-yard touchdown reception from Rocco Becht, Chase Contreraz kick good	23	16
4th	06:14	11	56	06:26	Texas	42-yard field goal by Bert Auburn	26	16
"TOP" = time of possession. For other American football terms, see Glossary of American football.							26	16

=== Texas Tech ===
Texas–Texas Tech football rivalry

Team	1	2	3	4	Total
Texas Tech	7	0	0	0	7
• No. 7 Texas	10	16	24	7	57

- Date: November 24, 2023
- Location: Darrell K Royal–Texas Memorial Stadium (Austin, TX)
- Game start: 6:44 p.m. CST
- Game attendance: 102,452
- Game weather: 62 °F (17 °C), Sunny
- Referee: Kevin Mar
- TV announcers (ABC): Dave Pasch, Dusty Dvoracek, Tom Luginbill

Texas Kicker Bert Auburn was 5 for 5 in field goal kicking, tying the program record of 5 field goals in a game. Additionally, Auburn extended his field goal streak to 19, passing the previous school record of 15 consecutive field goals held by Phil Dawson and Anthony Fera as well as passing Hunter Lawrence (24 FGs) for most field goals in a single season at 28. With 5 field goals and 6 PATs, Auburn also set a single game record of 21 points for a kicker.

Statistics	Texas Tech	Texas
First downs	14	27
Plays–yards	64–198	75–528
Rushes–yards	28–110	43–302
Passing yards	88	226
Passing: comp–att–int	19–36–3	19–32–1
Turnovers		
Time of possession	27:00	33:00

Team	Category	Player	Statistics
Texas Tech	Passing	Behren Morton	19–36, 88 yards, 3 INT
Texas Tech	Rushing	Tahj Brooks	19 carries, 95 yards
Texas Tech	Receiving	Coy Eakin	4 receptions, 27 yards
Texas	Passing	Quinn Ewers	17–26, 196 yards, 1 TD, 1 INT
Texas	Rushing	Jaydon Blue	10 carries, 121 yards, 1 TD
Texas	Receiving	Xavier Worthy	4 receptions, 49 yards, 1 TD

Scoring summary

Quarter	Time	Drive			Team	Scoring information	Score	
Quarter	Time	Plays	Yards	TOP	Team	Scoring information	Texas Tech	Texas
1st	10:29	7	56	03:37	Texas	Keilan Robinson 10-yard touchdown run, Bert Auburn kick good	0	7
1st	02:15	5	27	01:21	Texas	34-yard field goal by Bert Auburn	0	10
1st	00:29	4	44	01:37	Texas Tech	Behren Morton 2-yard touchdown run, Gino Garcia kick good	7	10
2nd	14:50	2	74	00:34	Texas	Jaydon Blue 69-yard touchdown run, Bert Auburn kick good	7	17
2nd	10:07	4	1	00:56	Texas	37-yard field goal by Bert Auburn	7	20
2nd	02:44	7	33	02:29	Texas	26-yard field goal by Bert Auburn	7	23
2nd	00:00	5	19	00:31	Texas	44-yard field goal by Bert Auburn	7	26
3rd	14:46	—	—	—	Texas	Kickoff returned 95 yards for touchdown by Keilan Robinson, Bert Auburn kick good	7	33
3rd	09:15	6	6	02:13	Texas	54-yard field goal by Bert Auburn	7	36
3rd	04:44	6	62	02:36	Texas	Xavier Worthy 19-yard touchdown reception from Quinn Ewers, Bert Auburn kick good	7	43
3rd	03:26	—	—	—	Texas	Interception returned 43 yards for touchdown by Jett Bush, Bert Auburn kick good	7	50
4th	00:38	13	91	07:59	Texas	Quintrevion Wisner 10-yard touchdown run, Bert Auburn kick good	7	57
"TOP" = time of possession. For other American football terms, see Glossary of American football.							7	57

=== vs. No. 18 Oklahoma State (Big 12 Championship) ===
2023 Big 12 Championship Game

Team	1	2	3	4	Total
No. 18 Oklahoma State	7	7	0	7	21
• No. 7 Texas	21	14	7	7	49

- Date: December 2, 2023
- Location: AT&T Stadium (Arlington, TX)
- Game start: 11:00 a.m. CST
- Game attendance: 84,523
- Game weather: Indoor
- Referee: Derek Anderson
- TV announcers (ABC): Sean McDonough, Greg McElroy, Molly McGrath

Quinn Ewers passed for 452 yards and 4 touchdowns, setting the Big 12 Championship Game record for passing yards and tying the record for passing touchdowns.

Statistics	Oklahoma State	Texas
First downs	13	33
Plays–yards	56–281	87–662
Rushes–yards	18–31	40–198
Passing yards	250	464
Passing: comp–att–int	22–38–1	36–47–1
Turnovers		
Time of possession	19:54	40:06

Team	Category	Player	Statistics
Oklahoma State	Passing	Alan Bowman	22/38, 250 yards, 3 TD, INT
Oklahoma State	Rushing	Ollie Gordon II	13 carries, 34 yards
Oklahoma State	Receiving	Brennan Presley	9 receptions, 93 yards, TD
Texas	Passing	Quinn Ewers	35/46, 452 yards, 4 TD, INT
Texas	Rushing	Keilan Robinson	4 carries, 75 yards, 2 TD
Texas	Receiving	Ja'Tavion Sanders	8 receptions, 105 yards, TD

Scoring summary

Quarter	Time	Drive			Team	Scoring information	Score	
Quarter	Time	Plays	Yards	TOP	Team	Scoring information	Oklahoma State	Texas
1st	12:52	4	39	01:29	Texas	Adonai Mitchell 10-yard touchdown reception from Quinn Ewers, Bert Auburt kick good	0	7
1st	08:34	4	84	01:54	Texas	Ja'Tavion Sanders 24-yard touchdown reception from Quinn Ewers, Bert Auburn kick good	0	14
1st	05:36	8	75	02:58	Oklahoma State	Brennan Presley 5-yard touchdown reception from Alan Bowman, Logan Ward kick good	7	14
1st	01:41	9	77	03:49	Texas	T'Vondre Sweat 2-yard touchdown reception from Quinn Ewers, Bert Auburn kick good	7	21
2nd	11:40	7	95	03:12	Texas	CJ Baxter 10-yard touchdown run, Bert Auburn kick good	7	28
2nd	05:50	2	3	01:16	Oklahoma State	Rashod Owens 7-yard touchdown reception from Alan Bowman, Logan Ward kick good	14	28
2nd	02:11	10	82	03:34	Texas	Jaydon Blue 8-yard touchdown reception from Quinn Ewers, Bert Auburn kick good	14	35
3rd	03:33	6	79	03:07	Texas	Keilan Robinson 57-yard touchdown run, Bert Auburn kick good	12	42
4th	10:38	15	88	06:47	Texas	Keilan Robinson 11-yard touchdown run, Bert Auburn kick good	14	49
4th	06:26	10	89	04:05	Oklahoma State	Rashod Owens 3-yard touchdown reception from Alan Bowman, Logan Ward kick good	21	49
"TOP" = time of possession. For other American football terms, see Glossary of American football.							21	49

=== vs. No. 2 Washington (Sugar Bowl-CFP Semifinal) ===
2024 Sugar Bowl-CFP Semifinal

Team	1	2	3	4	Total
No. 3 Texas	7	14	0	10	31
• No. 2 Washington	7	14	10	6	37

- Date: January 1, 2024
- Location: Caesars Superdome (New Orleans, LA)
- Game start: 7:45 p.m. CST
- Game attendance: 68,791
- Game weather: Indoor
- Referee: Ron Snodgrass
- TV announcers (ESPN): Sean McDonough (play-by-play), Greg McElroy (analyst), Molly McGrath and Katie George (sidelines)

Statistics	TEX	WASH
First downs	23	25
Plays–yards	71–498	70–532
Rushes–yards	28–180	31–102
Passing yards	318	430
Passing: comp–att–int	24–43–0	29–39–0
Turnovers		
Time of possession	23:40	36:20

Team	Category	Player	Statistics
Texas	Passing	Quinn Ewers	24-43, 318 yards, 1 TD
Texas	Rushing	CJ Baxter	9 carries, 64 yards, 1 TD
Texas	Receiving	Ja'Tavion Sanders	6 receptions, 75 yards
Washington	Passing	Michael Penix Jr.	29-38, 430 yards, 2 TD
Washington	Rushing	Dillon Johnson	21 carries, 49 yards, 2 TD
Washington	Receiving	Rome Odunze	6 receptions, 125 yards

Scoring summary

Quarter	Time	Drive			Team	Scoring information	Score	
Quarter	Time	Plays	Yards	TOP	Team	Scoring information	Texas	Washington
1	11:01	4	89	2:59	WASH	Dillon Johnson 2-yard touchdown run, Grady Gross kick good	0	7
1	7:06	7	75	3:55	TEX	Jaydon Blue 5-yard touchdown run, Bert Auburn kick good	7	7
2	13:08	9	80	4:26	WASH	Dillon Johnson 1-yard touchdown run, Grady Gross kick good	7	14
2	10:08	3	22	1:37	TEX	Byron Murphy II 1-yard touchdown run, Bert Auburn kick good	14	14
2	1:27	9	76	4:28	WASH	Ja'Lynn Polk 29-yard touchdown reception from Michael Penix Jr., Grady Gross kick good	14	21
2	0:17	10	72	1:10	TEX	CJ Baxter 1-yard touchdown run, Bert Auburn kick good	21	21
3	10:30	8	70	4:30	WASH	Jalen McMillan 19-yard touchdown reception from Michael Penix Jr., Grady Gross kick good	21	28
3	7:44	5	2	2:30	WASH	26-yard field goal by Grady Gross	21	31
4	14:51	12	58	5:48	WASH	40-yard field goal by Grady Gross	21	34
4	7:23	10	72	3:56	TEX	Adonai Mitchell 1-yard touchdown reception from Quinn Ewers, kick good	28	34
4	2:40	10	65	4:43	WASH	27-yard field goal by Grady Gross	28	37
4	1:09	8	68	1:31	TEX	25-yard field goal by Bert Auburn	31	37
"TOP" = time of possession. For other American football terms, see Glossary of American football.							31	37

== Awards and honors ==
=== National awards and honors ===
Weekly honors
Honors	Player	Position	Date Awarded	Ref.
Walter Camp National Player of the Week	Quinn Ewers	QB	September 10, 2023	
Davey O'Brien National Quarterback of the Week	Quinn Ewers	QB	September 12, 2023	
Maxwell Player of the Week	Quinn Ewers	QB	September 12, 2023	
East-West Shrine Bowl’s Texas Star of the Week	Jahdae Barron	DB	September 12, 2023	
Shaun Alexander Freshman of the Week	Anthony Hill	LB	September 12, 2023	
John Mackey Tight End of the Week	Ja'Tavion Sanders	TE	September 13, 2023	
Reese’s Senior Bowl Defensive Player of the Week	Jaylan Ford	LB	September 25, 2023	

Postseason Awards
Honors	Player	Position	Ref.
Outland Trophy	T'Vondre Sweat	DT	

=== Conference honors ===
Weekly honors
Honors	Player	Position	Date Awarded	Ref.
Big 12 Offensive Player of the Week	Quinn Ewers	QB	September 11, 2023	
Big 12 Newcomer of the Week	Adonai Mitchell	WR	September 11, 2023	
Big 12 Offensive Player of the Week	Jonathon Brooks	RB	October 2, 2023	
Big 12 Newcomer of the Week	Adonai Mitchell	WR	October 2, 2023	
Big 12 Special Teams Player of the Week	Xavier Worthy	WR	October 30, 2023	
Big 12 Newcomer of the Week	Adonai Mitchell	WR	November 6, 2023	
Big 12 Special Teams Player of the Week	Bert Auburn	K	November 6, 2023	

Big 12 Individual Awards
Honors	Player	Position	Class	Ref.
Defensive Player of the Year	T'Vondre Sweat	DT	Senior	
CO-Defensive Freshman of the Year	Anthony Hill Jr.	LB	Freshman	
Defensive Lineman of the Year	Byron Murphy II	DT	Junior	
Offensive Newcomer of the Year	Adonai Mitchell	WR	Junior	
Honorable Mention - Offensive Lineman of the Year	Kelvin Banks Jr.	OL	Sophomore	
Honorable Mention - Offensive Freshman of the Year	CJ Baxter	RB	Freshman	
Honorable Mention - Offensive Player of the Year	Jonathon Brooks	RB	Junior	
Honorable Mention - Defensive Newcomer of the Year	Trill Carter	DL	Senior	
Honorable Mention - Special Teams Player of the Year	Kitan Crawford	DB	Senior	
Big 12 Championship Game Most Valuable Player	Quinn Ewers	QB	Sophomore	

All-Big 12 Team
Player	Position	Class	Team	Ref.
Xavier Worthy	WR	Junior	1st	
Ja'Tavion Sanders	TE	Junior	1st	
Kelvin Banks Jr.	OL	Sophomore	1st	
Byron Murphy II	DL	Junior	1st	
T'Vondre Sweat	DL	Senior	1st	
Jaylan Ford	LB	Senior	1st	
Bert Auburn	PK	Junior	1st	
Xavier Worthy	RS	Junior	1st	
Jonathon Brooks	RB	Junior	2nd	
Adonai Mitchell	WR	Junior	2nd	
Jahdae Barron	DB	Senior	2nd	
CJ Baxter	RB	Freshman	Honorable; Mention	
Terrance Brooks	DB	Sophomore	Honorable; Mention	
Ethan Burke	DL	Sophomore	Honorable; Mention	
Alfred Collins	DL	Senior	Honorable; Mention	
Quinn Ewers	QB	Sophomore	Honorable; Mention	
Gunnar Helm	TE	Junior	Honorable; Mention	
Anthony Hill Jr.	LB	Freshman	Honorable; Mention	
Christian Jones	OL	Senior	Honorable; Mention	
Jake Majors	OL	Junior	Honorable; Mention	
Ryan Sanborn	P	Senior	Honorable; Mention	
Barryn Sorrell	DL	Junior	Honorable; Mention	
Michael Taaffe	DB	Sophomore	Honorable; Mention	
Jerrin Thompson	DB	Senior	Honorable; Mention	
Jordan Whittington	WR	Senior	Honorable; Mention	

=== All-Americans ===
NCAA Recognized All-American Honors
Player	AP	AFCA	FWAA	TSN	WCFF	Designation
T'Vondre Sweat	1st	1st	1st	1st	1st	Unanimous
Xavier Worthy	3rd	2nd	2nd	2nd	–	
Byron Murphy II	2nd	–	–	2nd	–	
Kelvin Banks Jr.	–	2nd	–	–	–	
The NCAA recognizes a selection to all five of the AP, AFCA, FWAA, TSN and WCFF first teams for unanimous selections and three of five for consensus selections. HM = Honorable mention. Source:

Other All-American Honors
Player	Athletic	Athlon	BR	CBS Sports	CFN	ESPN	FOX Sports	Phil Steele	SI	USA Today
T'Vondre Sweat	1st			1st		1st	1st		1st	1st
Xavier Worthy	1st			1st					–	1st
Ja'Tavion Sanders	–			2nd					–	–
Byron Murphy II	2nd			2nd					2nd	–

=== NFL draft ===
The NFL draft was held at Campus Martius Park in Detroit, MI on April 25–27, 2024.

Longhorns who were picked in the 2024 NFL Draft:

Round	Pick	Player	Position	NFL team
1	16	Byron Murphy II	DT	Seattle Seahawks
1	28	Xavier Worthy	WR	Kansas City Chiefs
2	38	T'Vondre Sweat	DT	Tennessee Titans
2	46	Jonathon Brooks	RB	Carolina Panthers
2	52	Adonai Mitchell	WR	Indianapolis Colts
4	101	Ja'Tavion Sanders	TE	Carolina Panthers
5	162	Christian Jones	OT	Arizona Cardinals
5	167	Keilan Robinson	RB	Jacksonville Jaguars
5	175	Jaylan Ford	LB	New Orleans Saints
6	195	Ryan Watts	CB	Pittsburgh Steelers
6	213	Jordan Whittington	WR	Los Angeles Rams

== Statistics ==
Team Statistics
	Texas	Opponents
Total Points	501	265
Total Points per game	35.8	18.9
Total Touchdowns	59	30
Total First Downs	323	248
Rushing	128	72
Passing	180	156
Penalties	15	20
Rushing Total Yards	2,919 yds	1,482 yds
Rushing yards for loss	281 yds	329 yds
Rushing Attempts	527	397
Average Per Rushing ATTs	5.0	2.9
Average Per Game	188.4	82.4
Rushing TDs	29	9
Passing total yards	4,047 yds	3,561 yds
Comp–Att-INTs	317-475-9	307-503-16
Average Per Game	289.1	254.4
Average per attempt	8.5	7.1
Passing TDs	25	21
Total Offensive plays	1,002	900
Total Yards	6,685 yds	4,714 yds
Average per plays	6.7	5.2
Average per games	477.5	336.7
Kickoff Returns: # – Yards- TDs	31-636-1	31-614-0
Average per kickoff	20.5	19.8
Punt Returns: # – Yards- TDs	25-393-2	15-87-0
Average per punt	15.7	5.8
INT Returns: # – Yards- TDs	16-210-0	9-137-0
Average per interceptions	13.1	15.2
Punt Yards	1,828	3,124
Punt average per games	44.6	42.2
Punt net. average	41.5	36.9
FG: FGM - FGA	29-35	19-22
Onside kicks	0-1	0-0
Penalties – Yards	92-731	63-485
Average per games (YRDS)	52.2	34.6
Time of possession	07:17:04	06:41:04
Average per game	31:13	28:39
Miscellaneous: 3rd–Down Conversion %	38.4%	26.6%
Miscellaneous:4th–Down Conversion %	61.3%	46.4%
Sacks - Yards	32–220	28–165
Fumbles – Fumbles Lost	19-9	14–8
Miscellaneous: Yards	82	0
Red Zone: Score attempts	49-61	31-42
Red Zone: Touchdowns	31-61	19-42

=== Individual statistics ===
Passing statistics
#	NAME	POS	RAT	CMP	ATT	YDS	AVG/G	CMP%	TD	INT	LONG
3	Quinn Ewers	QB	158.6	272	394	3,479	289.9	69.0%	22	6	73
6	Maalik Murphy	QB	118.3	40	71	477	68.1	56.3%	3	3	47
1	Xavier Worthy	WR	197.0	1	2	35	2.5	50.0%	0	0	35
16	Arch Manning	QB	90.4	2	5	30	15.0	40.0%	0	0	17
17	Savion Red	RB	310.0	1	1	25	2.1	100.0%	0	0	25
27	Ryan Sanborn	P	108.4	1	1	1	0.07	100.0%	0	0	1
	TOTALS		151.9	317	475	4,047	289.1	66.7%	25	9	73

Rushing statistics
#	NAME	POS	ATT	GAIN	AVG	TD	LONG	AVG/G
24	Jonathon Brooks	RB	187	1,139	6.1	10	67	103.6
4	CJ Baxter	RB	138	659	4.8	5	54	50.7
23	Jaydon Blue	RB	65	398	6.1	3	69	28.4
7	Keilan Robinson	RB	12	134	11.2	3	57	10.3
17	Savion Red	RB	30	131	4.4	1	24	10.9
3	Quinn Ewers	QB	59	75	1.3	5	30	6.3
26	Quintrevion Wisner	RB	12	73	6.1	1	21	5.2
1	Xavier Worthy	WR	4	35	8.8	0	16	2.5
13	Jordan Whittington	WR	3	18	6.0	0	20	1.3
16	Arch Manning	QB	3	7	2.3	0	12	3.5
5	Adonai Mitchell	WR	2	1	0.5	0	5	0.1
90	Byron Murphy II	DL	1	1	1.0	1	1	0.1
6	Maalik Murphy	QB	1	-18	-18.0	0	0	-2.6
	TOTALS		527	2,638	5.0	29	69	188.4

Receiving statistics
#	NAME	POS	REC	YDS	AVG	TD	LONG	AVG/G
1	Xavier Worthy	WR	75	1,014	13.5	5	54	72.4
5	Adonai Mitchell	WR	55	845	15.4	11	62	60.4
0	Ja'Tavion Sanders	TE	45	682	15.2	2	50	48.7
13	Jordan Whittington	WR	42	505	12.0	1	41	36.1
24	Jonathon Brooks	RB	25	286	11.4	1	73	26.0
85	Gunnar Helm	TE	14	192	13.7	2	31	13.7
4	CJ Baxter	RB	24	156	6.5	0	31	12.0
2	Johntay Cook II	WR	8	136	17.0	0	51	9.7
23	Jaydon Blue	RB	14	135	9.6	1	19	9.6
7	Keilan Robinson	RB	8	56	7.0	0	16	4.3
9	Isaiah Neyor	WR	1	14	14.0	0	14	14.0
8	Casey Cain	WR	1	13	13.0	0	13	1.4
80	Malik Agbo	OL	1	6	6.0	0	6	0.4
3	Quinn Ewers	QB	1	3	3.0	0	3	0.3
93	T'Vondre Sweat	DL	1	2	2.0	1	2	0.1
45	Bert Auburn	K	1	1	1.0	0	1	0.7
90	Byron Murphy II	DL	1	1	1.0	1	1	0.7
	TOTALS		317	4,047	12.8	25	73	289.1

==== Defense ====
Defense statistics
#	NAME	POS	SOLO	AST	TOT	TFL-YDS	SACK-YDS	INT	BU	QBH	FR	FF	BLK	SAF	TD
41	Jaylan Ford	LB	46	55	101.0	10.5-30	1.0-9	2	2	6	1	1	0	0	0
0	Anthony Hill Jr.	LB	40	27	67.0	8.0-31	5.0-27	0	2	4	0	1	0	0	0
23	Jahdae Barron	DB	32	29	61.0	4.5-15	0.0-0	1	6	0	1	0	0	0	0
33	David Gbenda	LB	23	27	50.0	3.5-19	1.5-15	0	1	3	0	0	0	0	0
16	Michael Taaffe	DB	28	20	48.0	2.5-6	0.0-0	3	2	1	0	0	1	0	0
93	T'Vondre Sweat	DL	18	27	45.0	8.0-22	2.0-10	0	4	7	0	0	1	0	0
2	Derek Williams Jr.	DB	24	18	42.0	2.0-2	0.0-0	0	2	0	0	0	0	0	0
91	Ethan Burke	EDGE	21	20	41.0	9.0-41	5.5-35	0	0	2	1	1	0	0	0
28	Jerrin Thompson	DB	19	19	38.0	0.5-0	0.0-0	3	7	0	0	0	0	0	0
6	Ryan Watts	DB	30	8	38.0	1.0-1	0.0-0	0	3	0	0	0	0	0	0
88	Barryn Sorrell	EDGE	17	20	37.0	4.5-33	4.0-32	0	0	10	0	0	0	0	0
5	Malik Muhammad	DB	21	10	31.0	0.0-0	0.0-0	1	4	0	0	0	0	0	0
90	Byron Murphy II	DL	13	16	29.0	8.5-40	5.0-32	0	0	7	0	0	0	0	0
21	Kitan Crawford	DB	18	6	24.0	1.0-2	0.0-0	1	1	0	0	0	1	0	0
95	Alfred Collins	DL	12	10	22.0	2.0-12	2.0-12	0	2	5	0	0	0	0	0
37	Morice Blackwell Jr.	LB	12	9	21.0	3.0-5	0.0-0	0	1	1	1	0	0	0	0
8	Terrance Brooks	DB	13	7	20.0	0.0-0	0.0-0	3	6	0	0	0	0	0	0
45	Vernon Broughton	DL	7	10	17.0	4.5-8	1.0-3	0	1	1	1	0	0	0	0
43	Jett Bush	LB	8	9	17.0	3.0-20	2.0-17	1	1	0	1	0	0	0	0
11	Jalen Catalon	DB	15	2	17.0	1.0-1	0.0-0	0	0	0	0	1	0	0	0
9	Gavin Holmes	DB	13	3	16.0	0.0-0	0.0-0	0	2	0	0	0	0	0	0
1	Justice Finkley	EDGE	8	6	14.0	3.0-25	2.0-23	0	0	4	0	1	0	0	0
98	Trill Carter	DL	2	7	9.0	1.5-5	1.0-5	0	0	1	0	0	0	0	0
17	J'Mond Tapp	EDGE	5	3	8.0	1.5-8	0.0-0	0	0	1	0	0	0	0	0
3	Jaylon Guilbeau	DB	4	3	7.0	1.0-2	0.0-0	0	2	0	0	0	0	0	0
18	Liona Lefau	LB	3	4	7.0	0.0-0	0.0-0	0	0	0	0	0	0	0	0
26	Quintrevion Wisner	RB	3	4	7.0	0.0-0	0.0-0	0	0	0	0	0	0	0	0
15	Will Stone	K	5	0	5.0	0.0-0	0.0-0	0	0	0	0	0	0	0	0
94	Jaray Bledsoe	DL	2	2	4.0	1.0-2	0.0-0	0	0	1	1	0	0	0	0
4	Austin Jordan	DB	1	3	4.0	0.0-0	0.0-0	1	0	0	0	0	0	0	0
99	Sydir Mitchell	DL	3	0	3.0	0.0-0	0.0-0	0	0	0	0	0	0	0	0
24	Jonathon Brooks	RB	2	0	2.0	0.0-0	0.0-0	0	0	0	0	0	0	0	0
25	Jelani McDonald	DB	1	1	2.0	0.0-0	0.0-0	0	0	0	0	0	0	0	0
7	Keilan Robinson	RB	1	1	2.0	0.0-0	0.0-0	0	0	0	0	0	0	0	0
1	Xavier Worthy	WR	2	0	2.0	0.0-0	0.0-0	0	0	0	1	0	0	0	0
78	Kelvin Banks Jr.	OL	1	0	1.0	0.0-0	0.0-0	0	0	0	0	1	0	0	0
23	Jaydon Blue	RB	1	0	1.0	0.0-0	0.0-0	0	0	0	0	0	0	0	0
14	X'Avion Brice	DB	1	0	1.0	0.0-0	0.0-0	0	1	0	0	0	0	0	0
53	Aaron Bryant	DL	1	0	1.0	0.0-0	0.0-0	0	0	0	0	0	0	0	0
76	Hayden Conner	OL	1	0	1.0	0.0-0	0.0-0	0	0	0	0	0	0	0	0
85	Gunnar Helm	TE	1	0	1.0	0.0-0	0.0-0	0	0	0	0	0	0	0	0
44	Tannahill Love	LB	1	0	1.0	0.0-0	0.0-0	0	0	0	0	0	0	0	0
97	Kristopher Ross	DL	0	1	1.0	0.0-0	0.0-0	0	0	1	0	0	0	0	0
58	Lance St. Louis	DS	0	1	1.0	0.0-0	0.0-0	0	0	0	0	0	0	0	0
13	Jordan Whittington	WR	1	0	1.0	0.0-0	0.0-0	0	0	0	0	1	0	0	0
29	Ky Woods	RB	1	0	1.0	0.0-0	0.0-0	0	0	0	0	0	0	0	0
	TOTAL		481	388	869.0	85.0-330	32.0-220	16	50	55	8	8	3	0	0

Key: POS: Position, SOLO: Solo Tackles, AST: Assisted Tackles, TOT: Total Tackles, TFL: Tackles-for-loss, SACK: Quarterback Sacks, INT: Interceptions, BU: Passes Broken Up, PD: Passes Defended, QBH: Quarterback Hits, FR: Fumbles Recovered, FF: Forced Fumbles, BLK: Kicks or Punts Blocked, SAF: Safeties, TD : Touchdown

==== Special teams ====
Kicking statistics
#	NAME	POS	XPM	XPA	XP%	FGM	FGA	FG%	1–19	20–29	30–39	40–49	50+	LNG
45	Bert Auburn	K	56	56	100.0%	29	35	82.9%	0/0	8/9	10/10	9/12	2/4	54
	TOTALS		56	56	100.0%	29	35	82.9%	0/0	8/9	10/10	9/12	2/4	54

Kickoff statistics
#	NAME	POS	KICKS	YDS	AVG	TB	OB
15	Will Stone	K	96	6,130	63.9	49	1
27	Ryan Sanborn	P	1	65	65.0	1	0
	TOTALS		97	6,195	63.9	50	1

Punting statistics
#	NAME	POS	PUNTS	YDS	AVG	LONG	TB	I–20	50+	BLK
27	Ryan Sanborn	P	40	1,828	45.7	64	2	15	15	0
	TOTALS		41	1,828	44.5	64	2	15	15	1

Kick return statistics
#	NAME	POS	RTNS	YDS	AVG	TD	LNG
7	Keilan Robinson	RB	22	494	22.5	1	95
23	Jaydon Blue	RB	3	80	26.7	0	31
17	Savion Red	RB	2	29	14.5	0	21
13	Jordan Whittington	WR	2	18	9.0	0	14
11	DeAndre Moore Jr.	WR	1	15	15.0	0	15
43	Jett Bush	LB	1	0	0.0	0	0
	TOTALS		31	636	20.5	1	95

Punt return statistics
#	NAME	POS	RTNS	YDS	AVG	TD	LONG
1	Xavier Worthy	WR	22	371	16.9	1	74
16	Michael Taafe	DB	1	12	12.0	0	12
21	Kitan Crawford	DB	1	7	7.0	0	7
13	Jordan Whittington	WR	1	3	3.0	0	3
5	Malik Muhammad	DB	0	0	0.0	1	0
	TOTALS		25	393	15.7	2	74

== Rankings ==
Ranking movements Legend: ██ Increase in ranking ██ Decrease in ranking т = Tied with team above or below ( ) = First-place votes
	Week															
Poll	Pre	1	2	3	4	5	6	7	8	9	10	11	12	13	14	Final
AP	11	11	4 (2)	3 (3)	3 (2)	3 (10)	9	8	7	7	7	7	7	7	3	3
Coaches	12	10	6	6	5	4 (1)	11	8т	7	6	7	7	7	7	4т	4
CFP	Not released									7	7	7	7	7	3	Not released
