= 2023 All-Big 12 Conference football team =

The 2023 All-Big 12 Conference football team consists of American football players chosen as All-Big 12 Conference players for the 2023 Big 12 Conference football season. The conference recognizes two official All-Big 12 selectors: (1) the Big 12 conference coaches selected separate offensive and defensive units and named first- and second-team players (the "Coaches" team); and (2) a panel of sports writers and broadcasters covering the Big 12 also selected offensive and defensive units and named first- and second-team players (the "Media" team).

== Offensive selections ==
=== Quarterbacks ===
- Dillon Gabriel, Oklahoma (Coaches-1; Media-1)
- Will Howard, Kansas State (Coaches-2)
- Quinn Ewers, Texas (Media-2)

=== Running backs ===
- Tahj Brooks, Texas Tech (Coaches-1; Media-1)
- Ollie Gordon II, Oklahoma State (Coaches-1; Media-1)
- Jonathon Brooks, Texas (Coaches-2; Media-2)
- Devin Neal, Kansas (Coaches-2; Media-2)

=== Fullbacks ===
- Ben Sinnott, Kansas State (Coaches-1)
- Stevo Klotz, Iowa State (Coaches-2)

=== Centers ===
- Zach Frazier, West Virginia (Coaches-1; Media-1)
- Andrew Raym, Oklahoma (Coaches-2; Media-2)

=== Guards ===
- Cooper Beebe, Kansas State (Coaches-1; Media-1)
- Luke Kandra, Cincinnati (Coaches-2; Media-1)

=== Tackles ===
- Patrick Paul, Houston (Coaches-1; Media-1)
- Dominick Puni, Kansas (Coaches-1; Media-1)
- Kelvin Banks Jr., Texas (Coaches-1; Media-2)

=== Tight ends ===
- Ben Sinnott, Kansas State (Media-1)
- Jared Wiley, TCU (Coaches-1; Media-2)
- Ja'Tavion Sanders, Texas (Coaches-1)
- Kole Taylor, West Virginia (Coaches-2)

=== Receivers ===
- Drake Stoops, Oklahoma (Coaches-1; Media-1)
- Xavier Worthy, Texas (Coaches-1; Media-1)
- Javon Baker, UCF (Coaches-1; Media-2)
- Adonai Mitchell, Texas (Coaches-2; Media-2)
- Brennan Presley, Oklahoma State (Coaches-2)

== Defensive selections ==
=== Defensive linemen ===
- Austin Booker, Kansas (Coaches-1; Media-1)
- Tre'Mon Morris-Brash, UCF (Coaches-1; Media-1)
- Byron Murphy II, Texas (Coaches-1; Media-1)
- T'Vondre Sweat, Texas (Coaches-1; Media-1)
- Nelson Ceaser, Houston (Coaches-1; Media-2)
- Tyler Batty, BYU (Coaches-2; Media-2)
- Jamaree Caldwell, Houston (Coaches-2; Media-2)
- Dontay Corleone, Cincinnati (Coaches-2; Media-2)
- Ethan Downs, Oklahoma (Coaches-2)
- Khalid Duke, Kansas State (Coaches-2)

=== Linebackers ===
- Danny Stutsman, Oklahoma (Coaches-1; Media-1)
- Nickolas Martin, Oklahoma State (Coaches-1; Media-1)
- Jaylan Ford, Texas (Coaches-1; Media-1)
- Jason Johnson, UCF (Coaches-2; Media-2)
- Austin Moore, Kansas State (Coaches-2)
- Collin Oliver, Oklahoma State (Coaches-2; Media-2)
- Ben Roberts, Texas Tech (Media-2)

=== Defensive backs ===
- Beanie Bishop, West Virginia (Coaches-1; Media-1)
- Billy Bowman Jr., Oklahoma (Coaches-1; Media-1)
- Jeremiah Cooper, Iowa State (Coaches-1; Media-1)
- T. J. Tampa, Iowa State (Coaches-1; Media-1)
- Cobee Bryant, Kansas (Coaches-1; Media-2)
- Josh Newton, TCU (Coaches-2; Media-2)
- Dadrion Taylor-Demerson, Texas Tech (Coaches-2; Media-2)
- Jahdae Barron, Texas (Coaches-2)
- Beau Freyler, Iowa State (Media-2)
- Kenny Logan Jr., Kansas (Coaches-2)
- Kobe Savage, Kansas State (Coaches-2)

== Special teams ==
=== Kickers ===
- Bert Auburn, Texas (Coaches-1; Media-1)
- Alex Hale, Oklahoma State (Coaches-2; Media-2)

=== Punters ===
- Austin McNamara, Texas Tech (Coaches-1; Media-2)
- Ryan Rehkow, BYU (Coaches-2; Media-1)

=== All-purpose / Return specialists ===
- Xavier Worthy, Texas (Coaches-1; Media-1)
- Brennan Presley, Oklahoma State (Media-2)
- Matthew Golden, Houston (Coaches-2)

== Key ==
Bold = selected as a first-team player by both the coaches and media panel

Coaches = selected by Big 12 Conference coaches

Media = selected by a media panel

== See also ==
- 2023 College Football All-America Team
