= Quintrevion Wisner =

American football player (born 2005)

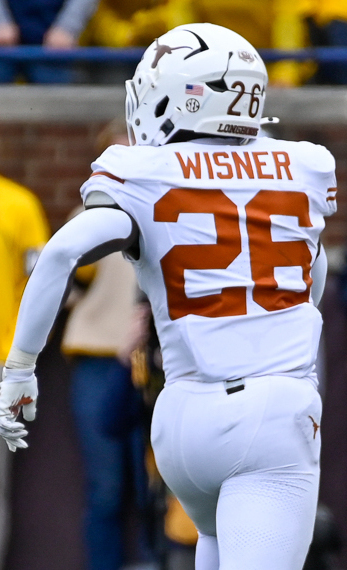
- Wisner in 2024

No. 5 – Florida State Seminoles
- Position: Running back
- Class: Senior

Personal information
- Born: May 9, 2005 (age 21)
- Listed height: 6 ft 0 in (1.83 m)
- Listed weight: 194 lb (88 kg)

Career information
- High school: DeSoto (DeSoto, Texas)
- College: Texas (2023–2025); Florida State (2026–present)

Awards and highlights
- Third-team All-SEC (2024)
- Stats at ESPN

Quintrevion Wisner (born May 9, 2005) is an American college football running back for the Florida State Seminoles. He previously played for the Texas Longhorns.

== Early life ==
Wisner, a Mexia native, attended DeSoto High School in DeSoto, Texas. As a senior, he rushed for 846 yards and six touchdowns on 125 carries and hauled in 35 receptions for 466 yards and four touchdowns as he helped DeSoto to a state championship. Coming out of high school, Wisner was rated as a four-star recruit and committed to play college football for the Texas Longhorns over Oklahoma and Texas A&M.

== College career ==
=== Texas ===
As a freshman, Wisner appeared in all 14 games, mostly on special teams. In the win against Texas Tech, he rushed for 60 yards and scored his first college career touchdown. In the Big 12 Conference championship win against Oklahoma State, Wisner had three carries for 11 yards.

As a sophomore, Wisner appeared in 15 games and started 12 games. He scored his first touchdown of the season in the Week 1 win against Colorado State. Wisner did not play in the Week 4 win against Louisiana–Monroe due to a minor injury. Wisner logged 100+ rushing yards in four separate games. He ended the season with 1,064 rushing yards, five rushing touchdowns, 311 receiving yards, and one receiving touchdown.

As a junior, Wisner was selected to the preseason first team All-SEC and the only returning SEC running back with over 1,000 yards. He was also named to the Doak Walker Award, Maxwell Award, and Earl Campbell Tyler Rose Award watchlists. In the season opener against Ohio State, Wisner had 16 carries for 80 yards and one kick return for 15 yards. He then missed the next three games due to an injury. In the Red River Rivalry game against Oklahoma, Wisner had 22 carries for 94 yards and five receptions for 22 yards. In Week 14 against Texas A&M, he had 19 carries for 155 yards and two receptions for 19 yards. At the end of the season, Wisner entered the NCAA transfer portal.

=== Florida State ===
On January 5, 2026, Wisner transferred to Florida State.

=== College statistics ===
Year	Team	Games		Rushing				Receiving				Kick returns		
Year	Team	GP	GS	Att	Yards	Avg	TD	Rec	Yards	Avg	TD	Att	Yards	TD
2023	Texas	14	0	12	73	6.1	1	0	0	0.0	0	0	0	0
2024	Texas	15	12	226	1,064	4.7	5	44	311	7.1	1	0	0	0
2025	Texas	9	9	131	597	4.6	3	22	146	6.6	1	1	15	0
2026	Florida State	0	0	0	0	0.0	0	0	0	0.0	0	0	0	0
Career		38	21	369	1,734	4.7	9	66	457	6.9	2	1	15	0
