= Colton Vasek =

American football player

No. 92 – Texas Longhorns
- Position: EDGE
- Class: Redshirt Junior

Personal information
- Listed height: 6 ft 5 in (1.96 m)
- Listed weight: 260 lb (118 kg)

Career information
- High school: Westlake (Austin, Texas)
- College: Texas (2023–present)
- Stats at ESPN

Colton Vasek is an American college football defensive end for the Texas Longhorns.

== Early life ==
Vasek grew up in Austin, Texas and attended Westlake High School. He had 71 tackles and 14 sacks as a senior. Vasek was rated a four-star recruit and initially committed to play college football at Oklahoma over offers from Oregon, Texas, and Texas Tech. He later flipped his commitment to Texas.

== College career ==
In 2023, Vasek suffered a back injury before the start of his freshman season with the Texas Longhorns and redshirted that year. In 2024 as a redshirt freshman, Vasek played in 11 games and had seven tackles and two sacks. In 2025, Vasek played in 12 games and had three tackles. Before the start of the 2026 season, Vasek was moved from EDGE to SAM linebacker.

=== College statistics ===
| Year | Team | GP | Tackles | | | | | Interceptions | | | | Fumbles | | | |
| Year | Team | GP | Solo | Ast | Cmb | TfL | Sck | Int | Yds | TD | PD | FR | Yds | TD | FF |
|---|---|---|---|---|---|---|---|---|---|---|---|---|---|---|---|
| 2023 | Texas | 0 | 0 | 0 | 0 | 0 | 0 | 0 | 0 | 0 | 0 | 0 | 0 | 0 | 0 |
| 2024 | Texas | 11 | 4 | 3 | 7 | 2.5 | 2.0 | 0 | 0 | 0 | 0 | 0 | 0 | 0 | 0 |
| 2025 | Texas | 12 | 2 | 1 | 3 | 0 | 0 | 0 | 0 | 0 | 0 | 0 | 0 | 0 | 0 |
| Career | | 23 | 6 | 4 | 10 | 2.5 | 2.0 | 0 | 0 | 0 | 0 | 0 | 0 | 0 | 0 |

== Personal life ==
Vasek's father, Brian, played college football at Texas from 1991 to 1995. His younger brother, Connor, currently plays defensive end at Westlake and is committed to play college football at Air Force.
