= T'Vondre Sweat =

American football player (born 2001)

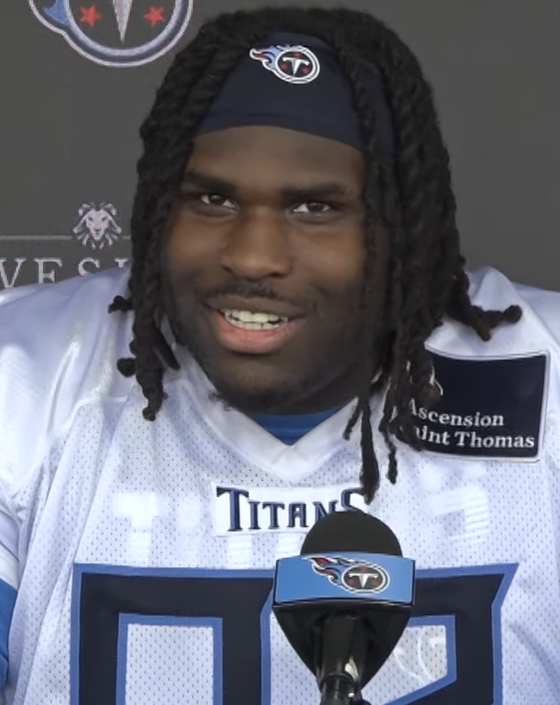
- Sweat with the Tennessee Titans in 2024

No. 99 – New York Jets
- Position: Nose tackle
- Roster status: Injured reserve

Personal information
- Born: July 11, 2001 (age 25); Huntsville, Texas, U.S.
- Listed height: 6 ft 4 in (1.93 m)
- Listed weight: 366 lb (166 kg)

Career information
- High school: Huntsville
- College: Texas (2019–2023)
- NFL draft: 2024: 2nd round, 38th overall pick

Career history
- Tennessee Titans (2024–2025); New York Jets (2026–present)

Awards and highlights
- PFWA All-Rookie Team (2024); Outland Trophy (2023); Unanimous All-American (2023); Big 12 Defensive Player of the Year (2023); First-team All-Big 12 (2023)

Career NFL statistics as of Week 7, 2026
- Total tackles: 102
- Sacks: 3
- Forced fumbles: 1
- Fumble recoveries: 1
- Pass deflections: 2
- Stats at Pro Football Reference

T'Vondre Sweat (born July 11, 2001) is an American professional football nose tackle for the New York Jets of the National Football League (NFL). He played college football for the Texas Longhorns, winning the Outland Trophy and receiving unanimous All-American honors in 2023.

== Early life ==
Sweat was born on July 11, 2001 in Huntsville, Texas. He attended Huntsville High School where he played basketball and football. He was rated a three-star recruit and committed to play college football at the University of Texas at Austin.

== College career ==
Sweat played in all 13 of the Longhorns' games as a freshman. He recorded 22 tackles, four tackles for loss, one sack, and one pass broken up with one forced fumble and one fumble recovery as a sophomore. Sweat had 22 tackles, two tackles for loss, and one sack during his junior season. As a senior he was named honorable mention All-Big 12 Conference after finishing the year with 30 tackles, 2.5 tackles for loss, seven quarterback hurries, and four passes defended. In 2023, Sweat won the Outland Trophy and was named a unanimous All-American on a defensive line that also included Big 12 Defensive Lineman of the Year winner Byron Murphy II.

== Professional career ==
Pre-draft measurables
| Height | Weight | Arm length | Hand span | Wingspan | 40-yard dash | 10-yard split | 20-yard split | Vertical jump | Broad jump |
|---|---|---|---|---|---|---|---|---|---|
| 6 ft 4 1/2 in (1.94 m) | 366 lb (166 kg) | 33 1/4 in (0.84 m) | 10 1/8 in (0.26 m) | 6 ft 9 1/4 in (2.06 m) | 5.27 s | 1.80 s | 3.03 s | 26.0 in (0.66 m) | 8 ft 2 in (2.49 m) |
All values from NFL Combine

=== Tennessee Titans ===
Sweat was selected by the Tennessee Titans in the second round with the 38th overall pick in the 2024 NFL draft. They signed him to a 4-year, $9.8 million contract.

Sweat made an early impact as the Titans' starting nose tackle for the 2024 season, making his NFL debut on Week 1 against the Chicago Bears. He made his first career sack against C. J. Stroud on a Week 12 road win against the Houston Texans. Later during Week 15's game against the Cincinnati Bengals, Sweat recorded his first forced fumble and fumble recovery, stripping the ball from quarterback Joe Burrow and making a wildly celebrated 30 yard return. Sweat played all 17 games during his rookie season. He made 16 starts, and finished with 51 total tackles, seven pressures, one sack, and a forced fumble. Sweat was named to the PFWA All-Rookie Team.

In Week 1 of 2025 against the Denver Broncos, Sweat injured his ankle, causing him to miss Week 2 against the Los Angeles Rams. He then re-injured himself before Week 3's game against the Indianapolis Colts and was placed on injured reserve ahead of the game. Sweat was activated on October 18.

=== New York Jets ===
On March 12, 2026, Sweat was traded to the New York Jets in exchange for Jermaine Johnson II.

== Career statistics ==
=== NFL ===
Legend
| **Bold** | Career high |

| Year | Team | Games | | Tackles | | | | | Interceptions | | | | Fumbles | | | |
| Year | Team | GP | GS | Cmb | Solo | Ast | Sck | TFL | PD | Int | Yds | TD | FF | FR | Yds | TD |
|---|---|---|---|---|---|---|---|---|---|---|---|---|---|---|---|---|
| 2024 | TEN | 17 | 16 | **51** | **22** | **29** | 1.0 | **4** | **1** | 0 | 0 | 0 | **1** | **1** | **30** | 0 |
| 2025 | TEN | 12 | 12 | 34 | 16 | 18 | **2.0** | **4** | **1** | 0 | 0 | 0 | 0 | 0 | 0 | 0 |
| 2026 | NYJ | 7 | 6 | 17 | 5 | 12 | 0.0 | 2 | 0 | 0 | 0 | 0 | 0 | 0 | 0 | 0 |
| Career | | 36 | 34 | 102 | 43 | 59 | 3.0 | 10 | 2 | 0 | 0 | 0 | 1 | 1 | 30 | 0 |

=== College ===
| Year | Team | GP | Tackles | | | | | Interceptions | | | | | Fumbles | | | |
| Year | Team | GP | Solo | Ast | Cmb | TfL | Sck | Int | Yds | Avg | TD | PD | FR | Yds | TD | FF |
|---|---|---|---|---|---|---|---|---|---|---|---|---|---|---|---|---|
| 2019 | Texas | 13 | 4 | 5 | 9 | 1 | 1.0 | 0 | 0 | 0 | 0 | 2 | **1** | **11** | 0 | 0 |
| 2020 | Texas | 10 | 6 | 16 | 22 | 4 | 1.0 | 0 | 0 | 0 | 0 | 1 | **1** | 0 | 0 | **1** |
| 2021 | Texas | 12 | 9 | 13 | 22 | 2 | 1.0 | 0 | 0 | 0 | 0 | 3 | 0 | 0 | 0 | 0 |
| 2022 | Texas | 13 | 10 | 20 | 30 | 3 | 0.0 | 0 | 0 | 0 | 0 | **4** | 0 | 0 | 0 | 0 |
| 2023 | Texas | 14 | **18** | **27** | **45** | **8** | **2.0** | 0 | 0 | 0 | 0 | **4** | 0 | 0 | 0 | 0 |
| Career | | 62 | 47 | 81 | 128 | 18 | 5.0 | 0 | 0 | 0 | 0 | 14 | 2 | 11 | 0 | 1 |

== Personal life ==
On April 7, 2024, Sweat was arrested in Austin, Texas for DWI. He was released from jail on a $3,000 bond.
