= Anthony Hill Jr. =

American football player (born 2005)

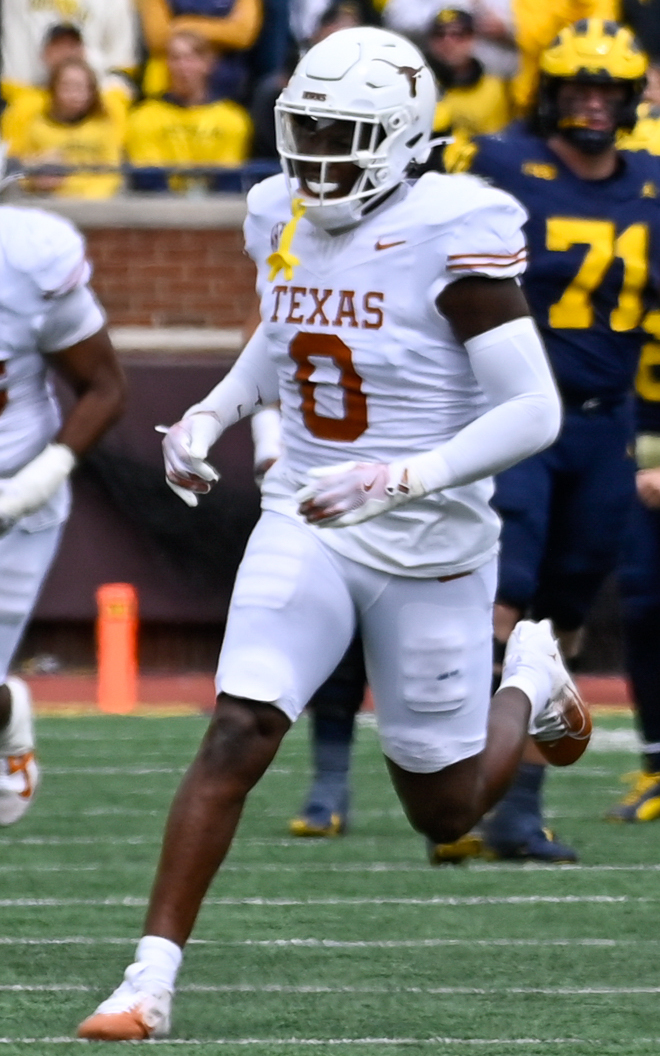
- Hill with the Texas Longhorns in 2024

No. 53 – Tennessee Titans
- Position: Linebacker
- Roster status: Active

Personal information
- Born: February 14, 2005 (age 21); Wichita, Kansas, U.S.
- Listed height: 6 ft 2 in (1.88 m)
- Listed weight: 238 lb (108 kg)

Career information
- High school: Billy Ryan (Denton, Texas)
- College: Texas (2023–2025)
- NFL draft: 2026: 2nd round, 60th overall pick

Career history
- Tennessee Titans (2026–present)

Awards and highlights
- 2× Second-team All-American (2024, 2025); 2× First-team All-SEC (2024, 2025); Freshman All-American (2023); Big 12 Defensive Freshman of the Year (2023)

Career NFL statistics as of Week 8, 2026
- Tackles: 82
- Forced fumbles: 1
- Pass deflections: 3
- Stats at Pro Football Reference

Anthony Hill Jr. (born February 14, 2005) is an American professional football linebacker for the Tennessee Titans of the National Football League (NFL). He played college football for the Texas Longhorns and was selected by the Titans in the second round of the 2026 NFL draft.

== Early life ==
Hill was born on February 14, 2005, in Wichita, Kansas, and grew up in Denton, Texas. He attended Billy Ryan High School, where he played football and competed in the triple jump and the 4 × 400 metres relay. In his first varsity season, he recorded 105 tackles with 11 tackles for loss and three sacks. Hill was named the MVP of District 5-5A and the All-Area Defensive Player of the Year by the Denton Record-Chronicle as a junior after making 131 tackles with 18 tackles for loss and eight sacks. He played in only six games during his senior season due to injury and had 67 tackles, four tackles for loss, two sacks, and five forced fumbles. After the season Hill played in the 2023 All-American Bowl.

Hill was rated a five-star recruit and was ranked as the top linebacker in his class nationally by several major recruiting services. He initially committed to play college football at Texas A&M. Hill later decommitted and reopened his recruitment during his senior football season. He ultimately chose to sign with Texas.

== College career ==
=== 2023 season ===
Hill joined the Longhorns as an early enrollee at the University of Texas at Austin in January 2023 in order to take part in the team's spring practices. As a freshman, Hill appeared in 14 games with six starts. He totaled 67 tackles, eight tackles for a loss, five sacks, two pass deflections, and one forced fumble. At the end of the season, he was named Big 12 Defensive Freshman of the Year and Freshman All-American.

=== 2024 season ===
As a sophomore, Hill played and started in all 16 games. Throughout the season, he logged 113 tackles, eight sacks, one interception, and four forced fumbles. Hill was the only Texas defender with 100+ tackles on the season. At the end of the season, Hill was named a first team All-American and first team All-SEC.

=== 2025 season ===
Prior to the season, Hill was named to the Lott Trophy, Bronko Nagurski Trophy, Butkus Award, Walter Camp Award, Chuck Bednarik Award, and Lombardi Award watchlists. He was also named to the preseason All-SEC first team and preseason All-American first team. In Week 2 against Sam Houston State, Hill recorded two forced fumbles. In Week 6 against Florida, he recorded 14 tackles and recovered one fumble for 21 yards. After Week 7, Hill was selected to the midseason watch list for the Lombardi Award. In Week 9 against Mississippi State, Hill recorded 2.5 sacks, 10 tackles, and one forced fumble. For his performance, he was named SEC Co-Defensive Player of the Week, Chuck Bednarik Player of the Week, and Walter Camp Defensive Player of the Week. On November 11, he was named a Chuck Bednarik Award semifinalist. In the game against Georgia, Hill suffered a hand injury and missed the last two games of the season. On November 25, he was named a Butkus Award finalist. At the end of the season, Hill was named to the All-SEC second team.

On December 8, Hill declared for the NFL draft, forgoing his senior year.

=== Statistics ===
College statistics
Year	Team	GP	Tackles					Interceptions					Fumbles			
Year	Team	GP	Solo	Ast	Cmb	TfL	Sck	Int	Yds	Avg	TD	PD	FR	Yds	TD	FF
2023	Texas	14	40	27	67	8.0	5.0	0	0	0.0	0	2	0	0	0	1
2024	Texas	16	59	54	113	16.5	8.0	1	32	32.0	0	1	1	25	0	4
2025	Texas	10	37	32	69	7.0	4.0	2	3	1.5	0	1	1	21	0	3
Career		40	136	113	249	31.5	17.0	3	35	11.7	0	4	2	46	0	8

== Professional career ==
Pre-draft measurables
Height	Weight	Arm length	Hand span	Wingspan	40-yard dash	10-yard split	20-yard split	Vertical jump	Broad jump	Bench press
6 ft 2 in (1.88 m)	238 lb (108 kg)	32 3/8 in (0.82 m)	9 5/8 in (0.24 m)	6 ft 7 in (2.01 m)	4.51 s	1.58 s	2.63 s	37.0 in (0.94 m)	10 ft 5 in (3.18 m)	21 reps
All values from NFL Combine

Hill was selected by the Tennessee Titans in the second round with the 60th overall pick in the 2026 NFL draft. He signed his four-year rookie contract worth $8.11 million.

Hill made his NFL debut in Week 1 as a starting linebacker against the New York Jets, recording a game-high 16 tackles and two pass deflections. He was also named Defensive Rookie of the Month for September.
