= Jonathon Brooks (American football) =

American football player (born 2003)

No. 25 – Carolina Panthers
- Position: Running back
- Roster status: Injured reserve

Personal information
- Born: July 21, 2003 (age 23); Hallettsville, Texas, U.S.
- Listed height: 6 ft 0 in (1.83 m)
- Listed weight: 216 lb (98 kg)

Career information
- High school: Hallettsville
- College: Texas (2021–2023)
- NFL draft: 2024: 2nd round, 46th overall pick

Career history
- Carolina Panthers (2024–present)

Awards and highlights
- Second-team All-Big 12 (2023)

Career NFL statistics as of Week 3, 2026
- Rushing yards: 52
- Rushing average: 2.9
- Receptions: 5
- Receiving yards: 66
- Stats at Pro Football Reference

Jonathon Brooks (born July 21, 2003) is an American professional football running back for the Carolina Panthers of the National Football League (NFL). He played college football for the Texas Longhorns, earning second-team All-Big 12 honors in 2023. The Panthers selected him 46th overall in the second round of the 2024 NFL draft, making him the first running back drafted that year.

After appearing in three games as a rookie, Brooks missed the 2025 season while recovering from a second tear of the anterior cruciate ligament in his right knee and returned to game action in 2026.

== Early life ==
Brooks was born on July 21, 2003, in Hallettsville, Texas, and attended Hallettsville High School. As a senior in 2020, he rushed for 3,530 yards and 62 touchdowns on 295 carries, helping Hallettsville reach the Class 3A Division I state championship game for the first time in school history. He was named the 2020 Mr. Texas Football High School Player of the Year. Brooks committed to play college football at the University of Texas at Austin.

== College career ==
As a true freshman at Texas in 2021, Brooks appeared in four games and rushed 21 times for 143 yards and one touchdown. In 2022, he played in seven games as a reserve behind Bijan Robinson and Roschon Johnson, finishing with 197 rushing yards and five touchdowns on 30 carries.

After Robinson and Johnson entered the NFL, Brooks emerged as Texas's lead running back in 2023 and recorded six 100-yard rushing games. On September 30, he rushed 21 times for a career-high 218 yards and two touchdowns in a victory over No. 24 Kansas. Brooks tore the ACL in his right knee during the fourth quarter of a November 11 victory over TCU, after rushing for 104 yards and two touchdowns and recording 74 receiving yards. The injury sidelined him for the remainder of the season apart from a ceremonial appearance for the final kneel-down of the Big 12 Championship Game, which gave him an official 11th appearance.

Brooks finished his redshirt sophomore season with 187 carries for 1,139 yards and 10 touchdowns, along with 25 receptions for 286 yards and one touchdown. He earned second-team All-Big 12 honors and was named a semifinalist for the Doak Walker Award and a finalist for the Earl Campbell Tyler Rose Award. In January 2024, Brooks declared for the 2024 NFL draft.

== Professional career ==
Pre-draft measurables
Height	Weight	Arm length	Hand span	Wingspan
6 ft 0 3/8 in (1.84 m)	216 lb (98 kg)	31 1/2 in (0.80 m)	9 1/4 in (0.23 m)	6 ft 3 7/8 in (1.93 m)
All values from NFL Combine

Brooks was selected by the Carolina Panthers in the second round, 46th overall, of the 2024 NFL draft, making him the first running back selected that year. Carolina acquired the pick from the Indianapolis Colts in exchange for the 52nd, 142nd and 155th overall selections.

Brooks began his rookie season on the reserve/non-football injury list while recovering from the torn ACL he sustained at Texas. He was activated on November 6, 2024, and made his NFL debut against the Kansas City Chiefs on November 24, rushing twice for seven yards. In his third career game, against the Philadelphia Eagles in Week 14, Brooks suffered a non-contact injury on his first carry and tore the ACL in his right knee for a second time, ending his season. He finished his rookie season with three appearances, one start, nine carries for 22 yards and three receptions for 23 yards.

On May 8, 2025, Brooks was placed on the physically unable to perform list, ruling him out for the 2025 season. He was cleared to participate without limitations in the Panthers' 2026 offseason program.

On August 15, 2026, Brooks returned to game action in a preseason contest against the Buffalo Bills, recording four touches for 14 yards from scrimmage. On September 23, Brooks was placed on injured reserve after suffering a core muscle injury.

== Personal life ==
Brooks is a Christian. He was baptized in April 2026.

== Career statistics ==
=== NFL ===
Legend
**Bold**	Career best

Year	Team	Games		Rushing					Receiving					Fumbles	
Year	Team	GP	GS	Att	Yds	Y/A	Lng	TD	Rec	Yds	Y/R	Lng	TD	Fum	Lost
2024	CAR	**3**	**1**	**9**	**22**	**2.4**	**9**	**0**	**3**	**23**	**7.7**	**18**	**0**	**0**	**0**
2025	CAR	0	0	Did not play due to injury											
Career		**3**	**1**	**9**	**22**	**2.4**	**9**	**0**	**3**	**23**	**7.7**	**18**	**0**	**0**	**0**

=== College ===
Legend
**Bold**	Career best

Year	Team	Games		Rushing				Receiving			
Year	Team	GP	GS	Att	Yards	Avg	TD	Rec	Yards	Avg	TD
2021	Texas	4	0	21	143	**6.8**	1	1	12	12.0	0
2022	Texas	7	0	30	197	6.6	5	2	37	**18.5**	**1**
2023	Texas	**11**	**8**	**187**	**1,139**	6.1	**10**	**25**	**286**	11.4	**1**
Career		22	8	238	1,479	6.2	16	28	335	12.0	2
