= Byron Murphy II =

American football player (born 2002)

No. 91 – Seattle Seahawks
- Position: Nose tackle
- Roster status: Active

Personal information
- Born: September 8, 2002 (age 24); DeSoto, Texas, U.S.
- Listed height: 6 ft 0 in (1.83 m)
- Listed weight: 306 lb (139 kg)

Career information
- High school: DeSoto
- College: Texas (2021–2023)
- NFL draft: 2024: 1st round, 16th overall pick

Career history
- Seattle Seahawks (2024–present)

Awards and highlights
- Super Bowl champion (LX); Big 12 Defensive Lineman of the Year (2023); Second-team All-American (2023); First-team All-Big 12 (2023)

Career NFL statistics as of Week 7, 2026
- Tackles: 122
- Sacks: 10.5
- Stats at Pro Football Reference

Byron Murphy II (born September 8, 2002) is an American professional football nose tackle for the Seattle Seahawks of the National Football League (NFL). He played college football for the Texas Longhorns and was named the Big 12 Defensive Lineman of the Year in 2023. Murphy was selected by the Seahawks in the first round of the 2024 NFL draft.

== Early life ==
Murphy II attended DeSoto High School in DeSoto, Texas. As a senior, he had 79 tackles and 14 sacks. He originally committed to play college football at Baylor University before changing to the University of Texas at Austin.

== College career ==
As a true freshman at Texas in 2021, Murphy II played in all 12 games with one start and had 15 tackles and two sacks. As a sophomore he started one of 13 games and recorded 26 tackles and one sack. Murphy II became a starter as a junior in 2023, being named the Big 12 Defensive Lineman of the Year alongside Outland Trophy winner T'Vondre Sweat. Against Wyoming, he had a receiving touchdown.

== Professional career ==
Pre-draft measurables
Height	Weight	Arm length	Hand span	Wingspan	40-yard dash	10-yard split	20-yard split	20-yard shuttle	Three-cone drill	Vertical jump	Broad jump	Bench press
6 ft 0 1/2 in (1.84 m)	297 lb (135 kg)	32 3/8 in (0.82 m)	10 1/4 in (0.26 m)	6 ft 5 1/8 in (1.96 m)	4.87 s	1.69 s	2.83 s	4.50 s	7.50 s	33.0 in (0.84 m)	9 ft 3 in (2.82 m)	28 reps
All values from NFL Combine/Pro Day

Murphy was selected by the Seattle Seahawks in the first round, 16th overall, of the 2024 NFL draft. He signed a 4-year, $16,083,122 rookie contract with the Seahawks. After a hamstring injury in Week 3 against the Miami Dolphins, Murphy was out for the following 3 games. In his rookie season, he played in 14 games with 9 starts, recording 0.5 sacks, 36 tackles, two TFL's and a QB Hit.

In Week 2 of the 2025 season, Murphy recorded 1.5 sacks in a 31–17 road win over the Pittsburgh Steelers. In the Super Bowl win against the New England Patriots, he recorded two sacks and one fumble recovery.

== Career statistics ==
=== NFL ===
Legend
	Won the Super Bowl
**Bold**	Career high

==== Regular season ====
Year	Team	Games		Tackles					Fumbles				Interceptions			
Year	Team	GP	GS	Cmb	Solo	Ast	Sck	TFL	FF	FR	Yds	TD	Int	Yds	TD	PD
2024	SEA	14	9	36	12	24	0.5	2	0	0	0	0	0	0	0	0
2025	SEA	17	17	**62**	**22**	**40**	**7.0**	**7**	0	0	0	0	0	0	0	0
2026	SEA	7	7	24	12	12	3.0	5	0	0	0	0	0	0	0	0
Career		38	33	122	46	76	10.5	14	0	0	0	0	0	0	0	0

==== Postseason ====
Year	Team	Games		Tackles					Fumbles				Interceptions			
Year	Team	GP	GS	Cmb	Solo	Ast	Sck	TFL	FF	FR	Yds	TD	Int	Yds	TD	PD
2025	SEA	3	3	9	6	3	2.0	2	0	1	0	0	0	0	0	0
Career		3	3	9	6	3	2.0	2	0	1	0	0	0	0	0	0

=== College ===
Year	Team	GP	Tackles					Interceptions					Fumbles			
Year	Team	GP	Solo	Ast	Cmb	TfL	Sck	Int	Yds	Avg	TD	PD	FR	Yds	TD	FF
2021	Texas	12	10	5	15	4	2.0	0	0	0.0	0	0	0	0	0	0
2022	Texas	13	9	**17**	26	3	1.0	0	0	0.0	0	0	0	0	0	0
2023	Texas	14	**13**	16	**29**	**9**	**5.0**	0	0	0.0	0	0	0	0	0	0
Career		39	32	38	70	16	8.0	0	0	0.0	0	0	0	0	0	0

== Personal life ==
Murphy proposed to his girlfriend, Maya Hurd on June 28, 2024.
