= Christian Jones (offensive lineman) =

American football player (born 2000)

No. 72 – Chicago Bears
- Position: Offensive tackle
- Roster status: Practice squad

Personal information
- Born: May 12, 2000 (age 26); Houston, Texas, U.S.
- Listed height: 6 ft 5 in (1.96 m)
- Listed weight: 320 lb (145 kg)

Career information
- High school: Cypress Woods (TX)
- College: Texas (2018–2023)
- NFL draft: 2024: 5th round, 162nd overall pick

Career history
- Arizona Cardinals (2024–2025); Chicago Bears (2026–present)*
- * Offseason or practice squad member only

Career NFL statistics as of 2025
- Games played: 4
- Games started: 1
- Stats at Pro Football Reference

Christian Jones (born May 12, 2000) is an American professional football offensive tackle for the Chicago Bears of the National Football League (NFL). He played college football for the Texas Longhorns and was selected by the Arizona Cardinals in the fifth round of the 2024 NFL draft.

== Early life ==
Born in Houston, Texas, Jones grew up playing soccer and did not try out football until his junior year at Cypress Woods High School. He started as a defensive end and posted 17 tackles in 2016, before also playing offensive lineman as a senior in 2017; he was team captain in his last year and was first-team all-district. A three-star recruit, he committed to play college football for the Texas Longhorns after having flipped from the SMU Mustangs.

== College career ==
As a true freshman at Texas in 2018, Jones saw no playing time. He then played 13 games on special teams in 2019. He became a full-time starter in the 2020 season, starting all 10 games, including nine at right tackle and one at left tackle. In 2021, he started all 12 games. Jones then started all 13 games in the 2022 season and was named honorable mention All-Big 12 Conference after helping Bijan Robinson run for 1,580 yards and 18 touchdowns. He returned for a final season in 2023 and started all 13 games, being named honorable mention all-conference and second-team All-Texas by Dave Campbell's Texas Football. He ended his collegiate career with 61 games played, 48 as a starter, and was invited to the Senior Bowl.

== Professional career ==
Pre-draft measurables
Height	Weight	Arm length	Hand span	Wingspan	40-yard dash	10-yard split	20-yard split	20-yard shuttle	Three-cone drill	Bench press
6 ft 5 1/4 in (1.96 m)	305 lb (138 kg)	34 1/2 in (0.88 m)	10 5/8 in (0.27 m)	6 ft 11 5/8 in (2.12 m)	5.04 s	1.78 s	2.94 s	4.75 s	8.00 s	20 reps
All values from NFL Combine/Pro Day

=== Arizona Cardinals ===
Jones was selected 162nd overall by the Arizona Cardinals in the fifth round of the 2024 NFL draft. He was placed on injured reserve on August 27, 2024 with an ankle injury. He was activated on October 23.

Jones was placed on injured reserve on August 26, 2025 after suffering a knee injury in the preseason. He was activated on December 13, ahead of the team's Week 15 matchup against the Houston Texans.

On August 30, 2026, Jones was waived by Arizona as a part of final roster cuts.

=== Chicago Bears ===
On August 31, 2026, Jones was signed to the Chicago Bears' practice squad.
