= Bert Auburn =

American football player

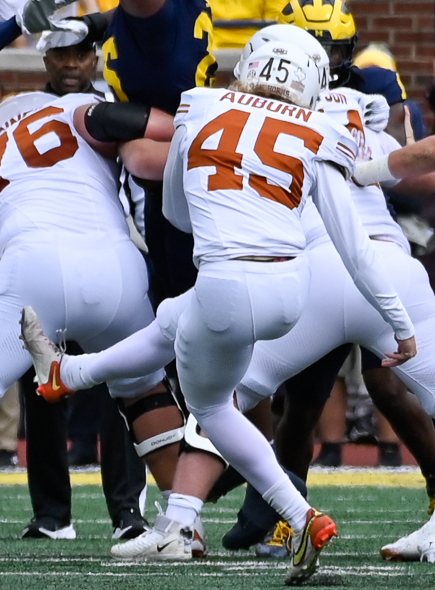
- Auburn with Texas in 2024

No. 45 – Miami Hurricanes
- Position: Placekicker
- Class: Fifth Year

Personal information
- Listed height: 6 ft 0 in (1.83 m)
- Listed weight: 185 lb (84 kg)

Career information
- High school: Flower Mound (Flower Mound, Texas)
- College: Texas (2021–2024); Miami (FL) (2025)

Awards and highlights
- First-team All-Big 12 (2023)
- Stats at ESPN

Bert Auburn is an American college football kicker for the Miami Hurricanes. He previously played for the Texas Longhorns.

== Early life ==
Auburn attended Flower Mound High School in Flower Mound, Texas. He committed to play college football for the Texas Longhorns, joining the team as a preferred walk-on.

== College career ==
=== Texas ===
As a freshman, Auburn attempted just three extra points, converting on all three. In week two of the 2022 season, he made four field goals including a 49-yarder, in a loss to Alabama. In the 2022 season, Auburn took over as the Longhorns kicker where he made all 55 of his extra point attempts, while also going 21 for 26 on his field goals. In 2023, he made all 56 extra points and 29-of-35 field goal attempts. In week ten of the 2023 season, he hit the game-winning field goal in overtime versus Kansas State. In the regular season finale, Auburn set multiple school records in the Longhorns win over Texas Tech for most made field goals in a season, and for the most field goals made consecutively. Heading into the 2024 season, Auburn was placed on scholarship by Texas. In 2024, Auburn became the all-time leader in made field goals at Texas.

On April 17, 2025, Auburn announced that he would enter the transfer portal.

=== Miami (FL) ===
On April 26, 2025, Auburn announced that he would transfer to Miami (FL).
