= Ja'Tavion Sanders =

American football player (born 2003)

No. 0 – Carolina Panthers
- Position: Tight end
- Roster status: Active

Personal information
- Born: March 27, 2003 (age 23); Killeen, Texas, U.S.
- Listed height: 6 ft 4 in (1.93 m)
- Listed weight: 252 lb (114 kg)

Career information
- High school: Billy Ryan (Denton, Texas)
- College: Texas (2021–2023)
- NFL draft: 2024: 4th round, 101st overall pick

Career history
- Carolina Panthers (2024–present)

Awards and highlights
- 2× first-team All-Big 12 (2022, 2023)

Career NFL statistics as of 2025
- Receptions: 62
- Receiving yards: 532
- Receiving touchdowns: 2
- Stats at Pro Football Reference

Ja'Tavion Sanders (born March 27, 2003) is an American professional football tight end for the Carolina Panthers of the National Football League (NFL). He played college football for the Texas Longhorns, earning all-conference honors in 2022 and 2023.

== Early life ==
Sanders grew up in Denton, Texas and attended Billy Ryan High School, where he played basketball and was a wide receiver and defensive end on the football team. He was named first team All-District 4-5A Division 1 at defensive end after recording 39 tackles, 20 tackles for loss, 11 sacks, two forced fumbles, and three passes broken up while also catching 47 passes for 763 yards and 7 touchdowns on offense. Sanders had 63 receptions for 1,161 yards and 16 touchdown receptions with three rushing touchdowns while also recording four sacks and an interception on defense and was named the co-MVP of District 5-5A Division 1. Sanders was rated a five-star recruit as an athlete and committed to play college football at Texas over offers from Alabama, Florida, Florida State, Georgia, LSU, Notre Dame, Ohio State, Oklahoma, and Texas A&M.

== College career ==
Sanders joined the Texas Longhorns as an early enrollee in 2021 and played on both offense and defense during preseason practices. The team's coaching staff ultimately decided that he would play tight end. Sanders played in all 12 of the Texas's games during his freshman season, primarily on special teams. Sanders entered his sophomore season as the Longhorns' primary tight end after transfer Jahleel Billingsley was suspended for the team's first six games. Sanders was twice-named All-Big 12 before declaring for the 2024 NFL draft following the team's loss in the 2024 Sugar Bowl.

== Professional career ==
Pre-draft measurables
Height	Weight	Arm length	Hand span	Wingspan	40-yard dash	10-yard split	20-yard split	20-yard shuttle	Vertical jump	Broad jump	Bench press
6 ft 3 7/8 in (1.93 m)	245 lb (111 kg)	32 7/8 in (0.84 m)	10 1/8 in (0.26 m)	6 ft 6 1/4 in (1.99 m)	4.69 s	1.59 s	2.70 s	4.32 s	30.0 in (0.76 m)	9 ft 6 in (2.90 m)	8 reps
All values from NFL Combine/Pro Day

Sanders was selected in the fourth round with the 101st overall pick by the Carolina Panthers in the 2024 NFL draft. As a rookie, he played in 16 games and started eight games, finishing with 33 receptions for 342 yards and one touchdown. He scored his first NFL career touchdown in Week 10 against the New York Giants.

At the start of the 2025 season, Sanders was listed as the starting tight end in the first unofficial depth chart. He started in the first three games, catching 11 receptions for 92 yards. In Week 4 against the New England Patriots, Sanders was ruled out with an ankle injury sustained in Week 3 against the Atlanta Falcons. In Week 17 against the Seattle Seahawks, Sanders suffered a fractured fibula; he was subsequently placed on season-ending injured reserve on December 31, 2025. Sanders finished the season with 29 catches for 190 yards and one touchdown.

== Career statistics ==
=== NFL ===
Legend
**Bold**	Career best

==== Regular season ====
Year	Team	Games		Receiving					Rushing					Fumbles	
Year	Team	GP	GS	Rec	Yds	Y/R	Lng	TD	Att	Yds	Y/A	Lng	TD	Fum	Lost
2024	CAR	16	8	33	342	10.4	46	1	0	0	0	0	0	1	0
2025	CAR	13	5	29	190	6.6	18	1	0	0	0	0	0	0	0
Career		29	13	62	532	8.6	46	2	0	0	0	0	0	1	0

=== College ===
Year	Team	G	Rec	Yds	Avg	TD
2021	Texas	12	0	0	0.0	0
2022	Texas	13	54	613	11.4	5
2023	Texas	14	45	682	15.2	2
Career		39	99	1,295	13.1	7
