= Earl Campbell Tyler Rose Award =

Annual American college football award

The Earl Campbell Tyler Rose Award is an award given annually to the "top offensive player in Division I football who also exhibits the enduring characteristics that define Earl Campbell: integrity, performance, teamwork, sportsmanship, drive, community and tenacity." The award was established in 2012 by the Tyler Chamber of Commerce in Tyler, Texas and is presented by SPORTyler, Inc., in conjunction with the City of Tyler, the Tyler Convention & Visitors Bureau and Tyler Area Chamber of Commerce. The recipient must have ties to the state of Texas.

== Criteria ==
The award is given to the top offensive player in NCAA Division I football who also exhibits the enduring characteristics that define Earl Campbell: integrity, performance, teamwork, sportsmanship, drive, community and tenacity; specifically tenacity to persist and determination to overcome adversity and injury in pursuit of reaching goals. Additionally, the award is limited to players who were born in the state of Texas, attended a Texas high school, or attended a Texas junior college or university.

== Winners ==
Season	Player	Position	School	Born in TX	High School in TX	College/University in TX
2013	Bryce Petty	QB	Baylor		check	check
2014	Trevone Boykin	QB	TCU	check	check	check
2015	Greg Ward	QB	Houston	check	check	check
2016	D'Onta Foreman	RB	Texas	check	check	check
2017	Baker Mayfield	QB	Oklahoma	check	check	(Note: Mayfield attended Texas Tech before transferring to Oklahoma.)
2018	Kyler Murray	QB	Oklahoma	check	check	(Note: Murray attended Texas A&M before transferring to Oklahoma.)
2019	J. K. Dobbins	RB	Ohio State	check	check	
2020	Kyle Trask	QB	Florida	check	check	
2021	Bailey Zappe	QB	Western Kentucky	check	check	(Note: Zappe attended Houston Baptist University before transferring to Western Kentucky.)
2022	Max Duggan	QB	TCU			check
2023	Ollie Gordon II	RB	Oklahoma State	check	check	
2024	Ashton Jeanty	RB	Boise State		check	
2025	Haynes King	QB	Georgia Tech	check	check	(Note: King attended Texas A&M before transferring to Georgia Tech.)

== Winners by school ==
School	Winners
Oklahoma	2
TCU	2
Baylor	1
Florida	1
Houston	1
Ohio State	1
Oklahoma State	1
Texas	1
Western Kentucky	1
Boise State	1
Georgia Tech	1
