= 2022 Texas Longhorns football team =

American college football season

2022 Texas Longhorns football

Alamo Bowl, L 20–27 vs. Washington
- Conference: Big 12 Conference

Ranking
- Coaches: No. 25
- AP: No. 25
- Record: 8–5 (6–3 Big 12)
- Head coach: Steve Sarkisian (2nd season)
- Offensive coordinator: Kyle Flood (2nd season)
- Defensive coordinator: Pete Kwiatkowski (2nd season)
- Co-defensive coordinator: Jeff Choate (2nd season)
- Home stadium: Darrell K Royal–Texas Memorial Stadium

Uniform
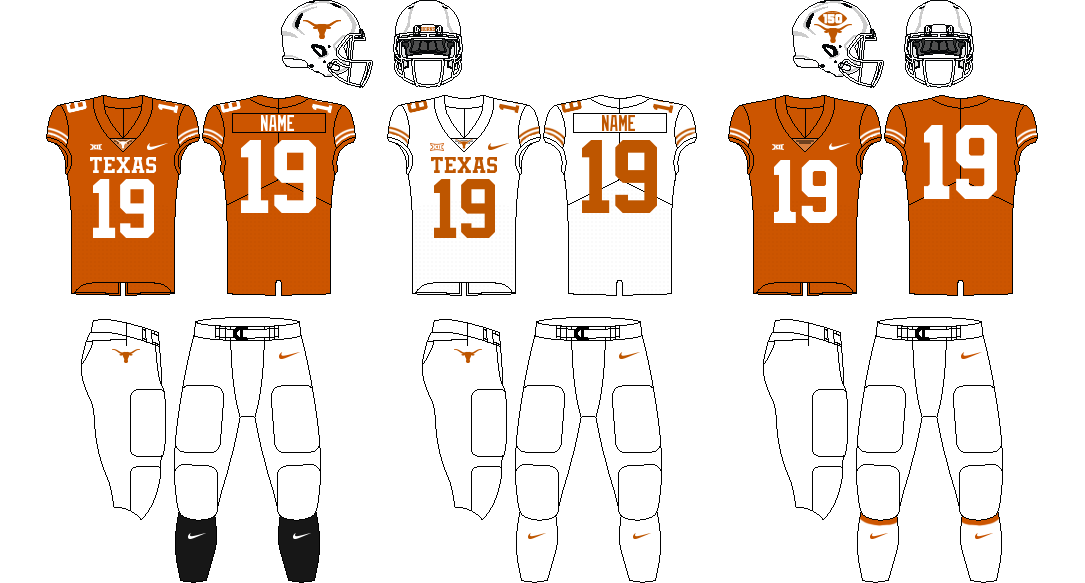

2022 Big 12 Conference football standings
| | Conf. | | | Overall |
| Team | W | | L | W | | L |
|---|---|---|---|---|---|---|
| No. 2 TCU y^ | 9 | – | 0 | 13 | – | 2 |
| No. 14 Kansas State y$ | 7 | – | 2 | 10 | – | 4 |
| No. 25 Texas | 6 | – | 3 | 8 | – | 5 |
| Texas Tech | 5 | – | 4 | 8 | – | 5 |
| Oklahoma State | 4 | – | 5 | 7 | – | 6 |
| Baylor | 4 | – | 5 | 6 | – | 7 |
| Oklahoma | 3 | – | 6 | 6 | – | 7 |
| Kansas | 3 | – | 6 | 6 | – | 7 |
| West Virginia | 3 | – | 6 | 5 | – | 7 |
| Iowa State | 1 | – | 8 | 4 | – | 8 |
Championship: Kansas State 31, TCU 28 ^{OT}
^ – College Football Playoff participant; $ – Conference champion; y – Championship game participant; Rankings from AP Poll

The 2022 Texas Longhorns football team represented the University of Texas at Austin as a member of the Big 12 Conference during the 2022 NCAA Division I FBS football season. Led by second-year head coach Steve Sarkisian, the Longhorns played their home games at Darrell K Royal–Texas Memorial Stadium in Austin, Texas.

== Offseason ==
Positions key
| Offense | Defense | Special teams |
|---|---|---|
| QB — Quarterback; RB — Running back; FB — Fullback; WR — Wide receiver; TE — Tight end; OL — Offensive lineman; T — Tackle; G — Guard; C — Center | DL — Defensive lineman; DT — Defensive tackle (Note: Includes nose tackle (NT)); DE — Defensive end; EDGE — Edge rusher; LB — Linebacker (Note: Includes middle linebacker (MLB/MIKE), weakside linebacker (WILL), strongside linebacker (SAM), off-ball linebacker, and outside linebacker (OLB)); DB — Defensive back; CB — Cornerback; S — Safety (Note: Includes free safety (FS) and strong safety (SS)) | K — Kicker (Note: Also known as a placekicker (PK)); P — Punter; LS — Long snapper; RS — Return specialist (Note: Includes kickoff and punt returners) |

=== Departures ===
Over the course of the off-season, Texas lost 46 total players. 23 players graduated, while the other 24 entered the transfer portal. Of the 47 lost, 16 were starters for multiple games last season including starting quarterback Casey Thompson.

==== Team departures ====
2022 Texas Offseason departures
| Name | Number | Pos. | Height | Weight | Year | Hometown | Notes |
|---|---|---|---|---|---|---|---|
| Jacoby Jones | 3 | LB | 6'4 | 255 | Senior | St. Louis, MO | Graduated |
| Darion Dunn | 4 | DB | 6'1 | 192 | Senior | Oakdale, LA | Graduated |
| Ben Davis | 6 | LB | 6'4 | 236 | Senior | Gordo, AL | Graduated |
| Josh Thompson | 9 | DB | 6'0 | 191 | Senior | Nacogdoches, TX | Graduated |
| Brenden Schooler | 14 | DB | 6'2 | 206 | Senior | Dana Point, CA | Graduated |
| Cameron Dicker | 17 | K | 6'1 | 216 | Senior | Hong Kong | Graduated |
| Jarrett Smith | 23 | RB | 5'7 | 206 | Junior | Webster, TX | Graduated |
| Skyler Bonneau | 27 | RB | 6'1 | 220 | Senior | Coppell, TX | Graduated |
| Daniel Young | 32 | RB | 6'0 | 220 | Senior | Houston, TX | Graduated |
| Gabriel Watson | 33 | RB | 6'2 | 235 | Senior | Piedmont, CA | Graduated |
| Erwin Von Nacher | 38 | K | 6'1 | 167 | (redshirt) Freshman | Monterrey, Mexico | Graduated |
| Montrell Estell | 39 | WR | 6'1 | 196 | Senior | Hooks, TX | Graduated |
| Ray Thornton | 46 | LB | 6'3 | 238 | Senior | Killeen, TX | Graduated |
| Chandler Kelehan | 47 | LS | 6'1 | 195 | Junior | Marshall, TX | Graduated |
| Carlton Smith | 53 | LB | 6'3 | 237 | Senior | Houston, TX | Graduated |
| Justin Mader | 54 | DS | 6'2 | 236 | Senior | Magnolia, TX | Graduated |
| Tope Imade | 67 | OL | 6'6 | 361 | Senior | Arlington, TX | Graduated |
| Derek Kerstetter | 68 | OL | 6'5 | 310 | Senior | San Antonio, TX | Graduated |
| Denzel Okafor | 78 | OL | 6'4 | 322 | Senior | Lewisville, TX | Graduated |
| Cade Brewer | 80 | TE | 6'4 | 243 | Senior | Austin, TX | Graduated |
| Kartik Akkihal | 82 | WR | 6'2 | 192 | Junior | Austin, TX | Graduated |
| Kai Money | 83 | WR | 6'0 | 179 | Junior | South Padre Island, TX | Graduated |
| Travis West | 84 | WR | 6'0 | 174 | Junior | Dallas, TX | Graduated |

==== Outgoing transfers ====
| Name | No. | Pos. | Height | Weight | Hometown | Year | New school |
|---|---|---|---|---|---|---|---|
| Al'Vonte Woodard | 9 | WR | 6'2 | 193 | Houston, TX | Junior | Sam Houston State |
| B.J. Foster | 25 | DB | 6'2 | 199 | Angleton, TX | Senior | Sam Houston State |
| Casey Thompson | 11 | QB | 6'1 | 200 | Oklahoma City, OK | Junior | Nebraska |
| Chris Adimora | 1 | DB | 6'1 | 204 | Long Beach, CA | Junior | SMU |
| David Abiara | 55 | EDGE | 6'4 | 259 | Mansfield, TX | (redshirt) Freshman | SMU |
| Jared Wiley | 18 | TE | 6'7 | 251 | Temple, TX | Junior | TCU |
| Kelvontay Dixon | 16 | WR | 6'0 | 182 | Carthage, TX | Sophomore | SMU |
| Marques Caldwell | 24 | DB | 6'1 | 198 | Alvin, TX | Sophomore | Navarro |
| Marcus Tillman Jr. | 13 | LB | 6'1 | 239 | Orlando, FL | Sophomore | Navarro |
| Marcus Washington | 15 | WR | 6'2 | 195 | St. Louis, MO | Senior | Nebraska |
| Myron Warren | 92 | DL | 6'2 | 273 | Many, LA | Junior | Texas State |
| Ryan Bujcevski | 8 | P | 6'0 | 177 | Sydney, Australia | Senior | SMU |
| Terrence Cooks | 35 | LB | 6'2 | 220 | Pearland, TX | Freshman | TCU |
| Tyler Johnson | 72 | OL | 6'6 | 325 | Conroe, TX | Junior | Houston |
| Tyler Owens | 44 | S | 6'2 | 203 | Plano, TX | Junior | Texas Tech |
| Ayodele Adeoye | 40 | LB | 6'1 | 240 | St. Louis, MO | Junior | Sacramento State |
| Dajon Harrison | 30 | WR | 5'10 | 176 | Hutto, TX | (redshirt) Freshman | UConn |
| Jaden Hullaby | 29 | LB | 6'2 | 237 | Dallas, TX | Sophomore | New Mexico |
| Rafiti Ghirmai | 74 | OL | 6'5 | 296 | Frisco, TX | Junior | Abilene Christian |
| Jordon Thomas | 50 | EDGE | 6'3 | 274 | Port Arthur, TX | (redshirt) Freshman | Stephen F. Austin |
| Jaylen Garth | 77 | OL | 6'5 | 309 | Port Neches, TX | Sophomore | Houston |
| Joshua Moore | 6 | WR | 6'1 | 168 | Yoakum, TX | Junior | (Note: Moore entered the transfer portal. However, decided to sign with the Houston Gamblers of the USFL.) |
| Tremayne Prudhomme | 38 | DB | 6'1 | 187 | Houston, TX | Junior | — |
| Turner Symonds | 39 | DB | 6'1 | 178 | Fort Worth, TX | Junior | — |

Note: Players with a dash in the new school column didn't land on a new team for the 2022 season.

==== Coaching staff departures ====
During the off-season, Texas lost 2 position coaches and 3 support staff members. The two position coaches that departed the team were running backs coach Stan Drayton and wide receivers coach Andre Coleman. Drayton took an upgrade by becoming the 32nd head coach at Temple, while Coleman was relieved of his duties at Texas. Furthermore, Drayton and Coleman were the final 2 coaches that were under both previous head coach Tom Herman and current head coach Steve Sarkisian.

| Name | Position | New Team | New Position |
|---|---|---|---|
| Stan Drayton | RB | Temple | Head Coach |
| Andre Coleman | WR | — | — |
| Jake Kostner | GA | Limestone | OC/QB |
| Quinshon Odom | GA | Green Bay Packers | Coaching Assistant |
| Cole Moore | Assistant DPP | Oregon State | DPP |
| Cordae Hankton | Senior Analyst | Charlotte | Running Backs coach |
| Shawn Lewis | Wide Receiver Quality Control | Angelo State | Running Backs coach |

Note: Andre Coleman didn't find a new coaching job at the collegiate level for the 2022 season.

=== Acquisitions ===
==== Incoming transfers ====
Over the off-season, Texas added 7 players from the transfer portal. According to 247 Sports, Texas had the 8th ranked transfer class in the country. The first transfer was quarterback Quinn Ewers. Ewers transferred from Ohio State and was the highest ranked recruit since former Longhorn quarterback Vince Young. On the offensive side, Texas also added Alabama tight end Jahleel Billingsley, Alabama wide receiver Agiye Hall, Wyoming wide receiver Isaiah Neyor, and Iowa State wide receiver Tarique Milton. However, Texas only took 2 defensive transfers in Ohio State defensive back Ryan Watts and JMU linebacker Diamonte Tucker-Dorsey.

| Name | Pos. | Height | Weight | Hometown | Year | Prev school |
|---|---|---|---|---|---|---|
| Quinn Ewers | QB | 6'2 | 200 | Southlake, TX | Freshman | Ohio State |
| Ryan Watts | DB | 6'3 | 205 | Little Elm, TX | Sophomore | Ohio State |
| Jahleel Billingsley | TE | 6'4 | 230 | Chicago, IL | Senior | Alabama |
| Isaiah Neyor | WR | 6'3 | 210 | Fort Worth, TX | Junior | Wyoming |
| Agiye Hall | WR | 6'3 | 195 | Valrico, FL | Freshman | Alabama |
| Tarique Milton | WR | 5'10 | 188 | Bradenton, FL | Senior | Iowa State |
| Diamonte Tucker-Dorsey | LB | 5'10 | 214 | Norfolk, VA | Senior | JMU |

==== 2022 recruits ====
College recruiting
| Name | Hometown | School | Height | Weight | Commit date |
|---|---|---|---|---|---|
| DJ Campbell; OT | Arlington, TX | Bowie High School | 6 ft 3 in (1.91 m) | 310 lb (140 kg) | Feb 2, 2022 |
| DJ Campbell; OT | Recruit ratings: Rivals: 247Sports: ESPN: (91) | | | | |
| Kelvin Banks Jr. OT | Humble, TX | Summer Creek High School | 6 ft 5 in (1.96 m) | 300 lb (140 kg) | Dec 11, 2021 |
| Kelvin Banks Jr. OT | Recruit ratings: Rivals: 247Sports: ESPN: (87) | | | | |
| Neto Umeozulu; OL | Allen, TX | Allen High School | 6 ft 4 in (1.93 m) | 300 lb (140 kg) | Dec 13, 2021 |
| Neto Umeozulu; OL | Recruit ratings: Rivals: 247Sports: ESPN: (86) | | | | |
| Bryan Allen Jr. S | Aledo, TX | Aledo High School | 6 ft 0 in (1.83 m) | 185 lb (84 kg) | Feb 28, 2021 |
| Bryan Allen Jr. S | Recruit ratings: Rivals: 247Sports: ESPN: (85) | | | | |
| Justice Finkley; EDGE | Trussville, AL | Hewitt-Trussville High School | 6 ft 2 in (1.88 m) | 250 lb (110 kg) | Sep 9, 2021 |
| Justice Finkley; EDGE | Recruit ratings: Rivals: 247Sports: ESPN: (84) | | | | |
| Jaray Bledsoe; DL | Marlin, TX | Marlin High School | 6 ft 4 in (1.93 m) | 270 lb (120 kg) | Aug 30, 2021 |
| Jaray Bledsoe; DL | Recruit ratings: Rivals: 247Sports: ESPN: (83) | | | | |
| Brenen Thompson; WR | Spearman, TX | Spearman High School | 5 ft 10 in (1.78 m) | 170 lb (77 kg) | Oct 6, 2021 |
| Brenen Thompson; WR | Recruit ratings: Rivals: 247Sports: ESPN: (83) | | | | |
| Terrance Brooks; DB | Little Elm, TX | Little Elm High School | 5 ft 11 in (1.80 m) | 190 lb (86 kg) | Dec 15, 2021 |
| Terrance Brooks; DB | Recruit ratings: Rivals: 247Sports: ESPN: (83) | | | | |
| J'mond Tapp; EDGE | Donaldsonville, LA | Ascension Catholic High School | 6 ft 3 in (1.91 m) | 240 lb (110 kg) | Aug 30, 2021 |
| J'mond Tapp; EDGE | Recruit ratings: Rivals: 247Sports: ESPN: (83) | | | | |
| Kristopher Ross; DL | Houston, TX | North Shore Senior High School | 6 ft 3 in (1.91 m) | 265 lb (120 kg) | Mar 23, 2021 |
| Kristopher Ross; DL | Recruit ratings: Rivals: 247Sports: ESPN: (83) | | | | |
| Derrick Brown; EDGE | Texarkana, TX | Texas High School | 6 ft 3 in (1.91 m) | 210 lb (95 kg) | Jul 31, 2021 |
| Derrick Brown; EDGE | Recruit ratings: Rivals: 247Sports: ESPN: (82) | | | | |
| Austin Jordan; S | Denton, TX | Billy Ryan High School | 5 ft 11 in (1.80 m) | 185 lb (84 kg) | Jul 14, 2021 |
| Austin Jordan; S | Recruit ratings: Rivals: 247Sports: ESPN: (82) | | | | |
| Larry Turner-Gooden; S | Mission Hills, CA | Bishop Alemany High School | 6 ft 0 in (1.83 m) | 179 lb (81 kg) | Jan 8, 2022 |
| Larry Turner-Gooden; S | Recruit ratings: Rivals: 247Sports: ESPN: (81) | | | | |
| Maalik Murphy; QB | Gardena, CA | Junípero Serra High School | 6 ft 5 in (1.96 m) | 235 lb (107 kg) | Feb 13, 2021 |
| Maalik Murphy; QB | Recruit ratings: Rivals: 247Sports: ESPN: (81) | | | | |
| Jaydon Blue; RB | Houston, TX | Klein Cain High School | 5 ft 10 in (1.78 m) | 195 lb (88 kg) | Feb 2, 2021 |
| Jaydon Blue; RB | Recruit ratings: Rivals: 247Sports: ESPN: (81) | | | | |
| Jaylon Guilbeau; DB | Port Arthur, TX | Memorial High School | 5 ft 11.5 in (1.82 m) | 175 lb (79 kg) | Nov 25, 2021 |
| Jaylon Guilbeau; DB | Recruit ratings: Rivals: 247Sports: ESPN: (81) | | | | |
| Cameron Williams; OT | Duncanville, TX | Duncanville High School | 6 ft 5 in (1.96 m) | 360 lb (160 kg) | Dec 12, 2021 |
| Cameron Williams; OT | Recruit ratings: Rivals: 247Sports: ESPN: (81) | | | | |
| Malik Agbo; OT | Federal Way, WA | Todd Beamer High School | 6 ft 6 in (1.98 m) | 320 lb (150 kg) | Dec 15, 2021 |
| Malik Agbo; OT | Recruit ratings: Rivals: 247Sports: ESPN: (80) | | | | |
| Aaron Bryant; DL | Southaven, MS | Southaven High School | 6 ft 4 in (1.93 m) | 295 lb (134 kg) | Aug 26, 2021 |
| Aaron Bryant; DL | Recruit ratings: Rivals: 247Sports: ESPN: (80) | | | | |
| Cole Hutson; OL | Frisco, TX | Frisco High School | 6 ft 5 in (1.96 m) | 290 lb (130 kg) | Jul 2, 2021 |
| Cole Hutson; OL | Recruit ratings: Rivals: 247Sports: ESPN: (80) | | | | |
| Xavion Brice; ATH | Arlington, TX | Seguin High School | 6 ft 1 in (1.85 m) | 175 lb (79 kg) | Dec 15, 2021 |
| Xavion Brice; ATH | Recruit ratings: Rivals: 247Sports: ESPN: (80) | | | | |
| Trevell Johnson; LB | Arlington, TX | Martin High School | 6 ft 0 in (1.83 m) | 200 lb (91 kg) | Feb 13, 2021 |
| Trevell Johnson; LB | Recruit ratings: Rivals: 247Sports: ESPN: (80) | | | | |
| Zac Swanson; DL | Phoenix, AZ | Brophy College Preparatory | 6 ft 3 in (1.91 m) | 255 lb (116 kg) | Apr 26, 2021 |
| Zac Swanson; DL | Recruit ratings: Rivals: 247Sports: ESPN: (79) | | | | |
| Connor Robertson; OL | Austin, TX | Westlake High School | 6 ft 4 in (1.93 m) | 295 lb (134 kg) | Jul 2, 2021 |
| Connor Robertson; OL | Recruit ratings: Rivals: 247Sports: ESPN: (78) | | | | |
| Ethan Burke; EDGE | Austin, TX | Westlake High School | 6 ft 7 in (2.01 m) | 225 lb (102 kg) | Dec 15, 2021 |
| Ethan Burke; EDGE | Recruit ratings: Rivals: 247Sports: ESPN: (76) | | | | |
| Will Stone; K | Austin, TX | Regents School of Austin | 6 ft 0 in (1.83 m) | 180 lb (82 kg) | Jun 15, 2021 |
| Will Stone; K | Recruit ratings: Rivals: 247Sports: ESPN: (75) | | | | |
| Savion Red; WR | Grand Prairie, TX | Grand Prairie High School | 5 ft 10 in (1.78 m) | 210 lb (95 kg) | Dec 15, 2021 |
| Savion Red; WR | Recruit ratings: Rivals: 247Sports: ESPN: (74) | | | | |
| Lance St. Louis; LS | Gilbert, AZ | Williams Field High School | 6 ft 1 in (1.85 m) | 215 lb (98 kg) | Jun 7, 2021 |
| Lance St. Louis; LS | Recruit ratings: Rivals: 247Sports: ESPN: (69) | | | | |
Overall recruit ranking: Rivals: 5 247Sports: 5 ESPN: 4
Note: In many cases, Scout, Rivals, 247Sports, On3, and ESPN may conflict in their listings of height and weight.; In these cases, the average was taken. ESPN grades are on a 100-point scale.; Sources: "Rivals commits". Rivals.; "ESPN commits". ESPN.; "2022 Team Ranking". Rivals.com.; "247Sports commits". 247Sports.

==== 2022 overall class ranking ====
| Website | National rank | Conference rank | 5 star recruits | 4 star recruits | 3 star recruits | 2 star recruits | 1 star recruits | No star ranking |
|---|---|---|---|---|---|---|---|---|
| On3 Recruits | #5 | #1 | 2 | 20 | 6 | 0 | 0 | 0 |
| Rivals | #5 | #1 | 1 | 17 | 9 | 1 | 0 | 0 |
| 247 Sports | #5 | #1 | 2 | 18 | 7 | 1 | 0 | 0 |
| ESPN | #4 | #1 | 1 | 21 | 5 | 1 | 0 | 0 |

==== 2023 recruits ====
College recruiting
| Name | Hometown | School | Height | Weight | Commit date |
|---|---|---|---|---|---|
| Arch Manning; QB | New Orleans, LA | Isidore Newman School | 6 ft 4 in (1.93 m) | 215 lb (98 kg) | Jun 23, 2022 |
| Arch Manning; QB | Recruit ratings: Rivals: 247Sports: ESPN: (93) | | | | |
| Anthony Hill; LB | Denton, TX | Billy Ryan High School | 6 ft 2 in (1.88 m) | 225 lb (102 kg) | Dec 15, 2022 |
| Anthony Hill; LB | Recruit ratings: Rivals: 247Sports: ESPN: (90) | | | | |
| Johntay Cook II; WR | DeSoto, TX | DeSoto High School | 6 ft 0 in (1.83 m) | 175 lb (79 kg) | Jun 29, 2022 |
| Johntay Cook II; WR | Recruit ratings: Rivals: 247Sports: ESPN: (86) | | | | |
| Cedric Baxter Jr. RB | Orlando, FL | Edgewater High School | 6 ft 1 in (1.85 m) | 215 lb (98 kg) | Aug 10, 2022 |
| Cedric Baxter Jr. RB | Recruit ratings: Rivals: 247Sports: ESPN: (86) | | | | |
| Derek Williams; S | New Iberia, LA | Westgate High School | 6 ft 2 in (1.88 m) | 185 lb (84 kg) | Jun 27, 2022 |
| Derek Williams; S | Recruit ratings: Rivals: 247Sports: ESPN: (86) | | | | |
| Malik Muhammad; CB | Dallas, TX | South Oak Cliff High School | 5 ft 11.5 in (1.82 m) | 175 lb (79 kg) | Jul 20, 2022 |
| Malik Muhammad; CB | Recruit ratings: Rivals: 247Sports: ESPN: (86) | | | | |
| Sydir Mitchell; DL | Oradell, NJ | Bergen Catholic High School | 6 ft 5 in (1.96 m) | 335 lb (152 kg) | Jul 3, 2022 |
| Sydir Mitchell; DL | Recruit ratings: Rivals: 247Sports: ESPN: (86) | | | | |
| DeAndre Moore Jr. WR | Bellflower, CA | St. John Bosco High School | 6 ft 00 in (1.83 m) | 185 lb (84 kg) | Dec 22, 2022 |
| DeAndre Moore Jr. WR | Recruit ratings: Rivals: 247Sports: ESPN: (85) | | | | |
| Ryan Niblett; WR | Houston, TX | Eisenhower High School | 5 ft 10 in (1.78 m) | 170 lb (77 kg) | Apr 23, 2022 |
| Ryan Niblett; WR | Recruit ratings: Rivals: 247Sports: ESPN: (84) | | | | |
| Tausili Akana; EDGE | Lehi, UT | Skyridge High School | 6 ft 4 in (1.93 m) | 225 lb (102 kg) | Dec 21, 2022 |
| Tausili Akana; EDGE | Recruit ratings: Rivals: 247Sports: ESPN: (84) | | | | |
| Derion Gullette; LB | Teague, TX | Teague High School | 6 ft 2 in (1.88 m) | 220 lb (100 kg) | Aug 5, 2022 |
| Derion Gullette; LB | Recruit ratings: Rivals: 247Sports: ESPN: (83) | | | | |
| Colton Vasek; EDGE | Austin, TX | Westlake High School | 6 ft 5.5 in (1.97 m) | 225 lb (102 kg) | Nov 8, 2022 |
| Colton Vasek; EDGE | Recruit ratings: Rivals: 247Sports: ESPN: (82) | | | | |
| S'Maje Burrell; LB | Fort Worth, TX | North Crowley High School | 6 ft 0 in (1.83 m) | 215 lb (98 kg) | Apr 2, 2022 |
| S'Maje Burrell; LB | Recruit ratings: Rivals: 247Sports: ESPN: (81) | | | | |
| Jelani McDonald; ATH | Waco, TX | Connally High School | 6 ft 2 in (1.88 m) | 197 lb (89 kg) | Jan 7, 2023 |
| Jelani McDonald; ATH | Recruit ratings: Rivals: 247Sports: ESPN: (81) | | | | |
| Warren Roberson; DB | Red Oak, TX | Red Oak High School | 6 ft 0 in (1.83 m) | 180 lb (82 kg) | Feb 7, 2023 |
| Warren Roberson; DB | Recruit ratings: Rivals: 247Sports: ESPN: (80) | | | | |
| Payton Kirkland; OT | Orlando, FL | Dr. Phillips High School | 6 ft 6 in (1.98 m) | 345 lb (156 kg) | Jul 23, 2022 |
| Payton Kirkland; OT | Recruit ratings: Rivals: 247Sports: ESPN: (80) | | | | |
| Tre Wisner; RB | DeSoto, TX | DeSoto High School | 5 ft 11 in (1.80 m) | 180 lb (82 kg) | Apr 23, 2022 |
| Tre Wisner; RB | Recruit ratings: Rivals: 247Sports: ESPN: (80) | | | | |
| Connor Stroh; OT | Frisco, TX | Wakeland High School | 6 ft 6.5 in (1.99 m) | 345 lb (156 kg) | Jun 26, 2022 |
| Connor Stroh; OT | Recruit ratings: Rivals: 247Sports: ESPN: (80) | | | | |
| Jaydon Chatman; IOL | Harker Heights, TX | Harker Heights High School | 6 ft 4 in (1.93 m) | 300 lb (140 kg) | Jun 26, 2022 |
| Jaydon Chatman; IOL | Recruit ratings: Rivals: 247Sports: ESPN: (80) | | | | |
| Liona Lefau; LB | Kahuku, HI | Kahuku High School | 6 ft 1 in (1.85 m) | 210 lb (95 kg) | Jun 25, 2022 |
| Liona Lefau; LB | Recruit ratings: Rivals: 247Sports: ESPN: (79) | | | | |
| Spencer Shannon; TE | Santa Ana, CA | Mater Dei High School | 6 ft 7 in (2.01 m) | 240 lb (110 kg) | Jun 13, 2022 |
| Spencer Shannon; TE | Recruit ratings: Rivals: 247Sports: ESPN: (78) | | | | |
| Andre Cojoe; IOL | Arlington, TX | Mansfield Timberview High School | 6 ft 6 in (1.98 m) | 330 lb (150 kg) | Jun 26, 2022 |
| Andre Cojoe; IOL | Recruit ratings: Rivals: 247Sports: ESPN: (78) | | | | |
| Billy Walton; EDGE | Dallas, TX | South Oak Cliff High School | 6 ft 2.5 in (1.89 m) | 215 lb (98 kg) | Jun 28, 2022 |
| Billy Walton; EDGE | Recruit ratings: Rivals: 247Sports: ESPN: (78) | | | | |
| Will Randle; TE | New Orleans, LA | Isidore Newman School | 6 ft 3 in (1.91 m) | 220 lb (100 kg) | Jun 19, 2022 |
| Will Randle; TE | Recruit ratings: Rivals: 247Sports: ESPN: (77) | | | | |
| Trevor Goosby; OT | Melissa, TX | Melissa High School | 6 ft 6 in (1.98 m) | 280 lb (130 kg) | Jun 26, 2022 |
| Trevor Goosby; OT | Recruit ratings: Rivals: 247Sports: ESPN: (77) | | | | |
Overall recruit ranking: Rivals: 3 247Sports: 5
Note: In many cases, Scout, Rivals, 247Sports, On3, and ESPN may conflict in their listings of height and weight.; In these cases, the average was taken. ESPN grades are on a 100-point scale.; Sources: "Rivals commits". Rivals.; "ESPN commits". ESPN.; "2023 Team Ranking". Rivals.com.; "247Sports commits". 247Sports.

==== 2023 overall class ranking ====
| Website | National rank | Conference rank | 5 star recruits | 4 star recruits | 3 star recruits | 2 star recruits | 1 star recruits | No star ranking |
|---|---|---|---|---|---|---|---|---|
| On3 Recruits | #3 | #1 | 3 | 13 | 9 | 0 | 0 | 0 |
| Rivals | #3 | #1 | 2 | 15 | 8 | 0 | 0 | 0 |
| 247 Sports | #3 | #1 | 4 | 14 | 9 | 0 | 0 | 0 |
| ESPN | — | — | 2 | 17 | 6 | 0 | 0 | 0 |

==== Walk-ons ====
| Name | Pos. | Height | Weight | Hometown | High school |
|---|---|---|---|---|---|
| Hamilton McMartin | DB | 5'11 | 182 | Katy, TX | Katy High School |
| Gus Asel | WR | 6'2 | 211 | Frisco, TX | Reedy High School |
| Joe Tatum | QB | 5'11 | 174 | Los Angeles, CA | Loyola High School |
| Ky Woods | RB | 5'10 | 169 | League City, TX | Clear Springs High School |
| Colin Page | RB | 5'11 | 210 | Austin, TX | Anderson High School |
| Carson Marshall | DB | 6'0 | 189 | Katy, TX | Katy High School |
| Koby Kidd | LB | 6'2 | 215 | Weatherford, TX | Weatherford High School |
| Quinn Merritt | WR | 6'1 | 190 | Los Gatos, CA | Los Gatos High School |
| Graham Gillespie | DB | 6'2 | 190 | Cypress, TX | Bridgeland High School |
| Remy Patson | WR | 5’9 | 164 | Austin, TX | Regents School of Austin |
| Ben Armstrong | EDGE | 6'4 | 258 | Leander, TX | Rouse High School |
| Joshua Egbuna | EDGE | 6'4 | 248 | Mansfield, TX | Lake Ridge High School |
| Charles Feris | K | 6'2 | 214 | Houston, TX | Cypress Ranch High School |
| Michael Flanagan | LB | 6'3 | 228 | Frisco, TX | Wakeland High School |
| Patrick McBroom | OL | 6'2 | 296 | Fort Worth, TX | All Saints School |
| Myles Hill | TE | 6'4 | 204 | Arlington, TX | Martin High School |
| Gabe Sulser | WR | 5'9 | 167 | Billings, MT | Billings Senior High School |
| Reece Beauchamp | WR | 6'2 | 190 | Austin, TX | Vandegrift High School |

==== Coaching staff additions ====
| Name | New Position | Previous Team | Previous Position | Source |
|---|---|---|---|---|
| Tashard Choice | Running Backs coach | Georgia Tech | Running Backs coach | |
| Brennan Marion | Wide Receivers coach | Pittsburgh | Wide Receivers coach | |
| Gary Patterson | Special Assistant to the head coach | TCU | Head Coach | |
| Ray Pickering | Quality Control Coach | Lane College | Offensive Coordinator | |
| Robert Merritt | Assistant Director - Player Personnel Scouting | Edmonton Elks | Assistant General Manager | |
| Austin Shelton | Assistant Director - Player Personnel | NC State | Assistant Director of player personnel | |
| Joey Thomas | Analyst | FAU | Wide Receivers coach | |
| Tyler Johnson | Recruiting Operations Coordinator | Jacksonville State | On-Campus Recruiting Coordinator | |

=== NFL undrafted free agents ===
No Longhorns were selected in the 2022 NFL Draft, a first since 2014. However, 6 players were signed as undrafted free agents.

| Player | Position | Team | Source |
|---|---|---|---|
| Brenden Schooler | S | New England Patriots | |
| Cade Brewer | TE | Seattle Seahawks | |
| Cameron Dicker | K | Los Angeles Rams | |
| Denzel Okafor | OL | Jacksonville Jaguars | |
| Derek Kerstetter | OL | Buffalo Bills | |
| Josh Thompson | DB | Jacksonville Jaguars | |

=== NFL Draft Combine ===
2022 NFL Combine Participants
| Name | POS | HT | WT | Arms | Hands | 40 | Bench Press | Vert Jump | Broad Jump | 3 Cone Drill | 20-yd Shuttle | 60-yd Shuttle | Ref |
|---|---|---|---|---|---|---|---|---|---|---|---|---|---|
| Cameron Dicker | K | 6'1" | 220 lbs | 30" | 9" | DNP | DNP | DNP | DNP | DNP | DNP | DNP | |
| Josh Thompson | DB | 5'11 1/2" | 194 lbs | 30 7/8" | 9 3/8" | 4.40 | DNP | DNP | DNP | DNP | DNP | DNP | |

† Top performer

DNP = Did not participate

=== Returning starters ===
Texas returns 7 starters on offense, 12 starters on defense, and 1 starter on special teams. 3 of the 7 offensive starters are seniors, 9 of the 12 defensive starters are seniors, and the lone special teams player is a senior.

Offense
| Player | Class | Position |
|---|---|---|
| Bijan Robinson | Junior | RB |
| Roschon Johnson | Senior | RB |
| Jordan Whittington | Junior | WR |
| Xavier Worthy | Sophomore | WR |
| Jake Majors | Sophomore | OL |
| Junior Angilau | Senior | OL |
| Christian Jones | Senior | OL |

Defense
| Player | Class | Position |
|---|---|---|
| Keondre Coburn | Senior | DL |
| T'Vondre Sweat | Senior | DL |
| Moro Ojomo | Senior | DL |
| Alfred Collins | Junior | DL |
| DeMarvion Overshown | Senior | LB |
| Luke Brockermeyer | Senior | LB |
| Ovie Oghoufo | Senior | LB |
| Jett Bush | Senior | LB |
| D'Shawn Jamison | Senior | DB |
| Anthony Cook | Senior | DB |
| Jahdae Barron | Junior | DB |
| Jerrin Thompson | Junior | S |

Special teams
| Player | Class | Position |
|---|---|---|
| Zach Edwards | Senior | H |

== Preseason ==
The preseason poll was released on July 7, 2022.

Big 12 media poll
| Predicted finish | Team | Votes (1st place) |
| 1 | Baylor | 365 (17) |
| 2 | Oklahoma | 354 (12) |
| 3 | Oklahoma State | 342 (9) |
| 4 | Texas | 289 (2) |
| 5 | Kansas State | 261 |
| 6 | Iowa State | 180 (1) |
| 7 | TCU | 149 |
| 8 | West Virginia | 147 |
| 9 | Texas Tech | 119 |
| 10 | Kansas | 48 |

=== Award watch lists ===
Listed in the order that they were released

| Award | Player | Position | Year | Source |
|---|---|---|---|---|
| Maxwell Award | Bijan Robinson | RB | Junior | |
| Maxwell Award | Xavier Worthy | WR | Sophomore | |
| Doak Walker Award | Bijan Robinson | RB | Junior | |
| Doak Walker Award | Roschon Johnson | RB | Senior | |
| Biletnikoff Award | Xavier Worthy | WR | Sophomore | |
| Biletnikoff Award | Isaiah Neyor | WR | Junior | |
| John Mackey Award | Ja'Tavion Sanders | TE | Sophomore | |
| Butkus Award | DeMarvion Overshown | LB | Senior | |
| Wuerffel Trophy | Bijan Robinson | RB | Junior | |
| Paul Hornung Award | D'Shawn Jamison | DB | Senior | |
| Walter Camp Award | Bijan Robinson | RB | Junior | |
| Walter Camp Award | Xavier Worthy | WR | Sophomore | |
| Bronko Nagurski Trophy | DeMarvion Overshown | LB | Senior | |
| Rotary Lombardi Award | DeMarvion Overshown | LB | Senior | |
| Earl Campbell Tyler Rose Award | Bijan Robinson | RB | Junior | |

=== Preseason Big-12 awards ===
Big 12 Offensive Player of the Year
| Player | No. | Position | Class | Source |
| Bijan Robinson | 5 | RB | Junior | |

2022 Preseason All-Big 12 teams

| Position | Player | Class |
|---|---|---|
Offense
| RB | Bijan Robinson | Junior |
| WR | Xavier Worthy | Sophomore |
Defense
| LB | DeMarvion Overshown | Senior |

=== Preseason All-Americans ===
First Team All-Americans
| Player | No. | Position | Class | Selector(s) | Source(s) |
| Bijan Robinson | 5 | RB | Junior | AP; CBS; CFN; PFF; Walter Camp; Sporting News; Athlon Sports | |

Second Team All-Americans
| Player | No. | Position | Class | Selector(s) | Source(s) |
| Xavier Worthy | 8 | WR | Sophomore | AP; CFN; PFF; Walter Camp; Sporting News; Athlon Sports | |

== Schedule ==
Texas and the Big 12 announced the 2022 football schedule on December 1, 2021. Texas will play 7 home games, 4 away games, and 1 neutral site game. The 7 home games will be played against Louisiana-Monroe, Alabama, UTSA, West Virginia, Iowa State, TCU, and Baylor. The 4 away games will be played against Texas Tech, Oklahoma State, Kansas State, and Kansas. The 1 neutral site game will be played against Oklahoma at the Cotton Bowl in Dallas, Texas in the annual Red River Showdown.

| Date | Time | Opponent | Rank | Site | TV | Result | Attendance |
|---|---|---|---|---|---|---|---|
| September 3 | 11:00 a.m. | Louisiana–Monroe* | | Darrell K Royal–Texas Memorial Stadium; Austin, TX | LHN | W 52–10 | 94,873 |
| September 10 | 11:00 a.m. | No. 1 Alabama* | | Darrell K Royal–Texas Memorial Stadium; Austin, TX (Big Noon Kickoff / College GameDay) | FOX | L 19–20 | 105,213 (Note: 105,213 sets new all-time attendance record at Darrell K Royal–Texas Memorial Stadium, breaking the previous record of 103,507 set on September 15, 2018 vs USC.) |
| September 17 | 7:00 p.m. | UTSA* | No. 21 | Darrell K Royal–Texas Memorial Stadium; Austin, TX | LHN | W 41–20 | 102,520 (Note: 102,520 is the 3rd largest attendance to date at Darrell K Royal–Texas Memorial Stadium, passing the 102,498 crowd set on November 17, 2018 vs Iowa State. This is also the largest crowd that UTSA has played in front of.) |
| September 24 | 2:30 p.m. | at Texas Tech | No. 22 | Jones AT&T Stadium; Lubbock, TX (rivalry) | ESPN | L 34–37 ^{OT} | 60,975 |
| October 1 | 6:30 p.m. | West Virginia | | Darrell K Royal–Texas Memorial Stadium; Austin, TX | FS1 | W 38–20 | 100,740 |
| October 8 | 11:00 a.m. | vs. Oklahoma | | Cotton Bowl; Dallas, TX (Red River Rivalry) | ABC | W 49–0 | 92,100 |
| October 15 | 11:00 a.m. | Iowa State | No. 22 | Darrell K Royal–Texas Memorial Stadium; Austin, TX | ABC | W 24–21 | 100,072 |
| October 22 | 2:30 p.m. | at No. 11 Oklahoma State | No. 20 | Boone Pickens Stadium; Stillwater, OK | ABC | L 34–41 | 55,509 |
| November 5 | 6:00 p.m. | at No. 13 Kansas State | No. 24 | Bill Snyder Family Football Stadium; Manhattan, KS | FS1 | W 34–27 | 51,216 |
| November 12 | 6:30 p.m. | No. 4 TCU | No. 18 | Darrell K Royal–Texas Memorial Stadium; Austin, TX (rivalry / College GameDay) | ABC | L 10–17 | 104,203 (Note: 104,203 is the 2nd largest attendance to date at Darrell K Royal–Texas Memorial Stadium, passing the 103,507 crowd set on September 15, 2018 vs USC.) |
| November 19 | 2:30 p.m. | at Kansas | | David Booth Kansas Memorial Stadium; Lawrence, KS | FS1 | W 55–14 | 38,246 |
| November 25 | 11:00 a.m. | Baylor | No. 23 | Darrell K Royal–Texas Memorial Stadium; Austin, TX (rivalry) | ESPN | W 38–27 | 94,076 |
| December 29 | 8:00 p.m. | vs. No. 12 Washington* | No. 20 | Alamodome; San Antonio, TX (Alamo Bowl) | ESPN | L 20–27 | 62,730 |
*Non-conference game; Rankings from AP Poll (and CFP Rankings, after November 1) - Released prior to game; All times are in Central time; Source: Texas Sports

== Personnel ==
=== Coaching staff ===
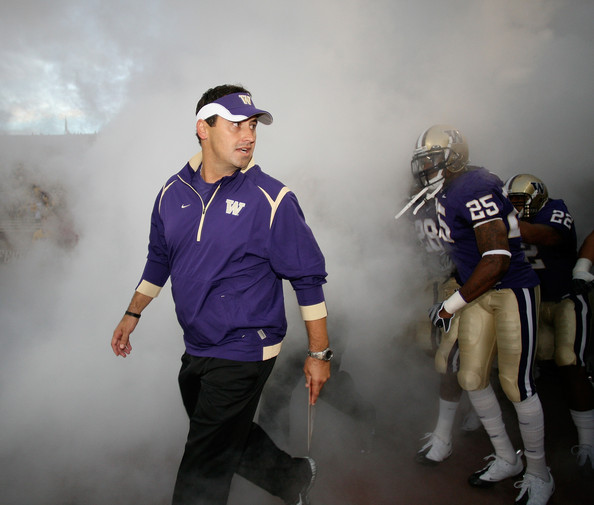
Texas Head Coach Steve Sarkisian when he was the head coach at Washington

| Coach | Title | Years at Texas | Previous job |
|---|---|---|---|
| Steve Sarkisian | Head Coach | 2nd | Alabama (OC) |
| Jeff Banks | AHC/TE/ST | 2nd | Alabama (TE/ST) |
| Kyle Flood | OC/OL | 2nd | Alabama (OL) |
| A. J. Milwee | QB | 2nd | Alabama (offensive analyst) |
| Tashard Choice | RB | 1st | Georgia Tech (RB) |
| Brennan Marion | WR/PGC | 1st | Pittsburgh (WR) |
| Pete Kwiatkowski | DC/OLB | 2nd | Washington (DC/OLB) |
| Jeff Choate | Co-DC, ILB | 2nd | Montana State (HC) |
| Bo Davis | DL | 2nd | Detroit Lions (DL) |
| Terry Joseph | DB | 2nd | Notre Dame (DB) |
| Blake Gideon | S | 2nd | Ole Miss (ST) |
| Torre Becton | S&C | 2nd | California (S&C) |

==== Support staff ====
- Jason grooms – Chief of Staff
- Matt smidebush – Director of operations
- Jason rodriquez – Assistant operations coordinator
- Billy glasscock – Director of player personnel
- Chris gilbert – Director of high school relations
- Brandon Harris – Director of Recruiting
- John michael jones – Assistant director, Player Personnel, Offense
- Robert merritt – Assistant director, Player Personnel, Scouting
- Austin shelton – Assistant director, Player Personnel, Defense
- Taylor searels – Director of Recruiting Operations
- Tyler Johnson — Coordinator of Recruiting Operations
- Kevin washington – Director of player development
- Michael Huff – Assistant director of player development
- Matt Rutherford — Director, Equipment Operations
- Trevor Cook — Assistant Equipment Manager
- Joshua Peterson — Assistant Equipment Manager
- Derek Ochoa — Director of Football Creative Media
- Kyle Barkle — Assistant Director of Creative Media
- Patrick Perala — Senior Graphic Designer
- Michael Good — Content Creator
- James Bray — Head Team Physician
- Donald Nguyen — Senior Associate Athletic Trainer, Head Athletic Trainer
- Daryl Faulkner — Associate Athletic Trainer
- Johnathan Tran — Assistant Athletic Trainer
- Stephen Galvan — Assistant Athletic Trainer
- Cory Castro — Assistant Coach, Athletic Performance
- Isaiah Gonzales — Assistant Coach, Athletic Performance
- Markus James — Assistant Coach, Athletic Performance
- Joe Vaughn — Assistant Coach, Athletic Performance
- Jeff Nelson — Director of Football Academic Services
- Amy Culp — Assistant Athletic Director, Sports Dietitian and Clinical Wellness
- Kirsten Gregurich — Assistant Sports Dietitian
- DJ Welte — Director, Football Video Operations
- Bob Napoles — Senior Video Coordinator
- Desmond Dildy — Video Coordinator
- Esmee Smiley — Video Coordinator
- Kyrah mccowan – Director, Football Administration and Program Relations
- Amy Biegel — Assistant Program Administrator

==== Analysts ====
- Gary Patterson – Special assistant to the head coach
- David Brock — Senior Analyst, Offense
- Greg McMahon — Analyst, Special Teams
- Jeff crosby – Senior Analyst, Special Teams
- Henry fernandez – Senior Analyst, Defense
- Joey thomas – Senior Analyst, Defense
- John dozier dean – Analyst, Offense
- Michael bimonte – Analyst, Offense
- Ray pickering – Analyst, Offense

==== Graduate assistants ====
- Tyler Fambrough — Offense
- Mitch Zoloty — Offense
- Tevis Bartlett — Defense
- Nico Johnson — Defense

=== Roster ===
2022 Texas Longhorns Football Roster
| Quarterback: 1 Hudson Card – sophomore (6'2, 201); 3 Quinn Ewers – (redshirt) freshman (6'2, 206); 6 Maalik Murphy – freshman (6'5, 227); 14 Charles Wright – (redshirt) freshman (6'1, 202); 16 Ben Ballard – senior (5'11, 202); 19 Cole Lourd – (redshirt) freshman (6'2, 220); 25 Joe Tatum – freshman (5'11, 174); Running back: 2 Roschon Johnson – senior (6'2, 223); 5 Bijan Robinson – junior (6'0, 220); 7 Keilan Robinson – junior (5'9, 185); 23 Jaydon Blue – freshman (6'0, 190); 24 Jonathon Brooks – (redshirt) freshman (6'0, 204); 26 Ky Woods – freshman (5'10, 169); 27 Colin Page – freshman (5'11, 210); 31 Anton Simieou – sophomore (5'11, 201); Wide receiver: 4 Jordan Whittington – junior (6'1, 203); 8 Xavier Worthy – sophomore (6'1, 163); 11 Brenen Thompson – freshman (5'11, 162); 13 Jaden Alexis – (redshirt) freshman (6'0, 187); 15 Agiye Hall – sophomore (6'3, 194); 16 Tarique Milton – senior (5'10, 192); 17 Savion Red – freshman (5'11, 206); 18 Isaiah Neyor (injured) – junior (6'3, 216); 21 Troy Omeire – sophomore (6'3, 221); 35 Quinn Merritt – freshman (6'1, 190); 38 Remy Patson – freshman (5’9, 164); 39 Hamilton McMartin – freshman (5'11, 179); 49 Thatcher Milton – (redshirt) freshman (5'10, 182); 82 Gus Asel – junior (6'2, 211); 83 Gabe Sulser – senior (5'9, 167); 84 Reece Beauchamp – freshman (6'2, 190); 86 Paxton Anderson – sophomore (6'4, 215); 87 Parker Alford – senior (5'10, 177); 88 Casey Cain – (redshirt) freshman (6'3, 195); Tight end: 0 Ja'Tavion Sanders – sophomore (6'4, 249); 9 Jahleel Billingsley – senior (6'4, 219) (Note: Jahleel Billingsley departed the team 11 games into the season.); 42 Nathan Hatter – junior (6'2, 241); 48 Patrick Bayouth – junior (6'4, 276); 80 Myles Hill – freshman (6'4, 204); 81 Juan Davis – sophomore (6'4, 219); 85 Gunnar Helm – sophomore (6'5, 254); 89 Brayden Liebrock – junior (6'4, 232); Kicker/Punter: 15 Will Stone - K – freshman (6'0, 186); 35 Daniel Trejo - P – senior (6'2, 195); 45 Bert Auburn - K – (redshirt) freshman (6'0, 177); 47 Charles Feris - K – freshman (6'0, 214); 49 Isaac Pearson - P – (redshirt) freshman (6'2, 213); 96 Gabriel Lozano – K – sophomore (6'0, 179); Deep Snapper: 43 Zach Edwards – senior (5'11, 213); 57 Christian Rizzi – (redshirt) freshman (5'11, 224); 58 Lance St. Louis – freshman (6'1, 213) | Offensive line: 52 DJ Campbell – freshman (6'3, 321); 54 Cole Hutson – freshman (6'5, 303); 56 Cameron Williams – freshman (6'7, 374); 61 Sawyer Goram-Welch – sophomore (6'4, 294); 62 Connor Robertson – freshman (6'4, 298); 63 Patrick McBroom – freshman (6'2, 296); 64 Michael Balis – senior (6'5, 278); 65 Jake Majors – sophomore (6'3, 315); 66 Chad Wolf – junior (6'3, 271); 67 Malik Agbo – freshman (6'6, 337); 69 Andrej Karic – sophomore (6'4, 305); 70 Christian Jones – senior (6'6, 328); 71 Logan Parr – (redshirt) freshman (6'4, 309); 72 Neto Umeozulu – freshman (6'5, 314); 75 Junior Angilau (injured) – senior (6'6, 320); 76 Hayden Conner – sophomore (6'5, 318); 78 Kelvin Banks Jr. – freshman (6'5, 318); 79 Max Merril – (redshirt) freshman (6'4, 295); Defensive line: 45 Vernon Broughton – sophomore (6'4, 292); 53 Aaron Bryant – freshman (6'4, 307); 86 Zac Swanson – freshman (6'4, 250); 90 Byron Murphy II – sophomore (6'1, 309); 93 T'Vondre Sweat – senior (6'4, 340); 94 Jaray Bledsoe – freshman (6'4, 261); 95 Alfred Collins – junior (6'5, 288); 97 Kristopher Ross – freshman (6'3, 265); 98 Moro Ojomo – senior (6'3, 281); 99 Keondre Coburn – senior (6'2, 343); EDGE: 1 Justice Finkley – freshman (6'2, 245); 17 J'mond Tapp – freshman (6'3, 247); 18 Ovie Oghoufo – senior (6'3, 242); 32 Prince Dorbah – sophomore (6'3, 243); 40 Ben Armstrong – freshman (6'4, 258); 42 D.J. Harris Jr. – (redshirt) freshman (6'2, 234); 46 Joshua Egbuna – freshman (6'4, 248); 52 Chris Hannon – senior (6'2, 219); 88 Barryn Sorrell – sophomore (6'3, 256); 91 Ethan Burke – freshman (6'7, 234) | Linebacker: 0 DeMarvion Overshown – Senior (6'4, 224); 2 Diamonte Tucker-Dorsey – Senior (5'10, 219); 9 Derrick Brown – freshman (6'4, 206); 25 Trevell Johnson – freshman (6'1, 186); 30 Devin Richardson – senior (6'3, 235); 33 David Gbenda – junior (6'0, 235); 35 Koby Kidd – freshman (6'2, 215); 41 Jaylan Ford – junior (6'2, 238); 43 Jett Bush – senior (6'2, 245); 47 Luke Brockermeyer – senior (6'3, 226); 50 Michael Flanagan – freshman (6'3, 228); 51 Marshall Landwehr – (redshirt) freshman (6'0, 223); Defensive back: 3 Larry Turner-Gooden – freshman (6'0, 196); 4 Austin Jordan – freshman (6'0, 197); 5 D'Shawn Jamison – senior (5'10, 187); 6 Ryan Watts – junior (6'3, 206); 7 B.J. Allen Jr. – freshman (6'0, 205); 8 Terrance Brooks – freshman (5'11, 198); 11 Anthony Cook – senior (6'1, 195); 13 Jaylon Guilbeau – freshman (6'0, 182); 14 X'avion Brice – freshman (6'1, 176); 19 Ishmael Ibraheem – (redshirt) freshman (6'1, 162) (S) (Note: Ishmael Ibraheem was indefinitely suspended in September.); 21 Kitan Crawford – junior (5'11, 198); 23 Jahdae Barron – junior (5'11, 188); 27 JD Coffey III – sophomore (6'0, 188); 28 Jerrin Thompson – junior (6'0, 190); 29 Carson Marshall – freshman (6'0, 189); 31 Jamier Johnson – sophomore (6'0, 174); 36 Michael Taaffe – (redshirt) freshman (6'0, 186); 37 Morice Blackwell Jr. – sophomore (6'1, 203); 37 Doak Wilson – junior (6'0, 192); 38 Graham Gillespie – freshman (6'2, 190); 44 Tannahill Love – sophomore (5'11, 229); Legend: (C) Team captain; (S) Suspended; (I) Ineligible; Injured; Redshirt |

=== Roster outlook ===
(*)Redshirt

| Senior | Junior | Sophomore | Freshman |
|---|---|---|---|
| Anthony Cook; Ben Ballard; Chris Hannon; Christian Jones; Daniel Trejo; DeMarvion Overshown; Devin Richardson; Diamonte Tucker-Dorsey; D'Shawn Jamison; Gabe Sulser; Jahleel Billingsley; Jett Bush; Junior Angilau; Keondre Coburn; Luke Brockermeyer; Michael Balis; Moro Ojomo; Ovie Oghoufo; Parker Alford; Roschon Johnson; Tarique Milton; T'Vondre Sweat; Zach Edwards | Alfred Collins; Bijan Robinson; Brayden Liebrock; Chad Wolf; Christian Tschauner; David Gbenda; Doak Wilson; Gus Asel; Isaiah Hookfin; Isaiah Neyor; Jahdae Barron; Jaylan Ford; Jerrin Thompson; Jordan Whittington; Keilan Robinson; Kitan Crawford; Myron Warren; Nathan Hatter; Patrick Bayouth; Ryan Watts | Agiye Hall; Andrej Karic; Anton Simieou; Barryn Sorrell; Byron Murphy II; Gabriel Lozano; Gunnar Helm; Hayden Conner; Hudson Card; Jake Majors; Jamier Johnson; Ja'Tavion Sanders; JD Coffey III; Juan Davis; Morice Blackwell Jr. Paxton Anderson; Prince Dorbah; Sawyer Goram-Welch; Tannahill Love; Troy Omeire; Vernon Broughton; Xavier Worthy | Aaron Bryant; Austin Jordan; B.J. Allen Jr. Ben Armstrong; Bert Auburn*; Brenen Thompson; Cameron Williams; Carson Marshall; Casey Cain*; Charles Feris; Charles Wright*; Christian Rizzi*; Cole Hutson; Cole Lourd*; Colin Page; Connor Robertson; DJ Campbell; D.J. Harris Jr.* David Abiara*; Derrick Brown; Ethan Burke; Graham Gillespie; Hamilton McMartin; Isaac Pearson*; Ishmael Ibraheem*; Jaden Alexis*; Jaray Bledsoe; Jaydon Blue; Jaylon Guilbeau; J'Mond Tapp; Joe Tatum; Jonathon Brooks*; Joshua Egbuna; Justice Finkley; Kelvin Banks Jr. Koby Kidd; Kristopher Ross; Ky Woods; Lance St. Louis; Larry Turner-Gooden; Logan Parr*; Maalik Murphy; Malik Agbo; Marshall Landwehr*; Max Merril*; Michael Flanagan; Michael Taaffe*; Myles Hill; Neto Umeozulu; Patrick McBroom; Quinn Ewers*; Quinn Merritt; Reece Beauchamp; Remy Patson; Savion Red; Terrance Brooks; Thatcher Milton*; Trevell Johnson; Will Stone; X'avion Brice; Zac Swanson |

== Game summaries ==
=== Vs. Louisiana–Monroe ===
| Team | 1 | 2 | 3 | 4 | Total |
|---|---|---|---|---|---|
| ULM | 3 | 0 | 0 | 7 | 10 |
| • Texas | 14 | 10 | 21 | 7 | 52 |

- Date: September 3
- Location: Darrell K Royal–Texas Memorial Stadium (Austin, TX)
- Game start: 7:00 p.m.
- Game attendance: 94,873
- Game weather: Sunny
- Referee: Chris Tallent
- TV announcers (LHN): Lowell Galindo (play-by-play), Sam Acho (color), and Alex Chappell (sideline)
- Sources:Stats

| Statistics | ULM | Texas |
|---|---|---|
| First downs | 12 | 22 |
| Total yards | 259 | 383 |
| Rushing yards | 92 | 134 |
| Passing yards | 167 | 249 |
| Turnovers | 1 | 1 |
| Time of possession | 35:26 | 24:34 |

| Team | Category | Player | Statistics |
|---|---|---|---|
| ULM | Passing | Chandler Rogers | 14–19, 108 yards, 0 TD, 1 INT |
| ULM | Rushing | Zach Martin | 4 carries, 39 yards, 1 TD |
| ULM | Receiving | Jevin Frett | 4 receptions, 61 yards, 0 TD |
| Texas | Passing | Quinn Ewers | 16–24, 225 yards, 2 TD, 1 INT |
| Texas | Rushing | Bijan Robinson | 10 carries, 71 yards, 1 TD |
| Texas | Receiving | Ja'Tavion Sanders | 6 receptions, 85 yards, 1 TD |

Scoring summary

| Quarter | Time | Drive | | | Team | Scoring information | Score | |
| Quarter | Time | Plays | Yards | TOP | Team | Scoring information | ULM | TEX |
|---|---|---|---|---|---|---|---|---|
| 1st | 13:12 | | | | TEX | Keilan Robinson (#7) 12-yard touchdown off blocked punt, Bert Auburn (#45) kick good | 0 | 7 |
| 1st | 05:11 | 10 | 34 | 04:24 | ULM | 25-yard field goal by Calum Sutherland (#31) | 3 | 7 |
| 1st | 01:47 | 7 | 64 | 03:19 | TEX | Ja'Tavion Sanders (#1) 19-yard touchdown reception from Quinn Ewers (#3), Bert Auburn (#45) kick good | 3 | 14 |
| 2nd | 10:50 | 5 | 73 | 01:49 | TEX | Roschon Johnson (#2) 16-yard touchdown run, Bert Auburn (#45) kick good | 3 | 21 |
| 2nd | 03:14 | 7 | 25 | 03:10 | TEX | 41-yard field goal by Bert Auburn (#45) | 3 | 24 |
| 3rd | 13:08 | 6 | 52 | 01:46 | TEX | Bijan Robinson (#5) 16-yard touchdown reception from Quinn Ewers (#3), Bert Auburn (#45) kick good | 3 | 31 |
| 3rd | 09:41 | 5 | 50 | 01:26 | TEX | Bijan Robinson (#5) 9-yard touchdown run, Bert Auburn (#45) kick good | 3 | 38 |
| 3rd | 07:13 | 1 | 69 | 00:13 | TEX | Interception returned 69 yards for touchdown by D'Shawn Jamison (#5), Bert Auburn (#45) kick good | 3 | 45 |
| 4th | 06:24 | 11 | 62 | 05:22 | TEX | Jonathon Brooks (#24) 19-yard touchdown run, Bert Auburn (#45) kick good | 3 | 52 |
| 4th | 03:39 | 5 | 83 | 02:36 | ULM | Zach Martin (#22) 23-yard touchdown run, Calum Sutherland (#31) kick good | 10 | 52 |
| "TOP" = time of possession. For other American football terms, see Glossary of American football. | | | | | | | ULM 10 | TEX 52 |

=== Vs. No. 1 Alabama ===
| Team | 1 | 2 | 3 | 4 | Total |
|---|---|---|---|---|---|
| • No. 1 Alabama | 10 | 0 | 0 | 10 | 20 |
| Texas | 3 | 7 | 3 | 6 | 19 |

- Date: September 10
- Location: Darrell K Royal–Texas Memorial Stadium (Austin, TX)
- Game start: 11:00 a.m.
- Game attendance: 105,213
- Game weather: Sunny
- Referee: Scott Campbell
- TV announcers (Fox): Gus Johnson (play-by-play), Joel Klatt (color), and Jenny Taft (sideline)
- Sources:Stats

| Statistics | Alabama | Texas |
|---|---|---|
| First downs | 16 | 25 |
| Total yards | 374 | 371 |
| Rushing yards | 161 | 79 |
| Passing yards | 213 | 292 |
| Turnovers | 0 | 0 |
| Time of possession | 29:16 | 30:44 |

| Team | Category | Player | Statistics |
|---|---|---|---|
| Alabama | Passing | Bryce Young | 27–39, 213 yards, 1 TD |
| Alabama | Rushing | Jase McClellan | 6 carries, 97 yards, 1 TD |
| Alabama | Receiving | Jahmyr Gibbs | 9 receptions, 74 yards, 1 TD |
| Texas | Passing | Hudson Card | 14–22, 158 yards, 0 TD |
| Texas | Rushing | Bijan Robinson | 21 carries, 57 yards, 1 TD |
| Texas | Receiving | Xavier Worthy | 5 receptions, 97 yards, 0 TD |

ESPN College GameDay announced that they were returning to Austin for the 8th time, and the first time since 2019. They were set up at the LBJ Lawn.

Fox brought their Big Noon Kickoff pregame show to Austin for the first time, it was set up at the Winship Circle as part of the "Hook 'Em Hangout".

Scoring summary

| Quarter | Time | Drive | | | Team | Scoring information | Score | |
| Quarter | Time | Plays | Yards | TOP | Team | Scoring information | ALA | TEX |
|---|---|---|---|---|---|---|---|---|
| 1st | 9:00 | 11 | 57 | 6:13 | ALA | 52-yard field goal by Will Reichard (#16) | 3 | 0 |
| 1st | 2:51 | 14 | 67 | 5:56 | TEX | 26-yard field goal by Bert Auburn (#45) | 3 | 3 |
| 1st | 2:34 | 1 | 81 | 0:17 | ALA | Jase McClellan (#2) 81-yard touchdown run, Will Reichard (#16) kick kick good | 10 | 3 |
| 2nd | 14:55 | 6 | 75 | 2:39 | TEX | Bijan Robinson (#5) 1-yard touchdown run, Bert Auburn (#45) kick kick good | 10 | 10 |
| 3rd | 6:37 | 6 | 24 | 3:12 | TEX | 33-yard field goal by Bert Auburn (#45) | 10 | 13 |
| 4th | 12:55 | 12 | 65 | 5:47 | TEX | 24-yard field goal by Bert Auburn (#45) | 10 | 16 |
| 4th | 8:29 | 11 | 75 | 4:26 | ALA | Jahymr Gibbs (#1) 7-yard touchdown reception from Bryce Young (#9), Will Reichard kick kick good | 17 | 16 |
| 4th | 1:29 | 8 | 44 | 2:26 | TEX | 49-yard field goal by Bert Auburn (#45) | 17 | 19 |
| 4th | 0:10 | 9 | 61 | 1:19 | ALA | 33-yard field goal by Will Reichard (#16) | 20 | 19 |
| "TOP" = time of possession. For other American football terms, see Glossary of American football. | | | | | | | ALA 20 | TEX 19 |

=== Vs. UTSA ===
| Team | 1 | 2 | 3 | 4 | Total |
|---|---|---|---|---|---|
| UTSA | 3 | 14 | 3 | 0 | 20 |
| • No. 21 Texas | 0 | 17 | 14 | 10 | 41 |

- Date: September 17
- Location: Darrell K Royal–Texas Memorial Stadium (Austin, TX)
- Game start: 7:00 p.m.
- Game attendance: 102,520
- Game weather: Sunny
- Referee: Derek Anderson
- TV announcers (LHN): Lowell Galindo (play-by-play), Sam Acho (color), and Alex Chappell (sideline)
- Sources:Stats

| Statistics | UTSA | Texas |
|---|---|---|
| First downs | 29 | 21 |
| Total yards | 408 | 459 |
| Rushing yards | 139 | 298 |
| Passing yards | 269 | 161 |
| Turnovers | 1 | 0 |
| Time of possession | 36:21 | 23:39 |

| Team | Category | Player | Statistics |
|---|---|---|---|
| UTSA | Passing | Frank Harris | 24–35, 222 yards, 0 TD, 1 INT |
| UTSA | Rushing | Brenden Brady | 21 carries, 70 yards, 1 TD |
| UTSA | Receiving | Zakhari Franklin | 6 receptions, 84 yards, 1 TD |
| Texas | Passing | Hudson Card | 15–23, 161 yards, 1 TD |
| Texas | Rushing | Bijan Robinson | 20 carries, 183 yards, 3 TD |
| Texas | Receiving | Jordan Whittington | 4 receptions, 56 yards, 0 TD |

Scoring summary

| Quarter | Time | Drive | | | Team | Scoring information | Score | |
| Quarter | Time | Plays | Yards | TOP | Team | Scoring information | UTSA | TEX |
|---|---|---|---|---|---|---|---|---|
| 1st | 03:28 | 20 | 74 | 8:27 | UTSA | 24-yard field goal by Jared Sackett (#42) | 3 | 0 |
| 2nd | 14:03 | 10 | 75 | 4:25 | TEX | Roschon Johnson (#2) 11-yard touchdown reception from Hudson Card (#1), Bert Auburn (#45) kick good | 3 | 7 |
| 2nd | 10:07 | 10 | 65 | 3:56 | UTSA | Brenden Brady (#5) 2-yard touchdown run, Jared Sackett (#42) kick good | 10 | 7 |
| 2nd | 09:36 | 2 | 52 | 0:31 | UTSA | Zakhari Franklin (#4) 35-yard touchdown reception from Brenden Brady (#5), Jared Sackett (#42) kick good | 17 | 7 |
| 2nd | 05:20 | 11 | 67 | 4:08 | TEX | Bijan Robinson (#5) 3-yard touchdown run, Bert Auburn (#45) kick good | 17 | 14 |
| 2nd | 00:12 | 11 | 62 | 2:03 | TEX | 44-yard field goal by Bert Auburn (#45) | 17 | 17 |
| 3rd | 11:56 | 2 | 80 | 0:40 | TEX | Bijan Robinson (#5) 78-yard touchdown run, Bert Auburn (#45) kick good | 17 | 24 |
| 3rd | 03:21 | 13 | 74 | 5:38 | UTSA | 30-yard field goal by Jared Sackett (#42) | 20 | 24 |
| 3rd | 00:18 | 1 | 44 | 0:08 | TEX | Interception returned 44 yards for touchdown by Jahdae Barron (#23), Bert Auburn (#45) kick good | 20 | 31 |
| 4th | 09:36 | 4 | 71 | 2:10 | TEX | Bijan Robinson (#5) 41-yard touchdown run, Bert Auburn (#45) kick good | 20 | 38 |
| 4th | 04:59 | 7 | 48 | 3:21 | TEX | 26-yard field goal by Bert Auburn (#45) | 20 | 41 |
| "TOP" = time of possession. For other American football terms, see Glossary of American football. | | | | | | | UTSA 20 | TEX 41 |

=== At Texas Tech ===
Battle For The Chancellor's Spurs

| Team | 1 | 2 | 3 | 4 | OT | Total |
|---|---|---|---|---|---|---|
| No. 22 Texas | 10 | 14 | 7 | 3 | 0 | 34 |
| • Texas Tech | 7 | 7 | 10 | 10 | 3 | 37 |

- Date: September 24
- Location: Jones AT&T Stadium (Lubbock, TX)
- Game start: 2:30 p.m.
- Game attendance: 60,975
- Game weather: Sunny, 79 degrees, wind SW at 10 MPH
- Referee: David Alvarez
- TV announcers (ESPN): Dave Flemming (play-by-play), Rod Gilmore (color), and Tiffany Blackmon (sideline)
- Sources:Stats

| Statistics | Texas | Texas Tech |
|---|---|---|
| First downs | 20 | 31 |
| Total yards | 426 | 479 |
| Rushing yards | 149 | 148 |
| Passing yards | 277 | 331 |
| Turnovers | 2 | 0 |
| Time of possession | 24:06 | 34:02 |

| Team | Category | Player | Statistics |
|---|---|---|---|
| Texas | Passing | Hudson Card | 20–30, 277 yards, 2 TD, 1 INT |
| Texas | Rushing | Bijan Robinson | 16 carries, 101 yards, 2 TD |
| Texas | Receiving | Jordan Whittington | 4 receptions, 53 yards, 0 TD |
| Texas Tech | Passing | Donovan Smith | 38–56, 331 yards, 2 TD |
| Texas Tech | Rushing | SaRodorick Thompson | 17 carries, 70 yards, 1 TD |
| Texas Tech | Receiving | Myles Price | 13 receptions, 98 yards, 0 TD |

Scoring summary

| Quarter | Time | Drive | | | Team | Scoring information | Score | |
| Quarter | Time | Plays | Yards | TOP | Team | Scoring information | TEX | TTU |
|---|---|---|---|---|---|---|---|---|
| 1st | 13:36 | 3 | 62 | 01:24 | TEX | Keilan Robinson (#7) 35-yard touchdown reception from Hudson Card (#1), Bert Auburn (#45) kick good | 7 | 0 |
| 1st | 05:41 | 18 | 75 | 07:55 | TTU | Donovan Smith (#7) 4-yard touchdown run, Trey Wolff (#36) kick good | 7 | 7 |
| 1st | 01:52 | 10 | 43 | 03:49 | TEX | 40-yard field goal by Bert Auburn (#45) | 10 | 7 |
| 2nd | 12:06 | 13 | 83 | 02:54 | TTU | Tahj Brooks (#28) 17-yard touchdown reception from Donovan Smith (#7), Trey Wolff (#36) kick good | 10 | 14 |
| 2nd | 06:07 | 6 | 69 | 02:49 | TEX | Xavier Worthy (#8) 39-yard touchdown reception from Hudson Card (#1), Bert Auburn (#45) kick good | 17 | 14 |
| 2nd | 00:24 | 12 | 82 | 04:11 | TEX | Bijan Robinson (#5) 8-yard touchdown run, Bert Auburn (#45) kick good | 24 | 14 |
| 3rd | 08:16 | 15 | 59 | 04:32 | TTU | 27-yard field goal by Trey Wolff (#36) | 24 | 17 |
| 3rd | 04:27 | 8 | 75 | 03:49 | TEX | Bijan Robinson (#5) 40-yard touchdown run, Bert Auburn (#45) kick good | 31 | 17 |
| 3rd | 01:55 | 10 | 75 | 02:32 | TTU | SaRodorick Thompson (#4) 1-yard touchdown run, Trey Wolff (#36) kick good | 31 | 24 |
| 4th | 07:54 | 5 | 30 | 01:29 | TTU | Baylor Cupp (#88) 19-yard touchdown reception from Donovan Smith (#7), Trey Wolff (#36) kick good | 31 | 31 |
| 4th | 00:21 | 11 | 56 | 05:05 | TTU | 45-yard field goal by Trey Wolff (#36) | 31 | 34 |
| 4th | 00:00 | 4 | 46 | 00:21 | TEX | 48-yard field goal by Bert Auburn (#45) | 34 | 34 |
| OT | 00:00 | 5 | 23 | 00:00 | TTU | 20-yard field goal by Trey Wolff (#36) | 34 | 37 |
| "TOP" = time of possession. For other American football terms, see Glossary of American football. | | | | | | | TEX 34 | TTU 37 |

=== Vs. West Virginia ===
| Team | 1 | 2 | 3 | 4 | Total |
|---|---|---|---|---|---|
| West Virginia | 0 | 7 | 0 | 13 | 20 |
| • Texas | 14 | 14 | 7 | 3 | 38 |

- Date: October 1
- Location: Darrell K Royal–Texas Memorial Stadium (Austin, TX)
- Game start: 6:30 p.m.
- Game attendance: 100,740
- Game weather: Sunny
- Referee: Michael Vandervelde
- TV announcers (FS1): Tim Brando (play-by-play) and Spencer Tillman (color)
- Sources:Stats

| Statistics | West Virginia | Texas |
|---|---|---|
| First downs | 22 | 25 |
| Total yards | 314 | 446 |
| Rushing yards | 61 | 110 |
| Passing yards | 253 | 336 |
| Turnovers | 0 | 0 |
| Time of possession | 32:10 | 27:50 |

| Team | Category | Player | Statistics |
|---|---|---|---|
| West Virginia | Passing | JT Daniels | 29–48, 253 yards, 1 TD |
| West Virginia | Rushing | Justin Johnson Jr. | 10 carries, 42 yards, 1 TD |
| West Virginia | Receiving | Bryce Ford-Wheaton | 8 receptions, 93 yards |
| Texas | Passing | Hudson Card | 21–27, 303 yards, 3 TD |
| Texas | Rushing | Bijan Robinson | 21 carries, 101 yards, 1 TD |
| Texas | Receiving | Xavier Worthy | 7 receptions, 119 yards, 2 TD |

Scoring summary

| Quarter | Time | Drive | | | Team | Scoring information | Score | |
| Quarter | Time | Plays | Yards | TOP | Team | Scoring information | WVU | TEX |
|---|---|---|---|---|---|---|---|---|
| 1st | 06:08 | 7 | 60 | 03:08 | TEX | Xavier Worthy (#8) 15-yard touchdown reception from Hudson Card (#1), Bert Auburn (#15) kick good | 0 | 7 |
| 1st | 00:34 | 6 | 74 | 02:22 | TEX | Ja'Tavion Sanders (#0) 33-yard touchdown reception from Xavier Worthy (#8), Bert Auburn (#15) kick good | 0 | 14 |
| 2nd | 11:54 | 6 | 71 | 02:14 | TEX | Bijan Robinson (#5) 1-yard touchdown run, Bert Auburn (#15) kick good | 0 | 21 |
| 2nd | 04:22 | 6 | 87 | 03:13 | TEX | Ja'Tavion Sanders (#0) 13-yard touchdown reception from Hudson Card (#1), Bert Auburn (#15) kick good | 0 | 28 |
| 2nd | 00:13 | 13 | 83 | 04:04 | WVU | Kaden Prather (#3) 8-yard touchdown reception from JT Daniels (#18), Casey Legg (#48) kick good | 7 | 28 |
| 3rd | 13:03 | 5 | 70 | 01:51 | TEX | Xavier Worthy (#8) 44-yard touchdown reception from Hudson Card (#1), Bert Auburn (#15) kick good | 7 | 35 |
| 4th | 14:56 | 18 | 65 | 07:31 | WVU | Tony Mathis (#24) 1-yard touchdown run, Casey Legg (#48) kick good | 14 | 35 |
| 4th | 10:22 | 10 | 48 | 04:34 | TEX | 45-yard field goal by Bert Auburn (#15) | 14 | 38 |
| 4th | 04:31 | 14 | 75 | 05:51 | WVU | Justin Johnson Jr. (#26) 4-yard touchdown run, 2-point failed | 20 | 38 |
| "TOP" = time of possession. For other American football terms, see Glossary of American football. | | | | | | | WVU 20 | TEX 38 |

=== Vs. Oklahoma ===
Red River Showdown

| Team | 1 | 2 | 3 | 4 | Total |
|---|---|---|---|---|---|
| • Texas | 7 | 21 | 14 | 7 | 49 |
| Oklahoma | 0 | 0 | 0 | 0 | 0 |

- Date: October 8
- Location: Cotton Bowl (Dallas, TX)
- Game start: 11:00 a.m.
- Game attendance: 92,100
- Game weather: 71 degrees, Sunny, wind SW at 8 mph
- Referee: Derek Anderson
- TV announcers (ABC): Joe Tessitore (play-by-play), Greg McElroy (color), and Katie George (sideline)
- Sources:Stats

| Statistics | Texas | Oklahoma |
|---|---|---|
| First downs | 36 | 11 |
| Total yards | 585 | 195 |
| Rushing yards | 296 | 156 |
| Passing yards | 289 | 39 |
| Turnovers | 1 | 2 |
| Time of possession | 32:59 | 27:01 |

| Team | Category | Player | Statistics |
|---|---|---|---|
| Texas | Passing | Quinn Ewers | 21–31, 289 yards, 4 TD, 1 INT |
| Texas | Rushing | Bijan Robinson | 22 carries, 130 yards, 2 TD |
| Texas | Receiving | Jordan Whittington | 5 receptions, 97 yards |
| Oklahoma | Passing | Davis Beville | 6–12, 38 yards, 1 INT |
| Oklahoma | Rushing | Jalil Farooq | 5 carries, 60 yards |
| Oklahoma | Receiving | Brayden Willis | 2 receptions, 25 yards |

Largest margin of victory versus Oklahoma.
Oklahoma was shutout for the first time since November 7, 1998 versus Texas A&M.
Texas shutout Oklahoma for the first time since October 9, 1965.
Most points scored (49) versus Oklahoma all-time, surpassing the 48 scored October 6, 2018.

Scoring summary

| Quarter | Time | Drive | | | Team | Scoring information | Score | |
| Quarter | Time | Plays | Yards | TOP | Team | Scoring information | TEX | OU |
|---|---|---|---|---|---|---|---|---|
| 1st | 6:48 | 12 | 90 | 4:31 | TEX | Bijan Robinson (#5) 2-yard touchdown run, Bert Auburn (#15) kick good | 7 | 0 |
| 2nd | 12:40 | 8 | 92 | 3:03 | TEX | Xavier Worthy (#8) 10-yard touchdown reception from Quinn Ewers (#3), Bert Auburn (#15) kick good | 14 | 0 |
| 2nd | 7:31 | 9 | 80 | 3:10 | TEX | Keilan Robinson (#7) 15-yard touchdown reception from Quinn Ewers (#3), Bert Auburn (#15) kick good | 21 | 0 |
| 2nd | 0:18 | 9 | 79 | 2:48 | TEX | Ja'Tavion Sanders (#0) 24-yard touchdown reception from Quinn Ewers (#3), Bert Auburn (#15) kick good | 28 | 0 |
| 3rd | 5:01 | 7 | 76 | 3:07 | TEX | Bijan Robinson (#5) 11-yard touchdown run, Bert Auburn (#15) kick good | 35 | 0 |
| 3rd | 1:57 | 6 | 47 | 2:07 | TEX | Ja'Tavion Sanders (#0) 18-yard touchdown reception from Quinn Ewers (#3), Bert Auburn (#15) kick good | 42 | 0 |
| 4th | 12:11 | 5 | 54 | 2:37 | TEX | Jonathon Brooks (#24) 18-yard touchdown run, Bert Auburn (#15) kick good | 49 | 0 |
| "TOP" = time of possession. For other American football terms, see Glossary of American football. | | | | | | | TEX 49 | OU 0 |

=== Vs. Iowa State ===
| Team | 1 | 2 | 3 | 4 | Total |
|---|---|---|---|---|---|
| Iowa State | 7 | 0 | 7 | 7 | 21 |
| • No. 22т Texas | 0 | 14 | 3 | 7 | 24 |

- Date: October 15
- Location: Darrell K Royal–Texas Memorial Stadium (Austin, TX)
- Game start: 11:00 a.m.
- Game attendance: 100,072
- Game weather: 81 degrees, Sunny, wind N at 6 mph
- Referee: Tuta Salaam
- TV announcers (ABC): Mark Jones (play-by-play), Robert Griffin III (color), and Quint Kessenich (sideline)
- Sources:Stats

| Statistics | Iowa State | Texas |
|---|---|---|
| First downs | 20 | 23 |
| Total yards | 403 | 363 |
| Rushing yards | 74 | 191 |
| Passing yards | 329 | 172 |
| Turnovers | 2 | 0 |
| Time of possession | 28:43 | 31:17 |

| Team | Category | Player | Statistics |
|---|---|---|---|
| Iowa State | Passing | Hunter Dekkers | 25–36, 329 yards, 2 TD, 1 INT |
| Iowa State | Rushing | Hunter Dekkers | 8 carries, 38 yards, 1 TD |
| Iowa State | Receiving | Xavier Hutchinson | 10 receptions, 154 yards |
| Texas | Passing | Quinn Ewers | 17–26, 172 yards, 3 TD |
| Texas | Rushing | Bijan Robinson | 28 carries, 141 yards |
| Texas | Receiving | Xavier Worthy | 8 receptions, 72 yards, 2 TD |

Scoring summary

| Quarter | Time | Drive | | | Team | Scoring information | Score | |
| Quarter | Time | Plays | Yards | TOP | Team | Scoring information | ISU | TEX |
|---|---|---|---|---|---|---|---|---|
| 1st | 00:57 | 11 | 84 | 05:28 | ISU | Jaylin Noel (#13) 5-yard touchdown reception from Hunter Dekkers (#12), Jace Gilbert (#20) kick good | 7 | 0 |
| 2nd | 05:48 | 9 | 80 | 03:20 | TEX | Xavier Worthy (#8) 15-yard touchdown reception from Quinn Ewers (#3), Bert Auburn (#15) kick good | 7 | 7 |
| 2nd | 00:13 | 9 | 80 | 03:28 | TEX | Jordan Whittington (#4) 5-yard touchdown reception from Quinn Ewers (#3), Bert Auburn (#15) kick good | 7 | 14 |
| 3rd | 10:07 | 13 | 75 | 04:43 | TEX | 45-yard field goal by Bert Auburn (#15) | 7 | 17 |
| 3rd | 04:27 | 2 | 62 | 00:37 | ISU | Jaylin Noel (#13) 54-yard touchdown reception from Hunter Dekkers (#12), Jace Gilbert (#20) kick good | 14 | 17 |
| 4th | 14:56 | 13 | 73 | 05:39 | ISU | Hunter Dekkers (#12) 11-yard touchdown run, Jace Gilbert (#20) kick good | 21 | 17 |
| 4th | 04:43 | 11 | 75 | 06:15 | TEX | Xavier Worthy (#8) 3-yard touchdown reception from Quinn Ewers (#3), Bert Auburn (#15) kick good | 21 | 24 |
| "TOP" = time of possession. For other American football terms, see Glossary of American football. | | | | | | | ISU 21 | TEX 24 |

=== At No. 11 Oklahoma State ===
| Team | 1 | 2 | 3 | 4 | Total |
|---|---|---|---|---|---|
| No. 20 Texas | 14 | 17 | 3 | 0 | 34 |
| • No. 11 Oklahoma State | 10 | 14 | 3 | 14 | 41 |

- Date: October 22
- Location: Boone Pickens Stadium (Stillwater, OK)
- Game start: 2:30 p.m.
- Game attendance: 55,509
- Game weather: 86 degrees, Sunny, wind S at 23 MPH
- Referee: Kevin Mar
- TV announcers (ABC): Dave Pasch (play-by-play), Dusty Dvoracek (color), and Tom Luginbill (sideline)
- Sources:Stats

| Statistics | Texas | Oklahoma State |
|---|---|---|
| First downs | 21 | 32 |
| Total yards | 523 | 535 |
| Rushing yards | 204 | 142 |
| Passing yards | 319 | 393 |
| Turnovers | 3 | 2 |
| Time of possession | 27:00 | 33:00 |

| Team | Category | Player | Statistics |
|---|---|---|---|
| Texas | Passing | Quinn Ewers | 19–49, 319 yards, 2 TD, 3 INT |
| Texas | Rushing | Bijan Robinson | 24 carries, 140 yards, 1 TD |
| Texas | Receiving | Xavier Worthy | 4 receptions, 78 yards, 1 TD |
| Oklahoma State | Passing | Spencer Sanders | 34–57, 391 yards, 2 TD, 1 INT |
| Oklahoma State | Rushing | Jaden Nixon | 8 carries, 64 yards |
| Oklahoma State | Receiving | Bryson Green | 5 receptions, 133 yards, 1 TD |

Scoring summary

| Quarter | Time | Drive | | | Team | Scoring information | Score | |
| Quarter | Time | Plays | Yards | TOP | Team | Scoring information | TEX | OSU |
|---|---|---|---|---|---|---|---|---|
| 1st | 13:21 | 4 | -2 | 0:51 | OSU | 48-yard field goal by Tanner Brown | 0 | 3 |
| 1st | 12:01 | 4 | 71 | 1:14 | TEX | Bijan Robinson 42-yard touchdown run, Bert Auburn kick good | 7 | 3 |
| 1st | 9:39 | 6 | 75 | 2:22 | OSU | Dominic Richardson 4-yard touchdown run, Tanner Brown kick good | 7 | 10 |
| 1st | 4:21 | 4 | 52 | 1:51 | TEX | Xavier Worthy 12-yard touchdown reception from Quinn Ewers, Bert Auburn kick good | 14 | 10 |
| 2nd | 13:28 | 2 | 42 | 0:38 | TEX | Bijan Robinson 41-yard touchdown reception from Quinn Ewers, Bert Auburn kick good | 21 | 10 |
| 2nd | 11:16 | 8 | 75 | 2:12 | OSU | Dominic Richardson 1-yard touchdown run, Tanner Brown kick good | 21 | 17 |
| 2nd | 8:04 | 7 | 40 | 3:02 | TEX | 37-yard field goal by Bert Auburn | 24 | 17 |
| 2nd | 3:43 | 7 | 80 | 1:32 | TEX | Roschon Johnson 52-yard touchdown run, Bert Auburn kick good | 31 | 17 |
| 2nd | 2:41 | 3 | 85 | 0:57 | OSU | Dominic Richardson 2-yard touchdown run, Tanner Brown kick good | 31 | 24 |
| 3rd | 2:10 | 4 | 5 | 1:07 | TEX | 33-yard field goal by Bert Auburn | 34 | 24 |
| 3rd | 0:29 | 7 | 52 | 1:41 | OSU | 40-yard field goal by Tanner Brown | 34 | 27 |
| 4th | 9:54 | 12 | 66 | 4:53 | OSU | Brennan Presley 10-yard touchdown reception from Spencer Sanders, Tanner Brown kick good | 34 | 34 |
| 4th | 3:09 | 6 | 72 | 1:48 | OSU | Bryson Green 41-yard touchdown reception from Spencer Sanders, Tanner Brown kick good | 34 | 41 |
| "TOP" = time of possession. For other American football terms, see Glossary of American football. | | | | | | | TEX 34 | OSU 41 |

=== At No. 13 Kansas State ===
| Team | 1 | 2 | 3 | 4 | Total |
|---|---|---|---|---|---|
| • No. 24 Texas | 14 | 17 | 0 | 3 | 34 |
| No. 13 Kansas State | 7 | 3 | 7 | 10 | 27 |

- Date: November 5
- Location: Bill Snyder Family Football Stadium (Manhattan, KS)
- Game start: 6:00 p.m.
- Game attendance: 51,216
- Game weather: 57 degrees, clear, wind SW at 15 MPH
- Referee: Steve Baron
- TV announcers (FS1): Jason Benetti (play-by-play), Brock Huard (color)
- Sources:Stats

| Statistics | Texas | Kansas State |
|---|---|---|
| First downs | 22 | 25 |
| Total yards | 466 | 468 |
| Rushing yards | 269 | 139 |
| Passing yards | 197 | 329 |
| Turnovers | 2 | 2 |
| Time of possession | 27:27 | 32:33 |

| Team | Category | Player | Statistics |
|---|---|---|---|
| Texas | Passing | Quinn Ewers | 18–31, 197 yards, 2 TD |
| Texas | Rushing | Bijan Robinson | 30 carries, 209 yards, 1 TD |
| Texas | Receiving | Ja’Tavion Sanders | 5 receptions, 54 yards |
| Kansas State | Passing | Adrian Martinez | 24–36, 329 yards, 2 TD, 1 INT |
| Kansas State | Rushing | Deuce Vaughn | 19 carries, 73 yards |
| Kansas State | Receiving | Malik Knowles | 3 receptions, 93 yards |

Scoring summary

| Quarter | Time | Drive | | | Team | Scoring information | Score | |
| Quarter | Time | Plays | Yards | TOP | Team | Scoring information | TEX | KSU |
|---|---|---|---|---|---|---|---|---|
| 1st | 12:30 | 8 | 75 | 2:30 | TEX | Bijan Robinson 36-yard touchdown run, Bert Auburn kick good | 7 | 0 |
| 1st | 8:41 | 7 | 65 | 3:42 | KSU | Deuce Vaughn 28-yard touchdown reception from Adrian Martinez, Ty Zentner kick good | 7 | 7 |
| 1st | 65:20 | 8 | 75 | 3:21 | TEX | Roschon Johnson 9-yard touchdown run, Bert Auburn kick good | 14 | 7 |
| 2nd | 13:40 | 16 | 84 | 6:33 | KSU | 22-yard field goal by Ty Zentner | 14 | 10 |
| 2nd | 10:24 | 8 | 75 | 3:16 | TEX | Xavier Worthy 13-yard touchdown reception from Quinn Ewers, Bert Auburn kick good | 21 | 10 |
| 2nd | 1:35 | 7 | 74 | 2:02 | TEX | 28-yard field goal by Bert Auburn | 24 | 10 |
| 2nd | 0:13 | 7 | 27 | 0:54 | TEX | Xavier Worthy 3-yard touchdown reception from Quinn Ewers, Bert Auburn kick good | 31 | 10 |
| 3rd | 8:37 | 4 | 24 | 1:57 | KSU | Adrian Martinez 1-yard touchdown run, Ty Zentner kick good | 31 | 17 |
| 4th | 14:54 | 4 | 71 | 1:03 | KSU | Kade Warner 25-yard touchdown reception from Adrian Martinez, Ty Zentner kick good | 31 | 24 |
| 4th | 10:29 | 11 | 64 | 4:25 | TEX | 29-yard field goal by Bert Auburn | 34 | 24 |
| 4th | 4:26 | 13 | 65 | 6:03 | KSU | 28-yard field goal by Ty Zentner | 34 | 27 |
| "TOP" = time of possession. For other American football terms, see Glossary of American football. | | | | | | | TEX 34 | KSU 27 |

=== Vs. No. 4 TCU ===
TCU–Texas football rivalry

| Team | 1 | 2 | 3 | 4 | Total |
|---|---|---|---|---|---|
| • No. 4 TCU | 0 | 3 | 7 | 7 | 17 |
| No. 18 Texas | 0 | 0 | 3 | 7 | 10 |

- Date: November 12
- Location: Darrell K Royal–Texas Memorial Stadium (Austin, TX)
- Game start: 6:30 p.m.
- Game attendance: 104,203
- Game weather: Sunny
- Referee: Michael Vandervelde
- TV announcers (ABC): Chris Fowler (play-by-play), Kirk Herbstreit (color), and Holly Rowe (sideline)
- Sources: Stats

| Statistics | TCU | Texas |
|---|---|---|
| First downs | 20 | 14 |
| Total yards | 283 | 199 |
| Rushing yards | 159 | 28 |
| Passing yards | 124 | 171 |
| Turnovers | 1 | 1 |
| Time of possession | 37:22 | 22:38 |

| Team | Category | Player | Statistics |
|---|---|---|---|
| TCU | Passing | Max Duggan | 19–29, 124 yards, 1 TD |
| TCU | Rushing | Kendre Miller | 21 carries, 138 yards, 1 TD |
| TCU | Receiving | Quentin Johnston | 3 receptions, 66 yards, 1 TD |
| Texas | Passing | Quinn Ewers | 19–39, 171 yards, 1 INT |
| Texas | Rushing | Bijan Robinson | 12 carries, 29 yards |
| Texas | Receiving | Jordan Whittington | 6 receptions, 78 yards |

ESPN College GameDay returned to Austin for the 2nd time of the season, and 9th time overall.

Scoring summary

| Quarter | Time | Drive | | | Team | Scoring information | Score | |
| Quarter | Time | Plays | Yards | TOP | Team | Scoring information | TCU | TEX |
|---|---|---|---|---|---|---|---|---|
| 2nd | 1:20 | 14 | 57 | 6:45 | TCU | 34-yard field goal by Griffin Kell | 3 | 0 |
| 3rd | 5:08 | 4 | 93 | 1:50 | TCU | Kendre Miller 75-yard touchdown run, Griffin Kell kick good | 10 | 0 |
| 3rd | 0:58 | 12 | 71 | 4:10 | TEX | 22-yard field goal by Bert Auburn | 10 | 3 |
| 4th | 12:36 | 9 | 80 | 3:18 | TCU | Quentin Johnston 31-yard touchdown reception from Max Duggan, Griffin Kell kick good | 17 | 3 |
| 4th | 4:25 | | | | TEX | Fumble recovery returned 48 yards for touchdown by Jahdae Barron, Bert Auburn kick good | 17 | 10 |
| "TOP" = time of possession. For other American football terms, see Glossary of American football. | | | | | | | TCU 17 | TEX 10 |

=== At Kansas ===
| Team | 1 | 2 | 3 | 4 | Total |
|---|---|---|---|---|---|
| • Texas | 14 | 17 | 10 | 14 | 55 |
| Kansas | 0 | 0 | 7 | 7 | 14 |

- Date: November 19
- Location: David Booth Kansas Memorial Stadium (Lawrence, KS)
- Game start: 2:30 p.m.
- Game attendance: 38,246
- Game weather: 36, Sunny, Wind NW at 15 mph
- Referee: Kevin Boitmann
- TV announcers (FS1): Noah Eagle (play-by-play), Mark Helfrich (color)
- Sources:Stats

| Statistics | Texas | Kansas |
|---|---|---|
| First downs | 28 | 15 |
| Total yards | 539 | 346 |
| Rushing yards | 427 | 104 |
| Passing yards | 112 | 242 |
| Turnovers | 0 | 1 |
| Time of possession | 31:58 | 28:02 |

| Team | Category | Player | Statistics |
|---|---|---|---|
| Texas | Passing | Quinn Ewers | 12–21, 107 yards, 1 TD |
| Texas | Rushing | Bijan Robinson | 25 carries, 243 yards, 4 TD |
| Texas | Receiving | Jordan Whittington | 6 receptions, 56 yards |
| Kansas | Passing | Jalon Daniels | 17–26, 230 yards, 2 TD, 1 INT |
| Kansas | Rushing | Devin Neal | 13 carries, 51 yards |
| Kansas | Receiving | Quentin Skinner | 4 receptions, 98 yards |

Scoring summary

| Quarter | Time | Drive | | | Team | Scoring information | Score | |
| Quarter | Time | Plays | Yards | TOP | Team | Scoring information | TEX | KU |
|---|---|---|---|---|---|---|---|---|
| 1st | 07:50 | 9 | 68 | 03:58 | TEX | Bijan Robinson 2-yard touchdown run, Bert Auburn kick good | 7 | 0 |
| 1st | 05:33 | 2 | 28 | 00:26 | TEX | Bijan Robinson 17-yard touchdown run, Bert Auburn kick good | 14 | 0 |
| 2nd | 12:18 | 12 | 46 | 04:40 | TEX | 28-yard field goal by Bert Auburn | 17 | 0 |
| 2nd | 04:56 | 7 | 80 | 02:27 | TEX | Keilan Robinson 15-yard touchdown reception from Quinn Ewers, Bert Auburn (#15) kick good | 24 | 0 |
| 2nd | 00:00 | 9 | 60 | 02:08 | TEX | Bijan Robinson 1-yard touchdown run, Bert Auburn kick good | 31 | 0 |
| 3rd | 11:03 | 5 | 61 | 01:51 | TEX | Bijan Robinson 32-yard touchdown run, Bert Auburn kick good | 38 | 0 |
| 3rd | 05:16 | 10 | 28 | 04:12 | TEX | 40-yard field goal by Bert Auburn | 41 | 0 |
| 3rd | 01:55 | 7 | 80 | 03:16 | KU | Torry Locklin 14-yard touchdown reception from Jalon Daniels, Owen Piepergerdes kick good | 41 | 7 |
| 4th | 11:36 | 12 | 65 | 05:11 | TEX | Jonathon Brooks 3-yard touchdown run, Bert Auburn kick good | 48 | 7 |
| 4th | 10:33 | 4 | 74 | 00:59 | KU | Luke Grimm 12-yard touchdown reception from Jalon Daniels, Owen Piepergerdes kick good | 48 | 14 |
| 4th | 09:09 | 3 | 75 | 01:24 | TEX | Jonathon Brooks 70-yard touchdown run, Bert Auburn kick good | 55 | 14 |
| "TOP" = time of possession. For other American football terms, see Glossary of American football. | | | | | | | Tex 55 | KU 14 |

=== Vs. Baylor ===
| Team | 1 | 2 | 3 | 4 | Total |
|---|---|---|---|---|---|
| Baylor | 9 | 10 | 0 | 9 | 28 |
| • No. 23 Texas | 14 | 3 | 7 | 14 | 38 |

- Date: November 25
- Location: Darrell K Royal–Texas Memorial Stadium (Austin, TX)
- Game start: 11:00 a.m.
- Game attendance: 94,076
- Game weather: Rain
- Referee: Kevin Mar
- TV announcers (ESPN): Mark Jones (play-by-play), Robert Griffin III (color), Quint Kessenich (sideline)
- Sources: Stats

| Statistics | Baylor | Texas |
|---|---|---|
| First downs | 18 | 22 |
| Total yards | 280 | 402 |
| Rushing yards | 101 | 208 |
| Passing yards | 179 | 194 |
| Turnovers | 1 | 1 |
| Time of possession | 33:24 | 26:36 |

| Team | Category | Player | Statistics |
|---|---|---|---|
| Baylor | Passing | Blake Shapen | 18–36, 179 yards, 2 TD, 1 INT |
| Baylor | Rushing | Richard Reese | 15 carries, 54 yards |
| Baylor | Receiving | Josh Cameron | 4 receptions, 48 yards |
| Texas | Passing | Quinn Ewers | 12–16, 194 yards |
| Texas | Rushing | Bijan Robinson | 29 carries, 179 yards, 2 TDs |
| Texas | Receiving | Ja'Tavion Sanders | 4 receptions, 65 yards |

Scoring summary

| Quarter | Time | Drive | | | Team | Scoring information | Score | |
| Quarter | Time | Plays | Yards | TOP | Team | Scoring information | Baylor | Texas |
|---|---|---|---|---|---|---|---|---|
| 1st | 9:44 | | | | BAY | Intentional Grounding in the endzone on Quinn Ewers | 2 | 0 |
| 1st | 6:54 | 5 | 62 | 2:43 | BAY | Jaylen Ellis 47-yard touchdown reception from Blake Shapen, John Mayers kick good | 9 | 0 |
| 1st | 3:54 | 7 | 75 | 3:00 | TEX | Quinn Ewers 3-yard touchdown run, Will Stone kick good | 9 | 7 |
| 1st | 1:35 | 3 | 29 | 1:20 | TEX | Bijan Robinson 2-yard touchdown run, Will Stone kick good | 9 | 14 |
| 2nd | 7:54 | 18 | 63 | 8:41 | BAY | 30-yard field goal by John Mayers | 12 | 14 |
| 2nd | 5:50 | 6 | 55 | 2:04 | TEX | 38-yard field goal by Bert Auburn | 12 | 17 |
| 2nd | 0:40 | 5 | 45 | 0:32 | BAY | Ben Sims 14-yard touchdown reception from Blake Shapen, John Mayers kick good | 19 | 17 |
| 3rd | 2:21 | 10 | 78 | 3:19 | TEX | Roschon Johnson 1-yard touchdown run, Bert Auburn kick good | 19 | 24 |
| 4th | 13:30 | | | | BAY | Fumble recovery returned 16 yards for touchdown by Gabe Hall, 2-point pass good | 27 | 24 |
| 4th | 8:25 | 11 | 75 | 5:05 | TEX | Bijan Robinson 1-yard touchdown run, Bert Auburn kick good | 27 | 31 |
| 4th | 3:48 | 6 | 42 | 2:40 | TEX | Roschon Johnson 11-yard touchdown run, Bert Auburn kick good | 27 | 38 |
| "TOP" = time of possession. For other American football terms, see Glossary of American football. | | | | | | | BAY 27 | TEX 38 |

=== Vs. No. 12 Washington (Alamo Bowl) ===
2022 Alamo Bowl

| Team | 1 | 2 | 3 | 4 | Total |
|---|---|---|---|---|---|
| No. 20 Texas | 3 | 0 | 7 | 10 | 20 |
| • No. 12 Washington | 10 | 3 | 7 | 7 | 27 |

- Date: December 29
- Location: Alamodome (San Antonio, TX)
- Game start: 8:00 p.m.
- Game attendance: 62,730
- Game weather: Indoor
- Referee: Gary Patterson
- TV announcers (ESPN): Tom Hart (play-by-play), Jordan Rogers (color), Cole Cubelic (sideline)
- Sources:Stats

| Statistics | Texas | Washington |
|---|---|---|
| First downs | 19 | 25 |
| Total yards | 420 | 445 |
| Rushing yards | 51 | 158 |
| Passing yards | 369 | 287 |
| Turnovers | 0 | 1 |
| Time of possession | 24:14 | 35:46 |

| Team | Category | Player | Statistics |
|---|---|---|---|
| Texas | Passing | Quinn Ewers | 31–47, 369 yards, 1 TD |
| Texas | Rushing | Keilan Robinson | 8 carries, 27 yards |
| Texas | Receiving | Casey Cain | 4 receptions, 108 yards |
| Washington | Passing | Michael Penix Jr. | 32–54, 287 yards, 2 TDs, 1 INT |
| Washington | Rushing | Wayne Taulapapa | 14 carries, 108 yards, 1 TD |
| Washington | Receiving | Jalen McMillan | 8 receptions, 58 yards, 1 TD |

Scoring summary

| Quarter | Time | Drive | | | Team | Scoring information | Score | |
| Quarter | Time | Plays | Yards | TOP | Team | Scoring information | TEX | WASH |
|---|---|---|---|---|---|---|---|---|
| 1st | 11:44 | 4 | 1 | 0:56 | WASH | 46-yard field goal by Peyton Henry | 0 | 3 |
| 1st | 7:52 | 10 | 78 | 3:46 | TEX | 30-yard field goal by Bert Auburn | 3 | 3 |
| 1st | 3:17 | 10 | 88 | 4:30 | WASH | Wayne Taulapapa 42-yard touchdown run, Peyton Henry kick good | 3 | 10 |
| 2nd | 0:00 | 16 | 74 | 4:50 | WASH | 23-yard field goal by Peyton Henry | 3 | 13 |
| 3rd | 12:31 | 7 | 75 | 2:29 | TEX | Jonathon Brooks 34-yard touchdown reception from Quinn Ewers, Bert Auburn kick good | 10 | 13 |
| 3rd | 6:44 | 13 | 75 | 5:47 | WASH | Taj Davis 6-yard touchdown reception from Michael Penix Jr., Peyton Henry kick good | 10 | 20 |
| 4th | 13:08 | 14 | 90 | 6:57 | WASH | Jalen McMillan 8-yard touchdown reception from Michael Penix Jr., Peyton Henry kick good | 10 | 27 |
| 4th | 9:50 | 11 | 74 | 3:11 | TEX | Jonathon Brooks 3-yard touchdown run, Bert Auburn kick good | 17 | 27 |
| 4th | 1:40 | 10 | 55 | 2:41 | TEX | 26-yard field goal by Bert Auburn | 20 | 27 |
| "TOP" = time of possession. For other American football terms, see Glossary of American football. | | | | | | | TEX 20 | WASH 27 |

== Statistics ==
=== Team statistics ===
Team Statistics
| | Texas | Opponents |
|---|---|---|
| Total Points | 448 | 281 |
| Total Points per game | 34.46 | 21.62 |
| Total Touchdowns | 55 | 33 |
| Total First Downs | 298 | 276 |
| Rushing | 124 | 95 |
| Passing | 147 | 159 |
| Penalties | 27 | 22 |
| Rushing Total Yards | 2,4446 yds | 1,634 yds |
| Rushing yards for loss | 259 yds | 286 yds |
| Rushing Attempts | 470 | 469 |
| Average Per Rushing ATTs | 5.2 | 3.5 |
| Average Per Game | 188.2 | 125.7 |
| Rushing TDs | 29 | 14 |
| Passing total yards | 3,138 yds | 3,155 yds |
| Comp–Att-INTs | 248-405-7 | 315-501-10 |
| Average Per Game | 241.38 | 242.69 |
| Average per attempt | 7.75 | 6.3 |
| Passing TDs | 22 | 18 |
| Total Offensive plays | 875 | 970 |
| Total Yards | 5,584 yds | 4,789 yds |
| Average per plays | 6.4 | 4.9 |
| Average per games | 429.5 | 368.4 |
| Kickoff Returns: # – Yards- TDs | 21-472-0 | 35-603-0 |
| Average per kickoff | 22.48 | 17.23 |
| Punt Returns: # – Yards- TDs | 20-186-1 | 11-34-0 |
| Average per punt | 9.3 | 3.4 |
| INT Returns: # – Yards- TDs | 9-167-2 | 7-89-0 |
| Average per interceptions | 18.6 | 3.09 |
| Kicking - Punt Yards | 47-1909 | 66-2568 |
| Punt average per games | 40.62 | 38.91 |
| Punt net. average | 38.62 | 34.27 |
| FG: FGM - FGA | 21-26 | 16-21 |
| Onside kicks | 0-1 | 1-2 |
| Penalties – Yards | 79-615 | 76-580 |
| Average per games (YRDS) | 47.31 | 44.62 |
| Time of possession | 05:55:02 | 07:02:52 |
| Average per game | 27:19 | 32:32 |
| Miscellaneous: 3rd–Down Conversion % | 64-165 (38.79%) | 88-214 (41.12%) |
| Miscellaneous:4th–Down Conversion % | 12-22 (54.55%) | 20-35 (57.14%) |
| Sacks - Yards | 27-173 | 19-148 |
| Fumbles – Fumbles Lost | 9-5 | 11-4 |
| Miscellaneous: Yards | 0 | 0 |
| Red Zone: Score attempts | 52-58 | 32-41 |
| Red Zone: Touchdowns | 36-58 | 21-41 |

=== Individual statistics ===
==== Offense ====
Passing statistics
| # | NAME | POS | RAT | CMP | ATT | YDS | AVG/G | CMP% | TD | INT | LONG |
|---|---|---|---|---|---|---|---|---|---|---|---|
| 3 | Quinn Ewers | QB | 132.6 | 172 | 296 | 2177 | 217.7 | 58.1% | 15 | 6 | 49 |
| 1 | Hudson Card | QB | 158.1 | 75 | 108 | 928 | 77.33 | 69.44% | 6 | 1 | 45 |
| 8 | Xavier Worthy | WR | 707.2 | 1 | 1 | 33 | 2.75 | 100.00% | 1 | 0 | 33 |
| | TOTALS | | 140.8 | 248 | 405 | 3138 | 241.38 | 61.23% | 22 | 7 | 49 |

Rushing statistics
| # | NAME | POS | ATT | GAIN | NET | AVG | TD | LONG | AVG/G |
|---|---|---|---|---|---|---|---|---|---|
| 5 | Bijan Robinson | RB | 258 | 1622 | 1580 | 6.1 | 18 | 78 | 131.67 |
| 2 | Roschon Johnson | RB | 93 | 563 | 554 | 6 | 5 | 52 | 46.17 |
| 24 | Jonathon Brooks | RB | 30 | 204 | 197 | 6.6 | 5 | 70 | 28.14 |
| 7 | Keilan Robinson | RB | 25 | 94 | 86 | 3.4 | 0 | 26 | 6.62 |
| 1 | Hudson Card | QB | 17 | 118 | 46 | 2.7 | 0 | 32 | 3.83 |
| 23 | Jaydon Blue | RB | 15 | 35 | 33 | 2.2 | 0 | 10 | 4.13 |
| 8 | Xavier Worthy | WR | 2 | 14 | 14 | 7 | 0 | 7 | 1.17 |
| 3 | Quinn Ewers | QB | 24 | 55 | -52 | -2.2 | 1 | 16 | -5.20 |
| | Team | | 6 | 0 | -12 | -2 | 0 | 0 | -1 |
| | TOTALS | | 470 | 2705 | 2446 | 5.2 | 29 | 78 | 188.15 |

Receiving statistics
| # | NAME | POS | CTH | YDS | AVG | TD | LONG | AVG/G |
|---|---|---|---|---|---|---|---|---|
| 8 | Xavier Worthy | WR | 60 | 760 | 12.67 | 9 | 46 | 58.46 |
| 4 | Jordan Whittington | WR | 50 | 652 | 13.04 | 1 | 32 | 50.15 |
| 0 | Ja'Tavion Sanders | TE | 54 | 613 | 11.35 | 5 | 37 | 47.15 |
| 5 | Bijan Robinson | RB | 19 | 314 | 16.53 | 2 | 42 | 26.17 |
| 7 | Keilan Robinson | RB | 20 | 219 | 10.95 | 3 | 35 | 16.85 |
| 88 | Casey Cain | WR | 8 | 201 | 25.13 | 0 | 49 | 15.46 |
| 2 | Roschon Johnson | RB | 14 | 128 | 9.14 | 1 | 38 | 10.67 |
| 85 | Gunnar Helm | TE | 5 | 44 | 8.80 | 0 | 19 | 3.38 |
| 16 | Tarique Milton | WR | 2 | 40 | 20 | 0 | 28 | 3.33 |
| 9 | Jahleel Billingsley | TE | 3 | 38 | 12.67 | 0 | 20 | 9.5 |
| 17 | Savion Red | WR | 6 | 34 | 5.67 | 0 | 11 | 3.78 |
| 11 | Brenen Thompson | WR | 1 | 32 | 32 | 0 | 32 | 4 |
| 83 | Gabe Sulser | WR | 2 | 10 | 5 | 0 | 6 | 2 |
| 21 | Troy Omeire | WR | 1 | 9 | 9 | 0 | 9 | 2.25 |
| 15 | Agiye Hall | WR | 1 | 7 | 7 | 0 | 7 | 2.33 |
| | TOTALS | | 248 | 3138 | 12.65 | 22 | 49 | 241.38 |

==== Defense ====
Defense statistics
| # | NAME | POS | SOLO | AST | TOT | TFL-YDS | INT | BU | QBH | FR | FF | BLK | SAF | TD |
|---|---|---|---|---|---|---|---|---|---|---|---|---|---|---|
| 41 | Jaylan Ford | LB | 61 | 58 | 119 | 10.0-41 | 4 | 2 | 2 | 2 | 3 | 0 | 0 | 0 |
| 0 | DeMarvion Overshown | LB | 49 | 47 | 96 | 10.0-37 | 0 | 5 | 2 | 0 | 0 | 0 | 0 | 0 |
| 28 | Jerrin Thompson | DB | 50 | 33 | 83 | 0.5-1 | 1 | 7 | 0 | 0 | 0 | 0 | 0 | 0 |
| 23 | Jahdae Barron | DB | 43 | 35 | 78 | 11.5-32 | 2 | 3 | 1 | 1 | 0 | 0 | 0 | 2 |
| 11 | Anthony Cook | DB | 35 | 26 | 61 | 3.5-8 | 0 | 5 | 0 | 0 | 1 | 0 | 0 | 0 |
| 18 | Ovie Oghoufo | EDGE | 20 | 34 | 54 | 8.5-22 | 0 | 3 | 4 | 0 | 2 | 0 | 0 | 0 |
| 6 | Ryan Watts | DB | 33 | 18 | 51 | 4.0-17 | 1 | 3 | 1 | 0 | 0 | 0 | 0 | 0 |
| 88 | Barryn Sorrell | EDGE | 16 | 28 | 44 | 9.0-55 | 0 | 1 | 7 | 0 | 1 | 0 | 0 | 0 |
| 2 | Diamonte Tucker-Dorsey | LB | 22 | 22 | 44 | 3.0-13 | 0 | 1 | 1 | 0 | 1 | 0 | 0 | 0 |
| 98 | Moro Ojomo | DL | 16 | 16 | 32 | 5.5-29 | 0 | 0 | 2 | 0 | 0 | 0 | 0 | 0 |
| 93 | T'Vondre Sweat | DL | 10 | 20 | 30 | 2.5-6 | 0 | 4 | 7 | 0 | 0 | 0 | 0 | 0 |
| 99 | Keondre Coburn | DL | 10 | 18 | 28 | 3.0-11 | 0 | 0 | 2 | 0 | 1 | 0 | 0 | 0 |
| 90 | Byron Murphy II | DL | 9 | 17 | 26 | 3.0-13 | 0 | 0 | 2 | 0 | 0 | 0 | 0 | 0 |
| 36 | Michael Taaffe | DB | 13 | 13 | 26 | 0.5-0 | 0 | 1 | 0 | 0 | 0 | 0 | 0 | 0 |
| 21 | Kitan Crawford | DB | 17 | 8 | 25 | 0-0 | 0 | 2 | 0 | 0 | 0 | 1 | 0 | 1 |
| 5 | D'Shawn Jamison | DB | 21 | 4 | 25 | 2.0-3 | 2 | 7 | 0 | 0 | 0 | 1 | 0 | 0 |
| 13 | Jaylon Guilbeau | DB | 8 | 11 | 19 | 0.5-1 | 0 | 2 | 4 | 0 | 0 | 0 | 0 | 0 |
| 43 | Jett Bush | LB | 10 | 7 | 17 | 0-0 | 0 | 0 | 0 | 0 | 0 | 0 | 0 | 0 |
| 95 | Alfred Collins | DL | 7 | 10 | 17 | 3.0-10 | 0 | 0 | 3 | 0 | 0 | 0 | 0 | 0 |
| 33 | David Gbenda | LB | 8 | 4 | 12 | 0-0 | 0 | 0 | 0 | 0 | 0 | 0 | 0 | 0 |
| 37 | Morice Blackwell Jr. | DB | 7 | 4 | 11 | 1.0-1 | 0 | 1 | 1 | 0 | 0 | 1 | 0 | 0 |
| 30 | Devin Richardson | LB | 6 | 5 | 11 | 1.5-2 | 0 | 0 | 0 | 0 | 0 | 0 | 0 | 0 |
| 8 | Terrance Brooks | DB | 5 | 4 | 9 | 0-0 | 0 | 3 | 0 | 0 | 0 | 0 | 0 | 0 |
| 2 | Roschon Johnson | RB | 5 | 3 | 8 | 0-0 | 0 | 0 | 0 | 0 | 0 | 0 | 0 | 0 |
| 45 | Vernon Broughton | DL | 5 | 2 | 7 | 1.0-1 | 0 | 0 | 4 | 0 | 0 | 0 | 0 | 0 |
| 32 | Prince Dorbah | EDGE | 3 | 4 | 7 | 1.0-1 | 0 | 0 | 0 | 0 | 0 | 0 | 0 | 0 |
| 1 | Justice Finkley | EDGE | 1 | 6 | 7 | 0.5-5 | 0 | 0 | 1 | 0 | 0 | 0 | 0 | 0 |
| 9 | Austin Jordan | DB | 4 | 3 | 7 | 0.5-2 | 0 | 0 | 0 | 0 | 0 | 0 | 0 | 0 |
| 91 | Ethan Burke | EDGE | 5 | 1 | 6 | 1.5-1 | 0 | 0 | 1 | 0 | 0 | 0 | 0 | 0 |
| 27 | JD Coffey III | DB | 3 | 3 | 6 | 0-0 | 0 | 0 | 0 | 0 | 0 | 0 | 0 | 0 |
| 31 | Jamier Johnson | DB | 4 | 1 | 5 | 0-0 | 0 | 1 | 0 | 0 | 0 | 0 | 0 | 0 |
| 7 | Keilan Robinson | RB | 4 | 0 | 4 | 0-0 | 0 | 0 | 0 | 0 | 0 | 1 | 0 | 0 |
| 5 | Bijan Robinson | RB | 3 | 0 | 3 | 0-0 | 0 | 0 | 0 | 0 | 0 | 0 | 0 | 0 |
| 97 | Kristopher Ross | DL | 0 | 2 | 2 | 0-0 | 0 | 0 | 0 | 0 | 0 | 0 | 0 | 0 |
| 15 | Will Stone | K | 2 | 0 | 2 | 0-0 | 0 | 0 | 0 | 0 | 0 | 0 | 0 | 0 |
| 94 | Jaray Bledsoe | DL | 0 | 1 | 1 | 0-0 | 0 | 0 | 0 | 0 | 0 | 0 | 0 | 0 |
| 14 | X'Avion Brice | DB | 1 | 0 | 1 | 0-0 | 0 | 0 | 0 | 0 | 0 | 0 | 0 | 1 |
| 47 | Luke Brockermeyer | LB | 1 | 0 | 1 | 0-0 | 0 | 0 | 0 | 0 | 0 | 0 | 0 | 0 |
| 24 | Jonathon Brooks | RB | 0 | 1 | 1 | 0-0 | 0 | 0 | 0 | 0 | 0 | 0 | 0 | 0 |
| 29 | Zach Edwards | DS | 0 | 1 | 1 | 0-0 | 0 | 0 | 0 | 0 | 0 | 0 | 0 | 0 |
| 42 | D.J. Harris Jr. | EDGE | 0 | 1 | 1 | 0-0 | 0 | 0 | 0 | 0 | 0 | 0 | 0 | 0 |
| 86 | Zac Swanson | DL | 1 | 0 | 1 | 0-0 | 0 | 0 | 0 | 0 | 0 | 0 | 0 | 0 |
| 17 | J'Mond Tapp | EDGE | 0 | 1 | 1 | 0-0 | 0 | 0 | 1 | 0 | 0 | 0 | 0 | 0 |
| 45 | Bert Auburn | K | 0 | 0 | 0 | 0-0 | 0 | 0 | 0 | 0 | 0 | 0 | 0 | 0 |
| 3 | Quinn Ewers | QB | 0 | 0 | 0 | 0-0 | 0 | 0 | 0 | 0 | 0 | 0 | 0 | 0 |
| 19 | Ishmael Ibraheem | DB | 0 | 0 | 0 | 0-0 | 0 | 1 | 0 | 0 | 0 | 0 | 0 | 0 |
| 0 | Ja'Tavion Sanders | TE | 0 | 0 | 0 | 0-0 | 0 | 0 | 0 | 0 | 0 | 0 | 0 | 0 |
| 4 | Jordan Whittington | WR | 0 | 0 | 0 | 0-0 | 0 | 0 | 0 | 0 | 0 | 0 | 0 | 0 |
| 1 | Xavier Worthy | WR | 0 | 0 | 0 | 0-0 | 0 | 0 | 0 | 0 | 0 | 0 | 0 | 0 |
| | TOTALS | | 518 | 472 | 990 | 87.0-312 | 10 | 52 | 46 | 3 | 9 | 4 | 0 | 4 |

Key: POS: Position, SOLO: Solo Tackles, AST: Assisted Tackles, TOT: Total Tackles, TFL: Tackles-for-loss, SACK: Quarterback Sacks, INT: Interceptions, BU: Passes Broken Up, PD: Passes Defended, QBH: Quarterback Hits, FR: Fumbles Recovered, FF: Forced Fumbles, BLK: Kicks or Punts Blocked, SAF: Safeties, TD : Touchdown

==== Special teams ====
Kicking statistics
| # | NAME | POS | XPM | XPA | XP% | FGM | FGA | FG% | 1–19 | 20–29 | 30–39 | 40–49 | 50+ | LNG |
|---|---|---|---|---|---|---|---|---|---|---|---|---|---|---|
| 45 | Bert Auburn | K | 55 | 55 | 100.00% | 21 | 26 | 80.77% | 0-0 | 8-9 | 6-8 | 7-9 | 0-0 | 49 |
| | TOTALS | | 55 | 55 | 100.00% | 21 | 26 | 80.77% | 0-0 | 8-9 | 6-8 | 7-9 | 0-0 | 49 |

Kickoff statistics
| # | NAME | POS | KICKS | YDS | AVG | TB | OB |
|---|---|---|---|---|---|---|---|
| 15 | Will Stone | K | 86 | 5369 | 62.4 | 26 | 3 |
| 45 | Bert Auburn | K | 1 | 65 | 65 | 1 | 0 |
| | TOTALS | | 87 | 5434 | 62.5 | 27 | 3 |

Punting statistics
| # | NAME | POS | PUNTS | YDS | AVG | LONG | TB | 1-20 | 50+ | BLK |
|---|---|---|---|---|---|---|---|---|---|---|
| 35 | Daniel Trejo | P | 46 | 1890 | 42.0 | 61 | 3 | 13 | 10 | 1 |
| 49 | Isaac Pearson | P | 1 | 15 | 15.00 | 15 | 0 | 0 | 0 | 0 |
| | TOTALS | | 47 | 1909 | 40.62 | 61 | 3 | 13 | 10 | 1 |

Kick return statistics
| # | NAME | POS | RTNS | YDS | AVG | TD | LNG |
|---|---|---|---|---|---|---|---|
| 7 | Keilan Robinson | RB | 16 | 403 | 25.19 | 0 | 52 |
| 2 | Roschon Johnson | RB | 2 | 39 | 19.50 | 0 | 24 |
| 4 | Jordan Whittington | WR | 1 | 18 | 18.00 | 0 | 18 |
| 85 | Gunnar Helm | TE | 1 | 12 | 12.00 | 0 | 12 |
| 37 | Morice Blackwell Jr. | DB | 1 | 0 | 00.00 | 0 | 0 |
| | TOTALS | | 21 | 472 | 22.48 | 0 | 52 |

Punt return statistics
| # | NAME | POS | RTNS | YDS | AVG | TD | LNG |
|---|---|---|---|---|---|---|---|
| 8 | Xavier Worthy | WR | 15 | 146 | 9.73 | 0 | 29 |
| 7 | Keilan Robinson | RB | 1 | 19 | 19.00 | 1 | 12 |
| 16 | Tarique Milton | WR | 1 | 15 | 15.00 | 0 | 15 |
| 5 | D'Shawn Jamison | DB | 2 | 10 | 5.00 | 0 | 10 |
| 11 | Anthony Cook | DB | 1 | -4 | -4.00 | 0 | 0 |
| | TOTALS | | 20 | 186 | 9.30 | 1 | 29 |

== Awards and honors ==
=== National awards and honors ===
Individual Yearly Awards
| Player | Position | Award | Ref. |
|---|---|---|---|
| Bijan Robinson | RB | Doak Walker Award | |

Weekly honors
| Honors | Player | Position | Date Awarded | Ref. |
|---|---|---|---|---|
| Big 12 Defensive Player of the Week | Jahdae Barron | DB | September 19, 2022 | |
| Big 12 Newcomer of the Week | Quinn Ewers | QB | October 10, 2022 | |
| 247Sports True Freshman of the Week | Kelvin Banks | OL | October 10, 2022 | |
| Big 12 Defensive Player of the Week | Jaylan Ford | LB | October 17, 2022 | |
| Big 12 Defensive Player of the Week | Jaylan Ford | LB | November 7, 2022 | |
| Bronko Nagurski National Defensive Player of the Week | Jaylan Ford | LB | November 8, 2022 | |
| Big 12 Offensive Player of the Week | Bijan Robinson | RB | November 21, 2022 | |
| Earl Campbell Tyler Rose Award Player of the Week | Bijan Robinson | RB | November 22, 2022 | |
| Big 12 Co-offensive Player of the Week | Bijan Robinson | RB | November 28, 2022 | |
| Big 12 Defensive Player of the Week | Jaylan Ford | LB | November 28, 2022 | |

=== Conference honors ===
All-Big 12 Team
| Player | Position | Class | Team | Ref. |
|---|---|---|---|---|
| Bijan Robinson | RB | Junior | 1st | |
| Ja'Tavion Sanders | TE | Sophomore | 1st | |
| Jaylan Ford | LB | Junior | 1st | |
| DeMarvion Overshown | LB | Senior | 1st | |
| Xavier Worthy | WR | Sophomore | 2nd | |
| Kelvin Banks Jr. | OL | Freshman | 2nd | |
| Keondre Coburn | DL | Senior | 2nd | |

=== All-Americans ===
NCAA Recognized All-American Honors
| Player | AP | AFCA | FWAA | TSN | WCFF | Designation |
|---|---|---|---|---|---|---|
| Bijan Robinson | 1st | 1st | 1st | 1st | 1st | Unanimous |
| Jaylan Ford | 3rd | — | — | — | — | — |
The NCAA recognizes a selection to all five of the AP, AFCA, FWAA, TSN and WCFF first teams for unanimous selections and three of five for consensus selections. HM = Honorable mention. Source:

Other All-American Honors
| Player | Athletic | Athlon | BR | CBS Sports | CFN | ESPN | FOX Sports | Phil Steele | SI | USA Today |
|---|---|---|---|---|---|---|---|---|---|---|
| Bijan Robinson | 1st | | 1st | 1st | 1st | 1st | 1st | 1st | | 1st |
| Jaylan Ford | 2nd | | — | — | — | — | — | 3rd | | — |
| Will Stone | — | — | — | — | 2nd | — | — | — | — | — |

=== All Star games ===
All Star Games
| Game Name | Player | Position | Class | Ref. |
|---|---|---|---|---|
| Senior Bowl | DeMarvion Overshown | LB | Senior | |
| Senior Bowl | Roschon Johnson | RB | Senior | |

== TV ratings ==
| Opponent | Outlet | Viewers | Rating |
|---|---|---|---|
| Louisiana–Monroe | LHN | † | † |
| Alabama | Fox | 10.60M | 5.7 |
| UTSA | LHN | † | † |
| @ Texas Tech | ESPN | 2.28M | 1.3 |
| West Virginia | FS1 | 1.19M | 0.58 |
| Oklahoma | ABC | 3.36M | 1.8 |
| Iowa State | ABC | 2.35M | 1.3 |
| @ Oklahoma State | ABC | 4.46M | 2.5 |
| @ Kansas State | FS1 | 1.25M | 0.58 |
| TCU | ABC | 5.03M | 1.25 |
| @ Kansas | FS1 | 940K | 0.48 |
| Baylor | ESPN | 2.69M | 1.4 |
| Washington | ESPN | 4.78M | 2.6 |

All totals via Sports Media Watch. Streaming numbers not included. † - Data not available.

== Rankings ==
Ranking movements Legend: ██ Increase in ranking ██ Decrease in ranking — = Not ranked RV = Received votes т = Tied with team above or below ( ) = First-place votes
| | Week | | | | | | | | | | | | | | | |
| Poll | Pre | 1 | 2 | 3 | 4 | 5 | 6 | 7 | 8 | 9 | 10 | 11 | 12 | 13 | 14 | Final |
|---|---|---|---|---|---|---|---|---|---|---|---|---|---|---|---|---|
| AP | RV | RV | 21 | 22 | — | — | 22T | 20 | RV | RV | 18 | RV | 24 | 21 | 21 | 25 |
| Coaches | 18 (1) | 22 | 20 | 19 | RV | RV | 24 | 21 | RV | RV | 18 | RV | 24 | 21 | 21 | 25 |
| CFP | Not released | | | | | | | | | 24 | 18 | — | 23 | 20 | 20 | Not released |
