= Jaylon Guilbeau =

American football player (born 2004)

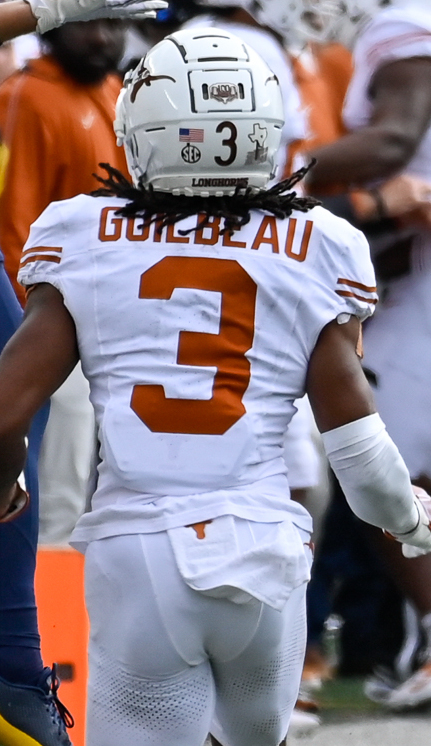
- Guilbeau in 2024

Profile
- Position: Cornerback

Personal information
- Born: March 29, 2004 (age 22)
- Listed height: 5 ft 11 in (1.80 m)
- Listed weight: 190 lb (86 kg)

Career information
- High school: Memorial (Port Arthur, Texas)
- College: Texas (2022–2025)
- NFL draft: 2026: undrafted

Career history
- Carolina Panthers (2026)*; Pittsburgh Steelers (2026)*
- * Offseason or practice squad member only
- Stats at Pro Football Reference

Jaylon Guilbeau (born March 29, 2004) is an American professional football cornerback. He played college football for the Texas Longhorns and was signed as an undrafted free agent by the Carolina Panthers following the 2026 NFL draft.

== Early life ==
Guilbeau attended Memorial High School in Port Arthur, Texas. He was selected to play in the 2022 All-American Bowl. Coming out of high school, he was a four-star recruit. Guilbeau originally committed to play college football at the University of Texas at Austin before flipping his commitment to Texas Christian University (TCU) and ultimately switching back to Texas.

== College career ==
Guilbeau played in eight games and made three starts as a true freshman in 2022, recording 19 tackles for the Longhorns. As a sophomore in 2023, he played eight games and started one game, totaling seven tackles. As a junior in 2024, he played in 16 games and had 58 tackles and a sack. Guilbeau returned to Texas for his senior season in 2025.

As a senior in 2025, Guilbeau started all 4 games. He recorded his first career interception in Week 2 against San Jose State. He ended the season with 40 tackles with one tackle for a loss and one interception. On December 17, 2025, Guilbeau declared for the NFL draft.

=== College statistics ===
| Year | Team | GP | Tackles | | | | | Interceptions | | | | Fumbles | | | |
| Year | Team | GP | Solo | Ast | Cmb | TfL | Sck | Int | Yds | TD | PD | FR | Yds | TD | FF |
|---|---|---|---|---|---|---|---|---|---|---|---|---|---|---|---|
| 2022 | Texas | 8 | 8 | 11 | 19 | 0.5 | 0 | 0 | 0 | 0 | 2 | 0 | 0 | 0 | 0 |
| 2023 | Texas | 7 | 4 | 3 | 7 | 1.0 | 0 | 0 | 0 | 0 | 2 | 0 | 0 | 0 | 0 |
| 2024 | Texas | 16 | 35 | 23 | 58 | 5.5 | 1.0 | 0 | 0 | 0 | 3 | 0 | 0 | 0 | 0 |
| 2025 | Texas | 12 | 22 | 18 | 40 | 1.0 | 0 | 1 | 0 | 0 | 3 | 0 | 0 | 0 | 0 |
| Career | | 43 | 69 | 55 | 124 | 8.0 | 1.0 | 1 | 0 | 0 | 10 | 0 | 0 | 0 | 0 |

== Professional career ==
Pre-draft measurables
| Height | Weight | Arm length | Hand span | Wingspan | 40-yard dash | 10-yard split | 20-yard split | 20-yard shuttle | Three-cone drill | Vertical jump | Broad jump | Bench press |
|---|---|---|---|---|---|---|---|---|---|---|---|---|
| 5 ft 11 1/8 in (1.81 m) | 190 lb (86 kg) | 30 1/8 in (0.77 m) | 9 1/4 in (0.23 m) | 6 ft 2 1/2 in (1.89 m) | 4.56 s | 1.62 s | 2.63 s | 4.23 s | 6.86 s | 34.5 in (0.88 m) | 10 ft 5 in (3.18 m) | 15 reps |
All values from NFL Combine

=== Carolina Panthers ===
Guilbeau was signed as an undrafted free agent by the Carolina Panthers after the conclusion of the 2026 NFL draft. On July 21, 2026, he was placed on the reserve/non-football injury list. The next day, Guilbeau was waived with a non-football injury designation.

=== Pittsburgh Steelers ===
On August 24, 2026, Guilbeau signed with the Pittsburgh Steelers. He was waived by the Steelers on August 28.

== Personal life ==
Guilbeau has one daughter named Ryleigh, born July 16, 2025.
