= Ethan Burke =

American football player (born 2003)

No. 97 – Baltimore Ravens
- Position: Outside linebacker
- Roster status: Active

Personal information
- Born: June 20, 2003 (age 23); Annapolis, Maryland, U.S.
- Listed height: 6 ft 6 in (1.98 m)
- Listed weight: 267 lb (121 kg)

Career information
- High school: Westlake (Austin)
- College: Texas (2022–2025)
- NFL draft: 2026: undrafted

Career history
- Baltimore Ravens (2026–present)

Career NFL statistics as of Week 7, 2026
- Tackles: 8
- Sacks: 1
- Stats at Pro Football Reference

Ethan Burke (born June 20, 2003) is an American professional football outside linebacker for the Baltimore Ravens of the National Football League (NFL). He played college football for the Texas Longhorns.

== Early life ==
Burke attended Westlake High School in Austin, Texas. At Westlake, Burke was a dual sport athlete playing football and lacrosse. Originally, Burke committed to play lacrosse at Maryland. However, on December 1, 2021, Burke decommitted from Maryland and committed to Michigan to play both football and lacrosse. Then on December 15, 2021, Burke decommitted from Michigan and committed to Texas to play football.

Burke, a three-star prospect, helped lead Westlake to two state championships.

== College career ==
As a true freshman at Texas in 2022, Burke played in 11 games, recording five solo tackles and one assist. He made his college debut against Louisiana-Monroe. During his sophomore year, Burke earned a starting position and recorded four tackles and one sack in a win against Alabama. Burke was an honorable mention on the 2023 Big 12 All-Conference Team.

In 2025, Burke returned to Texas for his senior season. In Week 9 against Mississippi State, Burke recorded one blocked field goal, one sack, seven tackles, and one forced fumble. The sack-fumble created by Burke sealed the victory for Texas in overtime. For his performance, Burke was named Co-SEC Defensive Lineman of the Week. In Week 14 against Texas A&M, Burke recorded nine tackles, a pass break-up, and a blocked field goal and was named Co-SEC Defensive Player of the Week. At the end of the season, Burke accepted an invitation for the East-West Shrine Bowl.

== Career statistics ==
=== NFL ===
Year	Team	Games		Tackles					Interceptions						Fumbles				
Year	Team	GP	GS	Cmb	Solo	Ast	Sck	TFL	Int	Yds	Avg	Lng	TD	PD	FF	Fmb	FR	Yds	TD
2026	BAL	9	0	11	6	5	1.0	1	0	0	0.0	0	0	0	0	0	0	0	0
Career		9	0	11	6	5	1.0	1	0	0	0.0	0	0	0	0	0	0	0	0

=== College ===
Year	Team	GP	Tackles					Interceptions					Fumbles			
Year	Team	GP	Solo	Ast	Cmb	TfL	Sck	Int	Yds	Avg	TD	PD	FR	Yds	TD	FF
2022	Texas	11	5	1	6	1.5	0.0	0	0	0.0	0	0	0	0	0	0
2023	Texas	13	21	20	41	9.0	5.5	0	0	0.0	0	0	1	0	0	1
2024	Texas	16	17	10	27	9.0	2.0	1	30	30.0	1	4	0	0	0	0
2025	Texas	12	17	23	40	7.0	3.0	0	0	0	0	1	0	0	0	1
Career		52	60	54	114	26.5	10.5	1	30	30.0	1	5	1	0	0	2

== Professional career ==
Pre-draft measurables
Height	Weight	Arm length	Hand span	Wingspan	40-yard dash	10-yard split	20-yard split	20-yard shuttle	Three-cone drill	Vertical jump	Broad jump	Bench press
6 ft 5 7/8 in (1.98 m)	267 lb (121 kg)	33 1/4 in (0.84 m)	10 in (0.25 m)	6 ft 10 1/2 in (2.10 m)	4.95 s	1.68 s	2.69 s	4.33 s	6.94 s	29.5 in (0.75 m)	9 ft 11 in (3.02 m)	15 reps
All values from Pro Day

Burke signed with the Baltimore Ravens as an undrafted free agent on April 25, 2026. He signed a three-year contract worth $3.12 million. Burke posted his first career sack in Week 4 against the Tennessee Titans.
