= Morice Blackwell Jr. =

American football player (born 2002)

Morice Blackwell
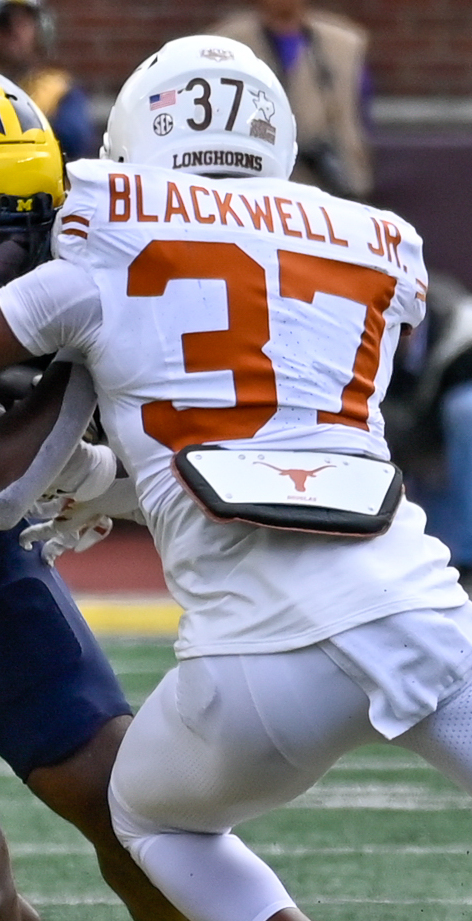
- Blackwell with the Texas Longhorns in 2024

Profile
- Position: Linebacker

Personal information
- Born: December 31, 2002 (age 23)
- Listed height: 6 ft 1 in (1.85 m)
- Listed weight: 214 lb (97 kg)

Career information
- High school: Martin (Arlington, Texas)
- College: Texas (2021–2024)
- NFL draft: 2025: undrafted

Career history
- Calgary Stampeders (2025–2026)
- Stats at CFL.ca

Morice Blackwell Jr. (born December 31, 2002) is an American professional football linebacker. He played college football for the Texas Longhorns.

== Early life and college ==
Morice Blackwell Jr. was born on December 31, 2002. He played high school football at Martin High School in Arlington, Texas. After his junior year, he committed to play college football at the University of Texas at Austin. Blackwell had been rated a four-star prospect by 247Sports in the class of 2021. He posted over 112 tackles each of his final two years, earning all-district honors.

Blackwell played for the Texas Longhorns from 2021 to 2024 as a rotational linebacker. He played 48 career games, recording 39 solo tackles, 26 assisted tackles, one fumble recovery, and two pass breakups.

== Professional career ==
Pre-draft measurables
Height	Weight
6 ft 0 5/8 in (1.84 m)	220 lb (100 kg)
Values from Pro Day

After going undrafted in the 2025 NFL draft, Blackwell was invited to rookie minicamp on a tryout basis with the Pittsburgh Steelers and Kansas City Chiefs. He was signed to the practice roster of the Calgary Stampeders of the Canadian Football League on June 18, 2025. He was promoted to the active roster on July 23, moved back to the practice roster on July 30, and promoted to the active roster again on August 8, 2025.

On July 14, 2026, Blackwell was released by the Stampeders.

== Career statistics ==
=== College ===
Year	Team	GP	Tackles					Interceptions					Fumbles			
Year	Team	GP	Solo	Ast	Cmb	TfL	Sck	Int	Yds	Avg	TD	PD	FR	Yds	TD	FF
2021	Texas	10	3	0	3	0.0	0.0	0	0	0.0	0	0	0	0	0	0
2022	Texas	12	7	4	11	1.0	0.0	0	0	0.0	0	1	0	0	0	0
2023	Texas	11	12	9	21	3.0	0.0	0	0	0.0	0	1	1	0	0	0
2024	Texas	15	17	13	30	0.0	0.0	0	0	0.0	0	0	0	0	0	0
Career		48	39	26	65	4.0	0.0	0	0	0.0	0	2	1	0	0	0
