= Agiye Hall =

American football player (born 2003)

Sacramento State Hornets
- Position: Wide receiver
- Class: Senior

Personal information
- Born: September 28, 2002 (age 24); Portsmouth, Virginia, U.S.
- Listed height: 6 ft 3 in (1.91 m)
- Listed weight: 196 lb (89 kg)

Career information
- High school: Bloomingdale (Valrico, Florida)
- College: Alabama (2021); Texas (2022); UCF (2024); Sacramento State (2025–present)
- Stats at ESPN

Agiye Hall (born September 28, 2002) is an American college football wide receiver for the Sacramento State Hornets. Hall attended and played high school football at Bloomingdale High School in Valrico, Florida and began his college career at Alabama in 2021.

== Early life ==
Hall attended Bloomingdale High School in his hometown of Valrico, Florida, where he played football and ran track. He was rated a five-star recruit by On3.com and a four-star recruit by 247Sports and Rivals.com. He committed to play college football at Alabama over offers from Georgia, LSU, Michigan, Miami and Oregon.

== College career ==
=== Alabama ===
As a true freshman, Hall appeared in seven games and recorded four receptions for 72 receiving yards. In the 2022 College Football Playoff National Championship game against Georgia, Hall played in relief of Jameson Williams following a knee injury and finished the game with two receptions for 52 yards in the 33–18 loss.

=== Texas ===
On August 12, 2022, Hall was suspended indefinitely by the Texas Longhorns following his arrest for criminal mischief. On December 20, Hall entered the transfer portal for a second time.

=== UCF ===
Hall initially committed to the University of Central Florida for the 2024 season after missing the 2023 campaign due to a suspension, but never reported to the program due to ineligibility.

=== Sacramento State ===
On January 5, 2025, Hall committed to Sacramento State. However, due to NCAA rules, he wasn't eligible to play in 2025 and had to sit out the season.

=== College statistics ===
Season	Team	GP	Receiving					Rushing					Fumbles	
Season	Team	GP	Rec	Yds	Avg	Lng	TD	Att	Yds	Avg	TD	Lng	FF	FR
2021	Alabama	7	4	72	18.0	28	0	0	0	0.0	0	0	0	0
2022	Texas	3	1	7	7.0	7	0	0	0	0.0	0	0	0	0
Career		10	5	79	15.8	28	0	0	0	0.0	0	0	0	0
