= D'Shawn Jamison =

American football player (born 1999)

Profile
- Position: Cornerback

Personal information
- Born: June 4, 1999 (age 27); New Orleans, Louisiana, U.S.
- Listed height: 5 ft 9 in (1.75 m)
- Listed weight: 186 lb (84 kg)

Career information
- High school: Lamar (Houston, Texas)
- College: Texas (2018–2022)
- NFL draft: 2023: undrafted

Career history
- San Francisco 49ers (2023)*; Carolina Panthers (2023); Pittsburgh Steelers (2024–2025)*; Arizona Cardinals (2026)*; New England Patriots (2026)*
- * Offseason or practice squad member only

Career NFL statistics as of 2025
- Total tackles: 10
- Pass deflections: 1
- Stats at Pro Football Reference

D'Shawn Jamison (born June 4, 1999) is an American professional football cornerback. He played college football for the Texas Longhorns. He previously played for the Carolina Panthers and Pittsburgh Steelers of the National Football League (NFL).

== Early life ==
Jamison was born and lived in New Orleans until his family was displaced by Hurricane Katrina in 2005 and settled in Houston, Texas. He attended Lamar High School, where he played football and ran track. Jamison was rated a four-star recruit and committed to play college football at Texas over offers from Michigan, Oregon, TCU and USC.

== College career ==
Jamison played wide receiver and returned punts and kicks during his freshman season. He was moved to cornerback prior to the start of his sophomore year and finished the season with 35 tackles, 3.5 tackles for loss, a forced fumble and a fumble recovery, three interceptions, and three passes broken up and also returned nine punts for 118 yards and one touchdown. Jamison had 31 tackles with six passes up as a junior and was named honorable mention All-Big 12 Conference as a returner after returning 17 kickoffs for 564 yards and one touchdown. and four punts 102 yards. He made 48 tackles with one interception while also returning 19 kickoffs for 424 yards and 12 punts for 105 yards during his senior season. Jamison decided to utilize the extra year of eligibility granted to college athletes who played in the 2020 season due to the coronavirus pandemic and return to Texas for a fifth season. He had 25 tackles with two interceptions, one of which he returned for a touchdown, and seven passes defended in his final season.

== Professional career ==
Pre-draft measurables
Height	Weight	Arm length	Hand span	Wingspan	40-yard dash	10-yard split	20-yard split	20-yard shuttle	Three-cone drill	Vertical jump	Broad jump	Bench press
5 ft 9 1/4 in (1.76 m)	184 lb (83 kg)	30 1/2 in (0.77 m)	8 1/2 in (0.22 m)	6 ft 3 1/8 in (1.91 m)	4.51 s	1.58 s	2.53 s	4.28 s	6.74 s	33.0 in (0.84 m)	10 ft 3 in (3.12 m)	13 reps
All values from Pro Day

=== San Francisco 49ers ===
Jamison was signed by the San Francisco 49ers as an undrafted free agent on April 29, 2023. He was waived by San Francisco on August 29.

=== Carolina Panthers ===
On August 30, 2023, Jamison was claimed off waivers by the Carolina Panthers. In a Week 4 game against the Minnesota Vikings, Jamison saw increased playing time due to injuries in the Panthers secondary. During a play in which teammate Sam Franklin Jr. recorded a 99 yard interception returned for a touchdown, Jamison raced down the sideline, surpassing 22 miles per hour, and delivered a key block on Vikings quarterback Kirk Cousins to clear a path to the end zone. Jamison recorded 10 tackles and a pass defended with the Panthers.

On August 28, 2024, Jamison was waived by the Panthers.

=== Pittsburgh Steelers ===
On September 17, 2024, Jamison signed with the Pittsburgh Steelers practice squad. He signed a reserve/future contract with Pittsburgh on January 14, 2025. On August 25, Jamison was waived by the Steelers. Two days later, he re-signed to the practice squad. He signed a reserve/future contract with Pittsburgh on January 17, 2026. On August 30, Jamison was waived by Pittsburgh as a part of final roster cuts.

=== Arizona Cardinals ===
On September 3, 2026, Jamison was signed to the Arizona Cardinals' practice squad. On October 6, he was released by the Cardinals.

=== New England Patriots ===
On October 13, 2026, Jamison signed to the New England Patriots practice squad. On October 19, he was released from the practice squad.
