= Regents School of Austin =

- The official seal of the Regents School of Austin

Location
- 3230 Travis Country Circle; Austin, Texas; United States; 30.254519°N 97.845369°W

Information
- Type: Private
- Motto: Coram Deo
- Established: 1992
- Headmaster: Dr. Dan Peterson
- Faculty: 99.4 (FTE)
- Grades: K through 12
- Enrollment: 1,000
- Student to teacher ratio: 10.06
- Colors: Blue and Gold
- Athletics conference: Texas Association of Private and Parochial Schools 5A
- Mascot: Knights
- Accreditation: TEPSAC - ACCS
- Website: Regents School

Regents School of Austin is a private, classical, non-denominational Christian school located in Austin, Texas.

== Curriculum ==
The Regents curriculum is loosely based on a classical education model called the Trivium. The Trivium is composed of three stages: grammar, logic, and rhetoric. Grammar school comprises kindergarten through 6th grade, logic is in grades 7 and 8, and rhetoric is in grades 9 to 12.

In the grammar stage (K - 6) students are taught the building blocks for future subjects, including phonics, Latin, grammar, and math facts. In the logic stage (grades 7 – 8), students learn formal logic. In the final stage, rhetoric (grades 9 - 12), students learn classical rhetoric.

The school names represent their developmental approach to education.

== History ==
Regents was founded in 1992. It was originally at Park Hills Baptist Church before moving to Tarrytown Baptist Church. Regents spent many years meeting in portable buildings in the parking lot at Tarrytown Baptist before moving to a permanent campus in 1998. Regents had its first graduating class in 2000, consisting of two students.

The school has grown to more than 1,000 students.

== Athletics ==
Regents offers the following athletic programs at the high-school level:

- Football
- Baseball
- Basketball
- Cross Country
- Golf
- Soccer
- Tennis
- Track
- Lacrosse
- Dance
- Cheer

The school is part of TAPPS Division III. The 6-man football team has won five state championships within a ten-year period, the first TAPPS team to do so: in 2001, 2002, 2003 in divisions 1A and 2A, in 2006 in 4A, and again in 2010. The Knights again made the state championship game in 2011, losing to Bullard Brook Hill 26-3. In 2012 Regents moved up to TAPPS Division II and in 2016 again made the state championship game, losing to Grapevine Faith Christian 29-30 in double-overtime. In 2020, after losing at the state title game every year since 2016, Regents won the TAPPS 5A football state championship, their first ever 11-man state title. In 2025, Regents lost in the playoff semifinal game.

== Notable people ==
- Terrence Rencher, basketball coach: former head coach
- Joey Wright, basketball player and coach: former basketball coach
