= Terrance Brooks (cornerback) =

American football player

No. 8
- Position: Cornerback
- Class: Junior

Personal information
- Listed height: 6 ft 0 in (1.83 m)
- Listed weight: 205 lb (93 kg)

Career information
- High school: Little Elm (Little Elm, Texas)
- College: Texas (2022–2023); Illinois (2024)
- Stats at ESPN

Terrance Brooks is an American college football cornerback who played for the Texas Longhorns and Illinois Fighting Illini.

== Early life ==
Brooks attended Little Elm High School in Little Elm, Texas. He was rated as a four-star recruit, the 8th best cornerback, and the 59th overall prospect in the class of 2022. Brooks also held offers from school such as Alabama, Arkansas, Auburn, California, Clemson, Colorado, Florida, Georgia Tech, Houston, LSU, Michigan, Minnesota, Missouri, Nebraska, Notre Dame, Ohio State, Oklahoma, Ole Miss, Oregon, Penn State, SMU, TCU, Texas, Texas A&M, Texas Tech, UNLV, Utah, Washington, and Wisconsin. Brooks initially committed to play college football for the Ohio State Buckeyes. However, Brooks flipped his commitment to play for the Texas Longhorns.

== College career ==
=== Texas ===
As a freshman in 2022, Brooks played nine games, making three starts, where he tallied nine tackles and three pass deflections. In 2023, he played all 14 games for Texas, making 13 starts where tallied 20 tackles, six pass deflections, and three interceptions, earning honorable mention all-Big 12 Conference honors. After the season, Brooks entered his name into the NCAA transfer portal.

=== Illinois ===
On May 12, 2024, Brooks announced that he would transfer to Illinois.

In 2024, he played in seven games, where he tallied five tackles and a pass deflection.

On March 11, 2025, it was announced that Brooks was no longer on the team.
