= 2023 Big 12 Conference football season =

American college football season

- League: NCAA Division I FBS football season
- Sport: football
- Duration: August 31, 2023; January 2024
- Teams: 14
- TV partner(s): Fox Family (Fox, FS1), ESPN Family (ABC, ESPN, ESPN2, ESPN+, ESPNU, Big 12 Now, LHN)

2024 NFL draft
- Top draft pick: Byron Murphy II, DT, Texas
- Picked by: Seattle Seahawks, 16th overall

Championship Game
- Champions: Texas
- Runners-up: Oklahoma State
- Finals MVP: Quinn Ewers, QB, Texas

Seasons
- 2022 2024

2023 Big 12 Conference football standings
	Conf.			Overall
Team	W		L	W		L
No. 3 Texas y$^	8	–	1	12	–	2
No. 16 Oklahoma State y	7	–	2	10	–	4
No. 15 Oklahoma	7	–	2	10	–	3
Iowa State	6	–	3	7	–	6
No. 18 Kansas State	6	–	3	9	–	4
West Virginia	6	–	3	9	–	4
Texas Tech	5	–	4	7	–	6
No. 23 Kansas	5	–	4	9	–	4
UCF	3	–	6	6	–	7
TCU	3	–	6	5	–	7
Houston	2	–	7	4	–	8
BYU	2	–	7	5	–	7
Baylor	2	–	7	3	–	9
Cincinnati	1	–	8	3	–	9
Championship: Texas 49, Oklahoma State 21
^ – College Football Playoff participant; $ – Conference champion; y – Championship game participant; Rankings from AP Poll

The 2023 Big 12 Conference football season was the 28th season of the Big 12 Conference football, part of the 2023 NCAA Division I FBS football season.

The 2023 season was the first season for the Big 12 to have 14 members, with BYU, Cincinnati, Houston, and UCF joining the conference. It was also the last season for founding conference members Oklahoma and Texas, who left for the Southeastern Conference prior to the start of the 2024 season.

The 2023 Big 12 Championship Game was played at AT&T Stadium in Arlington, Texas, on December 2, 2023, between Texas and Oklahoma State. Texas won 49–21, winning their fourth Big 12 championship in team history.

== Preseason ==
=== Recruiting classes ===
National Rankings
Team	ESPN	Rivals	24/7	On3 Recruits	Total Signees
Baylor	29	31	34	32	21
BYU	29	65	66	68	20
Cincinnati	29	80	74	53	12
Houston	29	52	56	54	20
Iowa State	-	41	41	44	23
Kansas	-	73	73	70	14
Kansas State	-	34	32	37	27
Oklahoma	15	6	4	7	27
Oklahoma State	36	22	29	58	20
TCU	-	21	20	20	23
Texas	13	3	3	3	25
Texas Tech	-	23	28	27	25
UCF	29	50	50	39	15
West Virginia	-	44	48	51	19

=== Big 12 media days ===
The 2023 Big 12 media days were held in July 2023 in Frisco, Texas. The teams and representatives in respective order were as follows:

- Big 12 Commissioner – Brett Yormark
- Baylor – Dave Aranda (HC), Blake Shapen (QB), Drake Dabney (TE), Josh Cameron (WR), T.J. Franklin (DL), Mike Smith Jr. (LB)
- BYU – Kalani Sitake (HC), Kedon Slovis (QB), Kody Epps (WR), Ben Bywater (LB), Tyler Batty (DE), Ryan Rehkow (P)
- Cincinnati – Scott Satterfield (HC), Emory Jones (QB), Deshawn Pace (DE), Jowon Briggs (DL), Dontay Corleone (DL)
- Houston – Dana Holgorsen (HC), Nelson Ceaser (DL), Jack Freeman (OL), Hasaan Hypolite (LB), Patrick Paul (OL)
- Iowa State – Matt Campbell (HC), Jaylin Noel (WR), Beau Freyler (DB), T. J. Tampa (DB), Gerry Vaughn (LB)
- Kansas – Lance Leipold (HC), Jalon Daniels (QB), Devin Neal (RB), Rich Miller (LB), Kenny Logan Jr. (S)
- Kansas State – Chris Klieman (HC), Will Howard (QB), Cooper Beebe (OL), Daniel Green (LB), Kobe Savage (S)
- Oklahoma – Brent Venables (HC) Dillon Gabriel (QB), Drake Stoops (WR), Jonah Laulu (DL), Danny Stutsman (LB)
- Oklahoma State – Mike Gundy (HC), Collin Oliver (LB), Korie Black (CB), Brennan Presley (WR), Preston Wilson (OL)
- TCU – Sonny Dykes (HC), Bud Clark (S), Brandon Coleman (OL), Jamoi Hodge (LB), Josh Newton (CB), Jared Wiley (TE)
- Texas – Steve Sarkisian (HC), Quinn Ewers (QB), Jordan Whittington (WR), Xavier Worthy (WR), Jaylan Ford (LB), Jahdae Barron (DB)
- Texas Tech – Joey McGuire (HC), Tyler Shough (QB), Jerand Bradley (WR), Tahj Brooks (RB), Tony Bradford Jr. (DL), Jaylon Hutchings (DL)
- UCF – Gus Malzahn (HC), Javon Baker (WR), Ricky Barber (DT), John Rhys Plumlee (QB), Josh Celiscar (DE), Lokahi Pauole (OL)
- West Virginia – Neal Brown (HC), Zach Frazier (OL), Doug Nester (OL), Sean Martin (DL), Lee Kpogba (LB), Aubrey Burks (DB)

=== Preseason poll ===
The preseason poll was released on July 6, 2023.

Big 12
Predicted finish	Team	Votes (1st place)
1	Texas	886 (41)
2	Kansas State	858 (14)
3	Oklahoma	758 (4)
4	Texas Tech	729 (4)
5	TCU	727 (3)
6	Baylor	572
7	Oklahoma State	470 (1)
8	UCF	463
9	Kansas	461
10	Iowa State	334
11	BYU	318
12	Houston	215
13	Cincinnati	202
14	West Virginia	129

- First place votes in ()

=== Preseason awards ===
==== All−American Teams ====
	AP 1st Team	AP 2nd Team	AS 1st Team	AS 2nd Team	AS 3rd Team	AS 4thTeam	WCFF 1st Team	WCFF 2nd Team	ESPN	CBS 1st Team	CBS 2nd Team	CFN 1st Team	CFN 2nd Team	PFF 1st Team	PFF 2nd Team	PFF 3rd Team	SN 1st Team	SN 2nd Team
Kelvin Banks Jr.		✓		✓							✓							
Cooper Beebe	✓		✓				✓		✓	✓				✓			✓	
Phillip Brooks						✓												
Jalen Catalon						✓												
Dontay Corleone	✓			✓			✓							✓				✓
Mason Fletcher					✓													✓
Jaylan Ford					✓													✓
Zach Frazier		✓	✓					✓			✓						✓	
Jaylon Hutchings						✓												
Byron Murphy						✓												
Josh Newton		✓				✓									✓			
Ja'Tavion Sanders					✓						✓		✓			✓		
Kingsley Suamataia													✓					
Xavier Worthy		✓		✓				✓			✓	✓			✓			

==== Individual awards ====
Award	Head Coach/Player	School	Position	Year	Ref
Lott Trophy	Ben Bywater	BYU	LB	Jr.	
Lott Trophy	Danny Stutsman	Oklahoma	LB	Jr.	
Lott Trophy	Collin Oliver	Oklahoma State	DL	Jr.	
Lott Trophy	Cobee Bryant	Kansas	DB	Jr.	
Lott Trophy	Jaylan Ford	Texas	LB	Sr.	
Lott Trophy	Johnny Hodges	TCU	LB	Sr.	
Lott Trophy	Joshua Newton	TCU	DB	Sr.	
Dodd Trophy	Dave Aranda	Baylor	—	—	
Dodd Trophy	Gus Malzahn	UCF	—	—	
Dodd Trophy	Joey McGuire	Texas Tech	—	—	
Dodd Trophy	Steve Sarkisian	Texas	—	—	
Dodd Trophy	Brent Venables	Oklahoma	—	—	
Maxwell Award	Richard Reese	Baylor	RB	So.	
Maxwell Award	Kedon Slovis	BYU	QB	Sr.	
Maxwell Award	Aidan Robbins	BYU	RB	Jr.	
Maxwell Award	Matthew Golden	Houston	WR	So.	
Maxwell Award	Devin Neal	Kansas	RB	Jr.	
Maxwell Award	Jalon Daniels	Kansas	QB	Jr.	
Maxwell Award	Will Howard	Kansas State	QB	Sr.	
Maxwell Award	Dillon Gabriel	Oklahoma	QB	Sr.	
Maxwell Award	Chandler Morris	TCU	QB	So.	
Maxwell Award	Quinn Ewers	Texas	QB	So.	
Maxwell Award	Xavier Worthy	Texas	WR	Jr.	
Maxwell Award	Tyler Shough	Texas Tech	QB	Sr.	
Maxwell Award	John Rhys Plumlee	UCF	QB	Sr.	
Davey O'Brien Award	Jalon Daniels	Kansas	QB	Jr.	
Davey O'Brien Award	Will Howard	Kansas State	QB	Sr.	
Davey O'Brien Award	Dillon Gabriel	Oklahoma	QB	Sr.	
Davey O'Brien Award	Quinn Ewers	Texas	QB	So.	
Davey O'Brien Award	John Rhys Plumlee	UCF	QB	Sr.	
Doak Walker Award	Richard Reese	Baylor	RB	So.	
Doak Walker Award	Aidan Robbins	BYU	RB	Jr.	
Doak Walker Award	Tony Mathis Jr.	Houston	RB	Jr.	
Doak Walker Award	Daniel Hishaw Jr.	Kansas	RB	So.	
Doak Walker Award	Devin Neal	Kansas	RB	Jr.	
Doak Walker Award	Treshaun Ward	Kansas State	RB	Sr.	
Doak Walker Award	Jovantae Barnes	Oklahoma	RB	So.	
Doak Walker Award	Emani Bailey	TCU	RB	Jr.	
Doak Walker Award	Trey Sanders	TCU	RB	Jr.	
Doak Walker Award	Tahj Brooks	Texas Tech	RB	Sr.	
Biletnikoff Award	Brennan Presley	Oklahoma State	WR	Sr.	
Biletnikoff Award	Xavier Worthy	Texas	WR	Jr.	
Biletnikoff Award	Jerand Bradley	Texas Tech	WR	So.	
John Mackey Award	Isaiah Rex	BYU	TE	Jr.	
John Mackey Award	Mason Fairchild	Kansas	TE	Sr.	
John Mackey Award	Ben Sinnott	Kansas State	TE	Jr.	
John Mackey Award	Austin Stogner	Oklahoma	TE	Sr.	
Rimington Trophy	Clark Barrington	Baylor	OL	GS	
Rimington Trophy	Connor Pay	BYU	OL	Jr.	
Rimington Trophy	Jack Freeman	Houston	OL	Sr.	
Rimington Trophy	Mike Novitsky	Kansas	OL	rsSr.	
Rimington Trophy	John Lanz	TCU	OL	Sr.	
Rimington Trophy	Jake Majors	Texas	OL	Jr.	
Rimington Trophy	Rusty Staats	Texas Tech	OL	Sr.	
Rimington Trophy	Zach Frazier	West Virginia	OL	Jr.	
Butkus Award	Ben Bywater	BYU	LB	Jr.	
Butkus Award	Danny Stutsman	Oklahoma	LB	Jr.	
Butkus Award	Jaylan Ford	Texas	LB	Sr.	
Butkus Award	Jason Johnson	UCF	LB	GS.	
Jim Thorpe Award	Cobee Bryant	Kansas	DB	Jr.	
Jim Thorpe Award	Kobe Savage	Kansas State	DB	Sr.	
Jim Thorpe Award	Joshua Newton	TCU	DB	Sr.	
Bronko Nagurski Trophy	Gabe Hall	Baylor	DL	Sr.	
Bronko Nagurski Trophy	Dontay Corleone	Cincinnati	DL	rsSo.	
Bronko Nagurski Trophy	T. J. Tampa	Iowa State	DB	Sr.	
Bronko Nagurski Trophy	Cobee Bryant	Kansas	DB	Jr.	
Bronko Nagurski Trophy	Kobe Savage	Kansas State	DB	Sr.	
Bronko Nagurski Trophy	Danny Stutsman	Oklahoma	LB	Jr.	
Bronko Nagurski Trophy	Collin Oliver	Oklahoma State	DL	Jr.	
Bronko Nagurski Trophy	Joshua Newton	TCU	DB	Sr.	
Bronko Nagurski Trophy	Jaylan Ford	Texas	LB	Sr.	
Bronko Nagurski Trophy	Jaylon Hutchings	Texas Tech	DL	GS	
Bronko Nagurski Trophy	Jason Johnson	UCF	LB	GS	
Outland Trophy	Kelvin Banks Jr.	Texas	OL	So.	
Outland Trophy	Cooper Beebe	Kansas State	OL	Sr.	
Outland Trophy	Dontay Corleone	Cincinnati	DL	(redshirt) So.	
Outland Trophy	Zach Frazier	West Virginia	OL	Jr.	
Outland Trophy	Jarrod Hufford	Iowa State	OL	(redshirt) Sr.	
Outland Trophy	Jaylon Hutchings	Texas Tech	DL	Sr.	
Outland Trophy	KT Leveston	Kansas State	OL	Sr.	
Outland Trophy	Patrick Paul	Houston	OL	Jr.	
Outland Trophy	Lokahi Pauole	UCF	OL	Sr.	
Outland Trophy	Kingsley Suamataia	BYU	OL	So.	

Award	Head Coach/Player	School	Position	Year	Ref
Lou Groza Award	Bert Auburn	Texas	PK	Jr.	
Lou Groza Award	Colton Boomer	UCF	PK	So.	
Lou Groza Award	Griffin Kell	BYU	PK	Sr.	
Lou Groza Award	Seth Keller	Kansas	PK	Sr.	
Ray Guy Award	Austin McNamara	Texas Tech	P	Sr.	
Ray Guy Award	Jordy Sandy	TCU	P	Sr.	
Ray Guy Award	Laine Wilkins	Houston	P	Jr.	
Ray Guy Award	Luke Elzinga	Oklahoma	P	Sr.	
Ray Guy Award	Mason Fletcher	Cincinnati	P	Jr.	
Ray Guy Award	Oliver Straw	West Virginia	P	So.	
Ray Guy Award	Ryan Sanborn	Texas	P	GS	
Ray Guy Award	Tyler Perkins	Iowa State	P	So.	
Paul Hornung Award	Phillip Brooks	Kansas State	WR	Sr.	
Paul Hornung Award	Malik Fleming	Houston	WR	Sr.	
Paul Hornung Award	Kenny Logan Jr.	Kansas	WR	Sr.	
Paul Hornung Award	Jaylin Noel	Iowa State	WR	Jr.	
Paul Hornung Award	Ja'Shaun Poke	West Virginia	WR	Sr.	
Paul Hornung Award	Brennan Presley	Oklahoma State	WR	Sr.	
Paul Hornung Award	Xavier Worthy	Texas	WR	Jr.	
Wuerffel Trophy	Alfonzo Allen	Baylor	DB	So.	
Wuerffel Trophy	Brennan Presley	Oklahoma State	WR	Sr.	
Wuerffel Trophy	Christian Jones	Texas	OL	Sr.	
Wuerffel Trophy	Ethan Downs	Oklahoma	DL	Jr.	
Wuerffel Trophy	Gerry Vaughn	Iowa State	LB	Sr.	
Wuerffel Trophy	Jack Freeman	Houston	OL	Sr.	
Wuerffel Trophy	Jalon Daniels	Kansas	QB	Sr.	
Wuerffel Trophy	Josh Newton	TCU	DB	Sr.	
Wuerffel Trophy	Jowon Briggs	Cincinnati	DB	Sr.	
Wuerffel Trophy	Tony Bradford Jr.	Texas Tech	DL	Sr.	
Wuerffel Trophy	Tyler Batty	BYU	DL	Jr.	
Wuerffel Trophy	Will Howard	Kansas State	QB	Sr.	
Wuerffel Trophy	Zach Frazier	West Virginia	OL	Jr.	
Walter Camp Award	Jalon Daniels	Kansas	QB	Jr.	
Walter Camp Award	Dillon Gabriel	Oklahoma	QB	Sr.	
Walter Camp Award	Quinn Ewers	Texas	QB	So.	
Walter Camp Award	Xavier Worthy	Texas	WR	Jr.	
Bednarik Award	Ben Bywater	BYU	LB	Jr.	
Bednarik Award	T. J. Tampa	Iowa State	DB	Sr.	
Bednarik Award	Cobee Bryant	Kansas	DB	Jr.	
Bednarik Award	Kobe Savage	Kansas State	DB	Sr.	
Bednarik Award	Ethan Downs	Oklahoma	DL	Jr.	
Bednarik Award	Collin Oliver	Oklahoma State	DL	Jr.	
Bednarik Award	Joshua Newton	TCU	DB	Sr.	
Bednarik Award	Jaylan Ford	Texas	LB	Sr.	
Bednarik Award	Jaylon Hutchings	Texas Tech	DL	GS	
Bednarik Award	Jason Johnson	UCF	LB	GS	
Bednarik Award	Aubrey Burks	West Virginia	DB	Jr.	
Rotary Lombardi Award	Kingsley Suamataia	BYU	OL	So.	
Rotary Lombardi Award	Dontay Corleone	Cincinnati	DL	rsSo.	
Rotary Lombardi Award	Mike Novitsky	Kansas	OL	rsSr.	
Rotary Lombardi Award	Cooper Beebe	Kansas State	OL	Sr.	
Rotary Lombardi Award	Ethan Downs	Oklahoma	DL	Jr.	
Rotary Lombardi Award	Damonic Williams	TCU	DL	So.	
Rotary Lombardi Award	Brandon Coleman	TCU	OL	Sr.	
Rotary Lombardi Award	Kelvin Banks Jr.	Texas	OL	So.	
Rotary Lombardi Award	Jaylan Ford	Texas	LB	Sr.	
Rotary Lombardi Award	Ja'Tavion Sanders	Texas	TE	Jr.	
Rotary Lombardi Award	Jaylon Hutchings	Texas Tech	DL	GS.	
Rotary Lombardi Award	Zach Frazier	West Virginia	OL	Jr.	
Patrick Mannelly Award	Austin Riggs	BYU	LS	Jr.	
Patrick Mannelly Award	Gavin Gately	Houston	LS	Sr.	
Patrick Mannelly Award	Randen Plattner	Kansas State	LS	Sr.	
Patrick Mannelly Award	Brent Matiscik	TCU	TE	Jr.	
Patrick Mannelly Award	Austin Brinkman	West Virginia	LS	Jr.	
Earl Campbell Tyler Rose Award	Richard Reese	Baylor	RB	So.	
Earl Campbell Tyler Rose Award	Keanu Hill	BYU	WR	Jr.	
Earl Campbell Tyler Rose Award	Donovan Ollie	Cincinnati	WR	Sr.	
Earl Campbell Tyler Rose Award	Matthew Golden	Houston	WR	So.	
Earl Campbell Tyler Rose Award	Lawrence Arnold	Kansas	WR	Jr.	
Earl Campbell Tyler Rose Award	Alan Bowman	Oklahoma State	QB	Sr.	
Earl Campbell Tyler Rose Award	Brandon Coleman	TCU	OL	Sr.	
Earl Campbell Tyler Rose Award	Chandler Morris	TCU	QB	So.	
Earl Campbell Tyler Rose Award	Savion Williams	TCU	WR	Jr.	
Earl Campbell Tyler Rose Award	Quinn Ewers	Texas	QB	So.	
Earl Campbell Tyler Rose Award	Xavier Worthy	Texas	WR	Jr.	
Earl Campbell Tyler Rose Award	Jerand Bradley	Texas Tech	WR	Sr.	
Earl Campbell Tyler Rose Award	Tahj Brooks	Texas Tech	RB	Sr.	
Earl Campbell Tyler Rose Award	Tyler Shough	Texas Tech	QB	GS.	
Earl Campbell Tyler Rose Award	Noah Massey	West Virginia	WR	Sr.	
Polynesian College Football Player Of The Year Award	George Maile	Baylor	OL	RSFr.	
Polynesian College Football Player Of The Year Award	Atunaisa Mahe	BYU	DL	Sr.	
Polynesian College Football Player Of The Year Award	Chaz Ah You	BYU	LB	Sr.	
Polynesian College Football Player Of The Year Award	Isaac Rex	BYU	TE	Jr.	
Polynesian College Football Player Of The Year Award	Kingsley Suamataia	BYU	OL	So.	
Polynesian College Football Player Of The Year Award	Paul Maile	BYU	OL	Sr.	
Polynesian College Football Player Of The Year Award	Uso Seumalo	Kansas State	DL	Sr.	
Polynesian College Football Player Of The Year Award	Jonah La'ulu	Oklahoma	DL	Sr.	
Polynesian College Football Player Of The Year Award	Lokahi Pauole	UCF	OL	GS.	
Manning Award	Jalon Daniels	Kansas	QB	Jr.	
Manning Award	Dillon Gabriel	Oklahoma	QB	Sr.	
Manning Award	Quinn Ewers	Texas	QB	So.	
Manning Award	John Rhys Plumlee	UCF	QB	Sr.	
Johnny Unitas Golden Arm Award	Blake Shapen	Baylor	QB	RS Jr.	
Johnny Unitas Golden Arm Award	Kedon Slovis	BYU	QB	Sr.	
Johnny Unitas Golden Arm Award	Donovan Smith	Houston	QB	Jr.	
Johnny Unitas Golden Arm Award	Jalon Daniels	Kansas	QB	Jr.	
Johnny Unitas Golden Arm Award	Will Howard	Kansas State	QB	Sr.	
Johnny Unitas Golden Arm Award	Dillon Gabriel	Oklahoma	QB	Sr.	
Johnny Unitas Golden Arm Award	Quinn Ewers	Texas	QB	So.	

==== Preseason All-Big 12 teams ====
2023 Preseason All-Big 12

- Offensive Player of the Year: Jalon Daniels, QB, Kansas, Jr.
- Defensive Player of the Year: Jaylan Ford, LB, Texas, Sr.
- Newcomer of the Year: Treshaun Ward, RB, Kansas State, Sr.

All-Big 12 Offense
Position	Player	Class	Team
QB	Jalon Daniels	Jr.	Kansas
RB	Richard Reese	So.	Baylor
RB	Devin Neal	Jr.	Kansas
FB	Ben Sinnott	Jr.	Kansas State
WR	Brennan Presley	Sr.	Oklahoma State
WR	Xavier Worthy	Jr.	Texas
WR	Jerand Bradley	So.	Texas Tech
TE	Ja’Tavion Sanders	Jr.	Texas
OL	Kingsley Suamataia	So.	BYU
OL	Mike Novitsky	R-Sr.	Kansas
OL	Cooper Beebe	Sr.	Kansas State
OL	Kelvin Banks Jr.	So.	Texas
OL	Zach Frazier	Jr.	West Virginia
PK	Griffin Kell	Sr.	TCU
KR/PR	Phillip Brooks	Sr.	Kansas State

All-Big 12 Defense
Position	Player	Class	Team
DL	Dontay Corleone	R-So.	Cincinnati
DL	Ethan Downs	Jr.	Oklahoma
DL	Damonic Williams	So.	TCU
DL	Byron Murphy II	Jr.	Texas
DL	Jaylon Hutchings	Sr.	Texas Tech
LB	Collin Oliver	Jr.	Oklahoma State
LB	Johnny Hodges	Jr.	TCU
LB	Jaylan Ford	Sr.	Texas
DB	T. J. Tampa	Sr.	Iowa State
DB	Cobee Bryant	Jr.	Kansas
DB	Kobe Savage	Sr.	Kansas State
DB	Kendal Daniels	R-So.	Oklahoma State
DB	Josh Newton	Sr.	TCU
P	Mason Fletcher	Jr.	Cincinnati

== Head coaches ==
Team	Head coach	Year at school	Overall record	Record at school	Big 12 record
Baylor	Dave Aranda	4	20–16	20–16	13–14
BYU	Kalani Sitake	8	56–34	56–34	0–0
Cincinnati	Scott Satterfield	1	76–48	0–0	0–0
Houston	Dana Holgorsen	5	88–61	27–20	0–0
Iowa State	Matt Campbell	8	81–57	46–42	32–31
Kansas	Lance Leipold	3	154–56	8–17	4–14
Kansas State	Chris Klieman	5	102–33	30–20	20–16
Oklahoma	Brent Venables	2	6–7	6–7	3–6
Oklahoma State	Mike Gundy	19	156–75	156–75	95–61
TCU	Sonny Dykes	2	84–65	13–2	9–0
Texas	Steve Sarkisian	3	59–47	13–12	9–9
Texas Tech	Joey McGuire	2	8–5	8–5	5–4
UCF	Gus Malzahn	3	94–47	18–9	0–0
West Virginia	Neal Brown	5	57–41	22–25	14–21

== Schedule ==
Index to colors and formatting
Big 12 member won
Big 12 member lost
Big 12 teams in **bold**

All times Central time.

† denotes Homecoming game

Rankings reflect those of the AP poll for weeks 1 through 9. Rankings from Week 10 until the end of the Season reflect those of the College Football Playoff Rankings.

=== Regular season ===
==== Week One ====
Date	Time	Visiting team	Home team	Site	TV	Result	Attendance	Ref.
August 31	6:00 p.m.	Kent State	**UCF**	FBC Mortgage Stadium • Orlando, FL	FS1	**W** 56–6	44,088	
September 1	7:00 p.m.	Missouri State	**Kansas**	David Booth Kansas Memorial Stadium • Lawrence, KS	ESPN+	**W** 48–17	41,091	
September 2	11:00 a.m.	Colorado	No. 17 **TCU**	Amon G. Carter Stadium • Fort Worth, TX	FOX	**L** 42–45	53,294	
September 2	11:00 a.m.	Arkansas State	No. 20 **Oklahoma**	Gaylord Family Oklahoma Memorial Stadium • Norman, OK	ESPN	**W** 73–0	83,221	
September 2	1:00 p.m.	No. 23 (FCS) Northern Iowa	**Iowa State**	Jack Trice Stadium • Ames, IA	ESPN+	**W** 30–9	58,248	
September 2	2:30 p.m.	No. 24 (FCS) Eastern Kentucky	**Cincinnati**	Nippert Stadium • Cincinnati, OH	ESPN+	**W** 66–13	38,193	
September 2	2:30 p.m.	Rice	No. 11 **Texas**	Darrell K Royal–Texas Memorial Stadium • Austin, TX (rivalry)	FOX	**W** 37–10	98,017	
September 2	6:00 p.m.	No. 12 (FCS) Southeast Missouri State	No. 16 **Kansas State**	Bill Snyder Family Football Stadium • Manhattan, KS	ESPN+	**W** 45–0	52,066	
September 2	6:00 p.m.	Central Arkansas	**Oklahoma State**	Boone Pickens Stadium • Stillwater, OK	ESPN+	**W** 27–13	53,855	
September 2	6:00 p.m.	UTSA	**Houston**	TDECU Stadium • Houston, TX	FS1	**W** 17–14	37,862	
September 2	6:00 p.m.	Texas State	**Baylor**	McLane Stadium • Waco, TX	ESPN+	**L** 31–42	44,945	
September 2	6:30 p.m.	**Texas Tech**	Wyoming	War Memorial Stadium • Laramie, WY	CBS	**L** 33–35 ^{2OT}	26,450	
September 2	6:30 p.m.	**West Virginia**	No. 7 Penn State	Beaver Stadium • University Park, PA (rivalry)	NBC	**L** 15–38	110,747	
September 2	9:15 p.m.	Sam Houston	**BYU**	LaVell Edwards Stadium • Provo, UT	FS1	**W** 14–0	59,006	
^{#}Rankings from AP Poll released prior to game. All times are in Central Time.

==== Week Two ====
Date	Time	Visiting team	Home team	Site	TV	Result	Attendance	Ref.
September 8	6:30 p.m.	Illinois	**Kansas**	David Booth Kansas Memorial Stadium • Lawrence, KS	ESPN2	**W** 34–23	45,809	
September 9	11:00 a.m.	No.12 Utah	**Baylor**	McLane Stadium • Waco, TX	ESPN	**L** 13–20	43,732	
September 9	11:00 a.m.	Troy	No. 15 **Kansas State**	Bill Snyder Family Football Stadium • Manhattan, KS	FS1	**W** 42–13	51,940	
September 9	2:00 p.m.	Southern Utah	**BYU**	LaVell Edwards Stadium • Provo, UT	ESPN+	**W** 41–16	60,834	
September 9	2:30 p.m.	Iowa	**Iowa State**	Jack Trice Stadium • Ames, IA (Cy-Hawk Series)	FOX	**L** 13–20	61,500	
September 9	5:00 p.m.	SMU	No. 18 **Oklahoma**	Gaylord Family Oklahoma Memorial Stadium • Norman, OK	ESPN+	**W** 28–11	84,186	
September 9	5:00 p.m.	Duquesne	**West Virginia**	Milan Puskar Stadium • Morgantown, WV	ESPN+	**W** 56–17	50,037	
September 9	5:30 p.m.	**Cincinnati**	Pittsburgh	Acrisure Stadium • Pittsburgh, PA (River City Rivalry)	The CW	**W** 27–21	49,398	
September 9	6:00 p.m.	No. 13 Oregon	**Texas Tech**	Jones AT&T Stadium • Lubbock, TX	FOX	**L** 30–38	56,200	
September 9	6:00 p.m.	No. 11 **Texas**	No. 3 Alabama	Bryant–Denny Stadium • Tuscaloosa, AL	ESPN	**W** 34–24	100,077	
September 9	6:00 p.m.	**UCF**	Boise State	Albertsons Stadium • Boise, ID	FS1	**W** 18–16	36,447	
September 9	6:00 p.m.	**Houston**	Rice	Rice Stadium • Houston, TX (Bayou Bucket Classic)	NFLN	**L** 41–43 ^{2OT}	23,425	
September 9	7:00 p.m.	Nicholls	**TCU**	Amon G. Carter Stadium • Fort Worth, TX	ESPN+	**W** 41–6	45,010	
September 9	9:30 p.m.	**Oklahoma State**	Arizona State	Mountain America Stadium • Tempe, AZ	FS1	**W** 27–15	42,569	
^{#}Rankings from AP Poll released prior to game. All times are in Central Time.

==== Week Three ====
Date	Time	Visiting team	Home team	Site	TV	Result	Attendance	Ref.
September 16	11:00 a.m.	No. 15 **Kansas State**	Missouri	Faurot Field • Columbia, MO	SECN	**L** 27–30	62,621	
September 16	11:00 a.m.	**Iowa State**	Ohio	Peden Stadium • Athens, OH	ESPNU	**L** 7–10	21,991	
September 16	11:00 a.m.	LIU	**Baylor**	McLane Stadium • Waco, TX	ESPN+	**W** 30–7	43,732	
September 16	2:30 p.m.	No. 19 **Oklahoma**	Tulsa	Skelly Field at H. A. Chapman Stadium • Tulsa, OK	ESPN2	**W** 66–17	30,855	
September 16	5:30 p.m.	No. 24 (FCS) Villanova	**UCF**	FBC Mortgage Stadium • Orlando, FL	ESPN+	**W** 48–14	44,206	
September 16	6:00 p.m.	Tarleton State	**Texas Tech**	Jones AT&T Stadium • Lubbock, TX	ESPN+	**W** 41–3	56,200	
September 16	6:00 p.m.	South Alabama	**Oklahoma State**	Boone Pickens Stadium • Stillwater, OK	ESPN+	**L** 7–33	53,855	
September 16	6:00 p.m.	Miami (OH)	**Cincinnati**	Nippert Stadium • Cincinnati, OH (Victory Bell)	ESPN+	**L** 24–31 ^{OT}	38,193	
September 16	6:30 p.m.	Pittsburgh	**West Virginia**	Milan Puskar Stadium • Morgantown, WV (Backyard Brawl)	ABC	**W** 17–6	61,106	
September 16	6:30 p.m.	**BYU**	Arkansas	Donald W. Reynolds Razorback Stadium • Fayetteville, AR	ESPN2	**W** 38–31	74,821	
September 16	7:00 p.m.	Wyoming	No. 4 **Texas**	Darrell K Royal–Texas Memorial Stadium • Austin, TX	LHN	**W** 31–10	101,777	
September 16	7:00 p.m.	**TCU**	**Houston**	TDECU Stadium • Houston, TX	FOX	**TCU** 36–13	36,049	
September 16	9:30 p.m.	**Kansas**	Nevada	Mackay Stadium • Reno, NV	CBSSN	**W** 31-24	44,182	
^{#}Rankings from AP Poll released prior to game. All times are in Central Time.

==== Week Four ====
Date	Time	Visiting team	Home team	Site	TV	Result	Attendance	Ref.
September 23	11:00 a.m.	No. 16 **Oklahoma**	Cincinnati	Nippert Stadium • Cincinnati, OH	FOX	**OU** 20–6	38,193	
September 23	11:00 a.m.	SMU	TCU	Amon G. Carter Stadium • Fort Worth, TX (Iron Skillet)	FS1	**W** 34–17	51,243	
September 23	2:30 p.m.	**BYU**	Kansas	David Booth Kansas Memorial Stadium • Lawrence, KS	ESPN	**KU** 38–27	47,233	
September 23	2:30 p.m.	**Texas Tech**	West Virginia	Milan Puskar Stadium • Morgantown, WV	ESPN+	**WVU** 20–13	50,071	
September 23	3:00 p.m.	**Oklahoma State**	Iowa State	Jack Trice Stadium • Ames, IA	FS1	**ISU** 34–27	59,022	
September 23	6:00 p.m.	Sam Houston	Houston	TDECU Stadium • Houston, TX	ESPN+	**W** 38–7	35,044	
September 23	6:30 p.m.	No. 3 **Texas**	Baylor	McLane Stadium • Waco, TX	ABC	**TEX** 38–6	49,165	
September 23	7:00 p.m.	**UCF**	Kansas State	Bill Snyder Family Football Stadium • Manhattan, KS	FS1	**KSU** 44–31	51,912	
^{#}Rankings from AP Poll released prior to game. All times are in Central Time.

==== Week Five ====
Date	Time	Visiting team	Home team	Site	TV	Result	Attendance	Ref.
September 29	9:15 p.m.	**Cincinnati**	**BYU**	LaVell Edwards Stadium • Provo, UT	ESPN	**BYU** 35–27	63,834	
September 30	2:30 p.m.	No. 24 **Kansas**	No. 3 **Texas**	Darrell K Royal–Texas Memorial Stadium • Austin, TX	ABC	**TEX** 40–14	102,986	
September 30	2:30 p.m.	**Baylor**	**UCF**	FBC Mortgage Stadium • Orlando, FL	FS1	**BAY** 36–35	44,005	
September 30	2:30 p.m.	**Houston**	**Texas Tech**	Jones AT&T Stadium • Lubbock, TX	FS2	**TTU** 49–28	53,308	
September 30	6:00 p.m.	**Iowa State**	No. 14 **Oklahoma**	Gaylord Family Oklahoma Memorial Stadium • Norman, OK	FS1	**OU** 50–20	84,371	
September 30	7:00 p.m.	**West Virginia**	**TCU**	Amon G. Carter Stadium • Fort Worth, TX	ESPN2	**WVU** 24–21	43,736	
^{#}Rankings from AP Poll released prior to game. All times are in Central Time.

==== Week Six ====
Date	Time	Visiting team	Home team	Site	TV	Result	Attendance	Ref.
October 6	6:30 p.m.	**Kansas State**	**Oklahoma State**	Boone Pickens Stadium • Stillwater, OK	ESPN	**OKST** 29–21	53,855	
October 7	11:00 a.m.	No. 3 **Texas**	No. 12 **Oklahoma**	Cotton Bowl • Dallas, TX (Red River Showdown/College GameDay)	ABC	**OU** 34–30	92,100	
October 7	3:00 p.m.	**UCF**	**Kansas**	David Booth Kansas Memorial Stadium • Lawrence, KS	FOX	**KU** 51–22	46,107	
October 7	7:00 p.m.	**Texas Tech**	**Baylor**	McLane Stadium • Waco, TX	ESPN2	**TTU** 39–14	44,620	
October 7	7:00 p.m.	**TCU**	**Iowa State**	Jack Trice Stadium • Ames, IA	FS1	**ISU** 27–14	60,535	
^{#}Rankings from AP Poll released prior to game. All times are in Central Time.

==== Week Seven ====
Date	Time	Visiting team	Home team	Site	TV	Result	Attendance	Ref.
October 12	6:00 p.m.	**West Virginia**	**Houston**	TDECU Stadium • Houston, TX	FS1	**HOU** 41–39	32,152	
October 14	11:00 a.m.	**Iowa State**	**Cincinnati**	Nippert Stadium • Cincinnati, OH	FS1	**ISU** 30–10	38,193	
October 14	2:30 p.m.	**BYU**	**TCU**	Amon G. Carter Stadium • Fort Worth, TX	ESPN	**TCU** 44–11	44,599	
October 14	2:30 p.m.	No. 23 **Kansas**	**Oklahoma State**	Boone Pickens Stadium • Stillwater, OK	FS1	**OKST** 39–32	53,855	
October 14	6:00 p.m.	**Kansas State**	**Texas Tech**	Jones AT&T Stadium • Lubbock, TX	FS1	**KSU** 38–21	56,200	
^{#}Rankings from AP Poll released prior to game. All times are in Central Time.

==== Week Eight ====
Date	Time	Visiting team	Home team	Site	TV	Result	Attendance	Ref.
October 21	11:00 AM	**Baylor**	**Cincinnati**	Nippert Stadium • Cincinnati, OH	ESPN+	**BAY** 32–29	38,193	
October 21	11:00 AM	**UCF**	No. 6 **Oklahoma**	Gaylord Family Oklahoma Memorial Stadium • Norman, OK	ABC	**OU** 31–29	83,476	
October 21	2:30 PM	**Oklahoma State**	**West Virginia**	Milan Puskar Stadium • Morgantown, WV	ESPN	**OKST** 48–34	51,870	
October 21	3:00 PM	No. 8 **Texas**	**Houston**	TDECU Stadium • Houston, TX	FOX	**TEX** 31–24	42,812	
October 21	6:00 PM	**Texas Tech**	**BYU**	LaVell Edwards Stadium • Provo, UT	FS1	**BYU** 27–14	63,523	
October 21	6:00 PM	**TCU**	**Kansas State**	Bill Snyder Family Football Stadium • Manhattan, KS	ESPN2	**KSU** 41–3	52,580	
^{#}Rankings from AP Poll released prior to game. All times are in Central Time.

==== Week Nine ====
Date	Time	Visiting team	Home team	Site	TV	Result	Attendance	Ref.
October 28	11:00 a.m.	No. 6 **Oklahoma**	**Kansas**	David Booth Kansas Memorial Stadium • Lawrence, KS (Big Noon Kickoff)	FOX	**KU** 38–33	47,233	
October 28	11:00 a.m.	**Houston**	**Kansas State**	Bill Snyder Family Football Stadium • Manhattan, KS	ESPN2	**KSU** 41–0	51,928	
October 28	11:00 a.m.	**West Virginia**	**UCF**	FBC Mortgage Stadium • Orlando, FL	FS1	**WVU** 41–28	44,136	
October 28	2:30 p.m.	**BYU**	No. 7 **Texas**	Darrell K Royal–Texas Memorial Stadium • Austin, TX	ABC	**TEX** 35–6	101,670	
October 28	2:30 p.m.	**Iowa State**	**Baylor**	McLane Stadium • Waco, TX	ESPN+	**ISU** 30–18	43,528	
October 28	7:00 p.m.	**Cincinnati**	**Oklahoma State**	Boone Pickens Stadium • Stillwater, OK	ESPN2	**OKST** 45–13	53,855	
^{#}Rankings from AP Poll released prior to game. All times are in Central Time.

==== Week Ten ====
Date	Time	Visiting team	Home team	Site	TV	Result	Attendance	Ref.
November 2	6:00 p.m.	**TCU**	**Texas Tech**	Jones AT&T Stadium • Lubbock, TX (West Texas Championship)	FS1	**TTU** 35–28	51,185	
November 4	11:00 a.m.	No. 23 **Kansas State**	No. 7 **Texas**	Darrell K Royal–Texas Memorial Stadium • Austin, TX	FOX	**TEX** 33–30 ^{OT}	102,846	
November 4	2:30 p.m.	No. 9 **Oklahoma**	No. 22 **Oklahoma State**	Boone Pickens Stadium • Stillwater, OK (Bedlam)	ABC	**OKST** 27–24	54,105	
November 4	2:30 p.m.	**UCF**	**Cincinnati**	Nippert Stadium • Cincinnati, OH (rivalry)	FS1	**UCF** 28–26	38,193	
November 4	2:30 p.m.	**Houston**	**Baylor**	McLane Stadium • Waco, TX	ESPN+	**HOU** 25–24 ^{OT}	41,180	
November 4	6:00 p.m.	**BYU**	**West Virginia**	Milan Puskar Stadium • Morgantown, WV	FOX	**WVU** 37–7	50,266	
November 4	6:00 p.m.	No. 21 **Kansas**	**Iowa State**	Jack Trice Stadium • Ames, IA	ESPN	**KU** 28–21	61,500	
^{#}Rankings from College Football Playoff. All times are in Central Time.

==== Week Eleven ====
Date	Time	Visiting team	Home team	Site	TV	Result	Attendance	Ref.
November 11	11:00 a.m.	**Texas Tech**	No. 16 **Kansas**	David Booth Kansas Memorial Stadium • Lawrence, KS	FS1	**TTU** 16–13	47,233	
November 11	2:00 p.m.	**Baylor**	No. 25 **Kansas State**	Bill Snyder Family Football Stadium • Manhattan, KS	ESPN+	**KSU** 59–25	51,790	
November 11	2:30 p.m.	No. 15 **Oklahoma State**	**UCF**	FBC Mortgage Stadium • Orlando, FL	ESPN	**UCF** 45–3	44,046	
November 11	6:00 p.m.	**West Virginia**	No. 17 **Oklahoma**	Gaylord Family Oklahoma Memorial Stadium • Norman, OK	FOX	**OU** 59–20	83,525	
November 11	6:00 p.m.	**Cincinnati**	**Houston**	TDECU Stadium • Houston, TX	FS1	**CIN** 24–14	34,312	
November 11	6:30 p.m.	No. 7 **Texas**	**TCU**	Amon G. Carter Stadium • Fort Worth, TX (rivalry)	ABC	**TEX** 29–26	50,812	
November 11	9:15 p.m.	**Iowa State**	**BYU**	LaVell Edwards Stadium • Provo, UT	ESPN	**ISU** 45-13	60,754	
^{#}Rankings from College Football Playoff. All times are in Central Time.

==== Week Twelve ====
Date	Time	Visiting team	Home team	Site	TV	Result	Attendance	Ref.
November 18	11:00 a.m.	No. 14 **Oklahoma**	**BYU**	LaVell Edwards Stadium • Provo, UT	ESPN	**OU** 31–24	63,714	
November 18	1:30 p.m.	**Cincinnati**	**West Virginia**	Milan Puskar Stadium • Morgantown, WV (rivalry)	ESPN+	**WVU** 42–21	43,588	
November 18	2:30 p.m.	**Baylor**	**TCU**	Amon G. Carter Stadium • Fort Worth, TX (The Revivalry)	ESPN+	**TCU** 42–17	42,621	
November 18	3:00 p.m.	No. 23 **Oklahoma State**	**Houston**	TDECU Stadium • Houston, TX	ESPN2	**OKST** 43–30	33,906	
November 18	4:00 p.m.	**UCF**	**Texas Tech**	Jones AT&T Stadium • Lubbock, TX	FS2	**TTU** 24–23	53,851	
November 18	6:00 p.m.	No. 21 **Kansas State**	No. 25 **Kansas**	David Booth Kansas Memorial Stadium • Lawrence, KS (Sunflower Showdown)	FS1	**KSU** 31–27	47,233	
November 18	7:00 p.m.	No. 7 **Texas**	**Iowa State**	Jack Trice Stadium • Ames, IA	FOX	**TEX** 26–16	61,500	
^{#}Rankings from College Football Playoff. All times are in Central Time.

==== Week Thirteen ====
Date	Time	Visiting team	Home team	Site	TV	Result	Attendance	Ref.
November 24	11:00 a.m.	TCU	No. 13 **Oklahoma**	Gaylord Family Oklahoma Memorial Stadium • Norman, OK	FOX	**OU** 69–45	83,669	
November 24	6:30 p.m.	Texas Tech	No. 7 **Texas**	Darrell K Royal–Texas Memorial Stadium • Austin, TX (Battle for the Chancellor's Spurs)	ABC	**TEX** 57–7	102,452	
November 25	11:00 a.m.	Houston	**UCF**	FBC Mortgage Stadium • Orlando, FL	FS1	**UCF** 27–13	43,610	
November 25	2:30 p.m.	BYU	No. 20 **Oklahoma State**	Boone Pickens Stadium • Stillwater, OK	ABC	**OKST** 40–34 ^{2OT}	53,855	
November 25	6:00 p.m.	West Virginia	**Baylor**	McLane Stadium • Waco, TX	FS1	**WVU** 34–31	36,200	
November 25	6:30 p.m.	Kansas	**Cincinnati**	Nippert Stadium • Cincinnati, OH	ESPN2	**KU** 49–16	38,193	
November 25	7:00 p.m.	Iowa State	No. 19 **Kansas State**	Bill Snyder Family Football Stadium • Manhattan, KS (Farmageddon)	FOX	**ISU** 42–35	51,481	
^{#}Rankings from College Football Playoff. All times are in Central Time.

=== Championship Game ===
Date	Time	Visiting team	Home team	Site	TV	Result	Attendance	Ref.
December 2	11:00 a.m.	No. 18 **Oklahoma State**	No. 7 **Texas**	AT&T Stadium • Arlington, Texas	ABC	**TEX** 49–21	84,523	
^{#}Rankings from College Football Playoff. All times are in Central Time.

== Postseason ==
=== Bowl games ===
Legend
Big 12 win
Big 12 loss

For the 2020–2025 bowl cycle, The Big 12 will have annual appearances in the following bowls: Sugar Bowl (unless the Sugar Bowl is a CFP game), First Responder Bowl, Liberty Bowl, Alamo Bowl, Guaranteed Rate Bowl, Pop-Tarts Bowl, and Texas Bowl. Big 12 teams will play in a New Year's Six bowl if they are ranked high enough for an at-large bid in the final CFP rankings. The Big 12 champions are also eligible for the College Football Playoff if they're among the top four teams in the final CFP ranking.

Bowl game	Date	Site	Time (CST)	Television	Big 12 team	Opponent	Score	Attendance
Independence Bowl	December 16, 2023	Independence Stadium • Shreveport, LA	8:15 p.m.	ESPN	Texas Tech	California	**W** 34–14	33,071
Gasparilla Bowl	December 22, 2023	Raymond James Stadium • Tampa, FL	5:30 p.m.	ESPN	UCF	Georgia Tech	**L** 17–30	30,281
Guaranteed Rate Bowl	December 26, 2023	Chase Field • Phoenix, AZ	8:00 p.m.	ESPN	Kansas	UNLV	**W** 49–36	26,478
Duke's Mayo Bowl	December 27, 2023	Bank of America Stadium • Charlotte, NC	4:30 p.m.	ESPN	West Virginia	North Carolina	**W** 30–10	42,925
Texas Bowl	December 27, 2023	NRG Stadium • Houston, TX	8:00 p.m.	ESPN	No. 20 Oklahoma State	Texas A&M	**W** 31–23	55,212
Pop-Tarts Bowl	December 28, 2023	Camping World Stadium • Orlando, FL	4:45 p.m.	ESPN	No. 25 Kansas State	No. 18 NC State	**W** 28–19	31,111
Alamo Bowl	December 28, 2023	Alamodome • San Antonio, TX	8:15 p.m.	ESPN	No. 12 Oklahoma	No. 14 Arizona	**L** 24–38	55,883
Liberty Bowl	December 29, 2023	Simmons Bank Liberty Stadium • Memphis, TN	2:30 p.m.	ESPN	Iowa State	Memphis	**L** 26–36	48,789
**College Football Playoff bowl games**
Sugar Bowl	January 1, 2024	Caesars Superdome • New Orleans, LA	7:45 p.m.	ESPN	No. 3 Texas	No. 2 Washington	**L** 31–37	68,791

Rankings are from CFP rankings. All times Central Time Zone. Big-12 teams shown in bold.

== Head to head matchups ==
Head to head Source:
Team	Baylor	BYU	Cincinnati	Houston	Iowa State	Kansas	Kansas State	Oklahoma	Oklahoma State	TCU	Texas	Texas Tech	UCF	West Virginia
Baylor	—	*	L	W	W	*	W	*	*	W	W	W	L	W
BYU	*	—	L	*	W	W	*	W	W	W	W	L	*	W
Cincinnati	W	W	—	L	W	W	*	W	W	*	*	*	W	W
Houston	L	*	W	—	*	*	W	*	W	W	W	W	W	L
Iowa State	L	L	L	*	—	W	L	W	L	L	W	*	*	*
Kansas	*	L	L	*	L	—	W	L	W	*	W	W	L	*
Kansas State	L	*	*	L	W	L	—	*	W	L	W	L	L	*
Oklahoma	*	L	L	*	L	W	*	—	W	L	L	*	L	L
Oklahoma State	*	L	L	L	W	L	L	L	—	*	*	*	W	L
TCU	L	L	*	L	W	*	W	W	*	—	W	W	*	W
Texas	L	L	*	L	L	L	L	W	*	L	—	L	*	*
Texas Tech	L	W	*	L	*	L	W	*	*	L	W	—	L	W
UCF	W	*	L	L	*	W	W	W	L	*	*	W	—	W
West Virginia	L	L	L	W	*	*	*	W	W	L	*	L	L	—

* Do not play during regular season

Updated with the results of November 25, 2023.

=== Big 12 vs Power 5 matchups ===
This is a list of the Power Five conferences teams (ACC, Big Ten, Pac-12, Notre Dame and SEC).

Date	Big 12 Team	Opponent	Conference	Location	Result
September 2	#17 TCU	Colorado	Pac-12	Amon G. Carter Stadium • Fort Worth, TX	L 42–45
September 2	West Virginia	#7 Penn State	Big Ten	Beaver Stadium • University Park, PA (PSU-WVU rivalry)	L 15–38
September 8	Kansas	Illinois	Big Ten	Memorial Stadium • Lawrence, KS	W 34–23
September 9	Cincinnati	Pittsburgh	ACC	Acrisure Stadium • Pittsburgh, PA (River City Rivalry)	W 27–21
September 9	Iowa State	Iowa	Big Ten	Jack Trice Stadium • Ames, IA (Cy-Hawk Series)	L 13–20
September 9	Oklahoma State	Arizona State	Pac-12	Mountain America Stadium • Tempe, AZ	W 27–15
September 9	Texas Tech	Oregon	Pac-12	Jones AT&T Stadium • Lubbock, TX	L 30–38
September 9	Baylor	Utah	Pac-12	McLane Stadium • Waco, TX	L 13–20
September 9	#11 Texas	#3 Alabama	SEC	Bryant-Denny Stadium • Tuscaloosa, AL	W 34–24
September 16	West Virginia	Pittsburgh	ACC	Milan Puskar Stadium • Morgantown, WV (Backyard Brawl)	W 17–6
September 16	BYU	Arkansas	SEC	Donald W. Reynolds Razorback Stadium • Fayetteville, AR	W 38–31
September 16	Kansas State	Missouri	SEC	Faurot Field • Columbia, MO	L 27–30

=== Big 12 vs Group of Five matchups ===
The following games include Big 12 teams competing against teams from The American, C-USA, MAC, Mountain West or Sun Belt.

Date	Conference	Visitor	Home	Site	Score
August 31	MAC	Kent State	UCF	FBC Mortgage Stadium • Orlando, FL	W 56–6
September 2	Sun Belt	Arkansas State	#20 Oklahoma	Gaylord Family Oklahoma Memorial Stadium • Norman, OK	W 73–0
September 2	American	Rice	#11 Texas	Darrell K Royal–Texas Memorial Stadium • Austin, TX	W 37–10
September 2	American	UTSA	Houston	TDECU Stadium • Houston, TX	W 17–14
September 2	C-USA	Sam Houston	BYU	LaVell Edwards Stadium • Provo, UT	W 14–0
September 2	Mountain West	Texas Tech	Wyoming	War Memorial Stadium • Laramie, WY	L 33–35 ^{2OT}
September 2	Sun Belt	Texas State	Baylor	McLane Stadium • Waco, TX	L 31–42
September 9	American	Houston	Rice	Rice Stadium • Houston, TX	L 41–43 ^{2OT}
September 9	American	SMU	Oklahoma	Gaylord Family Oklahoma Memorial Stadium • Norman, OK	W 28–11
September 9	Mountain West	UCF	Boise State	Albertsons Stadium • Boise, ID	W 18–16
September 9	Sun Belt	Troy	Kansas State	Bill Snyder Family Football Stadium • Manhattan, KS	W 42–13
September 16	American	Oklahoma	Tulsa	H. A. Chapman Stadium • Tulsa, OK	W 66–17
September 16	MAC	Iowa State	Ohio	Peden Stadium • Athens, OH	L 7–10
September 16	MAC	Miami (OH)	Cincinnati	Nippert Stadium • Cincinnati, OH	L 24–31 ^{OT}
September 16	Mountain West	Kansas	Nevada	Mackay Stadium • Reno, NV	W 31–24
September 16	Mountain West	Wyoming	#4 Texas	Darrell K Royal–Texas Memorial Stadium • Austin, TX	W 31–10
September 16	Sun Belt	South Alabama	Oklahoma State	Boone Pickens Stadium • Stillwater, OK	L 7–33
September 23	American	SMU	TCU	Amon G. Carter Stadium • Fort Worth, TX (Iron Skillet)	W 34–17
September 23	C-USA	Sam Houston	Houston	TDECU Stadium • Houston, TX	W 38–7

=== Big 12 vs FCS matchups ===
The Football Championship Subdivision comprises 13 conferences and two independent programs.

Date	Conference	Visitor	Home	Site	Score
September 1	Missouri Valley	Missouri State	Kansas	David Booth Kansas Memorial Stadium • Lawrence, KS	W 48–17
September 2	United Athletic	Eastern Kentucky	Cincinnati	Nippert Stadium • Cincinnati, OH	W 66–13
September 2	Missouri Valley	Northern Iowa	Iowa State	Jack Trice Stadium • Ames, IA	W 30–9
September 2	Ohio Valley	Southeast Missouri State	Kansas State	Bill Snyder Family Football Stadium • Manhattan, KS	W 45–0
September 2	United Athletic	Central Arkansas	Oklahoma State	Boone Pickens Stadium • Stillwater, OK	W 27–13
September 9	United Athletic	Southern Utah	BYU	LaVell Edwards Stadium • Provo, UT	W 41–16
September 9	Northeast	Duquesne	West Virginia	Milan Puskar Stadium • Morgantown, WV	W 56–17
September 9	Southland	Nicholls	TCU	Amon G. Carter Stadium • Fort Worth, TX	W 41–6
September 16	Northeast	LIU	Baylor	McLane Stadium • Waco, TX	W 30–7
September 16	CAA	Villanova	UCF	FBC Mortgage Stadium • Orlando, FL	W 48–14
September 16	United Athletic	Tarleton State	Texas Tech	Jones AT&T Stadium • Lubbock, TX	W 41–3

=== Big 12 vs other conferences ===
Regular Season

Power 5 Conferences	Record
ACC	2–0
Big Ten	1–2
Notre Dame	0–0
Pac-12	1–3
SEC	2–1
Power 5 Total	6–6
Other FBS Conferences	Record
American	5–1
C–USA	2–0
Independents (Excluding Notre Dame)	0–0
MAC	1–2
Mountain West	3–1
Sun Belt	2–2
Other FBS Total	13–6
FCS Opponents	Record
Football Championship Subdivision	11–0
Total Non-Conference Record	30–12

Post Season

Power 5 Conferences	Record
ACC	2–1
Big Ten	0–0
Notre Dame	0–0
Pac-12	1–2
SEC	1–0
Power 5 Total	4–3
Other FBS Conferences	Record
American	0–1
C–USA	0–0
Independents (Excluding Notre Dame)	0–0
MAC	0–0
Mountain West	1–0
Sun Belt	0–0
Other FBS Total	1–1
Total Bowl Record	5–4

== Television Selections ==
The Big 12 Conference has television contracts with ESPN and FOX, which allow games to be broadcast across ABC, ESPN, ESPN2, ESPNU, FOX, FS1 and FS2. Streaming broadcasts for games under Big 12 control are streamed on ESPN+. Texas operates its own network, Longhorn Network, in conjunction with ESPN. Games under the control of other conferences fall under the contracts of the opposing conference.

Network	Wk 1	Wk 2	Wk 3	Wk 4	Wk 5	Wk 6	Wk 7	Wk 8	Wk 9	Wk 10	Wk 11	Wk 12	Wk 13	C	Bowls	Totals
ABC			1	1	1	1		1	1	1	1		2	1		11
ESPN	1	2		1	1	1	1	1		1	2	1			9	21
ESPN2		1	2		1	1		1	2			1	1			10
ESPNU			1													1
Longhorn Network			1													1
FOX	2	2	1	1		1		1	1	2	1	1	2			15
FS1	3	3		3	2	1	4	1	1	1	2	1	2			24
FS2					1							1				2
CBS	1															1
NBC	1															1
The CW		1														1
CBS Sports Network			1													1
NFL Network		1														1
SEC Network			1													1
ESPN+ (streaming)	6	4	5	2	-	-	-	1	1	1	1	2				23

Platform	Games
Broadcast	29
Cable	62
Streaming	23

== Awards and honors ==
=== Players of the week ===
Week	Offensive			Defensive			Special Teams			Newcomer		
Week	Player	Team	Position	Player	Team	Position	Player	Team	Position	Player	Team	Position
Week 1	Emory Jones	UC	QB	Jeremiah Cooper	ISU	DB	Ryan Rehkow	BYU	P	Emory Jones	UC	QB
Week 1	Emory Jones	UC	QB	Jeremiah Cooper	ISU	DB	Gavin Freeman	OU	PR/KR	Emory Jones	UC	QB
Week 2	Quinn Ewers	UT	QB	Danny Stutsman	OU	LB	Colton Boomer	UCF	K	Adonai Mitchell	UT	WR
Week 3	Dillon Gabriel	OU	QB	Tyler Batty	BYU	DE	Matthew Golden	UH	KR/WR	Nic Anderson	OU	WR
Week 4	DJ Giddens	KSU	RB	Cobee Bryant	KU	CB	Chase Contreraz	ISU	K	Parker Jenkins	UH	RB
Week 5	Jonathon Brooks	UT	RB	Caden Jenkins	BU	CB	Loic Fouonji	TTU	WR	Adonai Mitchell	UT	WR
Week 6	Dillon Gabriel	OU	QB	Beau Freyler	ISU	SAF	Trevor Wilson	KU	WR/PR	Cameron Epps	OSU	CB
Week 7	Josh Hoover	TCU	QB	Kobe Savage	KSU	SAF	Chase Contreraz	ISU	K	Avery Johnson	KSU	QB
Week 7	Ollie Gordon II	OSU	RB	Kobe Savage	KSU	SAF	Chase Contreraz	ISU	K	Avery Johnson	KSU	QB
Week 8	Ollie Gordon II	OSU	RB	Eddie Heckard	BYU	CB	Isaiah Hankins	BU	K	Nic Anderson	OU	WR
Week 9	Ollie Gordon II	OSU	RB	Beanie Bishop Jr.	WVU	CB	Xavier Worthy	UT	WR/PR	Leon Johnson III	OSU	WR
Week 9	Ollie Gordon II	OSU	RB	Beanie Bishop Jr.	WVU	CB	Xavier Worthy	UT	WR/PR	Beanie Bishop Jr.	WVU	CB
Week 10	RJ Harvey	UCF	RB	Xavier Benson	OSU	LB	Bert Auburn	UT	K	Adonai Mitchell	UT	WR
Week 10	Ollie Gordon II	OSU	RB	Xavier Benson	OSU	LB	Bert Auburn	UT	K	Adonai Mitchell	UT	WR
Week 11	Dillon Gabriel	OU	QB	Demari Henderson	UCF	DB	Gino Garcia	TTU	K	Abu Sama III	ISU	RB
Week 12	Jared Wiley	TCU	TE	Billy Bowman	OU	SAF	Keenan Garber	KSU	CB	Jahiem White	WVU	RB
Week 13	Abu Sama III	ISU	RB	Trey Rucker	OSU	SAF	Richard Reese	BU	KR	Abu Sama III	ISU	RB

==== Totals per school ====
School	Total
Oklahoma	8
Oklahoma State	8
Iowa State	7
Texas	7
Kansas State	4
Baylor	3
BYU	3
UCF	3
West Virginia	3
Cincinnati	2
Houston	2
Kansas	2
TCU	2
Texas Tech	2

=== Big 12 Individual Awards ===
The following individuals received postseason honors as voted by the Big 12 Conference coaches at the end of the season.

Award	Player	School
Offensive Player of the Year	Ollie Gordon II	Oklahoma State
Defensive Player of the Year	T’Vondre Sweat	Texas
Special Teams Player of the Year	Austin McNamara	Texas Tech
Offensive Freshman of the Year	Rocco Becht	Iowa State
Offensive Lineman of the Year	Cooper Beebe	Kansas State
Defensive Freshman of the Year	Anthony Hill Jr.	Texas
Defensive Freshman of the Year	Ben Roberts	Texas Tech
Defensive Lineman of the Year	Byron Murphy II	Texas
Offensive Newcomer of the Year	Adonai Mitchell	Texas
Defensive Newcomer of the Year	Austin Booker	Kansas
Chuck Neinas Coach of the Year	Mike Gundy	Oklahoma State
# - Unanimous choice

=== All-Americans ===
Currently, the NCAA compiles consensus all-America teams in the sports of Division I-FBS football and Division I men's basketball using a point system computed from All-America teams named by coaches associations or media sources. The system consists of three points for a first-team honor, two points for second-team honor, and one point for third-team honor. Honorable mention and fourth team or lower recognitions are not accorded any points. College Football All-American consensus teams are compiled by position and the player accumulating the most points at each position is named first team consensus all-American. Currently, the NCAA recognizes All-Americans selected by the AP, AFCA, FWAA, TSN, and the WCFF to determine Consensus and Unanimous All-Americans. Any player named to the First Team by all five of the NCAA-recognized selectors is deemed a Unanimous All-American.

Position	Player	School	Selector	Unanimous	Consensus
First Team All-Americans
OL	Cooper Beebe	Kansas State	AFCA, AP, FWAA, TSN, WCFF, CBS, The Athletic, Fox, SI, USAT	✓	✓
DB	Beanie Bishop Jr.	West Virginia	FWAA, WCFF		✓
DB	Billy Bowman Jr.	Oklahoma	CBS		
RB	Ollie Gordon II	Oklahoma State	AFCA, AP, FWAA, TSN, WCFF, CBS, The Athletic, Fox, SI, USAT	✓	✓
OL	Luke Kandra	Cincinnati	WCFF		
LB	Danny Stutsman	Oklahoma	WCFF		
DL	T'Vondre Sweat	Texas	AFCA, AP, FWAA, TSN, WCFF, CBS, The Athletic, Fox, SI, USAT	✓	✓
PR	Xavier Worthy	Texas	CBS, The Athletic, Fox		

Position	Player	School	Selector	Unanimous	Consensus
Second Team All-Americans
OL	Kelvin Banks Jr.	Texas	AFCA		
DB	Beanie Bishop Jr.	West Virginia	AFCA, AP, TSN, Fox, USAT		
OL	Zach Frazier	West Virginia	TSN, Fox, USAT, SI		
OL	Tyler Guyton	Oklahoma	Fox		
DL	Byron Murphy II	Texas	AP, TSN, CBS, Fox, SI		
TE	Ja'Tavion Sanders	Texas	CBS		
LB	Danny Stutsman	Oklahoma	CBS, Fox, SI		
AP	Xavier Worthy	Texas	AFCA, FWAA, TSN, USAT		✓

Position	Player	School	Selector	Unanimous	Consensus
Third Team All-Americans
C	Zach Frazier	West Virginia	AP		
TE	Ben Sinnott	Kansas State	AP		
LB	Danny Stutsman	Oklahoma	AP		
AP	Xavier Worthy	Texas	AP		

==== List of All American Teams ====
- American Football Coaches Association All-America Team
- Associated Press All-America Team
- CBS Sports All-America Team
- ESPN All-America Team
- Football Writers Association of America All-America Team
- Fox Sports All-America Team
- The Athletic All-America Team
- Sporting News 2022 College Football All-America Team
- Sports Illustrated
- USA Today All-America Team
- Walter Camp Football Foundation All-America Team
- The Sporting News College Football All-America Team

=== All-conference teams ===
The following players earned All-Big 12 honors. Any teams showing (_) following their name are indicating the number of All-Big 12 Conference Honors awarded to that university for 1st team and 2nd team respectively.

First Team

Position	Player	Class	Team
First Team Offense
QB	Dillon Gabriel	Sr.	Oklahoma
RB	Ollie Gordon II	So.	Oklahoma State
RB	Tahj Brooks	Sr.	Texas Tech
FB	Ben Sinnott†	Jr.	Kansas State
WR	Javon Baker	Sr.	UCF
WR	Drake Stoops	Sr.	Oklahoma
WR	Xavier Worthy‡	Jr.	Texas
TE	Jared Wiley	Sr.	TCU
TE	Ja’Tavion Sanders†	Jr.	Texas
OL	Dominick Puni	Sr.	Kansas
OL	Cooper Beebe†	Sr.	Kansas State
OL	Patrick Paul	Jr.	Houston
OL	Kelvin Banks Jr.†	So.	Texas
OL	Zach Frazier	Jr.	West Virginia
First Team Defense
DL	Tre'Mon Morris-Brash	5th	UCF
DL	Nelson Ceaser	Jr.	Houston
DL	Austin Booker	So.	Kansas
DL	Byron Murphy II	Jr.	Texas
DL	T’Vondre Sweat	Sr.	Texas
LB	Danny Stutsman	Jr.	Oklahoma
LB	Nickolas Martin	So.	Oklahoma State
LB	Jaylan Ford†	Sr.	Texas
DB	Jeremiah Cooper	So.	Iowa State
DB	T. J. Tampa†	Sr.	Iowa State
DB	Cobee Bryant†	Jr.	Kansas
DB	Billy Bowman	Jr.	Oklahoma
DB	Beanie Bishop Jr.	Sr.	West Virginia
First Team Special Teams
PK	Bert Auburn	Jr.	Texas
P	Austin McNamara	Sr.	Texas Tech
RS	Xavier Worthy	Jr.	Texas

Second Team

Position	Player	Class	Team
Second Team Offense
QB	Will Howard	Sr.	Kansas State
RB	Devin Neal	Jr.	Kansas
RB	Jonathon Brooks	So.	Texas
FB	Stevo Klotz	Jr.	Iowa State
WR	Jaylin Noel	Jr.	Iowa State
WR	Brennan Presley	Sr.	Oklahoma State
WR	Adonai Mitchell	Jr.	Texas
TE	Kole Taylor	Jr.	West Virginia
OL	Kingsley Suamataia	So.	BYU
OL	Luke Kandra	Jr.	Cincinnati
OL	Andrew Raym	Sr.	Oklahoma
OL	Brandon Coleman	Sr.	TCU
OL	Wyatt Milum	Jr.	West Virginia
Second Team Defense
DL	Tyler Batty	Jr.	BYU
DL	Dontay Corleone	So.	Cincinnati
DL	Jamaree Caldwell	Jr.	Houston
DL	Khalid Duke	Sr.	Kansas State
DL	Ethan Downs	Jr.	Oklahoma
LB	Jason Johnson	5th	UCF
LB	Austin Moore	Sr.	Kansas State
LB	Collin Oliver	Jr.	Oklahoma State
DB	Kenny Logan Jr.	Sr.	Kansas
DB	Kobe Savage	Sr.	Kansas State
DB	Josh Newton	Sr.	TCU
DB	Dadrion Taylor-Demerson	Sr.	Texas Tech
DB	Jahdae Barron	Sr.	Texas
Second Team Special Teams
PK	Alex Hale	Sr.	Oklahoma State
P	Ryan Rehkow	Jr.	BYU
RS	Matthew Golden	So.	Houston

Notes:

- RS = Return Specialist
- AP/ST = All-Purpose/Special Teams Player (not a kicker or returner)
- † Two-time first team selection;
- ‡ Three-time first team selection

Honorable mentions

- Baylor: Monaray Baldwin (WR), Drake Dabney (TE), TJ Franklin (DL), Gabe Hall (DL), Caden Jenkins (DB, DFoY), Matt Jones (LB), Dawson Pendergrass (OFoY)
- BYU: Tyler Batty (DPoY, DLoY), Kamden Garrett (DB), Eddie Heckard (DB, DNoY), Darius Lassiter (ONoY), Paul Maile (OL), Ryan Rehkow (STPoY), Isaac Rex (TE), Jakob Robinson (DB), Max Tooley (LB)
- Cincinnati: Jowon Briggs (DL), Dontay Corleone (DLoY), Mason Fletcher (P, STPoY), Gavin Gerhardt (OL), Xzavier Henderson (WR), Luke Kandra (OLoY), Deshawn Pace (DB)
- Houston: Samuel Brown (WR), Nelson Ceaser (DPoY, DLoY), Matthew Golden (STPoY), Isaiah Hamilton (DB), Parker Jenkins (ONoY), A. J. Haulcy (DB, DNoY), Patrick Paul (OLoY)
- Iowa State: Benjamin Brahmer (TE), Chase Contreraz (PK, STPoY), Beau Freyler (DB), Jayden Higgins (WR, ONoY), Jarrod Hufford (OL, OLoY), Jaylin Noel (KR/PR, OPoY), Tyler Onyedim (DL), Domonique Orange (DL), Tyler Perkins (P), Jack Sadowsky (DFoY), T. J. Tampa (DPoY), Gerry Vaughn (LB), Malik Verdon (DB)
- Kansas: Lawrence Arnold (WR), Jason Bean (QB), Austin Booker (DLoY), Mello Dotson (DB), Mason Fairchild (TE), Devin Neal (OPoY), Mike Novitsky (OL), Dominick Puni (OLoY), Jereme Robinson (DL)
- Kansas State: Jack Blumer (P), Phillp Brooks (WR, KR/PR), Khalid Duke (DLoY), DJ Giddens (RB), Hayden Gillum (OL), Will Howard (OPoY), Avery Johnson (OFoY), Will Lee III (DB), KT Leveston (OL), Austin Moore (DPoY), Brendan Mott (DL), Jacob Parrish (DB), Seth Porter (STPoY), Desmond Purnell (LB), Austin Romaine (DFoY), Uso Seumalo (DL), Marques Sigle (DNoY, DB), Chris Tennant (PK), Treshaun Ward (ONoY, RB), Carver Willis (OL)
- Oklahoma: Nic Anderson (OFoY, WR), Rondell Bothroyd (DL), Billy Bowman (DPoY), Isaiah Coe (DL), Kendel Dolby (DB), Ethan Downs (DLoY), Jalil Farooq (WR, KR/PR), Gavin Freeman (KR/PR), Dillon Gabriel (OPoY), Tyler Guyton (OL), Kip Lewis (DFoY, LB), McKade Mettauer (OL), Andrew Raym (OLoY), Walter Rouse (OL), Gavin Sawchuk (RB), Tawee Walker (RB), Woodi Washington (DB), Gentry Williams (DB)
- Oklahoma State: Korie Black (DB), Alan Bowman (QB), Braden Cassity (FB), Dalton Cooper (OL), Kendal Daniels (DB), Cameron Epps (DFoY, DB), Anthony Goodlow (DNoY, DLoY, DL), Alex Hale (STPoY), Josiah Johnson (ONoY, TE), Nickolas Martin (DPoY), Joe Michalski (OLoY, OL), Rashod Owens (WR), Brennan Presley (KR/PR), Jake Springfield (OL)
- TCU: Emani Bailey (RB), Shad Banks Jr. (LB), Millard Bradford (DB), Andrew Coker (OL), Brandon Coleman (OLoY), Caleb Fox (DL), Jamoi Hodge (LB), Josh Hoover (OFoY), Griffin Kell (K), Namdi Obiazor (DPoY, LB), Willis Patrick (OL), Mark Perry (DB), JP Richardson (WR), Jaylon Robinson (WR), Jordy Sandy (P), Jared Wiley (OPoY), Damonic Williams (DLoY, DL), Savion Williams (WR)
- Texas: Kelvin Banks Jr. (OLoY), CJ Baxter (OFoY, RB), Jonathon Brooks (OPoY), Terrance Brooks (DB), Ethan Burke (DL), Trill Carter (DNoY), Kitan Crawford (STPoY), Alfred Collins (DL), Quinn Ewers (QB), Gunnar Helm (TE), Anthony Hill (LB), Christian Jones (OL), Jake Majors (OL), Ryan Sanborn (P), Barryn Sorrell (DL), Michael Taaffe (DB), Jerrin Thompson (DB), Jordan Whittington (WR)
- Texas Tech: C.J. Baskerville (DNoY, DB), Tony Bradford Jr. (DL), Tahj Brooks (OPoY), Myles Cole (DL), Baylor Cupp (TE), Malik Dunlap (DB), Gino Garcia (PK), Jaylon Hutchings (DLoY, DL), Bralyn Lux (DB), Drae McCray (ONoY, KR/PR), Monroe Mills (OL), Behren Morton (QB), Jesiah Pierre (LB), Myles Price (WR), Ben Roberts (LB), Caleb Rogers (OL), Rusty Staats (OL), Dadrion Taylor-Demerson (DPoY), Xavier White (WR), Dennis Wilburn (OL)
- UCF: Colton Boomer (PK), Tylan Grable (OL), RJ Harvey (RB), Demari Henderson (DB), Kobe Hudson (WR), Lee Hunter (DL), Malachi Lawrence (DL), Tre'Mon Morris-Brash (DLoY), Lokahi Pauole (OL), Randy Pittman Jr. (OFoY), John Rhys Plumlee (QB), Corey Thornton (DB), Xavier Townsend (KR/PR), John Walker (DFoY)
- West Virginia: Beanie Bishop Jr. (DNoY), Aubrey Burks (DB), Ben Cutter (DFoY), CJ Donaldson (RB), Preston Fox (KR/PR), Zach Frazier (OLoY), Garrett Greene (QB), Lee Kpogba (DL), Mike Lockhart (DL), Michael Hayes (STPoY, PK), Sean Martin (DLoY, DL), Doug Nester (OL), Tomas Rimac (OL), Oliver Straw (P), Kole Taylor (ONoY), Edward Vesterinen (DL), Jahiem White (OFoY), Brandon Yates (OL)

== Rankings ==
Legend
	Improvement in ranking
	Drop in ranking
	Not ranked previous week
	No change in ranking from previous week
RV	Received votes but were not ranked in Top 25 of poll
т	Tied with team above or below also with this symbol

		Pre	Wk 1	Wk 2	Wk 3	Wk 4	Wk 5	Wk 6	Wk 7	Wk 8	Wk 9	Wk 10	Wk 11	Wk 12	Wk 13	Wk 14	Final
Baylor	AP	RV															
Baylor	C	RV															
Baylor	CFP	Not released															
BYU	AP				RV												
BYU	C	RV			RV		RV	RV									
BYU	CFP	Not released															
Cincinnati	AP		RV	RV													
Cincinnati	C			RV													
Cincinnati	CFP	Not released															
Houston	AP		RV														
Houston	C	RV	RV														
Houston	CFP	Not released															
Iowa State	AP		RV														
Iowa State	C																
Iowa State	CFP	Not released															
Kansas	AP			RV	RV	24	RV	23	RV		22	19	RV	RV	RV	RV	23
Kansas	C	RV	RV	RV	RV	24	RV	24	RV	RV	23	18	RV	RV	RV	RV	23
Kansas	CFP	Not released									21	16	25				
Kansas State	AP	16	15	15	RV	RV	RV			RV	25	RV	23	19	RV	RV	18
Kansas State	C	17	15	15	RV	25	RV		RV	RV	RV	RV	24	20	RV	RV	19
Kansas State	CFP	Not released									23	25	21	19	25		
Oklahoma	AP	20	18	19	16	14	12	5	6	6	10	17	14	13	12	12	15
Oklahoma	C	19	17	16	14	14	12	7	7	6	11	16	13	13	12	12	15
Oklahoma	CFP	Not released									9	17	14	13	12	12	
Oklahoma State	AP			RV					RV	RV	RV	15	24	21	19	22	16
Oklahoma State	C	RV	RV	RV					RV	RV	RV	17	25	21	19	21	16
Oklahoma State	CFP	Not released									22	15	23	20	18	20	
TCU	AP	17	RV	RV	RV	RV											
TCU	C	16	RV	RV	RV	RV											
TCU	CFP	Not released															
Texas	AP	11	11	4	3	3	3	9	8	7	7	7	7	7	7	3	3
Texas	C	12	10	6	6	5	4	11	8	7	6	7	7	7	7	4т	4
Texas	CFP	Not released									7	7	7	7	7	3	
Texas Tech	AP	RV	RV														
Texas Tech	C	24	RV														
Texas Tech	CFP	Not released															
UCF	AP		RV														
UCF	C		RV	RV	RV												
UCF	CFP	Not released															
West Virginia	AP						RV	RV	RV			RV					RV
West Virginia	C						RV	RV	RV			RV		RV	RV	RV	25
West Virginia	CFP	Not released															

== Home game announced attendance ==
Team	Stadium	Capacity	Game 1	Game 2	Game 3	Game 4	Game 5	Game 6	Game 7	Game 8	Total	Average	% of capacity
Baylor	McLane Stadium	45,140	44,945	43,732	43,732	**49,165**†	44,620	43,528	41,180	36,200	347,102	43,388	96.1%
BYU	LaVell Edwards Stadium	63,470	59,006	60,834	**63,834**†	**63,523**	60,754	**63,714**			371,665	61,944	97.6%
Cincinnati	Nippert Stadium	38,193	**38,193**†	**38,193**†	**38,193**†	**38,193**†	**38,193**†	**38,193**†	**38,193**†		267,351	38,193	100%
Houston	TDECU Stadium	40,000	37,862	36,049	35,044	32,152	**42,812**†	34,312	33,906		252,137	36,020	90.0%
Iowa State	Jack Trice Stadium	61,500	58,248	**61,500**†‡	59,022	60,535	**61,500**†‡	**61,500**†‡			362,305	60,834	98.2%
Kansas	David Booth Kansas Memorial Stadium	47,233	41,091	45,809	**47,233**†	46,170	**47,233**†	**47,233**†	**47,233**†		322,002	46,000	97.4%
Kansas State	Bill Snyder Family Stadium	50,000	**52,066**	**51,940**	**51,912**	**52,580**†	**51,928**	**51,790**	**51,481**		363,697	51,956	103.9%
Oklahoma	Gaylord Family Oklahoma Memorial Stadium	86,112	83,221	84,186	84,371†	83,476	83,525	83,669			502,448	83,741	97.2%
Oklahoma State	Boone Pickens Stadium	53,855	**53,855**	**53,855**	**53,855**	**53,855**	**53,855**	**54,105†**	**53,855**		377,235	53,891	100.1%
TCU	Amon G. Carter Stadium	46,000	**53,294**†‡	45,010	**51,243**	43,736	44,599	**50,812**	42,261		330,955	47,279	102.8%
Texas	Darrell K Royal–Texas Memorial Stadium	100,119	98,017	**101,777**	**102,986**†	**101,670**	**102,846**	**102,452**			609,748	101,625	101.5%
Texas Tech	Jones AT&T Stadium	56,200	**56,200**†	**56,200**†	53,308	**56,200**†	51,185	53,851			273,093	54,619	97.2%
UCF	FBC Mortgage Stadium	45,301	44,088	44,206†	44,005	44,136	44,046	43,610			264,091	44,015	97.2%
West Virginia	Milan Puskar Stadium	60,000	50,037	**61,106**†	50,071	51,870	50,266	43,588			306,938	51,156	85.3%

Bold – at or exceeded capacity
† Season high
‡ Record stadium Attendance

== NFL draft ==
The NFL draft was held at Campus Martius Park in Detroit, MI. The Following list includes all Big 12 players selected in the draft.

=== List of selections ===
Player	Position	School	Draft Round	Round Pick	Overall Pick	Team
Byron Murphy II	DT	Texas	1	16	16	Seattle Seahawks
Xavier Worthy	WR	Texas	1	28	28	Kansas City Chiefs
Tyler Guyton	OT	Oklahoma	1	29	29	Dallas Cowboys
T'Vondre Sweat	DT	Texas	2	6	38	Tennessee Titans
Jonathon Brooks	RB	Texas	2	14	46	Carolina Panthers
Zach Frazier	C	West Virginia	2	19	51	Pittsburgh Steelers
Adonai Mitchell	WR	Texas	2	20	52	Indianapolis Colts
Ben Sinnott	TE	Kansas State	2	21	53	Washington Commanders
Patrick Paul	OT	Houston	2	23	55	Miami Dolphins
Kingsley Suamataia	OT	BYU	2	31	63	Kansas City Chiefs
Brandon Coleman	OT	TCU	3	3	67	Washington Commanders
Cooper Beebe	OG	Kansas State	3	9	73	Dallas Cowboys
Dominick Puni	OT	Kansas	3	22	86	San Francisco 49ers
Ja'Tavion Sanders	TE	Texas	4	1	101	Carolina Panthers
Dadrion Taylor-Demerson	S	Texas Tech	4	4	104	Arizona Cardinals
Javon Baker	WR	UCF	4	10	110	New England Patriots
T. J. Tampa	CB	Iowa State	4	30	130	Baltimore Ravens
Jared Wiley	TE	TCU	4	31	131	Kansas City Chiefs
Austin Booker	DE	Kansas	5	9	144	Chicago Bears
Josh Newton	CB	TCU	5	14	149	Cincinnati Bengals
Christian Jones	OT	Texas	5	27	162	Arizona Cardinals
Keilan Robinson	RB	Texas	5	32	167	Jacksonville Jaguars
Jaylan Ford	LB	Texas	5	40	175	New Orleans Saints
Walter Rouse	OT	Oklahoma	6	1	177	Minnesota Vikings
Ryan Watts	CB	Texas	6	19	195	Pittsburgh Steelers
Tylan Grable	OT	UCF	6	28	204	Buffalo Bills
Jordan Whittington	WR	Texas	6	37	213	Los Angeles Rams
Jonah Laulu	DT	Oklahoma	7	14	234	Indianapolis Colts
Myles Cole	DE	Texas Tech	7	16	236	Jacksonville Jaguars
Jowon Briggs	DT	Cincinnati	7	23	243	Cleveland Browns
KT Leveston	OG	Kansas State	7	34	254	Los Angeles Rams

=== Total picks by school ===
Team	Round 1	Round 2	Round 3	Round 4	Round 5	Round 6	Round 7	Total
Baylor	–	–	–	–	–	–	–	0
BYU	–	1	–	–	–	–	–	1
Cincinnati	–	–	–	–	–	–	1	1
Houston	–	1	–	–	–	–	–	1
Iowa State	–	–	–	1	–	–	–	1
Kansas	–	–	1	–	1	–	–	2
Kansas State	–	1	1	–	–	–	1	3
Oklahoma	1	–	–	–	–	1	1	3
Oklahoma State	–	–	–	–	–	–	–	0
TCU	–	–	1	1	1	–	–	3
Texas	2	3	–	1	3	2	–	11
Texas Tech	–	–	–	1	–	–	1	2
UCF	–	–	–	1	–	1	–	2
West Virginia	–	1	–	–	–	–	–	1
Total	3	7	3	5	5	4	4	31
