= Josh Newton (American football) =

American football player (born 2000)

No. 28 – Cincinnati Bengals
- Position: Cornerback
- Roster status: Active

Personal information
- Born: September 14, 2000 (age 26); Monroe, Louisiana, U.S.
- Listed height: 5 ft 11 in (1.80 m)
- Listed weight: 190 lb (86 kg)

Career information
- High school: Ouachita Parish (Monroe)
- College: Louisiana–Monroe (2018–2021); TCU (2022–2023)
- NFL draft: 2024: 5th round, 149th overall pick

Career history
- Cincinnati Bengals (2024–present)

Awards and highlights
- First-team All-Big 12 (2022); Second-team All-Big 12 (2023)

Career NFL statistics as of 2025
- Total tackles: 46
- Pass deflections: 10
- Interceptions: 1
- Stats at Pro Football Reference

Josh Newton (born September 14, 2000) is an American professional football cornerback for the Cincinnati Bengals of the National Football League (NFL). He played college football for the Louisiana–Monroe Warhawks and TCU Horned Frogs.

== Early life ==
Newton attended Ouachita Parish High School in Monroe, Louisiana, where he was a two-year starting wide receiver on the football team. As a senior, he earned first-team all-district honors and was selected to play in the LHSCA East-West All-Star Game. Newton committed to play college football at Louisiana–Monroe.

== College career ==
Newton redshirted his freshman season in 2018. In the 2019 spring practices, he was converted to a cornerback. In 2019, Newton recorded 20 tackles and two pass deflections. In week nine of the 2020 season, he picked off a pass by Zac Thomas for his first career interception, but the Warhawks lost to Appalachian State 31–13. Newton finished the 2020 season with 16 tackles with 0.5 being for a loss, five pass deflections, and an interception. In week seven of the 2021 season, he intercepted a pass off Malik Willis in a win over Liberty. In week twelve, Newton made another interception in a defeat to LSU 27–14. He finished the 2021 season with 48 tackles, five of them going for a loss, eight pass deflections, and two interceptions. After the conclusion of the season, Newton entered the transfer portal. He decided to transfer to TCU.

Newton started the 2022 season off hot, as in week two he recorded his first interception with TCU, helping the Horned Frogs beat Tarleton State 59–17. He recorded another interception the following week, picking off a pass by quarterback Tanner Mordecai to help TCU beat SMU 42–34. In TCU's season finale, Newton returned an interception 57 yards for a touchdown, as he helped the Horned Frogs rout Iowa State 62–14. Newton finished the 2022 season with 35 tackles and 2.5 being for a loss, 12 pass deflections, three interceptions, and a touchdown. He earned first-team all Big-12 honors. Newton was named preseason first-team all-Big 12 ahead of the 2023 season. Newton was also named a preseason All-American by Phil Steele and Athlon Sports. Clark was also named to several award watch lists, such as the Jim Thorpe Award, the Bronko Nagurski Trophy, and the Wuerffel Trophy.

== Professional career ==
Pre-draft measurables
Height	Weight	Arm length	Hand span	Wingspan	40-yard dash	10-yard split	20-yard split	20-yard shuttle	Three-cone drill	Vertical jump	Broad jump	Bench press
5 ft 10 5/8 in (1.79 m)	190 lb (86 kg)	31 1/8 in (0.79 m)	9 1/4 in (0.23 m)	6 ft 2 1/4 in (1.89 m)	4.51 s	1.55 s	2.67 s	4.15 s	7.01 s	34.0 in (0.86 m)	10 ft 4 in (3.15 m)	15 reps
All values from NFL Combine

Newton was selected by the Cincinnati Bengals in the 5th round (149th overall) of the 2024 NFL draft. He caught his first career interception during Week 15's road win against the Tennessee Titans.
