= Kenny Logan Jr. =

American gridiron football player (born 2000)

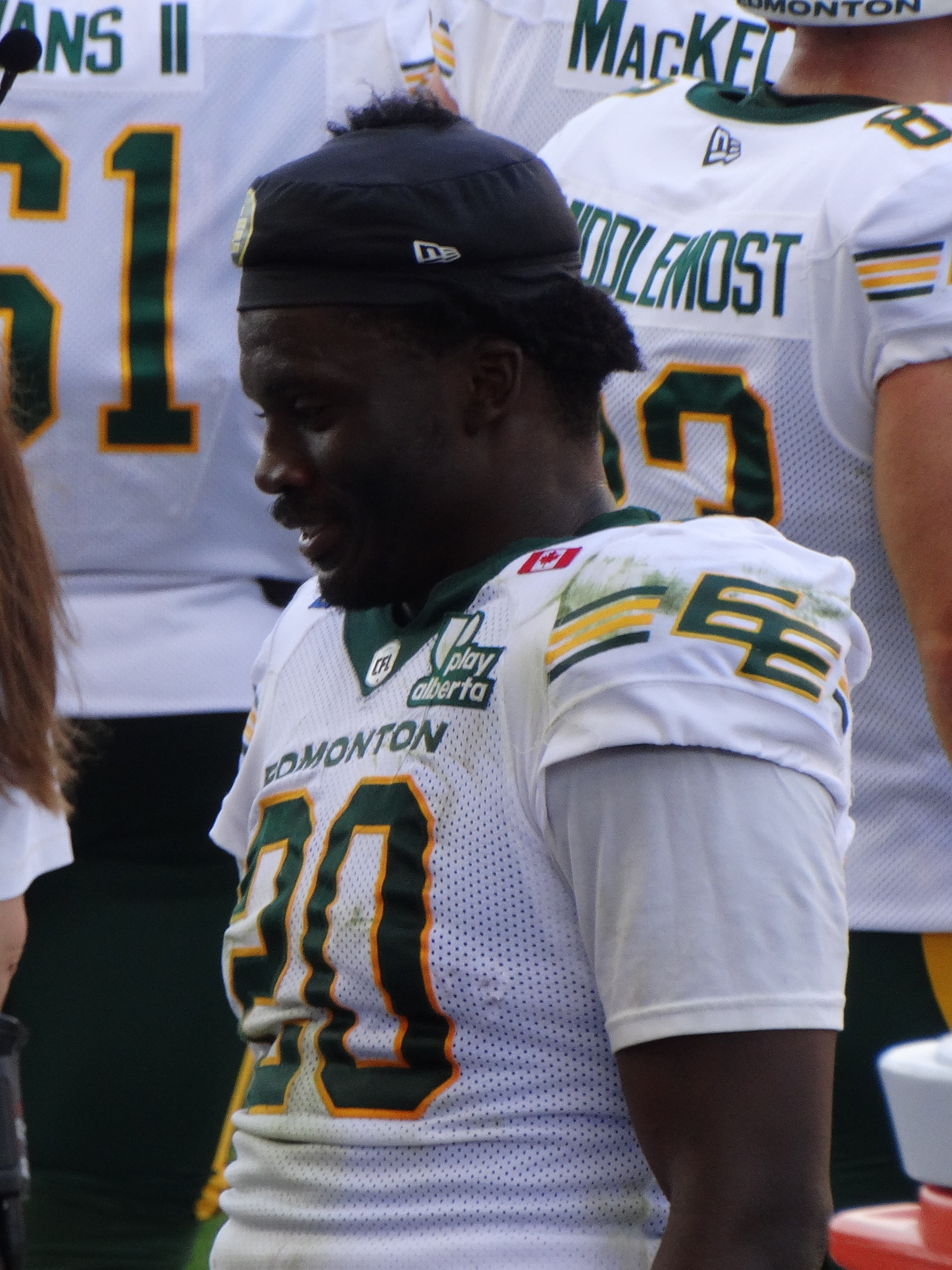
- Logan with the Edmonton Elks in 2025

No. 20 – Edmonton Elks
- Position: Safety
- Roster status: Active
- CFL status: American

Personal information
- Born: October 25, 2000 (age 26); St. Augustine, Florida, U.S.
- Listed height: 6 ft 0 in (1.83 m)
- Listed weight: 210 lb (95 kg)

Career information
- High school: Menendez (St. Augustine)
- College: Kansas (2019–2023)
- NFL draft: 2024: undrafted

Career history
- Los Angeles Rams (2024)*; Edmonton Elks (2025–present)
- * Offseason or practice squad member only

Awards and highlights
- Grey Cup champion (2026); 2× Second-team All-Big 12 (2021, 2023)
- Stats at Pro Football Reference

Kenny Logan Jr. (born October 25, 2000) is an American professional football safety for the Edmonton Elks of the Canadian Football League (CFL). He was signed by the Los Angeles Rams of the National Football League (NFL) as an undrafted free agent following the 2024 NFL draft. He played college football for the Kansas Jayhawks where he majored in sports management while starting as a safety for the football team.

== Early life ==
Logan grew up in St. Augustine, Florida where he attended high school at Menendez. In Logan's high school career, he rushed for 2,284 yards and 30 touchdowns on 330 carries, while also hauling in 63 receptions for 1,075 yards and eight touchdowns. On defense Logan recorded 157 tackles with two being for a loss, eight interceptions, and a fumble recovery. Logan committed to play college football for the Kansas Jayhawks.

== College career ==
In Logan's first season in 2019, he finished the year with 14 tackles, as well as returning nine kickoffs for 150 yards, and five punts for 28 yards. In week eight of the 2020 season, Logan had a breakout game recording his first career interception and returning a kick 100 yards for a touchdown, but the Jayhawks lost 52–22 to Iowa State. Logan finished the 2020 season, which was shortened due to the COVID-19 pandemic, with 58 tackles with one for a loss, a sack, three pass deflections, two interceptions, and a forced fumble. Logan also returned 13 kickoffs for 345 yards and a touchdown. For his performance on the year, Logan was named a Big 12 honorable mention at kick returner. In week twelve of the 2021 season, Logan recorded a career high 15 tackles in a loss to TCU. Logan finished the 2021 season as the Big 12's leading tackler with 111 tackles with four being for a loss, six pass deflections, an interception, a fumble recovery, and two forced fumbles. Logan also returned 15 kickoffs for 419 yards. For his performance on the year, Logan was named second-team All Big-12 as a safety. In the 2022 season, Logan had 106 tackles with one and half tackles for a loss, five pass deflections, two interceptions, a fumble recovery, and a forced fumble. In addition, Logan returned 12 kickoffs for 237 yards. For his performance on the year, Logan was named an honorable mention all Big-12 selection at safety. Logan announced that he would return to Kansas for the 2023 season to play his final season of eligibility.

== Professional career ==
Pre-draft measurables
Height	Weight	Arm length	Hand span	Wingspan	40-yard dash	10-yard split	20-yard split	20-yard shuttle	Three-cone drill	Vertical jump	Broad jump	Bench press
5 ft 10 7/8 in (1.80 m)	209 lb (95 kg)	31 3/4 in (0.81 m)	9 5/8 in (0.24 m)	6 ft 3 3/4 in (1.92 m)	4.69 s	1.70 s	2.75 s	4.53 s	7.14 s	33.0 in (0.84 m)	9 ft 8 in (2.95 m)	13 reps
All values from Pro Day

=== Los Angeles Rams ===
Logan signed with the Los Angeles Rams as an undrafted free agent on May 2, 2024. He was waived by the Rams on August 6.

=== Edmonton Elks ===
Logan was signed by the Edmonton Elks on December 23, 2024.

== Personal life ==
Logan, is the brother of former All-American kick returner Brandon James.
