= Jaylan Ford =

American football player (born 2001)

No. 53 – New Orleans Saints
- Position: Linebacker
- Roster status: Active

Personal information
- Born: November 28, 2001 (age 24); Frisco, Texas, U.S.
- Listed height: 6 ft 2 in (1.88 m)
- Listed weight: 240 lb (109 kg)

Career information
- High school: Lone Star (Frisco, Texas)
- College: Texas (2020–2023)
- NFL draft: 2024: 5th round, 175th overall pick

Career history
- New Orleans Saints (2024–present)

Awards and highlights
- Third-team All-American (2022); 2× First-team All-Big 12 (2022, 2023)

Career NFL statistics as of Week 7, 2026
- Total tackles: 17
- Stats at Pro Football Reference

Jaylan Ford (born November 28, 2001) is an American professional football linebacker for the New Orleans Saints of the National Football League (NFL). He played college football for the Texas Longhorns.

== Early life ==
Ford attended Lone Star High School in Frisco, Texas, where he was the District 5-5A-I Defensive MVP as a junior. A three star prospect, Ford originally committed to play college football for Utah before flipping his commitment to Texas.

== College career ==
After being a role player his first two seasons at the University of Texas at Austin, Ford emerged as a key contributor for the Longhorns in 2022. On October 15, 2022, Ford recorded 8 tackles and two forced turnovers in a 24–21 win over Iowa State and was named the Big 12 defensive player of the week. Ford finished the season with 119 tackles, the second most of any player in the Big 12. At the conclusion of the season he was named a member of the All Big-12 first team, and third-team All-American by the Associated Press. Ford would return for his senior season, once again earning All Big-12 first team honors.

== Professional career ==
Pre-draft measurables
Height	Weight	Arm length	Hand span	Wingspan	40-yard dash	10-yard split	20-yard split	20-yard shuttle	Three-cone drill	Vertical jump	Broad jump	Bench press
6 ft 2 3/8 in (1.89 m)	240 lb (109 kg)	31 3/4 in (0.81 m)	9 1/2 in (0.24 m)	6 ft 2 3/8 in (1.89 m)	4.72 s	1.66 s	2.65 s	4.24 s	7.09 s	33.5 in (0.85 m)	10 ft 6 in (3.20 m)	18 reps
All values from NFL Combine/Pro Day

Ford was selected by the New Orleans Saints in the fifth round (175th overall) of the 2024 NFL draft. He played in 8 games during his rookie campaign, recording 4 combined tackles. In Week 17 against the Las Vegas Raiders, Ford suffered a fractured fibula, necessitating surgery and effectively ending his season.

On August 30, 2026, Ford was placed on injured reserve with a designation to return. He was activated on October 10.

== Career statistics ==
=== NFL ===
Legend
**Bold**	Career high

==== Regular season ====
Year	Team	Games		Tackles				Fumbles				Interceptions				
Year	Team	GP	GS	Cmb	Solo	Ast	Sck	FF	FR	Yds	TD	Int	Yds	Lng	TD	PD
2024	NO	8	0	4	2	2	0.0	0	0	0	0	0	0	0	0	0
2025	NO	17	0	**11**	**7**	**8**	0.0	0	0	0	0	0	0	0	0	0
Career		25	0	15	9	10	0.0	0	0	0	0	0	0	0	0	0

=== College ===
Year	Team	GP	Tackles					Interceptions					Fumbles			
Year	Team	GP	Solo	Ast	Cmb	TfL	Sck	Int	Yds	Avg	TD	PD	FR	Yds	TD	FF
2020	Texas	10	5	9	14	1	0.0	0	0	0.0	0	0	0	0	0	0
2021	Texas	12	29	24	53	6	0.0	0	0	0.0	0	0	0	0	0	0
2022	Texas	13	**61**	**58**	**119**	10	**2.0**	**4**	**48**	**12.0**	0	**2**	**2**	0	0	**3**
2023	Texas	**14**	47	54	101	**11**	1.0	2	5	2.5	0	**2**	1	0	0	1
Career		49	142	145	287	28	3.0	6	53	8.8	0	4	3	0	0	4
