= Nelson Ceaser =

American football player (born 2001)

Profile
- Position: Defensive end

Personal information
- Born: June 3, 2001 (age 25); Missouri City, Texas, U.S.
- Listed height: 6 ft 3 in (1.91 m)
- Listed weight: 253 lb (115 kg)

Career information
- High school: Ridge Point (Sienna, Texas)
- College: Houston (2019–2023)
- NFL draft: 2024: undrafted

Career history
- Seattle Seahawks (2024)*; DC Defenders (2025)*; San Antonio Brahmas (2025); Buffalo Bills (2025)*; Columbus Aviators (2026)*
- * Offseason or practice squad member only

Awards and highlights
- First-team All-Big 12 (2023)
- Stats at Pro Football Reference

Nelson Ceaser (born June 3, 2001) is an American professional football defensive end. He played college football at Houston.

== Early life ==
Ceaser attended high school at Ridge Point. Coming out of high school, Ceaser was rated as a four-star recruit and held offers from schools such as Nebraska, Houston, Oklahoma, TCU, Texas Tech, and Arizona. Ceaser ultimately decided to commit to play college football for the Houston Cougars.

== College career ==
In Ceaser's first two seasons in 2019 and 2020, he notched just two tackles with one and a half being for a loss, one and a half sacks, and a forced fumble, in two games. In the 2021 Birmingham Bowl, Ceaser notched five tackles, as he helped the Cougars beat Auburn. Ceaser finished the 2021 season with 22 tackles with four being for a loss, and three and a half sacks. During the 2022 season in a game versus Rice, Ceaser recovered a fumble and returned it 11 yards for a touchdown to seal a win. In 2022, Ceaser tallied 36 tackles with ten going for a loss, four sacks, two pass deflections, an interception, a fumble recovery, a forced fumble, and a touchdown. Ceaaser would have a breakout 2023 season, totaling 43 tackles with 13.5 being for a loss, nine and a half sacks, and a pass deflection. For his performance on the season, Ceaser was named first-team all Big-12. After the conclusion of the 2023 season, Ceaser would declare for the 2024 NFL draft.

== Professional career ==
Pre-draft measurables
Height	Weight	Arm length	Hand span	Wingspan	40-yard dash	10-yard split	20-yard split	20-yard shuttle	Three-cone drill	Vertical jump	Bench press
6 ft 2 3/4 in (1.90 m)	254 lb (115 kg)	33 5/8 in (0.85 m)	10 1/4 in (0.26 m)	6 ft 7 5/8 in (2.02 m)	4.91 s	1.76 s	2.88 s	4.57 s	7.30 s	31.0 in (0.79 m)	22 reps
All values from NFL Combine/Pro Day

=== Seattle Seahawks ===
Ceaser signed with the Seattle Seahawks as an undrafted free agent on May 3, 2024. He was waived on August 27.

=== DC Defenders ===
On December 6, 2024, Ceaser signed with the DC Defenders of the United Football League (UFL).

=== San Antonio Brahmas ===
On April 16, 2025, Ceaser signed with the San Antonio Brahmas of the United Football League (UFL).

=== Buffalo Bills ===
On August 14, 2025, Ceaser signed with the Buffalo Bills. Ceaser was released by the Bills on August 24.

=== Columbus Aviators ===
On January 13, 2026, Ceaser was selected by the Columbus Aviators in the 2026 UFL Draft. He was released on February 20.
