= Jason Johnson (linebacker) =

American football player (born 2001)

Profile
- Position: Linebacker

Personal information
- Born: June 1, 2001 (age 25); Chicago, Illinois, U.S.
- Listed height: 6 ft 2 in (1.88 m)
- Listed weight: 235 lb (107 kg)

Career information
- High school: Rich Central (Olympia Fields, Illinois)
- College: Eastern Illinois (2019–2021); UCF (2022–2023)
- NFL draft: 2024: undrafted

Career history
- Dallas Cowboys (2024)

Awards and highlights
- First-team All American (2019, 2020, 2021); AAC Scholar Athlete of the Year (2023); UCF Scholar Athlete of the Year (2023); Second-team All-Big 12 (2023); First-team All-AAC (2022); First-team All-OVC (2020, 2021); Hula Bowl Defensive MVP (2024)

Jason Johnson Jr. (born June 1, 2001) is an American professional football linebacker. He played college football at Eastern Illinois and UCF where he was a multiple time All American/All Conference Linebacker. Johnson also had a stint with the Dallas Cowboys.

== Early life ==
Johnson attended high school at Rich Central.His senior year Johnson totaled 105 tackles, 5 forced fumbles, 1 interception, 843 receiving yards, 5 touchdowns, and was the conference’s Defensive Player of the Year. Coming out of high school, Johnson decided to commit to play college football for the Eastern Illinois Panthers.

== College career ==
=== Eastern Illinois ===
Johnson was a 3 Time All American and 2 time All Conference Linebacker at Eastern Illinois.In the 2020 and 2021 seasons Johnson lead the Ohio Valley Conference in tackles. . Johnson finished his career at Eastern Illinois with 235 tackles and two and a half sacks.

=== UCF ===
Johnson decided to transfer to play for the UCF Knights to continue his collegiate football career. At UCF he was a 1st Team All AAC selection, and a 2nd team All Big 12 selection.

He finished his career with 478 tackles, 265 Solo Tackles, 30 TFLs, 7 Sacks, and 13 FFs/FRs. Johnson earned AAC Scholar Athlete of the year, UCF Scholar Athlete of the Year, and was the Hula Bowl Defensive MVP. Johnson had three consecutive seasons with 100+ tackles and led his team is tackles 4 out of 5 years. He made UCF history finishing 7th on the single season tackle list.

In week two of the 2022 season, Johnson tallied 12 tackles in a 20-14 loss versus Louisville. Johnson finished the 2022 season with 126 tackles with four being for a loss, one sack, two fumble recoveries, and two forced fumbles. For his performance in the 2022 season, Johnson earned first-team all-American honors. Johnson decided to return to UCF for the 2023 season as a fifth-year senior. In week 12 of the 2023 season, Johnson notched six tackles, a sack, and he deflected a pass that was intercepted, as he helped UCF dominate Oklahoma State 45-3. In Johnson's final season in 2023 he tallied 114 tackles with six and a half going for a loss, three sacks, two pass deflections, and a fumble recovery. Johnson was invited to play in the 2024 Hula Bowl, in which he was named the game's Defensive MVP.

== Professional career ==
Pre-draft measurables
Height	Weight	Arm length	Hand span	40-yard dash	10-yard split	20-yard split	20-yard shuttle	Three-cone drill	Vertical jump	Broad jump	Bench press
6 ft 2 in (1.88 m)	235 lb (107 kg)	31 1/8 in (0.79 m)	8 3/4 in (0.22 m)	4.56 s	1.62 s	2.67 s	4.33 s	7.10 s	32 in (0.81 m)	9 ft 9 in (2.97 m)	20 reps
All values from Pro Day

=== Dallas Cowboys ===
Johnson signed with the Dallas Cowboys as an undrafted free agent on May 8, 2024. Johnson stood out as an undrafted rookie with limited playing time when he had the first sack of the Cowboys preseason game, and the first interception in training camp. He was waived on August 26.
