= Lokahi Pauole =

American football player (born 2001)

No. 77
- Position: Guard/Center/Tackle

Personal information
- Born: February 7, 2001 (age 25)
- Listed height: 6 ft 4 in (1.93 m)
- Listed weight: 305 lb (138 kg)

Career information
- High school: Kamehameha (Honolulu, Hawaii)
- College: UCF (2019–2023)

Awards and highlights
- First-team All-AAC (2022); Second-team All-AAC (2021); Honorable Mention All-Big 12 (2023); Honorable Mention All-AAC (2020)
- Stats at ESPN

Lokahi Pauole (born February 7, 2001) is an American former college football offensive lineman for the UCF Knights.

== Early life ==
Pauole grew up in Kapolei, Hawaii and attended Kamehameha Schools, where he played football and basketball. Pauole excelled in football and was chosen to play in the 2019 Polynesian Bowl All-Star Game as a senior. He was also named to the First-Team Interscholastic League of Honolulu All-Star Selection. According to Rivals.com, he was the No. 9 player in the State of Hawaii. The nation's No. 179 offensive tackle according to 247Sports. A three-star prospect, Pauole committed to play college football at University of Central Florida, to join the Hawaii pipeline with McKenzie Milton and Dillon Gabriel.

== College career ==
Pauole made his collegiate debut against Florida A&M, appearing in eight games as a freshman at guard and tackle. In his sophomore season, coach Glen Elarbee elevated him to the starting lineup. He started all ten games, eight times at offensive guard, earning all-conference team honors. Pauole remained at UCF despite coach Josh Heupel and his staff moving onto coach at Tennessee.

Coach Gus Malzahn took the job at UCF and brought his staff which included the well respected offensive line coach Herb Hand. Pauole referred to it like "starting over" having to earn his starting role again. Pauole references getting challenged to losing weight and getting more athletic. Pauole started at offensive guard in all 13 games. He earned second-team conference honors, second-team All-AAC recognition from Phil Steele, as well as third-team All-AAC recognition from Pro Football Focus. In 2022 he started all 14 games at offensive guard, first-team All-AAC selection in 2022, Pro Football Network, Athlon Sports, Lindy's Sports, and Phil Steele. He was on ’22 watch list for Outland Trophy and Polynesian Football Player of the Year Award. In 2022, UCF led the nation as top 10 rushing offense, UCF's o-line led the nation as a percentage of least blown block assignments.

Pauole made the decision to remain at UCF before the 2023 season, citing his loyalty to his teammates and the program. Pauole was named a team captain heading into their inaugural season in the Big 12 Conference. Pauole was named on the preseason watchlist for the Polynesian Player of the Year Award and Outland Trophy. Due to injuries sustained on the o-line, Lokahi played multiple o-line positions throughout his senior year, closing the season as an emergency center. In 2023, he was named to the conference's Big 12 Honorable Mention team, USA Today All-Big 12 team, and Phil Steele All-Big 12 second team.
