= Dadrion Taylor-Demerson =

American football player (born 2001)

No. 42 – Arizona Cardinals
- Position: Strong safety
- Roster status: Active

Personal information
- Born: January 20, 2001 (age 25); Oklahoma City, Oklahoma, U.S.
- Listed height: 5 ft 10 in (1.78 m)
- Listed weight: 200 lb (91 kg)

Career information
- High school: Carl Albert (Midwest City, Oklahoma)
- College: Texas Tech (2019–2023)
- NFL draft: 2024: 4th round, 104th overall pick

Career history
- Arizona Cardinals (2024–present)

Awards and highlights
- Second-team All-Big 12 (2023)

Career NFL statistics as of Week 5, 2026
- Tackles: 102
- Interceptions: 2
- Pass deflections: 11
- Forced fumbles: 1
- Stats at Pro Football Reference

Dadrion Taylor-Demerson (born January 20, 2001) is an American professional football strong safety for the Arizona Cardinals of the National Football League (NFL). He played college football for the Texas Tech Red Raiders and was selected by the Cardinals in the fourth round of the 2024 NFL draft.

== Early life ==
Taylor-Demerson attended Carl Albert High School in Midwest City, Oklahoma. He played running back in high school. As a senior, he was named the Oklahoma 5A Player of the Year after rushing for 1,365 yards and 24 touchdowns. For his career, he had 4,611 rushing yards. He committed to Texas Tech University.

== College career ==
Taylor-Demerson played at Texas Tech from 2019 to 2023. During his career he appeared in 58 games and had 238 tackles, 10 interceptions and two sacks. After the 2023 season, he declared for the 2024 NFL draft.

== Professional career ==
Pre-draft measurables
Height	Weight	Arm length	Hand span	Wingspan	40-yard dash	10-yard split	20-yard split	20-yard shuttle	Three-cone drill	Vertical jump	Broad jump	Bench press
5 ft 10 3/8 in (1.79 m)	197 lb (89 kg)	30 7/8 in (0.78 m)	9 5/8 in (0.24 m)	6 ft 2 1/4 in (1.89 m)	4.41 s	1.52 s	2.56 s	4.39 s	7.00 s	38.0 in (0.97 m)	10 ft 3 in (3.12 m)	18 reps
All values from NFL Combine/Pro Day

Taylor-Demerson was selected by the Arizona Cardinals with the 104th overall pick in the fourth round of the 2024 NFL draft. He recorded his first NFL interception against Mac Jones of the San Francisco 49ers in the Cardinals week 3 loss.

== NFL career statistics ==
=== Regular season ===
Year	Team	Games		Tackles					Interceptions						Fumbles				
Year	Team	GP	GS	Cmb	Solo	Ast	Sck	TFL	Int	Yds	Avg	Lng	TD	PD	FF	Fmb	FR	Yds	TD
2024	ARI	17	2	37	23	14	0.0	3	0	0	0.0	0	0	5	1	0	0	0	0
2025	ARI	12	4	59	32	27	0.0	0	2	18	9.0	18	0	6	0	1	0	0	0
2026	ARI	2	0	6	4	2	0.0	0	0	0	0.0	0	0	0	0	0	0	0	0
Career		31	6	102	59	43	0.0	3	2	18	9.0	18	0	11	1	1	0	0	0
