= Brandon Coleman (offensive lineman) =

American football player (born 2000)

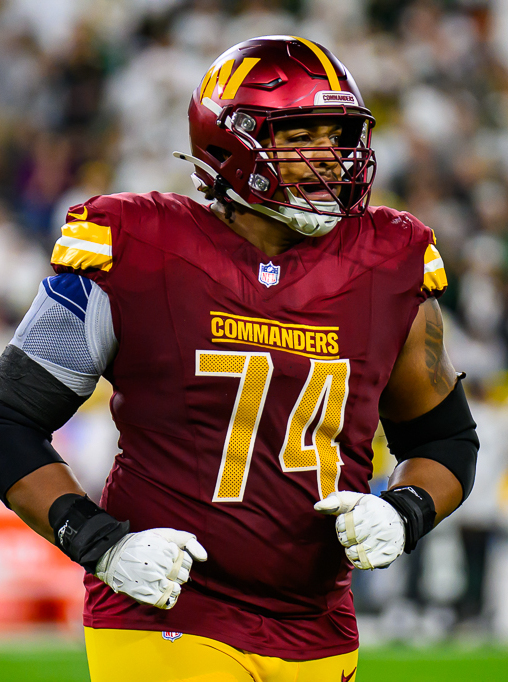
- Coleman with the Washington Commanders in 2025

No. 74 – Washington Commanders
- Position: Offensive tackle
- Roster status: Active

Personal information
- Born: October 12, 2000 (age 26); Newport News, Virginia, U.S.
- Listed height: 6 ft 6 in (1.98 m)
- Listed weight: 320 lb (145 kg)

Career information
- High school: Denton (Denton, Texas)
- College: Trinity Valley (2019); TCU (2020–2023)
- NFL draft: 2024: 3rd round, 67th overall pick

Career history
- Washington Commanders (2024–present)

Awards and highlights
- Second-team All-Big 12 (2023)

Career NFL statistics as of Week 4, 2026
- Games played: 32
- Games started: 21
- Receptions: 1
- Receiving yards: 13
- Stats at Pro Football Reference

Brandon Coleman (born October 12, 2000) is an American professional football offensive tackle for the Washington Commanders of the National Football League (NFL). He grew up in Berlin, Germany, moving back to the U.S. for high school prior to playing college football for the Trinity Valley Cardinals and TCU Horned Frogs. Coleman was selected by the Commanders in the third round of the 2024 NFL draft.

== Early life ==
Coleman was born on October 12, 2000, in Newport News, Virginia, to an American military serviceman and a German woman. He spent his childhood in Berlin, Germany, before returning to the United States in 2016 and enrolling at Denton High School in Denton, Texas. He played basketball as a guard in Germany and first played American football in high school as a defensive lineman before playing on the offensive line as a senior.

== College career ==
Coleman began his college football career with the Cardinals of Trinity Valley Community College, appearing in seven games as a freshman in 2019. He was ranked a three-star junior college recruit and the eighth offensive tackle nationally by 247Sports, committing to play for the TCU Horned Frogs in 2020.

Coleman played in the first four games of the 2020 season at TCU before his year ended due to injury. He became a starter in 2021, finishing the season with 11 games played, eight as a starter. He started all 15 games in 2022 and helped the team have one of the best offenses nationally while reaching the national championship, being named honorable mention All-Big 12 Conference. Entering the 2023 season, Coleman's athletic ability was cited on The Athletic's annual "Freaks" list. He was selected team captain and started 11 games, being named second-team All-Big 12 and an honorable mention for conference lineman of the year while allowing only one sack. He played in the 2024 Senior Bowl.

== Professional career ==
Pre-draft measurables
Height	Weight	Arm length	Hand span	Wingspan	40-yard dash	10-yard split	20-yard split	20-yard shuttle	Three-cone drill	Vertical jump	Broad jump	Bench press
6 ft 4 1/2 in (1.94 m)	313 lb (142 kg)	34 5/8 in (0.88 m)	10 3/4 in (0.27 m)	7 ft 0 in (2.13 m)	4.99 s	1.73 s	2.89 s	4.62 s	7.40 s	34.0 in (0.86 m)	9 ft 6 in (2.90 m)	24 reps
All values from NFL Combine/Pro Day

Coleman was selected by the Washington Commanders in the third round (67th overall) of the 2024 NFL draft. He signed his four-year rookie contract on June 14, 2024. As a rookie, he appeared in 16 games and started 12 at left tackle. Coleman moved to left guard in 2025 following the team's acquisition of offensive tackles Laremy Tunsil and Josh Conerly Jr. After starting the first two games of the 2025 season, Coleman was removed as the starting left guard in Week 3 in favor of Chris Paul. The Commanders designated him as a healthy inactive for five consecutive games. In Week 8, Coleman stepped in at left tackle after Tunsil left the game in the first quarter with a hamstring injury. In the last three games of the 2025 season, he started at left tackle due to Tunsil being injured. Following Tunsil tearing his triceps, the Commanders moved Colmean back to left tackle during training camp and named him the starter before the start of the 2026 season.

== Personal life ==
Coleman is fluent in the German language.
