= Khalid Duke =

American football player (born 2001)

Profile
- Position: Linebacker

Personal information
- Born: February 27, 2001 (age 25); Atlanta, Georgia, U.S.
- Listed height: 6 ft 3 in (1.91 m)
- Listed weight: 246 lb (112 kg)

Career information
- High school: Riverside Military (Gainesville, Georgia)
- College: Kansas State (2019–2023)
- NFL draft: 2024: undrafted

Career history
- Tennessee Titans (2024)

Awards and highlights
- Second-team All-Big 12 (2023)

Career NFL statistics as of 2024
- Total tackles: 1
- Stats at Pro Football Reference

Khalid Duke (born February 27, 2001) is an American professional football linebacker. He played college football for the Kansas State Wildcats.

== Early life ==
Duke attended high school at Riverside Military Academy. Coming out of high school, Duke was rated as a three star recruit where he decided to commit to play college football for the Kansas State Wildcats.

== College career ==
In Duke's freshman season in 2019, he recorded seven tackles with three being for a loss, two sacks, a pass deflections and a fumble recovery. During the COVID shortend 2020 season, Duke notched 26 tackles with three of them going for a loss, and a sack. During the 2021 season, Duke played in two games where he had six tackles with two being for a loss, and two sacks, before going down with a season ending injury in week two. In week five of the 2022 season, Duke tallied three sacks versus Texas Tech. During the 2022 season, Duke had a breakout season posting 44 tackles with five being for a loss, three sacks, and a pass deflection. In the 2023 season, Duke posted 19 tackles with eight being for a loss, six sacks, and a forced fumble. After the conclusion of the 2023 season, Duke decided to declare for the 2024 NFL draft.

== Professional career ==
Pre-draft measurables
Height	Weight	Arm length	Hand span	Wingspan	40-yard dash	10-yard split	20-yard split	20-yard shuttle	Three-cone drill	Vertical jump	Broad jump	Bench press
6 ft 3 1/4 in (1.91 m)	246 lb (112 kg)	32 5/8 in (0.83 m)	9 1/4 in (0.23 m)	6 ft 6 3/8 in (1.99 m)	4.79 s	1.62 s	2.80 s	4.60 s	7.41 s	34.0 in (0.86 m)	9 ft 9 in (2.97 m)	21 reps
All values from NFL Combine/Pro Day

Duke signed with the Tennessee Titans as an undrafted free agent on May 10, 2024. He was waived on August 27, and re-signed to the practice squad. He was signed to the active roster on January 4, 2025. He played in two games during the 2024 season, making his NFL debut on Week 16 against the Indianapolis Colts as a special teams contributor, and later recording one tackle and a quarterback hit in the season closer against the Houston Texans. On April 18, Duke was released by the Titans.
