= Kobe Savage =

American football player (born 2001)

Profile
- Position: Safety

Personal information
- Born: February 12, 2001 (age 25); Paris, Texas, U.S.
- Listed height: 5 ft 11 in (1.80 m)
- Listed weight: 207 lb (94 kg)

Career information
- High school: Paris (Paris, Texas)
- College: Texas A&M–Commerce (2019); Tyler JC (2020–2021); Kansas State (2022–2023); Oregon (2024)
- NFL draft: 2025: undrafted

Career history
- Ottawa Redblacks (2026)*
- * Offseason or practice squad member only

Awards and highlights
- 2x Second-team All-Big 12 (2022, 2023)
- Stats at ESPN

Kobe Savage (born February 12, 2001) is an American college football safety. He previously played for the Texas A&M–Commerce Lions, the Tyler Apaches and the Kansas State Wildcats.

== Early life ==
Savage attended Paris High School in Paris, Texas, where he initially played quarterback before switching to safety as a senior. He committed to play college football for the Texas A&M–Commerce Lions.

== College career ==
=== Texas A&M–Commerce ===
Savage took a redshirt in his lone season at Texas A&M-Commerce in 2019.

=== Tyler JC ===
Savage transfer to play at Tyler Junior College, where he totaled 100 tackles, four pass deflections, and six interceptions in two seasons.

=== Kansas State ===
After two season at Tyler College, Savage committed to play Division I football for the Kansas State Wildcats for the 2022 season. In his first season with the Wildcats he tallied 58 tackles, three interceptions, and a forced fumble, in ten starts before missing the final four games due to an ACL tear. For his performance in the 2022 season, Savage was named the Big 12 Conference defensive newcomer of the year and earned second-team all-Big 12 honors. In 2023, he notched 57 tackles with three being for a loss, and three interceptions, while once again being named second-team all Big-12. After the season, Savage entered his name into the NCAA transfer portal.

=== Oregon ===
Savage transferred to play for the Oregon Ducks.

== Professional career ==
In 2025, Savage participated in rookie camp for the San Francisco 49ers but ultimately did not sign with the team.

=== Ottowa Redblacks ===
On April 16, 2026, Savage signed with the Ottawa Redblacks of the Canadian Football League (CFL). He was released on May 13.
