= Ethan Downs =

American football player (born 2002)

No. 40 – Kansas City Chiefs
- Position: Defensive end
- Roster status: Injured reserve

Personal information
- Born: October 13, 2002 (age 24); Weatherford, Oklahoma, U.S.
- Listed height: 6 ft 4 in (1.93 m)
- Listed weight: 263 lb (119 kg)

Career information
- High school: Weatherford (OK)
- College: Oklahoma (2021–2024)
- NFL draft: 2025: undrafted

Career history
- Jacksonville Jaguars (2025)*; Kansas City Chiefs (2025–present)
- * Offseason or practice squad member only

Awards and highlights
- 2× Second-team All-Big 12 (2022, 2023)

Career NFL statistics as of 2025
- Tackles: 5
- Forced fumbles: 1
- Stats at Pro Football Reference

Ethan Downs (born October 13, 2002) is an American professional football defensive end for the Kansas City Chiefs of the National Football League (NFL). He played college football for the Oklahoma Sooners.

== Early life ==
Downs attended Weatherford High School in Weatherford, Oklahoma, where he played as a running back and defensive end. On offense he rushed for 1,194 yards and 15 touchdowns while also hauling in 56 receptions for 982 yards and 14 touchdowns. On defense he tallied 203 tackles with 38 being for a loss, 16 sacks, two pass deflections, two interceptions, two forced fumbles, and two fumble recoveries. Downs committed to play college football at the University of Oklahoma.

== College career ==
Downs made his college debut in week 2 of the 2021 season, recording one tackle for loss and one forced fumble in 24 snaps played as the Sooners beat Western Carolina 76–0. He finished the season with 14 tackles and three of them going for a loss, 0.5 sacks, and a forced fumble. In week 3 of the 2022 season, Downs recorded a tackle for a loss and a sack in a win over Nebraska. In week 11, he tallied three tackles for a loss and a sack in a loss to West Virginia. In the season finale, Downs racked up 2.5 tackles for loss and a fumble recovery in a loss to Texas Tech. He finished the 2022 season with 38 tackles with 13.5 going for a loss, 4.5 sacks, three pass deflections, and a fumble recovery, earning second-team all-Big 12 Conference honors. Downs was named preseason first-team all-Big 12 ahead of the 2023 season.

== Professional career ==
Pre-draft measurables
Height	Weight	Arm length	Hand span	Wingspan	40-yard dash	10-yard split	20-yard split	20-yard shuttle	Three-cone drill	Vertical jump	Broad jump	Bench press
6 ft 3 3/4 in (1.92 m)	269 lb (122 kg)	31 in (0.79 m)	10 1/2 in (0.27 m)	6 ft 5 in (1.96 m)	4.69 s	1.62 s	2.72 s	4.59 s	7.58 s	34.0 in (0.86 m)	9 ft 11 in (3.02 m)	32 reps
All values from NFL Combine

=== Jacksonville Jaguars ===
On April 27, 2025, Downs signed with the Jacksonville Jaguars as an undrafted free agent. He was waived by Jacksonville on August 26 as part of final roster cuts.

=== Kansas City Chiefs ===
On August 27, 2025, Downs signed with the Kansas City Chiefs' practice squad. He was promoted to the active roster on December 24.

On July 28, 2026, Downs tore his ACL in practice and was placed on injured reserve, ending his 2026 season.

== Personal life ==
Downs is a tribal citizen of the Osage Nation.
