= Jared Wiley =

American football player (born 2000)

No. 89 – Kansas City Chiefs
- Position: Tight end
- Roster status: Injured reserve

Personal information
- Born: November 2, 2000 (age 26); Temple, Texas, U.S.
- Listed height: 6 ft 6 in (1.98 m)
- Listed weight: 249 lb (113 kg)

Career information
- High school: Temple
- College: Texas (2019–2021); TCU (2022–2023)
- NFL draft: 2024: 4th round, 131st overall pick

Career history
- Kansas City Chiefs (2024–present)

Awards and highlights
- First-team All-Big 12 (2023)

Career NFL statistics as of 2025
- Receptions: 2
- Receiving yards: 11
- Stats at Pro Football Reference

Jared Wiley (born November 2, 2000) is an American professional football tight end for the Kansas City Chiefs of the National Football League (NFL). He played college football for the Texas Longhorns and TCU Horned Frogs and was selected by the Chiefs in the fourth round of the 2024 NFL draft.

== Early life ==
Wiley was born on November 2, 2000, in Temple, Texas. He attended Temple High School, playing tight end and quarterback. He was the team's starting quarterback his senior season and passed for 2,314 yards with 27 touchdowns and five interceptions. He committed to the University of Texas at Austin to play college football.

== College career ==
Wiley played at Texas from 2019 to 2021. In his three years there, he started 12 of 32 games, recording 19 receptions for 248 yards and three touchdowns. After the 2021 season, he transferred to Texas Christian University (TCU). In his first year at TCU in 2022, he had 24 receptions for 245 yards and four touchdowns. He returned in TCU in 2023. Against, Baylor he set a school record for receiving yards in a game by a tight end with 178. For the season, he had 47 receptions for 520 yards and eight touchdowns. He declared for the 2024 NFL draft after the season.

== Professional career ==
Pre-draft measurables
Height	Weight	Arm length	Hand span	Wingspan	40-yard dash	10-yard split	20-yard split	20-yard shuttle	Three-cone drill	Vertical jump	Broad jump
6 ft 6 1/8 in (1.98 m)	249 lb (113 kg)	33 1/4 in (0.84 m)	9 1/2 in (0.24 m)	6 ft 7 1/4 in (2.01 m)	4.62 s	1.62 s	2.65 s	4.52 s	7.19 s	37.0 in (0.94 m)	9 ft 10 in (3.00 m)
All values from NFL Combine/Pro Day

Wiley was selected by the Kansas City Chiefs with the 131st pick in the fourth round of the 2024 NFL draft. Wiley suffered a torn ACL in practice on November 2, 2024, and was placed on injured reserve.
