= Jonah Laulu =

American football player (born 2000)

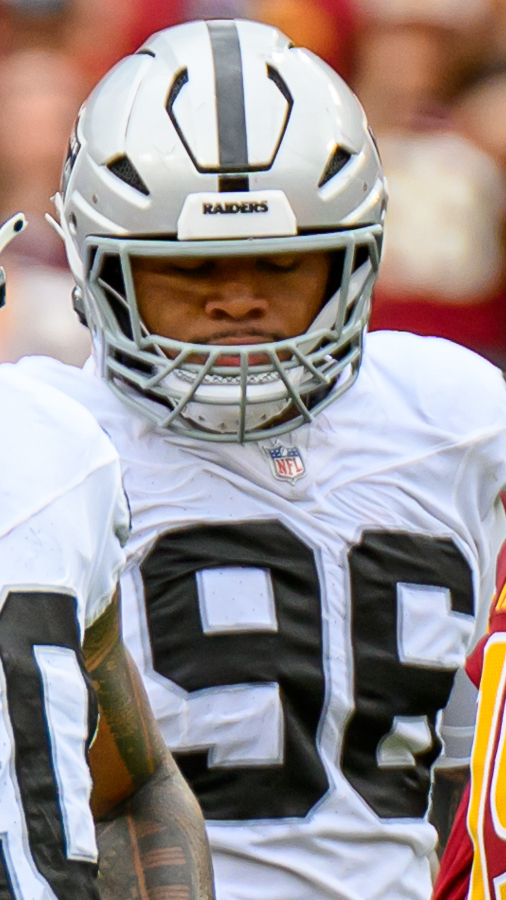
- Laulu in 2025

No. 99 – Tennessee Titans
- Position: Defensive tackle
- Roster status: Active

Personal information
- Born: June 30, 2000 (age 26); Las Vegas, Nevada, U.S.
- Listed height: 6 ft 5 in (1.96 m)
- Listed weight: 289 lb (131 kg)

Career information
- High school: Centennial (Las Vegas)
- College: Hawaii (2018–2021); Oklahoma (2022–2023)
- NFL draft: 2024: 7th round, 234th overall pick

Career history
- Indianapolis Colts (2024)*; Las Vegas Raiders (2024–2026); Tennessee Titans (2026–present)
- * Offseason or practice squad member only

Career NFL statistics as of Week 7, 2026
- Total tackles: 91
- Sacks: 5.5
- Pass deflections: 8
- Stats at Pro Football Reference

Jonah Laulu (born June 30, 2000) is an American professional football defensive tackle for the Tennessee Titans of the National Football League (NFL). He played college football for the Hawaii Rainbow Warriors and the Oklahoma Sooners.

== College career ==
Laulu was a member of Hawaii's scout team in 2018. At the conclusion of the season, he was named the scout team defensive MVP. In 2021, Laulu amassed 34 tackles, eight tackles for loss, and four sacks, before transferring to the University of Oklahoma to play for the Oklahoma Sooners.

In his first season with Oklahoma, Laulu recorded 5.5 tackles for loss, 1.5 sacks, and an interception. Entering the 2023 season, he switched positions, becoming a defensive tackle. In his final collegiate season, Laulu made three starts, totaling 11 tackles, three tackles for loss, and a sack.

== Professional career ==
Pre-draft measurables
Height	Weight	Arm length	Hand span	Wingspan	40-yard dash	10-yard split	20-yard split	20-yard shuttle	Three-cone drill	Vertical jump	Broad jump	Bench press
6 ft 5 1/8 in (1.96 m)	292 lb (132 kg)	33 1/2 in (0.85 m)	9 3/4 in (0.25 m)	6 ft 6 7/8 in (2.00 m)	4.96 s	1.71 s	2.83 s	4.59 s	7.57 s	36.0 in (0.91 m)	9 ft 10 in (3.00 m)	24 reps
All values from Pro Day

=== Indianapolis Colts ===
Laulu was drafted in the seventh round with the 234th overall pick by the Indianapolis Colts in the 2024 NFL draft. He was waived on August 27, 2024.

=== Las Vegas Raiders ===
On August 28, 2024, Laulu was claimed off waivers by the Las Vegas Raiders.

On October 27, 2026, Laulu was waived by the Raiders.

=== Tennessee Titans ===
On October 28, 2026, Laulu was claimed off waivers by the Tennessee Titans.

== NFL career statistics ==
Legend
**Bold**	Career high

=== Regular season ===
Year	Team	Games		Tackles					Interceptions						Fumbles				
Year	Team	GP	GS	Cmb	Solo	Ast	Sck	TFL	Int	Yds	Avg	Lng	TD	PD	FF	Fum	FR	Yds	TD
2024	LV	**17**	7	35	15	20	1.0	3	0	0	0.0	0	0	3	0	0	0	0	0
2025	LV	**17**	**15**	**51**	**24**	**27**	**4.0**	**8**	0	0	0.0	0	0	**5**	0	0	0	0	0
2026	LV	5	0	5	1	4	0.5	0	0	0	0.0	0	0	0	0	0	0	0	0
Career		39	22	91	40	51	5.5	11	0	0	0.0	0	0	8	0	0	0	0	0
