= KT Leveston =

American football player (born 1999)

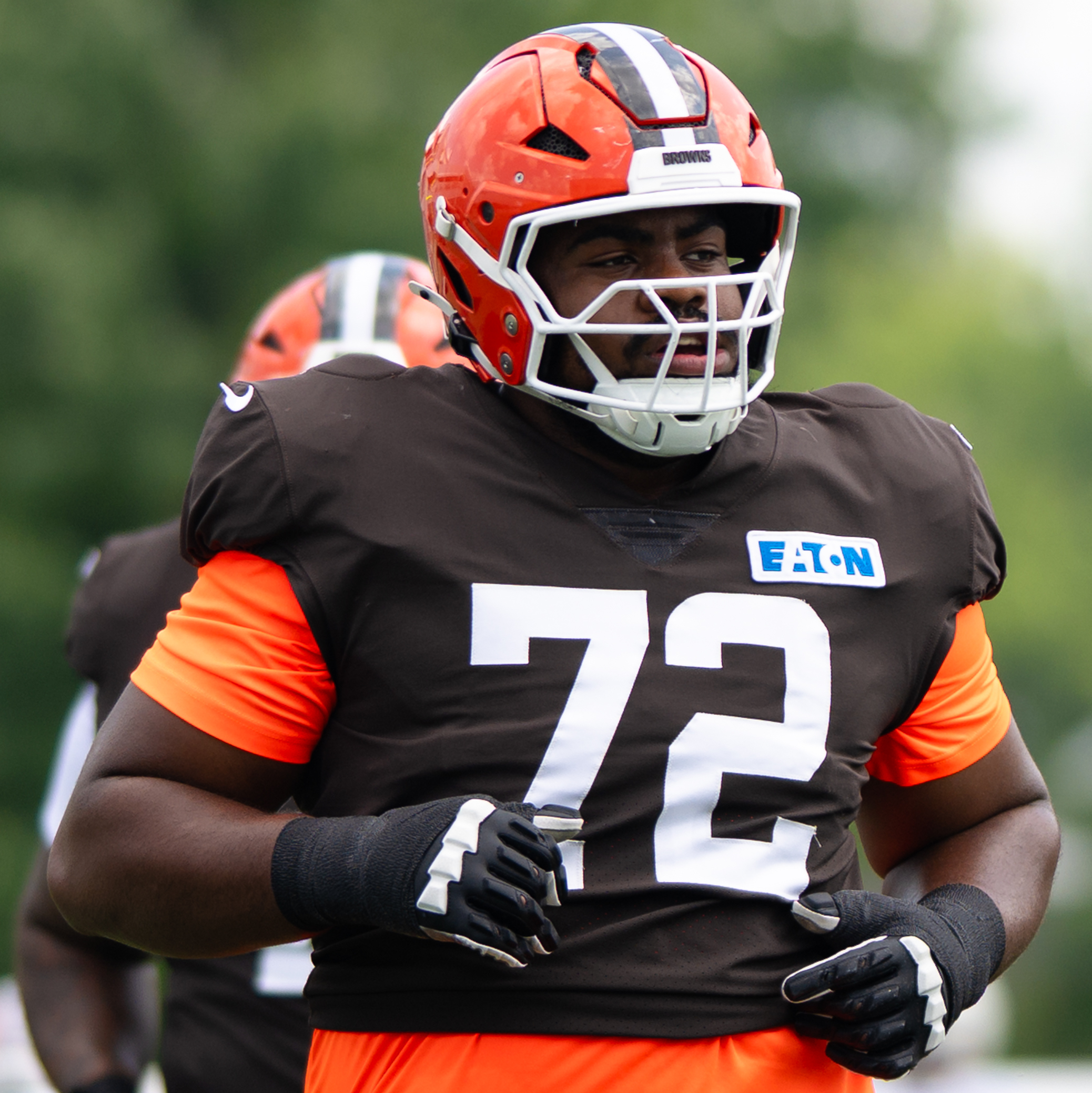
- Leveston with the Cleveland Browns in 2026

No. 72 – Cleveland Browns
- Position: Offensive tackle
- Roster status: Practice squad

Personal information
- Born: October 28, 1999 (age 27); Waco, Texas, U.S.
- Listed height: 6 ft 4 in (1.93 m)
- Listed weight: 335 lb (152 kg)

Career information
- High school: Midway (Waco)
- College: Kansas State (2018–2023)
- NFL draft: 2024: 7th round, 254th overall pick

Career history
- Los Angeles Rams (2024); Cleveland Browns (2025–present)

Career NFL statistics as of 2025
- Games played: 16
- Games started: 7
- Stats at Pro Football Reference

Kaitori "KT" Leveston Jr. (born October 28, 1999) is an American professional football offensive tackle for the Cleveland Browns of the National Football League (NFL). He played college football for the Kansas State Wildcats and was selected by the Los Angeles Rams in the seventh round of the 2024 NFL draft.

== Early life ==
Leveston grew up in Waco, Texas, where he attended Midway High School and played football and basketball. He helped the basketball team win a district championship and played as both an offensive tackle and defensive end in football. He was named a second-team all-district selection at tackle as a junior and then was named first-team all-state and all-district as a senior while helping Midway to a 15–1 record and an appearance in the Class 6A D2 state championship. He committed to play college football for the Kansas State Wildcats as a three-star recruit, being ranked the 96th-best offensive tackle nationally and the 148th-best player overall in the state.

== College career ==
Leveston redshirted as a true freshman at Kansas State in 2018. He played four games as a backup in the 2019 season, then appeared in 10 games, five as a starter, in 2020. After spending the 2021 season as a backup, he won a starting role in 2022 and started 14 games while being named honorable mention All-Big 12 Conference. He graduated with a degree in 2022 but opted to return for a final season in 2023, as all players were granted an extra year of eligibility due to the COVID-19 pandemic. He started 13 games in the 2023 season and was named honorable mention All-Big 12 and to the Waco Tribune-Herald's Super Centex All-College Team. He ended his collegiate career having started 32 of the 50 games he played in. He was invited to the East–West Shrine Bowl and to the NFL Scouting Combine.

== Professional career ==
Pre-draft measurables
| Height | Weight | Arm length | Hand span | Wingspan | 40-yard dash | 10-yard split | 20-yard split | 20-yard shuttle | Three-cone drill | Vertical jump | Broad jump | Bench press |
|---|---|---|---|---|---|---|---|---|---|---|---|---|
| 6 ft 3 7/8 in (1.93 m) | 326 lb (148 kg) | 34 3/8 in (0.87 m) | 9 7/8 in (0.25 m) | 6 ft 9 1/8 in (2.06 m) | 5.38 s | 1.85 s | 3.09 s | 4.85 s | 7.90 s | 27.5 in (0.70 m) | 9 ft 0 in (2.74 m) | 25 reps |
All values from NFL Scouting Combine/Pro Day

=== Los Angeles Rams ===
Leveston was selected by the Los Angeles Rams in the seventh round (254th overall) of the 2024 NFL draft. After being picked, he noted that he considered being picked 254th special because he grew up in Waco, which is located in area code 254. He was placed on injured reserve on August 27, 2024.

=== Cleveland Browns ===
On August 26, 2025, Leveston was traded to the Cleveland Browns in exchange for a 2028 seventh-round pick. After Jack Conklin was placed on injured reserve on December 20, Leveston was named as the team's starting right tackle for the remainder of the year.

On August 30, 2026, Leveston was waived by the Browns as a part of final roster cuts; he was re-signed to the team's practice squad the following day.
