= Jaylon Hutchings =

American football player (born 1999)

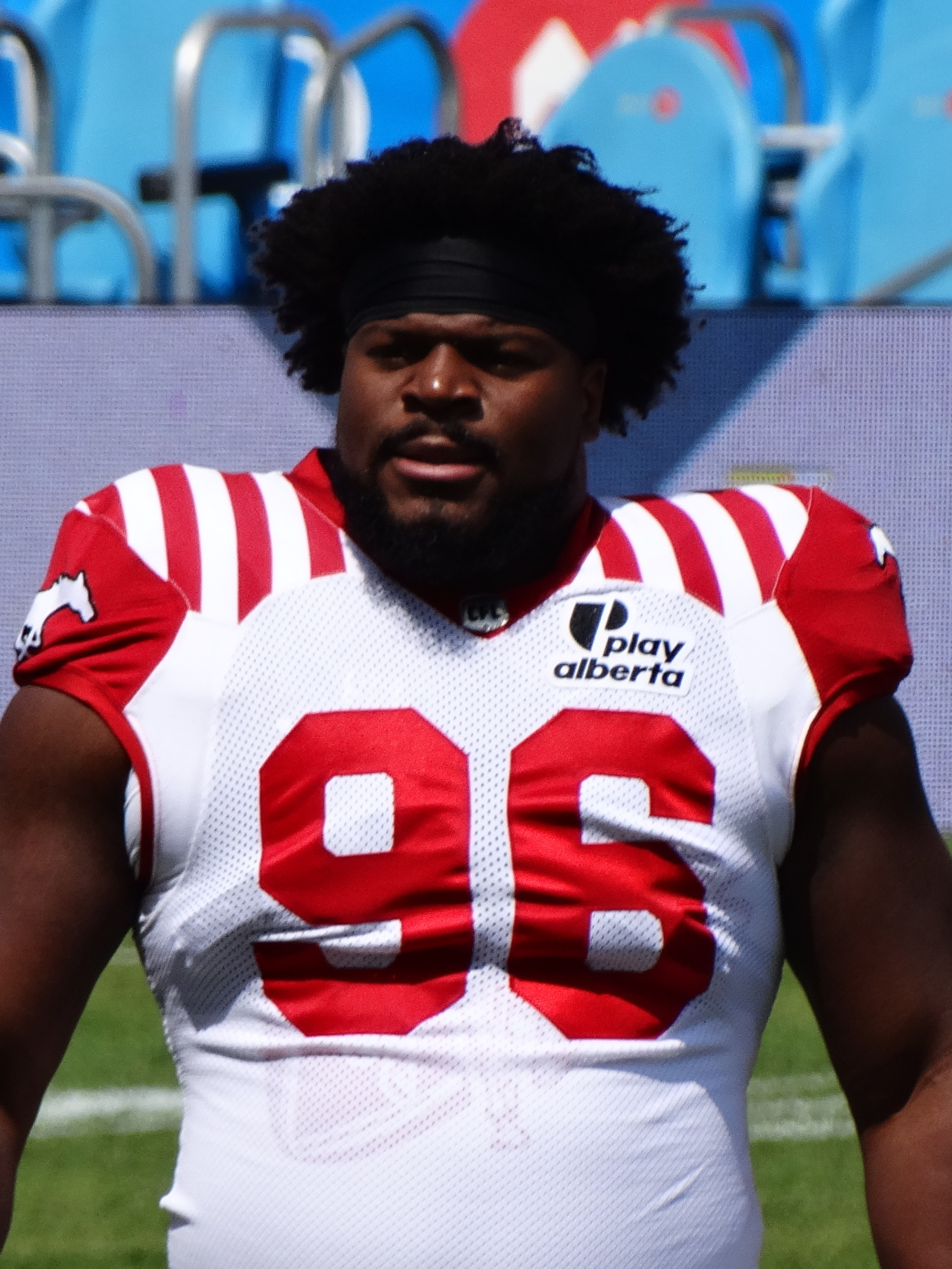
- Hutchings with the Calgary Stampeders in 2025

No. 96 – Calgary Stampeders
- Position: Defensive end
- Roster status: Active
- CFL status: American

Personal information
- Born: December 31, 1999 (age 26)
- Listed height: 6 ft 0 in (1.83 m)
- Listed weight: 304 lb (138 kg)

Career information
- High school: Forney (Forney, Texas)
- College: Texas Tech (2018–2023)
- NFL draft: 2024: undrafted

Career history
- Chicago Bears (2024)*; Calgary Stampeders (2024–2025); Minnesota Vikings (2026)*; Calgary Stampeders (2026–present)
- * Offseason or practice squad member only

Awards and highlights
- CFL All-Star (2025); 2x CFL West All-Star (2025, 2026)

Career CFL statistics as of 2026
- Total tackles: 69
- Sacks: 13
- Pass deflections: 2
- Forced fumbles: 1
- Fumble recoveries: 1
- Stats at CFL.ca
- Stats at Pro Football Reference

Jaylon Hutchings (born December 31, 1999) is an American professional football defensive tackle for the Calgary Stampeders of the Canadian Football League (CFL). Hutchings played college football for the Texas Tech Red Raiders. He also had a stint with the Chicago Bears and Minnesota Vikings of the National Football League (NFL).

== College career ==
Hutchings was rated a three-star prospect coming out of high school. He played for the Texas Tech Red Raiders of Texas Tech University from 2018 to 2023. Across his six seasons as a Red Raider, Hutchings logged 184 tackles, nine sacks, one pass deflection, two forced fumbles, one fumble recovery and one blocked kick. Hutchings suffered a knee injury in a home game against UCF, which would require him to undergo arthroscopic knee surgery. He would miss the 2023 Independence Bowl against California.

== Professional career ==
Pre-draft measurables
Height	Weight	Arm length	Hand span	Wingspan	Bench press
5 ft 11 1/2 in (1.82 m)	304 lb (138 kg)	30 1/2 in (0.77 m)	8 5/8 in (0.22 m)	6 ft 2 1/4 in (1.89 m)	26 reps
All values from Pro Day

=== Chicago Bears ===
After not being selected in the 2024 NFL draft, Hutchings signed with the Chicago Bears as an undrafted free agent on August 11. He was waived by the team on August 26.

=== Calgary Stampeders (first stint) ===
On October 5, 2024, Hutchings was signed to the Calgary Stampeders' practice roster. He was on the active roster for the final two games of the season where he recorded two tackles. In 2025, Hutchings logged 39 tackles, eight sacks, two pass deflections, one forced fumble and fumble recovery. He earned CFL West All-Star and CFL All-Star honors.

=== Minnesota Vikings ===
On January 6, 2026, Hutchings signed a reserve/futures contract with the Minnesota Vikings. He was waived by the Vikings on April 21.

=== Calgary Stampeders (second stint) ===
On May 31, 2026, Hutchings re-signed with the Stampeders. He made his season debut on June 20 against the Saskatchewan Roughriders. Hutchings had 28 tackles and five sacks in 17 games. At the end of the 2026 season, he was named a CFL West All-Star.
