= Damonic Williams =

American football player (born 2004)

No. 96 – Arizona Cardinals
- Position: Nose tackle
- Roster status: Practice squad

Personal information
- Born: September 4, 2004 (age 22); Torrance, California, U.S.
- Listed height: 6 ft 2 in (1.88 m)
- Listed weight: 305 lb (138 kg)

Career information
- High school: Bishop Alemany (Mission Hills, California)
- College: TCU (2022–2023); Oklahoma (2024–2025)
- NFL draft: 2026: undrafted

Career history
- Arizona Cardinals (2026–present)*
- * Offseason or practice squad member only
- Stats at Pro Football Reference

Damonic Williams (born September 4, 2004) is an American professional football nose tackle for the Arizona Cardinals of the National Football League (NFL). He played college football for the TCU Horned Frogs and Oklahoma Sooners.

== Early life ==
Coming out of high school, Williams was rated as a three-star recruit, the 34th defensive tackle, and the 423rd player in the class of 2021. He initially committed to play college football for the California Golden Bears, however de-committed and then re-committed in a span of 24 hours before de-committing again and committing to TCU.

== College career ==
=== TCU ===
Williams decided to forgo his senior season in high school and enroll early at TCU for the 2022 season. As a freshman, he started all 15 games for the Horned Frogs where he notched 27 tackles with four and a half being for a loss, and a sack and a half. He was named a freshman All-American. In 2023, Williams started all 12 games for TCU, tallying 33 tackles with five being for a loss, and three sacks, earning honorable mention all Big 12 Conference honors. After the season, he entered his name into the NCAA transfer portal.

=== Oklahoma ===
Williams transferred to play for the Oklahoma Sooners. On May 3, 2024, Williams committed to transfer to Oklahoma, choosing the Sooners over Texas, LSU and Missouri. On3 rated him the sixth-best defensive lineman in the transfer portal at the time, and Williams cited his relationships with head coach Brent Venables and defensive tackles coach Todd Bates as reasons for his decision.

In 2024, Oklahoma's first season in the Southeastern Conference (SEC), Williams played in all 13 games and started 12 at defensive tackle. He recorded 35 tackles, 4.5 tackles for loss, one sack, two quarterback hurries and a forced fumble, the last of which came in a four-tackle, 1.5-tackle-for-loss performance against Missouri. He was Oklahoma's most-used interior defensive lineman that season. After weighing whether to enter the 2025 NFL draft, Williams announced on December 30, 2024, that he would return to Oklahoma for the 2025 season.

Ahead of the 2025 season, Williams was named one of Oklahoma's seven permanent team captains. He played in 12 games and started 11, missing only the October 4 game against Kent State, and finished with 27 tackles, 4.5 tackles for loss, 1.5 sacks, a pass breakup and three quarterback hurries. He had five tackles against Michigan and a sack against Missouri. The Sooners finished 10–3 and reached the College Football Playoff, where they lost to Alabama 34–24 in the first round. On January 21, 2026, Williams declared for the 2026 NFL draft.

== Professional career ==
Pre-draft measurables
Height	Weight	Arm length	Hand span	Wingspan	20-yard shuttle	Broad jump	Bench press
6 ft 1 5/8 in (1.87 m)	305 lb (138 kg)	33 1/8 in (0.84 m)	10 in (0.25 m)	6 ft 7 7/8 in (2.03 m)	4.96 s	8 ft 4 in (2.54 m)	30 reps
All values from NFL Combine/Pro Day

On April 28, 2026, Williams signed with the Arizona Cardinals after going undrafted in the 2026 NFL draft. Williams was waived by the Cardinals as a part of final roster cuts on August 30; he was re-signed to the team's practice squad the following day.
