= 2024 Southeastern Conference football season =

- League: NCAA Division I Football Bowl Subdivision
- Sport: Football
- Duration: August 31 – December 7, 2024
- Games: 8
- Teams: 16
- TV partner(s): ABC, ESPN, ESPN2, ESPN3, ESPNU, SEC Network, ESPN+

2025 NFL draft
- Top draft pick: Will Campbell, OT, LSU
- Picked by: New England Patriots, 4th overall

SEC Championship Game
- Date: December 7, 2024
- Venue: Mercedes-Benz Stadium, Atlanta, Georgia
- Champions: Georgia
- Runners-up: Texas
- Finals MVP: Daylen Everette, Georgia, CB

SEC seasons
- 2023 2025

2024 Southeastern Conference football standings
	Conf.			Overall
Team	W		L	W		L
No. 4 Texas y^	7	–	1	13	–	3
No. 6 Georgia y$^	6	–	2	11	–	3
No. 9 Tennessee ^	6	–	2	10	–	3
No. 22 Missouri	5	–	3	10	–	3
No. 11 Ole Miss	5	–	3	10	–	3
No. 17 Alabama	5	–	3	9	–	4
No. 19 South Carolina	5	–	3	9	–	4
LSU	5	–	3	9	–	4
Texas A&M	5	–	3	8	–	5
Florida	4	–	4	8	–	5
Arkansas	3	–	5	7	–	6
Vanderbilt	3	–	5	7	–	6
Oklahoma	2	–	6	6	–	7
Auburn	2	–	6	5	–	7
Kentucky	1	–	7	4	–	8
Mississippi State	0	–	8	2	–	10
Championship: Georgia 22, Texas 19 ^{OT}
^ – College Football Playoff participant; $ – Conference champion; y – Championship game participant; Rankings from AP Poll

The 2024 Southeastern Conference football season was the 92nd season of Southeastern Conference (SEC) football and part of the 2024 NCAA Division I FBS football season. This was the SEC's first season with 16 teams with the additions of Texas and Oklahoma, and its first season since 1991 with a non-divisional scheduling format.

== Preseason ==
2024 SEC Spring Football and number of signees on signing day:

- Alabama –
- Arkansas –
- Auburn –
- Florida –
- Georgia –
- Kentucky –
- LSU –
- Mississippi State –
- Missouri –
- Oklahoma-
- Ole Miss –
- South Carolina –
- Tennessee –
- Texas -
- Texas A&M -
- Vanderbilt -

=== Recruiting classes ===
National rankings
Team	ESPN	Rivals	24/7	On3 Recruits	Total signees
Alabama	2	2	2	2	28
Arkansas	29	37	31	31	17
Auburn	9	8	10	8	20
Florida	10	15	13	10	20
Georgia	1	1	1	1	28
Kentucky	23	24	24	25	25
LSU	7	11	7	7	30
Mississippi State	26	26	28	26	26
Missouri	22	22	20	21	21
Oklahoma	8	7	8	9	28
Ole Miss	20	21	21	20	22
South Carolina	19	30	22	19	16
Tennessee	14	14	14	13	23
Texas	5	3	6	6	22
Texas A&M	18	20	19	17	17
Vanderbilt	45	40	40	39	21

Note: ESPN only ranks the top 40 teams.

=== SEC Media Days ===
The 2024 SEC Media days took place on July 15–18, 2024 at the Omni Hotel in downtown Dallas, TX. It was the fourth time they were held outside of Birmingham, AL. Each team was expected to have its head coach available to talk to the media at the event, which was televised on SEC Network and ESPN.

Preseason polls were released in July 2024.

The schedule for the teams was:

Date	School	Coach	Player(s)
July 15	LSU	Brian Kelly	Garrett Nussmeier (QB), Mason Taylor (TE) & Harold Perkins (LB)
July 15	Ole Miss	Lane Kiffin	Jaxson Dart (QB) Tre Harris (WR) & Jared Ivey (DE)
July 15	South Carolina	Shane Beamer	Alex Huntley (DT), Luke Doty (ATH) & Debo Williams (LB)
July 15	Vanderbilt	Clark Lea	Gunnar Hansen (OL), Langston Patterson (LB) & CJ Taylor (S)
July 16	Georgia	Kirby Smart	Carson Beck (QB), Mykel Williams (DL) & Malaki Starks (S)
July 16	Missouri	Eliah Drinkwitz	Luther Burden III (WR), Brady Cook (QB) & Kristian Williams (DL)
July 16	Oklahoma	Brent Venables	Jackson Arnold (QB), Danny Stutsman (LB) & Billy Bowman Jr. (DB)
July 16	Tennessee	Josh Heupel	Cooper Mays (C), Keenan Pili (LB) & Omari Thomas (DL)
July 17	Alabama	Kalen DeBoer	Jalen Milroe (QB), Tyler Booker (OL) & Malachi Moore (DB)
July 17	Florida	Billy Napier	Graham Mertz (QB), Shemar James (ILB) & Montrell Johnson Jr. (RB)
July 17	Mississippi State	Jeff Lebby	Blake Shapen (QB), Albert Reese IV (OL) & John Lewis (LB)
July 17	Texas	Steve Sarkisian	Quinn Ewers (QB) Kelvin Banks Jr. (OL) & Jahdae Barron (DB)
July 18	Arkansas	Sam Pittman	Andrew Armstrong (WR), Taylen Green (QB) & Landon Jackson (DE)
July 18	Auburn	Hugh Freeze	Payton Thorne (QB), Eugene Asante (LB) & Keldric Faulk (DE)
July 18	Kentucky	Mark Stoops	Marques Cox (OL) D’Eryk Jackson (LB) & Deone Walker (DL)
July 18	Texas A&M	Mike Elko	Shemar Turner (DL), Taurean York (LB) & Trey Zuhn III (OL)

==== Preseason media polls ====
Teams currently listed alphabetically

SEC
Predicted finish	Team	Votes (1st place)
1	Georgia	3330 (165)
2	Texas	3041 (27)
3	Alabama	2891 (12)
4	Ole Miss	2783 (4)
5	LSU	2322 (2)
6	Missouri	2240
7	Tennessee	2168
8	Oklahoma	2022
9	Texas A&M	1684
10	Auburn	1382
11	Kentucky	1371
12	Florida	1146
13	South Carolina	923 (1)
14	Arkansas	749
15	Mississippi State	623
16	Vanderbilt	293 (2)

Media poll (SEC Championship)
Rank	Team	Votes
1	Georgia	165
2	Texas	27
3	Alabama	12
4	Ole Miss	4
5	LSU	2
6	Vanderbilt	2
7	South Carolina	1

=== Preseason awards ===
==== All−American Teams ====
Player	AP 1st Team	AP 2nd Team	AS 1st Team	AS 2nd Team	AS 3rd Team	AS 4th Team	CBS 1st Team	CBS 2nd Team	CFN 1st Team	CFN 2nd Team	ESPN	PFF 1st Team	PFF 2nd Team	PFF 3rd Team	SI 1st Team	SI 2nd Team	SN 1st Team	SN 2nd Team	USAT 1st Team	USAT 2nd Team	WCFF 1st Team	WCFF 2nd Team
Bert Auburn						✓																
Kelvin Banks	✓		✓				✓			✓								✓				✓
Jahdae Barron						✓																
Carson Beck	✓		✓				✓				✓	✓					✓		✓		✓	
Parker Brailsford	✓		✓				✓		✓		✓	✓					✓		✓			✓
Tyler Booker		✓	✓				✓		✓		✓	✓				✓						
Isaiah Bond					✓																	
Billy Bowman Jr.		✓			✓																	
Barion Brown				✓						✓								✓			✓	
Luther Burden	✓		✓						✓	✓					✓		✓					✓
James Burnip				✓																	✓	
Will Campbell	✓		✓				✓		✓	✓					✓		✓				✓	
Jeremy Crawshaw																✓						
Trevor Etienne						✓														✓		
Quinn Ewers						✓																✓
Dylan Fairchild		✓									✓											
Earnest Greene					✓													✓				
Maxwell Hairston						✓																
Tre Harris		✓		✓																✓		
Landon Jackson					✓			✓														
Emery Jones					✓				✓		✓											
Deontae Lawson					✓				✓		✓											✓
Cooper Mays		✓					✓		✓		✓											✓
Jalen Milroe					✓																	
Smael Mondon						✓																
Malachi Moore					✓						✓					✓						
Graham Nicholson	✓		✓				✓		✓	✓									✓		✓	
Walter Nolen					✓															✓		
James Pearce	✓			✓				✓	✓	✓									✓			
Harold Perkins Jr.	✓					✓		✓	✓	✓										✓		
Caden Prieskorn						✓																
Tate Ratledge	✓			✓			✓		✓		✓	✓					✓		✓		✓	
Keionte Scott						✓																
Nic Scourton		✓		✓					✓		✓				✓							
Malaki Starks	✓		✓				✓		✓											✓		
Danny Stutsman		✓	✓				✓		✓	✓										✓	✓	
Brett Thorson					✓																	
Shemar Turner						✓																
Princely Umanmielen						✓																
Deone Walker		✓		✓				✓	✓		✓				✓							✓
Mykel Williams				✓					✓													✓

==== Individual awards ====
Award	Head Coach/Player	School	Position	Year	Ref
Lott Trophy	Deontae Lawson	Alabama	LB	R-Jr.	
Lott Trophy	Malachi Moore	Alabama	CB	Gr.	
Lott Trophy	Landon Jackson	Arkansas	DL	Sr.	
Lott Trophy	Jalon Walker	Georgia	LB	Jr.	
Lott Trophy	Malaki Starks	Georgia	CB	Jr.	
Lott Trophy	Deone Walker	Kentucky	DL	Jr.	
Lott Trophy	Harold Perkins	LSU	LB	Jr.	
Lott Trophy	Danny Stutsman	Oklahoma	LB	Sr.	
Lott Trophy	Nick Emmanwori	South Carolina	CB	Jr.	
Lott Trophy	James Pearce	Tennessee	DL	Jr.	
Lott Trophy	Andrew Mukuba	Texas	CB	Sr.	
Lott Trophy	Jahdae Barron	Texas	CB	Sr.	
Lott Trophy	Nic Scourton	Texas A&M	DL	Jr.	
Dodd Trophy	Kirby Smart	Georgia	HC	--	
Dodd Trophy	Brian Kelly	LSU	HC	--	
Dodd Trophy	Eliah Drinkwitz	Missouri	HC	--	
Dodd Trophy	Lane Kiffin	Ole Miss	HC	--	
Dodd Trophy	Josh Heupel	Tennessee	HC	--	
Dodd Trophy	Steve Sarkisian	Texas	HC	--	
Maxwell Award	Jalen Milroe	Alabama	QB	R-Jr.	
Maxwell Award	Jarquez Hunter	Auburn	RB	Sr.	
Maxwell Award	Graham Mertz	Florida	QB	Sr.	
Maxwell Award	Carson Beck	Georgia	QB	Sr.	
Maxwell Award	Trevor Etienne	Georgia	RB	Jr.	
Maxwell Award	Garrett Nussmeier	LSU	QB	Jr.	
Maxwell Award	Kyren Lacy	LSU	WR	Sr.	
Maxwell Award	Brady Cook	Missouri	QB	Sr.	
Maxwell Award	Luther Burden III	Missouri	WR	Jr.	
Maxwell Award	Jackson Arnold	Oklahoma	QB	So.	
Maxwell Award	Jaxson Dart	Ole Miss	QB	Sr.	
Maxwell Award	Raheim Sanders	South Carolina	RB	Sr.	
Maxwell Award	Nico Iamaleava	Tennessee	QB	R-Fr.	
Maxwell Award	Quinn Ewers	Texas	QB	Jr.	
Maxwell Award	Conner Weigman	Texas A&M	QB	So.	
Patrick Mannelly Award	Kneeland Hibbet	Alabama	LS	Sr.	
Patrick Mannelly Award	Eli Stein	Arkansas	LS	Jr.	
Patrick Mannelly Award	Rocco Underwood	Florida	LS	R-Jr.	
Patrick Mannelly Award	Beau Gardner	Georgia	LS	Sr.	
Patrick Mannelly Award	Slade Roy	LSU	LS	Sr.	
Patrick Mannelly Award	Ben Anderson	Oklahoma	LS	R-So.	
Patrick Mannelly Award	Julian Ashby	Vanderbilt	LS	Gr.	
Outland Trophy	Parker Brailsford	Alabama	OL	R-So.	
Outland Trophy	Tyler Booker	Alabama	OL	Jr.	
Outland Trophy	Tim Smith	Alabama	DL	Gr.	
Outland Trophy	Nazir Stackhouse	Georgia	DL	Gr.	
Outland Trophy	Tate Ratledge	Georgia	OL	Gr.	
Outland Trophy	Dylan Fairchild	Georgia	OL	Jr.	
Outland Trophy	Xavier Truss	Georgia	OL	Sr.	
Outland Trophy	Deone Walker	Kentucky	DL	Jr.	
Outland Trophy	Eli Cox	Kentucky	OL	Sr.	
Outland Trophy	Emery Jones	LSU	OL	Jr.	
Outland Trophy	Will Campbell	LSU	OL	Jr.	
Outland Trophy	Armand Membou	Missouri	OL	Jr.	
Outland Trophy	Cam'Ron Johnson	Missouri	OL	Sr.	
Outland Trophy	Walter Nolen	Ole Miss	DL	Jr.	
Outland Trophy	Branson Hickman	Oklahoma	OL	R-Sr.	
Outland Trophy	Kelvin Banks	Texas	OL	Jr.	
Outland Trophy	Chase Bisontis	Texas A&M	OL	So.	
Bronko Nagurski Trophy	Deontae Lawson	Alabama	LB	R-Jr.	
Bronko Nagurski Trophy	Malachi Moore	Alabama	CB	Gr.	
Bronko Nagurski Trophy	Landon Jackson	Arkansas	DL	Sr.	
Bronko Nagurski Trophy	Smael Mondon Jr.	Georgia	LB	Sr.	
Bronko Nagurski Trophy	Malaki Starks	Georgia	DB	Jr.	
Bronko Nagurski Trophy	Mykel Williams	Georgia	DL	Jr.	
Bronko Nagurski Trophy	Harold Perkins Jr.	LSU	LB	Jr.	
Bronko Nagurski Trophy	Deone Walker	Kentucky	DL	Jr.	
Bronko Nagurski Trophy	Maxwell Hairston	Kentucky	DB	Jr.	
Bronko Nagurski Trophy	Johnny Walker Jr.	Missouri	DE	Sr.	
Bronko Nagurski Trophy	Walter Nolen	Ole Miss	DL	Jr.	
Bronko Nagurski Trophy	Billy Bowman Jr.	Oklahoma	DL	Sr.	
Bronko Nagurski Trophy	Danny Stutsman	Oklahoma	LB	Sr.	
Bronko Nagurski Trophy	Debo Williams	South Carolina	LB	Sr.	
Bronko Nagurski Trophy	James Pearce	Tennessee	DE	Jr.	
Bronko Nagurski Trophy	Anthony Hill Jr.	Texas	LB	So.	
Bronko Nagurski Trophy	Jahdae Barron	Texas	CB	Sr.	
Bronko Nagurski Trophy	Nic Scourton	Texas A&M	DL	Jr.	
Bronko Nagurski Trophy	Shemar Turner	Texas A&M	DL	Sr.	
Jim Thorpe Award	Malachi Moore	Alabama	CB	Gr.	
Jim Thorpe Award	Daylen Everette	Georgia	CB	Jr.	
Jim Thorpe Award	Maxwell Hairston	Kentucky	DB	Jr.	
Jim Thorpe Award	Billy Bowman Jr.	Oklahoma	DL	Sr.	
Jet Award	Isaiah Sategna III	Arkansas	WR	So.	
Jet Award	Barion Brown	Kentucky	WR	Jr.	
Paul Hornung Award	Keionte Scott	Auburn	CB	Sr.	
Paul Hornung Award	Trevor Etienne	Georgia	RB	Jr.	
Paul Hornung Award	Barion Brown	Kentucky	WR	Jr.	
Paul Hornung Award	Luther Burden III	Missouri	WR	Jr.	
Paul Hornung Award	Kevin Coleman Jr.	Mississippi State	WR	Jr.	
Paul Hornung Award	Jaydon Blue	Texas	RB	Jr.	
Wuerffel Trophy	Tim Keenan III	Alabama	DL	Jr.	
Wuerffel Trophy	Cam Ball	Arkansas	DL	Sr.	
Wuerffel Trophy	Luke Deal	Auburn	TE	Gr.	
Wuerffel Trophy	Graham Mertz	Florida	QB	R-Sr.	
Wuerffel Trophy	Malaki Starks	Georgia	CB	Jr.	
Wuerffel Trophy	J. J. Weaver	Kentucky	LB	Sr.	
Wuerffel Trophy	Will Campbell	LSU	OL	Jr.	
Wuerffel Trophy	Nick Barr-Mina	Mississippi State	PK	Sr.	
Wuerffel Trophy	Kristian Williams	Missouri	DT	Gr.	
Wuerffel Trophy	Gavin Sawchuk	Oklahoma	RB	So.	
Wuerffel Trophy	JJ Pegues	Ole Miss	DT	Sr.	
Wuerffel Trophy	Alex Huntley	South Carolina	DT	Sr.	
Wuerffel Trophy	Bru McCoy	Tennessee	WR	Sr.	
Wuerffel Trophy	Hayden Conner	Texas	OL	Sr.	
Wuerffel Trophy	Albert Regis	Texas A&M	DL	Jr.	
Wuerffel Trophy	Richie Hoskins	Vanderbilt	WR	Sr.	
Lou Groza Award	Graham Nicholson	Alabama	PK	Sr.	
Lou Groza Award	Alex McPherson	Auburn	PK	So.	
Lou Groza Award	Trey Smack	Florida	PK	Jr.	
Lou Groza Award	Peyton Woodring	Georgia	PK	So.	
Lou Groza Award	Caden Davis	Ole Miss	PK	Sr.	
Lou Groza Award	Bert Auburn	Texas	PK	Sr.	
Lou Groza Award	Randy Bond	Texas A&M	PK	Sr.	
Ray Guy Award	James Burnip	Alabama	P	Sr.	
Ray Guy Award	Oscar Chapman	Auburn	P	Sr.	
Ray Guy Award	Brett Thorson	Georgia	P	Jr.	
Ray Guy Award	Luke Elzinga	Oklahoma	P	Sr.	
Ray Guy Award	Kai Kroeger	South Carolina	P	Gr.	
Ray Guy Award	Jesse Mirco	Vanderbilt	P	Gr.	
Walter Camp Award	Jalen Milroe	Alabama	QB	R-Jr.	
Walter Camp Award	Malachi Moore	Alabama	CB	Gr.	
Walter Camp Award	Carson Beck	Georgia	QB	Sr.	
Walter Camp Award	Malaki Starks	Georgia	CB	Jr.	
Walter Camp Award	Harold Perkins Jr.	LSU	LB	Jr.	
Walter Camp Award	Luther Burden III	Missouri	WR	Jr.	
Walter Camp Award	Jaxson Dart	Ole Miss	QB	Sr.	
Walter Camp Award	Walter Nolen	Ole Miss	DL	Jr.	
Walter Camp Award	Danny Stutsman	Oklahoma	LB	Sr.	
Walter Camp Award	James Pearce	Tennessee	DE	Jr.	
Walter Camp Award	Quinn Ewers	Texas	QB	Jr.	
Walter Camp Award	Conner Weigman	Texas A&M	QB	So.	

Award	Head Coach/Player	School	Position	Year	Ref
Doak Walker Award	Jam Miller	Alabama	RB	Jr.	
Doak Walker Award	Justice Haynes	Alabama	RB	So.	
Doak Walker Award	Jarquez Hunter	Auburn	RB	Sr.	
Doak Walker Award	Montrell Johnson Jr.	Florida	RB	R-Jr.	
Doak Walker Award	Trevor Etienne	Georgia	RB	Jr.	
Doak Walker Award	DeaMonte Trayanum	Kentucky	RB	Sr.	
Doak Walker Award	Marcus Carroll	Missouri	RB	Sr.	
Doak Walker Award	Nate Noel	Missouri	RB	Sr.	
Doak Walker Award	Gavin Sawchuk	Oklahoma	RB	So.	
Doak Walker Award	Ulysses Bentley IV	Ole Miss	RB	Sr.	
Doak Walker Award	Raheim Sanders	South Carolina	RB	Sr.	
Doak Walker Award	Dylan Sampson	Tennessee	RB	Jr.	
Doak Walker Award	CJ Baxter	Texas	RB	So.	
Doak Walker Award	Jaydon Blue	Texas	RB	Jr.	
Biletnikoff Award	Andrew Armstrong	Arkansas	WR	Sr.	
Biletnikoff Award	Robert Lewis	Auburn	WR	Sr.	
Biletnikoff Award	Ja'Mori Maclin	Kentucky	WR	Jr.	
Biletnikoff Award	CJ Daniels	LSU	WR	Gr.	
Biletnikoff Award	Luther Burden III	Missouri	WR	Jr.	
Biletnikoff Award	Nic Anderson	Oklahoma	WR	R-So.	
Biletnikoff Award	Tre Harris	Ole Miss	WR	Gr.	
Biletnikoff Award	Squirrel White	Tennessee	WR	Jr.	
Davey O'Brien Award	Jalen Milroe	Alabama	QB	R-Jr.	
Davey O'Brien Award	Graham Mertz	Florida	QB	R-Sr.	
Davey O'Brien Award	Carson Beck	Georgia	QB	Sr.	
Davey O'Brien Award	Brady Cook	Missouri	QB	Sr.	
Davey O'Brien Award	Jaxson Dart	Ole Miss	QB	Sr.	
Davey O'Brien Award	Quinn Ewers	Texas	QB	Jr.	
John Mackey Award	CJ Dippre	Alabama	TE	Sr.	
John Mackey Award	Luke Hasz	Arkansas	TE	So.	
John Mackey Award	Rivaldo Fairweather	Auburn	TE	Sr.	
John Mackey Award	Arlis Boardingham	Florida	TE	So.	
John Mackey Award	Benjamin Yurosek	Georgia	TE	Gr.	
John Mackey Award	Oscar Delp	Georgia	TE	Jr.	
John Mackey Award	Mason Taylor	LSU	TE	Jr.	
John Mackey Award	Brett Norfleet	Missouri	TE	So.	
John Mackey Award	Caden Prieskorn	Ole Miss	TE	Gr.	
John Mackey Award	De’Quan Wright	Ole Miss	TE	Jr.	
John Mackey Award	Amari Niblack	Texas	TE	Jr.	
John Mackey Award	Donovan Green	Texas A&M	TE	Jr.	
Rimington Trophy	Parker Brailsford	Alabama	OL	R-So.	
Rimington Trophy	Connor Lew	Auburn	OL	So.	
Rimington Trophy	Jake Slaughter	Florida	OL	R-Jr.	
Rimington Trophy	Jared Wilson	Georgia	OL	Jr.	
Rimington Trophy	Ethan Miner	Mississippi State	OL	Sr.	
Rimington Trophy	Connor Tollison	Missouri	OL	Jr.	
Rimington Trophy	Branson Hickman	Oklahoma	OL	R-Sr.	
Rimington Trophy	Vershon Lee	South Carolina	OL	R-Sr.	
Rimington Trophy	Cooper Mays	Tennessee	OL	Gr.	
Rimington Trophy	Jake Majors	Texas	OL	Sr.	
Bednarik Award	Deontae Lawson	Alabama	LB	R-Jr.	
Bednarik Award	Malachi Moore	Alabama	CB	Gr.	
Bednarik Award	Landon Jackson	Arkansas	DL	Sr.	
Bednarik Award	Eugene Asante	Auburn	LB	Sr.	
Bednarik Award	Shemar James	Florida	LB	Jr.	
Bednarik Award	Malaki Starks	Georgia	CB	Jr.	
Bednarik Award	Mykel Williams	Georgia	DE	Jr.	
Bednarik Award	Smael Mondon	Georgia	LB	Sr.	
Bednarik Award	Deone Walker	Kentucky	DL	Jr.	
Bednarik Award	Maxwell Hairston	Kentucky	DB	Jr.	
Bednarik Award	Harold Perkins Jr.	LSU	LB	Jr.	
Bednarik Award	Johnny Walker Jr.	Missouri	DE	Sr.	
Bednarik Award	Billy Bowman Jr.	Oklahoma	DL	Sr.	
Bednarik Award	Danny Stutsman	Oklahoma	LB	Sr.	
Bednarik Award	Princely Umanmielen	Ole Miss	DE	Sr.	
Bednarik Award	Tonka Hemingway	South Carolina	DL	Gr.	
Bednarik Award	James Pearce	Tennessee	DE	Jr.	
Bednarik Award	Jahdae Barron	Texas	CB	Sr.	
Bednarik Award	Nic Scourton	Texas A&M	DL	Jr.	
Bednarik Award	Shemar Turner	Texas A&M	DL	Sr.	
Bednarik Award	CJ Taylor	Vanderbilt	LB	Sr.	
Butkus Award	Deontae Lawson	Alabama	LB	R-Jr.	
Butkus Award	Jihaad Campbell	Alabama	LB	Jr.	
Butkus Award	Eugene Asante	Auburn	LB	Sr.	
Butkus Award	Shemar James	Florida	LB	Jr.	
Butkus Award	Smael Mondon Jr.	Georgia	LB	Sr.	
Butkus Award	D’Eryk Jackson	Kentucky	LB	Sr.	
Butkus Award	Jamon Dumas-Johnson	Kentucky	LB	Jr.	
Butkus Award	Harold Perkins Jr.	LSU	LB	Jr.	
Butkus Award	Danny Stutsman	Oklahoma	LB	Sr.	
Butkus Award	Debo Williams	South Carolina	LB	R-Sr.	
Butkus Award	Demetrius Knight	South Carolina	LB	Gr.	
Butkus Award	Anthony Hill Jr.	Texas	LB	So.	
Johnny Unitas Golden Arm Award	Jalen Milroe	Alabama	QB	R-Jr.	
Johnny Unitas Golden Arm Award	Payton Thorne	Auburn	QB	Sr.	
Johnny Unitas Golden Arm Award	Graham Mertz	Florida	QB	R-Sr.	
Johnny Unitas Golden Arm Award	Carson Beck	Georgia	QB	Sr.	
Johnny Unitas Golden Arm Award	Brock Vandagriff	Kentucky	QB	R-Jr.	
Johnny Unitas Golden Arm Award	Garrett Nussmeier	LSU	QB	R-Jr.	
Johnny Unitas Golden Arm Award	Blake Shapen	Mississippi State	QB	R-Sr.	
Johnny Unitas Golden Arm Award	Brady Cook	Missouri	QB	Sr.	
Johnny Unitas Golden Arm Award	Jaxson Dart	Ole Miss	QB	Sr.	
Johnny Unitas Golden Arm Award	Quinn Ewers	Texas	QB	Jr.	
Johnny Unitas Golden Arm Award	Conner Weigman	Texas A&M	QB	So.	
Manning Award	Jalen Milroe	Alabama	QB	R-Jr.	
Manning Award	Graham Mertz	Florida	QB	R-Sr.	
Manning Award	Carson Beck	Georgia	QB	Sr.	
Manning Award	Brady Cook	Missouri	QB	Sr.	
Manning Award	Jaxson Dart	Ole Miss	QB	Sr.	
Manning Award	Quinn Ewers	Texas	QB	Jr.	
Polynesian College Football Player Of The Year Award	Jaxson Moi	Tennessee	DL	Jr.	
Polynesian College Football Player Of The Year Award	Keenan Pili	Tennessee	LB	Gr.	
Polynesian College Football Player Of The Year Award	Nico Iamaleava	Tennessee	QB	R-Fr.	
Polynesian College Football Player Of The Year Award	Jermayne Lole	Texas	DL	Sr.	
Polynesian College Football Player Of The Year Award	Tiaoalli Savea	Texas	DL	Sr.	
Rotary Lombardi Award	Deontae Lawson	Alabama	LB	R-Jr.	
Rotary Lombardi Award	Jaeden Roberts	Alabama	OL	R-Jr.	
Rotary Lombardi Award	Parker Brailsford	Alabama	OL	R-So.	
Rotary Lombardi Award	Tyler Booker	Alabama	OL	Jr.	
Rotary Lombardi Award	Landon Jackson	Arkansas	DL	Sr.	
Rotary Lombardi Award	Tate Ratledge	Georgia	OL	Gr.	
Rotary Lombardi Award	Dylan Fairchild	Georgia	OL	Jr.	
Rotary Lombardi Award	Mykel Williams	Georgia	DE	Jr.	
Rotary Lombardi Award	Deone Walker	Kentucky	DL	Jr.	
Rotary Lombardi Award	Emery Jones Jr.	LSU	OL	Jr.	
Rotary Lombardi Award	Will Campbell	LSU	OL	Jr.	
Rotary Lombardi Award	Harold Perkins Jr.	LSU	LB	Jr.	
Rotary Lombardi Award	Walter Nolen	Ole Miss	DL	Jr.	
Rotary Lombardi Award	Danny Stutsman	Oklahoma	LB	Sr.	
Rotary Lombardi Award	James Pearce	Tennessee	DE	Jr.	
Rotary Lombardi Award	Kelvin Banks Jr.	Texas	OL	Jr.	
Rotary Lombardi Award	Trey Moore	Texas	DE	Jr.	
Rotary Lombardi Award	Nic Scourton	Texas A&M	DL	Jr.	
Rotary Lombardi Award	Shemar Turner	Texas A&M	DL	Sr.	
Earl Campbell Tyler Rose Award					

==== Preseason All-SEC ====
===== Media =====
First Team

Position	Player	Class	Team
First Team Offense
QB	Carson Beck	Sr.	Georgia
RB	Trevor Etienne	Jr.	Georgia
RB	Jarquez Hunter	Sr.	Auburn
WR	Luther Burden III	Jr.	Missouri
WR	Tre Harris	Sr.	Ole Miss
TE	Caden Prieskorn	Sr.	Ole Miss
OL	Tyler Booker	Jr.	Alabama
OL	Will Campbell	Jr.	LSU
OL	Kelvin Banks Jr.	Jr.	Texas
OL	Tate Ratledge	Sr.	Georgia
C	Cooper Mays	Sr.	Tennessee
First Team Defense
DL	James Pearce Jr.	Jr.	Tennessee
DL	Walter Nolen	Jr.	Ole Miss
DL	Deone Walker	Jr.	Kentucky
DL	Nazir Stackhouse	Sr.	Georgia
LB	Harold Perkins	Jr.	LSU
LB	Danny Stutsman	Sr.	Oklahoma
LB	Deontae Lawson	R-Jr.	Alabama
LB	Mykel Williams	Jr.	Georgia
DB	Malaki Starks	Jr.	Georgia
DB	Malachi Moore	Gr.	Alabama
DB	Billy Bowman Jr.	Sr.	Oklahoma
DB	Maxwell Hairston	Jr.	Kentucky
First Team Special Teams
PK	Bert Auburn	Sr.	Texas
P	James Burnip	R-Sr.	Alabama
LS	Kneeland Hibbett	Sr.	Alabama
KS	Alex McPherson	So.	Auburn
RS	Barion Brown	Jr.	Kentucky
AP	Zavion Thomas	Jr.	LSU

Second Team

Position	Player	Class	Team
Second Team Offense
QB	Quinn Ewers	Jr.	Texas
RB	Raheim Sanders	Sr.	South Carolina
RB	CJ Baxter	So.	Texas
RB	Montrell Johnson Jr.	Sr.	Florida
WR	Isaiah Bond	Jr.	Texas
WR	Kyren Lacy	R-Sr.	LSU
TE	Mason Taylor	Jr.	LSU
OL	Emery Jones	Jr.	LSU
OL	Kadyn Proctor	So.	Alabama
OL	Xavier Truss	Sr.	Georgia
OL	Dylan Fairchild	Jr.	Georgia
C	Parker Brailsford	R-So.	Alabama
Second Team Defense
DL	Shemar Turner	Sr.	Texas A&M
DL	Landon Jackson	Sr.	Arkansas
DL	Nic Scourton	Jr.	Texas A&M
DL	Tim Smith	Gr.	Alabama
DL	Jared Ivey	Sr.	Ole Miss
LB	Debo Williams	R-Sr.	South Carolina
LB	Anthony Hill Jr.	So.	Texas
LB	Smael Mondon Jr.	Sr.	Georgia
DB	Jahdae Barron	Sr.	Texas
DB	Major Burns	Sr.	LSU
DB	Andrew Mukuba	Sr.	Texas
DB	Malik Muhammad	So.	Texas
Second Team Special Teams
PK	Graham Nicholson	Sr.	Alabama
P	Brett Thorson	Jr.	Georgia
LS	Hunter Rogers	R-Sr.	South Carolina
KS	Will Stone	Jr.	Texas
RS	Zavion Thomas	Jr.	LSU
AP	Dillion Bell	Jr.	Georgia

Third Team

Position	Player	Class	Team
Third Team Offense
QB	Jalen Milroe	R-Jr.	Alabama
RB	Justice Haynes	So.	Alabama
RB	Ulysses Bentley	Sr.	Ole Miss
WR	Deion Burks	R-Jr.	Oklahoma
WR	Dominic Lovett	Sr.	Georgia
TE	Oscar Delp	Jr.	Georgia
OL	Earnest Greene	R-So.	Georgia
OL	Marques Cox	Sr.	Kentucky
OL	Trey Zuhn III	Jr.	Texas A&M
OL	Jaeden Roberts	R-Jr.	Alabama
C	Jake Majors	Sr.	Texas
Third Team Defense
DL	Tim Keenan III	R-Jr.	Alabama
DL	Princely Umanmielen	Sr.	Ole Miss
DL	Trey Moore	Jr.	Texas
DL	Tonka Hemingway	Gr.	South Carolina
LB	Jamon Dumas-Johnson	Sr.	Kentucky
LB	Jihaad Campbell	Jr.	Alabama
LB	Eugene Asante	Sr.	Auburn
DB	Domani Jackson	Jr.	Alabama
DB	Daylen Everette	Jr.	Georgia
DB	Jason Marshall Jr.	Sr.	Florida
DB	Keon Sabb	R-So.	Alabama
DB	Nick Emmanwori	Jr.	South Carolina
Third Team Special Teams
PK	Alex McPherson	So.	Auburn
P	Jeremy Crawshaw	Sr.	Florida
LS	Slade Roy	Sr.	LSU
KS	Trey Smack	Jr.	Florida
RS	Keionte Scott	Sr.	Auburn
AP	Barion Brown	Jr.	Kentucky
AP	Jaydon Blue	Jr.	Texas

===== Coaches =====
First Team

Position	Player	Class	Team
First Team Offense
QB	Carson Beck	Sr.	Georgia
RB	Trevor Etienne	Jr.	Georgia
RB	Jarquez Hunter	Sr.	Auburn
WR	Luther Burden III	Jr.	Missouri
WR	Tre Harris	Sr.	Ole Miss
TE	Caden Prieskorn	Sr.	Ole Miss
OL	Tyler Booker	Jr.	Alabama
OL	Will Campbell	Jr.	LSU
OL	Kelvin Banks Jr.	Jr.	Texas
OL	Tate Ratledge	Sr.	Georgia
C	Cooper Mays	Sr.	Tennessee
First Team Defense
DL	James Pearce Jr.	Jr.	Tennessee
DL	Walter Nolen	Jr.	Ole Miss
DL	Deone Walker	Jr.	Kentucky
DL	Nazir Stackhouse	Sr.	Georgia
DL	Landon Jackson	Sr.	Arkansas
LB	Harold Perkins	Jr.	LSU
LB	Danny Stutsman	Sr.	Oklahoma
LB	Deontae Lawson	R-Jr.	Alabama
DB	Malaki Starks	Jr.	Georgia
DB	Malachi Moore	Gr.	Alabama
DB	Billy Bowman Jr.	Sr.	Oklahoma
DB	Maxwell Hairston	Jr.	Kentucky
First Team Special Teams
PK	Bert Auburn	Sr.	Texas
P	James Burnip	R-Sr.	Alabama
LS	Hunter Rogers	R-Sr.	South Carolina
KS	Alex McPherson	So.	Auburn
RS	Barion Brown	Jr.	Kentucky
AP	Zavion Thomas	Jr.	LSU

Second Team

Position	Player	Class	Team
Second Team Offense
QB	Quinn Ewers	Jr.	Texas
RB	Raheim Sanders	Sr.	South Carolina
RB	Montrell Johnson Jr.	Sr.	Florida
WR	Isaiah Bond	Jr.	Texas
WR	Kyren Lacy	R-Sr.	LSU
TE	Oscar Delp	Jr.	Georgia
OL	Emery Jones	Jr.	LSU
OL	Kadyn Proctor	So.	Alabama
OL	Xavier Truss	Sr.	Georgia
OL	Dylan Fairchild	Jr.	Georgia
C	Parker Brailsford	R-So.	Alabama
Second Team Defense
DL	Shemar Turner	Sr.	Texas A&M
DL	Nic Scourton	Jr.	Texas A&M
DL	Tim Smith	Gr.	Alabama
DL	Princely Umanmielen	Sr.	Ole Miss
LB	Debo Williams	R-Sr.	South Carolina
LB	Mykel Williams	Jr.	Georgia
LB	Smael Mondon Jr.	Sr.	Georgia
DB	Jason Marshall Jr.	Sr.	Florida
DB	Major Burns	Sr.	LSU
DB	Andrew Mukuba	Sr.	Texas
DB	Jahdae Barron	Sr.	Texas
Second Team Special Teams
PK	Graham Nicholson	Sr.	Alabama
P	Jeremy Crawshaw	Sr.	Florida
LS	Kneeland Hibbett	Sr.	Alabama
KS	Will Stone	Jr.	Texas
RS	Keionte Scott	Sr.	Auburn
AP	Dillion Bell	Jr.	Georgia

Third Team

Position	Player	Class	Team
Third Team Offense
QB	Jalen Milroe	R-Jr.	Alabama
RB	Justice Haynes	So.	Alabama
RB	Ulysses Bentley	Sr.	Ole Miss
RB	Dylan Sampson	Jr.	Tennessee
WR	Squirrel White	Jr.	Tennessee
WR	Dominic Lovett	Sr.	Georgia
TE	Mason Taylor	Jr.	LSU
OL	Earnest Greene	R-So.	Georgia
OL	Marques Cox	Sr.	Kentucky
OL	Armand Membou	Jr.	Missouri
OL	Cam’Ron Johnson	Sr.	Missouri
C	Eli Cox	Sr.	Kentucky
Third Team Defense
DL	Tim Keenan III	R-Jr.	Alabama
DL	Jared Ivey	Sr.	Ole Miss
DL	Tonka Hemingway	Gr.	South Carolina
DL	Trey Moore	Jr.	Texas
LB	Anthony Hill Jr.	So.	Texas
LB	Jamon Dumas-Johnson	Sr.	Kentucky
LB	Eugene Asante	Sr.	Auburn
LB	Jihaad Campbell	Jr.	Alabama
DB	Domani Jackson	Jr.	Alabama
DB	Daylen Everette	Jr.	Georgia
DB	Nick Emmanwori	Jr.	South Carolina
DB	Malik Muhammad	So.	Texas
Third Team Special Teams
PK	Alex McPherson	So.	Auburn
P	Brett Thorson	Jr.	Georgia
LS	Slade Roy	Sr.	LSU
KS	Trey Smack	Jr.	Florida
RS	Zavion Thomas	Jr.	LSU
AP	Barion Brown	Jr.	Kentucky

== Head coaches ==
=== Pre-season changes ===
Alabama head coach Nick Saban retired after finishing his 17th season 11-2 (8-0 SEC) with the Crimson Tide and posting a 201–29 overall record with the school. On January 12, 2024, it was announced his replacement was Kalen DeBoer, who had led Washington to a 14–1 record, Sugar Bowl victory, and national championship appearance.

Mississippi State head coach Zach Arnett was fired during the 2023 season, with two games left in the regular season. On November 26, 2023, he was replaced by Jeff Lebby, Oklahoma's offensive coordinator.

Texas A&M head coach Jimbo Fisher was fired during the 2023 season, with two games left in the regular season. On November 27, 2023, he was replaced by Mike Elko, Duke's head coach.

=== Coaches ===
Note: All stats current through the completion of the 2023 season. All records are at Division I schools only

Team	Head coach	Year at school	Overall record	Record at school	SEC record	Conference Championships	National Championships
Alabama	Kalen DeBoer	1	104–12	0–0	0–0	0	0
Arkansas	Sam Pittman	5	23–25	23–25	11–23	0	0
Auburn	Hugh Freeze	2	60–49	6–7	9–26	0	0
Florida	Billy Napier	3	51–26	11–14	6–10	0	0
Georgia	Kirby Smart	9	94–16	94–16	56–9	2	2
Kentucky	Mark Stoops	12	73–65	73–65	33–55	0	0
LSU	Brian Kelly	3	165–68	20–7	12–4	0	0
Mississippi State	Jeff Lebby	1	0–0	0–0	0–0	0	0
Missouri	Eliah Drinkwitz	5	40–22	28–21	17–17	0	0
Oklahoma	Brent Venables	3	16–10	16–10	0–0	0	0
Ole Miss	Lane Kiffin	5	95–49	34–15	20–13	0	0
South Carolina	Shane Beamer	4	20–18	20–18	10–14	0	0
Tennessee	Josh Heupel	4	55–20	27–12	14–10	0	0
Texas	Steve Sarkisian	4	71–49	25–14	0–0	0	0
Texas A&M	Mike Elko	1	16–9	0–0	0–0	0	0
Vanderbilt	Clark Lea	4	9–27	9–27	2–22	0	0

== Rankings ==
		Pre	Wk 1	Wk 2	Wk 3	Wk 4	Wk 5	Wk 6	Wk 7	Wk 8	Wk 9	Wk 10	Wk 11	Wk 12	Wk 13	Wk 14	Wk 15	Final
Alabama	AP	5	4	4	4	4	1 (40)	7	7	15	14	11	9	7	13	11	11	17
Alabama	C	5	4	4	4	4	2 (19)	7	7	15	14	11	9	7	13	11	11	17
Alabama	CFP	Not released										11	10	7	13	11	11	
Arkansas	AP					RV		RV	RV		RV							
Arkansas	C					RV		RV			RV							
Arkansas	CFP	Not released																
Auburn	AP	RV	RV															
Auburn	C	RV	RV															
Auburn	CFP	Not released																
Florida	AP														RV	RV	RV	RV
Florida	C	RV																
Florida	CFP	Not released																
Georgia	AP	1 (46)	1 (57)	1 (54)	2 (23)	2 (13)	5	5	5	2 (2)	2 (1)	2	11	8	6	5	2	6
Georgia	C	1 (46)	1 (51)	1 (50)	1 (42)	1 (35)	5	4	4	2 (2)	2 (1)	2 (1)	10	8	6	5	2	6
Georgia	CFP	Not released										3	12	10	7	5	2	
Kentucky	AP	RV	RV				RV	RV										
Kentucky	C	RV	RV				RV	RV										
Kentucky	CFP	Not released																
LSU	AP	13	18	16	16	14	13	13	8	8	16	14	21	RV	RV	RV	RV	RV
LSU	C	12	19	17	16	13	12	10	8	7	16	13	22	RV	RV		RV	RV
LSU	CFP	Not released										15	22					
Mississippi State	AP																	
Mississippi State	C																	
Mississippi State	CFP	Not released																
Missouri	AP	11	9	6	7	11	9	21	19	21	25	RV	24	RV	24	22	23	22
Missouri	C	11	10	8	8	11	9	18	16	17	23	22	21	RV	24	20	20	20
Missouri	CFP	Not released										24	23	23	21	19	19	
Oklahoma	AP	16	15	15	15	21	19	18т	RV									
Oklahoma	C	16	13	13	13	18	17	16	RV									
Oklahoma	CFP	Not released																
Ole Miss	AP	6	6	5	5	6	12	9	18	18	19	16	10	9	15	15	16	11
Ole Miss	C	6	5	5	5	5	11	8	15	18	18	12	11	9	16	15	15	13
Ole Miss	CFP	Not released										16	11	9	14	13	14	
South Carolina	AP			RV	RV	RV	RV			RV	RV	RV	23	19	16	13	14	19
South Carolina	C	RV		RV		RV	RV					RV	23	19	14	12	14	19
South Carolina	CFP	Not released											21	18	15	14	15	
Tennessee	AP	15	14	7	6	5	4	8	11	7	7	7	6	10	7	6	7	9
Tennessee	C	15	12	9	7	6	4	9	10	8	7	6	4	11	8	6	6	8
Tennessee	CFP	Not released										7	7	11	8	7	7	
Texas	AP	4	3	2 (4)	1 (35)	1 (44)	2 (19)	1 (52)	1 (56)	5	6	5	3	3	3	2	4	4
Texas	C	4 (1)	3 (1)	3 (1)	2 (10)	2 (18)	1 (29)	1 (44)	1 (53)	6	6	5	3	3	3	2	4	3
Texas	CFP	Not released										5	3	3	3	2	3	
Texas A&M	AP	20	RV	RV	25	24	25т	15	14	14	10	15	15	15	20	RV	RV	RV
Texas A&M	C	20	RV	RV	24	24	21	14	14	14	11	16	15	14	19	RV	RV	
Texas A&M	CFP	Not released										14	15	15	20			
Vanderbilt	AP		RV	RV				RV	RV	25	RV	24		RV				
Vanderbilt	C							RV	RV	25	RV	25		RV				
Vanderbilt	CFP	Not released																

Legend
	Improvement in ranking
	Drop in ranking
	No change in ranking from previous week
RV	Received votes but were not ranked in Top 25 of poll
т	Tied with team above or below also with this symbol

== Schedules ==
The schedule was released on December 14, 2023.The season will begin on August 29, 2025, and will end with the SEC Championship Game on December 6, 2025.

Index to colors and formatting
SEC member won
SEC member lost
SEC teams in **bold**

All times Central time.

† denotes Homecoming game

Rankings reflect those of the AP poll for weeks 1 through 8. Rankings from Week 9 until the end of the Season reflect those of the College Football Playoff Rankings.

=== Week One ===
Date	Time	Visiting team	Home team	Site	TV	Result	Attendance	Ref.
August 29	7:30 p.m.	Arkansas–Pine Bluff	**Arkansas**	War Memorial Stadium • Little Rock, AR	ESPNU	**W** 70–0	40,127	
August 29	8:00 p.m.	Murray State	No. 11 **Missouri**	Faurot Field • Columbia, MO	SECN	**W** 51–0	62,621	
August 30	7:00 p.m.	Temple	No. 16 **Oklahoma**	Gaylord Family Oklahoma Memorial Stadium • Norman, OK	ESPN	**W** 51–3	83,329	
August 31	12:00 p.m.	No. 14 Clemson	No. 1 **Georgia**	Mercedes-Benz Stadium • Atlanta, GA (Aflac Kickoff Game/rivalry)	ABC	**W** 34–3	78,827	
August 31	12:00 p.m.	Virginia Tech	**Vanderbilt**	FirstBank Stadium • Nashville, TN	ESPN	**W** 34–27 ^{OT}	28,934	
August 31	12:45 p.m.	No. 9 (FCS) Chattanooga	No. 15 **Tennessee**	Neyland Stadium • Knoxville, TN	SECN	**W** 69–3	101,915	
August 31	3:30 p.m.	No. 19 Miami	**Florida**	Ben Hill Griffin Stadium • Gainesville, FL (rivalry)	ABC	**L** 17–41	90,544	
August 31	3:30 p.m.	Colorado State	No. 4 **Texas**	Darrell K Royal–Texas Memorial Stadium • Austin, TX	ESPN	**W** 52–0	99,171	
August 31	4:15 p.m.	Old Dominion	**South Carolina**	Williams–Brice Stadium • Columbia, SC	SECN	**W** 23–19	78,496	
August 31	6:00 p.m.	Eastern Kentucky	**Mississippi State**	Davis Wade Stadium • Starkville, MS	ESPN+/SECN+	**W** 56–7	48,724	
August 31	7:00 p.m.	Western Kentucky	No. 5 **Alabama**	Bryant–Denny Stadium • Tuscaloosa, AL	ESPN	**W** 63–0	100,077	
August 31	7:00 p.m.	No. 12 (FCS) Furman	No. 6 **Ole Miss**	Vaught–Hemingway Stadium • Oxford, MS	ESPN+/SECN+	**W** 76–0	66,105	
August 31	7:30 p.m.	No. 7 Notre Dame	No. 20 **Texas A&M**	Kyle Field • College Station, TX	ABC	**L** 13–23	107,315	
August 31	7:30 p.m.	Alabama A&M	**Auburn**	Jordan-Hare Stadium • Auburn, AL	ESPN+/SECN+	**W** 73–3	88,043	
August 31	7:45 p.m.	Southern Miss	**Kentucky**	Kroger Field • Lexington, KY	SECN	**W** 31–0	61,627	
September 1	7:30 p.m.	No. 23 USC	No. 13 **LSU**	Allegiant Stadium • Las Vegas, NV (Vegas Kickoff Classic)	ABC	**L** 20–27	63,969	
^{#}Rankings from AP Poll. All times are in Eastern Time.

=== Week Two ===
Date	Time	Visiting team	Home team	Site	TV	Result	Attendance	Ref.
September 7	12:00 p.m.	**Arkansas**	No. 16 Oklahoma State	Boone Pickens Stadium • Stillwater, OK	ABC	**L** 31–39 ^{2OT}	52,202	
September 7	12:00 p.m.	No. 3 **Texas**	No. 10 Michigan	Michigan Stadium • Ann Arbor, MI	FOX	**W** 31–12	111,170	
September 7	12:45 p.m.	McNeese	**Texas A&M**	Kyle Field • College Station, TX	SECN	**W** 52–10	92,345	
September 7	2:00 p.m.	Tennessee Tech	No. 1 **Georgia**	Sanford Stadium • Athens, GA	ESPN+/SECN+	**W** 48–3	93,033	
September 7	3:30 p.m.	California	**Auburn**	Jordan Hare Stadium • Auburn, AL	ESPN2	**L** 14–21	88,043	
September 7	3:30 p.m.	**South Carolina**	**Kentucky**	Kroger Field • Lexington, KY	ABC	**SC** 31–6	61,349	
September 7	4:15 p.m.	Middle Tennessee	No. 6 **Ole Miss**	Vaught–Hemingway Stadium • Oxford, MS	SECN	**W** 52–3	66,427	
September 7	7:00 p.m.	South Florida	No. 4 **Alabama**	Bryant–Denny Stadium • Tuscaloosa, AL	ESPN	**W** 42–16	100,077	
September 7	7:00 p.m.	Samford	**Florida**	Ben Hill Griffin Stadium • Gainesville, FL	ESPN+/SECN+	**W** 45–7	89,295	
September 7	7:00 p.m.	Buffalo	No. 9 **Missouri**	Faurot Field • Columbia, MO	ESPN+/SECN+	**W** 38–0	62,621	
September 7	7:30 p.m.	No. 14 **Tennessee**	No. 24 NC State	Bank of America Stadium • Charlotte, NC (Duke's Mayo Classic)	ABC	**W** 51–10	72,730	
September 7	7:30 p.m.	No. 22 (FCS) Nicholls	No. 18 **LSU**	Tiger Stadium • Baton Rouge, LA	ESPN+/SECN+	**W** 44–21	100,242	
September 7	7:30 p.m.	Alcorn State	**Vanderbilt**	FirstBank Stadium • Nashville, TN	ESPNU	**W** 55–0	24,080	
September 7	7:45 p.m.	Houston	No. 15 **Oklahoma**	Gaylord Family Oklahoma Memorial Stadium • Norman, OK	SECN	**W** 16–12	83,653	
September 7	10:30 p.m.	**Mississippi State**	Arizona State	Mountain America Stadium • Tempe, AZ	ESPN	**L** 23–30	45,504	
^{#}Rankings from AP Poll. All times are in Eastern Time.

=== Week Three ===
Date	Time	Visiting team	Home team	Site	TV	Result	Attendance	Ref.
September 14	12:00 p.m.	No. 4 **Alabama**	Wisconsin	Camp Randall Stadium • Madison, WI (Big Noon Kickoff)	FOX	**W** 42–10	76,323	
September 14	12:00 p.m.	No. 16 **LSU**	**South Carolina**	Williams–Brice Stadium • Columbia, SC (College GameDay)	ABC	**LSU** 36–33	79,531	
September 14	12:45 p.m.	No. 24 Boston College	No. 6 **Missouri**	Faurot Field • Columbia, MO	SECN	**W** 27–21	62,621	
September 14	3:30 p.m.	**Texas A&M**	**Florida**	Ben Hill Griffin Stadium • Gainesville, FL	ABC	**TA&M** 33–20	89,993	
September 14	3:30 p.m.	Tulane	No. 15 **Oklahoma**	Gaylord Family Oklahoma Memorial Stadium • Norman, OK	ESPN	**W** 34–19	83,325	
September 14	4:15 p.m.	UAB	**Arkansas**	Donald W. Reynolds Razorback Stadium • Fayetteville, AR	SECN	**W** 37–27	75,021	
September 14	6:30 p.m.	No. 5 **Ole Miss**	Wake Forest	Allegacy Federal Credit Union Stadium • Winston-Salem, NC	The CW	**W** 40–6	32,849	
September 14	7:00 p.m.	UTSA	No. 2 **Texas**	Darrell K Royal–Texas Memorial Stadium • Austin, TX	ESPN	**W** 56–7	101,892	
September 14	7:00 p.m.	**Vanderbilt**	Georgia State	Center Parc Stadium • Atlanta, GA	ESPN+	**L** 32–36	14,413	
September 14	7:30 p.m.	No. 1 **Georgia**	**Kentucky**	Kroger Field • Lexington, KY	ABC	**UGA** 13–12	61,663	
September 14	7:30 p.m.	New Mexico	**Auburn**	Jordan Hare Stadium • Auburn, AL	ESPN2	**W** 45–19	88,043	
September 14	7:30 p.m.	Toledo	**Mississippi State**	Davis Wade Stadium • Starkville, MS	ESPNU	**L** 17–41	47,412	
September 14	7:45 p.m.	Kent State	No. 7 **Tennessee**	Neyland Stadium • Knoxville, TN	SECN	**W** 71–0	101,915	
^{#}Rankings from AP Poll. All times are in Eastern Time.

=== Week Four ===
Date	Time	Visiting team	Home team	Site	TV	Result	Attendance	Ref.
September 21	12:00 p.m.	**Florida**	**Mississippi State**	Davis Wade Stadium • Starkville, MS	ESPN	**FLA** 45–28	49,655	
September 21	12:45 p.m.	Ohio	**Kentucky**	Kroger Field • Lexington, KY	SECN	**W** 41–6	61,783	
September 21	3:30 p.m.	**Arkansas**	**Auburn**	Jordan–Hare Stadium • Auburn, AL	ESPN	**ARK** 24–14	88,043	
September 21	3:30 p.m.	UCLA	No. 16 **LSU**	Tiger Stadium • Baton Rouge, LA	ABC	**W** 34–17	100,315	
September 21	4:15 p.m.	**Vanderbilt**	No. 7 **Missouri**	Faurot Field • Columbia, MO	SECN	**MIZ** 30–27 ^{OT}	62,621	
September 21	7:30 p.m.	No. 6 **Tennessee**	No. 15 **Oklahoma**	Gaylord Family Oklahoma Memorial Stadium • Norman, OK (College GameDay)	ABC	**TENN** 25–15	84,701	
September 21	7:30 p.m.	Akron	**South Carolina**	Williams–Brice Stadium • Columbia, SC	ESPNU	**W** 50–7	78,704	
September 21	7:30 p.m.	Bowling Green	No. 25 **Texas A&M**	Kyle Field • College Station, TX	ESPN+/SECN+	**W** 26–20	99,523	
September 21	7:45 p.m.	Georgia Southern	No. 5 **Ole Miss**	Vaught–Hemingway Stadium • Oxford, MS	SECN	**W** 52–13	67,505	
September 21	8:00 p.m.	UL Monroe	No. 1 **Texas**	Darrell K Royal–Texas Memorial Stadium • Austin, TX	ESPN+/SECN+	**W** 51–3	102,850	
^{#}Rankings from AP Poll. All times are in Eastern Time.

Date	Bye Week	
September 21	No. 4 **Alabama**	No. 2 **Georgia**

=== Week Five ===
Date	Time	Visiting team	Home team	Site	TV	Result	Attendance	Ref.
September 28	12:00 p.m.	**Kentucky**	No. 6 **Ole Miss**	Vaught–Hemingway Stadium • Oxford, MS	ABC	**UK** 20–17	67,616	
September 28	3:30 p.m.	No. 21 **Oklahoma**	**Auburn**	Jordan–Hare Stadium • Auburn, AL	ABC	**OU** 27–21	88,044	
September 28	3:30 p.m.	**Arkansas**	No. 24 **Texas A&M**	AT&T Stadium • Arlington, TX (Southwest Classic)	ESPN	**TAMU** 21–17	60,928	
September 28	4:15 p.m.	**Mississippi State**	No. 1 **Texas**	Darrell K Royal–Texas Memorial Stadium • Austin, TX	SECN	**TEX** 35–13	101,388	
September 28	7:30 p.m.	No. 2 **Georgia**	No. 4 **Alabama**	Bryant–Denny Stadium • Tuscaloosa, AL (rivalry)	ABC	**ALA** 41–34	100,077	
September 28	7:45 p.m.	South Alabama	No. 14 **LSU**	Tiger Stadium • Baton Rouge, LA	SECN	**W** 42–10	102,143	
^{#}Rankings from AP Poll. All times are in Eastern Time.

Date	Bye Week				
September 28	**Florida**	No. 11 **Missouri**	**South Carolina**	No. 5 **Tennessee**	**Vanderbilt**

=== Week Six ===
Date	Time	Visiting team	Home team	Site	TV	Result	Attendance	Ref.
October 5	12:00 p.m.	No. 9 **Missouri**	No. 25 **Texas A&M**	Kyle Field • College Station, TX	ABC	**TAMU** 41–10	97,049	
October 5	3:30 p.m.	**Auburn**	No. 5 **Georgia**	Sanford Stadium • Athens, GA (Deep South's Oldest Rivalry)	ABC	**UGA** 31–13	93,033	
October 5	3:30 p.m.	No. 12 **Ole Miss**	**South Carolina**	Williams–Brice Stadium • Columbia, SC	ESPN	**MISS** 27–3	79,837	
October 5	4:15 p.m.	No. 1 **Alabama**	**Vanderbilt**	FirstBank Stadium • Nashville, TN	SECN	**VAN** 40–35	28,934	
October 5	7:30 p.m.	No. 4 **Tennessee**	**Arkansas**	Donald W. Reynolds Razorback Stadium • Fayetteville, AR	ABC	**ARK** 19–14	75,573	
October 5	7:45 p.m.	UCF	**Florida**	Ben Hill Griffin Stadium • Gainesville, FL	SECN	**W** 24–13	90,369	
^{#}Rankings from AP Poll. All times are in Eastern Time.

Date	Bye Week				
October 5	**Kentucky**	No. 13 **LSU**	**Mississippi State**	No. 19 **Oklahoma**	No. 2 **Texas**

=== Week Seven ===
Date	Time	Visiting team	Home team	Site	TV	Result	Attendance	Ref.
October 12	12:00 p.m.	**South Carolina**	No. 7 **Alabama**	Bryant–Denny Stadium • Tuscaloosa, AL	ABC	**ALA** 27–25	100,077	
October 12	12:00 p.m.	No. 21 **Missouri**	UMass	Warren McGuirk Alumni Stadium • Hadley, MA	ESPN2	**W** 45–3	16,102	
October 12	3:30 p.m.	No. 18 **Oklahoma**	No. 1 **Texas**	Cotton Bowl • Dallas, TX (Red River Showdown)	ABC	**TEX** 34–3	92,100	
October 12	4:15 p.m.	**Mississippi State**	No. 5 **Georgia**	Sanford Stadium • Athens, GA	SECN	**UGA** 41–31	93,033	
October 12	7:00 p.m.	**Florida**	No. 8 **Tennessee**	Neyland Stadium • Knoxville, TN (rivalry)	ESPN	**TENN** 23–17 ^{OT}	101,915	
October 12	7:30 p.m.	No. 9 **Ole Miss**	No. 13 **LSU**	Tiger Stadium • Baton Rouge, LA (Magnolia Bowl)	ABC	**LSU** 29–26 ^{OT}	102,212	
October 12	7:45 p.m.	**Vanderbilt**	**Kentucky**	Kroger Field • Lexington, KY (rivalry)	SECN	**VAN** 20–13	62,120	
^{#}Rankings from AP Poll. All times are in Eastern Time.

Date	Bye Week		
October 12	**Arkansas**	**Auburn**	No. 15 **Texas A&M**

=== Week Eight ===
Date	Time	Visiting team	Home team	Site	TV	Result	Attendance	Ref.
October 19	12:00 p.m.	**Auburn**	No. 19 **Missouri**	Faurot Field • Columbia, MO	ESPN	**MIZ** 21–17	62,621	
October 19	12:45 p.m.	**South Carolina**	**Oklahoma**	Gaylord Family Oklahoma Memorial Stadium • Norman, OK	SECN	**SC** 35–9	83,331	
October 19	3:30 p.m.	No. 7 **Alabama**	No. 11 **Tennessee**	Neyland Stadium • Knoxville, TN (Third Saturday in October)	ABC	**TENN** 24–17	101,915	
October 19	4:15 p.m.	No. 14 **Texas A&M**	**Mississippi State**	Davis Wade Stadium • Starkville, MS	SECN	**TAMU** 34–24	50,127	
October 19	7:00 p.m.	No. 8 **LSU**	**Arkansas**	Donald W. Reynolds Razorback Stadium • Fayetteville, AR (rivalry)	ESPN	**LSU** 34–10	75,893	
October 19	7:00 p.m.	Ball State	**Vanderbilt**	FirstBank Stadium • Nashville, TN	ESPN+/SECN+	**W** 24–14	27,884	
October 19	7:30 p.m.	No. 5 **Georgia**	No. 1 **Texas**	Darrell K Royal–Texas Memorial Stadium • Austin, TX (College GameDay)	ABC	**UGA** 30–15	105,215	
October 19	7:45 p.m.	**Kentucky**	**Florida**	Ben Hill Griffin Stadium • Gainesville, FL (rivalry)	SECN	**FLA** 48–20	89,906	
^{#}Rankings from AP Poll. All times are in Eastern Time.

Date	Bye Week
October 19	No. 18 **Ole Miss**

=== Week Nine ===
Date	Time	Visiting team	Home team	Site	TV	Result	Attendance	Ref.
October 26	12:00 p.m.	**Oklahoma**	No. 18 **Ole Miss**	Vaught–Hemingway Stadium • Oxford, MS	ESPN	**MISS** 26–14	67,926	
October 26	12:45 p.m.	**Arkansas**	**Mississippi State**	Davis Wade Stadium • Starkville, MS	SECN	**ARK** 58–25	49,303	
October 26	3:30 p.m.	No. 21 **Missouri**	No. 15 **Alabama**	Bryant–Denny Stadium • Tuscaloosa, AL	ABC	**ALA** 34–0	100,077	
October 26	4:15 p.m.	No. 5 **Texas**	No. 25 **Vanderbilt**	FirstBank Stadium • Nashville, TN	SECN	**TEX** 27–24	28,934	
October 26	7:30 p.m.	No. 8 **LSU**	No. 14 **Texas A&M**	Kyle Field • College Station, TX (rivalry)	ABC	**TAMU** 38–23	108,852	
October 26	7:45 p.m.	**Auburn**	**Kentucky**	Kroger Field • Lexington, KY	SECN	**AUB** 24–10	60,605	
^{#}Rankings from AP Poll. All times are in Eastern Time.

Date	Bye Week			
October 26	**Florida**	No. 2 **Georgia**	**South Carolina**	No. 7 **Tennessee**

=== Week Ten ===
Date	Time	Visiting team	Home team	Site	TV	Result	Attendance	Ref.
November 2	12:00 p.m.	No. 19 **Ole Miss**	**Arkansas**	Donald W. Reynolds Razorback Stadium • Fayetteville, AR	ESPN	**MISS** 63–31	72,894	
November 2	12:45 p.m.	**Vanderbilt**	**Auburn**	Jordan–Hare Stadium • Auburn, AL	SECN	**VAN** 17–7	88,043	
November 2	2:30 p.m.	Maine	**Oklahoma**	Gaylord Family Oklahoma Memorial Stadium • Norman, OK	ESPN+/SECN+	**W** 59–14	82,831	
November 2	3:30 p.m.	No. 2 **Georgia**	**Florida**	EverBank Stadium • Jacksonville, FL (rivalry)	ABC	**UGA** 34–20	76,307	
November 2	4:15 p.m.	UMass	**Mississippi State**	Davis Wade Stadium • Starkville, MS	SECN	**W** 45–20	48,617	
November 2	7:30 p.m.	No. 10 **Texas A&M**	**South Carolina**	Williams–Brice Stadium • Columbia, SC	ABC	**SC** 44–20	80,298	
November 2	7:45 p.m.	**Kentucky**	No. 7 **Tennessee**	Neyland Stadium • Knoxville, TN (rivalry)	SECN	**TENN** 28–18	101,915	
^{#}Rankings from AP Poll. All times are in Eastern Time.

Date	Bye Week			
November 2	No. 14 **Alabama**	No. 16 **LSU**	No. 25 **Missouri**	No. 6 **Texas**

=== Week Eleven ===
Date	Time	Visiting team	Home team	Site	TV	Result	Attendance	Ref.
November 9	12:00 p.m.	**Florida**	No. 5 **Texas**	Darrell K Royal–Texas Memorial Stadium • Austin, TX	ABC	**TEX** 49–17	103,375	
November 9	3:30 p.m.	No. 3 **Georgia**	No. 16 **Ole Miss**	Vaught–Hemingway Stadium • Oxford, MS	ABC	**MISS** 28–10	68,126	
November 9	4:15 p.m.	**South Carolina**	**Vanderbilt**	FirstBank Stadium • Nashville, TN	SECN	**SC** 28–7	28,934	
November 9	7:00 p.m.	**Mississippi State**	No. 7 **Tennessee**	Neyland Stadium • Knoxville, TN	ESPN	**TENN** 33–14	101,915	
November 9	7:30 p.m.	No. 11 **Alabama**	No. 15 **LSU**	Tiger Stadium • Baton Rouge, LA (First Saturday in November/College GameDay)	ABC	**ALA** 42–13	102,283	
November 9	7:45 p.m.	**Oklahoma**	No. 24 **Missouri**	Faurot Field • Columbia, MO (rivalry)	SECN	**MIZ** 30–23	62,621	
^{#}Rankings from College Football Playoff. All times are in Eastern Time.

Date	Bye Week			
November 9	**Arkansas**	**Auburn**	**Kentucky**	No. 14 **Texas A&M**

=== Week Twelve ===
Date	Time	Visiting team	Home team	Site	TV	Result	Attendance	Ref.
November 16	12:00 p.m.	No. 3 **Texas**	**Arkansas**	Donald W. Reynolds Razorback Stadium • Fayetteville, AR (rivalry)	ABC	**TEX** 20–10	74,929	
November 16	12:45 p.m.	UL Monroe	**Auburn**	Jordan–Hare Stadium • Auburn, AL	SECN	**W** 48–14	88,043	
November 16	1:30 p.m.	Murray State	**Kentucky**	Kroger Field • Lexington, KY	ESPN+/SECN+	**W** 48–6	48,370	
November 16	2:00 p.m.	Mercer	No. 10 **Alabama**	Bryant–Denny Stadium • Tuscaloosa, AL	ESPN+/SECN+	**W** 52–7	100,077	
November 16	3:30 p.m.	No. 22 **LSU**	**Florida**	Ben Hill Griffin Stadium • Gainesville, FL (rivalry)	ABC	**FLA** 27–16	90,067	
November 16	4:15 p.m.	No. 23 **Missouri**	No. 21 **South Carolina**	Williams–Brice Stadium • Columbia, SC	SECN	**SC** 34–30	79,361	
November 16	7:30 p.m.	No. 7 **Tennessee**	No. 12 **Georgia**	Sanford Stadium • Athens, GA (rivalry)	ABC	**UGA** 31–17	93,033	
November 16	7:45 p.m.	New Mexico State	No. 15 **Texas A&M**	Kyle Field • College Station, TX	SECN	**W** 38–3	105,815	
^{#}Rankings from College Football Playoff. All times are in Eastern Time.

Date	Bye Week			
November 16	No. 11 **Ole Miss**	**Mississippi State**	**Oklahoma**	**Vanderbilt**

=== Week Thirteen ===
Date	Time	Visiting team	Home team	Site	TV	Result	Attendance	Ref.
November 23	12:00 p.m.	No. 9 **Ole Miss**	**Florida**	Ben Hill Griffin Stadium • Gainesville, FL	ABC	**FLA** 24–17	89,942	
November 23	12:45 p.m.	UMass	No. 10 **Georgia**	Sanford Stadium • Athens, GA	SECN	**W** 59–21	93,033	
November 23	1:00 p.m.	UTEP	No. 11 **Tennessee**	Neyland Stadium • Knoxville, TN	ESPN+/SECN+	**W** 56–0	101,915	
November 23	3:30 p.m.	**Kentucky**	No. 3 **Texas**	Darrell K Royal–Texas Memorial Stadium • Austin, TX	ABC	**TEX** 31–14	102,811	
November 23	4:00 p.m.	Wofford	No. 18 **South Carolina**	Williams–Brice Stadium • Columbia, SC	ESPN+/SECN+	**W** 56–12	79,078	
November 23	4:00 p.m.	Louisiana Tech	**Arkansas**	Donald W. Reynolds Razorback Stadium • Fayetteville, AR	ESPN+/SECN+	**W** 35–14	66,041	
November 23	4:15 p.m.	No. 23 **Missouri**	**Mississippi State**	Davis Wade Stadium • Starkville, MS	SECN	**MIZ** 39–20	47,824	
November 23	7:30 p.m.	No. 7 **Alabama**	**Oklahoma**	Gaylord Family Oklahoma Memorial Stadium • Norman, OK	ABC	**OU** 24–3	84,053	
November 23	7:30 p.m.	No. 15 **Texas A&M**	**Auburn**	Jordan–Hare Stadium • Auburn, AL	ESPN	**AUB** 43–41 ^{4OT}	88,043	
November 23	7:45 p.m.	**Vanderbilt**	**LSU**	Tiger Stadium • Baton Rouge, LA	SECN	**LSU** 24–17	102,086	
^{#}Rankings from College Football Playoff. All times are in Eastern Time.

=== Week Fourteen ===
Date	Time	Visiting team	Home team	Site	TV	Result	Attendance	Ref.
November 29	3:30 p.m.	**Mississippi State**	No. 14 **Ole Miss**	Vaught–Hemingway Stadium • Oxford, MS (Egg Bowl)	ABC	**MISS** 26–14	67,896	
November 29	7:30 p.m.	Georgia Tech	No. 7 **Georgia**	Sanford Stadium • Athens, GA (Clean, Old-Fashioned Hate)	ABC	**W** 44–42 ^{8OT}	93,033	
November 30	12:00 p.m.	No. 8 **Tennessee**	**Vanderbilt**	FirstBank Stadium • Nashville, TN (rivalry)	ABC	**TENN** 36–23	28,934	
November 30	12:00 p.m.	No. 15 **South Carolina**	No. 12 Clemson	Memorial Stadium • Clemson, SC (Palmetto Bowl)	ESPN	**W** 17–14	81,500	
November 30	12:00 p.m.	Louisville	**Kentucky**	Kroger Field • Lexington, KY (Governor's Cup)	SECN	**L** 14–41	58,612	
November 30	3:30 p.m.	**Auburn**	No. 13 **Alabama**	Bryant–Denny Stadium • Tuscaloosa, AL (Iron Bowl)	ABC	**ALA** 28–14	100,077	
November 30	3:30 p.m.	**Arkansas**	No. 21 **Missouri**	Faurot Field • Columbia, MO (Battle Line Rivalry)	SECN	**MIZ** 28–21	62,621	
November 30	7:00 p.m.	**Oklahoma**	**LSU**	Tiger Stadium • Baton Rouge, LA	ESPN	**LSU** 37–17	99,364	
November 30	7:00 p.m.	**Florida**	Florida State	Doak Campbell Stadium • Tallahassee, FL (Sunshine Showdown)	ESPN2	**W** 31–11	55,107	
November 30	7:30 p.m.	No. 3 **Texas**	No. 20 **Texas A&M**	Kyle Field • College Station, TX (Lone Star Showdown)	ABC	**TEX** 17–7	109,028	
^{#}Rankings from College Football Playoff. All times are in Eastern Time.

=== SEC Championship Game ===
Date	Time	Visiting team	Home team	Site	TV	Result	Attendance	Ref.
December 7	4:00 p.m.	No. 5 **Georgia**	No. 2 **Texas**	Mercedes-Benz Stadium • Atlanta, GA	ABC	**UGA** 22–19 ^{OT}	74,916	
^{#}Rankings from College Football Playoff. All times are in Eastern Time.

== Postseason ==
=== Bowl games ===
For the 2020–2025 bowl cycle, The SEC will have annually eight appearances in the following bowls: Sugar Bowl and Peach Bowl (unless they are selected for playoffs filled by a SEC and at-large team if champion is in the playoffs), Citrus Bowl, Duke's Mayo Bowl, Gator Bowl, Liberty Bowl, Music City Bowl, ReliaQuest Bowl and Texas Bowl. The SEC teams will go to a New Year's Six bowl if a team finishes higher than the champions of Power Five conferences in the final College Football Playoff rankings.

The SEC champion are also eligible for the College Football Playoff if they're among the top five conference champions in the final CFP ranking or if they are seven highest-ranked at-large selections. Additionally, four of the top five conference champions will receive first round byes for the 2024 College Football Playoff.

Legend
SEC win
SEC loss

Bowl game	Date	Site	Time (EST)	Television	SEC team	Opponent	Score	Attendance
Gasparilla Bowl	December 20, 2024	Raymond James Stadium • Tampa, FL	3:30 p.m.	ESPN	Florida	Tulane	W 33–8	41,472
Armed Forces Bowl	December 27, 2024	Amon G. Carter Stadium • Fort Worth, TX	12:00 p.m.	ESPN	Oklahoma	Navy	L 20–21	50,754
Birmingham Bowl	December 27, 2024	Protective Stadium • Birmingham, AL	3:30 p.m.	ESPN	Vanderbilt	Georgia Tech	W 35–27	33,840
Liberty Bowl	December 27, 2024	Simmons Bank Liberty Stadium • Memphis, TN	7:00 p.m.	ESPN	Arkansas	Texas Tech	W 39–26	37,764
Las Vegas Bowl	December 27, 2024	Allegiant Stadium • Paradise, NV	10:30 p.m.	ESPN	Texas A&M	USC	L 31–35	26,671
Music City Bowl	December 30, 2024	Nissan Stadium • Nashville, TN	2:30 p.m.	ESPN	No. 19 Missouri	Iowa	W 27–24	43,375
ReliaQuest Bowl	December 31, 2024	Raymond James Stadium • Tampa, FL	12:00 p.m.	ESPN	No. 11 Alabama	Michigan	L 13–19	51,439
Citrus Bowl	December 31, 2024	Camping World Stadium • Orlando, FL	3:00 p.m.	ABC	No. 15 South Carolina	No. 20 Illinois	L 17–21	47,129
Texas Bowl	December 31, 2024	NRG Stadium • Houston, TX	3:30 p.m.	ESPN	LSU	Baylor	W 44–31	59,940
Gator Bowl	January 2, 2025	EverBank Stadium • Jacksonville, FL	8:00 p.m.	ESPN	No. 14 Ole Miss	Duke	W 52–20	31,290
College Football Playoff bowl games
College Football Playoff	December 21, 2024	Darrell K Royal-Texas Memorial Stadium • Austin, TX	4:00 p.m.	TNT	No. 3 Texas	No. 16 Clemson	W 38–24	101,150
College Football Playoff	December 21, 2024	Ohio Stadium • Columbus, OH	8:00 p.m.	ABC	No. 7 Tennessee	No. 6 Ohio State	L 17–42	102,870
Peach Bowl	January 1, 2025	Mercedes-Benz Stadium • Atlanta, GA	1:00 p.m.	ESPN	No. 3 Texas	No. 12 Arizona State	W 39–31 ^{2OT}	71,105
Sugar Bowl	January 2, 2025	Caesars Superdome • New Orleans, LA	4:00 p.m.	ESPN	No. 2 Georgia	No. 5 Notre Dame	L 10–23	57,267
Cotton Bowl Classic	January 10, 2025	AT&T Stadium • Arlington, TX	7:30 p.m.	ESPN	No. 3 Texas	No. 6 Ohio State	L 14–28	74,527

== Head to head matchups ==
2024 SEC Head to head matchups
Team	Alabama	Arkansas	Auburn	Florida	Georgia	Kentucky	LSU	Missouri	Mississippi State	Oklahoma	Ole Miss	South Carolina	Tennessee	Texas	Texas A&M	Vanderbilt
vs. Alabama	—	×	14–28	×	34–41	×	13–42	0–34	×	24–3	×	25–27	24–17	×	×	40–35
vs. Arkansas	×	—	14–24	×	×	×	34–10	28–21	25–58	×	63–31	×	14–19	20–10	21–17	×
vs. Auburn	28–14	24–14	—	×	31–13	10–24	×	21–17	×	27–21	×	×	×	×	41–43	17–7
vs. Florida	×	×	×	—	34–20	20–48	16–27	×	28–45	×	17–24	×	23–17	49–17	33–20	×
vs. Georgia	41–34	×	13–31	20–34	—	12–13	×	×	31–41	×	28–10	×	17–31	15–30	×	×
vs. Kentucky	×	×	24–10	48–20	13–12	—	×	×	×	×	17–20	31–6	28–18	31–14	×	20–13
vs. LSU	42–13	10–34	×	27–16	×	×	—	×	×	17–37	26–29	33–36	×	×	38–23	17–24
vs. Missouri	34–0	21–28	17–21	×	×	×	×	—	20–39	23–30	×	34–30	×	×	41–10	27–30
vs. Mississippi State	×	58–25	×	45–28	41–31	×	×	39–20	—	×	26–14	×	33–14	35–13	34–24	×
vs. Oklahoma	3–24	×	21–27	×	×	×	37–17	30–23	×	—	26–14	35–9	25–15	34–3	×	×
vs. Ole Miss	×	31–63	×	24–17	10–28	20–17	29–26	×	14–26	14–26	—	3–27	×	×	×	×
vs. South Carolina	27–25	×	×	×	×	6–31	36–33	30–34	×	9–35	27–3	—	×	×	20–44	7–28
vs. Tennessee	17–24	19–14	×	17–23	31–17	18–28	×	×	14–33	15–25	×	×	—	×	×	23–36
vs. Texas	×	10–20	×	17–49	30–15	14–31	×	×	13–35	3–34	×	×	×	—	7–17	24–27
vs. Texas A&M	×	17–21	43–41	20–33	×	×	23–38	10–41	24–34	×	×	44–20	×	17–7	—	×
vs. Vanderbilt	35–40	×	7–17	×	×	13–20	24–17	30–27	×	×	×	28–7	36–23	27–24	×	—
Total	5–3	3–5	2–6	4–4	6–2	1–7	5–3	5–3	0–8	2–6	5–3	5–3	6–2	7–1	5–3	3–5
	ALA	ARK	AUB	FLA	UGA	UK	LSU	MIZ	MSST	OU	MISS	SC	TENN	TEX	TAMU	VAN

× – Matchup not played in 2024
Updated after the season.

== SEC vs other conferences ==
=== SEC vs Power Four matchups ===
The following games include SEC teams competing against Power Four teams from the ACC, Big Ten, Big 12, and Notre Dame. All rankings are from the AP Poll at the time of the game.

Date	Conference	Visitor	Home	Site	Score
August 31	ACC	19 Miami (FL)	Florida	Ben Hill Griffin Stadium • Gainesville, FL	L 17–41
August 31	ACC	14 Clemson	1 Georgia†	Mercedes-Benz Stadium • Atlanta, GA	W 34–3
August 31	-	7 Notre Dame	20 Texas A&M	Kyle Field • College Station, TX	L 13–23
August 31	ACC	Virginia Tech	Vanderbilt	FirstBank Stadium • Nashville, TN	W 34–27 ^{OT}
September 1	Big Ten	13 LSU	23 USC†	Allegiant Stadium • Las Vegas, NV (Vegas Kickoff Classic)	L 20–27
September 7	Big 12	Arkansas	16 Oklahoma State	Boone Pickens Stadium • Stillwater, OK	L 31–39 ^{2OT}
September 7	Big 12	Mississippi State	Arizona State	Mountain America Stadium • Tempe, AZ	L 23–30
September 7	Big 12	Houston	15 Oklahoma	Gaylord Family Oklahoma Memorial Stadium • Norman, OK	W 16–12
September 7	ACC	14 Tennessee	24 NC State	Bank of America Stadium • Charlotte, NC (Duke's Mayo Classic)	W 51–10
September 7	Big Ten	3 Texas	10 Michigan	Michigan Stadium • Ann Arbor, MI	W 31–12
September 7	ACC	California	Auburn	Jordan Hare Stadium • Auburn, AL	L 14–21
September 14	Big Ten	4 Alabama	Wisconsin	Camp Randall Stadium • Madison, WI	W 42–10
September 14	ACC	5 Ole Miss	Wake Forest	Allegacy Federal Credit Union Stadium • Winston-Salem, NC	W 40–6
September 14	ACC	24 Boston College	6 Missouri	Faurot Field • Columbia, MO	W 27–21
September 21	Big Ten	UCLA	16 LSU	Tiger Stadium • Baton Rouge, LA	W 34–17
October 5	Big 12	UCF	Florida	Ben Hill Griffin Stadium • Gainesville, FL	W 24–13
November 29	ACC	Georgia Tech	7 Georgia	Sanford Stadium • Athens, GA	W 44–42^{8OT}
November 30	ACC	Louisville	Kentucky	Kroger Field • Lexington, KY	L 14–41
November 30	ACC	15 South Carolina	12 Clemson	Memorial Stadium • Clemson, SC	W 17–14
November 30	ACC	Florida	Florida State	Doak Campbell Stadium • Tallahassee, FL	W 31–11

Note:† Denotes Neutral Site Game

Updated through Week 14.

=== SEC vs Group of Five matchups ===
The following games include SEC teams competing against "Group of Five" teams from the American, C-USA, MAC, Mountain West and Sun Belt.

Date	Conference	Visitor	Home	Site	Score
August 30	AAC	Temple	16 Oklahoma	Gaylord Family Oklahoma Stadium • Norman, OK	W 51–3
August 31	CUSA	Western Kentucky	5 Alabama	Bryant-Denny Stadium • Tuscaloosa, AL	W 63–0
August 31	Sun Belt	Southern Miss	Kentucky	Kroger Field • Lexington, KY	W 31–0
August 31	Sun Belt	Old Dominion	South Carolina	Williams-Brice Stadium • Columbia, SC	W 23–19
August 31	Mountain West	Colorado State	4 Texas	Darrell K Royal-Texas Memorial Stadium • Austin, TX	W 52–0
September 7	AAC	South Florida	4 Alabama	Bryant-Denny Stadium • Tuscaloosa, AL	W 42–16
September 7	CUSA	Middle Tennessee	6 Ole Miss	Vaught-Hemingway Stadium • Oxford, MS	W 52–3
September 7	MAC	Buffalo	9 Missouri	Farout Field • Columbia, MO	W 38–0
September 14	AAC	UAB	Arkansas	Donald W. Reynolds Razorback Stadium • Fayetteville, AR	W 37–27
September 14	Mountain West	New Mexico	Auburn	Jordan Hare Stadium • Auburn, AL	W 45–19
September 14	MAC	Toledo	Mississippi State	Davis Wade Stadium • Starkville, MS	L 17–41
September 14	AAC	Tulane	15 Oklahoma	Gaylord Family Oklahoma Stadium • Norman, OK	W 34–19
September 14	AAC	UTSA	2 Texas	Darrell K Royal-Texas Memorial Stadium • Austin, TX	W 56–7
September 14	Sun Belt	Vanderbilt	Georgia State	Center Parc Stadium • Atlanta, GA	L 32–36
September 21	Sun Belt	Georgia Southern	5 Ole Miss	Vaught–Hemingway Stadium • Oxford, MS	W 52–13
September 21	Sun Belt	Louisiana Monroe	1 Texas	Darrell K Royal–Texas Memorial Stadium • Austin, TX	W 51–3
September 21	MAC	Akron	South Carolina	Williams–Brice Stadium • Columbia, SC	W 50–7
September 21	MAC	Ohio	Kentucky	Kroger Field • Lexington, KY	W 41–6
September 21	MAC	Bowling Green	25 Texas A&M	Kyle Field • College Station, TX	W 26–20
September 28	Sun Belt	South Alabama	14 LSU	Tiger Stadium • Baton Rouge, LA	W 42–10
October 19	MAC	Ball State	Vanderbilt	FirstBank Stadium • Nashville, TN	W 24–14
November 16	Sun Belt	Louisiana–Monroe	Auburn	Jordan–Hare Stadium • Auburn, AL	W 48–14
November 16	CUSA	New Mexico State	15 Texas A&M	Kyle Field • College Station, TX	W 38–3
November 23	CUSA	Louisiana Tech	Arkansas	Donald W. Reynolds Razorback Stadium • Fayetteville, AR	W 35–14
November 23	CUSA	UTEP	11 Tennessee	Neyland Stadium • Knoxville, TN	W 56–0

Note:† Denotes Neutral Site Game

Updated through Week 13.

=== SEC vs FBS independents matchups ===
The following games include SEC teams competing against FBS Independents, which includes UConn and UMass.

Date	Visitor	Home	Site	Score
October 12	21 Missouri	UMass	Warren McGuirk Alumni Stadium • Hadley, MA	W 45–3
November 2	UMass	Mississippi State	Davis Wade Stadium • Starkville, MS	W 45–20
November 23	UMass	10 Georgia	Sanford Stadium • Athens, GA	W 59–21

Updated through Week 13.

=== SEC vs FCS matchups ===
The Football Championship Subdivision comprises 13 conferences and two independent programs.

Date	Conference	Visitor	Home	Site	Score
August 29	Missouri Valley	Murray State	11 Missouri	Faurot Field at Memorial Stadium • Columbia, MO	W 51–0
August 29	SWAC	Arkansas-Pine Bluff	Arkansas	War Memorial Stadium • Little Rock, AR	W 70–0
August 31	SWAC	Alabama A&M	Auburn	Jordan Hare Stadium • Auburn, AL	W 73–3
August 31	Southern	12 (FCS) Furman	6 Ole Miss	Vaught-Hemmingway Stadium • Oxford, MS	W 76–0
August 31	UAC	Eastern Kentucky	Mississippi State	Davis Wade Stadium • Starkville, MS	W 56–7
August 31	Southern	9 (FCS) UT Chattanooga	15 Tennessee	Neyland Stadium • Knoxville, TN	W 69–3
September 7	Southern	Samford	Florida	Ben Hill Griffin Stadium • Gainesville, FL	W 45–7
September 7	Ohio Valley	Tennessee Tech	1 Georgia	Sanford Stadium • Athens, GA	W 48–3
September 7	Southland	22 (FCS) Nicholls	18 LSU	Tiger Stadium • Baton Rouge, LA	W 44–21
September 7	Southland	McNeese	Texas A&M	Kyle Field • College Station, TX	W 52–10
September 7	SWAC	Alcorn State	Vanderbilt	FirstBank Stadium • Nashville, TN	W 55–0
November 2	America East	Maine	Oklahoma	Gaylord Family Oklahoma Stadium • Norman, OK	W 59–14
November 16	Missouri Valley	Murray State	Kentucky	Kroger Field • Lexington, KY	W 48–6
November 16	Southern	Mercer	10 Alabama	Bryant-Denny Stadium • Tuscaloosa, AL	W 52–7
November 23	Southern	Wofford	18 South Carolina	Williams-Brice Stadium • Columbia, SC	W 56–12

Note: † Denotes Neutral Site Game

Updated through Week 13.

=== SEC Records against other conferences ===
2024–25 records against non-conference foes:

Regular Season

Power 4 Conferences	Record
ACC	8–3
Big Ten	3–1
Big 12	2–2
Notre Dame	0–1
Power 4 Total	13–7
Other FBS Conferences	Record
American	5–0
CUSA	5–0
Independents (Excluding Notre Dame)	3–0
MAC	5–1
Mountain West	2–0
Sun Belt	6–1
Other FBS Total	26–2
FCS Opponents	Record
Football Championship Subdivision	15–0
Total Non-Conference Record	54–8

Post Season

Power 4 Conferences	Record
ACC	2–0
Big Ten	1–4
Big 12	2–0
Notre Dame	0–0
Power 4 Total	5–4
Other FBS Conferences	Record
American	1–1
CUSA	0–0
Independents (Excluding Notre Dame)	0–0
MAC	0–0
Mountain West	0–0
Sun Belt	0–0
Other FBS Total	1–1
Total Bowl Record	6–5

== Television selections ==
The Southeastern Conference has an exclusive television contract with ESPN, which allow games to be broadcast across all ESPN affiliated networks. Streaming broadcasts for games under SEC control are streamed on ESPN+. The conference also operates its own network, SEC Network, in conjunction with ESPN. Games under the control of other conferences fall under the contracts of the opposing conference.

Network	Wk 1	Wk 2	Wk 3	Wk 4	Wk 5	Wk 6	Wk 7	Wk 8	Wk 9	Wk 10	Wk 11	Wk 12	Wk 13	Wk 14	C	Bowls	Totals
ABC	4	3	3	2	3	3	3	2	2	2	3	3	3	5	1	2	
ESPN	4	2	2	2	1	1	1	2	1	1	1	–	1	2	–	12	
ESPN2	–	1	1	–	–	–								1	–		3
ESPNU	1	1	1	1	–	–									–		4
FOX	–	1	1	–	–	–									–		2
FS1	–	–	–	–	–	–									–		–
FS2	–	–	–	–	–	–									–		–
NBC	–	–	–	–	–	–									–		–
The CW	–	–	1	–	–	–									–		1
CBS Sports Network	–	–	–	–	–	–									–		–
SEC Network	4	3	3	3	2	2	2	3	3	3	2	3	3	2	–		
ESPN+ (streaming)	3	4	1	2	–	–		1		1		2	3		–		

Platform	Games
Broadcast	
Cable	
Streaming	

== Awards and honors ==
=== Players of the week ===
Week	Offensive Player of the Week	Defensive Player of the Week	Special Teams Player of the Week	Offensive Line Player of the Week	Defensive Line Player of the Week	Freshman Player of the Week
Week 1 (Sept 2)	Diego Pavia (Gr., QB, Vanderbilt); Carson Beck (Sr., QB, Georgia)	Keon Sabb (Jr., S, Alabama)	Peyton Woodring (So., PK, Georgia); Tyler Keltner (Sr., PK, Oklahoma)	Fernando Carmona Jr. (R-Jr., OL, Arkansas); Cameron Williams (Jr., OT, Texas)	Dylan Stewart (Fr., DE, South Carolina); Kyle Kennard (Gr., DE, South Carolina)	Ryan Coleman-Williams (Fr., WR, Alabama); Nico Iamaleava (R-Fr., QB, Tennessee)
Week 2 (Sept 9)	Quinn Ewers (Jr., QB, Texas)	Nick Emmanwori (Jr., DB, South Carolina)	Kai Kroeger (Gr., PK, South Carolina)	Jake Majors (Sr., OL, Texas); Cooper Mays (Sr., OL, Tennessee)	Gracen Halton (Jr., DL, Oklahoma); Tim Keenan III (R-Jr., DL, Alabama)	Nico Iamaleava (2) (R-Fr., QB, Tennessee)
Week 3 (Sept 16)	Jalen Milroe (R-Jr., QB, Alabama); Jaxson Dart (Sr., QB, Ole Miss)	Bradyn Swinson (Sr., DE, LSU); Raylen Wilson (So., LB, Georgia)	Blake Craig (R-Fr., PK, Missouri)	Trey Zuhn III (Jr., OL, Texas A&M)	Jared Ivey (Sr., DE, Ole Miss); Tyrion Ingram-Dawkins (R-Jr., DL, Georgia)	Arch Manning (R-Fr., QB, Texas); Marcel Reed (R-Fr., QB, Texas A&M)
Week 4 (Sept 23)	Nate Noel (Gr., RB, Missouri); Garrett Nussmeier (R-Jr., QB, LSU)	TJ Metcalf (So., DB, Arkansas)	Max Gilbert (R-Fr., PK, Tennessee)	Austin Barner (R-Jr., OL, Florida)	Bradyn Swinson (Sr., DE, LSU); Joshua Josephs (Jr., DL, Tennessee)	Nico Iamaleava (3) (R-Fr., QB, Tennessee)
Week 5 (Sept 30)	Jalen Milroe (2) (R-Jr., QB, Alabama)	Kip Lewis (R-So., LB, Oklahoma)	Alex Raynor (Sr. PK, Kentucky); Tyler White (Fr., P, Texas A&M)	Kelvin Banks Jr. (Jr., OL, Texas)	Octavious Oxendine (Sr., DL, Kentucky)	Ryan Coleman-Williams (2) (Fr., WR, Alabama)
Week 6 (Oct 7)	Diego Pavia (2) (Gr., QB, Vanderbilt)	Suntarine Perkins (So., DE, Ole Miss)	Brock Taylor (So., PK, Vanderbilt); Tyler White (2) (Fr., P, Texas A&M)	Gunnar Hansen (Sr., OT, Vanderbilt); Fernando Carmona Jr. (2) (R-Jr., OL, Arkansas)	Miles Capers (Sr., DE, Vanderbilt); Walter Nolen (Jr., DT, Ole Miss)	Malachi Singleton (R-Fr., QB, Arkansas)
Week 7 (Oct 14)	Garrett Nussmeier (2) (R-Jr., QB, LSU)	Whit Weeks (So., LB, LSU); Anthony Hill Jr. (So., LB, Texas)	Brock Taylor (2) (So., PK, Vanderbilt)	Kelvin Banks Jr. (2) (Jr., OL, Texas)	James Pearce Jr. (Jr., DL, Tennessee); Bradyn Swinson (2) (Sr., DE, LSU)	Michael Van Buren Jr. (Fr., QB, Mississippi State); Boo Carter (Fr., DB, Tennessee)
Week 8 (Oct 21)	Dylan Sampson (Jr., RB, Tennessee)	Jalon Walker (Jr., LB, Georgia); Nick Emmanwori (2) (Jr., DB, South Carolina)	Damian Ramos (R-Jr., PK, LSU)	Emery Jones Jr. (Jr., OT, LSU); Cooper Mays (2) (Sr., OL, Tennessee)	Tonka Hemingway (5Y, DT, South Carolina); Mykel Williams (Jr., DT, Georgia)	Jadan Baugh (Fr., RB, Florida)
Week 9 (Oct 28)	Jarquez Hunter (Jr., RB, Auburn); Taylen Green (R-Jr., QB, Arkansas)	Suntarine Perkins (2) (So., DE, Ole Miss); Michael Taaffe (Jr., DB, Texas)	Tyler White (3) (Fr., P, Texas A&M)	Tyler Booker (Jr., OL, Alabama); Izavion Miller (Sr., OL, Auburn)	Keldric Faulk (Jr., DL, Auburn)	Braylen Russell (Fr., RB, Arkansas); Marcel Reed (2) (R-Fr., QB, Texas A&M)
Week 10 (Nov 4)	Jaxson Dart (2) (Sr., QB, Ole Miss); Jordan Watkins (Sr., WR, Ole Miss)	TJ Dottery (So., LB, Ole Miss); Chaz Chambliss (Sr., LB, Georgia)	Jesse Mirco (Gr., P, Vanderbilt); Alex Herrera (6Y, PK, South Carolina)	Torricelli Simpkins III (R-Sr., OG, South Carolina)	Princely Umanmielen (Sr., DE, Ole Miss)	LaNorris Sellers (R-Fr., QB, South Carolina)
Week 11 (Nov 11)	Jalen Milroe (3) (R-Jr., QB, Alabama); Raheim Sanders (Sr., RB, South Carolina)	Jihaad Campbell (Jr., LB, Alabama); Triston Newson (Gr., LB, Missouri)	Caden Davis (Sr., PK, Ole Miss)	Tyler Booker (2) (Jr., OL, Alabama); Torricelli Simpkins III (2) (R-Sr., OG, South Carolina)	Jared Ivey (2) (Sr., DE, Ole Miss); Princely Umanmielen (2) (Sr., DE, Ole Miss)	LaNorris Sellers (2) (R-Fr., QB, South Carolina)
Week 12 (Nov 18)	LaNorris Sellers (R-Fr., QB, South Carolina)	Shemar James (Jr., ILB, Florida); Jahdae Barron (Sr., DB, Texas)	Trey Smack (Jr., PK, Florida); Brett Thorson (Jr., P, Georgia)	Hayden Conner (Sr., OG, Texas); Tate Ratledge (Sr., OG, Georgia)	Alfred Collins (Sr., DT, Texas)	DJ Lagway (Fr., QB, Florida)
Week 13 (Nov 25)	Jarquez Hunter (2) (Jr., RB, Auburn)	Bryce Thornton (So., DB, Florida); Anthony Hill Jr. (2) (So., LB, Texas)	Jeremy Crawshaw (Sr., P, Florida)	Febechi Nwaiwu (R-Jr., OL, Oklahoma); Will Campbell (Jr., OT, LSU)	Caleb Banks (R-Jr., DT, Florida); Mason Thomas (Jr., DL, Oklahoma)	Xavier Robinson (Fr., RB, Oklahoma); Cam Coleman (Fr., WR, Auburn)
Week 14 (Dec 2)	LaNorris Sellers (2) (R-Fr., QB, South Carolina); Quintrevion Wisner (So., RB, Texas)	Whit Weeks (2) (So., LB, LSU); Vernon Broughton (Sr., DL, Texas)	Aaron Anderson (R-So., WR/RS, LSU); Kai Kroeger (2) (Gr., PK, South Carolina)	Tyler Booker (3) (Jr., OL, Alabama); Andrej Karic (Sr., OG, Tennessee)	Johnny Walker Jr. (Gr., DE, Missouri); Walter Nolen (2) (Jr., DT, Ole Miss)	Nico Iamaleava (4) (R-Fr., QB, Tennessee); Dominick McKinley (Fr., DT, LSU)

==== Totals per school ====
School	Total
Alabama	5
South Carolina	4
Texas	4
Oklahoma	3
Tennessee	3
Kentucky	2
Arkansas	1
Georgia	1
Texas A&M	1
Vanderbilt	1
Auburn	0
Florida	0
LSU	0
Mississippi State	0
Missouri	0
Ole Miss	0

=== SEC individual awards ===
==== Players of the Year ====
On December 11, 2024, the Southeastern Conference released their Players of the Year and All-Conference Honors at the end of the season.

Award	Player/Coaches	School
Offensive Player of the Year	Dylan Sampson	Tennessee
Defensive Player of the Year	Kyle Kennard	South Carolina
Freshman of the Year	LaNorris Sellers	South Carolina
Special Teams Player of the Year	Alex Raynor	Kentucky
Newcomer of the Year	Diego Pavia	Vanderbilt
Jacobs Blocking Trophy	Kelvin Banks Jr. Will Campbell	Texas LSU
Scholar Athlete of the Year	Brady Cook	Missouri
Coach of the Year	Clark Lea	Vanderbilt

=== All-SEC teams ===
At the conclusion of the regular season, All-SEC Conference football teams were named.

=== All-Americans ===
Currently, the NCAA compiles consensus all-America teams in the sports of Division I-FBS football and Division I men's basketball using a point system computed from All-America teams named by coaches associations or media sources. The system consists of three points for a first-team honor, two points for second-team honor, and one point for third-team honor. Honorable mention and fourth team or lower recognitions are not accorded any points. College Football All-American consensus teams are compiled by position and the player accumulating the most points at each position is named first team consensus all-American. Currently, the NCAA recognizes All-Americans selected by the AP, AFCA, FWAA, TSN, and the WCFF to determine Consensus and Unanimous All-Americans. Any player named to the First Team by all five of the NCAA-recognized selectors is deemed a Unanimous All-American.

=== National award winners ===
2024 College Football Award Winners

Award	Player	Class	Position	School
William V. Campbell Trophy	Jalen Milroe	RS Jr.	QB	Alabama
Thorpe Award	Jahdae Barron	Sr.	DB	Texas
Lombardi Award	Kelvin Banks Jr.	Jr.	OT	Texas
Outland Trophy	Kelvin Banks Jr.	Jr.	OT	Texas
Bronco Nagurski Award	Kyle Kennard	Sr.	Edge	South Carolina
Dick Butkus Award	Jalon Walker	Jr.	LB	Georgia

== Home game attendance ==
Team	Stadium	Capacity	Game 1	Game 2	Game 3	Game 4	Game 5	Game 6	Game 7	Game 8	Total	Average	% of Capacity
Alabama	Bryant–Denny Stadium	100,077	100,077	100,077	100,077	100,077	100,077	100,077	100,077		700,539	100,077	100%
Arkansas	Donald W. Reynolds Razorback Stadium	76,212	40,127 (Note: Game played at Arkansas' secondary home stadium War Memorial Stadium, capacity: 54,120)	75,021	75,573	75,893	72,894	74,929	66,041		480,478	73,392	96.3%
Auburn	Jordan–Hare Stadium	87,451	88,043	88,043	88,043	88,043	88,043	88,043	88,043	88,043	704,344	88,043	100.68%
Florida	Ben Hill Griffin Stadium	88,548	90,544	89,295	89,993	90,369	89,906	90,067	89,942		630,116	90,017	101.66%
Georgia	Sanford Stadium	93,033	93,033	93,033	93,033	93,033	93,033	93,033			558,198	93,033	100%
Kentucky	Kroger Field	61,000	61,627	61,349	61,663	61,783	62,120	60,605	48,370	58,612	476,129	59,516	97.57%
LSU	Tiger Stadium	102,321	100,242	100,315	102,143	102,212	102,283	102,086	99,364		708,645	101,235	98.94%
Mississippi State	Davis Wade Stadium	60,311	48,724	47,412	49,655	50,127	49,303	48,617	47,824		341,662	48,809	80.93%
Missouri	Faurot Field	62,621	62,621	62,621	62,621	62,621	62,621	62,621	62,621		438,347	62,621	100%
Oklahoma	Gaylord Family Oklahoma Memorial Stadium	80,126	83,329	83,653	83,325	84,701	83,331	82,831	84,053		585,223	83,603	104.34%
Ole Miss	Vaught–Hemingway Stadium	64,038	66,105	66,427	67,505	67,616	67,926	68,126	67,896		471,601	67,372	105.21%
South Carolina	Williams–Brice Stadium	77,559	78,496	79,531	78,704	79,837	80,298	79,361	79,078		555,305	79,329	102.28%
Tennessee	Neyland Stadium	101,915	101,915	101,915	101,915	101,915	101,915	101,915	101,915		713,405	101,915	100%
Texas	Darrell K Royal-Texas Memorial Stadium	100,119	99,171	101,892	102,850	101,388	105,215	103,375	102,811		716,702	102,386	102.26%
Texas A&M	Kyle Field	102,733	107,315	92,345	99,523	97,049	108,852	105,815	109,028		719,927	102,847	100.11%
Vanderbilt	FirstBank Stadium	34,000 (Note: Approximate capacity upon completion of renovations for the 2024 season. Exact number to be announced.)	28,934	24,080	28,934	27,884	28,934	28,934	28,934		196,634	28,091	82.62%
Conference		80,754									8,997,255	69,746	99.24%

== NFL draft ==
The NFL draft will be held at Lambeau Field in Green Bay, Wisconsin. The Following list includes all SEC Players in the draft.

=== List of selections ===
Player	Position	School	Draft Round	Round Pick	Overall Pick	Team
Will Campbell	OT	LSU	1	4	4	New England Patriots
Armand Membou	OT	Missouri	1	7	7	New York Jets
Kelvin Banks Jr.	OT	Texas	1	9	9	New Orleans Saints
Mykel Williams	DE	Georgia	1	11	11	San Francisco 49ers
Tyler Booker	OG	Alabama	1	12	12	Dallas Cowboys
Jalon Walker	LB	Georgia	1	15	15	Atlanta Falcons
Walter Nolen	DT	Ole Miss	1	16	16	Arizona Cardinals
Shemar Stewart	DE	Texas A&M	1	17	17	Cincinnati Bengals
Jahdae Barron	CB	Texas	1	20	20	Denver Broncos
Matthew Golden	WR	Texas	1	23	23	Green Bay Packers
Jaxson Dart	QB	Ole Miss	1	25	25	New York Giants
James Pearce Jr.	DE	Tennessee	1	26	26	Atlanta Falcons
Malaki Starks	S	Georgia	1	27	27	Baltimore Ravens
Maxwell Hairston	CB	Kentucky	1	30	30	Buffalo Bills
Jihaad Campbell	LB	Alabama	1	31	31	Philadelphia Eagles
Nick Emmanwori	S	South Carolina	2	3	35	Seattle Seahawks
Luther Burden III	WR	Missouri	2	7	39	Chicago Bears
T. J. Sanders	DT	South Carolina	2	9	41	Buffalo Bills
Mason Taylor	TE	LSU	2	10	42	New York Jets
Alfred Collins	DT	Texas	2	11	43	San Francisco 49ers
Demetrius Knight	LB	South Carolina	2	17	49	Cincinnati Bengals
Nic Scourton	EDGE	Texas A&M	2	19	51	Carolina Panthers
Tre Harris	WR	Ole Miss	2	23	55	Los Angeles Chargers
Tate Ratledge	OG	Georgia	2	25	57	Detroit Lions
Trey Amos	CB	Ole Miss	2	29	61	Washington Commanders
Shemar Turner	DT	Texas A&M	2	30	62	Chicago Bears
Omarr Norman-Lott	DT	Tennessee	2	31	63	Kansas City Chiefs
Andrew Mukuba	S	Texas	2	32	64	Philadelphia Eagles
Isaac TeSlaa	WR	Arkansas	3	6	70	Detroit Lions
Vernon Broughton	DT	Texas	3	7	71	New Orleans Saints
Landon Jackson	EDGE	Arkansas	3	8	72	Buffalo Bills
Princely Umanmielen	EDGE	Ole Miss	3	13	77	Carolina Panthers
Dylan Fairchild	OG	Georgia	3	17	81	Cincinnati Bengals
Emery Jones	OT	LSU	3	27	91	Baltimore Ravens
Jalen Milroe	QB	Alabama	3	28	92	Seattle Seahawks
Jared Wilson	C	Georgia	3	31	95	New England Patriots
Sai'vion Jones	EDGE	LSU	3	37	101	Denver Broncos
Chimere Dike	WR	Florida	4	1	103	Tennessee Titans
Dont'e Thornton	WR	Tennessee	4	6	108	Las Vegas Raiders
Deone Walker	DT	Kentucky	4	7	109	Buffalo Bills
Arian Smith	WR	Georgia	4	8	110	New York Jets
Danny Stutsman	LB	Oklahoma	4	10	112	New Orleans Saints
Trevor Etienne	RB	Georgia	4	12	114	Carolina Panthers
Jarquez Hunter	RB	Auburn	4	15	117	Los Angeles Rams
Billy Bowman Jr.	S	Oklahoma	4	16	118	Atlanta Falcons
Gunnar Helm	TE	Texas	4	18	120	Tennessee Titans
Barryn Sorrell	EDGE	Texas	4	22	124	Green Bay Packers
Kyle Kennard	EDGE	South Carolina	4	23	125	Los Angeles Chargers
Dylan Sampson	RB	Tennessee	4	24	126	Cleveland Browns
Malachi Moore	S	Alabama	4	28	130	New York Jets
Que Robinson	EDGE	Alabama	4	32	134	Denver Broncos
Tonka Hemingway	DT	South Carolina	4	33	135	Las Vegas Raiders
Jordan Watkins	WR	Ole Miss	4	36	138	San Francisco 49ers
Tyrion Ingram-Dawkins	DE	Georgia	5	1	139	Minnesota Vikings
Cam Jackson	DT	Florida	5	2	140	Carolina Panthers
Bradyn Swinson	EDGE	LSU	5	8	146	New England Patriots
Jaydon Blue	RB	Texas	5	11	149	Dallas Cowboys
Jason Marshall Jr.	CB	Florida	5	12	150	Miami Dolphins
Shemar James	LB	Florida	5	14	152	Dallas Cowboys
KeAndre Lambert-Smith	WR	Auburn	5	20	158	Los Angeles Chargers
Smael Mondon Jr.	LB	Georgia	5	23	161	Philadelphia Eagles
Miles Frazier	OG	LSU	5	33	171	Detroit Lions
Chris Paul Jr.	LB	Ole Miss	5	34	172	Los Angeles Rams
Robbie Ouzts	TE	Alabama	5	38	175	Seattle Seahawks
JJ Pegues	DT	Ole Miss	6	4	180	Las Vegas Raiders
Tim Smith	DT	Alabama	6	14	190	Indianapolis Colts
Jalen McLeod	LB	Auburn	6	18	194	Jacksonville Jaguars
Graham Mertz	QB	Florida	6	21	197	Houston Texans
Warren Brinson	DT	Georgia	6	22	198	Green Bay Packers
Cameron Williams	OT	Texas	6	31	207	Philadelphia Eagles
Hayden Conner	OG	Texas	6	35	211	Arizona Cardinals
Jeremy Crawshaw	P	Florida	6	40	216	Denver Broncos
Marcus Bryant	OT	Missouri	7	4	220	New England Patriots
Dan Jackson	S	Georgia	7	14	230	Detroit Lions
Quinn Ewers	QB	Texas	7	15	231	Miami Dolphins
Garrett Dellinger	OG	LSU	7	27	243	Baltimore Ravens
Dominic Lovett	WR	Georgia	7	28	244	Detroit Lions
Julian Ashby	LS	Vanderbilt	7	35	251	New England Patriots
Trikweze Bridges	CB	Florida	7	40	256	Los Angeles Chargers

=== Total picks by school ===
Team	Round 1	Round 2	Round 3	Round 4	Round 5	Round 6	Round 7	Total
Alabama	2	–	1	2	1	1	–	7
Arkansas	–	–	2	–	–	–	–	2
Auburn	–	–	–	1	1	1	–	3
Florida	–	–	–	1	3	2	1	7
Georgia	3	1	2	2	2	1	2	13
Kentucky	1	–	–	1	–	–	–	2
LSU	1	1	2	–	2	–	1	7
Mississippi State	–	–	–	–	–	–	–	0
Missouri	1	1	–	–	–	–	1	3
Oklahoma	–	–	–	2	–	–	–	2
Ole Miss	2	2	1	1	1	1	–	8
South Carolina	–	3	–	2	–	–	–	5
Tennessee	1	1	–	2	–	–	–	4
Texas	3	2	1	2	1	2	1	12
Texas A&M	1	2	–	–	–	–	–	3
Vanderbilt	–	–	–	–	–	–	1	1
Total	15	13	9	16	11	8	7	79
