= Deone Walker =

American football player (born 2004)

No. 96 – Buffalo Bills
- Position: Defensive tackle
- Roster status: Active

Personal information
- Born: March 11, 2004 (age 22); Detroit, Michigan, U.S.
- Listed height: 6 ft 7 in (2.01 m)
- Listed weight: 331 lb (150 kg)

Career information
- High school: Cass Tech (Detroit, Michigan)
- College: Kentucky (2022–2024)
- NFL draft: 2025: 4th round, 109th overall pick

Career history
- Buffalo Bills (2025–present)

Awards and highlights
- PFWA All-Rookie Team (2025); 3× Second-team All-SEC (2022-2024)

Career NFL statistics as of Week 11, 2026
- Total tackles: 69
- Sacks: 2.0
- Pass deflections: 10
- Fumble recoveries: 1
- Stats at Pro Football Reference

Deone Walker (born March 11, 2004) is an American professional football defensive tackle for the Buffalo Bills of the National Football League (NFL). He played college football for the Kentucky Wildcats and was selected by the Bills in the fourth round of the 2025 NFL draft.

== Early life ==
Walker grew up in Detroit, Michigan, and attended Cass Technical High School. In addition to playing football, he was also a member of the basketball team. Walker made 28 with 13 tackles for loss, seven sacks and three forced fumbles in his junior season. He had 43 tackles, 15 tackles for loss, and six sacks in seven games as a senior. Walker was rated a four-star recruit and committed to play college football at Kentucky from 30 total scholarship offers, including programs such as Alabama, Georgia, LSU, Michigan, Michigan State, and Penn State.

== College career ==
Walker entered his freshman season at Kentucky as a member of the defensive line rotation before becoming a starter three games into the year. He was named a semifinalist for the Shaun Alexander Award.

== Professional career ==
Pre-draft measurables
Height	Weight	Arm length	Hand span	Wingspan	40-yard dash	10-yard split	20-yard split	Vertical jump	Broad jump	Bench press
6 ft 7 3/8 in (2.02 m)	331 lb (150 kg)	34 1/4 in (0.87 m)	10 5/8 in (0.27 m)	7 ft 0 1/8 in (2.14 m)	5.36 s	1.90 s	3.01 s	25.0 in (0.64 m)	8 ft 8 in (2.64 m)	22 reps
All values from NFL Combine/Pro Day

Walker was selected in the fourth round with the 109th overall pick by the Buffalo Bills in the 2025 NFL draft. In the Divisional Round of the playoffs against the Denver Broncos, Walker recorded an interception off quarterback Bo Nix in the 33–30 overtime loss.

== NFL career statistics ==
=== Regular season ===
Year	Team	Games		Tackles							Interceptions					Fumbles			
Year	Team	GP	GS	Cmb	Solo	Ast	TFL	QBH	Sck	Sfty	Int	Yds	Lng	TD	PD	FF	FR	Yds	TD
2025	BUF	17	16	39	17	22	8	4	1.0	0	0	0	0	0	4	0	1	6	0
2026	BUF	10	10	30	12	18	5	6	1.0	0	0	0	0	0	6	0	0	0	0
Career		26	25	69	29	40	13	10	2.0	0	0	0	0	0	10	0	1	6	0

=== Playoffs ===
Year	Team	Games		Tackles							Interceptions					Fumbles			
Year	Team	GP	GS	Cmb	Solo	Ast	TFL	QBH	Sck	Sfty	Int	Yds	Lng	TD	PD	FF	FR	Yds	TD
2025	BUF	2	2	6	3	3	0	0	0.0	0	1	3	3	0	2	0	0	0	0
Career		2	2	6	3	3	0	0	0.0	0	1	3	3	0	2	0	0	0	0
