= Mykel Williams =

American football player (born 2004)

No. 98 – San Francisco 49ers
- Position: Defensive end
- Roster status: Active

Personal information
- Born: June 29, 2004 (age 22); Warm Springs, Georgia, U.S.
- Listed height: 6 ft 5 in (1.96 m)
- Listed weight: 267 lb (121 kg)

Career information
- High school: Hardaway (Columbus, Georgia)
- College: Georgia (2022–2024)
- NFL draft: 2025: 1st round, 11th overall pick

Career history
- San Francisco 49ers (2025–present)

Awards and highlights
- CFP national champion (2022); 2× second-team All-SEC (2023, 2024)

Career NFL statistics as of Week 10, 2026
- Total tackles: 29
- Sacks: 2.5
- Fumble recoveries: 1
- Stats at Pro Football Reference

Mykel DeAnthony Williams (born June 29, 2004) is an American professional football defensive end for the San Francisco 49ers of the National Football League (NFL). He played college football for the Georgia Bulldogs, winning a national championship in 2022. Williams was selected by the 49ers in the first round of the 2025 NFL draft.

== Early life ==
Williams was born on June 29, 2004, in Warm Springs, Georgia, later attending Hardaway High School in nearby Columbus. After his senior season, he was named the Maxwell Football National High School Defensive Player of the Year. A five star prospect, Williams was ranked by 247Sports as the fourth-best recruit in the 2022 recruiting class.

== College career ==
Williams initially committed to USC, but flipped to Georgia in October 2021. He was the highest-rated recruit signed by defending national champion Georgia in the 2022 recruiting cycle. In July 2022, Georgia head coach Kirby Smart said of Williams: "The number one thing that stands out about Mykel is his work ethic. ... I'm excited for him ... He's a great young man."

As a true freshman in 2022, CBS Sports rated him as a "freshman to watch", and ESPN rated him as a preseason true freshman All-American. He played in Georgia's 2022 season opener against No. 11 Oregon and registered two quarterback hurries. At the end of the season, he was named to Pro Football Focus's PFF True Freshman All-America team.

Williams' number at Georgia was #13.

== Professional career ==
On January 6, 2025, Williams declared for the 2025 NFL draft.

Pre-draft measurables
Height	Weight	Arm length	Hand span	Wingspan
6 ft 5 1/8 in (1.96 m)	260 lb (118 kg)	34 3/8 in (0.87 m)	10 1/4 in (0.26 m)	6 ft 10 7/8 in (2.11 m)
All values from NFL Combine

Williams was selected by the San Francisco 49ers in the first round with the 11th overall pick in the 2025 NFL draft. On May 14, Williams signed with the 49ers on a four-year deal worth $24.943 million. He started all nine games he appeared in, recording one fumble recovery, one sack, and 20 combined tackles. In Week 9 against the New York Giants, Williams suffered a season-ending torn ACL in his right knee. On November 8, 2025, Williams was placed on injured reserve.

== NFL career statistics ==
Year	Team	Games		Tackles						Interceptions					Fumbles			
Year	Team	GP	GS	Cmb	Solo	Ast	TfL	Sck	Sfty	Int	Yds	Lng	TD	PD	FF	FR	Yds	TD
2025	SF	9	9	20	11	9	4	1	0	0	0	0	0	0	0	1	0	0
Career		9	9	20	11	9	4	1	0	0	0	0	0	0	0	1	0	0
