= Emery Jones Jr. =

American football player (born 2004)

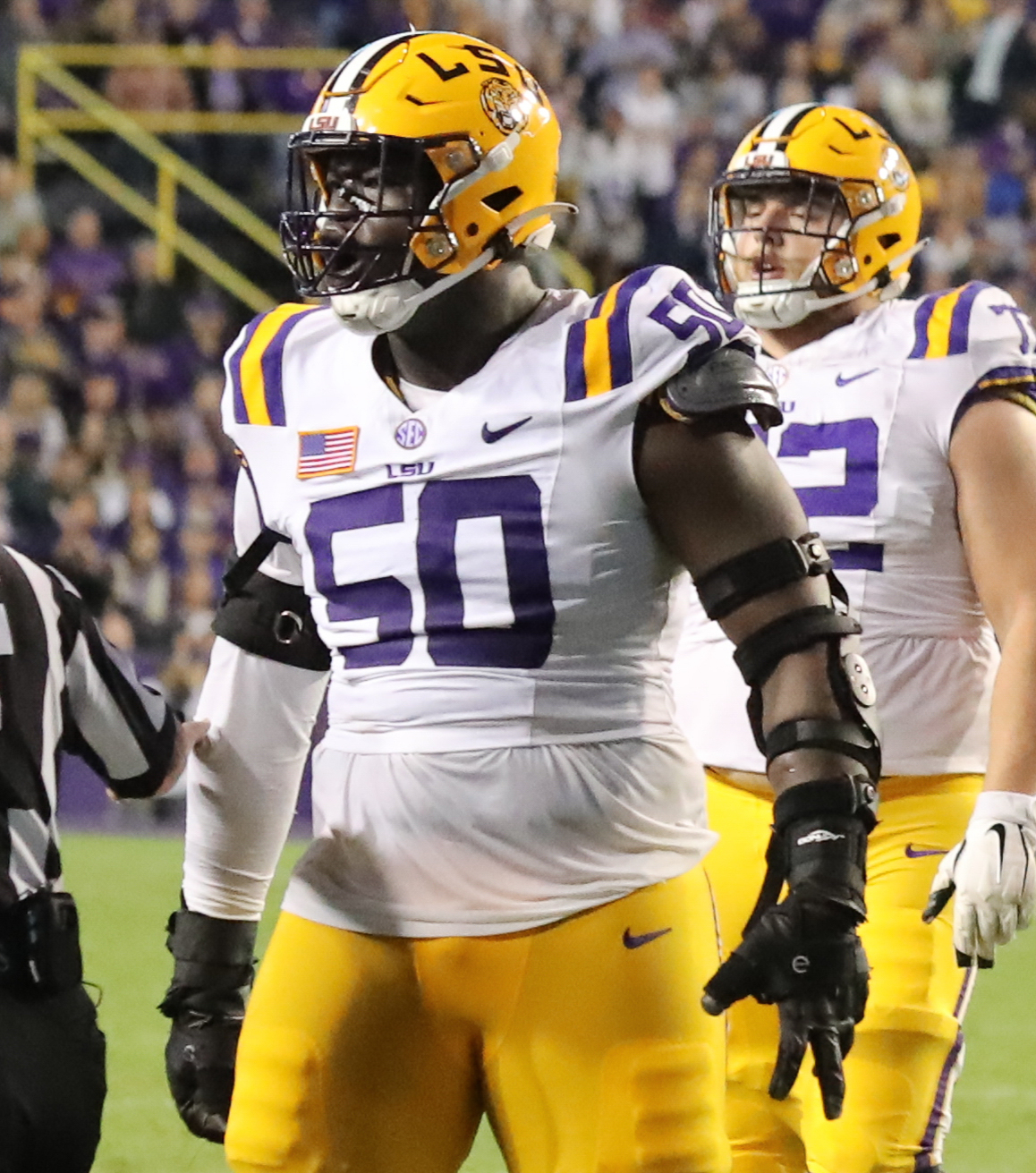
- Booker with the LSU Tigers in 2023

No. 51 – Baltimore Ravens
- Position: Guard
- Roster status: Active

Personal information
- Born: March 5, 2004 (age 22); Plaquemine, Louisiana, U.S.
- Listed height: 6 ft 5 in (1.96 m)
- Listed weight: 325 lb (147 kg)

Career information
- High school: Catholic (Baton Rouge, Louisiana)
- College: LSU (2022–2024)
- NFL draft: 2025: 3rd round, 91st overall pick

Career history
- Baltimore Ravens (2025–present)

Awards and highlights
- 2× Second-team All-SEC (2023, 2024)
- Stats at Pro Football Reference

Emery Jones Jr. (born March 5, 2004) is an American professional football guard for the Baltimore Ravens of the National Football League (NFL). He played college football for the LSU Tigers and was selected by the Ravens in the third round of the 2025 NFL draft.

== Early life ==
Jones was born on March 5, 2004, in Plaquemine, Louisiana. He attended Catholic High School in Baton Rouge where he was a standout offensive tackle. He played two sports – football and basketball – and helped the football team win back-to-back state championships. He was twice selected all-district and twice was all-state, helping the team compile an overall record of 44–7 in his tenure there. Jones was invited to play at the Under Armour All-America Game. He was ranked a four-star recruit, the sixth-best offensive tackle, the 12th-best player in the state, and the 145th-best player nationally. he committed to play college football for the LSU Tigers.

== College career ==
Jones became a starting tackle for the Tigers two games into his true freshman season, playing across from fellow true freshman Will Campbell. He ultimately appeared in 14 games, 12 as a starter, for the team that year, being named a Freshman All-American and a selection to the Southeastern Conference (SEC) All-Freshman team. In his second season, he started 12 games and was named second-team All-SEC while helping LSU become a finalist for the Joe Moore Award, given to the nation's best offensive line. He was named one of the top 10 returning offensive tackles for the 2024 season by Pro Football Focus (PFF). On December 12, 2024, Jones announced that he would be entering the 2025 NFL draft.

== Professional career ==
Pre-draft measurables
Height	Weight	Arm length	Hand span	Wingspan
6 ft 5 1/4 in (1.96 m)	315 lb (143 kg)	34 1/4 in (0.87 m)	10 3/4 in (0.27 m)	6 ft 9 1/2 in (2.07 m)
All values from NFL Combine

=== Baltimore Ravens ===
Jones was selected by the Baltimore Ravens with the 91st overall pick in the third round of the 2025 NFL draft. He underwent surgery to tend to a shoulder injury shortly after the NFL Combine, and was placed on the NFI List to begin the regular season as a result. Jones was activated on October 22, 2025, ahead of the team's Week 8 matchup against the Chicago Bears.
