= Tate Ratledge =

American football player (born 2001)

No. 69 – Detroit Lions
- Position: Guard
- Roster status: Active

Personal information
- Born: April 26, 2001 (age 25); Chattanooga, Tennessee, U.S.
- Listed height: 6 ft 6 in (1.98 m)
- Listed weight: 322 lb (146 kg)

Career information
- High school: Darlington School (Rome, Georgia)
- College: Georgia (2020–2024)
- NFL draft: 2025: 2nd round, 57th overall pick

Career history
- Detroit Lions (2025–present)

Awards and highlights
- 2× CFP national champion (2021, 2022); First-team All-American (2024); Second-team All-American (2023); First-team All-SEC (2023, 2024)

Career NFL statistics as of 2025
- Games played: 17
- Games started: 17
- Stats at Pro Football Reference

Tate Collier Ratledge (born April 26, 2001) is an American professional football guard for the Detroit Lions of the National Football League (NFL). He played college football for the Georgia Bulldogs, where he was an All-American and a two-time national champion. He was selected by the Lions in the second round of the 2025 NFL draft.

== Early life ==
Ratledge was born in Chattanooga, Tennessee, and grew up in Rome, Georgia. He is the son of Dean Ratledge, a coach for over 40 years. He attended Darlington School, where he competed in football, basketball and track and field. Coming out of high school Ratledge was ranked the number 39 overall player in the 2020 class, the number five rank at his position and number six in the state of Georgia. Ratledge committed to play college football at the University of Georgia over Tennessee, whom he grew up rooting for.

== College career ==
As a freshman in 2020, Ratledge played in one game against Auburn, playing a total of seven snaps. In 2021, he earned a starting spot as a sophomore ahead of the season opener against Clemson, but suffered a Lisfranc ligament fracture in his foot after just four snaps and missed the rest of the season.

In the 2022 season, Ratledge started 14 of the team's 15 games, only missing one game against Kentucky. He also got a start in the Bulldogs' two College Football Playoff games, including in the 2023 College Football Playoff National Championship. He allowed one sack in 448 pass-blocking snaps.

Ratledge was ranked the seventh best returning interior offensive lineman by Pro Football Focus ahead of the 2023 season. He was also named preseason first-team all-SEC. Ratledge was also mentioned on the watchlists of multiple awards, such as the Outland Trophy and Lombardi Award. For the 2023 season, he started 13 of 14 games at right guard for the Bulldogs, giving up no sacks in 448 pass-blocking snaps and earning an All-American nod as well as first-team All-SEC honors.

In 2024, Ratledge appeared in 10 games at right guard as a senior. He allowed one sack in 311 pass-blocking snaps and was once again named an All-American as well as repeating as a first-team All-SEC selection.

== Professional career ==
Pre-draft measurables
| Height | Weight | Arm length | Hand span | Wingspan | 40-yard dash | 10-yard split | 20-yard split | Three-cone drill | Vertical jump | Broad jump | Bench press |
|---|---|---|---|---|---|---|---|---|---|---|---|
| 6 ft 6 1/2 in (1.99 m) | 308 lb (140 kg) | 32 1/4 in (0.82 m) | 10 3/8 in (0.26 m) | 6 ft 7 1/4 in (2.01 m) | 4.97 s | 1.72 s | 2.89 s | 7.38 s | 32.0 in (0.81 m) | 9 ft 5 in (2.87 m) | 25 reps |
All values from NFL Combine/Pro Day

Ratledge was selected in the second round with the 57th overall pick of the 2025 NFL draft by the Detroit Lions.
