= Dylan Fairchild =

American football player (born 2003)

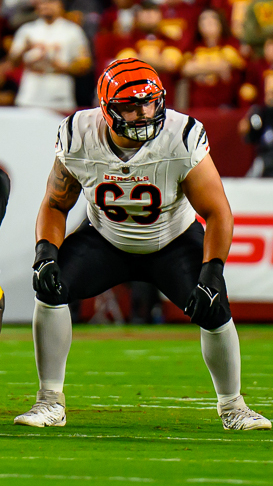
- Fairchild with the Cincinnati Bengals in 2025

No. 63 – Cincinnati Bengals
- Position: Guard
- Roster status: Active

Personal information
- Born: May 8, 2003 (age 23)
- Listed height: 6 ft 5 in (1.96 m)
- Listed weight: 318 lb (144 kg)

Career information
- High school: West Forsyth (Cumming, Georgia)
- College: Georgia (2021–2024)
- NFL draft: 2025: 3rd round, 81st overall pick

Career history
- Cincinnati Bengals (2025–present)

Awards and highlights
- PFF All-Rookie Team (2025); ESPN NFL All-Rookie Team (2025); 2× CFP national champion (2021, 2022); Second-team All-SEC (2024)

Career NFL statistics as of 2025
- Games played: 15
- Games started: 15
- Stats at Pro Football Reference

Dylan Cooper Fairchild (born May 8, 2003) is an American professional football guard for the Cincinnati Bengals of the National Football League (NFL). He played college football for the Georgia Bulldogs and was selected by the Bengals in the third round of the 2025 NFL draft.

== Early life ==
Fairchild attended West Forsyth High School in Cumming, Georgia. In 2021, he was a participant in the High School All-American bowl. In addition to playing football, Fairchild was a two-time state-champion wrestler, finishing his career with a 67–0 record. A four-star recruit, Fairchild committed to play college football at the University of Georgia over offers from Auburn, Tennessee, and South Carolina.

== College career ==
After primarily playing as a backup in his first two seasons, Fairchild played in 14 games and started ten games at left guard in 2023. Entering the 2024 season, he was named one of the top returning guards in college football. Fairchild declared for the 2025 NFL draft, following the 2024 season.

== Professional career ==
Pre-draft measurables
Height	Weight	Arm length	Hand span	Wingspan	Vertical jump	Broad jump
6 ft 5 1/4 in (1.96 m)	318 lb (144 kg)	33 in (0.84 m)	10 in (0.25 m)	6 ft 8 3/4 in (2.05 m)	29.5 in (0.75 m)	9 ft 3 in (2.82 m)
All values from NFL Combine/Pro Day

Fairchild was selected in the third round, with the 81st overall pick, of the 2025 NFL draft by the Cincinnati Bengals. Fairchild earned a 96 athleticism score at the NFL Scouting Combine, which was the second highest among all guards in his class. He was named the starter at left guard going into his rookie season.
