= Shemar James =

American football linebacker (born 2004)

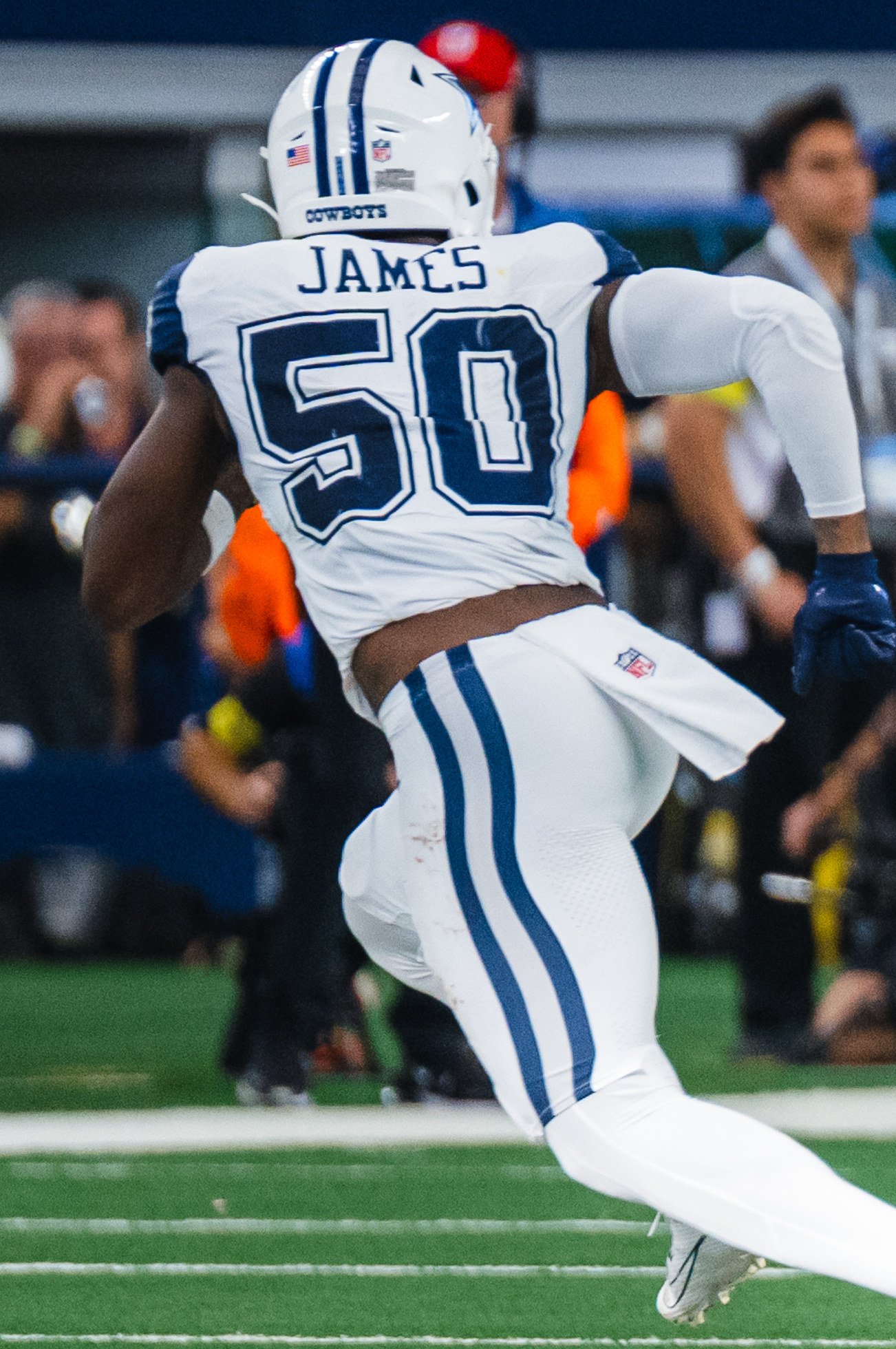
- James with the Dallas Cowboys in 2025

No. 50 – Dallas Cowboys
- Position: Linebacker
- Roster status: Active

Personal information
- Born: June 24, 2004 (age 22)
- Listed height: 6 ft 1 in (1.85 m)
- Listed weight: 235 lb (107 kg)

Career information
- High school: Faith Academy (Mobile, Alabama)
- College: Florida (2022–2024)
- NFL draft: 2025: 5th round, 152nd overall pick

Career history
- Dallas Cowboys (2025–present)

Career NFL statistics as of Week 3, 2026
- Total tackles: 94
- Sacks: 1.5
- Forced fumbles: 1
- Stats at Pro Football Reference

Shemar James (born June 24, 2004) is an American professional football linebacker for the Dallas Cowboys of the National Football League (NFL). He played college football for the Florida Gators and was selected by the Cowboys in the fifth round of the 2025 NFL draft.

== Early life ==
James attended the Faith Academy in Mobile, Alabama. As a junior, he recorded 70 tackles with 17 going for a loss, and seven sacks, while on offense he rushed for 268 yards and five touchdowns and made 35 receptions for 473 yards and eight touchdowns. Coming out of high school, James was rated as a four-star recruit, the 2nd best linebacker, and the 18th overall prospect in the class of 2022. James committed to play college football for the Florida Gators over Alabama.

== College career ==
As a freshman in 2022, James played in all 13 games earning four starts where he totaled 47 tackles with two going for a loss, two sacks, a fumble recovery, and a forced fumble. In the 2023 season opener, he tallied 13 tackles versus Utah. Before Florida's week 9 matchup versus Georgia, James suffered a season-ending knee injury. During the 2023 season, James notched 55 tackles with five and a half being for a loss, and a sack in eight games. In the 2024 season James recorded his first interception against rival Miami.

== Professional career ==
Pre-draft measurables
| Height | Weight | Arm length | Hand span | Wingspan | 40-yard dash | 10-yard split | 20-yard split | 20-yard shuttle | Three-cone drill | Vertical jump | Broad jump |
|---|---|---|---|---|---|---|---|---|---|---|---|
| 6 ft 1 3/8 in (1.86 m) | 222 lb (101 kg) | 31 1/2 in (0.80 m) | 8 1/2 in (0.22 m) | 6 ft 5 3/4 in (1.97 m) | 4.69 s | 1.56 s | 2.75 s | 4.27 s | 7.09 s | 32.0 in (0.81 m) | 9 ft 9 in (2.97 m) |
All values from NFL Combine

James was selected by the Dallas Cowboys with the 152nd pick in the fifth round of the 2025 NFL draft.

=== Regular season ===
| Year | Team | Games | | Tackles | | | | | | Interceptions | | | | | | Fumbles | |
| Year | Team | GP | GS | Cmb | Solo | Ast | Sck | QBHits | TFL | PD | Int | Yds | Avg | Lng | TD | FF | FR |
|---|---|---|---|---|---|---|---|---|---|---|---|---|---|---|---|---|---|
| 2025 | DAL | 14 | 6 | 91 | 40 | 51 | 1.5 | 5 | 2 | 0 | 0 | 0 | 0 | 0 | 0 | 1 | 0 |
| Career | | 14 | 6 | 91 | 40 | 51 | 1.5 | 5 | 2 | 0 | 0 | 0 | 0 | 0 | 0 | 1 | 0 |
