= Nic Scourton =

American football player (born 2004)

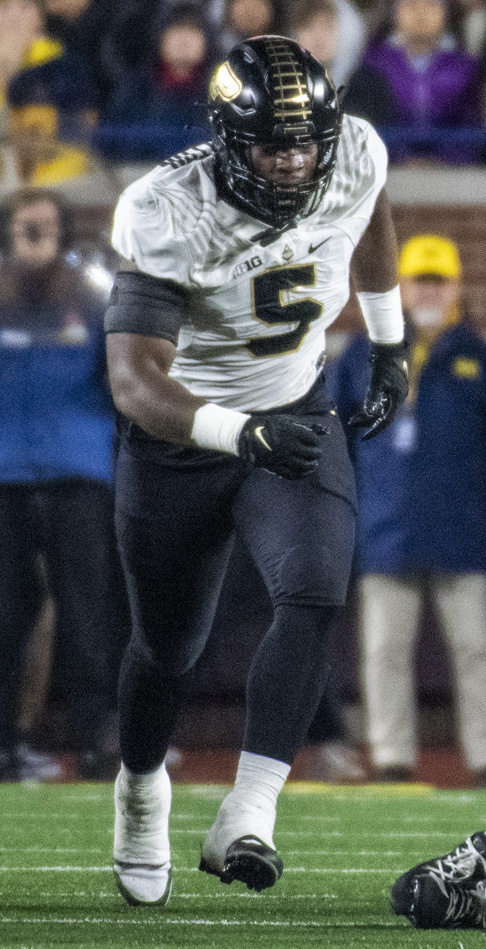
- Scourton with the Purdue Boilermakers in 2023

No. 11 – Carolina Panthers
- Position: Outside linebacker
- Roster status: Injured reserve

Personal information
- Born: August 25, 2004 (age 22); Timpson, Texas, U.S.
- Listed height: 6 ft 3 in (1.91 m)
- Listed weight: 265 lb (120 kg)

Career information
- High school: Bryan (TX)
- College: Purdue (2022–2023); Texas A&M (2024)
- NFL draft: 2025: 2nd round, 51st overall pick

Career history
- Carolina Panthers (2025–present)

Awards and highlights
- First-team All-SEC (2024); Second-team All-Big Ten (2023)

Career NFL statistics as of 2025
- Tackles: 47
- Sacks: 5
- Forced fumbles: 1
- Pass deflections: 1
- Stats at Pro Football Reference

Nictiedric J. Scourton (born August 25, 2004) is an American professional football outside linebacker for the Carolina Panthers of the National Football League (NFL). He played college football for the Purdue Boilermakers and Texas A&M Aggies. Scourton was selected by the Panthers in the second round of the 2025 NFL draft.

== Early life ==
A native of Timpson, Texas, Scourton attended Bryan High School in Bryan, Texas. Over his final two high school seasons, he had 136 tackles and eight sacks. Scourton was selected to play in the 2022 All-American Bowl. He committed to Purdue University to play college football.

== College career ==
As a freshman for the Purdue Boilermakers in 2022, Scourton played in 10 games and had 22 tackles and two sacks. As a sophomore in 2023, he led the Big Ten Conference in sacks with 10 and had 50 tackles. After the season, he entered the transfer portal and transferred to Texas A&M University. On December 9, 2024, Scourton announced that he was going to enter the 2025 NFL draft.

== Professional career ==
Pre-draft measurables
Height	Weight	Arm length	Hand span	Wingspan
6 ft 2 3/4 in (1.90 m)	257 lb (117 kg)	33 in (0.84 m)	10 in (0.25 m)	6 ft 8 7/8 in (2.05 m)
All values from NFL Combine

Scourton was selected by the Carolina Panthers with the 51st pick in the second round of the 2025 NFL draft. On August 16, 2025, Scourton suffered a collapsed lung during a joint practice. He played in all 17 games with eight starts as a rookie, recording 47 tackles, one pass deflection, a forced fumble, and a team-leading five sacks.

On July 23, 2026, Scourton suffered a torn ACL in his right knee during the Panthers' first day of training camp, resulting in him being ruled out of the 2026 season.

== NFL career statistics ==
=== Regular season ===
Year	Team	Games		Tackles					Interceptions						Fumbles				
Year	Team	GP	GS	Cmb	Solo	Ast	Sck	TFL	Int	Yds	Avg	Lng	TD	PD	FF	Fmb	FR	Yds	TD
2025	CAR	17	8	47	20	27	5.0	7	0	0	0.0	0	0	1	1	0	0	0	0
Career		17	8	47	20	27	5.0	7	0	0	0.0	0	0	1	1	0	0	0	0

=== Postseason ===
Year	Team	Games		Tackles					Interceptions						Fumbles				
Year	Team	GP	GS	Cmb	Solo	Ast	Sck	TFL	Int	Yds	Avg	Lng	TD	PD	FF	Fmb	FR	Yds	TD
2025	CAR	1	1	1	1	0	0.0	0	0	0	0.0	0	0	0	0	0	0	0	0
Career		1	1	1	1	0	0.0	0	0	0	0.0	0	0	0	0	0	0	0	0
