= Alex Raynor =

American football player

No. 16 – Kentucky Wildcats
- Position: Placekicker
- Class: Redshirt Senior

Personal information
- Born: Kennesaw, Georgia
- Listed height: 6 ft 0 in (1.83 m)
- Listed weight: 185 lb (84 kg)

Career information
- High school: Harrison (Kennesaw, Georgia)
- College: Georgia Southern (2019–2022); Kentucky (2023–present)

Awards and highlights
- First-team All-SEC (2024); SEC Special Teams Player of the Year (2024)
- Stats at ESPN

Alex Raynor is an American college football kicker for the Kentucky Wildcats. He previously played for the Georgia Southern Eagles.

== Early life ==
Raynor attended Harrison High School in Kennesaw, Georgia. He was an unranked recruit and committed to play college football for the Georgia Southern Eagles, joining the team as a walk-on.

== College career ==
=== Georgia Southern ===
After redshirting in his first collegiate season in 2019, Raynor won the starting kicker job in 2020, where he went 40 for 41 on extra points and 18 for 25 on his field goal attempts. In 2021, he hit 20 of 21 extra points and nine of 14 field goal attempts. In 2022, Raynor hit 49 of 50 extra points and went 18 for 20 on field goals for the Eagles. After the season, Raynor entered his name into the NCAA transfer portal.

=== Kentucky ===
Raynor transferred to play for the Kentucky Wildcats. In his team debut in the 2023 season opener, he hit all three of his field goal attempts versus Ball State. In his first season with the Wildcats in 2023, Raynor went 48 for 49 on his extra point attempts and converted on ten of his eleven field goals. In week 3 of the 2024 season, he hit all four of his field goal attempts, including a school record 55-yarder, versus #1 Georgia Bulldogs. In week 4, Raynor converted all five his extra point attempts and both of his field goals in a win over Ohio. During the 2024 season, he converted on 15 of 16 field goals with a long of 55 for the Wildcats. Raynor was named first-team all-SEC, the SEC Special Teams Player of the Year, and was named a finalist for the Lou Groza Award.
