= Eugene Asante =

American football player (born 2001)

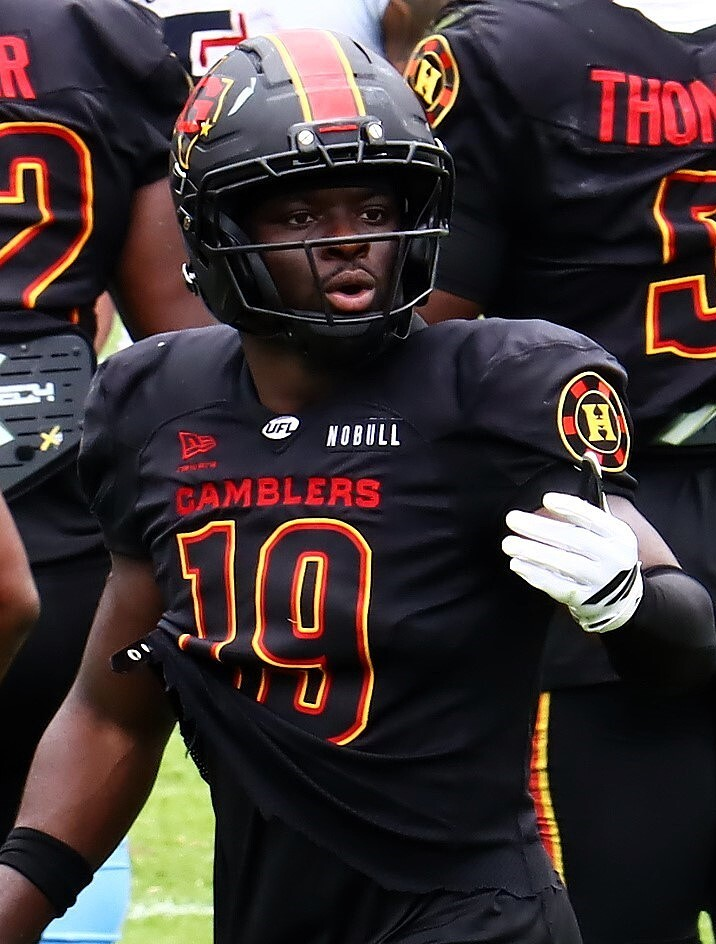
- Asante with the Houston Gamblers in 2026

Profile
- Position: Linebacker

Personal information
- Born: January 22, 2001 (age 25); Alexandria, Virginia, U.S.
- Listed height: 6 ft 0 in (1.83 m)
- Listed weight: 222 lb (101 kg)

Career information
- High school: Westfield (Chantilly, Virginia)
- College: North Carolina (2019–2021); Auburn (2022–2024)
- NFL draft: 2025: undrafted

Career history
- Miami Dolphins (2025)*; Cleveland Browns (2025)*; Atlanta Falcons (2025)*; Houston Gamblers (2026); Arizona Cardinals (2026)*; San Francisco 49ers (2026)*
- * Offseason or practice squad member only

Awards and highlights
- Third-team All-SEC (2023)
- Stats at Pro Football Reference

Eugene Asante (born January 22, 2001) is an American professional football linebacker. He played college football for the North Carolina Tar Heels and Auburn Tigers.

== Early life ==
Asante grew up in Alexandria, Virginia. His parents are Ghanaian immigrants and his older brother Larry played five seasons in the NFL. Asante played football at Westfield High School in Chantilly, Virginia where he was named the defensive player of the year for Northern Virginia as a senior. A four star prospect, he committed to play college football at the University of North Carolina (UNC) over in-state Virginia Tech.

== College career ==
Asante primarily played special teams in his first season at UNC, recording 12 tackles on the season, 8 of which came against Mercer, when he led the team in tackles. In 2020, he made his first career start against Virginia Tech and in the Orange Bowl against Texas A&M had a game-high 10 tackles. Following the 2021 season he announced that he would be transferring to Auburn University. Asante appeared in the first four games on the season in 2022, before being placed on the practice squad by then-head coach Bryan Harsin. Asante would become a leader of the Tigers defense in 2023. In Week 2 against California, Asante recorded 12 tackles and a sack as the Tigers won 14–10. For his performance he was named the SEC co-defensive player of the week.

== Professional career ==
Pre-draft measurables
Height	Weight	Arm length	Hand span	Wingspan	40-yard dash	10-yard split	20-yard split	20-yard shuttle	Three-cone drill	Bench press
6 ft 0 1/2 in (1.84 m)	223 lb (101 kg)	30 1/4 in (0.77 m)	8 1/4 in (0.21 m)	6 ft 1 1/2 in (1.87 m)	4.48 s	1.52 s	2.61 s	4.27 s	7.15 s	21 reps
All values from NFL Combine/Pro Day

=== Miami Dolphins ===
On May 9, 2025, Asante signed with the Miami Dolphins as an undrafted free agent after going unselected in the 2025 NFL draft. He was waived on August 26 with an injury designation as part of final roster cuts.

=== Cleveland Browns ===
On October 14, 2025, Asante signed with the Cleveland Browns' practice squad. He was released on December 2.

=== Atlanta Falcons ===
On December 23, 2025, Asante was signed to the Atlanta Falcons' practice squad.

=== Houston Gamblers ===
On January 13, 2026, Asante was selected by the Houston Gamblers in the 2026 UFL Draft.

=== Arizona Cardinals ===
On August 9, 2026, Asante signed with the Arizona Cardinals. On August 26, Asante was waived by Arizona as a part of final roster cuts; he was re-signed to the team's practice squad the following day. He was released on October 13.

=== San Francisco 49ers ===
On October 15, 2026, Asante was signed to the San Francisco 49ers' practice squad. He was released on October 21.
