= Danny Stutsman =

American football player (born 2003)

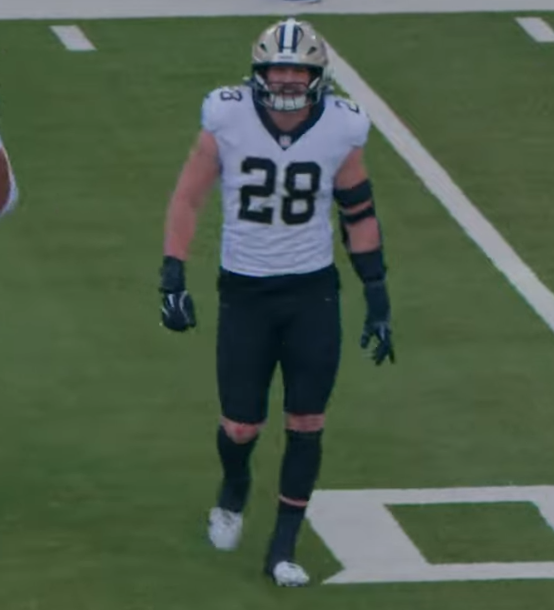
- Stutsman in 2025

No. 28 – New Orleans Saints
- Position: Linebacker
- Roster status: Active

Personal information
- Born: March 10, 2003 (age 23); Boca Raton, Florida, U.S.
- Listed height: 6 ft 3 in (1.91 m)
- Listed weight: 233 lb (106 kg)

Career information
- High school: Foundation Academy (Winter Garden, Florida)
- College: Oklahoma (2021–2024)
- NFL draft: 2025: 4th round, 112th overall pick

Career history
- New Orleans Saints (2025–present)

Awards and highlights
- Consensus All-American (2024); First-team All-SEC (2024); First-team All-Big 12 (2023)

Career NFL statistics as of Week 2, 2026
- Tackles: 63
- Stats at Pro Football Reference

Danny Stutsman (born March 10, 2003) is an American professional football linebacker for the New Orleans Saints of the National Football League (NFL). He played college football for the Oklahoma Sooners and was selected by the Saints in the fourth round of the 2025 NFL draft.

== Early life ==
Stutsman was born in Boca Raton, Florida. He attended Foundation Academy in Winter Garden, Florida. As a junior, Stutsman recorded 110 tackles. In addition, he also added 44 receptions for 891 yards, and 12 touchdowns. Stutsman finished his high school career with totals of 333 tackles, 20 sacks, and eight forced fumbles. A three-star recruit, he committed to play college football at the University of Oklahoma.

== College career ==
As a freshman in 2021, Stutsman played in ten games, tallying 38 tackles, one sack, and two forced fumbles. The following season, his 125 total tackles led the Big 12, while also posting three sacks, and two interceptions. Against Texas Tech, Stutsman recorded 18 tackles, a career high. Entering the 2023 season, Stutsman was seen as a top prospect for the 2024 NFL draft. On December 11, 2023, Stutsman announced that he would be returning for his senior season, despite expectations he would declare for the 2024 draft.

=== College statistics ===
Season	GP	Tackles					Interceptions					Fumbles			
Season	GP	Solo	Ast	Cmb	TfL	Sck	Int	Yds	Avg	TD	PD	FR	Yds	TD	FF
2021	10	21	17	38	2.0	1.0	0	0	0.0	0	0	0	0	0	2
2022	13	68	57	125	11.0	3.0	2	40	20.0	0	5	0	0	0	0
2023	12	51	53	104	16.0	3.0	1	30	30.0	1	3	1	0	0	2
2024	12	44	65	109	8.0	1.0	0	0	0.0	0	0	0	0	0	0
Career	47	184	192	376	37.0	8.0	3	70	23.3	1	8	1	0	0	4

== Professional career ==
Pre-draft measurables
Height	Weight	Arm length	Hand span	Wingspan	40-yard dash	10-yard split	20-yard split	Vertical jump	Bench press
6 ft 3 1/4 in (1.91 m)	233 lb (106 kg)	32 1/8 in (0.82 m)	9 in (0.23 m)	6 ft 5 1/2 in (1.97 m)	4.52 s	1.55 s	2.63 s	34.0 in (0.86 m)	22 reps
All values from NFL Combine/Pro Day

Stutsman was selected in the fourth round, with the 112th pick by the New Orleans Saints at the 2025 NFL draft.
