= 2024 Florida Gators football team =

American college football season

2024 Florida Gators football

Gasparilla Bowl champion

Gasparilla Bowl, W 33–8 vs. Tulane
- Conference: Southeastern Conference
- Record: 8–5 (4–4 SEC)
- Head coach: Billy Napier (3rd season)
- Co-offensive coordinators: Rob Sale (3rd season); Russ Callaway (1st season)
- Offensive scheme: Pro-style
- Defensive coordinator: Austin Armstrong (2nd season)
- Co-defensive coordinator: Ron Roberts (1st season)
- Base defense: 4–2–5
- Home stadium: Ben Hill Griffin Stadium

2024 Southeastern Conference football standings
	Conf.			Overall
Team	W		L	W		L
No. 4 Texas y^	7	–	1	13	–	3
No. 6 Georgia y$^	6	–	2	11	–	3
No. 9 Tennessee ^	6	–	2	10	–	3
No. 22 Missouri	5	–	3	10	–	3
No. 11 Ole Miss	5	–	3	10	–	3
No. 17 Alabama	5	–	3	9	–	4
No. 19 South Carolina	5	–	3	9	–	4
LSU	5	–	3	9	–	4
Texas A&M	5	–	3	8	–	5
Florida	4	–	4	8	–	5
Arkansas	3	–	5	7	–	6
Vanderbilt	3	–	5	7	–	6
Oklahoma	2	–	6	6	–	7
Auburn	2	–	6	5	–	7
Kentucky	1	–	7	4	–	8
Mississippi State	0	–	8	2	–	10
Championship: Georgia 22, Texas 19 ^{OT}
^ – College Football Playoff participant; $ – Conference champion; y – Championship game participant; Rankings from AP Poll

The 2024 Florida Gators football team represented the University of Florida as a member of the Southeastern Conference (SEC) during the 2024 NCAA Division I FBS football season. The Gators were led by third-year head coach Billy Napier and played their home games at Ben Hill Griffin Stadium located in Gainesville, Florida.

The Gators entered the season with one of the most difficult schedules in the history of college football. After opening the season with a loss to Miami and a win over Samford, conference play began with a 33-20 home loss to the Texas A&M Aggies, calling into question the future of head coach Billy Napier. Florida would win their next 2 games, on the road at Mississippi State and a home game against UCF, before losing a close game to No. 8 Tennessee, amplifying the discussion around a potential coaching change. Florida proceeded to win its next game against Kentucky, before losses to No. 2 Georgia and No. 5 Texas. However, the team would rallied towards the end of the season, upsetting No. 22 LSU and No. 9 Ole Miss in back to back games. The Florida Gators would finish on a three-game winning streak, beating their in-state rival, the Florida State Seminoles on the road in Tallahassee, their first win in this rivalry since 2021 and their first at Doak Campbell Stadium since 2018. This also marked Florida's first regular-season winning record since 2020. With a win over Tulane in the Gasparilla Bowl, Florida would win their first bowl game since 2019.

== Offseason ==
Positions key
Offense	Defense	Special teams
QB — Quarterback; RB — Running back; FB — Fullback; WR — Wide receiver; TE — Tight end; OL — Offensive lineman; T — Tackle; G — Guard; C — Center	DL — Defensive lineman; DT — Defensive tackle (Note: Includes nose tackle (NT)); DE — Defensive end; EDGE — Edge rusher; LB — Linebacker (Note: Includes middle linebacker (MLB/MIKE), weakside linebacker (WILL), strongside linebacker (SAM), off-ball linebacker, and outside linebacker (OLB)); DB — Defensive back; CB — Cornerback; S — Safety (Note: Includes free safety (FS) and strong safety (SS))	K — Kicker (Note: Also known as a placekicker (PK)); P — Punter; LS — Long snapper; RS — Return specialist (Note: Includes kickoff and punt returners)

=== Coaching staff changes ===
Name	Position	Reason	Replacement
Sean Spencer	Defensive line coach	Fired	Gerald Chatman
Corey Raymond	Secondary coach	Fired	Will Harris
Jay Bateman	Linebackers coach	Accepted job at Texas A&M	Ron Roberts
Darnell Stapleton	Co-offensive line coach	Accepted job at Washington Commanders	

==== Coaching staff additions ====
Name	Previous position	New position
Jonathan Decoster	Offensive assistant (Cleveland Browns)	Assistant Offensive line coach
Gerald Chatman	Defensive line Coach (Tulane)	Defensive line coach
Ron Roberts	Defensive Coordinator (Auburn)	Linebackers coach, Co-defensive coordinator, Executive defensive head coach
Will Harris	Assistant defensive backs coach (Los Angeles Chargers)	Secondary coach

=== Team departures ===
Overall, thirty-seven Florida players left the program during or after the 2023 season. 6 players graduated, 1 medically retired, 6 players declared for the NFL draft, while the other 24 players entered the transfer portal. Of those twenty-four, 22 have found new teams while 2 have not.

Name	Position	Class	Reason
Jack Miller III	QB	So	Retired
Dante Zanders	TE	Sr	Graduated
Teradja Mitchell	LB	Sr	Graduated
Daniel Cross	WR	Sr	Graduated
Kenny Anyaehie	LB	Sr	Graduated
Jaelin Humphries	DL	Jr	Graduated
Dakota Mitchell	S	So	Medically Retired

==== Entered NFL draft ====
Player	Position	Class
Kingsley Eguakun	C	Jr
Ricky Pearsall	WR	Sr
Micah Leon	QB	Grad Student
Eddie Battle	RB	Sr
Jacob Watkins	P	Sr
Lyndell Hudson II	OL	Sr

==== Transfer Portal ====
Twenty-one Florida players will be playing for new teams in the 2024 season after entering the NCAA Transfer Portal. Over the off-season, Florida added thirteen players from the transfer portal.

===== Departing transfers =====
Player	Position	Destination
Max Brown	QB	Charlotte
Caleb Douglas	WR	Texas Tech
Richie Leonard IV	OL	Florida State
Scooby Williams	LB	Texas A&M
Jaydon Hill	CB	Texas A&M
Micah Mazzcua	OL	Nebraska
Jalen Kimber	CB	Penn State
Miguel Mitchell	S	Arkansas
Will Norman	DL	Marshall
Trevor Etienne	RB	Georgia
Princely Umanmielen	EDGE	Ole Miss
Keenan Landry	DL	Louisiana Tech
Jalen Farmer	OL	Kentucky
Andrew Savaiinaea	TE	Nevada
Jordan Herman	OT	Charlotte
Jonathan Odom	TE	Eastern Michigan
Kamari Wilson	S	Arizona State
Chris McClellan	DL	Missouri
Jadarrius Perkins	CB	Toledo
Thai Chiaokhiao-Bowman	WR	Rice
Mannie Nunnery	LB	Texas State
Carlson Joseph	RB	Mars Hill

Additionally, the following players are currently in the transfer portal and have not committed to a new school for the 2024 season.

Player	Position
Ara Emerzian	P
Adam Mihalek	K

==== Incoming transfers ====
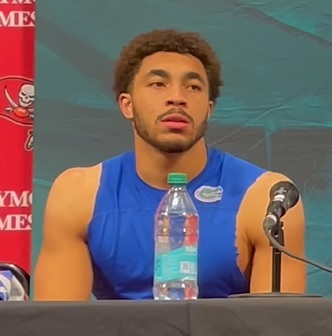
WR Chimere Dike transferred in from Wisconsin.

Player	Position	Former Team
Jameer Grimsley	CB	Alabama
Asa Turner	S	Washington
Grayson Howard	LB	South Carolina
Clay Millen	QB	Colorado State
George Gumbs Jr.	EDGE	Northern Illinois
DJ Douglas	S	Tulane
Trikweze Bridges	CB	Oregon
Devon Manuel	OT	Arkansas
Chimere Dike	WR	Wisconsin
Brandon Crenshaw-Dickson	OT	San Diego State
Joey Slackman	DL	Penn
Caleb Rillos	TE	Air Force
Aidan Warner	QB	Yale
Elijhah Badger	WR	Arizona State
Jason Zandamela	C	USC
Cormani McClain	CB	Colorado

=== Recruiting class ===
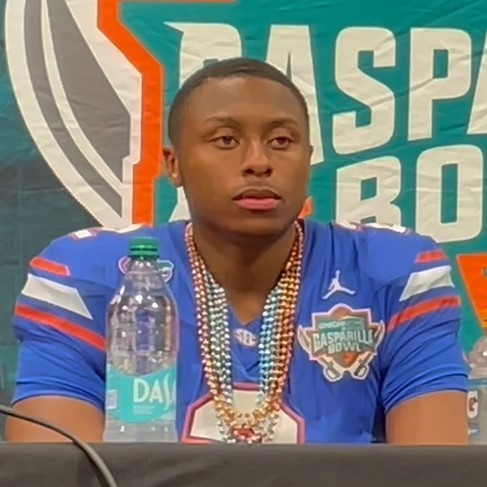
Highly-rated recruit DJ Lagway ended-up starting for the Gators and earned the MVP of the 2024 Gasparilla Bowl.

College recruiting information
Name	Hometown	School	Height	Weight	Commit date
DJ Lagway; Quarterback	Willis, TX	Willis High School	6 ft 3 in (1.91 m)	225 lb (102 kg)	Dec 7, 2022
DJ Lagway; Quarterback	Recruit ratings: Rivals: 247Sports: ESPN: (91)				
LJ McCray; Defensive Lineman	Daytona Beach, FL	Mainland High School	6 ft 7 in (2.01 m)	265 lb (120 kg)	Oct 21, 2023
LJ McCray; Defensive Lineman	Recruit ratings: Rivals: 247Sports: ESPN: (91)				
Myles Graham; Linebacker	Gainesville, FL	Buchholz High School	6 ft 2 in (1.88 m)	220 lb (100 kg)	Aug 14, 2022
Myles Graham; Linebacker	Recruit ratings: Rivals: 247Sports: ESPN: (85)				
Fletcher Westphal; Offensive Tackle	Leesburg, VA	Tuscarora High School	6 ft 8 in (2.03 m)	330 lb (150 kg)	Jul 10, 2023
Fletcher Westphal; Offensive Tackle	Recruit ratings: Rivals: 247Sports: ESPN: (82)				
Kahnen "KD" Daniels; Running Back	West Point, MS	West Point High School	6 ft 0 in (1.83 m)	190 lb (86 kg)	Apr 10, 2023
Kahnen "KD" Daniels; Running Back	Recruit ratings: Rivals: 247Sports: ESPN: (81)				
Jerrae "Tank" Hawkins; Wide Receiver	Bradenton, FL	IMG Academy	5 ft 10 in (1.78 m)	170 lb (77 kg)	Jun 26, 2023
Jerrae "Tank" Hawkins; Wide Receiver	Recruit ratings: Rivals: 247Sports: ESPN: (82)				
Gregory Smith III; Quarterback / Safety	Riverview, FL	Sumner High School	6 ft 4 in (1.93 m)	195 lb (88 kg)	Dec 20, 2023
Gregory Smith III; Quarterback / Safety	Recruit ratings: Rivals: 247Sports: ESPN: (79)				
Tawaski TJ Abrams; Wide Receiver	Fort Myers, FL	Dunbar High School	5 ft 11 in (1.80 m)	180 lb (82 kg)	Jul 18, 2023
Tawaski TJ Abrams; Wide Receiver	Recruit ratings: Rivals: 247Sports: ESPN: (81)				
Josiah Davis; Safety	Nashville, GA	Berrien County High School	6 ft 1 in (1.85 m)	190 lb (86 kg)	Mar 27, 2023
Josiah Davis; Safety	Recruit ratings: Rivals: 247Sports: ESPN: (79)				
Mike Williams; Offensive Tackle	Upper Marlboro, MD	Charles Herbert Flowers High School	6 ft 6 in (1.98 m)	330 lb (150 kg)	Jun 12, 2023
Mike Williams; Offensive Tackle	Recruit ratings: Rivals: 247Sports: ESPN: (75)				
Jadan Baugh; Running Back	Olney, MD	Columbia High School	6 ft 1 in (1.85 m)	210 lb (95 kg)	Dec 20, 2023
Jadan Baugh; Running Back	Recruit ratings: Rivals: 247Sports: ESPN: (78)				
D'Ante Robinson; Defensive Lineman	Orlando, FL	Jones High School	6 ft 4 in (1.93 m)	315 lb (143 kg)	Jan 19, 2024
D'Ante Robinson; Defensive Lineman	Recruit ratings: Rivals: 247Sports: ESPN: (80)				
Brien Taylor; Defensive Lineman	Brenham, TX	Blinn College	6 ft 5 in (1.96 m)	260 lb (120 kg)	Dec 11, 2023
Brien Taylor; Defensive Lineman	Recruit ratings: Rivals: 247Sports: ESPN: (78)				
Teddy Foster; Cornerback	Sarasota, FL	Cardinal Mooney High School	6 ft 1 in (1.85 m)	170 lb (77 kg)	Jul 14, 2023
Teddy Foster; Cornerback	Recruit ratings: Rivals: 247Sports: ESPN: (77)				
Michai Boireau; Defensive Lineman	Fairburn, GA	Creekside High School	6 ft 5 in (1.96 m)	375 lb (170 kg)	Dec 2, 2023
Michai Boireau; Defensive Lineman	Recruit ratings: Rivals: 247Sports: ESPN: (79)				
Noel Portnjagin; Inside Offensive Lineman	Karlsruhe, Germany		6 ft 5 in (1.96 m)	330 lb (150 kg)	Jun 14, 2023
Noel Portnjagin; Inside Offensive Lineman	Recruit ratings: Rivals: 247Sports: ESPN: (78)				
Aaron Chiles; Linebacker	Olney, MD	Our Lady of Good Counsel High School	6 ft 3 in (1.91 m)	225 lb (102 kg)	Jun 17, 2023
Aaron Chiles; Linebacker	Recruit ratings: Rivals: 247Sports: ESPN: (86)				
Amir Jackson; Tight End	Portal, GA	Portal High School	6 ft 5 in (1.96 m)	220 lb (100 kg)	Jun 17, 2023
Amir Jackson; Tight End	Recruit ratings: Rivals: 247Sports: ESPN: (84)				
Marcus Mascoll; Offensive Tackle	Snellville, GA	South Gwinnett High School	6 ft 5 in (1.96 m)	295 lb (134 kg)	Jun 19, 2023
Marcus Mascoll; Offensive Tackle	Recruit ratings: Rivals: 247Sports: ESPN: (77)				
Jameer Grimsley; Cornerback	Tampa, FL	Tampa Catholic High School	6 ft 3 in (1.91 m)	185 lb (84 kg)	Jan 21, 2024
Jameer Grimsley; Cornerback	Recruit ratings: Rivals: 247Sports: ESPN: (81)				
Overall recruit ranking:
Note: In many cases, Scout, Rivals, 247Sports, On3, and ESPN may conflict in their listings of height and weight.; In these cases, the average was taken. ESPN grades are on a 100-point scale.; Sources: "Rivals commits". Rivals.; "ESPN commits". ESPN.; "2024 Team Ranking". Rivals.com.; "247Sports commits". 247Sports.

*Jameer Grimsley originally signed to Alabama, but left the program following the departure of head coach Nick Saban.

==== 2024 Overall class rankings ====
Website	National Rank	Conference Rank	5 star recruits	4 star recruits	3 recruits	Total Recruits
ESPN	–	–	2	9	9	30
On3 Recruits	#10	#7	2	11	5	19
Rivals	#15	#8	2	10	7	19
247Sports	#12	#7	2	8	9	19

==== Walk-ons ====
Name	Position	Height/Weight	Hometown	High school (College)
Paul Kessler	QB	6'4.5, 217	Los Angeles, CA	Venice High School
Aidan Warner	QB	6'3, 199	Winter Park, FL	Winter Park High School (Yale)
Hunter Smith	K	5'10, 204	Gainesville, FL	Buchholz High School (FAU)
Jack Muse	P	6'3.5, 195	Hingham, MA	Hingham High School (UMass)
Jake Xeller	ILB	6'2.25, 239	Reston, VA	Herndon High School
Chase Stevens	OL	6'3, 305	Vero Beach, FL	Vero Beach High School

== Schedule ==
Florida and the SEC announced the 2024 football schedule on December 13, 2023.

Date	Time	Opponent	Site	TV	Result	Attendance
August 31	3:30 p.m.	No. 19 Miami (FL)*	Ben Hill Griffin Stadium; Gainesville, FL (rivalry, SEC Nation)	ABC	L 17–41	90,544
September 7	7:00 p.m.	Samford*	Ben Hill Griffin Stadium; Gainesville, FL	SECN+/ESPN+	W 45–7	89,295
September 14	3:30 p.m.	Texas A&M	Ben Hill Griffin Stadium; Gainesville, FL (SEC Nation)	ABC	L 20–33	89,993
September 21	12:00 p.m.	at Mississippi State	Davis Wade Stadium; Starkville, MS	ESPN	W 45–28	49,655
October 5	7:45 p.m.	UCF*	Ben Hill Griffin Stadium; Gainesville, FL	SECN	W 24–13	90,369
October 12	7:00 p.m.	at No. 8 Tennessee	Neyland Stadium; Knoxville, TN (rivalry)	ESPN	L 17–23 ^{OT}	101,915
October 19	7:45 p.m.	Kentucky^{†}	Ben Hill Griffin Stadium; Gainesville, FL (rivalry)	SECN	W 48–20	89,906
November 2	3:30 p.m.	vs. No. 2 Georgia	EverBank Stadium; Jacksonville, FL (rivalry, SEC Nation)	ABC	L 20–34	76,307
November 9	12:00 p.m.	at No. 5 Texas	Darrell K Royal–Texas Memorial Stadium; Austin, TX	ABC	L 17–49	103,375
November 16	3:30 p.m.	No. 22 LSU	Ben Hill Griffin Stadium; Gainesville, FL (rivalry)	ABC	W 27–16	90,067
November 23	12:00 p.m.	No. 9 Ole Miss	Ben Hill Griffin Stadium; Gainesville, FL	ABC	W 24–17	89,942
November 30	7:00 p.m.	at Florida State*	Doak Campbell Stadium; Tallahassee, FL (rivalry)	ESPN2	W 31–11	55,107
December 20	3:30 p.m.	vs. Tulane*	Raymond James Stadium; Tampa, FL (Gasparilla Bowl)	ESPN2	W 33–8	41,472
*Non-conference game; ^{†}Homecoming; Rankings from AP Poll (and CFP Rankings, after November 5) – Released prior to game; All times are in Eastern time

== Rankings ==
Ranking movements Legend: ██ Increase in ranking ██ Decrease in ranking — = Not ranked RV = Received votes
	Week																
Poll	Pre	1	2	3	4	5	6	7	8	9	10	11	12	13	14	15	Final
AP	—	—	—	—	—	—	—	—	—	—	—	—	—	RV	RV	RV	RV
Coaches	RV	—	—	—	—	—	—	—	—	—	—	—	—	—	—	—	—
CFP	Not released										—	—	—	—	—	—	Not released

== Game summaries ==
=== No. 19 Miami (FL) ===
Game one – No. 19 Miami Hurricanes at Florida Gators – Game summary

Quarter	1	2	3	4	Total
No. 19 Hurricanes	7	17	14	3	41
Gators	3	7	0	7	17

at Ben Hill Griffin Stadium • Gainesville, Florida

- Date: August 31
- Game time: 3:45 p.m. EDT
- Game weather: Temperature: 92 °F (33 °C) • Wind: NE at 4 miles per hour (6.4 km/h) • Weather: Sunny
- Game attendance: 90,544
- Referee: Marcus Woods
- TV announcers (ABC): Joe Tessitore (play-by-play), Jesse Palmer (analyst), and Katie George (sideline reporter)
- Boxscore

Game information

First quarter

- Miami – Cam McCormick 9-yard pass from Cameron Ward (Andres Borregales kick), 6:48
- Florida – Trey Smack 41-yard field goal, 0:19

Second quarter

- Miami – Andres Borregales 23-yard field goal, 9:53
- Miami – Mark Fletcher Jr. 10-yard run (Andres Borregales kick), 6:41
- Florida – Montrell Johnson Jr. 71-yard run (Trey Smack kick), 3:21
- Miami – Xavier Restrepo 24-yard pass from Cameron Ward (Andres Borregales kick), 0:45

Third quarter

- Miami – Mark Fletcher Jr. 1 yard run (Andres Borregales kick), 12:25
- Miami – Jacolby George 23-yard pass from Cameron Ward (Andres Borregales kick), 6:08

Fourth quarter

- Florida – Treyaun Webb 1 yard run (Trey Smack kick), 7:14
- Miami – Andres Borregales 26-yard field goal, 4:00

Statistics	MIA	UF
First downs	25	17
Total yards	529	261
Rushing yards	144	139
Passing yards	385	122
Passing: Comp–Att–Int	26–36–1	14–26–2
Time of possession	34:30	25:30

Team	Category	Player	Statistics
Miami (FL)	Passing	Cam Ward	26/36, 385 yards, 3 TD, INT
Miami (FL)	Rushing	Damien Martinez	15 carries, 65 yards
Miami (FL)	Receiving	Xavier Restrepo	7 receptions, 112 yards, TD
Florida	Passing	Graham Mertz	11/20, 91 yards, INT
Florida	Rushing	Montrell Johnson Jr.	11 carries, 106 yards, TD
Florida	Receiving	Eugene Wilson III	7 receptions, 50 yards

=== Samford ===
Game two – Samford Bulldogs (0–1) at Florida Gators (0–1) – Game summary

Quarter	1	2	3	4	Total
Bulldogs	0	0	7	0	7
Gators	7	7	14	17	45

at Ben Hill Griffin Stadium • Gainesville, Florida

- Date: September 7
- Game time: 7:02 p.m. EDT
- Game weather: Sunny
- Game attendance: 89,295
- Referee: Lee Hedrick
- TV announcers (SECN+/ESPN+): Clay Matvick (play-by-play) and Steve Addazio (analyst)
- Boxscore

Game information

First quarter

- Florida – Montrell Johnson Jr. 1 yard run (Trey Smack kick), 2:53

Second quarter

- Florida – Montrell Johnson Jr. 7-yard run (Trey Smack kick), 7:02

Third quarter

- Florida – Tank Hawkins 35-yard pass from DJ Lagway (Trey Smack kick), 13:38
- Samford – Damonta Witherspoon 1 yard run (Forrest Taylor kick), 7:40
- Florida – Aidan Mizell 41-yard pass from DJ Lagway (Trey Smack kick), 5:52

Fourth quarter

- Florida – Trey Smack 25-yard field goal, 13:18
- Florida – Eugene Wilson III 85-yard pass from DJ Lagway (Trey Smack kick), 9:55
- Florida – Aidan Warner 9-yard run (Trey Smack kick), 0:48

Statistics	SAM	UF
First downs	15	22
Total yards	68–205	62–632
Rushing yards	61	166
Passing yards	144	466
Passing: Comp–Att–Int	22–33–0	19–28–0
Time of possession	33:30	26:30

Team	Category	Player	Statistics
Samford	Passing	Quincy Crittendon	22/31, 144 yards
Samford	Rushing	Damonta Witherspoon	9 attempts, 26 yards, 1 touchdown
Samford	Receiving	Brendan Jenkins	4 receptions, 51 yards
Florida	Passing	DJ Lagway	18/25, 456 yards, 3 touchdowns
Florida	Rushing	Montrell Johnson Jr.	15 carries, 67 yards, 2 touchdowns
Florida	Receiving	Eugene Wilson III	6 receptions, 141 yards, 1 touchdown

=== Texas A&M ===
Game three – Texas A&M Aggies (1–1) at Florida Gators (1–1) – Game summary

Quarter	1	2	3	4	Total
Aggies	10	10	13	0	33
Gators	0	0	14	6	20

at Ben Hill Griffin Stadium • Gainesville, Florida

- Date: September 14
- Game time: 3:50 p.m. EDT
- Game weather: Sunny
- Game attendance: 89,993
- Referee: Steve Marlowe
- TV announcers (ABC): Joe Tessitore (play-by-play), Jesse Palmer (analyst), and Katie George (sideline reporter)
- Boxscore

Game information

First quarter

- Texas A&M – Randy Bond 31-yard field goal, 8:14
- Texas A&M – Theo Melin Öhrström 29-yard pass from Marcel Reed (Randy Bond kick), 0:18

Second quarter

- Texas A&M – Randy Bond 48-yard field goal, 9:47
- Texas A&M – Marcel Reed 1 yard run (Randy Bond kick), 0:44

Third quarter

- Florida – Elijhah Badger 14-yard pass from Graham Mertz (Trey Smack kick), 11:49
- Texas A&M – Cyrus Allen 73-yard pass from Marcel Reed, 11:00
- Texas A&M – Bryce Anderson 45-yard interception return (Randy Bond kick), 5:29
- Florida – Chimere Dike 7-yard pass from DJ Lagway (Trey Smack kick), 1:04

Fourth quarter

- Florida – Ja'Kobi Jackson 2-yard run, 5:13

Statistics	TAMU	UF
First downs	27	19
Total yards	488	301
Rushing yards	310	52
Passing yards	178	249
Turnovers	0	3
Time of possession	37:37	22:23

Team	Category	Player	Statistics
Texas A&M	Passing	Marcel Reed	11/17, 178 yards, 2 TD
Texas A&M	Rushing	Le'Veon Moss	18 rushes, 110 yards
Texas A&M	Receiving	Cyrus Allen	3 receptions, 81 yards, TD
Florida	Passing	Graham Mertz	12/15, 195 yards, TD, INT
Florida	Rushing	Treyaun Webb	6 rushes, 37 yards
Florida	Receiving	Elijhah Badger	5 receptions, 94 yards, TD

=== at Mississippi State ===
Game four – Florida Gators (1–2) at Mississippi State Bulldogs (1–2) – Game summary

Quarter	1	2	3	4	Total
Gators	7	21	7	10	45
Bulldogs	7	7	7	7	28

at Davis Wade Stadium • Starkville, Mississippi

- Date: September 21
- Game time: 11:08 a.m. CDT
- Game weather: Temperature: 89 °F (32 °C) • Wind: SE at 2 miles per hour (3.2 km/h) • Weather: Sunny
- Game attendance: 49,655
- Referee: Wayne Winkler
- TV announcers (ESPN): Dave Pasch (play-by-play), Dusty Dvoracek (analyst) and Taylor McGregor (sideline reporter)
- Boxscore

Game information

First quarter

- Florida – Arlis Boardingham 3-yard pass from Graham Mertz (Trey Smack kick), 3:39
- Mississippi State – Davon Booth 1-yard run (Kyle Ferrie kick), 0:21

Second quarter

- Florida – Marcus Burke 20-yard pass from Graham Mertz (Trey Smack kick), 10:56
- Florida – Hayden Hansen 35-yard pass from Graham Mertz (Trey Smack kick), 9:02
- Florida – Ja'Kobi Jackson 10-yard run (Trey Smack kick), 1:17
- Mississippi State – Blake Shapen 3-yard run (Kyle Ferrie kick), 0:23

Third quarter

- Mississippi State – Jordan Mosley 13-yard pass from Blake Shapen (Kyle Ferrie kick), 6:38
- Florida – Graham Mertz 1-yard run (Trey Smack kick), 3:37

Fourth quarter

- Florida – Austin Barber 0-yard run (Trey Smack kick), 8:24
- Mississippi State – Johnnie Daniels 10-yard run (Kyle Ferrie kick), 4:26
- Florida – Trey Smack 47-yard field goal, 2:34

Statistics	UF	MSST
First downs	27	31
Total yards	503	480
Rushing yards	226	240
Passing yards	277	240
Passing: Comp–Att–Int	26–28–0	20–34–0
Time of possession	27:36	32:24

Team	Category	Player	Statistics
Florida	Passing	Graham Mertz	19/21, 201 yards, 3 TD
Florida	Rushing	Montrell Johnson Jr.	15 rushes, 68 yards
Florida	Receiving	Elijhah Badger	3 receptions, 45 yards
Mississippi State	Passing	Blake Shapen	13/21, 140 yards, TD
Mississippi State	Rushing	Johnnie Daniels	14 rushes, 77 yards, TD
Mississippi State	Receiving	Mario Craver	3 receptions, 62 yards

=== UCF ===
Game five – UCF Knights (3–1) at Florida Gators (2–2) – Game summary

Quarter	1	2	3	4	Total
Knights	3	0	3	7	13
Gators	7	17	0	0	24

at Ben Hill Griffin Stadium • Gainesville, Florida

- Date: October 5
- Game time: 7:55 p.m. EDT
- Game weather: Temperature: 76 °F (24 °C) • Wind: NE at 5 miles per hour (8.0 km/h) • Weather: Cloudy
- Game attendance: 90,369
- Referee: Daniel Gautreaux
- TV announcers (SEC Network): Taylor Zarzour (play-by-play), Matt Stinchcomb (analyst) and Tori Petri (sideline reporter)
- Boxscore

Game information

First quarter

- Florida – Elijhah Badger 13-yard pass from Graham Mertz (Trey Smack kick), 7:02
- UCF – Grant Reddick 27-yard field goal, 2:32

Second quarter

- Florida – Ja'Kobi Jackson 1 yard run (Trey Smack kick), 12:50
- Florida – Montrell Johnson Jr. 3-yard run (Trey Smack kick), 1:50
- Florida – Trey Smack 28-yard field goal, 0:04

Third quarter

- UCF – Grant Reddick 37-yard field goal, 6:32

Fourth quarter

- UCF – RJ Harvey 13-yard run (Grant Reddick kick), 7:50

Statistics	UCF	UF
First downs	20	18
Total yards	62–273	60–359
Rushing yards	40–108	32–130
Passing yards	165	229
Passing: Comp–Att–Int	12–22–1	23–28–0
Time of possession	27:44	32:16

Team	Category	Player	Statistics
UCF	Passing	KJ Jefferson	12/22, 165 yards, INT
UCF	Rushing	RJ Harvey	16 carries, 75 yards, TD
UCF	Receiving	Randy Pittman Jr.	3 receptions, 44 yards
Florida	Passing	Graham Mertz	19/23, 179 yards, TD
Florida	Rushing	Montrell Johnson Jr.	10 carries, 54 yards, TD
Florida	Receiving	Chimere Dike	4 receptions, 88 yards

=== at No. 8 Tennessee (rivalry) ===
Game six – Florida Gators (3–2) at No. 8 Tennessee Volunteers (4–1) – Game summary

Quarter	1	2	3	4	OT	Total
Gators	3	0	7	7	0	17
No. 8 Volunteers	0	0	10	7	6	23

at Neyland Stadium • Knoxville, Tennessee

- Date: October 12
- Game time: 7:05 p.m. EDT
- Game weather: Temperature: 68 °F (20 °C) • Wind: W at 1 mile per hour (1.6 km/h) • Weather: Clear
- Game attendance: 101,915
- Referee: Wayne Winkler
- TV announcers (ESPN): Bob Wischusen (play-by-play), Louis Riddick (analyst), and Kris Budden (sideline)
- Boxscore

Game information

First quarter

- Florida – Trey Smack 42-yard field goal, 3:15

Third quarter

- Florida – Arlis Boardingham 13-yard pass from Graham Mertz (Trey Smack kick), 7:18
- Tennessee – Dylan Sampson 6-yard run (Max Gilbert kick), 2:57
- Tennessee – Max Gilbert 35-yard field goal, 1:37

Fourth quarter

- Tennessee – Dylan Sampson 23-yard run (Max Gilbert kick), 9:42
- Florida – Chimere Dike 27-yard pass from DJ Lagway (Trey Smack kick), 0:29

Overtime

- Tennessee – Dylan Sampson 1 yard run

Statistics	UF	TENN
First downs	22	18
Total yards	72–361	69–312
Rushes/yards	40–138	43–143
Passing yards	223	169
Passing: Comp–Att–Int	20–32–1	16–26–1
Time of possession	34:56	25:04

Team	Category	Player	Statistics
Florida	Passing	Graham Mertz	11/15, 125 yards, TD
Florida	Rushing	Montrell Johnson Jr.	12 carries, 85 yards
Florida	Receiving	Chimere Dike	4 receptions, 76 yards, TD
Tennessee	Passing	Nico Iamaleava	16/26, 169 yards, INT
Tennessee	Rushing	Dylan Sampson	27 carries, 112 yards, 3 TD
Tennessee	Receiving	Squirrel White	5 receptions, 71 yards

=== Kentucky (rivalry) ===
Game seven – Kentucky Wildcats (3–3) at Florida Gators (3–3) – Game summary

Quarter	1	2	3	4	Total
Wildcats	0	13	7	0	20
Gators	3	24	7	14	48

at Ben Hill Griffin Stadium • Gainesville, Florida

- Date: October 19
- Game time: 7:55 p.m. EDT
- Game weather: Sunny
- Game attendance: 89,906
- Referee: Lee Hedrick
- TV announcers (SECN): Dave Neal (play-by-play), Aaron Murray (analyst), and Marilyn Payne (sideline reporter)
- Boxscore

Game information

First quarter

- Florida – Trey Smack 29-yard field goal, 10:27

Second quarter

- Florida – Trey Smack 33-yard field goal, 14:13
- Kentucky – Barion Brown 45-yard pass from Brock Vandagriff, 12:05
- Florida – Jadan Baugh 4-yard run (Trey Smack kick), 8:15
- Florida – Jadan Baugh 10-yard run (Trey Smack kick), 2:10
- Florida – Jadan Baugh 1 yard run (Trey Smack kick), 1:44
- Kentucky – Barion Brown 99-yard kickoff return (Alex Raynor kick), 1:30

Third quarter

- Kentucky – Gavin Wimsatt 1 yard run (Alex Raynor kick), 8:34
- Florida – Jadan Baugh 1 yard run (Trey Smack kick), 3:27

Fourth quarter

- Florida – Jadan Baugh 1 yard run (Trey Smack kick), 3:31
- Florida – Cormani McClain 29-yard interception return (Trey Smack kick), 3:23

Statistics	UK	UF
First downs	17	16
Total yards	68–309	59–476
Rushing yards	36–144	44–197
Passing yards	165	279
Passing: Comp–Att–Int	12–32–3	8–15–1
Time of possession	29:56	30:04

Team	Category	Player	Statistics
Kentucky	Passing	Brock Vandagriff	12/26, 165 yards, TD, 2 INT
Kentucky	Rushing	Demie Sumo-Karngbaye	10 carries, 39 yards
Kentucky	Receiving	Barion Brown	2 receptions, 56 yards, TD
Florida	Passing	DJ Lagway	7/14, 259 yards, INT
Florida	Rushing	Jadan Baugh	22 carries, 106 yards, 5 TD
Florida	Receiving	Elijhah Badger	3 receptions, 148 yards

=== at No. 2 Georgia (rivalry) ===
Game eight – Florida Gators (4–3) vs. No. 2 Georgia Bulldogs (6–1) – Game summary

Quarter	1	2	3	4	Total
Gators	0	13	0	7	20
No. 2 Bulldogs	3	3	14	14	34

at EverBank Stadium • Jacksonville, Florida

- Date: November 2
- Game time: 3:50 p.m. EDT
- Game weather: Temperature: 82 °F (28 °C) • Wind: SW at 11 miles per hour (18 km/h) • Weather: Sunny
- Game attendance: 76,307
- Referee: Daniel Gautreaux
- TV announcers (ABC): Chris Fowler (play-by-play), Kirk Herbstreit (analyst), and Holly Rowe (sideline reporter)
- Boxscore

Game information

First quarter

- Georgia – Peyton Woodring 23-yard field goal, 2:10

Second quarter

- Florida – Aidan Mizell 43-yard pass from DJ Lagway (Trey Smack kick), 13:42
- Florida – Trey Smack 32-yard field goal, 7:22
- Georgia – Peyton Woodring 53-yard field goal, 0:43
- Florida – Trey Smack 53-yard field goal, 0:03

Third quarter

- Georgia – Nate Frazier 2-yard run (Peyton Woodring kick), 7:01
- Georgia – Cash Jones 22-yard pass from Carson Beck (Peyton Woodring kick), 1:20

Fourth quarter

- Florida – Ja'Kobi Jackson 15-yard run (Trey Smack kick), 7:29
- Georgia – Dominic Lovett 10-yard pass from Carson Beck (Peyton Woodring kick), 4:01
- Georgia – Dwight Phillips Jr. 4-yard run (Peyton Woodring kick), 3:03

Statistics	UF	UGA
First downs	13	26
Total yards	68–228	73–455
Rushing yards	38–115	33–146
Passing yards	113	309
Passing: Comp–Att–Int	9–30–1	25–40–3
Time of possession	26:25	33:30

Team	Category	Player	Statistics
Florida	Passing	Aidan Warner	7/22, 66 yards, 1 interception
Florida	Rushing	Ja'Kobi Jackson	12 attempts, 74 yards, 1 touchdown
Florida	Receiving	Aidan Mizell	4 receptions, 66 yards, 1 touchdown
Georgia	Passing	Carson Beck	25/40, 309 yards, 2 touchdowns, 3 interceptions
Georgia	Rushing	Nate Frazier	19 attempts, 82 yards, 1 touchdown
Georgia	Receiving	Arian Smith	2 receptions, 59 yards

=== at No. 5 Texas ===
Game nine – Florida Gators (4–4) at No. 5 Texas Longhorns (7–1) – Game summary

Quarter	1	2	3	4	Total
Gators	0	0	10	7	17
No. 5 Longhorns	14	21	7	7	49

at Darrell K Royal–Texas Memorial Stadium • Austin, Texas

- Date: November 9
- Game time: 11:07 a.m. CST
- Game weather: Temperature: 66 °F (19 °C) • Weather: Sunny
- Game attendance: 103,375
- Referee: Lee Hedrick
- TV announcers (ABC): Joe Tessitore (play-by-play), Jesse Palmer (analyst), and Katie George (sideline reporter)
- Boxscore

Game information

First quarter

- Texas – Matthew Golden 29-yard pass from Quinn Ewers (Bert Auburn kick), 3:43
- Texas – Gunnar Helm 22-yard pass from Quinn Ewers (Bert Auburn kick), 3:11

Second quarter

- Texas – Quintrevion Wisner 50-yard pass from Quinn Ewers (Bert Auburn kick), 5:54
- Texas – Matthew Golden 32-yard pass from Quinn Ewers (Bert Auburn kick), 1:19
- Texas – Jaydon Blue 5-yard run (Bert Auburn kick), 0:23

Third quarter

- Texas – Isaiah Bond 34-yard pass from Quinn Ewers (Bert Auburn kick), 12:52
- Florida – Trey Smack 23-yard field goal, 7:03
- Florida – Jadan Baugh 2-yard run (Trey Smack kick), 1:30

Fourth quarter

- Texas – Jerrick Gibson 14-yard run (Bert Auburn kick), 14:55
- Florida – Ja'Kobi Jackson 7-yard run (Trey Smack kick), 8:27

Statistics	UF	TEX
First downs	20	23
Total yards	66–329	64–562
Rushing yards	41–197	31–210
Passing yards	132	352
Passing: Comp–Att–Int	12–25–2	22–33–0
Time of possession	32:06	27:54

Team	Category	Player	Statistics
Florida	Passing	Aidan Warner	12/25, 132 yards, 2 interceptions
Florida	Rushing	Ja'Kobi Jackson	19 attempts, 116 yards, 1 touchdown
Florida	Receiving	Chimere Dike	5 receptions, 95 yards
Texas	Passing	Quinn Ewers	19/27, 333 yards, 5 touchdowns
Texas	Rushing	Jerrick Gibson	16 attempts, 100 yards, 1 touchdown
Texas	Receiving	Jaydon Blue	3 receptions, 67 yards

=== No. 22 LSU (rivalry) ===
Game ten – No. 22 LSU Tigers (6–3) at Florida Gators (4–5) – Game summary

Quarter	1	2	3	4	Total
No. 22 Tigers	0	10	3	3	16
Gators	7	3	3	14	27

at Ben Hill Griffin Stadium • Gainesville, Florida

- Date: November 16
- Game time: 3:45 p.m. EST
- Game weather: Temperature: 76 °F (24 °C) • Wind: NE at 2 miles per hour (3.2 km/h) • Weather: Sunny
- Game attendance: 90,067
- Referee: Jeff Heaser
- TV announcers (ABC): Dave Pasch (play-by-play), Dusty Dvoracek (analyst) and Taylor McGregor (sideline reporter)
- Boxscore

Game information

First quarter

- Florida – Elijhah Badger 23-yard pass from DJ Lagway (Trey Smack kick), 7:12

Second quarter

- LSU – Aaron Anderson 28-yard pass from Garrett Nussmeier (Damian Ramos kick), 7:39
- Florida – Trey Smack 49-yard field goal, 3:27
- LSU – Damian Ramos 50-yard field goal, 0:10

Third quarter

- LSU – Damian Ramos 45-yard field goal, 5:54
- Florida – Trey Smack 55-yard field goal, 3:07

Fourth quarter

- Florida – Ja'Kobi Jackson 1 yard run (Trey Smack kick), 13:58
- LSU – Damian Ramos 38-yard field goal, 5:18
- Florida – Jadan Baugh 55-yard run (Trey Smack kick), 3:48

Statistics	LSU	UF
First downs	25	13
Total yards	92–390	43–339
Rushing yards	44–128	17–113
Passing yards	262	226
Passing: Comp–Att–Int	28–48–0	13–16–0
Time of possession	41:43	18:17

Team	Category	Player	Statistics
LSU	Passing	Garrett Nussmeier	27/47, 260 yards, 1 touchdown
LSU	Rushing	Caden Durham	21 attempts, 95 yards
LSU	Receiving	Aaron Anderson	7 receptions, 72 yards, 1 touchdown
Florida	Passing	DJ Lagway	13/26, 226 yards, 1 touchdown
Florida	Rushing	Jadan Baugh	6 attempts, 65 yards, 1 touchdown
Florida	Receiving	Elijhah Badger	6 receptions, 131 yards, 1 touchdown

=== No. 9 Ole Miss ===
Game eleven – No. 9 Ole Miss Rebels (8–2) at Florida Gators (5–5) – Game summary

Quarter	1	2	3	4	Total
No. 9 Rebels	0	14	3	0	17
Gators	0	14	3	7	24

at Ben Hill Griffin Stadium • Gainesville, Florida

- Date: November 23
- Game time: 12:07 p.m. EST
- Game weather: Sunny
- Game attendance: 89,942
- Referee: Daniel Gautraux
- TV announcers (ABC): Bob Wischusen (play-by-play), Greg McElroy (analyst), and Molly McGrath (sideline reporter)
- Boxscore

Game information

Second quarter

- Florida – Elijhah Badger 8-yard pass from DJ Lagway (Trey Smack kick), 14:56
- Ole Miss – Tre Harris 43-yard pass from Jaxson Dart (Caden Davis kick), 12:01
- Florida – Cayden Lee 22-yard pass from Jaxson Dart (Caden Davis kick), 9:05
- Florida – Jadan Baugh 25-yard pass from DJ Lagway (Trey Smack kick), 6:52

Third quarter

- Florida – Trey Smack 53-yard field goal, 10:57
- Ole Miss – Caden Davis 42-yard field goal, 0:45

Fourth quarter

- Florida – Montrell Johnson Jr. 9-yard run (Trey Smack kick), 7:40

Statistics	MISS	UF
First downs	24	19
Total yards	77–464	63–344
Rushing yards	35–141	45–164
Passing yards	323	180
Passing: Comp–Att–Int	24–42–2	10–18–1
Time of possession	30:03	29:28

Team	Category	Player	Statistics
Ole Miss	Passing	Jaxson Dart	24/41, 323 yards, 2 touchdowns, 2 interceptions
Ole Miss	Rushing	Jaxson Dart	14 attempts, 71 yards
Ole Miss	Receiving	Cayden Lee	6 receptions, 94 yards, 1 touchdown
Florida	Passing	DJ Lagway	10/17, 180 yards, 2 touchdowns, 1 interception
Florida	Rushing	Montrell Johnson Jr.	18 attempts, 107 yards, 1 touchdown
Florida	Receiving	Elijhah Badger	5 receptions, 87 yards, 1 touchdown

=== Florida State (rivalry) ===
Game twelve – Florida Gators (6–5) at Florida State Seminoles (2–9) – Game summary

Quarter	1	2	3	4	Total
Gators	7	7	3	14	31
Seminoles	0	0	3	8	11

at Doak Campbell Stadium • Tallahassee, FL

- Date: November 30
- Game time: 7:10 p.m. EST
- Game weather: Temperature: 45 °F (7 °C) • Wind: calm • Weather: clear
- Game attendance: 55,107
- Referee: Steve Marlowe
- TV announcers (ESPN2): Jay Alter (play-by-play), Rocky Boiman (analyst) and Ashley Stroehlein (sideline)
- Boxscore

Game information

First quarter

- Florida – Ja'Kobi Jackson 1 yard run (Trey Smack kick), 2:28

Second quarter

- Florida – Marcus Burke 4-yard reception from DJ Lagway (Trey Smack kick), 0:25

Third quarter

- Florida State – Ryan Fitzgerald 39-yard field goal, 9:47
- Florida – Trey Smack 30-yard field goal, 6:27

Fourth quarter

- Florida – Montrell Johnson Jr. 65-yard run (Trey Smack kick), 12:38
- Florida State – Lawrance Toafili 2-yard rush (Luke Kromenhoek pass to Landen Thomas), 3:18
- Florida – Tony Livingston 8-yard pass from DJ Lagway (Trey Smack kick), 2:03

Statistics	UF	FSU
First downs	18	20
Total yards	368	239
Rushing yards	235	99
Passing yards	133	140
Passing: Comp–Att–Int	14–22–1	15–28–0
Time of possession	27:08	32:52

Team	Category	Player	Statistics
Florida	Passing	DJ Lagway	14/22, 133 yards, 2 TD, INT
Florida	Rushing	Montrell Johnson Jr.	10 carries, 99 yards, TD
Florida	Receiving	Chimere Dike	3 receptions, 63 yards
Florida State	Passing	Luke Kromenhoek	15/28, 140 yards
Florida State	Rushing	Lawrance Toafili	9 carries, 43 yards, TD
Florida State	Receiving	Lawrance Toafili	3 receptions, 39 yards

=== Tulane (Gasparilla Bowl) ===
2024 Gasparilla Bowl
Tulane Green Wave (9–4, 7–1) at Florida Gators (7–5, 4–4)

Quarter	1	2	3	4	Total
Green Wave	0	0	0	8	8
Gators	3	3	10	17	33

at Raymond James Stadium, Tampa, Florida

- Date: December 20
- Game time: 3:36 p.m. EST
- Game weather: Temperature: 66 °F (19 °C) • Wind: NW at 15 miles per hour (24 km/h) • Weather: Sunny
- Game attendance: 41,472
- Referee: Matt Packowski
- TV announcers (ESPN): Anish Shroff (play-by-play), Andre Ware (analyst), Paul Carcaterra (sideline reporter)
- Boxscore

Game information

First Quarter

- Florida – Trey Smack 34-yard field goal, 7:48

Second Quarter

- Florida – Trey Smack 44-yard field goal, 9:12

Third Quarter

- Florida – Trey Smack 24-yard field goal, 9:11
- Florida – Tony Livingston 7-yard pass from DJ Lagway (Trey Smack kick), 4:03

Fourth Quarter

- Florida – Trey Smack 30-yard field goal, 13:03
- Florida – KD Daniels 25-yard run (Trey Smack kick), 6:29
- Florida – Anthony Rubio 9-yard run (Trey Smack kick), 1:11
- Tulane – Mario Williams 16-yard pass from Ty Thompson (Zycarl Lewis Jr. kick), 0:29

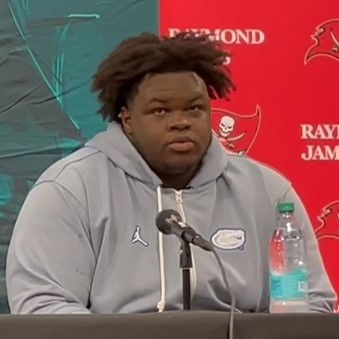
449-lb defensive tackle Desmond Watson was given an opportunity to run the ball towards the end of the Gasparilla Bowl.

Statistics	TULN	UF
First downs	11	26
Total yards	57–194	79–529
Rushing yards	27–69	44–224
Passing yards	125	305
Passing: Comp–Att–Int	11–30–3	22–35–2
Time of possession	21:03	38:57

Team	Category	Player	Statistics
Tulane	Passing	Ty Thompson	11/29, 125 yards, 1 touchdown, 3 interceptions
Tulane	Rushing	Makhi Hughes	8 attempts, 29 yards
Tulane	Receiving	Mario Williams	6 receptions, 91 yards, 1 touchdown
Florida	Passing	DJ Lagway	22/35, 305 yards, 1 touchdown, 2 interceptions
Florida	Rushing	Jadan Baugh	14 attempts, 70 yards
Florida	Receiving	Chimere Dike	6 receptions, 96 yards

== Personnel ==
=== Roster ===
As of December 21, 2024

2024 Florida Gators Roster
Quarterbacks: 2 DJ Lagway – Freshman; 12 Paul Kessler – Freshman; 15 Graham Mertz – (redshirt) Senior; 16 Aidan Warner – (redshirt) Freshman; 18 Clay Millen – (redshirt) Junior; 26 Lawrence Wright IV – Freshman; 28 Aaron Williams – Freshman; Running backs: 1 Montrell Johnson Jr. – Senior; 5 Treyaun Webb – Sophomore; 13 Jadan Baugh – Freshman; 21 KD Daniels – Freshman; 24 Ja'Kobi Jackson – (redshirt) Junior; 25 Anthony Rubio – (redshirt) Freshman; 27 Cam Carroll – (redshirt) Senior; 34 Kelvin Jimenez – Freshman; Wide receivers: 0 Ja'Quavion Fraziars – Senior; 3 Eugene Wilson III – Sophomore; 4 TJ Abrams – Freshman; 6 Elijhah Badger – Senior; 10 Tank Hawkins – Freshman; 11 Aidan Mizell – (redshirt) Freshman; 14 Andy Jean – (redshirt) Freshman; 17 Chimere Dike – Senior; 19 Alex Gonzalez – (redshirt) Sophomore; 22 Kahleil Jackson – (redshirt) Junior; 30 Taylor Spierto – (redshirt) Junior; 33 David Schmidt – Freshman; 35 DeBraun Hampton – Freshman; 43 Jaden Edgecombe – (redshirt) Freshman; 80 Zak Sedaros – (redshirt) Sophomore; 83 Jackson Wade – (redshirt) Freshman; 84 Brian Green Jr. – (redshirt) Freshman; 88 Marcus Burke – (redshirt) Junior; Tight ends: 7 Amir Jackson – Freshman; 8 Arlis Boardingham – (redshirt) Sophomore; 9 Keon Zipperer – (redshirt) Senior; 81 Dawson Johnson – Freshman; 82 Caleb Rillos – Senior; 85 Scott Isacks – (redshirt) Sophomore; 86 Tony Livingston – Sophomore; 87 Gavin Hill – (redshirt) Freshman; 89 Hayden Hansen – (redshirt) Sophomore; Offensive line: 50 Jason Zandamela – Freshman; 53 Bryce Lovett – (redshirt) Freshman; 55 Mike Williams – Freshman; 56 Christian Williams – (redshirt) Sophomore; 57 Devon Manuel – (redshirt) Junior; 58 Austin Barber – (redshirt) Junior; 59 Hayden Clem – (redshirt) Junior; 60 Chase Stevens – Freshman; 63 Caden Jones – (redshirt) Freshman; 65 Brandon Crenshaw-Dickson – (redshirt) Senior; 66 Jake Slaughter – (redshirt) Junior; 68 Fletcher Westphal – Freshman; 70 Damieon George Jr. – (redshirt) Junior; 71 Roderick Kearney – (redshirt) Freshman; 72 Bryan Rosenberg – (redshirt) Freshman; 73 Mark Pitts – (redshirt) Junior; 74 Noel Portnjagin – Freshman; 75 Kamryn Waites – (redshirt) Junior; 76 Mark Faircloth – Freshman; 77 Knijeah Harris – Sophomore; 78 Marcus Mascoll – Freshman; 79 Enoch Wangoy – Freshman; 90 Connor Homa – (redshirt) Freshman	Defensive backs: 0 Sharif Denson – Sophomore; 2 Ja'Keem Jackson – Sophomore; 3 Jason Marshall Jr. – Senior; 4 Teddy Foster – Freshman; 7 Trikweze Bridges – (redshirt) Senior; 12 DJ Douglas – (redshirt) Senior; 13 Aaron Gates – (redshirt) Freshman; 14 Jordan Castell – Sophomore; 18 Bryce Thornton – Sophomore; 20 Asa Turner – (redshirt) Senior; 23 Josiah Davis – Freshman; 25 Cormani McClain – Sophomore; 26 Jameer Grimsley – Freshman; 27 Dijon Johnson – Sophomore; 28 Devin Moore – Junior; 30 Gregory Smith III – Freshman; 32 Cahron Rackley – (redshirt) Junior; 37 Javion Toombs – (redshirt) Sophomore; 39 Brayden Slade – (redshirt) Freshman; 43 Alfonzo Allen Jr. – Junior; 46 Ethan Wilson – (redshirt) Senior; Inside linebackers: 5 Myles Graham – Freshman; 6 Shemar James – Junior; 8 Aaron Chiles – Freshman; 10 Grayson Howard – Sophomore; 15 Derek Wingo – Senior; 16 R.J. Moten – Senior; 22 Deuce Spurlock II – (redshirt) Sophomore; 29 Jaden Robinson – Sophomore; 42 Matthew Kade – Freshman; 47 Justin Pelic – (redshirt) Senior; 50 Jake Xeller – Freshman; Edge rushers: 1 Justus Boone – (redshirt) Junior; 9 Ja'Markis Weston – (redshirt) Senior; 11 Kelby Collins – Sophomore; 17 LJ McCray – Freshman; 19 T.J. Searcy – Sophomore; 24 Kamran James – Sophomore; 34 George Gumbs Jr. – (redshirt) Junior; 36 Bryce Capers – (redshirt) Sophomore; 44 Jack Pyburn – Junior; 45 Layne Swafford – (redshirt) Freshman; 48 Quincy Ivory – (redshirt) Junior; 55 Charles Emanuel III – Freshman; 59 Titus Bullard – Freshman; 91 Tyreik Norwood – (redshirt) Senior; 94 Tyreak Sapp – (redshirt) Junior; Defensive line: 21 Desmond Watson – Senior; 33 Brien Taylor Jr. – Junior; 35 D'Antre Robinson – Freshman; 61 Nicolas Flynn – (redshirt) Sophomore; 88 Caleb Banks – (redshirt) Junior; 92 Sebastian Scott – (redshirt) Freshman; 93 Michai Boireau – Freshman; 95 Jamari Lyons – (redshirt) Sophomore; 96 Tarvorise Brown – (redshirt) Freshman; 97 Joey Slackman – Graduate; 99 Cam Jackson – Senior	Kickers: 29 Trey Smack – Junior; 31 Ricky Abood II – (redshirt) Junior; 40 Brandon Rabasco – Freshman; 41 Hunter Smith – (redshirt) Junior; Punters: 26 Jeremy Crawshaw – Senior; 38 Nicholas Inglis – Freshman; Long snappers: 42 Rocco Underwood – (redshirt) Junior; 48 Gannon Burt – (redshirt) Freshman
Redshirt | Injury

=== Coaching staff ===
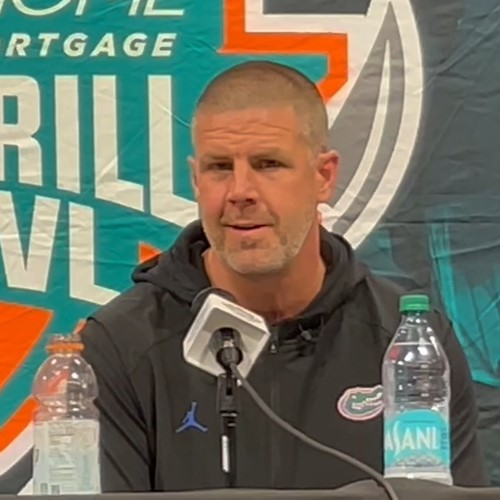
Billy Napier credited his assistant coaches and players for collaborating after a difficult first month to put the Gators 2024 season back on course and into a bowl-winning season.

Florida head coach Billy Napier entered his third year as the Gator's head coach for the 2024 season. During his previous two years with Florida, Napier led the Gators to an overall record of 11 wins and 14 losses (.440) and an SEC record of 6 wins and 10 losses (0.375), with one bowl appearance.

Name	Position	Consecutive season at Florida in current position
Billy Napier	Head Coach	3rd
Rob Sale	Co-offensive Coordinator / Offensive Line	3rd
Austin Armstrong	Defensive Coordinator	2nd
Russ Callaway	Co-offensive Coordinator / Tight Ends	2nd
Ron Roberts	Executive Head Coach, Co-defensive Coordinator / Inside Linebackers	1st
Jabbar Juluke	Associate Head Coach – Offense / Running Backs	3rd
Gerald Chatman	Assistant Coach / Defensive Line	1st
Billy Gonzales	Assistant Coach / Wide Receivers	2nd
Will Harris	Assistant Coach / Secondary	1st
Mike Peterson	Assistant Coach / Edge / Alumni Liaison	3rd
Jonathan Decoster	Assistant Offensive Line Coach	1st
Tyler Miles	Director of Football Strength & Conditioning	1st

Source: 2024 Florida Coaching Staff

== Players drafted into the NFL ==
Round	Pick	Player	Position	NFL Club
4	103	Chimere Dike	WR	Tennessee Titans
5	140	Cam Jackson	DT	Carolina Panthers
5	150	Jason Marshall Jr.	CB	Miami Dolphins
5	152	Shemar James	LB	Dallas Cowboys
6	197	Graham Mertz	QB	Houston Texans
6	216	Jeremy Crawshaw	P	Denver Broncos
7	256	Trikweze Bridges	CB	Los Angeles Chargers
