= George Gumbs Jr. =

American football player (born 2002)

No. 52 – Indianapolis Colts
- Position: Defensive end
- Roster status: Active

Personal information
- Born: October 25, 2002 (age 24); Chicago, Illinois, U.S.
- Listed height: 6 ft 4 in (1.93 m)
- Listed weight: 245 lb (111 kg)

Career information
- High school: Simeon Career Academy (Chicago)
- College: Northern Illinois (2021–2023); Florida (2024–2025)
- NFL draft: 2026: 5th round, 156th overall pick

Career history
- Indianapolis Colts (2026–present)
- Stats at Pro Football Reference

George Gumbs Jr. (born October 25, 2002) is an American professional football defensive end for the Indianapolis Colts of the National Football League (NFL). He played college football for the Northern Illinois Huskies and the Florida Gators and was selected by the Colts in the fifth round of the 2026 NFL draft.

== Early life ==
Gumbs attended Simeon Career Academy in Chicago, Illinois, where he played wide receiver. He was rated as a 3-star prospect coming out of high school and was not highly recruited. Gumbs held offers from Western Michigan and Bowling Green before the COVID-19 pandemic significantly impacted recruiting. He decided to walk on at Northern Illinois.

College recruiting (2021)
Name	Hometown	School	Height	Weight	Commit date
George Gumbs Jr. WR	Chicago, Illinois	Simeon	6 ft 4 in (1.93 m)	250 lb (110 kg)	Dec 2, 2020
George Gumbs Jr. WR	Recruit ratings: Rivals: 247Sports: ESPN: (73)				

== College career ==
=== Northern Illinois ===
During his first year at Northern Illinois, Gumbs played in only four games to maintain redshirt eligibility. In his second year, he played in eight games after transitioning to the tight end position and earned a scholarship. During spring practices going into his redshirt sophomore season, Gumbs transitioned to playing defensive end.

After changing position, Gumbs had a breakout season in 2023. He registered 6.5 tackles-for-loss and 3.5 sacks. He entered the transfer portal following the season and briefly committed to Cincinnati before committing to Florida on January 4th, 2024.

=== Florida Gators ===
==== 2024 season ====
After arriving at Florida, Gumbs added 20 pounds of muscle. During the 2024 season, he recorded five sacks and eight tackles-for-loss while playing all 13 games. Gumbs heavily contributed to an in-season turnaround that the Gators experienced on defense, leading the team's edge rushers in snaps played. In the 2024 Gasparilla Bowl against Tulane, Gumbs registered three solo tackles.

When the Gators beat Florida State 31–11, Gumbs planted a flag with the Gator logo on the away field at Doak Campbell Stadium. This triggered a scuffle between the two teams, which Florida head coach Billy Napier later apologized for. The incident was similar to flag plantings earlier in the day in The Game and North Carolina vs. NC State. Gumbs was less apologetic, saying that he "was just seeing all the things they did to our field the previous year before I was there" and that he "would do it again".

==== 2025 season ====
As a redshirt senior, Gumbs started the first three games of the season for the Gators before sustaining an undisclosed injury. The injury only kept Gumbs out for one game against Miami before he returned to play Texas, where he recorded a sack during the upset win. Gumbs forced a fumble against Ole Miss. This would be Gumbs's final game for the Gators, as he had knee surgery afterwards and missed the rest of the season. He was selected to the 2026 East–West Shrine Bowl.

== Professional career ==
Pre-draft measurables
Height	Weight	Arm length	Hand span	Wingspan	40-yard dash	10-yard split	20-yard split	Three-cone drill	Vertical jump	Broad jump	Bench press
6 ft 4 3/8 in (1.94 m)	245 lb (111 kg)	33 5/8 in (0.85 m)	9 in (0.23 m)	6 ft 9 3/8 in (2.07 m)	4.66 s	1.67 s	2.77 s	7.00 s	41.0 in (1.04 m)	10 ft 1 in (3.07 m)	22 reps
All values from NFL Combine/Pro Day

Gumbs was selected by the Indianapolis Colts in the fifth round with the 156th overall pick of the 2026 NFL draft. He signed his rookie contract on May 8.
