= Clay Millen =

American football player (born 2002)

Profile
- Position: Quarterback

Personal information
- Born: 2002 (age 23–24); Snoqualmie, Washington

Career information
- High school: Mount Si (Snoqualmie, Washington)
- College: Nevada (2021); Colorado State (2022–2023); Florida (2024–2025)

Awards and highlights
- College Football News Freshman All-American (2022)
- Stats at ESPN

Clay Millen (born 2002) was an American college football quarterback who played for the Colorado State Rams, Nevada Wolf Pack, and the University of Florida. Recognized as a Freshman All-American in 2022 by College Football News, Millen set the Colorado State single-season record for completion percentage (72.2%).

== Early life ==
Millen attended Mount Si High School in Snoqualmie, Washington, where he played quarterback as a backup to his brother Cale Millen before starting in his junior year. As a junior, he threw for over 3,000 yards with 34 touchdowns and one interception, earning first-team All-State honors and the Washington 4A Offensive Player of the Year award. His senior year was limited to two games due to the COVID-19 pandemic, but he completed 30 of 37 passes for 435 yards and six touchdowns. Millen was a team captain in his junior and senior years and graduated with a 3.9 GPA.

Rated a four-star recruit by 247Sports and a three-star by Rivals, Millen first committed to Arizona, but then decommitted before committing to Nevada.

== College career ==
=== Nevada ===
Millen appeared in two games in 2021 season at Nevada, completing one of two pass attempts for two yards against New Mexico State.

=== Colorado State ===
In 2022, Millen transferred to Colorado State University, following head coach Jay Norvell from Nevada. As a redshirt freshman, he started every game he was healthy for, earning Freshman All-American honors from College Football News. He set the Colorado State record for single-season completion percentage at 72.2%, throwing for 1,910 yards, 10 touchdowns, and 6 interceptions in 10 games.

In 2023, Millen started the season opener against Washington State, completing 15 of 24 passes for 110 yards with one interception before being replaced during the game. Brayden Fowler-Nicolosi took over as the starting quarterback, and Millen did not appear in any further games that season. Following the season, he entered the transfer portal.

=== Florida ===
On January 14, 2024, Millen announced his commitment to transfer to the University of Florida for the 2024 season. Ahead of the 2024 season, he competed for the backup quarterback role behind returning starter Graham Mertz and freshman DJ Lagway, a five-star recruit.

Millen exhausted his eligibility before concluding his football career in 2025.

=== Statistics ===
Season	Team	Games			Passing								Rushing			
Season	Team	GP	GS	Record	Cmp	Att	Pct	Yds	Y/A	TD	Int	Rtg	Att	Yds	Avg	TD
2021	Nevada	2	0	—	1	2	50.0	2	1.0	0	0	58.4	1	4	4.0	0
2022	Colorado State	10	10	2–8	169	234	72.2	1,910	8.2	10	6	149.8	100	-28	-0.3	0
2023	Colorado State	1	1	0–1	15	24	62.5	110	4.6	0	1	92.7	2	-8	-4.0	0
2024	Florida	0	0	—	DNP											
2025	Florida	0	0	—	DNP											
Career		13	11	2–9	185	260	71.2	2,022	7.8	10	7	143.8	103	-32	-0.3	0

== Personal life ==
Millen is the son of Hugh Millen, a former NFL quarterback, and Michele Millen. His brother, Cale Millen, plays football at the University of Connecticut. Millen graduated from Mount Si High School with a 3.9 GPA.

Millen earned a bachelor's degree in Economics and a Master of International Business from the University of Florida.
