= Aidan Warner =

American football player

No. 16 – Florida Gators
- Position: Quarterback
- Class: Redshirt Junior

Personal information
- Listed height: 6 ft 3 in (1.91 m)
- Listed weight: 202 lb (92 kg)

Career information
- High school: Winter Park (Winter Park, Florida)
- College: Yale (2023); Florida (2024–present)
- Stats at ESPN

Aidan Warner is an American college football quarterback for the Florida Gators. He previously played for the Yale Bulldogs.

== Early life ==
Warner attended Winter Park High School in Winter Park, Florida. He was rated as a three-star recruit and committed to play college football for the Yale Bulldogs.

== College career ==
=== Yale ===
Warner was redshirted in his lone season with the Bulldogs in 2023. After the season, he entered his name into the NCAA transfer portal.

=== Florida ===
Warner transferred to play for the Florida Gators as a walk-on. After starting quarterback DJ Lagway went down with an injury, Warner entered the game where he completed seven of 22 pass attempts for 66 yards and an interception. After the Georgia game, Warner became the Gators starting quarterback after Lagway was ruled out. Warner started his first collegiate football game against Texas, completing 12 of 25 passes for 132 yards and 2 interceptions. Lagway returned to starting duties the following week after recovering from injury.

=== Statistics ===
Season	Team	Games			Passing								Rushing			
Season	Team	GP	GS	Record	Comp	Att	Pct	Yards	Avg	TD	Int	Rate	Att	Yards	Avg	TD
2023	Yale	Redshirt (redshirt)														
2024	Florida	6	1	0–1	21	50	42.0	228	4.6	0	3	68.3	8	−8	−1.0	1
2025	Florida	Did not play														
Career		6	1	0–1	21	50	42.0	228	4.6	0	3	68.3	8	-8	-1.0	1
