= Rob Sale =

American football player and coach (born 1979)

James Madison Dukes
- Title: Offensive line coach

Personal information
- Born: July 1, 1979 (age 47); Monroe, Louisiana, U.S.

Career information
- High school: Neville (LA)
- College: LSU (1998–2002)

Career history
- Catholic HS of Pointe Coupee (2006) Offensive line coach; Alabama (2007–2011) Strength & conditioning assistant & offensive analyst; McNeese State (2012–2013) Offensive line coach; McNeese State (2014) Co-offensive coordinator & offensive line coach; Georgia (2015) Offensive line coach; Louisiana–Monroe (2016) Offensive line coach; Arizona State (2017) Offensive line coach & running game coordinator; Louisiana (2018–2020) Offensive coordinator & offensive line coach; New York Giants (2021) Offensive line coach; Florida (2022–2024) Offensive coordinator & offensive line coach; Florida (2025) Offensive line coach; James Madison (2026–present) Offensive line coach

Robert Alan Sale (born July 1, 1979) is an American football coach who is the offensive line coach for the James Madison Dukes. He previously served as an assistant coach at the University of Louisiana at Lafayette, Arizona State University, University of Louisiana at Monroe, University of Georgia, McNeese State University, University of Alabama, and the New York Giants.

== Playing career ==
Sale was an offensive lineman at LSU from 1998 to 2002, where he was a three-year starter at both guard positions and center.

== Coaching career ==
=== Catholic HS of Pointe Coupee ===
Sale began his coaching career in 2006 at Catholic High School of Pointe Coupee in Louisiana as their offensive line coach.

=== Alabama ===
Sale was hired as a strength & conditioning assistant and offensive analyst at Alabama in 2007 under his former college coach Nick Saban.

=== McNeese State ===
Sale served as the offensive line coach at McNeese State from 2012 to 2014 and later added the title of co-offensive coordinator in 2014.

=== Georgia ===
Sale was named the offensive line coach at Georgia in 2015. Sale was fired after the season following the termination of Mark Richt. In 2016, Sale joined as the offensive line coach at Louisiana–Monroe.

=== Arizona State ===
Sale joined the coaching staff at Arizona State in 2017 as their offensive line coach and running game coordinator, working under Sun Devils offensive coordinator Billy Napier, whom he met when they were offensive analysts at Alabama.

=== Louisiana ===
When Napier was named the head coach at Louisiana in 2017, Sale followed him to Lafayette to be the Ragin' Cajuns offensive coordinator and offensive line coach.

=== New York Giants ===
On March 10, 2021, Sale was hired by the New York Giants as their offensive line coach under head coach Joe Judge. However, the Giants had an abysmal season, going 4-13 with the worst blocking unit in the NFL.

=== Florida ===
On January 11, 2022, Sale was hired by Florida as their offensive coordinator and offensive line coach under head coach Billy Napier.

== Personal life ==
Born in Monroe, Louisiana, Sale's family has owned a store since 1946, and has sold LSU items since 2000. Sale and his wife Amanda have two sons, Tripp and Briggs.
