= Jamarion Wilcox =

American football player

Profile
- Position: Running back

Personal information
- Born: Cincinnati, Ohio, U.S.
- Listed height: 5 ft 10 in (1.78 m)
- Listed weight: 197 lb (89 kg)

Career information
- High school: South Paulding (Douglasville, Georgia)
- College: Kentucky (2023–2025)
- Stats at ESPN

Jamarion Wilcox is an American former football running back. He played college football for the Kentucky Wildcats.

== Early life ==
Wilcox attended South Paulding High School in Douglasville, Georgia. As a senior, he rushed for 2,059 yards and 29 touchdowns. He finished his high school career rushing for 4,119 yards and 58 total touchdowns. A four-star recruit, Wilcox committed to play college football at the University of Kentucky over offers from Auburn, Clemson, and Ohio State.

== College career ==
Wilcox redshirted in 2023, before competing for the starting running back job the following year. Against Ohio, he rushed for 82 yards on eight carries. Against Tennessee, Wilcox rushed for then career-high 102 yards. Prior to the start of the 2025 season, he was accused of committing sexual assault. Wilcox was suspended by the team and was later arrested and charged with first-degree sexual abuse. After missing the entire season, he entered the transfer portal.

On January 15, 2026, Wilcox announced his decision to transfer to Marshall University to play for the Marshall Thundering Herd. On July 31, he pleaded guilty to sexual misconduct, with sentencing scheduled for September 18. Following his guilty plea, Wilcox was removed from Marshall's roster.

=== Statistics ===
College statistics
Season	Team	Games	Rushing				Receiving			
Season	Team	GP	Att	Yards	Avg	TD	Rec	Yards	Avg	TD
2023	Kentucky	Redshirt (redshirt)								
2024	Kentucky	12	92	590	6.4	2	7	24	3.4	0
2025	Kentucky	DNP								
Career		12	92	590	6.4	2	7	24	3.4	0
