= Asa Turner (American football) =

American football player

No. 20
- Position: Safety

Personal information
- Listed height: 6 ft 3 in (1.91 m)
- Listed weight: 212 lb (96 kg)

Career information
- High school: Carlsbad (Carlsbad, California)
- College: Washington (2019–2023); Florida (2024)
- Stats at ESPN

Jacob "Asa" Turner is an American former football safety. He played college football for the Washington Huskies and the Florida Gators.

== Early life ==
Turner attended Carlsbad High School in Carlsbad, California, where he played football as a wide receiver and safety. He was rated as a four-star recruit and committed to play college football for the Washington Huskies over offers from schools such as Michigan, Notre Dame, and USC.

== College career ==
=== Washington ===
In week 3 of the 2019 season, Turner recorded his first career interception in a 45-19 win over BYU. He finished his freshman season in 2019 with 19 tackles with two being for a loss, and an interception. In the COVID shortened 2020 season, Turner amassed 17 tackles, a pass deflection, and an interception in four games. He finished the 2021 season making 34 tackles with two going for a loss and two interceptions. In the 2022 season opener, Turner recorded two interceptions against Kent State. He finished the 2022 season with 52 tackles with one being for a loss, a pass deflection, and two interceptions, earning honorable mention all-Pac-12 Conference honors.

In week 2 of the 2023 season versus Tulsa, Turner broke his hand on the first play while making a tackle, causing him to miss the next three games. In week 7, he notched seven tackles in a win over rival Oregon. In week 8, Turner made five tackles in a 15-7 win over Arizona State, but he suffered another injury causing him to miss the next five games. In the 2023 season he tallied 26 tackles with two going for a loss, and a fumble recovery. After the season, Turner entered the NCAA transfer portal as a graduate student.

=== Florida ===
On January 25, 2024, Turner announced that he would be transferring to Florida.

On July 29, 2025, Florida head coach Billy Napier announced that Turner was transitioning out of football, citing multiple injuries as the main factor for his retirement.
