= Trikweze Bridges =

American football player (born 2000)

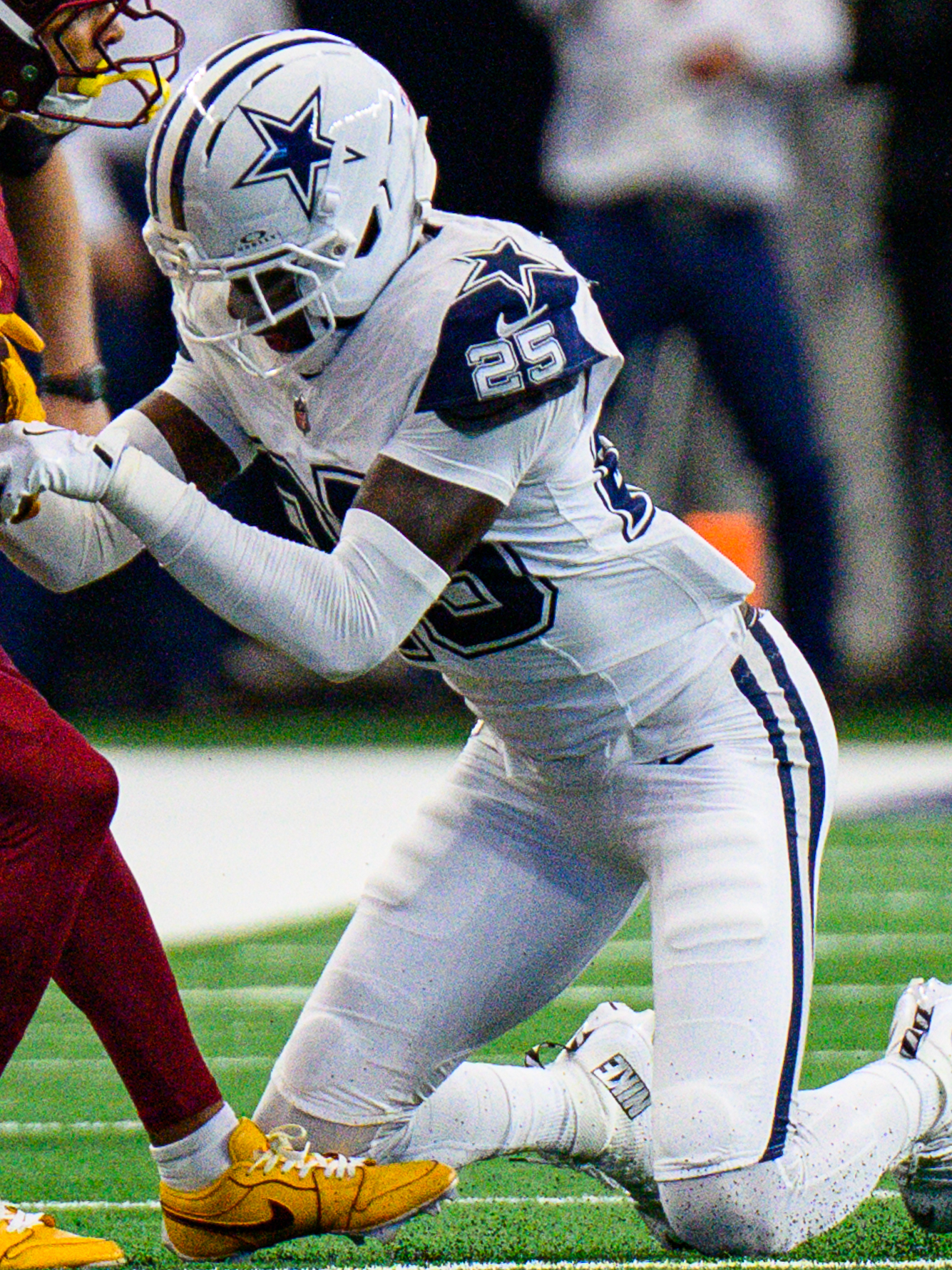
- Bridges with the Dallas Cowboys in 2025

No. 24 – Cincinnati Bengals
- Position: Cornerback
- Roster status: Practice squad

Personal information
- Born: September 20, 2000 (age 26); Lanett, Alabama, U.S.
- Listed height: 6 ft 2 in (1.88 m)
- Listed weight: 200 lb (91 kg)

Career information
- High school: Lanett (AL)
- College: Oregon (2019–2023); Florida (2024)
- NFL draft: 2025: 7th round, 256th overall pick

Career history
- Los Angeles Chargers (2025)*; Dallas Cowboys (2025); Cincinnati Bengals (2026–present)*
- * Offseason or practice squad member only

Career NFL statistics as of 2025
- Total tackles: 23
- Pass deflections: 3
- Interceptions: 1
- Stats at Pro Football Reference

Trikweze Bridges (born September 20, 2000) is an American professional football cornerback on the Cincinnati Bengals of the National Football League (NFL). He played college football for the Oregon Ducks and Florida Gators. He was selected by the Chargers in the seventh round of the 2025 NFL draft.

== Early life ==
Bridges attended Lanett High School, where he led both the football and basketball teams to state championships.

As a junior, he notched 98 tackles with 12 being for a loss, nine interceptions, five forced fumbles, and six fumble recoveries, while also hauling in 30 receptions for 732 yards and eight touchdowns offensively. Bridges put up six tackles in their state title game win over Leroy High School. He tied the Alabama state record with 36 career interceptions.

Coming out of high school, he was rated as a four-star recruit and committed to play college football for the Oregon Ducks over offers from schools such as Alabama, Florida State, LSU, Ohio State, Oklahoma, and Penn State.

== College career ==
=== Oregon ===
In his first two seasons in 2019 and 2020, Bridges combined to play in eight games, where he made just two tackles on special teams.

Heading into the 2021 season, Bridges competed for a starting spot in the Ducks secondary. He appeared in 14 games with three starts, where he notched 26 tackles and an interception.

In 2022, Bridges started in all 13 games, where he totaled 49 tackles, five pass deflections, three interceptions, and a forced fumble.

In 2023, he tallied 16 tackles and three pass deflections. After the season, he entered his name into the NCAA transfer portal.

=== Florida ===
Bridges transferred to play for the Florida Gators. In week 12 of the 2024 season, he notched 11 tackles, a forced fumble, and an interception in a win over Kentucky. He recorded 70 tackles, six pass deflections, two interceptions, and two forced fumbles. After the conclusion of the 2024 season, he declared for the 2025 NFL draft.

== Professional career ==
Pre-draft measurables
Height	Weight	Arm length	Hand span	Wingspan	40-yard dash	10-yard split	20-yard split	20-yard shuttle	Three-cone drill	Vertical jump	Broad jump
6 ft 2 1/8 in (1.88 m)	196 lb (89 kg)	33 1/4 in (0.84 m)	9 in (0.23 m)	6 ft 9 1/8 in (2.06 m)	4.45 s	1.51 s	2.50 s	4.39 s	7.02 s	34.5 in (0.88 m)	10 ft 7 in (3.23 m)
All values from Pro Day

=== Los Angeles Chargers ===
Bridges was selected by the Los Angeles Chargers with the 256th overall pick in the seventh round in the 2025 NFL draft. On August 26, 2025, he was waived as part of final roster cuts.

=== Dallas Cowboys ===
On August 27, 2025, Bridges was claimed off waivers by the Dallas Cowboys. He played on special teams in the season opener against the Philadelphia Eagles. In Week 3 against the Chicago Bears, Bridges was a backup at cornerback and had four tackles. In Week 8 against the Denver Broncos, he started in place of an injured Trevon Diggs, making four tackles, one interception, and two pass breakups. In the team's season finale against the New York Giants, he started and had five tackles. Bridges appeared in 16 games (including two starts), tallying 21 tackles, three pass breakups, one interception, and two special teams tackles.

On August 30, 2026, Bridges was waived by the Cowboys as a part of final roster cuts.

=== Cincinnati Bengals ===
On September 1, 2026, Bridges signed with the Cincinnati Bengals practice squad.
