= Chimere Dike =

American football player (born 2001)

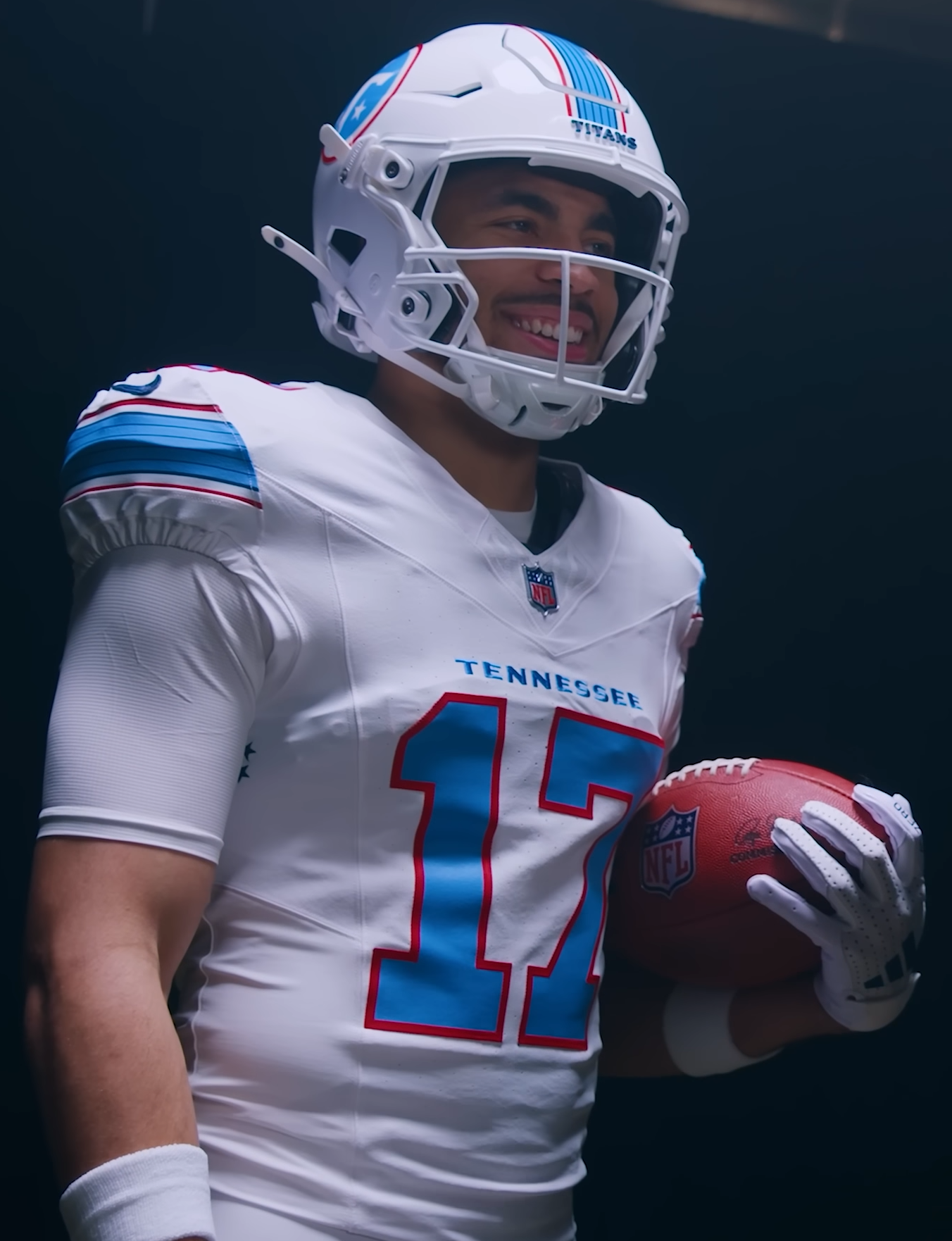
- Dike with the Tennessee Titans in 2026

No. 17 – Tennessee Titans
- Position: Wide receiver
- Roster status: Active

Personal information
- Born: December 14, 2001 (age 24); Waukesha, Wisconsin, U.S.
- Listed height: 6 ft 1 in (1.85 m)
- Listed weight: 196 lb (89 kg)

Career information
- High school: Waukesha North (WI)
- College: Wisconsin (2020–2023); Florida (2024)
- NFL draft: 2025: 4th round, 103rd overall pick

Career history
- Tennessee Titans (2025–present)

Awards and highlights
- First-team All-Pro (2025) (Note: Selected as a punt returner); Pro Bowl (2025); PFWA All-Rookie Team (2025)

Career NFL statistics as of Week 3, 2026
- Receptions: 50
- Receiving yards: 433
- Receiving touchdowns: 4
- Return yards: 2,245
- Rushing yards: 18
- Return touchdowns: 2
- Stats at Pro Football Reference

Chimere Dike (/tʃɪmreɪ dikeɪ/ CHIM-ray DEE-kay; born December 14, 2001) is an American professional football wide receiver and return specialist for the Tennessee Titans of the National Football League (NFL). He played college football for the Florida Gators and Wisconsin Badgers. Dike was selected by the Titans in the fourth round of the 2025 NFL draft

== Early life ==
Dike was born in Waukesha, Wisconsin, U.S. and is of Nigerian descent through his father. He attended Waukesha North High School. As a junior, he hauled in 79 receptions for 1,091 yards en route to being named first-team all-state. Coming out of high school, Dike was rated as a three-star recruit and the 6th best player in the state of Wisconsin, and committed to play college football for the Wisconsin Badgers over Iowa State.

== College career ==
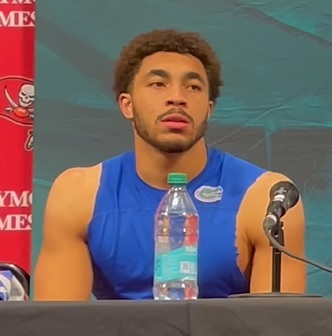
Dike after the 2024 Gasparilla Bowl

=== Wisconsin ===
In Dike's first two seasons in 2020 and 2021, he played in 20 games with seven starts, totaling 31 receptions for 461 yards and two touchdowns. In 2022, he started all 13 games, hauling in 47 receptions for 689 yards and six touchdowns, while also adding a touchdown on the ground. In 2023, Dike tallied 19 receptions for 328 yards and a touchdown. After the season, Dike entered his name into the NCAA transfer portal.

=== Florida ===
Dike transferred to play for the Florida Gators joining his former quarterback Graham Mertz. He finished the 2024 season with 42 receptions for 783 yards and two touchdowns.

== Professional career ==
Pre-draft measurables
Height	Weight	Arm length	Hand span	Wingspan	40-yard dash	10-yard split	20-yard split	20-yard shuttle	Three-cone drill	Vertical jump	Broad jump
6 ft 0 5/8 in (1.84 m)	196 lb (89 kg)	32 1/8 in (0.82 m)	9 1/8 in (0.23 m)	6 ft 4 7/8 in (1.95 m)	4.34 s	1.51 s	2.53 s	4.27 s	6.82 s	38.5 in (0.98 m)	10 ft 8 in (3.25 m)
All values from NFL Combine

Dike was selected by the Tennessee Titans as the 103rd overall pick in the fourth round of the 2025 NFL draft. He was named the Titans' starting punt returner and kick returner at the start of the 2025 season. He made his professional debut in the Week 1 opener against the Denver Broncos, where he made 4 kick returns for 144 yards and a punt return for 12 yards. In Week 5, Dike had 169 total return yards, highlighted by a 65-yard kick return that kickstarted a 22–21 comeback win over the Arizona Cardinals, earning AFC Special Teams Player of the Week. In Week 12 against the Seattle Seahawks, Dike returned a Michael Dickson punt 90 yards for a touchdown; however, the Titans would lose the game, 30–24. In Week 17 against the New Orleans Saints, Dike broke the NFL rookie record for all-purpose yards, surpassing a mark that had stood since 1988 when Tim Brown set the standard with 2,317 yards.

== NFL career statistics ==
Legend
	Led the league
**Bold**	Career high

=== Regular season ===
Offense

Year	Team	Games		Receiving					Rushing					Fumbles	
Year	Team	GP	GS	Rec	Yds	Avg	Lng	TD	Att	Yds	Avg	Lng	TD	Fum	Lost
2025	TEN	17	**10**	**48**	**423**	8.8	**38**	**4**	**11**	**18**	**1.6**	**9**	0	2	1
2026	TEN	8	2	11	124	**11.3**	28	1	0	0	0.0	0	0	**3**	0
Career		25	12	59	547	9.3	38	5	11	18	1.6	9	0	5	1

Special teams

Year	Team	Games		Punt returns					Kick returns					Yards	
Year	Team	GP	GS	Ret	Yds	Avg	Lng	TD	Ret	Yds	Avg	Lng	TD	K&P	AP
2025	TEN	17	**10**	**23**	**398**	**17.3**	**90**	**2**	**62**	**1,588**	25.6	**71**	0	**1,986**	**2,427**
2026	TEN	8	2	11	137	12.5	58	0	32	829	**25.9**	40	0	966	1,090
Career		25	12	34	535	15.7	90	2	94	2,417	25.7	71	0	2,952	3,517

== Personal life ==
Dike is currently engaged to Seattle Torrent forward Lexie Adzija.
