= 2024 Kentucky Wildcats football team =

American college football season

2024 Kentucky Wildcats football
- Conference: Southeastern Conference
- Record: 4–8 (1–7 SEC)
- Head coach: Mark Stoops (12th season)
- Offensive coordinator: Bush Hamdan (1st season)
- Offensive scheme: Multiple
- Defensive coordinator: Brad White (6th season)
- Base defense: 3–4 or 4–3
- Home stadium: Kroger Field

2024 Southeastern Conference football standings
	Conf.			Overall
Team	W		L	W		L
No. 4 Texas y^	7	–	1	13	–	3
No. 6 Georgia y$^	6	–	2	11	–	3
No. 9 Tennessee ^	6	–	2	10	–	3
No. 22 Missouri	5	–	3	10	–	3
No. 11 Ole Miss	5	–	3	10	–	3
No. 17 Alabama	5	–	3	9	–	4
No. 19 South Carolina	5	–	3	9	–	4
LSU	5	–	3	9	–	4
Texas A&M	5	–	3	8	–	5
Florida	4	–	4	8	–	5
Arkansas	3	–	5	7	–	6
Vanderbilt	3	–	5	7	–	6
Oklahoma	2	–	6	6	–	7
Auburn	2	–	6	5	–	7
Kentucky	1	–	7	4	–	8
Mississippi State	0	–	8	2	–	10
Championship: Georgia 22, Texas 19 ^{OT}
^ – College Football Playoff participant; $ – Conference champion; y – Championship game participant; Rankings from AP Poll

The 2024 Kentucky Wildcats football team represented the University of Kentucky in the Southeastern Conference (SEC) during the 2024 NCAA Division I FBS football season. The Wildcats are led by Mark Stoops in his 12th year as their head coach. The Kentucky football team plays its home games at Kroger Field in Lexington, Kentucky.

After a loss to Texas on November 23, the Wildcats became bowl ineligible for the first time since 2015, ending a school record eight straight bowl game streak.

== Schedule ==
Kentucky and the SEC announced the 2024 football schedule on December 13, 2023. The 2024 Wildcats' schedule consists of 8 home games and 4 away games for the regular season.

Date	Time	Opponent	Site	TV	Result	Attendance
August 31	7:45 p.m.	Southern Miss*	Kroger Field; Lexington, KY	SECN	W 31–0	61,627
September 7	3:30 p.m.	South Carolina	Kroger Field; Lexington, KY (SEC Nation)	ABC	L 6–31	61,349
September 14	7:30 p.m.	No. 1 Georgia	Kroger Field; Lexington, KY	ABC	L 12–13	61,663
September 21	12:45 p.m.	Ohio*	Kroger Field; Lexington, KY	SECN	W 41–6	61,783
September 28	12:00 p.m.	at No. 6 Ole Miss	Vaught–Hemingway Stadium; Oxford, MS	ABC	W 20–17	67,616
October 12	7:45 p.m.	Vanderbilt^{†}	Kroger Field; Lexington, KY (rivalry)	SECN	L 13–20	62,120
October 19	7:45 p.m.	at Florida	Ben Hill Griffin Stadium; Gainesville, FL (rivalry)	SECN	L 20–48	89,906
October 26	7:45 p.m.	Auburn	Kroger Field; Lexington, KY	SECN	L 10–24	60,605
November 2	7:45 p.m.	at No. 7 Tennessee	Neyland Stadium; Knoxville, TN (rivalry)	SECN	L 18–28	101,915
November 16	1:30 p.m.	Murray State*	Kroger Field; Lexington, KY	SECN+/ESPN+	W 48–6	48,370
November 23	3:30 p.m.	at No. 3 Texas	Darrell K Royal–Texas Memorial Stadium; Austin, TX	ABC	L 14–31	102,811
November 30	12:00 p.m.	Louisville*	Kroger Field; Lexington, KY (Governor's Cup)	SECN	L 14–41	58,612
*Non-conference game; ^{†}Homecoming; Rankings from AP Poll (and CFP Rankings, after November 5) - Released prior to game; All times are in Eastern time; Source:

== Game summaries ==
=== vs Southern Miss ===
Southern Miss Golden Eagles (0-0) vs Kentucky Wildcats (0-0) – Game summary

Quarter	1	2	3	4	Total
Golden Eagles	0	0	0	0	0
Wildcats	7	17	7	0	31

at Kroger Field • Lexington, Kentucky

- Date: August 31
- Game time: 7:45 p.m.
- Game weather: Cloudy • Temperature: 75 °F (24 °C) • Wind: NE at 5 miles per hour (8.0 km/h)
- Game attendance: 61,627
- Referee: Steve Marlowe
- TV announcers (SECN): Tom Hart (play-by-play), Jordan Rodgers (color), and Cole Cubelic (sideline)
- Recap

Game information

First quarter

- (6:03) UK – Barion Brown 12-yard pass from Brock Vandagriff (Alex Raynor kick) (Drive: 10 plays, 59 yards, 5:54; UK 7–0)

Second quarter

- (7:45) UK – Alex Raynor 41-yard field goal (Drive: 4 plays, 9 yards, 2:01; UK 10–0)
- (3:07) UK – Demie Sumo-Karngbaye 1-yard run (Alex Raynor kick) (Drive: 7 plays, 75 yards, 2:59; UK 17–0)
- (0:31) UK – Barion Brown 12-yard pass from Brock Vandagriff (Alex Raynor kick) (Drive: 3 plays, 29 yards, 1:21; UK 24–0)

Third quarter

- (0:00) UK – Jordan Dingle 5-yard pass from Brock Vandagriff (Alex Raynor kick) (Drive: 7 plays, 84 yards, 12:54; UK 31–0)

Fourth quarter

Game suspended at 11:51 pm with 9:56 remaining in 3rd quarter

Statistics	USM	UK
First downs	7	19
Total yards	31–131	42–317
Rushing yards	12–5	24–148
Passing yards	126	169
Passing: Comp–Att–Int	13–19–2	12–18–1
Time of possession	15:04	29:56

Team	Category	Player	Statistics
Southern Miss	Passing	Tate Rodemaker	12-19, 126 yards, 2 INTs
Southern Miss	Rushing	Ethan Crawford	3 carries, 12 yards
Southern Miss	Receiving	Dannis Jackson	3 receptions, 42 yards
Kentucky	Passing	Brock Vandagriff	12-18, 169 yards, 3 TDs, INT
Kentucky	Rushing	Demie Sumo-Karngbaye	8 carries, 59 yards, TD
Kentucky	Receiving	Barion Brown	4 receptions, 28 yards, 2 TDs

=== vs South Carolina ===
South Carolina Gamecocks (1-0) vs Kentucky Wildcats (1-0) – Game summary

Quarter	1	2	3	4	Total
Gamecocks	7	3	14	7	31
Wildcats	0	6	0	0	6

at Kroger Field • Lexington, Kentucky

- Date: September 7
- Game time: 3:30 p.m.
- Game weather: Sunny • Temperature: 70 °F (21 °C) • Wind: N at 12 miles per hour (19 km/h)
- Game attendance: 61,349
- Referee: David Smith
- TV announcers (ABC): Sean McDonough (play-by-play), Greg McElroy (color), and Molly McGrath (sideline)

Game information

First quarter

- (7:39) USC – Mazeo Bennett Jr. 24-yard pass from LaNorris Sellers (Alex Herrera kick) (Drive: 4 plays, 61 yards, 1:21; USC 7–0)

Second quarter

- (8:06) USC – Alex Herrera 29-yard field goal (Drive: 6 plays, 20 yards, 3:09; USC 10–0)
- (1:55) UK – Alex Raynor 32-yard field goal (Drive: 12 plays, 57 yards, 6:11; USC 10–3)
- (0:19) UK – Alex Raynor 39-yard field goal (Drive: 4 plays, 7 yards, 1:20; USC 10–6)

Third quarter

- (6:49) USC – Joshua Simon 16-yard pass from LaNorris Sellers (Alex Herrera kick) (Drive: 7 plays, 58 yards, 3:53; USC 17–6)
- (0:28) USC – Raheim Sanders 6-yard run (Alex Herrera kick) (Drive: 9 plays, 43 yards, 4:05; USC 24–6)

Fourth quarter

- (14:49) USC – Nick Emmanwori 24-yard interception return (Alex Herrera kick) (Drive: 2 plays, 2 yards, 0:39; USC 31–6)

Statistics	SCAR	UK
First downs	13	13
Total yards	50–252	63–183
Rushing yards	34–86	46–139
Passing yards	166	44
Passing: Comp–Att–Int	12–16–1	6–17–2
Time of possession	27:39	32:21

Team	Category	Player	Statistics
South Carolina	Passing	LaNorris Sellers	11/15, 159 yards, 2 TD, INT
South Carolina	Rushing	Raheim Sanders	13 carries, 54 yards, TD
South Carolina	Receiving	Mazeo Bennett Jr.	3 receptions, 63 yards, TD
Kentucky	Passing	Brock Vandagriff	3/10, 30 yards, INT
Kentucky	Rushing	Demie Sumo-Karngbaye	17 carries, 70 yards
Kentucky	Receiving	Dane Key	2 receptions, 36 yards

=== vs No. 1 Georgia ===
No. 1 Georgia Bulldogs (2-0) vs Kentucky Wildcats (1-1) – Game summary

Quarter	1	2	3	4	Total
No. 1 Bulldogs	0	3	3	7	13
Wildcats	3	3	3	3	12

at Kroger Field • Lexington, Kentucky

- Date: September 14
- Game time: 7:30 p.m.
- Game weather: Sunny • Temperature: 78 °F (26 °C) • Wind: E 6 mph
- Game attendance: 61,663
- Referee: Kyle Olson
- TV announcers (ABC): Sean McDonough (play-by-play), Greg McElroy (color), and Molly McGrath (sideline)

Game information

First quarter

- (2:45) Kentucky- Alex Raynor 55-yard field goal (Drive: 5 plays, 15 yards, 2:32; Kentucky 3–0)

Second quarter

- (3:48) Georgia - Peyton Woodring 34-yard field goal (Drive: 4 plays, 7 yards, 0:57; Tied 3–3)
- (0:05) Kentucky - Alex Raynor 32-yard field goal (Drive: 13 plays, 61 yards, 3:43; Kentucky 6–3)

Third quarter

- (9:03) Kentucky - Alex Raynor 40-yard field goal (Drive: 11 plays, 61 yards, 5:57; Kentucky 9–3)
- (3:52) Georgia - Peyton Woodring 30-yard field goal (Drive: 11 plays, 63 yards, 5:11; Kentucky 9–6)

Fourth quarter

- (6:46) Georgia - Branson Robinson 3-yard rush (Peyton Woodring kick) (Drive: 10 plays, 68 yards, 4:57; Georgia 13–9)
- (8:01) Kentucky - Alex Raynor 51-yard field goal (Drive: 11 plays, 43 yards, 4:19; Georgia 13-12)

Statistics	UGA	UK
First downs	12	23
Total yards	54–262	73–284
Rushing yards	30–102	45–170
Passing yards	160	114
Passing: Comp–Att–Int	15–24–0	14–28–0
Time of possession	24:58	35:02

Team	Category	Player	Statistics
Georgia	Passing	Carson Beck	15/24, 160 yards
Georgia	Rushing	Trevor Etienne	19 carries, 79 yards
Georgia	Receiving	Dominic Lovett	6 receptions, 89 yards
Kentucky	Passing	Brock Vandagriff	14/27, 114 yards
Kentucky	Rushing	Demie Sumo-Karngbaye	22 carries, 98 yards
Kentucky	Receiving	Barion Brown	3 receptions, 34 yards

=== vs Ohio ===
Ohio Bobcats (2-1) vs Kentucky Wildcats (1-2) – Game summary

Quarter	1	2	3	4	Total
Bobcats	0	0	0	6	6
Wildcats	3	14	10	14	41

at Kroger Field • Lexington, Kentucky

- Date: September 21
- Game time: 12:45 p.m.
- Game weather: Cloudy • Temperature: 84 °F (29 °C) • Wind: SW 8 mph
- Game attendance: 61,783
- Referee: Daniel Gautreaux
- TV announcers (SECN): Dave Neal (play-by-play), Aaron Murray (analyst), and Ashley ShahAhmadi (sideline)

Game information

First quarter

- (5:48) UK – Alex Raynor 30-yard field goal, Drive: 8 plays, 52 yards, 4:47; UK 3–0

Second quarter

- (14:39) UK – Demie Sumo-Karngbaye 1-yard run (Alex Raynor kick), Drive: 7 plays, 80 yards, 3:28; UK 10–0
- (4:07) UK – Demie Sumo-Karngbaye 2-yard run (Alex Raynor kick), Drive: 7 plays, 80 yards, 3:41; UK 17–0

Third quarter

- (5:18) UK – Alex Raynor 34-yard field goal, Drive: 13 plays, 67 yards, 6:07; UK 20–0
- (5:12) UK – Maxwell Hairston 25-yard Interception Return (Alex Raynor kick), UK 17–0

Fourth quarter

- (14:53) OHIO – Rickey Hunt Jr. 1-yard run (pass failed), Drive: 5 plays, 51 yards, 2:00; UK 27–7
- (11:38) UK – Barion Brown 23-yard run (Alex Raynor kick), Drive: 6 plays, 56 yards, 3:07; UK 34–7
- (03:45) UK – Gavin Wimsatt 2-yard run (Alex Raynor kick), Drive: 12 plays, 59 yards, 6:17; UK 41–7

Statistics	OHIO	UK
First downs	14	25
Total yards	51–223	68–488
Rushing yards	32–113	41–206
Passing yards	110	282
Passing: Comp–Att–Int	8–19–1	19–27–0
Time of possession	26:25	33:35

Team	Category	Player	Statistics
Ohio	Passing	Nick Poulas	8/19, 110 yards, INT
Ohio	Rushing	Duncan Brune	6 carries, 33 yards
Ohio	Receiving	Coleman Owen	4 receptions, 54 yards
Kentucky	Passing	Brock Vandagriff	17/24, 237 yards
Kentucky	Rushing	Jamarion Wilcox	8 carries, 82 yards
Kentucky	Receiving	Dane Key	7 receptions, 145 yards

=== at No. 6 Ole Miss ===
Kentucky Wildcats (2-2) at No. 6 Ole Miss Rebels (4-0) – Game summary

Quarter	1	2	3	4	Total
Wildcats	3	7	3	7	20
No. 6 Rebels	7	0	10	0	17

at Vaught–Hemingway Stadium • University, Mississippi

- Date: September 28
- Game time: 12:00 p.m.
- Game weather: Cloudy • Temperature: 66 °F (19 °C) • Wind: W 7 mph
- Game attendance: 67,616
- Referee: Wayne Winkler
- TV announcers (ABC): Sean McDonough (play-by-play), Greg McElroy (color), and Molly McGrath (sideline)

Game information

First quarter

- (12:51) OLE – Henry Parrish Jr. 1-yard run, Caden Davis kick (Drive: 6 plays, 83 yards, 2:05; Ole Miss 7–0)
- (5:13) KEN – Alex Raynor 27-yard field goal (Drive: 15 plays, 66 yards, 7:38; Ole Miss 7–3)

Second quarter

- (0:27) KEN – Dane Key 5-yard pass from Brock Vandagriff, Alex Raynor kick (Drive: 13 plays, 81 yards, 5:45; Kentucky 10–7)

Third quarter

- (9:44) OLE – Caden Davis 31-yard field goal (Drive: 10 plays, 51 yards, 3:08; Tied 10–10)
- (6:31) KEN – Alex Raynor 48-yard field goal (Drive: 6 plays, 45 yards, 3:13; Kentucky 13–10)
- (0:10) OLE – Tre Harris 48-yard pass from Jaxson Dart, Caden Davis kick (Drive: 6 plays, 61 yards, 2:01; Ole Miss 17–13)

Fourth quarter

- (2:25) KEN – Josh Kattus 2-yard run, Alex Raynor kick (Drive: 6 plays, 83 yards, 2:23; Kentucky 20–17)

Statistics	UK	MISS
First downs	22	14
Total yards	75–336	56–353
Rushing yards	47–93	29–92
Passing yards	243	261
Passing: Comp–Att–Int	18–28–0	18–27–0
Time of possession	39:43	20:17

Team	Category	Player	Statistics
Kentucky	Passing	Brock Vandagriff	18/28, 243 yards, TD
Kentucky	Rushing	Demie Sumo-Karngbaye	11 carries, 47 yards
Kentucky	Receiving	Dane Key	8 receptions, 105 yards, TD
Ole Miss	Passing	Jaxson Dart	18/27, 261 yards, TD
Ole Miss	Rushing	Henry Parrish Jr.	13 carries, 62 yards, TD
Ole Miss	Receiving	Tre Harris	11 receptions, 176 yards, TD

=== vs Vanderbilt (rivalry) ===
Vanderbilt Commodores (3-2) vs Kentucky Wildcats (3-2) – Game summary

Quarter	1	2	3	4	Total
Commodores	7	7	3	3	20
Wildcats	0	7	0	6	13

at Kroger Field • Lexington, Kentucky

- Date: October 12
- Game time: 7:45 p.m.
- Game weather: Clear • Temperature: 70 °F (21 °C)
- Game attendance: 62,120
- Referee: Jason Autrey
- TV announcers (SECN): Tom Hart (play-by-play), Jordan Rodgers (color) and Cole Cubelic (sideline)
- Box Score

Game information
First quarter
- VAN – A. J. Newberry 20-yard pass from Diego Pavia (Brock Taylor kick), 4:50. Vanderbilt 7–0. Drive: 9 plays, 97 yards, 4:52.

Second quarter

- UK – Demie Sumo-Karngbaye 1-yard run (Alex Raynor kick), 13:42. Tied 7–7. Drive: 12 plays, 78 yards, 6:02.
- VAN – Richie Hoskins 18-yard pass from Diego Pavia (Brock Taylor kick), 0:13. Vanderbilt 14–7. Drive: 6 plays, 60 yards, 1:22.

Third quarter

- VAN – Brock Taylor 49-yard field goal, 7:51. Vanderbilt 17–7. Drive: 11 plays, 44 yards, 7:09.

Fourth quarter

- VAN – Brock Taylor 50-yard field goal, 8:47. Vanderbilt 20–7. Drive: 12 plays, 58 yards, 8:03.
- UK – Dane Key 22-yard pass from Brock Vandagriff (run failed), 7:02. Vanderbilt 20–13. Drive: 6 plays, 75 yards, 1:45.

Statistics	VAN	UK
First downs	19	23
Total yards	55–288	57–322
Rushing yards	37–145	31–164
Passing yards	143	158
Passing: Comp–Att–Int	15–18–1	15–26–1
Time of possession	34:35	25:25

Team	Category	Player	Statistics
Vanderbilt	Passing	Diego Pavia	15/18, 143 yards, 2 TD, INT
Vanderbilt	Rushing	Sedrick Alexander	11 rushes, 58 yards
Vanderbilt	Receiving	Richie Hoskins	3 receptions, 44 yards, TD
Kentucky	Passing	Brock Vandagriff	15/25, 158 yards, TD
Kentucky	Rushing	Demie Sumo-Karngbaye	12 rushes, 59 yards, TD
Kentucky	Receiving	Dane Key	8 receptions, 83 yards, TD

=== at Florida (rivalry) ===
Kentucky Wildcats (3–3) at Florida Gators (3–3) – Game summary

Quarter	1	2	3	4	Total
Wildcats	0	13	7	0	20
Gators	3	24	7	14	48

at Ben Hill Griffin Stadium • Gainesville, Florida

- Date: October 19
- Game time: 7:45 p.m.
- Game weather: Sunny
- Game attendance: 89,906
- Referee: Lee Hedrick
- TV announcers (SECN): Dave Neal (play-by-play), Aaron Murray (analyst) and Marilyn Payne (sideline reporter)

Game information

First quarter

- Florida – Trey Smack 29-yard field goal, 10:27

Second quarter

- Florida – Trey Smack 33-yard field goal, 14:13
- Kentucky – Barion Brown 45-yard pass from Brock Vandagriff, 12:05
- Florida – Jadan Baugh 4-yard run (Trey Smack kick), 8:15
- Florida – Jadan Baugh 10-yard run (Trey Smack kick), 2:10
- Florida – Jadan Baugh 1 yard run (Trey Smack kick), 1:44
- Kentucky – Barion Brown 99-yard kickoff return (Alex Raynor kick), 1:30

Third quarter

- Kentucky – Gavin Wimsatt 1 yard run (Alex Raynor kick), 8:34
- Florida – Jadan Baugh 1 yard run (Trey Smack kick), 3:27

Fourth quarter

- Florida – Jadan Baugh 1 yard run (Trey Smack kick), 3:31
- Florida – Cormani McClain 29-yard interception return (Trey Smack kick), 3:23

Statistics	UK	UF
First downs	17	16
Total yards	68–309	59–476
Rushing yards	36–144	44–197
Passing yards	165	279
Passing: Comp–Att–Int	12–32–3	8–15–1
Time of possession	29:56	30:04

Team	Category	Player	Statistics
Kentucky	Passing	Brock Vandagriff	12/26, 165 yards, TD, 2 INT
Kentucky	Rushing	Demie Sumo-Karngbaye	10 carries, 39 yards
Kentucky	Receiving	Barion Brown	2 receptions, 56 yards, TD
Florida	Passing	DJ Lagway	7/14, 259 yards, INT
Florida	Rushing	Jadan Baugh	22 carries, 106 yards, 5 TD
Florida	Receiving	Elijhah Badger	3 receptions, 148 yards

=== vs Auburn ===
Auburn Tigers (2–5) vs Kentucky Wildcats (3–4) – Game summary

Quarter	1	2	3	4	Total
Tigers	0	10	7	7	24
Wildcats	10	0	0	0	10

at Kroger Field • Lexington, Kentucky

- Date: October 26
- Game time: 7:45 p.m.
- Game weather: Clear • Temperature: 57 °F (14 °C) • Wind: NE 7 mph
- Game attendance: 60,605
- Referee: Steve Marlowe
- TV announcers (SECN): Taylor Zarzour (play-by-play), Matt Stinchcomb (analyst) and Ashley Stroehlein (sideline reporter)

Game information

First Quarter

- UK – Alex Raynor 46–yard field goal, 11:28. Kentucky 3–0. Drive: 7 plays, 47 yards, 3:32.
- UK – Jamarion Wilcox 2–yard run, 8:24. Kentucky 10–0. Drive: 7 plays, 53 yards, 1:49.

Second Quarter

- AUB – KeAndre Lambert-Smith 6–yard pass from Payton Thorne (Alex McPherson kick), 10:56. Kentucky 10–7. Drive: 5 plays, 53 yards, 2:32.
- AUB – Alex McPherson 27–yard field goal, 3:57. Tied 10–10. Drive: 8 plays, 54 yards, 5:09.

Third Quarter

- AUB – Jarquez Hunter 1-yard run (Alex McPherson kick), 7:53. Auburn 17–10. Drive: 14 plays, 75 yards, 7:07.

Fourth Quarter

- AUB – Jarquez Hunter 45-yard run (Alex McPherson kick), 12:11. Auburn 24–10. Drive: 9 plays, 80 yards, 4:45.

Statistics	AUB	UK
First downs	27	13
Total yards	76–498	54–224
Rushing yards	50–326	27–70
Passing yards	172	154
Passing: Comp–Att–Int	20–26–1	12–27–2
Time of possession	35:42	24:18

Team	Category	Player	Statistics
Auburn	Passing	Payton Thorne	20/26, 172 yards, TD, INT
Auburn	Rushing	Jarquez Hunter	23 carries, 278 yards, 2 TD
Auburn	Receiving	KeAndre Lambert-Smith	4 receptions, 53 yards, TD
Kentucky	Passing	Brock Vandagriff	9/17, 120 yards, INT
Kentucky	Rushing	Jason Patterson	6 carries, 38 yards
Kentucky	Receiving	Dane Key	4 receptions, 87 yards

=== at No. 7 Tennessee (rivalry) ===
Kentucky Wildcats (3–5) at No. 7 Tennessee Volunteers (6–1) – Game summary

Quarter	1	2	3	4	Total
Wildcats	7	3	0	8	18
No. 7 Volunteers	0	7	14	7	28

at Neyland Stadium • Knoxville, Tennessee

- Date: November 2
- Game time: 7:45 p.m.
- Game weather: Clear, 62 °F (17 °C)
- Game attendance: 101,915
- Referee: Ken Williamson
- TV announcers (SECN): Tom Hart (play-by-play), Jordan Rodgers (color), and Cole Cubelic (sideline)

Statistics	UK	TENN
First downs	19	29
Total yards	360	477
Rushes/yards	37/168	44/185
Passing yards	192	292
Passing: Comp–Att–Int	14-27-2	28-38-0
Turnovers	3	1
Time of possession	30:32	29:28

Team	Category	Player	Statistics
Kentucky	Passing	Brock Vandagriff	10/17, 123 yards, TD, INT
Kentucky	Rushing	Jamarion Wilcox	17 carries, 102 yards
Kentucky	Receiving	Dane Key	2 receptions, 43 yards
Tennessee	Passing	Nico Iamaleava	28/38, 292 yards, TD
Tennessee	Rushing	Dylan Sampson	27 carries, 142 yards, 2 TD
Tennessee	Receiving	Miles Kitselman	6 receptions, 97 yards, TD

=== vs Murray State (FCS) ===
Murray State Racers (FCS) (1–9) vs Kentucky Wildcats (3–6) – Game summary

Quarter	1	2	3	4	Total
Racers (FCS)	0	0	3	3	6
Wildcats	14	10	10	14	48

at Kroger Field • Lexington, Kentucky

- Date: November 16
- Game time: 1:30 p.m.
- Game attendance: 48,370
- TV announcers (SECN+/ESPN+): Richard Cross (play-by-play) and Charles Arbuckle (analyst)

Statistics	MURR	UK
First downs		
Total yards		
Rushing yards		
Passing yards		
Passing: Comp–Att–Int		
Time of possession		

Team	Category	Player	Statistics
Murray State	Passing		
Murray State	Rushing		
Murray State	Receiving		
Kentucky	Passing		
Kentucky	Rushing		
Kentucky	Receiving		

=== at No. 3 Texas ===
Kentucky Wildcats (4–6) at No. 3 Texas Longhorns (9–1) – Game summary

Quarter	1	2	3	4	Total
Wildcats	0	7	7	0	14
No. 3 Longhorns	7	17	0	7	31

at Darrell K Royal–Texas Memorial Stadium • Austin, Texas

- Date: November 23
- Game time: 3:30 p.m.
- Game weather: Sunny • Temperature: 77 °F (25 °C)
- Game attendance: 102,811
- Referee: Jeff Heaser
- TV announcers (ABC): Joe Tessitore (play-by-play), Jesse Palmer (color), and Katie George (sideline reporter)

Game information

First quarter

- (10:00) TEX – Gunnar Helm 3-yard pass from Quinn Ewers, Bert Auburn kick (Drive: 11 plays, 75 yards, 5:00; Texas 7–0)

Second quarter

- (11:36) UK – Josh Kattus 4-yard pass from Brock Vandagriff, Alex Raynor kick (Drive: 9 plays, 73 yards, 4:08; Tied 7–7)
- (6:39) TEX – Jaydon Blue 5-yard run, Bert Auburn kick (Drive: 11 plays, 65 yards, 4:57; Texas 14–7)
- (3:12) TEX – Gunnar Helm 17-yard pass from Quinn Ewers, Bert Auburn kick (Drive: 4 plays, 34 yards, 1:52; Texas 21–7)
- (0:10) TEX – Bert Auburn 49-yard field goal (Drive: 8 plays, 40 yards, 1:30; Texas 24–7)

Third quarter

- (2:41) UK – Jamon Dumas-Johnson 25-yard fumble recovery, Alex Raynor kick (Texas 24–14)

Fourth quarter

- (3:10) TEX – Quintrevion Wisner 1-yard run, Bert Auburn kick (Drive: 15 plays, 86 yards, 8:22; Texas 31–14)

Statistics	UK	TEX
First downs	14	29
Total yards	232	441
Rushing yards	21	250
Passing yards	211	191
Passing: Comp–Att–Int	13–25–2	20–31–0
Time of possession	25:30	34:30

Team	Category	Player	Statistics
Kentucky	Passing	Cutter Boley	10/18, 160 yards, INT
Kentucky	Rushing	Jamarion Wilcox	11 carries, 50 yards
Kentucky	Receiving	Willie Rodriguez	3 receptions, 53 yards
Texas	Passing	Quinn Ewers	20/31, 191 yards, 2 TD
Texas	Rushing	Quintrevion Wisner	26 carries, 158 yards, TD
Texas	Receiving	Matthew Golden	7 receptions, 86 yards

=== vs Louisville (Governor's Cup) ===
Louisville Cardinals (7–4) vs Kentucky Wildcats (4–7) – Game summary

Quarter	1	2	3	4	Total
Cardinals	7	13	14	7	41
Wildcats	0	0	7	7	14

at Kroger Field • Lexington, Kentucky

- Date: November 30
- Game time: 12:00 p.m.
- Game attendance: 58,612
- TV announcers (SEC Network): Dave Neal (play-by-play), Aaron Murray (analyst) and Ashley ShahAhmadi (sideline)

Game information

First quarter

- (7:07) LOU – Isaac Brown 1-yard run (Brock Travelstead kick) (Drive: 9 plays, 60 yards, 4:02; Louisville 7–0)

Second quarter

- (13:00) LOU – Brock Travelstead 20-yard field goal (Drive: 4 plays, 22 yards, 1:53; Louisville 10–0)
- (11:16) LOU – Duke Watson 58-yard run (Brock Travelstead kick) (Drive: 1 play, 58 yards, 0:09; Louisville 17–0)
- (4:45) LOU – Brock Travelstead 21-yard field goal (Drive: 10 plays, 72 yards, 4:51; Louisville 20–0)

Third quarter

- (9:22) UK – Ja'Mori Maclin 4-yard pass from Gavin Wimsatt (Alex Raynor kick) (Drive: 7 plays, 73 yards, 3:54; Louisville 20–7)
- (4:59) LOU – Ramon Puryear 20-yard fumble return (Brock Travelstead kick) (Louisville 27–7)
- (0:43) LOU – Duke Watson 24-yard run (Brock Travelstead kick) (Drive: 6 plays, 60 yards, 3:21; Louisville 34–7)

Fourth quarter

- (9:49) UK – Ja'Mori Maclin 83-yard pass from Gavin Wimsatt (Alex Raynor kick) (Drive: 3 plays, 95 yards, 1:28; Louisville 34–14)
- (9:01) LOU – Isaac Brown 67-yard run (Brock Travelstead kick) (Drive: 2 plays, 75 yards, 0:48; Louisville 41–14)

Statistics	LOU	UK
First downs	23	13
Total yards	486	328
Rushing yards	358	155
Passing yards	128	173
Passing: Comp–Att–Int	9–18–0	10–24–3
Time of possession	35:03	24:57

Team	Category	Player	Statistics
Louisville	Passing	Tyler Shough	9–18, 128 yards
Louisville	Rushing	Isaac Brown	26 carries, 178 yards, 2 TD
Louisville	Receiving	Chris Bell	3 receptions, 84 yards
Kentucky	Passing	Gavin Wimsatt	4–9, 125 yards, 2 TD, INT
Kentucky	Rushing	Jamarion Wilcox	12 carries, 66 yards
Kentucky	Receiving	Ja'Mori Maclin	3 receptions, 121 yards, 2 TD

== Rankings ==
Ranking movements Legend: ██ Increase in ranking ██ Decrease in ranking — = Not ranked RV = Received votes
	Week																
Poll	Pre	1	2	3	4	5	6	7	8	9	10	11	12	13	14	15	Final
AP	—	RV	—	—	—	—	—	—	—	—	—	—	—	—	—	—	—
Coaches	RV	RV	—	—	—	—	—	—	—	—	—	—	—	—	—	—	—
CFP	Not released										—	—	—	—	—	—	Not released

== Coaching staff ==
Name	Position	Years at Kentucky
Mark Stoops	Head coach	12th
Vince Marrow	Associate head coach/tight ends coach	12th
Bush Hamdan	Offensive coordinator/quarterbacks coach	1st
Brad White	Defensive coordinator/outside linebackers coach	6th
Jay Boulware	Running backs coach	2nd
Mike Stoops	Inside linebackers coach	3rd
Frank Buffano	Safeties coach	5th
Chris Collins	Defensive backs coach	4th
Eric Wolford	Offensive line coach	2nd
Daikiel Shorts Jr	Wide receivers coach	1st
Anwar Stewart	Defensive line coach	5th
Mark Hill	Strength and conditioning	9th
