= Joey Slackman =

American football player (born 2001)

No. 97
- Position: Defensive tackle

Personal information
- Born: April 11, 2001 (age 25); Commack, New York, U.S.
- Listed height: 6 ft 4 in (1.93 m)
- Listed weight: 304 lb (138 kg)

Career information
- High school: Commack (Commack, New York)
- College: Penn (2021–2023); Florida (2024)

Awards and highlights
- Ivy League Defensive Player of the Year (2023); First team All-Ivy League (2023)
- Stats at ESPN

Joey Slackman (born April 11, 2001) is an American football defensive tackle who currently serves as a scouting assistant for the Houston Texans of the National Football League (NFL). He played college football for the Penn Quakers and Florida Gators.

== Early life ==
Slackman grew up in Commack, New York and attended Commack High School, where he was a member of the football, wrestling and tennis teams. He was a two-time All-American wrestler in high school. Slackman committed to wrestle at the University of Pennsylvania.

== Playing career ==
=== Penn ===
Slackman initially was a member of the Penn Quakers wrestling team. He tore his ACL and meniscus during his freshman season. While recovering from his injury he joined the roster of the Penn football team. After the Ivy League announced that they would cancel athletics for the 2020–21 academic year due to the COVID-19 pandemic, Slackman took a gap year and interned at the Attorney General of Delaware's office while also volunteering for a wrestling-focused non-profit in Philadelphia.

Slackman had 16 tackles, 3.5 tackles for loss, 2.5 sacks, and a forced fumble in his first football season. As a junior, he made 49 tackles with 9.5 tackles for loss, 4.5 sacks, one forced fumble, and two passes defended and was named honorable mention All-Ivy League. As a senior, Slackman was named the Ivy League Defensive Player of the Year and first team All-Ivy League after finishing the season with 50 tackles, 12 tackles for loss, and 4 sacks. After the season, Slackman decided to utilize the extra year of eligibility granted to college athletes who were active during the 2020-2021 school year due to the coronavirus pandemic and entered the NCAA transfer portal.

=== Florida ===
On December 17, 2023, Slackman ultimately transferred to Florida.

== Post-playing career ==
On June 7, 2026, the Houston Texans hired Slackman to serve as a scouting assistant.
