= 2024 Gasparilla Bowl =

Postseason college football bowl game

2024 Union Home Mortgage Gasparilla Bowl
- 16th Gasparilla Bowl
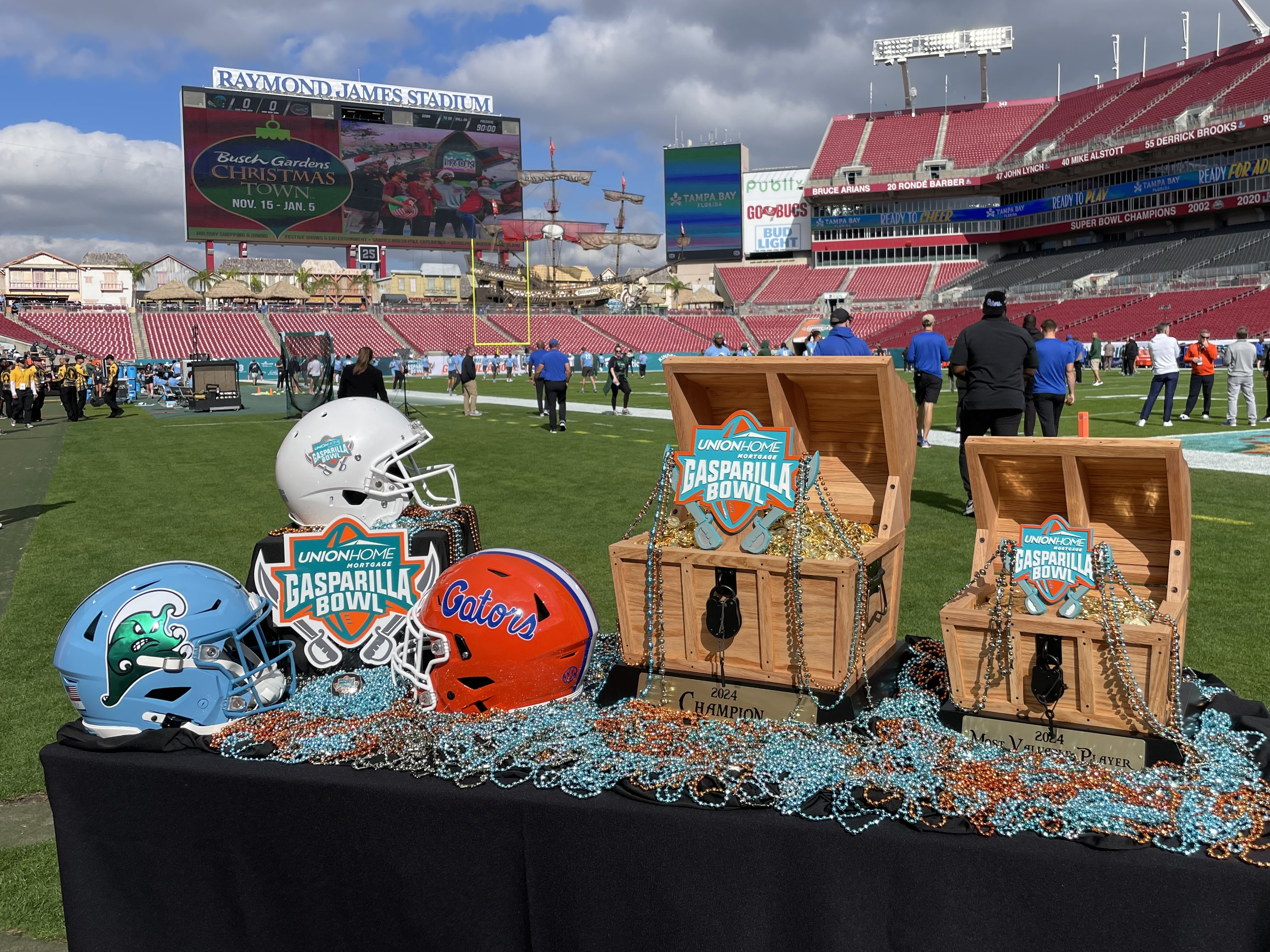
- Pregame photo from the field.
Tulane Green Wave	Florida Gators
(9–4)	(7–5)
The American	SEC
8	33
Head coach: Jon Sumrall	Head coach: Billy Napier
	1	2	3	4	Total
Tulane	0	0	0	8	8
Florida	3	3	10	17	33
- Date: December 20, 2024
- Season: 2024
- Stadium: Raymond James Stadium
- Location: Tampa, Florida
- MVP: DJ Lagway (QB, Florida)
- Referee: Matt Packowski (MAC)
- Attendance: 41,472

United States TV coverage
- Network: ESPN2
- Announcers: Anish Shroff (play-by-play), Andre Ware (analyst), and Paul Carcaterra (sideline)

The 2024 Gasparilla Bowl was a college football bowl game played on December 20, 2024, at Raymond James Stadium located in Tampa, Florida. The 16th annual Gasparilla Bowl game featured the Tulane Green Wave and Florida Gators. The Gasparilla Bowl was one of the 2024–25 bowl games concluding the 2024 FBS football season. Sponsored by mortgage loan company Union Home Mortgage, the game was officially known as the Union Home Mortgage Gasparilla Bowl.

== Teams ==
The game featured Florida of the Southeastern Conference (SEC) and Tulane of the American Athletic Conference (AAC or "The American"). This was the 22nd all-time meeting between Florida and Tulane, although their first meeting since 1984; entering the Gasparilla Bowl, the Gators led the all-time series, 13–6–2. From 1932 to 1965, the Gators and Green Wave were conference-mates in the SEC before Tulane left due to increasing competitive disparity.

=== Florida Gators ===
Florida entered the bowl with a 7–5 record (4–4 in conference). The Gators faced six ranked opponents during their regular season, defeating LSU and Ole Miss while losing to Miami (FL), Tennessee, Georgia, and Texas.

=== Tulane Green Wave ===
Tulane entered the bowl with a 9–4 record (7–1 in conference). The Green Wave faced and lost to two ranked teams during their regular season, Kansas State and Oklahoma. Tulane qualified for the AAC Championship Game, which they lost to 24th-ranked Army, 35–14.

== Game summary ==
2024 Union Home Mortgage Gasparilla Bowl

Quarter	1	2	3	4	Total
Tulane	0	0	0	8	8
Florida	3	3	10	17	33

at Raymond James Stadium • Tampa, Florida

- Date: Friday, December 20, 2024
- Game time: 3:36 p.m. EST
- Game weather: Sunny • Temperature: 66 °F (19 °C) • Wind: 15 mph (24 km/h) northwest
- Game attendance: 41,472
- Referee: Matt Packowski
- TV announcers (ESPN2): Anish Shroff (play-by-play), Andre Ware (analyst), and Paul Carcaterra (sideline)
- Box score

Game information

First quarter

- (07:48) FLA – Trey Smack 34-yard field goal (Drive: 9 plays, 61 yards, 4:55; Florida 3–0)

Second quarter

- (09:12) FLA – Trey Smack 44-yard field goal (Drive: 9 plays, 54 yards, 5:41; Florida 6–0)

Third quarter

- (09:11) FLA – Trey Smack 24-yard field goal (Drive: 10 plays, 59 yards, 3:58; Florida 9–0)
- (04:03) FLA – Tony Livingston 7-yard pass from DJ Lagway, Trey Smack kick (Drive: 7 plays, 60 yards, 3:22; Florida 16–0)

Fourth quarter

- (13:03) FLA – Trey Smack 30-yard field goal (Drive: 7 plays, 35 yards, 3:01; Florida 19–0)
- (06:29) FLA – KD Daniels 25-yard run, Trey Smack kick (Drive: 4 plays, 34 yards, 1:30; Florida 26–0)
- (01:11) FLA – Anthony Rubio 9-yard run, Trey Smack kick (Drive: 9 plays, 47 yards, 4:43; Florida 33–0)
- (00:29) TUL – Mario Williams 16-yard pass from Ty Thompson, Ty Thompson pass to Zycarl Lewis Jr. for 2-point conversion (Drive: 5 plays, 55 yards, 0:42; Florida 33–8)

=== Statistics ===
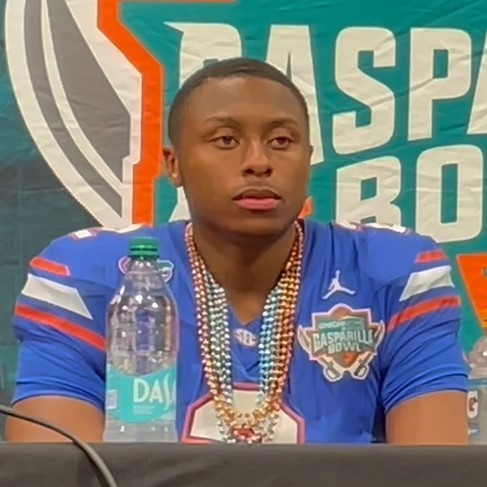
The game's MVP, Florida quarterback DJ Lagway

.

Statistics	TUL	UF
First downs	11	26
Plays–yards	57–194	79–529
Rushes–yards	27–69	44–224
Passing yards	125	305
Passing: comp–att–int	11–30–3	22–35–2
Time of possession	21:03	38:57

Team	Category	Player	Statistics
Tulane	Passing	Ty Thompson	11/29, 125 yards, TD, 3 INT
Tulane	Rushing	Makhi Hughes	8 carries, 29 yards
Tulane	Receiving	Mario Williams	6 receptions, 91 yards, TD
Florida	Passing	DJ Lagway	22/35, 305 yards, TD, 2 INT
Florida	Rushing	Jadan Baugh	14 carries, 70 yards
Florida	Receiving	Chimere Dike	6 receptions, 96 yards

== See also ==
- 2024 ReliaQuest Bowl (December), contested at the same venue 11 days later
