= DJ Lagway =

American football player (born 2005)

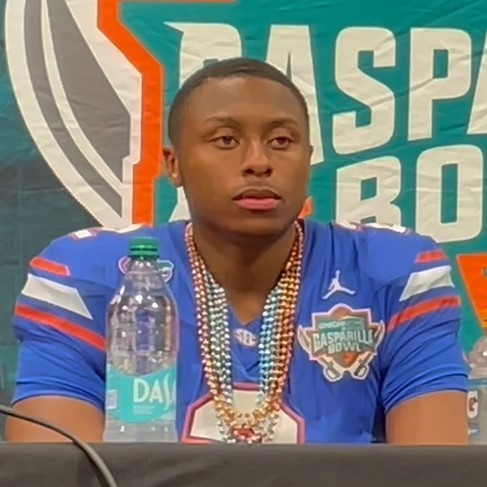
- Lagway after the 2024 Gasparilla Bowl

No. 2 – Baylor Bears
- Position: Quarterback
- Class: Junior

Personal information
- Born: August 13, 2005 (age 21); Willis, Texas, U.S.
- Listed height: 6 ft 3 in (1.91 m)
- Listed weight: 239 lb (108 kg)

Career information
- High school: Willis (Willis, Texas)
- College: Florida (2024–2025); Baylor (2026–present)

Awards and highlights
- USA Today Offensive Player of the Year (2023); Mr. Texas Football (2023); Gatorade Football Player of the Year (2023)
- Stats at ESPN

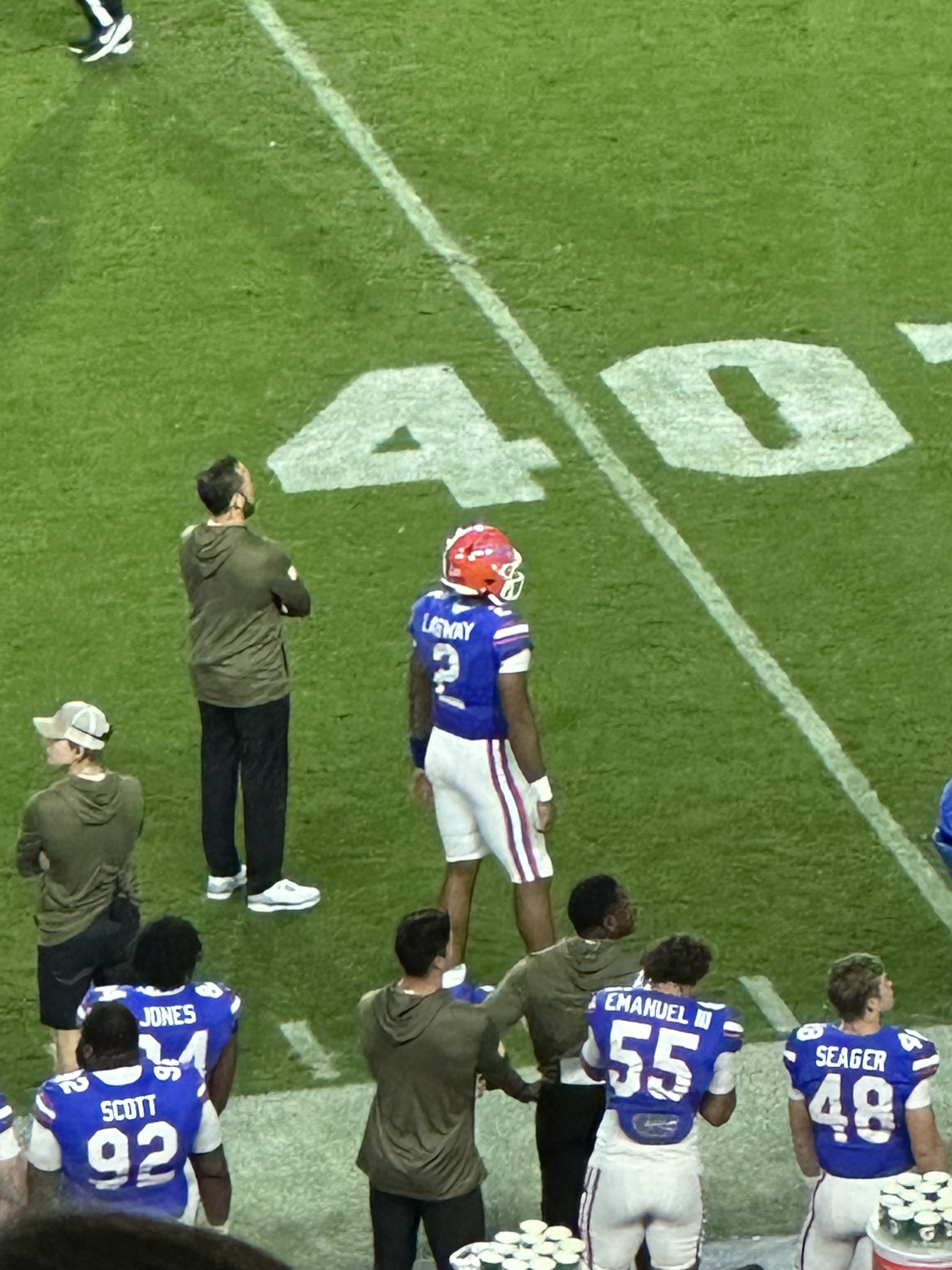
DJ Lagway on the sidelines at Ben Hill Griffin Stadium during the 2025 season.

Derek "DJ" Lagway Jr. (born August 13, 2005) is an American college football quarterback for the Baylor Bears. He previously played for the Florida Gators.

== Early life ==
Lagway attended Willis High School in Willis, Texas. As a junior in 2022, he passed for 2,081 yards with 24 touchdowns and five interceptions. Prior to his senior season in 2023, Lagway participated in the Elite 11. As a senior, he passed for 4,631 yards with a Texas Class 6A record 58 touchdown passes, and added 975 rushing yards with 15 touchdowns. He was named the USA Today Offensive Player of the Year, MaxPreps National Player of the Year and Mr. Texas Football. For his career, Lagway had 8,392 passing yards and 100 passing touchdowns with 2,196 rushing yards and 29 rushing touchdowns.

A five-star recruit, Lagway committed to the University of Florida to play college football.

== College career ==
=== Florida ===
==== 2024: Freshman season ====
Lagway entered his true freshman season with the Florida Gators in 2024 as the backup to Graham Mertz. After Mertz was placed in concussion protocol following the season opener against Miami, Lagway was named the starting quarterback against Samford. In his first start, Lagway threw for 456 yards and three touchdowns. Over the following few games, Lagway split playing time with Mertz. Mertz suffered a season-ending injury against Tennessee and Lagway was inserted as the team's starting quarterback for the remainder of the season.

Lagway's first game after Mertz's injury was a 48–20 victory over rival Kentucky. In his start against Georgia, Lagway suffered a left hamstring injury and was carted off. After missing only one game of action, he returned for the final three games of the regular season, defeating #22 LSU, #9 Ole Miss, and Florida State. He also started when the Gators defeated Tulane 33-8 in the 2024 Gasparilla Bowl.

In his seven starts, he helped lead Florida to a 6–1 record and a bowl win.

==== 2025: Sophomore season ====
Lagway opened the season as the starting quarterback. Against the LSU Tigers he suffered the worst performance of his career, finishing 33 of 49 for 287 yards, one touchdown, and 5 interceptions. The Gators lost the game 20–10, with one of the two touchdowns allowed coming off of a Lagway interception. Against the Texas Longhorns, Lagway passed for 298 yards in the Gators 29–21 victory and he was named the SEC Offensive Player of the Week. Lagway followed up his performance against Texas by throwing for two touchdowns in a loss versus Texas A&M, as well as two interceptions in a win versus Mississippi State, after which Florida coach Billy Napier was fired and wide receivers coach Billy Gonzales was elevated to interim head coach. On December 15, 2025, Lagway announced he was entering the NCAA transfer portal with two years of eligibility remaining.

=== Baylor ===
==== 2026: Junior season ====
On January 8, 2026, Lagway committed to the Baylor Bears, becoming the highest rated recruit to ever play for Baylor.

=== Statistics ===
Season	Team	Games			Passing								Rushing			
Season	Team	GP	GS	Record	Cmp	Att	Pct	Yds	Avg	TD	Int	Rtg	Att	Yds	Avg	TD
2024	Florida	12	7	6−1	115	192	59.9	1,915	10.0	12	9	154.9	50	101	2.0	0
2025	Florida	12	12	4–8	213	337	63.2	2,264	6.7	16	14	127.0	71	136	1.9	1
2026	Baylor	7	7	4–3	145	270	53.7	1,900	7.0	15	4	127.8	50	161	3.2	2
Career		31	26	14–12	473	799	59.2	6,079	7.6	43	27	134.1	171	398	2.3	3

== Personal life ==
He is the son of Derek and Nikita Nephew Lagway. His father, Derek Lagway, played college football at Baylor University.
