= Billy Napier =

American football coach (born 1979)

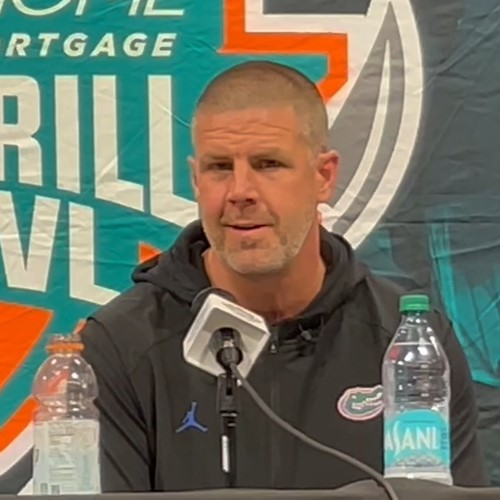
- Napier after the 2024 Gasparilla Bowl

Current position
- Title: Head coach
- Team: James Madison
- Conference: Sun Belt
- Record: 8–3

Biographical details
- Born: July 21, 1979 (age 47); Cookeville, Tennessee, U.S.

Playing career
- 1999–2002: Furman
- Position: Quarterback

Coaching career (HC unless noted)
- 2003–2004: Clemson (GA)
- 2005: South Carolina State (QB)
- 2006–2008: Clemson (TE/RC)
- 2009–2010: Clemson (OC/QB)
- 2011: Alabama (analyst)
- 2012: Colorado State (AHC/QB)
- 2013–2016: Alabama (WR)
- 2017: Arizona State (OC/QB)
- 2018–2021: Louisiana
- 2022–2025: Florida
- 2026–present: James Madison

Head coaching record
- Overall: 70–38
- Bowls: 3–2

Accomplishments and honors

Championships
- As a head coach 2 Sun Belt (2020–2021); 4 Sun Belt West (2018–2021) As an assistant coach 2 National (2011, 2015); 3 SEC (2014–2016); 3 SEC West (2013–2016)

Awards
- 2× Sun Belt Coach of the Year (2019, 2021)

William Hall Napier (born July 21, 1979) is an American football coach who is currently the head football coach at James Madison University. He previously served as head coach at the University of Louisiana at Lafayette from 2018 to 2021 and the University of Florida from 2022 to 2025. At Louisiana, he amassed a 40–12 record in four seasons with three consecutive 10+ win seasons and two seasons finishing in the AP Poll, both firsts in the program's history. Before becoming a head coach, he was the offensive coordinator and quarterbacks coach at Arizona State University in 2017.

== Playing career ==
Born in Cookeville, Tennessee, Napier was a standout wide receiver before switching to quarterback for Murray County High School in his hometown of Chatsworth, Georgia, where he played for his father who was his head coach. He was named All-State in 1997 and accepted a scholarship to play football at Furman University. During his time with the Furman Paladins, Napier was a four-time letterman, and took over the starting quarterback duties for his junior and senior seasons. The Paladins won two conference championships during Napier's time there, and he was selected to two All-Southern Conference teams at quarterback. In his junior year, he led his team to the 2001 NCAA Division I-AA Football Championship Game, losing to Montana, 13–6. He earned second-team All-Southern Conference honors in 2001 and 2002. Napier was college teammates with NEEDTOBREATHE vocalist Bear Rinehart from 1999-2002; the pair set numerous team records together.

== Coaching career ==
=== Assistant coaching ===
==== Early coaching career (Clemson, SC State) ====
After graduating from Furman, Napier headed to Clemson as a graduate assistant. Following a two-year stint as a GA at Clemson, he was then hired as the QB coach at South Carolina State in 2004. After only one year with SC State, Napier chose to return to Clemson when he accepted a job with dual roles as tight ends coach and recruiting coordinator on Tommy Bowden's staff. In his third year as TE coach and recruiting coordinator, Tommy Bowden resigned midseason after early season struggles that failed to meet high expectations, and Napier gave up his roles as RC and TE coach when he was named QB coach by newly appointed interim head coach Dabo Swinney. His new role also included assisting Swinney with the playcalling duties for the remainder of the year.

When Swinney was promoted from interim head coach to full-time head coach after the 2008 season, Napier was promoted to offensive coordinator while retaining his duties as QB coach. After a 2009 season where Clemson would go on to win the ACC Atlantic Division behind the strength of Napier's offense that scored a then school record 436 points,

==== Alabama, Colorado State, Florida State, and Arizona State ====
A steep reduction in Clemson's offensive output led to Napier's termination at the end of the 2010 season. Within only a few weeks of being dismissed as OC at Clemson, Napier was contacted by Nick Saban from Alabama and offered a job as an offensive analyst. After spending the 2011 season as an analyst on Saban's staff, Napier earned a championship ring following Alabama's win over LSU in the BCS National Championship Game. As a result of his experience under Saban during the 2011 season as well as the time spent working closely with fellow Alabama assistant Jim McElwain, Napier was able to get back into hands-on coaching by following McElwain to Colorado State to become the QB coach and assistant head coach. Napier did not stay in Colorado for long—he was hired in January 2013 by Jimbo Fisher, then head coach at Florida State, to be the team's tight ends coach and recruiting coordinator, but departed less than a month later as Saban brought him back to Tuscaloosa to take over from Mike Groh as WR coach going into the 2013 season.

After a four-year stint as Alabama's WR coach including a second national championship in January 2016, he was hired by Todd Graham to become offensive coordinator at Arizona State. In Napier's first season back at OC since being fired as Clemson's OC back in 2010, his offense led Arizona State to finish with a 7–5 record and a Sun Bowl trip. Arizona State fired head coach Todd Graham after the 2017 season and brought in former NFL coach Herm Edwards, who stated publicly that Napier would be able to continue in his role as OC if he would like. However, Napier declined the opportunity to remain at ASU as the offensive coordinator.

=== Louisiana ===
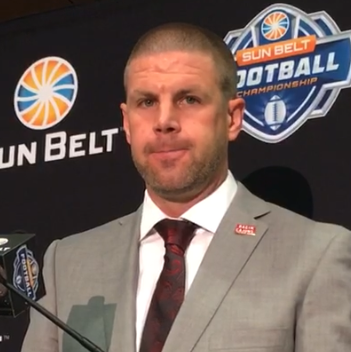
Napier at the 2018 Sun Belt Media Day

On December 15, 2017, Napier was named the 26th football head coach at the University of Louisiana at Lafayette replacing Mark Hudspeth. His first season with the team resulted in a win of the Sun Belt Conference's West division and a bowl appearance (a Cure Bowl loss to the Tulane Green Wave), with a 5–3 conference record and a 7–7 overall record.

Prior to the 2019 season, Napier's Cajuns were picked to finish first in the West Division and picked to finish second in the conference one vote behind Appalachian State. In addition, eight of his Cajuns were selected to the preseason all-conference team, a feat not accomplished since the early Hudspeth years. Napier's 2019 Cajuns finished with an 11–3 overall record (7–1 conference) and defeated the Miami RedHawks 27–17 in the 2020 LendingTree Bowl (January), his first bowl victory with the Cajuns and as a head coach. The following season, the Cajuns won 2020 First Responder Bowl .

Napier's success in the Sun Belt led to the nickname "Sun Belt Billy."

=== Florida ===
On November 28, 2021, Napier was named the 28th head football coach at the University of Florida, replacing Dan Mullen. He was officially announced by Florida via a press conference on December 5, 2021.

Napier amassed two losing seasons and 11–14 record in his first two years at Florida, including a 1-5 record against the Gators' biggest rivals, but was retained despite some calls for his dismissal due to his work improving the behind the scenes aspects of the program. Many observers called Florida's 2024 slate the most difficult schedule in the nation, and it began with a lopsided loss to the Miami Hurricanes at Florida Field. This was Florida's first loss in a home opener since 1989 and the most points (41) given up in a home opener in program history. Florida's record stood at 4-5 when the emergence of freshman quarterback DJ Lagway saw them win four straight games to end the season, including two over ranked opponents and a victory in the Gasparilla Bowl, saving Napier's job and raising expectations.

However, the Gators were upset at home by USF (Florida's first ever loss to the Bulls) early in the 2025 season and followed that with lopsided losses to SEC opponents in which the offense struggled to score. Despite a home upset of Texas, the Gators had a 3-4 record by mid-October, leading to Napier's dismissal.

Napier's three-plus seasons at Florida saw the program revamp its recruiting and organizational structure, but off-field improvements did not translate into enough wins; his record of 22–23 was the worst winning percentage by a non-interim Florida head coach since Raymond Wolf, who coached in the late 1940s. Many observers in particular pointed to offensive struggles as the main reason for sub-par seasons. Though he had an offensive coordinator on staff, Napier insisted on remaining the offensive playcaller throughout his Florida tenure despite calls to give up that responsibility from fans, the media and, as was later reported, by UF athletic director Scott Stricklin as well.

=== James Madison ===
On December 4, 2025 Napier was hired to succeed Bob Chesney as the head coach of James Madison following Chesney taking the same position at UCLA.

== Personal life ==
Napier resides in Gainesville, Florida, with his wife, Ali, and three children. He is a Christian. Napier's brother, Matt, is the head football coach at LaGrange High School in LaGrange, Georgia.

== Head coaching record ==
| Year | Team | Overall | Conference | Standing | Bowl/playoffs | Coaches^{#} | AP^{°} |
|---|---|---|---|---|---|---|---|
Louisiana Ragin' Cajuns (Sun Belt Conference) (2018–2021)
| 2018 | Louisiana | 7–7 | 5–3 | T–1st (West) | L Cure | | |
| 2019 | Louisiana | 11–3 | 7–1 | 1st (West) | W LendingTree | | |
| 2020 | Louisiana | 10–1 | 7–1 | 1st (West) | W First Responder | 16 | 15 |
| 2021 | Louisiana | 12–1 | 8–0 | 1st (West) | New Orleans (Note: Napier left for Florida before UL's bowl game) | 18 | 16 |
| Louisiana: | | 40–12 | 27–5 | | | | |
Florida Gators (Southeastern Conference) (2022–2025)
| 2022 | Florida | 6–7 | 3–5 | T–4th (Eastern) | L Las Vegas | | |
| 2023 | Florida | 5–7 | 3–5 | T–4th (Eastern) | | | |
| 2024 | Florida | 8–5 | 4–4 | 10th | W Gasparilla | | |
| 2025 | Florida | 3–4 (Note: Florida fired Napier after seven games.) | 2–2 | | | | |
| Florida: | | 22–23 | 12–16 | | | | |
James Madison Dukes (Sun Belt Conference) (2026–present)
| 2026 | James Madison | 8–3 | 5–2 | | | | |
| James Madison: | | 8–3 | 5–2 | | | | |
| Total: | | 70–38 | | | | | |
National championship Conference title Conference division title or championship game berth
