= 2024 Tennessee Volunteers football team =

American college football season

2024 Tennessee Volunteers football

CFP First Round, L 17–42 at Ohio State
- Conference: Southeastern Conference

Ranking
- Coaches: No. 8
- AP: No. 9
- Record: 10–3 (6–2 SEC)
- Head coach: Josh Heupel (4th season)
- Offensive coordinator: Joey Halzle (2nd season)
- Offensive scheme: Veer and shoot
- Defensive coordinator: Tim Banks (4th season)
- Base defense: Multiple 4–3
- Home stadium: Neyland Stadium

2024 Southeastern Conference football standings
	Conf.			Overall
Team	W		L	W		L
No. 4 Texas y^	7	–	1	13	–	3
No. 6 Georgia y$^	6	–	2	11	–	3
No. 9 Tennessee ^	6	–	2	10	–	3
No. 22 Missouri	5	–	3	10	–	3
No. 11 Ole Miss	5	–	3	10	–	3
No. 17 Alabama	5	–	3	9	–	4
No. 19 South Carolina	5	–	3	9	–	4
LSU	5	–	3	9	–	4
Texas A&M	5	–	3	8	–	5
Florida	4	–	4	8	–	5
Arkansas	3	–	5	7	–	6
Vanderbilt	3	–	5	7	–	6
Oklahoma	2	–	6	6	–	7
Auburn	2	–	6	5	–	7
Kentucky	1	–	7	4	–	8
Mississippi State	0	–	8	2	–	10
Championship: Georgia 22, Texas 19 ^{OT}
^ – College Football Playoff participant; $ – Conference champion; y – Championship game participant; Rankings from AP Poll

The 2024 Tennessee Volunteers football team represented the University of Tennessee in the Southeastern Conference (SEC) during the 2024 NCAA Division I FBS football season. The Volunteers head coach was Josh Heupel, in his fourth year. The team played its home games at Neyland Stadium in Knoxville, Tennessee.

The Volunteers achieved their second 10-win regular season under Heupel, and their first since the 2022 season, following a 36–23 victory over rival Vanderbilt. Heupel became only the third coach in school history to record multiple 10-win regular seasons alongside Robert Neyland and Phillip Fulmer. Nico Iamaleava became the first quarterback to start for 10 wins in a single season at Tennessee since Casey Clausen in the 2003 season. Running back Dylan Sampson set single-season school records for rushing yards (1,485) and rushing and total touchdowns (22), while also leading the SEC in carries (256), rushing yards, rushing yards per game (123.8), and rushing touchdowns. He was named SEC Offensive Player of the Year and first-team All-SEC. The Volunteers were selected to compete as the No. 9 seed in the first 12-team bracket of the College Football Playoff, losing 42–17 to the eventual champions Ohio State in the first round.

== Offseason ==
=== Transfers ===
==== Outgoing ====
Player	Position	Destination
Gerald Mincey	OT	Kentucky
Wesley Walker	S	Michigan
Tamarion McDonald	S	Louisville
Doneiko Slaughter	CB	Arkansas
De'Shawn Rucker	CB	South Florida
Tyler Baron	EDGE	Miami (FL)
Connor Meadows	OL	Tennessee State
Addison Nichols	OL	Arkansas
Mo Clipper Jr.	OL	Charlotte
Jack Luttrel	S	Arizona
Brandon Turnage	CB	Ole Miss
Warren Burrell	CB	Georgia Tech
Elijah Herring	LB	Memphis

==== Incoming ====
Player	Position	Former Team
Miles Kitselman	TE	Alabama
Zalance Heard	OL	LSU
Jakobe Thomas	S	Middle Tennessee
Holden Staes	TE	Notre Dame
Jermod McCoy	CB	Oregon State
Jaxson Moi	DL	Stanford
Jalen McMurray	CB	Temple
Chris Brazzell II	WR	Tulane
Eli Purcell	LB	Wofford

== Schedule ==
Date	Time	Opponent	Rank	Site	TV	Result	Attendance
August 31	12:45 p.m.	No. 9 (FCS) Chattanooga*	No. 15	Neyland Stadium; Knoxville, TN	SECN	W 69–3	101,915
September 7	7:30 p.m.	vs. No. 24 NC State*	No. 14	Bank of America Stadium; Charlotte, NC (Duke's Mayo Classic)	ABC	W 51–10	72,730
September 14	7:45 p.m.	Kent State*	No. 7	Neyland Stadium; Knoxville, TN	SECN	W 71–0	101,915
September 21	7:30 p.m.	at No. 15 Oklahoma	No. 6	Gaylord Family Oklahoma Memorial Stadium; Norman, OK (College GameDay)	ABC	W 25–15	84,701
October 5	7:30 p.m.	at Arkansas	No. 4	Donald W. Reynolds Razorback Stadium; Fayetteville, AR	ABC	L 14–19	75,573
October 12	7:00 p.m.	Florida	No. 8	Neyland Stadium; Knoxville, TN (rivalry)	ESPN	W 23–17 ^{OT}	101,915
October 19	3:30 p.m.	No. 7 Alabama	No. 11	Neyland Stadium; Knoxville, TN (Third Saturday in October, SEC Nation)	ABC	W 24–17	101,915
November 2	7:45 p.m.	Kentucky	No. 7	Neyland Stadium; Knoxville, TN (rivalry)	SECN	W 28–18	101,915
November 9	7:00 p.m.	Mississippi State^{†}	No. 7	Neyland Stadium; Knoxville, TN	ESPN	W 33–14	101,915
November 16	7:30 p.m.	at No. 12 Georgia	No. 7	Sanford Stadium; Athens, GA (rivalry, College GameDay, SEC Nation)	ABC	L 17–31	93,033
November 23	1:00 p.m.	UTEP*	No. 11	Neyland Stadium; Knoxville, TN	SECN+/ESPN+	W 56–0	101,915
November 30	12:00 p.m.	at Vanderbilt	No. 8	FirstBank Stadium; Nashville, TN (rivalry)	ABC	W 36–23	28,934
December 21	8:00 p.m.	at (8) No. 6 Ohio State*	(9) No. 7	Ohio Stadium; Columbus, OH (CFP First Round, College GameDay)	ESPN/ABC	L 17–42	102,819
*Non-conference game; ^{†}Homecoming; Rankings from AP Poll (and CFP Rankings, after November 5) – Released prior to game; All times are in Eastern time

== Rankings ==
Ranking movements Legend: ██ Increase in ranking ██ Decrease in ranking
	Week																
Poll	Pre	1	2	3	4	5	6	7	8	9	10	11	12	13	14	15	Final
AP	15	14	7	6	5	4	8	11	7	7	7	6	10	7	6	7	9
Coaches	15	12	9	7	6	4	9	10	8	7	6	4	11	8	6	6	8
CFP	Not released										7	7	11	8	7	7	Not released

== Game summaries ==
=== vs. No. 9 (FCS) Chattanooga ===
Game One – No. 9 (FCS) Chattanooga Mocs (0–0) vs No. 15 Tennessee Volunteers (0–0)

Quarter	1	2	3	4	Total
No. 9 (FCS) Mocs	0	0	3	0	3
No. 15 Volunteers	24	21	10	14	69

at Neyland Stadium • Knoxville, Tennessee

- Date: August 31, 2024
- Game time: 12:45 p.m.
- Game weather: Sunny, 87 °F (31 °C)
- Game attendance: 101,915
- Referee: Jason Autrey
- TV announcers (SECN): Taylor Zarzour (play-by-play), Matt Stinchcomb (analyst), and Alyssa Lang (sideline)

Game information

First quarter

- (11:09) TENN – Dylan Sampson 1-yard run (Max Gilbert kick) (Drive: 11 plays, 65 yards, 3:43; Tennessee 7–0)
- (08:34) TENN – Ethan Davis 4-yard pass from Nico Iamaleava (Max Gilbert kick) (Drive: 4 plays, 35 yards, 1:03; Tennessee 14–0)
- (07:18) TENN – Dont'e Thornton Jr. 36-yard pass from Nico Iamaleava (Max Gilbert kick) (Drive: 2 plays, 59 yards, 0:26; Tennessee 21–0)
- (08:34) TENN – Max Gilbert 36-yard field goal (Drive: 8 plays, 72 yards, 2:28; Tennessee 24–0)

Second quarter

- (14:03) TENN – Dylan Sampson 3-yard run (Max Gilbert kick) (Drive: 6 plays, 78 yards, 1:59; Tennessee 31–0)
- (10:14) TENN – Dont'e Thornton Jr. 10-yard pass from Nico Iamaleava (Max Gilbert kick) (Drive: 9 plays, 79 yards, 1:55; Tennessee 38–0)
- (06:43) TENN – Dylan Sampson 5-yard run (Max Gilbert kick) (Drive: 2 plays, 61 yards, 0:16; Tennessee 45–0)

Third quarter

- (10:10) UTC – Jude Kelley 43-yard field goal (Drive: 9 plays, 50 yards, 4:50; Tennessee 45–3)
- (07:15) TENN – Max Gilbert 42-yard field goal (Drive: 9 plays, 45 yards, 2:54; Tennessee 48–3)
- (01:13) TENN – DeSean Bishop 3-yard run (Max Gilbert kick) (Drive: 6 plays, 63 yards, 1:33; Tennessee 55–3)

Fourth quarter

- (04:06) TENN – Khalifa Keith 1-yard run (Josh Turbyville kick) (Drive: 17 plays, 80 yards, 7:05; Tennessee 62–3)
- (01:07) TENN – Jordan Ross 13-yard punt return (Josh Turbyville kick) (Tennessee 69–3)

Statistics	UTC	TENN
First downs	10	36
Total yards	227	718
Rushes/yards	35/92	46/311
Passing yards	153	414
Passing: Comp–Att–Int	13–24–0	33–44–1
Turnovers	0	1
Time of possession	30:46	29:10

Team	Category	Player	Statistics
Chattanooga	Passing	Chase Artopoeus	12/23, 141 yards
Chattanooga	Rushing	Reggie Davis	20 carries, 59 yards
Chattanooga	Receiving	Sam Philips	5 receptions, 54 yards
Tennessee	Passing	Nico Iamaleava	22/28, 314 yards, 3 TD
Tennessee	Rushing	Dylan Sampson	12 carries, 124 yards, 3 TD
Tennessee	Receiving	Dont'e Thornton Jr.	3 receptions, 105 yards, 2 TD

=== vs. No. 24 NC State ===
Game Two – No. 14 Tennessee Volunteers (1–0) vs No. 24 NC State Wolfpack (1–0) – Game summary

Quarter	1	2	3	4	Total
No. 14 Volunteers	7	13	17	14	51
No. 24 Wolfpack	0	3	7	0	10

at Bank of America Stadium • Charlotte, NC

- Date: September 7, 2024
- Game time: 7:30 PM
- Game weather: Sunny, 75 °F (24 °C)
- Game attendance: 72,730
- Referee: Kole Knueppel
- TV announcers (ABC): Rece Davis (play-by-play), Kirk Herbstreit (analyst), and Holly Rowe (sideline)

Game information

First quarter

- (00:09) TENN – Dylan Sampson 9-yard run (Max Gilbert kick) (Drive: 9 plays, 62 yards, 4:10; Tennessee 7–0)

Second quarter

- (09:04) NCST – Kanoah Vinesett 24-yard field goal (Drive: 6 plays, 40 yards, 2:30; Tennessee 7–3)
- (06:33) TENN – Max Gilbert 32-yard field goal (Drive: 7 plays, 61 yards, 2:31; Tennessee 10–3)
- (03:29) TENN – Will Brooks 85-yard interception (Max Gilbert kick) (Tennessee 17–3)
- (00:00) TENN – Max Gilbert 45-yard field goal (Drive: 6 plays, 18 yards, 1:44; Tennessee 20–3)

Third quarter

- (10:27) TENN – Miles Kitselman 15-yard pass from Nico Iamaleava (Max Gilbert kick) (Drive: 10 plays, 75 yards, 4:33; Tennessee 27–3)
- (06:31) TENN – Max Gilbert 36-yard field goal (Drive: 4 plays, 5 yards, 1:40; Tennessee 30–3)
- (04:02) TENN – Nico Iamaleava 31-yard run (Max Gilbert kick) (Drive: 3 plays, 34 yards, 0:43; Tennessee 37–3)
- (02:20) NCST – Aydan White 87-yard interception (Kanoah Vinesett kick) (Tennessee 37–10)

Fourth quarter

- (14:07) TENN – Dylan Sampson 34-yard run (Max Gilbert kick) (Drive: 5 plays, 60 yards, 3:13; Tennessee 44–10)
- (08:22) TENN – Holden Staes 18-yard pass from Nico Iamaleava (Max Gilbert kick) (Drive: 5 plays, 34 yards, 2:58; Tennessee 51–10)

Statistics	TENN	NCSU
First downs	22	10
Total yards	460	143
Rushing yards	249	39
Passing yards	211	104
Passing: Comp–Att–Int	16–23–2	15–22–1
Time of possession	31:28	28:32

Team	Category	Player	Statistics
Tennessee	Passing	Nico Iamaleava	16/23, 211 yards, 2 TD
Tennessee	Rushing	Dylan Sampson	20 carries, 138 yards, 2 TD
Tennessee	Receiving	Squirrel White	2 receptions, 67 yards
NC State	Passing	Grayson McCall	15/22, 104 yards
NC State	Rushing	Hollywood Smothers	6 carries, 31 yards
NC State	Receiving	Kevin "KC" Concepcion	5 receptions, 53 yards

=== vs. Kent State ===
Game Three – Kent State Golden Flashes (0–2) vs No. 7 Tennessee Volunteers (2–0)

Quarter	1	2	3	4	Total
Golden Flashes	0	0	0	0	0
No. 7 Volunteers	37	28	3	3	71

at Neyland Stadium • Knoxville, Tennessee

- Date: September 14, 2024
- Game time: 7:45 p.m.
- Game weather: Cloudy • Temperature: 80 °F (27 °C) • Wind: SE 9 miles per hour (14 km/h)
- Game attendance: 101,915
- Referee: David Smith
- TV announcers (SECN): Tom Hart (play-by-play), Jordan Rodgers (analyst), and Cole Cubelic (sideline)

Game information

First quarter

- (11:32) TEN – Dylan Sampson 22-yard run, Max Gilbert kick (Drive: 7 plays, 73 yards, 1:25; Tennessee 7–0)
- (10:35) TEN – 0-yard safety (Tennessee 9–0)
- (8:11) TEN – Dylan Sampson 1-yard run, Max Gilbert kick (Drive: 7 plays, 48 yards, 2:16; Tennessee 16–0)
- (5:56) TEN – Chris Brazzell II 53-yard pass from Nico Iamaleava, Max Gilbert kick (Drive: 3 plays, 51 yards, 0:33; Tennessee 23–0)
- (3:35) TEN – DeSean Bishop 53-yard run, Max Gilbert kick (Drive: 1 play, 53 yards, 0:11; Tennessee 30–0)
- (0:02) TEN – Dylan Sampson 1-yard run, Max Gilbert kick (Drive: 8 plays, 48 yards, 3:28; Tennessee 37–0)

Second quarter

- (13:06) TEN – DeSean Bishop 47-yard run, Max Gilbert kick (Drive: 4 plays, 56 yards, 1:03; Tennessee 44–0)
- (7:49) TEN – Dylan Sampson 14-yard run, Max Gilbert kick (Drive: 7 plays, 54 yards, 2:04; Tennessee 51–0)
- (3:06) TEN – Miles Kitselman 15-yard pass from Gaston Moore, Max Gilbert kick (Drive: 6 plays, 90 yards, 1:56; Tennessee 58–0)
- (0:19) TEN – Mike Matthews 18-yard pass from Gaston Moore, Max Gilbert kick (Drive: 6 plays, 48 yards, 1:20; Tennessee 65–0)

Third quarter

- (12:04) TEN – Max Gilbert 36-yard field goal (Drive: 9 plays, 58 yards, 2:56; Tennessee 68–0)

Fourth quarter

- (14:05) TEN – Max Gilbert 21-yard field goal (Drive: 12 plays, 79 yards, 6:59; Tennessee 71–0)

In a 71–0 win over Kent State, the Volunteers set a modern school record for points in a game.

Statistics	KENT	TENN
First downs	8	32
Total yards	112	740
Rushes/yards	54	456
Passing yards	58	284
Passing: Comp–Att–Int	9–16–0	16–25–0
Turnovers	0	0
Time of possession	28:15	31:45

Team	Category	Player	Statistics
Kent State	Passing	Devin Kargman	9/15, 58 yards
Kent State	Rushing	JD Sherrod	7 carries, 56 yards
Kent State	Receiving	Chrishon McCray	3 receptions, 27 yards
Tennessee	Passing	Nico Iamaleava; Gaston Moore	10/16, 173 yards, 1 TD; 4/4, 94 yards, 2 TD
Tennessee	Rushing	DeSean Bishop; Dylan Sampson	7 carries, 120 yards, 2 TD; 13 carries, 101 yards, 4 TD
Tennessee	Receiving	Dont'e Thornton Jr; Chris Brazzell; Mike Matthews	2 receptions, 64 yards 2 receptions, 63 yards, 1 TD; 2 receptions, 35 yards, 1 TD

=== at No. 15 Oklahoma ===
Game Four – No. 6 Tennessee Volunteers (3–0) vs No. 15 Oklahoma Sooners (3–0)

Quarter	1	2	3	4	Total
No. 6 Volunteers	10	9	3	3	25
No. 15 Sooners	3	0	0	12	15

at Gaylord Family Oklahoma Memorial Stadium • Norman, Oklahoma

- Date: September 21, 2024
- Game time: 7:30 p.m.
- Game weather: Sunny, 92 °F (33 °C)
- Game attendance: 84,701
- Referee: Matt Loeffler
- TV announcers (ABC): Chris Fowler (play-by-play), Kirk Herbstreit (analyst), and Holly Rowe (sideline)

Game information

First quarter

- (03:45) TENN – Max Gilbert 27-yard field goal (Drive: 6 plays, 42 yards, 2:36; Tennessee 3–0)
- (00:42) OKLA – Tyler Keltner 37-yard field goal (Drive: 10 plays, 55 yards, 3:12; Tied 3–3)
- (00:03) TENN – Dont'e Thornton Jr. 66-yard pass from Nico Iamaleava (Max Gilbert kick) (Drive: 2 plays, 75 yards, 2:36; Tennessee 10–3)

Second quarter

- (09:12) TENN – Jayson Jenkins safety (Tennessee 12–3)
- (01:40) TENN – Dylan Sampson 1-yard run (Max Gilbert kick) (Drive: 8 plays, 46 yards, 3:47; Tennessee 19–3)

Third quarter

- (06:03) TENN – Max Gilbert 41-yard field goal (Drive: 6 plays, 53 yards, 2:49; Tennessee 22–3)

Fourth quarter

- (08:25) OKLA – Jovantae Barnes 2-yard pass from Michael Hawkins Jr. (Tyler Keltner kick failed) (Drive: 10 plays, 68 yards, 3:30; Tennessee 22–9)
- (03:35) TENN – Max Gilbert 32-yard field goal (Drive: 4 plays, 9 yards, 1:40; Tennessee 25–9)
- (01:01) OKLA – Jovantae Barnes 1-yard run (Conversion failed) (Drive: 9 plays, 76 yards, 2:34; Tennessee 25–15)

Statistics	TENN	OKLA
First downs	14	16
Total yards	345	222
Rushes/yards	52/151	34/36
Passing yards	194	186
Passing: Comp–Att–Int	13–21–0	18–34–1
Turnovers	2	2
Time of possession	35:41	24:28

Team	Category	Player	Statistics
Tennessee	Passing	Nico Iamaleava	13/21, 194 yards, TD
Tennessee	Rushing	Dylan Sampson; DeSean Bishop	24 carries, 92 yards, TD; 16 carries, 65 yards
Tennessee	Receiving	Bru McCoy; Dont'e Thornton Jr.	4 receptions, 92 yards 2 receptions, 73 yards, TD
Oklahoma	Passing	Michael Hawkins Jr. Jackson Arnold	11/18, 132 yards, TD; 7/16, 54 yards
Oklahoma	Rushing	Michael Hawkins Jr. Jovantae Barnes	12 carries, 22 yards 8 carries, 12 yards, TD
Oklahoma	Receiving	Jaquaize Pettaway	3 receptions, 79 yards

=== at Arkansas ===
Game Five – No. 4 Tennessee Volunteers (4–0) vs Arkansas Razorbacks (3–2)

Quarter	1	2	3	4	Total
No. 4 Volunteers	0	0	14	0	14
Razorbacks	3	0	7	9	19

at Donald W. Reynolds Razorback Stadium • Fayetteville, Arkansas

- Date: October 5, 2024
- Game time: 7:30 p.m.
- Game attendance: 75,573
- Referee: Kyle Olson
- TV announcers (ABC): Chris Fowler (play-by-play), Kirk Herbstreit (analyst), and Holly Rowe (sideline)

Statistics	TENN	ARK
First downs	16	23
Total yards	332	431
Rushes/yards	36/174	44/134
Passing yards	158	297
Passing: Comp–Att–Int	17–29–0	21–30–0
Turnovers	0	0
Time of possession	24:31	35:29

Team	Category	Player	Statistics
Tennessee	Passing	Nico Iamaleava	17/29, 158 yards
Tennessee	Rushing	Dylan Sampson	22 carries, 138 yards, 2 TD
Tennessee	Receiving	Dont'e Thornton Jr.	1 reception, 42 yards
Arkansas	Passing	Taylen Green	19/27, 266 yards
Arkansas	Rushing	Braylen Russell	8 carries, 62 yards
Arkansas	Receiving	Andrew Armstrong	9 receptions, 132 yards

=== Vs. Florida (rivalry) ===
Game Six – Florida Gators (3–2) vs No. 8 Tennessee Volunteers (4–1)

Quarter	1	2	3	4	OT	Total
Gators	3	0	7	7	0	17
No. 8 Volunteers	0	0	10	7	6	23

at Neyland Stadium • Knoxville, Tennessee

- Date: October 12, 2024
- Game time: 7:00 p.m.
- Game weather: Temperature: 68 °F (20 °C) • Wind: W at 1 mile per hour (1.6 km/h) • Weather: Clear
- Game attendance: 101,915
- Referee: Wayne Winkler
- TV announcers (ESPN): Bob Wischusen (play-by-play), Louis Riddick (analyst), and Kris Budden (sideline)

Game information

First quarter

- Florida – Trey Smack 42-yard field goal, 3:15

Second quarter

No scoring plays

Third quarter

- Florida – Arlis Boardingham 13-yard pass from Graham Mertz (Trey Smack kick), 7:18
- Tennessee – Dylan Sampson 6-yard run (Max Gilbert kick), 2:57
- Tennessee – Max Gilbert 35-yard field goal, 1:37

Fourth quarter

- Tennessee – Dylan Sampson 23-yard run (Max Gilbert kick), 9:42
- Florida – Chimere Dike 27-yard pass from DJ Lagway (Trey Smack kick), 0:29

Overtime

- Tennessee – Dylan Sampson 1 yard run

Statistics	FLA	TENN
First downs	22	18
Total yards	72–361	69–312
Rushes/yards	40–138	43–143
Passing yards	223	169
Passing: Comp–Att–Int	20–32–1	16–26–1
Time of possession	34:56	25:04

Team	Category	Player	Statistics
Florida	Passing	Graham Mertz	11/15, 125 yards, TD
Florida	Rushing	Montrell Johnson Jr.	12 carries, 85 yards
Florida	Receiving	Chimere Dike	4 receptions, 76 yards, TD
Tennessee	Passing	Nico Iamaleava	16/26, 169 yards, INT
Tennessee	Rushing	Dylan Sampson	27 carries, 112 yards, 3 TD
Tennessee	Receiving	Squirrel White	5 receptions, 71 yards

=== Vs. No. 7 Alabama (Third Saturday in October) ===
Game Seven – No. 7 Alabama Crimson Tide (5–1) vs No. 11 Tennessee Volunteers (5–1)

Quarter	1	2	3	4	Total
No. 7 Crimson Tide	0	7	3	7	17
No. 11 Volunteers	0	0	14	10	24

at Neyland Stadium • Knoxville, Tennessee

- Date: October 19, 2024
- Game time: 3:30 p.m.
- Game weather: Sunny, 72 °F (22 °C)
- Game attendance: 101,915
- Referee: Ken Williamson
- TV announcers (ABC): Sean McDonough (play-by-play), Greg McElroy (analyst), and Molly McGrath (sideline)

Statistics	ALA	TENN
First downs	23	21
Total yards	314	408
Rushes/yards	34/75	43/214
Passing yards	239	194
Passing: Comp–Att–Int	25–45–2	14–28–2
Turnovers	2	3
Time of possession	33:15	26:45

Team	Category	Player	Statistics
Alabama	Passing	Jalen Milroe	25/45, 239 yards, TD, 2 INT
Alabama	Rushing	Jam Miller	12 carries, 42 yards
Alabama	Receiving	Ryan Coleman-Williams	8 receptions, 73 yards, TD
Tennessee	Passing	Nico Iamaleava	14/27, 194 yards, TD, INT
Tennessee	Rushing	Dylan Sampson	26 carries, 139 yards, 2 TD
Tennessee	Receiving	Bru McCoy	6 receptions, 80 yards

=== Vs. Kentucky (rivalry) ===
Game Eight – Kentucky Wildcats (3–5) vs No. 7 Tennessee Volunteers (6–1)

Quarter	1	2	3	4	Total
Wildcats	7	3	0	8	18
No. 7 Volunteers	0	7	14	7	28

at Neyland Stadium • Knoxville, Tennessee

- Date: November 2, 2024
- Game time: 7:45 p.m.
- Game weather: Clear, 62 °F (17 °C)
- Game attendance: 101,915
- Referee: Ken Williamson
- TV announcers (SECN): Tom Hart (play-by-play), Jordan Rodgers (analyst), and Cole Cubelic (sideline)

Statistics	UK	TENN
First downs	19	29
Total yards	360	477
Rushes/yards	37/168	44/185
Passing yards	192	292
Passing: Comp–Att–Int	14–27–2	28–38–0
Turnovers	3	1
Time of possession	30:32	29:28

Team	Category	Player	Statistics
Kentucky	Passing	Brock Vandagriff	10/17, 123 yards, TD, INT
Kentucky	Rushing	Jamarion Wilcox	17 carries, 102 yards
Kentucky	Receiving	Dane Key	2 receptions, 43 yards
Tennessee	Passing	Nico Iamaleava	28/38, 292 yards, TD
Tennessee	Rushing	Dylan Sampson	27 carries, 142 yards, 2 TD
Tennessee	Receiving	Miles Kitselman	6 receptions, 97 yards, TD

=== Vs. Mississippi State ===
Game Nine – Mississippi State Bulldogs (2–7) vs No. 7 Tennessee Volunteers (7–1)

Quarter	1	2	3	4	Total
Bulldogs	0	7	7	0	14
No. 7 Volunteers	7	13	10	3	33

at Neyland Stadium • Knoxville, Tennessee

- Date: November 9, 2024
- Game time: 7:00 p.m.
- Game weather: Cloudy • Temperature: 64 °F (18 °C) • Wind: E 3 miles per hour (4.8 km/h)
- Game attendance: 101,915
- Referee: Wayne Winkler
- TV announcers (ESPN): Dave Pasch (play-by-play), Dusty Dvoracek (analyst), and Taylor McGregor (sideline)

Game information

First quarter

- (11:44) TEN – Squirrel White 34-yard pass from Nico Iamaleava, Max Gilbert kick (Drive: 7 plays, 55 yards, 2:34; Tennessee 7–0)

Second quarter

- (13:35) TEN – Dont'e Thornton Jr. 73-yard pass from Nico Iamaleava, Max Gilbert kick (Drive: 1 play, 73 yards, 0:12; Tennessee 14–0)
- (5:47) MIS – Davon Booth 1-yard run, Kyle Ferrie kick (Drive: 16 plays, 75 yards, 7:48; Tennessee 14–7)
- (0:46) TEN – Max Gilbert 24-yard field goal (Drive: 15 plays, 64 yards, 4:53; Tennessee 17–7)
- (0:00) TEN – Max Gilbert 38-yard field goal (Drive: 3 plays, 26 yards, 0:14; Tennessee 20–7)

Third quarter

- (7:59) TEN – Max Gilbert 51-yard field goal (Drive: 6 plays, 32 yards, 3:09; Tennessee 23–7)
- (6:22) MIS – Johnnie Daniels 18-yard run, Kyle Ferrie kick (Drive: 4 plays, 65 yards, 1:37; Tennessee 23–14)
- (3:31) TEN – Dylan Sampson 33-yard run, Max Gilbert kick (Drive: 7 plays, 75 yards, 2:51; Tennessee 30–14)

Fourth quarter

- (8:14) TEN – Max Gilbert 38-yard field goal (Drive: 15 plays, 67 yards, 7:54; Tennessee 33–14)

Statistics	MSST	TENN
First downs	15	25
Total yards	271	452
Rushes/yards	38/179	57/240
Passing yards	92	212
Passing: Comp–Att–Int	10–26–1	13–21–0
Turnovers	2	1
Time of possession	25:42	34:18

Team	Category	Player	Statistics
Mississippi State	Passing	Michael Van Buren Jr.	10/26, 92 yards, INT
Mississippi State	Rushing	Davon Booth	20 carries, 125 yards, TD
Mississippi State	Receiving	Kevin Coleman Jr.	5 receptions, 68 yards
Tennessee	Passing	Nico Iamaleava	8/13, 174 yards, 2 TD
Tennessee	Rushing	Dylan Sampson	30 carries, 149 yards, TD
Tennessee	Receiving	Dont'e Thornton Jr.	3 receptions, 104 yards, TD

=== at No. 12 Georgia (rivalry) ===
Game Ten – No. 7 Tennessee Volunteers (8–1) vs No. 12 Georgia Bulldogs (7–2)

Quarter	1	2	3	4	Total
No. 7 Volunteers	10	7	0	0	17
No. 12 Bulldogs	0	17	7	7	31

at Sanford Stadium • Athens, Georgia

- Date: November 16, 2024
- Game time: 7:30 p.m.
- Game weather: Clear • Temperature: 55 °F (13 °C) • Wind: S 1 mile per hour (1.6 km/h)
- Game attendance: 93,033
- Referee: David Smith
- TV announcers (ABC): Chris Fowler (play-by-play), Kirk Herbstreit (analyst), Holly Rowe and Laura Rutledge (sideline)

Game information

First quarter

- (10:09) TEN – Miles Kitselman 1-yard run, Max Gilbert kick (Drive: 12 plays, 78 yards, 3:47; Tennessee 7–0)
- (0:43) TEN – Max Gilbert 52-yard field goal (Drive: 4 plays, 3 yards, 1:54; Tennessee 10–0)

Second quarter

- (13:30) UGA – Oscar Delp 19-yard pass from Carson Beck, Peyton Woodring kick (Drive: 7 plays, 75 yards, 2:13; Tennessee 10–7)
- (6:36) UGA – Oscar Delp 4-yard pass from Carson Beck, Peyton Woodring kick (Drive: 10 plays, 84 yards, 4:26; Georgia 14–10)
- (1:54) TEN – Dylan Sampson 27-yard run, Max Gilbert kick (Drive: 10 plays, 75 yards, 4:42; Tennessee 17–14)
- (0:05) UGA – Peyton Woodring 36-yard field goal (Drive: 11 plays, 57 yards, 1:49; Tied 17–17)

Third quarter

- (5:32) UGA – Carson Beck 10-yard run, Peyton Woodring kick (Drive: 12 plays, 87 yards, 7:22; Georgia 24–17)

Fourth quarter

- (2:26) UGA – Nate Frazier 2-yard run, Peyton Woodring kick (Drive: 12 plays, 92 yards, 6:21; Georgia 31–17)

Statistics	TENN	UGA
First downs	20	25
Total yards	319	453
Rushes/yards	39/152	31/106
Passing yards	167	347
Passing: Comp–Att–Int	20–33–0	25–40–0
Turnovers	1	0
Time of possession	29:31	30:29

Team	Category	Player	Statistics
Tennessee	Passing	Nico Iamaleava	20/33, 167 yards
Tennessee	Rushing	Dylan Sampson	19 carries, 101 yards, TD
Tennessee	Receiving	Miles Kitselman	4 receptions, 46 yards
Georgia	Passing	Carson Beck	25/40, 347 yards, 2 TD
Georgia	Rushing	Nate Frazier	19 carries, 68 yards, TD
Georgia	Receiving	London Humphreys	3 receptions, 63 yards

=== Vs. UTEP ===
Game Eleven – UTEP Miners (2–8) vs No. 11 Tennessee Volunteers (8–2)

Quarter	1	2	3	4	Total
Miners	0	0	0	0	0
No. 11 Volunteers	0	28	21	7	56

at Neyland Stadium • Knoxville, Tennessee

- Date: November 23, 2024
- Game time: 1:00 p.m.
- Game weather: Cloudy • Temperature: 47 °F (8 °C) • Wind: NW 3 miles per hour (4.8 km/h)
- Game attendance: 101,915
- Referee: Kyle Olson
- TV announcers (SECN+): Lowell Galindo (play-by-play), Fozzy Whittaker (analyst), and Marilyn Payne (sideline)

Game information

First quarter

No scoring plays

Second quarter

- (13:22) TEN – Dylan Sampson 14-yard run, Max Gilbert kick (Drive: 9 plays, 68 yards, 3:00; Tennessee 7–0)
- (7:33) TEN – Squirrel White 9-yard pass from Nico Iamaleava, Max Gilbert kick (Drive: 4 plays, 36 yards, 1:43; Tennessee 14–0)
- (2:19) TEN – Ethan Davis 1-yard pass from Nico Iamaleava, Max Gilbert kick (Drive: 2 plays, 19 yards, 0:21; Tennessee 21–0)
- (0:08) TEN – Bru McCoy 18-yard pass from Nico Iamaleava, Max Gilbert kick (Drive: 6 plays, 54 yards, 0:53; Tennessee 28–0)

Third quarter

- (13:32) TEN – Bru McCoy 7-yard pass from Nico Iamaleava, Max Gilbert kick (Drive: 4 plays, 67 yards, 1:23; Tennessee 35–0)
- (8:09) TEN – Peyton Lewis 3-yard run, Max Gilbert kick (Drive: 1 play, 3 yards, 0:04; Tennessee 42–0)
- (1:30) TEN – Peyton Lewis 6-yard run, Max Gilbert kick (Drive: 6 plays, 65 yards, 1:31; Tennessee 49–0)

Fourth quarter

- (8:24) TEN – Cameron Seldon 3-yard run, Max Gilbert kick (Drive: 11 plays, 44 yards, 5:17; Tennessee 56–0)

Statistics	UTEP	TENN
First downs	15	26
Total yards	230	460
Rushes/yards	38/81	39/241
Passing yards	149	219
Passing: Comp–Att–Int	21–36–2	18–29–0
Turnovers	3	0
Time of possession	33:49	26:11

Team	Category	Player	Statistics
UTEP	Passing	JP Pickles	10/15, 72 yards
UTEP	Rushing	Skyler Locklear	8 carries, 37 yards
UTEP	Receiving	Kenny Odom	8 receptions, 70 yards
Tennessee	Passing	Nico Iamaleava	17/23, 209 yards, 4 TD
Tennessee	Rushing	Dylan Sampson	11 carries, 77 yards, TD
Tennessee	Receiving	Bru McCoy	4 receptions, 37 yards, 2 TD

Running back Dylan Sampson set the program's single-season touchdown record (22) with a run and a catch, as well as points in a season (132).

=== at Vanderbilt (rivalry) ===
Game Twelve – No. 8 Tennessee Volunteers (9–2) vs Vanderbilt Commodores (6–5)

Quarter	1	2	3	4	Total
No. 8 Volunteers	7	17	9	3	36
Commodores	17	0	0	6	23

at FirstBank Stadium • Nashville, Tennessee

- Date: November 30, 2024
- Game time: 12:00 p.m.
- Game weather: Sunny • Temperature: 41 °F (5 °C) • Wind: SW 4 miles per hour (6.4 km/h)
- Game attendance: 28,934
- Referee: Jason Autrey
- TV announcers (ABC): Dave Pasch (play-by-play), Dusty Dvoracek (analyst), and Taylor McGregor (sideline reporter)

Game information
First quarter
- VAN – Junior Sherrill 100-yard kickoff return (Brock Taylor kick), 14:47. Commodores 7–0. Drive: 0 plays, 0 yards, 0:13.
- VAN – Sedrick Alexander 4-yard run (Brock Taylor kick), 10:22. Commodores 14–0. Drive: 7 plays, 26 yards, 3:52.
- TENN – Dont'e Thornton Jr. 28-yard pass from Nico Iamaleava (Max Gilbert kick), 8:48. Commodores 14–7. Drive: 5 plays, 73 yards, 1:34.
- VAN – Brock Taylor 32-yard field goal, 4:01. Commodores 17–7. Drive: 9 plays, 61 yards, 4:47.

Second quarter

- TENN – Max Gilbert 50-yard field goal, 8:33. Commodores 17–10. Drive: 6 plays, 21 yards, 2:59.
- TENN – Dont'e Thornton Jr. 86-yard pass from Nico Iamaleava (Max Gilbert kick), 6:38. Tied 17–17. Drive: 2 plays, 91 yards, 0:31.
- TENN – Miles Kitselman 18-yard pass from Nico Iamaleava (Max Gilbert kick), 0:22. Volunteers 24–17. Drive:10 plays, 96 yards, 2:19.

Third quarter

- TENN – Mike Matthews 14-yard pass from Nico Iamaleava (Max Gilbert kick), 8:43. Volunteers 31–17 Drive: 13 plays, 75 yards, 6:17.
- TENN – Tyre West Safety, 1:09. Volunteers 33–17. Drive: 2 plays, −4 yards, 0:49.

Fourth quarter

- TENN – Max Gilbert 22-yard field goal, 8:24. Volunteers 36–17. Drive: 13 plays, 46 yards, 7:46.
- VAN – Richie Hoskins 31-yard pass from Diego Pavia (No good on Two-Point conversion), 5:53. Volunteers 36–23. Drive: 4 plays, 63 yards, 2:23.

Statistics	TENN	VAN
First downs	28	15
Total yards	538	212
Rushes/yards	47/281	31/108
Passing yards	257	104
Passing: Comp–Att–Int	18–26–1	8–18–1
Turnovers	2	1
Time of possession	33:35	26:25

Team	Category	Player	Statistics
Tennessee	Passing	Nico Iamaleava	18/26, 257 yards, 4 TD, INT
Tennessee	Rushing	Dylan Sampson	25 carries, 178 yards
Tennessee	Receiving	Dont'e Thornton Jr.	3 receptions, 118 yards, 2 TD
Vanderbilt	Passing	Diego Pavia	8/17, 104 yards, TD, INT
Vanderbilt	Rushing	Sedrick Alexander	17 carries, 60 yards, TD
Vanderbilt	Receiving	Richie Hoskins	1 reception, 31 yards, TD

=== at No. 6 Ohio State (CFP First Round) ===
No. 7 Tennessee Volunteers (10–2) vs No. 6 Ohio State Buckeyes (10–2) – Game summary

Quarter	1	2	3	4	Total
No. 7 Volunteers	0	10	0	7	17
No. 6 Buckeyes	21	0	14	7	42

at Ohio Stadium • Columbus, Ohio

- Date: December 21
- Game time: 8:00 p.m. EST
- Game weather: • Clear, Temperature: 25 °F (−4 °C) • Wind: NW at 6 miles per hour (9.7 km/h)
- Game attendance: 102,819
- Referee: Jerry Magallanes
- TV announcers (ESPN/ABC): Chris Fowler (play-by-play), Kirk Herbstreit (analyst), Holly Rowe (sideline reporter), and Marty Smith (sideline reporter)

Game information

First quarter

- OSU – Jeremiah Smith 37-yard pass from Will Howard (Jayden Fielding kick), 12:46. Buckeyes 7–0. Drive: 5 plays, 75 yards, 2:14.
- OSU – Quinshon Judkins 1-yard run (Jayden Fielding kick), 8:09. Buckeyes 14–0. Drive: 5 plays, 68 yards, 2:39.
- OSU – TreVeyon Henderson 29-yard run (Jayden Fielding kick), 3:27. Buckeyes 21–0. Drive: 7 plays, 58 yards, 3:22.

Second quarter

- TENN – Max Gilbert 36-yard field goal, 12:46. Buckeyes 21–3. Drive: 9 plays, 62 yards, 3:23.
- TENN – Nico Iamaleava 2-yard run (Max Gilbert kick), 0:20. Buckeyes 21–10. Drive: 16 plays, 79 yards, 4:03.

Third quarter

- OSU – Jeremiah Smith 22-yard pass from Will Howard (Jayden Fielding kick), 9:16. Buckeyes 28–10. Drive: 6 plays, 65 yards, 3:14.
- OSU – Quinshon Judkins 1-yard run (Jayden Fielding kick), 1:18. Buckeyes 35–10. Drive: 9 plays, 81 yards, 4:46.

Fourth quarter

- OSU – TreVeyon Henderson 24-yard run (Jayden Fielding kick), 2:26. Buckeyes 42–10. Drive: 5 plays, 39 yards, 2:26.
- TENN – Nico Iamaleava 2-yard run (Max Gilbert kick), 1:56. Buckeyes 42–17. Drive: 9 plays, 73 yards, 3:19.

Statistics	TENN	OSU
First downs	17	24
Plays–yards	70–256	64–473
Rushes–yards	39–152	33–156
Passing yards	104	317
Passing: comp–att–int	14–31–0	25–31–1
Time of possession	27:10	32:50

Team	Category	Player	Statistics
Tennessee	Passing	Nico Iamaleava	14-31-104, 0 TD, 0 INT
Tennessee	Rushing	Peyton Lewis	77 yards, 10 carries, 7.7 avg.
Tennessee	Receiving	Bru McCoy	4 rec., 40 yards
Ohio State	Passing	Will Howard	24-29-311, 2 TD, 1 INT
Ohio State	Rushing	TreVeyon Henderson	80 yards, 10 carries, 2 TD
Ohio State	Receiving	Jeremiah Smith	6 rec., 103 yards, 2 TD

== Roster ==
2024 Tennessee Volunteers football team roster
Players
Coaches
Offense

Pos.	#	Name	Class
TE	0	Ethan Davis	Fr
WR	1	Dont'e Thornton Jr.	Sr
WR	3	Squirrel White	Jr
WR	5	Bru McCoy	Sr
RB	6	Dylan Sampson	Jr
QB	8	Nico Iamaleava	Fr
WR	10	Mike Matthews	Fr
WR	11	Chas Nimrod	So
QB	12	Jake Merklinger	Fr
QB	13	Gaston Moore	Sr
WR	14	Braylon Staley	Fr
QB	15	Ryan Damron	Fr
WR	17	Chris Brazzell II	So
RB	18	DeSean Bishop	Fr
TE	19	Holden Staes	Jr
RB	20	Khalifa Keith	So
QB	21	Navy Shuler	Sr
RB	23	Cameron Seldon	So
RB	24	Hunter Barnes	So
WR	26	Carson Whitehead	So
RB	27	Peyton Lewis	Fr
RB	28	Patrick Wilk	Jr
WR	29	Jack-Henry Jakobik	Fr
WR	30	Tommy Winton III	So
WR	31	Jackson Locke	Jr
WR	36	Nathan Roberts	Fr
WR	39	Malcolm Kinzer	Fr
WR	42	Braylon Harmon	Fr
TE	44	Luke Shouse	Sr
OL	50	William Satterwhite	Fr
OL	53	Lance Heard	So
OL	54	Vysen Lang	Fr
OL	59	Masai Reddick	So
OL	60	Jeremias Heard	Fr
OL	63	Cooper Mays	Sr
OL	64	Ayden Bussell	Fr
OL	65	Trevor Duncan	Fr
OL	66	Dayne Davis	Sr
OL	68	Bennett Warren	Fr
OL	69	Gus Hill	So
OL	70	Andrej Karic	Sr
OL	71	Max Anderson	Fr
OL	72	Jesse Perry	Fr
OL	73	Brian Grant	So
OL	74	John Campbell Jr.	Sr
OL	75	Jackson Lampley	Sr
OL	76	Javontez Spraggins	Sr
OL	77	Larry Johnson III	So
OL	78	Gage Ginther	Fr
OL	79	Shamurad Umarov	Fr
WR	80	Nate Spillman	Fr
WR	82	Dayton Sneed	Fr
WR	83	Trey Weary	So
WR	84	Kaleb Webb	So
WR	85	Nathan Leacock	Fr
TE	86	Cole Harrison	Fr
TE	87	Miles Kitselman	Sr
TE	88	Charlie Browder	Jr
TE	89	Titus Rohrer	So

Defense

Pos.	#	Name	Class
DB	0	William Wright	Sr
DB	1	Rickey Gibson III	So
DB	2	Andre Turrentine	Jr
DB	3	Jermod McCoy	So
DB	4	Jourdan Thomas	Jr
DB	5	Christian Harrison	Jr
DB	6	Jalen McMurray	Jr
LB	7	Arion Carter	So
LB	8	Kalib Perry	Jr
DB	9	Jakobe Thomas	Jr
DL	10	Elijah Simmons	Sr
LB	11	Keenan Pili	Sr
DB	12	John Slaughter	So
LB	13	Edwin Spillman	Fr
DB	14	Christian Charles	Jr
DB	15	Edrees Farooq	Fr
DL	18	Tyree Weathersby	Fr
DL	19	Joshua Josephs	Jr
DL	20	Bryson Eason	Sr
DL	21	Omari Thomas	Sr
LB	22	Jeremiah Telander	So
DB	23	Boo Carter	Fr
DB	24	Jordan Matthews	Fr
DB	25	Kaleb Beasley	Fr
DE	27	James Pearce Jr.	Jr
DB	28	Marcus Goree Jr.	Fr
DL	29	Jordan Ross	Fr
DL	30	Jamal Wallace	Jr
DL	31	Caleb Herring	So
LB	33	Ben Bolton	So
DB	35	Will Brooks	Sr
DB	37	Montrell Bandy	Jr
DB	38	Andre Stewart	So
LB	39	Jalen Smith	Fr
LB	40	Colin Brazzell	Fr
DL	42	Tyre West	Jr
DB	43	Jackson Mathews	Fr
DB	44	Steele Katina	Fr
LB	46	Cody Duncan	Jr
LB	50	Ryan Scott	Fr
DL	51	Jaxson Moi	Jr
LB	52	Eli Purcell	Sr
DL	53	Daevin Hobbs	So
LB	54	Jordan Burns	Fr
DL	55	Omarr Norman-Lott	Sr
DL	56	Kellen Lindstrom	Fr
LB	57	Grier Short	Fr
DL	58	Herb Gray	Fr
DL	59	Tim Amet	Jr
DL	87	Joshua Helsdon	So
DL	89	Mike Bethea	Jr
DL	90	Dominic Bailey	Sr
DL	94	Nathan Robinson	Fr
DL	95	Carson Gentle	Fr
DL	96	Isaiah Inge	Fr
DL	97	Jayson Jenkins	So
DL	98	Emmanuel Okoye	Fr

Special teams

Pos.	#	Name	Class
PK	41	JT Carver	Jr
LS	47	Matthew Salansky	Sr
LS	48	Bennett Brady	So
LS	58	Marshall Box	Fr
PK	90	Max Gilbert	Fr
P/PK	94	Josh Turbyville	So
P	98	Jackson Ross	So

Head coach

- Josh Heupel

Coordinators/assistant coaches

- Joey Halzle – Offensive coordinator/Quarterbacks
- Tim Banks – Defensive coordinator
- Mike Ekeler – Special teams coordinator/Outside linebackers
- Alec Abeln – Tight ends
- Glen Elarbee – Offensive line
- Rodney Garner – Defensive line
- William Inge – Linebackers
- Willie Martinez – Secondary
- Kelsey Pope – Wide receivers
- De'Rail Sims – Running backs
- Max Thurmond – Senior offensive analyst

Legend

- (C) Team captain
- (S) Suspended
- (I) Ineligible
- Injured
- Redshirt

Roster

== Players drafted into the NFL ==
Tennessee had four players selected in the 2025 NFL draft.

Round	Pick	Player	Position	NFL club
1	26	James Pearce Jr.	DE	Atlanta Falcons
2	63	Omarr Norman-Lott	DT	Kansas City Chiefs
4	108	Dont'e Thornton	WR	Las Vegas Raiders
4	126	Dylan Sampson	RB	Cleveland Browns
