= DeSean Bishop =

American football player (born 2004)

No. 18 – Tennessee Volunteers
- Position: Running back
- Class: Redshirt Junior

Personal information
- Born: October 15, 2004 (age 22)
- Listed height: 5 ft 10 in (1.78 m)
- Listed weight: 210 lb (95 kg)

Career information
- High school: Karns (Knoxville, Tennessee)
- College: Tennessee (2023–present)

Awards and highlights
- Second-team All-SEC (2025)
- Stats at ESPN

DeSean Bishop (born October 15, 2004) is an American college football running back for the Tennessee Volunteers.

== Early life ==
Bishop played running back for Karns High School where he recorded 8,347 rushing yards and 102 rushing touchdowns. On July 14, 2022, Bishop committed to continue his playing career at Coastal Carolina, but decommitted after head coach Jamey Chadwell was hired by Liberty. On December 21, 2022, Bishop decided to join the Tennessee Volunteers as a preferred walk-on.

== College career ==
During his true freshman year, Bishop did not play in any games and took a redshirt after suffering an injury during the preseason.

During the 2024 season, Bishop served as the second-string running back behind All-SEC selection Dylan Sampson. Despite facing injuries in the later weeks of the season, Bishop was able to accumulate 455 yards and three touchdowns on 74 carries.

In January 2025, Bishop was given a football scholarship. He finished the 2025 season with 182 carries for 1,076 rushing yards and 16 rushing touchdowns.

=== Statistics ===
Season	Games		Rushing				Receiving			
Season	GP	GS	Att	Yds	Avg	TD	Rec	Yds	Avg	TD
2023	0	0	(redshirt) Redshirted							
2024	10	0	74	455	6.1	3	1	10	10.0	0
2025	13	13	182	1,076	5.9	16	15	135	9.0	0
Career	23	13	256	1,531	6.0	19	16	145	9.1	0

== Personal life ==
Bishop is the son of Sherika Freeman.
