= 2027 UFL draft =

American football events to select players

General information
- Date: November 18-19, 2026
- Location: Ballpark Village; St. Louis, Missouri
- Networks: NFL Network (Rounds 1-2); YouTube (Rounds 3-15)

Overview
- 115 total selections in 15 rounds
- League: United Football League
- First selection: Diego Pavia, QB, Columbus Aviators
- Mr. Irrelevant: Jalen McMurray, CB, DC Defenders
- Most selections (18): Rhode Island Breakers
- Fewest selections (12): DC Defenders & Louisville Kings

The 2027 UFL draft was a selection of rookies eligible for the 2027 NFL draft, as well as players from the 2023–2026 NFL drafts prior to the 2027 UFL season.

== History ==
The 2027 draft was the UFL's first entry draft since the 2024 UFL college draft, which had largely been seen as a failure due to a high rate of draftees refusing to sign for the 2025 UFL season. Plans to hold an entry draft during the 2025–26 offseason were eventually abandoned upon the arrival of co-owner Mike Repole, who unexpectedly used the 2026 UFL draft to liquidate and re-disperse the majority of all eight UFL teams' rosters. It is only the third supplemental draft in the modern spring football era, following the 2024 college draft and the 2023 USFL draft.

This was also be the first time the UFL streamed a draft and the first time a spring football draft was televised.

== Structure ==
The draft consisted of 15 total rounds. The first two rounds were televised on NFL Network on November 18; the remaining rounds were livestreamed the following morning. The selection order is determined by the reverse of the 2026 UFL standings, using a formula similar to that of the NFL draft. The Columbus Aviators hold the first overall pick in the draft, by virtue of finishing last in the UFL standings in 2026. (Note: In the two previous supplemental drafts, a team had to win its Week 10 game in the previous season to earn the first overall selection, since in both years, the two teams in last and penultimate place were coincidentally scheduled against each other for their final games; this did not happen in 2026, so this rule was not invoked.) Each team had three minutes to make each of their selections during the televised portion of the draft. Teams can select players at any position, pass on a single round selection, or opt out of the draft at any point. Trades are only allowed for current UFL players or picks in this year’s draft; as plans for future drafts have not been finalized, teams will not be able to trade hypothetical draft selections in future years.

The Colorado Stampede, Dallas Renegades, and Rhode Island Breakers rotated their draft position based on tie-breakers; Dallas had finished the 2026 season tied with both teams that had been contracted (the Birmingham Stallions and Houston Gamblers), and a series of offseason maneuvers led to Dallas receiving the Gamblers' coaches and players, Colorado receiving the Renegades' and Rhode Island the Stallions'.

The 2027 UFL draft pool included rookies eligible for the 2026 NFL draft, as well as players from 2023–2025 NFL draft eligible classes who have been on an NFL roster at any point since the United Bowl Championship Game.

Unlike in the 2026 draft, no territorial allocation is included in the draft structure.

In preparation for the draft, each team was required to reduce their roster to a maximum of 35 players. Any players that had signed with a NFL team following the 2026 season or who had been signed to the team following a UFL showcase were exempt from this rule. Following the draft, teams are able to expand their rosters toward a 64-player maximum for UFL preseason training camp.

== Top prospects ==
In November, the UFL announced a list of the top draft-eligible players at each position.

Offense
Position	Player	College
QB	Connor Bazelak	Bowling Green
QB	Carter Bradley	South Alabama
QB	Jacob Clark	Missouri State
QB	Diego Pavia	Vanderbilt
QB	Blake Shapen	Mississippi State
RB	Miles Davis	Utah State
RB	Jamal Haynes	Georgia Tech
RB	Jordan Mims	Fresno State
RB	Carson Steele	UCLA
WR	Tru Edwards	Louisiana Tech
WR	Kyron Hudson	Penn State
WR	Tyler Scott	Cincinnati
WR	Xavier Weaver	Colorado
TE	Jaheim Bell	Florida State
TE	Rivaldo Fairweather	Auburn
TE	Luke Lachey	Iowa
TE	Tanner McLachlan	Arizona
OL	Malaesala Aumavae–Laulu	Oregon
OL	Karsen Barnhart	Michigan
OL	Nick Broeker	Ole Miss
OL	Izavion Miller	Auburn
OL	Dalton Wagner	Arkansas

Defense
Position	Player	College
DL	Treven Ma'ae	Baylor
DL	Brodric Martin	Western Kentucky
DL	Uso Seumalo	Kansas State
DL	J. R. Singleton	Iowa State
DL	Keveion'Ta Spears	SMU
EDGE	Jahfari Harvey	SMU
EDGE	Jared Ivey	Ole Miss
EDGE	Jamil Muhammad	USC
EDGE	Xavier Thomas	Clemson
LB	Nikhai Hill-Green	Alabama
LB	Owen Pappoe	Auburn
LB	Chris Paul Jr.	Ole Miss
LB	Jacob Roberts	Wake Forest
LB	Xavian Sorey	Arkansas
CB	Jaylon Guilbeau	Texas
CB	Jalen Kimber	Penn State
CB	Jeremiah McClendon	Southern Illinois
CB	Matthew McDoom	Cincinnati
CB	Daryl Porter Jr.	Miami (FL)
S	Daijahn Anthony	Ole Miss
S	Devan Boykin	Indiana
S	Devin Grant	Syracuse
S	Jack Henderson	Minnesota
S	Patrick McMorris	California

== Player selections ==
Rnd	Pick No.	Team	Player	Pos.	College	Notes
1	1	Columbus Aviators	Diego Pavia	QB	Vanderbilt	
1	2	Colorado Stampede	Xavier Thomas	EDGE	Clemson	
1	3	Rhode Island Breakers	Jahfari Harvey	EDGE	SMU	
1	4	Dallas Renegades	Jalen Kimber	DB	Penn State	
1	5	St. Louis Battlehawks	Isaiah Jatta	OT	BYU	
1	6	Orlando Storm	Ricky Lee	OT	North Carolina A&T	
1	7	DC Defenders	Aamil Wagner	OT	Notre Dame	
1	8	Louisville Kings	Dalton Wagner	OT	Arkansas	
2	9	Columbus Aviators	Tru Edwards	WR	Louisiana Tech	
2	10	Rhode Island Breakers	Jeremiah Byers	OT	Florida State	
2	11	Dallas Renegades	Marvin Jones Jr.	EDGE	Oklahoma	
2	12	Colorado Stampede	Latrell McCutchin	CB	Houston	
2	13	St. Louis Battlehawks	Derrick Graham	OT	Tulane	
2	14	Orlando Storm	Jalan Gaines	EDGE	Illinois State	
2	15	DC Defenders	Malik Cunningham	QB	Louisville	
2	16	Louisville Kings	Corey Robinson II	OT	Arkansas	
3	17	Columbus Aviators	Jamil Muhammad	EDGE	Southern California	
3	18	Dallas Renegades	Chris Paul Jr.	ILB	Mississippi	
3	19	Colorado Stampede	Nikhai Hill-Green	ILB	Alabama	
3	20	Rhode Island Breakers	Caleb Etienne	OT	BYU	
3	21	St. Louis Battlehawks	Justin Wodtly	DT	Arizona State	
3	22	Orlando Storm	Jacob Roberts	ILB	Wake Forest	
3	23	Rhode Island Breakers	Cornelius Johnson	WR	Michigan	from DC (Note: No. 23: DC → Rhode Island (D). DC traded third-, fourth, and sixth-round selections (23rd, 31st, and 47th overall) to Rhode Island in exchange for CB Mario Goodrich.)
3	24	Louisville Kings	Dan Jackson	S	Georgia	
4	25	Columbus Aviators	Carter Warren	OT	Pittsburgh	
4	26	Colorado Stampede	Hollin Pierce	G	Rutgers	
4	27	Rhode Island Breakers	Dontae Manning	CB	Oregon	
4	28	Dallas Renegades	Eric Scott	CB	Southern Mississippi	
4	29	St. Louis Battlehawks	Beanie Bishop	CB	West Virginia	
4	30	Orlando Storm	Marcus Allen	CB	North Carolina	
4	31	Rhode Island Breakers	Jeremiah Martin	EDGE	Washington	from DC (Note: No. 31: DC → Rhode Island (D). See Round 3: DC → Rhode Island.)
4	32	Louisville Kings	Tre Hawkins III	CB	Old Dominion	
5	33	Columbus Aviators	Jaheim Bell	TE	Florida State	
5	34	Rhode Island Breakers	Tanner McLachlan	TE	Arizona	
5	35	Dallas Renegades	Jerome Carvin	G	Tennessee	
5	36	Colorado Stampede	Nate Evans	CB	Delaware	
5	37	St. Louis Battlehawks	Matthew McDoom	CB	Cincinnati	
5	38	Orlando Storm	Brodric Martin	NT	Western Kentucky	
5	39	DC Defenders	Keveion'Ta Spears	DT	SMU	
5	40	Louisville Kings	McCallan Castles	TE	Tennessee	
6	41	Columbus Aviators	Eric Gentry	ILB	Southern California	
6	42	Dallas Renegades	Jack Henderson	S	Minnesota	
6	43	Colorado Stampede	Izavion Miller	G	Auburn	
6	44	Rhode Island Breakers	Wyatt Bowles	G	Utah State	
6	45	St. Louis Battlehawks	Antwaun Powell-Ryland	EDGE	Virginia Tech	
6	46	Orlando Storm	J.R. Singleton	DL	Iowa State	
6	47	Rhode Island Breakers	Dominic Bailey	EDGE	Tennessee	from DC (Note: No. 47: DC → Rhode Island (D). See Round 3: DC → Rhode Island.)
6	48	Louisville Kings	Vershon Lee	C	South Carolina	
7	49	Columbus Aviators	Miles Davis	RB	Utah State	
7	50	Colorado Stampede	Xavian Sorey	ILB	Arkansas	
7	51	Rhode Island Breakers	Brandon Crossley	CB	SMU	
7	52	Dallas Renegades	Dalys Beanum	CB	South Dakota State	
7	53	St. Louis Battlehawks	Jeremiah McClendon	CB	Southern Illinois	
7	54	Orlando Storm	Larry Worth III	ILB	Arkansas	
7	55	DC Defenders	Mason Pline	TE	Furman	
7	56	Louisville Kings	Tyron Herring	CB	Delaware	
8	57	Columbus Aviators	Vincent Anthony Jr.	EDGE	Duke	
8	58	Rhode Island Breakers	A.T. Perry	WR	Wake Forest	
8	59	Dallas Renegades	Shiyazh Pete	G	Kentucky	
8	60	Colorado Stampede	Damien Martinez	RB	Miami (FL)	
8	61	St. Louis Battlehawks	Chris Edmonds	S	Arizona State	
8	62	Orlando Storm	Mehki Butler	G	Arkansas State	
8	63	DC Defenders	Miles Battle	CB	Utah	
8	64	Louisville Kings	Nate Valcarcel	S	Northern Illinois	
9	65	Columbus Aviators	Luke Floriea	WR	Kent State	
9	66	Dallas Renegades	E.J. Horton	WR	Purdue	
9	67	Colorado Stampede	Dae'Quan Wright	TE	Mississippi	
9	68	Rhode Island Breakers	Tyreak Sapp	DL	Florida	
9	69	St. Louis Battlehawks	Micah Davis	WR	Southern Mississippi	
9	70	Orlando Storm	Cam'Ron Stewart	EDGE	Temple	
9	71	DC Defenders	Tristan Leigh	OT	Clemson	
9	72	Louisville Kings	Christian Fitzpatrick	WR	Oklahoma State	
10	73	Columbus Aviators	Tomas Rimac	G	Virginia Tech	
10	74	Colorado Stampede	Xavier Weaver	WR	Colorado	
10	75	Rhode Island Breakers	Dwight McGlothern	CB	Arkansas	
10	76	Dallas Renegades	Randy Bond	K	Texas A&M	
10	77	St. Louis Battlehawks	Treven Ma'ae	DL	Baylor	
10	78	Orlando Storm	Marques Cox	G	Northern Illinois	
10	79	DC Defenders	Raylen Sharpe	WR	Arkansas	
10	80	Louisville Kings	Fred Farrier II	WR	Kentucky	
11	81	Columbus Aviators	Josh Kreutz	C	Illinois	
11	82	Rhode Island Breakers	Bayron Matos	G	South Florida	
11	83	Dallas Renegades	M.J. Devonshire	CB	Pittsburgh	
11	84	Colorado Stampede	Brenden Rice	WR	Southern California	
11	85	St. Louis Battlehawks	Caleb Offord	CB	Kennesaw State	
11	86	Orlando Storm	Eric Rogers	CB	Rutgers	
11	87	DC Defenders	Devin Grant	S	Syracuse	
11	88	Louisville Kings	Sam Adams III	RB	Sacramento State	
12	89	Columbus Aviators	Devan Boykin	S	Indiana	
12	90	Dallas Renegades	Jack Stonehouse	P	Syracuse	
12	91	Colorado Stampede	Bruno Fina	C	Duke	
12	92	Rhode Island Breakers	Xavier Johnson	WR	Ohio State	
12	93	St. Louis Battlehawks	Jim Bonifas	C	Iowa State	
12	94	Orlando Storm	Eric Butler II	S	San Diego State	
12	95	DC Defenders	Dante Miller	RB	South Carolina	
12	96	Louisville Kings	DJ Wingfield	G	Southern California	
13	97	Columbus Aviators	Bryson Nesbit	TE	North Carolina	
13	98	Colorado Stampede	Stephen Hall	CB	Missouri	
13	99	Rhode Island Breakers	Zy Crisler	OL	Colorado	
13	100	Dallas Renegades	Kyron Drones	RB	Virginia Tech	
13	101	St. Louis Battlehawks	E.J. Warner	QB	Fresno State	
13	102	Orlando Storm	Tamon Lynum	CB	Pittsburgh	
13	103	DC Defenders	Bryce Robinson	LS	Virginia	
13	104	Louisville Kings	Passed			
14	105	Columbus Aviators	Keelan Marion	WR	Miami (FL)	
14	106	Rhode Island Breakers	Blake Shapen	QB	Mississippi State	
14	107	Dallas Renegades	William Haskell	WR	Portland State	
14	108	Colorado Stampede	Roydell WIlliams	RB	Florida State	
14	109	St. Louis Battlehawks	Passed			
14	110	Orlando Storm	Fatorma Mulbah	DT	West Virginia	
14	111	DC Defenders	Devin Bale	P	Arkansas	
14	112	Louisville Kings	Passed			
15	113	Columbus Aviators	Christian Thomas	ILB	Maine	
15	114	Dallas Renegades	Heinrich Haarberg	TE	Nebraska	
15	115	Colorado Stampede	Isaiah Smith	EDGE	SMU	
15	116	Rhode Island Breakers	Jarquez Hunter	RB	Auburn	
15	117	St. Louis Battlehawks	Passed			
15	118	Orlando Storm	Nick Nash	WR	San Jose State	
15	119	DC Defenders	Jalen McMurray	CB	Tennessee	
15	120	Louisville Kings	Passed			

== Trades involving draft picks ==
In the explanations below (PD) indicates trades completed prior to the start of the draft, while (D) denotes trades that take place during the 2026 draft.
