= 2026 Senior Bowl =

American college football all-star game

2026 Panini Senior Bowl
- 77th Senior Bowl
| National Team | American Team |
| 9 | 17 |
| Head coach: Clint Hurtt (Philadelphia Eagles) | Head coach: Joel Thomas (New Orleans Saints) |
| | 1 | 2 | 3 | 4 | Total |
|---|---|---|---|---|---|
| National | 0 | 0 | 0 | 9 | 9 |
| American | 14 | 3 | 0 | 0 | 17 |
- Date: January 31, 2026
- Season: 2025
- Stadium: Hancock Whitney Stadium
- Location: Mobile, Alabama
- MVP: Garrett Nussmeier (QB, LSU)

United States TV coverage
- Network: NFL Network

The 2026 Senior Bowl was a college football all-star game played on January 31, 2026, at Hancock Whitney Stadium in Mobile, Alabama. The game featured prospects for the National Football League (NFL)'s 2026 NFL draft, predominantly from the NCAA Division I Football Bowl Subdivision (FBS). It was one of the 2025–26 bowl games concluding the 2025 FBS football season. The game began at 1:30 p.m. Central Time and was officially known as the Panini Senior Bowl via sponsorship from Panini America. Television coverage was provided by NFL Network. The full roster for the game was announced on January 14, 2026. The National Team was coached by Philadelphia Eagles assistant coach Clint Hurtt, and the American Team was coached by New Orleans Saints assistant coach Joel Thomas. The American Team defeated the National Team, 17–9. Garrett Nussmeier was named the game's most valuable player.

== Players ==
Roster source:
Box score:

=== National team ===
| No. | Player | Position | HT/WT | College | Notes |
|---|---|---|---|---|---|
| 13 | Kaytron Allen | RB | 5'11"/220 | Penn State | |
| 8 | Vinny Anthony II | WR | 5'11"/185 | Wisconsin | |
| 7 | Vincent Anthony Jr. | DE | 6'5"/246 | Duke | 2 tackles (2 solo, 1 TFL), 1 sack, 1 forced fumble |
| 43 | Luke Basso | LS | 6'3"/236 | Oregon | |
| 87 | Nate Boerkircher | TE | | Texas A&M | |
| 28 | Bryce Boettcher | LB | 6'0"/227 | Oregon | 10 tackles (4 solo), 1 pass breakup |
| 3 | Romello Brinson | WR | | SMU | |
| 34 | Josh Cameron | WR | 6'1"/223 | Baylor | 2 rec, 13 yds |
| 21 | Bud Clark | SAF | 6'1"/185 | TCU | 3 tackles (2 solo) |
| 78 | Dametrious Crownover | OL | 6'6"/331 | Texas A&M | |
| 1 | Charles Demmings | CB | 6'1"/191 | Stephen F. Austin | 2 tackles (1 solo) |
| 33 | Dani Dennis-Sutton | DE | 6'5"/268 | Penn State | |
| 1 | Thaddeus Dixon | DB | 6'0"/194 | North Carolina | 2 tackles (1 solo) |
| 5 | Caleb Douglas | WR | 6'3"/198 | Texas Tech | |
| 67 | Gennings Dunker | OL | 6'4"/320 | Iowa | |
| 28 | Zane Durant | DT | 6'0"/290 | Penn State | |
| 20 | Bryson Eason | DT | 6'2"/316 | Tennessee | |
| 91 | Deven Eastern | DT | 6'5"/301 | Minnesota | |
| 96 | Ryan Eckley | P | 6'0"/199 | Michigan State | |
| 3 | Kaleb Elarms-Orr | LB | 6'1"/233 | TCU | 5 tackles |
| 0 | Logan Fano | DE | 6'4"/258 | Utah | |
| 52 | Jalen Farmer | OL | 6'4"/322 | Kentucky | |
| 2 | TJ Hall | CB | 6'0"/188 | Iowa | 2 tackles |
| 56 | Gracen Halton | DT | 6'2"/293 | Oklahoma | |
| 50 | Dayon Hayes | DE | | Texas A&M | |
| 75 | Sam Hecht | OL | 6'4"/297 | Kansas State | |
| 9 | Romello Height | DE | 6'2"/234 | Texas Tech | |
| 71 | Alan Herron | OL | 6'4"/321 | Maryland | |
| 88 | Matthew Hibner | TE | | SMU | 1 rec, 17 yds |
| 3 | Chris Hilton Jr. | WR | | LSU | 1 rec, 8 yds |
| 8 | Colton Hood | CB | 5'11"/188 | Tennessee | |
| 2 | Jordan Hudson | WR | 6'0"/198 | SMU | 2 rec, 17 yds |
| 2 | Lee Hunter | DT | 6'3"/320 | Texas Tech | |
| 6 | Darrell Jackson Jr. | DL | | Florida State | |
| 1 | Chris Johnson | CB | 6'0"/190 | San Diego State | 1 tackle |
| 7 | Justin Joly | TE | 6'3"/251 | NC State | 1 rec, 18 yds |
| 90 | Rene Konga | DL | | Louisville | 1 tackle |
| 9 | Tanner Koziol | TE | 6'6"/245 | Houston | |
| 5 | Caullin Lacy | WR | 5'8"/189 | Louisville | 1 rec, 22 yds; 1 tackle (1 solo) |
| 74 | Delby Lemieux | OL | 6'5"/305 | Dartmouth | |
| 48 | Max Llewellyn | DE | 6'5"/255 | Iowa | 2 tackles (1 solo), 1 pass breakup |
| 9 | Kyle Louis | LB | 5'11"/224 | Pittsburgh | |
| 6 | Jeffrey M'Ba | DT | 6'5"/316 | SMU | |
| 5 | Hezekiah Masses | CB | 6'0"/180 | California | 4 tackles |
| 1 | Donaven McCulley | WR | | Michigan | 4 rec, 50 yds |
| 3 | Seth McGowan | RB | 5'11"/215 | Kentucky | 1 rec, 7 yds; 4 rush, 35 yds |
| 6 | Jalen McMurray | CB | 5'10"/179 | Tennessee | |
| 4 | Tyren Montgomery | WR | 5'11"/190 | John Carroll | |
| 5 | Kejon Owens | RB | | FIU | 1 rec, 3 yds; 7 rush, 20 yds, 1 TD |
| 2 | Diego Pavia | QB | 5'9"/198 | Vanderbilt | 10/13 passing, 78 yds; 4 rush, -12 yds; 1 tackle (1 solo, 1 TFL), 1 forced fumble |
| 7 | VJ Payne | SAF | 6'3"/210 | Kansas State | 1 tackle |
| 9 | Cole Payton | QB | 6'2"/229 | North Dakota State | 5/10 passing, 72 yds; 5 rush, 22 yds |
| 58 | Melvin Priestly | OL | | Illinois | |
| 34 | TJ Quinn | LB | | Louisville | 5 tackles (1 solo) |
| 0 | Chandler Rivers | CB | 5'9"/185 | Duke | 3 tackles (2 solo) |
| 13 | Sawyer Robertson | QB | 6'3"/221 | Baylor | 1/5 passing, 17 yds; 1 rush, 8 yds |
| 10 | Jacob Rodriguez | LB | 6'1"/233 | Texas Tech | |
| 0 | DJ Rogers | TE | 6'3"/242 | TCU | |
| 77 | Keylan Rutledge | OL | 6'3"/316 | Georgia Tech | |
| 94 | Tyreak Sapp | DL | | Florida | |
| 8 | DeShon Singleton | SAF | 6'2"/212 | Nebraska | 4 tackles (1 solo), 1 INT |
| 10 | Nick Singleton | RB | 6/0"/221 | Penn State | |
| 8 | Cian Slone | DE | 6'3"/239 | NC State | 2 tackles (1 solo, 1 TFL), 1 sack |
| 70 | Beau Stephens | OL | 6'5"/310 | Iowa | |
| 18 | Drew Stevens | K | 6'1"/221 | Iowa | |
| 3 | J'Mari Taylor | RB | 5'9"/205 | Virginia | 3 rush, 41 yds |
| 9 | Star Thomas | RB | | Tennessee | 2 rec, 12 yds; 1 rush, -1 yds; 2 tackles (1 solo) |
| 11 | Nadame Tucker | OLB | | Western Michigan | 5 tackles (4 solo, 3 TFL), 2 sack, 1 forced fumble |
| 1 | Reggie Virgil | WR | 6'2"/188 | Texas Tech | |
| 2 | Harrison Wallace III | WR | 5'11"/194 | Ole Miss | |
| 42 | Tyre West | DL | | Tennessee | |
| 6 | Zakee Wheatley | SAF | 6'2"/201 | Penn State | |
| 0 | Scooby Williams | LB | 6'2"/217 | Texas A&M | |
| 16 | Wydett Williams | SAF | | Ole Miss | |
| 50 | Carver Willis | OL | 6'4"/305 | Washington | |
| 60 | Trey Zuhn III | OL | 6'6"/309 | Texas A&M | |

=== American team ===
| No. | Player | Position | HT/WT | College | Notes |
|---|---|---|---|---|---|
| 4 | Cyrus Allen | WR | 5'11"/180 | Cincinnati | 1 rec, 9 yds |
| 9 | Luke Altmyer | QB | 6'1"/210 | Illinois | 5/8 passing, 21 yds; 3 rush, -13 yds |
| 1 | Aaron Anderson | WR | 5'7"/177 | LSU | 1 rec, 19 yds |
| 5 | Cameron Ball | DT | 6'3"/313 | Arkansas | |
| 88 | Caleb Banks | DT | | Florida | 1 tackle (0.5 TFL), 0.5 sack |
| 58 | Austin Barber | OL | 6'6"/318 | Florida | |
| 93 | Nick Barrett | DT | 6'3"/315 | South Carolina | 1 tackle |
| 70 | Markel Bell | OL | | Miami | |
| 26 | Rayshaun Benny | DT | 6'3"/296 | Michigan | 1 tackle (1 solo) |
| 8 | Kaelon Black | RB | 5'9"/208 | Indiana | 2 rec, 9 yds; 8 rush, 45 yds |
| 11 | Lewis Bond | WR | 5'11"/197 | Boston College | |
| 71 | Jude Bowry | OL | 6'4"/314 | Boston College | |
| 52 | James Brockermeyer | OL | 6'3"/297 | Miami | |
| 6 | Barion Brown | WR | 5'10"/176 | LSU | 1 rec, 12 yds |
| 55 | Fernando Carmona | OL | 6'4"/318 | Arkansas | |
| 77 | Kage Casey | OL | 6'5"/309 | Boise State | |
| 3 | Kevin Coleman Jr. | WR | 5'11"/174 | Missouri | 1 rec, 3 yds |
| 24 | Keyron Crawford | OLB | 6'3"/251 | Auburn | 4 tackles (3 solo, 1 TFL), 1 sack |
| 80 | Josh Cuevas | TE | 6'3"/252 | Alabama | 1 rec, 6 yds |
| 74 | J. C. Davis | OL | 6'4"/335 | Illinois | |
| 2 | Fred Davis II | CB | 6'0"/197 | Northwestern | 1 pass breakup |
| 44 | Keyshaun Elliott | LB | 6'1"/233 | Arizona State | 4 tackles (2 solo) |
| 6 | Daylen Everette | CB | 6'0"/193 | Georgia | |
| 1 | Rahsul Faison | RB | | South Carolina | 1 rush |
| 44 | Will Ferrin | K | 6'2"/179 | BYU | |
| 0 | Malachi Fields | WR | 6'4"/218 | Notre Dame | 2 rec, 20 yds |
| 60 | Beau Gardner | LS | 6'4"/251 | Georgia | |
| 10 | Taylen Green | QB | 6'6"/229 | Arkansas | 2/4 passing, 18 yds; 4 rush, -12 yds |
| 84 | John Michael Gyllenborg | TE | 6'5"/251 | Wyoming | 1 rec, 6 yds; 1 tackle (1 solo) |
| 38 | Owen Heinecke | LB | 6'1"/224 | Oklahoma | 4 tackles |
| 1 | Ted Hurst | WR | 6'3"/207 | Georgia State | |
| 15 | Quintayvious Hutchins | DE | 6'2"/229 | Boston College | 5 tackles (3 solo, 3 TFL), 1 sack |
| 1 | Davison Igbinosun | DB | 6'2"/192 | Ohio State | |
| 58 | Max Iheanachor | OL | 6'5"/325 | Arizona State | |
| 17 | Gabe Jacas | DL | 6'3"/260 | Illinois | |
| 89 | Will Kacmarek | TE | 6'5"/262 | Ohio State | |
| 96 | Tim Keenan III | DT | 6'1"/332 | Alabama | |
| 17 | Jack Kelly | LB | 6'1"/246 | BYU | 4 tackles (2 solo) |
| 11 | Nyjalik Kelly | DE | | UCF | 2 tackles (1 solo) |
| 24 | Jalon Kilgore | SAF | 6'0"/211 | South Carolina | 4 tackles (4 solo) |
| 8 | Ja'Kobi Lane | WR | 6'4"/196 | USC | |
| 7 | Chris McClellan | DT | 6'3"/315 | Missouri | 1 tackle (0.5 TFL), 0.5 sack, 1 pass breakup |
| 8 | Derrick Moore | DE | 6'3"/254 | Michigan | |
| 5 | Malik Muhammad | CB | 5'11"/183 | Texas | |
| 23 | Julian Neal | CB | 6'1"/202 | Arkansas | 1 tackle |
| 18 | Garrett Nussmeier | QB | 6'1"/202 | LSU | 5/8 passing, 57 yds, 1 INT; 1 rush, 3 yds, 1 TD |
| 4 | Namdi Obiazor | LB | 6'2"/224 | TCU | 3 tackles |
| 78 | Ethan Onianwa | OL | 6'6"/332 | Ohio State | |
| 0 | Jaydn Ott | RB | 5'10"/202 | Oklahoma | 1 rec, 9 yds; 8 rush, 42 yds, 1 TD |
| 22 | LT Overton | DL | 6'2"/278 | Alabama | 1 tackle (1 solo, 1 TFL), 1 sack |
| 3 | T. J. Parker | DE | 6'3"/263 | Clemson | |
| 7 | Ephesians Prysock | CB | 6'2"/194 | Washington | 2 tackles (1 solo), 2 pass breakups |
| 7 | Kamari Ramsey | SAF | 5'11"/199 | USC | 1 tackle |
| 8 | Adam Randall | RB | 6'2"/233 | Clemson | 2 rush, 3 yds |
| 86 | Sam Roush | TE | 6'5"/259 | Stanford | |
| 66 | Jake Slaughter | OL | 6'4"/305 | Florida | |
| 10 | Xavian Sorey | LB | 6'1"/220 | Arkansas | 3 tackles (3 solo) |
| 7 | Jalen Stroman | DB | 6'0"/198 | Notre Dame | |
| 16 | Michael Taaffe | SAF | 5'11"/193 | Texas | 3 tackles |
| 65 | Logan Taylor | OL | 6'6"/305 | Boston College | |
| 92 | Brett Thorson | P | 6'1"/240 | Georgia | |
| 89 | Dan Villari | TE | 6'4"/243 | Syracuse | |
| 1 | Devin Voisin | WR | 5'9"/182 | South Alabama | |
| 4 | Mike Washington Jr. | RB | 6'0"/228 | Arkansas | 1 rec, 3 yds; 5 rush, 26 yds |
| 77 | Jeremiah Wright | OL | 6'5"/340 | Auburn | |
| 6 | Collin Wright | CB | 6'0"/186 | Stanford | 4 tackles (3 solo) |
| 9 | Zion Young | DE | 6'5"/262 | Missouri | 2 tackles (1 solo) |
