= Jermod McCoy =

American football player (born 2005)

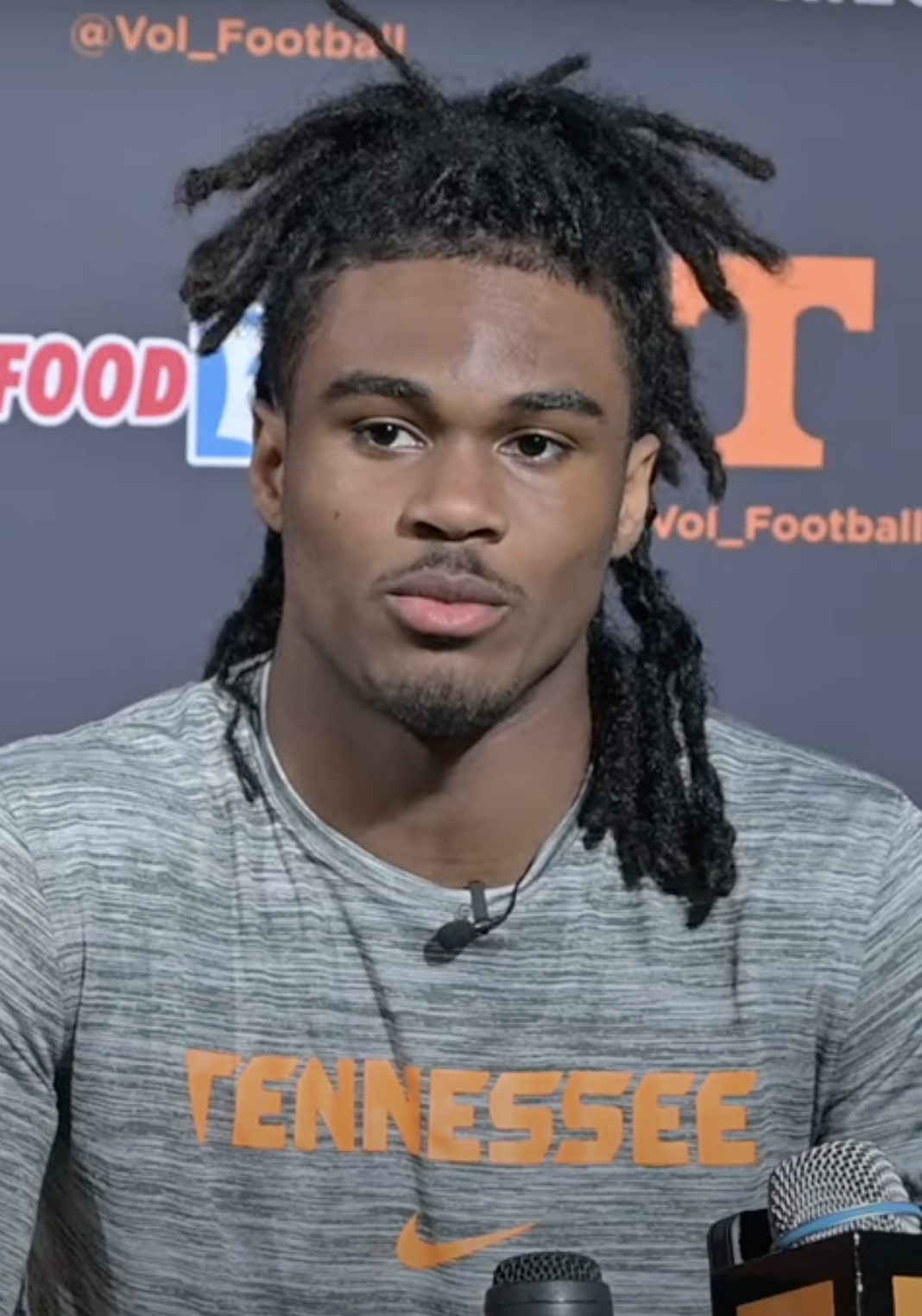
- McCoy with the Tennessee Volunteers in 2024

No. 28 – Las Vegas Raiders
- Position: Cornerback
- Roster status: Active

Personal information
- Born: August 16, 2005 (age 21); Nacogdoches, Texas, U.S.
- Listed height: 6 ft 0 in (1.83 m)
- Listed weight: 193 lb (88 kg)

Career information
- High school: Whitehouse (Whitehouse, Texas)
- College: Oregon State (2023); Tennessee (2024–2025)
- NFL draft: 2026: 4th round, 101st overall pick

Career history
- Las Vegas Raiders (2026–present)

Awards and highlights
- Second-team All-American (2024); Second-team All-SEC (2024)

Career NFL statistics as of Week 6, 2026
- Tackles: 4
- Stats at Pro Football Reference

Jermod Isaiah McCoy (born August 16, 2005) is an American professional football cornerback for the Las Vegas Raiders of the National Football League (NFL). McCoy played college football for the Oregon State Beavers and Tennessee Volunteers and was selected by the Raiders in the fourth round of the 2026 NFL draft.

== Early life ==
McCoy was born on August 16, 2005, in Tyler, Texas. He attended Whitehouse High School in Whitehouse, Texas. He played both cornerback and wide receiver in high school. As a senior, he had 28 tackles and two interceptions as a cornerback and 57 receptions for 784 yards and eight touchdowns as a receiver. A three-star recruit, McCoy committed to Oregon State University to play college football.

== College career ==
In his one year at Oregon State in 2023, McCoy played in all 12 games with five starts and had 31 tackles and two interceptions. After the season, he entered the transfer portal and transferred to the University of Tennessee. McCoy took over as a starter his first year at Tennessee in 2024. After missing the entire 2025 season due to a torn ACL, McCoy announced that he would forgo his final year of eligibility and declare for the 2026 NFL Draft.

=== Statistics ===
College statistics
Season	Team	GP	Tackles					Interceptions					Fumbles		
Season	Team	GP	Solo	Ast	Cmb	TFL	Sck	Int	Yds	Avg	TD	PD	FR	FF	TD
2023	Oregon State	12	16	15	31	1	0.0	2	17	8.5	0	7	1	0	0
2024	Tennessee	13	26	18	44	1	0.0	4	71	17.8	0	9	0	0	0
2025	Tennessee	0	Injured												
Career		25	42	33	75	2	0.0	6	88	14.7	0	16	1	0	0

== Professional career ==
Pre-draft measurables
Height	Weight	Arm length	Hand span	Wingspan	40-yard dash	10-yard split	20-yard split	Vertical jump	Broad jump	Bench press
6 ft 0 3/4 in (1.85 m)	188 lb (85 kg)	31 1/4 in (0.79 m)	9 in (0.23 m)	6 ft 5 in (1.96 m)	4.37 s	1.52 s	2.55 s	38.0 in (0.97 m)	10 ft 7 in (3.23 m)	14 reps
All values from NFL Combine/Pro Day

McCoy was selected by the Las Vegas Raiders in the fourth round with the 101st overall pick of the 2026 NFL draft. The selection was received from the Buffalo Bills in exchange for the 102nd overall pick and a 2027 seventh-round selection. McCoy made his NFL debut on September 20, 2026, against the Los Angeles Chargers.
