= Knoxville Catholic High School =

Location
- 9245 Fox Lonas Road; Knoxville, (Knox County), Tennessee 37923; United States; 35°55′48″N 84°5′30″W

Information
- Type: Private, Coeducational
- Motto: "Ut Christum Feram" (That I Might Bear Christ)
- Religious affiliations: Roman Catholic, Dominican Sisters
- Established: 1932
- President: Dickie Sompayrac
- Chaplain: Fr. Christopher Floersh
- Grades: 9–12
- Colors: Green and Gold
- Song: "Spirit of the Green and Gold"
- Mascot: Fighting Irish
- Accreditation: Southern Association of Colleges and Schools
- Newspaper: The Blarney Stone Press
- Yearbook: The Shamrock
- Website: https://knoxvillecatholic.com/

Knoxville Catholic High School (KCHS) is a parochial, Roman Catholic high school in Knoxville, Tennessee. It is located within the Roman Catholic Diocese of Knoxville.

== History ==
Knoxville Catholic High School, originally located on East Magnolia Avenue at 1610 E. Magnolia Avenue, registered 98 young students in 1932. The faculty was composed of four Sisters of Mercy and two lay teachers. The Reverend Christopher P. Murray was appointed director of Knoxville Catholic High School in 1941.

Additional facilities, including a gymnasium-auditorium, dressing rooms, showers, and a science laboratory, were added to the school. In 1947, KCHS became an accredited member of the Southern Association of Colleges and Secondary Schools. Construction started on another addition in March 1951.

The campus provided fields for softball, basketball, and other sports. Fr. Herbert Prescott became the first priest-principal of Knoxville Catholic High School in 1962. Father John Batson was named principal in 1965 and Father Xavier Mankel in 1967. Mankel retired in 1979.

Father Michael Johnston was appointed as the fourth priest-principal in 1979. Father Frank Richards followed in 1982. Father G. Patrick Garrity arrived as principal in 1985.

The decision to move KCHS to a new facility in the Cedar Bluff area in West Knoxville was announced in February 1997. In July 1997, Philip Dampf became the principal of KCHS and he oversaw the school's move to West Knoxville. The original facility would be taken over by Pellissippi State Community College as their Magnolia Avenue Campus.

By January 2000, the construction of new facilities was complete. The new campus was dedicated by Bishop Joseph E. Kurtz on January 3, 2000. In 2001, Dampf resigned and Dr. Aurelia Montgomery was appointed as interim principal. After the successful completion of a $1 million campaign, KCHS announced the building of a sports complex. The construction of the complex was completed in 2002.

In 2004, Dr. Montgomery retired as interim principal and Dickie Sompayrac began his tenure as KCHS principal in 2005. Also in 2005, a performing arts center was built and dedicated.

On January 6, 2008, Father Al Humbrecht performed a blessing ceremony for the completion of a new wing of the school. Fr. Chris Michelson, Pastor of St. Albert the Great and Capital Campaign Chair, announced the wing would be dedicated as Schaad Hall. Faris Field House added 8,000 square feet to the campuses, and includes weight training facilities and athletic offices.

On February 22, 2021, Knoxville Catholic broke ground on the St. Gregory the Great Auditorium. The new performing arts center opened and dedicated on April 25, 2022.

== Academics ==
KCHS is a member of the National Catholic Education Association and accredited by:

- Tennessee Department of Education
- Southern Association of Colleges and Schools
- Roman Catholic Diocese of Knoxville

== Sports ==
The mascot of Knoxville Catholic High School is the Fighting Irish. The school colors are green and gold.

=== Football ===
The Fighting Irish have won three state championships and been state runners-up once. In 2008, under the direction of head coach Mark Pemberton, the Fighting Irish had a 15–0 season and defeated Memphis Mitchell in the state championship game 28–18. In 2015, head coach Steve Matthews led the Irish to an 11–4 record and the school's second ever state title after defeating Pearl-Cohn 48–8. In 2017, Matthews became the first Knoxville Catholic football coach to win multiple state titles, guiding the Irish to a 12–3 record and a 45–28 victory over Beech in the state championship contest.

The Irish have had eight TSSAA Mr. Football winners: Rob Demastus (Division II Class A back of the year in 1999), Jeremy Bentley (Division II Class A/AA lineman of the year in 2003), Nick McFadden (Division II Class A/AA back of the year in 2004), Harrison Smith (Division I Class 3A back of the year in 2006), Daniel Hood (Division I Class 3A lineman of the year in 2008), Kyler Kerbyson (Division 1 Class 3A lineman of the year in 2010), Amari Rodgers (Division I Class 4A back of the year 2015 & 2016), and Cade Mays (Division I Class 4A lineman of the year 2016 & 2017). Harrison Smith was also named the Gatorade Player of the Year for Tennessee in 2006.

=== State titles ===
Knoxville Catholic has won 45 team and individual TSSAA state championships.

- Boys' Basketball: 2020
- Girls' Basketball: 2023
- Boys' Cross Country: 2015, 2016, 2018, 2024
- Girls' Cross Country: 2009, 2010, 2019
- Football: 2008, 2015, 2017
- Boys' Golf: 2016
- Boys' Soccer: 2008
- Girls' Soccer: 2013, 2014
- Boys' Tennis: 2008, 2009, 2014, 2015
- Girls' Tennis: 2016, 2017, 2021, 2022, 2023
- Boys' Track & Field: 1967, 1990, 2007, 2014, 2015, 2016, 2017, 2018, 2019
- Girls' Track & Field: 1994, 2006, 2009, 2010, 2011, 2012, 2014, 2018
- Girls' Volleyball: 2016, 2021
- Wrestling: 1995
- Baseball: 2023

== Notable alumni ==
- Tyler Baron, NFL defensive end for the New York Jets (2020)
- Blue Cain, basketball player for the Georgia Bulldogs (didn't graduate)
- Jeff Faris, head coach of Austin Peay Governors football
- Briston Maroney, singer, songwriter, and guitarist (2016)
- Cade Mays, NFL offensive lineman (2018)
- Cooper Mays, offensive lineman at the Tennessee Volunteers (2020)
- Cormac McCarthy, Pulitzer Prize winning novelist and author of The Road (1951)
- Brian Metz, college football tight ends coach at UNC Charlotte (2009)
- Cal Raleigh, MLB catcher (attended)
- Amari Rodgers, NFL wide receiver (2017)
- Harrison Smith, NFL safety for the Minnesota Vikings, 6x Pro Bowl selection (2007)
