= Cade Mays =

American football player (born 1999)

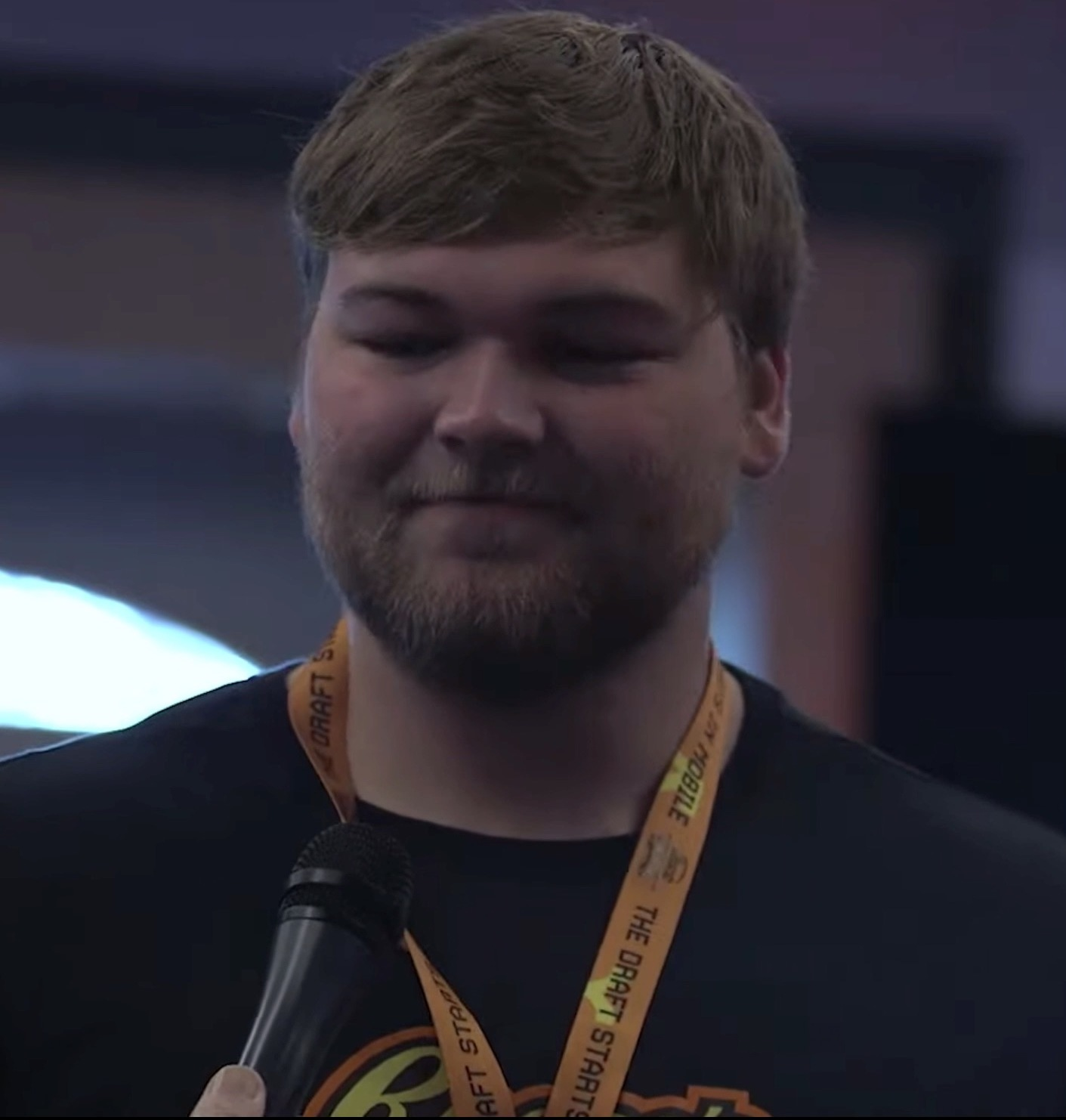
- Mays at the 2022 Senior Bowl

No. 64 – Detroit Lions
- Position: Center
- Roster status: Injured reserve

Personal information
- Born: April 26, 1999 (age 27); Knoxville, Tennessee, U.S.
- Listed height: 6 ft 6 in (1.98 m)
- Listed weight: 325 lb (147 kg)

Career information
- High school: Knoxville Catholic
- College: Georgia (2018–2019); Tennessee (2020–2021)
- NFL draft: 2022: 6th round, 199th overall pick

Career history
- Carolina Panthers (2022–2023); New York Giants (2024)*; Carolina Panthers (2024–2025); Detroit Lions (2026–present)
- * Offseason or practice squad member only

Awards and highlights
- Second-team All-SEC (2021); SEC All-Freshman Team (2018); Freshman All-American (2018)

Career NFL statistics as of 2025
- Games played: 52
- Games started: 27
- Stats at Pro Football Reference

Cade Montgomery Mays (born April 26, 1999) is an American professional football center for the Detroit Lions of the National Football League (NFL). He played college football for the Georgia Bulldogs and Tennessee Volunteers. Mays was selected by the Carolina Panthers in the sixth round of the 2022 NFL draft.

== College career ==
Mays started his college career at Georgia. As a freshman in 2018, he earned Freshman All-American honors as well as being selected to the SEC All-Freshman Team. During his two years with the Bulldogs, he had at least one start for each position across the offensive line. After the 2019 season, he transferred to Tennessee. He then played two years for the Volunteers, primarily at the right tackle position. Following the conclusion of his final collegiate season in 2021, he earned a second-team All-SEC selection by the Associated Press and conference coaches.

== Professional career ==
=== Pre-draft statistics ===
Pre-draft measurables
Height	Weight	Arm length	Hand span	Wingspan	40-yard dash	10-yard split	20-yard split	20-yard shuttle	Three-cone drill	Vertical jump	Broad jump	Bench press
6 ft 4 3/4 in (1.95 m)	311 lb (141 kg)	34 1/8 in (0.87 m)	10 in (0.25 m)	6 ft 10 1/4 in (2.09 m)	5.24 s	1.81 s	3.02 s	4.63 s	7.57 s	26.0 in (0.66 m)	8 ft 6 in (2.59 m)	21 reps
All values from NFL Combine/Pro Day

=== Carolina Panthers (first stint) ===
==== 2022 ====
Mays was drafted by the Carolina Panthers in the 6th round of the 2022 NFL Draft, being selected 199th overall. He made his NFL debut in Week 7 against the Tampa Bay Buccaneers. He made his first start in Week 12 against the Denver Broncos. He appeared in 11 games and made two starts in his rookie season.

==== 2023 ====
In the 2023 season, Mays appeared in 16 games and started five.

==== 2024 ====
On August 28, 2024, Mays was released by the Panthers.

=== New York Giants ===
On September 10, 2024, Mays was signed to the New York Giants' practice squad.

=== Carolina Panthers (second stint) ===
On October 8, 2024, Mays was re-signed by the Carolina Panthers off the Giants practice squad.

On March 12, 2025, the Panthers placed an original-round tender on Mays. He was named the starting center in Week 3 following an injury to Austin Corbett, and started 12 games on the season.

=== Detroit Lions ===
On March 9, 2026, Mays signed with the Detroit Lions on a three-year contract worth $25 million.

On August 10, 2026, it was announced that Mays had fractured his wrist during training camp practice and was expected to miss approximately 8–10 weeks of time from the date of the injury. He was placed on injured reserve on August 30. On October 24, Mays was activated off injured reserve. On November 21, Mays was placed on injured reserve again.

== Personal life ==
Mays enjoys fishing and is an avid hunter. He collects turkey stones as a hobby.

Both his father, Kevin, and younger brother, Cooper, played as linemen for Tennessee from 1991-1994 and 2020-2024, respectively.
