= James Pearce Jr. =

American football player (born 2003)

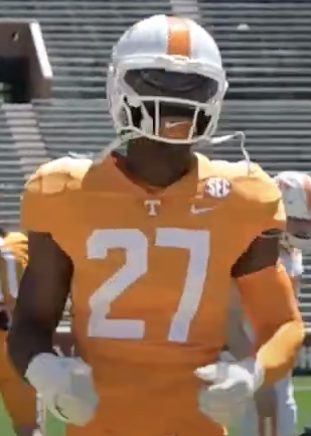
- Pearce with the Tennessee Volunteers in 2024

No. 27 – Atlanta Falcons
- Position: Defensive end
- Roster status: Active

Personal information
- Born: October 12, 2003 (age 23); Charlotte, North Carolina, U.S.
- Listed height: 6 ft 5 in (1.96 m)
- Listed weight: 243 lb (110 kg)

Career information
- High school: Julius L. Chambers (Charlotte)
- College: Tennessee (2022–2024)
- NFL draft: 2025: 1st round, 26th overall pick

Career history
- Atlanta Falcons (2025–present)

Awards and highlights
- PFWA All-Rookie Team (2025); 2× First-team All-SEC (2023, 2024)

Career NFL statistics as of 2025
- Tackles: 26
- Sacks: 10.5
- Forced fumbles: 1
- Pass deflections: 5
- Fumble recoveries: 1
- Stats at Pro Football Reference

James Cecil Pearce Jr. (born October 12, 2003) is an American professional football defensive end for the Atlanta Falcons of the National Football League (NFL). He played college football for the Tennessee Volunteers and selected by the Falcons in the first round of the 2025 NFL draft.

== Early life ==
Pearce Jr. was born and grew up in Charlotte, North Carolina. He attended Julius L. Chambers High School in Charlotte. As a senior, he had 14.5 sacks and two interceptions. He helped lead his team to back-to-back North Carolina 4AA state championships in 2019 and 2020. A four-star prospect, he committed to the University of Tennessee to play college football.

== College career ==
As a true freshman at Tennessee in 2022, Pearce Jr. played in all 13 games and had five tackles and two sacks. He returned to Tennessee for his sophomore year in 2023. During the 2023 season, he tied with two others in the SEC for the most sacks with ten and fifth in the SEC regarding tackles for loss. In the Citrus Bowl against Iowa, he recorded a 52-yard interception return for a touchdown.

== Professional career ==
Pre-draft measurables
Height	Weight	Arm length	Hand span	Wingspan	40-yard dash	10-yard split	20-yard split	Vertical jump	Broad jump
6 ft 5 1/4 in (1.96 m)	245 lb (111 kg)	32 3/4 in (0.83 m)	10 in (0.25 m)	6 ft 8 7/8 in (2.05 m)	4.47 s	1.56 s	2.61 s	31.0 in (0.79 m)	10 ft 3 in (3.12 m)
All values from NFL Combine

=== 2025 ===
Pearce was drafted in the first round with the 26th overall pick in the 2025 NFL draft by the Atlanta Falcons. The Falcons traded up with the Los Angeles Rams to pick Pearce, giving up their 2026 first-round pick as well as a 2025 third and 2025 seventh. In Week 2 against the Minnesota Vikings Pearce recorded his first career sack, taking down Vikings QB J. J. McCarthy. He was named NFL Defensive Rookie of the Month for December. He finished the season with 26 tackles, 10.5 sacks, and a forced fumble. He led all rookies in sacks and set a franchise record for most sacks in a season by a rookie. He was named to the PFWA NFL All-Rookie Team for the 2025 season.

=== 2026 ===
On August 14, 2026, the NFL announced that Pearce would be suspended for eight regular season games due to violating the leagues personal conduct policy following his arrest in February due to a domestic dispute.

== Career statistics ==
Legend
**Bold**	Career high

=== NFL ===
Year	Team	Games		Tackles							Interceptions					Fumbles			
Year	Team	GP	GS	Cmb	Solo	Ast	TFL	QBH	Sck	Sfty	Int	Yds	Lng	TD	PD	FF	FR	Yds	TD
2025	ATL	17	3	26	17	9	10	16	10.5	0	0	0	0	0	5	1	1	27	0
Career		17	3	26	17	9	10	16	10.5	0	0	0	0	0	5	1	1	27	0

=== College ===
Year	Team	GP	Tackles					Interceptions					Fumbles			
Year	Team	GP	Cmb	Solo	Ast	TFL	Sck	Int	Yds	Avg	TD	PD	FF	FR	Yds	TD
2022	Tennessee	13	5	3	2	2.0	2.0	0	0	—	0	0	0	0	0	0
2023	Tennessee	13	28	18	10	**14.5**	**10.0**	**1**	**52**	**52.0**	**1**	**1**	**2**	0	0	0
2024	Tennessee	13	**38**	**23**	**15**	13.0	7.5	0	0	—	0	**1**	1	**1**	0	0
Career		39	71	44	27	29.5	19.5	1	52	52.0	1	2	3	1	0	0

== Legal issues ==
In December 2023, Pearce was arrested in Knoxville and charged with speeding, driving on a suspended license, failure to present insurance, registration improperly displayed and improper window tinting, which were all labeled as misdemeanors. Pearce’s charges were dropped on December 12, 2023, and the license, insurance and window tinting charges were dismissed while the speeding charge was dismissed after Pearce paid costs of $278.

On February 7, 2026, Pearce was arrested in Miami-Dade County, Florida, on two charges of aggravated battery with a deadly weapon and one count of aggravated stalking, with the victim being WNBA player Rickea Jackson. He was also charged with fleeing and eluding police officers, aggravated battery of a law enforcement officer and resisting an officer without violence to his person.

On April 8, 2026, Falcons coach Kevin Stefanski said that Pearce would not be with the team at the start of the voluntary offseason workout program as a result of his ongoing legal issues.
