= Ja'Quinden Jackson =

American football player (born 2001)

Profile
- Position: Running back

Personal information
- Born: September 12, 2001 (age 25); Dallas, Texas, U.S.
- Listed height: 6 ft 2 in (1.88 m)
- Listed weight: 233 lb (106 kg)

Career information
- High school: Duncanville (Duncanville, Texas)
- College: Texas (2020); Utah (2021–2023); Arkansas (2024)
- NFL draft: 2025: undrafted

Career history
- Jacksonville Jaguars (2025); Philadelphia Eagles (2026)*
- * Offseason or practice squad member only

Awards and highlights
- Second-team All-SEC (2024)
- Stats at Pro Football Reference

Ja'Quinden Jackson (born September 12, 2001) is an American professional football running back. He played college football for the Texas Longhorns, Utah Utes, and Arkansas Razorbacks.

== Early life ==
Jackson attended Duncanville High School in Duncanville, Texas. He played quarterback in high school. He committed to the University of Texas at Austin to play college football.

== College career ==
Jackson spent 2020 at Texas but did not play in any games. After the season, he entered the transfer portal and transferred to the University of Utah. In his first year at Utah, he played in three games as a backup to Cameron Rising, and had six rushes for 30 yards and a touchdown. In 2022, Jackson moved to running back. He finished the year with 531 yards on 78 carries with nine touchdowns. He took over as the starting running back in 2023.

On December 27, 2023, Jackson announced that he would enter the transfer portal for the second time. On January 5, 2024, he announced that he would be transferring to the University of Arkansas.

=== Statistics ===
| Year | Team | Games | | Rushing | | | | Receiving | | | |
| Year | Team | GP | GS | Att | Yards | Avg | TD | Rec | Yards | Avg | TD |
|---|---|---|---|---|---|---|---|---|---|---|---|
| 2020 | Texas | Did not play | | | | | | | | | |
| 2021 | Utah | 3 | 0 | 6 | 30 | 5.0 | 1 | 0 | 0 | 0.0 | 0 |
| 2022 | Utah | 12 | 0 | 78 | 531 | 6.8 | 9 | 1 | 8 | 8.0 | 0 |
| 2023 | Utah | 12 | 12 | 161 | 797 | 4.9 | 4 | 9 | 53 | 5.9 | 0 |
| 2024 | Arkansas | 10 | 10 | 149 | 790 | 5.3 | 15 | 13 | 139 | 10.7 | 0 |
| Career | | 37 | 22 | 394 | 2,148 | 5.5 | 29 | 23 | 200 | 8.7 | 0 |

== Professional career ==
Pre-draft measurables
| Height | Weight | Arm length | Hand span | Wingspan | 40-yard dash | 10-yard split | 20-yard split | 20-yard shuttle | Three-cone drill | Vertical jump | Broad jump | Bench press |
|---|---|---|---|---|---|---|---|---|---|---|---|---|
| 6 ft 1 1/2 in (1.87 m) | 229 lb (104 kg) | 33 in (0.84 m) | 9 1/2 in (0.24 m) | 6 ft 7 3/8 in (2.02 m) | 4.75 s | 1.64 s | 2.69 s | 4.36 s | 7.19 s | 33.5 in (0.85 m) | 10 ft 0 in (3.05 m) | 15 reps |
All values from NFL Combine/Pro Day

=== Jacksonville Jaguars ===
On April 27, 2025, Jackson signed with the Jacksonville Jaguars as an undrafted free agent. He was waived on August 26 as part of final roster cuts. Jackson was re-signed to the team's practice squad the following day. He signed a reserve/future contract with Jacksonville on January 12, 2026.

On May 11, 2026, Jackson was waived by the Jaguars.

=== Philadelphia Eagles ===
On August 10, 2026, Jackson signed with the Philadelphia Eagles. While making a tackle on the opening kickoff in the team's second preseason matchup against the New England Patriots, Jackson took a hit to the head that left him on the ground for several minutes before leaving the game in an ambulance. He was released from the hospital and returned home with his teammates. On August 24, Jackson was waived by the Eagles with an injury settlement.
