= Cooper Mays =

American football player (born 2001)

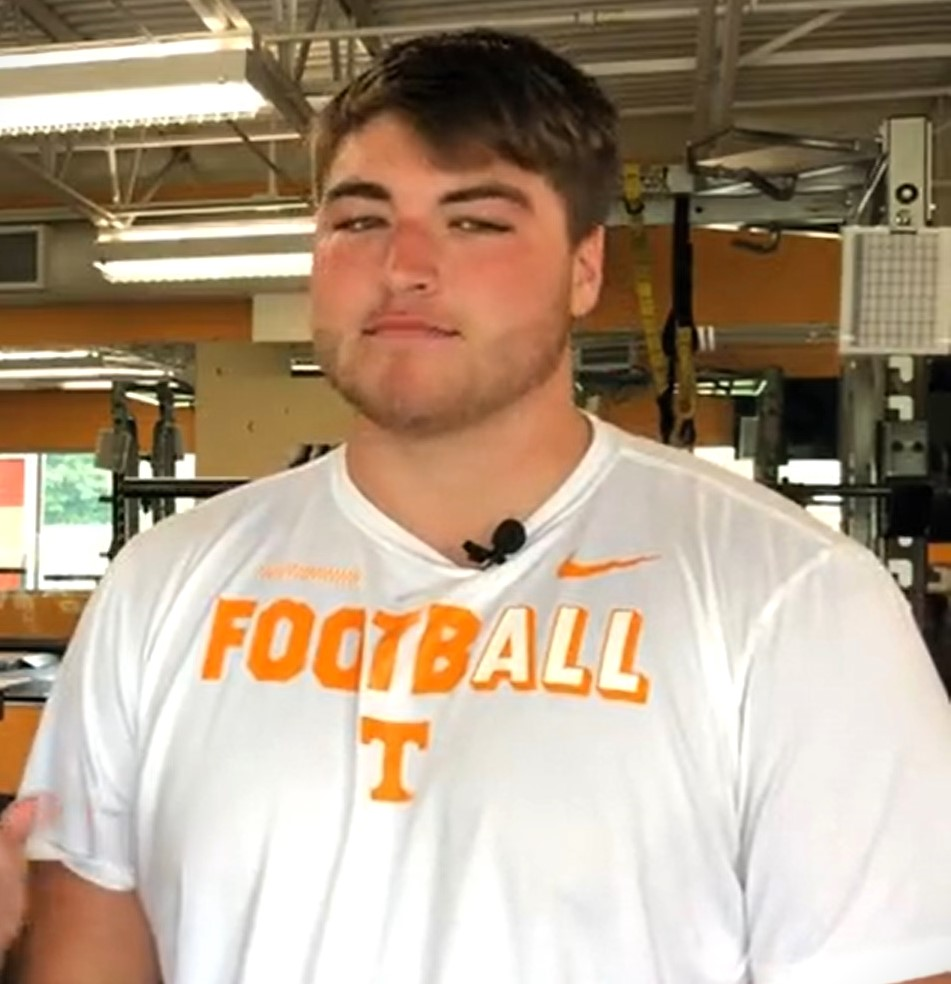
- Mays in 2019

No. 63
- Position: Center

Personal information
- Born: March 11, 2001 (age 25); Knoxville, Tennessee, U.S.
- Listed height: 6 ft 2 in (1.88 m)
- Listed weight: 305 lb (138 kg)

Career information
- High school: Knoxville Catholic (Knoxville, Tennessee)
- College: Tennessee (2020–2024)
- NFL draft: 2025: undrafted

Awards and highlights
- First-team All-American (2024); First-team All-SEC (2024); Second-team All-SEC (2023)

Cooper Morgan Mays (born March 11, 2001) is an American football center. Mays previously played for the Tennessee Volunteers.

== Early life ==
Mays was born on March 11, 2001. He was born in Knoxville, Tennessee, but grew up on a farm in Kingston, Tennessee. Mays attended Knoxville Catholic High School, where he played football. After being named an all-state player by the TSWA during his junior and senior years, Mays was rated as a four-star recruit and a consensus top-ten center in his class. Mays committed to play college football for the University of Tennessee over Auburn, Duke, Florida, and Georgia.

== College career ==
In his freshman year, Mays played in ten games for Tennessee and started two. Mays started eight games the following year despite an injury that caused him to miss six games during the year. In his junior year, Mays started all thirteen games of the season and helped the Tennessee offensive line be named a semifinalist for the Joe Moore Award and the Tennessee offense be ranked number one in the nation. Before the 2023 season, Mays was named on the preseason watchlist for the Rimington Trophy. On August 9, Mays underwent surgery for a hernia. The procedure caused him to miss the first four games of the season; nevertheless, Mays started the final nine games and again was a part of the Tennessee offensive line that was named a semifinalist for the Joe Moore Award. Additionally, Mays was named a member of the second-team All-SEC team. Mays elected to use the extra year of eligibility granted by the NCAA for the shortened 2020 season and return to Tennessee for a fifth year. Before the 2024 season started, Mays was named on the watchlist for the first and second All-SEC teams, the first and second All-American teams, along with the Outland Trophy and the Rimington Trophy. Following the regular season, Mays was named to the first-team All-SEC team and became the first finalist for the Rimington Trophy in Tennessee football history. Additionally, Mays was named a first-team All-American.

== Professional career ==
Pre-draft measurables
| Height | Weight | Arm length | Hand span | 20-yard shuttle | Three-cone drill | Vertical jump | Broad jump |
|---|---|---|---|---|---|---|---|
| 6 ft 2 3/8 in (1.89 m) | 305 lb (138 kg) | 32 1/4 in (0.82 m) | 9 1/2 in (0.24 m) | 4.81 s | 8.24 s | 26.0 in (0.66 m) | 8 ft 5 in (2.57 m) |
All values from Pro Day

In May 2025, Mays received a tryout to Miami Dolphins rookie minicamp.

== Personal life ==
Mays' brother, Cade Mays, played football at Tennessee with Cooper before becoming an offensive lineman in the NFL. Mays' father, Kevin, also played football at Tennessee, playing from 1991 to 1994 and serving as captain of the team. Mays graduated with a degree in sports management in 2024.
