= Jalen McMurray =

American football player (born 2003)

DC Defenders
- Position: Cornerback
- Roster status: Unsigned draft pick

Personal information
- Born: January 7, 2003 (age 23); Silver Spring, Maryland, U.S.
- Listed height: 5 ft 11 in (1.80 m)
- Listed weight: 184 lb (83 kg)

Career information
- High school: Gonzaga (Washington, D.C.)
- College: Temple (2021–2023); Tennessee (2024–2025)
- NFL draft: 2026: undrafted

Career history
- Tennessee Titans (2026)*; DC Defenders (2027-present)
- * Offseason or practice squad member only

Awards and highlights
- First team All-American Conference (2025)
- Stats at Pro Football Reference

Jalen Christopher McMurray (born January 7, 2003) is an American professional football cornerback for the DC Defenders of the United Football League (UFL). He played college football for the Tennessee Volunteers and Temple Owls and was selected by the Defenders as Mr. Irrelevant after they selected him with the 119th and final pick in the 2027 UFL draft.

== Early life ==
McMurray attended Gonzaga College High School, where he was a 3 year starter and an All Conference performer in the highly competitive Washington Catholic Athletic Conference (WCAC). As a sophomore, Gonzaga won the 2018 WCAC Championship in what some have described as the best high school football game ever. To date, this game contained 5 current NFL players. The 2020 COVID epidemic postponed Jalen's senior season until Spring of 2021. As Captain, he was integral in leading the Eagles to an undefeated (5-0) truncated season. Coming out of high school, McMurray was rated as a two-star recruit, where he committed to play college football for the Temple Owls.

== College career ==
=== Temple ===
During his first collegiate season in 2021, McMurray used the season to redshirt. Over the next two seasons in 2022 and 2023, he started in 23 games, where he totaled 88 tackles, eleven pass deflections, an interception, a fumble recovery, and two forced fumbles. In 2022, he started all 12 games, became the first freshman cornerback to earn a single-digit jersey number since 2019 second-round draft pick Rock Ya-Sin and was named a second-team All-American by College Football News After the conclusion of the 2023 season, McMurray decided to enter his name into the NCAA transfer portal.

=== Tennessee ===
McMurray transferred to play for the Tennessee Volunteers. During his first season with the Volunteers in 2024, he totaled 14 tackles and four pass deflections. McMurray entered the 2025 season, as a starter in the Tennessee secondary. In week one of the 2025 season, he notched a sack and a pass deflection in a season opening win over Syracuse. For his performance during the 2025 season, he was named to the SEC Community Service Team, an SEC Academic Honor Roll member, as well as accepting an invite to participate in the 2026 Senior Bowl.

== Professional career ==
Pre-draft measurables
| Height | Weight | Arm length | Hand span | Wingspan | 40-yard dash | 10-yard split | 20-yard split | 20-yard shuttle | Three-cone drill | Vertical jump | Bench press |
|---|---|---|---|---|---|---|---|---|---|---|---|
| 5 ft 11 in (1.80 m) | 184 lb (83 kg) | 30 1/2 in (0.77 m) | 8 3/8 in (0.21 m) | 6 ft 1 in (1.85 m) | 4.56 s | 1.54 s | 2.64 s | 4.55 s | 7.42 s | 34.5 in (0.88 m) | 11 reps |
All values from Pro Day

On April 30, 2026, after going undrafted in the 2026 NFL draft, McMurray signed with the Tennessee Titans as an undrafted free agent. He was waived by the Titans as a part of final roster cuts on August 30, but re–signed with the team's practice squad the next day. On October 6, he was released.
