= Dylan Sampson =

American football player (born 2004)

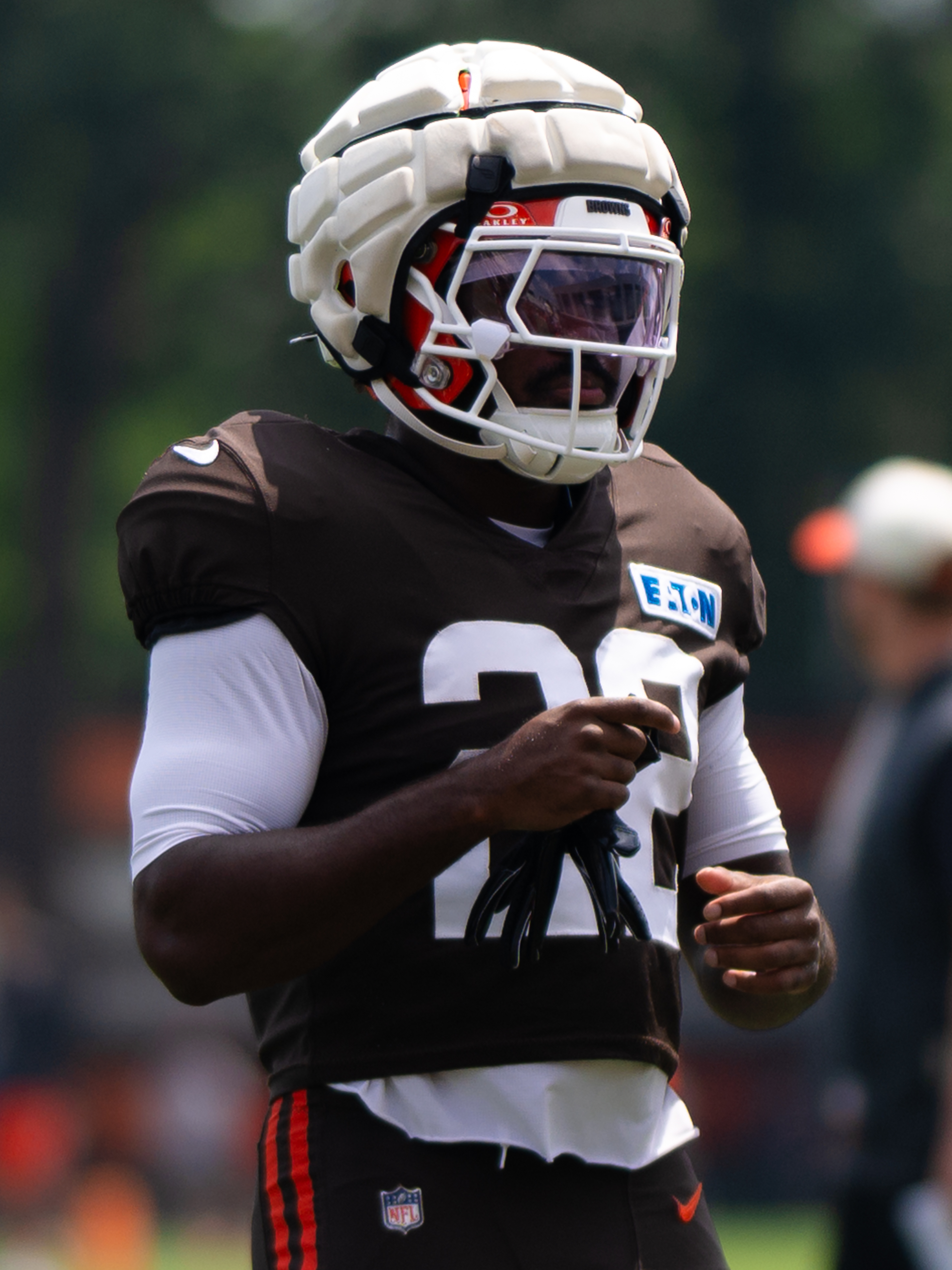
- Sampson with the Cleveland Browns in 2026

No. 22 – Cleveland Browns
- Position: Running back
- Roster status: Active

Personal information
- Born: September 14, 2004 (age 22); Baton Rouge, Louisiana, U.S.
- Listed height: 5 ft 8 in (1.73 m)
- Listed weight: 200 lb (91 kg)

Career information
- High school: Dutchtown (Geismar, Louisiana)
- College: Tennessee (2022–2024)
- NFL draft: 2025: 4th round, 126th overall pick

Career history
- Cleveland Browns (2025–present)

Awards and highlights
- First-team All-SEC (2024); Second-team All-American (2024); SEC Offensive Player of the Year (2024)

Career NFL statistics as of 2025
- Rushing yards: 175
- Rushing average: 2.7
- Receptions: 33
- Receiving yards: 271
- Receiving touchdowns: 2
- Return yards: 360
- Stats at Pro Football Reference

Dylan Jacob Sampson (born September 14, 2004) is an American professional football running back for the Cleveland Browns of the National Football League (NFL). He played college football for the Tennessee Volunteers and was the 2024 SEC Offensive Player of the Year after rushing for 22 touchdowns with 1,400 yards. Sampson was selected by the Browns in the fourth round of the 2025 NFL draft.

== Early life ==
Sampson was born in Baton Rouge, Louisiana and attended Dutchtown High School in Geismar, Louisiana. During his high school career, Sampson surpassed Eddie Lacy as the school's all-time leading rusher. As a junior, he ran for 1,327 yards and 15 touchdowns in eight games. He followed that up as a senior by rushing for 1,374 yards and 22 touchdowns. A four-star recruit, Sampson committed to play college football at the University of Tennessee over offers from Arkansas, Mississippi State, LSU and Penn State.

== College career ==
As a freshman, Sampson ran for 397 yards and six touchdowns on 58 carries, in addition to leading the team with 6.8 yards per carry, in the 2022 season. In the 2023 season opener against Virginia, he recorded four total touchdowns—three rushing and one receiving—helping lead the Volunteers to a 49−13 victory. Against UTSA, Sampson rushed for a career-high 139 yards and two touchdowns. After playing as a backup through the majority of his first two seasons, Sampson got an opportunity to make his first career start against Iowa in the Citrus Bowl. Against Iowa, he rushed for 133 yards on 20 carries. Sampson finished his sophomore season rushing for 604 yards and seven touchdowns while also recording 175 receiving yards for a touchdown.

In the 2024 season, Sampson broke the school record for single-season rushing touchdowns, a mark previously held by Gene McEver since the 1929 season. At the end of the year, he was named First-Team All-SEC and earned SEC Offensive Player of the Year.

On December 27, 2024, Sampson declared for the 2025 NFL draft.

=== Statistics ===
College statistics
| Season | Games | Rushing | | | | Receiving | | | |
| Season | GP | Att | Yards | Avg | TD | Rec | Yards | Avg | TD |
|---|---|---|---|---|---|---|---|---|---|
| 2022 | 10 | 58 | 397 | 6.8 | 6 | 3 | 24 | 8.0 | 0 |
| 2023 | 12 | 106 | 604 | 5.7 | 7 | 17 | 175 | 10.3 | 1 |
| 2024 | 12 | 256 | 1,485 | 5.8 | 22 | 19 | 141 | 7.4 | 0 |
| Career | 34 | 420 | 2,486 | 5.9 | 35 | 39 | 340 | 8.7 | 1 |

== Professional career ==
Pre-draft measurables
| Height | Weight | Arm length | Hand span | Wingspan | 40-yard dash | 10-yard split | 20-yard split | Vertical jump | Broad jump | Bench press |
|---|---|---|---|---|---|---|---|---|---|---|
| 5 ft 8 1/8 in (1.73 m) | 200 lb (91 kg) | 30 1/2 in (0.77 m) | 8 3/4 in (0.22 m) | 6 ft 1 in (1.85 m) | 4.46 s | 1.58 s | 2.59 s | 35.0 in (0.89 m) | 10 ft 4 in (3.15 m) | 13 reps |
All values from NFL Combine/Pro Day

Sampson was selected in the fourth round, with the 126th overall pick of the 2025 NFL draft by the Cleveland Browns. He signed a contract with the team on May 9, 2025. In his NFL debut, he had 12 carries for 29 rushing yards to go with eight receptions for 64 receiving yards in a 17–16 loss to the Cincinnati Bengals. He scored his first NFL touchdown on an eight-yard reception from quarterback Dillon Gabriel in Week 2 against the Baltimore Ravens. As a rookie, he finished with 65 carries for 175 rushing yards to go with 33 receptions for 271 receiving yards and two receiving touchdowns.

On September 15, 2026, Sampson was placed on injured reserve due to a left knee injury suffered in the team's season opener against the Jacksonville Jaguars.
