= Jamil Muhammad (American football) =

American football player (born 2001)

Columbus Aviators
- Position: Defensive end
- Roster status: Unsigned draft pick

Personal information
- Born: February 1, 2001 (age 25); Madison, Alabama, U.S.
- Listed height: 6 ft 1 in (1.85 m)
- Listed weight: 260 lb (118 kg)

Career information
- High school: James Clemens (Madison, Alabama)
- College: Georgia State (2019–2022); USC (2023–2024)
- NFL draft: 2025: undrafted

Career history
- Los Angeles Rams (2025)*; Carolina Panthers (2025)*; Cleveland Browns (2026)*; Edmonton Elks (2026)*; Columbus Aviators (2027-present)
- * Offseason or practice squad member only

Jamil Muhammad (born February 1, 2001) is an American football defensive end. He played college football for the Georgia State Panthers and USC Trojans.

== Early life ==
Muhammad attended James Clemens High School in Madison, Alabama, and committed to play college football for the Vanderbilt Commodores.

== College career ==
Muhammad initially enrolled at Vanderbilt, but transferred to play for the Georgia State Panthers ahead of the 2019 season. That season, he took a redshirt. Heading into the 2020 season, Muhammad switched positions from quarterback to linebacker. In three seasons from 2020 to 2022, he totaled 70 tackles with 11 for a loss, seven and a half sacks, three forced fumbles, and an interception. After the 2022 season, Muhammad entered the NCAA transfer portal.

Muhammad transferred to play for the USC Trojans. In two seasons at USC from 2023 to 2024, he recorded 73 tackles with 12 for a loss and seven and a half sacks.

== Professional career ==
=== Los Angeles Rams ===
After going undrafted in the 2025 NFL draft, Muhammad signed with the Los Angeles Rams as an undrafted free agent. He was released during final roster cuts on August 26, 2025, and re-signed to the team's practice squad the following day. On November 17, 2025, Muhammad was released by the Rams.

=== Carolina Panthers ===
On December 18, 2025, Muhammad signed to the Carolina Panthers practice squad. After the conclusion of the 2025 season, he signed a futures contract with the Panthers.

On May 20, 2026, Muhammad was waived by the Panthers.

=== Cleveland Browns ===
On August 19, 2026, Muhammad signed with the Cleveland Browns. He was waived by the Browns on August 28.

=== Edmonton Elks ===
The Edmonton Elks announced that they had signed Mohammad to their practice roster on September 15, 2026. On October 14, he was released.
