= 2024 All-SEC football team =

American college football all-star team

The 2024 All-SEC football team consists of American football players selected to the All-Southeastern Conference (SEC) chosen by the Associated Press (AP) and the conference coaches for the 2024 Southeastern Conference football season.

Georgia won the conference, defeating Texas 22–19 in the SEC Championship.

Tennessee running back Dylan Sampson was voted the conference's Offensive Player of the Year (AP and Coaches).South Carolina defensive end Kyle Kennard was selected the Defensive Player of the Year (AP and Coaches). Kentucky placekicker Alex Raynor was named the SEC Special Teams Player of the Year. South Carolina quarterback LaNorris Sellers was voted SEC Freshman of the Year and Vanderbilt quarterback Diego Pavia was voted SEC Newcomer of the Year (AP and Coaches). Shane Beamer of South Carolina and Clark Lea of Vanderbilt were voted SEC Coach of the Year (AP and Coaches respectively).

== Offensive selections ==
=== Quarterbacks ===
- Jaxson Dart, Ole Miss (AP-1, Coaches-1)
- Quinn Ewers, Texas (Coaches-2)
- Diego Pavia, Vanderbilt (AP-2)
- LaNorris Sellers, South Carolina (Coaches-3)

=== Running backs ===
- Dylan Sampson, Tennessee (AP-1, Coaches-1)
- Jarquez Hunter, Auburn (AP-1, Coaches-1)
- Raheim Sanders, South Carolina (AP-2, Coaches-2)
- Ja’Quinden Jackson, Arkansas (Coaches-2)
- Le’Veon Moss, Texas A&M (AP-2)

=== Wide receivers ===
- Andrew Armstrong, Arkansas (AP-1, Coaches-2)
- Tre Harris, Ole Miss (AP-1)
- Ryan Coleman-Williams, Alabama (AP-2, Coaches-1)
- Luther Burden III, Missouri (Coaches-1)
- Kyren Lacy, LSU (AP-2)
- KeAndre Lambert-Smith, Auburn (AP-2, Coaches-2)

=== Centers ===
- Cooper Mays, Tennessee (AP-2, Coaches-1)
- Jake Slaughter, Florida (AP-1)
- Jared Wilson, Georgia (Coaches-2)

=== Offensive line ===
- Kelvin Banks Jr., Texas (AP-1, Coaches-1)
- Will Campbell, LSU (AP-1, Coaches-1)
- Tyler Booker, Alabama (AP-1, Coaches-1)
- Tate Ratledge, Georgia (AP-1, Coaches-1)
- Emery Jones, LSU (AP-2, Coaches-2)
- Armand Membou, Missouri (AP-2, Coaches-2)
- Dylan Fairchild, Georgia (AP-2, Coaches-2)
- Cam’Ron Johnson, Missouri (AP-2)
- Kadyn Proctor, Alabama (Coaches-2)

=== Tight ends ===
- Gunnar Helm, Texas (AP-1, Coaches-2)
- Eli Stowers, Vanderbilt (AP-2, Coaches-1)

== Defensive selections ==
=== Defensive ends ===
- Kyle Kennard, South Carolina (AP-1, Coaches-1)
- Princely Umanmielen, Ole Miss (AP-1, Coaches-1)
- James Pearce Jr., Tennessee (AP-2, Coaches-1)
- Nic Scourton, Texas A&M (AP-2, Coaches-1)
- Landon Jackson, Arkansas (AP-2, Coaches-2)
- Bradyn Swinson, LSU (Coaches-2)
- R Mason Thomas, Oklahoma (Coaches-2)
- Johnny Walker Jr., Missouri (Coaches-2)
- Mykel Williams, Georgia (Coaches-2)

=== Defensive tackles ===
- Walter Nolen, Ole Miss (AP-1, Coaches-1)
- Alfred Collins, Texas (AP-1)
- T. J. Sanders, South Carolina (AP-2)
- Deone Walker, Kentucky (AP-2)

=== Linebackers ===
- Danny Stutsman, Oklahoma (AP-1, Coaches-1)
- Whit Weeks, LSU (AP-1, Coaches-1)
- Anthony Hill Jr., Texas (AP-1, Coaches-2)
- Jihaad Campbell, Alabama (AP-2, Coaches-1)
- Chris "Pooh" Paul Jr., Ole Miss (AP-2, Coaches-2)
- Jalon Walker, Georgia (AP-2, Coaches-2)

=== Defensive backs ===
- Nick Emmanwori, South Carolina (AP-1, Coaches-1)
- Jahdae Barron, Texas (AP-1, Coaches-1)
- Malaki Starks, Georgia (AP-1, Coaches-2)
- Jermod McCoy, Tennessee (AP-1, Coaches-2)
- Trey Amos, Ole Miss (AP-2, Coaches-1)
- Malachi Moore, Alabama (AP-2, Coaches-1)
- Maxwell Hairston, Kentucky (AP-2)
- Andrew Mukuba, Texas (AP-2)
- Will Lee III, Texas A&M (Coaches-2)
- Isaac Smith, Mississippi State (Coaches-2)

== Special teams ==
=== Kickers ===
- Alex Raynor, Kentucky (AP-1, Coaches-2)
- Peyton Woodring, Georgia (AP-2, Coaches-2)

=== Punters ===
- Jesse Mirco, Vanderbilt (AP-1, Coaches-2)
- Kai Kroeger, South Carolina (Coaches-1)
- Brett Thorson, Georgia (AP-2)

=== All purpose/return specialist ===
- Barion Brown, Kentucky (AP-1, Coaches-1)
- Dylan Sampson (Coaches-1)
- Davon Booth, Mississippi State (AP-2)
- Martel Hight, Vanderbilt (Coaches-2)

== Key ==
Bold = Consensus first-team selection by both the coaches and AP

AP = Associated Press

Coaches = Selected by the SEC coaches

== See also ==
- 2024 Southeastern Conference football season
- 2024 College Football All-America Team
- Southeastern Conference football individual awards
