= Tyreak Sapp =

American football player (born 2002)

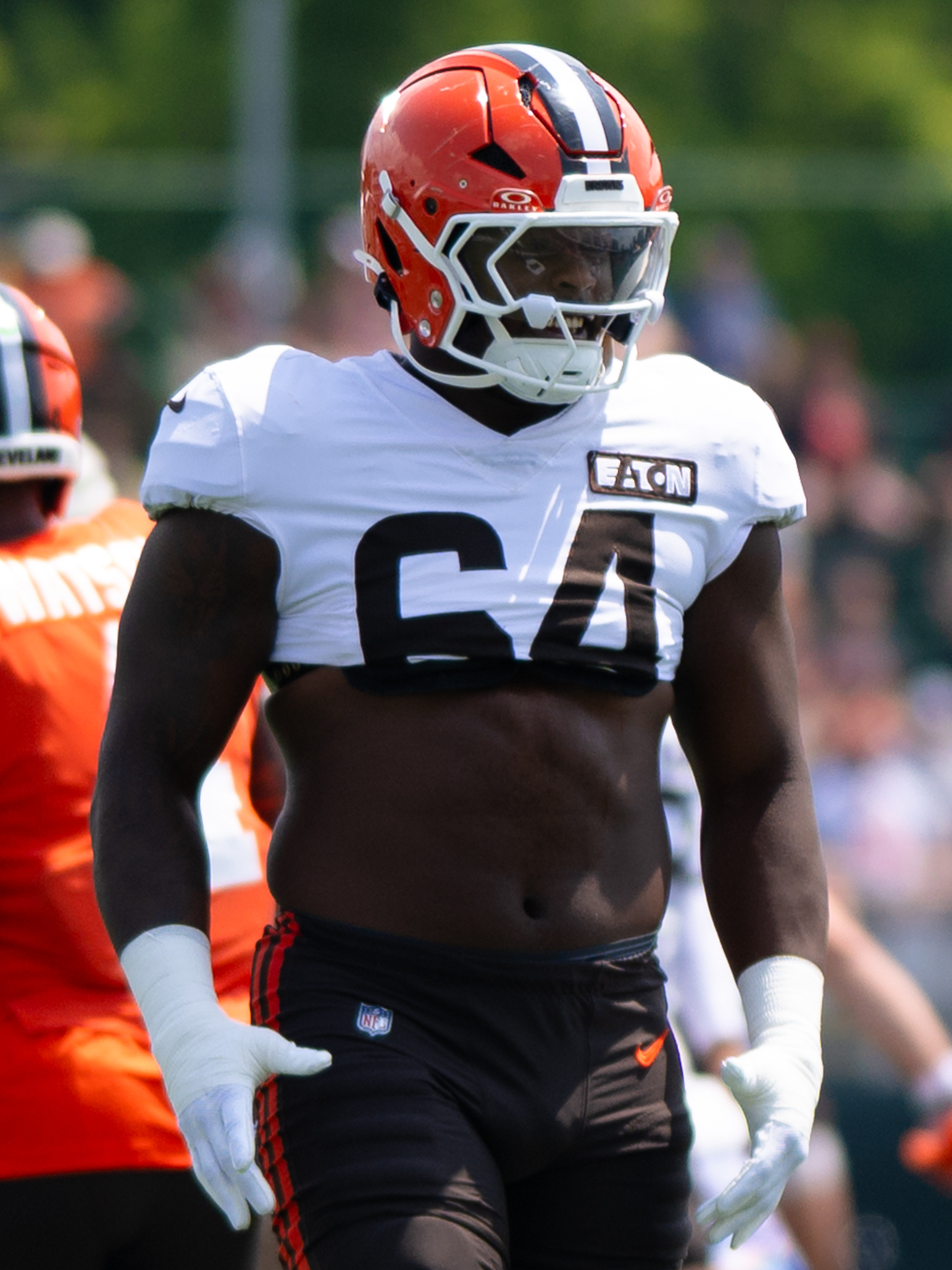
- Sapp with the Cleveland Browns in 2026

Rhode Island Breakers
- Position: Defensive end
- Roster status: Unsigned draft pick

Personal information
- Born: October 5, 2002 (age 24); Fort Lauderdale, Florida, U.S.
- Listed height: 6 ft 2 in (1.88 m)
- Listed weight: 273 lb (124 kg)

Career information
- High school: St. Thomas Aquinas (Fort Lauderdale)
- College: Florida (2021–2025)
- NFL draft: 2026: undrafted

Career history
- Cleveland Browns (2026)*; Rhode Island Breakers (2027-present)
- * Offseason or practice squad member only
- Stats at Pro Football Reference

Tyreak Sapp (born October 5, 2002) is an American professional football defensive end for the Rhode Island Breakers. Sapp played college football for the Florida Gators.

== Early life ==
Sapp attended St. Thomas Aquinas High School in Fort Lauderdale, Florida, where he notched over 100 tackles, 21.5 sacks, and five fumble recoveries. Coming out of high school, Sapp was rated as a four-star recruit and held offers from schools such as Alabama, Florida, Georgia Tech, Miami, and Ohio State. Sapp committed to play college football for the Florida Gators.

== College career ==
Sapp took a redshirt season in 2021. In 2022, he appeared in 13 games, notching 20 tackles with half a tackle being for a loss. In week one of the 2023 season, Sapp got his first career start versus Utah, where he notched three tackles. He finished the season with 24 tackles with five being for a loss, two sacks, and two forced fumbles.

== Professional career ==
Pre-draft measurables
Height	Weight	Arm length	Hand span	Wingspan	Bench press
6 ft 2 3/8 in (1.89 m)	273 lb (124 kg)	32 in (0.81 m)	9 1/2 in (0.24 m)	6 ft 4 1/2 in (1.94 m)	28 reps
All values from NFL Combine

On May 8, 2026, Sapp signed with the Cleveland Browns as an undrafted free agent. On August 30, Sapp was waived by Cleveland as a part of final roster cuts; he was re-signed to the team's practice squad the following day. He was released by the Browns on September 11.

=== Rhode Island Breakers ===
On November 19, 2026, Sapp was selected by the Rhode Island Breakers in the 2027 UFL Draft.
