= Tyler Baron =

American football player (born 2001)

No. 94 – New York Jets
- Position: Defensive end
- Roster status: Physically unable to perform

Personal information
- Born: October 22, 2001 (age 25); Knoxville, Tennessee, U.S.
- Listed height: 6 ft 4 in (1.93 m)
- Listed weight: 258 lb (117 kg)

Career information
- High school: Knoxville Catholic
- College: Tennessee (2020–2023); Miami (FL) (2024)
- NFL draft: 2025: 5th round, 176th overall pick

Career history
- New York Jets (2025–present)

Career NFL statistics as of 2025
- Tackles: 9
- Stats at Pro Football Reference

Tyler Patrick Baron (born October 22, 2001) is an American professional football defensive end for the New York Jets of the National Football League (NFL). He played college football for the Tennessee Volunteers and Miami Hurricanes. Baron was selected by the Jets in the fifth round of the 2025 NFL draft.

== Early life ==
Baron attended The Ensworth School in Nashville, Tennessee, before transferring to Knoxville Catholic High School in Knoxville, Tennessee, for his senior year. As a senior, he had 105 tackles and nine sacks. He committed to the University of Tennessee to play college football.

== College career ==
=== Tennessee ===
As a true freshman at Tennessee, Baron played in all 10 games and had 21 tackles and one sack. As a sophomore in 2021, he started five of 13 games, recording 30 tackles and four sacks. Baron started three of 13 games in 2022 and had 22 tackles and 2.5 sacks. He returned to Tennessee for his senior season in 2023. On December 8, 2023, Baron entered the NCAA transfer portal.

=== Miami (FL) ===
On December 16, 2023, Baron announced that he would be transferring to Ole Miss. On January 16, 2024, Baron flipped his commitment from Ole Miss to Louisville. On May 21, 2024, Baron once again flipped his commitment from Louisville to Miami (FL).

== Professional career ==
Pre-draft measurables
Height	Weight	Arm length	Hand span	Wingspan	40-yard dash	10-yard split	20-yard split	20-yard shuttle	Three-cone drill	Vertical jump	Broad jump	Bench press
6 ft 4 5/8 in (1.95 m)	258 lb (117 kg)	33 1/8 in (0.84 m)	10 in (0.25 m)	6 ft 8 1/4 in (2.04 m)	4.62 s	1.61 s	2.69 s	4.53 s	7.41 s	35.5 in (0.90 m)	10 ft 1 in (3.07 m)	19 reps
All values from NFL Combine/Pro Day

Baron was selected by the New York Jets in the fifth round, 176th overall, in the 2025 NFL draft. He made six appearances for the Jets during his rookie campaign, recording nine combined tackles. On December 10, 2025, Baron was placed on season-ending injured reserve due to a knee injury suffered in Week 14 against the Miami Dolphins.

Baron began the 2026 season on the PUP list due to the knee injury.

== NFL career statistics ==
=== Regular season ===
Year	Team	Games		Tackles					Interceptions						Fumbles				
Year	Team	GP	GS	Cmb	Solo	Ast	Sck	TFL	Int	Yds	Avg	Lng	TD	PD	FF	Fum	FR	Yds	TD
2025	NYJ	6	0	9	5	4	0.0	1	0	0	0.0	0	0	0	0	0	0	0	0
Career		6	0	9	5	4	0.0	1	0	0	0.0	0	0	0	0	0	0	0	0
