= Xavian Sorey =

American football player (born 2002)

Colorado Stampede
- Position: Linebacker
- Roster status: Unsigned draft pick

Personal information
- Born: April 7, 2002 (age 24)
- Listed height: 6 ft 2 in (1.88 m)
- Listed weight: 228 lb (103 kg)

Career information
- High school: IMG Academy (Bradenton, Florida)
- College: Georgia (2021–2023); Arkansas (2024–2025)
- NFL draft: 2026: undrafted

Career history
- Las Vegas Raiders (2026)*; Colorado Stampede (2027-present)
- * Offseason or practice squad member only

Awards and highlights
- 2× CFP national champion (2021, 2022)
- Stats at Pro Football Reference

Xavian Demetrius Sorey Jr. (born April 7, 2002) is an American professional football linebacker. He played college football for the Arkansas Razorbacks and Georgia Bulldogs.

== Early life ==
Sorey spent his first three seasons at Graceville High School before transferring to IMG Academy for his senior season. During his junior year, he ran for 638 yards and three touchdowns and hauled in four passes for 110 yards and two touchdowns, while notching 57 tackles, three interceptions, and three defensive touchdowns. Coming out of high school, Sorey was rated as a five-star recruit and the 20th overall player in the class of 2021. He committed to play college football for the Georgia Bulldogs over offers from school such as Miami, LSU, Ole Miss, Florida State, Clemson, Alabama, and Auburn.

== College career ==
=== Georgia ===
During his three-year career with the Bulldogs from 2021 through 2023, Sorey appeared in 27 games with two starts, where he totaled 24 tackles with two and a half being for a loss, a sack, a pass deflection, an interception, and two fumble recoveries. After the 2023 season, he entered his name into the NCAA transfer portal.

=== Arkansas ===
Sorey transferred to play for the Arkansas Razorbacks. In week 2 of the 2024 season, he notched 13 tackles versus Oklahoma State. Sorey finished the 2024 season with 99 tackles with ten being for a loss, two sacks, two pass deflections, and an interception.

== Professional career ==
Pre-draft measurables
| Height | Weight | Arm length | Hand span | Wingspan | 40-yard dash | 10-yard split | 20-yard split | 20-yard shuttle | Three-cone drill | Vertical jump | Broad jump | Bench press |
|---|---|---|---|---|---|---|---|---|---|---|---|---|
| 6 ft 2 in (1.88 m) | 228 lb (103 kg) | 31 5/8 in (0.80 m) | 9 3/4 in (0.25 m) | 6 ft 5 5/8 in (1.97 m) | 4.63 s | 1.66 s | 2.71 s | 4.42 s | 7.00 s | 37.5 in (0.95 m) | 10 ft 0 in (3.05 m) | 16 reps |
All values from NFL Combine/Pro Day

Sorey signed with the Las Vegas Raiders as an undrafted free agent on April 30, 2026. He was waived by Las Vegas as a part of final roster cuts on August 30.
