= 2022 college football recruiting class =

Recruiting of students for US college football

The college football recruiting class of 2022 refers to the recruiting of high school athletes to play college football starting in the fall of 2022. The scope of this article covers: (a) the colleges and universities with recruiting classes ranking among the top 20 in the country as assessed by at least one of the major media outlets, and (b) the individual recruits ranking among the top 20 in the country as assessed by at least one of the major media outlets.

The Texas A&M Aggies, led by head coach Jimbo Fisher, had the top recruiting class, being ranked No. 1 by 247Sports, Rivals.com, and On3. Six Texas A&M recruits were rated in the top 10 by one or more of the rating agencies. Texas A&M's 2022 class is rated as the best in the history of recruiting rankings.

Alabama, Georgia, Ohio State, and Texas were ranked second through fifth by all three raters.

Defensive tackle Walter Nolen and cornerback Travis Hunter were the top two recruits, as rated by ESPN.com, 247Sports, Rivals.com, and USA Today.

== Top ranked classes ==
School	247	Rivals	On3
Texas A&M	1	1	1
Alabama	2	2	2
Georgia	3	3	3
Ohio State	4	4	4
Texas	5	5	5
Penn State	6	7	7
Notre Dame	7	6	6
Oklahoma	8	8	8
Michigan	9	9	9
Clemson	10	10	14
North Carolina	11	11	10
LSU	12	15	13
Oregon	13	24	12
Kentucky	14	14	18
Miami	15	31	11
Missouri	16	12	15
Florida	17	20	20
Tennessee	18	13	16
Stanford	19	25	21
Florida State	20	17	19
Auburn	21	18	17
Indiana	25	19	29
Mississippi State	26	16	22

== Top ranked recruits ==
The following individuals were rated by one of the major media outlets among the top 20 players in the country in the Class of 2022. They are listed in order of their highest ranking by any of the major media outlets.

Player	Position	School	ESPN	Rivals	247Sports	USA Today
Walter Nolen	Defensive tackle	Texas A&M	1	2	2	1
Travis Hunter	Cornerback	Jackson State	2	1	1	2
Gabe Brownlow-Dindy	Defensive tackle	Texas A&M	3	55	11	15
Cade Klubnik	Quarterback	Clemson	29	3	13	32
Domani Jackson	Cornerback	USC	9	17	15	3
Evan Stewart	Wide receiver	Texas A&M	13	33	6	3
Drew Allar	Quarterback	Penn State	51	70	3	99
Luther Burden III	Wide receiver	Missouri	5	4	14	4
Harold Perkins	Linebacker	LSU	4	34	5	18
Malaki Starks	Athlete	Georgia	12	62	4	29
Will Johnson	Cornerback	Michigan	23	5	35	11
Lebbeus Overton	Defensive end	Texas A&M	6	32	17	
Jeremiah Alexander	Defensive end	Alabama	19	6	50	13
Travis Shaw	Defensive tackle	North Carolina	62	15	12	6
Shemar Stewart	Defensive end	Texas A&M	7	30	9	12
Dani Dennis-Sutton	Defensive end	Penn State	80	7	28	39
Mykel Williams	Defensive tackle	Georgia	24	8	7	31
Jaheim Singletary	Cornerback	Georgia	21	10	67	7
Zach Rice	Offensive tackle	North Carolina	8	24	20	9
Josh Conerly Jr.	Offensive tackle	Oregon	31	31	8	24
Denver Harris	Cornerback	Texas A&M	25	21	45	8
Bear Alexander	Defensive tackle	Georgia	56	9	111	18
Devon Campbell	Offensive guard	Texas	10	14	23	10
C. J. Hicks	Linebacker	Ohio State	17	18	10	14
Tyler Booker	Offensive guard	Alabama	11	111	60	
Alex "Sonny" Styles	Safety	Ohio State	15	11	27	
Tetairoa McMillan	Wide receiver	Arizona	145	12	37	78
Marvin Jones Jr.	Defensive end	Georgia	65	13	21	55
Will Campbell	Offensive tackle	LSU	14	54	66	22
Walker Howard	Quarterback	LSU	42	20	91	15
Shazz Preston	Wide receiver	Alabama	16	45	120	41
Quency Wiggins	Defensive end	LSU	202	16	48	
Jihaad Campbell	Edge	Alabama	41	29	16	
Kelvin Banks Jr.	Offensive tackle	Texas				17
Kamari Wilson	Safety	Florida	18	60	74	20
Daylen Everette	Cornerback	Georgia	47	42	18	44
Xavier Nwankpa	Safety	Iowa	156	19	25	66
Nick Singleton	Running back	Penn State	57	43	19	92
Derrick Moore	Defensive end	Michigan	20	52	94	84
