= Nathaniel Watson =

American football player (born 2000)

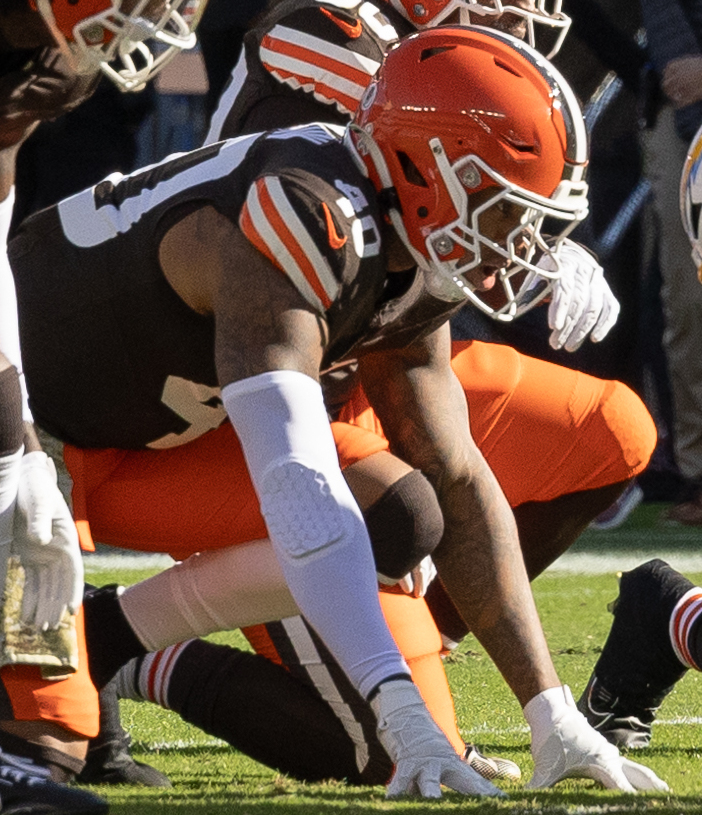
- Watson with the Cleveland Browns in 2024

No. 40 – Cleveland Browns
- Position: Linebacker
- Roster status: Practice squad

Personal information
- Born: September 1, 2000 (age 26); Maplesville, Alabama, U.S.
- Listed height: 6 ft 0 in (1.83 m)
- Listed weight: 233 lb (106 kg)

Career information
- High school: Maplesville
- College: Mississippi State (2018–2023)
- NFL draft: 2024: 6th round, 206th overall pick

Career history
- Cleveland Browns (2024–present)

Awards and highlights
- SEC Defensive Player of the Year (2023); First-team All-SEC (2023); Second-team All-SEC (2022)

Career NFL statistics as of 2025
- Total tackles: 14
- Pass deflections: 1
- Stats at Pro Football Reference

Nathaniel “Bookie” Watson Jr. (born September 1, 2000) is an American professional football linebacker for the Cleveland Browns of the National Football League (NFL). He played college football for the Mississippi State Bulldogs.

== Early life ==
Watson grew up in Maplesville, Alabama and attended Maplesville High School. In his high school career, he played at receiver and linebacker. At receiver he caught 45 passes for 1,070 yards and 12 touchdowns, while also adding 376 yards and five touchdowns. At linebacker he racked up 70 tackles and four interceptions, returning two of them for touchdowns. Watson committed to play college football at Mississippi State over schools such as Auburn and Ole Miss.

== College career ==
Watson played sparingly in his first two seasons at Mississippi State in 2018 and 2019, recording a combined five tackles, with one going for loss. In the 2020 season, he tallied 39 tackles with three being for a loss, and a pass deflection. In week seven of the 2021 season, Watson had a breakout game posting 16 tackles with one going for a loss, and a sack, though the Bulldogs lost to #5 Alabama 49–9. He finished the 2021 season with 83 tackles with six going for a loss, five sacks, and a pass deflection. Watson recorded his first interception in week two of the 2022 season, picking off Jayden de Laura and returning it 51 yards, as he helped Mississippi State beat Arizona. In week five, Watson had a forced fumble in the redzone in the second quarter, but was later ejected in the second half on a controversial targeting call on quarterback Max Johnson, though the Bulldogs beat Texas A&M 42–24. Watson finished his breakout 2022 season with 133 tackles with 12 being for a loss, six sacks, a pass deflection, an interception, and a forced fumble. For his performance, Watson was named second team all-SEC. Watson was named preseason second-team all-SEC ahead of the 2023 season. Watson was also named a preseason fourth team all-American by Athlon Sports. Watson was also named to multiple award watch lists, such as for the Lombardi Award and the Bednarik Award.

== Professional career ==
Pre-draft measurables
Height	Weight	Arm length	Hand span	Wingspan	40-yard dash	10-yard split	20-yard split	20-yard shuttle	Three-cone drill	Vertical jump	Broad jump	Bench press
6 ft 2 1/4 in (1.89 m)	233 lb (106 kg)	32 7/8 in (0.84 m)	9 7/8 in (0.25 m)	6 ft 9 in (2.06 m)	4.63 s	1.59 s	2.70 s	4.44 s	7.34 s	31.0 in (0.79 m)	9 ft 3 in (2.82 m)	16 reps
All values from NFL Combine/Pro Day

Watson was drafted by the Cleveland Browns in the sixth round with the 206th overall pick in the 2024 NFL draft. He was waived on September 19, 2024, and re-signed to the practice squad. He was promoted to the active roster on October 2.

On August 21, 2025, Watson was placed on injured reserve, ending his 2025 season.

On August 30, 2026, Watson was waived by the Browns as a part of final roster cuts; he was re-signed to the team's practice squad the following day. On September 12, Watson was elevated from the practice squad.

== Personal life ==
Watson's uncle Harold Morrow played in the NFL as a fullback from 1996 to 2005. His great uncle is Tommie Agee, who played in the NFL as a running back from 1988 to 1994, and won Super Bowls XXVII and XXVIII with the Dallas Cowboys.

On August 15, 2023, Watson was arrested by the Mississippi State University Police Department on suspicion of driving under the influence.
