= 2022 Texas A&M Aggies football team =

American college football season

2022 Texas A&M Aggies football
- Conference: Southeastern Conference
- Western Division
- Record: 5–7 (2–6 SEC)
- Head coach: Jimbo Fisher (5th season)
- Offensive coordinator: Darrell Dickey (5th season)
- Co-offensive coordinator: James Coley (1st season)
- Offensive scheme: Pro-style
- Defensive coordinator: D. J. Durkin (1st season)
- Co-defensive coordinator: Tyler Santucci (1st season)
- Base defense: 4–3
- Home stadium: Kyle Field

2022 Southeastern Conference football standings
	Conf.			Overall
Team	W		L	W		L
Eastern Division
No. 1 Georgia xy$#^	8	–	0	15	–	0
No. 6 Tennessee	6	–	2	11	–	2
No. 23 South Carolina	4	–	4	8	–	5
Kentucky	3	–	5	7	–	6
Florida	3	–	5	6	–	7
Missouri	3	–	5	6	–	7
Vanderbilt	2	–	6	5	–	7
Western Division
No. 16 LSU xy	6	–	2	10	–	4
No. 5 Alabama x	6	–	2	11	–	2
No. 20 Mississippi State	4	–	4	9	–	4
Ole Miss	4	–	4	8	–	5
Arkansas	3	–	5	7	–	6
Auburn	2	–	6	5	–	7
Texas A&M	2	–	6	5	–	7
Championship: Georgia 50, LSU 30
# – College Football Playoff champion; ^ – College Football Playoff participant; $ – Conference champion; x – Division champion/co-champions; y – Championship game participant; Rankings from AP Poll

The 2022 Texas A&M Aggies football team represented Texas A&M University in the 2022 NCAA Division I FBS football season. The Aggies played their home games at Kyle Field in College Station, Texas, and competed in the Western Division of the Southeastern Conference (SEC). They were led by fifth-year head coach Jimbo Fisher.

The Aggies finished the season 5–7, 2–6 in SEC play to finish last in the conference's West Division. This was the Aggies' first losing season since 2009 and the first season the program failed to qualify for a bowl game since 2008. On November 28, the university announced that offensive coordinator Darrell Dickey had been fired. The Aggies finished the season with the 12th ranked offense in the SEC and 101st in FBS, averaging 22.8 points per game.

The Texas A&M Aggies football team drew an average home attendance of 97,213 in 2022, the 8th highest of all college football teams.

== Offseason ==
=== Position key ===
Back	B	Center	C	Cornerback	CB	Defensive back	DB
Defensive end	DE	Defensive lineman	DL	Defensive tackle	DT	End	E
Fullback	FB	Guard	G	Halfback	HB	Kicker	K
Kickoff returner	KR	Offensive tackle	OT	Offensive lineman	OL	Linebacker	LB
Long snapper	LS	Punter	P	Punt returner	PR	Quarterback	QB
Running back	RB	Safety	S	Tight end	TE	Wide receiver	WR

=== Players departures ===
==== Outgoing transfers ====
Name	No.	Pos.	Height	Weight	Year	Hometown	Prev. school
Zach Calzada	#10	QB	6 ft 4 in (1.93 m)	225 pounds (102 kg)	Sophomore	Lanier, GA	Transferred to Auburn
Antonio Doyle Jr.	#22	LB	6 ft 3 in (1.91 m)	235 pounds (107 kg)	Sophomore	St. Louis, MO	Transferred to Jackson State
Dreyden Norwood	#31	CB	6 ft 0 in (1.83 m)	180 pounds (82 kg)	Freshman	Fort Smith, AR	Transferred to Missouri
Deondre Jackson	#25	RB	6 ft 0 in (1.83 m)	220 pounds (100 kg)	(redshirt) Freshman	Stone Mountain, GA	Transferred to Oklahoma State
Darvon Hubbard	#21	RB	6 ft 0 in (1.83 m)	210 pounds (95 kg)	(redshirt) Freshman	Surprise, AZ	Transferred to Temple
RJ Orebo	#41	DL	6 ft 7 in (2.01 m)	275 pounds (125 kg)	(redshirt) Sophomore	Dayton, TX	Transferred to Southern Illinois
Daniel Bushland	#29	WR	6 ft 0 in (1.83 m)	195 pounds (88 kg)	Senior	Austin, TX	Undecided
Erick Young	#4	DB	6 ft 1 in (1.85 m)	205 pounds (93 kg)	Junior	Richmond, TX	Transferred to Blinn College
Demond Demas	#1	WR	6 ft 3 in (1.91 m)	180 pounds (82 kg)	(redshirt) Freshman	Tomball, TX	Undecided
Baylor Cupp	#88	TE	6 ft 7 in (2.01 m)	245 pounds (111 kg)	(redshirt) Sophomore	Brock, TX	Transferred to Texas Tech
Caleb Chapman	#81	WR	6 ft 5 in (1.96 m)	200 pounds (91 kg)	(redshirt) Junior	Friendswood, TX	Transferred to Oregon
Derick Hunter Jr.	#65	OL	6 ft 4 in (1.93 m)	305 pounds (138 kg)	(redshirt) Sophomore	Fort Myers, FL	Undecided
Jahzion Harris	#37	DL	6 ft 4 in (1.93 m)	220 pounds (100 kg)	Freshman	Brooklyn, NY	Undecided

† Elected to use the extra year of eligibility granted by the NCAA in response to COVID-19.

==== 2022 NFL draft ====
The following Aggies players were selected in the NFL draft.

Player	Position	Team	Round	Pick
Kenyon Green	G	Houston Texans	1	15
DeMarvin Leal	DE	Pittsburgh Steelers	3	84
Micheal Clemons	DE	New York Jets	4	117
Isaiah Spiller	RB	Los Angeles Chargers	4	123

=== Additions ===
==== Incoming transfers ====
Name	No.	Pos.	Height	Weight	Year	Hometown	Prev. school
Max Johnson	#14	QB	6 ft 5 in (1.96 m)	229 pounds (104 kg)	Sophomore	Irvine, CA	LSU
Micaiah Overton		DL	6 ft 3 in (1.91 m)	300 pounds (140 kg)	(redshirt) Junior	Tuscaloosa, AL	Liberty

==== Recruiting class ====
College recruiting
Name	Hometown	School	Height	Weight	Commit date
Walter Nolen; DT	Powell, TN	Powell High School	6 ft 4 in (1.93 m)	325 lb (147 kg)	Nov 6, 2021
Walter Nolen; DT	Recruit ratings: Rivals: 247Sports: ESPN: (95)				
Gabe Brownlow-Dindy; DT	Lakeland, FL	Lakeland High School	6 ft 3 in (1.91 m)	280 lb (130 kg)	Dec 6, 2021
Gabe Brownlow-Dindy; DT	Recruit ratings: Rivals: 247Sports: ESPN: (92)				
Shemar Stewart; DE	Miami, FL	Monsignor Edward Pace High School	6 ft 5 in (1.96 m)	255 lb (116 kg)	Feb 2, 2022
Shemar Stewart; DE	Recruit ratings: Rivals: 247Sports: ESPN: (92)				
Evan Stewart; WR	Frisco, TX	Liberty High School	6 ft 0 in (1.83 m)	175 lb (79 kg)	Nov 29, 2021
Evan Stewart; WR	Recruit ratings: Rivals: 247Sports: ESPN: (90)				
Chris Marshall; WR	Missouri City, TX	Thurgood Marshall High School	6 ft 3 in (1.91 m)	195 lb (88 kg)	Nov 6, 2021
Chris Marshall; WR	Recruit ratings: Rivals: 247Sports: ESPN: (89)				
Denver Harris; CB	Houston, TX	North Shore High School	6 ft 1 in (1.85 m)	185 lb (84 kg)	Dec 18, 2021
Denver Harris; CB	Recruit ratings: Rivals: 247Sports: ESPN: (87)				
Conner Weigman; QB	Cypress, TX	Bridgeland High School	6 ft 2 in (1.88 m)	205 lb (93 kg)	Feb 4, 2021
Conner Weigman; QB	Recruit ratings: Rivals: 247Sports: ESPN: (87)				
Enai White; DE	Philadelphia, PA	Imhotep High School	6 ft 5 in (1.96 m)	225 lb (102 kg)	Dec 15, 2021
Enai White; DE	Recruit ratings: Rivals: 247Sports: ESPN: (87)				
Le'Veon Moss; RB	Baton Rouge, LA	Istrouma High School	6 ft 0 in (1.83 m)	190 lb (86 kg)	Jan 16, 2021
Le'Veon Moss; RB	Recruit ratings: Rivals: 247Sports: ESPN: (86)				
P. J. Williams; OT	Dickinson, TX	Dickinson High School	6 ft 4 in (1.93 m)	250 lb (110 kg)	Jan 21, 2021
P. J. Williams; OT	Recruit ratings: Rivals: 247Sports: ESPN: (86)				
Bryce Anderson; S	Beamount, TX	West Brook High School	6 ft 0 in (1.83 m)	190 lb (86 kg)	Aug 6, 2021
Bryce Anderson; S	Recruit ratings: Rivals: 247Sports: ESPN: (86)				
Jacoby Matthews; S	Ponchatoula, LA	Ponchatoula High School	6 ft 2 in (1.88 m)	210 lb (95 kg)	Feb 2, 2022
Jacoby Matthews; S	Recruit ratings: Rivals: 247Sports: ESPN: (86)				
Malick Sylla; DE	Katy, TX	Katy High School	6 ft 5 in (1.96 m)	225 lb (102 kg)	Jan 17, 2021
Malick Sylla; DE	Recruit ratings: Rivals: 247Sports: ESPN: (85)				
Deyon Bouie; ATH	Bainbridge, GA	Bainbridge High School	5 ft 11 in (1.80 m)	165 lb (75 kg)	Aug 13, 2021
Deyon Bouie; ATH	Recruit ratings: Rivals: 247Sports: ESPN: (85)				
Kam Dewberry; OT	Humble, TX	Atascocita High School	6 ft 4 in (1.93 m)	315 lb (143 kg)	Dec 15, 2021
Kam Dewberry; OT	Recruit ratings: Rivals: 247Sports: ESPN: (84)				
Jake Johnson; TE	Watkinsville, GA	Oconee County High School	6 ft 5 in (1.96 m)	210 lb (95 kg)	Dec 15, 2021
Jake Johnson; TE	Recruit ratings: Rivals: 247Sports: ESPN: (84)				
Donovan Green; TE	Dickinson, TX	Dickinson High School	6 ft 4 in (1.93 m)	225 lb (102 kg)	Jan 21, 2021
Donovan Green; TE	Recruit ratings: Rivals: 247Sports: ESPN: (84)				
Theodor Melin Ohrstrom; TE	Stockholm, SW	RIG Football Academy	6 ft 6 in (1.98 m)	240 lb (110 kg)	Aug 18, 2021
Theodor Melin Ohrstrom; TE	Recruit ratings: Rivals: 247Sports: ESPN: (83)				
Anthony Lucas; DT	Scottsdale, AZ	Chaparral High School	6 ft 5 in (1.96 m)	290 lb (130 kg)	Dec 15, 2021
Anthony Lucas; DT	Recruit ratings: Rivals: 247Sports: ESPN: (83)				
Marquis Groves-Killebrew; CB	Kennesaw, GA	North Cobb High School	6 ft 0 in (1.83 m)	180 lb (82 kg)	Dec 15, 2021
Marquis Groves-Killebrew; CB	Recruit ratings: Rivals: 247Sports: ESPN: (83)				
Bobby Taylor; CB	Katy, TX	Katy High School	6 ft 1 in (1.85 m)	175 lb (79 kg)	Feb 10, 2021
Bobby Taylor; CB	Recruit ratings: Rivals: 247Sports: ESPN: (81)				
Jarred Kerr; ATH	Lexington, TX	Lexington High School	6 ft 0 in (1.83 m)	180 lb (82 kg)	Jun 24, 2021
Jarred Kerr; ATH	Recruit ratings: Rivals: 247Sports: ESPN: (81)				
Martell Harris; LB	The Woodlands, TX	The Woodlands High School	6 ft 2 in (1.88 m)	205 lb (93 kg)	Jun 20, 2021
Martell Harris; LB	Recruit ratings: Rivals: 247Sports: ESPN: (80)				
Hunter Erb; OG	Fort Worth, TX	V.R. Eaton High School	6 ft 7 in (2.01 m)	305 lb (138 kg)	Feb 6, 2021
Hunter Erb; OG	Recruit ratings: Rivals: 247Sports: ESPN: (80)				
Jadon Scarlett; DT	Dallas, TX	Coram Deo Academy	6 ft 3 in (1.91 m)	260 lb (120 kg)	Jun 26, 2021
Jadon Scarlett; DT	Recruit ratings: Rivals: 247Sports: ESPN: (80)				
Noah Thomas; WR	League City, TX	Clear Springs High School	6 ft 5 in (1.96 m)	185 lb (84 kg)	Feb 17, 2021
Noah Thomas; WR	Recruit ratings: Rivals: 247Sports: ESPN: (79)				
Ish Harris; ATH	Pilot Point, TX	Pilot Point High School	6 ft 3 in (1.91 m)	190 lb (86 kg)	Jun 26, 2021
Ish Harris; ATH	Recruit ratings: Rivals: 247Sports: ESPN: (79)				
Mark Nabou; OG	Seattle, WA	O'Dea High School	6 ft 4 in (1.93 m)	310 lb (140 kg)	Dec 6, 2021
Mark Nabou; OG	Recruit ratings: Rivals: 247Sports: ESPN: (79)				
Ethan Moczulski; K	Mead, WA	Mount Spokane High School	5 ft 11 in (1.80 m)	180 lb (82 kg)	Jul 7, 2021
Ethan Moczulski; K	Recruit ratings: Rivals: 247Sports: ESPN: (76)				

*= 247Sports Composite rating; ratings are out of 1.00. (five stars= 1.00–.98, four stars= .97–.90, three stars= .80–.89, two stars= .79–.70, no stars= <70)
Δ= Left the Texas A&M program following signing but prior to the 2022 season.

==== Overall class rankings ====
Website	National rank	Conference rank	5 star recruits	4 star recruits	3 star recruits	2 star recruits	1 star recruits	No star ranking
ESPN	#1	#1	4	20	3	0	0	0
On3 Recruits	#1	#1	7	20	1	0	0	0
Rivals	#1	#1	4	20	4	0	0	0
247 Sports	#1	#1	6	19	3	0	0	0

== Preseason ==
=== SEC media days ===
The 2022 SEC Media days were held in July 2022. The Preseason Polls were released in July 2022. Each team had their head coach available to talk to the media at the event. Coverage of the event was televised on SEC Network and ESPN.

Media poll (West Division)
Predicted finish	Team	Votes (1st place)
1	Alabama	177
2	Texas A&M	3
3	Arkansas	1
4	Ole Miss	
5	LSU	
6	Mississippi State	
7	Auburn	

Media poll (SEC Championship)
Rank	Team	Votes
1	Alabama	158
2	Georgia	18
3	South Carolina	3

=== Preseason All-SEC teams (media) ===
First Team

Position	Player	Class	Team
First Team Special Teams
P	Nik Constantinou	RS Junior	Texas A&M

Second Team

Position	Player	Class	Team
Second Team Offense
RB	De’Von Achane	Junior	Texas A&M
OL	Layden Robinson	RS Junior	Texas A&M
Second Team Defense
DB	Antonio Johnson	Junior	Texas A&M
Second Team Special Teams
RS	Ainias Smith	Senior	Texas A&M
AP	De’Von Achane	Junior	Texas A&M

Third Team

Position	Player	Class	Team
Third Team Offense
WR	Ainias Smith	Senior	Texas A&M
Third Team Defense
DL	McKinley Jackson	Junior	Texas A&M
Third Team Special Teams
AP	Ainias Smith	Senior	Texas A&M

== Schedule ==
Texas A&M and the SEC announced the 2022 football schedule on September 21, 2021.

Date	Time	Opponent	Rank	Site	TV	Result	Attendance
September 3	11:00 a.m.	Sam Houston*	No. 6	Kyle Field; College Station, TX	SECN	W 31–0	97,946
September 10	2:30 p.m.	Appalachian State*	No. 6	Kyle Field; College Station, TX	ESPN2	L 14–17	92,664
September 17	8:00 p.m.	No. 13 Miami (FL)*	No. 24	Kyle Field; College Station, TX	ESPN	W 17–9	107,245
September 24	6:00 p.m.	vs. No. 10 Arkansas	No. 23	AT&T Stadium; Arlington, TX (rivalry / SEC Nation)	ESPN	W 23–21	63,580
October 1	3:00 p.m.	at Mississippi State	No. 17	Davis Wade Stadium; Starkville, MS	SECN	L 24–42	51,930
October 8	7:00 p.m.	at No. 1 Alabama		Bryant–Denny Stadium; Tuscaloosa, AL	CBS	L 20–24	100,077
October 22	6:30 p.m.	at South Carolina		Williams–Brice Stadium; Columbia, SC	SECN	L 24–30	77,837
October 29	6:30 p.m.	No. 15 Ole Miss		Kyle Field; College Station, TX	SECN	L 28–31	101,084
November 5	11:00 a.m.	Florida		Kyle Field; College Station, TX	ESPN	L 24–41	97,797
November 12	6:30 p.m.	at Auburn		Jordan–Hare Stadium; Auburn, AL	SECN	L 10–13	87,451
November 19	11:00 a.m.	UMass*		Kyle Field; College Station, TX	ESPN+/SECN+	W 20–3	90,177
November 26	6:00 p.m.	No. 5 LSU		Kyle Field; College Station, TX (rivalry)	ESPN	W 38–23	93,578
*Non-conference game; Rankings from AP Poll (and CFP Rankings, after November 1) - Released prior to game; All times are in Central time

== Personnel ==
=== Roster ===
2022 Texas A&M Aggies Football Roster
Quarterbacks: 13 Haynes King – sophomore (6'3, 205); 14 Max Johnson – junior (6'5, 220); 15 Conner Weigman – freshman (6'2, 215); 17 Eli Stowers – (redshirt) freshman (6'4, 215); 20 Blake Bost – sophomore (6'2, 195); 21 Dallas Novicke – freshman (6'0, 197); 27 Jackson Oksnee – (redshirt) freshman (6'0, 185); Running backs: 4 Amari Daniels – sophomore (5'8, 200); 6 De’Von Achane – junior (5'9, 185); 22 Le'Veon Moss – freshman (5'11, 200); 24 Earnest Crownover – junior (6'3, 230); 25 Anthony Dinota – (redshirt) freshman (6'0, 207); 33 Charles Shelling – junior (5'10, 200); 34 L. J. Johnson Jr. – (redshirt) freshman (5'10, 215); 35 Bladen Reaves – junior (5'11, 195); Fullback: 48 Jacob Graham – sophomore (5'11, 235); Wide receivers: 0 Ainias Smith – senior (5'10, 190); 1 Evan Stewart – freshman (5'11, 170); 2 Chase Lane – junior (6'0, 195); 3 Devin Price – junior (6'3, 200); 5 Jalen Preston – senior (6'2, 220); 7 Moose Muhammad III – sophomore (6'1, 195); 8 Yulkeith Brown – sophomore (5'10, 175); 9 Noah Thomas – freshman (6'5, 195); 10 Chris Marshall – freshman (6'3, 205); 16 Kenyon Jackson – junior (6'6, 195); 23 Jacob Brasher – freshman (6'1, 181); 28 Caleb Surber – (redshirt) freshman (6'0, 175); 31 Andrew Maleski – freshman (5'10, 185); 32 Jaxon Rush – freshman (6'1, 170); 80 Hunter Vivaldi – freshman (5'10, 160); 81 Pierce Turner – freshman (6'3, 195); 83 Ryan Campbell – junior (6'2, 185); Tight ends: 11 Blake Smith – sophomore (6'4, 255); 18 Donovan Green – freshman (6'4, 235); 19 Jake Johnson – freshman (6'5, 235); 42 Max Wright – senior (6'4, 255); 82 Fernando Garza – (6'5, 245); 86 Theo Melin Öhrström – freshman (6'5, 255); 88 Nathan Figueroa – freshman (6'3, 236); Long snappers: 12 Connor Choate – graduate (6'1, 200); 48 Jacob Graham – sophomore (5'11, 235); 49 Connor Able – (redshirt) freshman (6'3, 215); 50 Garrett Townsend – junior (5'11, 230); 51 Levi Hancock – freshman (6'2, 240)	Offensive linemen: 54 Mark Nabou – freshman (6'4, 345); 55 Hunter Erb – freshman (6'6, 330); 56 John Saba – junior (6'2, 335); 57 Luke Williams – (redshirt) freshman (6'6, 290); 59 P. J. Williams – freshman (6'4, 285); 60 Trey Zuhn III – (redshirt) freshman (6'6, 320); 61 Bryce Foster – sophomore (6'5, 325); 62 Zach Rogers – freshman (6'2, 311); 63 Chance Jackson – freshman (6'1, 305); 64 Layden Robinson – junior (6'4, 330); 66 Jordan Spasojevic-Moko – (redshirt) sophomore (6'5, 320); 68 Remington Strickland – (redshirt) freshman (6'4, 300); 70 Josh Bankhead – sophomore (6'5, 305); 72 Owen Jebson – (redshirt) freshman (6'5, 290); 74 Aki Ogunbiyi – sophomore (6'4, 320); 75 Kam Dewberry – freshman (6'4, 330); 76 Reuben Fatheree II – sophomore (6'8, 325); 77 Matthew Wykoff – (redshirt) freshman (6'6, 330); 78 Dametrious Crownover – (redshirt) freshman (6'6, 300); 79 James Bailey – freshman (6'3, 300); 90 Jacob Fitts – sophomore (6'0, 286); Defensive linemen: 4 Shemar Stewart – freshman (6'4, 285); 5 Shemar Turner – sophomore (6'4, 300); 6 Enai White – freshman (6'5, 230); 8 Anthony Lucas – freshman (6'6, 270); 10 Fadil Diggs – sophomore (6'5, 260); 13 Elijah Jeudy – (redshirt) freshman (6'3, 295); 15 Albert Regis – (redshirt) freshman (6'1, 320); 18 L. T. Overton – freshman (6'5, 280); 30 Tunmise Adeleye – (redshirt) freshman (6'4, 290); 34 Isaiah Raikes – junior (6'1, 325); 35 McKinnley Jackson – junior (6'2, 325); 53 Nana Boadi-Owusu – freshman (6'2, 234); 55 Adarious Jones – junior (6'4, 300); 88 Walter Nolen – freshman (6'4, 320); 91 Marcus Burris Jr. – (redshirt) freshman (6'4, 290); 92 Malick Sylla – freshman (6'5, 230); 93 Drew Beltran – sophomore (5'11, 260); 94 Cody Polk – freshman (6'7, 230); 95 Michaiah Overton – junior (6'3, 300); 96 Nathan Jackson – (redshirt) freshman (5'10, 264); 97 Travis Pepin – senior (6'1, 255); 98 Jordan Johnson – junior (6'1, 300); 99 Gabe Brownlow-Dindy – freshman (6'3, 300); Placekickers: 22 Ethan Moczulski – freshman (5'11, 200); 36 Caden Davis – junior (6'3, 200); 38 Alan Guerrieri – junior (6'0, 200); 47 Randy Bond – sophomore (5'10, 190); 94 Drake Bhatia – sophomore (5'7, 150)	Linebackers: 23 Tarian Lee Jr. – junior (6'2, 235); 24 Chris Russell Jr. – senior (6'2, 235); 25 Ish Harris – freshman (6'2, 205); 29 Sam Mathews – senior (6'3, 210); 32 Andre White Jr. – senior (6'3, 235); 40 Martrell Harris Jr. – freshman (6'2, 225); 45 Edgerrin Cooper – sophomore (6'3, 225); 50 Jaxson Slanker – freshman (6'0, 210); 51 Kason Tullos – (redshirt) freshman (6'2, 215); 52 Andrew Merrick – sophomore (6'2, 220); 54 Jalen Waddy – junior (6'0, 225); 57 Tyndall McNamara – freshman (6'1, 215); Defensive backs: 0 Myles Jones – graduate (6'4, 190); 1 Bryce Anderson – freshman (5'11, 195); 2 Denver Harris – freshman (5'11, 175); 3 Smoke Bouie – freshman (5'11, 180); 7 Tyreek Chappell – sophomore (5'11, 185); 9 Bobby Taylor – freshman (6'0, 190); 11 Deuce Harmon – sophomore (5'10, 200); 14 Jacoby Matthews – freshman (6'1, 205); 16 Brian George – senior (6'2, 195); 17 Jaylon Jones – junior (6'2, 205); 19 Marquis Groves-Killebrew – freshman (6'0, 180); 20 Jardin Gilbert – sophomore (6'1, 185); 21 John Moten – sophomore (6'0, 165); 26 Demani Richardson – senior (6'1, 210); 27 Antonio Johnson – junior (6'3, 195); 28 Kyle Walsh – freshman (6'1, 200); 33 Jarred Kerr – freshman (5'11, 175); 38 Will Smoot – junior (5'10, 180); 39 Cade Garcia – (redshirt) junior (5'8, 185); 41 Avery Hughes – sophomore (6'0, 180); 42 Kent Robinson – (redshirt) freshman (5'10, 165); 43 Alex Zettler – senior (6'0, 200); 81 Kyle Fitzgerald – senior (6'4, 195); 87 Keith Steptoe – sophomore (5'11, 190); Punters: 38 Alan Guerrieri – junior (6'0, 200); 95 Nik Constantinou – junior (6'3, 225)

=== Coaching staff ===
Name	Position	Season at Texas A&M
Jimbo Fisher	Head coach	5th
Darrell Dickey	Offensive coordinator and Tight ends coach	5th
James Coley	Wide receivers coach	3rd
Tommie Robinson	Running backs coach	3rd
Dameyune Craig	Quarterbacks coach	5th
Steve Addazio	Offensive line coach	1st
D. J. Durkin	Defensive coordinator and Safeties coach	1st
Elijah Robinson	Assistant head coach, Run game coordinator, and Defensive line coach	5th
Tyler Santucci	Co-defensive coordinator and Linebackers coach	3rd
T. J. Rushing	Defensive backs coach	3rd
Terry Price	Defensive ends coach	11th
Brandon Sanders	Strength and conditioning coach	5th

== Game summaries ==
=== Sam Houston ===
Uniform Combination
Helmet	Jersey	Pants

Sam Houston Bearkats at No. 6 Texas A&M Aggies – Game summary

Quarter	1	2	3	4	Total
Bearkats	0	0	0	0	0
No. 6 Aggies	7	10	7	7	31

at Kyle Field, College Station, Texas

- Date: September 3
- Game time: 11:00 a.m. CDT
- Game weather: Cloudy • Temperature: 81 °F (27 °C) • Wind: N 4 MPH
- Game attendance: 97,946
- Referee: Kyle Olson
- TV announcers (SECN): Dave Neal, Deuce McAllister and Andraya Carter
- Box score, Recap

Game information
First quarter
- TAMU – Yulkeith Brown 66-yard pass from Haynes King (Caden Davis kick), 3:39. Aggies 7–0. Drive: 5 plays, 77 yards, 2:09.

Second quarter

- TAMU – Caden Davis 40-yard field goal, 4:59. Aggies 10–0. Drive: 6 plays, 36 yards, 2:10.
- TAMU – Ainias Smith 63-yard pass from Haynes King (Caden Davis kick), 0:50. Aggies 17–0. Drive: 3 plays, 67 yards, 1:16.

Third quarter

- TAMU – De’Von Achane 1-yard run (Caden Davis kick), 8:52. Aggies 24–0. Drive: 12 plays, 71 yards, 6:08.

Fourth quarter

- TAMU – Ainias Smith 43-yard pass from Haynes King (Caden Davis kick), 11:10. Aggies 31–0. Drive: 9 plays, 89 yards, 4:48.

Statistics

Statistics	SHSU	TAMU
First downs	10	23
Total yards	198	497
Rushing yards	107	110
Passing yards	91	387
Turnovers	2	2
Time of possession	27:16	32:24

Team	Category	Player	Statistics
Sam Houston State	Passing	Jordan Yates	14/25, 91 yards, INT
Sam Houston State	Rushing	Jordan Yates	13 rushes, 63 yards
Sam Houston State	Receiving	Noah Smith	4 receptions, 35 yards
Texas A&M	Passing	Haynes King	20/30, 364 yards, 3 TD, 2 INT
Texas A&M	Rushing	De’Von Achane	18 rushes, 42 yards, TD
Texas A&M	Receiving	Ainias Smith	6 receptions, 164 yards, 2 TD

The game went into a weather delay during halftime that lasted for nearly three hours. The game was suspended around 1:00 p.m. when lightning was reported in the area before a heavy rain started to fall about an hour later. The game resumed at 3:54 p.m.

=== Appalachian State ===
Appalachian State Mountaineers at No. 6 Texas A&M Aggies – Game summary

Quarter	1	2	3	4	Total
Mountaineers	0	7	7	3	17
No. 6 Aggies	0	7	7	0	14

at Kyle Field, College Station, Texas

- Date: September 10
- Game time: 2:30 p.m. CDT
- Game weather: Sunny • Temperature: 86 °F (30 °C)
- Game attendance: 92,664
- Referee: Steve Marlow
- TV announcers (ESPN2): Anish Shroff, Brock Osweiler and Taylor McGregor
- Box score, Recap

Game information
First quarter
- No scoring plays

Second quarter

- APP – Ahmani Marshall 4-yard run (Michael Hughes kick), 14:56. Mountaineers 7–0. Drive: 5 plays, 77 yards, 1:28.
- TAMU – De’Von Achane 26-yard run (Caden Davis kick), 11:38. Tied 7–7. Drive: 7 plays, 75 yards, 3:18.

Third quarter

- APP – Henry Pearson 9-yard pass from Chase Brice (Michael Hughes kick), 2:34. Mountaineers 14–7. Drive: 11 plays, 62 yards, 6:22.
- TAMU – De’Von Achane 95-yard kickoff return (Caden Davis kick), 2:20. Tied 14–14.

Fourth quarter

- APP – Michael Hughes 29-yard field goal, 8:05. Mountaineers 17–14. Drive: 18 plays, 63 yards, 9:15.

Statistics

Statistics	APP	TAMU
First downs	22	9
Total yards	315	186
Rushing yards	181	89
Passing yards	134	97
Turnovers	0	2
Time of possession	41:29	18:31

Team	Category	Player	Statistics
Appalachian State	Passing	Chase Brice	15/30, 134 yards, TD
Appalachian State	Rushing	Camerun Peoples	19 rushes, 112 yards
Appalachian State	Receiving	Dashaun Davis	4 receptions, 39 yards
Texas A&M	Passing	Haynes King	13/20, 97 yards
Texas A&M	Rushing	De’Von Achane	10 rushes, 66 yards, TD
Texas A&M	Receiving	Evan Stewart	5 receptions, 48 yards

=== No. 13 Miami (FL) ===
No. 13 Miami Hurricanes at No. 24 Texas A&M Aggies – Game summary

Quarter	1	2	3	4	Total
No. 13 Hurricanes	3	0	3	3	9
No. 24 Aggies	10	0	7	0	17

at Kyle Field, College Station, Texas

- Date: September 17
- Game time: 8:00 p.m. CDT
- Game weather: Cloudy, 85 °F (29 °C)
- Game attendance: 107,245
- Referee: Jeff Heaser
- TV announcers (ESPN): Chris Fowler, Kirk Herbstreit, Holly Rowe and Todd McShay
- Box score, Recap

Game information
First quarter
- TAMU – Randy Bond 26-yard field goal, 11:32. Aggies 3–0. Drive: 8 plays, 55 yards, 3:28.
- MIA – Andres Borregales 28-yard field goal, 6:34. Tied 3–3. Drive: 12 plays, 65 yards, 4:58.
- TAMU – L. J. Johnson Jr. 1-yard (Randy Bond kick), 3:30. Aggies 10–3. Drive: 3 plays, 28 yards, 1:14.

Second quarter

- No scoring plays

Third quarter

- TAMU – De’Von Achane 25-yard pass from Max Johnson (Randy Bond kick), 10:29. Aggies 17–3. Drive: 4 plays, 76 yards, 1:58.
- MIA – Andres Borregales 22-yard field goal, 4:04. Aggies 17–6. Drive: 12 plays, 71 yards, 6:25.

Fourth quarter

- MIA – Andres Borregales 34-yard field goal, 8:32. Aggies 17–9. Drive: 16 plays, 83 yards, 6:19.

Statistics

Statistics	MIA	TAMU
First downs	27	16
Total yards	392	264
Rushing yards	175	124
Passing yards	217	140
Turnovers	1	0
Time of possession	34:20	25:40

Team	Category	Player	Statistics
Miami	Passing	Tyler Van Dyke	21/41, 217 yards
Miami	Rushing	Henry Parrish Jr.	16 rushes, 85 yards
Miami	Receiving	Will Mallory	6 receptions, 56 yards
Texas A&M	Passing	Max Johnson	10/20, 140 yards, TD
Texas A&M	Rushing	De’Von Achane	18 rushes, 88 yards
Texas A&M	Receiving	Ainias Smith	4 receptions, 74 yards

=== Vs. No. 10 Arkansas ===
No. 10 Arkansas Razorbacks vs. No. 23 Texas A&M Aggies – Game summary

Quarter	1	2	3	4	Total
No. 10 Razorbacks	14	0	0	7	21
No. 23 Aggies	0	13	10	0	23

at AT&T Stadium, Arlington, Texas

- Date: September 24
- Game time: 6:00 p.m. CDT
- Game weather: None (retractable roof closed)
- Game attendance: 63,580
- Referee: Ken Williamson
- TV announcers (ESPN): Joe Tessitore, Greg McElroy and Katie George
- Box score, Recap

Game information
First quarter
- ARK – Ketron Jackson Jr. 32-yard pass from K. J. Jefferson (Cam Little kick), 9:44. Razorbacks 7–0. Drive: 5 plays, 69 yards, 1:43.
- ARK – Warren Thompson 56-yard pass from K. J. Jefferson (Cam Little kick), 5:25. Razorbacks 14–0. Drive: 7 plays, 78 yards, 2:07.

Second quarter

- TAMU – Evan Stewart 10-yard pass from Max Johnson (Randy Bond kick), 8:45. Razorbacks 14–7. Drive: 6 plays, 93 yards, 3:23.
- TAMU – Demani Richardson 82-yard fumble return (pass failed), 3:11. Razorbacks 14–13.

Third quarter

- TAMU – De’Von Achane 9-yard run (Randy Bond kick), 11:41. Aggies 20–14. Drive: 6 plays, 70 yards, 3:19.
- TAMU – Randy Bond 31-yard field goal, 3:48. Aggies 23–14. Drive: 12 plays, 47 yards, 6:09.

Fourth quarter

- ARK – K. J. Jefferson 6-yard run (Cam Little kick), 10:05. Aggies 23–21. Drive: 13 plays, 74 yards, 4:49.

Statistics

Statistics	ARK	TAMU
First downs	24	15
Total yards	415	343
Rushing yards	244	192
Passing yards	171	151
Turnovers	1	0
Time of possession	30:34	29:26

Team	Category	Player	Statistics
Arkansas	Passing	KJ Jefferson	12/19, 171 yards, 2 TD
Arkansas	Rushing	KJ Jefferson	18 rushes, 105 yards, TD
Arkansas	Receiving	Warren Thompson	2 receptions, 57 yards, TD
Texas A&M	Passing	Max Johnson	11/21, 151 yards, TD
Texas A&M	Rushing	De’Von Achane	19 rushes, 159 yards, TD
Texas A&M	Receiving	Donovan Green	3 receptions, 50 yards

=== At Mississippi State ===
No. 17 Texas A&M Aggies at Mississippi State Bulldogs – Game summary

Quarter	1	2	3	4	Total
No. 17 Aggies	0	0	10	14	24
Bulldogs	0	14	7	21	42

at Davis Wade Stadium, Starkville, Mississippi

- Date: October 1
- Game time: 3:00 p.m. CDT
- Game weather: Sunny, 79 °F (26 °C)
- Game attendance: 51,930
- Referee: Kyle Olson
- TV announcers (SECN): Taylor Zarzour, Matt Stinchcomb and Alyssa Lang
- Box score, Recap

Game information
First quarter
- No scoring plays

Second quarter

- MSST – Caleb Ducking 5-yard pass from Will Rogers (Ben Raybon kick), 6:10. Bulldogs 7–0. Drive: 11 plays, 94 yards, 4:35.
- MSST – Rufus Harvey 4-yard pass from Will Rogers (Ben Raybon kick), 0:58. Bulldogs 14–0. Drive: 9 plays, 70 yards, 3:19.

Third quarter

- TAMU – Randy Bond 24-yard field goal, 8:49. Bulldogs 14–3. Drive: 14 plays, 72 yards, 6:11.
- MSST – Decamerion Richardson 50-yard blocked field goal return (Ben Raybon kick), 5:02. Bulldogs 21–3.
- TAMU – Moose Muhammad III 18-yard pass from Max Johnson (Randy Boyd kick), 2:35. Bulldogs 21–10. Drive: 5 plays, 72 yards, 2:27.

Fourth quarter

- MSST – Dillon Johnson 1-yard run (Ben Raybon kick), 12:42. Bulldogs 28–10. Drive: 12 plays, 75 yards, 4:53.
- TAMU – Haynes King 4-yard run (Randy Bond kick), 7:14. Bulldogs 28–17. Drive: 14 plays, 82 yards, 5:28.
- MSST – RaRa Thomas 75-yard pass from Will Rogers (Ben Raybon kick), 7:03. Bulldogs 35–17. Drive: 1 play, 75 yards, 0:11.
- MSST – Emmanuel Forbes 33-yard interception return (Ben Raybon kick), 3:29. Bulldogs 42–17.
- TAMU – L. J. Johnson Jr. 1-yard run (Randy Bond kick), 1:32. Bulldogs 42–24. Drive: 7 plays, 61 yards, 1:55.

Statistics

Statistics	TAMU	MSST
First downs	27	22
Total yards	388	473
Rushing yards	136	144
Passing yards	252	329
Turnovers	4	1
Time of possession	31:12	28:48

Team	Category	Player	Statistics
Texas A&M	Passing	Max Johnson	19/26, 203 yards, TD
Texas A&M	Rushing	De’Von Achane	16 rushes, 111 yards
Texas A&M	Receiving	Moose Muhammad III	6 receptions, 119 yards, TD
Mississippi State	Passing	Will Rogers	31/45, 329 yards, 3 TD
Mississippi State	Rushing	Dillon Johnson	14 rushes, 68 yards, TD
Mississippi State	Receiving	RaRa Thomas	5 receptions, 134 yards, TD

=== At No. 1 Alabama ===
Texas A&M Aggies at No. 1 Alabama Crimson Tide – Game summary

Quarter	1	2	3	4	Total
Aggies	0	14	3	3	20
No.1 Crimson Tide	0	17	7	0	24

at Bryant–Denny Stadium, Tuscaloosa, Alabama

- Date: October 8
- Game time: 7:00 p.m. CDT
- Game weather: Clear, 65 °F (18 °C)
- Game attendance: 100,077
- Referee: Matt Loeffler
- TV announcers (CBS): Brad Nessler, Gary Danielson and Jenny Dell
- Box score, Recap

Game information
First quarter
- No scoring plays

Second quarter

- ALA – Cameron Latu 10-yard pass from Jalen Milroe (Will Reichard kick), 11:39. Crimson Tide 7–0. Drive: 8 plays, 71 yards, 3:34.
- TAMU – Moose Muhammad III 5-yard pass from Haynes King (Randy Bond kick), 6:33. Tied 7–7. Drive: 6 plays, 30 yards, 2:35.
- ALA – Jermaine Burton 35-yard pass from Jalen Milroe (Will Reichard kick), 5:33. Crimson Tide 14–7. Drive: 3 plays, 75 yards, 1:00.
- TAMU – Donovan Green 3-yard pass from Haynes King (Randy Bond kick), 2:12. Tied 14–14. Drive: 4 plays, 49 yards, 1:21.
- ALA – Will Reichard 50-yard field goal, 0:12. Crimson Tide 17–14. Drive: 4 plays, -4 yards, 0:26.

Third quarter

- ALA – Ja'Corey Brooks 29-yard pass from Jalen Milroe (Will Reichard kick), 13:03. Crimson Tide 24–14. Drive: 5 plays, 75 yards, 1:57.
- TAMU – Randy Bond 41-yard field goal, 5:19. Crimson Tide 24–17. Drive: 5 plays, 39 yards, 1:59.

Fourth quarter

- TAMU – Randy Bond 45-yard field goal, 3:32. Crimson Tide 24–20. Drive: 11 plays, 53 yards, 5:43.

Statistics

Statistics	TAMU	ALA
First downs	18	24
Total yards	323	399
Rushing yards	70	288
Passing yards	253	111
Turnovers	1	4
Time of possession	30:04	29:56

Team	Category	Player	Statistics
Texas A&M	Passing	Haynes King	25/46, 253 yards, 2 TD, INT
Texas A&M	Rushing	De’Von Achane	16 rushes, 62 yards
Texas A&M	Receiving	Evan Stewart	8 receptions, 106 yards
Alabama	Passing	Jalen Milroe	12/19, 111 yards, 3 TD, INT
Alabama	Rushing	Jahmyr Gibbs	21 rushes, 154 yards
Alabama	Receiving	Jermaine Burton	3 receptions, 48 yards, TD

=== At South Carolina ===
Texas A&M Aggies at South Carolina Gamecocks – Game summary

Quarter	1	2	3	4	Total
Aggies	3	11	7	3	24
Gamecocks	17	0	7	6	30

at Williams–Brice Stadium, Columbia, South Carolina

- Date: October 22
- Game time: 6:30 p.m. CDT / 7:30 EDT
- Game weather: Clear, 63 °F (17 °C)
- Game attendance: 77,837
- Referee: Lee Hedrick
- TV announcers (SECN): Tom Hart, Jordan Rodgers and Cole Cubelic
- Box score, Recap

Game information
First quarter
- SC – Xavier Legette 100-yard kickoff return (Mitch Jeter kick), 14:46. Gamecocks 7–0.
- SC – Mitch Jeter 23-yard field goal, 12:22. Gamecocks 10–0. Drive: 4 plays, 0 yards, 0:50.
- SC – Christian Beal-Smith 5-yard run (Mitch Jeter kick), 9:51. Gamecocks 17–0. Drive: 4 plays, 19 yards, 1:44.
- TAMU – Randy Bond 51-yard field goal, 6:28. Gamecocks 17–3. Drive: 8 plays, 41 yards, 3:23.

Second quarter

- TAMU – Randy Bond 26-yard field goal, 13:30. Gamecocks 17–6. Drive: 6 plays, 20 yards, 2:55.
- TAMU – Max Wright 9-yard pass from Haynes King (Haynes King pass to Evan Stewart), 2:00. Gamecocks 17–14. Drive: 13 plays, 94 yards, 8:04.

Third quarter

- SC – MarShawn Lloyd 18-yard run (Mitch Jeter kick), 3:25. Gamecocks 24–14. Drive: 6 plays, 51 yards, 2:47.
- TAMU – De’Von Achane 15-yard run (Randy Bond kick), 0:27. Gamecocks 24–21. Drive: 3 plays, 24 yards, 1:21.

Fourth quarter

- SC – MarShawn Lloyd 18-yard run (kick blocked), 3:08. Gamecocks 30–21. Drive: 8 plays, 80 yards, 5:13.
- TAMU – Randy Bond 28-yard field goal, 0:10. Gamecocks 30–24. Drive: 7 plays, 83 yards, 0:51.

Statistics

Statistics	TAMU	SC
First downs	23	13
Total yards	398	286
Rushing yards	129	118
Passing yards	269	168
Turnovers	2	2
Time of possession	33:08	26:52

Team	Category	Player	Statistics
Texas A&M	Passing	Haynes King	17/32, 178 yards, TD, INT
Texas A&M	Rushing	De’Von Achane	20 rushes, 99 yards, TD
Texas A&M	Receiving	Evan Stewart	6 receptions, 87 yards
South Carolina	Passing	Spencer Rattler	12/25, 168 yards
South Carolina	Rushing	MarShawn Lloyd	18 rushes, 92 yards, 2 TD
South Carolina	Receiving	Austin Stogner	3 receptions, 46 yards

=== No. 15 Ole Miss ===
No. 15 Ole Miss Rebels at Texas A&M Aggies – Game summary

Quarter	1	2	3	4	Total
No. 15 Rebels	7	3	14	7	31
Aggies	14	0	0	14	28

at Kyle Field, College Station, Texas

- Date: October 29
- Game time: 6:30 p.m. CDT
- Game weather: Cloudy, 62 °F (17 °C)
- Game attendance: 101,084
- Referee: Matt Loeffler
- TV announcers (SECN): Tom Hart, Jordan Rodgers and Cole Cubelic
- Box score, Recap

Game information
First quarter
- MISS – Dayton Wade 18-yard pass from Jaxson Dart (Jonathan Cruz kick), 13:02. Rebels 7–0. Drive: 7 plays, 75 yards, 1:52.
- TAMU – Moose Muhammad III 3-yard pass from Conner Weigman (Randy Bond kick), 9:37. Tied 7–7. Drive: 8 plays, 77 yards, 3:31.
- TAMU – Evan Stewart 15-yard pass from Conner Weigman (Randy Bond kick), 4:16. Aggies 14–7. Drive: 6 plays, 81 yards, 2:56.

Second quarter

- MISS – Jonathan Cruz 46-yard field goal, 3:33. Aggies 14–10. Drive: 15 plays, 62 yards, 5:37.

Third quarter

- MISS – Casey Kelly 1-yard pass from Jaxson Dart (Jonathan Cruz kick), 8:00. Rebels 17–14. Drive: 13 plays, 94 yards, 5:43.
- MISS – Jonathan Mingo 2-yard pass from Jaxson Dart (Jonathan Cruz kick), 1:02. Rebels 24–14. Drive: 8 plays, 85 yards, 2:26.

Fourth quarter

- TAMU – Noah Thomas 2-yard pass from Conner Weigman (Randy Bond kick), 9:11. Rebels 24–21. Drive: 6 plays, 62 yards, 2:57.
- MISS – Quinshon Judkins 1-yard run (Jonathan Cruz kick), 7:18. Rebels 31–21. Drive: 4 plays, 75 yards, 1:53.
- TAMU – De’Von Achane 7-yard pass from Conner Weigman (Randy Bond kick), 1:25. Rebels 31–28. Drive: 10 plays, 80 yards, 1:56.

Statistics

Statistics	MISS	TAMU
First downs	26	26
Total yards	530	480
Rushing yards	390	142
Passing yards	140	338
Turnovers	0	0
Time of possession	31:47	28:13

Team	Category	Player	Statistics
Ole Miss	Passing	Jaxson Dart	13/20, 140 yards, 3 TD
Ole Miss	Rushing	Quinshon Judkins	34 rushes, 205 yards, TD
Ole Miss	Receiving	Jonathan Mingo	4 receptions, 89 yards, TD
Texas A&M	Passing	Conner Weigman	28/44, 338 yards, 4 TD
Texas A&M	Rushing	De’Von Achane	25 rushes, 138 yards
Texas A&M	Receiving	Moose Muhammad III	8 receptions, 112 yards, TD

=== Florida ===
Florida Gators at Texas A&M Aggies – Game summary

Quarter	1	2	3	4	Total
Gators	17	3	14	7	41
Aggies	14	10	0	0	24

at Kyle Field, College Station, Texas

- Date: November 5
- Game time: 11:00 a.m. CDT
- Game weather: Sunny, 57 °F (14 °C)
- Game attendance: 97,797
- Referee: James Carter
- TV announcers (ESPN): Mark Jones, Robert Griffin III and Quint Kessenich
- Box score, Recap

Game information
First quarter
- FLA – Adam Mihalek 50-yard field goal, 10:41. Gators 3–0. Drive: 9 plays, 42 yards, 4:19.
- TAMU – De’Von Achane 5-yard run (Randy Bond kick), 9:21. Aggies 7–3. Drive: 3 plays, 75 yards, 1:20.
- FLA – Anthony Richardson 10-yard run (Adam Mihalek kick), 6:01. Gators 10–7. Drive: 8 plays, 75 yards, 3:20.
- TAMU – De’Von Achane 5-yard pass from Haynes King (Randy Bond kick), 1:47. Aggies 14–10. Drive: 11 plays, 75 yards, 4:14.
- FLA – Anthony Richardson 60-yard run (Adam Mihalek kick), 0:33. Gators 17–14. Drive: 3 plays, 75 yards, 1:14.

Second quarter

- TAMU – Randy Bond 24-yard field goal, 11:58. Tied 17–17. Drive: 10 plays, 68 yards, 3:35.
- FLA – Adam Mihalek 24-yard field goal, 4:49. Gators 20–17. Drive: 15 plays, 68 yards, 7:09.
- TAMU – De’Von Achane 2-yard run (Randy Bond kick), 1:00. Aggies 24–20. Drive: 6 plays, 74 yards, 1:04.

Third quarter

- FLA – Ja'Quavion Fraziars 19-yard pass from Anthony Richrdson (Adam Mihalek kick), 13:32. Gators 27–24. Drive: 2 plays, 40 yards, 0:32.
- FLA – Caleb Douglas 12-yard pass from Anthony Richardson (Adam Mihalek kick), 3:58. Gators 34–24. Drive: 10 plays, 81 yards, 5:06.

Fourth quarter

- FLA – Montrell Johnson Jr. 5-yard run (Adam Mihalek kick), 1:21. Gators 41–24. Drive: 4 plays, 24 yards, 2:15.

Statistics

Statistics	FLA	TAMU
First downs	28	23
Total yards	492	413
Rushing yards	291	134
Passing yards	201	279
Turnovers	0	2
Time of possession	37:07	22:53

Team	Category	Player	Statistics
Florida	Passing	Anthony Richardson	17/28, 201 yards, 2 TD
Florida	Rushing	Montrell Johnson Jr.	22 rushes, 100 yards, TD
Florida	Receiving	Ricky Pearsall	3 receptions, 65 yards
Texas A&M	Passing	Haynes King	23/45, 279 yards, TD
Texas A&M	Rushing	De’Von Achane	16 rushes, 122 yards, 2 TD
Texas A&M	Receiving	Evan Stewart	8 receptions, 120 yards

The Aggies suffered a flu outbreak earlier in the week, with several starters on offense and defense being ruled out.

=== At Auburn ===
Texas A&M Aggies at Auburn Tigers – Game summary

Quarter	1	2	3	4	Total
Aggies	0	0	0	10	10
Tigers	7	0	3	3	13

at Jordan–Hare Stadium, Auburn, Alabama

- Date: November 12
- Game time: 6:30 p.m. CST
- Game weather: Cloudy, 53 °F (12 °C)
- Game attendance: 87,451
- Referee: David Smith
- TV announcers (SECN): Tom Hart, Jordan Rogers and Cole Cubelic
- Box score, Recap

Game information
First quarter
- AUB – Ja'Varrius Johnson 16-yard pass from Robby Ashford (Alex McPherson kick), 1:33. Tigers 7–0. Drive: 4 plays, 62 yards, 2:03.

Second quarter

- No scoring plays

Third quarter

- AUB – Alex McPherson 34-yard field goal, 0:39. Tigers 10–0. Drive: 4 plays, 9 yards, 2:01.

Fourth quarter

- TAMU – Randy Bond 48-yard field goal, 10:48. Tigers 10–3. Drive: 4 plays, 8 yards, 1:52.
- AUB – Alex McPherson 26-yard field goal, 3:02. Tigers 13–3. Drive: 6 plays, 23 yards, 2:32.
- TAMU – Jalen Preston 17-yard pass from Conner Weigman (Randy Bond kick), 1:33. Tigers 13–10. Drive: 7 plays, 80 yards, 1:24.

Statistics

Statistics	TAMU	AUB
First downs	12	18
Total yards	215	330
Rushing yards	94	270
Passing yards	121	60
Turnovers	1	3
Time of possession	23:34	36:26

Team	Category	Player	Statistics
Texas A&M	Passing	Conner Weigman	14/36, 121 yards, TD
Texas A&M	Rushing	Amari Daniels	11 rushes, 83 yards
Texas A&M	Receiving	Jalen Preston	3 receptions, 43 yards, TD
Auburn	Passing	Robby Ashford	6/13, 60 yards, TD, 2 INT
Auburn	Rushing	Tank Bigsby	23 rushes, 121 yards
Auburn	Receiving	Tank Bigsby	2 receptions, 20 yards

With the loss, the Aggies lost their sixth game in a row for the program's first six game losing streak since 1972. Additionally, the loss guaranteed the Aggies' first losing season since 2009.

=== UMass ===
UMass Minutemen at Texas A&M Aggies – Game summary

Quarter	1	2	3	4	Total
Minutemen	0	3	0	0	3
Aggies	3	7	3	7	20

at Kyle Field, College Station, Texas

- Date: November 19
- Game time: 11:00 a.m. CST
- Game weather: Rain, 39 °F (4 °C)
- Game attendance: 90,177
- Referee: Wayne Winkler
- TV announcers (ESPN+/SECN+): Kevin Brown and Hutson Mason
- Box score, Recap

Game information
First quarter
- TAMU – Randy Bond 27-yard field goal, 10:58. Aggies 3–0. Drive: 9 plays, 55 yards, 3:56.

Second quarter

- MASS – Cameron Carson 25-yard field goal, 14:06. Tied 3–3. Drive: 13 plays, 72 yards, 5:45.
- TAMU – Noah Thomas 22-yard pass from Conner Weigman (Randy Bond kick), 5:56. Aggies 10–3. Drive: 4 plays, 47 yards, 1:56.

Third quarter

- TAMU – Randy Bond 35-yard field goal, 7:49. Aggies 13–3. Drive: 9 plays, 46 yards, 3:56.

Fourth quarter

- TAMU – Le'Veon Moss 12-yard run (Randy Bond kick), 5:10. Aggies 20–3. Drive: 4 plays, 36 yards, 1:48.

Statistics

Statistics	MASS	TAMU
First downs	10	16
Total yards	168	398
Rushing yards	113	207
Passing yards	55	191
Turnovers	1	3
Time of possession	32:23	27:37

Team	Category	Player	Statistics
UMass	Passing	Brady Olson	9/22, 55 yards
UMass	Rushing	Kay'Ron Adams	14 rushes, 58 yards
UMass	Receiving	Isaac Ross	4 receptions, 25 yards
Texas A&M	Passing	Conner Weigman	11/19, 191 yards, TD
Texas A&M	Rushing	Le'Veon Moss	12 rushes, 72 yards, TD
Texas A&M	Receiving	Moose Muhammad III	3 receptions, 75 yards

=== No. 5 LSU ===
No. 5 LSU Tigers at Texas A&M Aggies – Game summary

Quarter	1	2	3	4	Total
No. 5 Tigers	0	10	7	6	23
Aggies	7	10	7	14	38

at Kyle Field, College Station, Texas

- Date: November 26
- Game time: 6:00 p.m. CST
- Game weather: Clear, 56 °F (13 °C)
- Game attendance: 93,578
- Referee: Kyle Olson
- TV announcers (ESPN): Joe Tessitore, Greg McElroy and Katie George
- Box score, Recap

Game information
First quarter
- TAMU – De’Von Achane 10-yard run (Randy Bond kick), 4:54. Aggies 7–0. Drive: 15 plays, 90 yards, 7:37.

Second quarter

- LSU – John Emery Jr. 4-yard kick (Damian Ramos kick), 14:00. Tied 7–7. Drive: 12 plays, 75 yards, 5:54.
- TAMU – Randy Bond 25-yard field goal, 9:23. Aggies 10–7. Drive: 12 plays, 58 yards, 4:37.
- LSU – Damian Ramos 34-yard field goal, 5:38. Tied 10–10. Drive: 10 plays, 59 yards, 3:45.
- TAMU – Donovan Green 3-yard pass from Conner Weigman (Randy Bond kick), 1:10. Aggies 17–10. Drive: 9 plays, 72 yards, 4:28.

Third quarter

- LSU – John Emery Jr. 19-yard run (Damian Ramos kick), 9:40. Tied 17–17. Drive: 9 plays, 71 yards, 4:34.
- TAMU – Demani Richardson 27-yard fumble return (Randy Bond kick), 7:03. Aggies 24–17.

Fourth quarter

- TAMU – Moose Muhammad III 21-yard pass from Conner Weigman (Randy Bond kick), 14:54. Aggies 31–17. Drive: 8 plays, 83 yards, 3:03.
- TAMU – De’Von Achane 10-yard run (Randy Bond kick), 7:46. Aggies 38–17. Drive: 8 plays, 77 yards, 4:43.
- LSU – John Emery Jr. 3-yard run (run failed), 6:21. Aggies 38–23. Drive: 6 plays, 75 yards, 1:25.

Statistics

Statistics	LSU	TAMU
First downs	25	25
Total yards	384	430
Rushing yards	187	275
Passing yards	197	155
Turnovers	1	0
Time of possession	28:14	31:46

Team	Category	Player	Statistics
LSU	Passing	Jayden Daniels	21/35, 189 yards
LSU	Rushing	Jayden Daniels	12 rushes, 84 yards
LSU	Receiving	Malik Nabers	7 receptions, 69 yards
Texas A&M	Passing	Conner Weigman	12/18, 155 yards 2 TD
Texas A&M	Rushing	De’Von Achane	38 rushes, 215 yards 2 TD
Texas A&M	Receiving	Moose Muhammad III	5 receptions, 94 yards TD

== Rankings ==
Ranking movements Legend: ██ Increase in ranking ██ Decrease in ranking — = Not ranked RV = Received votes
	Week															
Poll	Pre	1	2	3	4	5	6	7	8	9	10	11	12	13	14	Final
AP	6	6	24	23	17	RV	—	—	—	—	—	—	—	—	—	—
Coaches	7	6	22	20	17	RV	RV	—	—	—	—	—	—	—	—	—
CFP	Not released									—	—	—	—	—	—	Not released

== Statistics ==
=== Scoring ===
Texas A&M vs Non-Conference Opponents

	1	2	3	4	Total
Texas A&M	20	24	24	14	82
Opponents	3	10	10	6	29

Texas A&M vs SEC Opponents

	1	2	3	4	Total
Texas A&M	38	58	37	58	191
Opponents	62	47	59	57	225

Texas A&M vs All Opponents

	1	2	3	4	Total
Texas A&M	58	82	61	72	273
Opponents	65	57	69	63	254
