= 2023 All-SEC football team =

American college football all-star team

The 2023 All-SEC football team consists of American football players selected to the All-Southeastern Conference (SEC) chosen by the Associated Press (AP) and the conference coaches for the 2023 Southeastern Conference football season.

Alabama won the conference, defeating Georgia 27–24 in the SEC Championship.

LSU quarterback Jayden Daniels was voted the conference's Offensive Player of the Year (AP and Coaches). Mississippi State linebacker Nathaniel Watson was selected the Defensive Player of the Year from the AP vote, while Alabama outside linebacker Dallas Turner was selected from the Coaches vote. Alabama placekicker/punter Will Reichard was named the SEC Special Teams Player of the Year. Alabama defensive back Caleb Downs was voted SEC Newcomer/Freshman of the Year (AP and Coaches). Eliah Drinkwitz of Missouri was voted SEC Coach of the Year (AP and Coaches).

== Offensive selections ==
=== Quarterbacks ===
- Jayden Daniels, LSU (AP-1, Coaches-1)
- Carson Beck, Georgia (Coaches-2)
- Jalen Milroe, Alabama (AP-2)

=== Running backs ===
- Cody Schrader, Missouri (AP-1, Coaches-1)
- Quinshon Judkins, Ole Miss (AP-2, Coaches-1)
- Ray Davis, Kentucky (AP-1, Coaches-2)
- Jarquez Hunter, Auburn (Coaches-2)
- Jaylen Wright, Tennessee (AP-2)

=== Wide receivers ===
- Malik Nabers, LSU (AP-1, Coaches-1)
- Luther Burden III, Missouri (AP-1, Coaches-1)
- Brian Thomas Jr., LSU (AP-2, Coaches-2)
- Xavier Legette, South Carolina (AP-2, Coaches-2)

=== Centers ===
- Sedrick Van Pran-Granger, Georgia (AP-1, Coaches-1)
- Eli Cox, Kentucky (Coaches-2)
- Cooper Mays, Tennessee (AP-2)

=== Offensive line ===
- JC Latham, Alabama (AP-1, Coaches-1)
- Javon Foster, Missouri (AP-1, Coaches-1)
- Tate Ratledge, Georgia (AP-1, Coaches-1)
- Will Campbell, LSU (AP-2, Coaches-1)
- Tyler Booker, Alabama (AP-1, Coaches-2)
- Xavier Truss, Georgia (Coaches-2)
- Emery Jones, LSU (Coaches-2)
- Layden Robinson, Texas A&M (Coaches-2)
- Gunner Britton, Auburn (AP-2)
- Joshua Braun, Arkansas (AP-2)
- Cam'Ron Johnson, Missouri (AP-2)

=== Tight ends ===
- Brock Bowers, Georgia (AP-1, Coaches-1)
- Caden Prieskorn, Ole Miss (Coaches-2)
- Trey Knox, South Carolina (Coaches-2)
- Rivaldo Fairweather, Auburn (AP-2, Coaches-2)

== Defensive selections ==
=== Defensive ends ===
- Darius Robinson, Missouri (AP-1, Coaches-1)
- James Pearce Jr., Tennessee (AP-1, Coaches-1)
- Landon Jackson, Arkansas (AP-2, Coaches-1)
- Mykel Williams, Georgia (Coaches-2)
- Princely Umanmielen, Florida (AP-2, Coaches-2)
- Shemar Turner, Texas A&M (Coaches-2)

=== Defensive tackles ===
- Justin Eboigbe, Alabama (AP-2, Coaches-1)
- Nazir Stackhouse, Georgia (Coaches-2)
- Marcus Harris, Auburn (AP-2)
- Deone Walker, Kentucky (AP-2)

=== Linebackers ===
- Edgerrin Cooper, Texas A&M (AP-1, Coaches-1)
- Dallas Turner, Alabama (AP-1, Coaches-1)
- Nathaniel Watson, Mississippi State (AP-1, Coaches-1)
- Harold Perkins, LSU (Coaches-2)
- Smael Mondon Jr., Georgia (Coaches-2)
- Ty'Ron Hopper, Missouri (Coaches-2)
- Jett Johnson, Mississippi State (AP-2)
- Chris Braswell, Alabama (AP-2)
- Debo Williams, South Carolina (AP-2)

=== Defensive backs ===
- Kool-Aid McKinstry, Alabama (AP-1, Coaches-1)
- Malaki Starks, Georgia (AP-1, Coaches-1)
- Kris Abrams-Draine, Missouri (AP-1, Coaches-1)
- Caleb Downs, Alabama (AP-2, Coaches-1)
- Terrion Arnold, Alabama (AP-2, Coaches-1)
- Jaylin Simpson, Auburn (AP-1)
- Maxwell Hairston, Kentucky (AP-2)
- Javon Bullard, Georgia (AP-2)

== Special teams ==
=== Kickers ===
- Will Reichard, Alabama (AP-1, Coaches-1)
- Harrison Mevis, Missouri (AP-2, Coaches-2)

=== Punters ===
- Matthew Hayball, Vanderbilt (AP-1, Coaches-1)
- James Burnip, Alabama (Coaches-2)
- Max Fletcher, Arkansas (Coaches-2)
- Jeremy Crawshaw, Florida (AP-2)

=== All purpose/return specialist ===
- Ainias Smith, Texas A&M (AP-1, Coaches-1)
- Barion Brown, Kentucky (AP-2, Coaches-2)

== Key ==
Bold = Consensus first-team selection by both the coaches and AP

AP = Associated Press

Coaches = Selected by the SEC coaches

== See also ==
- 2023 Southeastern Conference football season
- 2023 College Football All-America Team
- Southeastern Conference football individual awards
