= Maplesville High School =

High school in Maplesville, Alabama, United States

Coordinates: 32.80277°N 86.87765°W

Location
- 1256 Alabama Hwy. 139; Maplesville, Alabama 36750; United States

Information
- School district: Chilton County School District
- CEEB code: 011705
- Principal: Darrell Baker (2025-Present)
- Staff: 29.15 (FTE)
- Grades: Pre-K-12
- Enrollment: 545 (2023–2024)
- Classes: Blocks
- Student to teacher ratio: 18.70
- Campus size: One floor, three buildings
- Colors: Red and white
- Slogan: "Red and White, Fight! Fight! Fight!"
- Song: "Spirit, Pride, Tradition"
- Athletics: Football, softball, baseball, cheer, volleyball
- Sports: Football, Baseball, Softball, Basketball, Women's Basketball, Volleyball, Track
- Mascot: Blaze The Red Devil
- Team name: Maplesville Red Devils
- Accreditation: SACS
- Website: mhs.chiltonboe.com

Maplesville High School is a secondary school located in Maplesville, Alabama. They educate grades K-12.

As of 2025, the school principal is Darrell Baker. The school colors are red and white and their team name is the Maplesville Red Devils.

== History ==
The original Maplesville High School building was used from 1924 until 1962, when a new building was built. The old building burned down in 1976.

== Athletics ==
In 1995, the school's girls' basketball team won the 1A State Championship. In 1996, 2014, 2015, 2016, and 2025 the school's football team won the 1A State Championship. The football team has also appeared in the 1995, 2013, and 2024 1A State Championship games, and finished as runner up. In 1996 and 1997, the school's baseball team won back-to-back 1A State Championships.

== Notable alumni ==
- Harold Morrow, former Auburn and NFL player
- Nathaniel Watson, former Mississippi State and NFL player
- Tommie Agee, former Auburn and NFL player
