= Tommie Agee (American football) =

American football player (born 1964)

No. 33, 32, 34
- Position: Running back

Personal information
- Born: February 22, 1964 (age 62); Maplesville, Alabama, U.S.
- Listed height: 6 ft 0 in (1.83 m)
- Listed weight: 235 lb (107 kg)

Career information
- High school: Maplesville
- College: Auburn
- NFL draft: 1987: 5th round, 119th overall pick

Career history
- Seattle Seahawks (1987–1988); Kansas City Chiefs (1989); Dallas Cowboys (1990–1994)

Awards and highlights
- 2× Super Bowl champion (XXVII, XXVIII)

Career NFL statistics
- Games played: 100
- Rushing yards: 309
- Average: 3.4
- Touchdowns: 2
- Stats at Pro Football Reference

Thomas Lee Agee (born February 22, 1964) is an American former professional football player who was a running back in the National Football League (NFL) for the Seattle Seahawks, Kansas City Chiefs, and Dallas Cowboys. He played college football for the Auburn Tigers. He won Super Bowl XXVII and Super Bowl XXVIII with the Cowboys back-to-back, beating the Buffalo Bills in both games.

== Early life ==
Agee attended Maplesville High School, where he earned All-state honors in football, basketball, and track. He also practiced baseball.

He accepted a football scholarship from Auburn University. His best season came as a redshirt freshman playing in a wishbone offense, on a backfield that included Bo Jackson, Lionel James and Brent Fullwood. He was third on the team with 115 carries for 604 yards (5.3-yard average) and 4 touchdowns. He had 24 carries for 219 yards and 2 touchdowns against the University of Maryland.

As a sophomore the team changed the offense to an I formation, where he was forced to focus more on his blocking. He registered 94 carries (second on the team) for 456 yards (third on the team), a 4.9-yard average and one touchdown.

As a junior, he was third on the team with 81 carries for 402 yards (5.0-yard average) and 4 touchdowns. He had 95 rushing yards, including a 68-yard run against Florida State University. He scored 2 touchdowns against the University of Southern Mississippi.

As a senior, he was second on the team with 66 carries for 271 yards (4.1-yard average), one rushing touchdown, 18 receptions for 200 yards and one receiving touchdown. He also was named the special teams captain.

Agee was a four-year starter at fullback, that was primarily used as the lead blocker for Bo Jackson and Brent Fullwood. He finished his college career with 356 carries for 1,733 yards (4.9-yard average), 10 rushing touchdowns, 32 receptions for 321 yards, 3 receiving touchdowns, and returned 10 kickoffs for a 21.5 yard average.

In 2019, he was inducted into the Alabama Sports Hall of Fame.

== Professional career ==
Pre-draft measurables
Height	Weight	Arm length	Hand span	Bench press
5 ft 11 3/4 in (1.82 m)	217 lb (98 kg)	30 3/4 in (0.78 m)	9 in (0.23 m)	15 reps

=== Seattle Seahawks ===
Agee was selected by the Seattle Seahawks in the fifth round (119th overall) of the 1987 NFL draft, the same year as fellow Auburn running backs Bo Jackson, Brent Fullwood, and Tim Jessie. As a rookie, he suffered a preseason knee injury and was placed on the injured reserve list. In 1988, he was a backup tallying one carry for 2 yards and 3 receptions for 31 yards.

=== Kansas City Chiefs ===
In 1989, he signed in Plan B free agency with the Kansas City Chiefs. He spent the first six weeks of the season on the injured reserve list, after suffering torn ligaments in his left ring finger during the third preseason game against the Chicago Bears. He appeared in 9 games as a backup behind the NFL's leading rusher Christian Okoye, finishing with one carry for 3 yards.

=== Dallas Cowboys ===
In March 1990, the Dallas Cowboys signed him as a Plan B free agent. He started 11 games at fullback after Daryl Johnston suffered a shoulder injury during preseason. He blocked for Emmitt Smith, started 11 games and was second on the team with 53 carries for 213 yards.

In 1991, he was passed on the depth chart by Johnston and was used mainly on special teams, making 8 tackles. In 1992, he was fourth on the team with 13 special teams tackles.

On November 16, 1993, he was released to make room for running back Lincoln Coleman. On November 30, he was re-signed after Derrick Gainer injured his shoulder. He was de-activated for the playoffs including Super Bowl XXVIII. He wasn't re-signed after the 1994 season.

== Personal life ==
Agee's great nephew Nathaniel Watson was selected by the Cleveland Browns in the 6th round of the 2024 NFL draft.

In 2018, he was named the Director of Leisure Services and special assistant to the mayor for the City of Andalusia, Alabama.
