= Derrick Moore (defensive end) =

American football player (born 2002)

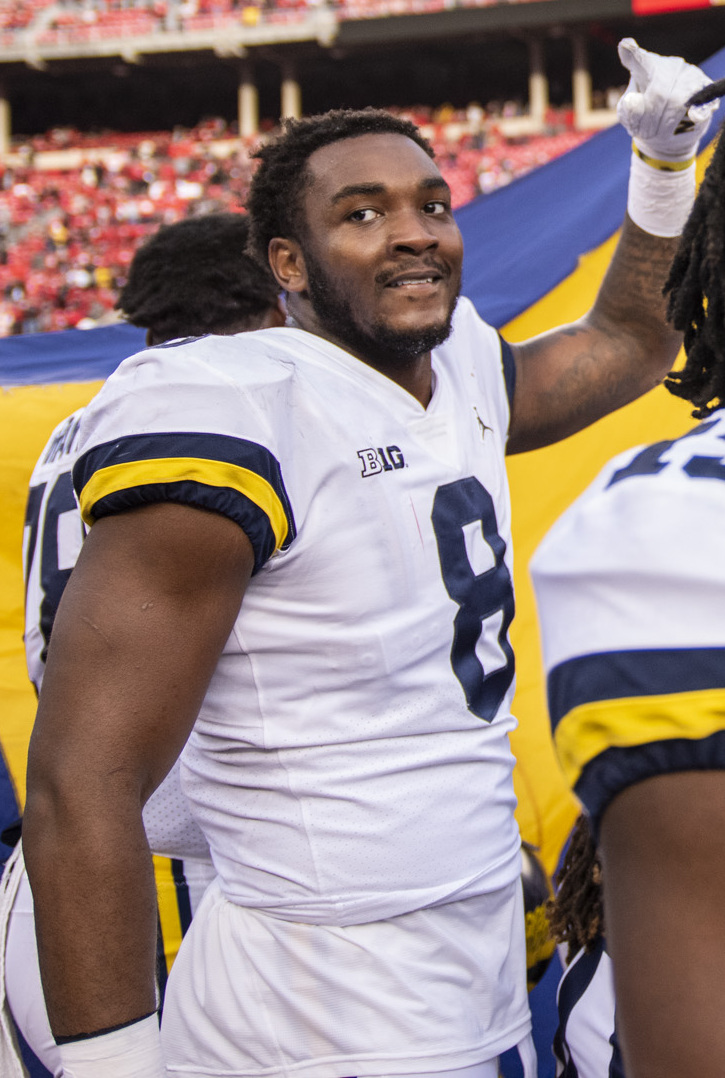
- Moore with the Michigan Wolverines in 2022

No. 8 – Detroit Lions
- Position: Defensive end
- Roster status: Active

Personal information
- Born: December 6, 2002 (age 23); Baltimore, Maryland, U.S.
- Listed height: 6 ft 4 in (1.93 m)
- Listed weight: 255 lb (116 kg)

Career information
- High school: Saint Frances Academy (Baltimore)
- College: Michigan (2022–2025)
- NFL draft: 2026: 2nd round, 44th overall pick

Career history
- Detroit Lions (2026–present)

Awards and highlights
- CFP national champion (2023); First-team All-Big Ten (2025)

Career NFL statistics as of Week 9, 2026
- Total tackles: 7
- Sacks: 4
- Stats at Pro Football Reference

Derrick Clarence Moore (born December 6, 2002) is an American professional football defensive end for the Detroit Lions of the National Football League (NFL). He played college football for the Michigan Wolverines, winning a national championship in 2023 and earning All-Big Ten honors in 2025. Moore was selected by the Lions in the second round of the 2026 NFL draft.

== Early life ==
Moore was born on December 6, 2002 in Baltimore, Maryland. The son of Jakia Stewart and Derrick Moore Sr. He attended Saint Frances Academy in Baltimore, Maryland and was football teammates with Blake Corum and Jaishawn Barham. As a senior, Moore was named the 2021 Maryland Gatorade Player of the Year. He recorded 55 tackles, 24 tackles for a loss and 12 sacks on the season, leading the Panthers to an 8-1 record and the No. 5 national ranking in the USA Today's Super 25. Moore helped St. Frances hand Florida powerhouse, IMG Academy, its first home loss since 2014. He was ranked as the No. 20 overall recruit in the nation by ESPN in the 2022 college football recruiting class.

After his senior year, he was invited to play in the Under Armour All-America Game. He recorded two sacks, multiple quarterback pressures and was the 2022 Under Armour All-America Game MVP. Moore initially committed to Oklahoma, but decommitted after Lincoln Riley left the program. He received offers from Alabama, Georgia, Michigan, Notre Dame, Ohio State and Ole Miss, amongst others. In December 2021, Moore ultimately committed to play for the Michigan Wolverines.

== College career ==
=== Freshman season (2022) ===
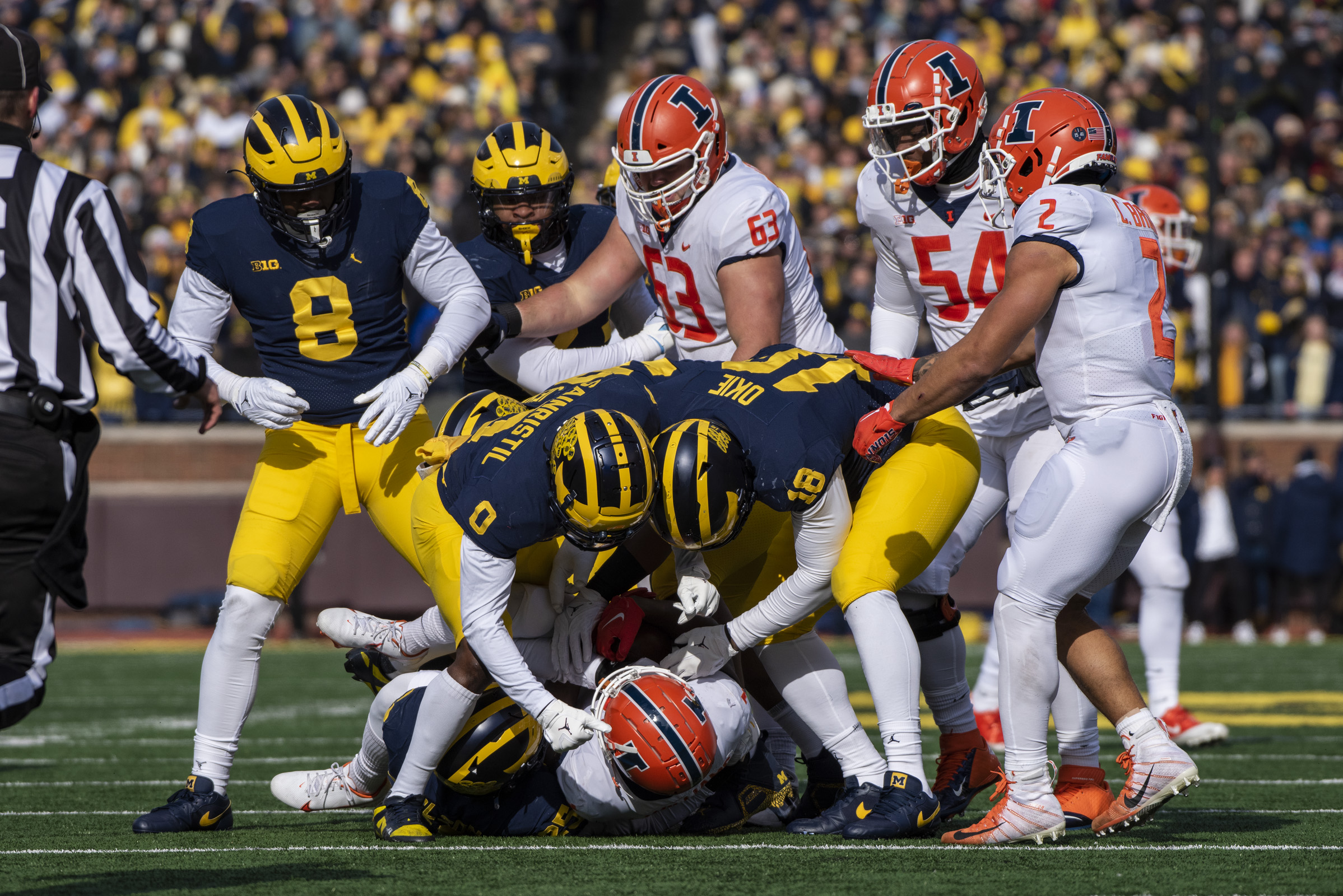
Moore (No. 8) in a 19-17 victory versus Illinois in 2022

In January 2022, Moore enrolled early at the University of Michigan. In April 2022, after seeing Moore play in spring practice, Michigan head coach Jim Harbaugh called him "a fantastic player" and "really gifted athletically". As a freshman, Moore appeared in all 14 games for the Wolverines, totaling eight tackles and two sacks on the year. His first career sack came against Maryland Terrapins quarterback Taulia Tagovailoa on September 24, 2022.

=== Sophomore season (2023) ===
In 2023, Moore appeared in all 15 games for the Wolverines. He totaled 34 tackles on the year, including five sacks, a forced fumble and a fumble recovery for his first career touchdown versus Maryland on November 18, 2023. He was third on the team in sacks for the season. Moore's most glorious moment came on the final play of the Rose Bowl, when he tackled Alabama quarterback Jalen Milroe on 4th and goal to end the game and secure the Wolverines’ victory. Moore was an All-Big Ten honorable mention by both the coaches and media, helping lead Michigan to a national championship win in 2023.

=== Junior season (2024) ===
In 2024, Moore moved into a larger role and became a full-time starter at strong side defensive end. In week five against Minnesota, he had his first sack of the season. In week nine versus Michigan State, Moore had three tackles, including a sack as Michigan defeated the Spartans 24-17. In the ReliaQuest Bowl, Moore led the Wolverines with two sacks on Alabama’s Jalen Milroe and recovered a fumble as Michigan defeated the Crimson Tide for a second consecutive season in a bowl game. Moore started 12 games in 2024, finishing with 23 tackles, 6 tackles for a loss and was third on the team with four sacks. He was an All-Big Ten honorable mention for a consecutive season as a junior.

=== Senior season (2025) ===
In 2025, Moore was named a captain for his senior season. In game four against Nebraska, he had his first sacks of the season. In game seven, eight and nine, Moore had two sacks in three consecutive games against Washington, Michigan State, and Purdue. Moore finished his senior season with 30 tackles, 10 sacks, and forced two fumbles in 12 games. He was selected as first-team All-Big Ten. Before the Citrus Bowl, Moore declared for the 2026 NFL draft. Moore was named the Bo Schembechler MVP for the 2025 Michigan Wolverines.

== Professional career ==
Pre-draft measurables
Height	Weight	Arm length	Hand span	Wingspan	Vertical jump	Broad jump
6 ft 3 7/8 in (1.93 m)	255 lb (116 kg)	33 3/8 in (0.85 m)	9 1/8 in (0.23 m)	6 ft 9 1/4 in (2.06 m)	30.0 in (0.76 m)	9 ft 7 in (2.92 m)
All values from NFL Combine/Pro Day

Moore was selected by the Detroit Lions with the 44th overall pick in the second round of the 2026 NFL draft. The Lions traded up from their original spot at pick 50 with the New York Jets to select him.
