= Harold Morrow =

American football player (born 1973)

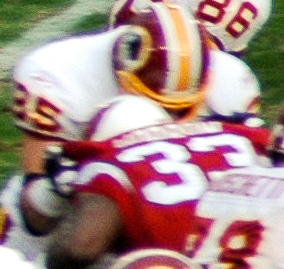
- Morrow (33) with the Arizona Cardinals in 2005

No. 33
- Position: Fullback

Personal information
- Born: February 24, 1973 (age 53); Maplesville, Alabama, U.S.
- Listed height: 5 ft 11 in (1.80 m)
- Listed weight: 232 lb (105 kg)

Career information
- High school: Maplesville
- College: Auburn
- NFL draft: 1996: undrafted

Career history
- Dallas Cowboys (1996)*; Minnesota Vikings (1996–2002); Baltimore Ravens (2003–2004); Arizona Cardinals (2005)
- * Offseason or practice squad member only

Career NFL statistics
- Rushing attempts: 17
- Rushing yards: 75
- Receptions: 14
- Receiving yards: 144
- Return yards: 362
- Stats at Pro Football Reference

Harold Morrow Jr. (born February 24, 1973) is an American former professional football player who was a fullback for the Minnesota Vikings, Baltimore Ravens, and Arizona Cardinals of the National Football League (NFL). He played college football for the Auburn Tigers, and signed with the Dallas Cowboys as an undrafted free agent in 1996.

== Early life ==
Morrow attended Maplesville High School in Maplesville, Alabama. He earned first-team All-State honors and was named to the Alabama-Mississippi All-Star Classic after his senior season.

== College career ==
Morrow played college football for the Auburn Tigers from 1991 to 1995. He was redshirted in 1991. He rushed 54 times for 216 yards and two touchdowns, and caught 51 passes for 474 yards and three touchdowns during his college career.

== Professional career ==
=== Dallas Cowboys ===
Morrow signed with the Dallas Cowboys on April 15, 1996, after going undrafted in the 1996 NFL draft. He was waived in August 1996.

=== Minnesota Vikings ===
Morrow was claimed off waivers by the Minnesota Vikings August 26, 1996. He played in eight games for the Vikings in 1996, returning six kicks for 117 yards. He appeared in all 16 games in 1997, recording five kick returns for 99 yards. Morrow played in 11 games during the 1998 season, rushing three times for seven yards and recovering one fumble.

He became a free agent after the 1998 season and re-signed with the Vikings on April 23, 1999. He appeared in 16 games in 1999, totaling two rushing attempts for one yard, 12 solo tackles, two assisted tackles and one fumble recovery. Morrow became a free agent again after the 1999 season and re-signed with the team on March 7, 2000. He played in 16 games in 2000, accumulating one reception for two yards, eight solo tackles, four assisted tackles and one fumble recovery. He appeared in 16 games, making the only two starts of his career, during the 2001 season, recording 12 rushing attempts for 67 yards, 13 catches for 142 yards, six kick returns for 109 yards, 11 solo tackles, one fumble and three fumble recoveries.

Morrow became a free agent in March 2002 and re-signed with the Vikings on March 6, 2002. He played in 16 games for the Vikings during the 2002 season, totaling 11 solo tackles and one assisted tackle. He was released by the Vikings on February 27, 2003.

=== Baltimore Ravens ===
Morrow signed with the Baltimore Ravens on March 6, 2003. He played in 14 games in 2003, making five solo tackles. He was released by the Ravens on September 5, 2004, re-signed on September 9, released again on September 11, and re-signed again on September 16, 2004. Overall, Morrow appeared in 15 games during the 2004 season, totaling 10 solo tackles and one assisted tackle. He was released on March 9, 2005.

=== Arizona Cardinals ===
Morrow was signed by the Arizona Cardinals on June 6, 2005. He played in 14 games for the Cardinals in 2005, accumulating 14 solo tackles and two assisted tackles. He became a free agent after the season.

== Personal life ==
Morrow's nephew, Nathaniel Watson, was drafted by the Cleveland Browns in the 6th round of the 2024 NFL draft.
