= Ainias Smith =

American football player (born 2001)

Profile
- Position: Wide receiver

Personal information
- Born: May 31, 2001 (age 25); Missouri City, Texas, U.S.
- Listed height: 5 ft 9 in (1.75 m)
- Listed weight: 176 lb (80 kg)

Career information
- High school: Dulles (Sugar Land, Texas)
- College: Texas A&M (2019–2023)
- NFL draft: 2024: 5th round, 152nd overall pick

Career history
- Philadelphia Eagles (2024); Carolina Panthers (2025–2026)*
- * Offseason or practice squad member only

Awards and highlights
- Super Bowl champion (LIX); First-team All-SEC (2023)

Career NFL statistics as of 2024
- Rushing yards: 6
- Rushing average: 3
- Receptions: 7
- Receiving yards: 41
- Receiving touchdowns: 1
- Stats at Pro Football Reference

Ainias Smith (born May 31, 2001) is an American professional football wide receiver. He played college football for the Texas A&M Aggies.

== Early life ==
Smith grew up in Missouri City, Texas and attended John Foster Dulles High School in Sugar Land, Texas. In his high school career, he was a starter at wide receiver, running back, cornerback, and occasionally free safety. As a senior, he rushed for 481 yards and 10 touchdowns and caught 55 passes for 717 yards and 10 touchdowns. Smith committed to play college football at Texas A&M over Duke.

== College career ==
As a freshman, Smith played mostly wide receiver and served as the team's primary return specialist and had 22 receptions for 248 yards and three touchdowns. He played running back in the 2019 Texas Bowl and rushed for 54 yards on seven carries in a 24-21 win over Oklahoma State. Smith was moved to running back before the start of his sophomore season, while remaining a flex option at wide receiver. He finished the season with 293 yards and four touchdowns on 49 carries and also caught 43 passes for a team-leading 564 receiving yards with six touchdown receptions.

Smith was named to the watchlist for the Hornung Award going into his junior season. That season, he was selected as a team captain and returned to a primarily wide receiver role, leading the team in receptions. In a win over #1 ranked Alabama, he recorded six receptions for 85 yards and two touchdowns.

He was briefly suspended by the team in July 2022 due to a DWI arrest, but was reinstated after the charges were dropped due to a lack of evidence. After starting the first four games of his senior season, he suffered a leg injury that ended his season. Smith was granted a fifth year of eligibility due to the injury, qualifying as a medical redshirt.

On September 20, 2023, he earned SEC Special Teams Player of the Week honors after returning a punt 82 yards for a touchdown and recording a career-high 202 all-purpose yards against Arkansas, the team he was injured against the year prior. He ended his fifth year leading the Aggies in all-purpose yards (1,204), receiving yards (795), and punt return yards (285), earning him first team All-SEC honors.

=== College statistics ===
Year	Team	Receiving					Rushing					Punt returns				Kick returns			
Year	Team	Rec	Yds	Avg	Lng	TD	Att	Yds	Avg	Lng	TD	Ret	Yds	Avg	TD	Ret	Yds	Avg	TD
2019	Texas A&M	22	248	11.3	30	3	7	54	7.7	19	0	16	190	11.9	0	13	257	19.8	0
2020	Texas A&M	43	564	13.1	54	6	49	293	6.0	38	4	17	75	5.0	0	0	0	0	0
2021	Texas A&M	47	509	10.8	27	6	8	26	3.3	8	0	23	259	11.3	1	0	0	0	0
2022	Texas A&M	15	291	19.4	63	2	3	11	3.7	9	0	8	27	3.4	0	0	0	0	0
2023	Texas A&M	53	795	15.0	42	2	5	21	4.2	11	0	20	285	14.3	1	7	103	14.7	0
Career		180	2,407	13.4	63	19	72	405	5.6	38	4	82	836	10.2	2	20	360	18.0	0

== Professional career ==
Pre-draft measurables
Height	Weight	Arm length	Hand span	Wingspan	40-yard dash	10-yard split	20-yard split	20-yard shuttle	Three-cone drill	Bench press
5 ft 9 3/8 in (1.76 m)	190 lb (86 kg)	29 in (0.74 m)	8 1/2 in (0.22 m)	5 ft 10 1/4 in (1.78 m)	4.56 s	1.57 s	2.60 s	4.27 s	6.86 s	21 reps
All values from NFL Combine/Pro Day

=== Philadelphia Eagles ===
Smith was selected by the Philadelphia Eagles with the 152nd pick in the fifth round of the 2024 NFL draft. He was placed on injured reserve on August 27, 2024. He was activated on October 26. Smith made his debut against the Jacksonville Jaguars. He caught one pass for no gain and rushed once for two yards. On January 5, in a week 18 matchup against the New York Giants, Smith caught the first touchdown of his NFL career on a pass from quarterback Tanner McKee. He won a Super Bowl championship when the Eagles defeated the Kansas City Chiefs 40–22 in Super Bowl LIX.

On August 26, 2025, Smith was waived by the Eagles as part of final roster cuts.

=== Carolina Panthers ===
On August 28, 2025, Smith was signed to the Carolina Panthers' practice squad. He signed a reserve/future contract with Carolina on January 12, 2026. Smith was waived by the Panthers on August 4.

== NFL career statistics ==
Legend
**Bold**	Career High

Year	Team	Games		Receiving					Rushing					Fumbles	
Year	Team	GP	GS	Rec	Yds	Avg	Lng	TD	Att	Yds	Avg	Lng	TD	Fum	Lost
2024	PHI	7	1	7	41	5.9	15	1	2	6	3.0	4	0	0	0
Career		7	1	7	41	5.9	15	1	2	6	3.0	4	0	0	0

== Personal life ==
Smith is the younger brother of NFL defensive back Maurice Smith. On July 20, 2022, Smith was arrested into Brazos County, Texas on three charges: unlawful carrying of a weapon, driving while intoxicated, and possession of marijuana. He was released the same day after posting $8,000 bail, and the charges were dropped 9 days later by the Brazos county attorney due to a lack of evidence.
