= Jeremy Crawshaw =

Australian American football player (born 2001)

- Crawshaw with the Denver Broncos in 2026

No. 16 – Denver Broncos
- Position: Punter
- Roster status: Active

Personal information
- Born: 22 May 2001 (age 25); Penrith, New South Wales, Australia
- Listed height: 6 ft 3 in (1.91 m)
- Listed weight: 205 lb (93 kg)

Career information
- College: Florida (2020–2024)
- NFL draft: 2025: 6th round, 216th overall pick

Career history
- Denver Broncos (2025–present)

Awards and highlights
- PFWA All-Rookie Team (2025); Second-team All-SEC (2023)

Career NFL statistics as of Week 7, 2026
- Punts: 111
- Punting yards: 5,324
- Punting average: 48
- Inside 20: 46
- Touchbacks: 11
- Tackles: 1
- Stats at Pro Football Reference

Jeremy Crawshaw (born 22 May 2001) is an Australian professional American football punter for the Denver Broncos of the National Football League (NFL). He played college football for the Florida Gators and was selected by the Broncos in the sixth round of the 2025 NFL draft.

== Early life ==
Crawshaw was born on 22 May 2001 in Penrith, New South Wales, Australia. He grew up in the Sydney suburb of Emu Plains and played rugby league growing up. A winger, he grew up hoping to play for the local Penrith Panthers. However, after being unsuccessful in his dream of playing for the Panthers, he decided to change sports. He played Australian rules football for a time and after attending high school in Emu Plains, Crawshaw entered Nathan Chapman's ProKick Australia academy, created to develop American football kickers and punters. From there, he attracted the interest of college football teams in the U.S. to play punter, and in May 2019, he committed to the Florida Gators football team. 247Sports ranked him as the seventh-best punter recruit in the class of 2020.

== College career ==
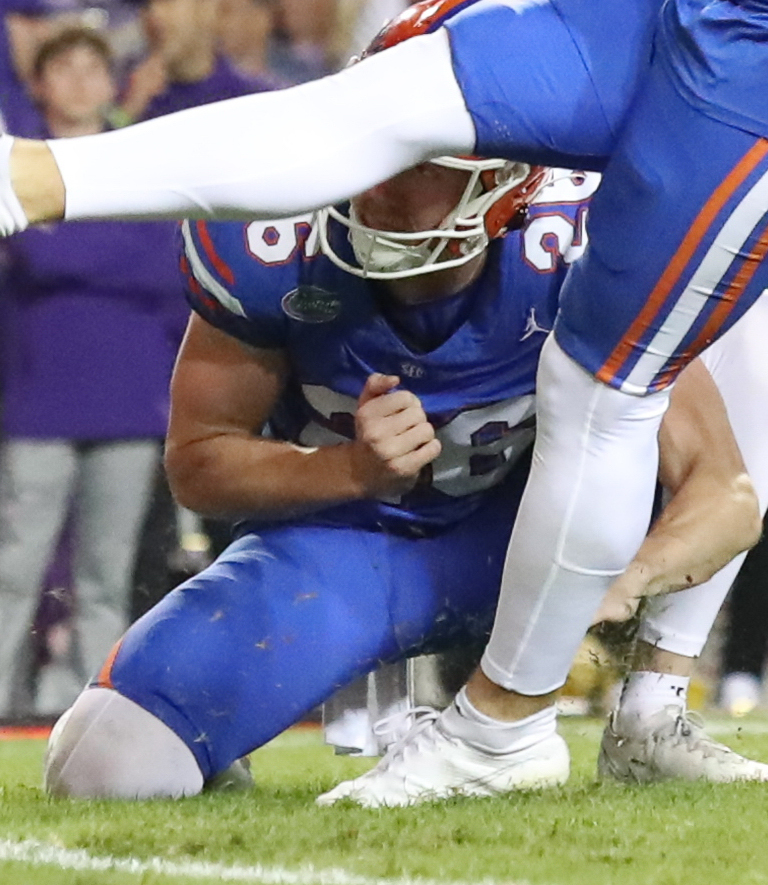
Crawshaw with the Florida Gators in 2023

Crawshaw was backup to Jacob Finn as a freshman for Florida in 2020 and redshirted. He appeared in two games and punted twice for 98 yards. He won a starting role in the 2021 season. That year, he played in all 13 games and punted 52 times, averaging 44.1 yards per punt while having 20 punts inside the 20 yard line, 20 punts of over 50 yards and a long of 69 yards. He was named to the Southeastern Conference (SEC) All-Freshman team for his performance. He then averaged 47.9 yards per punt in 2022 with a long of 67.

In 2023, Crawshaw punted 42 times and averaged 48.9 yards per punt, setting the school record, while having seven punts of over 60 yards and a long of 68. He was named second-team All-SEC for the 2023 season. He served as a team captain as a senior in 2024 and averaged 45.8 yards per punt, having 25 downed inside the 20 yard line, while being named honorable mention All-American by College Football Network. He concluded his collegiate career with a school record 46.4 yards per punt and was invited to the 2025 Senior Bowl.

== Professional career ==
Pre-draft measurables
Height	Weight	Arm length	Hand span	Wingspan
6 ft 3 5/8 in (1.92 m)	198 lb (90 kg)	33 in (0.84 m)	9 1/8 in (0.23 m)	6 ft 7 7/8 in (2.03 m)
All values from NFL Combine

Crawshaw was selected by the Denver Broncos in the sixth round (216th overall) of the 2025 NFL draft. He was the lone punter selected in the draft. After a strong season, Crawshaw was named to the PFWA All-Rookie Team.

== NFL career statistics ==
Legend
	Led the league
**Bold**	Career high

=== Regular season ===
Year	Team	GP	Punting							
Year	Team	GP	Punts	Yds	Lng	Avg	Net Avg	Blk	Ins20	RetY
2025	DEN	**17**	**75**	**3,573**	**76**	**47.6**	**41.1**	0	**30**	**308**
2026	DEN	6	32	1,568	68	49.0	44.7	0	14	406
Career		23	107	5,141	76	49.0	44.7	0	30	714

=== Postseason ===
Year	Team	GP	Punting							
Year	Team	GP	Punts	Yds	Lng	Avg	Net Avg	Blk	Ins20	RetY
2025	DEN	**2**	**10**	**497**	**65**	**49.7**	**43.5**	0	**5**	**2**
Career		2	10	497	65	49.7	43.5	0	5	2
