= Shemar Stewart =

American football player (born 2003)

No. 94 – Cincinnati Bengals
- Position: Defensive end
- Roster status: Active

Personal information
- Born: November 12, 2003 (age 22)
- Listed height: 6 ft 5 in (1.96 m)
- Listed weight: 267 lb (121 kg)

Career information
- High school: Monsignor Pace (Miami)
- College: Texas A&M (2022–2024)
- NFL draft: 2025: 1st round, 17th overall pick

Career history
- Cincinnati Bengals (2025–present)

Career NFL statistics as of Week 6, 2026
- Tackles: 14
- Sacks: 2
- Pass deflections: 1
- Stats at Pro Football Reference

Shemar Stewart (born November 12, 2003) is an American professional football defensive end for the Cincinnati Bengals of the National Football League (NFL). He played college football at Texas A&M and was selected by the Bengals in the first round of the 2025 NFL draft.

== Early life ==
Stewart was born on November 12, 2003, in Miami, Florida. He was raised in Miramar, Florida, and attended Monsignor Edward Pace High School in Miami Gardens. He was rated as one of the top recruits in the 2022 college football recruiting class, receiving the No. 7 rating from ESPN, No. 9 from 247Sports, and No. 12 from USA Today. He was also rated as the top edge rusher in the 2022 recruiting class. He received a scholarship from Texas A&M University and committed in February 2022. Stewart declared for the 2025 NFL draft in December 2024.

== Professional career ==
Pre-draft measurables
Height	Weight	Arm length	Hand span	Wingspan	40-yard dash	10-yard split	20-yard split	Vertical jump	Broad jump
6 ft 5 in (1.96 m)	267 lb (121 kg)	34 1/8 in (0.87 m)	9 5/8 in (0.24 m)	7 ft 0 3/4 in (2.15 m)	4.59 s	1.58 s	2.66 s	40.0 in (1.02 m)	10 ft 11 in (3.33 m)
All values from NFL Combine

Stewart was drafted in the first round with the 17th overall pick by the Cincinnati Bengals in the 2025 NFL draft. Although he reported to mandatory rookie minicamp, Stewart refused to participate in on-field drills until he and the Bengals came to an agreement on his contract and would not sign a Rookie Participation Agreement (RPA). He publicly criticized the team the contract negotiations, specifically with the Bengals front office attempting to insert language that would affect guaranteed money Stewart would earn in the future. Stewart would eventually leave minicamp early.

On July 21, 2025, Bengals owner, Mike Brown, stated the contract dispute centered around Stewart still being paid his full guarantees should he potentially engage in conduct detrimental to the team. Brown would elaborate saying, “His agent wants it to be so that if he acted in a terrible fashion -- this is all hypothetical -- something that rises to the level of going to prison, that we would be on the line for the guarantees for the future years that haven't been paid. And our position is no, if that happens, we're not going to be. We're not going to be paying someone who's sitting in jail. That's not what we're going to do."

On July 26, 2025, Stewart signed a fully guaranteed four-year contract with updated contract language, making him the last of the Bengals' 2025 rookie class to officially be signed and the last first round pick of the 2025 NFL draft to be signed in the league.

On November 15, 2025, Stewart was placed on injured reserve due to a knee injury he suffered in Week 9 against the Chicago Bears. He was activated on December 19, ahead of the team's Week 16 matchup against the Miami Dolphins.
