= Smoke Bouie =

American football player (born 2001)

No. 31
- Position: Defensive back

Personal information
- Born: November 28, 2001 (age 24); Bainbridge, Georgia, U.S.
- Listed height: 5 ft 11 in (1.80 m)
- Listed weight: 180 lb (82 kg)

Career information
- High school: Bainbridge
- College: Texas A&M (2022)
- Stats at ESPN

Deyon "Smoke" Bouie is an American former football defensive back. Bouie began his college career with Texas A&M before transferring to Georgia in 2023.

== Early life ==
Bouie attended Bainbridge High School in Bainbridge, Georgia. During his high school career, Bouie recorded 65 total tackles and 11 interceptions, while also tallying 2,181 yards and 18 touchdowns as a wide receiver. A four-star recruit, Bouie was originally committed to Georgia, before committing to play college football at Texas A&M University.

== College career ==
=== Texas A&M ===
As a freshman in 2022, Bouie appeared in seven games, totaling four tackles. Bouie was suspended from a game against the Miami Hurricanes, after violating the team's curfew rules. He entered the NCAA transfer portal after the conclusion of the regular season.

=== Georgia ===
On January 13, 2023, Bouie announced he would be transferring to the University of Georgia to play for the Georgia Bulldogs. On July 18, 2023, Bouie was revealed to no longer be on Georgia's roster. On August 19, Bouie formally entered the transfer portal for the second time.

== Personal life ==
On July 28, 2023, Bouie was arrested and charged with driving with a suspended driver's license and giving false identification to the law enforcement officer.

According to the Georgia Gazette online, he was also arrested on 8/9/2025 for felony probation violation and fugitive from justice.
