= Will Campbell (offensive lineman) =

American football player (born 2004)

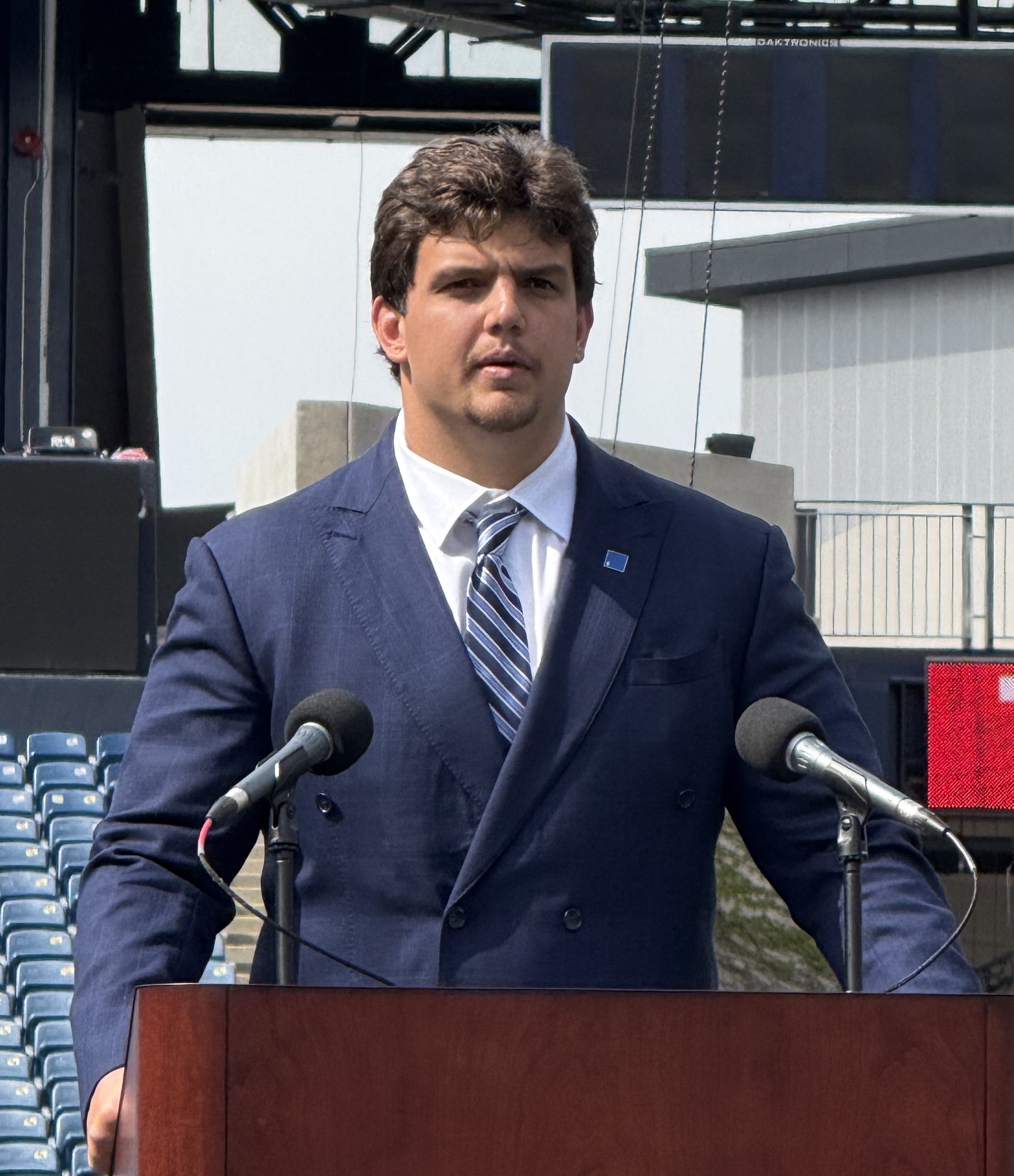
- Campbell in 2025

No. 66 – New England Patriots
- Position: Offensive tackle
- Roster status: Active

Personal information
- Born: January 6, 2004 (age 22); Monroe, Louisiana, U.S.
- Listed height: 6 ft 6 in (1.98 m)
- Listed weight: 319 lb (145 kg)

Career information
- High school: Neville (Monroe, Louisiana)
- College: LSU (2022–2024)
- NFL draft: 2025: 1st round, 4th overall pick

Career history
- New England Patriots (2025–present)

Awards and highlights
- Jacobs Blocking Trophy (2024); Consensus All-American (2024); 2× First-team All-SEC (2023, 2024); Second-team All-SEC (2022)

Career NFL statistics as of Week 3, 2026
- Games played: 16
- Games started: 16
- Stats at Pro Football Reference

William Michael Campbell (born January 6, 2004) is an American professional football offensive tackle for the New England Patriots of the National Football League (NFL). He played college football for the LSU Tigers and was selected by the Patriots fourth overall in the 2025 NFL draft.

== Early life ==
Campbell was born on January 6, 2004, in Monroe, Louisiana. His father Brian "Bull" Campbell played offensive line at East Texas A&M and is a farmer and seed salesman. Campbell attended Neville High School where he started at right tackle as a freshman before moving to left tackle, and modeled his game after fellow Monroe native Andrew Whitworth. Campbell was rated a five-star recruit and was the highest-rated offensive tackle prospect in Louisiana in seven years. He committed to play college football for the Tigers at Louisiana State University (LSU) whom he grew up rooting for.

== College career ==
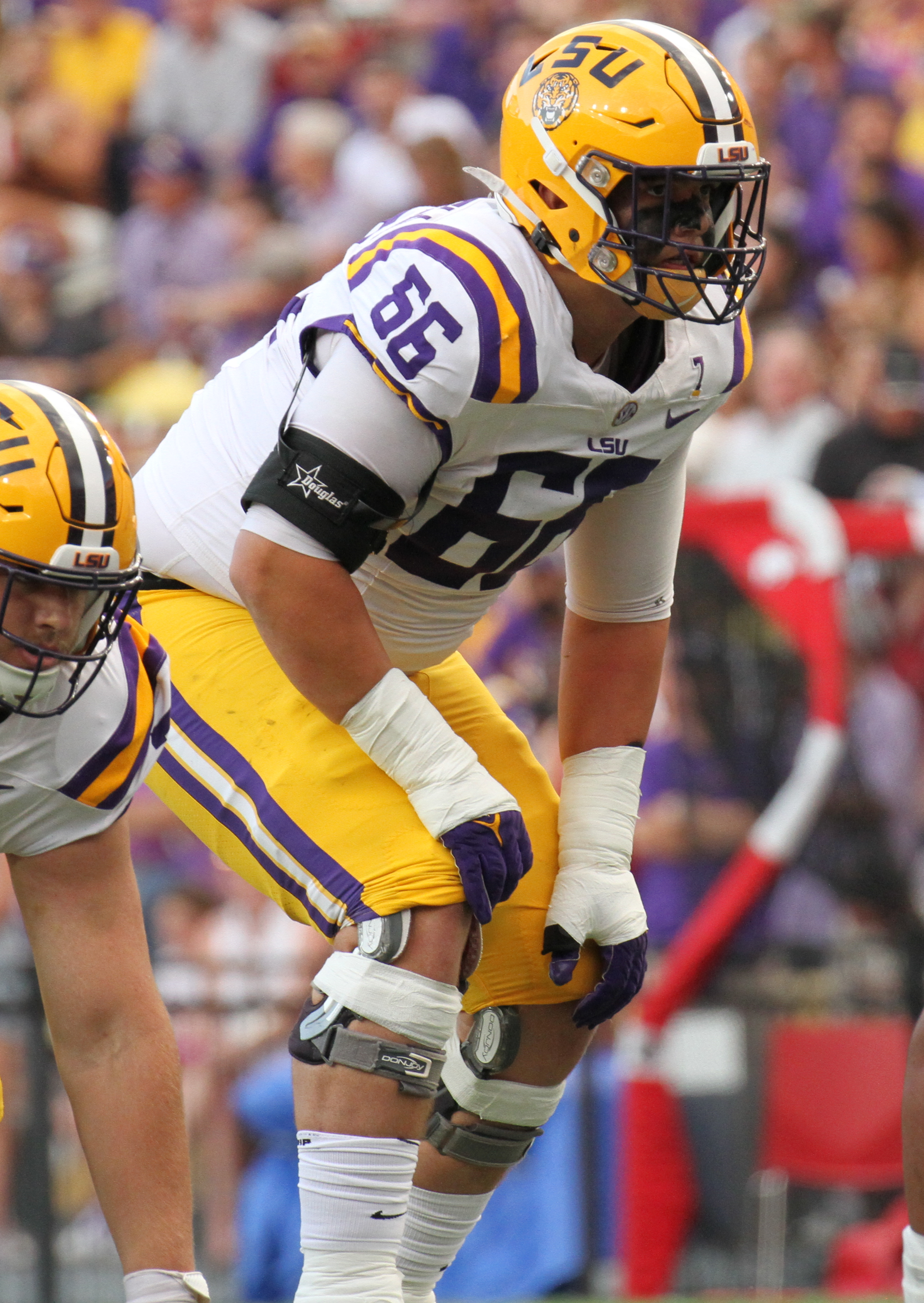
Campbell with the LSU Tigers in 2023

Campbell enrolled early at LSU in January 2022. He was named a starter at offensive tackle entering his true freshman season. Campbell was named a freshman All-American at the end of the season by the Football Writers Association of America (FWAA), and was graded as the second best pass blocker in the nation by Pro Football Focus. He was a first-team 2023 All-SEC football team selection. In 2024, Campbell won the Jacobs Blocking Trophy as the top lineman in the SEC and was a consensus first team All-American. He declared for the 2025 NFL draft following the 2024 season.

== Professional career ==
Pre-draft measurables
Height	Weight	Arm length	Hand span	Wingspan	40-yard dash	10-yard split	20-yard split	Vertical jump	Broad jump
6 ft 5 7/8 in (1.98 m)	319 lb (145 kg)	33 in (0.84 m)	9 1/2 in (0.24 m)	6 ft 5 3/8 in (1.97 m)	4.98 s	1.76 s	2.92 s	32.0 in (0.81 m)	9 ft 5 in (2.87 m)
All values from NFL Combine/Pro Day

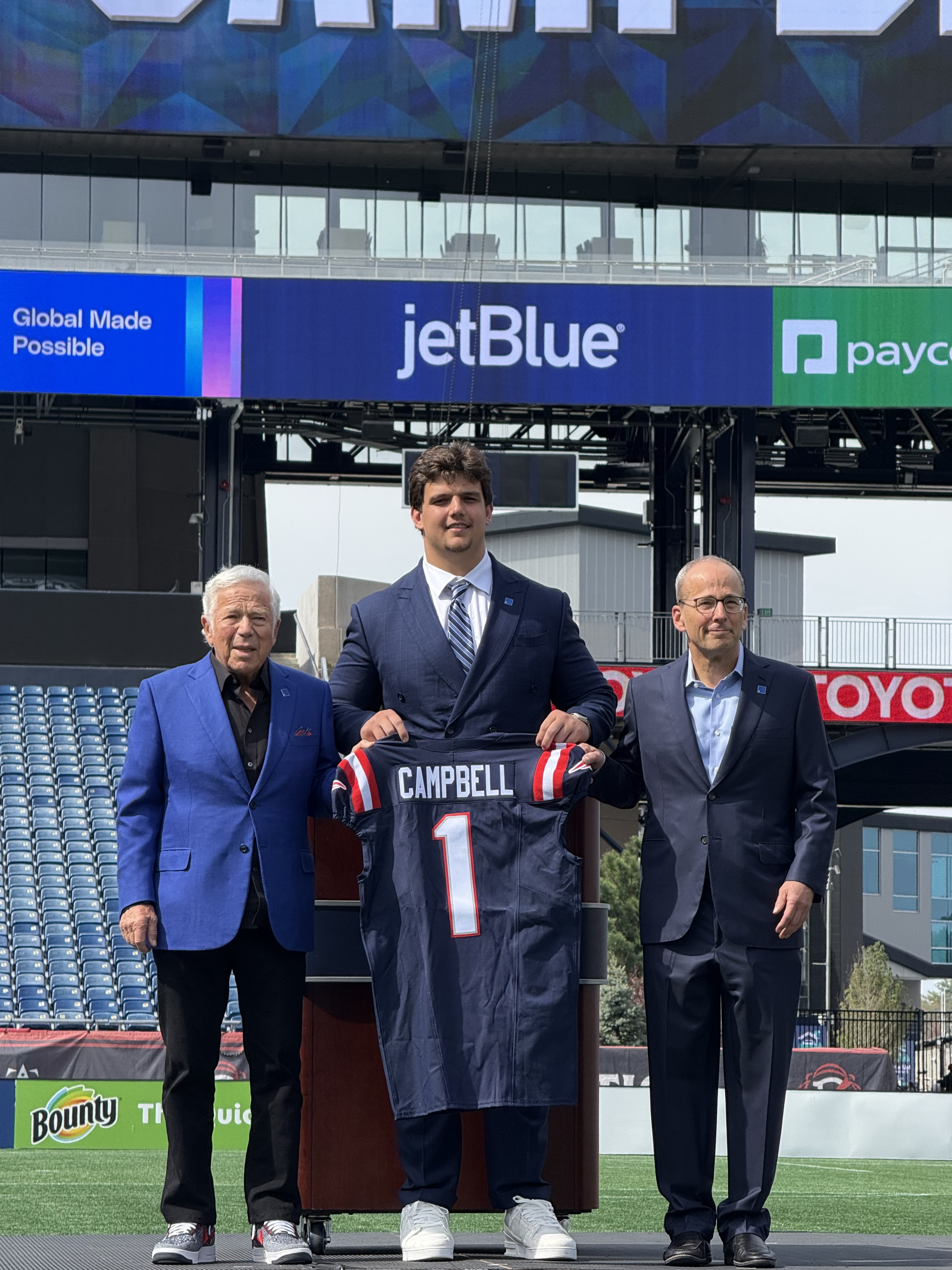
Campbell (center) with New England Patriots owner Robert Kraft (left) and president Jonathan Kraft (right) in 2025

Campbell was selected by the New England Patriots as the fourth overall pick in the 2025 NFL draft. He was the first offensive lineman drafted by the Patriots in the top 10 since John Hannah in 1974. Campbell also became the second LSU offensive lineman to be drafted in the first round, after Alan Faneca in 1998.

In Week 12 against the Cincinnati Bengals, Campbell exited the game in the third quarter due to a knee injury and was carted off the field. The injury was later diagnosed to be a Grade 3 MCL sprain and he was placed on injured reserve on November 26, 2025. Campbell was activated on January 3, 2026, ahead of the team's Week 18 matchup against the Miami Dolphins. In his rookie season, Campbell started 13 games and missed four games to injury. Campbell was the subject of criticism during the postseason, giving up a league-wide season-high 14 pressures in Super Bowl LX. Despite speculation, the Patriots affirmed that he would remain at left tackle for the immediate future.

== Personal life ==
On May 24, 2026, Campbell got engaged to his girlfriend Ashlynn Nussmeier, the daughter of Doug Nussmeier and sister of Campbell's former LSU quarterback Garrett Nussmeier.
