= Denver Harris =

American football safety (born 2003)

No. 2 – UNLV Rebels
- Position: Cornerback
- Class: Redshirt Senior

Personal information
- Born: September 22, 2003 (age 23)
- Listed height: 6 ft 0 in (1.83 m)
- Listed weight: 190 lb (86 kg)

Career information
- High school: North Shore (Harris County, Texas)
- College: Texas A&M (2022); LSU (2023); UTSA (2024); UNLV (2025–present)
- Stats at ESPN

Denver Harris (born September 22, 2003) is an American college football cornerback for the UNLV Rebels. He previously played for the Texas A&M Aggies, the LSU Tigers and the UTSA Roadrunners.

== Early life ==
Harris attended North Shore Senior High School in Harris County, Texas. As a senior he helped North Shore win a state championship in the state's top division and played in the Under Armour All-America Game. A five-star recruit ranked the nation's 23rd overall prospect, he committed to Texas A&M over offers from Alabama, LSU and Texas.

== College career ==
=== Texas A&M ===
Harris started as a freshman and at midseason was named to The Athletic/PFF midseason freshman All-American team. On October 25 it was announced that Harris and teammates Chris Marshall and PJ Williams had been indefinitely suspended from the team following a locker room incident prior to the Aggies loss to South Carolina.

=== LSU ===
On December 22, 2022, Harris announced on Twitter that he would transfer to LSU.

On December 28, 2023, Harris announced that he would enter the transfer portal for the second time.

=== UTSA ===
On February 6, 2024, Harris announced that he would transfer to UTSA.

On December 27, 2024, Harris announced that he would enter the transfer portal for the third time.

=== UNLV ===
On January 14, 2025, Harris announced that he would transfer to UNLV.
