= 2025 Texas Longhorns football team =

American college football season

2025 Texas Longhorns football

Citrus Bowl champion

Citrus Bowl, W 41–27 vs. Michigan
- Conference: Southeastern Conference

Ranking
- Coaches: No. 13
- AP: No. 12
- Record: 10–3 (6–2 SEC)
- Head coach: Steve Sarkisian (5th season)
- Offensive coordinator: Kyle Flood (5th season)
- Co-offensive coordinator: A. J. Milwee (5th season)
- Offensive scheme: Pro spread
- Defensive coordinator: Pete Kwiatkowski (5th season)
- Co-defensive coordinator: Johnny Nansen (2nd season)
- Base defense: Multiple 4–2–5
- Home stadium: Darrell K Royal–Texas Memorial Stadium

Uniform
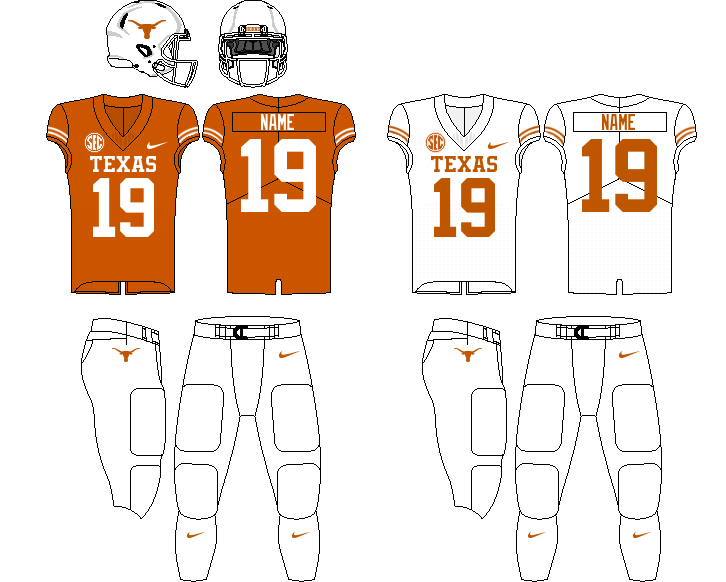

2025 Southeastern Conference football standings
| | Conf. | | | Overall |
| Team | W | | L | W | | L |
|---|---|---|---|---|---|---|
| No. 9 Alabama y^ | 7 | – | 1 | 11 | – | 4 |
| No. 6 Georgia y$^ | 7 | – | 1 | 12 | – | 2 |
| No. 3 Ole Miss ^ | 7 | – | 1 | 13 | – | 2 |
| No. 8 Texas A&M ^ | 7 | – | 1 | 11 | – | 2 |
| No. 13 Oklahoma ^ | 6 | – | 2 | 10 | – | 3 |
| No. 12 Texas | 6 | – | 2 | 10 | – | 3 |
| No. 15 Vanderbilt | 6 | – | 2 | 10 | – | 3 |
| Missouri | 4 | – | 4 | 8 | – | 5 |
| Tennessee | 4 | – | 4 | 8 | – | 5 |
| LSU | 3 | – | 5 | 7 | – | 6 |
| Kentucky | 2 | – | 6 | 5 | – | 7 |
| Florida | 2 | – | 6 | 4 | – | 8 |
| Auburn | 1 | – | 7 | 5 | – | 7 |
| Mississippi State | 1 | – | 7 | 5 | – | 8 |
| South Carolina | 1 | – | 7 | 4 | – | 8 |
| Arkansas | 0 | – | 8 | 2 | – | 10 |
Championship: Georgia 28, Alabama 7
^ – College Football Playoff participant; $ – Conference champion; y – Championship game participant; Rankings from AP Poll

The 2025 Texas Longhorns football team represented the University of Texas at Austin as a member of the Southeastern Conference (SEC) during the 2025 NCAA Division I FBS football season. Led by fifth-year head coach Steve Sarkisian, the Longhorns compiled an overall record of 10–3 with a mark of 6–2 in conference play, placing in a three-way tie for fifth in the SEC. Texas was invited to the Citrus Bowl, where the Longhorns defeated Michigan. The team played home games at Darrell K Royal–Texas Memorial Stadium in Austin, Texas.

Texas came into the season ranked atop the preseason polls. The Longhorns lost their season opener on the road, a highly anticipated game against the defending national champion, Ohio State. Viewership for the game reached 16.1 million, making it the most-watched Week 1 game in college football history. Subsequent losses to Florida and Georgia kept Texas out of the 2025–26 College Football Playoff.

The Texas Longhorns drew an average home attendance of 102,367, the fifth-highest in college football.

== Schedule ==
| Date | Time | Opponent | Rank | Site | TV | Result | Attendance |
|---|---|---|---|---|---|---|---|
| August 30 | 11:00 a.m. | at No. 3 Ohio State* | No. 1 | Ohio Stadium; Columbus, OH (College GameDay, Big Noon Kickoff) | FOX | L 7–14 | 107,524 |
| September 6 | 11:00 a.m. | San Jose State* | No. 7 | Darrell K Royal–Texas Memorial Stadium; Austin, TX | ABC | W 38–7 | 100,841 |
| September 13 | 3:15 p.m. | UTEP* | No. 7 | Darrell K Royal–Texas Memorial Stadium; Austin, TX | SECN | W 27–10 | 102,025 |
| September 20 | 7:00 p.m. | Sam Houston* | No. 8 | Darrell K Royal–Texas Memorial Stadium; Austin, TX | SECN+/ESPN+ | W 55–0 | 103,003 |
| October 4 | 2:30 p.m. | at Florida | No. 9 | Ben Hill Griffin Stadium; Gainesville, FL (SEC Nation) | ESPN | L 21–29 | 90,714 |
| October 11 | 2:30 p.m. | vs. No. 6 Oklahoma | | Cotton Bowl; Dallas, TX (Red River Rivalry) | ABC | W 23–6 | 92,100 |
| October 18 | 6:00 p.m. | at Kentucky | No. 21 | Kroger Field; Lexington, KY | ESPN | W 16–13 ^{OT} | 60,937 |
| October 25 | 3:15 p.m. | at Mississippi State | No. 22 | Davis Wade Stadium; Starkville, MS | SECN | W 45–38 ^{OT} | 52,680 |
| November 1 | 11:00 a.m. | No. 9 Vanderbilt | No. 20 | Darrell K Royal–Texas Memorial Stadium; Austin, TX (SEC Nation) | ABC | W 34–31 | 102,338 |
| November 15 | 6:30 p.m. | at No. 5 Georgia | No. 10 | Sanford Stadium; Athens, GA (SEC Nation) | ABC | L 10–35 | 93,033 |
| November 22 | 2:30 p.m. | Arkansas | No. 17 | Darrell K Royal–Texas Memorial Stadium; Austin, TX (rivalry) | ABC | W 52–37 | 102,361 |
| November 28 | 6:30 p.m. | No. 3 Texas A&M | No. 16 | Darrell K Royal–Texas Memorial Stadium; Austin, TX (rivalry) | ABC/SECN | W 27–17 | 103,632 |
| December 31 | 2:00 p.m. | vs. No. 18 Michigan* | No. 13 | Camping World Stadium; Orlando, FL (Citrus Bowl) | ABC | W 41–27 | 47,316 |
*Non-conference game; Rankings from AP Poll (and CFP Rankings, after November 4) - Released prior to game; All times are in Central time; Source: Texas Sports

== Rankings ==
Ranking movements Legend: ██ Increase in ranking ██ Decrease in ranking RV = Received votes т = Tied with team above or below ( ) = First-place votes
| | Week | | | | | | | | | | | | | | | | |
| Poll | Pre | 1 | 2 | 3 | 4 | 5 | 6 | 7 | 8 | 9 | 10 | 11 | 12 | 13 | 14 | 15 | Final |
|---|---|---|---|---|---|---|---|---|---|---|---|---|---|---|---|---|---|
| AP | 1 (25) | 7 | 7 | 8 | 10 | 9 | RV | 21 | 22 | 20 | 13 | 10 | 17 | 16 | 14 | 14 | 12 |
| Coaches | 1 (28) | 6 | 7 | 7 | 7 | 7 | 19 | 17 | 18 | 19 | 13 | 10т | 18 | 16 | 14 | 14 | 13 |
| CFP | Not released | | | | | | | | | | 11 | 10 | 17 | 16 | 13 | 13 | Not released |

== Preseason ==
=== Award watch lists ===
Listed in the order that they were released

| Award | Name | Position | Year | Source |
|---|---|---|---|---|
| Lott Trophy | Anthony Hill Jr. | LB | Junior | |
| Lott Trophy | Colin Simmons | EDGE | Sophomore | |
| Lott Trophy | Michael Taaffe | DB | Senior | |
| Dodd Award | Steve Sarkisian | HC | -- | |
| Maxwell Award | Arch Manning | QB | Sophomore | |
| Maxwell Award | Quintrevion Wisner | RB | Junior | |
| Outland Trophy | DJ Campbell | OL | Senior | |
| Bronko Nagurski Trophy | Anthony Hill Jr. | LB | Junior | |
| Bronko Nagurski Trophy | Colin Simmons | EDGE | Sophomore | |
| Bronko Nagurski Trophy | Michael Taaffe | DB | Senior | |
| Jim Thorpe Award | Malik Muhammad | DB | Junior | |
| Jim Thorpe Award | Michael Taaffe | DB | Senior | |
| Butkus Award | Anthony Hill Jr. | LB | Junior | |
| Butkus Award | Liona Lefau | LB | Junior | |
| Wuerffel Trophy | Michael Taaffe | DB | Senior | |
| Lou Groza Award | Mason Shipley | K | Senior | |
| Ray Guy Award | Jack Bouwmeester | P | Senior | |
| Walter Camp Award | Anthony Hill Jr. | LB | Junior | |
| Walter Camp Award | Colin Simmons | EDGE | Sophomore | |
| Walter Camp Award | Arch Manning | QB | Sophomore | |
| Doak Walker Award | Quintrevion Wisner | RB | Junior | |
| Doak Walker Award | CJ Baxter | RB | Sophomore | |
| Biletnikoff Award | Jack Endries | TE | Junior | |
| Davey O’Brien Award | Arch Manning | QB | Sophomore | |
| John Mackey Award | Jack Endries | TE | Junior | |
| Chuck Bednarik Award | Anthony Hill Jr. | LB | Junior | |
| Chuck Bednarik Award | Colin Simmons | EDGE | Sophomore | |
| Chuck Bednarik Award | Michael Taaffe | DB | Senior | |
| Lombardi Award | Anthony Hill Jr. | LB | Junior | |
| Lombardi Award | Colin Simmons | EDGE | Sophomore | |
| Lombardi Award | DJ Campbell | OL | Senior | |
| Lombardi Award | Jack Endries | TE | Junior | |
| Polynesian College Football Player of the Year Award | Liona Lefau | LB | Junior | |
| Comeback Player of the Year Award | CJ Baxter | RB | Sophomore | |
| Comeback Player of the Year Award | Christian Clark | RB | Freshman | |
| Johnny Unitas Golden Arm Award | Arch Manning | QB | Sophomore | |
| Earl Campbell Tyler Rose Award | CJ Baxter | RB | Sophomore | |
| Earl Campbell Tyler Rose Award | Quintrevion Wisner | RB | Junior | |
| Earl Campbell Tyler Rose Award | DeAndre Moore Jr. | WR | Junior | |
| Shaun Alexander Freshman of the Year Award | Justus Terry | DL | Freshman | |
| Shaun Alexander Freshman of the Year Award | Kaliq Lockett | WR | Freshman | |

=== Preseason SEC awards ===
2025 Preseason All-SEC teams

==== Media ====
First Team
| Position | Player | Class |
Offense
| RB | Quintrevion Wisner | JR |
| OL | DJ Campbell | SR |
Defense
| EDGE | Colin Simmons | SO |
| LB | Anthony Hill Jr. | JR |
| DB | Michael Taaffe | SR |

Second Team
| Position | Player | Class |
Offense
| WR | Ryan Wingo | SO |
Defense
| DB | Malik Muhammad | JR |
Special Teams
| P | Jack Bouwmeester | SR |

Third Team
| Position | Player | Class |
Offense
| QB | Arch Manning | JR |
| TE | Jack Endries | JR |
| OL | Trevor Goosby | JR |
Defense
| EDGE | Trey Moore | SR |
Special Teams
| K | Will Stone | SR |

==== Coaches ====
First Team
| Position | Player | Class |
Offense
| RB | Quintrevion Wisner | JR |
| OL | DJ Campbell | SR |
Defense
| EDGE | Colin Simmons | SO |
| LB | Anthony Hill Jr. | JR |
| DB | Michael Taaffe | SR |

Second Team
| Position | Player | Class |
Defense
| DB | Malik Muhammad | JR |
Special Teams
| P | Jack Bouwmeester | SR |

Third Team
| Position | Player | Class |
Offense
| OL | Trevor Goosby | JR |
Defense
| EDGE | Trey Moore | SR |
Special Teams
| K | Will Stone | SR |

=== Preseason All-Americans ===
Pre-season All-American Honors
| Player | Position | Class | Designation | AP | CBS Sports | ESPN | PFF | SI | SN | WCFF |
|---|---|---|---|---|---|---|---|---|---|---|
| Anthony Hill Jr. | LB | Junior | 1st Team Defense (AP); 1st Team Defense (CBS); 1st Team Defense (ESPN); 1st Team Defense (PFF); 1st Team Defense (SI); 1st Team Defense (SN); 1st Team Defense (WCFF) | ✓ | ✓ | ✓ | ✓ | ✓ | ✓ | ✓ |
| Colin Simmons | EDGE | Sophomore | 1st Team Defense (AP); 1st Team Defense (CBS); 2nd Team Defense (PFF); 1st Team Defense (PFF); 1st Team Defense (SI); 2nd Team Defense (SN); 1st Team Defense (WCFF) | ✓ | ✓ | ✓ | ✓ | ✓ | ✓ | ✓ |
| Michael Taaffe | DB | Senior | 1st Team Defense (AP); 1st Team Defense (ESPN); 1st Team Defense (SN); 2nd Team Defense (WCFF) | ✓ | – | ✓ | – | – | ✓ | ✓ |
| Arch Manning | QB | Sophomore | 1st Team Offense (SN) | – | – | – | – | – | ✓ | – |
| Quintrevion Wisner | RB | Junior | 2nd Team Offense (SN) | – | – | – | – | – | ✓ | – |

== Game summaries ==
=== at No. 3 Ohio State ===
No. 1 Texas Longhorns (0–0) at No. 3 Ohio State Buckeyes (0–0) – Game summary

| Quarter | 1 | 2 | 3 | 4 | Total |
|---|---|---|---|---|---|
| No. 1 Longhorns | 0 | 0 | 0 | 7 | 7 |
| No. 3 Buckeyes | 0 | 7 | 0 | 7 | 14 |

at Ohio Stadium • Columbus, Ohio

- Date: August 30
- Game time: 11:00 a.m.
- Game weather: Sunny
- Game attendance: 107,524
- Referee: David Smith
- TV announcers (FOX): Gus Johnson (play-by-play), Joel Klatt (analyst), Jenny Taft, and Tom Rinaldi (sideline reporters)

Game information

First quarter

- No scoring

Second quarter

- (8:57) Ohio State - CJ Donaldson Jr. 1-yard run (Jayden Fielding kick), (Drive: 13 plays, 80 yards, 8:01; Ohio State 7–0)

Third quarter

- No scoring

Fourth quarter

- (13:08) Ohio State - Carnell Tate 40-yard pass from Julian Sayin (Jayden Fielding kick), (Drive: 7 plays, 68 yards, 4:53; Ohio State 14–0)
- (3:28) Texas - Parker Livingstone 32-yard pass from Arch Manning (Mason Shipley kick), (Drive: 4 plays, 60 yards, 0:42; Ohio State 14–7)

On August 30 the Longhorns opened the season on the road at Ohio State. It was the 5th meeting between the two programs. The game was a rematch of the 2025 Cotton Bowl Playoff Semifinal which Ohio State had won 28-14. The Longhorns were the consensus preseason No. 1 team while the Buckeyes were No. 2 in the Coaches Poll and No. 3 in the AP Poll, meaning this was the first time in history that the number 1 and 2 teams faced each other in week one.

Texas received the opening kick and drove all the way to the OSU 43-yardline before turning the ball over on downs. The game remained scoreless until the second quarter when the Buckeyes drove 80-yards in 13 plays to score the first touchdown of the game, taking the lead 7-0. Early in the third quarter Texas looked poised to respond, having driven 70 yards to the OSU 1-yardline but elected to go for it on 4th & goal, failing to convert. On the ensuing drive it appeared that the Longhorns had scored a safety when a Buckeyes offensive lineman was called for holding in the endzone, but an offsetting penalty allowed them to punt the ball away.

On Texas' next drive they turned the ball over again after quarterback Arch Manning's pass was intercepted by Jermaine Mathews Jr. At the start of the fourth quarter Ohio State used this momentum to drive 68 yards for the game's second touchdown, a 40-yard pass from Julian Sayin to Carnell Tate to extend the lead 14-0. Texas again drove the length of the field and yet again elected to go for it on fourth & short, this time from the OSU 9-yardline. Manning's ensuing pass fell incomplete, intended for freshman receiver Parker Livingstone. On Texas' next possession with 3:28 left in the game, Manning found Livingstone in the endzone for a 32-yard passing touchdown that was confirmed with replay, cutting the Horns deficit to 7. After forcing a three-and-out the Longhorns had the ball with 2:26 to go in the game. They drove to the 50-yardline but again, failed to convert on a critical fourth down attempt, after which the Buckeyes ran out the clock to seal the 14–7 victory.

The victory propelled the Buckeyes to consensus No. 1 in both the AP and Coaches poll. The Longhorns fell to No. 7 in the AP and No. 6 in the Coaches polls. The loss was Texas' first opening season loss since 2018 versus Maryland and the first time a No. 1 team had lost their season opener since the 1990 Miami Hurricanes.

| Statistics | TEX | OSU |
|---|---|---|
| First downs | 16 | 11 |
| Plays–yards | 67–336 | 54–203 |
| Rushes–yards | 37–166 | 34–77 |
| Passing yards | 170 | 126 |
| Passing: comp–att–int | 17–30–1 | 13–20–0 |
| Turnovers | 1 | 0 |
| Time of possession | 27:55 | 32:05 |

| Team | Category | Player | Statistics |
|---|---|---|---|
| Texas | Passing | Arch Manning | 17–30, 170 yards, TD, INT |
| Texas | Rushing | Quintrevion Wisner | 16 carries, 80 yards |
| Texas | Receiving | Jack Endries | 4 receptions, 50 yards |
| Ohio State | Passing | Julian Sayin | 13–20, 126 yards, TD |
| Ohio State | Rushing | CJ Donaldson | 19 carries, 67 yards, TD |
| Ohio State | Receiving | Carnell Tate | 2 receptions, 49 yards, TD |

=== vs San Jose State ===
San Jose State Spartans (0–1) at No. 7 Texas Longhorns (0–1) – Game summary

| Quarter | 1 | 2 | 3 | 4 | Total |
|---|---|---|---|---|---|
| Spartans | 0 | 7 | 0 | 0 | 7 |
| No. 7 Longhorns | 14 | 14 | 10 | 0 | 38 |

at Darrell K Royal–Texas Memorial Stadium • Austin, Texas

- Date: September 6
- Game time: 11:00 a.m.
- Game weather: Cloudy • Temperature: 82 °F (28 °C)
- Game attendance: 100,841
- Referee: Daniel Gautreaux
- TV announcers (ABC): Joe Tessitore (play-by-play), Jesse Palmer (analyst), and Katie George (sideline reporter)

Game information

First quarter

- (2:52) TEX – Parker Livingstone 83-yard pass from Arch Manning (Mason Shipley kick), (Drive: 3 plays, 90 yards, 1:18; Texas 7–0)
- (0:12) TEX – Parker Livingstone 3-yard pass from Arch Manning (Mason Shipley kick), (Drive: 5 plays, 34 yards, 2:32; Texas 14–0)

Second quarter

- (14:45) TEX – Jack Endries 36-yard pass from Arch Manning (Mason Shipley kick), (Drive: 1 play, 36 yards, 0:08; Texas 21–0)
- (12:56) TEX – Jack Endries 16-yard pass from Arch Manning (Mason Shipley kick), (Drive: 2 plays, 1 yard, 0:25; Texas 28–0)
- (8:19) SJSU – Jabari Bates 4-yard run (Denis Lynch kick), (Drive: 8 plays, 75 yards, 4:37; Texas 28–7)

Third quarter

- (10:50) TEX – Mason Shipley 47-yard field goal (Drive: 7 plays, 32 yards, 3:13; Texas 31–7)
- (0:43) TEX – Arch Manning 20-yard run (Mason Shipley kick), (Drive: 6 plays, 63 yards, 3:30; Texas 38–7)

Fourth quarter

No scoring plays

| Statistics | SJSU | TEX |
|---|---|---|
| First downs | 16 | 18 |
| Plays–yards | 72–273 | 65–472 |
| Rushes–yards | 29–85 | 32–155 |
| Passing yards | 188 | 317 |
| Passing: comp–att–int | 21–43–1 | 21–33–1 |
| Turnovers | 4 | 2 |
| Time of possession | 29:45 | 30:15 |

| Team | Category | Player | Statistics |
|---|---|---|---|
| San Jose State | Passing | Walker Eget | 21–42, 188 yards, INT |
| San Jose State | Rushing | Jabari Bates | 10 carries, 44 yards, TD |
| San Jose State | Receiving | Kyri Shoels | 8 receptions, 73 yards |
| Texas | Passing | Arch Manning | 19–30, 295 yards, 4 TD, INT |
| Texas | Rushing | CJ Baxter | 13 carries, 64 yards |
| Texas | Receiving | Parker Livingstone | 4 receptions, 128 yards, 2 TD |

=== vs UTEP ===
UTEP Miners (1–1) at No. 7 Texas Longhorns (1–1) – Game summary

| Quarter | 1 | 2 | 3 | 4 | Total |
|---|---|---|---|---|---|
| Miners | 0 | 3 | 0 | 7 | 10 |
| No. 7 Longhorns | 7 | 7 | 6 | 7 | 27 |

at Darrell K Royal–Texas Memorial Stadium • Austin, Texas

- Date: September 13
- Game time: 3:15 p.m.
- Game weather: Sunny • Temperature: 93 °F (34 °C)
- Game attendance: 102,205
- Referee: Lee Hedrick
- TV announcers (SECN+/ESPN+): Dave Neal (play-by-play), Fozzy Whittaker (analyst), and Morgan Uber (sideline reporter)

Game information

First quarter

- (5:26) TEX – Arch Manning 2-yard run (Mason Shipley kick), (Drive: 9 plays, 53 yards, 4:56; Texas 7–0)

Second quarter

- (1:55) UTEP – Carlos Arreola 39-yard field goal (Drive: 7 plays, 66 yards, 2:10; Texas 7–3)
- (0:01) TEX – Arch Manning 5-yard run (Mason Shipley kick), (Drive: 7 plays, 40 yards, 0:53; Texas 14–3)

Third quarter

- (7:50) TEX – Mason Shipley 31-yard field goal (Drive: 9 plays, 25 yards, 4:55; Texas 17–3)
- (1:41) TEX – Mason Shipley 30-yard field goal (Drive: 10 plays, 37 yards, 5:00; Texas 20–3)

Fourth quarter

- (10:52) TEX – Ryan Wingo 4-yard pass from Arch Manning (Mason Shipley kick), (Drive: 8 plays, 47 yards, 3:40; Texas 27–3)
- (1:57) UTEP – Shay Smith 2-yard run (Carlos Arreolay kick), (Drive: 7 plays, 87 yards, 2:56; Texas 27–10)

| Statistics | UTEP | TEX |
|---|---|---|
| First downs | 13 | 23 |
| Plays–yards | 59–259 | 81–340 |
| Rushes–yards | 23–50 | 56–226 |
| Passing yards | 209 | 114 |
| Passing: comp–att–int | 24–36–2 | 11–25–1 |
| Turnovers | 2 | 1 |
| Time of possession | 23:13 | 36:47 |

| Team | Category | Player | Statistics |
|---|---|---|---|
| UTEP | Passing | Malachi Nelson | 24/36, 209 yards, 2 INT |
| UTEP | Rushing | Hahsaun Wilson | 6 carries, 39 yards |
| UTEP | Receiving | Trevon Tate | 6 receptions, 64 yards |
| Texas | Passing | Arch Manning | 11/25, 114 yards, TD, INT |
| Texas | Rushing | James Simon | 17 carries, 67 yards |
| Texas | Receiving | Ryan Wingo | 3 receptions, 32 yards, TD |

=== vs Sam Houston ===
Sam Houston Bearkats (0–3) at No. 8 Texas Longhorns (2–1) – Game summary

| Quarter | 1 | 2 | 3 | 4 | Total |
|---|---|---|---|---|---|
| Bearkats | 0 | 0 | 0 | 0 | 0 |
| No. 8 Longhorns | 14 | 17 | 17 | 7 | 55 |

at Darrell K Royal–Texas Memorial Stadium • Austin, Texas

- Date: September 20
- Game time: 7:00 p.m.
- Game weather:
- Game attendance: 103,003
- Referee: Jason Autrey
- TV announcers (SECN+/ESPN+): Clay Matvick (play-by-play), Chase Daniel (analyst), and Tori Petry (sideline reporter)

Game information

First quarter

- (6:23) TEX – Jerrick Gibson 13-yard run (Mason Shipley kick), (Drive: 12 plays, 76 yards, 5:29; Texas 7–0)
- (0:45) TEX – Arch Manning 5-yard run (Mason Shipley kick), (Drive: 9 plays, 60 yards, 3:57; Texas 14–0)

Second quarter

- (12:50) TEX – Jordan Washington 32-yard pass from Arch Manning (Mason Shipley kick), (Drive: 3 plays, 70 yards, 1:15; Texas 21–0)
- (5:50) TEX – Mason Shipley 29-yard field goal (Drive: 7 plays, 60 yards, 4:15; Texas 24–0)
- (1:25) TEX – Arch Manning 2-yard run (Mason Shipley kick), (Drive: 7 plays, 70 yards, 2:47; Texas 31–0)

Third quarter

- (13:51) TEX – Ryan Wingo 53-yard pass from Arch Manning (Mason Shipley kick), (Drive: 3 plays, 75 yards, 1:03; Texas 38–0)
- (10:46) TEX – Ryan Wingo 13-yard pass from Arch Manning (Mason Shipley kick), (Drive: 4 plays, 25 yards, 1:24; Texas 45–0)
- (4:54) TEX – Mason Shipley 38-yard field goal (Drive: 7 plays, 21 yards, 3:05; Texas 48–0)

Fourth quarter

- (13:22) TEX – Christian Clark 5-yard run (Mason Shipley kick), (Drive: 8 plays, 91 yards, 3:39; Texas 55–0)

| Statistics | SHSU | TEX |
|---|---|---|
| First downs | 7 | 26 |
| Plays–yards | 51–113 | 69–607 |
| Rushes–yards | 26–27 | 41–264 |
| Passing yards | 86 | 343 |
| Passing: comp–att–int | 13–25–1 | 23–28–0 |
| Turnovers | 1 | 0 |
| Time of possession | 26:09 | 33:51 |

| Team | Category | Player | Statistics |
|---|---|---|---|
| Sam Houston | Passing | Hunter Wilson | 13–25, 86 yards, INT |
| Sam Houston | Rushing | Hunter Watson | 15 carries, 32 yards |
| Sam Houston | Receiving | Landan Brown | 6 receptions, 37 yards |
| Texas | Passing | Arch Manning | 18–21, 309 yards, 3 TD |
| Texas | Rushing | Christian Clark | 13 rushes, 62 yards, TD |
| Texas | Receiving | Ryan Wingo | 4 receptions, 93 yards, 2 TD |

=== at Florida ===
No. 9 Texas Longhorns (3–1) at Florida Gators (1–3) – Game summary

| Quarter | 1 | 2 | 3 | 4 | Total |
|---|---|---|---|---|---|
| No. 9 Longhorns | 0 | 7 | 7 | 7 | 21 |
| Gators | 10 | 9 | 10 | 0 | 29 |

at Ben Hill Griffin Stadium • Gainesville, Florida

- Date: October 4
- Game time: 2:30 p.m.
- Game weather: Sunny • Temperature: 82 °F (28 °C) • Wind: NE 7 mph
- Game attendance: 90,714
- Referee: James Carter
- TV announcers (ESPN): Bob Wischusen (play-by-play), Louis Riddick (analyst), and Kris Budden (sideline reporter)

Game information

First quarter

- (7:58) FLA – Jadan Baugh 5-yard run (Trey Smack kick), (Drive: 13 plays, 84 yards, 6:52; Florida 7–0)
- (1:00) FLA – Trey Smack 34-yard field goal (Drive: 10 plays, 64 yards, 4:12; Florida 10–0)

Second quarter

- (9:55) TEX – Quintrevion Wisner 6-yard pass from Arch Manning (Mason Shipley kick), (Drive: 4 plays, 45 yards, 2:11; Florida 10–7)
- (4:55) FLA – Dallas Wilson 13-yard pass from DJ Lagway (Trey Smack kick), (Drive: 10 plays, 77 yards, 4:57; Florida 17–7)
- (3:52) FLA – Team safety (Drive: 3 plays, 1 yard, 1:03; Florida 19–7)

Third quarter

- (5:37) FLA – Trey Smack 38-yard field goal (Drive: 5 plays, 60 yards, 3:13; Florida 22–7)
- (2:43) TEX – Ryan Wingo 38-yard pass from Arch Manning (Mason Shipley kick), (Drive: 6 plays, 75 yards, 2:54; Florida 22–14)
- (0:38) FLA – Dallas Wilson 55-yard pass from DJ Lagway (Trey Smack kick), (Drive: 5 plays, 75 yards, 2:05; Florida 29–14)

Fourth quarter

- (3:20) FLA – Quintrevion Wisner 1-yard run (Mason Shipley kick), (Drive: 5 plays, 69 yards, 1:30; Florida 29–21)

| Statistics | TEX | FLA |
|---|---|---|
| First downs | 16 | 22 |
| Plays–yards | 58–341 | 65–457 |
| Rushes–yards | 26–58 | 37–159 |
| Passing yards | 289 | 298 |
| Passing: comp–att–int | 17–32–2 | 21–28–2 |
| Turnovers | 2 | 2 |
| Time of possession | 25:53 | 34:07 |

| Team | Category | Player | Statistics |
|---|---|---|---|
| Texas | Passing | Arch Manning | 16–29, 263 yards, 2 TD, 2 INT |
| Texas | Rushing | Arch Manning | 15 carries, 37 yards |
| Texas | Receiving | DeAndre Moore Jr. | 3 receptions, 75 yards |
| Florida | Passing | DJ Lagway | 21–28, 298 yards, 2 TD, INT |
| Florida | Rushing | Jadan Baugh | 27 carries, 107 yards, TD |
| Florida | Receiving | Dallas Wilson | 6 receptions, 111 yards, 2 TD |

=== vs. No. 6 Oklahoma (Red River Rivalry) ===
No. 6 Oklahoma Sooners (5–0) vs. Texas Longhorns (3–2) – Game summary

| Quarter | 1 | 2 | 3 | 4 | Total |
|---|---|---|---|---|---|
| No. 6 Sooners | 3 | 3 | 0 | 0 | 6 |
| Longhorns | 0 | 3 | 10 | 10 | 23 |

at Cotton Bowl • Dallas, Texas

- Date: October 11
- Game time: 2:30 p.m.
- Game weather: Sunny • Temperature: 89 °F
- Game attendance: 92,100
- Referee: David Smith
- TV announcers (ABC): Chris Fowler (play-by-play), Kirk Herbstreit (analyst), and Holly Rowe (sideline)

Game information

First quarter

- (11:49) OU – Tate Sandell 42-yard field goal (Drive: 9 plays, 52 yards, 3:11; OU 3–0)

Second quarter

- (9:09) OU – Tate Sandell 41-yard field goal (Drive: 12 plays, 40 yards, 6:23; OU 6–0)
- (4:29) TEX – Mason Shipley 22-yard field goal (Drive: 12 plays, 75 yards, 4:45; OU 6–3)

Third quarter

- (7:49) TEX – DeAndre Moore Jr. 12-yard pass from Arch Manning, Mason Shipley kick (Drive: 14 plays, 75 yards, 7:11; TEX 10–6)
- (0:21) TEX – Mason Shipley 48-yard field goal (Drive: 13 plays, 65 yards, 6:21; TEX 13–6)

Fourth quarter

- (9:54) TEX – Ryan Niblett 75-yard punt return, Mason Shipley kick (Drive: 4 plays, -11 yards, 1:39; TEX 20–6)
- (2:59) TEX – Mason Shipley 39-yard field goal (Drive: 7 plays, 42 yards, 2:37; TEX 23–6)

| Statistics | OU | TEX |
|---|---|---|
| First downs | 16 | 15 |
| Plays–yards | 69–258 | 62–302 |
| Rushes–yards | 30–48 | 35–136 |
| Passing yards | 210 | 166 |
| Passing: Comp–Att–Int | 21–39–3 | 21–27–0 |
| Turnovers | 3 | 0 |
| Time of possession | 29:02 | 30:58 |

| Team | Category | Player | Statistics |
|---|---|---|---|
| Oklahoma | Passing | John Mateer | 20–38, 202 yards, 3 INT |
| Oklahoma | Rushing | Tory Blaylock | 11 carries, 33 yards |
| Oklahoma | Receiving | Deion Burks | 5 receptions, 64 yards |
| Texas | Passing | Arch Manning | 21–27, 166 yards, TD |
| Texas | Rushing | Quintrevion Wisner | 22 carries, 94 yards |
| Texas | Receiving | DeAndre Moore Jr. | 3 receptions, 50 yards, TD |

=== at Kentucky ===
No. 21 Texas Longhorns (4–2) at Kentucky Wildcats (2–3) – Game summary

| Quarter | 1 | 2 | 3 | 4 | OT | Total |
|---|---|---|---|---|---|---|
| No. 21 Longhorns | 0 | 7 | 3 | 3 | 3 | 16 |
| Wildcats | 0 | 0 | 3 | 10 | 0 | 13 |

at Kroger Field • Lexington, Kentucky

- Date: October 18
- Game time: 7:00 p.m.
- Game weather:
- Game attendance: 60,937
- Referee: Steve Marlowe
- TV announcers (ESPN): Dave Flemming (play-by-play), Brock Osweiler (analyst), and Stormy Buonantony (sideline reporter)

Game information

First quarter

- No scoring

Second quarter

- (6:22) TEX – Quintrevion Wisner 1-yard run (Mason Shipley kick), (Drive: 3 plays, 5 yards, 0:46; Texas 7–0)

Third quarter

- (4:09) UK – Jacob Kauwe 46-yard field goal (Drive: 15 plays, 53 yards, 8:44; Texas 7–3)
- (2:05) TEX – Mason Shipley 53-yard field goal (Drive: 6 plays, 40 yards, 2:04; Texas 10–3)

Fourth quarter

- (12:04) UK – Cutter Boley 16-yard run (Jacob Kauwe kick), (Drive: 5 plays, 56 yards, 2:44; Tied 10–10)
- (0:57) TEX – Mason Shipley 39-yard field goal (Drive: 7 plays, 21 yards, 1:39; Texas 13–10)
- (0:09) UK – Jacob Kauwe 45-yard field goal (Drive: 7 plays, 46 yards, 0:42; Tied 13–13)

Overtime

- TEX – Mason Shipley 45-yard field goal (Drive: 4 plays, -2 yards; Texas 16–13)

| Statistics | TEX | UK |
|---|---|---|
| First downs | 8 | 26 |
| Plays–yards | 55–179 | 86–395 |
| Rushes–yards | 28–47 | 46–137 |
| Passing yards | 132 | 258 |
| Passing: comp–att–int | 12–27–0 | 31–40–1 |
| Turnovers | 0 | 1 |
| Time of possession | 20:37 | 39:23 |

| Team | Category | Player | Statistics |
|---|---|---|---|
| Texas | Passing | Arch Manning | 12–27, 132 yards |
| Texas | Rushing | Quintrevion Wisner | 12 carries, 37 yards, TD |
| Texas | Receiving | DeAndre Moore Jr. | 3 receptions, 37 yards |
| Kentucky | Passing | Cutter Boley | 31–39, 258 yards, INT |
| Kentucky | Rushing | Cutter Boley | 14 carries, 45 yards, TD |
| Kentucky | Receiving | Seth McGowan | 7 receptions, 68 yards |

=== at Mississippi State ===
No. 22 Texas Longhorns (5–2) at Mississippi State Bulldogs (4–3) – Game summary

| Quarter | 1 | 2 | 3 | 4 | OT | Total |
|---|---|---|---|---|---|---|
| No. 22 Longhorns | 7 | 7 | 0 | 24 | 7 | 45 |
| Bulldogs | 7 | 17 | 7 | 7 | 0 | 38 |

at Davis Wade Stadium • Starkville, Mississippi

- Date: October 25
- Game time: 3:15 p.m.
- Game weather:
- Game attendance: 52,680
- Referee: Jason Autrey
- TV announcers (SECN): Taylor Zarzour (play-by-play), Matt Stinchcomb (analyst), and Alyssa Lang (sideline reporter)

Game information

First quarter

- (13:01) TEX – Arch Manning 3-yard run (Mason Shipley kick), (Drive: 2 plays, 63 yards, 0:58; Texas 7–0)
- (5:14) MSU – Sam West 13-yard pass from Blake Shapen (Kyle Ferrie kick), (Drive: 6 plays, 53 yards, 2:22; Tied 7–7)

Second quarter

- (12:41) TEX – Parker Livingstone 1-yard pass from Arch Manning (Mason Shipley kick), (Drive: 10 plays, 37 yards, 4:14; Texas 14–7)
- (9:21) MSU – Seydou Traore 1-yard pass from Kamario Taylor (Kyle Ferrie kick), (Drive: 11 plays, 83 yards, 3:16; Tied 14–14)
- (02:30) MSU – Kyle Ferrie 24-yard field goal (Drive: 7 plays, 34 yards, 3:17; Mississippi State 17–14)
- (0:38) MSU – Brenen Thompson 23-yard pass from Blake Shapen (Kyle Ferrie kick), (Drive: 6 plays, 60 yards, 1:05; Mississippi State 24–14)

Third quarter

- (0:26) MSU – Brenen Thompson 4-yard pass from Blake Shapen (Kyle Ferrie kick), (Drive: 8 plays, 80 yards, 3:43; Mississippi State 31–14)

Fourth quarter

- (13:15) TEX – Parker Livingstone 6-yard pass from Arch Manning (Mason Shipley kick), (Drive: 5 plays, 80 yards, 2:05; Mississippi State 31–21)
- (12:29) MSU – Davon Booth 62-yard pass from Blake Shapen (Kyle Ferrie kick), (Drive: 3 plays, 75 yards, 0:46; Mississippi State 38–21)
- (9:34) TEX – Emmett Mosley 21-yard pass from Arch Manning (Mason Shipley kick), (Drive: 9 plays, 75 yards, 2:55; Mississippi State 38–28)
- (4:14) TEX – Mason Shipley 26-yard field goal (Drive: 12 plays, 53 yards, 3:39; Mississippi State 38–31)
- (1:47) TEX – Ryan Niblett 79-yard punt return (Mason Shipley kick), (Drive: 3 plays, 9 yards, 2:21; Tied 38–38)

Overtime

- (1:47) TEX – Emmett Mosley 10-yard pass from Matthew Caldwell (Mason Shipley kick), (Drive: 3 plays, 25 yards; Texas 45–38)

| Statistics | TEX | MSST |
|---|---|---|
| First downs | 22 | 25 |
| Plays–yards | 79–428 | 86–445 |
| Rushes–yards | 32–72 | 43–63 |
| Passing yards | 356 | 382 |
| Passing: comp–att–int | 30–47–1 | 27–43–0 |
| Turnovers | 1 | 1 |
| Time of possession | 30:01 | 29:59 |

| Team | Category | Player | Statistics |
|---|---|---|---|
| Texas | Passing | Arch Manning | 29–46, 346 yards, 3 TD, INT |
| Texas | Rushing | Quintrevion Wisner | 12 carries, 41 yards |
| Texas | Receiving | Ryan Wingo | 5 receptions, 184 yards |
| Mississippi State | Passing | Blake Shapen | 26–42, 381 yards, 4 TD |
| Mississippi State | Rushing | Davon Booth | 24 carries, 99 yards |
| Mississippi State | Receiving | Davon Booth | 3 receptions, 85 yards, TD |

=== vs No. 9 Vanderbilt ===
No. 9 Vanderbilt Commodores (7–1) at No. 20 Texas Longhorns (6–2) – Game summary

| Quarter | 1 | 2 | 3 | 4 | Total |
|---|---|---|---|---|---|
| No. 9 Commodores | 0 | 10 | 0 | 21 | 31 |
| No. 20 Longhorns | 17 | 7 | 10 | 0 | 34 |

at Darrell K Royal–Texas Memorial Stadium • Austin, Texas

- Date: November 1
- Game time: 11:00 a.m.
- Game weather:
- Game attendance: 102,338
- Referee: Lee Hedrick
- TV announcers (ABC): Sean McDonough (play-by-play), Greg McElroy (analyst), and Molly McGrath (sideline reporter)

Game information

First quarter

- (14:49) TEX – Ryan Wingo 75-yard pass from Arch Manning (Mason Shipley kick), (Drive: 1 plays, 75 yards, 0:11; Texas 7–0)
- (11:38) TEX – Mason Shipley 39-yard field goal (Drive: 5 plays, 8 yards, 1:08; Texas 10–0)
- (2:11) TEX – CJ Baxter 6–yard pass from Arch Manning (Mason Shipley kick), (Drive: 10 plays, 83 yards, 5:01; Texas 17–0)

Second quarter

- (11:22) VAN – Brock Taylor 44-yard field goal (Drive: 9 plays, 53 yards, 5:44; Texas 17–3)
- (7:02) TEX – Quintrevion Wisner 4-yard run (Mason Shipley kick), (Drive: 8 plays, 68 yards, 4:15; Texas 24–3)
- (0:11) VAN – Eli Stowers 18–yard pass from Diego Pavia (Brock Taylor kick), (Drive: 13 plays, 75 yards, 6:51; Texas 24–10)

Third quarter

- (9:12) TEX – Emmett Mosley V 6–yard pass from Arch Manning (Mason Shipley kick), (Drive: 11 plays, 93 yards, 5:15; Texas 31–10)
- (0:06) TEX – Mason Shipley 37-yard field goal (Drive: 11 plays, 51 yards, 5:31; Texas 34–10)

Fourth quarter

- (10:05) VAN – Diego Pavia 25-yard run (Two-point conversion failed), (Drive: 8 plays, 68 yards, 4:15; Texas 34–16)
- (3:54) VAN – Eli Stowers 67–yard pass from Diego Pavia (Diego Pavia pass to Junior Sherrill for two-point conversion), (Drive: 1 plays, 67 yards, 0:10; Texas 34–24)
- (0:33) VAN – Richie Hoskins 8–yard pass from Diego Pavia (Brock Taylor kick), (Drive: 12 plays, 89 yards, 2:31; Texas 34–31)

| Statistics | VAN | TEX |
|---|---|---|
| First downs | 25 | 23 |
| Plays–yards | 62–423 | 60–428 |
| Rushes–yards | 24–58 | 27–100 |
| Passing yards | 365 | 328 |
| Passing: comp–att–int | 27–38–0 | 25–33–0 |
| Turnovers | 0 | 0 |
| Time of possession | 30:59 | 29:01 |

| Team | Category | Player | Statistics |
|---|---|---|---|
| Vanderbilt | Passing | Diego Pavia | 27–38, 365 yards, 3 TD |
| Vanderbilt | Rushing | Diego Pavia | 14 carries, 43 yards, TD |
| Vanderbilt | Receiving | Eli Stowers | 7 receptions, 146 yards, 2 TD |
| Texas | Passing | Arch Manning | 25–33, 328 yards, 3 TD |
| Texas | Rushing | Quintrevion Wisner | 18 carries, 75 yards, TD |
| Texas | Receiving | Ryan Wingo | 2 receptions, 89 yards, TD |

=== at No. 5 Georgia ===
No. 10 Texas Longhorns (7–2) at No. 5 Georgia Bulldogs (8–1) – Game summary

| Quarter | 1 | 2 | 3 | 4 | Total |
|---|---|---|---|---|---|
| No. 10 Longhorns | 3 | 0 | 7 | 0 | 10 |
| No. 5 Bulldogs | 7 | 7 | 0 | 21 | 35 |

at Sanford Stadium • Athens, Georgia

- Date: November 15
- Game time: 7:30 p.m.
- Game weather: Clear • Temperature: 62 °F (17 °C)
- Game attendance: 93,033
- Referee: Kyle Olson
- TV announcers (ABC): Chris Fowler (play-by-play), Kirk Herbstreit (analyst), Holly Rowe and Laura Rutledge (sideline reporters)

Game information

First quarter

- (8:53) TEX – Mason Shipley 33-yard field goal (Drive: 13 plays, 59 yards, 6:07; Texas 3–0)
- (4:12) UGA – Noah Thomas 17-yard pass from Gunner Stockton (Peyton Woodring kick) (Drive: 9 plays, 75 yards, 4:41; Georgia 7–3)

Second quarter

- (15:00) UGA – Noah Thomas 4-yard pass from Gunner Stockton (Peyton Woodring kick) (Drive: 8 plays, 66 yards, 4:32; Georgia 14–3)

Third quarter

- (5:27) TEX – Ryan Wingo 7-yard pass from Arch Manning (Mason Shipley kick) (Drive: 6 plays, 36 yards, 2:44; Georgia 14–10)

Fourth quarter

- (14:20) UGA – London Humphreys 30-yard pass from Gunner Stockton (Peyton Woodring kick) (Drive: 10 plays, 73 yards, 6:01; Georgia 21–10)
- (8:53) UGA – Lawson Luckie 6-yard pass from Gunner Stockton (Peyton Woodring kick) (Drive: 9 plays, 53 yards, 5:27; Georgia 28–10)
- (4:43) UGA – Gunner Stockton 4-yard run (Peyton Woodring kick) (Drive: 5 plays, 33 yards, 3:06; Georgia 35–10)

| Statistics | TEX | UGA |
|---|---|---|
| First downs | 15 | 21 |
| Plays–yards | 60–274 | 64–357 |
| Rushes–yards | 17–23 | 35–128 |
| Passing yards | 251 | 229 |
| Passing: comp–att–int | 27–43–1 | 24–29–1 |
| Turnovers | 1 | 1 |
| Time of possession | 24:51 | 35:09 |

| Team | Category | Player | Statistics |
|---|---|---|---|
| Texas | Passing | Arch Manning | 27/43, 251 yards, TD, INT |
| Texas | Rushing | Quintrevion Wisner | 9 carries, 37 yards |
| Texas | Receiving | DeAndre Moore Jr. | 5 receptions, 75 yards |
| Georgia | Passing | Gunner Stockton | 24/29, 229 yards, 4 TD, INT |
| Georgia | Rushing | Nate Frazier | 16 carries, 72 yards |
| Georgia | Receiving | London Humphreys | 2 receptions, 55 yards, TD |

=== vs Arkansas (rivalry) ===
Arkansas Razorbacks (2–8) at No. 17 Texas Longhorns (7–3) – Game summary

| Quarter | 1 | 2 | 3 | 4 | Total |
|---|---|---|---|---|---|
| Razorbacks | 6 | 14 | 3 | 14 | 37 |
| No. 17 Longhorns | 14 | 10 | 21 | 7 | 52 |

at Darrell K Royal–Texas Memorial Stadium • Austin, Texas

- Date: November 22
- Game time: 2:30 p.m. CST
- Game weather:
- Game attendance: 102,361
- Referee: Kyle Olson
- TV announcers (ABC): Joe Tessitore (play-by-play), Jesse Palmer (analyst) and Katie George (sideline)

Game information

First quarter

- (13:11) ARK – Scott Starzyk 51-yard field goal (Drive: 5 plays, 42 yards, 1:49; Arkansas 3–0)
- (11:29) TEX – DeAndre Moore Jr. 46-yard pass from Arch Manning (Mason Shipley kick) (Drive: 4 plays, 81 yards, 1:35; Texas 7–3)
- (7:34) ARK – Scott Starzyk 33-yard field goal (Drive: 7 plays, 60 yards, 3:55; Texas 7–6)
- (2:32) TEX – Parker Livingstone 4-yard pass from Arch Manning (Mason Shipley kick) (Drive: 10 plays, 75 yards, 5:02; Texas 14–6)

Second quarter

- (14:09) ARK – Mike Washington Jr. 22-yard run (Scott Starzyk kick) (Drive: 7 plays, 75 yards, 3:23; Texas 14–13)
- (12:26) TEX – Parker Livingstone 54-yard pass from Arch Manning (Mason Shipley kick) (Drive: 5 plays, 75 yards, 1:43; Texas 21–13)
- (7:24) ARK – Taylen Green 4-yard run (Scott Starzyk kick) (Drive: 11 plays, 75 yards, 5:02; Texas 21–20)
- (0:00) TEX – Mason Shipley 44-yard field goal (Drive: 4 plays, 9 yards, 0:50; Texas 24–20)

Third quarter

- (12:32) TEX – Arch Manning 3-yard run (Mason Shipley kick) (Drive: 5 plays, 75 yards, 2:28; Texas 31–20)
- (7:05) TEX – DeAndre Moore Jr. 8-yard pass from Arch Manning (Mason Shipley kick) (Drive: 7 plays, 38 yards, 2:36; Texas 38–20)
- (2:18) ARK – Scott Starzyk 33-yard field goal (Drive: 13 plays, 60 yards, 4:47; Texas 38–23)
- (0:50) TEX – DeAndre Moore Jr. 20-yard pass from Arch Manning (Mason Shipley kick) (Drive: 5 plays, 75 yards, 1:28; Texas 45–23)

Fourth quarter

- (11:30) TEX – Liona Lefau 52-yard fumble return (Mason Shipley kick) (Drive: 10 plays, 44 yards, 1:28; Texas 52–23)
- (7:46) ARK – KJ Jackson 12-yard run (Scott Starzyk kick) (Drive: 10 plays, 75 yards, 3:44; Texas 52–30)
- (0:16) ARK – Jaden Platt 8-yard pass from KJ Jackson (Scott Starzyk kick) (Drive: 9 plays, 92 yards, 1:50; Texas 52–37)

| Statistics | ARK | TEX |
|---|---|---|
| First downs | 29 | 22 |
| Plays–yards | 80–512 | 59–490 |
| Rushes–yards | 31–188 | 28–97 |
| Passing yards | 324 | 393 |
| Passing: comp–att–int | 26–49–1 | 19–31–0 |
| Turnovers | 2 | 0 |
| Time of possession | 34:17 | 24:53 |

| Team | Category | Player | Statistics |
|---|---|---|---|
| Arkansas | Passing | KJ Jackson | 16–29, 206 yards, TD |
| Arkansas | Rushing | Mike Washington Jr. | 17 carries, 105 yards, TD |
| Arkansas | Receiving | Rohan Jones | 5 receptions, 72 yards |
| Texas | Passing | Arch Manning | 18–30, 389 yards, 4 TD |
| Texas | Rushing | Quintrevion Wisner | 15 carries, 67 yards |
| Texas | Receiving | Parker Livingstone | 2 receptions, 104 yards, TD |

=== vs No. 3 Texas A&M ===
No. 3 Texas A&M Aggies (11–0) at No. 16 Texas Longhorns (8–3) – Game summary

| Quarter | 1 | 2 | 3 | 4 | Total |
|---|---|---|---|---|---|
| No. 3 Aggies | 0 | 10 | 0 | 7 | 17 |
| No. 16 Longhorns | 0 | 3 | 10 | 14 | 27 |

at Darrell K Royal–Texas Memorial Stadium • Austin, Texas

- Date: November 28
- Game time: 6:30 p.m.
- Game weather: Sunny • Temperature: 64 °F (18 °C)
- Game attendance: 103,632
- Referee: Steve Marlowe
- TV announcers (ABC): Sean McDonough (play-by-play), Greg McElroy (color commentator), and Molly McGrath (sideline reporter)

Game information

First quarter

- No scoring plays.

Second quarter

- (12:04) TEX – Mason Shipley 41-yard field goal (Drive: 14 plays, 57 yards, 4:42; Texas 3–0)
- (6:41) A&M – Jared Zirkel 31-yard field goal (Drive: 9 plays, 62 yards, 5:18; Texas 3–3)
- (0:56) A&M – K.C. Concepcion 8-yard run (Jared Zirkel kick) (Drive: 9 plays, 42 yards, 4:15; Texas A&M 10–3)

Third quarter

- (11:56) TEX – Mason Shipley 46-yard field goal (Drive: 5 plays, 50 yards, 1:54; Texas A&M 10–6)
- (7:12) TEX – Ryan Wingo 29-yard pass from Arch Manning (Mason Shipley kick) (Drive: 6 plays, 70 yards, 3:04; Texas 13–10)

Fourth quarter

- (14:57) TEX – Nick Townsend 2-yard run (Mason Shipley kick) (Drive: 6 plays, 83 yards, 3:14; Texas 20–10)
- (9:15) A&M – E.J. Smith 13-yard run (Jared Zirkel kick) (Drive: 6 plays, 59 yards, 1:37; Texas 20–17)
- (7:04) TEX – Arch Manning 35-yard run (Mason Shipley kick) (Drive: 4 plays, 63 yards, 2:03; Texas 27–17)

| Statistics | TA&M | TEX |
|---|---|---|
| First downs | 19 | 19 |
| Plays–yards | 70–337 | 74–397 |
| Rushes–yards | 34–157 | 35–218 |
| Passing yards | 180 | 179 |
| Passing: comp–att–int | 20–32–2 | 14–31–0 |
| Turnovers | 2 | 0 |
| Total yards | 337 | 397 |
| Time of possession | 32:15 | 27:45 |

| Team | Category | Player | Statistics |
|---|---|---|---|
| Texas A&M | Passing | Marcel Reed | 20–32, 180 yards, 2 INT |
| Texas A&M | Rushing | Marcel Reed | 12 carries, 71 yards |
| Texas A&M | Receiving | KC Concepcion | 5 receptions, 57 yards |
| Texas | Passing | Arch Manning | 14–31, 179 yards, TD |
| Texas | Rushing | Quintrevion Wisner | 19 carries, 155 yards |
| Texas | Receiving | Jack Endries | 4 receptions, 93 yards |

=== vs. No. 18 Michigan—Citrus Bowl ===
2025 Cheez-It Citrus Bowl
No. 18 Michigan Wolverines (9–3) vs. No. 13 Texas Longhorns (9–3) – Game summary

| Quarter | 1 | 2 | 3 | 4 | Total |
|---|---|---|---|---|---|
| No. 18 Wolverines | 10 | 7 | 3 | 7 | 27 |
| No. 13 Longhorns | 3 | 14 | 7 | 17 | 41 |

at Camping World Stadium • Orlando, FL

- Date: December 31
- Game time: 2:00 p.m. CDT
- Game weather: Sunny • Temperature: 68 °F (20 °C)
- Game attendance: 47,316
- Referee: Mike Roche (ACC)
- TV announcers (ABC): Mark Jones (play-by-play), Roddy Jones (analyst), and Alyssa Lang (sideline)

Game information

First quarter

- (12:05) TEX – Mason Shipley 43-yard field goal (Drive: 9 plays, 50 yards, 2:55; Texas 3–0)
- (4:01) MICH – Dominic Zvada 53-yard field goal (Drive: 9 plays, 40 yards, 3:49; Tied 3–3)
- (3:18) MICH – Kendrick Bell 19-yard pass from Bryce Underwood (Dominic Zvada kick) (Drive: 3 plays, 23 yards, 0:41; Michigan 10–3)

Second quarter

- (13:43) TEX – Christian Clark 3-yard run (Mason Shipley kick) (Drive: 11 plays, 75 yards, 4:32; Tied 10–10)
- (10:17) MICH – Andrew Marsh 4-yard pass from Bryce Underwood (Dominic Zvada kick) (Drive: 7 plays, 69 yards, 3:19; Michigan 17–10)
- (7:41) TEX – Jack Endries 17-yard pass from Arch Manning (Mason Shipley kick) (Drive: 8 plays, 74 yards, 2:31; Tied 17–17)

Third quarter

- (9:37) MICH – Dominic Zvada 31-yard field goal (Drive: 12 plays, 41 yards, 5:13; Michigan 20–17)
- (5:38) TEX – Arch Manning 23-yard run (Mason Shipley kick) (Drive: 9 plays, 80 yards, 3:55; Texas 24–20)

Fourth quarter

- (10:56) MICH – Bryce Underwood 5-yard run (Dominic Zvada kick) (Drive: 11 plays, 45 yards, 5:20; Michigan 27–24)
- (6:54) TEX – Kaliq Lockett 30-yard pass from Arch Manning (Mason Shipley kick) (Drive: 9 plays, 75 yards, 4:02; Texas 31–27)
- (5:06) TEX – Arch Manning 60-yard run (Mason Shipley kick) (Drive: 1 play, 60 yards, 0:09; Texas 38–27)
- (3:38) TEX – Mason Shipley 51-yard field goal (Drive: 4 plays, 1 yard, 0:55; Texas 41–27)

| Statistics | MICH | TEX |
|---|---|---|
| First downs | 19 | 24 |
| Plays–yards | 81–373 | 67–456 |
| Rushes–yards | 38–174 | 38–235 |
| Passing yards | 199 | 221 |
| Passing: comp–att–int | 22–43–3 | 21–34–0 |
| Turnovers | 3 | 1 |
| Total yards | 373 | 456 |
| Time of possession | 33:08 | 26:52 |

| Team | Category | Player | Statistics |
|---|---|---|---|
| Michigan | Passing | Bryce Underwood | 23–42, 199 yards, 2 TD, 3 INT |
| Michigan | Rushing | Bryson Kuzdzal | 20 carries, 82 yards |
| Michigan | Receiving | Donaven McCulley | 4 receptions, 54 yards |
| Texas | Passing | Arch Manning | 21–34, 221 yards, 2 TD |
| Texas | Rushing | Arch Manning | 9 carries, 155 yards, 2 TD |
| Texas | Receiving | Ryan Wingo | 4 receptions, 64 yards |

== Personnel ==
=== Roster ===
2025 Texas Longhorns football team roster
Players
Coaches
Offense

| Pos. | # | Name | Class |
|---|---|---|---|
| WR | 0 | DeAndre Moore Jr. | Jr |
| WR | 1 | Ryan Wingo | So |
| WR | 2 | Jaime Ffrench | Fr |
| WR | 3 | Emmett Mosley V | So |
| RB | 4 | CJ Baxter | So |
| RB | 5 | Quintrevion Wisner | Jr |
| RB | 6 | Christian Clark | Fr |
| WR | 7 | Kaliq Lockett | Fr |
| QB | 8 | KJ Lacey Jr. | Fr |
| WR/RB | 11 | Michael Terry III | Fr |
| WR | 13 | Parker Livingstone | Fr |
| WR | 14 | Aaron Butler | Fr |
| QB | 15 | Trey Owens | Fr |
| QB | 16 | Arch Manning | So |
| WR | 17 | Daylan McCutcheon | Fr |
| QB | 18 | Matthew Caldwell | Sr |
| QB | 18 | Joe Tatum | Sr |
| WR | 21 | Ryan Niblett | So |
| RB | 24 | Rickey Stewart Jr. | Fr |
| QB | 25 | Luke Dunham | Fr |
| RB | 27 | Colin Page | Sr |
| RB | 31 | James Simon | Fr |
| RB | 33 | Carson Berger | So |
| WR | 35 | Rett Andersen | Jr |
| WR | 36 | Quinn Merritt | Sr |
| WR | 38 | Remy Patson | Sr |
| WR | 39 | Hamilton McMartin | Sr |
| WR | 48 | Bryce Chambers | Jr |
| OL | 51 | Daniel Cruz | Fr |
| OL | 52 | DJ Campbell | Sr |
| OL | 54 | Cole Hutson | Sr |
| OL | 59 | Devin Coleman | Fr |
| OL | 62 | Rick McBroom | Sr |
| OL | 62 | Connor Robertson | Jr |
| OL | 64 | Robert Sweeney | Sr |
| OL | 68 | Brooks Kieschnick Jr. | Jr |
| OL | 70 | Nate Kibble | Fr |
| OL | 71 | Nick Brooks | Fr |
| OL | 72 | Neto Umeozulu | Jr |
| OL | 73 | Brandon Baker | So |
| OL | 74 | Trevor Goosby | So |
| OL | 75 | Jaydon Chatman | So |
| OL | 76 | Jackson Christian | Fr |
| OL | 77 | Andre Cojoe | So |
| OL | 78 | Jordan Coleman | Fr |
| OL | 79 | Connor Stroh | So |
| TE | 81 | Nick Townsend | Fr |
| TE | 82 | Ridge Barker | Fr |
| TE | 83 | Spencer Shannon | So |
| TE | 84 | Jordan Washington | Fr |
| TE | 85 | Emaree Winston | Fr |
| WR | 86 | Hudson Powell | So |
| TE | 87 | Will Randle | So |
| TE | 88 | Jack Endries | Jr |
| WR | 89 | Ty Boatright | Jr |

Defense

| Pos. | # | Name | Class |
|---|---|---|---|
| LB | 0 | Anthony Hill Jr. | Jr |
| DE | 1 | Colin Simmons | So |
| DB | 2 | Derek Williams Jr. | So |
| DB | 3 | Jaylon Guilbeau | Sr |
| DB | 4 | Jelani McDonald | Jr |
| DB | 5 | Malik Muhammad | Jr |
| DB | 6 | Kobe Black | So |
| DE | 8 | Trey Moore | Sr |
| DB | 9 | Jonah Williams | Fr |
| DB | 11 | Kade Phillips | Fr |
| DB | 13 | Zelus Hicks | Fr |
| LB | 14 | Brad Spence | Jr |
| DL | 15 | Justus Terry | Fr |
| DB | 16 | Michael Taaffe | Sr |
| DB | 17 | Xavier Filsaime | So |
| LB | 18 | Liona Lefau | Jr |
| DE | 19 | Zina Umeozulu | Fr |
| DB | 23 | Jordan Johnson-Rubell | So |
| DB | 24 | Warren Roberson | So |
| DB | 25 | Caleb Chester | Fr |
| LB | 26 | Ty'Anthony Smith | So |
| DB | 27 | Wardell Mack | Fr |
| DB | 28 | Santana Wilson | Fr |
| DB | 29 | Graceson Littleton | Fr |
| LB | 30 | Elijah Barnes | Fr |
| DB | 30 | Carson Marshall | Sr |
| LB | 32 | Brady Sarkisian | Jr |
| DL | 33 | Myron Charles | Fr |
| DB | 35 | McCoy Bruce | Fr |
| LB | 37 | Jonathan Cunningham | Fr |
| DB | 38 | Graham Gillespie | Sr |
| DL | 40 | Lance Jackson | Fr |
| DB | 41 | Ziky Umeozulu | Fr |
| DB | 43 | Eric Garza | Fr |
| DL | 44 | Travis Shaw | Sr |
| DE | 46 | Smith Orogbo | Fr |
| DB | 48 | Jackson Duffey | Fr |
| LB | 50 | Michael Flanagan | Sr |
| LB | 51 | Marshall Landwehr | Sr |
| DL | 55 | Melvin Hills III | Fr |
| DL | 90 | Josiah Sharma | Fr |
| DE | 91 | Ethan Burke | Sr |
| DE | 92 | Colton Vasek | So |
| DL | 93 | Hero Kanu | Sr |
| DL | 96 | Lavon Johnson | Jr |
| DL | 97 | Alex January | So |
| DL | 98 | Maraad Watson | So |
| DL | 99 | Cole Brevard | Sr |

Special teams

| Pos. | # | Name | Class |
|---|---|---|---|
| P | 19 | Jack Bouwmeester | Sr |
| LS | 42 | Tate Haver | Jr |
| K | 46 | Spencer Barnett | Fr |
| P | 47 | Gehrig Heil | Fr |
| K | 49 | Mason Shipley | Sr |
| LS | 58 | Lance St. Louis | Sr |

Head coach

- Steve Sarkisian

Coordinators/assistant coaches

- Jeff Banks – Associate head coach/special teams coordinator/tight ends
- Kyle Flood – Offensive coordinator/offensive linemen
- Pete Kwiatkowski – Defensive coordinator/outside linebackers
- A. J. Milwee – Co-offensive coordinator/quarterbacks
- Johnny Nansen – Co-defensive coordinator/inside linebackers
- Chad Scott – Running backs
- Chris Jackson – Passing Game Coordinator/Wide receivers
- Kenny Baker – Defensive linemen
- LaAllan Clark – EDGE
- Duane Akina – Defensive passing game coordinator/Defensive backs
- Mark Orphey – Cornerbacks
- Michael Bimonte – Co-Passing Game Coordinator/Assistant QB
- Keynodo Hudson – Nickels
- Patrick Crowley – Offensive analyst
- John Dozier Dean – Offensive analyst
- Malik Antoine – Analyst
- Christopher Forestier – Analyst
- Justin Garrett – Analyst
- Derron Gatewood – Analyst
- Brandon Huppert – Analyst
- Michael Jenkins – Analyst
- Jason McEndoo – Analyst
- Matt Moran – Analyst
- Mitch Zoloty – Analyst

Legend

- (C) Team captain
- (S) Suspended
- (I) Ineligible
- Injured
- Redshirt

Roster
Last update: 9/1/25

=== Depth chart ===
Defense

NB
Graceson Littleton
Wardell Mack
Graham Gillespie

FS
Michael Taaffe
Derek Williams Jr.
Jonah Williams

| WLB | MLB |
|---|---|
| Anthony Hill Jr. | Liona Lefau |
| Elijah Barnes | Ty'Anthony Smith |
| Jonathan Cunningham | Marshall Landwehr |

SS
Jelani McDonald
Xavier Filsaime
Jordon Johnson-Rubell

CB
Jaylon Guilbeau
Kade Phillips
Santana Wilson

| DE | DT | DT | DE |
|---|---|---|---|
| Ethan Burke | Hero Kanu | Alex January | Colin Simmons |
| Lance Jackson | Cole Brevard | Maraad Watson | Trey Moore |
| Zina Umeozulu | Travis Shaw | Lavon Johnson | Brad Spence |

CB
Malik Muhammad
Warren Roberson
Kobe Black

Offense

WR (H)
DeAndre Moore Jr.
Ryan Niblett
Rett Anderson

WR (X)
Ryan Wingo
Daylan McCutcheon
Kaliq Lockett

| LT | LG | C | RG | RT |
|---|---|---|---|---|
| Trevor Goosby | Cole Hutson | Connor Robertson | DJ Campbell | Brandon Baker |
| Jordan Coleman | Nick Brooks | Daniel Cruz | Connor Stroh | Jaydon Chatman |
| ⋅ | Neto Umeozulu | ⋅ | Nate Kibble | ⋅ |

TE
Jack Endries
Jordan Washington
Spencer Shannon

WR (Z)
Emmett Mosley
Parker Livingstone
Aaron Butler

QB
Arch Manning
Matthew Caldwell
KJ Lacey Jr.

RB
Quintrevion Wisner
CJ Baxter
Christian Clark

Special teams
PK Mason Shipley
PK Will Stone
P Jack Bouwmeester
P Gehrig Heil
KR Ryan Niblett
PR Ryan Niblett
LS Lance St. Louis
H Jack Bouwmeester

=== Departures ===
==== Team departures ====
2025 Texas Offseason departures
| Name | Number | Pos. | Height | Weight | Year | Hometown | Notes |
|---|---|---|---|---|---|---|---|
| Alfred Collins | 95 | DL | 6'5" | 320 | Senior | Bastrop, TX | Drafted by San Francisco 49ers |
| Andrew Mukuba | 4 | DB | 6'0" | 190 | Senior | Austin, TX | Drafted by Philadelphia Eagles |
| Barryn Sorrell | 88 | EDGE | 6'4" | 260 | Senior | New Orleans, LA | Drafted by Green Bay Packers |
| Bill Norton | 15 | DL | 6'6" | 335 | Senior | Memphis, TN | Signed with Los Angeles Rams |
| Cameron Williams | 56 | OL | 6'5" | 335 | Junior | Duncanville, TX | Drafted by Philadelphia Eagles |
| Christian Rizzi | 57 | DS | 5'11" | 215 lbs | Senior | Metairie, LA | Assistant at Appalachian State |
| Cole Lourd | 19 | QB | 6'2" | 215 lbs | Senior | Los Angeles, CA | Player Personnel Assistant at Texas |
| David Gbenda | 33 | LB | 6'0" | 235 | Senior | Katy, TX | Signed with Tennessee Titans |
| Dorian Black | 86 | DL | 5'10" | 280 lbs | Senior | Harker Heights, TX | Graduated |
| Gavin Holmes | 9 | DB | 5'11" | 185 | Senior | New Orleans, LA | Signed with Detroit Lions |
| Gunnar Helm | 85 | TE | 6'5" | 250 | Senior | Englewood, CO | Drafted by Tennessee Titans |
| Hayden Conner | 76 | OL | 6'5" | 320 | Senior | Katy, TX | Drafted by Arizona Cardinals |
| Isaiah Bond | 7 | WR | 5'11" | 180 | Junior | Buford, GA | Signed with Cleveland Browns |
| Jahdae Barron | 7 | DB | 5'11" | 200 | Senior | Austin, TX | Drafted by Denver Broncos |
| Jake Majors | 65 | C | 6'3" | 315 | Senior | Prosper, TX | Signed with Tampa Bay Buccaneers |
| Jaydon Blue | 23 | RB | 6'0" | 200 | Junior | Houston, TX | Drafted by Dallas Cowboys |
| Jermayne Lole | 99 | DL | 6'3" | 315 | Senior | Long Beach, CA | Graduated |
| Juan Davis | 81 | TE | 6'4" | 235 | Senior | Fort Worth, TX | Graduated |
| Kelvin Banks Jr. | 78 | OL | 6'4" | 320 | Junior | Humble, TX | Drafted by New Orleans Saints |
| Matthew Golden | 2 | WR | 6'0" | 195 lbs | Junior | Houston, TX | Drafted by Green Bay Packers |
| Max Merril | 69 | OL | 6'4" | 295 lbs | Junior | Houston, TX | Graduated |
| Morice Blackwell Jr. | 37 | LB | 6'1" | 220 | Senior | Arlington, TX | Signed with Calgary Stampeders (CFL) |
| Quinn Ewers | 3 | QB | 6'2" | 210 | Junior | Southlake, TX | Drafted by Miami Dolphins |
| Silas Bolden | 11 | WR | 5'8" | 160 | Senior | Rancho Cucamonga, CA | Signed with Minnesota Vikings |
| Thatcher Milton | 49 | WR | 5'10" | 185 lbs | Senior | Cypress, TX | Project Manager at Arco Murray |
| Velton Gardner | 24 | RB | 5'9" | 190 lbs | Senior | Dallas, TX | Graduated |
| Vernon Broughton | 45 | DL | 6'4" | 305 | Senior | Houston, TX | Drafted by New Orleans Saints |

==== Outgoing transfers ====
| Name | No. | Pos. | Height | Weight | Hometown | Year | New school | Source |
|---|---|---|---|---|---|---|---|---|
| Aaron Bryant | 53 | DL | 6'3" | 290 | Southaven, MS | Redshirt Sophomore | Vanderbilt | |
| Amari Niblack | 8 | TE | 6'4" | 245 | St. Petersburg, FL | Junior | Texas A&M | |
| Bert Auburn | 45 | K | 6'0" | 184 | Flower Mound, TX | Senior | Miami | |
| Charlie Feris | 47 | K | 6'2" | 190 | Houston, TX | Senior | SFA (baseball) | |
| Derion Gullette | 40 | LB | 6'3" | 225 | Marlin, TX | Sophomore | Mississippi State | |
| Freddie Dubose Jr | 80 | WR | 6'1" | 185 | New Braunfels, TX | Freshman | Snow College | |
| Ian Ratliff | 49 | P | 5'11" | 185 | Humble, TX | Sophomore | Appalachian State | |
| Jaray Bledsoe | 94 | DL | 6'4" | 290 | Bremond, TX | Sophomore | Mississippi State | |
| Jay'Vion Cole | 13 | DB | 5'11" | 170 | Oakland, CA | Junior | Arizona | |
| Johntay Cook II | 1 | WR | 6'0" | 186 | DeSoto, TX | Sophomore | Syracuse | |
| Justice Finkley | 1 | EDGE | 6'2" | 250 | Trussville, AL | Junior | Kansas | |
| Malik Agbo | 67 | OL | 6'4" | 280 | Federal Way, WA | Redshirt Sophomore | West Virginia | |
| Michael Kern | 39 | P | 6'3" | 195 | Fort Lauderdale, FL | Freshman | California | |
| Reece Beauchamp | 84 | WR | 6'2" | 190 | Austin, TX | Junior | Marist | |
| Reid Watkins | 29 | RB | 5'11" | 195 | Fort Worth, TX | Freshman | South Dakota | |
| Sydir Mitchell | 90 | DL | 6'6" | 350 | Paterson, NJ | Redshirt Freshman | LSU | |
| Tausili Akana | 46 | EDGE | 6'4" | 215 | Kahuku, HI | Redshirt Freshman | BYU | |
| Tiaoalii Savea | 98 | DL | 6'3" | 265 | Las Vegas, NV | Senior | Arizona | |

Note: Players with a dash in the new school column didn't land on a new team for the 2025 season.

==== Coaching staff departures ====
| Name | Position | New Team | New Position | Source |
|---|---|---|---|---|
| Blake Gideon | Safeties | Georgia Tech | Defensive coordinator | |
| Dalton Williams | Analyst | Southern Miss | Tight Ends | |
| Davis Koetter | Analyst | South Carolina | Assistant Quarterbacks Coach | |
| Scottie Hazelton | Special assistant to the head coach | Wake Forest | Defensive coordinator | |
| Tashard Choice | Running backs | Detroit Lions | Running backs | |
| Terry Joseph | Defensive backs | New Orleans Saints | Defensive pass game coordinator | |

=== Acquisitions ===
==== Incoming transfers ====
| Name | Pos. | Height | Weight | Hometown | Year | Prev school | Source |
|---|---|---|---|---|---|---|---|
| Brad Spence | LB | 6'2" | 238 | Houston, TX | Sophomore | Arkansas | |
| CJ Rogers | QB | 6'3" | 200 | Argyle, TX | Junior | Houston Christian | |
| Cole Brevard | DL | 6'3" | 333 | Carmel, IN | Senior | Purdue | |
| Emmett Mosley V | WR | 6'2" | 205 | Chicago, IL | Freshman | Stanford | |
| Hero Kanu | DL | 6'5" | 305 | Geltendorf, GER | Junior | Ohio State | |
| Jack Bouwmeester | P | 6'3" | 197 | Bendigo, AUS | Junior | Utah | |
| Jack Endries | TE | 6'4" | 240 | Danville, CA | Sophomore | California | |
| Lavon Johnson | DL | 6'2" | 311 | Allentown, PA | Junior | Maryland | |
| Maraad Watson | DL | 6'3" | 313 | Irvington, NJ | Freshman | Syracuse | |
| Mason Shipley | K | 6'0" | 185 | Liberty Hill, TX | Junior | Texas State | |
| Matthew Caldwell | QB | 6'4" | 212 | Auburn, AL | Junior | Troy | |
| Travis Shaw | DL | 6'5.5" | 330 | Greensboro, NC | Junior | North Carolina | |

==== 2025 recruits ====
College recruiting
| Name | Hometown | School | Height | Weight | Commit date |
|---|---|---|---|---|---|
| Jonah Williams; S | Galveston, TX | Ball High School | 6 ft 3 in (1.91 m) | 203 lb (92 kg) | Aug 24, 2024 |
| Jonah Williams; S | Recruit ratings: Rivals: 247Sports: ESPN: (91) | | | | |
| Justus Terry; DL | Manchester, GA | Manchester High School | 6 ft 5 in (1.96 m) | 275 lb (125 kg) | Dec 6, 2024 |
| Justus Terry; DL | Recruit ratings: Rivals: 247Sports: ESPN: (91) | | | | |
| Lance Jackson; DL | Texarkana, TX | Pleasant Grove High School | 6 ft 5 in (1.96 m) | 245 lb (111 kg) | Jan 21, 2024 |
| Lance Jackson; DL | Recruit ratings: Rivals: 247Sports: ESPN: (84) | | | | |
| Kaliq Lockett; WR | Sachse, TX | Sachse High School | 6 ft 2 in (1.88 m) | 175 lb (79 kg) | Aug 7, 2024 |
| Kaliq Lockett; WR | Recruit ratings: Rivals: 247Sports: ESPN: (86) | | | | |
| Kade Phillips; S | Missouri City, TX | Hightower High School | 6 ft 0.5 in (1.84 m) | 175 lb (79 kg) | Dec 3, 2024 |
| Kade Phillips; S | Recruit ratings: Rivals: 247Sports: ESPN: (86) | | | | |
| Jaime Ffrench; WR | Jacksonville, FL | Mandarin High School | 6 ft 1 in (1.85 m) | 185 lb (84 kg) | Aug 30, 2024 |
| Jaime Ffrench; WR | Recruit ratings: Rivals: 247Sports: ESPN: (87) | | | | |
| Elijah Barnes; LB | Dallas, TX | Skyline High School | 6 ft 1.5 in (1.87 m) | 220 lb (100 kg) | Apr 12, 2024 |
| Elijah Barnes; LB | Recruit ratings: Rivals: 247Sports: ESPN: (83) | | | | |
| Graceson Littleton; DB | Wesley Chapel, FL | Wiregrass Ranch High School | 6 ft 0 in (1.83 m) | 180 lb (82 kg) | Nov 14, 2024 |
| Graceson Littleton; DB | Recruit ratings: Rivals: 247Sports: ESPN: (83) | | | | |
| Michael Terry III; ATH | San Antonio, TX | Alamo Heights High School | 6 ft 3 in (1.91 m) | 217 lb (98 kg) | Dec 4, 2024 |
| Michael Terry III; ATH | Recruit ratings: Rivals: 247Sports: ESPN: (86) | | | | |
| Nick Townsend; ATH | Houston, TX | Dekaney High School | 6 ft 3 in (1.91 m) | 235 lb (107 kg) | Jul 15, 2024 |
| Nick Townsend; ATH | Recruit ratings: Rivals: 247Sports: ESPN: (83) | | | | |
| Smith Orogbo; EDGE | Houston, TX | Alief Hastings High School | 6 ft 4 in (1.93 m) | 220 lb (100 kg) | Jul 1, 2024 |
| Smith Orogbo; EDGE | Recruit ratings: Rivals: 247Sports: ESPN: (83) | | | | |
| Myron Charles; DL | Port Charlotte, FL | Port Charlotte High School | 6 ft 4 in (1.93 m) | 295 lb (134 kg) | Sep 7, 2024 |
| Myron Charles; DL | Recruit ratings: Rivals: 247Sports: ESPN: (82) | | | | |
| Daylan McCutcheon; WR | Lucas, TX | Lovejoy High School | 5 ft 11 in (1.80 m) | 175 lb (79 kg) | Oct 10, 2024 |
| Daylan McCutcheon; WR | Recruit ratings: Rivals: 247Sports: ESPN: (82) | | | | |
| James Simon; RB | Shreveport, LA | Calvary Baptist Academy | 5 ft 11 in (1.80 m) | 200 lb (91 kg) | May 29, 2024 |
| James Simon; RB | Recruit ratings: Rivals: 247Sports: ESPN: (81) | | | | |
| Josiah Sharma; DL | Folsom, CA | Folsom High School | 6 ft 4.5 in (1.94 m) | 325 lb (147 kg) | Jul 25, 2024 |
| Josiah Sharma; DL | Recruit ratings: Rivals: 247Sports: ESPN: (80) | | | | |
| KJ Lacey Jr. QB | Saraland, AL | Saraland High School | 6 ft 0 in (1.83 m) | 175 lb (79 kg) | Jun 3, 2023 |
| KJ Lacey Jr. QB | Recruit ratings: Rivals: 247Sports: ESPN: (83) | | | | |
| Zelus Hicks; S | Carrollton, GA | Carrollton High School | 6 ft 2 in (1.88 m) | 190 lb (86 kg) | Sep 12, 2024 |
| Zelus Hicks; S | Recruit ratings: Rivals: 247Sports: ESPN: (84) | | | | |
| Nick Brooks; OT | Loganville, GA | Grayson High School | 6 ft 7 in (2.01 m) | 345 lb (156 kg) | Aug 23, 2024 |
| Nick Brooks; OT | Recruit ratings: Rivals: 247Sports: ESPN: (82) | | | | |
| Rickey Stewart; RB | Tyler, TX | Chapel Hill High School | 5 ft 10 in (1.78 m) | 180 lb (82 kg) | Apr 6, 2024 |
| Rickey Stewart; RB | Recruit ratings: Rivals: 247Sports: ESPN: (81) | | | | |
| Jonathan Cunningham; LB | Fort Worth, TX | North Crowley High School | 6 ft 2 in (1.88 m) | 195 lb (88 kg) | Jul 12, 2024 |
| Jonathan Cunningham; LB | Recruit ratings: Rivals: 247Sports: ESPN: (78) | | | | |
| Jackson Christian; OL | Port Neches, TX | Port Neches–Groves High School | 6 ft 5 in (1.96 m) | 309 lb (140 kg) | May 13, 2024 |
| Jackson Christian; OL | Recruit ratings: Rivals: 247Sports: ESPN: (77) | | | | |
| Emaree Winston; TE | Calhoun, GA | Calhoun High School | 6 ft 1.5 in (1.87 m) | 254 lb (115 kg) | Dec 18, 2023 |
| Emaree Winston; TE | Recruit ratings: Rivals: 247Sports: ESPN: (80) | | | | |
| Jordan Coleman; OT | Cedar Hill, TX | Cedar Hill High School | 6 ft 5 in (1.96 m) | 350 lb (160 kg) | May 25, 2024 |
| Jordan Coleman; OT | Recruit ratings: Rivals: 247Sports: ESPN: (78) | | | | |
| Caleb Chester; DB | Missouri City, TX | Thurgood Marshall High School | 6 ft 1 in (1.85 m) | 170 lb (77 kg) | Jun 11, 2024 |
| Caleb Chester; DB | Recruit ratings: Rivals: 247Sports: ESPN: (77) | | | | |
| Devin Coleman; OL | Cedar Hill, TX | Cedar Hill High School | 6 ft 4 in (1.93 m) | 340 lb (150 kg) | May 25, 2024 |
| Devin Coleman; OL | Recruit ratings: Rivals: 247Sports: ESPN: (74) | | | | |
Overall recruit ranking: Rivals: 1st 247Sports: 1st
Note: In many cases, Scout, Rivals, 247Sports, On3, and ESPN may conflict in their listings of height and weight.; In these cases, the average was taken. ESPN grades are on a 100-point scale.; Sources: "Rivals commits". Rivals.; "ESPN commits". ESPN.; "2025 Team Ranking". Rivals.com.; "247Sports commits". 247Sports.

==== 2025 overall class ranking ====
| Website | National rank | Conference rank | 5 star recruits | 4 star recruits | 3 star recruits | 2 star recruits | 1 star recruits | No star ranking |
|---|---|---|---|---|---|---|---|---|
| On3 Recruits | #1 | #1 | 5 | 13 | 7 | 0 | 0 | 0 |
| Rivals | #1 | #1 | 4 | 16 | 5 | 0 | 0 | 0 |
| 247 Sports | #1 | #1 | 4 | 14 | 7 | 0 | 0 | 0 |
| ESPN | — | — | 2 | 18 | 5 | 0 | 0 | 0 |

==== Walk-ons ====
| Name | Pos. | Height | Weight | Hometown | High school |
|---|---|---|---|---|---|
| Carson Berger | RB | 5'11 | 193 | Houston, TX | John Cooper School |

==== Coaching staff additions ====
| Name | New Position | Previous Team | Previous Position | Source |
|---|---|---|---|---|
| Chad Scott | Running backs | West Virginia | Offensive coordinator/running backs | |
| Duane Akina | Defensive backs | Arizona | Defensive coordinator | |
| Justin Garrett | Analyst | Boise State | Assistant wide receivers | |
| Jason McEndoo | Analyst | Oklahoma State | Tight ends/fullbacks | |
| LaAllan Clark | Outside linebackers | Ohio State | Defense graduate assistant | |
| Mark Orphey | Safeties | Rutgers | Defensive backs | |
| Matt Moran | Analyst | JMU | Assistant special teams | |

=== Returning starters ===
The Longhorns return 11 starters from the previous season. They return 3 on offense, 6 on defense, and 2 on special teams.

Offense
| Player | Class | Position |
|---|---|---|
| Quintrevion Wisner | Junior | RB |
| DeAndre Moore Jr. | Junior | WR |
| DJ Campbell | Senior | OL |

Defense
| Player | Class | Position |
|---|---|---|
| Trey Moore | Senior | EDGE |
| Anthony Hill Jr. | Junior | LB |
| Liona Lefau | Junior | LB |
| Malik Muhammad | Junior | DB |
| Michael Taaffe | Senior | DB |
| Jaylon Guilbeau | Senior | DB |

Special Teams
| Player | Class | Position |
|---|---|---|
| Will Stone | Senior | K |
| Lance St. Louis | Senior | DS |

== Awards and honors ==
=== SEC honors ===
All-SEC team
| Player | Position | Team |
|---|---|---|
| Trevor Goosby | OL | 1st team |
| Colin Simmons | EDGE | 1st team |
| Michael Taaffe | DB | 1st team |
| Ryan Wingo | WR | 2nd team |
| Anthony Hill Jr. | LB | 2nd team |
| Malik Muhammad | DB | 2nd team |
| Ryan Niblett | PR/KR | 2nd team |
| DJ Campbell | OL | 3rd team |
HM = Honorable mention. Source:

SEC All-Freshman team
| Player | Position |
|---|---|
| Lance Jackson | EDGE |
HM = Honorable mention. Source:

Weekly SEC honors
| Honors | Player | Position | Date Awarded | Ref. |
|---|---|---|---|---|
| Freshman of the Week | Parker Livingstone | WR | September 8, 2025 | |
| Defensive Player of the Week | Malik Muhammad | DB | October 13, 2025 | |
| Co-Defensive Lineman of the Week | Colin Simmons | EDGE | October 13, 2025 | |
| Co-Special Teams Player of the Week | Ryan Niblett | WR | October 13, 2025 | |
| Special Teams Player of the Week | Mason Shipley | PK | October 20, 2025 | |
| Co-Defensive Lineman of the Week | Colin Simmons | EDGE | October 20, 2025 | |
| Co-Defensive Player of the Week | Anthony Hill Jr. | LB | October 27, 2025 | |
| Co-Defensive Lineman of the Week | Ethan Burke | EDGE | October 27, 2025 | |
| Offensive Player of the Week | Arch Manning | QB | November 3, 2025 | |
| Co-Defensive Lineman of the Week | Colin Simmons | EDGE | November 3, 2025 | |
| Co-Defensive Lineman of the Week | Colin Simmons | EDGE | November 24, 2025 | |
| Co-Defensive Player of the Week | Ethan Burke | EDGE | December 1, 2025 | |
| Co-Offensive Lineman of the Week | Trevor Goosby | OL | December 1, 2025 | |

=== National honors ===
NCAA recognized All-American honors
| Player | AP | AFCA | FWAA | TSN | WCFF | Designation |
|---|---|---|---|---|---|---|
| Anthony Hill Jr. | 2nd | 2nd | 2nd | – | – | – |
| Colin Simmons | – | 2nd | – | 2nd | 2nd | – |
| Michael Taaffe | 3rd | **1st** | 2nd | – | – | – |
| Ryan Niblett | – | – | **1st** | – | – | – |
The NCAA recognizes a selection to all five of the AP, AFCA, FWAA, TSN and WCFF first teams for unanimous selections and three of five for consensus selections. 1st team in **bold**. HM = Honorable mention. Source:

Postseason national honors
| Honors | Player | Position | Date Awarded | Ref. |
|---|---|---|---|---|
| Wuerffel Trophy | Michael Taaffe | DB | December 12, 2025 | |

Weekly national honors
| Honors | Player | Position | Date Awarded | Ref. |
|---|---|---|---|---|
| Ray Guy Award's Ray 8 | Jack Bouwmeester | P | September 2, 2025 | |
| Shaun Alexander Freshman of the Week | Parker Livingstone | WR | September 9, 2025 | |
| Ray Guy Award's Ray 8 | Jack Bouwmeester | P | September 16, 2025 | |
| Lou Groza Award Stars of the Week | Mason Shipley | K | October 21, 2025 | |
| Manning Award Stars of the Week | Arch Manning | QB | October 27, 2025 | |
| Chuck Bednarik Player of the Week | Anthony Hill Jr. | LB | October 28, 2025 | |
| Walter Camp Defensive Player of the Week | Anthony Hill Jr. | LB | October 28, 2025 | |
| Manning Award Stars of the Week | Arch Manning | QB | November 3, 2025 | |
| Davey O'Brien Award's Great 8 | Arch Manning | QB | November 3, 2025 | |
| Associated Press’ National Player of the Week | Arch Manning | QB | November 24, 2025 | |
| Davey O'Brien Award's Great 8 | Arch Manning | QB | November 24, 2025 | |
| Manning Award Stars of the Week | Arch Manning | QB | November 24, 2025 | |
| Dodd Trophy Coach of the Week | Steve Sarkisian | - | December 1, 2025 | |
