= Brad Spence =

Brad or Bradley Spence may refer to:

- Brad Spence (skier) (born 1984), Canadian skier
- Brad Spence (American football) (born 2005), American football player
- Bradley Spence, British record producer
