= Colin Simmons =

American football player (born 2006)

No. 1 – Texas Longhorns
- Position: Defensive end
- Class: Junior

Personal information
- Born: January 8, 2006 (age 20)
- Listed height: 6 ft 3 in (1.91 m)
- Listed weight: 246 lb (112 kg)

Career information
- High school: Duncanville (Duncanville, Texas)
- College: Texas (2024–present)

Awards and highlights
- Second-team All-American (2025); First-team All-SEC (2025); Shaun Alexander Award (2024); Freshman All-American (2024); SEC All-Freshman Team (2024)
- Stats at ESPN

Colin Simmons (born January 8, 2006) is an American college football defensive end for the Texas Longhorns.

== Early life ==
Simmons was born on January 8, 2006. He attended Duncanville High School in Duncanville, Texas. As a senior, he played 10 games and recorded 45 tackles and seven sacks. According to 247Sports, Simmons was rated a 5-star edge, ranking 28th nationally and 4th at his position. Additionally, Simmons was rated a 5-star prospect by Rivals.com and On3 Recruiting. On August 10, 2023, Simmons committed to the University of Texas at Austin.

== College career ==
=== 2024 Season ===
Before the 2024 season, Simmons was listed on the preseason Shaun Alexander Freshman of the Year watchlist. Simmons earned immediate playing time as a freshman. During week five of the 2024 season, Simmons recorded 7 tackles and 2 sacks against Mississippi State. In the first round of the 2024-25 College Football Playoff against Clemson, Simmons logged one interception. In the Peach Bowl College Football Playoff quarterfinals, Simmons had one sack and five tackles. At the end of the season, Simmons was named the Shaun Alexander Freshman of the Year, Freshman All-American, and SEC All-Freshman team.

=== 2025 Season ===
Before the 2025 season, Simmons was named to the Lott Trophy, Bronko Nagurski Trophy, Walter Camp Award, Chuck Bednarik Award, and Lombardi Award watchlists. He was also named to the preseason All-SEC first team and preseason All-American first team. In the Red Rivalry Game against Oklahoma, Simmons recorded five tackles and 2.5 sacks, earning SEC Co-Defensive Lineman of the Week. After Week 7, he was selected to the midseason watch list for the Lombardi Award. In the overtime win against Kentucky in Week 8, Simmons posted a career high three sacks and his first forced fumble of the season, earning him SEC Co-Defensive Lineman of the Week for the second time in a row. In Week 10 against Vanderbilt, Simmons posted a strip-sack and fumble recovery, 1.5 tackles for a loss, and five tackles, earning him SEC Co-Defensive Lineman of the Week, making it the third time he received the honor in four weeks. In Week 13 against Arkansas, posted five tackles, 1.5 tackles for a loss, a career-high four pressures, and a sack-fumble that was returned by a teammate for a touchdown, earning him SEC Co-Defensive Lineman of the Week. At the end of the season, Simmons was named to the All-SEC first team and All-American second team.

=== 2026 Season ===
Before the 2026 season, Simmons was named to the Lott Trophy, Bronko Nagurski Trophy, Wuerffel Trophy, Lombardi Award, Walter Camp Award, and Chuck Bednarik Award watchlists. He was also named to the preseason All-SEC first team and preseason All-American first team. After Week 2, Simmons was named to the Allstate AFCA Good Works Team, which honors 22 college football players for extraordinary commitment to community service. In Week 4 against No. 14 Tennessee, Simmons recorded 5.5 sacks and a forced fumble, becoming the first FBS player in the last 20 seasons to have 5.0 or more sacks in a game against a ranked team. His 5.5 sacks tied the SEC single-game record and broke the Texas single-game record. For his performance, Simmons swept the major National Player of the Week honors, earning recognition from the Chuck Bednarik Award, Bronko Nagurski Trophy and Walter Camp Award. In Week 7 against Florida, Simmons was injured in the fourth quarter and missed the next game.

=== College statistics ===
| Year | Team | GP | Tackles | | | | | Interceptions | | | | | Fumbles | | | |
| Year | Team | GP | Solo | Ast | Cmb | TfL | Sck | Int | Yds | Avg | TD | PD | FR | Yds | TD | FF |
|---|---|---|---|---|---|---|---|---|---|---|---|---|---|---|---|---|
| 2024 | Texas | 16 | 31 | 17 | 48 | 14.0 | 9.0 | 1 | -2 | -2 | 0 | 2 | 0 | 0 | 0 | 3 |
| 2025 | Texas | 13 | 23 | 20 | 42 | 15.5 | 12.0 | 0 | 0 | 0 | 0 | 2 | 1 | 0 | 0 | 3 |
| 2026 | Texas | 6 | 17 | 8 | 25 | 16.0 | 10.5 | 0 | 0 | 0 | 0 | 0 | 1 | 0 | 0 | 2 |
| Career | | 35 | 71 | 45 | 116 | 45.5 | 31.5 | 1 | -2 | -2 | 0 | 4 | 2 | 0 | 0 | 8 |
