= Liona Lefau =

American football player (born 2004)

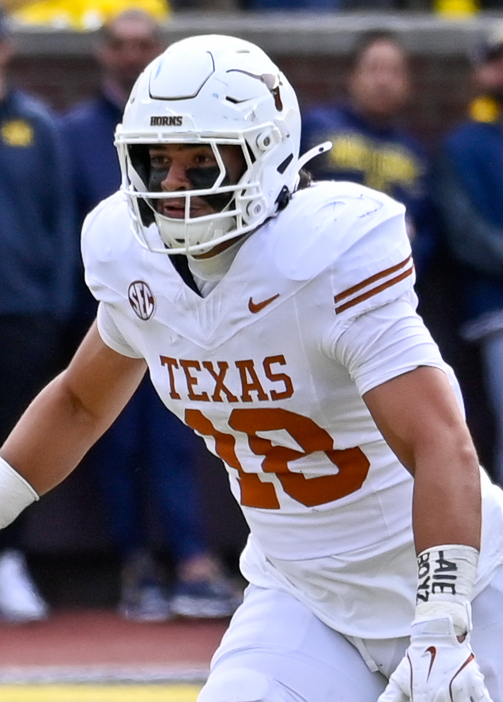
- Lefau in 2024

No. 17 – Colorado Buffaloes
- Position: Linebacker
- Class: Senior

Personal information
- Born: September 28, 2004 (age 22)
- Listed height: 6 ft 1 in (1.85 m)
- Listed weight: 230 lb (104 kg)

Career information
- High school: Kahuku (Kahuku, Hawaii)
- College: Texas (2023–2025); Colorado (2026–present)
- Stats at ESPN

Liona Lefau (born September 28, 2004) is an American college football linebacker for the Colorado Buffaloes. He previously played for the Texas Longhorns.

== Early life ==
Lefau attended high school at Kahuku located in Kahuku, Hawaii. Coming out of high school he was rated as a four-star recruit, the 29th overall linebacker, and the top player in the State of Hawaii in the class of 2023, where he committed to play college football for the Texas Longhorns.

== College career ==
=== Texas ===
During his freshman season in 2023, Lefau played in all 14 games, recording seven tackles.

In week four of the 2024 season, he notched seven tackles, a sack, and a safety, in a victory versus Louisiana–Monroe. In the 2024 regular season finale, Lefau tallied six tackles, a pass deflection, and a forced fumble in a win over rival Texas A&M. He finished the 2024 season, appearing in 16 games with ten starts, totaling 63 tackles with five going for a loss, two sacks, three pass deflections, an interception, and a forced fumble.

In week one of the 2025 season, Lefau recorded nine tackles with one being for a loss in a loss to Ohio State. In Week 13 against Arkansas, he recovered a fumble and returned it for a 52-yard touchdown.

=== Colorado ===
On January 8, 2026, Lefau transferred to Colorado.

=== College statistics ===
Year	Team	GP	Tackles					Interceptions				Fumbles			
Year	Team	GP	Solo	Ast	Cmb	TfL	Sck	Int	Yds	TD	PD	FR	Yds	TD	FF
2023	Texas	14	3	4	7	0.0	0.	0	0	0	0	0	0	0	0
2024	Texas	16	38	25	63	5.0	2.0	1	6	0	2	0	0	0	1
2025	Texas	12	27	42	69	3.0	1.0	0	0	0	3	1	52	1	0
Career		42	68	71	139	8.0	3.0	1	6	0	5	1	52	1	1
