= Jonah Williams (safety) =

American football player (born 2007)

No. 9 – Texas Longhorns
- Position: Safety
- Class: Sophomore

Personal information
- Born: May 17, 2007 (age 19); Galveston, Texas, U.S.
- Listed height: 6 ft 3 in (1.91 m)
- Listed weight: 210 lb (95 kg)

Career information
- High school: Ball (Galveston)
- College: Texas (2025–present)
- Stats at ESPN

Jonah Williams (born May 17, 2007) is an American college football safety for the Texas Longhorns. He is also an outfielder on the Longhorns' baseball team.

== Early life ==
Williams was born in Galveston, Texas, and attended Ball High School where he played both football and baseball. As a sophomore, he was named the District 9-5A MVP after recording 59 tackles, four interceptions and four punt return touchdowns. As a junior, he had 58 tackles with four interceptions and as a senior had 29 tackles and two interceptions, missing the second half of the season due to injury. Despite the injury his senior season, he was named the District 9-5A MVP a second time.

Williams was a five-star recruit and was rated as the top safety in his class. He committed to play both college football and college baseball at the University of Texas at Austin.

== College career ==
=== Baseball ===
Williams played 20 games for the Longhorns baseball team his freshman year in 2025, hitting .327/.383/.382 with 10 runs batted in (RBI) over 55 at-bats. After the season, he joined the football team for the 2025 season.

=== Football ===
Williams made his football debut on Week 4 against Sam Houston after missing the first three games due to a hamstring injury, playing eight special teams snaps and 11 defensive snaps and recording no stats.

=== College statistics ===
==== Football ====
| Year | Team | GP | Tackles | | | | | Interceptions | | | | | Fumbles | | | |
| Year | Team | GP | Solo | Ast | Cmb | TfL | Sck | Int | Yds | Avg | TD | PD | FR | Yds | TD | FF |
|---|---|---|---|---|---|---|---|---|---|---|---|---|---|---|---|---|
| 2025 | Texas | 8 | 5 | 4 | 9 | 0.0 | 0.0 | 0 | 0 | 0 | 0 | 0 | 0 | 0 | 0 | 0 |
| Career | | 8 | 5 | 4 | 9 | 0.0 | 0.0 | 0 | 0 | 0 | 0 | 0 | 0 | 0 | 0 | 0 |

== Personal life ==
His brother, Nick Williams, played in Major League Baseball (MLB).
