= Michael Taaffe =

American football player (born 2003)

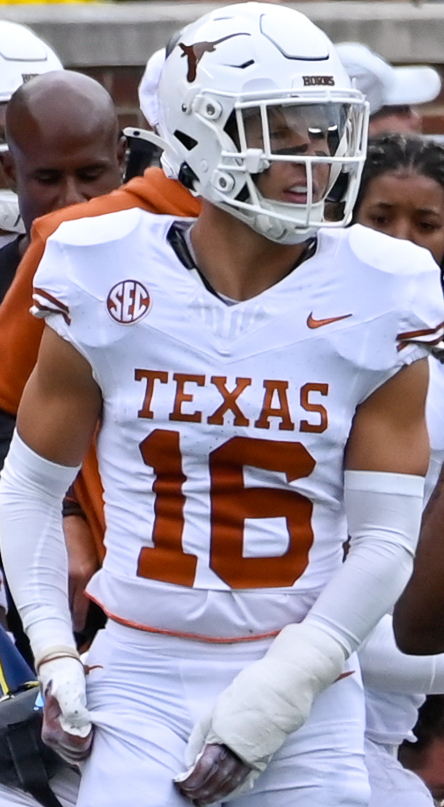
- Taaffe at Texas in 2024

No. 16 – Miami Dolphins
- Position: Safety
- Roster status: Active

Personal information
- Born: February 18, 2003 (age 23); Austin, Texas, U.S.
- Listed height: 6 ft 0 in (1.83 m)
- Listed weight: 190 lb (86 kg)

Career information
- High school: Westlake (Austin)
- College: Texas (2021–2025)
- NFL draft: 2026: 5th round, 158th overall pick

Career history
- Miami Dolphins (2026–present)

Awards and highlights
- Wuerffel Trophy (2025); First-team All-SEC (2025); First-team All-American (2025); Second-team All-American (2024)

Career NFL statistics as of Week 10, 2026
- Tackles: 50
- Forced fumbles: 1
- Pass deflections: 3
- Interceptions: 3
- Stats at Pro Football Reference

Michael Joseph Taaffe (born February 18, 2003) is an American professional football safety for the Miami Dolphins of the National Football League (NFL). He played college football for the Texas Longhorns and was selected by the Dolphins in the fifth round of the 2026 NFL draft.

== Early life ==
Taaffe was born in Austin, Texas where he attended Westlake High School. He played cornerback and wide receiver in high school. As a senior, Taaffe recorded 60 tackles and five interceptions while catching 18 passes for 297 yards and three touchdown receptions. Taaffe's most notable high school highlight is intercepting Carroll Senior High School and future Texas Quarterback Quinn Ewers twice in their state championship game. Also, Taaffe helped lead Westlake to back-to-back state championship titles. On November 5, 2020, Taaffe committed to Rice. However, Taaffe was offered a walk-on spot at Texas and decided to accept the Longhorns offer.

== College career ==
=== 2021 ===
Taaffe was a walk-on at Texas and saw no playing time during his freshman year.

=== 2022 ===
When Taaffe was a redshirt freshman, he played in 13 games totaling 26 combined tackles. Prior to the Alamo Bowl, Taaffe was granted a full scholarship by Texas head coach Steve Sarkisian on December 18, 2022.

=== 2023 ===
During Taaffe's sophomore season, he amassed a total of 48 tackles and 3 interceptions. This led to Taaffe earning honorable mention All-Big 12 and a Burlsworth Trophy nominee.

=== 2024 ===
During Taaffe's junior season, he earned SEC co-defensive player of the week and Burlsworth Trophy walk-on of the week honors. Taaffe also earned second team AP All-American honors. During the 2024 College Football Playoffs, a high hit by Taaffe led to the Big 12 commissioner to call for consistency in targeting penalty calls. He ended the season with 78 tackles, 10 pass deflections, 2 sacks, 1 forced fumble, and 5 interceptions.

=== 2025 ===
Taaffe chose to return to Texas for his fifth and final year, forgoing the NFL draft. After Week 3, he was named to the Allstate AFCA Good Works Team, which honors 22 college football players for extraordinary commitment to community service. In Week 6 against Florida, Taaffe recorded his first interception of the season. After Week 7, he was named a Jason Witten Collegiate Man of the Year semifinalist. In Week 8 against Kentucky, Taaffe suffered a thumb injury in the fourth quarter and missed the next two games. At the end of October, Taaffe was named a semifinalist for the Jim Thorpe Award. On December 4, he was named to the SEC Football Community Service Team. On December 8, Taaffe was recognized as a finalist for the Burlsworth Trophy at the award ceremony, becoming the first Longhorn in program to be selected as a finalist. At the end of the season, Taaffe was named to the All-SEC first team and won the Wuerffel Trophy. On December 15, 2025, Taaffe declared for the NFL draft.

=== College statistics ===
Year	Team	GP	Tackles					Interceptions				Fumbles			
Year	Team	GP	Solo	Ast	Cmb	TfL	Sck	Int	Yds	TD	PD	FR	Yds	TD	FF
2021	Texas	0	0	0	0	0	0.0	0	0	0	0	0	0	0	0
2022	Texas	13	13	13	26	0.5	0.0	0	0	0	1	0	0	0	0
2023	Texas	14	28	20	48	2.5	0.0	3	45	0	2	0	0	0	0
2024	Texas	16	40	38	78	5.5	2.0	2	9	0	10	1	0	0	1
2025	Texas	10	38	32	70	1.0	1.0	2	0	0	1	0	0	0	0
Career		53	119	103	222	9.5	3.0	7	54	0	14	1	0	0	1

== Professional career ==
Pre-draft measurables
Height	Weight	Arm length	Hand span	Wingspan	40-yard dash	10-yard split	20-yard split	20-yard shuttle	Three-cone drill	Vertical jump	Broad jump
5 ft 11 7/8 in (1.83 m)	190 lb (86 kg)	29 1/4 in (0.74 m)	9 3/8 in (0.24 m)	6 ft 0 3/4 in (1.85 m)	4.50 s	1.58 s	2.63 s	4.15 s	6.80 s	34.5 in (0.88 m)	10 ft 2 in (3.10 m)
All values from NFL Combine/Pro Day

Taaffe was selected by the Miami Dolphins with the 158th overall pick in the fifth round of the 2026 NFL draft. He signed his four-year rookie contract worth $4.88 million.

Taaffe made his NFL debut on Week 1 as the starting safety against the Las Vegas Raiders, recording one interception and three tackles. In Week 7 against the New York Jets, he recorded one interception, becoming the first Dolphins player to record multiple interceptions in the first six games of his career.

== Personal life ==
Taaffe is a Christian.
