= Ryan Niblett =

American football player (born 2004)

No. 21 – Texas Longhorns
- Position: Wide receiver
- Class: Redshirt Junior

Personal information
- Born: November 17, 2004 (age 21)
- Listed height: 5 ft 10 in (1.78 m)
- Listed weight: 187 lb (85 kg)

Career information
- High school: Eisenhower (Houston, Texas)
- College: Texas (2023–present)

Awards and highlights
- First-team All-American (2025); Second-team All-SEC (2025)
- Stats at ESPN

Ryan Niblett (born November 17, 2004) is an American football wide receiver for the Texas Longhorns.

== Early life ==
Niblett attended Eisenhower High School in Houston, Texas. As a senior, he caught 55 passes for 1,088 yards and 10 touchdowns. Coming out of high school, Niblett was rated as a four-star recruit, and the 96th overall player in the class of 2023, and committed to play college football for the Texas Longhorns over offers from other schools such as Alabama, USC, Texas A&M, LSU, and Penn State.

== College career ==
As a freshman at the University of Texas at Austin in 2023, Niblett played in three games. During the 2024 season, he rushed for 23 yards and a touchdown on eight carries, while also hauling in three passes for 24 yards. In Week 7 of the 2025 season, Niblett returned a punt 75 yards for a touchdown over rival Oklahoma. In Week 8, he returned two punts for 88 yards, setting up two scoring drivings for the Longhorns, in a win over Kentucky. In Week 9, Niblett took a punt back 79 yards to force overtime in a victory over Mississippi State. Niblett ended the season with 476 punt return yards, 262 kick return yards, and two punt return touchdowns. For his performance during the 2025 season, he was named a first-team all-American by FWAA. In Week 7 of the 2026 season, Niblett returned a punt 63 yards for a touchdown over Florida.

=== College Statistics ===
Year	Team	GP	Receiving				Rushing			Punt returns				Kick returns			
Year	Team	GP	Rec	Yds	Avg	TD	Att	Yds	TD	Ret	Yds	Avg	TD	Ret	Yds	Avg	TD
2023	Texas	3	0	0	0.0	0	0	0	0	0	0	0.0	0	0	0	0	0
2024	Texas	15	3	24	8.0	0	8	23	1	0	0	0.0	0	0	0	0	0
2025	Texas	13	8	60	7.5	0	5	15	0	21	476	22.7	2	13	262	20.2	0
Career		31	11	84	7.6	0	13	38	1	21	476	22.7	2	13	262	20.2	0
