= Landon Jackson =

American football player (born 2003)

No. 94 – Buffalo Bills
- Position: Defensive end
- Roster status: Active

Personal information
- Born: January 2, 2003 (age 23); Texarkana, Texas, U.S.
- Listed height: 6 ft 6 in (1.98 m)
- Listed weight: 264 lb (120 kg)

Career information
- High school: Pleasant Grove (Texarkana, Texas)
- College: LSU (2021); Arkansas (2022–2024)
- NFL draft: 2025: 3rd round, 72nd overall pick

Career history
- Buffalo Bills (2025–present)

Awards and highlights
- First-team All-SEC (2023); Second-team All-SEC (2024)

Career NFL statistics as of Week 11, 2026
- Tackles: 18
- Sacks: 1
- Pass deflections: 1
- Stats at Pro Football Reference

Landon Jackson (born January 2, 2003) is an American professional football defensive end for the Buffalo Bills of the National Football League (NFL). He played college football for the LSU Tigers and Arkansas Razorbacks. Jackson was selected by the Bills in the third round of the 2025 NFL draft.

== Early life ==
Jackson was born on January 2, 2003 in Texarkana, Texas. He attended Pleasant Grove High School in Texarkana where as a junior, he had 17 sacks and was named the Texas Sports Writers Association 4A Defensive Player of the Year. Jackson committed to Louisiana State University (LSU) to play college football.

== College career ==
Jackson played in five games as a true freshman at LSU in 2021. After one year at LSU, he transferred to the University of Arkansas. In his first year at Arkansas in 2022, he played in all 13 games with seven starts and had 23 tackles and three sacks. Jackson returned to Arkansas his junior year in 2023. He started all 12 games and finished the season with 44 tackles, 13.5 tackles for lost yardage, and 6.5 sacks. Jackson was named to the Coaches 1st Team 2023 All-SEC football team, and was placed on the 2nd Team All-SEC squad by the AP. He elected to return to Arkansas for his senior season in 2024. He helped Arkansas to a 6-6 record and reach the 2024 Liberty Bowl, but Jackson decided to forego his participation in the bowl game in order to prepare for the NFL draft. He was named 2nd team All-SEC for the 2024 season. Jackson played in the 2025 Senior Bowl, where he finished the game with 1.5 tackles and a strip-sack.

== Professional career ==
Pre-draft measurables
Height	Weight	Arm length	Hand span	Wingspan	40-yard dash	10-yard split	20-yard split	20-yard shuttle	Three-cone drill	Vertical jump	Broad jump
6 ft 6 in (1.98 m)	264 lb (120 kg)	33 1/4 in (0.84 m)	10 in (0.25 m)	6 ft 11 5/8 in (2.12 m)	4.68 s	1.65 s	2.72 s	4.55 s	7.13 s	40.5 in (1.03 m)	10 ft 9 in (3.28 m)
All values from NFL Combine/Pro Day

Jackson was selected in the third round by the Buffalo Bills with the 72nd pick of the 2025 NFL draft. He was placed on injured reserve on November 11, 2025, after suffering a torn MCL and PCL in Week 10 against the Miami Dolphins.

== Personal life ==
Jackson has alopecia. His younger brother Lance Jackson plays for the Texas Longhorns. He is married to Grace Jackson.
