= Emaree Winston =

American football player (born 2006)

No. 85 – Texas Longhorns
- Position: Tight end
- Class: Sophomore

Personal information
- Born: July 26, 2006 (age 20)
- Listed height: 6 ft 1 in (1.85 m)
- Listed weight: 245 lb (111 kg)

Career information
- High school: Calhoun (Calhoun, Georgia)
- College: Texas (2025–present)
- Stats at ESPN

Emaree Winston (born July 26, 2006) is an American college football tight end for the Texas Longhorns.

== Early life ==
Winston attended Calhoun High School in Calhoun, Georgia. He committed to the University of Texas at Austin to play college football over offers from Ohio State and UCF.

== College career ==
As a freshman in 2025, Winston played sparingly, totaling two receptions for 47 yards. His role increased the following season, and he played a key role in Texas's win over No. 1 Ohio State, catching a critical fourth-down pass that kept the Longhorns' first touchdown drive alive. He finished the game with three receptions for 39 yards and an offensive fumble recovery. Following the game, Winston was expected to play a larger role in the Longhorns' offense.

Season	Team	GP	Receiving			
Season	Team	GP	Rec	Yds	Avg	TD
2025	Texas	6	2	47	23.5	0
2026	Texas	2	5	64	12.8	1
Career		8	7	111	15.9	1
