= Kade Phillips =

American football player

No. 8 – Texas Longhorns
- Position: Cornerback
- Class: Freshman

Personal information
- Listed height: 6 ft 0 in (1.83 m)
- Listed weight: 190 lb (86 kg)

Career information
- High school: Hightower (Missouri City, Texas)
- College: Texas (2025–present)
- Stats at ESPN

Kade Phillips is an American college football cornerback for the Texas Longhorns.

== Early life ==
Phillips attended Hightower High School in Missouri City, Texas. A five-star recruit and one of the top ranked cornerbacks in his class, he was selected to play in the 2025 Navy All-American Bowl. He originally committed to play college football at the University of Texas at Austin before flipping to Louisiana State University (LSU) and then back to Texas.

== College career ==
Phillips made his collegiate debut against San Jose State, recording one pass break-up. He made his first career start late in the season against Arkansas. Phillips finished his freshman year playing in 12 games and recorded six pass break-ups and 22 tackles, including two tackles for a loss.

=== College statistics ===
Year	Team	GP	Tackles					Interceptions					Fumbles			
Year	Team	GP	Solo	Ast	Cmb	TfL	Sck	Int	Yds	Avg	TD	PD	FR	Yds	TD	FF
2025	Texas	12	16	6	22	2.0	0.0	0	0	0	0	6	0	0	0	0
Career		12	16	6	22	2.0	0.0	0	0	0	0	6	0	0	0	0
