= Nick Martin (linebacker) =

American football player (born 2002)

Nickolas Martin
No. 45 – San Francisco 49ers
- Position: Linebacker
- Roster status: Injured reserve

Personal information
- Born: October 13, 2002 (age 24); Texarkana, Texas, U.S.
- Listed height: 5 ft 11 in (1.80 m)
- Listed weight: 221 lb (100 kg)

Career information
- High school: Pleasant Grove (Texarkana, Texas)
- College: Oklahoma State (2021–2024)
- NFL draft: 2025: 3rd round, 75th overall pick

Career history
- San Francisco 49ers (2025–present)

Awards and highlights
- First-team All-Big 12 (2023)

Career NFL statistics as of 2025
- Total tackles: 11
- Forced fumbles: 1
- Stats at Pro Football Reference

Nickolas Martin (born October 13, 2002) is an American professional football linebacker for the San Francisco 49ers of the National Football League (NFL). He played college football for the Oklahoma State Cowboys and was selected by the 49ers in the third round of the 2025 NFL draft.

== Early life ==
Martin attended Pleasant Grove High School. He was ranked as a three-star recruit and committed to play college football for the Oklahoma State Cowboys.

== College career ==
In Martin's first season in 2021, he only recorded one tackle. In 2022, he recorded 15 total tackles in 13 games. Martin earned a starting role ahead of the 2023 season. In week 6 of the 2023 season, he notched 17 tackles with two and a half going for a loss, a sack, and an interception in a win over Kansas State. In week 8, Martin recorded 17 tackles with one and a half being for a loss. In week 12, he recorded 12 tackles with three going for a loss, and a sack to help defeat Houston. For his performance on the 2023 season, Martin was named first-team all-Big 12 Conference.

== Professional career ==
Pre-draft measurables
Height	Weight	Arm length	Hand span	Wingspan	40-yard dash	10-yard split	20-yard split	20-yard shuttle	Three-cone drill	Vertical jump	Broad jump	Bench press
5 ft 11 1/2 in (1.82 m)	221 lb (100 kg)	31 3/4 in (0.81 m)	9 1/4 in (0.23 m)	6 ft 6 3/8 in (1.99 m)	4.53 s	1.54 s	2.64 s	4.23 s	7.20 s	38.0 in (0.97 m)	10 ft 3 in (3.12 m)	26 reps
All values from NFL Combine/Pro Day

The San Francisco 49ers selected Martin in the third round, with the 75th overall pick in the 2025 NFL draft. In seven appearances for San Francisco, he recorded one forced fumble and 11 combined tackles. On December 20, 2025, Martin was placed on season-ending injured reserve due to a concussion suffered in Week 13 against the Cleveland Browns.

On August 31, 2026, Martin was placed on injured reserve due to a hamstring injury suffered in training camp.

== NFL career statistics ==
=== Regular season ===
Year	Team	Games		Tackles					Interceptions						Fumbles				
Year	Team	GP	GS	Cmb	Solo	Ast	Sck	TFL	Int	Yds	Avg	Lng	TD	PD	FF	Fum	FR	Yds	TD
2025	SF	7	0	11	8	3	0.0	0	0	0	0.0	0	0	0	1	0	0	0	0
Career		7	0	11	8	3	0.0	0	0	0	0.0	0	0	0	1	0	0	0	0
