= Lance Jackson =

American football player

No. 40 – Texas Longhorns
- Position: Defensive end
- Class: Sophomore

Personal information
- Listed height: 6 ft 5 in (1.96 m)
- Listed weight: 272 lb (123 kg)

Career information
- High school: Pleasant Grove (Texarkana, Texas)
- College: Texas (2025–present)

Awards and highlights
- SEC All-Freshman Team (2025)
- Stats at ESPN

Lance Jackson is an American college football defensive end for the Texas Longhorns.

== Early life ==
Jackson is from Texarkana, Texas. His brother, Landon Jackson, played college football for the Arkansas Razorbacks and later in the NFL. Jackson attended Pleasant Grove High School in Texarkana where he played football as a defensive end and tight end. He was named first-team all-district at both positions and earned first-team All-American honors from MaxPreps as a freshman. He then was named first-team all-district as a sophomore. Jackson was named the city defensive lineman of the year by the Texarkana Gazette as a junior in 2023, when he posted 69 tackles, 7.5 tackles-for-loss (TFLs) and three sacks.

Jackson was named Class 4A first-team all-state as a senior in 2024 when he tallied 63 tackles, 28.5 TFLs and nine sacks while helping Pleasant grove to the third round of the 4A D-II state playoffs. A five-star prospect, he was ranked by On3.com as the fifth-best player nationally in the class of 2025. He committed to play college football for the Texas Longhorns.

== College career ==
Jackson began practicing with Texas in December 2024, amidst their appearance in the 2024–25 College Football Playoff. As a true freshman in 2025, he appeared in all 12 regular season games and in those games posted 15 tackles, two TFLs and two sacks, being named to the Southeastern Conference (SEC) All-Freshman team as the only Texas player selected.

=== College statistics ===
Year	Team	GP	Tackles					Interceptions					Fumbles			
Year	Team	GP	Solo	Ast	Cmb	TfL	Sck	Int	Yds	Avg	TD	PD	FR	Yds	TD	FF
2025	Texas	12	5	10	15	2.0	2.0	0	0	0.0	0	0	0	0	0	0
Career		12	5	10	15	2.0	2.0	0	0	0.0	0	0	0	0	0	0
