= Hero Kanu =

American football player (born 2004)

No. 93 – Texas Longhorns
- Position: Defensive tackle
- Class: Redshirt Senior

Personal information
- Born: September 14, 2004 (age 22)
- Listed height: 6 ft 5 in (1.96 m)
- Listed weight: 299 lb (136 kg)

Career information
- High school: Santa Margarita Catholic (Rancho Santa Margarita, California)
- College: Ohio State (2022–2024); Texas (2025–present)

Awards and highlights
- CFP national champion (2024)
- Stats at ESPN

Hero Kanu (born September 14, 2004) is a German American football defensive tackle for the Texas Longhorns. He previously played for the Ohio State Buckeyes.

== Early life ==
Kanu grew up in Germany where he used to be a soccer player. He started playing American football at the age of 14 after meeting Brandon Collier. Kanu moved to California in October 2020, where he played American football at the Santa Margarita Catholic High School in Rancho Santa Margarita, California. He was rated as a four-star recruit and the 105th overall prospect in the class of 2022 and committed to play college football for the Ohio State Buckeyes over offers from other schools such as Georgia, Notre Dame, and USC.

== College career ==
=== Ohio State ===
During his first three seasons with the Buckeyes from 2022 through 2024, Kanu appeared in 29 games, helping the Buckeyes win a National Championship, where he notched 14 tackles with one being for a loss, and a lone sack in the 2023 season versus Indiana. After the 2024 season, Kanu entered his name into the NCAA transfer portal.

=== Texas ===
Kanu transferred to play for the Texas Longhorns. In week 3 of the 2025 season, he notched two tackles for a loss and a sack in a win over UTEP. He ended the season with 30 tackles, including two sacks.

=== College statistics ===
Year	Team	GP	Tackles					Interceptions					Fumbles			
Year	Team	GP	Solo	Ast	Cmb	TfL	Sck	Int	Yds	Avg	TD	PD	FR	Yds	TD	FF
2022	Ohio State	3	0	0	0	0.0	0	0	0	0.0	0	0	0	0	0	0
2023	Ohio State	11	8	2	10	1.0	1.0	0	0	0.0	0	0	0	0	0	0
2024	Ohio State	15	1	3	4	0.0	0.0	0	0	0.0	0	0	0	0	0	0
2025	Texas	12	8	22	30	4.0	2.0	0	0	0.0	0	1	0	0	0	0
Career		41	17	27	44	5.0	3.0	0	0	0.0	0	1	0	0	0	0
