= Jack Bouwmeester =

Australian gridiron football player (born 1999)

No. 14 – Los Angeles Rams
- Position: Punter
- Roster status: Practice squad

Personal information
- Born: 7 May 1999 (age 27); Bendigo, Australia
- Listed height: 6 ft 2 in (1.88 m)
- Listed weight: 196 lb (89 kg)

Career information
- High school: Catholic Bendigo (Bendigo, Victoria)
- College: Michigan State (2019–2021); Utah (2022–2024); Texas (2025)
- NFL draft: 2026: undrafted

Career history
- San Francisco 49ers (2026)*; Los Angeles Rams (2026–present)*
- * Offseason or practice squad member only

Awards and highlights
- First-team All-Pac-12 (2023); Second-team All-Big 12 (2024)
- Stats at Pro Football Reference

Jack Bouwmeester (born 7 May 1999) is an Australian gridiron football punter for the Los Angeles Rams of the National Football League (NFL). He played college football for the Michigan State Spartans, Texas Longhorns, and for the Utah Utes.

== Early life ==
Bouwmeester was born and grew up in Bendigo, Australia. He is the son of Martin and Jodie Bouwmeester. He attended Bendigo Catholic College where he played soccer and cricket. Bouwmeester moved to the United States, where he committed to play college football for the Michigan State Spartans.

== College career ==
=== Michigan State ===
In three seasons at Michigan State from 2019 to 2021, Bouwmeester did not appear in any games. After the conclusion of the 2021 season, he entered the NCAA transfer portal.

=== Utah ===
Bouwmeester transferred to play for the Utah Utes in the 2024 season . He earned the Utes starting punter job in 2022 and punted 39 times for an average of 39.2 yards per punt. In the 2023 season opener, Bouwmeester punted six times for 311 yards, with a career-long of 64 yards and three inside of the 20-yard line, in a victory over Florida. He finished the 2023 season with 55 punts for an average of 45.5 yards per punt, and 20 landing inside the 20-yard line. In 2024, Bouwmeester punted 60 times for an average of 44.7 yards per punt. After the conclusion of the season, he once again entered the NCAA transfer portal.

=== Texas ===
Bouwmeester transferred again to play for the Texas Longhorns for the 2025 season. In his lone season as the Longhorns punter, he punted 59 times for an average of 44.5 yards per punt.

== Professional career ==
Pre-draft measurables
Height	Weight	Arm length	Hand span	Wingspan
6 ft 1 5/8 in (1.87 m)	205 lb (93 kg)	31 3/4 in (0.81 m)	8 7/8 in (0.23 m)	6 ft 3 1/2 in (1.92 m)
All values from Pro Day

=== San Francisco 49ers ===
After not being selected in the 2026 NFL draft, Bouwmeester signed with the San Francisco 49ers as an undrafted free agent on July 18, 2026. On August 12, Bouwmeester was waived by the 49ers.

=== Los Angeles Rams ===
On August 16, 2026, Bouwmeester signed with the Los Angeles Rams. On August 30, he was waived by Los Angeles as a part of final roster cuts; he was re-signed to the team's practice squad the following day.
