= Justus Terry =

American football player

No. 15 – Texas Longhorns
- Position: Defensive lineman
- Class: Sophomore

Personal information
- Listed height: 6 ft 5 in (1.96 m)
- Listed weight: 287 lb (130 kg)

Career information
- High school: Manchester (Manchester, Georgia)
- College: Texas (2025–present)
- Stats at ESPN

Justus Terry is an American college football defensive lineman for the Texas Longhorns. He was a five-star recruit and one of the top prospects in the 2025 recruiting class.

== Early life ==
Terry is from Manchester, Georgia. He attended Manchester High School where he competed in football, basketball and track and field. A defensive lineman in football, he totaled 38 tackles and four sacks as a sophomore at Manchester. He then had 74 solo tackles and 13 sacks as a junior in 2023, helping Manchester to a runner-up finish at the state championship while being selected first-team all-state; he was also chosen to The Atlanta Constitution's Super 11 team prior to his senior year. Terry had 19 tackles and four tackles-for-loss in two games as a senior before missing the rest of the year after an injury.

Terry was ranked a five-star prospect, the second-best defensive lineman and a top-15 player overall in the nation. He committed to play college football for the Georgia Bulldogs in January 2023. He flipped his commitment to the USC Trojans in March 2024, before later de-committing from USC in June. He later committed to the Texas Longhorns in December 2024.

== College career ==
Terry enrolled at Texas in 2025 and impressed early. He made his debut in Week 2 against San Jose State, recording one tackle.

=== College statistics ===
Year	Team	GP	Tackles					Interceptions				Fumbles			
Year	Team	GP	Solo	Ast	Cmb	TfL	Sck	Int	Yds	TD	PD	FR	Yds	TD	FF
2025	Texas	10	4	4	8	1.5	0.0	0	0	0	0	0	0	0	0
Career		10	4	4	8	1.5	0.0	0	0	0	0	0	0	0	0
