= Christian Clark (American football) =

American football player (born 2006)

No. 10 – South Carolina Gamecocks
- Position: Running back
- Class: (redshirt) Sophomore

Personal information
- Born: April 28, 2006 (age 20)
- Listed height: 6 ft 0 in (1.83 m)
- Listed weight: 212 lb (96 kg)

Career information
- High school: Mountain Pointe (Ahwatukee, Arizona)
- College: Texas (2024–2025); South Carolina (2026–present)
- Stats at ESPN

Christian Clark (born April 28, 2006) is an American college football running back for the South Carolina Gamecocks. He previously played for the Texas Longhorns.

== Early life ==
Clark attended Mountain Pointe High School in Ahwatukee, Arizona. He began his high school career at Desert Vista High School, before transferring to Mountain Pointe prior to his junior year. As a junior, Clark rushed for 737 yards and 11 touchdowns on 103 carries. Following his high school career, he committed to play college football at the University of Texas at Austin over offers from Alabama, Georgia, and Oregon among others.

== College career ==
In 2024, Clark suffered a season-ending injury during fall camp, tearing an Achilles tendon, requiring surgery. He made his collegiate debut the following season, rushing for his first career touchdown against Sam Houston. Clark made his first career start against Michigan in the 2025 Citrus Bowl, rushing for 105 yards and a touchdown on 20 carries. At the end of the season, he entered the transfer portal.

On January 16, 2026, Clark announced his decision to transfer to the University of South Carolina to play for the South Carolina Gamecocks.

=== Statistics ===
College statistics
Season	Team	Games	Rushing				Receiving			
Season	Team	GP	Att	Yards	Avg	TD	Rec	Yards	Avg	TD
2024	Texas	Redshirted (redshirt)								
2025	Texas	7	35	131	3.7	1	4	57	14.3	0
Career		7	35	131	3.7	1	4	57	14.3	0
