= Parker Livingstone =

American football player (born 2006)

No. 3 – Oklahoma Sooners
- Position: Wide receiver
- Class: Redshirt Sophomore

Personal information
- Born: February 16, 2006 (age 20)
- Listed height: 6 ft 4 in (1.93 m)
- Listed weight: 191 lb (87 kg)

Career information
- High school: Lovejoy (Lucas, Texas)
- College: Texas (2024–2025); Oklahoma (2026–present)
- Stats at ESPN

Parker Livingstone (born February 16, 2006) is an American college football wide receiver for the Oklahoma Sooners. He previously played for the Texas Longhorns.

== Early life ==
Livingstone attended high school at Lovejoy located in Lucas, Texas. During his high school career, he totaled 115 receptions for 2,207 yards and 31 touchdowns. Coming out of high school, Livingstone was rated as a four star recruit, the 52nd overall wide receiver, the 54th overall player in the State of Texas, and the 342nd overall player in the class of 2024. Additionally, he held offers from schools such as Georgia, Michigan, Wisconsin, Oklahoma State, Texas, and Utah. Ultimately, Livingstone committed to play college football for the Texas Longhorns.

== College career ==
=== Texas ===
During his first collegiate season in 2024, he appeared in four games, using the season to redshirt.

In the Longhorns' first game of the 2025 season, Livingstone made his first collegiate start. He caught two passes for 47 yards, including a 32-yard touchdown, in the loss versus Ohio State. In Week 2 against San Jose State, Livingstone recorded his first 100+ yard performance, gathering 4 receptions for 128 yards and two touchdowns, and was named both SEC Freshman of the Week and Shaun Alexander Freshman of the Week. In the overtime win against Mississippi State in Week 9, Livingstone recorded four receptions for 22 yards and two touchdowns. In Week 13 against Arkansas, he recorded two receptions for 104 yards and a touchdown, along with a passing touchdown to Arch Manning. At the end of the season, Livingstone announced that he would be entering the transfer portal.

=== Oklahoma ===
On January 6, 2026, Livingstone transferred to Oklahoma.

=== College statistics ===
Year	Team	Games		Receiving				Passing							
Year	Team	GP	GS	Rec	Yds	Avg	TD	Cmp	Att	Pct	Yds	Avg	TD	Int	Rtg
2024	Texas	Redshirted (redshirt)													
2025	Texas	13	7	29	516	17.8	6	1	1	100.0	4	4.0	1	0	124.58
Career		17	7	29	516	17.8	6	1	1	100.0	4	4.0	1	0	124.58
