= Kaliq Lockett =

American football player (born 2006)

No. 7 – Texas Longhorns
- Position: Wide receiver
- Class: Redshirt Freshman

Personal information
- Born: December 12, 2006 (age 19)
- Listed height: 6 ft 2 in (1.88 m)
- Listed weight: 186 lb (84 kg)

Career information
- High school: Sachse (Sachse, Texas)
- College: Texas (2025–present)

Kaliq Lockett (born December 12, 2006) is an American college football wide receiver for the Texas Longhorns.

== Early life ==
Lockett grew up in Sachse, Texas. He attended Sachse High School where he played football as a wide receiver and also competed in track and field. In football, he made the varsity team as a freshman, recording 13 receptions for 260 yards and three touchdowns that year. He then caught 28 passes for 482 yards and five touchdowns as a sophomore.

As a junior, Lockett helped Sachse reach the playoffs while totaling 59 catches for 1,299 yards and 13 touchdowns. He then caught 47 passes for 625 yards and seven touchdowns as a senior in 2024 and was a first-team all-district selection. He was selected for the All-American Bowl. A five-star recruit, he was ranked a top-15 prospect nationally and the second-best wide receiver. He committed to play college football for the Texas Longhorns. While at Sachse, he also started his own clothing brand – AØM Clothing.

== College career ==
Prior to his freshman season, Lockett was named to the Shaun Alexander Freshman of the Year Award watchlist. He made his college debut in Week 2 of the 2025 season against San Jose State, logging two receptions for 22 yards. In the 2026 season, Lockett took snaps in the first two games of the season before missing the next five games due to an undisclosed injury.

=== Statistics ===
Year	Team	Games		Receiving				Rushing			
Year	Team	GP	GS	Rec	Yards	Avg	TD	Att	Yards	Avg	TD
2025	Texas	5	0	5	47	9.4	1	0	0	0.0	0
Career		5	0	5	47	9.4	1	0	0	0.0	0
