= Malik Muhammad =

American football player (born 2004)

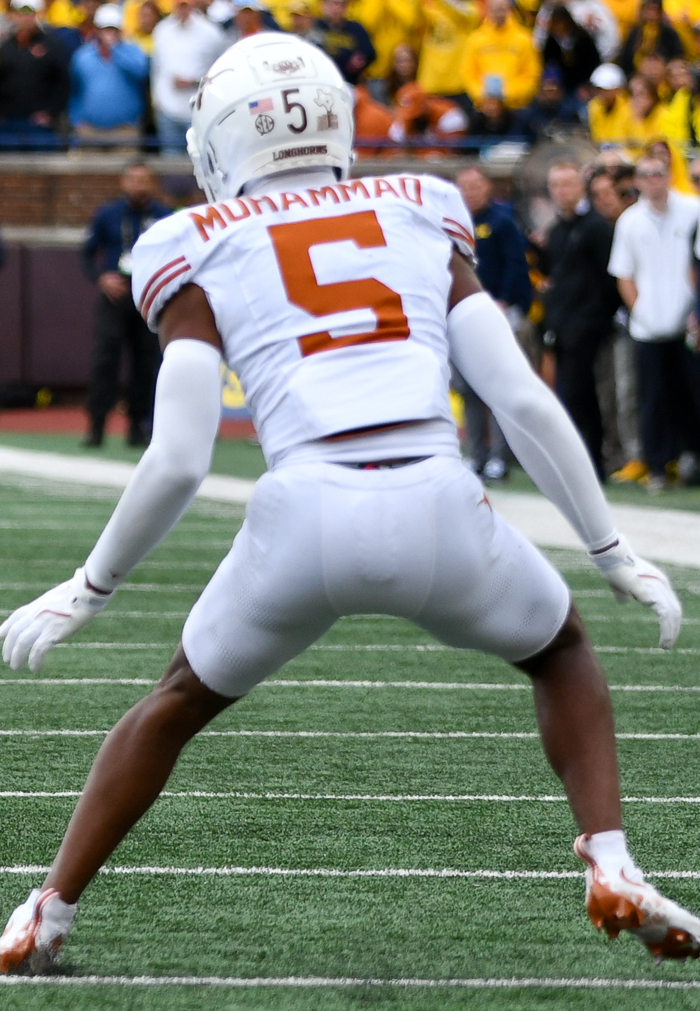
- Muhammad in 2024

No. 24 – Chicago Bears
- Position: Cornerback
- Roster status: Active

Personal information
- Born: September 14, 2004 (age 22); Dallas, Texas, U.S.
- Listed height: 6 ft 0 in (1.83 m)
- Listed weight: 182 lb (83 kg)

Career information
- High school: South Oak Cliff (Oak Cliff, Texas)
- College: Texas (2023–2025)
- NFL draft: 2026: 4th round, 124th overall pick

Career history
- Chicago Bears (2026–present)

Awards and highlights
- Second-team All-SEC (2025)

Career NFL statistics as of Week 7, 2026
- Tackles: 21
- Sacks: 1.0
- Pass deflections: 5
- Interceptions: 1
- Stats at Pro Football Reference

Malik Muhammad (born September 14, 2004) is an American professional football cornerback for the Chicago Bears of the National Football League (NFL). He played college football for the Texas Longhorns and was selected by the Bears in the fourth round of the 2026 NFL draft.

== Early life ==
Muhammad was born on September 14, 2004, in Dallas, Texas, and grew up in the city's Oak Cliff neighborhood. Muhammad attended South Oak Cliff High School where he had 60 tackles with two interceptions as a senior and 70 tackles and three interceptions with two returned for a touchdown as a junior. He committed to the University of Texas at Austin to play college football.

== College career ==
Muhammad earned extensive playing time as a true freshman at Texas in 2023. He appeared in all 14 games and started two games. He scored his first career touchdown recovering a blocked punt against Oklahoma in the Red River Rivalry. He recorded his first career interception against Texas Tech.

Before the 2024 season, he was named to the preseason All-SEC second team. As a sophomore, Muhammad started in all 16 games, logging 36 tackles and eight pass deflections throughout the season.

Before the 2025 season, Muhammad was named to the preseason All-SEC second team and Jim Thorpe Award watchlist. Muhammad missed the game in Week 6 against Florida due to an undisclosed injury. In the Red River Rivalry against Oklahoma, Muhammad recorded two interceptions, a tackle for loss, and a pass breakup, earning SEC Defensive Player of the Week. At the end of the season, Muhammad was named to the All-SEC second team.

On December 22, he declared for the NFL draft, forgoing his final year of eligibility.

=== College statistics ===
Season	Team	GP	Tackles					Interceptions				Fumbles			
Season	Team	GP	Solo	Ast	Cmb	TfL	Sck	Int	Yds	TD	PD	FR	Yds	TD	FF
2023	Texas	14	21	10	31	0	0.0	1	0	0	4	0	0	0	0
2024	Texas	16	32	4	36	1.0	0.0	0	0	0	8	0	0	0	0
2025	Texas	11	23	7	30	2.5	1.0	2	0	0	4	0	0	0	0
Career		41	76	21	97	3.5	1.0	3	0	0	16	0	0	0	0

== Professional career ==
Pre-draft measurables
Height	Weight	Arm length	Hand span	Wingspan	40-yard dash	10-yard split	20-yard split	20-yard shuttle	Three-cone drill	Vertical jump	Broad jump
6 ft 0 in (1.83 m)	182 lb (83 kg)	32 3/8 in (0.82 m)	9 7/8 in (0.25 m)	6 ft 5 1/4 in (1.96 m)	4.42 s	1.51 s	2.56 s	4.19 s	6.95 s	39 in (0.99 m)	10 ft 10 in (3.30 m)
All values from NFL Combine/Pro Day

Muhammad was selected in the fourth round of the 2026 NFL draft with the 124th overall pick by the Chicago Bears. Muhammad signed his four-year rookie contract worth $5.48 million. He signed his rookie contract on May 8.

Muhammad made his NFL debut in Week 1 as a starting cornerback against the Carolina Panthers, making one interception, two pass deflections, and three tackles.
