= Shaun Alexander Freshman of the Year Award =

College football award

- Awarded for: College freshman player of the year
- Country: United States
- Presented by: FWAA (2018–2020); Maxwell Football Club (2021–present)

History
- First award: 2018
- Most recent: QB Julian Sayin, Ohio State
- Website: shaunalexander.com/the-shaun-alexander-award/

The Shaun Alexander Freshman of the Year Award is presented annually to the best freshman player of the year in college football . The award is named for Shaun Alexander, a former college and professional American football player. It was initially created by the FWAA and later taken over by the Maxwell Club. Voters for the Maxwell College Awards are NCAA head college football coaches, members of the Maxwell Football Club, and sportswriters and sportscasters from across the country. The Maxwell Club is located in Philadelphia, Pennsylvania and the presentations are held in Atlantic City, New Jersey. Club members are given voting privileges for the award.

== Winners ==
| Year | Player | Position | School | Ref |
|---|---|---|---|---|
| 2018 | Trevor Lawrence | QB | Clemson | |
| 2019 | Kenneth Gainwell | RB | Memphis | |
| 2020 | Will Anderson Jr. | LB | Alabama | |
| 2021 | Brock Bowers | TE | Georgia | |
| 2022 | Drake Maye | QB | North Carolina | |
| 2023 | Caleb Downs | S | Alabama | |
| 2024 | Colin Simmons | DE | Texas | |
| 2025 | Julian Sayin | QB | Ohio State | |
