= Brad Spence (American football) =

American football player (born 2005)

No. 14 – Texas Longhorns
- Position: Defensive end
- Class: Senior

Personal information
- Born: May 8, 2005 (age 21)
- Listed height: 6 ft 2 in (1.88 m)
- Listed weight: 242 lb (110 kg)

Career information
- High school: Klein Forest (Houston, Texas)
- College: Arkansas (2023–2024); Texas (2025–present)
- Stats at ESPN

Brad Spence (born May 8, 2005) is an American football defensive end for the Texas Longhorns. He previously played for the Arkansas Razorbacks.

== Early life ==
Spence attended Klein Forest High School in Houston Texas. As a junior, he posted 72 tackles with 11 being for a loss, a sack, six pass deflections, and a fumble recovery. Coming out of high school, Spence was rated as a three-star recruit by 247Sports, and committed to play college football for the Arkansas Razorbacks over offers from other schools such as California, Texas, Kansas, Louisville, Nebraska, and Wisconsin.

== College career ==
=== Arkansas ===
Spence entered his freshman season in 2023 vying for playing time on the Razorbacks defense. In the season opener, he intercepted a pass which he returned 85 yards for a touchdown against Western Carolina. Spence finished the 2023 season with 16 tackles with one and a half going for a loss, an interception, and a touchdown. In 2024, he played in all 12 games with four starts, totaling 54 tackles and four and a half sacks. After the conclusion of the season, Spence entered the NCAA transfer portal.

=== Texas ===
Spence transferred to play for the Texas Longhorns. Heading into the 2025 season, he switched from playing linebacker to defensive end for the Longhorns. Spence finished the 2025 season with 21 tackles with six going for a loss, and three sacks.

=== College statistics ===
Year	Team	GP	Tackles					Interceptions					Fumbles			
Year	Team	GP	Solo	Ast	Cmb	TfL	Sck	Int	Yds	Avg	TD	PD	FR	Yds	TD	FF
2023	Arkansas	11	7	8	16	1.5	0.0	1	85	85.0	1	0	1	0	0	0
2024	Arkansas	12	26	28	54	6.0	4.5	0	0	0.0	0	0	0	0	0	0
2025	Texas	12	12	9	21	6.0	3.0	0	0	0.0	0	0	0	0	0	0
Career		35	45	46	91	13.5	7.5	1	85	85.0	1	1	1	0	0	0
