= Pleasant Grove High School (Texas) =

Public high school in Texarkana, Texas, United States

Location
- 5406 McKnight Rd; Texarkana, Bowie, Texas 75503; United States; 33.466689°N 94.109470°W

Information
- Type: Public high school
- School district: Pleasant Grove ISD
- Superintendent: Chad Pirtle
- NCES School ID: 483513006031
- Principal: Natalie Reeves
- Faculty: 68.26 (on an FTE basis)
- Grades: 9‍–‍12
- Enrollment: 753 (2023‍–‍2024)
- Student to teacher ratio: 11.03
- Colors: Black and gold
- Athletics conference: 4A Div II
- Team name: Hawks
- Rivals: Liberty-Eylau, Gilmer, Carthage
- Website: Official website

Pleasant Grove High School is a public high school located in Texarkana, Texas. It is the sole high school in the Pleasant Grove Independent School District and is classified as a 4A school by the University Interscholastic League. During 2023‍–‍2024, Pleasant Grove High School had an enrollment of 753 students and a student to teacher ratio of 11.03. The school received an overall rating of "A" from the Texas Education Agency for the 2024‍–‍2025 school year.

== Athletics ==
The Pleasant Grove Hawks compete in the following sports:

- Baseball
- Basketball
- Cross Country
- Football
- Golf
- Soccer
- Softball
- Tennis
- Track and Field
- Volleyball

=== State Titles ===
- Baseball
  - 2010(3A), 2012(3A), 2021(4A), 2026(4A/D1)
- Cheerleading
  - 2017(4A)
- Football
  - 2017(4A/D2), 2019(4A/D2)

== Notable alumni ==
- Landon Jackson, NFL defensive end for the Buffalo Bills
- Lance Jackson, college football defensive end for the Texas Longhorns
- Nick Martin, professional football player for the San Francisco 49ers
