= DJ Campbell (offensive lineman) =

American football player (born 2003)

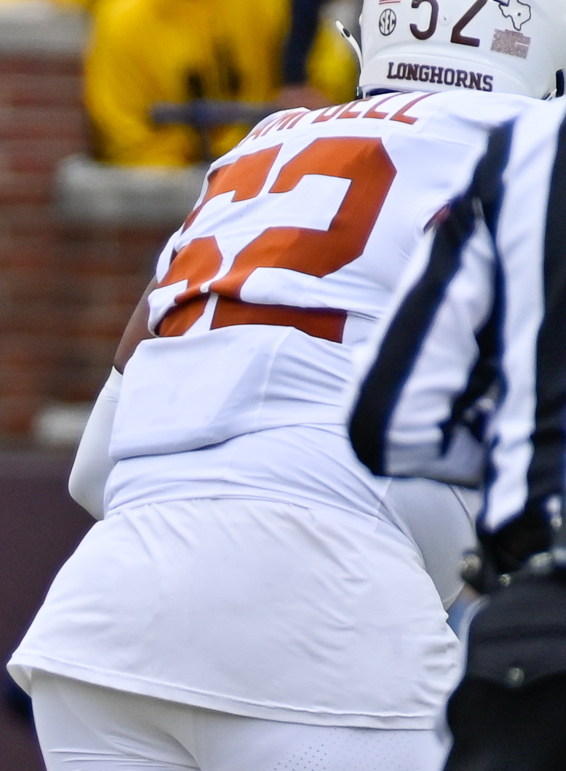
- Campbell in 2024

No. 63 – Miami Dolphins
- Position: Guard
- Roster status: Practice squad

Personal information
- Born: September 24, 2003 (age 23)
- Listed height: 6 ft 3 in (1.91 m)
- Listed weight: 313 lb (142 kg)

Career information
- High school: Bowie (TX)
- College: Texas (2022–2025)
- NFL draft: 2026: 6th round, 200th overall pick

Career history
- Miami Dolphins (2026–present)

Awards and highlights
- Third-team All-SEC (2025)
- Stats at Pro Football Reference

Devon "DJ" Campbell (born September 24, 2003) is an American professional football offensive guard for the Miami Dolphins of the National Football League (NFL). He played college football for the Texas Longhorns and was selected by the Dolphins in the sixth round of the 2026 NFL draft.

== Early life ==
Campbell played high school football at Bowie High School in Arlington, Texas. He was rated by ESPN as the No. 10 football recruit in the 2022 recruiting class. He was a five-star recruit and held over 25 offers from schools such as Alabama, Georgia, Texas, LSU, and others.

In February 2022, Campbell signed his letter of commitment to play college football for Texas.

== College career ==
In his freshman year, Campbell appeared in seven games.

In his sophomore year, Campbell played in all 14 games as the starting right guard.

In his junior year, Campbell started all 16 games and was part of the offensive line that was named a Joe Moore Award finalist. At the end of the season, Campbell decided to opt out of the NFL draft and return for his senior year as the only returning starter from the 2024 offensive line.

In his senior year, Campbell started all 12 games. At the end of the season, he was named to the All-SEC third team. On January 4, 2026, Campbell declared for the NFL draft.

== Professional career ==
Pre-draft measurables
Height	Weight	Arm length	Hand span	Wingspan	40-yard dash	10-yard split	20-yard split	20-yard shuttle	Vertical jump	Broad jump	Bench press
6 ft 3 in (1.91 m)	313 lb (142 kg)	34 1/4 in (0.87 m)	10 1/4 in (0.26 m)	6 ft 10 1/8 in (2.09 m)	5.01 s	1.76 s	2.93 s	4.78 s	26.5 in (0.67 m)	8 ft 8 in (2.64 m)	20 reps
All values from NFL Combine/Pro Day

Campbell was selected by the Miami Dolphins with the 200th overall pick in the sixth round of the 2026 NFL draft. He signed his four-year rookie contract worth $4.65 million. On October 28, Campbell was waived after the Dolphins claimed guard Christian Haynes off waivers. After clearing waivers, he was signed to the Dolphins practice squad.

== Personal life ==
Campbell's parents are Candace Porter (mother) and Renaldo Campbell (father).
