= Cole Brevard =

American football player (born 2001)

No. 69 – Seattle Seahawks
- Position: Defensive tackle
- Roster status: Practice squad

Personal information
- Born: November 6, 2001 (age 25)
- Listed height: 6 ft 3 in (1.91 m)
- Listed weight: 346 lb (157 kg)

Career information
- High school: Carmel (Carmel, Indiana)
- College: Penn State (2020–2021); Purdue (2022–2024); Texas (2025)
- NFL draft: 2026: undrafted

Career history
- Kansas City Chiefs (2026)*; Seattle Seahawks (2026–present)*
- * Offseason or practice squad member only
- Stats at Pro Football Reference

Cole B. Brevard (born November 6, 2001) is an American football defensive tackle for the Seattle Seahawks of the National Football League (NFL). He played college football for the Penn State Nittany Lions, Purdue Boilermakers, and Texas Longhorns.

== Early life ==
Brevard attended Brebeuf Jesuit Preparatory School for his freshman season, before transferring to Carmel High School in Carmel, Indiana. Coming out of high school, he was rated as a four-star recruit by ESPN, and committed to play college football for the Penn State Nittany Lions over offers from other schools such as Clemson, Florida State, Iowa, Michigan, Michigan State, Notre Dame, Ohio State, Oregon, Tennessee, and Wisconsin.

== College career ==
=== Penn State ===
During his two seasons as a Nittany Lion from 2020 to 2021, he took a redshirt, while only playing in one game, before entering the NCAA transfer portal after the 2021 season.

=== Purdue ===
Brevard transferred to play for the Purdue Boilermakers. During his three-year career at Purdue from 2022 to 2024, he totaled 38 tackles with nine being for a loss, two and a half sacks, and two fumble recoveries. After the 2024 season, Brevard once again entered the NCAA transfer portal.

=== Texas ===
Brevard transferred to play for the Texas Longhorns. In the 2025 season opener, he notched two tackles in a loss to Ohio State. Brevard finished the season with 18 tackles and two pass deflections.

== Professional career ==
Pre-draft measurables
Height	Weight	Arm length	Hand span	Wingspan	40-yard dash	10-yard split	20-yard split	20-yard shuttle	Three-cone drill	Vertical jump	Broad jump	Bench press
6 ft 2 3/4 in (1.90 m)	343 lb (156 kg)	32 1/8 in (0.82 m)	9 3/8 in (0.24 m)	6 ft 7 1/8 in (2.01 m)	5.14 s	1.70 s	2.82 s	5.06 s	8.60 s	25.5 in (0.65 m)	8 ft 11 in (2.72 m)	27 reps
All values from Pro Day

=== Kansas City Chiefs ===
After not being selected in the 2026 NFL draft, Brevard signed with the Kansas City Chiefs as an undrafted free agent. He signed a three-year contract worth $3.11 million. On August 30, 2026, Brevard was waived by the Chiefs as a part of final roster cuts; he was re-signed to the team's practice squad the following day. On September 2, the Chiefs released Brevard from their practice squad.

=== Seattle Seahawks ===
On November 10, 2026, Brevard was signed to the Seattle Seahawks' practice squad.
