= Jaime Ffrench Jr. =

American football player (born 2006)

No. 10 – Michigan Wolverines
- Position: Wide receiver
- Class: Sophomore

Personal information
- Born: July 11, 2006 (age 20)
- Listed height: 6 ft 2 in (1.88 m)
- Listed weight: 185 lb (84 kg)

Career information
- High school: Mandarin (Jacksonville, Florida)
- College: Texas (2025); Michigan (2026–present)
- Stats at ESPN

Jaime Ffrench Jr. (born July 11, 2006) is an American football wide receiver for the Michigan Wolverines. He previously played for the Texas Longhorns.

== Early life ==
Ffrench Jr. attended Mandarin High School in Jacksonville, Florida. He was rated as a five-star recruit, the five overall wide receiver, and the 31st overall player in the class of 2025, and committed to play college football for the Alabama Crimson Tide. However, Ffrench Jr. de-committed from the Crimson Tide after head coach, Nick Saban retired, opening up his recruitment to schools such as Georgia, Ohio State, and Michigan. Ultimately, he signed to play for the Texas Longhorns.

== College career ==
In 2025 season, Ffrench Jr. played in four games for Texas, catching one pass for six yards. After the conclusion of the season, he entered the NCAA transfer portal.

Ffrench Jr. transferred to play for the Michigan Wolverines.

== Personal life ==
Ffrench Jr. is the brother of former NFL wide receiver, Maurice Ffrench, and Campbell defensive back, James Tarver.
