= Manchester High School (Georgia) =

Public high school in Manchester, Georgia, United States

Location
- 405 North 5th Avenue; Manchester, Georgia 31816; United States; 32°51′33″N 84°37′09″W

Information
- School type: Public
- School district: Meriwether County School District
- Principal: Dr Melanie Smith
- Teaching staff: 30.70 (FTE)
- Grades: 9–12
- Enrollment: 447 (2024–2025)
- Student to teacher ratio: 14.56
- Colors: Blue and white
- Nickname: Blue Devils
- Website: mhs.mcssga.org

Manchester High School is a public high school in Manchester, Georgia, United States, serving grades 9–12 for the Meriwether County School District. It was established in 1928.

== Notable alumni ==
- Bill Mathis (1950), football player who played for the New York Jets
- Antabia Waller (2006), basketball player who plays professionally in Montenegro
- Justus Terry (2025), college football defensive lineman for the Texas Longhorns
