= Guyton (surname) =

Guyton is a town in the US state of Georgia.

Guyton is also a surname. Notable people with this surname include:

- A. J. Guyton (born 1978), American basketball player
- Arthur Guyton (1919–2003), American physiologist
- Billy Guyton (born 1990), New Zealand rugby union player
- Boone Guyton (1913–1996), American test pilot and aviation executive
- Carlton Guyton (born 1990), American basketball player
- David Edgar Guyton )199-1964, American educator, journalist, poet, and banker
- Emma Jane Guyton (1825–1887), English novelist and editor
- Gary Guyton (born 1985), American football linebacker
- Jalen Guyton (born 1997), American football wide receiver
- Joseph William Guyton (1889–1918), first American soldier killed on German-held soil in World War I
- LaDamion Guyton, American football player
- Louis-Bernard Guyton de Morveau (1737–1816), French chemist and politician
- Mickey Guyton (born 1983), American country music singer
- Michele Guyton (born 1966), American politician
- Myron Guyton (born 1967), American football defensive back
- Scott Guyton (born 1976), New Zealand cyclist and sports director
- Trevor Guyton (born 1990), American football defensive tackle
- Tyree Guyton (born 1955), American artist
- Wade Guyton (born 1972), American artist
- Wanda Guyton (born 1965), American basketball coach and player
- William Guyton (1816–1884), New Zealand politician

== See also ==
- Gyton Grantley, Australian actor
