= 2026 college football recruiting class =

Recruiting of students for US college football

The college football recruiting class of 2026 refers to high school athletes recruited to play college football in the fall of 2026. The scope of this article covers: (a) the colleges and universities with recruiting classes ranking among the top 25 in the country as assessed by at least one of the major media outlets, and (b) the individual recruits ranking among the top 20 in the country as assessed by at least one of the major media outlets: 247Sports, ESPN, On3 and Rivals.

== Top ranked classes ==
Each of the schools listed below were ranked within the top 25 recruiting classes by at least one major recruiting site. They are listed in order of their highest ranking by any of the major media outlets. Rankings may change, and the rankings reflected below are current as of September 4, 2025.

| School | 247 | Rivals/On3 |
|---|---|---|
| Georgia | 6 | 5 |
| USC | 1 | 1 |
| Notre Dame | 4 | 2 |
| Texas A&M | 9 | 8 |
| Texas | 8 | 10 |
| Oregon | 3 | 3 |
| Alabama | 2 | 4 |
| Tennessee | 7 | 7 |
| Ohio State | 5 | 6 |
| Michigan | 11 | 12 |
| LSU | 13 | 11 |
| Miami (FL) | 10 | 9 |
| Florida | 16 | 13 |
| Florida State | 14 | 14 |
| Clemson | 19 | 19 |
| North Carolina | 17 | 18 |
| South Carolina | 20 | 15 |
| Washington | 12 | 16 |
| Oklahoma | 15 | 17 |
| SMU | 25 | 24 |
| BYU | 21 | 25 |
| Illinois | 23 | 22 |
| Texas Tech | 18 | 20 |
| Ole Miss | 22 | 23 |
| Virginia Tech | 24 | 27 |

== Top ranked recruits ==
The following individuals were ranked by at least one of the major media outlets among the top 20 players in the country in the class of 2026. They are listed in order of their highest ranking by any of the major media outlets. Rankings may change, and the rankings reflected below are current as of December 29, 2025.

| Player | Position | School | ESPN | 247Sports | Rivals/On3 |
|---|---|---|---|---|---|
| Lamar Brown | Defensive tackle | LSU | 1 | 4 | 10 |
| Jackson Cantwell | Offensive tackle | Miami (FL) | 3 | 7 | 3 |
| Keisean Henderson | Quarterback | Houston | 4 | 1 | 4 |
| Jared Curtis | Quarterback | Vanderbilt | 5 | 3 | 2 |
| Zion Elee | Defensive end | Maryland | 2 | 9 | 6 |
| Faizon Brandon | Quarterback | Tennessee | 9 | 2 | NR |
| Kelvin Obot | Offensive tackle | Utah | NR | NR | 5 |
| Luke Wafle | Defensive end | USC | NR | NR | 1 |
| Keenyi Pepe | Offensive tackle | USC | 19 | 5 | NR |
| Carter Meadows | Defensive end | Michigan | NR | 6 | 6 |
| Dia Bell | Quarterback | Texas | 6 | NR | NR |
| Chris Henry Jr. | Wide receiver | Ohio State | 7 | 32 | 31 |
| Rodney Dunham | Defensive end | Notre Dame | NR | 8 | 10 |
| Richard Wesley | Defensive end | Texas | 8 | NR | 17 |
| Savion Hiter | Running back | Michigan | NR | 18 | 8 |
| Grayson McKeogh | Offensive tackle | Notre Dame | NR | NR | 9 |
| Tristen Keys | Wide receiver | Tennessee | 10 | 10 | NR |
| Derrek Cooper | Running back | Texas | 11 | NR | NR |
| Felix Ojo | Offensive tackle | Texas Tech | NR | 11 | NR |
| Khary Wilder | Defensive end | Ohio State | 81 | 78 | 22 |
| Richard Anderson | Defensive tackle | LSU | NR | 12 | 18 |
| JaReylan McCoy | Defensive end | Florida | 12 | NR | NR |
| Jay Timmons | Cornerback | Ohio State | 45 | 45 | 12 |
| LaDamion Guyton | Linebacker | Texas Tech | 13 | 15 | NR |
| Xavier Griffin | Linebacker | Alabama | NR | 13 | NR |
| Darius Gray | Offensive line | South Carolina | NR | 14 | NR |
| Kendre' Harrison | Tight end | Oregon | 14 | NR | NR |
| Ekene Ogboko | Offensive tackle | Georgia | NR | NR | 14 |
| Immanuel Iheanacho | Offensive tackle | Oregon | 15 | NR | NR |
| Jermaine Bishop | Athlete | Texas | NR | 16 | NR |
| Jireh Edwards | Safety | Alabama | 16 | NR | NR |
| Jalen Lot | Wide receiver | Oregon | NR | NR | 16 |
| Tyler Atkinson | Linebacker | Texas | 17 | NR | NR |
| Jorden Edmonds | Cornerback | Alabama | NR | 17 | NR |
| Brandon Arrington | Athlete | Texas A&M | 18 | NR | NR |
| Ezavier Crowell | Running back | Alabama | NR | NR | 19 |
| Anthony Jones | Linebacker | Oregon | NR | 19 | NR |
| Kodi Greene | Offensive tackle | Washington | NR | 20 | NR |
| Jase Mathews | Wide receiver | Ole Miss | NR | NR | 20 |
| Kaiden Prothro | Tight end | Georgia | 20 | NR | NR |
| Jerquaden Guilford | Wide receiver | Ohio State | 76 | 164 | 17 |

NR= Not ranked inside top 20
