= Interstate Athletic Conference =

All-boys high school sports league in the Washington, D.C., area

The Interstate Athletic Conference is an all-boys high school sports league made up of six private high schools in the Washington, D.C., area, competing in twelve varsity sports: baseball, basketball, cross country, football, golf, ice hockey, lacrosse, soccer, swimming and diving, tennis, track and field, and wrestling. The IAC is regarded as one of the most competitive and talent-deep lacrosse leagues in the nation. Some schools in the IAC are co-ed, so they do not have as many boys to participate in athletics as some schools in the MAC and WCAC. For example, Gonzaga College High School (WCAC), has over 900 boys enrolled at the school while Episcopal High School (IAC) only has 435 boys and girls combined. Despite this, the IAC is seen as on par with or surpassing the WCAC and the MAC and more competitive than the PVAC, the other private high school sports conferences in the Washington, D.C. area. The IAC is also known for its academics as it boasts 3 elite boarding schools.

Each year, the conference awards the Founder's Cup to the school that is most successful across all sports.

== Members ==
| School | Location | Colors | Established | Enrollment | Team name | Joined |
|---|---|---|---|---|---|---|
| Bullis School | Potomac, Maryland | | 1930 | 745 | Bulldogs | - |
| Episcopal High School | Alexandria, Virginia | | 1839 | 435 | Maroon | - |
| Georgetown Preparatory School | North Bethesda, Maryland | | 1789 | 490 | Hoyas | - |
| Landon School | Bethesda, Maryland | | 1929 | 670 | Bears | - |
| St. Albans School | Washington, D.C. | | 1909 | 575 | Bulldogs | - |
| St. Stephen's & St. Agnes School | Alexandria, Virginia | | 1924 | 450 | Saints | - |

== Past members ==
| School | Location | Colors | Established | Enrollment | Team name | Joined | Left |
|---|---|---|---|---|---|---|---|
| Sidwell Friends School | Washington, D.C. | | 1883 | 1,150 | Quakers | - | 1999 |
| Saint James School | St. James, Maryland | | 1842 | 235 | Saints | - | 1974 |

== History ==
The IAC was founded in 1938 as the Academic Athletic Association and later named Interstate Academic Conference before becoming the Interstate Athletic Association.

- 1970: Georgetown Prep's football team is banned from the league. This ban lasts 11 years.
- 1990: Sidwell Friends withdraws from league play in football.
- 2004: League Headmasters meet and decide to remove Georgetown Prep's football team, citing the school's larger number of male students and higher football aspirations than the league's other schools. Prep returned to the IAC for football in 2014.
- 2025: Georgetown Prep stops playing St. Stephen's in football after a 46-0 Homecoming shutout by Prep.
- 2026: Georgetown Prep finishes an undeafeated regular season and beats Episcopal 55-48 to win their first basketball championship since 2018.

== Notable athletes and coaches ==
=== Landon School ===
- Sam Anas, hockey
- Darion Atkins, basketball
- Kristian Fletcher, '23, soccer
- Fred Hetzel, basketball
- Maury Povich, basketball
- Danny Rubin, basketball
- Matt Ward, '02, lacrosse (winner of the Tewaaraton trophy)
- Rob Bordley, football, lacrosse, rugby and coach

=== Episcopal High School ===
- Danny Coale, '07, football
- Tim Hightower, '04, football
- John McCain, '54, wrestling
- Arinze Onuaku, '05, basketball

=== St. Albans School ===
- Red Auerbach, basketball coach
- Matt Bowman, baseball
- Olin Browne, golf
- Al Gore, Basketball, football
- Jesse Hubbard, '94, lacrosse
- Danny Hultzen, baseball
- Ray Brown, track and field
- Brooks Johnson, athletic director/coach
- Nick Lowery, football
- Lester Lyles, football, basketball
- Jonathan Ogden, '92, football
- Manny Quezada, basketball
- Luke Russert, golf
- Wayne Frederick (footballer), soccer

=== Bullis School ===
- William Nylander, hockey
- Dwayne Haskins, football
- Steve Armas, soccer
- Moise Fokou, football
- Dan Goldie, tennis
- Tanard Jackson, '03, football coach
- Doug Moe, basketball
- Rodney Wallace, soccer
- Quincy Wilson (runner), track
- Connor Shellenberger, Lacrosse
- Erik Reynolds, Basketball

=== Georgetown Preparatory School ===
  - Edmund J. Minihan, Class of 1901, Olympian
  - Catesby Clay, Class of 1943, Horse Racer
  - Chip Jenkins, Class of 1982 – Olympic gold medalist (Athletics, 1992)
  - Brian Cashman, Class of 1985 – General Manager, New York Yankees
  - A. J. Wood, Class of 1991 - Member of the 1996 United States men's national soccer team for the 1996 Summer Olympics
  - Arthur Smith, Class of 2001 – Former head coach of the Atlanta Falcons of the National Football League (2021 - 2024). Offensive coordinator for Pittsburgh Steelers.
  - Nick Noble, Class of 2003, Soccer Player
  - Marcus Mason, Class of 2003 – The all-time leading rusher (5,700 yards) in Maryland high school history. American former professional football player who was a running back in the National Football League (NFL).
  - Roy Hibbert, Class of 2004 – former All-Star NBA player for the Indiana Pacers, Lakers, Hornets, and Nuggets
  - Denny McCarthy, Class of 2011 - PGA tour professional (2015–present)
  - Carsten Vissering, Class of 2015, American bobsledder and former swimmer. He represented the United States at the 2026 Winter Olympics.
  - Matt Mervis, Class of 2016 (born 1998) – Major League baseball player for Miami Marlins
  - Kyonte Hamilton, Class of 2021 – NFL defensive tackle for the Houston Texans
  - Immanuel Iheanacho, Class of 2026 - Top-ranked American Football offensive lineman for Oregon Ducks football

=== St. Stephens and St. Agnes School ===
- Michael Schwimer, baseball

=== Sidwell Friends School (1999 and earlier) ===
- Paul Goldstein, '94, tennis
