= Georgetown Preparatory School =

Jesuit college-preparatory school near Washington, D.C. United States

- Schola Praeparatoria Georgiopolitana
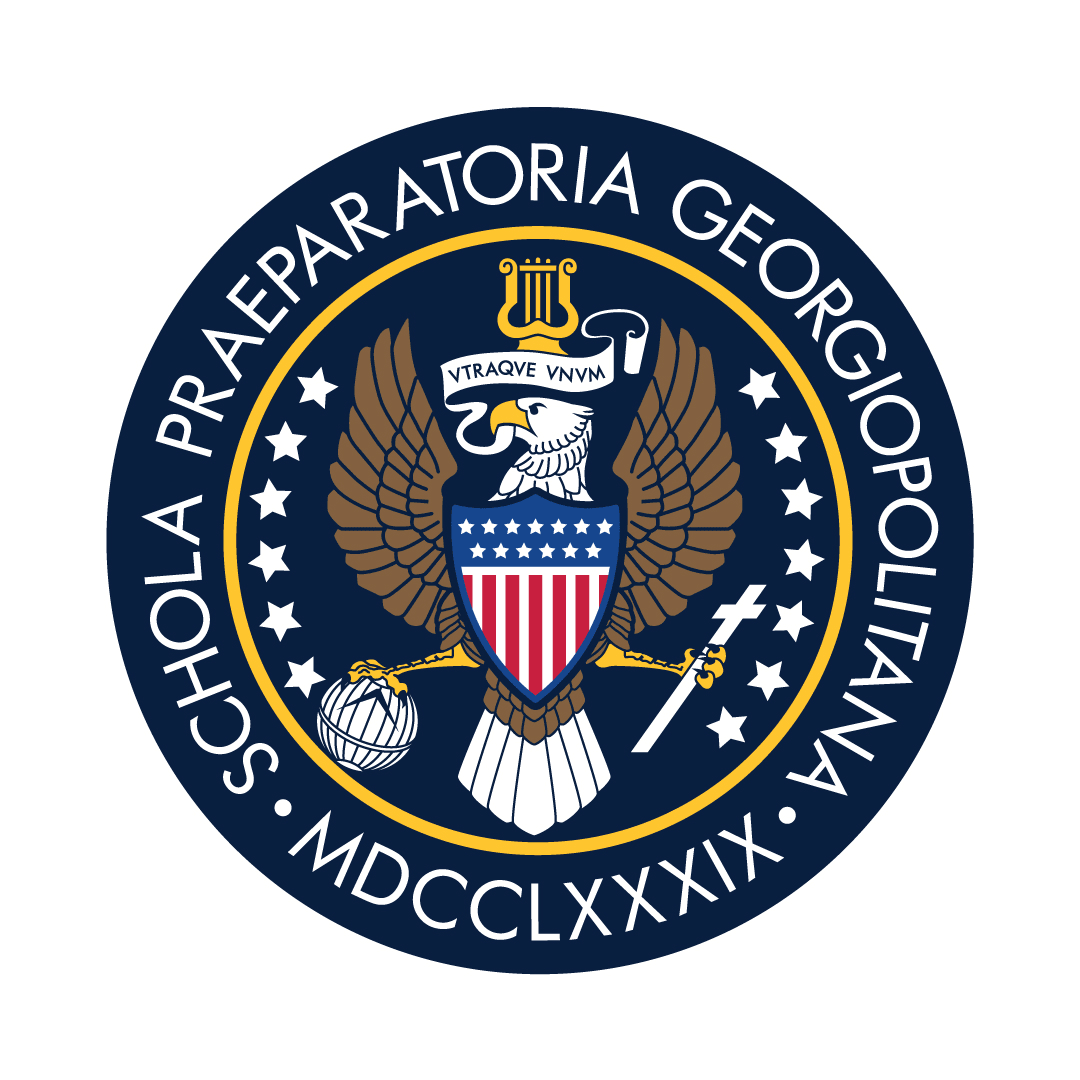

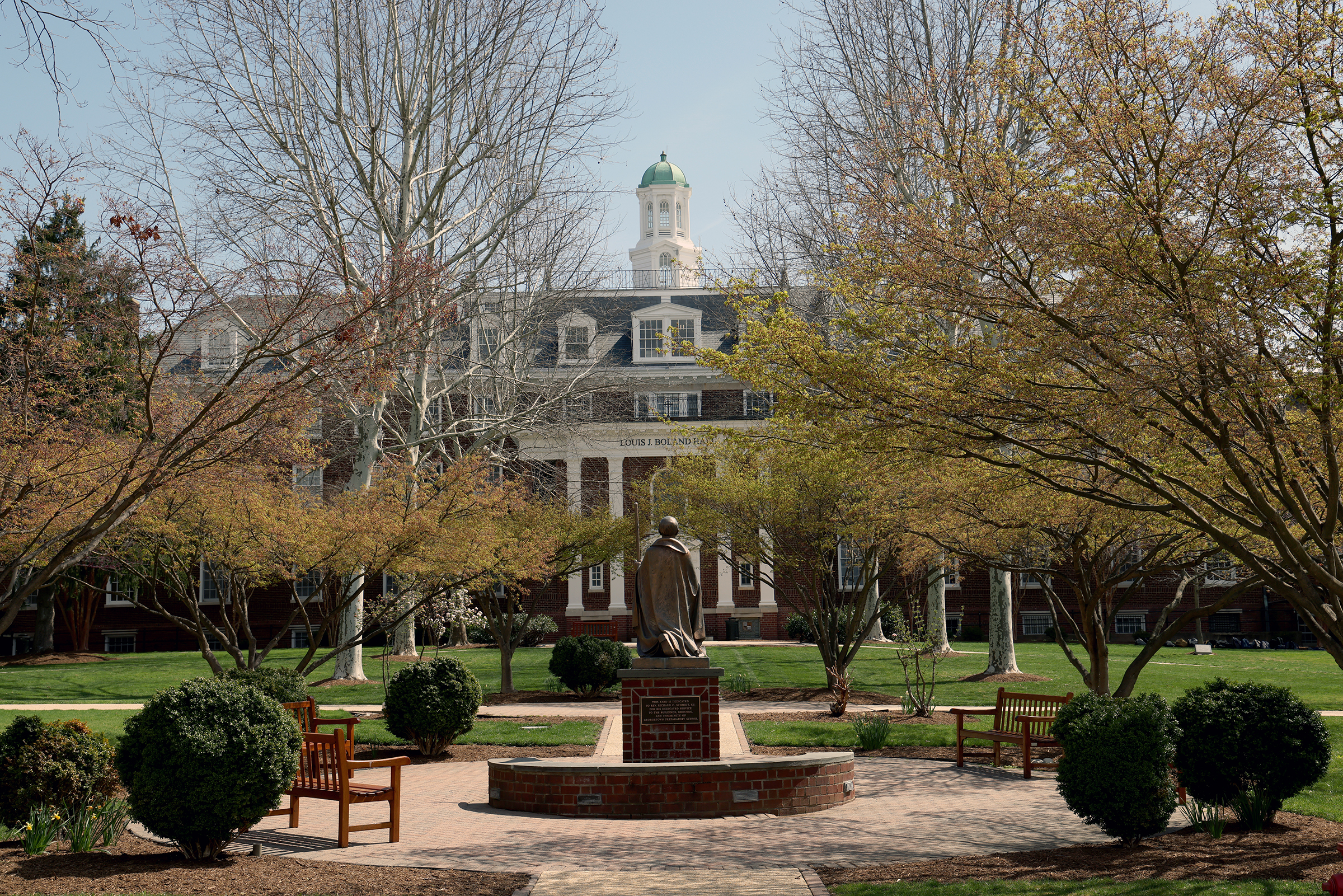
- "The Yard" at Georgetown Preparatory School in April 2022, with the statue of St. Ignatius at center

Location
- 10900 Rockville Pike; Rockville, Montgomery County, Maryland 20852; United States; 39°01′57″N 77°06′34″W

Information
- Type: Private; college-preparatory; day; boarding; Catholic school
- Motto: Hoya Saxa (Let's Rock/What Rocks)
- Religious affiliation: Catholic (Jesuit)
- Established: 1789 (237 years ago)
- Sister school: Various
- CEEB code: 210575
- President: Rev. James R. Van Dyke, S.J.
- Headmaster: John Glennon
- Teaching staff: 57.3 (on an FTE basis)
- Grades: 9–12
- Gender: Boys
- Enrollment: 507 (2022–23)
- International students: 65
- Average class size: 15
- Student to teacher ratio: 8.8∶1
- Campus size: 93 acres (380,000 m^{2})
- Campus type: Large suburban
- Colors: Georgetown Prep Blue & Georgetown Prep Gray
- Slogan: Hoya Saxa
- Athletics: 17 varsity sports
- Athletics conference: Interstate Athletic Conference (IAC)
- Nickname: Hoyas
- Rival: Landon School St. Albans School; Gonzaga College High School Bullis School
- Accreditation: Middle States Association of Colleges and Schools
- National ranking: 1. 6 Best Catholic High School in America; 2. 10 Best All-Boys School in America; 3. 40 Best Boarding School in America; 4. 144 Best Private School in America; 5. 372 Best High Schools for STEM
- Newspaper: Little Hoya
- Yearbook: "Cupola"
- Tuition: Tuition for the 2026-2027 academic year is $47,450(day) $78,015(boarding)
- Feeder schools: Mater Dei
- Affiliation: Society of Jesus; Washington Metro Area Catholic High Schools
- Website: gprep.org
- Last updated: January 17, 2024; 2 years ago

Georgetown Preparatory School (also known as Georgetown Prep, GP, GPrep or The Yard) is a Jesuit college-preparatory school in North Bethesda, Maryland for boys in ninth through twelfth grade. It has a 93-acre (380,000 square meters) campus which are used for student life (as 7 other acres of the golf coursed were leased to an apartment complex on campus). Legally part of Georgetown University until their separation in 1927, Prep is the only Jesuit boarding school in the United States, one of the oldest U.S. boarding schools still operating, and one of the oldest Catholic schools in the nation.

Georgetown Prep has been associated with numerous influential people since its foundation, with George Washington giving an address to its first graduating class. Alumni of the Yard have included numerous businessmen, politicians, senators, representatives, professional athletes, athletic executives, entertainers, medical researchers and professionals, state and federal judges, Kennedy family members, two Supreme Court Justices, and two recipients of the Medal of Honor.

== History ==
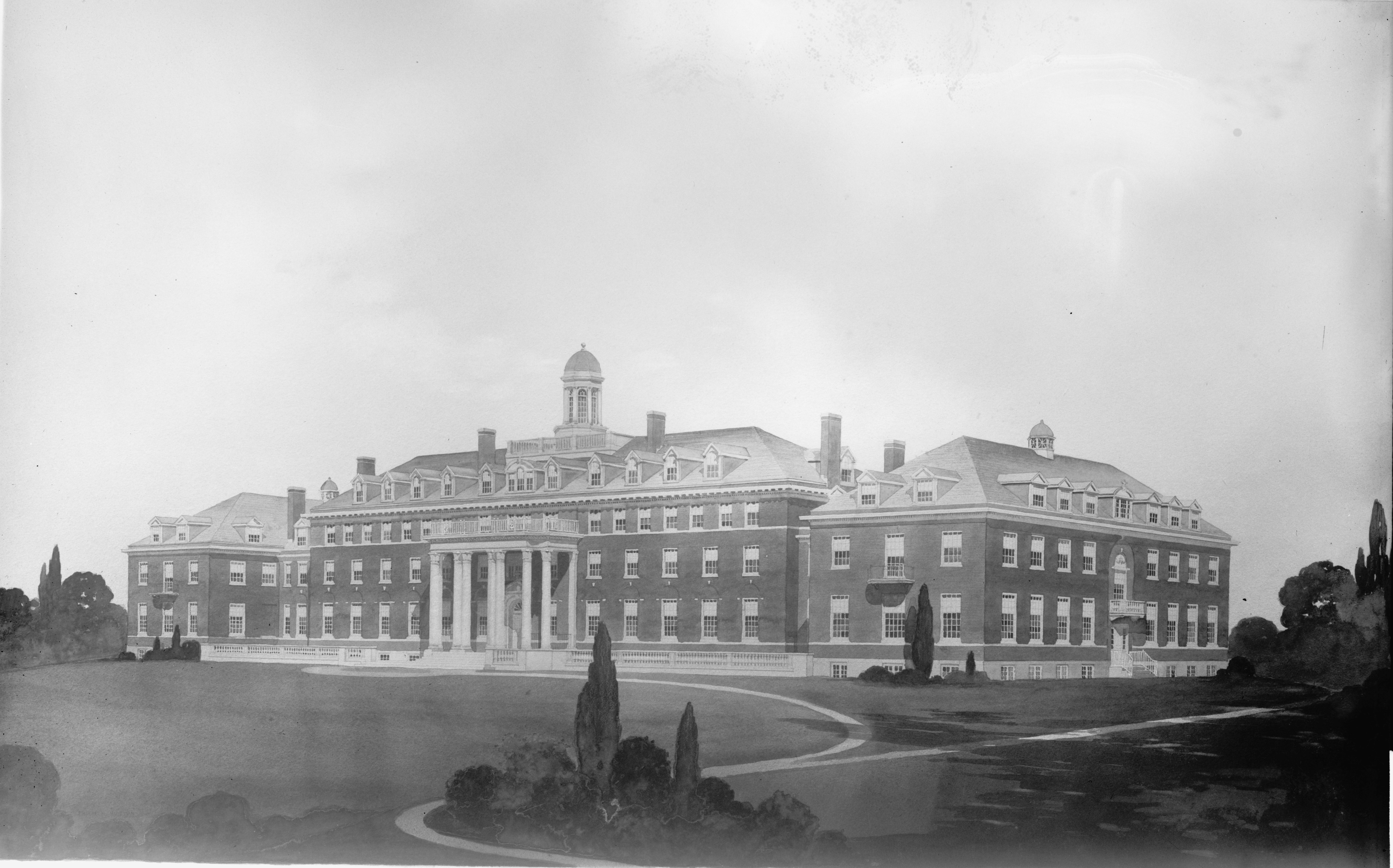
Boland Hall, built 1916–19

Georgetown Preparatory School was founded in 1789 by John Carroll, the first bishop of Baltimore. It is the oldest existing all-boys school in the United States, with George Washington having addressed its inaugural graduating class. In 1919, the school moved from Georgetown University's campus in the District of Columbia to its current location, under the direction of university president Alphonsus J. Donlon. Georgetown Prep remained part of Georgetown University until its legal separation in 1927.

There are approximately 500 students at Prep, with the boarding students comprising 25% of the school's population (2022–23).

In January 2007, the school opened the Hanley Center for Athletic Excellence. Joe Hills, son of golf course architect Arthur Hills, redesigned and reconfigured the school's signature golf course, which reopened in 2008. The field house was converted into a learning center, which was named after the immediate past president Fr. William L. George, S.J., opened for students on January 26, 2010.

The Campus Center and Residence Building opened in October 2022, which incorporates a health center, communal kitchens, student lounges and modern living quarters for the entire resident population and prefects.

=== Founding ===
Fr. Carroll believed the new school—Georgetown Academy soon called Georgetown College—would be vital to the future of the Catholic Church in the United States. He saw it as a place that could inspire young men to become priests while also educating Catholic laypeople who could actively contribute to the political and civic life of the new republic.

The school admitted its first student, 13-year-old William Gaston of New Bern, North Carolina, in late 1791. Classes officially began in January 1792, and by June nearly 40 more students from Maryland, Virginia, New York, and Pennsylvania had enrolled. In April of that year, Georgetown welcomed its first international students, Nicholas and Jean Jacques Février from the French West Indies. From the beginning, the college also opened its doors to students from religious backgrounds other than Roman Catholicism.

By 1815, the Society of Jesus had been restored worldwide, and Georgetown had officially become a Jesuit college. That same year, United States Congress granted the school a charter that was signed into law by James Madison.

During Georgetown College's first century, students in the preparatory program greatly outnumbered those enrolled in the college itself. As a result, the institution functioned largely as a preparatory school with a smaller group of college students. In 1855, the Preparatory Building—later called Maguire Hall—opened as the first campus building specifically intended for preparatory students.

Georgetown College, located in the slave state of Maryland, was also connected to the institution of slavery. The Society of Jesus in the Maryland Province owned enslaved people who worked on Jesuit farms in southern Maryland as well as at the college itself. In 1838, 272 of these enslaved men, women, and children were sold to two sugar planters in Louisiana. Part of the money from that sale was loaned to Georgetown College that same year, helping the institution and its preparatory department avoid severe debt and possible closure. The enslaved people forced into this sale have since been described as a coerced “endowment of tears.” Both Georgetown Preparatory School and Georgetown University have acknowledged this history and have sought reconciliation with the descendants of those enslaved by the Jesuits.

Thirty-five years later, Georgetown College was led by Patrick Francis Healy, S.J., who served as rector-president from 1873 to 1882. Healy was the son of an Irish planter in Georgia and an enslaved woman who was considered his common-law wife, though his African ancestry was not widely known at the time. Decades later, in 1953, Georgetown Preparatory School admitted its first African American student, seventh grader Anthony H. Pierce Jr. In 2007, Jeffrey L. Jones became the school's first African American headmaster, serving until 2015 and also acting as president from 2013 to 2014.

During the American Civil War, enrollment at Georgetown College declined sharply as many students—both from the college and the preparatory department—left to fight for either the Union or the Confederacy. John Early, S.J., who served as rector-president from 1858 to 1866, managed to keep the institution operating. He did so partly by building relationships with two members of Abraham Lincoln's cabinet: Secretary of State William H. Seward and Secretary of War Edwin M. Stanton. In 1861–1862, Union troops occupied the strategically located campus, and it was used as a hospital following the Second Battle of Bull Run and the Battle of Antietam.

A little more than a decade after the war ended, students from Georgetown Visitation Academy presented a blue-and-gray banner to the Georgetown College crew team. The colors symbolized the reunion of the former Union and Confederate states after the war. Blue and gray later became the official colors of both the college and its preparatory department.

In the late nineteenth century, the preparatory department began to develop a stronger identity of its own. The growing popularity of team sports—including baseball, football, track, crew, and, beginning in 1907, basketball—helped build pride and school spirit among preparatory students. By the 1889–1890 academic year, the college published a separate catalogue for what it officially called the “Georgetown Preparatory School.”

== Student Culture ==
The school frames athletics through the Jesuit language of mind, body, and spirit. That matters because Prep does not present sports as separate from education; it describes athletics as part of forming leadership, discipline, humbleness, selflessness and character. The school's Hoya identity is connected to the broader Georgetown tradition of “Hoya Saxa,” a cheer historically associated with Georgetown athletics and commonly translated as “What Rocks!” The phrase helped shape the use of “Hoyas” as a team name within Georgetown athletic culture. Georgetown Prep has a long-standing athletic rivalry with the Landon School, particularly in sports such as lacrosse.

== Athletics ==
The school's athletics department sponsors 33 teams across 17 sports and that the Hoyas won 66 Interstate Athletic Conference championships from 2012 to 2025. Several Prep programs have achieved regional or national prominence.

Georgetown Preparatory School's athletic teams are known as the "Little Hoyas". The lacrosse program, established in 1989, has won multiple IAC titles and was named national champion in 2003 and 2006. Swimming and diving has won 25 consecutive IAC championships, while golf has accumulated 40 league banners and 20 Metro titles. Recent success has also extended to basketball, which won the 2026 IAC championship, and baseball, which won its sixth straight IAC title in 2025.

=== Lacrosse ===
Georgetown Prep's modern lacrosse program traces its origins to Kevin Giblin, who became the school's first varsity head coach in 1988; the school lists the program as established in 1989. Under Giblin, Prep became one of the Washington area's leading high school lacrosse programs and later a national power. By 1999, Giblin had compiled a 129–42 record and sent more than 30 players to Division I programs. Prep won national championships in 2003 and 2006. The 2003 team went 22–1, won the IAC championship, finished No. 1 nationally, and defeated Landon for the first time in school history. The 2006 team completed a 22–0 season, won the IAC title, defeated Landon 15–3 in the championship game, and finished ranked No. 1 nationally. Giblin recorded his 400th career win in 2013 and resigned in 2014 after 27 years leading the program.

Scott Urick was hired as head coach in 2016. During Urick's tenure, Prep defeated IMG Academy in the first live nationally televised high school lacrosse game in 2017, won the IAC title after an undefeated regular-season conference run in 2019, and won IAC tournament championships in 2021 and 2023. The 2023 team completed a perfect IAC season, defeated Landon for the conference championship, and was ranked No. 6 nationally by USA Lacrosse. In 2025, Georgetown Prep hired Andy Hilgartner, formerly of McDonogh School, as varsity head coach and went onto win the 2026 IAC championship for lacrosse, defeating rival St. Albans 15-6.

=== Swimming and diving ===
Swimming and Diving could be considered the most dominant program in recent history. Prep says swimming and diving is the winningest program in its athletic department, with 25 consecutive IAC championships, the latest in the 2025–2026 season. The page also says the program has produced more than 100 NISCA All-Americans and has had athletes connected to Olympic Trials for over 20 years.

=== Golf ===
the 1924 founding by five students, Frank Emmet's role, the 1933 state title, the 1934 Washington Metropolitan and Maryland Schoolboy championships, the 1966 IAC entry, 40 league banners, 20 Metro titles, six Eastern Interscholastic championships, 32 All-Met selections, four Players of the Year, and Bob Barry's 2026 retirement after 43 years, 28 IAC banners, and 643 wins.

Prep's Hall of Fame page supports the Frank Emmet legacy, saying he arrived in 1927, helped start the team, organized junior tournaments, and was a driving force behind the U.S. Junior Amateur. It also records the 1934 team's Maryland and District titles and second-place Eastern Interscholastic finish.

The 1973–75 run, Gus Coupe's coaching, the one-loss-in-three-years claim, and the older Hall of Fame snapshot of Bob Barry's achievements come from Prep's Hall of Fame. The current Barry totals are better taken from the updated official golf page.

For major individual golfers, Prep's Hall of Fame supports details on Frederick Shreves, Michael Mitchell, and Denny McCarthy; USGA also confirms McCarthy's Georgetown Prep connection and 2010 U.S. Junior Amateur quarterfinalist profile.

Recent seasons are supported by independent and official sources: The Washington Post covered the 2018 Metro title, the 2024 All-Met/Coach of the Year honor for Bob Barry, and the 2025 IAC and Metro championships; Prep's 2026 spring wrap-up confirms the eighth straight IAC title and the medal sweep by Jason Park, Daniel Park, and Jose Viega.

=== Basketball ===
The basketball program won the 2026 IAC championship, completing the first undefeated regular-season title and conference tournament championship in program history. The title was the school's first IAC basketball championship since 2017. The 2025–2026 team was also selected as the No. 1 overall seed in the Maryland Private School State Tournament.

=== Football ===
Georgetown Prep football has won 16 IAC titles during Dan Paro's tenure on the school's football staff. The program recorded a 30-game winning streak from 2000 to 2003, and the 2002 team finished ranked No. 1 in the Washington metropolitan area by The Washington Post. In 2025, Prep offensive lineman Immanuel Iheanacho was named The Washington Post All-Met Offensive Player of the Year, becoming the first lineman to receive the honor since Jonathan Ogden in 1991.

=== William V. Bidwill '49 Stadium ===
Following an $8,000,000 donation from Michael Bidwill, alumnus and owner of the Arizona Cardinals, a new 1,508-seat stadium was constructed on campus. This new stadium was dedicated to Michael's father Bill Bidwill, who had also been the owner of the Cardinals from 1962 until his death in 2019. The stadium's field was jointly dedicated to Coach Jim Fegan and S.J. Aloysius Galvin as the Fegan-Galvin Field. Fegan was the Hoyas' football coach from 1961 to 1996 who had a record of 409 wins, 149 losses, 14 Interstate Athletic Conference titles and nine undefeated seasons until he was replaced by Dan Paro, a 1979 alumnus who is the current coach. Galvin served at the school for 37 years from 1970 to 2007 as a Mathematics teacher and the football team's chaplain. The William V. Bidwill ’49 Stadium became the new home to the Hoyas' Football, Soccer and Lacrosse programs following its dedication and blessing by S.J. James Van Dyke on November 12, 2022. The first game played at the new stadium was a homecoming game later in the afternoon on November 12 against the Hoyas' rivals, the St. Alban Bulldogs, which saw the Hoyas beat the Bulldogs 35 to 14.

== The History of Georgetown Prep Golf ==
Among Georgetown Preparatory School's athletic traditions, few programs reach as far back as golf. The program began in the 1920s, growing alongside the school's own campus course. Prep's golf program has helped shape junior golf in the Washington area, and the team is one of Prep's most historically successful.

=== Origins ===
The roots of Georgetown Prep golf go back to 1924, when five Prep students formed a team to compete against other schools in the Washington, D.C. area. At that point, high school golf was still developing as an organized sport. The modern structures that now define interscholastic competition—conference tournaments, All-Met selections, formalized junior championships, and college recruiting pipelines—were far less established. Prep's early golfers were not just joining a sport; they were helping create a culture around it. This beginning matters because it reflects a recurring theme in Prep athletics: a program often starts with a small group of students and adults who see possibility before the rest of the region catches up. The 1924 team laid the groundwork for what would become one of the school's signature athletic programs. Within a decade, Georgetown Prep golf would move from experiment to powerhouse.

=== Frank Emmet and the Campus Course ===
The single most important figure in the early history of Prep golf was Frank Emmet. Emmet came to Georgetown Prep as a coach in the late 1920s and became central not only to the school's golf program but also to junior golf in the Washington area. He helped develop Prep's golf team, managed the growth of the school's golf course, and played a major role in organizing junior competitions. Emmet's importance went beyond coaching. At a time when there were few structured opportunities for young golfers, he helped create them. He encouraged other schools to form teams, organized tournaments, and became associated with the broader movement to bring boys into competitive golf. His work helped connect Georgetown Prep to the emergence of junior golf as a serious athletic pathway. Prep's own course gave the program a rare advantage. The presence of a nine-hole course on campus made golf a visible, daily part of school life. Many high schools could field teams; very few could say that the sport had a physical home at the heart of campus. For a boarding and day school built around a large campus, the course became more than an athletic facility. It was a training ground, a community space, and a symbol of the sport's unusually deep place in Prep life. Emmet's legacy also lived on through regional golf. The Frank Emmet Schoolboy Championship became one of the Washington area's major junior golf tournaments, and later Prep players would continue to win the event.

=== The First Great Breakthrough: 1933 and 1934 ===
By the early 1930s, the program had become one of the school's strongest athletic forces. In 1933, Georgetown Prep golfers won what the school identifies as its first state championship in any sport. That fact alone gives golf a special place in Prep athletic history. Before later generations built famous teams in football, lacrosse, swimming, baseball, and other sports, golf had already carried the school to statewide achievement. The following year, 1934, became one of the foundational seasons in the program's mythology. Led by Frank Allen, Billy Detweiler, Maury Nee, and other standouts, Georgetown Prep captured major regional titles, including the inaugural Washington Metropolitan Championship and the Maryland Schoolboy Championship. The 1934 team also placed second at the Eastern Interscholastic Championship in Greenwich, Connecticut, showing that Prep's reach extended beyond local competition. That early success established a pattern: Georgetown Prep would not merely be competitive within its immediate league; it would measure itself against the best private-school and junior golf competition available. The 1930s teams gave the program its first golden age and proved that Prep golf could stand among the leading high school golf programs in the Washington area.

=== Building a Regional Power ===
From the 1930s forward, Georgetown Prep golf developed into one of the area's most consistent programs. The school's own history describes the team as "the most successful program among area high schools from the early 1930s onward." That claim is rooted in the program's long accumulation of championships: Washington Metropolitan titles, IAC titles, Eastern Interscholastic titles, individual medals, All-Met selections, and college golfers. This kind of success depends on more than one great class. It requires continuity. Prep golf benefited from a school culture in which the sport was not treated as seasonal filler but as a serious part of the athletic program. The campus course, the connection to local country clubs, and the school's location in the Washington region all helped. But facilities alone do not produce dynasties. The program's strength came from the interaction of facilities, coaching, tradition, and players who inherited high expectations. By the middle of the twentieth century, golf had become part of Prep's larger athletic identity. It was a sport in which the school could realistically expect to compete for championships. That expectation shaped the program for generations.

=== Joining the IAC and the Conference Era ===
Georgetown Prep joined Interstate Athletic Conference golf competition in 1966 and immediately won its first league banner. That entrance into IAC golf gave the program a central stage for its rivalries and annual expectations. The IAC—featuring schools such as Landon, St. Albans, Episcopal, St. Stephen's & St. Agnes, and Bullis—has long been one of the major private-school athletic conferences in the Washington region. In golf, as in other sports, the league gave Prep a familiar set of rivals and a yearly championship standard. The program's IAC record became one of the clearest measures of its dominance. Over time, Prep golfers collected dozens of league banners. The school credits the program with 40 league championships, an extraordinary total for any high school sport. Individual success also followed: dozens of players earned All-IAC honors, many won individual IAC medals, and several became multi-year standouts.The IAC era made Prep golf both a team and individual proving ground. Golf is uniquely balanced between individual performance and team scoring. A player can win a medal and still belong to a team result; a roster can dominate because of depth rather than one superstar. Prep's best teams often reflected that second model. The program became known for having strength down the lineup, with the fifth and sixth players often capable of matching another school's top competitors.

=== The 1973–1975 Run ===
One of the most dominant stretches in program history came from 1973 through 1975. Coached by Gus Coupe, the teams from those three seasons won the IAC and the Metro Championship each year. According to Prep's Hall of Fame account, the team lost only one match across the entire three-year run, later avenging that defeat on the way to winning the Eastern Interscholastic Championship.That period stands as one of the clearest examples of what Prep golf could become at its peak: locally dominant, regionally respected, and deep enough to sustain success across multiple graduating classes. The 1973–75 teams were not a one-season spike. They were a dynasty within the dynasty, a run that linked the early foundations of the program to the modern championship era.

=== The Bob Barry Era ===
If Frank Emmet was the founding architect of Georgetown Prep golf, Bob Barry became its modern steward. Barry took over as head coach in 1984 and guided the program for more than four decades. His tenure became one of the defining coaching careers in Georgetown Prep athletics. Under Barry, Georgetown Prep golf became remarkably consistent. The school credits him with 28 IAC banners, 643 victories since 1984, and multiple All-Met Coach of the Year honors. His final season, 2026, ended with the program's eighth consecutive IAC title, a fitting conclusion to a career built on sustained excellence rather than short-term success. Barry's teams were known for depth and calm. In high school golf, where a few bad holes can change an entire tournament, mental discipline matters as much as ball striking. Barry's program emphasized composure, patience, and team scoring. The result was a culture in which Prep could win even without relying on a single once-in-a-generation player. His career also bridged eras. He coached before the modern recruiting landscape, through the rise of the Washington Post All-Met system as a key regional honor, and into the age of social media, college commitments, and year-round junior golf. Through all of it, Prep remained a golf power.

=== Standout Players and Individual Tradition ===
The program's history includes a long line of individual stars. Some became local legends; others went on to college golf and professional careers. Frederick Shreves III, Class of 1989, was one of the greatest athletes in Prep history and one of the strongest golfers the school produced. A three-sport standout in football, basketball, and golf, Shreves made first-team All-Met all four years in golf and won the Frank Emmet Schoolboy Championship as a senior before continuing his golf career at the University of Virginia. Michael Mitchell, Class of 1997, became one of the most decorated golfers in school history. A four-time All-IAC performer, he won the Washington Metropolitan Preparatory School Championship four times, reached match play at the USGA Junior Championship, won the Eastern Interscholastic by 12 strokes, and earned major junior honors in the Washington golf community. He also played at the University of Virginia and later became one of the few players to win both the Maryland Open and Maryland Amateur. The best-known modern Prep golfer is Denny McCarthy, Class of 2011. At Georgetown Prep, McCarthy was a four-year All-Met player and the Washington Post All-Met Player of the Year in 2010. He won multiple IAC titles, captured the Junior PGA Championship, and competed internationally as part of the U.S. Junior Ryder Cup team. After Prep, he starred at the University of Virginia, became a PGA Tour player, and emerged as one of the most accomplished golfers ever connected to the school. McCarthy's career matters to Prep golf not only because he became a professional. His rise shows how the program could serve as a launching point for elite junior players while still maintaining a team-first high school identity. He represents the highest public level of Prep golf achievement, but he also fits into a longer chain of serious players who moved from the school's course and conference tournaments into college and national competition.

=== The Modern Resurgence: 2018 to 2026 ===
The modern chapter of Georgetown Prep golf has been defined by renewed dominance. In 2018, Prep defeated defending champion Gonzaga to win the Washington Metro golf title at P.B. Dye Golf Club. That victory marked a return to the top after a more difficult prior season and showed the resilience of a young roster that included future leaders. By the early 2020s, the program had entered another championship cycle. Prep won repeated IAC titles and continued producing All-Met players. In 2024, the team won its sixth consecutive IAC championship, and Bob Barry earned Washington Post All-Met Coach of the Year recognition after reaching his 600th win. Players such as Rúa Kimotho and Jason Park helped keep Prep at the top of a highly competitive field that included Gonzaga, Landon, St. Albans, Paul VI, Bishop O’Connell, and other strong programs. The 2025 season strengthened that legacy. Georgetown Prep won its seventh consecutive IAC title, with Liam Chalfant earning the individual championship at P.B. Dye. The team then captured the Washington Metro boys’ golf championship, edging Gonzaga and Landon in a tight finish. Jason Park led Prep with a 1-under-par 71, and all six Hoyas shot 78 or better, showing the lineup depth that has long defined the program. In 2026, Prep extended the IAC streak to eight consecutive championships. The team went undefeated in IAC regular-season play, then swept the individual medals at the league championship, with Jason Park earning gold and Daniel Park and Jose Viega claiming silver medals. For Barry, it was a final championship before retirement. For the program, it was proof that the culture he helped build would remain central to Prep athletics.

== Rivalries ==
- The Landon School (archrival)
- St. Albans School (Washington D.C.)
- Gonzaga College High School (brother school)
- The Bullis School

School rivalries within the sociological landscape of Washington, D.C.-area private schools are almost inseparable from the student experience. Georgetown Prep's active athletic culture, especially its long-running rivalry with Landon and other regional counterparts, makes it one of the clearest examples of this phenomenon.

=== The Landon School ===
The rivalry between Georgetown Preparatory School and The Landon School is one of the most intense athletic rivalries in the Washington-Maryland private-school sports scene, particularly in lacrosse. Unlike the Jesuit-based rivalry between Prep and Gonzaga College High School, the Prep–Landon rivalry developed primarily through athletic competition and geographic proximity. Landon was founded in 1929 in Bethesda, Maryland, as an independent college-preparatory school for boys, emphasizing leadership, character formation, and competitive athletics. Georgetown Prep, founded in 1789 and originally connected to Georgetown University, had already established itself as one of the oldest and most prestigious Catholic preparatory schools in the United States. As suburban Maryland developed during the twentieth century, both schools became prominent educational institutions in the same region, and their athletic teams began competing regularly in local leagues and non-conference matchups. The rivalry intensified particularly during the late twentieth century as both schools emerged as national powers in lacrosse, a sport deeply embedded in the culture of elite East Coast preparatory schools. Landon, known as the Bears, built one of the most dominant high-school lacrosse programs in the country. Under legendary head coach Bill Leahy, who coached at Landon from 1975 to 2013, the Bears developed a dynasty that produced numerous college All-Americans and professional players. Leahy's teams won multiple Interstate Athletic Conference (IAC) championships and established Landon as a national lacrosse powerhouse. During the same period, Georgetown Prep—known as the Little Hoyas—also developed a strong lacrosse tradition and began challenging Landon regularly for regional dominance. As both programs grew stronger, games between the two schools became some of the most anticipated matchups in the Washington metropolitan area.

The Interstate Athletic Conference, which includes Landon, Georgetown Prep, St. Albans School, Bullis School, and St. Stephen's & St. Agnes School, helped formalize the rivalry by placing the two schools in regular competition across multiple sports. Within the conference, Prep–Landon contests became particularly important because both schools frequently competed for conference championships. Lacrosse remained the centerpiece of the rivalry, but competition extended to football, basketball, wrestling, and baseball as well. Because both schools emphasize athletics as part of their educational philosophy, victories against each other often carry symbolic importance for students, alumni, and coaches.

Several memorable moments in the Prep–Landon rivalry have come in lacrosse. Over the decades, games between the two teams have often determined the IAC championship or influenced national rankings. Landon historically dominated many of the early matchups during the peak years of Coach Bill Leahy's tenure, when the Bears were widely considered one of the best high-school lacrosse programs in the country. Georgetown Prep, however, gradually closed the competitive gap in the 2000s and 2010s, finally defeating Landon for the first time in 2003. Each program would go onto start producing elite players who went on to compete at top college programs such as University of Virginia, University of Maryland, and Duke University. When the two teams meet today, the games often feature NCAA Division-I recruits and attract attention from college scouts and national lacrosse media.

The rivalry also carries a cultural dimension within the student bodies of both schools. Because the campuses are located only a few miles apart in Montgomery County, many students grow up playing youth sports against each other before eventually attending different high schools. This familiarity intensifies the competitive atmosphere when the teams meet at the varsity level. Student sections are often energetic and loud, with chants, themed clothing, and coordinated spirit events leading up to rivalry games. For athletes, beating Landon or Prep can represent a defining moment of the season, particularly in lacrosse where both schools view themselves as part of the national prep-school elite.

Notable athletes have emerged from both sides of the rivalry. Landon has produced numerous collegiate and professional lacrosse players, including Joe Walters, one of the most decorated players in program history and a standout at the University of Maryland. Georgetown Prep has also produced high-level collegiate athletes and nationally recognized recruits in lacrosse and other sports. The presence of such talent has helped elevate the rivalry beyond the local level, with national lacrosse publications frequently covering matchups between the two programs.

=== Gonzaga Rivalry History ===
The rivalry between Georgetown Preparatory School and Gonzaga College High School is one of the oldest and most historically significant high-school rivalries in the Washington, D.C. region, stretching back more than a century and reflecting not only athletic competition but also the shared Jesuit heritage of both institutions. Georgetown Prep was founded in 1789 as part of Georgetown University and is considered the oldest Catholic boarding school in the United States, while Gonzaga College High School was founded in 1821 in Washington, D.C., and became one of the most prominent Jesuit day schools in the city. Although both schools share the same Catholic Jesuit educational tradition, their identities developed differently over time: Georgetown Prep evolved as a suburban boarding and day school located in North Bethesda, Maryland, while Gonzaga maintained its identity as a large urban Catholic day school deeply connected to Washington, D.C. This contrast between suburban boarding culture and urban day-school culture contributed to the early competitive spirit between the two institutions and helped shape what would become one of the region's defining school rivalries. The athletic rivalry officially began in 1891 when the two schools played their first football game, marking the start of a series that would become one of the oldest high-school rivalries in the United States. Over the decades, the game became a major event for both communities, drawing students, alumni, and Jesuit clergy. Football quickly emerged as the centerpiece of the rivalry, but the competition also expanded into other sports such as basketball, baseball,soccer, lacrosse, track, and rugby. By the mid-twentieth century, the rivalry had already become a major tradition in the Washington metropolitan area, and games between the two schools were often covered in local newspapers. The competition was intense, but because both schools are run by the Jesuit order—whose educational philosophy emphasizes discipline, intellectual development, and respect—the rivalry was frequently described as competitive yet respectful, with both institutions seeing themselves as “brother schools” rather than enemies.

Throughout the twentieth century the rivalry continued to grow, with both schools building strong athletic programs and producing athletes who went on to compete in college and occasionally at the professional level. By the 1970s and 1980s, Georgetown Prep and Gonzaga were widely considered two of the most competitive private-school athletic programs in the region. However, the annual football matchup unexpectedly stopped after the 1988 season due to scheduling conflicts and changes in league alignments. Although the rivalry never completely disappeared—because the schools still competed against each other in other sports—the absence of the football game meant that an entire generation of students in the 1990s did not experience the most visible symbol of the rivalry. The football series was revived in 2004 with the creation of what became known as the Jesuit Gridiron Classic, an annual game that also serves as a fundraising event for Washington Jesuit Academy, a middle school founded in 2001 to provide educational opportunities for students from low-income communities in Washington, D.C. The revival added a new dimension to the rivalry by linking it to charitable service, a core Jesuit value. The game from 2004 to 2018 raised significant funds for the academy through ticket sales, sponsorships, and alumni donations, turning what had once been purely an athletic competition into an event that also supports Jesuit educational outreach. Historically, Gonzaga has held a slight advantage in the football series, though the games have often been competitive and dramatic.

Many memorable moments have occurred during the rivalry's long history. One of the most famous games came in 2009 when Gonzaga defeated Georgetown Prep 23–20 on a last-second field goal, sending Gonzaga's student section rushing onto the field in celebration and adding another dramatic chapter to the rivalry's history. Another interesting moment in the rivalry involved a unique coaching storyline when brothers Kevin and Don Giblin, who each respectively coached the two schools in Lacrosse, reportedly refusing to speak during rivalry week because of the competitive tension between their lacrosse teams. Over time, the rivalry has also produced numerous standout athletes who went on to play at major college programs and occasionally in professional sports, further elevating the prestige of the annual matchup.

Beyond the field, the rivalry carries deep cultural significance within both school communities. Students often spend weeks preparing for rivalry games through spirit weeks, themed outfits, chants, and student-section traditions that intensify the atmosphere. Alumni from both schools frequently return for rivalry games, making the event a multigenerational tradition that connects current students with decades of graduates. The competition also extends beyond football; lacrosse, basketball, rugby, and other sports between the two schools often draw strong crowds and intense student interest. For example, lacrosse matchups between the schools have produced dramatic overtime finishes and high-level competition between nationally recruited players.

== Controversies ==
In the 1990s, the school expelled four students for participating in a ritual known as "butting", which is the practice of restraining a victim and placing one's bare buttocks on the victim's face. After one of the students' expulsion, his parents filed an injunction to get the school to readmit the student. Their defense was that the ritual was a widespread, longstanding custom, and claimed that hundreds of students had either witnessed or participated in it over their tenure at the school. This lawsuit was eventually rejected.

Garrett Orr, a former priest at Georgetown Prep, was sentenced to five years of probation after sexually abusing two students of the school. Orr taught at Prep from 1989 to 2003. He pleaded guilty to two accounts of sexual abuse, in 1989 of a 14-year-old student, and in 2003 of a 15-year-old student. The first victim did not report the abuse until years later. Police were contacted six months after the 2003 incident was reported to a school counselor. After the 2003 incident, some teachers at school unsuccessfully attempted to get Eric Ruyak expelled on the premise of Ruyak being a "liar". Eric Ruyak claimed to have been "groped" by Orr.

== Notable alumni ==
=== Entertainment, Media, and the Arts ===
- Allen Tate, Class of 1918 (d.) – poet and essayist; U. S. Poet Laureate and Consultant in Poetry to the Library of Congress, 1943–44
- Dylan Baker, Class of 1976 – actor, best known for his role as Dr. Curt Connor in Spider-Man 2 and Spider-Man 3 and acts on television series such as The Americans and Damages
- Mark Judge, Class of 1983 – writer, author of Wasted: Tales of a Gen X Drunk.
- Mo Rocca, Class of 1987 – comedian, correspondent for CBS Sunday Morning, the host and creator of My Grandmother's Ravioli on the Cooking Channel, and also the host of The Henry Ford's Innovation Nation on CBS.
- Roberto Aguirre-Sacasa, Class of 1989, an American playwright, screenwriter, and comic book writer best known for his work for Marvel Comics and for the television series Glee (2011–14), Big Love (2009–11), Riverdale (2017–23), Chilling Adventures of Sabrina (2018–20) and Pretty Little Liars (2022–24). He is CCO of Archie Comics.
- Ian Harding, Class of 2005 – actor, best known for his role as Ezra Fitz in Pretty Little Liars

=== Journalism ===
- Dennis Murphy, Class of 1965 - Four time Emmy Award winning Television journalist featured on NBC's Dateline. Winner of four Emmy Awards.
- Chris Rose (journalist), Class of 1978 - New York Times best seller and Pulitzer Prize winning journalist for the New Orleans Times-Picayune.
- Douglas Kennedy, Class of 1985 – journalist, son of senator Robert Kennedy

=== Athletics ===
- Edmund J. Minihan, Class of 1901, Olympian
- Catesby Clay, Class of 1943, Horse Racer. Former director of Churchill Downs
- Chip Jenkins, Class of 1982 – Olympic gold medalist (Athletics, 1992)
- Brian Cashman, Class of 1985 – General Manager, New York Yankees
- A. J. Wood, Class of 1991 - Member of the 1996 United States men's national soccer team for the 1996 Summer Olympics
- Arthur Smith, Class of 2001 – Former head coach of the Atlanta Falcons of the National Football League (2021 - 2024). Offensive coordinator for Pittsburgh Steelers.
- Nick Noble, Class of 2003, Soccer Player
- Marcus Mason, Class of 2003 – The all-time leading rusher (5,700 yards) in Maryland high school history. American former professional football player who was a running back in the National Football League (NFL).
- Roy Hibbert, Class of 2004 – former All-Star NBA player for the Indiana Pacers, Lakers, Hornets, and Nuggets
- Denny McCarthy, Class of 2011 - PGA tour professional (2015–present)
- Carsten Vissering, Class of 2015, American bobsledder and former swimmer. He represented the United States at the 2026 Winter Olympics.
- Matt Mervis, Class of 2016 (born 1998) – Major League baseball player for Miami Marlins
- Kyonte Hamilton, Class of 2021 – NFL defensive tackle for the Houston Texans
- Immanuel Iheanacho, Class of 2026 - Top-ranked American Football offensive lineman for Oregon Ducks football

=== Politics, Law, and Government ===
- William J. Gaston (1778–1844) – the first student of Georgetown Preparatory School a member of Congress and later of the North Carolina Supreme Court
- John Dingell, Class of 1943 (d.) – former Dean of the U.S. House of Representatives
- Anthony Noel, Class of 1941 (d.) - 5th Earl of Gainsborough
- Thomas Hale Boggs, Jr., Class of 1959 (d.) - Prominent attorney/lobbyist and founder of Patton, Boggs (now Squire Patton Boggs).
- Francis Rooney, Class of 1971 – Congressman
- Robert F. Kennedy Jr., Class of 1972 (attendee) – attorney and Independent Presidential Candidate (2024) and son of senator Robert Kennedy. Secretary of Health and Human Services (February 2025 – Present)
- John P. Schmitz, Class of 1972 - Deputy White House Counsel for President George H. W. Bush.
- Joseph E. Schmitz, Class of 1974. Former Inspector General for the Department of Defense under President George W. Bush and foreign policy advisor to President Donald Trump.
- Chris Dodd, Class of 1962 – lobbyist, lawyer, and Democratic Party politician who served as a United States Senator from Connecticut
- Frank LoBiondo, Class of 1964 – Ambassador to the Vatican. Congressman
- F. Joseph Sensenbrenner Jr., Class of 1966 – 53rd mayor of Madison, Wisconsin, former Deputy Attorney General of Wisconsin
- Germán Vargas Lleras Class of 1980– Former Colombian Vice President.
- Rich Madaleno, Class of 1983 – Maryland state senator
- Brett Kavanaugh, Class of 1983 – Associate Justice of the United States Supreme Court
- Neil Gorsuch, Class of 1985 – Associate Justice of the Supreme Court of the United States
- William Ferguson, Class of 2001 - President of Maryland Senate (2019–present).

=== Business, Finance, and Institutional Leadership ===
- Bill Bidwill, Class of 1949 (d.) – the owner of the Arizona Cardinals NFL football team
- Bernard Saul II, Class of 1950 - Billionaire businessman and founder of Chevy Chase Bank (now Capital One).
- Jerome Powell, Class of 1971 – Federal Reserve Board of Governors (May 2012 – February 2018); Chair of the Federal Reserve (February 2018 – Present)
- Michael Bidwill, Class of 1983 – President and Principal Owner, NFL's Arizona Cardinals
- Paul Haaga, Class of 1966—Businessman, philanthropist and former CEO (acting) of NPR.
- Lee Roberts (finance executive), Class of 1986 - Chancellor of University of North Carolina at Chapel Hill (August 2024 – Present).
- David Chang, Class of 1995 – entrepreneur and restaurateur. Founder of Momofuku.

=== Military Service and National Defense ===
- James M. Cutts, Class of 1852 (d.) - Medal of Honor recipient for gallantry in Battles of the Wilderness, Spotsylvania and Petersburg. Served as a Captain in the Union Army during the American Civil War.
- William Jones Nicholson, Class of 1876 (d.) – Brigadier general in the United States Army, recipient of the Distinguished Service Cross and Silver Star
- Michael J. Daly, Class of 1941 (d.) – Medal of Honor recipient, attended the United States Military Academy (1942–43), served in the United States Army (1942–46)
- Harry D. Train II, Class of 1945, Adm. USN (Ret.), former NATO Supreme Allied Commander (1978-1982)
- Gilmary M. Hostage III, Class of 1973 - USAF (Retired) Four Star General and Commander of Air Combat Command

=== Service, Philanthropy, & Social Impact ===
- Anthony Shriver, Class of 1984 – activist, founder of Best Buddies International
- Mark Kennedy Shriver, Class of 1982 – former politician; CEO of Save the Children Action Network

=== STEM ===
- Gordon Zubrod, Class of 1932 (d.) - Oncologist, Considered to be father of modern chemotherapy

== See also ==
- List of Jesuit sites
