= Danny Rubin (basketball) =

American basketball player (born 1991)

Danny Rubin דני רובין
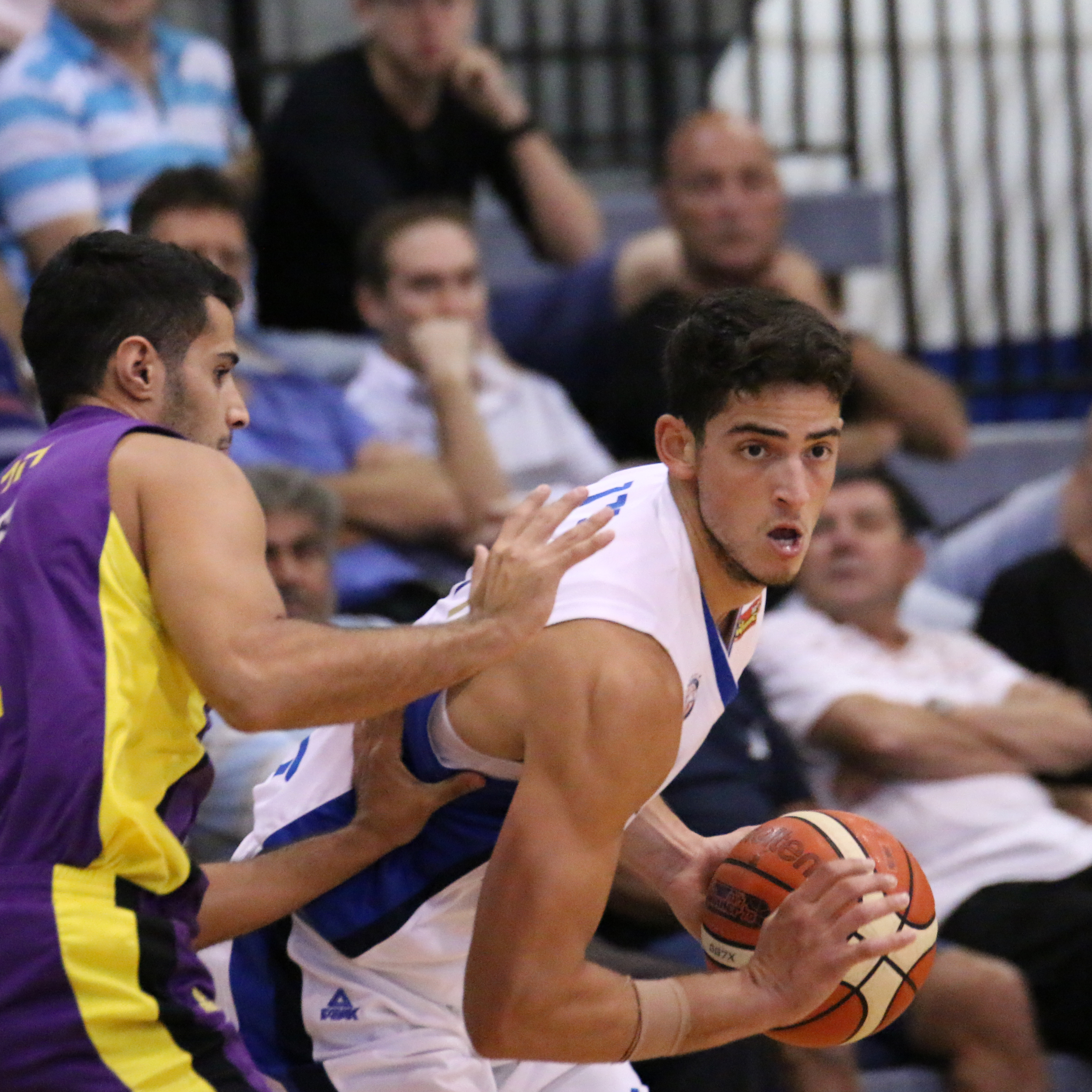

Free agent
- Position: Shooting guard

Personal information
- Born: July 26, 1991 (age 35) Chevy Chase, Maryland
- Listed height: 6 ft 6 in (1.98 m)
- Listed weight: 198 lb (90 kg)

Career information
- High school: Landon School (Bethesda, Maryland)
- College: Boston College (2010–2014)
- NBA draft: 2014: undrafted
- Playing career: 2014–present

Career history
- 2014–2015: Hapoel Kazrin/Galil Elion
- 2015–2017: Bnei Herzliya

Danny Rubin (Hebrew: דני רובין; born July 26, 1991) is an American-Israeli professional basketball player who last played for Bnei Herzliya of the Israeli Basketball Premier League.

He won a gold medal with Team USA in basketball in the 2013 Maccabiah Games, and he played college basketball for Boston College. In 2015, he was named to the Eurobasket.com All-Israeli National League 2nd Team.

== Biography ==
Danny Rubin is Jewish. After graduating from Boston College in 2014, he moved to Israel.

== Sports career ==
In high school, he was selected as a McDonald's All-American nominee, he earned honorable mention All-Met, All-Gazette and All-Montgomery County Sentinel honors as he averaged 18 points a game as a senior at Landon School in 2010, and led them to back to back Interstate Athletic Conference titles.

He played college basketball for Boston College. The Washington Post ran an article of his impressive rise, entitled "Danny Rubin goes from Landon to Boston College walk-on to ACC starter." In July 2013, Rubin represented Team USA in the 2013 Maccabiah Games. Coached by Maccabi Haifa head coach Brad Greenberg, Rubin and his teammates competed in the "open" division of this tournament. He scored 25 points as Team USA beat Team Argentina, 87–76, to win the gold medal.

In 2014, he moved to Israel and joined Hapoel Kazrin/Galil Elion for the 2014–15 season. In 29 games for Kazrin, he averaged 15.1 points, 4.6 rebounds, 1.9 assists and 1.6 steals per game. He was named to the Eurobasket.com All-Israeli National League 2nd Team.

On July 23, 2015, Rubin signed with Bnei Herzliya.
