= Immanuel Iheanacho =

American football player

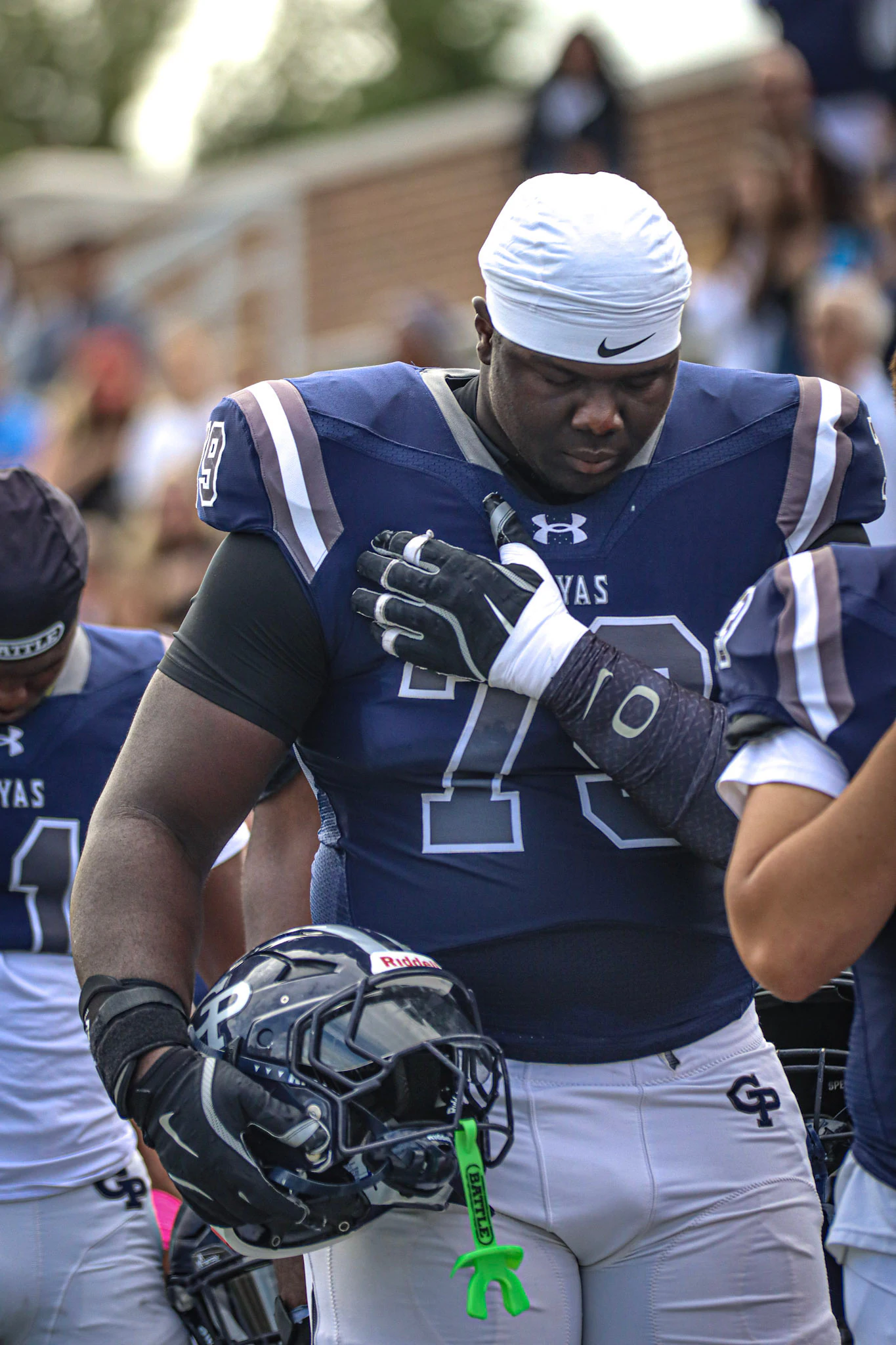

Oregon Ducks
- Position: Offensive lineman
- Class: Freshman

Personal information
- Listed height: 6 ft 6 in (1.98 m)
- Listed weight: 345 lb (156 kg)

Career information
- High school: Georgetown Prep (North Bethesda, Maryland)
- College: Oregon (2026–present)

Immanuel Iheanacho (born November 20, 2007) is an American college football offensive lineman for the Oregon Ducks.

== Early life ==
Iheanacho grew up in Baltimore, Maryland, and began playing basketball after his older brother grew concerned that he was too inactive after school. "It all seemed so foreign, but I fell in love with basketball completely," he said. "I loved everything about it." Iheanacho also played backyard football with his two older brothers and one of their friends. His mother, Vivian, initially resisted allowing him to play organized football due to fear of injuries, especially concussions, but finally acquiesced ahead of his freshman year at the SEED School of Maryland.

== High school career ==
Iheanacho initially struggled learning the sport as a freshman at the SEED School and considered quitting, but remained on the team at the insistence of his coaches. In his sixth game, he recorded his first sack as a defensive lineman. That offseason, at age 14, Iheanacho was measured at 6 ft 6 in (1.98 m) and 325 lb (147 kg), with a 7 ft (2.1 m) wingspan. Ahead of his sophomore year, he transferred to Georgetown Preparatory School in Montgomery County, Maryland, where he played one season of basketball, but decided to focus on football thereafter. At Georgetown Prep, Iheanacho starred on the offensive line while also playing on the defensive line. As a sophomore, he helped the team to an 8–2 record and a share of the Interstate Athletic Conference (IAC) title, and was the lone underclassman to earn Private Schools Division II all-state honors from the Maryland Football Foundation (MFF).

Iheanacho did not allow a single sack at left tackle for the final two years of his dominant high school career, with The Washington Post writing that he "quite literally stood head and shoulders above the competition." As a junior, he was named the IAC Offensive Player of the Year and garnered first-team All-Met accolades from The Washington Post as Georgetown Prep went 7–2 and captured the IAC title outright. Iheanacho was also honored as a consensus all-state selection as well as the Private Schools Division II Player of the Year by the MFF. That offseason, he participated in the Under Armour All-America Game. As a senior, Iheanacho helped his team claim a share of the IAC title. He was named the Washington Post All-Met Offensive Player of the Year, becoming the first lineman to win the award since Jonathan Ogden in 1991. Iheanacho repeated as both a consensus all-state selection and the Private Schools Division II Player of the Year. Additionally, he once again played in the Under Armour All-America Game.

=== Recruiting ===
Iheanacho was rated as a consensus five-star recruit and a consensus top-25 prospect nationally in the class of 2026. He received his first NCAA Division I offer from Marshall the summer after his freshman year, and his first Power Five offer came from Virginia Tech. Iheanacho also earned his five-star rating after his sophomore season, which significantly ramped up his recruitment. After receiving dozens of offers, he narrowed his top choices down to Auburn, LSU, Oregon, and Penn State. Following official visits to each school, Iheanacho verbally committed to playing college football for the Oregon Ducks during a live appearance on The Pat McAfee Show on July 3, 2025. He signed his National Letter of Intent with the Ducks that December, saying: "It has the campus, academics, facilities, city, coaches and players that I was looking for. Oregon is the program I want to be a part of."

== College career ==
Iheanacho is set to enroll early at Oregon in the spring 2026 semester.

== Personal life ==
Iheanacho's parents emigrated to the United States from Nigeria. His mother worked as a registered nurse at a juvenile detention center and his father was a corrections officer in a penitentiary. Iheanacho has a younger brother named Michael who also plays football.
