= Brandon Arrington =

American football player (born 2007)

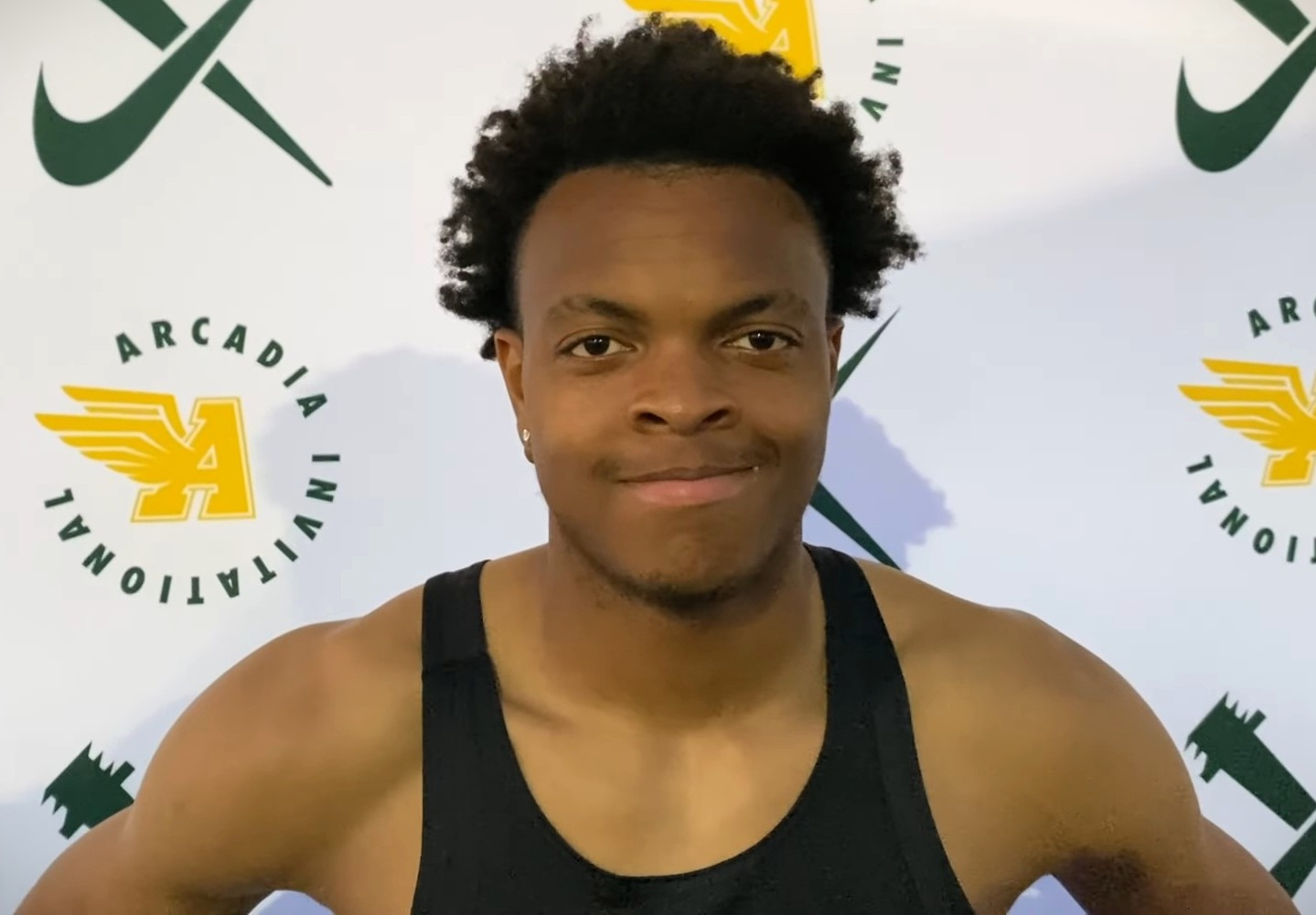
- Arrington in 2025

No. 23 – Texas A&M Aggies
- Position: Cornerback
- Class: Freshman

Personal information
- Born: December 1, 2007 (age 18)
- Listed height: 6 ft 2 in (1.88 m)
- Listed weight: 185 lb (84 kg)

Career information
- High school: Mount Miguel (Spring Valley, California)
- College: Texas A&M (2026–present)

Brandon Arrington (born December 1, 2007) is an American college football cornerback for the Texas A&M Aggies. He played football and ran track in high school, and was named the California Gatorade Track & Field Player of the Year in 2024.

== Early life ==
Arrington was born to Brandon Arrington and Shanail Earls on December 1, 2007, and is a native of San Diego, California. His cousin, Kenan Christon, set the California state record in the 100 meters at Madison High School before going on to play college football at San Diego State, while another cousin, Jalil Tucker, played football at Oregon. Arrington began running track at the age of nine.

== High school career ==
Arrington originally attended Helix High School in La Mesa, California. As a freshman, he was called up to the varsity football team for the final six games of the season and won the state title in the 150 meters at the California Track and Field Winter Outdoor Championships. Arrington caught six touchdown passes and ran back a punt return for a touchdown in two seasons at Helix. He then transferred to Mount Miguel High School midway through the school year in January 2024. As a sophomore at Mount Miguel, Arrington successfully defended his 150 meter state title at the California Winter Outdoor Championships before capturing the state titles in both the 100 meters and 200 meters. He was named the California Gatorade Track & Field Player of the Year.

In two seasons with the Mount Miguel football team, Arrington led the Matadors to a combined record of 17–7 and consecutive appearances in the CIF San Diego Section championship. As a junior, he posted 31 catches for 527 yards and five touchdowns on offense and 26 tackles, an interception, and a fumble recovery on defense. As a senior, Arrington was the starting wide receiver, cornerback, and kick returner, tallying 20 catches for 389 yards and two touchdowns along with 27 tackles. He earned invites to the Navy All-American Bowl and the Polynesian Bowl, as well as the Makasi Bowl, a San Diego vs. Los Angeles all-star game for seniors.

Arrington had a historic junior track season. He set the meet records at the California Winter Outdoor Championships in both the 60 meters (6.67 s) and 150 meters (15.26 s) to sweep both events in February 2025, then broke the San Diego Section records in both the 100 meters (10.24 s) and 200 meters (20.37 s) at the Mt. Carmel Invitational the following month. Arrington achieved the double at the Arcadia Invitational in April as well, with his time in the 200 meters (20.35 s) shattering the meet record of 20.49 s previously held by Noah Lyles. He doubled again at the Mt. SAC Relays the next week, setting the meet record in both events. Arrington broke Michael Norman's 100 meters meet record with a personal best of 10.21 s and won the 200 meters by a full second with a time of 20.44 s. However, he was unable to defend his state championship titles after injuring his hamstring in the Grossmont League championships, and subsequently missed his senior track season due to graduating early in December 2025.

=== Recruiting ===
Arrington was rated as a consensus five-star recruit and a consensus top-20 prospect nationally in the class of 2026. ESPN ranked him as the top athlete and the 18th-best overall recruit in the 2026 class, while East County Sports described him as "East County's most decorated football recruit in history". Arrington received over 50 scholarship offers. He took official visits to Alabama, Oregon, Penn State, Texas A&M, and Washington before narrowing his top choices to Oregon and Texas A&M. On June 19, 2025, Arrington verbally committed to play college football at Texas A&M under head coach Mike Elko, citing his relationship with assistants Jordan Peterson and Bryant Gross-Armiento as key factors in his decision. He signed with the Aggies on National Signing Day in December, and affirmed his commitment later that month despite Peterson's departure after the Aggies' loss in the College Football Playoff.

Following his commitment, Texas A&M coaches compared Arrington to former Aggie corner back Will Lee III, while ESPN analyst Tom Luginbill likened him to Jaylen Mbakwe due to his athleticism and versatility and described him as the "cornerstone pledge to a deep Texas A&M recruiting class". His recruiting rankings were boosted following an impressive performance in the week of the Navy All-American Bowl.

College recruiting
Name	Hometown	School	Height	Weight	Commit date
Brandon Arrington; ATH	San Diego, CA	Mount Miguel HS	6 ft 2 in (1.88 m)	185 lb (84 kg)	Jun 19, 2025
Brandon Arrington; ATH	Recruit ratings: Rivals: 247Sports: ESPN: (91)				
Overall recruit ranking: Rivals: 8 247Sports: 16 ESPN: 11
Note: In many cases, Scout, Rivals, 247Sports, On3, and ESPN may conflict in their listings of height and weight.; In these cases, the average was taken. ESPN grades are on a 100-point scale.; Sources: "2026 Team Ranking". Rivals.com.

== College career ==
Arrington enrolled early at Texas A&M in January 2026. He is projected as a cornerback in college. Arrington had an impressive showing in the Maroon and White spring game.

== Personal life ==
Arrington has cited his maternal grandfather, Milton Earls, as a source of motivation; he died in 2020. "He did a lot for me, my family, and my mom. I think about it all the time. If I ever get into a situation, I think twice because I think about what my grandpa told me," said Arrington. "If anything, I make sure I'm on the right path, do the right thing, and do what he told me to do - Make it big."
