= Tristen Keys =

American football player

No. 80 – Tennessee Volunteers
- Position: Wide receiver
- Class: Freshman

Personal information
- Born: October 19, 2007 (age 19)
- Listed height: 6 ft 2 in (1.88 m)
- Listed weight: 195 lb (88 kg)

Career information
- High school: Hattiesburg (Hattiesburg, Mississippi)
- College: Tennessee (2026–present)

Tristen Keys (born October 19, 2007) is an American college football wide receiver for the Tennessee Volunteers.

== Early life ==
Keys attends Hattiesburg High School in Hattiesburg, Mississippi. As a junior in 2024, he had 58 receptions for 1,275 yards and 14 touchdowns. After the season, he played in the 2025 Under Armour All-America Game.

A five-star recruit, Keys is rated as the consensus number one overall receiver in the class of 2026. In March 2025, he committed to Louisiana State University (LSU) to play college football. He was the highest rated receiver to commit to LSU since Early Doucet in 2004

Keys flipped his commitment from LSU to the University of Tennessee on August 28, 2025.
