= Thomas Wadden =

American clinical psychologist and professor

Thomas A. Wadden
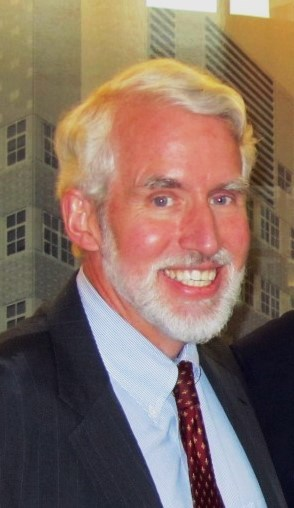
- Born: September 3, 1952 (age 74); Richmond, Virginia, U.S.
- Other name: Tom Wadden
- Citizenship: United States
- Known for: Intensive behavioral therapy for obesity; combining behavioral and pharmacological therapies for obesity; GLP-1 receptor agonists
- Spouse(s): Jan R. Linowitz, Ed.D.
- Children: 3 (David, Michael, Steven)

Academic background
- Education: Brown University (B.A. 1975); University of North Carolina at Chapel Hill (Ph.D. 1981)
- Thesis: Behavioral control of essential hypertension: A comparative study
- Doctoral advisor: W. Grant Dahlstrom, PhD

Academic work
- Discipline: Clinical psychology
- Institutions: Perelman School of Medicine at the University of Pennsylvania; Syracuse University

Thomas A. Wadden (born September 3, 1952) is an American psychologist who is known for his research on the behavioral, pharmacological, and surgical treatment of obesity. He is Professor of Psychology in Psychiatry at the Perelman School of Medicine at the University of Pennsylvania, where he served as Director of the Center for Weight and Eating Disorders for over two decades. From 2011 to 2021, he held the endowed Albert J. Stunkard Professorship in Psychiatry.

Wadden has published more than 525 peer-reviewed scientific papers and edited seven volumes on obesity and eating disorders. He has contributed to national health policy on obesity management, serving on expert panels for the National Institutes of Health, the Federal Trade Commission, the Department of Veterans Affairs, and the United States House of Representatives. He is a former president of The Obesity Society, which in 2015 established the Thomas A. Wadden Award for Distinguished Mentorship, recognizing his education of scientists and practitioners in the field of obesity.

== Early life and education ==
Wadden is a native of Washington, D.C. and a graduate of the Landon School in Bethesda, Maryland.He received his bachelor's degree in psychology, magna cum laude, from Brown University in 1975 and was elected to Phi Beta Kappa. He obtained his Ph.D. in clinical psychology in 1981 from the University of North Carolina at Chapel Hill, where he was honored in 2007 with the Department of Psychology's Distinguished Alumni Award.

== Career ==
Wadden joined the University of Pennsylvania's Department of Psychiatry as an instructor in 1981 and rose to full professor by 1994. From 1992 to 1993, he was Professor of Psychology and Director of Clinical Training at Syracuse University, where he was also founding Director of the Center for Health and Behavior. Returning to Penn in 1994, Wadden directed the Center for Weight and Eating Disorders until 2017. He was the inaugural Albert J. Stunkard Professor in Psychiatry from 2011 to 2021.

Wadden has also taught as Visiting Professor of Psychology at Haverford College (2013–2021) and Bryn Mawr College (2018–2019), offering courses on obesity and health psychology. In addition, he is Clinical Associate Professor at the Philadelphia College of Osteopathic Medicine.

Wadden was President of The Obesity Society in 2005–2006 and increased the organization's public advocacy on behalf of persons with obesity. He served as an associate editor of the society's journal, Obesity (2008–2012 and 2020–2025), and earlier as associate editor of Annals of Behavioral Medicine (1991–1993).

== Research and Clinical Care ==
=== Very-low-calorie diets and early behavioral trials ===
Wadden's research, begun in the 1980s with mentorship from Albert Stunkard and Kelly Brownell, has focused principally on the behavioral and pharmacological management of obesity. His early work on very low-calorie diets (VLCDs) included the first controlled, long-term trial of high-protein VLCDs, which revealed short-term efficacy but frequent weight regain, underscoring the need for weight-loss maintenance strategies.

=== Commercial weight loss programs and consumer protection ===
In the 1990s, Wadden, with Gary Foster, helped establish methods for evaluating commercial weight loss programs, contributing to federal consumer-protection efforts. This work included testifying before a subcommittee of the U.S. House of Representatives and collaborating with the Federal Trade Commission.

=== Pharmacotherapy combined with intensive lifestyle intervention ===
Beginning in 2001, his clinical trials, conducted with Robert Berkowitz and David Sarwer, demonstrated that combining FDA-approved weight loss medications with intensive behavioral therapy produced greater weight reduction than either approach alone. This work contributed to clinical guidelines and the design of pharmaceutical trials.

=== Obesity management in primary care ===
Wadden, with Adam Gilden Tsai, also played a leading role in research that supported the Centers for Medicare and Medicaid Services' 2011 decision to reimburse intensive behavioral therapy (IBT) for obesity when provided in primary care. Their trials showed that brief, protocol-driven IBT sessions, based on the Diabetes Prevention Program and delivered in primary care, produced clinically meaningful weight loss.

=== The Look AHEAD study ===
As a principal investigator on the nearly 20-year, multi-site Look AHEAD trial, chaired by Rena Wing, Wadden helped to show that intensive lifestyle intervention improved cardiometabolic risk factors, physical function, quality of life, and health-care costs in patients with obesity and type 2 diabetes. The intervention, however, did not reduce cardiovascular events.

=== Incretin-based therapies for obesity ===
Since 2013, Wadden has investigated glucagon-like peptide-1 (GLP-1) medications for obesity, including semaglutide and tirzepatide, which produce substantially greater improvements in weight and health than intensive behavioral therapy and the prior generation of weight loss agents. His current work is examining the changing role of behavioral treatment with GLP-1s, as well as the psychiatric safety of the new medications.

=== Psychosocial consequences of obesity and bariatric surgery ===
Throughout his career, Wadden has studied the psychosocial health of persons with obesity and ways to improve it. He also has contributed to the diagnosis, understanding, and treatment of binge eating disorder, as well as to the behavioral and psychosocial evaluation of persons with severe obesity seeking bariatric surgery. With Gary Foster, he developed the Weight and Lifestyle Inventory (WALI), a self-report assessment tool used in many bariatric surgery programs. With colleagues at Penn's Center for Weight and Eating Disorders, Wadden has helped to provide comprehensive obesity management, without charge, to more than 3,400 participants in NIH- and industry-sponsored trials.

== Career publications ==
Wadden has published more than 675 peer-reviewed scientific papers and abstracts, as well as 40 book chapters and 7 co-edited books, including the Handbook of Obesity Treatment (with George Bray, second edition). Since 2020, he has been recognized by Clarivate (Web of Science) as a Highly Cited Researcher. In 2025, he was named by ScholarGPS as the top ranked scholar in obesity "for the preceding 5 years" and as the third highest ranked individual for the period "lifetime."

== Awards and honors ==
Wadden has been recognized by professional societies and universities throughout his career. Early honors included the President's New Researcher Award (1986) from the Association for the Advancement of Behavior Therapy (now the Association for Behavioral and Cognitive Therapies). He was later elected a Fellow of the Society of Behavioral Medicine (1995), the College of Physicians of Philadelphia (2000), and The Obesity Society (2002).

Subsequent honors included the Distinguished Alumni Award from the Department of Psychology at the University of North Carolina at Chapel Hill (2007), the Arthur K. Asbury Outstanding Faculty Mentor Award from the University of Pennsylvania School of Medicine (2007), and the George A. Bray Founder's Award (2009) and TOPS Research Achievement Award (2012), both from The Obesity Society. Other honors included the Bud Orgel Award for Distinguished Achievement in Research (2012), presented by the Association of Health Psychologists in Academic Health Centers, and The Obesity Society's inaugural Thomas A. Wadden Award for Distinguished Mentorship (2015), which was endowed by his mentees.

Later recognitions included an honorary Doctor of Humane Letters from the Philadelphia College of Osteopathic Medicine (2019), designation as a "distinguished leader in obesity medicine" by the American Board of Obesity Medicine (2021), the Friends of Albert (Mickey) Stunkard Lifetime Achievement Award from The Obesity Society (2022), and the George Bray Outstanding Scientific Achievements Award in Obesity Research from the American Society for Nutrition (2025).

In 2021, the University of North Carolina at Chapel Hill established two graduate student awards in his name, funded in part by gifts from Wadden and his sister, Anne Wadden Peck: one for research training in clinical psychology and another for the completion of distinguished research in behavioral medicine and health psychology.

== Selected publications ==
=== Books ===
- Wadden, T.A.; VanItallie, T.B., eds. (1992). Treatment of the Seriously Obese Patient. New York: Guilford Press.
- Stunkard, A.J.; Wadden, T.A., eds. (1993). Obesity: Theory and Therapy (2nd ed.). New York: Raven Press.
- Wadden, T.A.; Stunkard, A.J., eds. (2002). Handbook of Obesity Treatment. New York: Guilford Press.
- Wadden, T.A.; Wilson, G.T.; Stunkard, A.J.; Berkowitz, R.I., eds. (2011). Obesity and Associated Eating Disorders: A Guide for Mental Health Professionals. Philadelphia: Elsevier.
- Wadden, T.A.; Bray, G.A., eds. (2018). Handbook of Obesity Treatment (2nd ed.). New York: Guilford Press.

=== Articles ===
- Wadden, T.A.; Stunkard, A.J. (1985). "Social and psychological consequences of obesity". Annals of Internal Medicine. 103 (6 (Pt 2)): 1062–1067. doi:10.7326/0003-4819-103-6-1062. PMID 4062126.
- Wadden, T.A.; Stunkard, A.J. (1986). "Controlled trial of very low calorie diet, behavior therapy, and their combination in the treatment of obesity". Journal of Consulting and Clinical Psychology. 54 (4): 482–488. doi:10.1037/0022-006X.54.4.482. PMID 3528252.
- Wadden, T.A.; VanItallie, T.B.; Blackburn, G.L. (1990). "Responsible and irresponsible use of very-low-calorie diets in the treatment of obesity". JAMA. 263 (1): 83–85. doi:10.1001/jama.1990.03440010081036. PMID 2403446.
- Wadden, T.A.; Foster, G.D.; Letizia, K.A.; Stunkard, A.J. (1992). "A multicenter evaluation of a proprietary weight reduction program for the treatment of marked obesity". Archives of Internal Medicine. 152 (5): 961–966. doi:10.1001/archinte.152.5.961. PMID 1580722.
- Wadden, T.A.; Berkowitz, R.I.; Womble, L.G.; Sarwer, D.B.; Phelan, S.; Cato, R.K.; et al. (2005). "Randomized trial of lifestyle modification and pharmacotherapy for obesity". New England Journal of Medicine. 353 (20): 2111–2120. doi:10.1056/NEJMoa050156. PMID 16291981.
- Wadden, T.A.; Volger, S.; Sarwer, D.B.; Vetter, M.L.; Tsai, A.G.; Berkowitz, R.I.; et al. (2011). "A two-year randomized trial of obesity treatment in primary care practice". New England Journal of Medicine. 365 (21): 1969–1979. doi:10.1056/NEJMoa1109220.
- Look AHEAD Research Group; Wing, R.R.; Bolin, P.; Brancati, F.L.; Bray, G.A.; Clark, J.M.; et al. (2013). "Cardiovascular effects of intensive lifestyle intervention in type 2 diabetes". New England Journal of Medicine. 369 (2): 145–154. doi:10.1056/NEJMoa1212914. PMID 23796131.
- Wadden, T.A.; Tsai, A.G.; Tronieri, J.S. (2019). "A protocol to deliver intensive behavioral therapy (IBT) for obesity in primary care settings: The MODEL-IBT program". Obesity. 27 (10): 1562–1566. doi:10.1002/oby.22594. PMID 31544345.
- Wadden, T.A.; Bailey, T.S.; Billings, L.K.; Davies, M.; Frias, J.P.; Koroleva, A.; et al. (2021). "Effect of subcutaneous semaglutide vs placebo as an adjunct to intensive behavioral therapy on body weight in adults with overweight or obesity: The STEP 3 randomized clinical trial". JAMA. 325 (14): 1403–1413. doi:10.1001/jama.2021.1831. PMID 33625476.
- Wadden, T.A.; Chao, A.M.; Machineni, S.; Kushner, R.; Ard, J.; Srivastava, G.; et al. (2023). "Tirzepatide after intensive lifestyle intervention in adults with overweight or obesity: The SURMOUNT-3 phase 3 trial". Nature Medicine. 29 (11): 2909–2918. doi:10.1038/s41591-023-02597-w. PMID 37840095.
