= Sam Potolicchio =

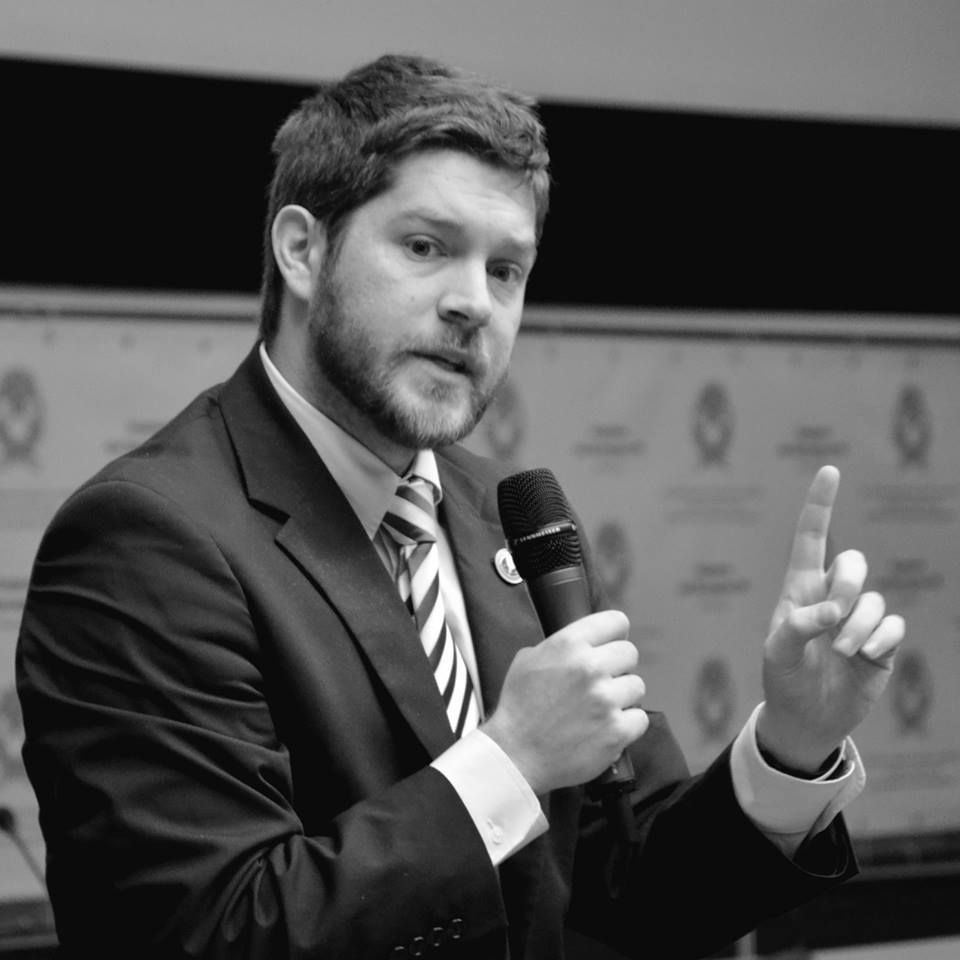
- Potolicchio in 2014
- Education: B.A. in Psychology; B.A. in Government; M.A. in Government; M.T.S. in Theology and Culture; PhD in Government
- Alma mater: Georgetown University; Harvard University
- Occupation: Academic
- Employer(s): Georgetown University; Russian Presidential Academy of National Economy and Public Administration; New York University; Preparing Global Leaders Forum
- Title: Director of Global and Custom Education at McCourt School of Public Policy at Georgetown University; Distinguished Professor and Department Chair of Political Communications at RANEPA; President of Preparing Global Leaders Forum (PGLF)
- Website: www.sampotolicchio.com

Sam Potolicchio (/pɒtɒˈlɪkɪɒ/) is a professor specializing in government, leadership and political communications. He served as Director of Global and Custom Education at Georgetown University's McCourt School of Public Policy Executive Education program and Distinguished Professor and Department Chair of Political Communications at the Russian Presidential Academy of National Economy and Public Administration (RANEPA).

== Education ==
Potolicchio graduated from Georgetown's College of Arts and Sciences with B.A. degrees in both psychology and government. He went on to earn an M.T.S. in Theology and Culture from Harvard University's Divinity School and an M.A. and PhD in Government from Georgetown's Graduate School of Arts and Sciences.

== Career ==
Potolicchio taught at Georgetown University, RANEPA and New York University.

Potolicchio previously served as Director of Global and Custom Education at the McCourt School of Public Policy at Georgetown University. He was the academic director of Georgetown’s Global Visiting Student Program and a lecturer at Georgetown's Global Education Institute (GGEI), where he lectured to senior government officials and corporate executives from emerging economies, including China and Japan.

In 2013, Potolicchio was named Distinguished Professor and Department Chair in Political Communications at the RANEPA's School of Public Policy. In 2016, he started the first English language bachelors program in global governance and leadership in Russia.

Potolicchio founded and serves as President of the Preparing Global Leaders Forum (PGLF).

Potolicchio is the official lecturer on American Federalism for the Open World Leadership Program at the Library of Congress, where he lectures to delegations from post-Soviet countries. He has delivered keynote lectures at over 200 different universities in 75 countries including Oxford, Yale, Cambridge, Sorbonne, LSE, Brown, Dartmouth, Bologna and Warwick. In addition to public lectures, Potolicchio advises political and business leaders internationally and conducts training with corporate audiences.

Potolicchio is the Distinguished Scholar at the Canterbury School of Fort Myers. Previously he was the scholar-in-residence at the Landon School where he had taught fifth grade Latin and served as assistant director of admissions. Potolicchio was, along with Senator Richard Lugar, the Senior Lecturer at the University of Indianapolis Lugar Academy Washington Semester program.

=== Awards ===
In 2012, Princeton Review named Potolicchio one of the “Best Professors in America”, the only professor chosen from his field. Prior to that, Potolicchio received the K. Patricia Cross Award from the Association of American Colleges and Universities in 2011, as one of the future leaders of American higher education. In 2017, Potolicchio was named a winner of the OZY Educator Award, as one of the six most outstanding American educators. He has won numerous teaching awards at Georgetown University.

=== Publications ===
Potolicchio is a columnist for Newsweek Japan, where his regular column covers developments in American politics and government for an international audience. Potolicchio's book chapters on religion and politics have been published in volumes by Congressional Quarterly Press and Oxford University Press.
