= JaReylan McCoy =

American football defensive end for Florida Gators

JaReylan McCoy is an American football defensive end for the Florida Gators. He was a high ranking recruit in the 2026 college football recruiting class. He is a 2025 graduate of Tupelo High School in Tupelo, Mississippi.
