= Lamar Brown =

American football player (born 2007)

No. 55 – LSU Tigers
- Position: Defensive tackle
- Class: Freshman

Personal information
- Born: November 1, 2007 (age 19)
- Listed height: 6 ft 4 in (1.93 m)
- Listed weight: 295 lb (134 kg)

Career information
- High school: Louisiana State University Laboratory School
- College: LSU (2026–present)

Lamar Brown (born November 1, 2007) is an American college football defensive tackle for the LSU Tigers. He was ranked as the number one overall recruit in the class of 2026 by ESPN.

== Early life ==
Brown attended Louisiana State University Laboratory School. In his first three seasons of high school football he was named a MaxPreps All-American on the offensive line. Brown was rated as a five-star recruit, the top overall player in the state of Louisiana, the top interior lineman, and the top overall recruit by ESPN. He listed his finalists as Miami, Texas, Texas A&M, and LSU, and said that his "50-50" was between Texas A&M and LSU. Ultimately he committed to play college football for the LSU Tigers.
