= David Edgar Guyton =

American educator, journalist, poet, and banker (1880–1964)

David Edgar Guyton (February 21, 1880 - April 16, 1964) was an American educator, journalist, poet, and banker. Blinded at age 12, he earned two bachelor's degrees and a master's degree and taught at Blue Mountain College (BMC) for 50 years. He was "the first blind man to be made a full professor in a thoroughly accredited college for seeing students".

== Early years ==
Born on February 21, 1880, at Guyton in Tippah County, Mississippi, David Edgar Guyton was the son of Captain J. J. Guyton and Callie Hoyle Guyton. He had a brother and two sisters. When he was 12 years old, an injury with a penknife caused the loss of sight in one of his eyes. "Several months later," he said, "the other eye was sympathetically affected and I became blind." He had been attending a one-teacher school near where he lived, and after the accident he spent a year at a school for the blind in Jackson, Mississippi, where he had a private tutor. He did not go back there, preferring to be tutored at home. The tutoring was a family effort; he said, "My dear mother almost lost her voice reading to me." Even the house boy joined in the effort, reading poetry to Guyton "by the hour" as he prepared a paper on Keats.

After his home schooling, Guyton enrolled at BMC, which was near his home and where he was the only male among 500 female students. He received a Bachelor of Arts degree in 1903, becoming that school's first male graduate. After that he was appointed instructor of German and French at BMC. His sister went to classes with him to write his dictation on the blackboard and read exercises to him. His work earned him a promotion to professor, this time in English. Guyton continued to study, spending a summer at the University of Chicago before enrolling at the University of Mississippi (UM). In addition to gaining a bachelor of science degree from UM in 1911, he studied law for a year, not intending to practice law but desiring to broaden his education. His activities at UM extended beyond the classroom as he was editor of the school's weekly newspaper and assistant editor of the monthly magazine and yearbook. He was also a member of Phi Delta Theta fraternity.

He taught history at BMC again until he went to Columbia University (CU) to pursue a master of arts degree, graduating in 1914. His major focus there was American history, which he supplemented with courses in economics, sociology, and English literature of the Victorian era. He was the first blind man to graduate from UM and the first blind man to earn a master's degree at CU. During Guyton's time at CU he was accompanied by L. T. Lowrey, a friend from Blue Mountain who pursued the same course of study. Lowery took notes as he attended lectures with Guyton, and he read for his friend as needed.

== Career ==
Guyton initially taught French and German at BMC; later he taught English and education classes. Eventually history and economics became his areas of concentration.

Guyton was the local correspondent for The Commercial Appeal and the Jackson Daily News, primarily writing Sunday features and spot news. He also wrote for The Times-Picayune, The Birmingham Age-Herald, and The Southern Sentinel newspapers. His contributions to The Commercial Appeal spanned more than 50 years, and in 1959 that newspaper designated him correspondent emeritus.

He wrote poems that were published in anthologies, magazines, and newspapers, and he was the author of one book. Mother Berry of Blue Mountain, a biography of Modena Lowery Berry was published by Broadman Press in 1943. A columnist wrote in The Birmingham Age-Herald, "It is not a sentimental book but a simple one of a strong and beautiful character."

Guyton was elected president of the Bank of Blue Mountain on January 17, 1933. An item in The Toronto Daily Star about the election noted that Guyton "will continue his scholastic and newspaper work" and concluded, "He rather likes to have even his spare moments fully occupied." He later became the bank's chief executive officer also.

== Civic activities ==
When Guyton was president of the Rotary Club in Ripley, Mississippi, that club won the President's Award. He was district governor of Rotary International in 1951–1952, the first blind man to hold that position. His speeches at Rotary meetings tended to reflect both his academic background and his religious faith, as when he spoke about then-current economic conditions to the Jackson (Tennessee) Rotary Club in December 1947. He cited economic situations from the past that could provide insights about what might happen, and the local newspaper account of his speech reported, "Prof. Guyton warned that God is still Master of the universe and that He should be taken into account in all our dealings."

In June 1936 Governor Hugh L. White appointed Guyton to a four-year term on the State Blind Commission of Mississippi. Also that month Mississippi's Lieutenant Governor J. B. Snider appointed him to represent that state on the National Poetry Council and to be a delegate to the Congress of American Poets.

== Depot Bible class ==
For 72 years Guyton was a member of Lowrey Baptist Church in Blue Mountain. He taught a men's Bible class at the local depot of the Gulf, Mobile and Ohio Railroad for more than 30 years. By March 1954 trains no longer stopped at the station, and Guyton had retired from his position at the university, but he continued each Sunday to teach the class that included "merchants, farmers, truck drivers, and some of his teaching colleagues". He began each session with a brief review of national and world events of the previous week, then read Scripture and taught the Sunday School lesson. After concluding with a song, most of the men walked up the hill to attend the morning worship service. A columnist wrote about the weekly sessions in The Commercial Appeal, "It's a thing that ought to be preserved and cherished."

== Personal life and death ==
On September 10, 1925, Guyton married Corrine O'Neal Rogers, who taught at BMC and who had attended elementary school with him. They lived near the college, and they had no children. He died in Blue Mountain on April 16, 1964, aged 84, and was buried in Blue Mountain Cemetery.

== Recognition ==
In 1938 Guyton was one of five people in the United States, and the only one in the South, to receive an award given by the Brooklyn Institute for the Blind in recognition of "Conspicuous achievement not usually undertaken by the blind.

Guyton Library on the BMC campus is named in honor of Dr. and Mrs. Guyton. It was dedicated on November 1, 1957, with Paul Flowers, book editor of the Commercial Appeal, as dedicatory speaker. An editorial in The (Jackson, Mississippi) Clarion-Ledger noted some of the couple's achievements and said, "Theirs is a record which is a credit to the college, to the state and to the overall advancement of higher education." The college awarded him an honorary LL. D. degree in 1960.
