= Keisean Henderson =

American football player (born 2007)

No. 5 – Houston Cougars
- Position: Quarterback

Personal information
- Born: October 21, 2007 (age 19)
- Listed height: 6 ft 5 in (1.96 m)
- Listed weight: 195 lb (88 kg)

Career information
- High school: Legacy the School of Sport Sciences (Spring, Texas)
- College: Houston (2026–present)

Awards and highlights
- 2025 Navy All-American Bowl MVP; USA Today Offensive Player of the Year (2025)
- Stats at ESPN

Keisean Henderson (born October 21, 2007) is an American college football quarterback for the Houston Cougars.

== Career ==
Henderson attended Legacy the School of Sport Sciences in Spring, Texas. He played wide receiver his freshman year in 2022 and had 74 receptions for 1,135 yards and 14 touchdowns. As a sophomore he switched to quarterback and completed 90 of 142 passes for 1,574 yards and 21 touchdowns over eight games. As a junior, he passed for 2,689 yards and 25 touchdowns. Henderson played in the 2025 Navy All-American Bowl, where he was named the MVP of the game after completing three of five passes for 146 yards and a touchdown.

A five-star recruit, Henderson was one of the top quarterback and overall recruits in the 2026 class. He committed to the University of Houston to play college football.
