= Richard Anderson (American football) =

American football player

No. 88 – LSU Tigers
- Position: Defensive tackle
- Class: Freshman

Personal information
- Listed height: 6 ft 3 in (1.91 m)
- Listed weight: 339 lb (154 kg)

Career information
- High school: Edna Karr (New Orleans, Louisiana)
- College: LSU (2026–present)

Richard Anderson is an American college football defensive tackle for the LSU Tigers.

== Early life ==
One of nine children and the only boy, Anderson grew up in Baton Rouge, Louisiana, before moving to New Orleans prior to seventh grade. He attended Edna Karr High School in New Orleans where he initially planned to be a basketball player, before being convinced to focus on football after coaches told him of his potential. As a sophomore, he was named first-team all-district.

Anderson then helped Edna Karr to a 14–0 record and a win in the Division I state championship in 2024, posting 44 tackles, 15 tackles-for-loss (TFLs) and 10 sacks. Anderson was a consensus first-team all-state selection for his performance. As a senior in 2025, he helped Edna Karr to another 14–0 record and a state championship, having what USA Today described as "one of the most dominant seasons in recent Louisiana history". In his high school football career, he totaled over 200 tackles and 20 tackles-for-loss with six forced fumbles, earning All-District 9-5A honors in each of his three years on the football team.

A five-star recruit, Anderson was ranked one of the top-30 prospects in the class of 2026, according to 247Sports composite rankings. He committed to play college football for the LSU Tigers and signed with them in December 2025.
