= St. Stephen's & St. Agnes School =

Episcopal school in Alexandria, Virginia, US

St. Stephen's and St. Agnes School (SSSAS)

Location
- Alexandria, Virginia; United States; 38.8173°N 77.1015°W

Information
- Type: Independent preparatory school
- Motto: Living our Mission
- Established: 1924
- Head of school: Kirsten Adams
- Grades: PK - 12
- Enrollment: 1,197 (1,160 non-prekindergartenl) (2021–22)
- Colors: Red, White, Green, Gold
- Athletics: Boys: Interstate Athletic Conference; Girls: Independent School League
- Mascot: Saints
- Newspaper: The Voice
- Yearbook: Traditions
- Affiliation: Episcopalian
- Website: sssas.org

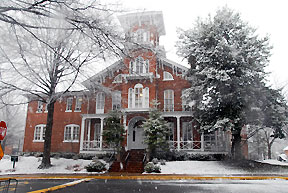
Richard B. Lloyd House

St. Stephen's & St. Agnes School (SSSAS) is an independent Episcopal coed private college preparatory school in the Seminary Ridge neighborhood of Alexandria, Virginia. The school was created from the 1991 merger of St. Agnes School (a girls' school founded in 1924) with St. Stephen's School (a boys' school founded in 1944). The school consists of three campuses within a 1.5-mile radius. The Lower School, grades JK-5, is located on Fontaine Street; the Middle School, grades 6–8, is located on Braddock Road; and the Upper School, grades 9–12, is located on St. Stephen's Road.

St. Stephen's & St. Agnes School serves students from across Northern Virginia, Maryland, and Washington, D.C. The old St. Stephen's was one of the founding schools of the Interstate Athletic Conference.

== Advanced courses offered ==
The school offers Advanced Placement courses in Art History, Biology, Calculus AB, Calculus BC, Chemistry, Comparative Government, Computer Science, Economics (Micro and Macro), English, European History, French Language, Latin, Music Theory, Physics, Psychology, Spanish Language, Spanish Literature, Statistics, Studio 2-D Art, Studio 3-D Art, US Government and Politics, US History and World History.

== Athletics ==
St. Stephen's & St. Agnes School competes in the Interstate Athletic Conference (boys) and Independent School League (girls). The girls' lacrosse team has been ranked in the top ten in the nation, having finished the 2008 season undefeated. The 2010 girls' varsity lacrosse won the ISL league title and the VISAA State Championships. Then in 2009, the girls' lacrosse team won their third consecutive VISAA title as number one.

The sports offered include: baseball, basketball, cross country, field hockey, football, golf, ice hockey, lacrosse, soccer, softball, swimming, tennis, track and field, volleyball, and wrestling.

== Arts ==
The school theatre program, known as the Stage One Players, has won several regional awards for their performances including the Cappies. The 2009 fall production of A Midsummer Night's Dream was nominated for four Cappie Awards (Critics and Artist Program) including lighting, make-up, and supporting actor, putting each in the top five out of 54 productions. In 2015 SSSAS was nominated for five Cappies for the "Richard III" production. Two seniors won a Cappies award in the Creativity category for music composition and performance. In addition, SSSAS received two Cappies nominations for the fall production of “The 39 Steps” in the Sound and Special Effects/Technology categories.

In 2003, the school completed construction of a Chapel and Performing Arts Center (CPAC).

== Sustainability ==
=== Students For Sustainability ===
St. Stephen's and St. Agnes School has a drive for sustainability. The school hosted its ninth annual “Students For Sustainability” conference in spring 2017. The third sustainability conference earned local recognition, where a few attendees were interviewed by WTTG. Students For Sustainability is a conference in which approximately 100 students from the Washington D.C. metro area come together to learn about the issues and discuss plans for achieving better sustainability in schools.

=== Recognition ===
The 2016 Ellen Pickering Environmental Excellence Award has been presented to St. Stephen's & St. Agnes School in Alexandria. The award was presented during the Alexandria Earth Day celebration on April 30, an event sponsored by the City of Alexandria Environmental Policy Commission and Alexandria Renew Enterprises.

St. Stephen's & St. Agnes Middle School was selected as a 2016 U.S. Department of Education Green Ribbon School. This is a national environmental sustainability award presented to schools, districts, and post-secondary institutions. Secretary of Education John King announced the honorees on Earth Day, April 22, 2016. Only six private schools were selected this year and SSSAS is the only one from Virginia, the District of Columbia or Maryland. SSSAS was formally presented with the award on July 20, 2016, in Washington, DC.

== Notable alumni ==
=== St. Agnes School ===
- Anne Mollegen Smith, magazine editor and writer
- Tipper Gore, social issues advocate and first lady of the United States
- Margaret Stender, businesswoman and former college basketball player
- Amy Argetsinger, journalist, staff writer for the Style section of The Washington Post
- Jennifer Griffin, national security correspondent for Fox News

=== St. Stephen's School ===
- Thomas Boswell, sports columnist
- Christopher Meloni, actor
- Terrence Wilkins, former Indianapolis Colts wide receiver

=== St. Stephen's & St. Agnes School (from 1991) ===
- Dave Flemming, radio broadcaster for the San Francisco Giants
- Will Flemming, radio broadcaster for the Boston Red Sox
- G. Zachary Terwilliger, United States Attorney for the Eastern District of Virginia
- Steven Pruitt, Wikipedia editor who has made more edits on the English Wikipedia than any other editor
- Michael Schwimer, baseball player for the Philadelphia Phillies
