= Marcus Mason =

American football player (born 1984)

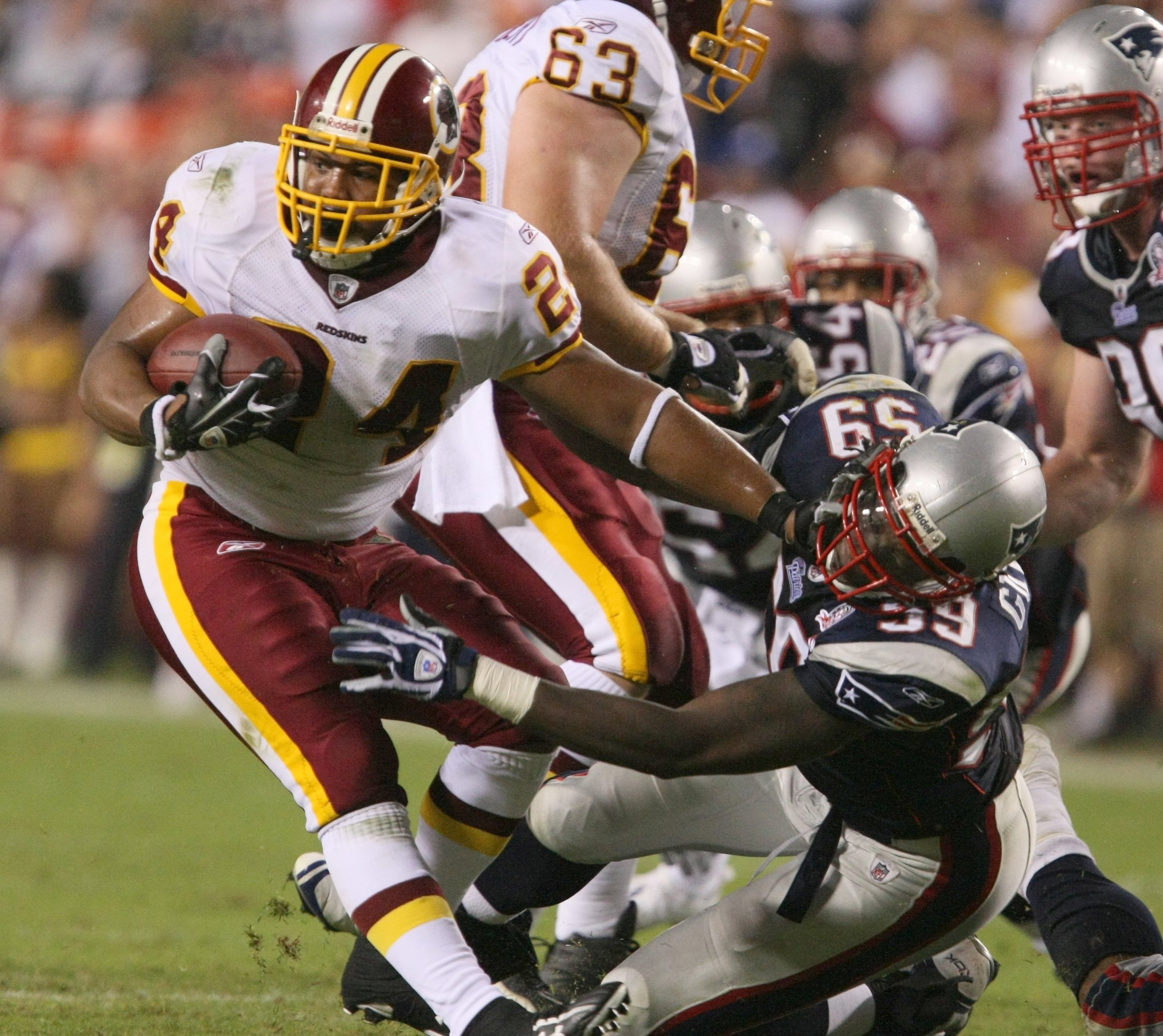
- Mason (#24) fends off Gary Guyton (#59) during a 2009 preseason game

No. 32
- Position: Running back

Personal information
- Born: June 23, 1984 (age 42); Potomac, Maryland, U.S.
- Listed height: 5 ft 9 in (1.75 m)
- Listed weight: 215 lb (98 kg)

Career information
- College: Youngstown State
- NFL draft: 2007: undrafted

Career history
- Washington Redskins (2007); Baltimore Ravens (2008)*; New York Jets (2008); Washington Redskins (2009); San Diego Chargers (2010)*
- * Offseason or practice squad member only

Awards and highlights
- GFC Newcomer of the Year (2005); Second-team All-GFC (2005); First-team All-GFC (2006); GFC Offensive Player of the Year (2006); First-team Division I-FCS All-American (2006)

Career NFL statistics
- Rushing attempts: 32
- Rushing yards: 127
- Receptions: 6
- Receiving yards: 58
- Stats at Pro Football Reference

Marcus Mason (born June 23, 1984) is an American former professional football player who was a running back in the National Football League (NFL). He was the all time leading rusher in Maryland history. He was signed by the Washington Redskins as an undrafted free agent in 2007. He played college football for the Youngstown State Penguins. Mason was also a member of the Baltimore Ravens, New York Jets, and San Diego Chargers.

== Early life ==
Mason starred at Georgetown Preparatory School in Bethesda, Maryland, where he became the all-time leading rusher (5,700 yards) in Maryland high school history.

== College career ==
Mason played college football at the University of Illinois and Youngstown State University. In two seasons at Youngstown State, Mason compiled 2,739 rushing yards on 478 carries and scored 31 touchdowns. As a senior, he rushed for a school-record 1,847 yards on 302 carries and had 23 touchdowns.

== Professional career ==
Pre-draft measurables
Height	Weight	40-yard dash	10-yard split	20-yard split	20-yard shuttle	Three-cone drill	Vertical jump	Broad jump	Bench press
5 ft 8 5/8 in (1.74 m)	216 lb (98 kg)	4.67 s	1.59 s	2.67 s	4.71 s	7.53 s	31.5 in (0.80 m)	9 ft 2 in (2.79 m)	22 reps
All values from Pro Day

=== First stint with Redskins ===
In his first ever preseason game with the Redskins, Mason scored a one-yard rushing touchdown to give the Redskins a 7-6 lead over the Tennessee Titans. For the whole preseason, Mason compiled 95 yards on 25 carries. Mason eventually made the 53-man roster in 2007 but was moved to the practice squad shortly after to make room for Omar Stoutmire.

Despite leading the NFL in rushing during the 2008 preseason, Mason was released by the Redskins during final cuts on August 30.

=== Baltimore Ravens ===
A day after his release from the Redskins, Mason was signed to the Baltimore Ravens' practice squad on August 31, 2008. He remained there for the first eight weeks of the season.

=== New York Jets ===
Mason was signed to the New York Jets' active roster off the Baltimore Ravens' practice squad on October 29, 2008. The move came a day after Jets running back Jesse Chatman was placed on season-ending injured reserve. The Jets waived Mason on December 9.

Mason was re-signed to the practice squad on December 21, 2008. He was waived by the team the following offseason on April 27, 2009.

=== Second stint with Redskins ===
Mason was claimed off waivers by the Washington Redskins on April 28, 2009. On October 20, 2009 the Redskins released Mason. He was re-signed on November 23.

On March 4, 2010, Mason was released by the Redskins.

=== San Diego Chargers ===
On March 8, 2010, Mason was claimed off waivers by the San Diego Chargers. On August 31, 2010, Mason was released by the San Diego Chargers.
