= Kyonte Hamilton =

American football player (born 2002)

Profile
- Position: Defensive tackle

Personal information
- Born: November 7, 2002 (age 24); District Heights, Maryland, U.S.
- Listed height: 6 ft 4 in (1.93 m)
- Listed weight: 305 lb (138 kg)

Career information
- High school: Georgetown Preparatory School (North Bethesda, Maryland)
- College: Rutgers (2021–2024)
- NFL draft: 2025: 7th round, 224th overall pick

Career history
- Houston Texans (2025–2026)
- Stats at Pro Football Reference

Kyonte Hamilton (born November 7, 2002) is an American professional football defensive tackle. He played college football for the Rutgers Scarlet Knights and was selected in the seventh round of the 2026 NFL draft by the Houston Texans.

== Early life ==
Hamilton was born on November 7, 2002, and grew up in District Heights, Maryland, near Washington, D.C.. At age five, his father introduced him to football and wrestling. He attended Georgetown Preparatory School where he excelled in both sports. In football, he played as a quarterback and linebacker. In wrestling, he won two national championships, two NHSCA championships and two IAC championships. He recruited in both wrestling and football: he was ranked the second-best wrestling recruit nationally and a three-star football prospect, and committed to play both sports for the Rutgers Scarlet Knights.

== College career ==
Hamilton played football for Rutgers from 2021 to 2024, appearing in all 51 games during that time, 31 as a starter. He was mainly used as a defensive tackle, but also saw playing time at defensive end due to injuries to other players. As a freshman in 2021, he posted 22 tackles and two tackles-for-loss (TFLs). He compiled a record of 3–1 as a freshman wrestler, competing in the heavyweight class, but dropped the sport prior to his sophomore year to focus on football. He won a starting role in 2022 and recorded 24 tackles, three TFLs and a sack. The following season, he posted 28 tackles and one sack. As a senior in 2024, Hamilton tied for the team lead with four sacks and recorded 36 tackles, leading the defensive line, along with five TFLs, being named honorable mention All-Big Ten Conference. He also placed second on the team with 27 quarterback pressures. He concluded his collegiate career having recorded 110 tackles, 11 TFLs, and six sacks.

== Professional career ==
Hamilton was not invited to the NFL Combine, although he did participate in Rutgers's pro day on March 22, 2025.

Pre-draft measurables
Height	Weight	Arm length	Hand span	Wingspan	40-yard dash	10-yard split	20-yard split	20-yard shuttle	Three-cone drill	Vertical jump	Broad jump	Bench press
6 ft 3 3/8 in (1.91 m)	305 lb (138 kg)	32 1/8 in (0.82 m)	9 1/4 in (0.23 m)	6 ft 7 3/8 in (2.02 m)	5.03 s	1.70 s	2.87 s	4.58 s	7.58 s	29.0 in (0.74 m)	9 ft 2 in (2.79 m)	29 reps
All values from Pro Day

Hamilton was selected by the Houston Texans in the seventh round (224th overall) of the 2025 NFL draft. He was placed on injured reserve on August 1, 2025.

On August 30, 2026, Hamilton was waived/injured by the Texans. He was re-signed to the practice squad on October 20. He was released on November 4.
