= Modena Lowrey Berry =

American educator

- circa 1920
- Born: November 16, 1850; Farmington, Mississippi, US
- Died: January 31, 1942; Blue Mountain, Mississippi, US
- Occupations: cofounder Blue Mountain Female Institute, Educator
- Spouse: William Edwin Berry (b. 1847 – d. 1919)
- Children: 3

Modena Lowrey Berry (November 16, 1850 – January 31, 1942) was cofounder of the Blue Mountain Female Institute in Blue Mountain, Mississippi in 1873 and served as a faculty member and vice president of the institute for the next 61 years.

== Biography ==
Modena Lowrey was born November 16, 1850, in Farmington, Mississippi to Mark Perrin Lowrey and Sarah Holmes Lowrey and was the eldest of eleven children. She was educated at the Buchanan School for Girls (aka Stonewall College) in Ripley, Mississippi and graduated in 1869. That same year, Modena's father purchased the Brougher estate in Blue Mountain, Mississippi. In 1871, Modena and her sister Margaret enrolled at Baptist Female College in Pontotoc, Mississippi and graduated in 1873. Upon returning home to Blue Mountain, the sisters and their father cofounded Blue Mountain Female Institute in 1873 on the site of the Brougher plantation and used the plantation home to board female students.

Although Modena Berry served in a number of positions at Blue Mountain Institute, her main contributions were as principal and vice president for 61 years (1873 to 1934). Because of her compassion shown towards the students, she was usually addressed by them as Mother Berry.

== Personal life ==
In 1876, Modena Lowrey married William Edwin Berry (b. 1847 – d. 1919), who was professor of Greek and Latin as well as a business manager at Blue Mountain Female Institute. The couple lived in Blue Mountain and were the parents of three children.

Modena Berry died at her home in Blue Mountain on January 31, 1942, at age 91 and was interred in Blue Mountain Cemetery.

== Legacy ==
The Blue Mountain Female Institute, that Modena Lowrey Berry cofounded with her father and sister, eventually became Blue Mountain Christian University.

Modena Berry became the second woman in state history to be inducted into the Mississippi Hall of Fame to honor her significant contributions to the state. Her portrait is on display in Mississippi's Old Capitol Museum in Jackson.
