= Zion Elee =

American football player

No. 0 – Maryland Terrapins
- Position: Defensive end
- Class: Freshman

Personal information
- Born: November 13, 2007 (age 18)
- Listed height: 6 ft 4 in (1.93 m)
- Listed weight: 220 lb (100 kg)

Career information
- High school: Saint Frances (Baltimore, Maryland)
- College: Maryland (2026–present)

Zion Elee is an American college football defensive end for the Maryland Terrapins.

== Early life ==
Elee attended Joppatowne High School in Joppatowne, Maryland his first two years of high school before transferring to Saint Frances Academy in Baltimore, Maryland prior to his junior year in 2024. As a sophomore at Joppatowne in 2023, he had 64 tackles and 13 sacks. As a junior at Saint Francis in 2024, he recorded 56 tackles and 10 sacks.

A five-star recruit, Elee is ranked as the second best overall recruit in the 2026 class by 247Sports. He committed to the University of Maryland, College Park to play college football. He was the highest rated recruit commitment in school history.
