= Landon School =

Prep school in Bethesda, Maryland, US

Location
- 6101 Wilson Lane; Bethesda, Maryland 20816; United States; 38°59′26″N 77°07′31″W

Information
- Type: Private; college-prep
- Motto: Latin: Virtute et non vi (By virtue, not by force.)
- Established: 1929; 97 years ago
- Headmaster: Jim Neil
- Teaching staff: 85.9 (on a FTE basis)
- Grades: 3–12
- Gender: Boys
- Enrollment: 715 (2025-2026)
- Student to teacher ratio: 6.1
- Campus: Suburban
- Campus size: 75 acres (30 ha)
- Colors: Brown and white
- Athletics: 22 interscholastic sports
- Athletics conference: Interstate Athletic Conference
- Nickname: Bears
- Tuition: $55,750 Grades 6-12, $50,250 Grades 3-5
- Website: landon.net

Landon School is a private, college-preparatory school for boys in grades 3–12, with an enrollment of approximately 710 students, in Bethesda, Maryland, just outside Washington, D.C.

== Background ==
Paul Landon Banfield and his wife, Mary Lee, founded Landon School in 1929. The school's first location was a former residence in the Sheridan-Kalorama neighborhood of Washington, D.C., now home to the Embassy of Estonia. Banfield moved Landon to its present 75-acre (300,000 m^{2}) campus in Bethesda in 1935. The farmhouse, stables, and barn from the previous use of the Bethesda property still stand on the campus and are used today.

In September 2022, as a part of the Landon School's redesign of its campus, the 100-year-old Andrews House was relocated in order to make space for the new Boehly Upper School building. Moving the 9,000-square-foot, 1,122-ton historic building was a delicate operation that required months of planning.

The school has a reputation for cultivating athletes.

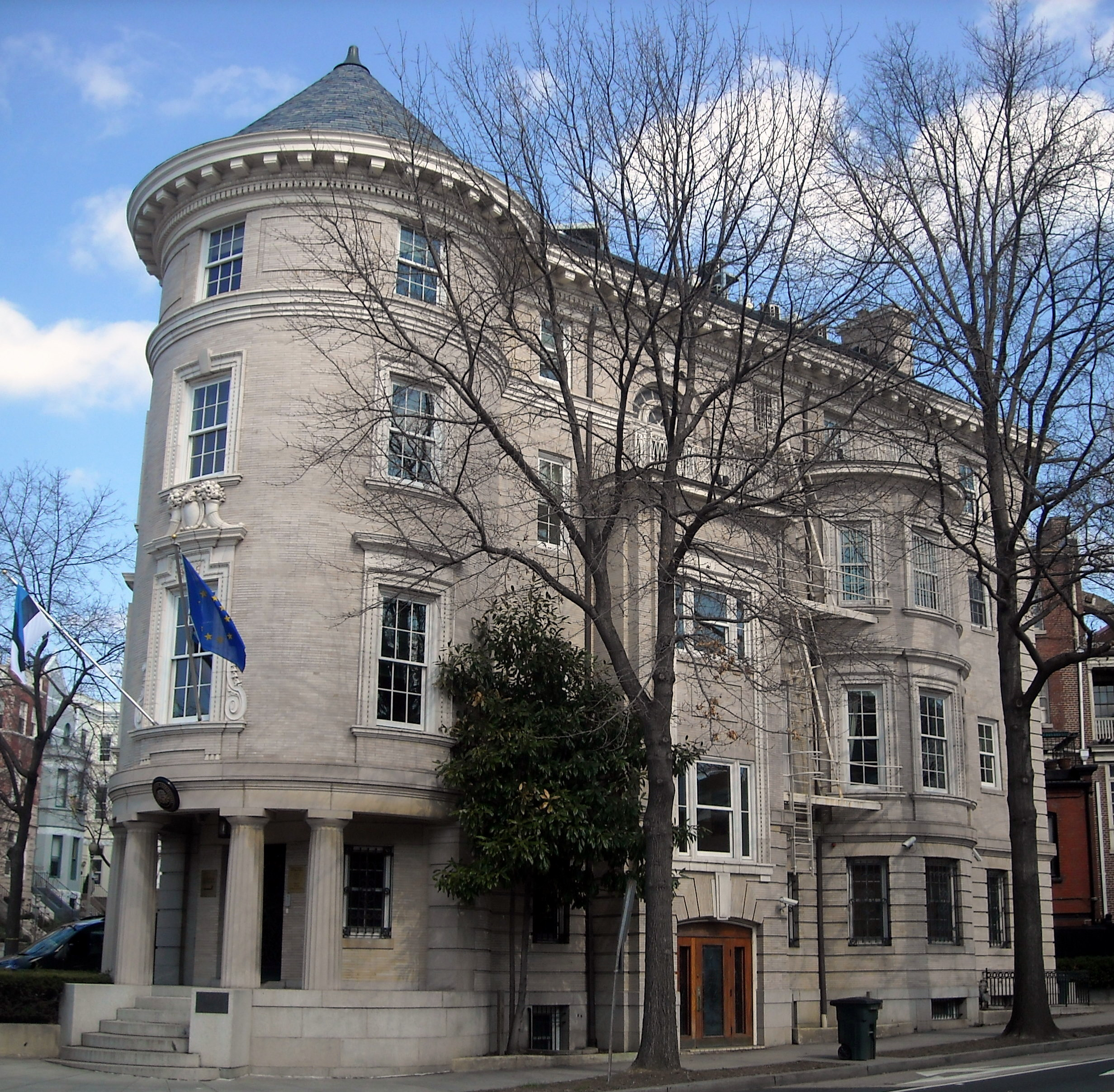
The school's original location in Washington, D.C. is now the Embassy of Estonia.

== Academics ==
Landon School is a college preparatory school for boys in grades 3-12. The school's daily schedule is from 8:00 a.m. – 3:40 p.m., with flexible and extended hours for before/aftercare and athletics. The school states that the schedule for each division is age-appropriately designed to maximize students' most attentive hours.

The Lower School schedule includes periods for each subject, consisting of language arts, science, social studies, math, music, and ethics classes, broken up by movement opportunities, athletics training, and quiet reading time.

Middle School and Upper School utilize rotating block schedules that are similarly designed to maximize students' attention, with breaks for movement and club meetings in between. In 2023, the School moved the sixth grade from the Middle School to the Lower School.

In 2018, Landon announced it would discontinue AP courses to focus on offering its own set of high-level "advanced" courses that better align with their Mission, Philosophy, and Portrait of a Graduate. 88% of the Class of 2026 is attending a college or university where they applied for early decision or early action.

Funded by its namesake Cary M. Maguire '46, the Maguire Ethics Scholarship Program awards a merit-based scholarship of $10,000 to a student entering Upper School who demonstrates the highest standards of ethics, integrity, and character. Scholarships are available to both new applicants and current eighth-grade students.

== Extracurriculars ==
The school offers 22 athletics options, including varsity interscholastic sports such as swimming, soccer, water polo, football, cross country, ice hockey, wrestling, basketball, baseball, track, tennis, golf, rugby, volleyball and lacrosse. Landon also offers interscholastic club sports such as riflery, fencing, squash and ultimate Frisbee, as well as intramural sports and strength and conditioning.

In collaboration with Holton-Arms School, Landon School performs three productions per year, a musical and a non musical, and spring One-Acts. In addition to acting, students can learn lighting, sound and set design. The School offers theatrical class, boys Improv Club and Director's Workshop where students can create and direct their own original play.

Additionally, the school teaches arts such as painting, advanced drawing, architecture, ceramics, digital art, sculpture and photojournalism. Students can submit their work to regional and national competitions or to the school's on campus magazine entitled, Prometheus Unbound.

== Athletics ==
Landon competes in the Interstate Athletic Conference (IAC) alongside six other schools in D.C., MD, and VA. The IAC consists of 12 sports: baseball, basketball, cross country, football, golf, ice hockey, lacrosse, soccer, swimming and diving, tennis, track and field, volleyball, and wrestling.

=== Lacrosse ===
In 2017, Landon was in the top 2 of USA Today's Super 25 boys lacrosse rankings.

=== Wrestling ===
Landon School wrestler Joel Brown was named All-Met Wrestler of the Year by The Washington Post, after a 32-3 season. In 2023, The Landon School's wrestling team won the Interstate Athletic Conference title, its fourth since 2018. 13 of 14 Landon wrestlers reached the finals, eight of whom won their final matches.

=== Hockey ===
The Landon School's hockey team won the Interstate Athletic Conference title in February 2023. The team defeated Bullis to claim the win after a tied score forced a shootout. The Hershey Bears hockey team signed Landon School alumnus Sam Anas to play in the 2022-2023 season. In 2011, Anas led the Landon Bears in a 25-0-1 season.

=== Soccer ===
In 2022, The Landon School's soccer team beat St. Albans to win the Interstate Athletic Conference championship. Landon School alumnus Kristian Fletcher signed a contract in 2022 to play professional soccer for D.C. United. While playing for Landon School, Fletcher was named the All-Met Player of the Year in boys' soccer by The Washington Post.

=== Baseball ===
In 2016, The Landon baseball team won its first Interstate Athletic Conference title since 2011, beating Bullis by a score of 8-4.

== Heads of school ==
Since its founding in 1929, Landon School has had six headmasters.

1. Paul Landon Banfield (1929–1970)
2. Hugh C. Riddleberger (1970–1981)
3. Malcolm Coates (1981–1990)
4. Damon F. Bradley (1990–2004)
5. David M. Armstrong (2004–2015)
6. Jim Neill (2015–2026)
7. Andy Martire (2026–current)

== Controversies ==
In spring 2010, it was revealed that students allegedly planned a fantasy football-like "draft" in which female students at other local schools were chosen for each "team," and "points" were to be scored on the basis of sexual encounters with those students. The revelations came in the wake of the news about George Huguely V—a former Landon lacrosse player and football quarterback—who was charged in the murder of his girlfriend Yeardley Love.

In September 2022, several Landon School students were seen in a viral video singing a racial slur while riding the Washington Metro. The school issued a statement that it was aware of the incident and "deeply concerned".

In 2022, the parents of Landon student Charlie Schnell withdrew their son after he was accused of drawing disturbing images of Black people and sharing it with a Black classmate. Schnell was bullied over the incident and disturbed by another student's threat of a school shooting. Less than two weeks later, Schnell committed suicide using a Landon banner, and his parents held the school responsible, saying that their biggest mistake was sending their son to Landon. Lawyers for the school sought unsuccessfully to dismiss a lawsuit brought by the student's parents. A confidential settlement was reached in 2025.

In the fall of the 2002-2003 school year, ten Landon students were caught cheating on their SAT exams. Among these students were eight who admitted to the offense one month later after rumors had spread throughout the school. Those eight students were suspended for the remaining month of the fall semester, though they were allowed to take their fall semester exams. Two other students were pressed to withdraw from Landon or face expulsion.

== Notable alumni ==
- Sam Anas – hockey player for HC Dinamo Minsk. In 2026, Anas took home the KHL top scorer award
- Jaye Andrews – former professional basketball player in the British Basketball League
- Darion Atkins – basketball player for Maccabi Ironi Ramat Gan of the Israeli Basketball Premier League
- Ned Bittinger – portrait painter and illustrator
- Todd Boehly – part-owner of the Los Angeles Dodgers and Chelsea Football Club
- Robbie Bordley – first modern-era captain of the United States national rugby union team, teacher and renowned lacrosse coach at Landon School
- Alan Brinkley – historian and Columbia University provost from 2003 to 2009
- Donald Dell – former Davis Cup player and coach, first sports agent in professional tennis
- Bill Eacho – former US Ambassador to Austria (2009–2012)
- Ahmet Ertegun – Turkish-American businessman, founder of Atlantic Records
- Nicholas Hammond – American actor
- Fred Hetzel – played six seasons in NBA, top pick of 1965 NBA draft
- Rush Holt – physicist and former Congressman (1999–2015) (D-NJ)
- George Huguely – University of Virginia student convicted of second-degree murder of Yeardley Love, a fellow student at UVA.
- Ken Jenkins – NFL running back and kick return specialist
- Rufus G. King III – Chief Judge, DC Superior Court, 2000–2008
- Knight Kiplinger – editor emeritus of Kiplinger's Personal Finance magazine
- Bronson La Follette – Wisconsin Attorney General from 1974 to 1986
- Gregory S. Martin – retired U.S. Air Force four-star general
- Nick Martin – founder and CEO of TechChange
- James McEwan – whitewater canoeing bronze medalist at 1972 Summer Olympics
- Doug McKelway – television "journalist" for Fox News
- Fred McNair – professional tennis player, 1976 French Open doubles champion
- Sam Potolicchio – educator
- Maury Povich – television personality, host of Maury, a syndicated talk show
- Danny Rubin (born 1991) – American-Israeli basketball player for Bnei Herzliya of the Israeli Basketball Premier League
- Mike Rutenberg – defensive coordinator for the Cleveland Browns
- Jonathan D. Schiller – American lawyer who is a co-founder and managing partner of the law firm Boies Schiller Flexner LLP
- Tom Scott – co-founded Nantucket Nectars
- Teddy Sears – actor
- Topper Shutt – TV weatherman
- Thomas Tamm – US Justice Department attorney, illegal wiretapping whistleblower
- Thomas A. Wadden - Professor of Psychology in Psychiatry, University of Pennsylvania, Perelman School of Medicine.
- Matt Ward – Tewaaraton Trophy winner and NCAA lacrosse All-American
- Brooke Seawell - Venture Capitalist. Serveing on the Board of Directors as the Audit Committee Chair for several corporations, notably Nvidia.
