= LaDamion Guyton =

American football player

Texas Tech Red Raiders
- Position: Defensive end
- Class: Freshman

Personal information
- Listed height: 6 ft 3 in (1.91 m)
- Listed weight: 225 lb (102 kg)

Career information
- High school: Benedictine (Savannah, Georgia)
- College: Texas Tech (2026–present)

LaDamion Guyton is an American college football defensive end for the Texas Tech Red Raiders.

== Early life ==
Guyton is from Savannah, Georgia. He first attended Savannah Christian Preparatory School where he played football as a defensive end. As a freshman, he totaled 82 tackles, 19.5 tackles-for-loss (TFLs) and 10 sacks while helping his team to the state Class 3A championship, earning first-team All-Greater Savannah honors. He then appeared in nine games as a sophomore in 2024, posting 52 tackles, 13.5 TFLs and 6.5 sacks while helping Savannah to the state playoff quarterfinals. Guyton transferred to Benedictine Military School in Savannah for his junior year in 2025. He posted over 60 tackles and helped Benedictine to an appearance in the state championship.

Guyton was initially ranked a five-star recruit and one of the top prospects in the class of 2027, being ranked top-five nationally by Rivals.com, 247Sports and ESPN, including being ranked the number one overall prospect by Rivals. He committed to play college football for the Texas Tech Red Raiders in August 2025, becoming the highest-ranked recruit in school history. He received a name, image, and likeness (NIL) deal worth $3.5 million for signing with the Red Raiders. In October 2025, he announced his decision to reclassify into the class of 2026. Guyton was ranked a top-15 prospect in the class of 2026 after his reclassification.
