= 2026 Texas Longhorns football team =

American college football season

2026 Texas Longhorns football
- Conference: Southeastern Conference

Ranking
- Coaches: No. 6
- AP: No. 5
- CFP: No. 5
- Record: 9–2 (6–2 SEC)
- Head coach: Steve Sarkisian (6th season)
- Offensive coordinator: Kyle Flood (6th season)
- Co-offensive coordinator: A. J. Milwee (6th season)
- Offensive scheme: Pro-style spread
- Defensive coordinator: Will Muschamp (1st (Note: 2008–2010, 2026–present) season)
- Home stadium: Darrell K Royal–Texas Memorial Stadium

2026 Southeastern Conference football standings
	Conf.			Overall
Team	W		L	W		L
No. 1 Georgia y	8	–	1	10	–	1
No. 5 Texas	6	–	2	9	–	2
No. 9 Tennessee	6	–	2	9	–	2
No. 3 Alabama	6	–	2	9	–	2
No. 22 Oklahoma	5	–	3	7	–	4
No. 24 Florida	5	–	4	7	–	4
No. 16 Kentucky	5	–	4	7	–	4
No. 25 Ole Miss	4	–	4	7	–	4
Auburn	4	–	4	7	–	4
Missouri	4	–	4	7	–	4
No. 21 South Carolina	4	–	5	6	–	5
LSU	3	–	5	6	–	5
Mississippi State	2	–	6	5	–	6
Arkansas	2	–	6	4	–	7
Texas A&M	1	–	7	4	–	7
Vanderbilt	1	–	7	4	–	7
Championship: Georgia vs TBD
^ – College Football Playoff participant; $ – Conference champion; y – Championship game participant; As of November 22, 2026; Rankings from CFP rankings

The 2026 Texas Longhorns football team represents the University of Texas at Austin as a member of the Southeastern Conference (SEC) during the 2026 NCAA Division I FBS football season. The season is Texas' 134th overall season, and their 3rd as a member of the SEC. The team is led by Steve Sarkisian in his sixth year as their head coach and offensive play-caller, with Will Muschamp making his return as defensive coordinator, and offensive coordinator Kyle Flood returning along with co-offensive coordinator A. J. Milwee. The team plays its home games at Darrell K Royal–Texas Memorial Stadium in Austin, Texas.

The year prior to this saw the Longhorns finish 10–3 despite entering the 2025 season as the consensus preseason number one team. They finished ranked 12th in the final AP poll after a Citrus Bowl victory over Michigan. Previous defensive coordinator Pete Kwiatkowski, analyst Duane Akina, and running backs coach Chad Scott were fired that December as part of a major coaching staff shakeup by Sarkisian. The offseason saw the arrival of multiple high profile transfers to the Forty Acres which included wide receiver Cam Coleman and linebacker Rasheem Biles, among others, and the signing of a consensus top-10 nationally ranked high school recruiting class.

Notable players from the 2025 team who returned in 2026 include Citrus Bowl MVP and quarterback Arch Manning, second-team All-SEC wide receiver Ryan Wingo, first-team All-American return specialist Ryan Niblett, first-team All-SEC defensive end Colin Simmons, and first-team All-SEC offensive tackle Trevor Goosby.

Texas's Week 2 victory over No. 1 Ohio State marked its largest comeback win since 2007 and the largest fourth-quarter comeback against an AP No. 1-ranked team in NCAA football history. The Longhorns trailed 23–3 entering the fourth quarter but scored 21 unanswered points to win 24–23.

== Offseason ==
Position key

Back	B	Center	C	Cornerback	CB	Defensive back	DB
Defensive end	DE	Defensive lineman	DL	Defensive tackle	DT	End	E
Fullback	FB	Guard	G	Halfback	HB	Kicker	K
Kickoff returner	KR	Offensive tackle	OT	Offensive lineman	OL	Linebacker	LB
Long snapper	LS	Punter	P	Punt returner	PR	Quarterback	QB
Running back	RB	Safety	S	Tight end	TE	Wide receiver	WR

=== Offseason departures ===
==== NFL draftees ====
Player	Round	Pick	Team	Position	Notes
Anthony Hill Jr.	2	60	Tennessee Titans	LB	
Malik Muhammad	4	124	Chicago Bears	CB	
Trey Moore	4	130	Miami Dolphins	LB	
Michael Taaffe	5	158	Miami Dolphins	S	Wuerffel Trophy winner
DJ Campbell	6	200	Miami Dolphins	OL	
Jack Endries	7	221	Cincinnati Bengals	TE	
Jack Bouwmeester	Undrafted		San Francisco 49ers	P	
Cole Brevard	Undrafted		Kansas City Chiefs	DL	
Ethan Burke	Undrafted		Baltimore Ravens	DE	
Matthew Caldwell	Undrafted		Los Angeles Rams	QB	
Jaylon Guilbeau	Undrafted		Carolina Panthers	CB	
Travis Shaw	Undrafted		Baltimore Ravens	DL	
Mason Shipley	Undrafted		New Orleans Saints	K	

(Note: Marshall Landwehr (LB) and Lance St. Louis (LS) were the two departures who did not declare for the Draft at the end their of their senior seasons.)

==== Outgoing transfers ====
Name	Pos.	Height	Weight	Hometown	GP	Year	New school	Ref
Elijah Barnes	LB	6'1''	230	Dallas, TX	4	Freshman	Kentucky	
CJ Baxter	RB	6'1''	216	Orlando, FL	8	Sophomore	Kentucky	
Nick Brooks	OL	6'7''	360	Loganville, GA	5	Freshman	Alabama	
Aaron Butler	WR	6'0''	165	Calabasas, CA	3	(redshirt) Freshman	Oregon State	
Caleb Chester	CB	6'2''	175	Missouri City, TX	1	Freshman	Arizona State	
Christian Clark	RB	5'11''	195	Phoenix, AZ	8	(redshirt) Freshman	South Carolina	
Daniel Cruz	OL	6'3''	295	North Richland Hills, TX	2	(redshirt) Freshman	NC State	
Jaime Ffrench	WR	6'1''	184	Jacksonville, FL	4	Freshman	Michigan	
Jerrick Gibson	RB	5'10''	215	Gainesville, FL	4	Sophomore	Purdue	
Graham Gillespie	DB	6'0''	195	Cypress, TX	1	Senior	North Texas	
Melvin Hills III	DL	6'3''	275	Lafayette, LA	4	(redshirt) Freshman	UConn	
Lavon Johnson	DL	6'3''	295	Allentown, PA	7	Junior	Maryland	
Nate Kibble	OL	6'3''	315	Humble, TX	3	(redshirt) Freshman	Baylor	
Liona Lefau	LB	6'1''	211	Kahuku, HI	12	Junior	Colorado	
Parker Livingstone	WR	6'3''	190	Lucas, TX	13	(redshirt) Freshman	Oklahoma	
DeAndre Moore Jr.	WR	6'0''	188	Los Alamitos, CA	11	Junior	Colorado	
Trey Owens	QB	6'5''	235	Cypress, TX	0	(redshirt) Freshman	Arkansas State	
Colin Page	RB	6'0''	203	Austin, TX	1	Senior	North Texas	
Ricky Stewart Jr.	RB	5'11''	180	Tyler, TX	0	Freshman	SFA	
Will Stone	K	6'0''	175	Austin, TX	4	Senior	UCF	
Connor Stroh	OL	6'6''	350	Frisco, TX	11	Sophomore	Kansas	
Neto Umeozulu	OL	6'4''	285	Allen, TX	12	Junior	North Texas	
Jordan Washington	TE	6'4''	220	Houston, TX	12	(redshirt) Freshman	North Carolina	
Santana Wilson	CB	6'0''	173	Scottsdale, AZ	2	(redshirt) Freshman	Louisville	
Quintrevion Wisner	RB	5'11''	186	DeSoto, TX	9	Junior	Florida State	

*GP denotes Games played for the Longhorns in the 2025 season by listed player.

=== Incoming transfers ===
Name	Pos.	Height	Weight	Hometown	Year	Prev school	Commit	Ref
Sterling Berkhalter	WR	6'3"	203	Cincinnati, OH	(redshirt) Senior	Wake Forest	Jan 30, 2026	
Rasheem Biles	LB	6'1"	220	Pickerington, OH	Senior	Pittsburgh	Jan 10, 2026	
Markus Boswell	LB	6'1"	230	Austin, TX	Sophomore	Akron	Jan 18, 2026	
Raleek Brown	RB	5'9"	195	Santa Ana, CA	(redshirt) Senior	Arizona State	Jan 8, 2026	
Mac Chiumento	P	6'4"	221	Daytona Beach, FL	(redshirt) Senior	Florida State	Jan 8, 2026	
Cam Coleman	WR	6'3"	201	Phenix City, AL	Junior	Auburn	Jan 11, 2026	
Justin Cryer	LB	6'1"	237	Katy, TX	Senior	Florida State	Jan 9, 2026	
Trey DuBuc	LS	6'1"	219	Fort Lauderdale, FL	(redshirt) Junior	New Mexico	Jan 4, 2026	
Ian Geffrard	DL	6'5"	387	Mableton, GA	(redshirt) Junior	Arkansas	Jan 4, 2026	
Nick Hudson	DB	5'10"	175	Houston, TX	(redshirt) Senior	Brown	Apr 17, 2026	
Bo Mascoe	CB	5'11"	185	Kissimmee, FL	(redshirt) Junior	Rutgers	Jan 6, 2026	
Michael Masunas	TE	6'5"	259	Chandler, AZ	(redshirt) Senior	Michigan State	Jan 5, 2026	
MJ Morris	QB	6'1"	191	Atlanta, GA	(redshirt) Senior	Coastal Carolina	Jan 22, 2026	
Jonte Newman	OT	6'4"	275	Cypress, TX	(redshirt) Fresh.	Texas A&M	Jan 14, 2026	
Paris Patterson	OL	6'4"	355	East St. Louis, IL	(redshirt) Junior	SMU	Mar 31, 2026	
Laurance Seymore	OL	6'2"	312	Miami, FL	Graduate	Western Kentucky	Jan 27, 2026	
Melvin Siani	OT	6'6"	275	Kingston, PA	(redshirt) Junior	Wake Forest	Jan 15, 2026	
Dylan Sikorski	OL	6'5"	290	Sumner, WA	(redshirt) Soph.	Oregon State	Jan 9, 2026	
Hollywood Smothers	RB	5'10"	190	Charlotte, NC	(redshirt) Junior	NC State	Jan 11, 2026	
Darius Snow	LB	6'1"	230	Frisco, TX	(redshirt) Senior	Michigan State	Apr 11, 2026	
Gianni Spetic	K	6'1"	190	Chardon, OH	Senior	Memphis	Jan 5, 2026	
Zion Williams	DL	6'3"	330	Lufkin, TX	(redshirt) Fresh.	LSU	Jan 8, 2026	

=== Recruits ===
The Horns signed a total of 24 recruits, 23 on prior to National Signing Day. The 2026 class was a consensus top 10 nationally and top 3 in the SEC according to the 247Sports.com Composite Rankings, On3's Rivals.com, and ESPN.

College recruiting (2026)
Name	Hometown	School	Height	Weight	Commit date
John Meredith III; CB	Fort Worth, TX	Trinity High School	6 ft 2 in (1.88 m)	175 lb (79 kg)	Jun 19, 2026
John Meredith III; CB	Recruit ratings: Rivals: 247Sports: ESPN: (93)				
Dia Bell; QB	Fort Lauderdale, FL	American Heritage High School	6 ft 3 in (1.91 m)	220 lb (100 kg)	Jun 17, 2024
Dia Bell; QB	Recruit ratings: Rivals: 247Sports: ESPN: (91)				
Tyler Atkinson; LB	Lawrenceville, GA	Grayson High School	6 ft 2 in (1.88 m)	205 lb (93 kg)	Jul 15, 2025
Tyler Atkinson; LB	Recruit ratings: Rivals: 247Sports: ESPN: (91)				
Richard Wesley; EDGE	Los Angeles, CA	Sierra Canyon School	6 ft 5 in (1.96 m)	244 lb (111 kg)	Jun 22, 2025
Richard Wesley; EDGE	Recruit ratings: Rivals: 247Sports: ESPN: (91)				
Jermaine Bishop Jr. ATH	Willis, TX	Willis High School	5 ft 11 in (1.80 m)	155 lb (70 kg)	May 14, 2025
Jermaine Bishop Jr. ATH	Recruit ratings: Rivals: 247Sports: ESPN: (83)				
Jamarion Carlton; DL	Temple, TX	Temple High School	6 ft 5 in (1.96 m)	260 lb (120 kg)	Nov 29, 2025
Jamarion Carlton; DL	Recruit ratings: Rivals: 247Sports: ESPN: (83)				
Derrek Cooper; RB	Fort Lauderdale, FL	Chaminade-Madonna College Preparatory School	6 ft 1 in (1.85 m)	210 lb (95 kg)	Jul 20, 2025
Derrek Cooper; RB	Recruit ratings: Rivals: 247Sports: ESPN: (90)				
John Turntine III; OL	Fort Worth, TX	North Crowley High School	6 ft 4 in (1.93 m)	260 lb (120 kg)	Jul 4, 2025
John Turntine III; OL	Recruit ratings: Rivals: 247Sports: ESPN: (84)				
James Johnson; DL	Miami, FL	Miami Northwestern High School	6 ft 3 in (1.91 m)	285 lb (129 kg)	Jul 15, 2025
James Johnson; DL	Recruit ratings: Rivals: 247Sports: ESPN: (83)				
Kosi Okpala; LB	Katy, TX	Mayde Creek High School	6 ft 2 in (1.88 m)	215 lb (98 kg)	Jul 3, 2025
Kosi Okpala; LB	Recruit ratings: Rivals: 247Sports: ESPN: (80)				
Samari Matthews; DB	Huntersville, NC	William Amos Hough High School	6 ft 0 in (1.83 m)	180 lb (82 kg)	Jul 11, 2025
Samari Matthews; DB	Recruit ratings: Rivals: 247Sports: ESPN: (83)				
Nicolas Robertson; OL	Spring, TX	Klein High School	6 ft 4 in (1.93 m)	300 lb (140 kg)	Mar 29, 2025
Nicolas Robertson; OL	Recruit ratings: Rivals: 247Sports: ESPN: (81)				
Kohen Brown; WR	Waxahachie, TX	Waxahachie High School	6 ft 0 in (1.83 m)	189 lb (86 kg)	Jun 8, 2025
Kohen Brown; WR	Recruit ratings: Rivals: 247Sports: ESPN: (79)				
Hayward Howard Jr. DB	New Orleans, LA	Edna Karr High School	6 ft 2 in (1.88 m)	175 lb (79 kg)	May 9, 2025
Hayward Howard Jr. DB	Recruit ratings: Rivals: 247Sports: ESPN: (81)				
Rocky Cummings; LB	Carlsbad, CA	Carlsbad High School	6 ft 4 in (1.93 m)	220 lb (100 kg)	Nov 26, 2025
Rocky Cummings; LB	Recruit ratings: Rivals: 247Sports: ESPN: (77)				
Chris Stewart; WR	Pearland, TX	Shadow Creek High School	6 ft 0 in (1.83 m)	175 lb (79 kg)	Jun 25, 2024
Chris Stewart; WR	Recruit ratings: Rivals: 247Sports: ESPN: (81)				
Toray Davis; S	Boulder, CO	Fairview High School	6 ft 0 in (1.83 m)	185 lb (84 kg)	Dec 2, 2025
Toray Davis; S	Recruit ratings: Rivals: 247Sports: ESPN: (77)				
Jett Walker; RB	Georgetown, TX	Georgetown High School	6 ft 2 in (1.88 m)	205 lb (93 kg)	Nov 23, 2025
Jett Walker; RB	Recruit ratings: Rivals: 247Sports: ESPN: (79)				
Yaheim Riley; S	Austin, TX	Anderson High School	6 ft 0 in (1.83 m)	175 lb (79 kg)	May 16, 2025
Yaheim Riley; S	Recruit ratings: Rivals: 247Sports: ESPN: (76)				
Kaden Scherer; OL	Georgetown, TX	Georgetown High School	6 ft 6 in (1.98 m)	275 lb (125 kg)	Nov 24, 2025
Kaden Scherer; OL	Recruit ratings: Rivals: 247Sports: ESPN: (76)				
Charlie Jilek; TE	Portage, MI	Portage Central High School	6 ft 5 in (1.96 m)	240 lb (110 kg)	Nov 13, 2025
Charlie Jilek; TE	Recruit ratings: Rivals: 247Sports: ESPN: (74)				
Elijah Ali; DL	Downey, CA	St. Pius X - St. Matthias Academy	6 ft 4 in (1.93 m)	285 lb (129 kg)	Jan 31, 2026
Elijah Ali; DL	Recruit ratings: Rivals: 247Sports:				
Brinley Tita; EDGE	Humble, TX	Summer Creek High School	6 ft 2 in (1.88 m)	225 lb (102 kg)	Apr 15, 2026
Brinley Tita; EDGE	Recruit ratings: Rivals: 247Sports:				
Mikey Bukauskas; P	Prosper, TX	Prosper High School	6 ft 3 in (1.91 m)	205 lb (93 kg)	Jun 10, 2025
Mikey Bukauskas; P	Recruit ratings: Rivals: 247Sports: ESPN: (76)				
Jake Collett; K	Ringgold, GA	Heritage High School	6 ft 0 in (1.83 m)	175 lb (79 kg)	Jun 8, 2025
Jake Collett; K	Recruit ratings: Rivals: 247Sports: ESPN: (75)				
Trott O'Neal; LS	Plano, TX	Prestonwood Christian Academy	6 ft 2 in (1.88 m)	235 lb (107 kg)	May 2, 2025
Trott O'Neal; LS	Recruit ratings: Rivals: 247Sports: ESPN: (68)				
Overall recruit ranking: Rivals: 7th 247Sports: 6th
Note: In many cases, Scout, Rivals, 247Sports, On3, and ESPN may conflict in their listings of height and weight.; In these cases, the average was taken. ESPN grades are on a 100-point scale.; Sources: "Rivals commits". Rivals.; "ESPN commits". ESPN.; "2026 Team Ranking". Rivals.com.; "247Sports commits". 247Sports.

2026 overall class ranking

Website	National rank	Conference rank	5 star recruits	4 star recruits	3 star recruits	2 star recruits	1 star recruits	No star ranking
On3 Rivals	#7	#3	4	12	10	0	0	0
247 Sports	#6	#2	2	12	12	0	0	0
ESPN	—	—	5	9	9	1	0	0

=== Returning starters ===
The Longhorns return twelve starters from the previous season. They return six on offense, five on defense, and one on special teams.

Offense
Player	Class	Position
Arch Manning	Junior	QB
Ryan Wingo	Junior	WR
Emmett Mosley	Junior	WR
Trevor Goosby	Junior	OL
Connor Robertson	Senior	OL
Brandon Baker	Junior	OL

Defense
Player	Class	Position
Colin Simmons	Junior	EDGE
Hero Kanu	Senior	DL
Alex January	Junior	DL
Jelani McDonald	Senior	DB
Graceson Littleton	Sophomore	DB

Special Teams
Player	Class	Position
Ryan Niblett	Junior	KR/PR

== Preseason ==
=== Outlook and news ===
Texas more aggressively pursued players in the transfer portal compared to a year prior. This decision necessitated the reallocation of NIL money in order to afford high-profile transfers. In total 25 players portaled out of Texas due to disagreements over their contracts or playing time. This was offset by an incoming transfer class of 23 players and 25 incoming freshman recruits. The offensive line was a point of emphasis and Texas brought in LG Laurence Seymore and RT Melvin Siani with the expectation they would start, along with three other OL transfers for experienced depth. The running back room also saw a big impact from the portal with the arrival of Hollywood Smothers and Raleek Brown. Headlining the transfer class were WR Cam Coleman (No. 4 overall transfer according to 247sports.com) and LB Rasheem Biles (No. 1 linebacker transfer per On3).

Spring practices for the team began on March 9 with limited media presence. The annual Longhorn spring game (sometimes referred to as the Orange & White game) was set to return on April 18, 2026, after a one-year hiatus to conclude the spring. In 2025, head coach Steve Sarkisian had cancelled it due to roster turnover and attrition from the previous two seasons. On April 6, Sarkisian announced that the spring game was being replaced with Football Fan Day instead due to a series of injuries. Fan Day included an open practice at Memorial Stadium.

On July 22, Texas offensive lineman Cole Hutson was granted an injunction against the NCAA for an age-based request for an additional fifth season of eligibility, allowing him to play in the 2026–27 season. The following day, it was revealed that cornerback John Meredith III would be reclassifying, forgoing his senior year of high school to enroll at Texas in the fall. Fall camp began on Wednesday, August 5, in Austin. In the preseason coaches poll the team was ranked fourth nationally, and received two first place votes. In the preseason AP Poll, the team was ranked fifth nationally, but with no first place votes.

On August 22, Texas linebacker Ty'Anthony Smith was dismissed from the program. Fall camp concluded for the Horns in late August, the new defense under Will Muschamp outperformed the offense throughout.

=== Award watch lists ===
Listed in the order that they were released

Award	Name	Position	Year	Source
Lott Trophy	Colin Simmons	EDGE	Junior	
Dodd Award	Steve Sarkisian	HC	–	
Maxwell Award	Arch Manning	QB	Junior	
Maxwell Award	Cam Coleman	WR	Junior	
Bronko Nagurski Trophy	Colin Simmons	EDGE	Junior	
Bronko Nagurski Trophy	Rasheem Biles	LB	Senior	
Outland Trophy	Trevor Goosby	OL	Junior	
Outland Trophy	Brandon Baker	OL	Junior	
John Mackey Award	Michael Masunas	TE	Senior	
Rimington Trophy	Connor Robertson	OL	Senior	
Lou Groza Award	Gianni Spetic	K	Senior	
Paul Hornung Award	Ryan Niblett	WR	Junior	
Wuerffel Trophy	Colin Simmons	EDGE	Junior	
Lombardi Award	Trevor Goosby	OL	Junior	
Lombardi Award	Rasheem Biles	LB	Senior	
Lombardi Award	Colin Simmons	EDGE	Junior	
Jim Thorpe Award	Jelani McDonald	DB	Senior	
Butkus Award	Rasheem Biles	LB	Senior	
Walter Camp Award	Arch Manning	QB	Junior	
Walter Camp Award	Cam Coleman	WR	Junior	
Walter Camp Award	Colin Simmons	EDGE	Junior	
Walter Camp Award	Rasheem Biles	LB	Senior	
Doak Walker Award	Hollywood Smothers	RB	Junior	
Doak Walker Award	Raleek Brown	RB	Senior	
Biletnikoff Award	Cam Coleman	WR	Junior	
Biletnikoff Award	Ryan Wingo	WR	Junior	
Johnny Unitas Golden Arm Award	Arch Manning	QB	Junior	
Polynesian Football Player of the Year Award	Brandon Baker	OL	Junior	
Chuck Bednarik Award	Colin Simmons	EDGE	Junior	
Chuck Bednarik Award	Rasheem Biles	LB	Senior	
Manning Award	Arch Manning	QB	Junior	
Earl Campbell Tyler Rose Award	Arch Manning	QB	Junior	
Earl Campbell Tyler Rose Award	Cam Coleman	WR	Junior	
Earl Campbell Tyler Rose Award	Trevor Goosby	OL	Junior	
Shaun Alexander Freshman of the Year	Jermaine Bishop Jr.	WR	Freshman	
Shaun Alexander Freshman of the Year	Tyler Atkinson	LB	Freshman	
Shaun Alexander Freshman of the Year	Richard Wesley	EDGE	Freshman	

=== Preseason All-Americans ===
Pre-season All-American Honors
Player	Position	Class	Designation	AP	CBS Sports	ESPN	PFF	SI	SN	WCFF
Arch Manning	QB	Junior	1st Team Offense (WCFF); 2nd Team Offense (SN)	–	–	–	–	–	✓	✓
Colin Simmons	EDGE	Junior	1st Team Defense (AP); 1st Team Defense (CBS); 1st Team Defense (ESPN); 1st Team Defense (SI); 1st Team Defense (WCFF); 1st Team Defense (SN)	✓	✓	✓	–	✓	✓	✓
Trevor Goosby	OL	Junior	1st Team Offense (AP); 1st Team Offense (CBS); 1st Team Offense (ESPN); 1st Team Offense (SI); 1st Team Offense (WCFF); 1st Team Offense (SN)	✓	✓	✓	–	✓	✓	✓
Rasheem Biles	LB	Senior	1st Team Defense (AP); 1st Team Defense (CBS); 1st Team Defense (ESPN); 1st Team Defense (SI); 1st Team Defense (WCFF); 1st Team Defense (SN)	✓	✓	✓	–	✓	✓	✓
Cam Coleman	WR	Junior	1st Team Offense (AP); 1st Team Offense (CBS); 1st Team Offense (ESPN); 1st Team Offense (SI); 2st Team Offense (WCFF); 1st Team Offense (SN)	✓	✓	✓	–	✓	✓	✓
Ryan Niblett	PR	Junior	1st Team Specialists (CBS); 1st Team Specialists (ESPN); 1st Team Specialists (SI); 1st Team Specialists (SN)	–	✓	✓	–	✓	✓	–

=== Preseason SEC awards ===
2026 Preseason All-SEC teams

==== Media ====
First Team
Position	Player	Class
Offense
WR	Cam Coleman	JR
OL	Trevor Goosby	JR
Defense
EDGE	Colin Simmons	JR
LB	Rasheem Biles	SR
Special Teams
PR	Ryan Niblett	JR

Second Team
Position	Player	Class
Offense
QB	Arch Manning	JR
AP	Ryan Niblett	JR
Special Teams
LS	Trey Dubuc	JR

Third Team
Position	Player	Class
Offense
RB	Hollywood Smothers	JR
WR	Ryan Wingo	JR
OL	Brandon Baker	JR
Defense
DB	Jelani McDonald	SR

==== Coaches ====
First Team
Position	Player	Class
Offense
WR	Cam Coleman	JR
OL	Trevor Goosby	JR
Defense
EDGE	Colin Simmons	JR
LB	Rasheem Biles	SR
Special Teams
RS	Ryan Niblett	JR

Second Team
Position	Player	Class
Offense
QB	Arch Manning	JR

Third Team
Position	Player	Class
Offense
RB	Hollywood Smothers	JR
WR	Ryan Wingo	JR
OL	Brandon Baker	JR
AP	Ryan Niblett	JR
Defense
DB	Jelani McDonald	SR
Special Teams
LS	Trey Dubuc	JR

== Schedule ==
Texas announced its full schedule on December 11, 2025. The schedule consisted of seven home games, four away games, and one neutral site game in the regular season. 2026 will be the first year of the SEC's nine-game conference schedule. ESPN's College Football Power Index rated Texas' schedule the 2nd toughest in the country before the season.

Date	Time	Opponent	Rank	Site	TV	Result	Attendance
September 5	2:30 p.m.	Texas State*	No. 5	Darrell K Royal–Texas Memorial Stadium; Austin, TX	ESPN	W 59–7	102,738
September 12	6:30 p.m.	No. 1 Ohio State*	No. 4	Darrell K Royal–Texas Memorial Stadium; Austin, TX (College GameDay)	ABC	W 24–23	105,044
September 19	7:00 p.m.	UTSA*	No. 1	Darrell K Royal–Texas Memorial Stadium; Austin, TX	SECN+	W 30–6	103,753
September 26	11:00 a.m.	at No. 14 Tennessee	No. 1	Neyland Stadium; Knoxville, TN (College GameDay)	ABC	W 20–17	101,915
October 10	2:30 p.m.	vs. Oklahoma	No. 1	Cotton Bowl; Dallas, TX (Red River Rivalry, SEC Nation)	ABC	L 24–27	92,100
October 17	11:00 a.m.	Florida	No. 7	Darrell K Royal–Texas Memorial Stadium; Austin, TX	ABC	L 24–27	103,989
October 24	6:30 p.m.	No. 7 Ole Miss	No. 19	Darrell K Royal–Texas Memorial Stadium; Austin, TX	ABC	W 34–27	104,306
October 31	6:30 p.m.	Mississippi State	No. 11	Darrell K Royal–Texas Memorial Stadium; Austin, TX	ESPN	W 31–3	103,586
November 7	11:00 a.m.	at No. 18 Missouri	No. 7	Faurot Field; Columbia, MO	ESPN	W 34–20	63,690
November 14	6:30 p.m.	at No. 21 LSU	No. 6	Tiger Stadium; Baton Rouge, LA	ABC	W 22–21	102,321
November 21	2:30 p.m.	Arkansas	No. 5	Darrell K Royal–Texas Memorial Stadium; Austin, TX (rivalry)	ESPN	W 45–3	103,508
November 27	6:30 p.m.	at Texas A&M		Kyle Field; College Station, TX (Lone Star Showdown)	ABC		
*Non-conference game; Rankings from AP Poll (and CFP Rankings, after November 3) – Released prior to game; All times are in Central time; Source:

== Rankings ==
Ranking movements Legend: ██ Increase in ranking ██ Decrease in ranking ( ) = First-place votes
	Week															
Poll	Pre	1	2	3	4	5	6	7	8	9	10	11	12	13	14	Final
AP	5	4 (2)	1 (56)	1 (58)	1 (62)	1 (61)	7	19	11	10	8	8	5			
Coaches	4 (2)	3 (1)	1 (42)	1 (46)	1 (45)	1 (45)	6	18	11	11	8	8	6			
CFP	Not released									7	6	5				Not released

== Game summaries ==
=== vs Texas State ===
Cam Coleman catches his first touchdown pass as a Longhorn from Arch Manning during the game

Texas opened the season at home against in-state Pac-12 opponent Texas State. It was the second meeting in history between the two programs. Texas won in a blowout, 59–7.

The game kicked off with a 105 °F heat index and on-field temperatures reportedly reached 160 °F. The Bobcats won the toss and elected to receive. They ended their six-play drive with a punt. On the Horn's first play from scrimmage transfer running back Hollywood Smothers bounced to the outside and outran two defenders for a 45-yard rush. On third down Manning found transfer wide receiver Cam Coleman in the corner of the endzone to open the scoring 7–0. Texas' next drive ended with a 8-yard touchdown jet sweep to Ryan Wingo. State missed a field goal and transfer back Raleek Brown scored on 13-yd run to cap an 80-yard drive. On the following drive transfer linebacker Rasheem Biles forced a fumble and it was returned 59-yards by Graceson Littleton for a touchdown. The Bobcats scored after two chunk plays and a 4-yard rushing touchdown. The half ended with a Manning interception in the Bobcat endzone and a score of 28–7.

Texas scored on all three of its possessions in the third quarter, first on a 20-yard pass to Coleman, then on a 13-yard out route to Smothers, and finally on a 25-yard rush by Brown up the middle. Texas State turned the ball over on each of their third quarter drives due to a Maraad Watson forced fumble and Biles interception, respectively. The Cats missed a field goal at the start of the fourth, and Texas' Gianni Spetic responded with a 48-yarder to extend the lead to 52–7. The final scoring play came from running back James Simon with 2:08 left in the game. Simon took the handoff out of the pistol and cut back inside for a 7-yard touchdown and final score of 59–7. It was the most points scored by the Horns since 2021. Manning finished with 305 passing yards, the most in a season opener since Sam Ehlinger, and four touchdowns. The defense allowed 349 total yards but forced three turnovers. Sarkisian said after the game that he held back much of their scheme and kept the playcalling vanilla ahead of their week two matchup with Ohio State.

Texas State Bobcats (0–0) at No. 5 Texas Longhorns (0–0) – Game summary

Quarter	1	2	3	4	Total
Bobcats	0	7	0	0	7
No. 5 Longhorns	14	14	21	10	59

at Darrell K Royal–Texas Memorial Stadium • Austin, Texas

- Date: September 5
- Game time: 2:30 p.m.
- Game weather: Sunny • Temperature: 96 °F (36 °C)
- Game attendance: 102,738
- Referee: Jeff Heaser
- TV announcers (ESPN): Roy Philpott, Brock Osweiler, and Sherree Burruss
- Box Score

Game information

First quarter

- (10:31) TEX – Cam Coleman 6-yard pass from Arch Manning (Gianni Spetic kick), (Drive: 4 plays, 56 yards, 1:48; Texas 7–0)
- (4:14) TEX – Ryan Wingo 8-yard pass from Arch Manning (Gianni Spetic kick), (Drive: 7 plays, 58 yards, 2:32; Texas 14–0)

Second quarter

- (7:53) TEX – Raleek Brown 13-yard run (Gianni Spetic kick), (Drive: 13 plays, 80 yards, 6:18; Texas 21–0)
- (5:56) TEX – Graceson Littleton 59-yard fumble return (Gianni Spetic kick), (Drive: 5 plays, 28 yards, 1:51; Texas 28–0)
- (3:59) TXST – Davian Jackson 4-yard run (Dylan Cunanan kick), (Drive: 5 plays, 75 yards, 1:57; Texas 28–7)

Third quarter

- (12:46) TEX – Cam Coleman 6-yard pass from Arch Manning (Gianni Spetic kick), (Drive: 6 plays, 75 yards, 2:14; Texas 35–7)
- (7:55) TEX – Hollywood Smothers 13-yard pass from Arch Manning (Gianni Spetic kick), (Drive: 9 plays, 42 yards, 4:04; Texas 42–7)
- (5:00) TEX – Raleek Brown 21-yard run (Gianni Spetic kick), (Drive: 3 plays, 45 yards, 1:03; Texas 49–7)

Fourth quarter

- (6:00) TEX – Gianni Spetic 48-yard field goal (Drive: 12 plays, 50 yards, 5:48; Texas 52–7)
- (5:00) TEX – James Simon 7-yard run (Gianni Spetic kick), (Drive: 4 plays, 16 yards, 1:54; Texas 59–7)

Statistics	TXST	TEX
First downs	18	26
Plays–yards	70–349	70–516
Rushes–yards	41–161	36–156
Passing yards	188	360
Passing: comp–att–int	20–29–1	26–34–1
Turnovers	3	1
Time of possession	30:26	29:34

Team	Category	Player	Statistics
Texas State	Passing	Brad Jackson	15–23, 150 yards, INT
Texas State	Rushing	Jaylen Jenkins	6 carries, 34 yards
Texas State	Receiving	Tucker Cusano	3 receptions, 58 yards
Texas	Passing	Arch Manning	20–27, 305 yards, 4 TD, INT
Texas	Rushing	Hollywood Smothers	10 carries, 70 yards
Texas	Receiving	Ryan Wingo	7 receptions, 121 yards, TD

=== vs No. 1 Ohio State ===
The Longhorns made history in week two with a dramatic comeback victory over the #1 Ohio State Buckeyes. Trailing 23–3 entering the fourth quarter the Horns rallied to score 21 unanswered points and win 24–23. It was the team's biggest comeback since 2007, their first victory over a #1 team since 2008, and the first at home since 1950.

The game started out disastrously for UT, with Raleek Brown fumbling the ball on the first play of the game. The Buckeyes had to settle for a field goal and took a 3–0 lead. Manning had Cam Coleman on a deep over route on their next drive but as Coleman dove for it, the ball popped out directly to Ohio State safety Jaylen McClain for an interception. Ohio State drove down the field and extended their lead to 10 with a Ja'Kobi Jackson touchdown run. Texas punted next and the Buckeyes were stopped on 4th & 2 at the Texas 13-yardline. Texas kicked a 37-yard field goal next to cut the lead to 10–3, but the Buckeyes responded in kind with 30-yarder of their own. After a failed Longhorns fourth down conversion Julian Sayin found Jeremiah Smith in the endzone for a 19-yard touchdown pass. The Texas offense mustered just 97-yards and a field goal in the entire first half. The Buckeyes meanwhile capitalized on Texas' mistakes jumping to a 20–3 lead and were set to receive at the start of the third quarter.

Hollywood Smothers scores the game-tying touchdown

Ohio State and Texas both punted on their first possessions of the second half, but a 48-yard field goal next put OSU ahead 23–3. Both teams punted on the next two possessions. The Horns finally found the endzone after converting 4th & 9 and recovering their own fumble to cap a 91-yard drive with a 3-yard touchdown pass to Ryan Wingo. The Texas defense forced a punt and the offense again converted a 4th & 6 on a 72-yard drive that ended with a Hollywood Smothers 1-yard touchdown run. Texas now only trailed 17–23 with 7:14 left. The Buckeyes drove 48-yards and looked to put the game away with a 45-yard field goal and 4:16 left on the clock but the ball was shanked left, leaving the Longhorns a chance. UT orchestrated a flawless 12-play, 73-yard, 3:51 minute long drive that brought them to the OSU one yardline, and on 3rd & goal Smothers dove over the line for the game-tying touchdown. Gianni Spetic's extra point kick was true and the Longhorns took their first lead of the game 24–23. With only 0:25 left in the game OSU failed to get in field goal range and the game ended with Sayin's Hail Mary attempt picked off by Graceson Littleton to seal the incredible comeback.

The Longhorns 20-point comeback not only matched school records but was the largest fourth-quarter rally to win against an AP #1 team ever. Texas took over the #1 ranking in both major polls after defeating Ohio State.

No. 1 Ohio State Buckeyes (1–0) at No. 4 Texas Longhorns (1–0) – Game summary

Quarter	1	2	3	4	Total
No. 1 Buckeyes	10	10	3	0	23
No. 4 Longhorns	0	3	0	21	24

at Darrell K Royal–Texas Memorial Stadium • Austin, Texas

- Date: September 12
- Game time: 6:30 p.m.
- Game weather: Sunny
- Game attendance: 105,044
- Referee: Kole Knueppel
- TV announcers (ABC): Chris Fowler (play-by-play), Kirk Herbstreit (analyst), Holly Rowe, and Laura Rutledge (sideline reporters)
- Box Score

Game information

First quarter

- (12:04) OSU – Connor Hawkins 26-yard field goal, (Drive: 4 plays, 11 yards, 02:45; Ohio State 3–0)
- (05:39) OSU – Ja'Kobi Jackson 8-yard run (Connor Hawkins kick), (Drive: 10 plays, 81 yards, 04:36; Ohio State 10–0)

Second quarter

- (05:42) TEX – Gianni Spetic 37-yard field goal, (Drive: 16 plays, 69 yards, 07:41; Ohio State 10–3)
- (01:41) OSU – Connor Hawkins 30-yard field goal, (Drive: 9 plays, 63 yards, 04:01; Ohio State 13–3)
- (00:10) OSU – Jeremiah Smith 19-yard pass from Julian Sayin (Connor Hawkins kick), (Drive: 4 plays, 49 yards, 00:39; Ohio State 20–3)

Third quarter

- (08:09) OSU – Connor Hawkins 48-yard field goal, (Drive: 7 plays, 43 yards, 01:51; Ohio State 23–3)

Fourth quarter

- (14:19) TEX – Ryan Wingo 3-yard pass from Arch Manning (Gianni Spetic kick), (Drive: 15 plays, 91 yards, 06:28; Ohio State 23–10)
- (07:14) TEX Hollywood Smothers 1-yard run (Gianni Spetic kick), (Drive: 13 plays, 72 yards, 05:32; Ohio State 23–17)
- (00:25) TEX – Hollywood Smothers 1-yard run (Gianni Spetic kick), (Drive: 12 plays, 73 yards, 3:51; Texas 24–23)

Statistics	OSU	TEX
First downs	19	25
Plays–yards	63–372	78–336
Rushes–yards	31–94	41–141
Passing yards	278	195
Passing: comp–att–int	17–32–1	23–37–1
Turnovers	1	2
Time of possession	28:32	31:28

Team	Category	Player	Statistics
Ohio State	Passing	Julian Sayin	17/32, 278 yards, TD, INT
Ohio State	Rushing	Bo Jackson	19 carries, 74 yards
Ohio State	Receiving	Jeremiah Smith	8 receptions, 164 yards, TD
Texas	Passing	Arch Manning	23/37, 195 yards, TD, INT
Texas	Rushing	Hollywood Smothers	21 carries, 74 yards, 2 TD
Texas	Receiving	Emmett Mosley V	5 receptions, 65 yards

=== vs UTSA ===
On September 26, the Longhorns defeated Jeff Traylor's Roadrunners 30–6 at home in DKR. The game was marred by undisiplined play on both sides, with the teams combining for 203 total yards in penalties.

On the first play of the game Longhorn linebacker Rasheem Biles intercepted UTSA quarterback Owen McCown's deflected pass, and Texas' ensuing drive ended with 24-yard touchdown pass from Manning to Cam Coleman. The Roadrunners leaned on the run game the next drive and got to within the Texas 11-yardline but had to settle for a field goal. Gianni Spetic responded with a 52-yard field goal to extend UT's lead 10–3. UTSA quickly punted and Arch found Coleman in the endzone again for a 3-yard touchdown pass. The San Antonians punted again but the Horns struggled and turned the ball over on downs on an incomplete pass. After another UTSA punt, Texas had the ball and was driving until Manning sustained a vicious hit on a scramble, knocking his helmet free. Despite this, Sarkisian and co. kept him in the game. Before the hit Arch was 11/16 and afterwards he struggled in the passing game, going 5/16. The only further scoring in the first half came from a 34-yard Spetic field goal with 0:10 left to lead 20–3.

The third quarter was much of the same. Texas received but wound up punting after three plays. UTSA kicked a field goal to cut the lead down 20–6. Both teams traded punts again before Spetic kicked a 23-yarder. UTSA then punted and UT turned the ball over on downs again. Entering the fourth the score stood at an unimpressive 23–6 in favor of the Horns. The directional school punted once more and Texas finally found the endzone again, after a 66-yard drive with zero pass attempts, when freshman running back Derrek Cooper went around the right end for a one-yard touchdown. UTSA punted one last time and Texas ran out the clock. During the game Texas routinely ran long-developing pass plays and crossing routes that Manning struggled to complete while UTSA successfully brought heavy blitzes that got through the Longhorns line. The offense's struggles, however, reflected the unit as a whole rather than anyone specifically. Comparatively, the defense allowed only 142 yards all night and forced turnovers on nine of eleven UTSA drives.

UTSA Roadrunners (2–0) at No. 1 Texas Longhorns (2–0) – Game summary

Quarter	1	2	3	4	Total
Roadrunners	3	0	3	0	6
No. 1 Longhorns	10	10	3	7	30

at Darrell K Royal–Texas Memorial Stadium • Austin, Texas

- Date: September 19
- Game time: 7:00 p.m.
- Game weather: Sunny • Temperature: 94 °F
- Game attendance: 103,753
- Referee: Daniel Gautreaux
- TV announcers (SECN+): Clay Matvick (play-by-play), Rocky Boiman (analyst) and Austyn Iven (sideline)

Game information

First quarter

- (13:34) TEX – Cam Coleman 24-yard pass from Arch Manning (Gianni Spetic kick), (Drive: 4 plays, 37 yards, 1:17; Texas 7–0)
- (07:05) UTSA – Michael Petro 34-yard field goal, (Drive: 13 plays, 59 yards, 6:29; Texas 7–3)
- (01:26) TEX – Gianni Spetic 52-yard field goal, (Drive: 13 plays, 50 yards, 5:35; Texas 10–3)

Second quarter

- (11:26) TEX – Cam Coleman 3-yard pass from Arch Manning (Gianni Spetic kick), (Drive: 7 plays, 57 yards, 3:19; Texas 17–3)
- (00:10) TEX – Gianni Spetic 34-yard field goal, (Drive: 8 plays, 36 yards, 1:23; Texas 20–3)

Third quarter

- (12:44) UTSA – Michael Petro 43-yard field goal, (Drive: 5 plays, 10 yards, 0:56; Texas 20–6)
- (06:07) TEX – Gianni Spetic 23-yard field goal, (Drive: 9 plays, 34 yards, 3:18; Texas 23–6)

Fourth quarter

- (07:14) TEX – Derrek Cooper 1-yard run (Gianni Spetic kick), (Drive: 8 plays, 66 yards, 3:58; Texas 30–6)

Statistics	UTSA	TEX
First downs	9	27
Plays–yards	45–142	83–400
Rushes–yards	24–72	48–228
Passing yards	70	172
Passing: comp–att–int	14–23–1	18–35–0
Turnovers	1	0
Time of possession	23:09	36:51

Team	Category	Player	Statistics
UTSA	Passing	Owen McCown	14/23, 70 yards, INT
UTSA	Rushing	Will Henderson III	10 carries, 38 yards
UTSA	Receiving	Brandon High Jr.	3 receptions, 20 yards
Texas	Passing	Arch Manning	17/33, 164 yards, 2 TD
Texas	Rushing	Hollywood Smothers	10 carries, 54 yards
Texas	Receiving	Cam Coleman	4 receptions, 59 yards, 2 TD

=== at No. 14 Tennessee ===
On September 26, the Longhorns began SEC play with a 20–17 victory over the #14 Tennessee Volunteers at Neyland Stadium. It was the first regular season meeting between the two programs and the first matchup since the 1969 Cotton Bowl Classic.

Texas received to start the game and, off the back of a 43-yard pass to Emmett Mosley V, drove 75 yards capped with a 9-yard touchdown run by Raleek Brown. Hollywood Smothers was dealing with a lower-leg injury and not play. The remainder of the first half was a low scoring affair, both offenses managing only a field goal, leaving the Longhorns ahead 10–7. The Texas offense stalled after going up, turning the ball over on six of its next seven possessions, one of which was 57-yard punt return touchdown by Tennessee's Qua Moss, but did manage another 44-yard field goal courtesy of Gianni Spetic . The defense rallied, holding the Vols to 4–16 on third downs, and allowing just 70 yards on 44 rushes. Colin Simmons alone accounted for 5.5 of the Horns 10.5 recorded sacks, breaking a UT single game sack record set in 1990 by Shane Dronett.

Raleek found the endzone again late in the fourth quarter on a 4-yard touchdown run to extend Texas' lead 20-10. Apart from penalties, the defense's only major mistake in the game came three drives later when a loose coverage allowed the Vols to score their only offensive touchdown with 1:22 minutes left. On Tennessee's ensuing successful onside kick, their kicker drop kicked the ball from behind the kicking team’s restraining line, which the SEC later admitted "should have resulted in a five-yard penalty on Tennessee and a replay of the down." The officials on the field missed this but the Texas defense held on for a 20–17 Longhorn victory. The game gained unintended off-field attention due to a series of excessive celebrations, which prompted a public apology from Texas athletic director Chris Del Conte and Simmons.

No. 1 Texas Longhorns (3–0) at No. 14 Tennessee Volunteers (3–0) – Game summary

Quarter	1	2	3	4	Total
No. 1 Longhorns	7	3	3	7	20
No. 14 Volunteers	3	0	7	7	17

at Neyland Stadium • Knoxville, Tennessee

- Date: September 26
- Game time: 11:00 a.m.
- Game weather: Clear • Temperature: 72 °F (22 °C) • Wind: S 5 mph
- Game attendance: 101,915
- Referee: Kyle Olson
- TV announcers (ABC): Chris Fowler (play-by-play), Kirk Herbstreit (analyst), Holly Rowe, and Laura Rutledge (sideline reporters)

Game information

First quarter

- (10:58) TEX – Raleek Brown 9-yard run (Gianni Spetic kick), (Drive: 7 plays, 75 yards, 4:02; Texas 7–0)
- (07:40) TEN – Cooper Ranvier 33-yard field goal, (Drive: 9 plays, 60 yards, 3:18; Texas 7–3)

Second quarter

- (14:29) TEX – Gianni Spetic 22-yard field goal, (Drive: 10 plays, 62 yards, 4:21; Texas 10–3)

Third quarter

- (11:14) TEN – Qua Moss 67-yard punt return (Cooper Ranvier kick), (Drive: 3 plays, 3 yards, 2:07; Tied 10–10)
- (09:00) TEX – Gianni Spetic 44-yard field goal, (Drive: 6 plays, 48 yards, 2:14; Texas 13–10)

Fourth quarter

- (5:41) TEX – Raleek Brown 4-yard run (Gianni Spetic kick), (Drive: 8 plays, 60 yards, 4:44; Texas 20–10)
- (1:22) TEN – Mike Matthews 30-yard pass from Faizon Brandon (Cooper Ranvier kick), (Drive: 10 plays, 80 yards, 2:45; Texas 20–17)

Statistics	TEX	TENN
First downs	14	22
Plays–yards	55–262	76–221
Rushes–yards	36–61	44–70
Passing yards	201	151
Passing: comp–att–int	14–19–1	18–32–0
Turnovers	2	0
Time of possession	28:37	31:23

Team	Category	Player	Statistics
Texas	Passing	Arch Manning	14/19, 201 yards, INT
Texas	Rushing	Raleek Brown	17 carries, 67 yards, 2 TD
Texas	Receiving	Ryan Wingo	6 receptions, 74 yards
Tennessee	Passing	Faizon Brandon	17/29, 145 yards, TD
Tennessee	Rushing	DeSean Bishop	11 carries, 34 yards
Tennessee	Receiving	Mike Matthews	4 receptions, 72 yards, TD

=== vs. Oklahoma (Red River Rivalry) ===
On October 10 the #1 Longhorns suffered one of their worst losses in the history of their rivalry with Oklahoma, losing 24–27 at the Cotton Bowl in Dallas, Texas to an unranked Sooner team despite allowing only a single offensive touchdown.

Coming into the 122nd meeting between the two teams, the Sooners were 2–2, having lost 13−41 to Georgia two weeks prior. Furthermore, in their last three contests, they had averaged just 12 points per game. Oklahoma received the kickoff to begin the game, and both teams went three-and-out on the next five consecutive drives. With 6:56 left in the first quarter, Arch Manning connected with Cam Coleman for a 41-yard touchdown pass to go up 7–0. Both teams punted back and forth again, and Oklahoma recovered a blocked punt for a touchdown to tie the game. Texas retook the lead with a 9-play, 75-yard drive capped with a 34-yard touchdown pass to Ryan Wingo. Oklahoma missed a field goal on their next drive, and Texas kicked a 23-yarder of their own to go up 17–7 before the half.

The only score in the third quarter was a 53-yard sooner field goal that narrowed Texas' lead to 17–10. The Horns punted on their first four drives of the second half. Oklahoma opened the fourth quarter with a 2-yard rushing touchdown by Lloyd Avant after a 6-play drive. Both teams punted again before Manning threw a pick-six that put Oklahoma ahead 24–17. Texas finally scored on their ensuing drive, with a 15-yard touchdown pass to Jermaine Bishop Jr. to tie the game at 24. OU punted next, but Spetic's 53-yard field goal attempt was no good; the defense forced another punt, and the Horns began to engineer a potentially game-winning drive before Manning threw another pick with 0:19 left at the OU 49-yard line. The Sooners were able to drive to get in field goal range and kick the 47-yard game winner as time expired.

Texas' defense limited Oklahoma to 238 yards, including 83 yards on the ground, 2–13 on third downs, and 13 points. Comparatively, the offense under Sarkisian was 3–14 on third downs and spotted OU a touchdown. Jeff Banks' special teams units also surrendered a score. The loss was described posthumously as inexcusable, and a reflection of Sarkisian's prolonged issues at Texas, namely the (lack of) offense efficiency and poor special teams play. When Sarkisian was asked after the game about potentially giving up play-calling duties, "Not a chance", and in response to the question of reevaluating Banks' responsibilities as special teams coach, "No", were the responses.

Oklahoma Sooners (2–2) vs. No. 1 Texas Longhorns (4–0) – Game summary

Quarter	1	2	3	4	Total
Sooners	0	7	3	17	27
No. 1 Longhorns	7	10	0	7	24

at Cotton Bowl Stadium • Dallas, Texas

- Date: October 10
- Game time: 2:30 p.m.
- Game weather: Sunny • Temperature: 86 °F (30 °C) • Wind: S at 7 miles per hour (11 km/h)
- Game attendance: 92,100
- Referee: James Carter
- TV announcers (ABC): Sean McDonough (play-by-play), Greg McElroy (analyst), and Katie George (sideline reporter)

Game information

First quarter

- (6:56) TEX ― Cam Coleman 41-yard pass from Arch Manning (Gianni Spetic kick), (Drive: 1 play, 41 yards, 0:08; TEX 7―0)

Second quarter

- (14:11) OU ― Dakoda Fields fumble recovery (Tate Sandell kick), (Drive: 4 plays, -6 yards, 2:15; Tied 7―7)
- (10:09) TEX ― Ryan Wingo 34-yard pass from Arch Manning (Gianni Septic kick), (Drive: 9 plays, 75 yards, 4:02; TEX 14―7)
- (0:12) TEX ― Gianni Spetic 23-yard field goal (Drive: 10 plays, 60 yards, 3:31; TEX 17―7)

Third quarter

- (10:56) OU ― Tate Sandell 53-yard field goal (Drive: 7 plays, 52 yards, 2:38; TEX 17―10)

Fourth quarter

- (14:48) OU ― Lloyd Avant 2-yard rush (Tate Sandell kick), (Drive: 6 plays, 47 yards, 4:00; Tied 17―17)
- (10:07) OU ― Peyton Bowen 42-yard interception return (Tate Sandell kick), (Drive: 2 plays, - 3 yards, 1:15; OU 24―17)
- (6:32) TEX ― Jermaine Bishop Jr. 15-yard pass from Arch Manning (Gianni Spetic kick), (Drive: 7 plays, 75 yards, 3:35; Tied 24―24)
- (0:00) OU ― Tate Sandell 47-yard field goal (Drive: 4 plays, 31 yards, 0:19; OU 27―24)

Statistics	OU	TEX
First downs	14	16
Plays–yards	57–238	63–382
Rushes–yards	31–83	32–122
Passing yards	155	260
Passing: comp–att–int	18–26–0	19–31–2
Turnovers	0	2
Time of possession	30:31	29:29

Team	Category	Player	Statistics
Oklahoma	Passing	John Mateer	18/26, 155 yards
Oklahoma	Rushing	Lloyd Avant	10 carries, 72 yards, TD
Oklahoma	Receiving	Isaiah Sategna III	5 receptions, 64 yards
Texas	Passing	Arch Manning	19/31, 260 yards, 3 TD, 2 INT
Texas	Rushing	Derrek Cooper	8 carries, 41 yards
Texas	Receiving	Cam Coleman	5 receptions, 110 yards, TD

=== vs Florida ===
On October 17, the Longhorns returned home to DKR, where they were upset by the Florida Gators 24–27. Similar to the game a week before against OU, the offense underperformed, this time against the statistically worst defense in the SEC.

Texas won the toss but elected to receive the ball. The scripted first drive ended in a 32-yard touchdown run by Raleek Brown. The Texas defense then forced a three-and-out, and Gianni Spetic kicked a 38-yard field goal to extend Texas' lead to 10–0. Both teams punted on their next possessions before the Gators kicked a field goal of their own. Florida's next punt was returned 63 yards by Ryan Niblett for a touchdown and a 17–3 lead. Florida was forced to punt again, but on Texas' ensuing drive Sarkisian elected to go for it on 4th & 1 from the 50-yard line with 2:44 minutes left in the game. Hollywood Smothers was tackled for a loss, and Florida used the momentum to drive for a touchdown to end the half. The score stood Texas 17–10.

Because Texas decided to receive in the first half, Florida got the ball to begin the second with an opportunity to tie the game. Florida achieved this after a 8:03 minute long, 69-yard drive against a beleaguered defense. With ten minutes left in the fourth, the Gators took their first lead of the game on a 28-yard field goal. Texas failed to convert another fourth & short, this time from their own 48-yardline. Florida scored a touchdown on their next possession to extend their lead to 27–17 with 6:22 left. The Horns finally found the endzone on a 9-yard touchdown pass from Arch Manning to Cam Coleman and forced another Gators punt with 2:32 left. Arch Manning fumbled the ball away on the next drive to seal the game for Florida.

Florida Gators (4–2) at No. 7 Texas Longhorns (4–1) – Game summary

Quarter	1	2	3	4	Total
Gators	0	10	7	10	27
No. 7 Longhorns	10	7	0	7	24

at Darrell K Royal–Texas Memorial Stadium • Austin, Texas

- Date: October 17
- Game time: 11:00 a.m.
- Game weather: Sunny • Temperature: 59 °F (15 °C) • Wind: NNE at 7 miles per hour (11 km/h)
- Game attendance: 103,989
- Referee: David Smith
- TV announcers (ABC): Joe Tessitore (play-by-play), Jesse Palmer (analyst), and Kris Budden (sideline reporter)

Game information

First quarter

- (11:42) TEX — Raleek Brown 32-yard run (Gianni Spetic kick), (Drive: 7 plays, 75 yards, 3:18; TEX 7-0)
- (6:42) TEX — Gianni Spetic 38-yard field goal (Drive: 8 plays, 60 yards, 2:52; TEX 10-0)

Second quarter

- (13:48) FLA — Patrick Durkin 45-yard field goal (Drive: 8 plays, 37 yards, 3:47; TEX 10-3)
- (11:27) TEX — Ryan Niblett 63-yard punt return (Gianni Spetic kick), (Drive: 3 plays, -1 yard, 1:06; TEX 17-3)
- (0:18) FLA — Lacota Dippre 7-yard pass from Tramell Jones (Patrick Durkin kick), (Drive: 9 plays, 49 yards, 2:26; TEX 17-10)

Third quarter

- (6:50) FLA — Lacota Dippre 8-yard pass from Tramell Jones Jr. (Patrick Durkin kick), (Drive: 15 plays, 69 yards, 8:03; Tied 17-17)

Fourth quarter

- (10:40) FLA — Patrick Durkin 28-yard field goal (Drive: 14 plays, 57 yards, 6:31; FLA 20-17)
- (6:22) FLA — Jadan Baugh 11-yard run (Patrick Durkin kick), (Drive: 6 plays, 45 yards, 2:08; FLA 27-17)
- (4:21) TEX — Cam Coleman 9-yard pass from Arch Manning (Gianni Spetic kick), (Drive: 6 plays, 75 yards, 2:01; FLA 27-24)

Statistics	FLA	TEX
First downs	21	13
Plays–yards	81–313	50–272
Rushes–yards	46–158	30–99
Passing yards	155	173
Passing: comp–att–int	22–35–0	14–20–0
Turnovers	0	1
Time of possession	38:11	21:49

Team	Category	Player	Statistics
Florida	Passing	Tramell Jones	22/35, 155 yards, 2 TD
Florida	Rushing	Jadan Baugh	25 carries, 91 yards, TD
Florida	Receiving	Eric Singleton Jr.	7 receptions, 43 yards
Texas	Passing	Arch Manning	14/20, 173 yards, TD
Texas	Rushing	Hollywood Smothers	12 carries, 52 yards
Texas	Receiving	Emmett Mosley V	2 receptions, 76 yards

=== vs No. 7 Ole Miss ===
On October 24 the Longhorns snapped their two game losing streak with a 34–27 victory over the 7th-ranked Ole Miss Rebels in Austin. Quarterback Arch Manning threw for 212 yards and a touchdown pass to Ryan Wingo, while adding two rushing touchdowns of his own, which included the go-ahead score in the fourth quarter. Raleek Brown also rushed for 157 yards on 23 carries. Texas jumped out to a 24–3 lead by halftime but Ole Miss responded with 24 unanswered points. Texas finally answered late in the fourth quarter with a touchdown drive and a field goal drive to extend their lead 34–24. Ole Miss kicked a field goal with 1:22 left and successfully converted their onside kick attempt, but Trinidad Chambliss' hail mary attempt was intercepted by Jelani McDonald in endzone to seal the victory for the Horns. Texas rose to #11 in the ensuing AP Poll after the win. Trevor Goosby was injured during the game and would miss the remainder of the season.

No. 7 Ole Miss Rebels (5–1) at No. 19 Texas Longhorns (4–2) – Game summary

Quarter	1	2	3	4	Total
No. 7 Rebels	3	0	14	10	27
No. 19 Longhorns	10	14	0	10	34

at Darrell K Royal–Texas Memorial Stadium • Austin, Texas

- Date: October 24
- Game time: 6:30 PM
- Game weather: Sunny • Temperature: 82 °F (28 °C)
- Game attendance: 104,306
- Referee: Daniel Gautreaux
- TV announcers (ABC): Chris Fowler (play-by-play), Kirk Herbstreit (analyst) and Holly Rowe (sideline reporter)

Game information

First quarter

- (8:27) TEX — Gianni Spetic 23-yard field goal (Drive: 12 plays, 69 yards, 5:51; TEX 3-0)
- (6:01) MISS — Lucas Carneiro 46-yard field goal (Drive: 7 plays, 46 yards, 2:26; Tied 3-3)
- (0:55) TEX — Arch Manning 2-yard run (Gianni Spetic kick), (Drive: 4 plays, 60 yards, 1:24; TEX 10-3)

Second quarter

- (12:38) TEX — Ryan Wingo 50-yard pass from Arch Manning (Gianni Spetic kick), (Drive: 5 plays, 61 yards, 1:57; TEX 17-3)
- (9:21) TEX — Michael Terry III 2-yard run (Gianni Spetic kick), (Drive: 6 plays, 62 yards, 2:22; TEX 24-3)

Third quarter

- (13:19) MISS — Kam Franklin 0-yard fumble recovery (Lucas Carneiro kick), (Drive: 4 plays, 12 yards, 1:41; TEX 24-10)
- (6:46) MISS — Horatio Fields 6-yard pass from Trinidad Chambliss (Lucas Carneiro kick), (Drive: 10 plays, 80 yards, 4:38; TEX 24-17)

Fourth quarter

- (13:57) MISS — Horatio Fields 27-yard pass from Trinidad Chambliss (Lucas Carneiro kick), (Drive: 4 plays, 71 yards, 1:13; Tied 24-24)
- (8:04) TEX — Arch Manning 1-yard run (Gianni Spetic kick), (Drive: 6 plays, 80 yards, 3:19; TEX 31-24)
- (2:25) TEX — Gianni Spetic 33-yard field goal (Drive: 8 plays, 44 yards, 3:56; TEX 34-24)
- (1:22) MISS — Lucas Carneiro 39-yard field goal (Drive: 6 plays, 53 yards, 1:03; TEX 34-27)

Statistics	MISS	TEX
First downs	23	23
Plays–yards	82–363	72–419
Rushes–yards	30–113	42–207
Passing yards	250	212
Passing: comp–att–int	25–52–3	18–30–2
Turnovers	3	3
Time of possession	25:03	34:57

Team	Category	Player	Statistics
Ole Miss	Passing	Trinidad Chambliss	25/52, 250 yards, 2 TD, 3 INT
Ole Miss	Rushing	Makhi Frazier	6 carries, 47 yards
Ole Miss	Receiving	Deuce Alexander	8 receptions, 87 yards
Texas	Passing	Arch Manning	18/30, 212 yards, TD, 2 INT
Texas	Rushing	Raleek Brown	23 carries, 157 yards
Texas	Receiving	Ryan Wingo	7 receptions, 111 yards, TD

=== vs Mississippi State ===
Mississippi State Bulldogs (4–3) at No. 11 Texas Longhorns (5–2) – Game summary

Quarter	1	2	3	4	Total
Bulldogs	0	0	3	0	3
No. 11 Longhorns	7	10	7	7	31

at Darrell K Royal–Texas Memorial Stadium • Austin, Texas

- Date: October 31
- Game time: 6:30 p.m.
- Game weather: Sunny • Temperature: 77 °F (25 °C) • Wind: E at 1 mile per hour (1.6 km/h)
- Game attendance: 103,586
- Referee: Kyle Olson
- TV announcers (ESPN): Joe Tessiore (play-by-play), Jesse Palmer (analyst) and Kris Budden (sideline reporter)

Game information

First quarter

- (12:59) TEX — Cam Coleman 14-yard pass from Arch Manning (Gianni Spetic kick), (Drive: 4 plays, 62 yards, 1:55; TEX 7-0)

Second quarter

- (5:41) TEX — Gianni Spetic 45-yard field goal (Drive: 13 plays, 52 yards, 6:51; TEX 10-0)
- (1:13) TEX — Maraad Watson 61-yard fumble return (Gianni Spetic kick), (Drive: 4 plays, 7 yards, 0:30; TEX 17-0)

Third quarter

- (8:58) MISS — Kyle Ferrie 30-yard field goal (Drive: 6 plays, 16 yards, 2:53; TEX 17-3)
- (5:35) TEX — Raleek Brown 4-yard pass from Arch Manning (Gianni Spetic kick), (Drive: 7 plays, 75 yards, 3:23; TEX 24-3)

Fourth quarter

- (7:56) TEX — Emmett Mosley V 42-yard pass from Arch Manning (Gianni Spetic kick), (Drive: 5 plays, 62 yards, 2:23; TEX 31-3)

Statistics	MSST	TEX
First downs	12	13
Plays–yards	67–187	53–280
Rushes–yards	41–68	32–60
Passing yards	119	220
Passing: comp–att–int	15–25–0	17–21–0
Turnovers	1	1
Time of possession	32:28	27:32

Team	Category	Player	Statistics
Mississippi State	Passing	AJ Swann	12/15, 97 yards
Mississippi State	Rushing	Fluff Bothwell	17 carries, 49 yards
Mississippi State	Receiving	Marquis Johnson	6 receptions, 61 yards
Texas	Passing	Arch Manning	16/20, 220 yards, 3 TD
Texas	Rushing	Raleek Brown	8 carries, 30 yards
Texas	Receiving	Emmett Mosley V	4 receptions, 98 yards, TD

=== at No. 18 Missouri ===
Arch Manning makes a play during the game

No. 7 Texas Longhorns (6–2) at No. 18 Missouri Tigers (6–2) – Game summary

Quarter	1	2	3	4	Total
No. 7 Longhorns	7	3	10	14	34
No. 18 Tigers	10	0	10	0	20

at Faurot Field • Columbia, Missouri

- Date: November 7
- Game time: 11:00 a.m.
- Game weather: Cloudy • Temperature: 44 °F (7 °C) • Wind: NW at 3 miles per hour (4.8 km/h)
- Game attendance: 63,690
- Referee: David Smith
- TV announcers (ESPN): Joe Tessiore (play-by-play), Jesse Palmer (analyst) and Kris Budden (sideline reporter)

Game information

First quarter

- (8:40) MIZ — Brett Norfleet 2-yard pass from Austin Simmons (Blake Craig kick), (Drive: 7 plays, 68 yards, 3:22; MIZ 7-0)
- (6:10) TEX — Derrek Cooper 24-yard pass from Arch Manning (Gianni Spetic kick), (Drive: 7 plays, 65 yards, 2:30; Tied 7-7)
- (1:06) MIZ — Blake Craig 22-yard field goal (Drive: 9 plays, 43 yards, 3:07; MIZ 10-7)

Second quarter

- (1:57) TEX — Gianni Spetic 27-yard field goal (Drive: 6 plays, 30 yards, 3:14; Tied 10-10)

Third quarter

- (11:51) MIZ — Blake Craig 48-yard field goal (Drive: 7 plays, 36 yards, 3:09; MIZ 13-10)
- (5:41) TEX — Gianni Spetic 34-yard field goal (Drive: 10 plays, 56 yards, 5:08; Tied 13-13)
- (4:52) MIZ — Naeshaun Montgomery 72-yard pass from Austin Simmons (Blake Craig kick), (Drive: 2 plays, 75 yards, 0:49; MIZ 20-13)
- (1:52) TEX — Jermaine Bishop Jr. 25-yard pass from Arch Manning (Gianni Spetic kick), (Drive: 9 plays, 75 yards, 3:00; Tied 20-20)

Fourth quarter

- (5:03) TEX — Raleek Brown 23-yard pass from Arch Manning (Gianni Spetic kick), (Drive: 6 plays, 54 yards, 2:53; TEX 27-20)
- (1:25) TEX — Raleek Brown 8-yard run (Gianni Spetic kick), (Drive: 3 plays, 6 yards, 0:16; TEX 34-20)

Statistics	TEX	MIZ
First downs	21	17
Plays–yards	69–401	68–336
Rushes–yards	31–104	24–84
Passing yards	297	252
Passing: comp–att–int	28–38–0	23–44–0
Turnovers	2	1
Time of possession	32:26	27:34

Team	Category	Player	Statistics
Texas	Passing	Arch Manning	28/38, 297 yards, 3 TD
Texas	Rushing	Raleek Brown	17 carries, 85 yards, TD
Texas	Receiving	Emmett Mosley V	5 receptions, 85 yards
Missouri	Passing	Austin Simmons	23/43, 252 yards, 2 TD
Missouri	Rushing	Jamal Roberts	19 carries, 66 yards
Missouri	Receiving	Naeshaun Montgomery	2 receptions, 81 yards, TD

=== at No. 21 LSU ===
No. 6 Texas Longhorns (7–2) at No. 21 LSU Tigers (6–3) – Game summary

Quarter	1	2	3	4	Total
No. 6 Longhorns	7	3	3	9	22
No. 21 Tigers	7	7	7	0	21

at Tiger Stadium • Baton Rouge, Louisiana

- Date: November 14
- Game time: 6:30 p.m.
- Game weather: Cloudy • Temperature: 57 °F (14 °C) • Wind: NE at 7 miles per hour (11 km/h)
- Game attendance: 102,321
- Referee: Steve Marlowe
- TV announcers (ABC): Chris Fowler (play-by-play), Kirk Herbstreit (analyst), and Holly Rowe (sideline reporter)

Game information

First quarter

- (10:31) TEX – Arch Manning 1-yard run, Gianni Spetic kick (Drive: 11 plays, 75 yards, 4:29; Texas 7–0)
- (5:16) LSU – Jackson Harris 10-yard pass from Sam Leavitt, Scott Starzyk kick (Drive: 13 plays, 75 yards, 5:15; Tied 7–7)

Second quarter

- (9:17) LSU – Jackson Harris 9-yard pass from Sam Leavitt, Scott Starzyk kick (Drive: 2 plays, 7 yards, 0:41; LSU 14–7)
- (3:22) TEX – Gianni Spetic 42-yard field goal (Drive: 12 plays, 50 yards, 5:55; LSU 14–10)

Third quarter

- (5:52) LSU – Dilin Jones 44-yard run, Scott Starzyk kick (Drive: 7 plays, 72 yards, 2:58; LSU 21–10)
- (1:35) TEX – Gianni Spetic 41-yard field goal (Drive: 8 plays, 48 yards, 4:10; LSU 21–13)

Fourth quarter

- (11:37) TEX – Gianni Spetic 50-yard field goal (Drive: 6 plays, 21 yards, 2:34; LSU 21–16)
- (0:03) TEX – Raleek Brown 4-yard pass from Arch Manning (Drive: 12 plays, 58 yards, 2:16; Texas 22–21)

Statistics	TEX	LSU
First downs	20	19
Plays–yards	67–273	67–366
Rushes–yards	32–99	30–122
Passing yards	174	244
Passing: comp–att–int	19–35–3	27–37–3
Turnovers	3	3
Time of possession	29:38	30:22

Team	Category	Player	Statistics
Texas	Passing	Arch Manning	19/35, 174 yards, TD, 3 INT
Texas	Rushing	Arch Manning	12 carries, 35 yards, TD
Texas	Receiving	Ryan Wingo	6 receptions, 68 yards
LSU	Passing	Sam Leavitt	27/37, 244 yards, 2 TD, 3 INT
LSU	Rushing	Dilin Jones	19 carries, 125 yards, TD
LSU	Receiving	Eugene Wilson III	7 receptions, 96 yards

=== vs Arkansas (rivalry) ===
Arkansas Razorbacks (4–6) at No. 5 Texas Longhorns (8–2) – Game summary

Quarter	1	2	3	4	Total
Razorbacks	3	0	0	0	3
No. 5 Longhorns	14	17	7	7	45

at Darrell K Royal–Texas Memorial Stadium • Austin, Texas

- Date: November 21
- Game time: 2:30 p.m.
- Game weather: Cloudy • Temperature: 73 °F (23 °C) • Wind: SE at 4 miles per hour (6.4 km/h)
- Game attendance: 103,508
- Referee: James Carter
- TV announcers (ESPN): Dave Pasch (play-by-play), Dusty Dvoracek (analyst), and Taylor McGregor (sideline reporter)

Game information

First quarter
Second quarter
Third quarter
Fourth quarter

Statistics	ARK	TEX
First downs	20	21
Plays–yards	71-363	58-448
Rushes–yards	33-110	30-116
Passing yards	253	332
Passing: comp–att–int	21-38-2	24-28-0
Turnovers	2	0
Time of possession	31:21	28:39

Team	Category	Player	Statistics
Arkansas	Passing	KJ Jackson	15/28, 190 yards, INT
Arkansas	Rushing	Cam Settles	14 carries, 64 yards
Arkansas	Receiving	Chris Marshall (American football)	9 receptions, 106 yards
Texas	Passing	Arch Manning	21/25, 287 yards, 2 TD's
Texas	Rushing	Michael Terry III	7 carries, 32 yards, TD
Texas	Receiving	Emmett Mosley V	8 receptions, 106 yards, TD

=== at Texas A&M (Lone Star Showdown) ===
Texas Longhorns (0–0) at Texas A&M Aggies (0–0) – Game summary

Quarter	1	2	3	4	Total
Longhorns	0	0	0	0	0
Aggies	0	0	0	0	0

at Kyle Field • College Station, Texas

- Date: November 27
- Game time: 6:30 PM
- TV: ABC

Game information

First quarter
Second quarter
Third quarter
Fourth quarter

Statistics	TEX	TAMU
First downs		
Plays–yards		
Rushes–yards		
Passing yards		
Passing: comp–att–int		
Turnovers		
Time of possession		

Team	Category	Player	Statistics
Texas	Passing		
Texas	Rushing		
Texas	Receiving		
Texas A&M	Passing		
Texas A&M	Rushing		
Texas A&M	Receiving		

== Personnel ==
=== Coaching staff ===
2026 Texas coaches

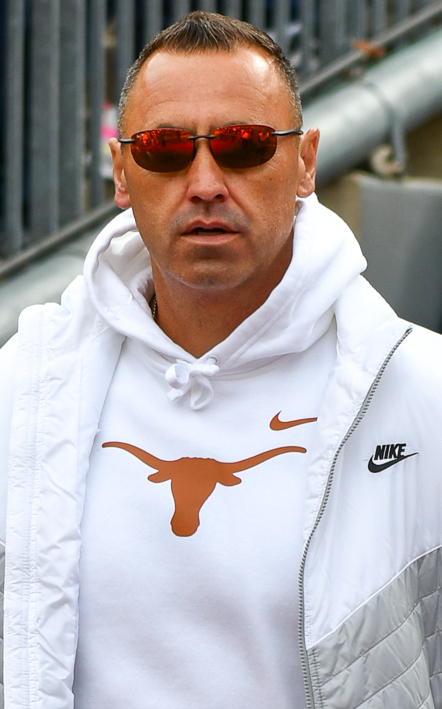
HC Steve Sarkisian

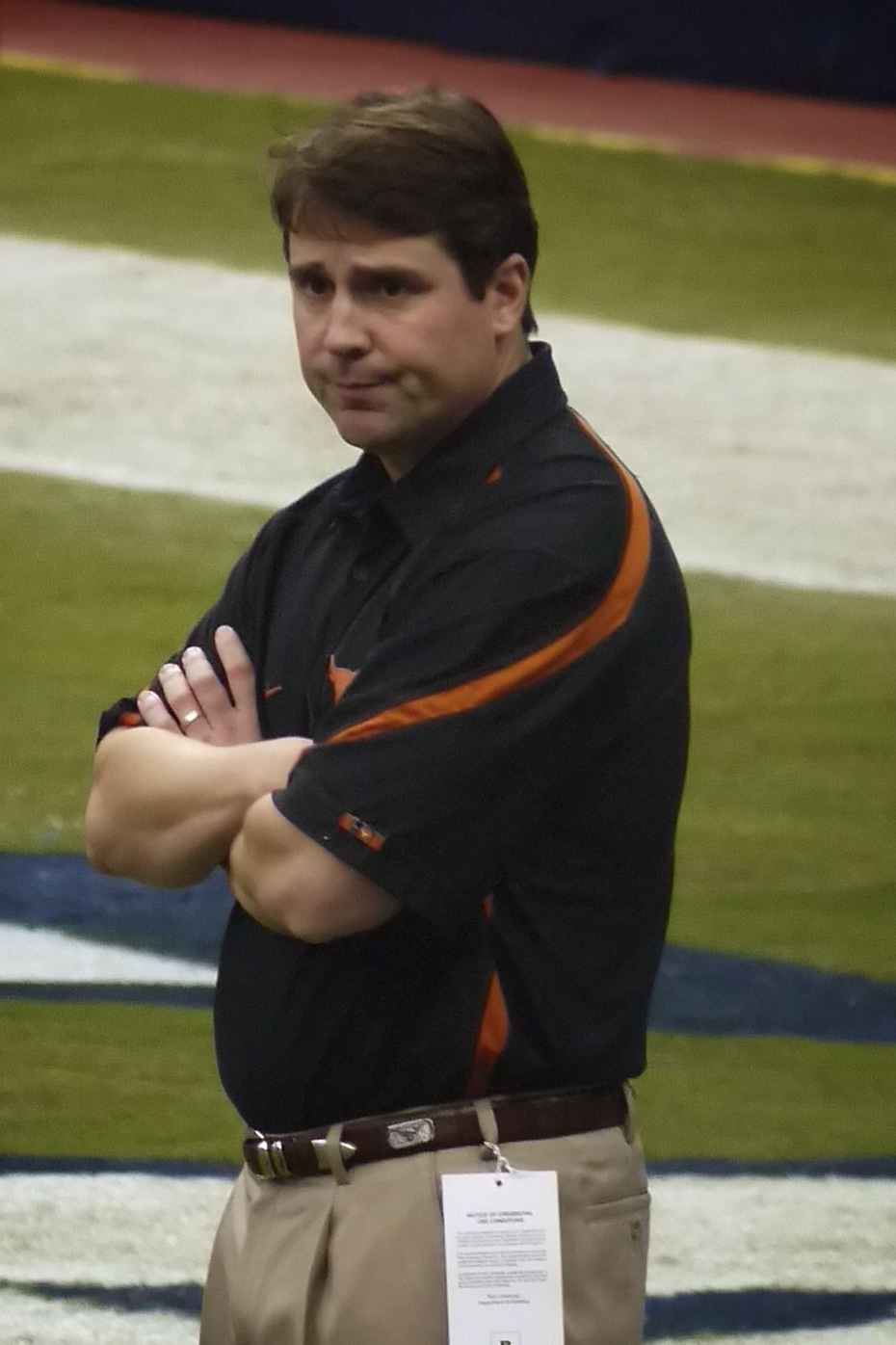
DC Will Muschamp

Steve Sarkisian will be in his sixth year as the Longhorns' head coach during the 2026 season. In his previous five seasons with Texas, he has lead the Longhorns to an overall record of 48 wins and 20 losses (.706), including two CFP appearances, two bowl wins, and one Big 12 championship. On December 9, 2025 running backs coach Chad Scott (now at North Texas) was released and replaced on December 12 by Jabbar Juluke. On December 18, 2025 Sarkisian fired defensive coordinator Pete Kwiatkowski along with defensive passing game coordinator Duane Akina, replacing them with Will Muschamp and Blake Gideon respectively. Kwiatkowski joined the Arizona Cardinals on February 18 as defensive line coach and Akina was hired by Kansas on June 9 as a nickels coach. Nickels coach Keynodo Hudson was also released in the offseason.

Name	Position	Alma Mater	Years at Texas
Steve Sarkisian	Head coach	BYU (1997)	6th
Kenny Baker	Assistant coach, defensive line	Gardner–Webb (2009)	3rd
Jeff Banks	Assistant coach, special teams coordinator / TEs	Washington State (1999)	6th
Michael Bimonte	Assistant coach, co-passing game coordinator / assistant QB	Rutgers (2015)	6th
LaAllan Clark	Assistant coach, edge	Grambling State (2018)	2nd
Kyle Flood	Assistant coach, offensive coordinator / OL	Iona College (1993)	6th
Blake Gideon	Assistant coach, defensive passing game coordinator / secondary	University of Texas (2011)	5th (Note: 2021–2024, 2026–present)
Chris Jackson	Assistant coach, passing game coordinator / WR	Washington State (1997)	4th
Jabbar Juluke	Assistant coach, running backs	Southern University (1999)	1st
A. J. Milwee	Assistant coach, co-offensive coordinator / QB	North Alabama (2009)	6th
Will Muschamp	Assistant coach, defensive coordinator	University of Georgia (1994)	1st
Johnny Nansen	Assistant coach, co-defensive coordinator / inside linebackers	Washington State (1997)	3rd
Mark Orphey	Assistant coach, cornerbacks	Texas Southern (2010)	2nd
Torre Becton	Director of football performance	North Carolina A&T State (2000)	6th

Coaching staff additions in italics

=== Roster ===
2026 Texas Longhorns football team roster
Players
Coaches
Offense

Pos.	#	Name	Class
RB	0	Raleek Brown	Sr
WR	1	Ryan Wingo	Jr
RB	2	Hollywood Smothers	Jr
WR	3	Emmett Mosley V	Jr
WR	4	Jermaine Bishop Jr.	Fr
RB	5	Derrek Cooper	Fr
QB	6	Dia Bell	Fr
WR	7	Kaliq Lockett	Fr
WR	8	Cam Coleman	Jr
QB	9	Karle "KJ" Lacey Jr.	Fr
RB	11	Michael Terry III	Fr
WR	13	Kohen Brown	Fr
WR	14	Chris Stewart	Fr
TE	15	Michael Masunas	Sr
QB	16	Arch Manning	Jr
WR	17	Daylan McCutcheon	So
WR	18	Sterling Berkhalter	Sr
QB	19	MJ Morris	Sr
RB/WR	21	Ryan Niblett	Jr
QB	25	Luke Dunham	So
RB	28	Jett Walker	Fr
RB	31	James Simon	Fr
RB	33	Carson Berger	Jr
WR	35	Rett Andersen	Sr
WR	39	Evan Enderlin	Fr
TE	48	Bryce Chambers	Sr
OL	50	Laurence Seymore	Sr
OL	51	John Turntine III	Fr
OL	54	Cole Hutson	5th
OL	56	Dylan Sikorski	So
OL	58	Devin Coleman	Fr
OL	62	Connor Robertson	Sr
OL	64	Robert Sweeney	Sr
OL	68	Paris Patterson	Jr
OL	69	Brooks Kieschnick Jr.	Sr
OL	70	Kaden Scherer	Fr
OL	71	Melvin Siani	Jr
OL	72	Nicholas Robertson	Fr
OL	73	Brandon Baker	Jr
OL	74	Trevor Goosby	Jr
OL	75	Jaydon Chatman	Jr
OL	76	Jackson Christian	Fr
OL	77	Andre Cojoe	So
OL	78	Jordan Coleman	Fr
OL	79	Jonte Newman	Fr
TE	81	Nick Townsend	So
TE	82	Ridge Barker	Jr
TE	83	Spencer Shannon	Jr
TE	85	Emaree Winston	So
WR	86	Hudson Powell	Jr
TE	87	Will Randle	Jr
TE	88	Charlie Jilek	Fr
WR	89	Ty Boatright	Sr

Defense

Pos.	#	Name	Class
CB	0	John Meredith III	Fr
EDGE	1	Colin Simmons	Jr
DB	2	Derek Williams Jr.	Jr
LB	3	Rasheem Biles	Sr
DB	4	Jelani McDonald	Sr
DB	5	Bo Mascoe	Jr
DB	6	Kobe Black	Jr
DB	8	Kade Phillips	So
DB	9	Jonah Williams	So
DB	11	Samari Matthews	Fr
DB	13	Zelus Hicks	Fr
EDGE/LB	14	Brad Spence	Sr
DL	15	Justus Terry	So
LB	16	Tyler Atkinson	Fr
DB	17	Xavier Filsaime	Jr
LB	18	Kosi Okpala	Fr
EDGE	19	Zina Umeozulu	So
DB	21	Hayward Howard Jr.	Fr
DB	23	Jordon Johnson-Rubell	Jr
DB	24	Warren Roberson	Jr
DB	25	Toray Davis	Fr
DB	27	Wardell Mack	So
LB	28	Justin Cryer	Sr
DB	29	Graceson Littleton	So
LB	30	Rocky Cummings	Fr
DB	31	Yaheim Riley	Fr
LB	32	Brady Sarkisian	Sr
DL	33	Myron Charles	Fr
DB	35	McCoy Bruce	Jr
DB	36	Nick Hudson	Sr
LB	37	Jonathan Cunningham	Fr
EDGE	40	Lance Jackson	So
DB	41	Ziky Umeozulu	So
LB	43	Eric Garza	Jr
LB	44	Markus Boswell	So
LB	45	Darius Snow	Sr
EDGE	46	Smith Orogbo	Fr
DB	48	Jackson Duffey	Jr
DL	52	James Johnson	Fr
DL	53	Isaiah Coleman	Fr
DL	55	Elijah Ali	Fr
EDGE	80	Brinley Tita	Fr
DL	88	Maraad Watson	Jr
DL	90	Josiah Sharma	Fr
EDGE	92	Colton Vasek	Jr
DL	93	Hero Kanu	Sr
EDGE	94	Jamarion Carlton	Fr
DL	95	Ian Geffrard	Jr
DL	96	Zion Williams	Fr
DL	97	Alex January	Jr
EDGE	99	Richard Wesley	Fr

Special teams

Pos.	#	Name	Class
LS	42	Trott O'Neal	Fr
P	43	Mac Chiumento	Sr
K	44	Gianni Spetic	Sr
P	45	Mikey Bukauskas	Fr
K	46	Spencer Barnett	So
LS	47	Trey DuBuc	Jr
K	49	Jake Collett	Fr

Head coach

- Steve Sarkisian

Coordinators/assistant coaches

- Jeff Banks – Special teams coordinator / tight ends
- Kyle Flood – Offensive coordinator/offensive line
- A. J. Milwee – Co-offensive coordinator/quarterbacks
- Jabbar Juluke – Associate head coach (offense)/running backs
- Will Muschamp – Defensive coordinator
- Johnny Nansen – Co-defensive coordinator/linebackers
- Chris Jackson – Passing game coordinator/wide receivers
- Michael Bimonte – Co-passing game coordinator/assistant quarterbacks
- Blake Gideon – Defensive passing game coordinator/secondary
- Kenny Baker – Defensive line
- LaAllan Clark – EDGE
- Mark Orphey – Cornerbacks
- Jason McEndoo – Senior Analyst (OL)
- Kwahn Drake – Senior Analyst (DL)
- Garrett Cox – Senior Analyst (LB)
- Malik Antoine – Senior Analyst (SAF)
- Matt Moran – Senior Analyst (SPT)
- Billy Gonzales – Analyst (WR)
- Steve Casula – Analyst (TE)
- J.B. Brown – Analyst (SPT)
- Jackson Ponder – Analyst (QB)

Legend

- (C) Team captain
- (S) Suspended
- (I) Ineligible
- Injured
- Redshirt

Roster
Last update: July 22, 2026

=== Depth chart ===
Defense

NB
Graceson Littleton
Xavier Filsaime
Jonathan Cunningham

FS
Kobe Black
Derek Williams Jr.
Xavier Filsaime

WLB	SLB
Rasheem Biles	Brad Spence
Kosi Okpala	Colton Vasek
Tyler Atkinson	Kosi Okpala

SS
Jelani McDonald
Jonah Williams
Zelus Hicks

CB
Kade Phillips
Samari Matthews
Wardell Mack

DE	DT	DT	DE
Lance Jackson	Hero Kanu	Maraad Watson	Colin Simmons
Zina Umeozulu	Justus Terry	Alex January	Richard Wesley
Jamarion Carlton	Josiah Sharma	Ian Geffrard	Smith Orogbo

CB
Bo Mascoe
Warren Roberson
Hayward Howard Jr.

Offense

WR (H)
Emmett Mosley V
Daylan McCutcheon
Jermaine Bishop Jr.

WR (X)
Ryan Wingo
Kaliq Lockett
Chris Stewart

LT	LG	C	RG	RT
Trevor Goosby	Dylan Sikorski	Connor Robertson	Brandon Baker	Melvin Siani
Andre Cojoe	Laurence Seymore III	Jackson Christian	Devin Coleman	Jonte Newman
Jordan Coleman	Cole Hutson	Cole Hutson	Jaydon Chatman	Andre Cojoe

TE
Nick Townsend
Spencer Shannon
Michael Masunas

WR (Y)
Cam Coleman
Sterling Berkhalter
Kohen Brown

QB
Arch Manning
KJ Lacey Jr.
Dia Bell

RB
Hollywood Smothers
Raleek Brown
Derrek Cooper

Special teams
PK Gianni Spetic
PK Jake Collett
P Mac Chiumento
P Mikey Bukauskas
KR Ryan Niblett
PR Ryan Niblett
LS Trey Dubuc
H Mac Chiumento

== Awards and honors ==
=== SEC honors ===
Weekly SEC honors
Honors	Player	Position	Date Awarded	Ref.
Co-Defensive Player of the Week	Rasheem Biles	LB	September 7, 2026	
Co-Offensive Player of the Week	Arch Manning	QB	September 14, 2026	
Co-Offensive Lineman of the Week	Trevor Goosby	OL	September 14, 2026	
Co-Defensive Player of the Week	Rasheem Biles	LB	October 26, 2026	
Co-Defensive Player of the Week	Rasheem Biles	LB	November 2, 2026	
Co-Defensive Lineman of the Week	Maraad Watson	DL	November 2, 2026	
Offensive Player of the Week	Arch Manning	QB	November 9, 2026	
Defensive Player of the Week	Jelani McDonald	DB	November 16, 2026	
Co-Special Teams Player of the Week	Gianni Spetic	K	November 16, 2026	

=== National honors ===
Weekly national honors
Honors	Player	Position	Date Awarded	Ref.
Paul Hornung Award	Hollywood Smothers	RB	September 15, 2026	
Outland Trophy	Trevor Goosby	OL	September 15, 2026	
Chuck Bednarik Award	Colin Simmons	EDGE	September 29, 2026	
Bronko Nagurski Trophy	Colin Simmons	EDGE	September 29, 2026	
Walter Camp Award	Colin Simmons	EDGE	September 29, 2026	
Chuck Bednarik Award	Rasheem Biles	LB	November 4, 2026	
Lott Trophy	Rasheem Biles	LB	November 4, 2026	
Jim Thorpe Award	Jelani McDonald	DB	November 17, 2026	
Chuck Bednarik Award	Jelani McDonald	DB	November 17, 2026	
Walter Camp Award	Jelani McDonald	DB	November 17, 2026	
AP National Player of the Week	Jelani McDonald	DB	November 17, 2026	
