= WRHS =

WRHS may refer to:

== High schools ==
- Wachusett Regional High School, in Holden, Massachusetts
- Wahconah Regional High School, in Dalton, Massachusetts
- Warner Robins High School, in Warner Robins, Georgia
- Washburn Rural High School, in Topeka, Kansas, United States
- West Ranch High School, in Stevenson Ranch, California
- West Roxbury High School in Boston, Massachusetts
- Woodland Regional High School, in Beacon Falls, Connecticut
- Wheat Ridge High School, in Wheat Ridge, Colorado
- Whalley Range High School, in Manchester, England
- Wiregrass Ranch High School, in Wesley Chapel, Florida

== Other ==
- WRHS (FM), a radio station in Grasonville, Maryland, United States
- Western Reserve Historical Society, in Cleveland, Ohio
