= Brandon Baker (disambiguation) =

Brandon Baker may refer to:

- Brandon Baker (born 1984), American actor
- Brandon Baker (American football), American football player
- Brandon Stirling Baker, American lighting designer
- Brandon Baker (racing driver), race car driver at the 1987 Holly Farms 400
