= John Meredith III =

American college football player

No. 0 – Texas Longhorns
- Position: Cornerback
- Class: Freshman

Personal information
- Listed height: 6 ft 2 in (1.88 m)
- Listed weight: 190 lb (86 kg)

Career information
- High school: Trinity (Euless, Texas)
- College: Texas (2026–present)

John Meredith III is an American college football cornerback for the Texas Longhorns.

== Early life ==
Meredith is from Fort Worth, Texas. He grew up playing football and first attended Trinity High School in Euless, where he competed in football and track and field. After growing up playing football at quarterback and safety, he began focusing on playing defense as a high school freshman. As a freshman track athlete, he recorded a 44-1.5 mark in the triple jump, and the following year he posted a 21.74-second time in the 200 metres. In football, Meredith was the 4-6A Defensive Newcomer of the Year in 2024 before being selected first-team all-district and earning selection to the Under Armour All-American Game as a junior.

Meredith transferred to North Crowley High School for his senior year in 2026. However, in June 2026, the 11-6A district executive committee decided by a 5-2 vote that he was ineligible to play at North Crowley due to "transferring for athletic purposes".

== College career ==
A consensus five-star recruit, Meredith committed to play college football for the Texas Longhorns in June 2026. Following his high school ineligibility ruling, Meredith announced on July 23, 2026, that he would reclassify from the class of 2027 to the class of 2026 to enroll early at Texas for the 2026 season.
