= Bo Mascoe =

American football player

No. 5 – Texas Longhorns
- Position: Cornerback
- Class: Senior

Personal information
- Listed height: 5 ft 11 in (1.80 m)
- Listed weight: 199 lb (90 kg)

Career information
- High school: Osceola (Kissimmee, Florida)
- College: Rutgers (2023–2025); Texas (2026–present)
- Stats at ESPN

Bo Mascoe is an American college football cornerback for the Texas Longhorns. He previously played for the Rutgers Scarlet Knights.

== Career ==
Mascoe attended Osceola High School in Kissimmee, Florida, where played cornerback and wide receiver. As a senior, he had 65 tackles with three interceptions with one returned for a touchdown on defense and 12 receptions for 268 yards with four touchdowns on offense. He committed to play college football at the Rutgers University.

== College career ==
After playing one game his first year at Rutgers in 2023, Mascoe played in all 13 games with four starts in 2024, recording 50 tackles and an interception. In 2025, he started all 12 games and had 53 tackles and an interception. After the season, he entered the transfer portal. Mascoe transferred to the University of Texas at Austin. He competed for a starting spot his first year at Texas in 2026.

=== College statistics ===
Year	Team	GP	Tackles					Interceptions				Fumbles			
Year	Team	GP	Solo	Ast	Cmb	TfL	Sck	Int	Yds	TD	PD	FR	Yds	TD	FF
2023	Rutgers	1	2	0	2	0.0	0.0	0	0	0	0	0	0	0	0
2024	Rutgers	13	25	25	50	0.5	0.0	1	0	0	5	1	3	0	0
2025	Rutgers	12	30	23	53	2.0	0.0	1	68	0	4	0	0	0	2
2026	Texas	0	0	0	0	0.0	0.0	0	0	0	0	0	0	0	0
Career		39	65	50	115	5.0	0.0	4	27	0	4	1	24	0	0
