= Dia Bell =

American football player (born 2007)

No. 6 – Texas Longhorns
- Position: Quarterback
- Class: Freshman

Personal information
- Born: May 2, 2007 (age 19); Phoenix, Arizona, U.S.
- Listed height: 6 ft 2 in (1.88 m)
- Listed weight: 215 lb (98 kg)

Career information
- High school: Plantation American Heritage (Plantation, Florida)
- College: Texas (2026–present)

Dia Bell is an American college football quarterback for the Texas Longhorns.

== Early life ==
Bell is the son of National Basketball Association (NBA) player Raja Bell. He grew up playing football and attended the Plantation American Heritage School in Florida, where he made the varsity team at quarterback in seventh grade. He was a backup for American Heritage until his sophomore year of high school, when he won the starting role. He completed 122 of 189 pass attempts for 1,929 yards and 20 touchdowns with only four interceptions in his first year as a starter, leading his team to an appearance in the class 2M state championship game.

After his sophomore season, Bell was ranked a top recruit for the class of 2026, with 247Sports ranking him the second-best quarterback nationally and a five-star recruit. He was also ranked the ninth-best player in the nation by ESPN. As a junior in 2024, he threw for 2,597 yards and 29 touchdowns to six interceptions while completing 71% of his passes, also running for 561 yards and five touchdowns while being named the Florida Gatorade Player of the Year.

Bell is committed in June 2024 to play college football for the Texas Longhorns.

Bell won the MVP at the 2025 Elite 11 Finals.

== College ==
In the 2026 season, Bell was the third-string quarterback behind Arch Manning and KJ Lacey Jr.
