= Jelani McDonald =

American football player

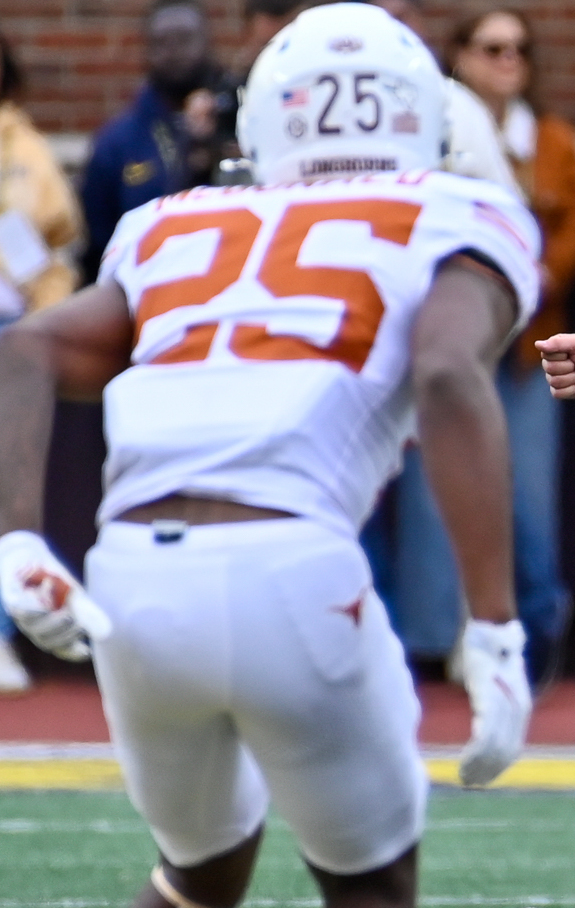
- McDonald in 2024

No. 4 – Texas Longhorns
- Position: Safety
- Class: Senior

Personal information
- Listed height: 6 ft 2 in (1.88 m)
- Listed weight: 200 lb (91 kg)

Career information
- High school: Connally (Waco, Texas)
- College: Texas (2023–present)
- Stats at ESPN

Jelani McDonald is an American college football safety for the Texas Longhorns.

== Early life ==
McDonald attended Connally High School in Waco, Texas, where he played both defensive back and quarterback. As a senior, he was the Offensive MVP of District 11-4A Division 2 after rushing 77 times for 852 yards with nine touchdowns, and passing for 707 yards with 13 touchdowns. On defense he had 25 tackles, four sacks and an interception. McDonald was selected to play in the 2023 All-American Bowl. He committed to play college football at the University of Texas at Austin.

== College career ==
As a true freshman at Texas in 2023, McDonald played in 12 games and had two tackles. As a sophomore in 2024, he played in 14 games with four starts and recorded 33 tackles and one interception.

McDonald became a starting safety his junior year in 2025. In the first four weeks of the 2025 season, McDonald contributed to three turnovers in three consecutive games, logging one fumble recovery for 24 yards against San Jose State, one interception for 16 yards against UTEP, and one interception against Sam Houston. He ended the season with 80 tackles, three interceptions, and one fumble recovery.

For the 2026 season, McDonald chose to return for his senior year and continued as the starting safety. In Week 11 against LSU, McDonald recorded three interceptions, becoming the first SEC player to record three interceptions in a single game since 2020. For his performance, McDonald was named Player of the Week by the Associated Press, Chuck Bednarik Award, Jim Thorpe Award, and Walter Camp Award.

=== College statistics ===
Year	Team	GP	Tackles					Interceptions				Fumbles			
Year	Team	GP	Solo	Ast	Cmb	TfL	Sck	Int	Yds	TD	PD	FR	Yds	TD	FF
2023	Texas	12	1	1	2	0	0.0	0	0	0	0	0	0	0	0
2024	Texas	14	15	18	33	1.0	0.0	1	0	0	1	0	0	0	0
2025	Texas	13	49	31	80	4.0	0.0	3	27	0	3	1	24	0	0
2026	Texas	10	40	38	78	3.0	0.0	4	0	0	4	0	0	0	0
Career		49	105	88	193	8.0	0.0	8	27	0	8	1	24	0	0
