= Wharton High School (Florida) =

Paul R. Wharton High School

Location
- 20150 Bruce B. Downs Boulevard; Tampa, Florida 33647; United States; 28.15856°N 82.35476°W

Information
- Other name: Wharton High School
- Type: Public high school
- Established: 1997
- School district: Hillsborough County Public Schools
- NCES School ID: 120087003185
- Principal: Taryn Anello
- Teaching staff: 99.00 (on an FTE basis)
- Grades: 9–12
- Enrollment: 2,186 (2023-2024)
- Student to teacher ratio: 22.08
- Colors: Navy and white
- Nickname: Wildcats
- Rivals: Freedom
- Yearbook: Felidae
- Website: www.hillsboroughschools.org/o/wharton

Paul R. Wharton High School (also known as Wharton High School) is a public high school in Tampa, Florida, United States. It was established in 1997 and is part of the Hillsborough County Public Schools district.

== Demographics ==
Wharton High School is 30.1% Hispanic, 29.7% Black, 27.3% White, 6.9% Multi-Racial, 6.0% Asian, and 0.1% Indian.

== Athletics ==
=== Soccer ===
In 2008, the boys' soccer team won the class 5A state championship.

=== Tennis ===
The Wildcats boys' tennis team won state championships in 2008, 2009, and 2010.

== Notable alumni ==
- Caroline DeLisle, Damallsvenskan goalkeeper
- Candice Dupree, WNBA player
- Larry Edwards, NFL player
- Ettore Ewen, professional wrestler
- Vernon Hargreaves, NFL player
- Adam Kluger, business magnate, music manager of Lil Yachty, Bhad Bhabie
- Graceson Littleton, college football cornerback for the Texas Longhorns (attended; transferred after his junior year)
- Chase Litton, NFL player
- Tre Odoms-Dukes, football player
- Auden Tate, NFL player
