= Cam Coleman =

American football player (born 2006)

- Coleman with Texas in 2026

No. 8 – Texas Longhorns
- Position: Wide receiver
- Class: Junior

Personal information
- Born: August 14, 2006 (age 20)
- Listed height: 6 ft 3 in (1.91 m)
- Listed weight: 204 lb (93 kg)

Career information
- High school: Central High School (Phenix City, Alabama)
- College: Auburn (2024–2025); Texas (2026–present)

Awards and highlights
- SEC All-Freshman Team (2024)

Cameron Coleman (born August 14, 2006) is an American college football wide receiver for the Texas Longhorns. He previously played for the Auburn Tigers. He was the #5-ranked recruit in the 2024 recruiting class.

== Early life ==
Coleman was born on August 14, 2006, and grew up in Phenix City, Alabama. He attended Central High School where he played under Patrick Nix. Coleman had 31 receptions for 542 yards and six touchdowns as a junior. As a senior, Coleman caught 61 passes for 1,372 yards and 18 touchdowns, leading Central to the state championship where he was named the games Most Valuable Player in a 21-19 victory over Thompson High School. Coleman was rated as a five-star prospect and the nation's second-ranked receiver recruit. He originally committed to Texas A&M before flipping to Auburn.

== College career ==
=== Auburn ===
As a freshman, Coleman played in 11 games, recording 37 receptions for 598 yards and eight touchdowns. He was named to the SEC All-Freshman team. As a sophomore, Coleman started in all 12 games, recording 56 receptions for 708 yards and five touchdowns. At the end of the season, he entered the transfer portal.

=== Texas ===
On January 11, 2026, Coleman transferred to Texas. In his first game as a Longhorn, he had three receptions for 70 yards and two touchdowns.

=== Statistics ===
Year	Team	Games		Receiving			
Year	Team	GP	GS	Rec	Yds	Avg	TD
2024	Auburn	11	10	37	598	16.2	8
2025	Auburn	12	12	56	708	12.6	5
2026	Texas	2	2	7	119	17.0	2
Career		25	24	100	1,425	14.3	15

== Personal life ==
Coleman's father played college football at Alabama State.
