= Michael Masunas =

American football player

- Masunas in 2026

No. 15 – Texas Longhorns
- Position: Tight end
- Class: Redshirt Senior

Personal information
- Born: October 22, 2003 (age 23)
- Listed height: 6 ft 5 in (1.96 m)
- Listed weight: 257 lb (117 kg)

Career information
- High school: Sabino (Tucson, Arizona); Hamilton (Chandler, Arizona)
- College: Michigan State (2022–2025); Texas (2026–present)
- Stats at ESPN

Michael Masunas is an American college football tight end for the Texas Longhorns. He previously played for the Michigan State Spartans.

== Early life ==
Masunas is from Tucson, Arizona. He grew up playing football and played many positions before focusing on tight end and defensive end when he entered Sabino High School in Tucson. In his first year of high school football, he was named the 3A Freshman of the Year. Masunas posted 17 receptions for 207 yards and two touchdowns in 2019 before transferring to Hamilton High School for his junior year. As a senior, he helped Hamilton to a record of 11–1 while posting 18 receptions for 274 yards and two touchdowns. A three-star prospect, he committed to play college football for the Michigan State Spartans.

== College career ==
=== Michigan State ===
As a true freshman at Michigan State University in 2022, Masunas redshirted. He was used on special teams in 2023 and played in nine games. He became a starter for the Spartans in 2024, but only caught four passes for 37 yards in four games before suffering a season-ending torn labrum. During the 2025 season, Masunas tallied 19 receptions for 232 yards and three touchdowns. At the end of the season, Masunas entered the transfer portal.

=== Texas ===
On January 5, 2026, Masunas transferred to the Texas Longhorns for his final year of eligibility. He recorded his first catch in Week 8 against Ole Miss, catching 37 yards on three receptions.

=== College statistics ===
Year	Team	Games	Receiving			
Year	Team	GP	Rec	Yds	Avg	TD
2022	Michigan State	Redshirted (redshirt)				
2023	Michigan State	9	1	1	1.0	0
2024	Michigan State	4	4	37	9.3	0
2025	Michigan State	12	19	232	12.2	3
2026	Texas	0	0	0	0.0	0
Career		25	24	270	11.3	3
