= Ryan Wingo =

American football player (born 2006)

- Wingo with Texas in 2026

No. 1 – Texas Longhorns
- Position: Wide receiver
- Class: Junior

Personal information
- Born: February 15, 2006 (age 20)
- Listed height: 6 ft 2 in (1.88 m)
- Listed weight: 211 lb (96 kg)

Career information
- High school: St. Louis University (St. Louis, Missouri)
- College: Texas (2024–present)

Awards and highlights
- Second-team All-SEC (2025)
- Stats at ESPN

Ryan Wingo (born February 15, 2006) is an American college football wide receiver for the Texas Longhorns.

== Early life ==
Wingo attended St. Louis University High School in St. Louis, Missouri. During his high school career he had 129 receptions for 2,160 yards and 31 receiving touchdowns. Wingo played in the 2024 All-American Bowl. A five-star recruit, he committed to the University of Texas at Austin to play college football.

== College career ==
In his first collegiate game as a true freshman in 2024, Wingo had four receptions for 70 yards. Wingo scored his first college touchdown against UTSA in Week 3. He played in all 16 games and ended the season with 472 receiving yards, 100 rushing yards, and 2 receiving touchdowns.

In his sophomore season in 2025, Wingo was named to the preseason All-SEC second team. He scored his first touchdown of the season in Week 3 against UTEP. In Week 4 against Sam Houston, Wingo logged 93 receiving yards, 32 rushing yards, and 2 touchdowns, making it his first game with multiple touchdowns. In Week 9 against Mississippi State, Wingo recorded a career-high 184 receiving yards on five receptions. At the end of the season, Wingo was named to the All-SEC second team.

=== College statistics ===
Year	Team	Games		Receiving				Rushing		
Year	Team	GP	GS	Rec	Yds	Avg	TD	Att	Yds	TD
2024	Texas	16	3	29	472	16.3	2	5	100	0
2025	Texas	13	13	54	834	15.4	7	7	42	0
2026	Texas	1	1	7	121	17.3	1	0	0	0
Career		30	17	90	1,427	16.3	10	12	142	0

== Personal life ==
Wingo is the younger brother of former NFL running back, Ronnie Wingo Jr.
