= Melvin Siani =

Canadian football player (born 2004)

No. 71 – Texas Longhorns
- Position: Offensive tackle
- Class: Senior

Personal information
- Born: October 10, 2004 (age 22); Hamilton, Ontario, Canada
- Listed height: 6 ft 6 in (1.98 m)
- Listed weight: 317 lb (144 kg)

Career information
- High school: Wyoming Seminary (Kingston, Pennsylvania)
- College: Temple (2023–2024); Wake Forest (2025); Texas (2026–present)
- Stats at ESPN

Melvin Siani (born October 10, 2004) is a Canadian college football offensive tackle for the Texas Longhorns. He previously played for the Temple Owls and Wake Forest Demon Deacons.

== Career ==
A soccer player in Canada growing up, Siani didn't start playing American football until his senior year at Wyoming Seminary in Kingston, Pennsylvania. He committed to Temple University to play college football.

== College career ==
In both his freshman and sophomore season, Siani played at Temple, starting nine of 15 games at right tackle. After the 2024 season, he entered the transfer portal and committed to Wake Forest. In his lone season there, Siani started all 13 games at left tackle and did not allow a sack. After ths 2025 season, he entered the portal again and committed to Texas. He entered the 2026 season as the starting right tackle.
