= KJ Lacey Jr. =

American football player (born 2007)

No. 12 – Texas Longhorns
- Position: Quarterback
- Class: Sophomore

Personal information
- Born: January 25, 2007 (age 19)
- Listed height: 6 ft 0 in (1.83 m)
- Listed weight: 188 lb (85 kg)

Career information
- High school: Saraland (Saraland, Alabama)
- College: Texas (2025–present)
- Stats at ESPN

Karle Lacey Jr. (born January 25, 2007) is an American college football quarterback for the Texas Longhorns.

== Early life ==
Lacey began his high school career at Daphne High School in Daphne, Alabama. As a freshman, he passed for 1,234 yards and eight touchdowns before transferring to Saraland High School in Saraland, Alabama. He became Saraland's starting quarterback as a sophomore. During his senior season, Lacey passed for 3,042 yards and 40 touchdowns and was named Alabama Mr. Football. He finished his high school career with 10,985 passing yards, the second-most in Alabama high school football history behind Jack Hayes. A four-star recruit, Lacey committed to the University of Texas at Austin to play college football.

== College career ==
As a freshman in 2025, Lacey appeared in one game, completing a pass against Sam Houston. He entered the 2026 season as the backup quarterback to Arch Manning. Against Texas State, Lacey completed six of seven passes for 55 yards. After Manning struggled in consecutive losses to Oklahoma and Florida, reports indicated that Lacey would receive increased first-team reps during practice.

=== Statistics ===
Year	Team	Games			Passing								Rushing			
Year	Team	GP	GS	Record	Cmp	Att	Pct	Yds	Y/A	TD	Int	Rtg	Att	Yds	Avg	TD
2025	Texas	1	0	–	1	1	100.0	7	7.0	0	0	158.8	–	–	–	–
2026	Texas	2	0	–	7	8	87.5	63	7.9	0	0	153.7	2	3	1.5	0
Career		3	0	–	8	9	88.9	70	7.8	0	0	154.2	2	3	1.5	0
