= Graceson Littleton =

American football player (born 2006)

No. 29 – Texas Longhorns
- Position: Cornerback
- Class: Sophomore

Personal information
- Born: November 14, 2006 (age 19)
- Listed height: 6 ft 0 in (1.83 m)
- Listed weight: 185 lb (84 kg)

Career information
- High school: Paul R. Wharton (Tampa, Florida); Wiregrass Ranch (Wesley Chapel, Florida)
- College: Texas (2025–present)
- Stats at ESPN

Graceson Littleton (born November 14, 2006) is an American football cornerback for the Texas Longhorns.

== Early life ==
Littleton grew up in Wichita, Kansas. He grew up playing football and helped his youth team win the city championship in fourth grade. After living in Wichita for 15 years, he moved to Tampa, Florida. He attended Paul R. Wharton High School in Tampa before transferring to Wiregrass Ranch High School as a senior. He had 30 tackles and an interception in 2023 at Wharton, then posted 30 tackles, two interceptions and eight pass breakups at Wiregrass Ranch in 2024. Littleton was a four-star recruit and was ranked the 10th-best cornerback prospect nationally. He initially committed to play college football for the Clemson Tigers in June 2024. He later changed his commitment to the Texas Longhorns in November 2024.

== College career ==
Littleton saw immediate playing time for Texas as a true freshman in 2025. After his first game, against Ohio State, he received the highest Pro Football Focus (PFF) grade among true freshmen that week. In Week 3 against UTEP, Littleton recorded his first career interception. In the Red Rivalry Game against Oklahoma, Littleton recorded his second career interception, along with one pass deflection and one tackle.

=== College statistics ===
Year	Team	GP	Tackles					Interceptions					Fumbles			
Year	Team	GP	Solo	Ast	Cmb	TfL	Sck	Int	Yds	Avg	TD	PD	FR	Yds	TD	FF
2025	Texas	13	33	14	47	4.0	0.0	2	11	5.5	0	6	0	0	0	2
Career		13	33	14	47	4.0	0.0	2	11	5.5	0	6	0	0	0	2
