= Derrek Cooper =

American football player (born 2008)

No. 5 – Texas Longhorns
- Position: Running back
- Class: Freshman

Personal information
- Born: March 27, 2008 (age 18)
- Listed height: 6 ft 1 in (1.85 m)
- Listed weight: 205 lb (93 kg)

Career information
- High school: Chaminade-Madonna (Hollywood, Florida)
- College: Texas (2026–present)
- Stats at ESPN

Derrek Cooper (born March 27, 2008) is an American college football running back for the Texas Longhorns.

== Early life ==
Cooper, who grew up in South Florida, is the nephew of MLB player Lewis Brinson, and Cooper's father and brothers also each played football. He grew up playing football and in youth leagues played "nearly every position on the football field". He first attended Cardinal Gibbons High School in Fort Lauderdale where he played football as a running back and safety, posting 49 tackles and four interceptions as a sophomore. He then transferred to Chaminade-Madonna College Preparatory School in Hollywood, Florida, for his junior year.

Cooper played running back and linebacker at Chaminade-Madonna, winning the state 1A championship in 2024 after running for 905 yards and 13 touchdowns along with posting 46 tackles, four sacks and four pass breakups. Prior to his senior year, he was selected to compete at the Under Armour All-America Game and was named the most valuable running back at the Rivals 5-star camp. He ran for 1,597 yards and 19 touchdowns as a senior, helping Chaminade-Madonna to an appearance in the state title game, and was named the Broward 4A-1A offensive player of the year and the winner of the Nat Moore Trophy as the best high school football player in South Florida. At Chaminade-Madonna, Cooper also competed in track and field, earning all-county honors in the 4 × 100 metres relay.

Cooper was ranked by ESPN as a five-star prospect and the number one running back recruit in the class of 2026. He committed to play college football for the Texas Longhorns.

== College career ==
Cooper made his college debut in Week 1 against Texas State, rushing six yards on two carries before leaving the game with an ankle injury. After the game, Texas head coach Steve Sarkisian stated that Cooper would be in a boot for the foreseeable future. In Week 3 against UTSA, Cooper scored his first collegiate touchdown and ran for 44 yards on 11 carries.
