= Emmett Mosley V =

American football player

No. 3 – Texas Longhorns
- Position: Wide receiver
- Class: Junior

Personal information
- Born: Chicago, Illinois, U.S.
- Listed height: 6 ft 2 in (1.88 m)
- Listed weight: 190 lb (86 kg)

Career information
- High school: Santa Margarita (Santa Margarita, California)
- College: Stanford (2024); Texas (2025–present)
- Stats at ESPN

Emmett Mosley V is an American college football wide receiver for the Texas Longhorns. He previously played for the Stanford Cardinal.

== Early life ==
Mosley attended Santa Margarita High School in Santa Margarita, California. He was rated as a four-star recruit and committed to play college football for the Stanford Cardinal over offers from schools such as Alabama, Notre Dame, UCLA, and USC.

== College career ==
=== Stanford ===
Mosley made his collegiate debut in Week 5 of the 2024 season, where he hauled in seven receptions for 48 yards and a touchdown versus Clemson. In Week 9, he notched four receptions for 40 yards in a loss to Wake Forest. In Week 12, Mosley totaled 13 receptions for 168 yards and three touchdowns in an upset win over #22 Louisville, earning 247Sports Freshman of the Week honors. He finished the season with 48 receptions for 525 yards and six touchdowns, with the yardage total setting a new team record for a true freshman.

During the 2025 spring portal, Mosley transferred to Texas.

=== Texas ===
Due to a lower-body injury, Mosley missed the first four games of the 2025 season. In Week 6 against Florida, Mosley made his Texas debut, catching two passes for 40 yards. In Week 9 against Mississippi State, Mosley pulled in four receptions for 53 yards and two touchdowns, including his first touchdown as a Longhorn and the game-winning touchdown in overtime.

=== College statistics ===
Year	Team	Games		Receiving				Rushing			
Year	Team	GP	GS	Rec	Yds	Avg	TD	Att	Yds	Avg	TD
2024	Stanford	9	8	48	525	10.9	6	12	6	0.5	0
2025	Texas	9	8	28	408	14.6	3	0	0	0.0	0
Career		18	16	76	933	12.3	9	12	6	0.5	0

== Personal life ==
Both of Mosley's parents played sports at the University of Notre Dame. His father Emmett Sr. was a wide receiver and running back for the Fighting Irish, while his mother Cindy was a midfielder on the soccer team. He is the elder brother of Trent Mosley, who plays wide receiver for the University of Southern California.
