= Rasheem Biles =

American football player (born 2005)

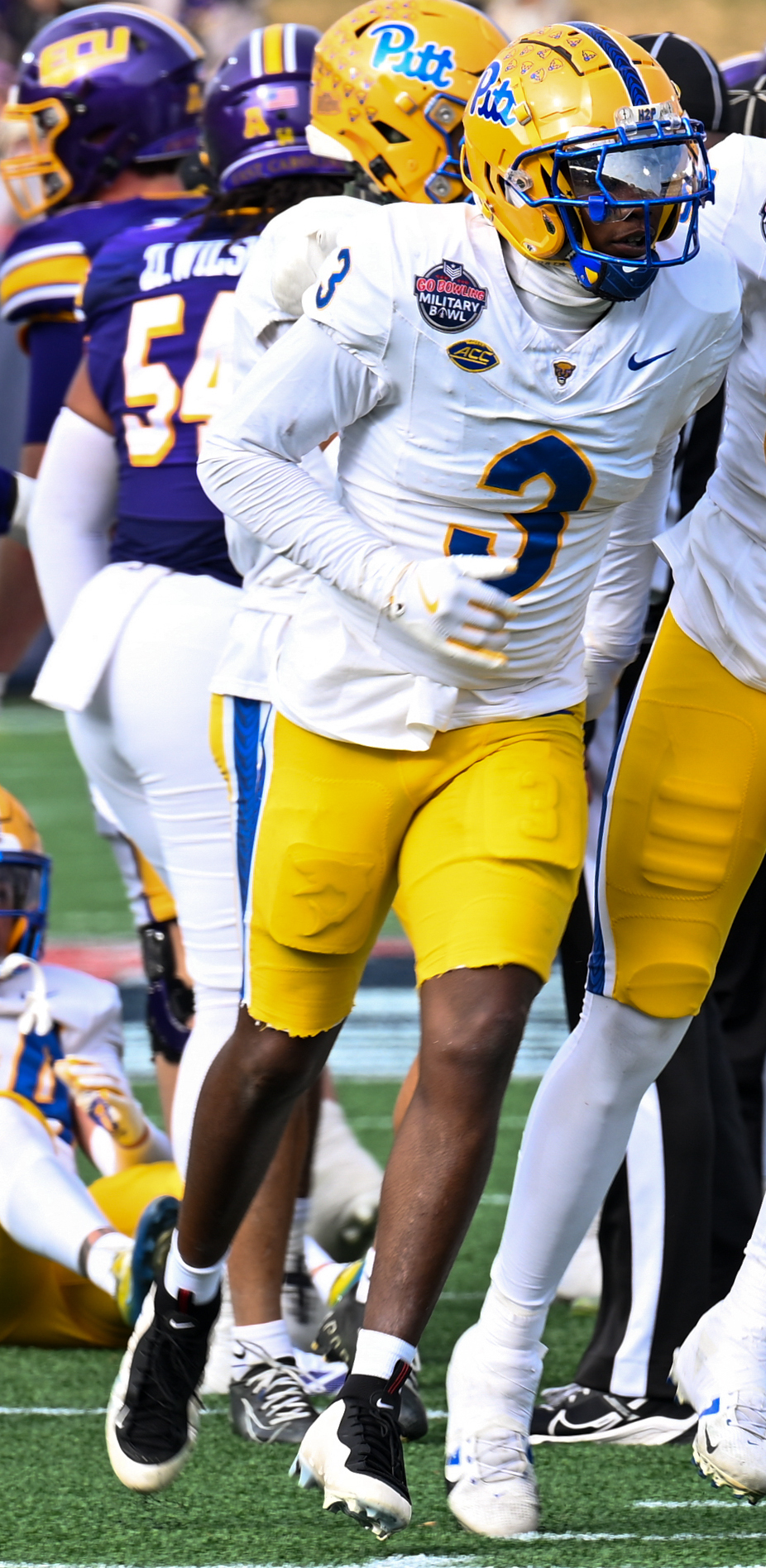
- Biles in 2025

No. 3 – Texas Longhorns
- Position: Linebacker
- Class: Senior

Personal information
- Born: November 18, 2005 (age 20)
- Listed height: 6 ft 1 in (1.85 m)
- Listed weight: 220 lb (100 kg)

Career information
- High school: Pickerington Central (Pickerington, Ohio)
- College: Pittsburgh (2023–2025); Texas (2026–present)

Awards and highlights
- Second-team All-ACC (2025); Third-team All-ACC (2024)
- Stats at ESPN

Rasheem Biles (born November 18, 2005) is an American college football linebacker for the Texas Longhorns. He previously played for the Pittsburgh Panthers.

== Early life ==
Biles attended Pickerington High School Central in Pickerington, Ohio, where he played wide receiver, running back and defensive back. As a senior he played in five games due to injury and had over 400 all-purpose yards and five total touchdowns including two interceptions returned for touchdown. As a junior he had 74 tackles and three interceptions with two returned for a touchdown. Biles committed to the University of Pittsburgh to play college.

== College career ==
=== Pittsburgh ===
As a true freshman at Pittsburgh in 2023, Biles played in nine games and tied a school record with three blocked punts. He became a starter his sophomore year in 2024, starting nine of 12 games and recording 82 tackles, 5.5 sacks and an interception which he returned for a touchdown. He returned to Pittsburgh as a starter in 2025, playing in 10 games and recording 101 tackles, 4.5 sacks, two interceptions, both returned for touchdowns, two forced fumbles, and one fumble recovery, returned for a touchdown. At the end of the season, Biles entered the transfer portal.

=== Texas ===
On January 10, 2026, Biles committed to Texas. In Week 9 against Mississippi State, Biles recorded eight tackles, including three sacks and four tackles for a loss, and two forced fumbles, earning SEC Co-Defensive Player of the Week for his performance.

=== College statistics ===
Year	Team	GP	Tackles					Interceptions					Fumbles			
Year	Team	GP	Solo	Ast	Cmb	TfL	Sck	Int	Yds	Avg	TD	PD	FR	Yds	TD	FF
2023	Pittsburgh	9	1	1	2	0.0	0.0	0	0	0.0	0	0	0	0	0	0
2024	Pittsburgh	12	46	36	82	14.5	5.5	1	35	35.0	1	9	1	0	0	1
2025	Pittsburgh	10	39	62	101	17.0	4.5	2	85	42.5	2	4	1	23	1	2
Career		31	86	99	185	31.5	10.0	3	120	40.0	3	13	2	23	1	3
