= Wiregrass Ranch High School =

Location
- 2909 Mansfield Blvd; Wesley Chapel, Florida; United States

Information
- Type: Public high school
- Established: 2006; 20 years ago
- Principal: Jennifer Waselewski
- Teaching staff: 89.40 (FTE)
- Enrollment: 2,218 (2024–25) (2024-25)
- Student to teacher ratio: 24.81
- Colors: Maroon and gray
- Nickname: Bulls
- Website: wrhs.pasco.k12.fl.us

Wiregrass Ranch High School, also known as Wiregrass for short, is a high school located in Wesley Chapel, Florida. It is part of the Pasco County School District.

== Recognitions ==
In the 2024 U.S. News Best High Schools rankings, Wiregrass was ranked 90th among Florida High Schools.

On November 23, 2019, the Wiregrass Ranch Marching Bulls won the FMBC Florida State Class 4A Championships, becoming the first marching band in Pasco County to do so, and placed third in the state.

== Notable alumni ==
- John Gant – American baseball player (born 1992)
- Rocco Becht – American football player (born 2003)
- Graceson Littleton – American football player (born 2006)
