= Tyler Atkinson =

American football player

No. 16 – Texas Longhorns
- Position: Linebacker
- Class: Freshman

Personal information
- Listed height: 6 ft 1 in (1.85 m)
- Listed weight: 217 lb (98 kg)

Career information
- High school: Grayson (Loganville, Georgia)
- College: Texas (2026–present)

Awards and highlights
- High school Butkus Award (2025)

Tyler Atkinson is an American college football linebacker for the Texas Longhorns.

== Early life ==
Atkinson attended Grayson High School in Loganville, Georgia. He had 112 tackles and eight sacks his freshman year and a school record 197 tackles with 10.5 sacks his sophomore year. As a junior, Atkinson was named the MaxPreps National Junior of the Year and The Atlanta Journal-Constitution Class 6A defensive player after recording 166 tackles and 13 sacks. As a senior, he had 77 tackles with 10 sacks and was named the Butkus Award winner and Georgia Gatorade Football Player of the Year.

A five-star recruit and one of the top ranked linebackers in his class, Atkinson was selected to play in the 2025 Navy All-American Bowl. He committed to play college football at the University of Texas at Austin.
