= Richard Wesley (American football) =

American football player (born 2008)

No. 99 – Texas Longhorns
- Position: Defensive end
- Class: Freshman

Personal information
- Listed height: 6 ft 5 in (1.96 m)
- Listed weight: 250 lb (113 kg)

Career information
- High school: Sierra Canyon (Los Angeles, California)
- College: Texas (2026–present)

Richard Wesley (born September 8, 2008) is an American college football defensive end for the Texas Longhorns.

== Early life ==
Wesley's parents both played college basketball. He began playing tackle football in seventh grade, starting as a wide receiver and defensive lineman. Wesley attended Sierra Canyon School and became a top defensive end as a freshman in 2023. He was also sometimes used as a running back at Sierra Canyon. He posted 50 tackles and 9.5 sacks in his freshman year. Wesley then tallied 44 tackles, nine sacks and four forced fumbles as a sophomore, being named a sophomore All-American by MaxPreps. As a junior in 2025, he totaled 29 tackles and 8.5 sacks.

Wesley was initially ranked among the top-five prospects in the college football recruiting class of 2027. In March 2025, he announced his intention to reclassify into the class of 2026. A five-star recruit, he was ranked by ESPN as the eighth-best player nationally and the second-best defensive end in the class of 2026. He initially committed to play college football for the Oregon Ducks. Wesley later de-committed and afterwards committed to play for the Texas Longhorns. He signed with the Longhorns in December 2025.
