= A. J. Milwee =

American football player and coach (born 1986)

Current position
- Title: Co-offensive coordinator, quarterbacks coach
- Team: Texas
- Conference: SEC

Biographical details
- Born: January 19, 1986 (age 40); Boaz, Alabama, U.S.

Playing career
- 2004: Alabama
- 2005–2008: North Alabama
- Position: Quarterback

Coaching career (HC unless noted)
- 2009–2010: North Alabama (GA)
- 2011: East Mississippi (QB)
- 2012: Akron (QB)
- 2013–2018: Akron (OC/QB)
- 2019–2020: Alabama (OA)
- 2021–2022: Texas (QB)
- 2023–present: Texas (co-OC/QB)

Alan Jacob Milwee (born January 19, 1986) is an American football coach who currently is the co-offensive coordinator and quarterbacks coach at the University of Texas at Austin. He also has stints as an assistant coach at Akron, East Mississippi Community College, and North Alabama. He played college football at North Alabama, where he broke program records in completions and touchdown passes and was a two-time Harlon Hill Trophy finalist.

== Playing career ==
A native of Boaz, Alabama, Milwee initially walked-on at Alabama in 2004, redshirting the season as a reserve quarterback. He then transferred to then-Division II North Alabama to play for head coach Mark Hudspeth. After spending the 2005 season as a backup quarterback, Milwee was named the starting quarterback in 2006 where he compiled a 33–5 record and broke several program records including passing yards, completions, and passing touchdowns. He was also a two-time finalist for the Harlon Hill Trophy, an award given to the top college football player in Division II football.

== Coaching career ==
Milwee worked as a graduate assistant at his alma mater North Alabama under Terry Bowden from 2009 to 2010, and later at East Mississippi Community College in 2011 as their quarterbacks coach.

=== Akron ===
Milwee was named the quarterbacks coach at Akron in 2012, working once again under Terry Bowden. He was promoted to offensive coordinator in 2013 at the age of 26, the 2nd youngest coordinator in FBS at the time of his hiring. He was not retained after the firing of Bowden in 2018 and was replaced by Tommy Zagorski.

=== Alabama ===
Milwee was hired as an offensive analyst at Alabama. He was later hired to be the offensive coordinator at Arkansas State under former Alabama analyst Butch Jones before accepting a position at Texas.

=== Texas ===
Milwee was hired away from Arkansas State as the quarterbacks coach at Texas under former Alabama offensive coordinator Steve Sarkisian.
