= Maraad Watson =

American football player

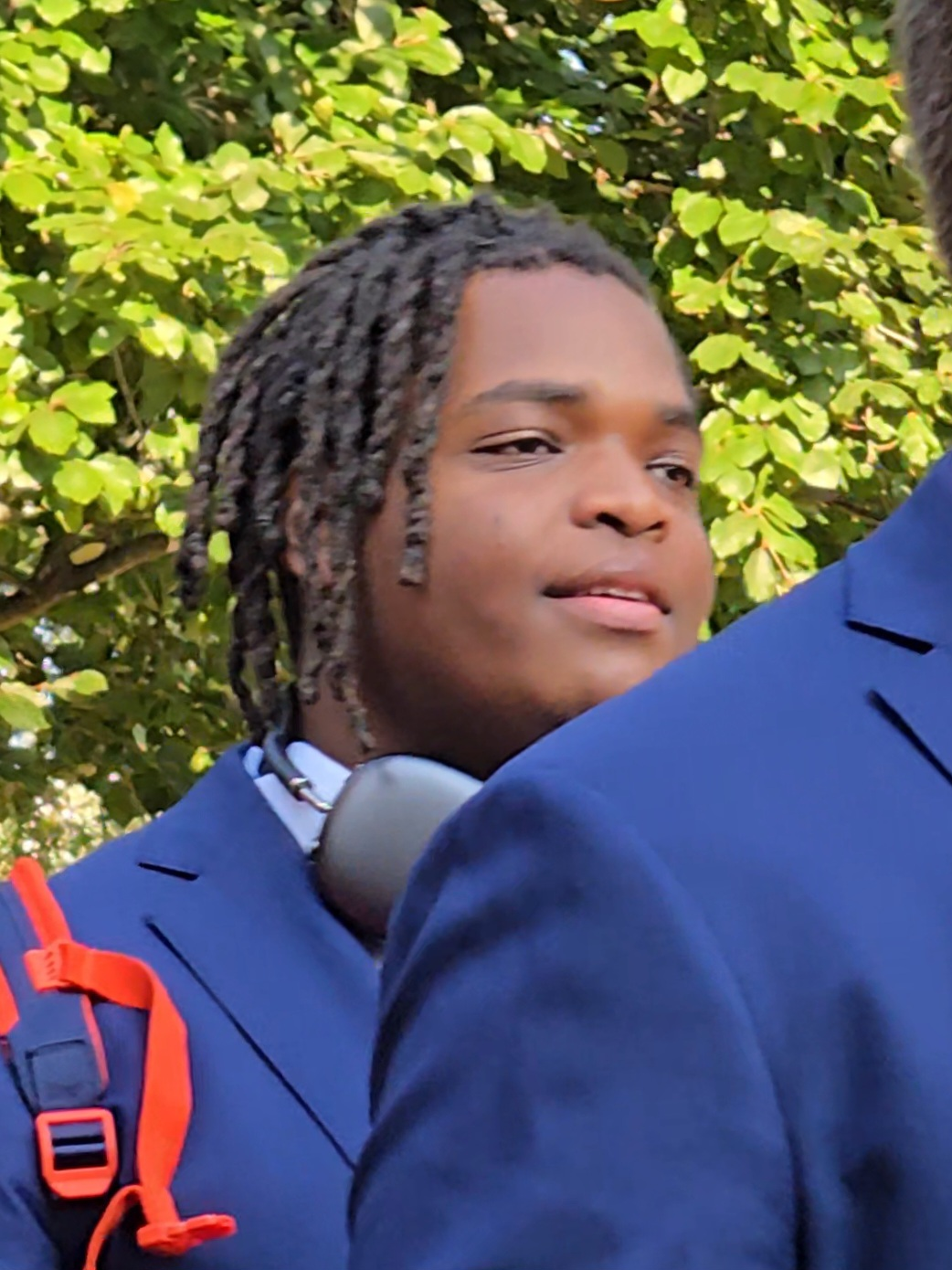

No. 88 – Texas Longhorns
- Position: Defensive tackle
- Class: Junior

Personal information
- Listed height: 6 ft 3 in (1.91 m)
- Listed weight: 333 lb (151 kg)

Career information
- High school: Irvington (Irvington, New Jersey)
- College: Syracuse (2024); Texas (2025–present)
- Stats at ESPN

Maraad Watson is an American college football defensive tackle for the Texas Longhorns. He previously played for the Syracuse Orange.

== Early life ==
Watson attended Irvington High School in Irvington, New Jersey. As a senior, he totaled 72 tackles and 15 sacks in seven games. Coming out of high school, Watson was rated as a three-star recruit, the 24th player in New Jersey and the 136th defensive tackle in the class of 2024 according to 247Sports. He received offers from schools such as Rutgers, Syracuse, Kent State, Nebraska, and Tennessee. Watson initially committed to play college football for the Kent State Golden Flashes before flipping to pick the Syracuse Orange.

== College career ==
=== Syracuse ===
In week 14 of the 2024 season, Watson notched six tackles in an upset win over Miami. During the 2024 season, he appeared in 13 games with 11 starts, where he recorded 31 tackles with one and a half being for a loss, a sack, and a pass deflection. For his performance he was named a freshman All-American by 247Sports. After the season, Watson entered the NCAA transfer portal.

=== Texas ===
After the 2024 season, Watson transferred to play for the Texas Longhorns. In Week 2 of the 2025 season, against San Jose State, Watson recorded 1.5 sacks. In Week 7 of the 2026 season, against Mississippi State, he recorded a 61-yard fumble recovery touchdown.

=== College statistics ===
Year	Team	GP	Tackles					Interceptions				Fumbles			
Year	Team	GP	Solo	Ast	Cmb	TfL	Sck	Int	Yds	TD	PD	FR	Yds	TD	FF
2025	Syracuse	13	13	18	31	1.5	1.0	0	0	0	1	0	0	0	0
2025	Texas	12	6	17	23	1.5	1.5	0	0	0	0	0	0	0	0
Career		25	19	35	54	3.0	2.5	0	0	0	1	0	0	0	0
