= Trevor Goosby =

American football player (born 2005)

No. 74 – Texas Longhorns
- Position: Offensive tackle
- Class: Redshirt Junior

Personal information
- Born: May 14, 2005 (age 21)
- Listed height: 6 ft 7 in (2.01 m)
- Listed weight: 314 lb (142 kg)

Career information
- High school: Melissa (Melissa, Texas)
- College: Texas (2023–present)

Awards and highlights
- First-team All-SEC (2025)
- Stats at ESPN

Trevor Goosby (born May 14, 2005) is an American college football offensive tackle for the Texas Longhorns.

== Early life ==
Goosby attended Melissa High School in Melissa, Texas, where he played both football and basketball. He was rated as a three-star recruit and originally committed to play college football for the TCU Horned Frogs over schools such as Kansas, SMU, Colorado State, Jackson State, UTSA, North Texas, and Tulsa. However, Goosby later flipped his commitment to play for the Texas Longhorns.

== College career ==
As a freshman in 2023, Goosby took a redshirt. In the 2024 regular season finale, he made his first collegiate start in a victory over rival Texas A&M. In the 2024 season, Goosby appeared in 15 games where he made two starts. In the 2025 season, Goosby became the starting left tackle after the departure of Kelvin Banks Jr. In Week 14 against Texas A&M, Goosby allowed no sacks or pressures, even as he faced off with the SEC's leader in sacks, and was the highest graded offensive lineman. For his performance, he was named Co-Offensive Lineman of the Week. At the end of the season, Goosby was named to the All-SEC first team. In the 2026 season, Goosby continued as the starter at left tackle. In Week 8 against Ole Miss, Goosby sustained a knee injury, leading him to miss the remainder of the season.

== Personal life ==
His brother, Austin Goosby is a college basketball player for Texas. His uncle, Bert Milliner played as a wide receiver for Oklahoma State in the 1990s, while his great great uncle is NFL Hall of Fame cornerback Night Train Lane.
