= Blake Gideon =

American football player and coach (born 1989)

Current position
- Title: Defensive Pass Game Coordinator / Secondary Coach
- Team: Texas
- Conference: SEC

Biographical details
- Born: June 25, 1989 (age 37); DeLeon, Texas, U.S.
- Education: University of Texas at Austin

Playing career
- 2008–2011: Texas
- 2012: Arizona Cardinals
- 2012–2013: Denver Broncos
- Position: Safety

Coaching career (HC unless noted)
- 2014: Florida (DQC)
- 2015: Auburn (GA)
- 2016–2017: Western Carolina (DB)
- 2018: Georgia State (CB)
- 2019: Houston (ST/S)
- 2020: Ole Miss (ST)
- 2021–2024: Texas (S)
- 2025: Georgia Tech (DC)
- 2026–present: Texas (DPGC/DB)

Blake Gideon (born July 25, 1989) is an American football coach and former player. He currently is the defensive pass game coordinator & secondary coach at Texas. As a player, Gideon started all 52 games at safety during his college football career at Texas, which ranks second in school history. Afterwards, he played professionally for the Arizona Cardinals and the Denver Broncos of the NFL.

== High school ==
Gideon was a two-time all-state selection at Leander High School in football. On the gridiron, Gideon recorded 300 tackles, 10 INTs, six forced fumbles, seven fumble recoveries and 14 TDs in his three years as a starter. He was coached by his father, Steve Gideon. He also lettered in baseball and track and field.

== College career ==
As a freshman safety, Gideon dropped a potential game-sealing interception against the Texas Tech Red Raiders. On the very next play, with just one second remaining, Texas Tech wide receiver Michael Crabtree caught a game-winning touchdown pass, ending Texas’ undefeated season and dashing its hopes of reaching the 2009 BCS National Championship Game. The Associated Press described Crabtree’s dramatic score as "arguably the biggest touchdown of the college football season." Due to a tiebreaker, Texas instead earned a berth in the Fiesta Bowl.

As a sophomore for the Longhorns, Gideon started every game and emerged as a defensive cornerstone, recording five interceptions. He helped anchor a unit that allowed just 251 yards per game — the third-best total defense in the nation.

Gideon started all 52 games as safety during his college career. His 52 consecutive starts rank second all-time at Texas. He was named to the 2011 Jim Thorpe Award watch list and was a four-time honorable mention All-Big 12 selection. Gideon posted 276 tackles (166 solo), 10 INTs, 20 PBU, two sacks, eight TFL, two forced fumbles, two fumble recoveries and a blocked punt during his college career. He was said to have been a "coach on the field."

== Professional career ==
Gideon went undrafted in the 2012 NFL draft and was signed as a free agent by the Arizona Cardinals on April 30, 2012. He completed training camp with the Cardinals but was waived on August 21. On October 9 he was signed by the Broncos to their practice squad. He was placed on the reserve/retired list on May 21, 2013, but the Broncos still hold his rights if he desires to return.

== Coaching career ==
On August 24, 2014, Gideon joined the Florida Gators as a defensive quality control coach. Gideon had played the first three seasons of his college career for the Longhorns under Gators head coach Will Muschamp, who was the defensive coordinator at UT at the time. In 2015, Gideon joined the Auburn Tigers as a graduate assistant. He was given the defensive backs coach duties at Auburn during preparation for the 2015 Birmingham Bowl vs. Memphis after Travaris Robinson joined Muschamp’s staff at South Carolina. Gideon would follow Robinson and Muschamp to South Carolina in January 2016 as a linebackers and special teams graduate assistant coach before accepting a full-time position at Western Carolina, where he was the defensive backs coach for 2 seasons.

In Spring 2018, he joined the Georgia State Staff as the cornerbacks coach. In January 2019, Gideon was hired by newly named head coach Dana Holgorsen to coach safeties and be special teams coordinator at the University of Houston. Gideon was hired by Lane Kiffin to join him at Ole Miss starting with the 2020 season.

After one season in Oxford, Gideon returned to his alma mater to be the safeties coach on Steve Sarkisian's inaugural Texas Longhorns football staff in 2021. The Longhorns won a Big 12 Championship in 2023 and earned back-to-back College Football Playoff appearances.

On February 7, 2025, Gideon was hired as the defensive coordinator for the Georgia Tech Yellow Jackets.

In 2026, Gideon returned to Texas as the defensive pass game coordinator & secondary coach under Will Muschamp.
