= Jermaine Bishop Jr. =

American football player (born 2008)

No. 4 – Texas Longhorns
- Position: Wide receiver / cornerback
- Class: Freshman

Personal information
- Born: January 2, 2008 (age 18)
- Listed height: 6 ft 0 in (1.83 m)
- Listed weight: 165 lb (75 kg)

Career information
- High school: Willis (Willis, Texas)
- College: Texas (2026–present)

Jermaine Bishop Jr. (born January 2, 2008) is an American college football wide receiver and cornerback for the Texas Longhorns.

== Early life ==
The cousin of quarterback Michael Bishop, Bishop started playing football at age three. He attended Willis High School in Willis, Texas, where, as a freshman, he played on the varsity team as a wide receiver and cornerback, winning District 13-6A Newcomer of the Year while leading the district in interceptions. He was one of the top targets of quarterback DJ Lagway as a sophomore and recorded 1,414 receiving yards and 17 touchdowns. As a junior, he had 1,565 receiving yards and 18 touchdowns, along with 26 tackles and three interceptions, being named the district MVP. He broke the Houston-area career record for receiving yards as a senior and finished the season with 1,940 receiving yards and 20 touchdowns, 424 rushing yards and eight touchdowns, 86 tackles and four interceptions, while recording over 2,600 all-purpose yards.

A five-star recruit, Bishop was ranked by 247Sports as a top-20 player nationally and the number one athlete in the 2026 recruiting class. He committed to play college football for the Texas Longhorns.

== College career ==
Bishop made his college debut in Week 1 of the 2026 season against Texas State, logging two receptions for 25 yards. He scored his first college touchdown in Week 6 against Oklahoma.
