= Cole Hutson (American football) =

American football player (born 2004)

No. 54 – Texas Longhorns
- Position: Offensive lineman
- Class: Senior

Personal information
- Born: January 19, 2004 (age 22)
- Listed height: 6 ft 5 in (1.96 m)
- Listed weight: 308 lb (140 kg)

Career information
- High school: Frisco (Frisco, Texas)
- College: Texas (2022–present)
- Stats at ESPN

Cole Hutson (born January 19, 2004) is an American football offensive lineman for the Texas Longhorns.

== Early life ==
Hutson attended Frisco High School in Frisco, Texas. He committed to play college football for the Texas Longhorns over offers from other schools such as Alabama, Oklahoma, Penn State, and Texas A&M.

== College career ==
As a freshman during the 2022 season, Hutson started all 13 games at right guard. Over the next two seasons in 2023 and 2024, he served as a backup offensive lineman, playing in 25 games. Heading into the 2025 season, Hutson split time at center and both left and right guard. He started 10 games that season. After participating in minicamps with the Cleveland Browns and Dallas Cowboys, Hutson returned to Texas for the 2026 season after being granted a fifth year of eligibility.
