= Brandon Baker (American football) =

American football player

No. 73 – Texas Longhorns
- Position: Guard
- Class: Junior

Personal information
- Listed height: 6 ft 4 in (1.93 m)
- Listed weight: 305 lb (138 kg)

Career information
- High school: Mater Dei (Santa Ana, California)
- College: Texas (2024–present)
- Stats at ESPN

Brandon Baker is an American college football offensive lineman for the Texas Longhorns.

== Early life ==
Baker attended Mater Dei High School in Santa Ana, California. As a senior, he was named the Los Angeles Times football lineman of the year. Baker was selected to play in the 2024 All-American Bowl. Rated a five-star recruit and #2 offensive tackle, he committed to the University of Texas at Austin to play college football.

== College career ==
In the 2024 season, Baker was the backup right tackle for Cameron Williams and appeared in eight games. In the 2025 season, Baker became the starting right tackle following the departure of Williams. In the 2026 season, Baker moved from right tackle to right guard.
