= Crehan =

Irish surname

Crehan/Crean/O'Crean/Crahen O'Creaghan
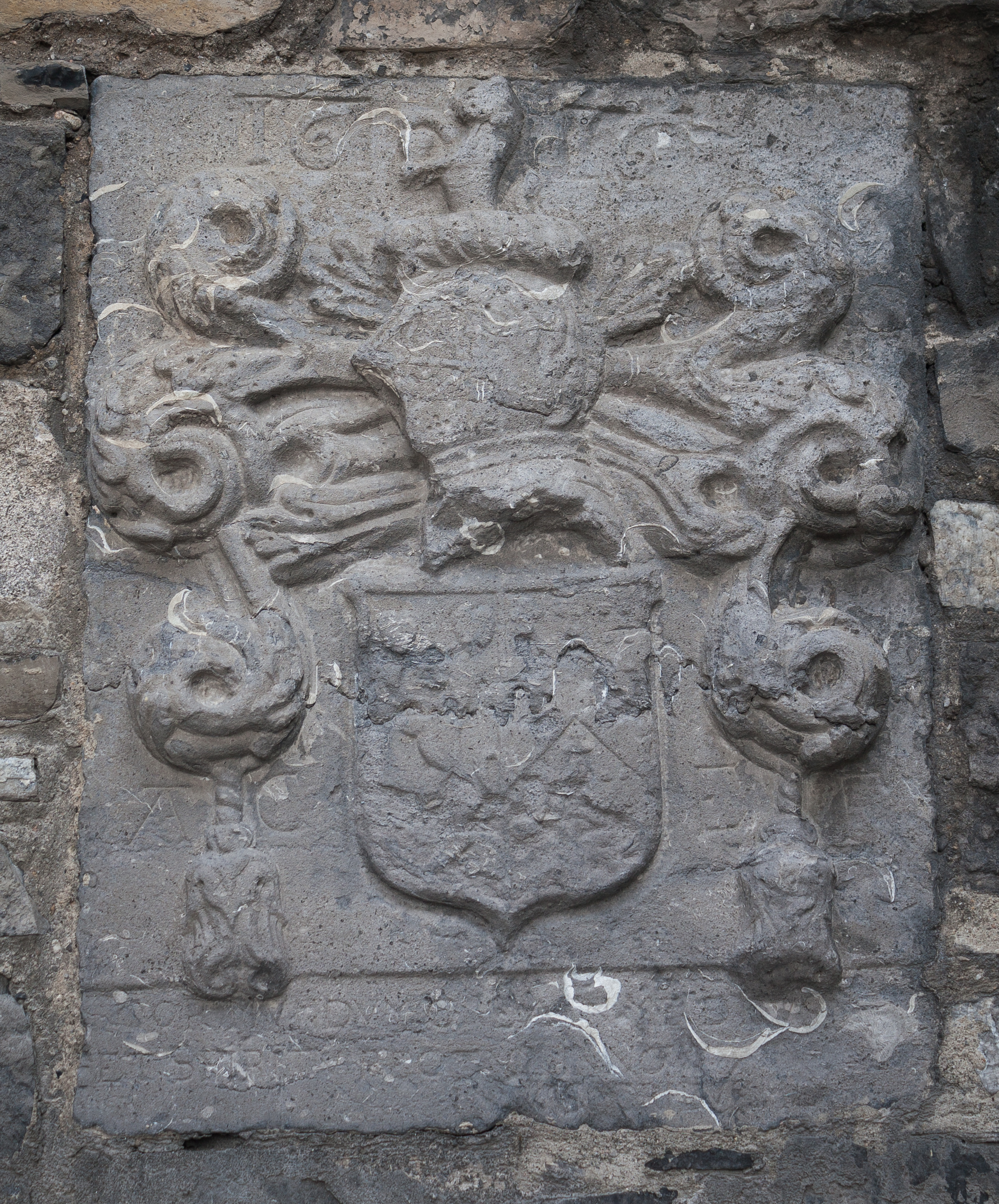
- The O'Crean arms in Sligo Abbey
- Parent house: Cineál Eoghain
- Country: Donegal, Sligo, and Galway
- Historic seat: Crean's Castle, Sligo

Crehan or O'Crehan is a surname with origins in the west of Ireland. Historically, it was rendered as Crean, O'Crean, Cregan, Crahen or O'Cregan. Creaghan and O'Creaghan are a mix of the English language and the Irish language. Cryan is another variant of the name.

== History ==
=== Origins ===
==== Colla Uais and Colla-da-Chrioch, Fermanagh (4th century) ====
Historian and genealogist John O'Hart stated that O'Criochain, anglicised as Creehan and Crehan, was a tenth generation descendant of Colla Uais who was the 121st Monarch of Ireland in the 4th century. Although most early references to the name place it in the west of Ireland, O'Hart also stated that the O'Criochain were descended from Colla-da-Chrioch who was the brother of Colla Uais and that the name was anglicised as O'Creighan, O'Greighan, Cregan, Crehan, Creighton, Creehan, Grehan, and Graham, a numerous clan in Fermanagh.

==== Hy Fiachrach, County Galway (13th century) ====
An early reference to the name is in the Annals of the Four Masters which was written between 1632 and 1636, and which says that Murrough O'Creaghan, Lord of Hy Fiachrach, County Galway, was killed for a violation of the shrine of Columbkille in 1200. The Book of Ballymote, which according to its 1887 publication, was compiled in the 15th century and has a genealogy of the "Hy-Fiachra" race. The Annals of the Four Masters also state that in 1243, Malone O'Creghan who was the Archdeacon of Tuam, County Galway, died in Dublin, having returned across the sea as a professor. According to the 17th century manuscript of Dubhaltach Mac Fhirbhisigh (fl. 1643 – January 1671) and also the 15th century Great Book of Lecan, in the genealogy for the Hy Fiachrach, Eochaid Breac, son of Dathi, had four sons including Brethe who in turn had a son named Breanainn who was the ancestor of the family of O'Creachain, now anglicised as Creaghan and Greahan.

==== Cenél nEógain, in Donegal and Sligo (5th to 16th centuries) ====
According to the genealogist Edward MacLysaght, the Crehans, Creans, O'Creans, Cregans, O'Cregans, and Creegans together in Donegal, and with a branch in the neighboring County Sligo, were a minor sept of the Cenél nEógain, which was a branch of the Northern Uí Néill and which existed from the 5th to 16th centuries. Historian C. Thomas Cairney also stated that the O'Creans, Crehans and Creghans were a sept of the Cenél nEógain from Donegal and who later moved to Sligo.

The Creaghs were a separate family who were originally from the clan called the Dalcassians of the 10th century in County Clare and who later became merchants in Limerick and Cork, as well as producing several churchmen in the 15th century.

=== 15th to 16th centuries ===
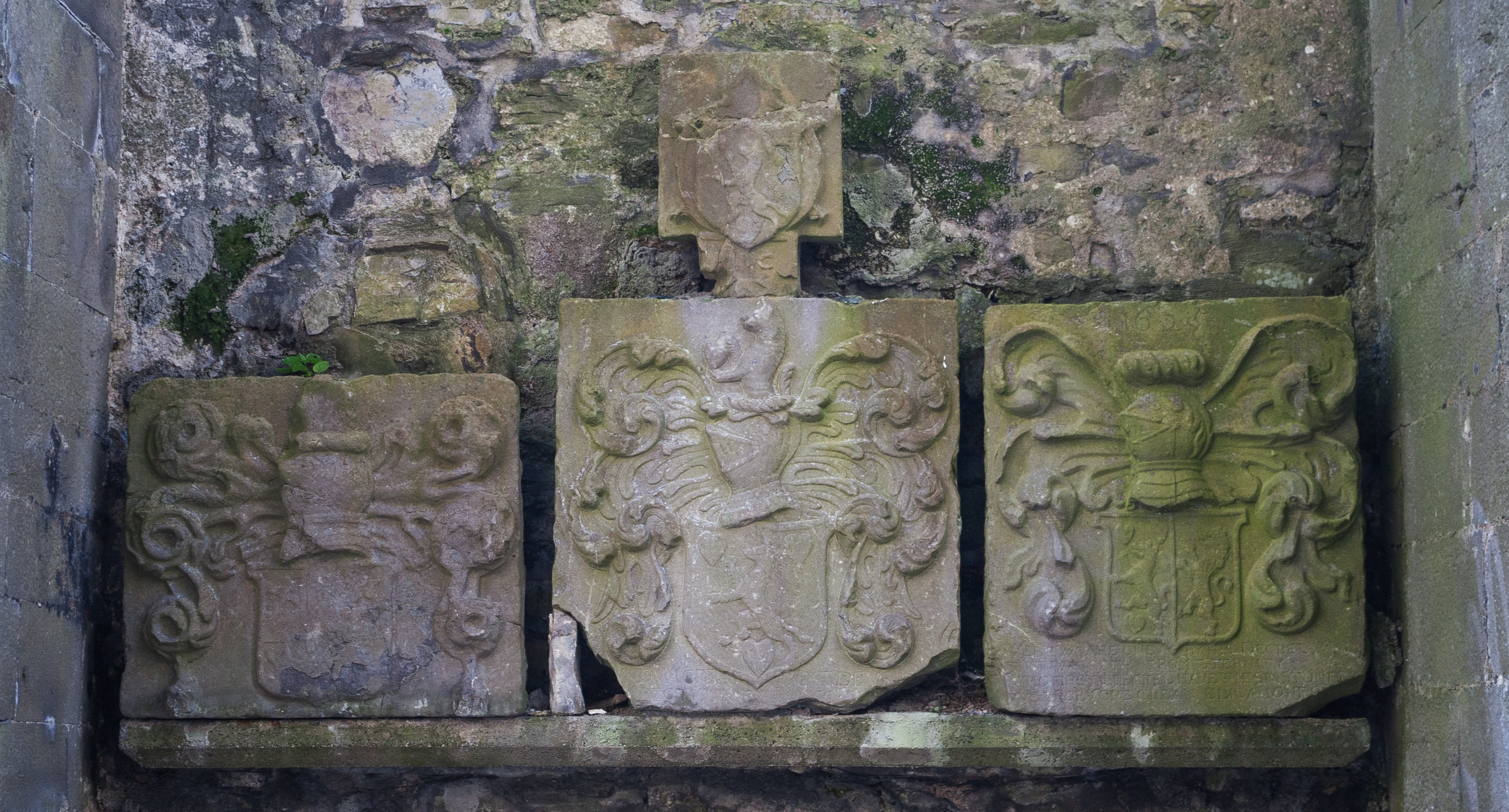
The O'Crean arms in the Carved Altar and Mural Monuments in Sligo Abbey

The O'Crean family were important and wealthy merchants who were originally from Donegal but who came to Sligo in the late 15th century. In Sligo, there is a O'Craian or Crean tomb that dates to 1506 and includes a crest of the O'Creans.

The Annals of the Four Masters also describe a Donnell O'Craidhen (O'Crean) who was a merchant who died while hearing mass in Donegal in 1506 and a Henry O'Craidhen (Crean) who was a "rich and affluent" merchant who died in 1572 in Lower Connaught.

A 16th century manuscript, A Description of Ireland as it is in hoc anno 1598, describes a John O'Crean who was head of his house or town of Bellanagare, which was then within the boundaries of County Sligo. According to the same manuscript, the head of the family in the 16th century was O'Crean of Annagh. James Crean was High Sheriff of Sligo in 1590.

=== Early 17th century ===
In 1608, Daniel O'Crean returned from Spain and established a Dominican Order in Sligo. Andrew Crean was High Sheriff of Sligo in 1629, 1630, 1641, and 1642.

=== Crean's Castle ===
Crean's Castle was in Sligo and it was a fortified tower house. It was besieged for eight to ten days during the Irish Rebellion of 1641 when a number of English residents had taken refuge there and Andrew O'Crean negotiated the terms of surrender of his castle. Among the Irish besiegers were captains Richard O'Crean and John O'Crean. During the siege, Andrew O'Crean sent Ann Gasgein and her husband John Stanoway who were English to what he thought was the relative safety of Owen MacDermot's house. However, when they arrived MacDermot was away and they were met by his wife who had them removed. When MacDermmot returned he sent Stanoway with his wife and children with an armed guard of four men to go to the garrison at Boyle. However, whilst on their journey, one of the armed guards broke away and went to the Irish camp at Ballinafad. He returned and when they were approaching Boyle he whistled and Stanoway and his family were attacked by seven armed men. Stanoway was stabbed to death and his wife Ann Gasgein was stripped, but she survived to give a disposition of these events in 1653.

After the rising of 1641, the O'Creans seem to have dropped the O in their surname and it became simply Crean. After the rising had been suppressed, Andrew Crean and his wife, Agnes French, were transplanted from Annagh in County Sligo and were compensated with 600 acres in Annagh in County Mayo. A Julian Crean is recorded with them who jointly received 634 acres.

During the Irish Confederate Wars in 1645, parliamentary forces under Charles Coote from Ulster attacked Sligo which was the northern gateway to Connacht. An Irish officer described how "the garrison of Crean's Castle behaved themselves so gallant as they beat them from it; upon which the enemy sounded a parley; and promised a fair and honourable quarter; whereupon our men came away, and after coming into the street were disarmed, stripped and foully murdered, together with all the boys and women".

Nicholas Taaffe, 6th Viscount Taaffe was born circa 1685 at Crean's Castle, the son of Francis Taaffe and Ann Crean, daughter of John Crean of Crean's Castle. John Crean was the son of Andrew Crean of Annagh.

=== 19th to 20th centuries ===
According to the appendix of the above-mentioned manuscript of 1598, as found in its 1878 publication, the representative of the O'Crean of Annagh family in the 19th century was Crean-Lynch of Clogher House in County Mayo. This was through maternal descent from the Creans of Annagh.

In the 20th century, the Crehan spelling variant is found most usually in County Galway and in County Mayo it is most often found as Crean, Grenhan and sometimes as Graham. The Creegan variant is most likely to belong to County Sligo. The Crean variant is often found in Munster. O'Corrain which is Curran in English has become Crean in some places.

The O'Creans of Dongal and Sligo have their own coat of arms.

== Notable people of the surnames ==
=== Crean ===
- Anthony Crean (1911–1975), English priest
- Arthur Crean, American soldier
- David Crean (born 1950), Australian politician
- Edward Crean (1887–1940), English rugby union player
- Eugene Crean (1854–1939), Irish nationalist politician
- Fiona Crean, Canadian ombudsman
- Frank Crean (1916–2008), Australian politician
- Frank Crean (1875–1932), Canadian Civil engineer
- Gordon Gale Crean (1914–1976), Canadian diplomat
- Kelly Crean (born 1974), American actress
- Paddy Crean (1911–2003), British actor
- Simon Crean (1949–2023), Australian politician
- Stephen Crean (1947–1985), Australian public servant
- Stephen Crean, hero of the 2025 Cambridgeshire train stabbing.
- Thomas Crean (1873–1923), Irish rugby union player and soldier
- Tom Crean (1877–1938), Irish explorer of the Antarctic
- Tom Crean (basketball coach) (born 1966), American college basketball coach

=== Cregan ===
- Curtis Cregan (born 1977), American singer and actor
- Dale Cregan (born 1983), convicted British drug-dealer and murderer
- Denis Cregan (born 1940), Irish publican and former Fine Gael party politician
- Éamonn Cregan (born 1945), Irish former Gaelic footballer, hurler and manager
- George Cregan (1885–1969), Commander in the United States Navy
- Jim Cregan (born 1946), English rock guitarist and bassist
- John Cregan (athlete) (1878–1965), American athlete who specialised in the 800 metres
- John Cregan (politician) (born 1961), former Irish Fianna Fáil politician
- Martin Cregan (1788–1870), portrait painter who practised both in Dublin and London
- Máirín Cregan (1891–1975), nationalist and writer in Ireland
- Ned Cregan (1901–1972), Irish retired hurler who played as a left wing-forward
- Pete Cregan (1875–1945), outfielder in Major League Baseball
- Peter Cregan (1918–2004), Irish hurler who played as a goalkeeper
- Robert Cregan (born 1988), Irish racing driver

=== Crehan ===
- Bernard J. Crehan, Irish priest and writer, was born on 2 July 1874
- Joseph Crehan (July 15, 1883 – April 15, 1966) an American film actor
- Junior Crehan, (born Martin Crehan, 17 January 1908 – 3 August 1998) was an Irish fiddle player
- Paddy Crehan, (18 February 1920 – 11 February 1992) was an Irish basketball player
- Susan Crehan, (born 12 September 1956) was a British long-distance runner

=== Creehan ===
- Casey Creehan, American football coach
- Dennis Creehan (born 1949), American football coach

=== Creagan ===
- James Creagan (born 1940), United States diplomat
- Richard Creagan, American politician from Hawaii

=== Creaghan ===
- Paul Creaghan (born 1937), Canadian politician in the Legislative Assembly of New Brunswick
- Spencer Creaghan, soundtrack producer for the album The Great and Secret Show
- William Creaghan (1922–2008), Progressive Conservative party member of the House of Commons of Canada

=== Cryan ===
- Carmel Cryan (born 1949), British actress
- Colin Cryan (fl. 2000s), Irish footballer
- John Cryan (born 1960), British banker
- John F. Cryan (1929–2005), American politician
- Joseph Cryan (born 1961), American politician
- Robert Cryan (1827–1881), Irish physician and educator
- Walter Cryan (born 1932), Radio personality from Rhode Island

=== McCrehan ===
- Frank McCrehan, was an American baseball player and coach at Boston College

=== As a given name ===
- Crean Brush (c. 1725–1778), Irish-born Loyalist

== See also ==
- John Crehan Park
- Courage Ltd v Crehan
- Creggan
- Irish clans
