= Creaghan =

Creaghan may refer to:

- Creaghan (surname), an Irish surname
- A stream in the barony of Armagh
- Creaghan Building, a building constructed in Miramichi, New Brunswick in 1924 designed by René-Arthur Fréchet
- A townland in the parish of Clonfeacle, County Tyrone, Northern Ireland

== See also ==
- Creagan (disambiguation)
