= Santa Margarita Catholic High School =

Catholic high school in Rancho Santa Margarita, California

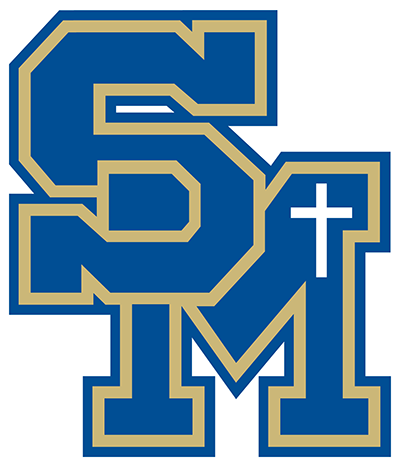

Location
- 22062 Antonio Parkway; Rancho Santa Margarita, Orange County, California 92688; United States; 33°38′34″N 117°34′56″W

Information
- Type: Private, Coeducational
- Motto: Caritas Christi (Latin) (Love of Christ)
- Religious affiliation: Catholic
- Patron saint: St. Margaret Mary Alacoque
- Established: 1987
- Founder: Bishop William R. Johnson
- School district: Diocese of Orange
- Oversight: Diocese of Orange
- Superintendent: Erin Barisano
- School code: 052563
- CEEB code: 052563
- President: Andy Sulick
- Principal: Cheri Wood
- Chaplain: Fr. Timothy Donovan
- Staff: 239
- Faculty: 120
- Grades: 9-12
- Enrollment: 1,673 (2018)
- Average class size: 395, average class size of 28
- Student to teacher ratio: 16:1
- Campus: Suburban
- Campus size: 42 acres (170,000 m^{2})
- Colors: Blue and gold
- Fight song: Notre Dame Victory March
- Athletics conference: CIF Southern Section; Trinity League
- Mascot: Eagle
- Team name: Eagles
- Accreditation: Western Association of Schools and Colleges
- USNWR ranking: Ranked number 2 Catholic School in the county by Niche.com
- National ranking: No. 51 for private high schools in the nation by the Washington Post
- Newspaper: The Eagle Eye
- Yearbook: The Talon
- Tuition: Yearly Registration is $550 and Yearly Technology Fee $685 plus, $14,975 Registered Catholic, $16,650 Non Catholic (2016-2016)
- Website: smhs.org

Santa Margarita Catholic High School (SMCHS) is a coeducational college preparatory Catholic high school located in Rancho Santa Margarita, California, United States. SMCHS is owned and operated by the Diocese of Orange, and was opened in 1987 under the direction of the Bishop of Orange. Although it follows the Catholic tradition, admission is open to students of all faiths. As of fall 2018, 1,673 students were enrolled in grades 9 through 12.

SMCHS opened in the fall of 1987, the first Catholic high school to serve South Orange County. Its 42-acre (170,000 m^{2}) campus is adjacent to the San Francisco Solano parish church. Accredited by the Western Association of Schools and Colleges, Santa Margarita is one of three International Baccalaureate (IB) World Schools in California, in addition to offering Advanced Placement (AP) courses and exams. SMCHS also offers a comprehensive Auxiliary Studies Program (ASP) to help students who learn differently than others. The Class of 2015 earned $30 million in scholarship offers.

== Campus ==
Groundbreaking for the school was held on April 18, 1986. It opened with 216 students on September 2, 1987. The three-story "G" building was completed in 1990.

The Eagle Athletic Center opened in May 2010. The center is the first LEED-certified building in the Diocese of Orange and in Rancho Santa Margarita. In August 2011, the school opened its new $10.3 million 2-story, LEED-certified academic building, that houses a permanent 3,700 square foot television studio, new counseling offices and ASP classrooms, and a second story completely devoted to World Language classrooms. A "Talon Theatre" replaced the "Eagle Dome" that is currently used for talent productions.

== Admissions ==
Admission to Santa Margarita Catholic High School is based on academic transcripts, extracurricular activities, and the high school placement test, which is used to help place students in the most appropriate classes for their freshman year. The admissions process includes: the application process, review of academic transcripts, review of standardized testing results, recommendation letters from the students' Math teacher, English Teacher, and Principal/School Counselor, and participation in activities. Prospective Students are encouraged to shadow a current SMCHS student. Incoming freshman students spend the day at Santa Margarita with a current SMCHS freshman with similar interests.

== Curriculum ==
A variety of courses is offered to students, which gives each student the opportunity to take courses fit to his/her individual strengths. SMCHS offers numerous Honors courses, Advanced Placement courses, an International Baccalaureate program, an Interdisciplinary Triad Program, and an Auxiliary Studies Program for students with mild learning differences. Along with this curriculum, SMCHS also offers a Model United Nations (MUN) program as part of the Honors History department and an Arts and Dance program that encompasses various branches of the performing arts and art classes.

The spiritual aspect of Santa Margarita is developed within students through religious education classes, school wide masses, and various retreats throughout the year. The retreat experience culminates with Kairos, a retreat specifically for seniors. Each student also works to fulfill Christian Service projects each year which are undertaken in the students' religion classes.

Students must accrue a minimum of 270 credits of course work to graduate from SMCHS. Included within credits completed satisfactorily are the following course requirements:

Students are expected to meet all Christian Service obligations before graduation. SMCHS provides students with the opportunity to be involved with different Campus Ministry activities. There are grade level retreats and campus retreats, Kairos, Peer Ministry, and several school wide masses throughout the year.

== Extracurricular activities ==
SMCHS has several extra-curricular activities on campus. These activities include ASB/Student Council, Color Guard, Drama Productions, Mock Trial, and Pep Squad.

Co-curricular activities: Choir, Dance Team, Debate and Argument, Band (Eagle Regiment), Eagle Television (ETV Public Address Morning Announcements), Journalism (The Eagle Eye Newspaper), Model United Nations, Mock Trial, Orchestra, and Yearbook.

== Athletics ==
Santa Margarita Catholic High School's athletic teams, known as the Eagles, compete in the Trinity League. SMCHS also offers club sports including ice hockey and equestrian. Since 1991, the Eagles have captured 245 league titles, 79 CIF titles, 9 Southern California Regional titles and 12 State Champion titles. In addition to those team successes, SMCHS has produced over 145 individual CIF Champions and 54 CIF Players of the Year. has produced many distinguished athletes such as NBA All-Star Klay Thompson, Heisman Trophy winner Carson Palmer, Olympic gold medalist and winner of the 2015 FIFA Women's World Cup Amy Rodriguez, Outland Trophy recipient Kris Farris, Buffalo Sabres first-round draft pick Ryan Johnson, and recipient of the Walter Payton Award and Atlanta Falcons wide receiver Brian Finneran.

SMCHS participates in 15 sports: football, volleyball, basketball, soccer, water polo, cross country, golf, tennis, wrestling, baseball, softball, lacrosse, ice hockey, track and field, and swimming.

== Notable alumni ==
- Jason Stiles (1991) – former AFL quarterback
- Kelly Crean (1992) – actress
- Brian Finneran (1994) – former NFL wide receiver
- Kris Farris (1995) – former NFL offensive lineman
- Ethan Luck (1996) – drummer for Relient K and for guitarist for O.C. Supertones
- Brian Piesner (1996) – former MLS player
- John Minardi (1997) – former college football player
- Ryan Forehan-Kelly (1998) – assistant coach for the Brooklyn Nets, played overseas
- Carson Palmer (1998) – former NFL All-Pro quarterback and current SMCHS head football coach
- Chris Rix (2000) – sportscaster, former college football quarterback
- Kristin Lynch (2001) – political speechwriter
- Ryan Eggold (2002) – actor
- Doug Reinhardt (2002) – reality television personality
- Erika Figge (2003) – water polo player
- Beau Hossler (2003) – professional golfer
- Jared Hughes (2003) – former MLB pitcher
- Mark Restelli (2004) – former NFL linebacker
- Michael Brady (2005) – former MLB pitcher
- Kristin Cavallari (2005 - transferred) – reality television personality
- Amy Rodriguez (2005) – former soccer player for the USWNT, Olympic gold medalist
- Mark Sanchez (2005 - transferred) – former NFL quarterback
- Mychel Thompson (2007) – former NBA player
- Klay Thompson (2008) – All-Star basketball player for the Miami Heat
- A. J. Cruz (2009) – former NFL wide receiver
- Gavin Escobar (2009) – former NFL tight end
- Michael Hoyos (2009) – soccer player
- Trayce Thompson (2009) – outfielder for the Boston Red Sox
- Johnny Stanton (2012) – former NFL fullback
- Max Tuerk (2012) – former NFL center
- River Cracraft (2013) – NFL wide receiver
- Griffin Canning (2014) – pitcher for the New York Mets
- Jeremy McNichols (2014) – running back for the Washington Commanders
- Katie McLaughlin (2015) – swimmer, Olympic silver medalist
- Nick Meyer (2015) – former MiLB catcher
- K.J. Costello (2016) – former NFL quarterback
- Grant Calcaterra (2017) – tight end for the Philadelphia Eagles
- Madison Curry (2019) – NWSL soccer player
- Ryan Johnson (2019) – hockey player for the Buffalo Sabres
- Anicka Delgado (2020) – swimmer, Olympian
- Hero Kanu (2022) – defensive tackle for the Texas Longhorns
- Teagan Wy (2022) – soccer player for the Gotham FC
- Jaxon Potter (2023) – quarterback for the Old Dominion Monarchs
- Emmett Mosley (2024) – wide receiver for the Texas Longhorns
- Teagan O'Dell (2025) – swimmer
- Teia Salvino (2025) – swimmer
- Trent Mosley (2026) – wide receiver for the USC Trojans
