= Creagan =

Creagan may refer to:

- Creagan (surname), an Irish surname
- Creagan railway station, former railway station in Argyll and Bute, Scotland
- Creagan na Beinne, hill in the Scottish Highlands
- An Creagán, Irish name of Creggan, County Tyrone, Northern Ireland
- the town of Dornoch in Sutherland, Scotland, as fictionalised in Rosamunde Pilcher's last novel, Winter Solstice

== See also ==
- Creaghan (disambiguation)
- Creagen Dow (born 1991), American actor
