= Kristin Lynch =

American political speechwriter

Kristin Lynch (born October 26) is an American political communications professional and speechwriter. She has held roles in journalism, political campaigns, congressional offices, and the federal government, including serving as special assistant to the president and chief speechwriter to U.S. First Lady Jill Biden from 2023 to 2024.

== Early life and education ==
Lynch was born on October 26 and her hometown is Rancho Santa Margarita, California. She graduated from Santa Margarita Catholic High School in 2001. Lynch attended Princeton University, where she earned a B.A. in history in 2005. She later completed a Master in Public Policy (MPP) at the Princeton School of Public and International Affairs in 2022.

== Career ==
Lynch began her career as a program associate at the United States Golf Association, where she worked from 2005 to 2007. She then served as a development officer at Colorado College from 2007 to 2011, focusing on institutional fundraising.

In 2011, Lynch worked as a national desk reporter for the Phnom Penh Post in Cambodia, covering regional and global issues. After returning to the United States, she transitioned to political communications. She became press secretary for U.S. senator Michael Bennet in 2012, a role she held until 2014. In the same year, she worked as press secretary for senator Mark Udall’s reelection campaign.

From 2015 to 2016, Lynch held roles with U.S. representative Jared Polis, including communications director and district communications director, managing media and constituent outreach. She served as the Colorado communications director for the Hillary Clinton 2016 presidential campaign. In 2017, Lynch joined U.S. senator Cory Booker's office, serving in roles including press secretary and communications director until 2020. Her work focused on legislative messaging, civil rights advocacy, and public outreach.

In 2021, she briefly served as senior adviser to U.S. senator John Hickenlooper, providing strategic communications guidance during his early months in office. She later joined the U.S. Department of the Treasury in 2022 as deputy assistant secretary, responsible for public communications on fiscal policy initiatives.

From August 2023 to May 2024, Lynch served as special assistant to the president and chief speechwriter to U.S. first lady Jill Biden. In this capacity, she developed speeches addressing issues including women's health, military families, and LGBTQ rights. Her work included speeches delivered at events such as White House Pride Month celebrations and LGBTQ advocacy conventions.

== Personal life ==
Lynch is Latina and part Mexican. She is a lesbian and has spoken about how her identity influences her perspective and work in politics. While in Washington, D.C., Lynch participated in community activities, including co-hosting trivia nights at a local queer bar, A League of Her Own, and playing in the DC Gay Flag Football League.
