= Carson Palmer =

American football player (born 1979)

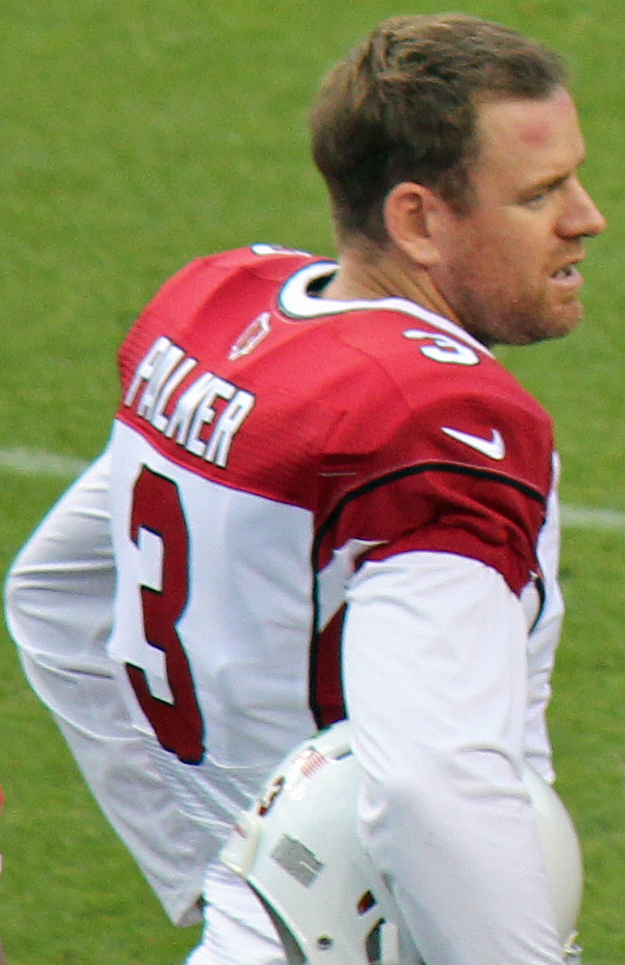
- Palmer with the Arizona Cardinals in 2015

No. 9, 3
- Position: Quarterback

Personal information
- Born: December 27, 1979 (age 46); Fresno, California, U.S.
- Listed height: 6 ft 5 in (1.96 m)
- Listed weight: 235 lb (107 kg)

Career information
- High school: Santa Margarita Catholic (Rancho Santa Margarita, California)
- College: USC (1998–2002)
- NFL draft: 2003: 1st round, 1st overall pick

Career history

Playing
- Cincinnati Bengals (2003–2010); Oakland Raiders (2011–2012); Arizona Cardinals (2013–2017)

Coaching
- Santa Margarita Catholic (2025–present) Head coach

Awards and highlights
- Second-team All-Pro (2015); 3× Pro Bowl (2005, 2006, 2015); NFL passing touchdowns leader (2005); NFL completion percentage leader (2005); Arizona Cardinals Ring of Honor; Cincinnati Bengals 40th Anniversary Team; Heisman Trophy (2002); USC Trojans No. 3 retired

Career NFL statistics
- Passing attempts: 6,307
- Passing completions: 3,941
- Completion percentage: 62.5%
- TD–INT: 294–187
- Passing yards: 46,247
- Passer rating: 87.9
- Stats at Pro Football Reference
- College Football Hall of Fame

Carson Hilton Palmer (born December 27, 1979) is an American former professional football quarterback who played in the National Football League (NFL) for 15 seasons. Palmer played college football for the USC Trojans, winning the Heisman Trophy in 2002. He was selected first overall by the Cincinnati Bengals in the 2003 NFL draft.

Palmer had a breakout season in 2005 when he led the league in passing touchdowns and completion percentage while bringing the Bengals to their first winning season and playoff appearance in 15 years. He also earned Pro Bowl honors. Palmer received a second consecutive Pro Bowl selection the following year, but was unable to continue his success and made only one more playoff appearance with Cincinnati. Amid conflicts with Bengals ownership, he was traded after eight seasons to the Oakland Raiders, where he continued to struggle during his two seasons with the team.

Traded to the Arizona Cardinals in 2013, Palmer revitalized his career. He had his most successful season in 2015 when he led the Cardinals to a division title and an NFC Championship Game appearance. Palmer was also named to his third Pro Bowl and received second-team All-Pro honors. He retired following the 2017 regular season after spending much of the year on injured reserve. Palmer was inducted to the College Football Hall of Fame in 2021.

== Early life ==
Palmer was born in Fresno, California. By the time he was in seventh grade, Palmer had remarkable size and arm strength for his age. His father, Bill Palmer, enrolled him in private classes in Orange County, where he was later taught by quarterback guru Bob Johnson.

He went on to attend Santa Margarita Catholic High School in Rancho Santa Margarita, California. At Santa Margarita High School, he played on their high school football team. As the quarterback on the freshman team, Palmer was so good that members of the varsity team halted practices to watch him play. After a successful stint as a starter his junior year, Palmer received offers from USC, Notre Dame, Colorado, Miami (Florida), and reportedly San Diego State and Northern Arizona University (where his mother attended college). He followed up a stellar junior season with a remarkable senior season, cementing himself as one of the most touted players ever to come out of Santa Margarita Catholic High School. In his senior season, he led Orange County with a 203.9 quarterback rating. He was named to the first-team all-league and All-CIF despite suffering a stress fracture in his right foot. Palmer finished his high school career with 27 school records and 2 straight CIF championships.

== College career ==
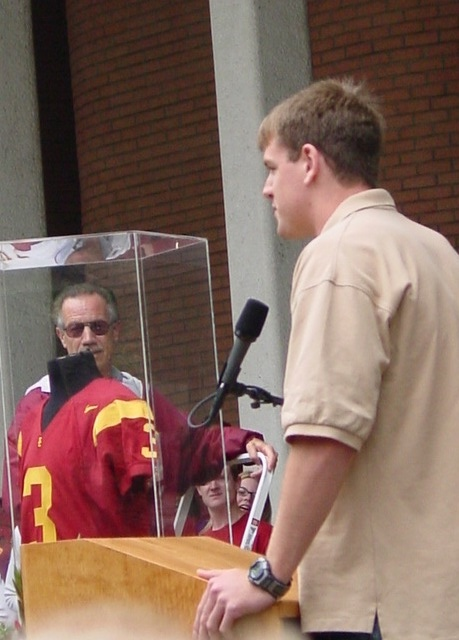
Palmer and his retired #3 jersey at USC

=== Freshman season ===
Palmer entered the University of Southern California in 1998, where he played for head coach Paul Hackett the first three years of his college career. He began the season as a back-up to Mike Van Raaphorst. They split time throughout the first 8 games, with Palmer mainly coming in during the second half. The Trojans' season opener was played against Purdue. Palmer only played for three series in the second half and went 3-of-6 and 79 passing yards. The next week, he came in at quarterback during the third quarter and threw his first career touchdown pass while playing against San Diego State. In week 4, he almost played the entire second half in a 30–10 loss to the number-10 Florida State. He bounced back the next week in a comeback win against Arizona State, finishing the game with 4 completions for 69 yards and a touchdown. In the week-8 match-up with Oregon, he came in sporadically but finished the game with a season-high 10/19 completions for 179 yards. After losing to Oregon, Palmer got his first career start the next week against Washington, making him the first true freshman quarterback to start for USC since Rob Johnson in 1991. He finished the game with 18/31 completions, 279 passing yards, and 1 touchdown. He continued as the starter the next week, racking up 19-of-26 completions, 203 yards, and a touchdown in a win against Stanford. In week 11, Palmer started against number 3 UCLA, in what was his toughest test yet. Although his team lost, he had a career-high 28/43 completions, 252 yards, and 1 passing touchdown. The Trojans won 10–0 against #9 Notre Dame in their regular season finale, with Palmer finishing with 14/32 completions, 188 passing yards, and his first career rushing touchdown. Palmer started his first career bowl game against TCU in the Sun Bowl. He was sacked 6 times and completed 17-of-28 passes, 280 passing yards, and 1 touchdown. He ended his freshman season with 130 completions, 235 attempts(55.3%), 1,755 passing yards, 116 rushing yards, 7 passing touchdowns, 6 interceptions, and a rushing touchdown.

=== Sophomore seasons ===
Going into his sophomore year in 1999, he was named the starting quarterback of the Trojans. The season opener was against Hawaii and Palmer played in a little more than two quarters. He finished the game with 14/16 completions (87.5%), 167 passing yards, 1 touchdown pass, and a 9-yard rushing touchdown. The next week against San Diego State he completed 16/24 passes for 188 passing yards and 2 touchdowns. On September 25, Palmer started the game against Oregon, throwing 9 completions for 135 yards. Before halftime, he broke his collarbone while scrambling for a 3-yard gain. This injury effectively ended his season. In only three games he had 39/53 completions (73.6%), 490 passing yards, 3 passing touchdowns, 3 interceptions, and a single rushing touchdown. The NCAA let him use his redshirt, although he had already played in 3 games.

After being sidelined for the last 11 months, Palmer returned to his starting role in 2000. He made his return in week 1 against #22 Penn State, going for 10/20 completions for 87 yards and an interception. The following game, Palmer led the Trojans 72-yards down the field with 1:14 left in the fourth quarter. This set up the game-winning field goal against Colorado, putting USC up 17–14. He threw for 25/30(83.3%), 275 passing yards, and a touchdown. The very next week he led another comeback win against San Jose State, bringing USC back from a 12-point deficit in the fourth quarter. Palmer ended the game with 22/38 completions, a career-high 338 passing yards, and 2 touchdowns. After 5 consecutive losses, he started in week 10 against Arizona State and end the game with 22 of 37 completions, for 279 passing yards, 2 touchdowns, and 2 interceptions in the double overtime victory. Palmer started the first half the next game against the Washington and was benched the second half for Mike Van Raaphorst, after going 12 of 26 for 145 yards and an interception. After being benched, he returned against rival UCLA the next game, and had a career-high 350 yards, and 4 touchdowns while throwing 26/37 completions. His performance against the Bruins won him PAC-10 Offensive Player of the Week and USC's Game MVP. In the regular season finale, against Notre Dame, he completed 17 of 35 passes for 251 yards, 2 passing touchdowns, 2 interceptions, and lead USC with 22-yards rushing and 1 rushing touchdown. USC finished the season with a 5–7 record and Palmer finished with 228 completions, 414 attempts(54.9%) 2914 passing yards, 16 touchdowns, and 18 interceptions.

=== Junior season ===
Following a 6–6 record in 1999 and a 5–7 record in 2000, Paul Hackett stepped down as head coach. 2001 marked Pete Carroll's first season with USC and under a new revamped offense, Palmer threw 21/28 completions, 213 passing yards, and an interception in the season opener against San Jose State. During a week 4 loss at Oregon, he threw 25/40 completions, for a career-high 411 yards, 3 interceptions, and a career-high 75-yard touchdown pass and a 93-yard touchdown pass. After four consecutive losses, where he threw a total of 4 touchdowns and 5 interceptions, USC finally received a win against Arizona State with Palmer going 18/26 for 295 passing yards and 3 touchdowns. The next week at Notre Dame, although being sacked 5 times, he finished with 19 of 30 completions, 230 passing yards, 2 touchdowns, and 2 interceptions. Palmer defeated Oregon State in week 10, after going 21 of 28, for 171 passing yards, and an interception. The game came down to overtime, where Palmer bootlegged for a 4-yard scramble, broke one tackle, and dove at the pylon for the game-winning touchdown. After 4 wins in-a-row, USC lost to Utah, and Palmer finished the game with 15 of 26 completions for 150 yards. Although his first season under new head coach Pete Carroll ended with a 6–6 record, he finished his season with 221 completions, 377 attempts(58.6%), 2,717 passing yards, 13 passing touchdowns, and 12 interceptions in 12 starts.

=== Senior season ===
After proving himself to be one of the nation's top college quarterbacks his junior year, Palmer returned to USC for a fifth year in 2002. He resumed the role of starting quarterback for the fourth consecutive year and was voted the team captain. He finished the season opener against Auburn with 23 of 32 completions, 302 passing yards, 1 passing touchdown, and 2 interceptions in a 24–17 victory. With only 1:26 seconds to go in the fourth quarter, he ran the ball in for a 1-yard touchdown on a quarterback sneak to win the game. USC matched up against #25 Kansas State in week 3, and Palmer became USC's career leader in passing yards and completions after completing 18 of 46 passes for 186 yards and a touchdown. He came back in week 7 to throw 21 of 34 completions for 348 passing yards and 4 passing touchdowns against #19 Washington. Palmer then had a record-setting day the next week against #14 Oregon when he broke the school records with 31/42 completions(73.8%), 448 passing yards, and tied the record with 5 passing touchdowns. In week 11 against #25 UCLA, he racked up 19/32 completions for 254 passing yards and 4 passing touchdowns, winning his third PAC-10 Offensive Player of the Week for the 2002 season and becoming the career leader for passes, completions, and attempts in the PAC-10. He returned the next game to throw another 4 touchdowns, while also throwing the most yards ever (425) against Notre Dame. He played his last collegiate game in the 2003 Orange Bowl against #3 Iowa, finishing with 21 of 31 completions, 303 passing yards, and a touchdown, while also being named the game's MVP.

==== Heisman Trophy ====
Palmer finished his last season with a total of 309 completions, 489 attempts(63.2%), 3,942 passing yards, 33 touchdown passes, and 10 interceptions while also breaking the school record for most completions, passing yards, and passing touchdowns in a season. He was voted the winner of the 2002 Heisman Award, outpacing Iowa's Brad Banks and Penn State's Larry Johnson. Palmer was the fifth player and first quarterback from USC to win the award. After five years at USC, he finished his career with 72 passing touchdowns, 49 interceptions, 927 completions, 1,569 attempts, and 11,818 passing yards. He also ended up being the Pac-10's career leader for completions, attempts, and passing yards.

== Professional career ==
Pre-draft measurables
Height	Weight	Arm length	Hand span	40-yard dash	Wonderlic
6 ft 5 in (1.96 m)	232 lb (105 kg)	32 3/4 in (0.83 m)	9 1/2 in (0.24 m)	4.65 s	26
All values from NFL Combine

=== Cincinnati Bengals ===
==== 2003 season ====
On July 23, 2003, Palmer signed a six-year contract worth $42.69 million after being selected first overall by the Cincinnati Bengals. Unlike most quarterbacks drafted first overall, Palmer did not play at all during his rookie season; instead, he learned the position during games and in practice under head coach Marvin Lewis and quarterbacks coach Ken Zampese. Veteran quarterback Jon Kitna, who signed with the Bengals as an unrestricted free agent in 2001, took every snap during the 2003 season.

==== 2004 season ====
After learning the position during his rookie season, Palmer was given the starting quarterback position for the 2004 season and started 13 games; the Bengals finished that season 8–8.

Palmer made his NFL debut in Week 1 against the New York Jets. Palmer completed 18 of 27 passes for 248 yards and two touchdowns, but threw a costly interception late as the Jets held on to beat the Bengals, 31–24. "We came here expecting to win," Palmer said. "We had what we needed. We had what we wanted. We had the ball with two minutes to go in good field position and I turned it over. I can't make plays like that for us to win."

Over the next three weeks, Palmer struggled. In Week 2, he completed 21 of 38 passes for just 147 yards, no touchdowns, and an interception, but nonetheless recorded his first win as a starter over the Miami Dolphins. In Week 3, he completed 25 of 52 passes for 316 passing yards, but was picked off 3 times and lost a fumble in the 23–9 loss to the Baltimore Ravens. "You can't get greedy," Palmer said. "When you're a young quarterback, you get greedy, and I have to fight that temptation. You need to develop patience. When something isn't there, you don't just throw it up in the air." In Week 4, Palmer was 20/37 for 164 yards with a touchdown but 2 costly interceptions as the Bengals lost 28–17 to a powerful Pittsburgh Steelers team. Palmer went into the Bengals' week 5 bye with statistics of 84–154 for 875 yards with only three passing touchdowns against 11 sacks, eight total turnovers (seven interceptions and a lost fumble), and three straight games with passer rating of less than 60. The Bengals, meanwhile, were 1–3 and in last place in the AFC North.

Palmer's performance improved from this low point, though it seesawed over the next five weeks. His rating was in the 60s in Weeks 6 (34–17 loss to the Cleveland Browns), 8 (27–20 loss to the Tennessee Titans), and 10 (17–10 win against the Washington Redskins), interspersed by a solid 85.0 in a Week 7 win over the Denver Broncos, and 94.8 in a win over the Dallas Cowboys, where he also rushed for a touchdown. In that stretch, Palmer averaged 204 yards per game with four touchdowns and five interceptions. After two touchdowns in a loss to Pittsburgh, in Week 12 Palmer threw a career high four touchdowns along three interceptions and 251 passing yards in a 58–48 shootout win over the Browns (106 points was the second most points in an NFL game). "We kept putting them away, and they kept coming back," said Palmer. "We kept expecting them to slacken up, but they never did." In Week 13, Palmer threw for a career high 382 passing yards and 3 touchdown passes, including a 32-yard pass to T. J. Houshmandzadeh and a 22-yard pass to Chad Johnson to set up Shayne Graham's game-winning field goal with 2 seconds left in the game.

In Week 14, Palmer's passer rating was above 100 for the third consecutive week when he sprained his knee in the third quarter. He missed the rest of the season and first put on the knee brace he wore for much of the rest of his career. His injury-shortened season ended with 18 touchdowns, 18 interceptions, and 2,897 yards.

==== 2005 season ====
In 2005, the Palmer-led Bengals ended 15 years of futility by notching their first winning season since 1990 and winning the AFC North division with an 11–5 record.

Statistically, Palmer had a stellar season, throwing a league-high 32 touchdown passes and leading the league in completion percentage. He became the first Bengals quarterback to finish with a quarterback rating over 100 and he also tied Indianapolis' Peyton Manning for most consecutive games, 9, with a triple-digit quarterback rating.

In Week 1, Palmer completed 26 of 34 passes and 2 passing touchdowns against the Cleveland Browns. The Bengals won the game 27–13. In Week 2, Palmer had another great game, throwing for 337 yards to go along with 3 passing touchdowns and an interception against the Minnesota Vikings. Palmer threw 3 more touchdown passes in Week 3 against the Chicago Bears to improve to 3–0. That was the first time the Bengals have started the season 3–0 since 1990.

In Week 4, Palmer again had a rating over 100 in a game against the Houston Texans. Against the Jacksonville Jaguars in Week 5, Carson completed 22 out of 33 passes for 239 yards and 2 touchdowns. However, the Bengals lost their first game of the year, 23–20. The Bengals bounced back against the Tennessee Titans in Week 6. Palmer threw for 272 passing yards and 2 more passing touchdowns. His rating was over 100 for the ninth straight game dating back to last season. "He feels like he's invincible, but right now he knows he can go win it the next play," Cincinnati coach Marvin Lewis said of his quarterback. "He doesn't have to win it on every play. And I think that says a lot for how he is and how important he is to this football team."

Palmer's consecutive games streak of over a 100 quarterback rating ended in Week 7 against the Pittsburgh Steelers. Palmer completed 21 of 36 passes for 227 yards but was picked off 2 times and for the first time all season, failed to throw at least a touchdown in a game. "It wasn't anything in particular they did," said Palmer, who had a measly 53.8 passer rating for the game. "I just didn't play well enough to win. I gave them two turnovers. When you play a championship team, you can't do that."

Palmer bounced back in Week 8 against the Green Bay Packers. He threw for 3 touchdown passes and an interception for 237 yards and the Bengals won the game, 21–14.

In Week 9, Palmer passed for 248 yards and 2 touchdowns as the Bengals won their game against the Baltimore Ravens. Palmer finished the season with a 101.1 rating.

Carson signed a six-year contract extension through the 2014 season with the Bengals on December 29, 2005. In addition to the three years remaining on his existing deal, the value of the extension was worth $118.75 million over nine years. "Hopefully this is the last place I'll end up playing," Palmer said. "That's so rare in this league these days. It's so rare to see a person have a 5-, 8-, 10-, 12-year career in one place. And I feel very fortunate that it looks like that's going to be my future."

On January 8, 2006, the Bengals met their division rival Pittsburgh in the first round of the AFC playoffs at Paul Brown Stadium in Cincinnati. On the Bengals' first pass play, Carson Palmer threw a 66-yard pass to rookie receiver Chris Henry. It was the longest completion in Bengals playoff history. After Palmer released the pass, Steelers defensive tackle Kimo von Oelhoffen dove laterally into Palmer's left knee. Forty minutes later, a magnetic resonance imaging test revealed a severe injury, thought to be career-threatening at the time; Palmer had tears of both the anterior cruciate and medial collateral ligaments as well as cartilage and meniscus damage, and a displaced kneecap. Coincidentally, Henry himself suffered a knee injury on the same play, though far less severe. With Palmer out of the game, the Steelers went on to win 31–17 en route to their Super Bowl XL victory over the Seattle Seahawks.

During the off-season, the league's Rules Committee modified the rule regarding low hits on quarterbacks. The so-called "Carson Palmer Rule" which resulted requires that defenders take every opportunity to avoid hitting a quarterback at or below the knees when the quarterback is in a defenseless position looking to throw with both feet on the ground, unless they are blocked into him.

==== Rehabilitation ====
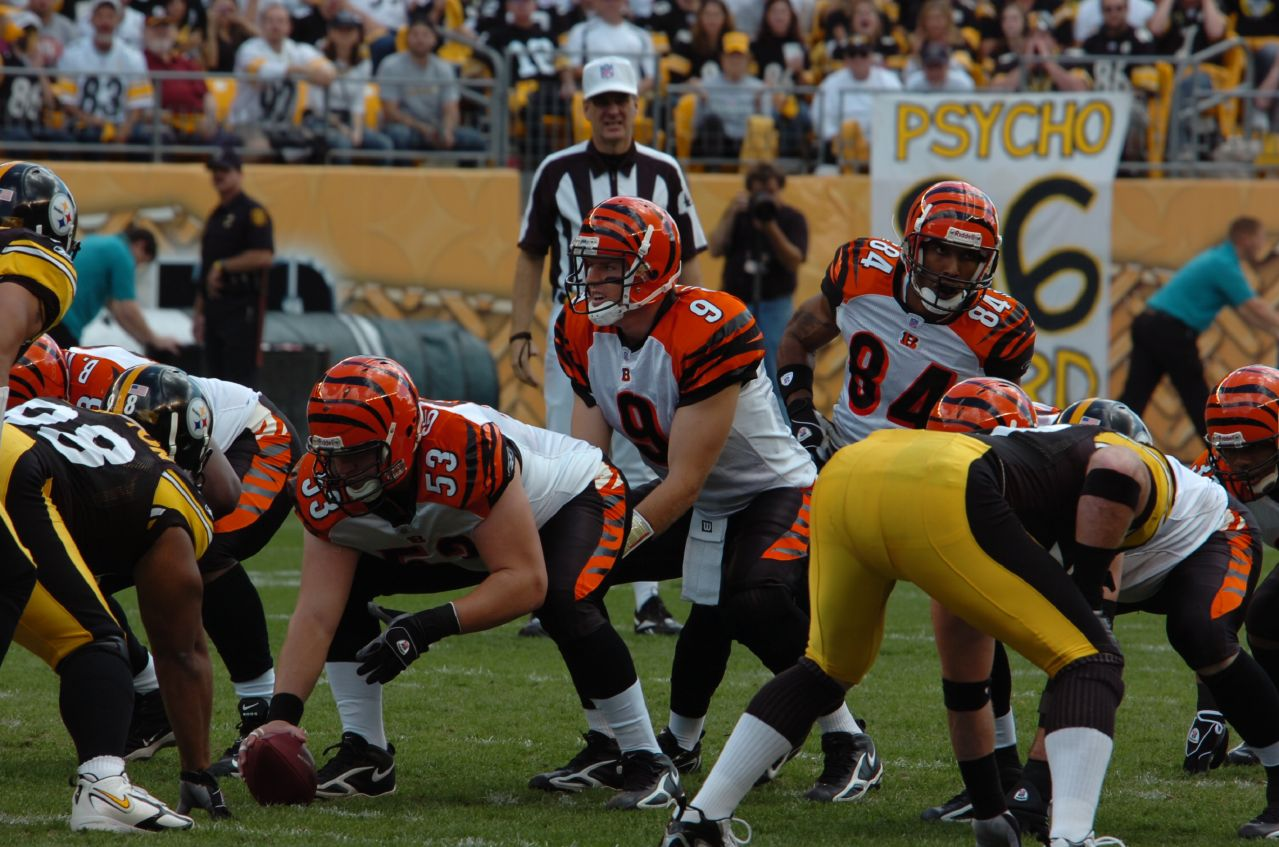
Palmer under center against the Pittsburgh Steelers

Palmer underwent reconstructive surgery on his injured knee in Houston, Texas, on January 10, 2006. Lonnie Paulos, a surgeon who was independent of the Bengals, performed the operation. Initially, the Bengals organization stated that Palmer had torn the anterior cruciate and medial collateral ligaments with no other damage. However, Paulos later told the Associated Press that the damage was more extensive and also included a dislocation of the patella. Paulos called the injury "devastating and potentially career-ending". The Bengals accepted Paulos's assessment. Palmer's knee was reconstructed using an Achilles tendon from a 44-year-old woman who was killed by a drunk driver nearly two years before Palmer's injury.

Nonetheless, Palmer vowed that he was to be the starting quarterback in the Bengals' regular season opener at Kansas City on September 10, 2006. Bengals head coach Marvin Lewis stated, "This is a serious injury, but we are told the procedure went very well. We know Carson, and we know he will apply himself fully to his rehabilitation. This result encourages our feeling that Carson will be ready to open the 2006 season as our starting quarterback."

During his rehabilitation, Palmer made several other pointed comments, particularly in an issue of Sports Illustrated. In the article, Palmer stated that: "I hate the Steelers more than I hate UCLA."

==== 2006 season ====
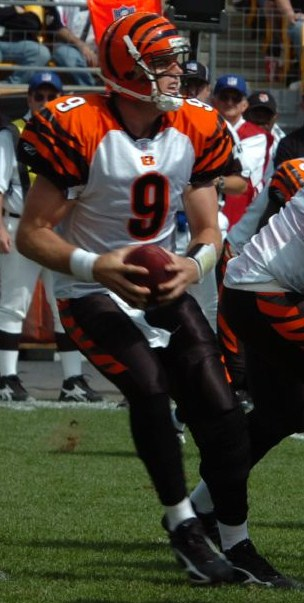
Palmer playing against the Pittsburgh Steelers in 2006

Palmer returned from his injury in time for the 2006 preseason. After the Bengals' 48–17 pre-season victory over the visiting Green Bay Packers on August 28, 2006, which saw Palmer complete 9 of 14 passes for 140 yards and three touchdowns in just less than two quarters of play in his much-expected debut (which included an 11-yard run for a first down that culminated in a slide on his surgically repaired left knee), Palmer reiterated his position that he was to start in the Bengals' season opener at Kansas City.

His performance drew rave reviews from many experts, many of whom expected far less of him less than a year after such a serious injury. ESPN analyst Joe Theismann, himself a former quarterback with the Washington Redskins (whose own career was ended by a gruesome broken leg against the New York Giants on November 18, 1985), praised Palmer for his mental toughness in taking hits and not being gun-shy about staying in the pocket where chances of injury are often high.

Palmer ended up starting all 16 of the Bengals' regular season games, missing only one snap, due to his getting the wind knocked out of him. He did not become totally comfortable with his repaired knee until Week 9 against the San Diego Chargers when he threw for a career high of 440 yards. Despite his previous injury, he passed the 4,000 yard mark for the first time in his career, finishing the season with a franchise record 4,035 passing yards and 28 touchdowns, only 13 interceptions and 93.9 rating. He also made the Pro Bowl for the second year in a row, becoming the first Bengals quarterback to do this since Boomer Esiason in 1988 and 1989. Palmer was named Most Outstanding Player at the Pro Bowl, leading the AFC down the field in the final two minutes for the win. He completed 8 of 17 passes for 190 yards and 2 touchdowns, one to his Bengals teammate Chad Johnson. Palmer placed 3rd in voting for NFL Comeback Player of the Year, behind Drew Brees and Chad Pennington. Unfortunately, his team suffered quite a few misfortunes, such as missed point afters and field goals, while slipping from an 11–5 record in 2005 to 8–8 in 2006 and failing to make the playoffs due to a game 16 loss against their rivals, the Pittsburgh Steelers.

After winning the Pro Bowl MVP, Palmer declared, "This is a huge honor and extremely exciting and I feel very blessed just to be here, let alone for the outcome to be this. But my goal's to be in a Super Bowl. And to win a Super Bowl. That's where my mind's at, and after this week I'm going to start focusing on that again." During the 2007 off-season, Palmer had scheduled workouts with not only Chad Johnson (which he usually did), but wide receivers T. J. Houshmandzadeh and Tab Perry. He also said he was fully comfortable with his knee.

==== 2007 season ====
In the season opener on Monday Night Football against their divisional rival Baltimore Ravens, Palmer went 20 for 32 with 194 yards and two touchdowns in a 27–20 win. He followed up this performance with 33 completions for 401 passing yards and a franchise record and also a career-high six touchdown passes the next week in a game against the Cleveland Browns, but lost 51–45. Cleveland quarterback Derek Anderson also threw for five touchdown passes in the game. It was only the third time in NFL history that two quarterbacks had thrown at least five touchdown passes in the same game. In a 24–21 loss to the Seattle Seahawks, Palmer went 27 for 43 for 342 yards for a touchdown, but also threw two interceptions.

By Week 8, Palmer and the Bengals were struggling. His team had only a 2–5 record and he had thrown 9 interceptions, the most by any quarterback in the AFC. However, he remained statistically productive, ranking fourth in the NFL in passing yards and fifth in touchdowns with a passer rating of over 90.

The Bengals' misfortunes continued throughout the season and a week 15 loss to the San Francisco 49ers ensured that the team finished the season with a losing record for the first time since he had been their starting quarterback. In the same game, Palmer threw his 100th career touchdown pass, becoming the 5th fastest player ever to reach this milestone (59 games). Palmer finished the season with 376 completions for 4,131 yards and 26 touchdowns, with 20 interceptions. His 20 interceptions were a career high, but his 373 completions and 4,131 passing yards set new Bengals franchise records.

==== 2008 season ====
In the season opener against the Baltimore Ravens, Palmer was held to 99 yards and no touchdowns, completing only 10 out of 25 passes with an interception. For the first time in his career, Palmer wore a clear protective visor because of a broken nose. In the following 24–7 loss to the Tennessee Titans, Palmer went 16 of 27 for 134 yards and two interceptions. As the Bengals fell to 0–3 against the New York Giants in a 26–23 overtime loss, Palmer went 27 for 39 for 286 yards and a touchdown.

Due to a sore elbow, Palmer missed the next game against the Cleveland Browns, which ended in a loss. This ended Palmer's consecutive start streak of 51 games. Palmer returned the following week against the Dallas Cowboys and completed 23 of 39 passes for 217 yards, two touchdowns, and an interception on the first passing play of the game.

The cause of Palmer's sore elbow was later diagnosed as a partially torn ligament and tendon and he was shelved for the remainder of the season. Palmer elected not to undergo Tommy John surgery to repair the damage; instead, he chose to rest the elbow to allow it to heal. By March 2009, Palmer said that he was "100 percent" again.

==== 2009 season ====
In the season opener against the Denver Broncos, Palmer threw the ball 33 times for 247 yards and two interceptions in a 12–7 loss. The critics sought another mediocre season for the Bengals, with a lack of offensive production. The offense bounced back in week 2 against the Green Bay Packers. Palmer threw for 185 yards, three touchdowns, and two interceptions in a 31–24 win. In week 7 against the Chicago Bears, Palmer went 20 of 24 with five touchdowns and a passer rating of 146.7, in a 45–10 win. This win improved the Bengals' record to 5–2. After a 16–7 win against the Cleveland Browns in Week 12, the Bengals swept their division for the first time in franchise history. Going into a Week 15 game against the San Diego Chargers, Bengals' receiver Chris Henry died. Playing with a heavy heart, Palmer threw for 314 yards, two touchdowns, and one interception, only to lose on a last second field goal by the Chargers. Palmer had a 91.7 passer rating with two touchdowns and one interception in a 17–10 Week 16 win against the Kansas City Chiefs. This win assured the Bengals' first winning season and division title since 2005. In Palmer's first full playoff game, he struggled. Palmer threw the ball with a 50% completion percentage, one touchdown, one interception, and a 53.8 passer rating, in a 24–14 loss to the New York Jets. Palmer finished the 2009 season with a 60.5% completion percentage, 3,094 yards passing, 21 touchdowns, 13 interceptions, and a passer rating of 83.6.

==== 2010 season ====
In the 2010 NFL draft, the Bengals drafted three more receivers for Palmer: Oklahoma tight end Jermaine Gresham in the first round, Texas wide receiver Jordan Shipley in the third round, and Kansas wide receiver Dezmon Briscoe in the sixth round. During OTA's (Organized Team Activities), Palmer asserted himself as the leader of the team by calling out Chad Ochocinco, saying that the number one receiver should be there with the team.

During the Hall of Fame Game in Canton, Ohio, Palmer completed 2 out of 5 passes for 18 yards, both to wide receiver Terrell Owens. Palmer and the Bengals started out the 2010 campaign with a 2–1 record, but faltered after that, going on a 10-game losing streak to finish out the season with a 4–12 record. Statistically, Palmer improved from the previous year as his attempts, completion percentage, yardage and touchdown numbers all rose; however, he also threw more interceptions.

==== Initial retirement ====
Following the Bengals' 4–12 finish in the 2010 season, Palmer requested to be traded. Bengals president Mike Brown turned down Palmer's request the next day. News reports said that Palmer was prepared to retire if necessary. WCPO-TV reported that a friend of Palmer quoted him as saying, "I will never set foot in Paul Brown Stadium again. I have $80 million in the bank." Palmer also reportedly said: "I don't have to play football for money. I'll play it for the love of the game, but that would have to be elsewhere." Palmer's agent said, "Because of the lack of success that Carson and the Bengals have experienced together, Carson strongly feels that a separation between him and the Bengals would be in the best interest of both parties." In seven seasons under Palmer, the Bengals appeared in the playoffs twice (2005 and 2009), and did not win any playoff games.

During an interview at the 2011 NFL draft, head coach Marvin Lewis said that Palmer told him he has planned to retire. In response, the Bengals selected TCU quarterback Andy Dalton in the second round. On July 26, 2011, a video posted on NFL.com showed a press conference held by Mike Brown, the president of the Bengals, stating that he did not expect Palmer to return to the Bengals for the 2011 season, the organization wished him well, and that there were no plans to trade him. When asked why he refused to trade Palmer, Mike Brown answered:

Carson signed a contract. He made a commitment. He gave his word. We relied on his word. We relied on his commitment. We expected him to perform here. He's going to walk away from his commitment. We aren't going to reward him for doing it.

Consequently, Palmer was placed on the reserve/did not report list on July 29, 2011, after failing to report to training camp.

=== Oakland Raiders ===
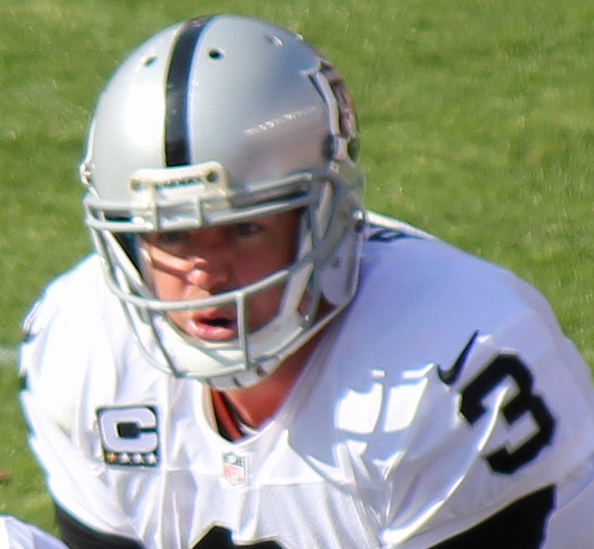
Palmer in Denver with the Oakland Raiders in September 2012

==== 2011 season ====
With Bengals rookie quarterback Andy Dalton having led his team to a conference-best 6–2 record after 9 weeks, the Bengals had little motivation to negotiate for Palmer's return. However, on October 18, 2011, after being contacted by the Oakland Raiders who had just lost starting quarterback Jason Campbell for the season and who were desperate to negotiate for Palmer, the Bengals agreed to trade the disgruntled quarterback. Raiders head coach Hue Jackson was previously the offensive coordinator and quarterbacks coach at USC and helped recruit Palmer, and was also the Bengals wide receivers coach during the prime of Palmer's career. Jackson's good relationship with both Palmer and the Bengals organization was key to the deal. In exchange for a player whom the Bengals did not need and who stated he'd never suit up for them again, the Bengals received Oakland's first-round pick in the 2012 draft and a conditional second-round pick in the 2013 draft, which became a first-round pick had the Raiders reached the AFC Championship game in 2011. Cincinnati later used the picks to select Alabama cornerback Dre Kirkpatrick in 2012 and North Carolina running back Gio Bernard in 2013. The trade was deemed one of the most one-sided trades in recent memory, and it was one of the factors that resulted in Jackson's termination after the season. Dalton went on to lead the Bengals to the playoffs and was selected to the Pro Bowl, while Jackson was soon re-hired by the Bengals as an assistant coach. Palmer then signed a new four-year contract worth $43 million.

With punter Shane Lechler wearing Palmer's number 9 from Cincinnati, Palmer switched his jersey number to 3, his number at USC which was worn by Jon Kitna in Cincinnati at the time the Bengals drafted him. On October 23, Palmer came off the bench against the Kansas City Chiefs to relieve starting quarterback Kyle Boller who had thrown 3 interceptions and had the team down 21–0. Palmer completed 8 of 21 passes for 116 yards and 3 interceptions in his Raider debut. He stated after the game, "I was told I was not going to play. I didn't know the offense, I also hadn't been training and working out, so it was a complete shock to me at halftime when (Raiders coach Hue Jackson) told me, 'Hey, you know we're going to get you in, in the third quarter.'" In his first start for the Raiders two weeks later, Palmer threw for over 330 yards and three touchdowns. He also threw three interceptions and lost a fumble.

In his second start as a Raider during the Week 11 Thursday Night game against the division rival San Diego Chargers, Palmer showed further progress as he finished the game completing 14 of 20 passes for 299 yards and threw two touchdowns and a single interception for a quarterback rating of 125.0 in a 24–17 road win that ultimately gave the Raiders the lead in the division. After going 0 for 2, Palmer completed 10 straight passes, including two touchdowns of 33 & 26 yards to rookie wide receiver Denarius Moore. Palmer was on course for a perfect passer rating of 158.3 until he took a hit from Chargers' linebacker Travis LaBoy while attempting a pass early in the fourth quarter that resulted in wobbly pass picked-off by Paul Oliver.

The Raiders ended the season 8–8, 4–5 under Palmer. They lost the AFC West tiebreaker to the Denver Broncos and finished one game out of the playoffs.

==== 2012 season ====
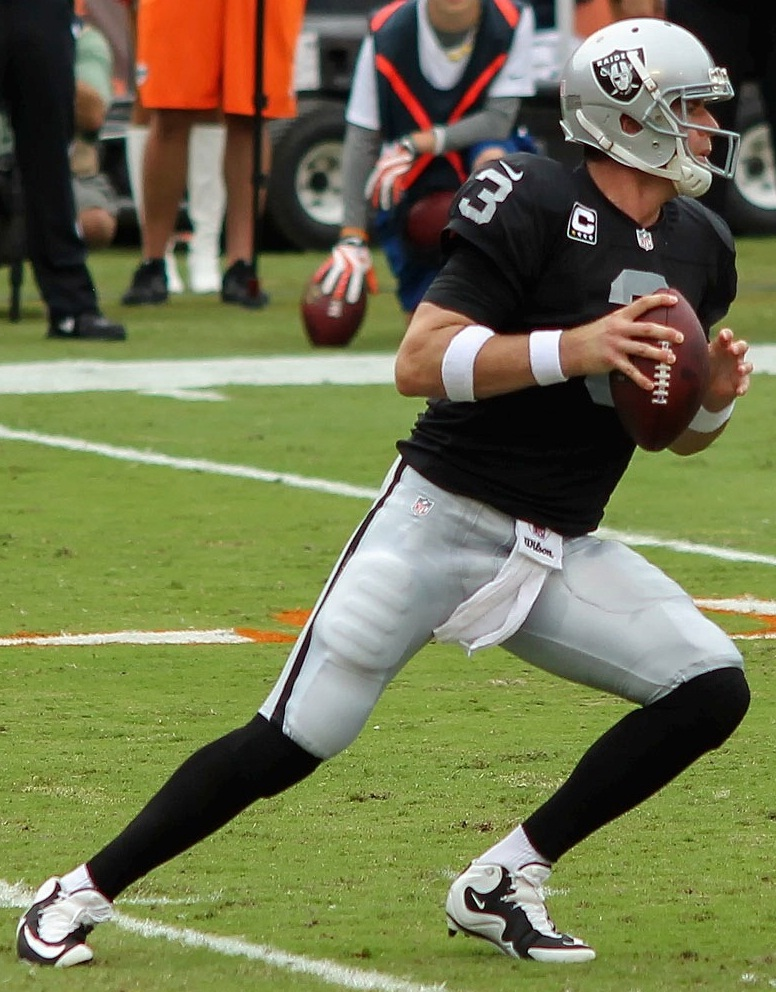
Palmer on September 16, 2012, against the Miami Dolphins

In 2012, the Palmer-led Raiders started the season 0–1 after a 22–14 home loss against the San Diego Chargers. Palmer had a good game statistically going 32 of 46 for 297 yards and a touchdown. In Week 2, Palmer completed 24 of 48 (50%) passes for 373 yards and a touchdown, but also an interception in a 35–13 loss to the Miami Dolphins. The Raiders returned home for a Week 3 matchup against their longtime historic rival Pittsburgh Steelers. Sitting at 0–2, Palmer drove the Raiders down the field in the final seconds to set up a field goal attempt for the Raiders to win. Palmer went near perfect in his pass attempts completing 24 of 34 for 3 touchdowns and an interception in the 34–31 win. In Week 4 however, Palmer struggled against the Denver Broncos going 19 of 34 for 202 yards in a 37–6 road loss.

The Raiders went into their bye week with Palmer's stats standing at 99 of 162 pass attempts for 1,081 yards, 5 touchdowns, 2 interceptions. The Raiders (who had finished 4–5 with Palmer as a starter) had also gone 5–8 with Palmer at the starting quarterback helm by this time. Returning from the bye week, Palmer and the Raiders traveled down south to face the Atlanta Falcons who were undefeated against AFC opponents. The Raiders got off to a good start with Palmer looking very sharp with 23 of 33 for 353 yards and a touchdown, but he also threw an interception as the Falcons completed the comeback drive to win 23–20. Palmer went 26 of 46 for 298 yards, a touchdown, an interception, and also a rushing touchdown against the Jacksonville Jaguars a week later. Palmer stayed sharp through the next game at Kansas City against the Chiefs, going 14 of 28 for 209 yards, 2 touchdowns, and an interception in a 26–16 win. A week later, the Raiders returned home for a game against the Tampa Bay Buccaneers. Despite the fact that Palmer went 39 of 61 for 414 yards and 4 touchdowns, the struggling quarterback also threw 3 costly interceptions in the 42–32 loss. A week later at Baltimore, Palmer still looked sharp in the 55–20 road loss to the Baltimore Ravens going 29 of 45 for 368 yards, 2 touchdowns, and an interception. In Week 11, the Raiders returned home for a game against a struggling defensive New Orleans Saints team. However, despite the fact that Palmer and the Raiders' offense struggled, the quarterback went 22 of 40 for 312 yards, 2 touchdowns, and 2 interceptions in the huge 38–17 loss.

Palmer returned to Paul Brown Stadium to face off against his former team, the Cincinnati Bengals, on November 25. The Cincinnati fans greeted Palmer poorly, booing their former quarterback as he went out for the coin toss. A sign in the upper deck read "Winners Never Quit", referencing Palmer's instance that he would never play for the Bengals again. Palmer struggled in this game going 19 of 34 for a season-low 146 yards, a touchdown, and an interception in a 34–10 loss. In Week 13, the Raiders returned home for a game against the Cleveland Browns. Coming into this game at 1–2 against the AFC North, the Raiders were down by 3, but ended up losing 20–17 to the Browns despite the fact that Palmer was 34 of 54 for 351 yards, 2 touchdowns, and an interception. In Week 14, the Raiders stayed home for a Thursday Night Football game against the Denver Broncos. The Raiders lost 26–13 in spite of Palmer going 19 of 30 for 273 yards, 2 touchdowns, and an interception. This game was his 9th straight game with at least 1 interception. In Week 15, the Raiders stayed home for the 3rd straight week for game 2 against the division rival Kansas City Chiefs, in which they won 15–0, with Palmer's streak of games with at least 1 interception coming to an end, but he still struggled as he went 18 of 29 for 182 yards. In Week 16, Palmer and the Raiders traveled to Charlotte, North Carolina, to take on the Carolina Panthers. Palmer early in the game suffered a further injury of his ribs, leaving him out for the rest of the game. As he went 3 of 3 for 31 yards in the game, quarterback Matt Leinart took over for the rest of the game. The Raiders, however, went on to lose by a score of 17–6. Out of the 14 games Palmer started and completed that year, the Raiders went 4–11 with him, bringing his total to 8–15 as the teams' starting quarterback.

=== Arizona Cardinals ===
==== 2013 season ====
Palmer was officially traded to the Arizona Cardinals on April 2, 2013, for a 2013 sixth round draft pick and a conditional pick in the 2014 NFL draft. He then signed a two-year restructured contract worth $16 million. His new head coach was Bruce Arians, the former Colts interim coach, who had led the Indianapolis Colts while Chuck Pagano was recovering from cancer treatment. He was also paired with the team's star wide receiver Larry Fitzgerald. While having a rusty 3–4 start, Palmer led the Cardinals to a 10–6 record his first year but was eliminated from playoff contention in week 17. Palmer ranked 8th in the NFL in passing yards with 4,274 yards, the most of his career. He also became the first player in NFL history to top 4,000 yards passing for three different teams. During week 11, he was nominated for FedEx Air Player of the Week with 419 yards and two touchdowns. This win over the Jacksonville Jaguars ended Carson Palmer's interception streak through the first 9 games of his season (not including the bye week). During Week 14, Palmer hit a career high with an 84.4 completion percentage when he went 27 for 32 with 269 yards and a touchdown in a 30–10 win over the St. Louis Rams. During Week 16, while he threw four interceptions, two to Richard Sherman, he was able to rally the Cardinals to a 17–10 victory over the Seattle Seahawks, who had a perfect home record for the last two years.

==== 2014 season ====
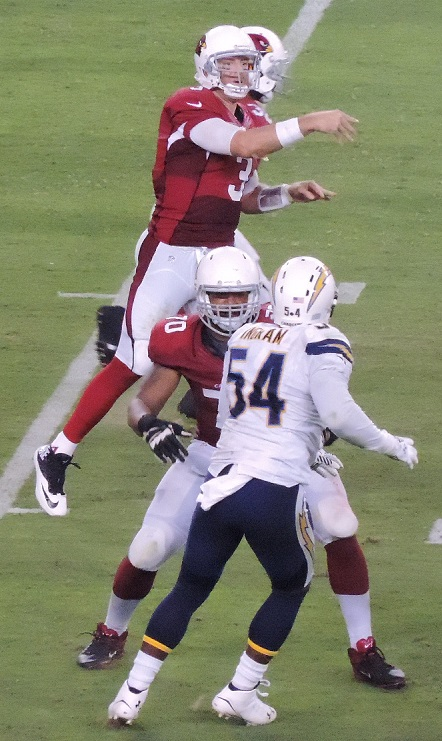
Palmer in 2014 vs. the Chargers

In Week 1 against the San Diego Chargers, Palmer threw two touchdowns late in the game to win in an upset. In the same game, Palmer ran for a career-high 30 yards and got injured running for a first down. Instead of avoiding safety Eric Weddle, Palmer collided with him. He missed the next three games, in which backup Drew Stanton won against the New York Giants and San Francisco 49ers and lost to the Denver Broncos. Upon his return the Cardinals went on to win five games in a row and remain the top seed in the NFC, with Palmer throwing 11 touchdowns to just 3 interceptions. On November 7, 2014, Palmer agreed to a three-year, $49.5 million contract extension with the Cardinals. On November 9, 2014, Palmer re-tore his ACL in a game against the St. Louis Rams. He was placed on the injured reserve list the next day, ending his season. Palmer underwent surgery in which doctors removed the donated Achilles tendon from his knee and replaced it with his own patellar tendon for reconstruction. The Cardinals went on to start Stanton for the remainder of the season until he too suffered a knee injury against the Rams in December. The Cardinals then started Ryan Lindley for the remainder of the season. The Cardinals finished 11–5 and went into the playoffs as a Wild Card, but lost to the Carolina Panthers in the first round, mustering only 78 yards of total offense while missing their starting and backup quarterback, starting and backup running back, starting left outside linebacker, and starting middle linebacker due to injury or suspension.

==== 2015 season ====
Palmer engineered what many considered his best season by recording 35 touchdowns and 11 interceptions, and was 13–3 as a starter through the 2015 season, winning the NFC West and securing the Cardinals' first first-round bye in the playoffs. Many in the sports world considered Palmer a candidate for the NFL's 2015 MVP award, along with Tom Brady, Russell Wilson, and eventual winner Cam Newton. Palmer was also elected to his third Pro Bowl. In Week 10, towards the end of a 39–32 win over the division rival Seattle Seahawks, Palmer made a crotch chop gesture to the Seattle fans; he pumped his fist twice and followed it up by pointing at his crotch. Later in the week, he was fined $11,576 for the action. Palmer set a franchise record with the Cardinals against the Minnesota Vikings in Week 14, throwing his 31st touchdown, passing Kurt Warner. In the same game, the Cardinals clinched a playoff berth. After defeating the Philadelphia Eagles the following week, he and the Cardinals clinched the NFC West. In Week 16 against the Packers, Palmer and the Cardinals secured a first round bye in the playoffs by clinching the 2nd seed in the NFC, behind only the 15–1 Panthers. In 16 starts, Palmer threw for a franchise record 4,671 yards with 35 touchdowns. In the NFC Divisional Round, Palmer completed 25 of 41 passes for 349 yards, 3 touchdowns, and 2 interceptions in the Cardinals' 26–20 overtime win in a Week 16 rematch against the Green Bay Packers, earning his first and only career playoff win in the process. The Cardinals lost the NFC Championship game 49–15 to the Carolina Panthers, a game where Palmer threw four interceptions and lost two fumbles. Palmer lost the MVP award to Newton, who received 48 out of 50 votes while Palmer and Brady received one vote each. He was ranked 12th by his fellow players on the NFL Top 100 Players of 2016.

==== 2016 season ====
On August 5, 2016, Palmer signed a one-year, $24.35 million contract extension with the Cardinals. He started 15 games in 2016 and missed Week 5 against the San Francisco 49ers after suffering a concussion the previous week against the Los Angeles Rams. Palmer threw for over 4,000 yards for the sixth time in his career and finished the season with 4,233 yards, 26 touchdowns, and 14 interceptions. However, the Cardinals missed the playoffs with a 7–8–1 record.

==== 2017 season ====
On September 17, 2017, in Week 2, Palmer passed for 332 yards, one touchdown, and one interception in the 16–13 overtime victory over the Indianapolis Colts. During Week 7 against the Los Angeles Rams at Twickenham Stadium, Palmer had 122 passing yards and an interception until leaving the game with a left arm injury. The Cardinals were shut out 33–0. Not long after, Palmer was diagnosed with a broken left arm, and was ruled out for at least eight weeks. He was placed on injured reserve on October 26, 2017. On November 22, the Cardinals announced that Palmer was to remain out for the rest of 2017. However, on December 1, Palmer said he felt "pretty good" about returning.

=== Retirement ===
On January 2, 2018, Palmer announced his retirement from the NFL. At the time of his retirement, he was 12th all-time in both passing yards and passing touchdowns with 46,247 and 294, respectively. Palmer was inducted into the Arizona Cardinals Ring of Honor on September 29, 2019, its 18th inductee.

== Career statistics ==
Legend
	Led the league
**Bold**	Career high

=== NFL ===
==== Regular season ====
Year	Team	Games			Passing								Rushing				Sacked		Fumbles	
Year	Team	GP	GS	Record	Cmp	Att	Pct	Yds	Avg	TD	Int	Rtg	Att	Yds	Avg	TD	Sck	SckY	Fum	Lost
2003	CIN	0	0	DNP																
2004	CIN	13	13	6–7	263	432	60.8	2,897	6.7	18	18	77.3	18	47	2.6	1	25	178	2	2
2005	CIN	16	16	11–5	345	509	**67.8**	3,836	7.5	32	12	101.1	34	41	1.2	1	19	105	5	2
2006	CIN	16	16	8–8	324	520	62.3	4,035	7.8	28	13	93.9	26	37	1.4	0	36	233	**15**	**7**
2007	CIN	16	16	7–9	**373**	575	64.9	4,131	7.2	26	20	86.7	24	10	0.4	0	17	119	5	1
2008	CIN	4	4	0–4	75	129	58.1	731	5.7	3	4	69.0	6	38	**6.3**	0	11	67	2	0
2009	CIN	16	16	10–6	282	466	60.5	3,094	6.6	21	13	83.6	**39**	**93**	2.4	**3**	26	213	6	2
2010	CIN	16	16	4–12	362	586	61.8	3,971	6.8	26	20	82.4	32	50	1.6	0	26	201	7	3
2011	OAK	10	9	4–5	199	328	60.7	2,753	8.4	13	16	80.5	16	20	1.3	1	17	119	2	1
2012	OAK	15	15	4–11	345	565	61.1	4,018	7.1	22	14	85.3	18	36	2.0	1	26	199	7	5
2013	ARI	16	16	10–6	362	572	63.3	4,274	7.5	24	**22**	83.9	27	3	0.1	0	**41**	**289**	6	3
2014	ARI	6	6	6–0	141	224	62.9	1,626	7.3	11	3	95.6	8	25	3.1	0	9	59	3	1
2015	ARI	16	16	**13–3**	342	537	63.7	**4,671**	**8.7**	**35**	11	**104.6**	25	24	1.0	1	25	151	6	2
2016	ARI	15	15	6–8–1	364	**597**	61.0	4,233	7.1	26	14	87.2	14	38	2.7	0	40	281	14	4
2017	ARI	7	7	3–4	164	267	61.4	1,978	7.4	9	7	84.4	14	12	0.9	0	22	150	2	0
Career		182	181	92–88–1	3,941	6,347	62.5	46,247	7.3	294	187	87.9	301	474	1.6	8	340	2,364	82	33

==== Postseason ====
Year	Team	Games			Passing								Rushing				Sacked		Fumbles	
Year	Team	GP	GS	Record	Cmp	Att	Pct	Yds	Avg	TD	Int	Rtg	Att	Yds	Avg	TD	Sck	SckY	Fum	Lost
2005	CIN	1	1	0–1	1	1	**100.0**	66	**66.0**	0	0	**118.8**	0	0	0	0	0	0	0	0
2009	CIN	1	1	0–1	18	36	50.0	146	4.1	1	1	58.3	**1**	**2**	**2.0**	0	3	**36**	1	0
2014	ARI	0	0	Did not play due to injury																
2015	ARI	2	2	**1–1**	**48**	**81**	59.3	**548**	7.2	**4**	**6**	67.1	0	0	0.0	0	**6**	29	**3**	**2**
Career		4	4	1–3	67	118	56.8	760	6.7	5	7	66.9	1	2	2.0	0	9	65	4	2

=== College ===
Season	Team	Games		Passing								Rushing			
Season	Team	GP	Record	Comp	Att	Pct	Yards	Avg	TD	Int	Rate	Att	Yards	Avg	TD
1998	USC	13	4–1	130	235	55.3	1,755	7.5	7	6	122.8	47	−116	−2.5	1
1999	USC	3	2–1	39	53	**73.6**	490	**9.2**	3	**3**	**158.6**	7	2	0.3	1
2000	USC	12	5–7	228	415	54.9	2,914	7.0	16	18	118.0	63	5	0.1	2
2001	USC	12	6–6	221	377	58.6	2,717	7.2	13	12	124.2	**88**	**34**	**0.4**	1
2002	USC	13	**11–2**	**309**	**489**	63.2	**3,942**	8.1	**33**	10	149.1	50	−122	−2.4	**4**
Career		53	28–17	927	1,569	59.1	11,818	7.5	72	49	131.2	255	-197	-0.8	9

== Career highlights ==
=== Awards and honors ===
NFL

- 3× Pro Bowl selection (2005, 2006, 2015)
- Second-team All-Pro selection (2015) (Pro Football Focus and Associated Press)
- Pro Bowl MVP (2006)
- NFL Alumni Quarterback of the Year (2005)
- 2× FedEx Air Player of the Year (2005, 2015)
- AFC Player of the Year (2005)
- NFL passing touchdowns leader (2005)
- NFC passing touchdowns co-leader (2015)
- NFL completion percentage leader (2005)
- AFC pass completions leader (2005)
- NFL total quarterback rating leader (2015)
- SN Comeback Player of the Year (2015)
- Ed Block Courage Award (2006)
- Ranked No. 12 in the Top 100 Players of 2016
- AFC Offensive Player of the Month (September 2005)
- 2× AFC Offensive Player of the Week (Week 13, 2004; Week 7, 2009)
- NFC Offensive Player of the Week (Week 12, 2013)
- Pro Football Weekly NFL Offensive Player of the Week (Week 7, 2009)

College

- Heisman Trophy (2002)
- Johnny Unitas Golden Arm Award (2002)
- Pop Warner Trophy (2002)
- SN Player of the Year (2002)
- Consensus All-American (2002)
- Pac-10 Co-Offensive Player of the Year (2002)
- First-team All-Pac-10 (2002)
- USC Trojans No. 3 retired
- USC Trojans Athletics Hall of Fame
- College Football Hall of Fame inductee (2021)

=== Records ===
==== NFL records ====
- First quarterback to throw for 4,000 yards in a season with 3 different teams (Cincinnati Bengals, Oakland Raiders, Arizona Cardinals)

==== Bengals franchise records ====
- First Bengals quarterback to pass for 4,000 yards in a season (twice; 2006–2007)
- Most touchdown passes, game: 6 (September 16, 2007, against the Cleveland Browns)
- Most touchdown passes, rookie game: 4 (tied with Greg Cook) (November 28, 2004, against the Cleveland Browns)
- Most consecutive games with a passer rating over 100: 9
- Most game winning drives, season: 5 (tied with Jeff Blake)

==== Cardinals franchise records ====
- Most passing yards in a single season: 4,671 (2015)
- Most passing touchdowns in a single season: 35 (2015)
- Highest passer rating in a single season: 104.6 (2015, in 16 starts)
- Most yards per pass attempt, career: 7.67
- Most yards per pass attempt, season: 8.7 (2015)
- Most passing yards per game, career: 279.3
- Most passing yards per game, season 291.9 (2015)
- Most consecutive seasons with 4,000 passing yards: 2 (2015–2016)
- Most seasons with 4,000+ passing yards: 3
- Most 400+ yard passing games, career: 3 (2013–2016)
- Most 300+ yard passing games, career: 25 (2013–2017)
- Most 300+ yard passing games, season: 9 (2015)

== Post-playing career ==
Following his retirement, Palmer became an advocate for cannabidiol. He partnered with CBD-based liniment maker Level Select in late 2019.

In 2024, Palmer returned to Santa Margarita as a volunteer coach for the freshman team, on which his son Fletch was the starting quarterback. At the end of the season, the school appointed him as head coach of the varsity team. On October 31, 2025, Santa Margarita won a share of the Trinity League title for the first time in school history. On November 28, 2025, they won the CIF Southern Section championship with a 42–7 blowout victory over Corona Centennial. On December 13, 2025, the school won a state championship with Palmer as the head coach. On October 30, 2026, Santa Margarita completed an undefeated regular season for the school's first ever sole Trinity League title.

== Personal life ==
On July 5, 2003, Palmer wed former USC soccer player, Shaelyn Fernandes, whom he met during freshman orientation. They currently reside in Sun Valley, Idaho. His brother, Jordan Palmer, was his best man at the wedding. Palmer and his wife have four children together: twins Fletch and Elle, Bries, and Carter.

Not counting endorsement deals Palmer earned over $174 million during his NFL career. In 2015, Forbes estimated that Palmer's annual income was $29 million. He and his wife pledged to make a challenge gift of $300,000 for Compassion International's "Fill the Stadium" initiative.

Following his first reconstructed knee surgery and learning that the tendon used for his knee came from a cadaver, Palmer had his wife drive him to the local Department of Motor Vehicles to have his driver's license updated to make him an organ donor as gratitude to the family who donated the tendon to him. Coincidentally, the teammate who caught his pass when he first injured his knee, Chris Henry, also donated several organs following his death in a 2009 auto accident.
