= A. J. Cruz =

American gridiron football player (born 1991)

A.J. Cruz
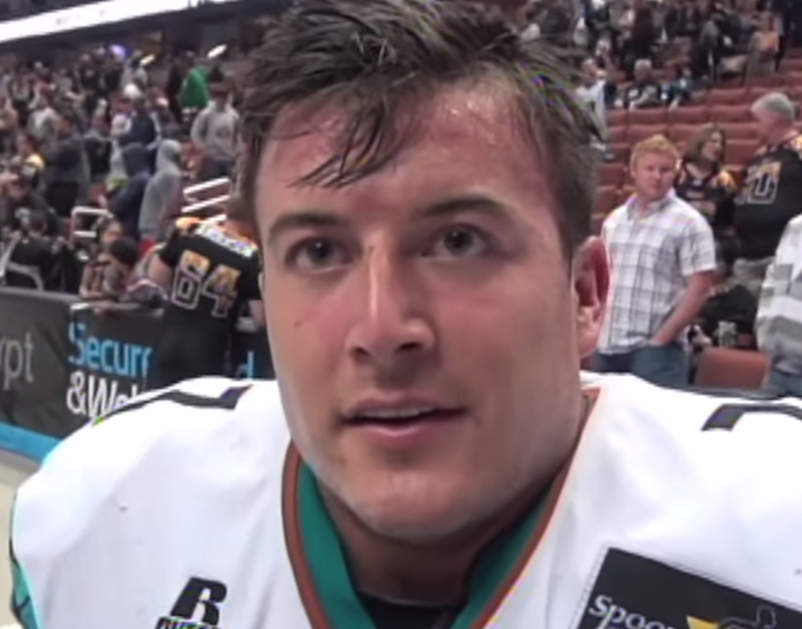
- Cruz with the Arizona Rattlers in 2015

Profile
- Position: Wide receiver

Personal information
- Born: February 20, 1991 (age 35); Lake Forest, California, U.S.
- Listed height: 5 ft 9 in (1.75 m)
- Listed weight: 195 lb (88 kg)

Career information
- High school: Rancho Santa Margarita (CA) Catholic
- College: Brown
- NFL draft: 2013: undrafted

Career history
- Los Angeles KISS (2014); Arizona Rattlers (2015); Chicago Bears (2015)*; Miami Dolphins (2016)*; Calgary Stampeders (2017)*; Edmonton Eskimos (2017)*
- * Offseason or practice squad member only

Career AFL statistics
- Receptions-Yds-TDs: 32-244-6
- Rushing-Yds-TDs: 11-46-3
- Tackles: 66
- Return yards: 2,584
- Return touchdowns: 7
- Stats at ArenaFan.com
- Stats at Pro Football Reference

A. J. Cruz (born February 20, 1991) is an American former professional football wide receiver. He played college football for Brown University.

== Early life ==
Cruz attended Santa Margarita Catholic High School, in Rancho Santa Margarita, California. He lettered in both football and basketball. As a football player, Cruz was named a two time All-Trinity League selection, and holds three school records for longest kick off return for a Touch Down (97 yards), highest kickoff return average (34 yards) and highest vertical jump (37 inches). Cruz helped lead his schools basketball team to a state championship, and was named to the California Scholarship Federation.

== College career ==
Cruz attended Brown University. As a freshman, Cruz earned Second-team All-Ivy Honors. As a sophomore, Cruz was selected for First-team All-Ivy Honors, while registering 2 interceptions and ranked second in both punt and kickoff returns.

In his senior season, Cruz earned First-team All-American honors. Cruz is one of 41 players in Ivy League history to earn First-team All-Ivy three times.

== Professional career ==
=== Los Angeles KISS ===
Cruz joined the Los Angeles KISS in 2014. He returned 58 kickoffs for 1,305 yards in 11 games his rookie season. He was placed on recallable reassignment on March 13, 2015.

=== Arizona Rattlers ===
In the middle of the 2015 season, Cruz signed with the Arizona Rattlers.

=== Chicago Bears ===
On July 27, 2015, the Bears signed Cruz to a three-year deal. On September 5, 2015, he was waived/injured by the Bears.

=== Miami Dolphins ===
On February 18, 2016, the Dolphins signed Cruz to a deal. On August 27, 2016, he was waived by the Dolphins.

=== Calgary Stampeders ===
Cruz signed with the Calgary Stampeders on May 17, 2017. He was released on June 17, 2017.

=== Edmonton Eskimos ===
Cruz was signed to the practice roster of the Edmonton Eskimos on October 26, 2017. He was released on May 1, 2018.
