= Nick Meyer (baseball) =

American baseball player (born 1997)

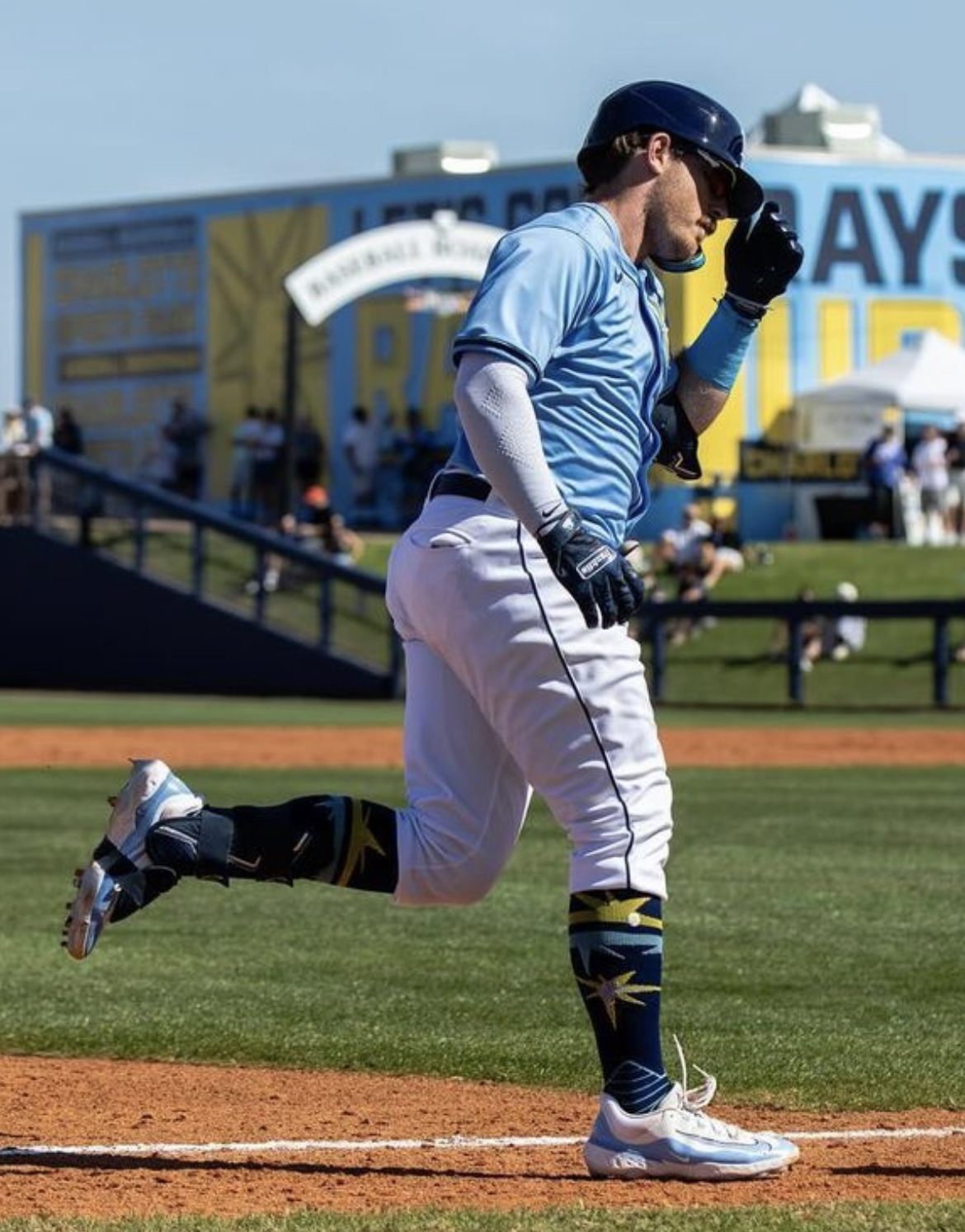
- Meyer in spring training with the Tampa Bay Rays

Biographical details
- Born: February 18, 1997 (age 29); Westminster, Colorado, U.S.

Playing career
- 2016–2018: Cal Poly
- 2018: Brooklyn Cyclones
- 2019: Gulf Coast League Mets
- 2019: St. Lucie Mets
- 2020: Tully Monsters
- 2021–2022: Binghamton Rumble Ponies
- 2021–2023: Syracuse Mets
- Position: Catcher

Coaching career (HC unless noted)
- 2025: Cal Poly (asst.)

Nicholas Joseph Meyer (born February 18, 1997) is an American former professional baseball catcher and coach. He played college baseball for the Cal Poly Mustangs, then played professionally for the New York Mets and Tampa Bay Rays organizations. He was a Cal Poly coach in 2025.

== Early life ==
Meyer was born in Westminster, Colorado on February 18, 1997. Meyer was born with a condition called pre-axial polydactyly and was born with two left thumbs. He underwent surgery to have the extra thumb removed when he was two years old. This would cause Meyer to lose flexibility in his knuckle, and to this day, he cannot fully bend his left thumb .

Meyer attended Santa Margarita Catholic High School, where he played football and baseball. Ironically, Meyer didn't begin catching until his junior year, while his brother Joshua played catcher on the varsity team ahead of him. However, once he took over, he was a natural.

Meyer considered joining his brother Joshua at Grand Canyon University but ultimately decided to attend California Polytechnic State University, San Luis Obisbo.

== College career ==
=== Freshman year ===
Meyer was in the starting lineup as a true freshman on Opening Day 2016 for Cal Poly. He would play 51 games his freshman year, hitting .301/.374/.370 with 21 RBIs. He would also have an impressive 41.5% CS on the defensive side of the ball. For his efforts, Meyer was named the Big West Conference Freshman Field Player of the Year.

=== Sophomore year ===
Though he hit only .255/.316/.330, Meyer played in all but one of Cal Poly's 56 games as a sophomore with 49 starts behind the plate. Despite this, Meyer would continue to be a force defensively, with a .985 FLD%, and a 40.9% CS. Meyer would win his second consecutive John Orton Golden Glove award.

For the summer, Meyer was selected to be a member of the U.S. collegiate national team. In these games, Meyer had an OBP of .350. Additionally, he threw out three of five base stealers while playing in 15 of the U.S.'s 20 games.

=== Junior year ===
In his final college season, Meyer had his best season yet, hitting .337/.394/.411 in 51 games. During the season, Meyer made a name for himself as a tremendous contact hitter, as he struck out just 19 times in 215 at bats. He continued to be a standout defensively as well, being named the Big West Conference Defensive Player of the Year.

== Professional career ==
=== New York Mets ===
Before the draft, Meyer was considered a Day 2 selection in the 2018 MLB draft. Meyer was taken with the 170th pick in the 2018 draft by the New York Mets. To entice him to forgo his collegiate senior season, the Mets offered Meyer a $350,000 signing bonus, roughly $65,000 over the MLB-assigned slot value of the pick he was selected at.

Meyer played the rest of the summer with the Low-A Brooklyn Cyclones in Coney Island and hit .226/.275/.270 with nine RBI and two stolen bases in 43 games.

In 2019, Meyer played 68 games with the High-A St. Lucie Mets and rookie-level Gulf Coast League Mets. He hit .182/.250/.225 with one home run, 12 RBI, and 12 stolen bases. Defensively however, he would continue to shine, throwing out 33 of 42 base stealers for a CS% of 44%.

In 2020, the minor league season was cancelled due to the COVID-19 pandemic. Meyer played professional baseball that summer, playing for the Tully Monsters in the City of Champions Cup, a four-team pop-up league in Illinois. He hit .247/.357/.360 with two home runs, 13 RBI, and 21 stolen bases in 27 games with the team.

Meyer began the 2021 season in Double-A, with the Binghamton Rumble Ponies. He had a hot start to the season, hitting .375/.432/.375. The team would take notice and call him up to their Triple-A affiliate, the Syracuse Mets. Meyer would continue his hot streak with Syracuse and hit .282/.349/.333. The team sent Meyer back and forth between Double-A and Triple-A throughout the season, and he finished 2021 hitting .251/.337/.324 with three home runs, 18 RBI, and six stolen bases in 62 games with both teams.

In 2022, Meyer once again split time in Binghamton and Syracuse. He appeared in 72 games between the two affiliates. He hit a combined .267/.360/.359 with Syracuse in his first two seasons with the team. In 2023, with the Mets holding an abundance of catchers on their roster, Dick Scott tried Meyer out at several positions during the season, including third base, first base, left field, right field, second base, as well as catcher. Meyer continued to shine defensively at each of these positions.

In addition to his efforts on the field, Meyer was a clear fan-favorite. At the conclusion of the 2023 season, Meyer was voted Syracuse's most popular player by local fans. The fans were drawn to his notorious mustache and his relentless work ethic after spending several years with the Triple-A team. In 71 appearances for Syracuse in 2023, Meyer slashed .217/.309/.309 with six home runs, 26 RBI, and six stolen bases. Meyer was released by the Mets organization on November 1.

=== Tampa Bay Rays ===
On January 29, 2024, Meyer signed a minor league contract with the Tampa Bay Rays that included an invitation to spring training. The Rays organization released him prior to the start of the season on March 27.

== Coaching career ==
Meyer returned to Cal Poly San Luis Obisbo and joined the team as a student assistant coach for the 2025 season. In 2026, he returned to Santa Margarita Catholic High School as a member of the coaching staff.
