= Cardinals–Seahawks rivalry =

National Football League rivalry

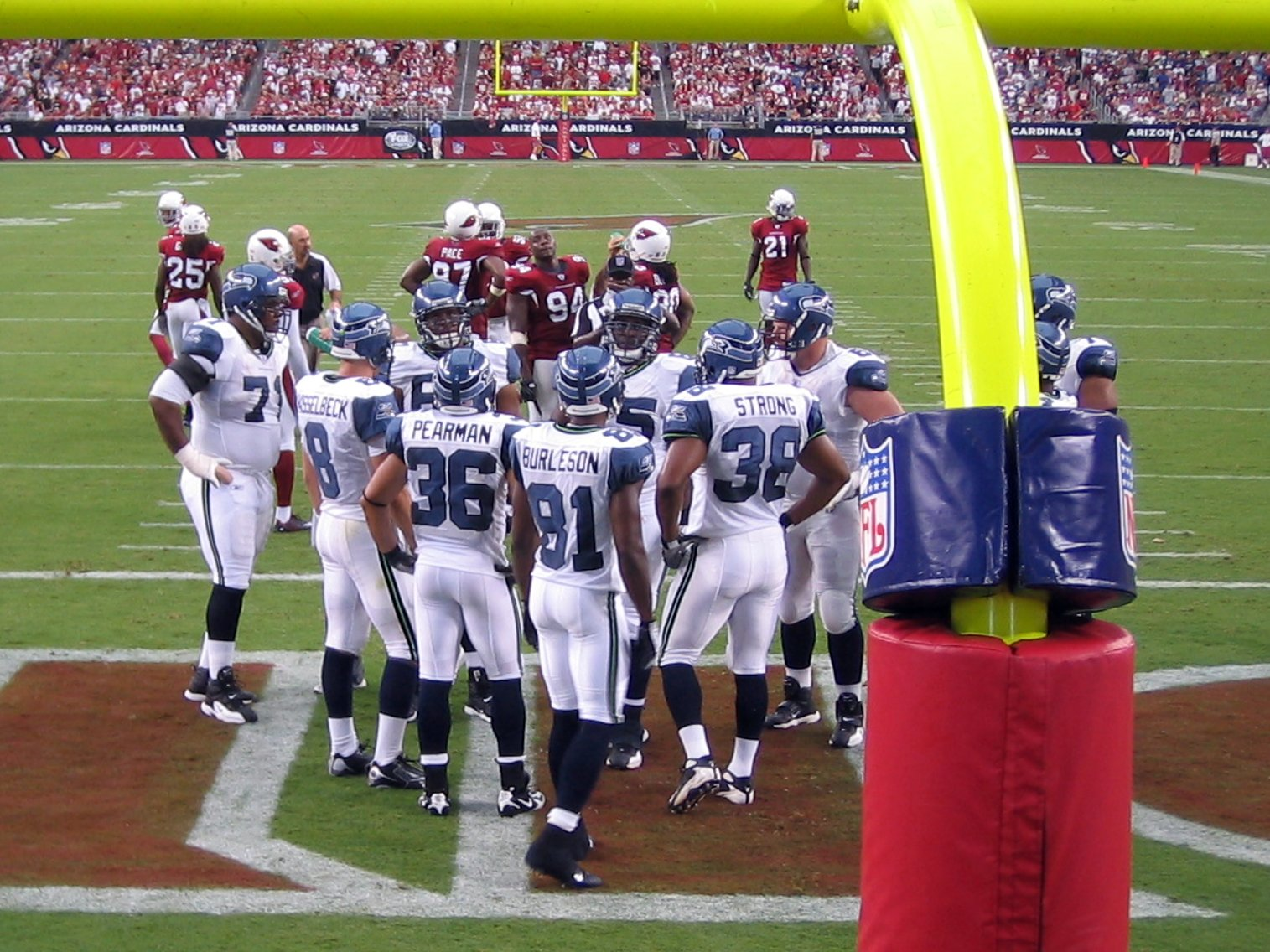
- Cardinals and Seahawks face off during the 2007 season.

- Arizona Cardinals Seattle Seahawks
- Location: Phoenix, Seattle
- First meeting: September 12, 1976; Cardinals 30, Seahawks 24
- Latest meeting: November 8, 2026; Seahawks 17, Cardinals 3
- Next meeting: 2027
- Stadiums: Cardinals: State Farm Stadium; Seahawks: Lumen Field

Statistics
- Total meetings: 56
- All-time series: Seahawks: 33–22–1
- Largest victory: Cardinals: 27–3 (2009); Seahawks: 58–0 (2012)
- Most points scored: Cardinals: 39 (2015); Seahawks: 58 (2012)
- Longest win streak: Cardinals: 5 (1976–1995); Seahawks: 11 (2021–present)
- Current win streak: Seahawks: 11 (2021–present)

The Cardinals–Seahawks rivalry is a National Football League (NFL) rivalry between the Arizona Cardinals and Seattle Seahawks.

This is one of the newer rivalries in the NFL, emerging in the early 2000s, as the two teams only became rivals after both were relocated to the NFC West as a result of the league's realignment in 2002. This rivalry has become one of the NFL's more bitter in recent years, as the mid-to-late 2010s often saw the Seahawks and Cardinals squaring off for NFC West supremacy.

The Seahawks lead the overall series, 33–22–1. The two teams have not met in the playoffs.

== History ==
=== Early years ===
The Seahawks came into the league in 1976 as an expansion team and play the Cardinals six times as an inter-conference opponent. As a St. Louis-based team, the Cardinals won both meetings between the two franchises, and as an Arizona-based franchise, the Cardinals went 3–1 against the Seahawks. The Cardinals won the first five games of the series until the Seahawks beat the Cardinals 33–14 at the Kingdome in 1998.

=== 2000s: Move to NFC West ===
The rivalry between the Cardinals and Seahawks became a full-fledged one in 2002, when the two teams were placed in the NFC West as part of the NFL realignment. The teams split their 2000s meetings, going 8–8 against each other. Both teams swept the other en route to Super Bowl appearances, with the Seahawks sweeping the Cardinals in 2005 en route to a Super Bowl XL berth and the Cardinals returning the favor in 2008 en route to an appearance in Super Bowl XLIII.

=== 2010s: Fight for NFC West supremacy ===
In 2010, the Seahawks hired Pete Carroll as head coach. Carroll won his first three meetings against the Cardinals as Seahawks coach, before the Cardinals beat the Seahawks 23–20 in overtime in the final week of the 2011 season.

In 2012, the Seahawks drafted Russell Wilson in the third round of the 2012 NFL draft. After winning the starting job, Wilson's first game with the Seahawks was against the Cardinals in Arizona. With a last-second goal-line stand, the Cardinals won 20–16, which would be their last home win over the Seahawks until 2020. The Seahawks, however, exacted revenge with a 58–0 home win in Week 14. The Seahawks defense, which had become known as the Legion of Boom by this point, intercepted Cardinals quarterback John Skelton four times and scored two defensive touchdowns, while running back Marshawn Lynch scored three rushing touchdowns in the victory.

The next year, the Cardinals hired Bruce Arians as head coach and traded for quarterback Carson Palmer. Although Palmer lost his first game against the Seahawks at home in Week 7, he would overcome four interceptions to lead a last-second touchdown drive that would win the Week 16 rematch 17–10. Both teams finished with double-digit wins, but while the 13–3 Seahawks won the division (and went on to win Super Bowl XLVIII), the 10–6 Cardinals missed the playoffs.

In 2014, the Cardinals jumped out to a 9–1 start while the Seahawks began the season 6–3. However, Palmer suffered a torn ACL in Week 10 and missed both meetings against the Seahawks that season, which led to the Seahawks accumulating their first sweep of the Cardinals since 2010. This included a 35–6 Sunday Night Football road win in Week 16 that clinched the division for the Seahawks for the second-straight season. The Seahawks went on to Super Bowl XLIX, which was coincidentally held in the Cardinals home stadium, but lost to the Patriots in their quest to repeat as Super Bowl champions. The Cardinals, meanwhile, qualified for the playoffs with an 11–5 record as a Wild Card, but lost to the Carolina Panthers.

The following year, the Cardinals won the NFC West for the first time since 2009 with a 13–3 record. The Seahawks, meanwhile, suffered a Super Bowl hangover with a 10–6 record. The two teams split their meetings, with the Cardinals winning the Week 10 meeting in Seattle 39–32, and the Seahawks blowing out the Cardinals 36–6 in the season finale in Arizona. Both teams once again made the playoffs, and both would go on to lose to eventual NFC champion Carolina, with the Seahawks falling in the Divisional Round and the Cardinals in the NFC Championship Game. This is the last time both teams made the playoffs in the same season to date.

The Cardinals and Seahawks played to a 6–6 tie in their Week 7 Sunday Night meeting in Arizona, which was also the first tie on Sunday Night Football. Cardinals kicker Chandler Catanzaro and his Seattle counterpart, Stephen Hauschka, each missed field goals that would have won the game for either team. Catanzaro, however, kicked the game-winning field goal during the meeting in Seattle that gave the Cardinals a 34–31 victory. Seattle won the NFC West with a 10–5–1 record, while the Cardinals missed the playoffs with a 7–8–1 record, their first losing season since 2012.

Both teams missed the playoffs in 2017, and the Cardinals would win in Seattle during the season finale after kicker Blair Walsh missed the game-winning field goal. Earlier that day, the Atlanta Falcons had won their game against the Carolina Panthers, so even if Walsh had made the go-ahead kick, the Seahawks still would have missed the playoffs. Both Arians and Palmer retired after the season, with Palmer missing both meetings against Seattle again, this time due to a broken arm sustained in Week 7. When starting with the Cardinals, Palmer would ultimately go undefeated in Seattle with a 3–0 record with the team at CenturyLink Field, and Arians would have a 4–1 record at the stadium as Arizona's coach. The Seahawks would go 10–6 in 2018 and sweep the Cardinals, who finished with a league-worst 3–13 record to clinch the first overall pick in the following draft.

The Cardinals drafted quarterback Kyler Murray in 2019 with the first overall pick. His first meeting against Wilson was a 27–10 home loss in Week 4 that was highlighted by newly-acquired Seahawks defensive end Jadeveon Clowney intercepting a Murray screen pass that he returned 27 yards for the game's first touchdown. The Cardinals, however, beat the Seahawks in the Week 16 rematch behind 166 rushing yards and three scores from running back Kenyan Drake.

=== 2020s ===
In 2020, the 5–0 Seahawks traveled to Arizona to meet the 4–2 Cardinals for a Week 7 game that got flexed into the Sunday Night Football time slot due to COVID-19 concerns regarding the original matchup (Tampa Bay vs. Las Vegas). In a back-and-forth game that went into overtime, Murray and Wilson combined for 77 completions, 748 yards, and six touchdowns through the air. However, Wilson threw three costly interceptions, including one to Cardinals rookie linebacker Isaiah Simmons in overtime that set up Cardinals kicker Zane Gonzalez's game-winning field goal on the game's final play, resulting in the Cardinals handing the Seahawks their first loss of the season as well as beating the Seahawks at home for the first time since 2012. One of the highlights of the game was Seahawks wide receiver DK Metcalf chasing down Cardinals safety Budda Baker following Baker intercepting Wilson. Metcalf tracked Baker down inside the 10-yard line following a 90-yard return, and his track down proved to be important as the Cardinals could not score in the four go-to-goal plays following Baker getting taken down. Four weeks later, the two teams, now sporting identical 6–3 records, met for a Thursday Night Football rematch in Seattle, which Seattle won after a fourth-down sack of Murray by Seahawks defensive end Carlos Dunlap late in the game. After the game in Seattle, the teams went in opposite directions going forward. The Cardinals proceeded to finish the season 8–8, winning only two of their final six games, and were eliminated from playoff contention altogether. Seattle, on the other hand, used the victory as a springboard to a 4–1 season finish, winning the NFC West with a 12–4 record.

The following season, the Cardinals and Seahawks met in Arizona during the final week of the season in a game that had significant playoff implications for the Cardinals. While the Seahawks had been eliminated from playoff contention and clinched their first losing season since 2011 two weeks prior, the Cardinals needed a win to clinch the division title, while a loss would lead to the Rams clinching the division. The Seahawks spoiled the Cardinals' chances of a division title with a 38–30 victory, with running back Rashaad Penny sealing the win with a 62-yard touchdown run.

Following the 2021 season, the Seahawks traded Wilson to the Denver Broncos. Wilson ended up compiling an 11–8–1 record against the Cardinals, including a 7–2–1 record in Arizona. Coincidentally, Wilson's first and last games as the Seahawks QB, as well as his first and last touchdown passes as a Seahawk, came against the Cardinals in Arizona.

== Season-by-season results ==
St. Louis/Phoenix/Arizona Cardinals vs. Seattle Seahawks Season-by-Season Results
1970s – 1990s (Cardinals, 5–1)

Season	Results	Location	Overall series	Notes
1976	Cardinals; 30–24	Kingdome	Cardinals; 1–0	Seahawks join the National Football League (NFL) as an expansion team and are placed in the National Football Conference (NFC) and the NFC West. In the following season, the Seahawks and Tampa Bay Buccaneers switched places, with the Seahawks moving to the American Football Conference (AFC) and the AFC West, where they would remain until the 2002 season. Game was Seahawks' inaugural franchise game.
1983	Cardinals; 33–28	Busch Stadium	Cardinals; 2–0	First and only meeting in St. Louis and at Busch Memorial Stadium.
1989	Cardinals; 34–24	Kingdome	Cardinals; 3–0	Cardinals relocate to Phoenix, Arizona last season.
1993	Cardinals; 30–27 (OT)	Kingdome	Cardinals; 4–0	
1995	Cardinals; 20–14 (OT)	Sun Devil Stadium	Cardinals; 5–0	First meeting in Phoenix, Arizona, and at Sun Devil Stadium. Cardinals rename themselves to "Arizona Cardinals" last season.
1998	Seahawks; 33–14	Kingdome	Cardinals; 5–1	Final meeting at Kingdome.

2000s (Tie 8–8)

Season	Season series	at Arizona Cardinals	at Seattle Seahawks	Overall series	Notes
2002	Tie 1–1	Seahawks; 27–6	Cardinals; 24–13	Cardinals; 6–2	During the NFL realignment, Cardinals and Seahawks are placed in the NFC West, resulting in two meetings annually. Seahawks open Seahawks Stadium (now known as Lumen Field). Seahawks record their first road win against the Cardinals.
2003	Seahawks 2–0	Seahawks; 38–0	Seahawks; 28–10	Cardinals; 6–4	
2004	Tie 1–1	Cardinals; 25–17	Seahawks; 24–21	Cardinals; 7–5	
2005	Seahawks 2–0	Seahawks; 33–19	Seahawks; 37–12	Tie; 7–7	Last meeting at Sun Devil Stadium (now known as Mountain America Stadium). Seahawks sweep the NFC West for the first time in franchise history. Seahawks lose Super Bowl XL.
2006	Tie 1–1	Cardinals; 27–21	Seahawks; 21–10	Tie; 8–8	Cardinals open University of Phoenix Stadium (now known as State Farm Stadium).
2007	Tie 1–1	Cardinals; 23–20	Seahawks; 42–21	Tie; 9–9	
2008	Cardinals 2–0	Cardinals; 34–21	Cardinals; 26–20	Cardinals; 11–9	Cardinals sweep the NFC West for the first time in franchise history. Cardinals lose Super Bowl XLIII.
2009	Cardinals 2–0	Cardinals; 31–20	Cardinals; 27–3	Cardinals; 13–9	In Seattle, Cardinals record their largest victory over the Seahawks with a 24–point differential. As of November 9, 2026, this remains the most recent season the Cardinals swept the season series against the Seahawks.

2010s (Seahawks, 12–7–1)

Season	Season series	at Arizona Cardinals	at Seattle Seahawks	Overall series	Notes
2010	Seahawks 2–0	Seahawks; 36–18	Seahawks; 22–10	Cardinals; 13–11	
2011	Tie 1–1	Cardinals; 23–20 (OT)	Seahawks; 13–10	Cardinals; 14–12	
2012	Tie 1–1	Cardinals; 20–16	Seahawks; 58–0	Cardinals; 15–13	Seahawks draft QB Russell Wilson, who makes his NFL debut in Arizona. In Seattle, Seahawks eliminate the Cardinals from playoff contention and set franchise records for their largest victory overall with a 58–point differential and their most points scored in a game. Meanwhile, the Cardinals set franchise records for their worst loss overall and their most points allowed in a game.
2013	Tie 1–1	Seahawks; 34–22	Cardinals; 17–10	Cardinals; 16–14	First meeting between Carson Palmer and Wilson. Cardinals' win was the Seahawks only home loss in their 2013 season. Seahawks win Super Bowl XLVIII.
2014	Seahawks 2–0	Seahawks; 35–6	Seahawks; 19–3	Tie; 16–16	In Arizona, Seahawks finished with 596 total yards, setting a franchise record for most yards in a game, and clinched the NFC West with their win. Seahawks lose Super Bowl XLIX.
2015	Tie 1–1	Seahawks; 36–6	Cardinals; 39–32	Tie; 17–17	In Seattle, Cardinals score their most points in a game against the Seahawks.
2016	Cardinals 1–0–1	Tie; 6–6 (OT)	Cardinals; 34–31	Cardinals; 18–17–1	In Arizona, Seahawks' K Stephen Hauschka and Cardinals' K Chandler Catanzaro missed short field goals that would have won the game in overtime.
2017	Tie 1–1	Seahawks; 22–16	Cardinals; 26–24	Cardinals; 19–18–1	The Cardinals win in Seattle was Bruce Arians final game for Arizona.
2018	Seahawks 2–0	Seahawks; 20–17	Seahawks; 27–24	Seahawks; 20–19–1	Both games were decided by game-winning Seahawks' field goals. Seahawks take the lead in the season series for the first time.
2019	Tie 1–1	Seahawks; 27–10	Cardinals; 27–13	Seahawks; 21–20–1	

2020s (Seahawks, 12–2)

Season	Season series	at Arizona Cardinals	at Seattle Seahawks	Overall series	Notes
2020	Tie 1–1	Cardinals; 37–34 (OT)	Seahawks; 28–21	Seahawks; 22–21–1	
2021	Tie 1–1	Seahawks; 38–30	Cardinals; 23–13	Seahawks; 23–22–1	Game in Arizona was Russell Wilson's final game as a Seahawk. Seahawks' win prevents the Cardinals from clinching the NFC West.
2022	Seahawks 2–0	Seahawks; 31–21	Seahawks; 19–9	Seahawks; 25–22–1	
2023	Seahawks 2–0	Seahawks; 21–20	Seahawks; 20–10	Seahawks; 27–22–1	Game in Arizona was Pete Carroll's final game as head coach of the Seahawks.
2024	Seahawks 2–0	Seahawks; 30–18	Seahawks; 16–6	Seahawks; 29–22–1	
2025	Seahawks 2–0	Seahawks; 23–20	Seahawks; 44–22	Seahawks; 31–22–1	Seahawks win Super Bowl LX.
2026	Seahawks 2–0	Seahawks; 31–7	Seahawks; 17–3	Seahawks; 33–22–1	Seahawks win 11 straight meetings (2021–present).

Summary of Results

Season	Season series	at St. Louis/Phoenix/Arizona Cardinals	at Seattle Seahawks	Notes
Regular season	Seahawks 33–22–1	Seahawks 16–10–1	Seahawks 17–12	Cardinals are 1–0 in St. Louis (1983).

== See also ==
- List of NFL rivalries
- NFC West
