= Frank McCrehan =

American baseball player and coach

Biographical details
- Died: March 10, 1960 (aged 57); Cambridge, Massachusetts, U.S.
- Education: Boston College

Playing career
- 1922–1925: Boston College
- 1925: Jersey City Skeeters
- 1926: Haverhill Hillies
- Position: Pitcher

Coaching career (HC unless noted)
- 1926–1927: Boston College (Pitching)
- 1928–1930: Boston College (Freshmen)
- 1931–1938: Boston College

Francis J. McCrehan (unknown – March 10, 1960) was an American baseball player and coach at Boston College.

== Early life ==
McCrehan was born in Cambridge, Massachusetts. His father, Jack McCrehan, was a Cambridge police officer. One of his brothers, Jeremiah “Jud” McCrehan was a minor league baseball player.

== Playing career ==
=== Cambridge High and Latin School ===
McCrehan, nicknamed Cheese, played high school baseball at Cambridge High and Latin School. He was the starting pitcher for the 1921 CHLS team that won 27 straight games and won the Suburban League championship. His teammates included Doc Gautreau and Sonny Foley.

=== Boston College ===
McCrehan pitched for the Boston College Eagles baseball team from 1922 to 1925. On June 18, 1923, McCrehan led BC to a 4–1 victory over Ownie Carroll and the Holy Cross Crusaders in front of 30,000 fans at Braves Field. It was one of only two games Carroll lost in his collegiate career (the other was to Charlie Caldwell and Princeton the same year).

=== Minor league and semi-pro baseball ===
In 1925, McCrehan signed with the Jersey City Skeeters of the International League. In 1926 he pitched for the Haverhill Hillies of the New England League. In 23 games he had a 7–4 record and an ERA of 4.25. He had a tryout with the Cincinnati Reds but was not offered a contract.

McCrehan was also the player-coach of the North Cambridge Knights of Columbus baseball team and spent five seasons as a member of North Cambridge's team in the Twilight League, where he played with former high school teammates Gautreau and Foley as well as Bill Cleary. The Twilight League club was considered to be one of the best in the state and drew over 30,000 to Russell Field on multiple occasions.

== Coaching ==
In 1926, McCrehan joined Jack Slattery's coaching staff at Boston College as pitching coach. In 1928 he was made the freshman coach. In 1931 he was promoted to head coach of the varsity team. He resigned before the 1939 season due to pressures from his work for the Commonwealth of Massachusetts.

== Government service ==
In 1937, McCrehan was appointed by Governor Charles F. Hurley to manage the Boston central office of the State Unemployment Commission. He later worked as a supervisor for the State Department of Education and with Massachusetts' Civil Defense agency. During World War II he was a physical education instructor in the United States Navy. In 1949 he was elected to the Cambridge school committee. He remained on the board until his defeat in 1955.

== Personal life and death ==
McCrehan resided at 146 Rindge Avenue before moving in with his cousin, Mary Louise Riley. He died on March 10, 1960, at the age of 57.
