= Kidder–Sargent–McCrehan House =

Historic house in Massachusetts, United States

- U.S. National Register of Historic Places
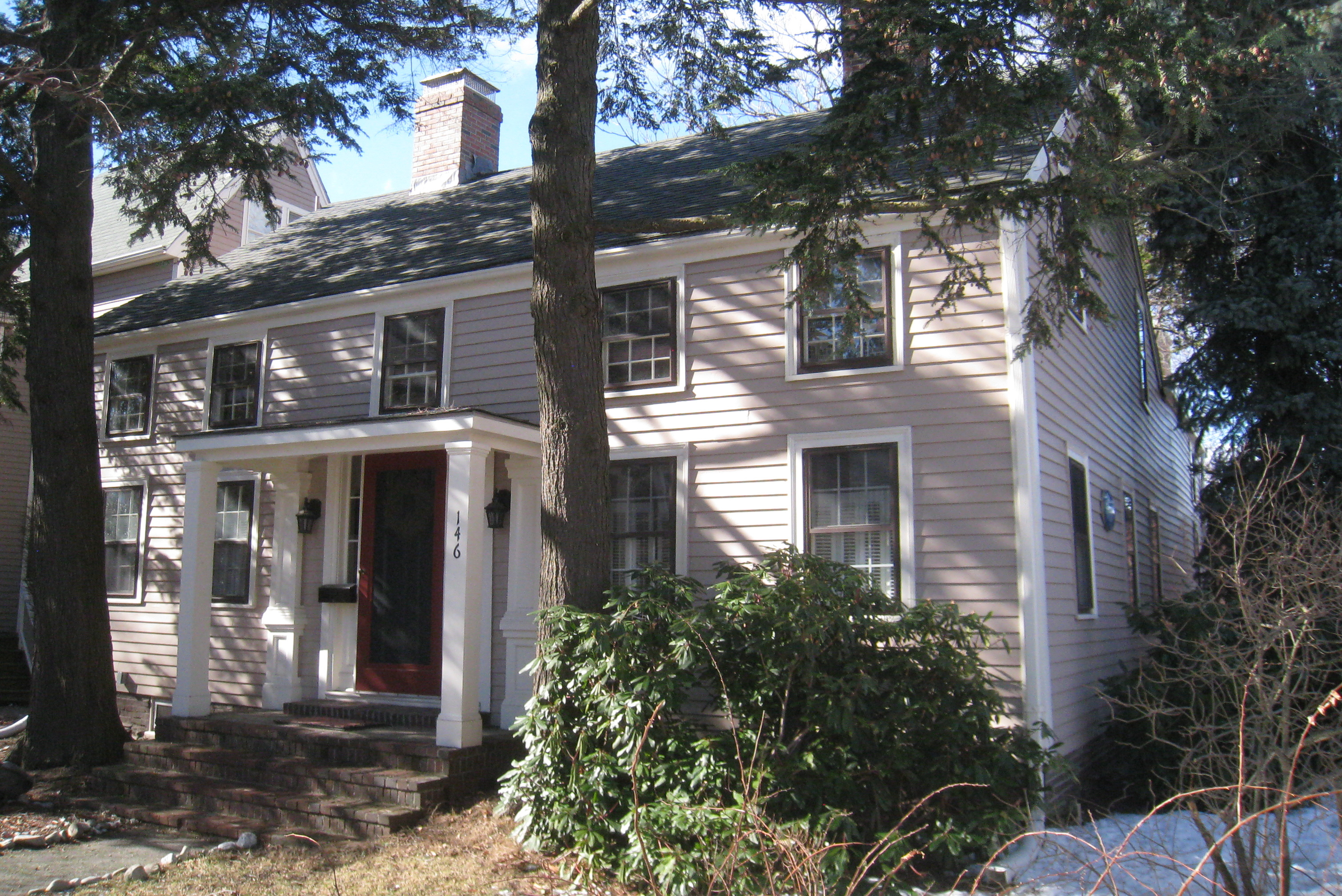

- Location within Massachusetts Location within the United States
- Location: 146 Rindge Avenue, Cambridge, Massachusetts
- Coordinates: 42°23′35.5″N 71°7′50.0″W
- Built: 1792
- Architectural style: Federal
- MPS: Cambridge MRA
- NRHP reference No.: 82001952
- Added to NRHP: April 13, 1982

The Kidder–Sargent–McCrehan House, also known as the Kidder–Sargent House, is an historic house in Cambridge, Massachusetts. The 2.5-story wood-frame house was built c. 1792 by Nathaniel Kidder, and is one of the oldest and least-altered buildings of the period in northwest Cambridge, and the only one on its original site. The house follows a typical Georgian center-chimney plan, with two rooms on either side of the chimney on each floor. The house was sold out of the Kidder family to Solomon Sargent in 1835, and was acquired by Jeremiah McCrehan in 1876.

The house was listed on the National Register of Historic Places in 1982.

== See also ==
- National Register of Historic Places listings in Cambridge, Massachusetts
