= Bernard J. Crehan =

Bernard J. Crehan, Irish priest and writer, was born on 2 July 1874.

Crehan was born in Rushestown, County Galway to John Crehan and Mary Farrell. He was ordained a Roman Catholic priest in 1900.

While stationed in County Sligo in the early 1900s, he became involved in the Irish cultural revival, and published works which sought to promote the Irish language.

He served at various times as President of the County Sligo Gaelic League, President of Grange Feis, and Hon. General Secretary to the Connaught Irish Colleges. He was a member of Sligo Feis Ceoil Committee, An Coisde Gnotha, the Irish Texts Society.

== See also ==
- Maol Eoin Ó Crechain, died 1243.

== Select bibliography ==
- Comhradh le haghaidh mac-Cughinn, 1903
- Leabhar urnaighte Naomh Padraic, 1905
- Mion-Chaint. Gill's Irish phrase book, n.d.
