= Fiona Crean =

First ombudsman of Toronto, Ontario

City of Toronto Ombudsman
- In office November 2008 – November 2015
- Preceded by: Position established

Fiona Crean is the first ombudsman of Toronto, Ontario. She was appointed to the position in 2008 and announced she would not be seeking to renew her contract in 2015. In October 2015, it was announced she would be appointed as the first ombudsman of Hydro One.

== Career ==
Crean worked as an assistant deputy minister in Ontario's Ministry of Community Safety and Correctional Services.

=== Toronto ombudsman ===
In September 25, 2008, Crean was appointed as the City of Toronto's first ombudsman for a five-year period. In October 2012, her term was extended by two years. Throughout her term, she shared a sometimes difficult relationship with Toronto city councillors over her sometimes tough reports.

==== Staffing requests ====
Crean repeatedly requested additional staff for her office but was repeatedly denied. In 2011, Crean requested more staff for her office, but the city's budget committee declined the request. Crean said the decision would impact her ability to do the job and to remain independent. In 2014, Crean again requested additional staff, citing an increase of 60 percent in the number of complaints made to her office.

==== Toronto Community Housing ====
In April 2014, Crean released a report that was harshly critical of Toronto Community Housing chief executive Gene Jones for the hiring and firing practices at the agency. Toronto's then-mayor Rob Ford defended Jones, who he had hired in 2012. On April 25, 2014, Jones resigned from his position.

==== Rob Ford ====
Crean released a number of reports that were critical of Ford, starting in 2012. In September 2012, her office released a report complaining that Ford had interfered with the process for appointing citizens to city boards. On October 4, 2012, Crean appeared before Toronto City Council in regards to the report, where she was criticized by a number of councillors for perceived issues with the report. Despite the lengthy questioning, Crean's recommendations were approved 38-0.

After releasing a report criticizing Toronto Community Housing chief executive Gene Jones, Ford again called for Crean to resign, saying that the positions of ombudsman, integrity commissioner, and lobbyist registrar should be combined to save money. In April 2015, Crean released a report in which she harshly criticized the now city councillor Ford for his use, as mayor, of city staff as his personal staff, including using security guards to act as his bodyguards and to hide substance abuse issues. Ford released a statement in response complaining about the report.

==== End of term ====
In July 2014, it appeared that Toronto might consider hiring Crean for another five-year term. Some media members called for her to be rehired. However, Crean later announced she would not seek an extension on her term of office in March 2015, citing a wish to avoid a potentially acrimonious debate in Toronto City Council as to whether to rehire her. It was later reported she was on a shortlist to be appointed Ontario Ombudsman along with the incumbent André Marin and federal Corrections Investigator Howard Sapers.

=== Hydro One ===
In October 2015, the province of Ontario announced Crean would be appointed as the first ombudsman of Hydro One, a position created in the wake of plans for the province to sell a sixty percent stake in the energy utility.
