= Maol Eoin Ó Crechain =

Maol Eoin Ó Crechain, Archdeacon of Tuam and Doctor of Sacred Theology, died in 1243.

The History of the Popes lists him as an Archdeacon of Tuam, stating that after his return from beyond the sea as a Professor, [he] died in Dublin.

The surname Ó Crechain is now rendered as Crehan, and variations. It is still found in County Galway. A later bearer of the name was Bernard J. Crehan, priest and author (born 2 July 1874).
