= Kelly Crean =

American actress

- Born: Andrea Kelly Crean; September 9, 1974 (age 51); San Clemente, California, United States
- Occupations: Film, television actor
- Years active: 1992-present

Kelly Crean (born September 9, 1974) is an American actress.

== Filmography ==
- Opposite Day (2008) - Cindy
- Bratz: The Movie (2007) - Mrs. Funk
- The Wedding Bells (2007) - Crystal (1 episode)
- Smith (2006) - Denise (1 episode)
- Twenty Good Years (2006) - Maid / Marley (2 episodes)
- Sex, Love & Secrets (2005) - Karla Drake (1 episode)
- McBride: Murder Past Midnight (2005) - Karen
- The Heartbreak Cafe (2004) - Loretta Grey (3 episodes)
- Port Charles (2003) - Harriet Cameron (3 episodes)
- The Stan Freberg Commercials (1999) (segment "In the Park")
- At Home on the Range (1992) - Herself (1993)
