= 2023 BYU Cougars football team =

American college football season

2023 BYU Cougars football
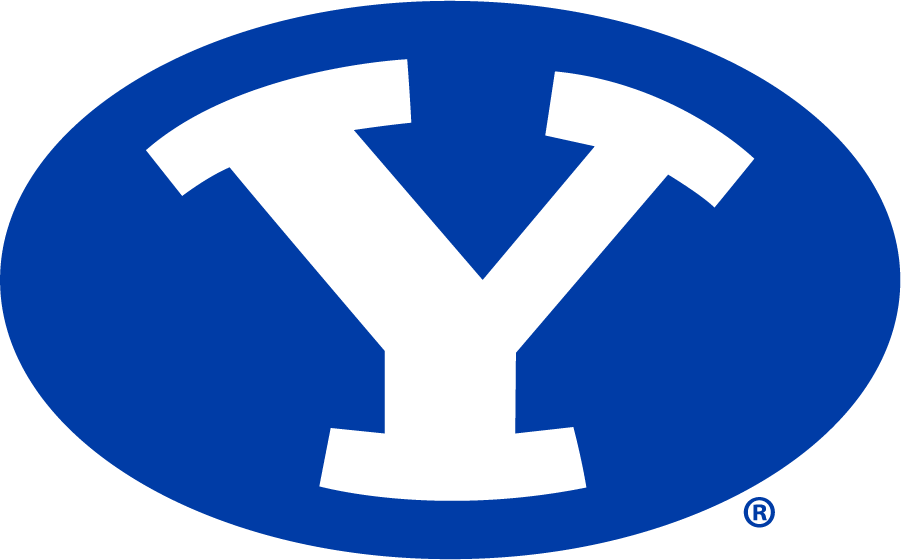
- Conference: Big 12 Conference
- Record: 5–7 (2–7 Big 12)
- Head coach: Kalani Sitake (8th season)
- Offensive coordinator: Aaron Roderick (3rd season)
- Offensive scheme: Power spread
- Defensive coordinator: Jay Hill (1st season)
- Base defense: Multiple 4–3
- Home stadium: LaVell Edwards Stadium

Uniform

2023 Big 12 Conference football standings
	Conf.			Overall
Team	W		L	W		L
No. 3 Texas y$^	8	–	1	12	–	2
No. 16 Oklahoma State y	7	–	2	10	–	4
No. 15 Oklahoma	7	–	2	10	–	3
Iowa State	6	–	3	7	–	6
No. 18 Kansas State	6	–	3	9	–	4
West Virginia	6	–	3	9	–	4
Texas Tech	5	–	4	7	–	6
No. 23 Kansas	5	–	4	9	–	4
UCF	3	–	6	6	–	7
TCU	3	–	6	5	–	7
Houston	2	–	7	4	–	8
BYU	2	–	7	5	–	7
Baylor	2	–	7	3	–	9
Cincinnati	1	–	8	3	–	9
Championship: Texas 49, Oklahoma State 21
^ – College Football Playoff participant; $ – Conference champion; y – Championship game participant; Rankings from AP Poll

The 2023 BYU Cougars football team represented Brigham Young University (BYU) as a member of the Big 12 Conference during the 2023 NCAA Division I FBS football season. The Cougars were led by eighth-year head coach Kalani Sitake and played their home games at LaVell Edwards Stadium. The season was the first year that BYU competed in the Big 12.

== Offseason ==
=== Coaching changes ===
On November 28, 2022 defensive coordinator Ilaisa Tuiaki announced his resignation. On December 7, 2022 Jay Hill was announced as his replacement leaving his head coaching position at Weber State University. Hill was also given the title of associate head coach replacing Ed Lamb who was named the Head coach at Northern Colorado. Preston Hadley joined Lamb at Northern Colorado as the defensive coordinator. Kelly Poppinga returned to BYU after stints with the University of Virginia and Boise State University as the special teams coordinator and defensive assistant. On December 20, 2022, former NFL player Sione Pouha was hired as a defensive assistant coach. On January 2, 2023, it was announced that Kevin Clune was not retained and the final defensive assistant coaching position was announced as Justin Ena who played for the cougars and coached with Hill previously.

=== 2023 recruits ===
Name	Pos.	Height	Weight	Hometown	Notes
Jackson Bowers	TE	6'5"	245	Mesa, Arizona	
Owen Borg	LB	6'2"	200	Draper, Utah	Mission prior to enrolling
Ryder Burton	QB	6'2"	200	Springville, Utah	
Pierson Watson	LB	6'3"	210	Flagstaff, Arizona	Mission prior to enrolling
David Tangilanu	DL	6'5"	255	East Palo Alto, California	Mission prior to enrolling
Jojo Phillips	WR	6'5"	195	Lancaster, California	
Miles Hall	WR	6'2"	205	St. George, Utah	
Siale Esera	LB	6'3"	250	Provo, Utah	
Saimone Davis	DL	6'5"	220	Hau'ula, Hawaii	Mission prior to enrolling
Matthew Fredrick	TE	6'5"	230	Salt Lake City, Utah	Mission prior to enrolling
Talitu'i Pututau	DL	6'5"	260	Salt Lake City, Utah	Mission prior to enrolling
Ethan Thomason	OL	6'8"	320	Fort Collins, Colorado	Mission prior to enrolling
LJ Martin	RB	6'2"	205	El Paso, Texas	
Kevin Doe	WR	6'5"	190	Salt Lake City, Utah	
Motekiai Mo'Unga	DL	6'3"	250	Provo, Utah	Mission prior to enrolling
Jake Hill	WR	6'3"	195	St George, Utah	
Naseri Danielson	DB	6'2"	200	Stockton, California	
Nason Coleman	TE	6'3"	235	Chandler, Arizona	
Jordan Kapisi	K	6'0"	190	Honolulu, Hawaii	

=== 2022 returned missionaries ===
Nukuluve Helu	RB	6'1"	215	Freshman
Ace Kaufusi	LB	6'3"	205	Freshman
Devin Downing	WR	6'2"	190	Freshman
Jake Griffin	OL	6'6"	285	Freshman
Ty Burke	DB	6'1"	175	Freshman
Koa Eldredge	WR	6'0"	195	Freshman
Raider Damuni	DB	6'2"	210	Freshman
Cole Hagen	QB	6'2"	185	Freshman
John Henry Daley	DL	6'5"	225	Freshman
Petey Tuipulotu	DB	6'3"	195	Freshman
Weston Jones	OL	6'5"	255	Freshman
Lucky Finau	LB	6'0"	230	Freshman
Kasen Krebs	LB	6'1"	210	Freshman
Landon Rehkow	P	5'11"	170	Freshman
Matthias Dunn	K	6'0"	175	Freshman
Bentley Redden	TE	6'5"	220	Freshman

=== 2023 other additions ===
Name	Pos.	Height	Weight	Year	Previous school
Kedon Slovis	QB	6'3"	215	Senior	Transfer from University of Pittsburgh
Jayden Dunlap	DB	6'1"	173	Junior	Transfer from Cerritos College
Aidan Robbins	RB	6'3"	230	Junior	Transfer from University of Nevada Las Vegas
Isaiah Bagnah	DL	6'4"	235	Junior	Transfer from Boise State University
Will Ferrin	K	6'3"	175	Sophomore	Transfer from Boise State University
Jackson Cravens	DL	6'2"	305	Junior	Transfer from Boise State University
Weylin Lapuaho	OL	6'4"	310	Sophomore	Transfer from Utah State University
Nuuletau Sellesin	DL	6'1"	240	Sophomore	Transfer from Weber State University
Ian Fitzgerald	OL	6'5"	305	Senior	Transfer from Missouri State University
Jake Retzlaff	QB	6'2"	205	Junior	Transfer from Riverside City College
Paul Maile	OL	6'2"	300	Senior	Transfer from University of Utah
Crew Wakley	DB	6'0"	203	Sophomore	Transfer from Utah State University
Eddie Heckard	DB	5'10"	190	Senior	Transfer from Weber State University
Dylan Flowers	DB	5'11"	180	Sophomore	Transfer from Southern Utah University
David Latu	DL	6'4"	300	Sophomore	Transfer from Snow College
AJ Vongphachanh	LB	6'2"	230	Senior	Transfer from Utah State University
Caleb Etienne	OL	6'7"	325	Junior	Transfer from Oklahoma State University
Jake Eichorn	OL	6'5"	285	Sophomore	Transfer from Weber State University
Darius Lassiter	WR	6'3"	200	Senior	Transfer from Eastern Michigan University
Keelan Marion	WR	6'0"	200	Junior	Transfer from University of Connecticut
Kamden Garrett	DB	5'11"	175	Senior	Transfer from Weber State University
Ray Paulo	TE	6'3"	255	Junior	Transfer from Allan Hancock College
Deion Smith	RB	6'0"	190	Senior	Transfer from University of Colorado
Harrison Taggart	LB	6'1"	216	Freshman	Transfer from University of Oregon
Sione Moa	LB	6'1"	220	Sophomore	Transfer from Utah State University
Simi Moala	OL	6'7"	312	Senior	Transfer from University of Utah
Mata'ava Ta'ase	TE	6'3"	255	Junior	Transfer from Southern Utah University
Joseph Paulo	OL	6'8"	330	Junior	Transfer from San Mateo College
Wyatt Dawe	DL	6'0"	300	Sophomore	Transfer from Southern Utah University
Malae Tanuvasa	DB	6'0"	180	Freshman	Transfer from University of Utah
Marcus Mckenzie	DB	6'0"	172	Freshman	Originally Signed in 2022
Maika Kaufusi	LB	6'4"	210	Freshman	Originally Signed in 2022
Kaden Chidester	DL	6'8"	290	Freshman	Originally Signed in 2022

=== 2023 departures ===
Name	Pos.	Height	Weight	Year	Reason
Matthew Criddle	DB	6'1"	195	Senior	Graduation
Lorenzo Fauatea	DL	6'4"	310	Senior	Graduation
Alden Tofa	DL	6'4"	277	Senior	Graduation
Earl Tuioti-Mariner	DL	6'4"	288	Senior	Graduation
Lane Lunt	TE	6'4"	235	Senior	Graduation
Kaleb Hayes	DB	6'0"	195	Senior	Graduation
Chris Jackson	DB	5'10"	184	Senior	Graduation
Joe Tukuafu	OL	6'4"	300	Senior	Graduation
D'Angelo Mandell	DB	6'1"	192	Senior	Graduation
Christopher Brooks	RB	6'1"	230	Senior	Graduation
Lopini Katoa	RB	6'1"	210	Senior	Graduation
Pepe Tanuvasa	LB	6'1"	245	Senior	Graduation
Houston Heimuli	RB	5'11"	265	Senior	Graduation
Harris LaChance	OL	6'8"	310	Junior	Graduation
Brayden Cosper	WR	6'3"	205	Junior	Graduation
Jake Oldroyd	K	6'1"	195	Junior	Graduation
Gunner Romney	WR	6'2"	195	Junior	Graduation
Jaren Hall	QB	6'1"	205	Junior	NFL Draft
Puka Nacua	WR	6'2"	205	Junior	NFL Draft
Blake Freeland	OT	6'8"	305	Junior	NFL Draft
Payton Wilgar	LB	6'3"	235	Junior	Graduation
Jackson Kaufusi	LB	6'2"	226	Junior	Graduation
Hayden Livingston	DB	6'1"	205	Junior	Graduation
Alema Pilimai	DL	6'4"	275	Junior	Graduation
Gabe Summers	DL	6'2"	295	Junior	Graduation
Carter Wheat	TE	6'4"	236	Junior	Graduation
Britton Hogan	LS	6'3"	200	Junior	Graduation
Jackson McChesney	RB	6'0"	225	Sophomore	Graduation
Masen Wake	TE	6'1"	260	Junior	Graduation
Morgan Pyper	LB	6'2"	215	Junior	Graduation
Dallin Holker	TE	6'5"	240	Sophomore	Transfer
Jacob Conover	QB	6'1"	205	Freshman	Transfer
Campbell Barrington	OL	6'6"	295	Sophomore	Transfer
Terence Fall	WR	6'3"	185	Freshman	Transfer
Tate Romney	LB	6'3"	220	Freshman	Transfer
Logan Fano	DL	6'4"	240	Freshman	Transfer
Keenan Pili	LB	6'3"	237	Junior	Transfer
Nathaniel Gillis	DB	6'1"	174	Freshman	Transfer
Clark Barrington	OL	6'6"	305	Junior	Transfer
Gabe Jeudy-Lally	DB	6'2"	185	Sophomore	Transfer
Korbyn Green	DB	6'0"	175	Freshman	Transfer
Isaiah Perez	DL	6'3"	280	Freshman	Transfer
Talin Togiai	OL	6'5"	320	Freshman	Transfer
Logan Pili	LB	6'1"	225	Freshman	Transfer
George Udo	DB	6'1"	200	Junior	Transfer
Dean Jones	DB	6'2"	205	Sophomore	Transfer
Vae Soifua	OL	6'4"	296	Freshman	Transfer
Cash Peterman	K	6'0"	200	Freshman	Transfer
Samisoni Peaua	DL	6'3"	225	Freshman	Transfer
Sol-Jay Maiava-Peters	QB	6'1"	200	Freshman	Transfer
Kyson Hall	WR	5'11"	182	Freshman	Transfer
Sione Veikoso	OL	6'7"	305	Freshman	
Josh Wilson	LB	6'0"	215	Sophomore	
Tavita Gagnier	LB	6'2"	225	Sophomore	
Hunter Greer	DL	6'5"	275	Freshman	
Carter Krupp	DB	6'1"	210	Freshman	
Donovan Hanna	OL	6'4"	307	Freshman	
Micah Wilson	LB	6'3"	213	Freshman	
Josh Larsen	DL	6'4"	292	Freshman	
Kyle Hester	TE	6'4"	245	Freshman	
Lisala Tai	OL	6'7"	230	Sophomore	
Justen Smith	K	6'2"	205	Sophomore	

== Schedule ==
Date	Time	Opponent	Site	TV	Result	Attendance
September 2	8:15 p.m.	Sam Houston*	LaVell Edwards Stadium; Provo, UT	FS1	W 14–0	59,006
September 9	1:00 p.m.	Southern Utah*	LaVell Edwards Stadium; Provo, UT	ESPN+	W 41–16	60,834
September 16	5:30 p.m.	at Arkansas*	Donald W. Reynolds Razorback Stadium; Fayetteville, AR	ESPN2	W 38–31	74,826
September 23	1:30 p.m.	at Kansas	David Booth Kansas Memorial Stadium; Lawrence, KS	ESPN	L 27–38	47,233
September 29	8:15 p.m.	Cincinnati	LaVell Edwards Stadium; Provo, UT	ESPN	W 35–27	63,834
October 14	1:30 p.m.	at TCU	Amon G. Carter Stadium; Fort Worth, TX	ESPN	L 11–44	44,599
October 21	5:00 p.m.	Texas Tech^{†}	LaVell Edwards Stadium; Provo, UT	FS1	W 27–14	63,523
October 28	1:30 p.m.	at No. 7 Texas	Darrell K Royal–Texas Memorial Stadium; Austin, TX	ABC	L 6–35	101,670
November 4	5:00 p.m.	at West Virginia	Milan Puskar Stadium; Morgantown, WV	FOX	L 7–37	50,266
November 11	8:15 p.m.	Iowa State	LaVell Edwards Stadium; Provo, UT	ESPN	L 13–45	60,754
November 18	10:00 a.m.	No. 14 Oklahoma	LaVell Edwards Stadium; Provo, UT	ESPN	L 24–31	63,714
November 25	1:30 p.m.	at No. 20 Oklahoma State	Boone Pickens Stadium; Stillwater, OK	ABC	L 34–40 ^{2OT}	53,885
*Non-conference game; ^{†}Homecoming; Rankings from AP Poll (and CFP Rankings, after November 1) - Released prior to game; All times are in Mountain time

== Game summaries ==
=== Sam Houston ===
Sam Houston at BYU

Team	1	2	3	4	Total
Bearkats	0	0	0	0	0
• Cougars	7	0	0	7	14

- Date: September 2
- Location: LaVell Edwards Stadium
  Provo, UT
- Game start: 8:20 p.m. MDT
- Elapsed time: 3:20
- Game attendance: 59,006
- Game weather: 74 °F (23 °C), Winds NE 3 mph
- Referee: Dan Scanlan
- TV announcers (FS1): Alex Faust and Petros Papadakis

Brigham Young University entered the season at home against the transitioning FCS to FBS team, Sam Houston State. BYU were favorites to win the game, especially at home.

BYU started off the game with an 8 play, 50 yard drive ending it with a 5-yard Kedon Slovis touchdown run. Two quarters went by with no score attempted by both the Cougars and Bearkats, before an 11-play, 55 yard touchdown drive in the fourth quarter, and Kedon Slovis ended the drive with a 1 yard touchdown run.

The Cougars ended off the game winning 14-0 in their first ever meeting with Sam Houston State.

Scoring summary

Quarter	Time	Drive			Team	Scoring information	Score	
Quarter	Time	Plays	Yards	TOP	Team	Scoring information	SHSU	BYU
1	10:39	8	50	2:54	BYU	Kedon Slovis 5-yard touchdown run, Will Ferrin kick good	0	7
4	14:49	11	55	4:56	BYU	Kedon Slovis 1-yard touchdown run, Will Ferrin kick good	0	14
"TOP" = time of possession. For other American football terms, see Glossary of American football.							0	14

Statistics	SHSU	BYU
First downs	11	12
Plays–yards	57–185	67–257
Rushes–yards	24–38	34–112, 2 TD's
Passing yards	147	145
Passing: comp–att–int	18–33–3	20–33
Turnovers		
Time of possession	28:27	31:33

Team	Category	Player	Statistics
SHSU	Passing	Keegan Shoemaker	18–33–3, 147 yards
SHSU	Rushing	John Gentry	8 carries, 19 yards
SHSU	Receiving	Noah Smith	3 receptions, 44 yards
BYU	Passing	Kedon Slovis	20–33, 145 yards
BYU	Rushing	LJ Martin	16 carries, 91 yards
BYU	Receiving	Darius Lassiter	4 receptions, 43 yards

=== Southern Utah ===
Southern Utah at BYU

Team	1	2	3	4	Total
Thunderbirds	3	0	7	6	16
• Cougars	6	21	7	7	41

- Date: September 9
- Location: LaVell Edwards Stadium
  Provo, UT
- Game start: 1:02 p.m. MDT
- Elapsed time: 3:12
- Game attendance: 60,834
- Game weather: 82 °F (28 °C), Winds NE 3 mph
- Referee: Tutashinda Salaam
- TV announcers (ESPN+): Matt Schumacker, Brad Hopkins, and Shane Sparks

Scoring summary

Quarter	Time	Drive			Team	Scoring information	Score	
Quarter	Time	Plays	Yards	TOP	Team	Scoring information	SUU	BYU
1	7:17	9	52	4:06	SUU	29-yard field goal by Tyler Graham	3	0
1	1:03	9	85	4:23	BYU	Isaac Rex 20-yard touchdown reception from Kedon Slovis, Will Ferrin kick no good	3	6
2	12:36	5	36	2:12	BYU	Keanu Hill 8-yard touchdown reception from Kedon Slovis, Will Ferrin kick good	3	13
2	5:47	8	78	4:22	BYU	Darius Lassiter 8-yard touchdown reception from Kedon Slovis, Will Ferrin kick good	3	20
2	00:30	4	70	0:30	BYU	Deion Smith 2-yard touchdown run, Will Ferrin kick good	3	27
3	11:00	7	75	4:00	SUU	Isaiah Wooden 33-yard touchdown reception from Justin Miller, Tyler Graham kick good	10	27
3	0:36	7	72	3:25	BYU	Kedon Slovis 6-yard touchdown run, Will Ferrin kick good	10	34
4	9:39	1	39	0:09	BYU	Chase Roberts 39-yard touchdown reception from Kedon Slovis, Will Ferrin kick good	10	41
4	5:15	8	75	4:24	SUU	Targhee Lambson 2-yard touchdown run, Tyler Graham kick no good	16	41
"TOP" = time of possession. For other American football terms, see Glossary of American football.							16	41

Statistics	SUU	BYU
First downs	16	18
Plays–yards	60–346	55–394
Rushes–yards	27–84, 1 TD	23–46, 2 TD's
Passing yards	262	348
Passing: comp–att–int	17–33–1, 1 TD	22–32–1, 4 TD's
Turnovers		
Time of possession	31:19	28:41

Team	Category	Player	Statistics
SUU	Passing	Justin Miller	16–30–1, 235 yards, 1 TD
SUU	Rushing	Targhee Lambson	7 carries, 32 yards, 1 TD
SUU	Receiving	Zach Mitchell	7 receptions, 135 yards
BYU	Passing	Kedon Slovis	22–32–1, 348 yards, 4 TD's
BYU	Rushing	LJ Martin	6 carries, 27 yards
BYU	Receiving	Isaac Rex	4 receptions, 112 yards, 1 TD

=== Arkansas ===
BYU at Arkansas

Team	1	2	3	4	Total
• Cougars	14	7	10	7	38
Razorbacks	14	10	7	0	31

- Date: September 16
- Location: Donald W. Reynolds Razorback Stadium
  Fayetteville, AR
- Game start: 6:35 p.m. CDT
- Elapsed time: 3:39
- Game attendance: 74,826
- Game weather: 78 °F (26 °C), Winds NW 3 mph
- Referee: Kevin Boitmann
- TV announcers (ESPN2): Brian Custer, Rod Gilmore, and Lauren Sisler

Scoring summary

Quarter	Time	Drive			Team	Scoring information	Score	
Quarter	Time	Plays	Yards	TOP	Team	Scoring information	BYU	ARK
1	13:21	4	75	1:39	ARK	AJ Green 55-yard touchdown run, Cam Little kick good	0	7
1	11:29				ARK	Punt returned 88 yards for touchdown by Isaiah Sategna, Cam Little kick good	0	14
1	8:28	2	53	0:52	BYU	Deion Smith 37-yard touchdown reception from Parker Kingston, Will Ferrin kick good	7	14
1	2:24	1	45	0:10	BYU	LJ Martin 45-yard touchdown run, Will Ferrin kick good	14	14
2	12:54	10	70	3:20	BYU	LJ Martin 1-yard touchdown run, Will Ferrin kick good	21	14
2	1:43	10	70	5:32	ARK	Luke Hasz 19-yard touchdown reception from KJ Jefferson, Cam Little kick good	21	21
2	0:00	5	36	1:34	ARK	26-yard field goal by Cam Little	21	24
3	11:41	4	53	1:57	ARK	AJ Green 7-yard touchdown run, Cam Little kick good	21	31
3	4:43	6	24	2:31	BYU	43-yard field goal by Will Ferrin	24	31
3	1:52	1	20	0:10	BYU	Parker Kingston 20-yard touchdown reception from Kedon Slovis, Will Ferrin kick good	31	31
4	8:00	9	69	4:46	BYU	Chase Roberts 7-yard touchdown reception from Kedon Slovis, Will Ferrin kick good	38	31
"TOP" = time of possession. For other American football terms, see Glossary of American football.							38	31

Statistics	BYU	ARK
First downs	17	21
Plays–yards	57–281	74–424
Rushes–yards	31–77, 2 TD's	39–177, 2 TD's
Passing yards	204	247
Passing: comp–att–int	14–26, 3 TD's	24–35–1, 1 TD
Turnovers		
Time of possession	24:50	35:10

Team	Category	Player	Statistics
BYU	Passing	Kedon Slovis	13–25, 167 yards, 2 TD's
BYU	Rushing	LJ Martin	23 carries, 77 yards, 2 TD's
BYU	Receiving	Parker Kingston	3 receptions, 46 yards, 1 TD
ARK	Passing	KJ Jefferson	24–35–1, 247 yards, 1 TD
ARK	Rushing	AJ Green	9 carries, 86 yards, 2 TD's
ARK	Receiving	Andrew Armstrong	9 receptions, 86 yards

=== Kansas ===
BYU at Kansas

Team	1	2	3	4	Total
Cougars	7	10	3	7	27
• Jayhawks	14	0	14	10	38

- Date: September 23
- Location: David Booth Kansas Memorial Stadium
  Lawrence, KS
- Game start: 2:35 p.m. CDT
- Elapsed time: 3:14
- Game attendance: 47,233
- Game weather: 80 °F (27 °C), Winds S 9 mph
- Referee: Stephen Baron
- TV announcers (ESPN): Mark Jones, Louis Riddick, and Quint Kessenich

Scoring summary

Quarter	Time	Drive			Team	Scoring information	Score	
Quarter	Time	Plays	Yards	TOP	Team	Scoring information	BYU	KU
1	10:38				KU	Fumble recovery returned 22 yards for touchdown by Cobee Bryant, Seth Keller kick good	0	7
1	5:48	10	75	4:50	BYU	Darius Lassiter 7-yard touchdown reception from Kedon Slovis, Will Ferrin kick good	7	7
1	1:33	8	86	4:10	KU	Trevor Kardell 15-yard touchdown reception from Jalon Daniels, Seth Keller kick good	7	14
2	11:00	13	75	5:25	BYU	LJ Martin 10-yard touchdown reception from Kedon Slovis, Will Ferrin kick good	14	14
2	00:13	12	68	4:07	BYU	33-yard field goal by Will Ferrin	17	14
3	14:38				KU	Interception returned 30 yards for touchdown by Kenny Logan Jr., Seth Keller kick good	17	21
3	10:55	8	58	3:46	BYU	34-yard field goal by Will Ferrin	20	21
3	4:53	10	75	6:05	KU	Luke Grimm 5-yard touchdown reception from Jalon Daniels, Seth Keller kick good	20	28
4	13:36	7	64	3:38	KU	Luke Grimm 13-yard touchdown reception from Jalon Daniels, Seth Keller kick good	20	35
4	8:02	12	75	5:34	BYU	Keelan Marion 6-yard touchdown run, Will Ferrin kick good	27	35
4	1:33	12	69	6:29	KU	23-yard field goal by Seth Keller	27	38
"TOP" = time of possession. For other American football terms, see Glossary of American football.							27	38

Statistics	BYU	KU
First downs	23	23
Plays–yards	73–366	56–351
Rushes–yards	22–9, 1 TD	37–221
Passing yards	357	130
Passing: comp–att–int	30–51–2, 2 TD's	14–19, 3 TD's
Turnovers		
Time of possession	30:05	29:55

Team	Category	Player	Statistics
BYU	Passing	Kedon Slovis	30–51–2, 357 yards, 2 TD's
BYU	Rushing	LJ Martin	11 carries, 28 yards
BYU	Receiving	Chase Roberts	5 receptions, 89 yards
KU	Passing	Jalon Daniels	14–19, 130 yards, 3 TD's
KU	Rushing	Devin Neal	17 carries, 91 yards
KU	Receiving	Lawrence Arnold	4 receptions, 34 yards

=== Cincinnati ===
Cincinnati at BYU

Team	1	2	3	4	Total
Bearcats	0	10	10	7	27
• Cougars	7	7	14	7	35

- Date: September 29
- Location: LaVell Edwards Stadium
  Provo, UT
- Game start: 8:20 p.m. MDT
- Elapsed time: 3:26
- Game attendance: 63,834
- Game weather: 72 °F (22 °C), Winds SE 6 mph
- Referee: Michael VanderValde
- TV announcers (ESPN): Clay Matvick, Aaron Murray, and Lauren Sisler

Scoring summary

Quarter	Time	Drive			Team	Scoring information	Score	
Quarter	Time	Plays	Yards	TOP	Team	Scoring information	CIN	BYU
1	8:28				BYU	Interception returned 42 yards for touchdown by Jakob Robinson, Will Ferrin kick good	0	7
2	10:59	17	90	6:49	CIN	Chamon Metayer 27-yard touchdown reception from Emory Jones, Carter Brown kick good	7	7
2	00:44	9	42	2:49	CIN	33-yard field goal by Carter Brown	10	7
2	0:06	3	82	0:30	BYU	Darius Lassiter 22-yard touchdown reception from Kedon Slovis, Will Ferrin kick good	10	14
3	11:38	5	73	2:02	BYU	LJ Martin 29-yard touchdown run, Will Ferrin kick good	10	21
3	00:44	14	71	6:14	CIN	22-yard field goal by Carter Brown	13	21
3	2:53	4	75	2:31	BYU	Darius Lassiter 22-yard touchdown reception from Kedon Slovis, Will Ferrin kick good	13	28
3	0:59	5	75	1:54	CIN	Chamon Metayer 23-yard touchdown reception from Emory Jones, Carter Brown kick good	20	28
4	12:41	5	15	2:19	BYU	LJ Martin 1-yard touchdown run, Will Ferrin kick good	20	35
4	0:26	8	80	1:10	CIN	Braden Smith 31-yard touchdown reception from Emory Jones, Carter Brown kick good	27	35
"TOP" = time of possession. For other American football terms, see Glossary of American football.							27	35

Statistics	CIN	BYU
First downs	26	17
Plays–yards	84–498	53–295
Rushes–yards	47–242	28–70, 2 TD's
Passing yards	256	225
Passing: comp–att–int	23–37–1, 3 TD's	14–25, 2 TD's
Turnovers		
Time of possession	35:01	24:59

Team	Category	Player	Statistics
CIN	Passing	Emory Jones	23–37–1, 256 yards, 3 TD's
CIN	Rushing	Emory Jones	14 carries, 94 yards
CIN	Receiving	Xzavier Henderson	7 receptions, 74 yards
BYU	Passing	Kedon Slovis	13–24, 223 yards, 2 TD's
BYU	Rushing	LJ Martin	16 carries, 66 yards, 2 TD's
BYU	Receiving	Chase Roberts	6 receptions, 131 yards, 1 TD

=== TCU ===
BYU at TCU

Team	1	2	3	4	Total
Cougars	0	8	3	0	11
• Horned Frogs	14	17	10	3	44

- Date: October 14
- Location: Amon G. Carter Stadium
  Ft. Worth, TX
- Game start: 2:35 p.m. CDT
- Elapsed time: 3:27
- Game attendance: 44,599
- Game weather: 68 °F (20 °C), Winds NW 16 mph
- Referee: Henry Johns
- TV announcers (ESPN): Dave Flemming, Brock Osweiler, and Kayla Burton

Scoring summary

Quarter	Time	Drive			Team	Scoring information	Score	
Quarter	Time	Plays	Yards	TOP	Team	Scoring information	BYU	TCU
"TOP" = time of possession. For other American football terms, see Glossary of American football.								

Statistics	BYU	TCU
First downs	15	30
Plays–yards	66–243	86–584
Rushes–yards	32–91	27–137
Passing yards	152	447
Passing: comp–att–int	15–34–1	38–59–2, 4 TD's
Turnovers		
Time of possession	29:22	30:38

Team	Category	Player	Statistics
BYU	Passing	Kedon Slovis	15–34–1, 152 yards
BYU	Rushing	LJ Martin	14 carries, 56 yards
BYU	Receiving	Chase Roberts	3 receptions, 63 yards
TCU	Passing	Josh Hoover	37–58–2, 439 yards, 4 TD's
TCU	Rushing	Emani Bailey	13 carries, 61 yards
TCU	Receiving	JP Richardson	6 receptions, 104 yards, 1 TD

=== Texas Tech ===
Texas Tech at BYU

Team	1	2	3	4	Total
Red Raiders	0	7	0	7	14
• Cougars	14	10	3	0	27

- Date: October 21
- Location: LaVell Edwards Stadium
  Provo, UT
- Game attendance: 63,534
- Game weather: Sunny, 73 °F (23 °C)
- Referee: Tutashinda Salaam
- TV announcers (FS1 & Gridiron Radio Network): Alex Faust and Petros Papadakis (FS1)
  Noah Britt, Jon Reynolds, and Bob Marshall (Gridiron Radio Network)

Scoring summary

Quarter	Time	Drive			Team	Scoring information	Score	
Quarter	Time	Plays	Yards	TOP	Team	Scoring information	TTU	BYU
1	11:34	7	75	3:26	BYU	Chase Roberts 3-yard touchdown reception from Kedon Slovis, Will Ferrin kick good	0	7
1	2:10				BYU	Fumble recovery returned 5 yards for touchdown by Eddie Heckard, Will Ferrin kick good	0	14
2	9:19	4	66	1:13	TTU	Xavier White 72-yard touchdown reception from Jake Strong, Gino Garcia kick good	7	14
2	6:11	7	81	3:03	BYU	Darius Lassiter 4-yard touchdown reception from Kedon Slovis, Will Ferrin kick good	7	21
3	1:19	6	20	2:50	BYU	41-yard field goal by Will Ferrin	7	27
4	8:41	14	87	4:45	TTU	Tahj Brooks 1-yard touchdown run, Gino Garcia kick good	14	27
"TOP" = time of possession. For other American football terms, see Glossary of American football.							14	27

Statistics	TTU	BYU
First downs	19	12
Plays–yards	80–389	57–277
Rushes–yards	43–153	30–150
Passing yards	236	127
Passing: comp–att–int	19–37–3	15–27–0
Turnovers		
Time of possession	30:55	29:05

Team	Category	Player	Statistics
TTU	Passing	Jake Strong	19/37, 236 yards, TD, 3 INT
TTU	Rushing	Tahj Brooks	31 carries, 105 yards, TD
TTU	Receiving	Xavier White	3 receptions, 98 yards, TD
BYU	Passing	Kedon Slovis	15/27, 127 yards, 2 TD
BYU	Rushing	L. J. Martin	10 carries, 93 yards
BYU	Receiving	Darius Lassiter	4 receptions, 47 yards, TD

=== No. 7 Texas ===
BYU at No. 7 Texas

Team	1	2	3	4	Total
Cougars	0	3	3	0	6
• No. 7 Longhorns	14	7	0	14	35

- Date: October 28
- Location: Darrell K Royal-Texas Memorial Stadium
  Austin, TX
- Game start: 2:41 p.m. CDT
- Game attendance: 101,670
- Game weather: Sunny, 81 °F (27 °C), wind S at 8 mph (13 km/h)
- Referee: Derek Anderson
- TV announcers (ABC): Dave Pasch, Dusty Dvoracek, and Tom Luginbill

Scoring summary

Quarter	Time	Drive			Team	Scoring information	Score	
Quarter	Time	Plays	Yards	TOP	Team	Scoring information	BYU	Texas
1st	12:08	—	—	—	Texas	Punt returned 74 yards for touchdown by Xavier Worthy, Bert Auburn kick good	0	7
1st	04:10	6	26	03:07	Texas	Jonathon Brooks 4-yard touchdown run, Bert Auburn kick good	0	14
2nd	04:57	16	64	09:57	BYU	24-yard field goal by Will Ferrin	3	14
2nd	00:58	10	75	03:59	Texas	Adonai Mitchell 30-yard touchdown reception from Maalik Murphy, Bert Auburn kick good	3	21
3rd	07:58	7	68	03:43	BYU	32-yard field goal by Will Ferrin	6	21
4th	09:07	1	8	00:04	Texas	Adonai Mitchell 13-yard touchdown reception from Maalik Murphy, Bert Auburn kick good	6	28
4th	01:43	3	39	00:58	Texas	Jaydon Blue 34-yard touchdown run, Bert Auburn kick good	6	35
"TOP" = time of possession. For other American football terms, see Glossary of American football.							6	35

Statistics	BYU	UT
First downs	17	16
Plays–yards	66–292	60–354
Rushes–yards	26–95	35–194
Passing yards	197	170
Passing: comp–att–int	25–40–2	16–25–1
Turnovers		
Time of possession	33:06	26:54

Team	Category	Player	Statistics
BYU	Passing	Kedon Slovis	25–40, 197 yards, 2 INT
BYU	Rushing	Aidan Robbins	17 carries, 56 yards
BYU	Receiving	Darius Lassiter	5 receptions, 75 yards
UT	Passing	Maalik Murphy	16–25, 170 yards, 2 TD
UT	Rushing	Jonathon Brooks	16 carries, 98 yards, 1 TD
UT	Receiving	Adonai Mitchell	3 receptions, 59 yards, 2 TD

=== West Virginia ===
BYU at West Virginia

Team	1	2	3	4	Total
Cougars	0	0	0	7	7
• Mountaineers	14	13	10	0	37

- Date: November 4
- Location: Milan Puskar Stadium
  Morgantown, WV
- Game start: 7:15 p.m. EDT
- Elapsed time: 3:27
- Game attendance: 50,266
- Game weather: Clear, 59 °F (15 °C), SW 8 miles per hour (13 km/h)
- Referee: Kevin Boitmann
- Television network: FOX

Scoring summary

Quarter	Time	Drive			Team	Scoring information	Score	
Quarter	Time	Plays	Yards	TOP	Team	Scoring information	BYU	WVU
1st	9:59	11	75	5:01	West Virginia	CJ Donaldson 2-yard touchdown run, Michael Hayes kick good	0	7
1st	6:17	5	52	1:50	West Virginia	CJ Donaldson 1-yard touchdown run, Michael Hayes kick good	0	14
2nd	10:47	6	37	3:03	West Virginia	46-yard field goal by Michael Hayes	0	17
2nd	2:18	10	93	5:35	West Virginia	Preston Fox 12-yard touchdown reception from Garrett Greene, Michael Hayes kick good	0	24
2nd	0:00	9	78	1:05	West Virginia	22-yard field goal by Michael Hayes	0	27
3rd	10:35	8	53	2:44	West Virginia	23-yard field goal by Michael Hayes	0	30
3rd	1:09	7	85	4:14	West Virginia	Kole Taylor 43-yard touchdown reception from Garrett Greene, Michael Hayes kick good	0	37
4th	6:24	8	62	2:57	BYU	Aidan Robbins 10-yard touchdown run, Will Ferrin kick good	7	37
"TOP" = time of possession. For other American football terms, see Glossary of American football.							7	37

Statistics	BYU	WVU
First downs	20	30
Plays–yards	63–277	76–567
Rushes–yards	21–67	48–336
Passing yards	210	231
Passing: comp–att–int	24–42–0	16–28–0
Turnovers		
Time of possession	24:33	35:27

Team	Category	Player	Statistics
BYU	Passing	Jake Retzlaff	24/42, 210 yards
BYU	Rushing	Aidan Robbins	10 carries, 37 yards, TD
BYU	Receiving	Parker Kingston	6 receptions, 57 yards
WVU	Passing	Garrett Greene	12/24, 205 yards, 2 TD
WVU	Rushing	Jahiem White	16 carries, 146 yards
WVU	Receiving	Devin Carter	3 receptions, 56 yards

=== Iowa State ===
Iowa State at BYU

Team	1	2	3	4	Total
• Cyclones	17	14	14	0	45
Cougars	7	0	6	0	13

- Date: November 11
- Location: LaVell Edwards Stadium
  Provo, UT
- Game start: 8:24 p.m. MDT
- Elapsed time: 3:09
- Game attendance: 60,754
- Game weather: clear; NW 3 MPH • Temperature: 43°F
- Referee: Henry Johns
- TV announcers (ESPN): Dave Flemming, Brock Osweiler, Kayla Burton

Scoring summary

Quarter	Time	Drive			Team	Scoring information	Score	
Quarter	Time	Plays	Yards	TOP	Team	Scoring information	ISU	BYU
1st	13:32	3	28	1:16	Iowa State	Jaylin Noel 4-yard touchdown reception from Rocco Becht, Chase Contreraz kick good	7	0
1st	11:34	4	4	1:57	Iowa State	31-yard field goal by Chase Contreraz	10	0
1st	8:47	7	75	2:47	BYU	Jojo Phillips 5-yard touchdown reception from Jake Retzlaff, Will Ferrin kick good	10	7
1st	1:03	9	72	4:49	Iowa State	Eli Sanders 4-yard touchdown run, Chase Contreraz kick good	17	7
2nd	8:02	11	80	5:27	Iowa State	Cartevious Norton 11-yard touchdown run, Chase Contreraz kick good	24	7
2nd	1:28	9	66	5:14	Iowa State	Abu Sama 13-yard touchdown run, Chase Contreraz kick good	31	7
3rd	10:05	7	65	3:31	BYU	Isaac Rex 26-yard touchdown reception from Parker Kingston, Jake Retzlaff kick failed	31	13
3rd	8:27	3	75	1:38	Iowa State	Jaylin Noel 66-yard touchdown reception from Rocco Becht, Chase Contreraz kick good	38	13
3rd	5:36	2	64	0:16	Iowa State	Abu Sama 59-yard touchdown run, Chase Contreraz kick good	45	13
"TOP" = time of possession. For other American football terms, see Glossary of American football.							45	13

Statistics	ISU	BYU
First downs	21	18
Plays–yards	62–443	66–318
Rushes–yards	37–234	38–188
Passing yards	209	130
Passing: comp–att–int	16–25–0	11–28–2
Turnovers		
Time of possession	33:01	26:59

Team	Category	Player	Statistics
ISU	Passing	Rocco Becht	15/23, 203 yards, 2 TD
ISU	Rushing	Abu Sama III	8 carries, 110 yards, 2 TD
ISU	Receiving	Jaylin Noel	5 receptions, 98 yards, 2 TD
BYU	Passing	Jake Retzlaff	10/27, 104 yards, TD, 2 INT
BYU	Rushing	Jake Retzlaff	17 carries, 64 yards
BYU	Receiving	Isaac Rex	3 receptions, 52 yards, TD

=== No. 14 Oklahoma ===
Oklahoma at BYU

Team	1	2	3	4	Total
• No. 14 Sooners	7	10	7	7	31
Cougars	7	10	7	0	24

- Date: November 18
- Location: LaVell Edwards Stadium
  Provo, UT
- Game attendance: 63,714
- Game weather: Cloudy Temperature: 47 °F (8 °C)
- Referee: Derek Anderson
- TV announcers (ESPN): Mark Jones (play-by-play), Louis Riddick (analyst) & Quint Kessenich (sideline)

Scoring summary

Quarter	Time	Drive			Team	Scoring information	Score	
Quarter	Time	Plays	Yards	TOP	Team	Scoring information	OU	BYU
1st	8:04	7	85	3:17	Oklahoma	Nic Anderson 3-yard touchdown reception from Dillon Gabriel, Zach Schmit kick good	7	0
1st	3:05	10	75	4:59	BYU	Chase Roberts 23-yard touchdown reception from Jake Retzlaff, Will Ferrin kick good	7	7
2nd	13:06	7	52	2:16	Oklahoma	Jayden Gibson 27-yard touchdown reception from Dillon Gabriel, Zach Schmit kick good	14	7
2nd	7:49	10	75	5:17	BYU	Isaac Rex 1-yard touchdown reception from Jake Retzlaff, Will Ferrin kick good	14	14
2nd	2:43	12	71	5:06	Oklahoma	23-yard field goal by Zach Schmit	17	14
2nd	0:00	11	33	2:43	BYU	49-yard field goal by Will Ferrin	17	17
3rd	5:55	4	58	1:55	Oklahoma	Interception returned 100 yards for touchdown by Billy Bowman Jr., Zach Schmit kick good	24	17
3rd	1:19	8	75	4:36	BYU	Jake Retzlaff 10-yard touchdown run, Will Ferrin kick good	24	24
4th	7:57	3	25	0:46	Oklahoma	Gavin Sawchuk 16-yard touchdown run, Zach Schmit kick good	31	24
"TOP" = time of possession. For other American football terms, see Glossary of American football.							31	24

Statistics	OU	BYU
First downs	20	18
Plays–yards	368	390
Rushes–yards	34–144	38–217
Passing yards	224	173
Passing: comp–att–int	18–30–0	15–26–1
Turnovers		
Time of possession	28:50	31:10

Team	Category	Player	Statistics
OU	Passing	Dillon Gabriel	13/21, 191 yards, 2 TD
OU	Rushing	Gavin Sawchuk	14 carries, 107 yards, TD
OU	Receiving	Jalil Farooq	5 receptions, 53 yards
BYU	Passing	Jake Retzlaff	15/26, 173 yards, 2 TD, INT
BYU	Rushing	Aidan Robbins	22 carries, 182 yards
BYU	Receiving	Kody Epps	6 receptions, 90 yards

=== No. 20 Oklahoma State ===
BYU at Oklahoma State

Team	1	2	3	4	OT	2OT	Total
Cougars	7	17	0	3	7	0	34
• No. 20 Cowboys	6	0	7	14	7	6	40

- Date: November 25
- Location: Boone Pickens Stadium
  Stillwater, OK
- Game attendance: 53,865
- Game weather: Cloudy • Temperature: 40
- Referee: Michael Vandervelde
- TV announcers (ABC): Anish Schroff (play-by-play), Andre Ward (analyst) & Paul Carcaterra (sideline)

Scoring summary

Quarter	Time	Drive			Team	Scoring information	Score	
Quarter	Time	Plays	Yards	TOP	Team	Scoring information	BYU	OS0U
"TOP" = time of possession. For other American football terms, see Glossary of American football.								

Statistics	BYU	OSU
First downs	14	28
Plays–yards	69–327	88–503
Rushes–yards	37–130	41–182
Passing yards	197	321
Passing: comp–att–int	15–31–0	31–47–2
Turnovers		
Time of possession	25:30	34:30

Team	Category	Player	Statistics
BYU	Passing	Jake Retzlaff	14/30, 161 yards
BYU	Rushing	Aidan Robbins	16 carries, 74 yards
BYU	Receiving	Keanu Hill	2 receptions, 69 yards
OSU	Passing	Alan Bowman	31/47, 321 yards, 2 INT
OSU	Rushing	Ollie Gordon II	34 carries, 166 yards, 5 TD
OSU	Receiving	Leon Johnson III	9 receptions, 132 yards

== Personnel ==
=== Coaching staff ===
Name	Position
Kalani Sitake	Head coach
Jay Hill	Assistant head coach/defensive coordinator/safeties coach
Kelly Poppinga	Special teams coordinator/defensive ends coach
Aaron Roderick	Offensive coordinator/quarterbacks coach
Darrell Funk	Offensive line coach
Fesi Sitake	Passing game coordinator/wide receivers coach
Justin Ena	Linebackers coach
Steve Clark	Tight ends coach
Jernaro Gilford	Cornerbacks coach
Harvey Unga	Running backs coach
Sione Po'uha	Defensive tackles coach

=== Roster ===
2023 BYU Cougars football team roster
Players
Coaches
Offense

Pos.	#	Name	Class
QB	15	Nick Billoups	So
QB	18	Ryder Burton	Fr
QB	11	Cade Fennegan	So
QB	16	Cole Hagen	Fr
QB	12	Jake Retzlaff	Jr
QB	10	Kedon Slovis	Sr
OL	79	Kaden Chidester	Fr
OL	75	Sam Dawe	Fr
OL	56	Jake Eichorn	So
OL	76	Caleb Etienne	Jr
OL	68	Peter Falaniko	Fr
OL	65	Ian Fitzgerald	Sr
OL	77	Jake Griffin	Fr
OL	73	Weston Jones	Fr
OL	64	Brayden Keim	Jr
OL	61	Weylin Lapuaho	So
OL	60	Tyler Little	So
OL	54	Paul Maile	Sr
OL	51	Sonny Makasini	Fr
OL	69	Simi Moala	Sr
OL	74	Trevin Ostler	Fr
OL	55	Joseph Paulo	So
OL	70	Connor Pay	Jr
OL	78	Kingsley Suamataia	So
OL	52	Ben Ward	Jr
RB	4	Miles Davis	So
RB	20	Nukuluve Helu	Fr
RB	27	LJ Martin	Fr
RB	21	Enoch Nawahine	So
RB	3	Aidan Robbins	Jr
RB	7	Hinckley Ropati (injured)	Sr
RB	20	Deion Smith	Sr
TE	41	Jackson Bowers	Fr
TE	49	Nason Coleman	Fr
TE	87	Ethan Erickson	So
TE	22	Mason Fakahua	Jr
TE	85	Anthony Olsen	Fr
TE	42	Ray Paulo	Jr
TE	35	Bentley Redden	Fr
TE	83	Isaac Rex	Jr
TE	99	Mata'ava Ta'ase	Jr
WR	31	Kevin Doe	Fr
WR	88	Devin Downing	Fr
WR	80	Koa Eldredge	Fr
WR	0	Kody Epps	So
WR	36	Talmage Gunther	Jr
WR	30	Miles Hall	Fr
WR	86	Dom Henry	Fr
WR	29	Jake Hill	Fr
WR	1	Keanu Hill	Jr
WR	82	Parker Kingston	Fr
WR	5	Darius Lassiter	Sr
WR	17	Keelan Marion	Jr
WR	89	Kade Moore	So
WR	23	Hobbs Nyberg	Jr
WR	19	Jojo Phillips	Fr
WR	2	Chase Roberts	So

Defense

Pos.	#	Name	Class
DB	25	Talan Alfrey	So
DB	35	Zion Allen	Fr
DB	19	Mory Bamba	Jr
DB	20	Jacob Boren	Sr
DB	32	Ty Burke	Fr
DB	4	Caleb Christensen	So
DB	33	Raider Damuni	Fr
DB	43	Naseri Danielson	Fr
DB	29	Jayden Dunlap	Jr
DB	23	Chika Ebunoha	Fr
DB	21	Dylan Flowers	So
DB	7	Kamden Garrett	Sr
DB	1	Micah Harper (injured)	So
DB	5	Eddie Heckard	Sr
DB	36	Evan Johnson	Fr
DB	27	Marcus Mckenzie	Fr
DB	12	Malik Moore	Sr
DB	17	Preston Rex	Fr
DB	30	Quenton Rice	So
DB	0	Jakob Robinson	Jr
DB	26	Ethan Slade	So
DB	37	Malae Tanuvasa	Fr
DB	42	Petey Tuipulotu	Fr
DB	38	Crew Wakley	So
DB	28	Tanner Wall (injured)	So
DL	13	Isaiah Bagnah	Jr
DL	92	Tyler Batty	Jr
DL	91	Jackson Cravens	Jr
DL	46	John Henry Daley	Fr
DL	45	Michael Daley	So
DL	98	Wyatt Dawe	So
DL	95	Caden Haws	Jr
DL	90	David Latu	So
DL	59	Logan Lutui	Jr
DL	93	Blake Mangelson	So
DL	62	Atunaisa Mahe	Sr
DL	96	Bruce Mitchell	So
DL	58	Aisea Moa	Fr
DL	94	John Nelson	So
DL	48	Bodie Schoonover	Fr
DL	56	Nuuletau Sellesin	So
DL	99	Joshua Singh	So
LB	3	Chaz Ah You	Sr
LB	2	Ben Bywater (injured)	Jr
LB	54	Siale Esera	Fr
LB	49	Lucky Finau	Fr
LB	16	Isaiah Glasker	Fr
LB	22	Ammon Hannemann	Jr
LB	53	Fisher Jackson	Jr
LB	18	Ace Kaufusi	Fr
LB	34	Maika Kaufusi	Fr
LB	50	Kason Krebs	Fr
LB	41	Sione Moa	Fr
LB	11	Harrison Taggart	Fr
LB	31	Max Tooley	Sr
LB	10	AJ Vongphachanh	Sr

Special teams

Pos.	#	Name	Class
DS	84	Austin Riggs	Jr
DS	54	Dalton Riggs	Fr
P	39	Landon Rehkow	Fr
P	24	Ryan Rehkow	Jr
K	97	Matthias Dunn	Fr
K	44	Will Ferrin	So
K	37	Jordan Kapisi	Fr

Head coach

- Kalani Sitake (BYU)

Coordinators/assistant coaches

- Jay Hill (Utah)
  Associate head coach, Defensive coordinator/safeties
- Aaron Roderick (BYU)
  Offensive coordinator/quarterbacks
- Kelly Poppinga (BYU)
  Special teams coordinator/defensive ends
- Darrell Funk (Colorado State)
  Offensive line
- Fesi Sitake (Southern Utah)
  Passing Game Coordintor/wide receivers
- Steve Clark (BYU)
  Tight ends
- Harvey Unga (BYU)
  Running backs
- Justin Ena (BYU)
  Linebackers
- Jernaro Gilford (BYU)
  Cornerbacks
- Sione Po'uha (Utah)
  Defensive tackles

Legend

- (C) Team captain
- (S) Suspended
- (I) Ineligible
- Injured
- Redshirt

Roster

=== Depth chart ===
Defense

FS
Crew Wakley
Preston Rex
Malik Moore

WLB	MLB	SLB
Max Tooley	Harrison Taggart	AJ Vongphachanh
Ammon Hannemann	Siale Esera	Sione Moa
Chaz Ah You	Ace Kaufusi	Fisher Jackson

SS
Ethan Slade
Chika Ebunoha
Raider Damuni

CB
Eddie Heckard
Mory Bamba
Evan Johnson

DE	DT	DT	DE
Tyler Batty	Atunaisa Mahe	Jackson Cravens	Isaiah Bagnah
Blake Mangelson	Caden Haws	John Nelson	John Henry Daley
Bodie Schoonover	Joshua Singh	David Latu	Logan Lutui

CB
Jakob Robinson
Kamden Garrett
Caleb Christensen

Offense

X-Receiver
Chase Roberts
Kody Epps
Keelan Marion

LT	LG	C	RG	RT
Kingsley Suamataia	Paul Maile	Connor Pay	Weylin Lapuaho	Brayden Keim
Simi Moala	Ian Fitzgerald	Paul Maile	Caleb Etienne	Tyler Little
Jake Griffin	Sonny Makasini	Peter Falaniko	Jake Eichorn	Ben Ward

TE
Isaac Rex
Mata'ava Ta'ase
Jackson Bowers

Z-Receiver
Keanu Hill
Darius Lassiter
Parker Kingston

QB
Kedon Slovis
Jake Retzlaff
Cade Fennegan

Key reserves
TE Ethan Erickson
RB Miles Davis
DB Jacob Boren
DB Marcus McKenzie
DL Aisea Moa
WR Jojo Phillips
WR Talmage Gunther
LB Isaiah Glasker

RB
LJ Martin
Deion Smith
Aidan Robbins

FB
Mason Fakahua
Ray Paulo
Nason Coleman

Special teams
PK Will Ferrin
PK Matthias Dunn
P Ryan Rehkow
P Landon Rehkow
KR Hobbs Nyborg
KR Parker Kingston
PR Hobbs Nyborg
PR Parker Kingston
LS Austin Riggs
LS Dalton Riggs
H Ryan Rehkow
H Talmage Gunther
