= 2023 TCU Horned Frogs football team =

American college football season

2023 TCU Horned Frogs football
- Conference: Big 12 Conference
- Record: 5–7 (3–6 Big 12)
- Head coach: Sonny Dykes (2nd season)
- Offensive coordinator: Kendal Briles (1st season)
- Co-offensive coordinator: A. J. Ricker (2nd season)
- Offensive scheme: Bear raid
- Defensive coordinator: Joe Gillespie (2nd season)
- Base defense: 3–3–5
- Home stadium: Amon G. Carter Stadium

2023 Big 12 Conference football standings
	Conf.			Overall
Team	W		L	W		L
No. 3 Texas y$^	8	–	1	12	–	2
No. 16 Oklahoma State y	7	–	2	10	–	4
No. 15 Oklahoma	7	–	2	10	–	3
Iowa State	6	–	3	7	–	6
No. 18 Kansas State	6	–	3	9	–	4
West Virginia	6	–	3	9	–	4
Texas Tech	5	–	4	7	–	6
No. 23 Kansas	5	–	4	9	–	4
UCF	3	–	6	6	–	7
TCU	3	–	6	5	–	7
Houston	2	–	7	4	–	8
BYU	2	–	7	5	–	7
Baylor	2	–	7	3	–	9
Cincinnati	1	–	8	3	–	9
Championship: Texas 49, Oklahoma State 21
^ – College Football Playoff participant; $ – Conference champion; y – Championship game participant; Rankings from AP Poll

The 2023 TCU Horned Frogs football team represented Texas Christian University (TCU) in the Big 12 Conference during the 2023 NCAA Division I FBS football season. The Horned Frogs were led by Sonny Dykes in his second season as their head coach.

The Horned Frogs played their home games at Amon G. Carter Stadium in Fort Worth, Texas.

The Horned Frogs failed to qualify for a bowl game after making the National Championship game the previous season and suffered their first losing season since 2021 following their loss to Oklahoma. TCU became the first program to miss a bowl game and/or have a losing record after becoming national championship runner-ups since Texas in 2010.

== Offseason ==
=== Recruiting class ===
College recruiting (2023)
Name	Hometown	School	Height	Weight	Commit date
Randon Fontenette; ATH	Freeport, TX	Brazosport High	6 ft 2 in (1.88 m)	195 lb (88 kg)	Dec 16, 2022
Randon Fontenette; ATH	Recruit ratings: Rivals: 247Sports: ESPN: (80)				
Channing Canada; DB	Athens, TX	Trinity Valley CC	6 ft 0 in (1.83 m)	185 lb (84 kg)	Dec 15, 2022
Channing Canada; DB	Recruit ratings: Rivals: 247Sports: ESPN: (80)				
Markis Deal; DT	Garland, TX	Naaman Forest High	6 ft 5 in (1.96 m)	287 lb (130 kg)	Nov 20, 2022
Markis Deal; DT	Recruit ratings: Rivals: 247Sports: ESPN: (82)				
Javeon Wilcox; DB	Temple, TX	Lake Belton High	6 ft 1 in (1.85 m)	187 lb (85 kg)	Jun 16, 2022
Javeon Wilcox; DB	Recruit ratings: Rivals: 247Sports: ESPN: (78)				
Avion Carter; DE	Amarillo, TX	Tascosa High	6 ft 5 in (1.96 m)	252 lb (114 kg)	Jun 12, 2022
Avion Carter; DE	Recruit ratings: Rivals: 247Sports: ESPN: (82)				
Cordale Russell; WR	Mesquite, TX	North Mesquite High	6 ft 3 in (1.91 m)	200 lb (91 kg)	May 14, 2022
Cordale Russell; WR	Recruit ratings: Rivals: 247Sports: ESPN: (81)				
Mason White; DB	Walnut, CA	Mt. San Antonio	6 ft 1 in (1.85 m)	177 lb (80 kg)	Dec 21, 2022
Mason White; DB	Recruit ratings: Rivals: 247Sports: ESPN: (79)				
Jamel Johnson; DB	Arlington, TX	Seguin High	6 ft 1 in (1.85 m)	175 lb (79 kg)	Dec 16, 2022
Jamel Johnson; DB	Recruit ratings: Rivals: 247Sports: ESPN: (80)				
Max Carroll; LB	Eads, TN	Briarcrest Christian School	6 ft 3 in (1.91 m)	205 lb (93 kg)	Aug 12, 2022
Max Carroll; LB	Recruit ratings: Rivals: 247Sports: ESPN: (79)				
Vernon Glover Jr. DB	Dickinson, TX	Dickinson High	6 ft 0 in (1.83 m)	170 lb (77 kg)	Jul 31, 2022
Vernon Glover Jr. DB	Recruit ratings: Rivals: 247Sports: ESPN: (77)				
Kylan Salter; LB	Cedar Hill, TX	Cedar Hill High	6 ft 2 in (1.88 m)	205 lb (93 kg)	Jul 28, 2022
Kylan Salter; LB	Recruit ratings: Rivals: 247Sports: ESPN: (77)				
Cameron Cook; RB	Round Rock, TX	Stony Point High	5 ft 10 in (1.78 m)	180 lb (82 kg)	Jul 26, 2022
Cameron Cook; RB	Recruit ratings: Rivals: 247Sports: ESPN: (80)				
Keviyan Huddleston; DE	Tyler, TX	Chapel Hill High	6 ft 4 in (1.93 m)	232 lb (105 kg)	Jul 8, 2022
Keviyan Huddleston; DE	Recruit ratings: Rivals: 247Sports: ESPN: (78)				
Jonathan Bax; DE	New Orleans, LA	Edna Karr High	6 ft 3 in (1.91 m)	235 lb (107 kg)	Jul 4, 2022
Jonathan Bax; DE	Recruit ratings: Rivals: 247Sports: ESPN: (77)				
Benjamin Whitfield; OL	Duncanville, TX	Duncanville High	6 ft 5 in (1.96 m)	270 lb (120 kg)	Jun 30, 2022
Benjamin Whitfield; OL	Recruit ratings: Rivals: 247Sports: ESPN: (77)				
Narado Stoker; DB	Dallas, TX	South Oak Cliff High	6 ft 5 in (1.96 m)	290 lb (130 kg)	Jun 29, 2022
Narado Stoker; DB	Recruit ratings: Rivals: 247Sports: ESPN: (75)				
Jordan Lester; DB	Mesquite, TX	Horn High	6 ft 2 in (1.88 m)	175 lb (79 kg)	Jun 18, 2022
Jordan Lester; DB	Recruit ratings: Rivals: 247Sports: ESPN: (75)				
Cooper Powers; OL	Concord, CA	De La Salle High	6 ft 5 in (1.96 m)	285 lb (129 kg)	Jun 11, 2022
Cooper Powers; OL	Recruit ratings: Rivals: 247Sports: ESPN: (78)				
Lafayette Kaiuway; TE	Arlington, TX	Sam Houston High	6 ft 6 in (1.98 m)	230 lb (100 kg)	May 27, 2022
Lafayette Kaiuway; TE	Recruit ratings: Rivals: 247Sports: ESPN: (79)				
Zachary Chapman; DE	Fort Bend, TX	Thurgood Marshall High	6 ft 6 in (1.98 m)	250 lb (110 kg)	May 24, 2022
Zachary Chapman; DE	Recruit ratings: Rivals: 247Sports: ESPN: (74)				
Brione Ramsey-Brooks; OL	Dallas, TX	South Oak Cliff High	6 ft 5 in (1.96 m)	400 lb (180 kg)	May 20, 2022
Brione Ramsey-Brooks; OL	Recruit ratings: Rivals: 247Sports: ESPN: (78)				
Rohan Fluellen; WR	Gilmer, TX	Gilmer High	6 ft 0 in (1.83 m)	170 lb (77 kg)	Apr 29, 2022
Rohan Fluellen; WR	Recruit ratings: Rivals: 247Sports: ESPN: (77)				
Jordyn Bailey; WR	Denton, TX	Billy Ryan High	5 ft 9 in (1.75 m)	163 lb (74 kg)	Jan 9, 2022
Jordyn Bailey; WR	Recruit ratings: Rivals: 247Sports: ESPN: (80)				
Overall recruit ranking: Rivals: #21 247Sports: #95
Note: In many cases, Scout, Rivals, 247Sports, On3, and ESPN may conflict in their listings of height and weight.; In these cases, the average was taken. ESPN grades are on a 100-point scale.; Sources: "Rivals commits". Rivals.; "ESPN commits". ESPN.; "2023 Team Ranking". Rivals.com.; "247Sports commits". 247Sports.

=== NFL draft ===
Eight Horned Frogs were selected in the 2023 NFL Draft.

Player	Position
Quentin Johnston	WR
Steve Avila	OG
Kendre Miller	RB
Dylan Horton	DE
Derius Davis	WR
Tre Tomlinson	CB
Dee Winters	LB
Max Duggan	QB

=== Transfers ===
==== Outgoing ====
Player	Position	Destination
Caleb Medford	WR	New Mexico
Sam Jackson	QB	California
Marvin Covington	CB	New Mexico
Kee'yon Stewart	CB	Arkansas
D'Arco Perkins-McAllister	S	New Mexico
Quincy Brown	WR	Nicholls State
Colt Ellison	DE	Unknown
Geor'quarius Spivey	TE	Mississippi State
Doug Blue-Eli	DL	South Florida
Blair Conwright	WR	North Texas
Altrique Barlow	OT	Marshall
Deshawn McCuin	S	San Diego State
Noah Daniels	CB	Unknown
Keontae Jenkins	CB	Coastal Carolina
Jordan Hudson	WR	SMU
Kyron Chambers	CB	SMU
Noah Bolticoff	OT	Indiana
Landyn Watson	DL	Marshall
Alexander Honig	TE	UConn

==== Incoming ====
Player	Position	Previous school
Tommy Brockermeyer	OT	Alabama
JoJo Earle	WR	Alabama
Trey Sanders	RB	Alabama
Warren Thompson	WR	Arkansas
Rick D'Abreu	DL	East Carolina
Avery Helm	CB	Florida
Willis Patrick	OL	Jackson State
Jack Bech	TE	LSU
Coltin Deery	OL	Maryland
Dylan Wright	WR	Minnesota
Tico Brown	DL	Missouri State
John Paul Richardson	WR	Oklahoma State
Jaylon Robinson	WR	Ole Miss

== Schedule ==
Date	Time	Opponent	Rank	Site	TV	Result	Attendance
September 2	11:00 a.m.	Colorado*	No. 17	Amon G. Carter Stadium; Fort Worth, TX (Big Noon Kickoff)	FOX	L 42–45	53,294
September 9	7:00 p.m.	Nicholls*		Amon G. Carter Stadium; Fort Worth, TX	ESPN+	W 41–6	45,010
September 16	7:00 p.m.	at Houston		TDECU Stadium; Houston, TX	FOX	W 36–13	36,049
September 23	11:00 a.m.	SMU*		Amon G. Carter Stadium; Fort Worth, TX (rivalry)	FS1	W 34–17	51,243
September 30	7:00 p.m.	West Virginia		Amon G. Carter Stadium; Fort Worth, TX	ESPN2	L 21–24	43,736
October 7	7:00 p.m.	at Iowa State		Jack Trice Stadium; Ames, IA	FS1	L 14–27	60,535
October 14	2:30 p.m.	BYU^{†}		Amon G. Carter Stadium; Fort Worth, TX	ESPN	W 44–11	44,599
October 21	6:00 p.m.	at Kansas State		Bill Snyder Family Football Stadium; Manhattan, KS	ESPN2	L 3–41	52,580
November 2	6:00 p.m.	at Texas Tech		Jones AT&T Stadium; Lubbock, TX (rivalry)	FS1	L 28–35	51,185
November 11	6:30 p.m.	No. 7 Texas		Amon G. Carter Stadium; Fort Worth, TX (rivalry)	ABC	L 26–29	50,812
November 18	2:30 p.m.	Baylor		Amon G. Carter Stadium; Fort Worth, TX (The Revivalry)	ESPN+	W 42–17	42,621
November 24	11:00 a.m.	at No. 13 Oklahoma		Gaylord Family Oklahoma Memorial Stadium; Norman, OK	FOX	L 45–69	86,112
*Non-conference game; ^{†}Homecoming; Rankings from AP Poll (and CFP Rankings, after November 2) - Released prior to game; All times are in Central time

== Rankings ==
Ranking movements Legend: ██ Increase in ranking ██ Decrease in ranking — = Not ranked RV = Received votes
	Week															
Poll	Pre	1	2	3	4	5	6	7	8	9	10	11	12	13	14	Final
AP	17	RV	RV	RV	RV	—	—	—	—	—	—	—	—	—		
Coaches	16	RV	RV	RV	RV	—	—	—	—	—	—	—	—	—		
CFP	Not released									—	—	—	—	—		Not released

== Roster ==
2023 TCU Horned Frogs football team roster
Players
Coaches
Offense

Pos.	#	Name	Class
RB	0	Cam Cook	Fr
WR	1	Cordale Russell	Fr
RB	2	Trey Sanders	Jr
WR	3	Savion Williams	Jr
QB	4	Chandler Morris	So
WR	6	Chase Jackson	So
WR	7	John Paul Richardson	Jr
RB	9	Emani Bailey	Jr
QB	10	Josh Hoover	Fr
WR	11	JoJo Earle	Jr
TE	12	Lafayette Kaiuway	Fr
QB	13	Luke Pardee	So
WR	13	Jaylon Robinson	Sr
WR	14	DJ Allen	Fr
QB	15	Grant Tisdale	Sr
WR	16	Dylan Wright	Jr
RB	17	Trent Battle	So
WR	18	Jack Bech	Jr
TE	19	Jared Wiley	Sr
WR	20	Rohan Fluellen	Fr
RB	21	Corey Wren	Jr
WR	22	Major Everhart	Fr
RB	23	Derrick Carroll	Fr
RB	24	Brant Ahlfinger	Fr
WR	27	Jordyn Bailey	Fr
QB	27	Jimmy Weirick	Sr
QB	29	Jacob Porter	Fr
WR	35	Colton Dobson	So
WR	36	Joe Laterza	So
RB	40	Franklin Estrada II	So
WR	41	Hunter Krepp	Fr
TE	42	Brent Matiscik	Jr
WR	43	Joe Staubach	Fr
TE	44	Ben Reppenhagen	So
TE	49	Austin Sheets	So
OL	50	Brione Ramsey-Brooks	Fr
OL	51	Coltin Deery	So
OL	52	Ezra Dotson-Oyetade	So
OL	53	John Lanz	Sr
OL	54	Quinton Harris	Fr
OL	55	Robby Rochester	So
OL	56	Ben Taylor-Whitfield	Fr
OL	61	Riley Self	So
OL	64	Jackson McNeff	Fr
OL	65	Mike Stoker	Fr
OL	67	Hudson White	So
OL	68	Michael Nichols	Jr
OL	69	Gannon Gaubert	Fr
OL	71	Marcus Williams	Jr
OL	72	Jasper Lott	So
OL	73	Willis Patrick	Sr
OL	74	Andrew Coker	Jr
OL	76	Garrett Hayes	Jr
OL	77	Brandon Coleman	Sr
OL	78	Cooper Powers	Fr
OL	79	Tommy Brockermeyer	So
TE	80	D'Andre Rogers	So
TE	81	Chase Curtis	Sr
WR	83	Keagan Cunningham	So
WR	84	Warren Thompson	Sr
WR	85	Parker Clark	Fr
WR	86	Drew Scott	Sr
WR	87	Blake Nowell	Jr
TE	88	Curtis Raymond III	Sr
WR	89	Stayton Ankrom	Fr

Defense

Pos.	#	Name	Class
LB	0	Shadrach Banks	Jr
DB	1	Abe Camara	Jr
DB	2	Josh Newton	Sr
DB	3	Mark Perry	Sr
LB	4	Namdi Obiazor	Jr
LB	6	Jamoi Hodge	Sr
DB	7	Channing Canada	So
LB	9	Marcel Brooks	Jr
LB	10	Thomas Armstrong	Jr
DB	11	Chace Biddle	So
LB	12	Terrence Cooks Jr.	So
DB	13	Mason White	Jr
DB	14	Randon Fontenette	Fr
DB	15	Josh Foster	Sr
DB	16	Jaionte McMillan	So
LB	17	Jonathan Bax	Fr
DB	18	Ish Burdine	Jr
DB	20	Ronald Lewis	Fr
DB	21	Bud Clark	So
DB	22	Jordan Lester	Fr
DB	23	Javeon Wilcox	Fr
DB	24	Avery Helm	Jr
DB	25	Jamel Johnson	Fr
DB	26	Vernon Glover	Fr
DB	28	Millard Bradford	Sr
LB	30	Kylan Salter	Fr
DB	31	Jake Milliman	Fr
DB	32	Kevin Ward	So
LB	33	Max Carroll	Fr
LB	34	Zach Marcheselli	Jr
DB	35	Joshua Spaeth	Fr
LB	36	Ryan Quintanar	So
LB	37	Hudson Hooper	Fr
LB	39	Matthew Kerr	So
DL	40	Keviyan Huddleston	Fr
LB	41	TJ Willson	Fr
DL	42	Zachary Chapman	Fr
LB	43	Blake Baldwin	So
DL	44	Rick D'Abreu	Sr
DB	46	Daveion Crawford	Sr
LB	47	Jake Boozer	So
LB	51	Luke Lingard	So
DL	52	Damonic Williams	So
DL	55	Blake Jones	Fr
LB	57	Johnny Hodges	Jr
DL	58	Trenton Dickey	Jr
DL	59	Tico Brown	Sr
DL	90	Caleb Fox	Jr
DL	91	Tymon Mitchell	Jr
DL	92	Luke Dodds	So
DL	94	Micheal Ibukun-Okeyode	Fr
DL	95	Markis Deal	Fr
DL	96	Connor Lingren	Fr
DL	97	Paul Oyewale	Fr
DL	98	Avion Carter	Fr
DL	99	Soni Misi	Sr

Special teams

Pos.	#	Name	Class
P	31	Jordy Sandy	Sr
LS	36	Joe Laterza	So
K	39	Griffin Kell	Sr
K/P	97	Easton Black	Fr
LS	98	Logan Frederic	Fr
K	99	Luke Laminack	So

Head coach

- Sonny Dykes

Coordinators/assistant coaches

- Malcolm Kelly (assistant head coach /outside receivers)
- Kendal Briles (offensive coordinator/quarterbacks)
- Joe Gillespie (defensive coordinator/linebackers)
- A. J. Ricker (co-offensive coordinator/offensive line)
- Carlton Buckels (cornerbacks)
- Paul Gonzales (safeties)
- Anthony Jones Jr. (running backs/run game coordinator)
- Jamarkus McFarland (defensive line)
- Doug Meacham (inside wide receivers)
- Mark Tommerdahl (special teams)

Legend

- (C) Team captain
- (S) Suspended
- (I) Ineligible
- Injured
- Redshirt

Roster
Last update: September 2, 2023

== Game summaries ==
=== vs Colorado ===
Colorado Buffaloes (0-0) vs No. 17 TCU Horned Frogs (0-0) – Game summary

Quarter	1	2	3	4	Total
Buffaloes	7	10	14	14	45
No. 17 Horned Frogs	0	14	14	14	42

at Amon G. Carter Stadium • Fort Worth, Texas

- Date: September 2nd
- Game time: 11:00 a.m. CST
- Game weather: Sunny, 86 °F (30 °C), Wind: E 5mph
- Game attendance: 53,294
- Referee: Kevin Mar
- TV announcers (FOX): Gus Johnson, Joel Klatt, and Jenny Taft

Game information

First quarter

Second quarter

Third quarter

Fourth quarter

Statistics	Colorado	TCU
First downs	30	27
Plays–yards	81–565	79–541
Rushes–yards	55	262
Passing yards	510	279
Passing: comp–att–int	38–47–0	24–42–2
Turnovers		
Time of possession	34:33	25:27

Team	Category	Player	Statistics
Colorado	Passing	Shedeur Sanders	38/47, 510 yards, 4 TD
Colorado	Rushing	Sy'veon Wilkerson	13 carries, 45 yards, 1 TD
Colorado	Receiving	Dylan Edwards	5 receptions, 135 yards, 3 TD
TCU	Passing	Chandler Morris	24/42, 279 yards, 2 TD, 2 INT
TCU	Rushing	Emani Bailey	14 carries, 164 yards
TCU	Receiving	Jared Wiley	6 receptions, 69 yards, 1 TD

=== vs Nicholls ===
Nicholls Colonels (0-1) vs TCU Horned Frogs (0-1) – Game summary

Quarter	1	2	3	4	Total
Colonels	0	3	3	0	6
Horned Frogs	14	10	0	17	41

at Amon G. Carter Stadium • Fort Worth, Texas

- Date: September 9th
- Game time: 7:00 p.m. CST
- Game weather: Sunny, 94 °F (34 °C), Wind: NE 12mph
- Game attendance: 45,010
- Referee: Luke Richmond
- TV announcers (ESPN+): Ted Emrich, Taylor McHargue

Game information

First quarter

Second quarter

Third quarter

Fourth quarter

Statistics	Nicholls	TCU
First downs	15	22
Plays–yards	75–263	70–442
Rushes–yards	86	129
Passing yards	177	313
Passing: comp–att–int	17–36–1	28–33–1
Turnovers		
Time of possession	35:26	24:34

Team	Category	Player	Statistics
Nicholls	Passing	Pat McQuaide	17/36, 177 yards, 1 INT
Nicholls	Rushing	Collin Guggenheim	14 carries, 38 yards
Nicholls	Receiving	Neno Lemay	8 receptions, 100 yards
TCU	Passing	Chandler Morris	26/30, 263 yards, 2 TD
TCU	Rushing	Emani Bailey	19 carries, 67 yards
TCU	Receiving	Warren Thompson	8 receptions, 92 yards

=== at Houston ===
	1	2	3	4	Total
Horned Frogs	7	13	9	7	36
Cougars	3	10	0	0	13

=== vs SMU ===
SMU Mustangs (2–1) at TCU Horned Frogs (2–1) – Game summary

Quarter	1	2	3	4	Total
Mustangs	3	7	0	7	17
Horned Frogs	7	7	13	7	34

at Amon G. Carter Stadium, Fort Worth, Texas

- Date: September 23
- Game time: 11:00 a.m. CDT
- Game weather: Sunny, 89 °F (32 °C)
- Game attendance: 51,243
- Referee: Nate Black
- TV announcers (FS1): Eric Collins and Devin Gardner
- Box score, Recap

Game information
First quarter
- SMU – Collin Rogers 24-yard field goal, 8:43. Mustangs 3–0. Drive: 14 plays, 69 yards, 6:17.
- TCU – Jared Wiley 9-yard pass from Chandler Morris (Griffin Kell kick), 0:16. Horned Frogs 7–3. Drive: 10 plays, 46 yards, 3:01.

Second quarter

- TCU – Jared Wiley 2-yard pass from Chandler Morris (Griffin Kell kick), 6:58. Horned Frogs 14–3. Drive: 10 plays, 68 yards, 4:07.
- SMU – Camar Wheaton 1-yard run (Collin Rogers kick), 2:54. Horned Frogs 14–10. Drive: 9 plays, 75 yards, 4:04.

Third quarter

- TCU – Griffin Kell 35-yard field goal, 11:05. Horned Frogs 17–10. Drive: 12 plays, 58 yards, 3:55.
- TCU – Griffin Kell 24-yard field goal, 6:14. Horned Frogs 20–10. Drive: 11 plays, 54 yards, 4:17.
- TCU – Emani Bailey 24-yard run (Griffin Kell kick), 1:54. Horned Frogs 27–10. Drive: 5 plays, 64 yards, 1:33.

Fourth quarter

- SMU – Tyler Lavine 2-yard run (Collin Rogers kick), 1:47. Horned Frogs 27–17. Drive: 13 plays, 72 yards, 4:48.
- TCU – Chase Curtis 36-yard pass from Chandler Morris (Griffin Kell kick), 1:18. Horned Frogs 34–17. Drive: 4 plays, 44 yards, 0:29.

Statistics	SMU	TCU
First downs	21	25
Total yards	416	457
Rushing yards	158	192
Passing yards	258	265
Turnovers	2	0
Time of possession	30:12	29:48

Team	Category	Player	Statistics
SMU	Passing	Preston Stone	16/35, 258 yards, 2 INT
SMU	Rushing	Camar Wheaton	16 rushes, 73 yards, TD
SMU	Receiving	Jordan Kerley	1 reception, 51 yards
TCU	Passing	Chandler Morris	23/32, 261 yards, 3 TD
TCU	Rushing	Emani Bailey	25 rushes, 126 yards, TD
TCU	Receiving	Chase Curtis	2 receptions, 55 yards, TD

Prior to the start of the 2023 season, TCU announced it was indefinitely suspending the Battle for the Iron Skillet after the 2025 season. TCU defeated SMU 34–17.

=== at Iowa State ===
TCU Horned Frogs (3–2) vs. Iowa State Cyclones (2–3)

Quarter	1	2	3	4	Total
TCU	0	7	0	7	14
Iowa State	7	3	14	3	27

at Jack Trice Stadium • Ames, IA

- Date: Saturday, October 7, 2023
- Game time: 7:00 p.m. CDT
- Game weather: cloudy, W 3 MPH • Temperature: 58°F
- Game attendance: 60,535
- Referee: Kevin Mar
- TV announcers (FS1): Alex Faust, Petros Papadakis

Game information

First Quarter

- (0:23) ISU - Sanders, Eli 4 yd run (Contreraz, Chase kick) (Drive: 5 plays, 49 yards, 2:13; ISU 7–0)

Second Quarter

- (10:28) TCU - Williams, Savion 6 yd pass from Morris, Chandler (Kell, Griffin kick) (Drive: 11 plays, 78 yards, 4:47; Tied 7–7)
- (0:00) ISU - Contreraz, Chase 26 yd field goal (Drive: 4 plays, 3 yards, 0:44; ISU 10–7)

Third Quarter

- (11:30) ISU - ISU - Sama, Abu 55 yd run (Contreraz, Chase kick) (Drive: 2 plays, 74 yards, 0:35; ISU 17–7)
- (3:27) ISU - Dean, Easton 1 yd pass from Becht, Rocco (Contreraz, Chase kick) (Drive: 11 plays, 38 yards, 5:29; ISU 24–7)

Fourth Quarter

- (11:27) ISU - Contreraz, Chase 21 yd field goal (Drive: 8 plays, 72 yards, 4:56; ISU 27–7)
- (1:17) TCU - Nowell, Blake 9 yd pass from Hoover, Josh (Kell, Griffin kick) (Drive: 6 plays, 43 yards, 0:58; ISU 27–14)

Statistics	TCU	ISU
First downs	23	16
Total yards	398	353
Rushes/yards	37/185	37/215
Passing yards	213	138
Passing: Comp–Att–Int	21–36–4	16–28–0
Turnovers	4	0
Time of possession	27:42	32:18

Team	Category	Player	Statistics
TCU	Passing	Josh Hoover	11–19, 119 YDS, TD, INT
TCU	Rushing	Emani Bailey	21 CAR, 152 YDS
TCU	Receiving	Warren Thompson	2 REC, 35 YDS
Iowa State	Passing	Rocco Becht	16–28, 138 yards, TD
Iowa State	Rushing	Eli Sanders	16 CAR, 99 YDS, TD
Iowa State	Receiving	Jaylin Noel	7 REC, 34 YDS

=== vs BYU ===
BYU at TCU

Team	1	2	3	4	Total
Cougars	0	8	3	0	11
• Horned Frogs	14	17	10	3	44

- Date: October 14
- Location: Amon G. Carter Stadium
  Ft. Worth, TX
- Game start: 2:35 p.m. CDT
- Elapsed time: 3:27
- Game attendance: 44,599
- Game weather: 68 °F (20 °C), Winds NW 16 mph
- Referee: Henry Johns
- TV announcers (ESPN): Dave Flemming, Brock Osweiler, and Kayla Burton

Scoring summary

Quarter	Time	Drive			Team	Scoring information	Score	
Quarter	Time	Plays	Yards	TOP	Team	Scoring information	BYU	TCU
"TOP" = time of possession. For other American football terms, see Glossary of American football.								

Statistics	BYU	TCU
First downs	15	30
Plays–yards	66–243	86–584
Rushes–yards	32–91	27–137
Passing yards	152	447
Passing: comp–att–int	15–34–1	38–59–2, 4 TD's
Turnovers		
Time of possession	29:22	30:38

Team	Category	Player	Statistics
BYU	Passing	Kedon Slovis	15–34–1, 152 yards
BYU	Rushing	LJ Martin	14 carries, 56 yards
BYU	Receiving	Chase Roberts	3 receptions, 63 yards
TCU	Passing	Josh Hoover	37–58–2, 439 yards, 4 TD's
TCU	Rushing	Emani Bailey	13 carries, 61 yards
TCU	Receiving	JP Richardson	6 receptions, 104 yards, 1 TD

=== at Texas Tech ===
TCU Horned Frogs at Texas Tech Red Raiders – Game summary

Quarter	1	2	3	4	Total
Horned Frogs	7	0	14	7	28
Red Raiders	7	13	8	7	35

at Jones AT&T Stadium, Lubbock, Texas

- Date: November 2
- Game time: 6:00 p.m. CDT
- Game weather: Sunny, 64 °F (18 °C)
- Game attendance: 51,185
- Referee: Michael VanderVelde
- TV announcers (FS1): Jeff Levering and Mark Helfrich
- Box score, Recap

Game information

First quarter

- TTU – Behren Morton 9-yard run (Gino Garcia kick), 6:12. Red Raiders 7–0. Drive: 14 plays, 81 yards, 5:43.
- TCU – D. J. Rogers 17-yard pass from Josh Hoover (Griffin Kell kick), 4:13. Tied 7–7. Drive: 7 plays, 75 yards, 1:59.

Second quarter

- TTU – Gino Garcia 27-yard field goal, 12:32. Red Raiders 10–7. Drive: 14 plays, 66 yards, 6:41.
- TTU – Myles Price 25-yard pass from Behren Morton (Gino Garcia kick), 3:46. Red Raiders 17–7. Drive: 12 plays, 75 yards, 5:35.
- TTU – Gino Garcia 55-yard field goal, 0:53. Red Raiders 20–7. Drive: 5 plays, 22 yards, 1:19.

Third quarter

- TCU – Emani Bailey 16-yard run (Griffin Kell kick), 8:08. Red Raiders 20–14. Drive: 10 plays, 93 yards, 3:51.
- TCU – Emani Bailey 2-yard run (Griffin Kell kick), 4:47. Horned Frogs 21–20. Drive: 5 plays, 34 yards, 1:50.
- TTU – Tahj Brooks 9-yard run (Behren Morton pass to Jerand Bradley), 0:06. Red Raiders 28–21. Drive: 2 plays, 16 yards, 0:34.

Fourth quarter

- TTU – Drae McCray 44-yard pass from Behren Morton (Gino Garcia kick), 10:33. Red Raiders 35–21. Drive: 3 plays, 92 yards, 1:13.
- TCU – Trey Sanders 1-yard run (Griffin Kell kick), 4:54. Red Raiders 35–28. Drive: 16 plays, 75 yards, 5:39.

Top passers

- TCU – Josh Hoover – 32/52, 353 yards, TD, 2 INT
- TTU – Behren Morton – 28/36, 282 yards, 2 TD

Top rushers

- TCU – Emani Bailey – 19 rushes, 57 yards, 2 TD
- TTU – Tahj Brooks – 31 rushes, 146 yards, TD

Top receivers

- TCU – Jaylon Robinson – 5 receptions, 68 yards
- TTU – Coy Eakin – 8 receptions, 78 yards

A possum ran onto the field early in the second quarter, quickly becoming a viral sensation and spawning numerous Internet memes. The animal was captured by stadium officials and was petted by Texas Tech president Lawrence Schovanec after the game before being released back into the wild.

=== vs No. 7 Texas ===
TCU–Texas football rivalry

Team	1	2	3	4	Total
• No. 7 Texas	7	19	0	3	29
TCU	6	0	0	20	26

- Date: November 11, 2023
- Location: Amon G. Carter Stadium (Fort Worth, TX)
- Game start: 6:44 p.m. CST
- Game attendance: 50,812
- Game weather: Cloudy, 61 °F (16 °C), wind E at 6 mph (9.7 km/h)
- Referee: Tutashinda Salaam
- TV announcers (ABC): Dave Pasch, Dusty Dvoracek, and Tom Luginbill

50,812 is the 3rd highest attendance for a game at Amon G. Carter Stadium to date.

Statistics	Texas	TCU
First downs	22	22
Plays–yards	74–482	64–390
Rushes–yards	41–165	28–88
Passing yards	317	302
Passing: comp–att–int	22–33–1	24–36–1
Turnovers		
Time of possession	34:18	25:42

Team	Category	Player	Statistics
Texas	Passing	Quinn Ewers	22–33, 317 yards, 1 TD, 1 INT
Texas	Rushing	Jonathon Brooks	21 carries, 104 yards, 2 TD
Texas	Receiving	Xavier Worthy	10 receptions, 137 yards
TCU	Passing	Josh Hoover	24–36, 302 yards, 2 TD, 1 INT
TCU	Rushing	Emani Bailey	21 carries, 98 yards, 1 TD
TCU	Receiving	Savion Williams	11 receptions, 164 yards, 1 TD

Scoring summary

Quarter	Time	Drive			Team	Scoring information	Score	
Quarter	Time	Plays	Yards	TOP	Team	Scoring information	Texas	TCU
1st	07:41	7	29	02:42	TCU	41-yard field goal by Griffin Kell	0	3
1st	06:53	2	75	00:48	Texas	Jonathon Brooks 2-yard touchdown run, Bert Auburn kick good	7	3
1st	04:35	5	37	02:18	TCU	56-yard field goal by Griffin Kell	7	6
2nd	14:50	6	52	02:32	Texas	30-yard field goal by Bert Auburn	10	6
2nd	08:32	9	43	05:03	Texas	32-yard field goal by Bert Auburn	13	6
2nd	01:01	13	85	04:54	Texas	Adonai Mitchell 6-yard touchdown reception from Quinn Ewers, 2-point pass failed	19	6
2nd	00:12	5	43	00:39	Texas	Jonathon Brooks 22-yard touchdown run, Bert Auburn kick good	26	6
4th	14:02	6	74	02:00	TCU	Emani Bailey 17-yard touchdown run, Griffin Kell kick good	26	13
4th	08:53	10	44	05:09	Texas	49-yard field goal by Bert Auburn	29	13
4th	05:51	9	75	03:02	TCU	JP Richardson 3-yard touchdown reception from Josh Hoover, 2-point pass failed	29	19
4th	03:28	3	36	00:35	TCU	Savion Williams 17-yard touchdown reception from Josh Hoover, Griffin Kell kick good	29	26
"TOP" = time of possession. For other American football terms, see Glossary of American football.							29	26

=== at Oklahoma ===
TCU Horned Frogs (5–6) vs. No. 13 Oklahoma Sooners (9–2)

Quarter	1	2	3	4	Total
TCU	13	3	22	7	45
No. 13 Oklahoma	14	27	10	17	68

at Gaylord Family Oklahoma Memorial Stadium • Norman, OK

- Date: Friday, November 25, 2023
- Game time: 11:00 a.m. CST
- Game weather: • Sunny Temperature: 46
- Game attendance: 83,669
- Referee: David Alvarez
- TV announcers (FOX): Tim Brando (play-by-play), Spencer Tillman (analyst) & Josh Sims (sideline)

Game information

First quarter

- (11:33) OKLA – Dillon Gabriel 8 yard rush, Zach Schmit kick (Drive: 2 plays, 73 yards, 0:38; OKLA 7–0)
- (8:53) TCU – Josh Hoover 3 yard rush (Drive: 4 plays, 19 yards, 1:11; OKLA 7–6)
- (7:42) OKLA – Jayden Gibson 59 yard pass from Dillon Gabriel, Zach Schmit kick (Drive: 4 plays, 75 yards, 1:11; OKLA 14–6)
- (4:30) TCU – JoJo Earle 6 yard pass from Josh Hoover, Griffin Kell kick (Drive: 8 plays, 75 yards, 3:12: OKLA 14–13)

Second quarter

- (14:33) OKLA – Brenen Thompson 53 yard pass from Dillon Gabriel, Zach Schmit kick (Drive: 7 plays, 80 yards, 1:55; OKLA 21–13)
- (10:13) OKLA – Gavin Sawchuk 12 yard rush, Zach Schmit kick (Drive: 10 plays, 72 yards, 2:51; OKLA 28–13)
- (6:15) OKLA – Gavin Sawchuk 7 yard rush, Zach Schmit kick (Drive: 7 plays, 33 yards, 2:09; OKLA 35–13)
- (3:18) OKLA – Tawee Walker 9 yard rush, Zach Schmit kick (Drive: 6 plays, 78 yards, 2:11; OKLA 42–13)
- (0:00) TCU – Griffin Kell 23 yard field goal (Drive: 15 plays, 80 yards, 3:17; OKLA 42–16)

Third quarter

- (9:51) OKLA – Zach Schmit 23 yard field goal (Drive: 13 plays, 70 yards, 5:09; OKLA 45–16)
- (7:51) TCU – Emani Bailey 32 yard rush, Griffin Kell kick (Drive: 6 plays, 78 yards, 1:54; OKLA 45–23)
- (5:14) TCU – Jared Wiley 3 yard pass from Josh Hoover, 2 point conversion from Jared Wiley (Drive: 9 plays, 74 yards, 2:29; OKLA 45–31)
- (2:46) OKLA – Drake Stoops 9 yard pass from Dillon Gabriel, Zach Schmit kick (Drive: 6 plays, 75 yards, 2:28; OKLA 52–31)
- (0:39) TCU – Emani Bailey 12 yard pass from Josh Hoover, Griffin Kell kick (Drive: 6 pays, 76 yards, 1:57; OKLA 52–38)

Fourth quarter

- (10:14) OKLA – Zach Schmit 40 yard field goal (Drive: 12 plays, 53 yards, 5:25; OKLA 55–38)
- (6:30) OKLA – Gavin Sawchuk 9 yard rush, Zach Schmit kick (Drive: 5 plays, 30 yards, 2:02; OKLA 62–38)
- (6:12) OKLA – Billy Bowman 45 yard interception, Zach Schmit kick (Drive: 1 play, 45 yards, 0:18; OKLA 69–38)
- (2:22) OKLA – Jared Willey 5 yard pass from Josh Hoover, Griffin Kell kick (Drive: 6 plays, 56 yards, 3:40; OKLA 69–45)

Statistics	TCU	OKLA
First downs	25	30
Total yards	520	607
Rushes/yards	29/176	41/207
Passing yards	344	400
Passing: Comp–Att–Int	32–58–1	24–38–1
Time of possession	30:22	29:38

Team	Category	Player	Statistics
TCU	Passing	Josh Hoover	32/58, 344 yards, 4 TD, 1 INT
TCU	Rushing	Emani Bailey	21 carries, 150 yards, 1 TD
TCU	Receiving	Jared Wiley	8 receptions, 39 yards, 2 TD
Oklahoma	Passing	Dillon Gabriel	24/38, 400 yards, 3 TD, 1 INT
Oklahoma	Rushing	Gavin Sawchuk	22 carries, 130 yards, 3 TD
Oklahoma	Receiving	Drake Stoops	12 receptions, 125 yards, 1 TD
