= 2023 Oklahoma State Cowboys football team =

American college football season

2023 Oklahoma State Cowboys football

Texas Bowl champion

Big 12 Championship, L 21–49 vs. Texas

Texas Bowl, W 31–23 vs. Texas A&M
- Conference: Big 12 Conference

Ranking
- Coaches: No. 16
- AP: No. 16
- Record: 10–4 (7–2 Big 12)
- Head coach: Mike Gundy (19th season)
- Offensive coordinator: Kasey Dunn (4th season)
- Offensive scheme: Spread option
- Defensive coordinator: Bryan Nardo (1st season)
- Co-defensive coordinator: Joe Bob Clements (1st season)
- Base defense: 3–3–5
- Home stadium: Boone Pickens Stadium

2023 Big 12 Conference football standings
	Conf.			Overall
Team	W		L	W		L
No. 3 Texas y$^	8	–	1	12	–	2
No. 16 Oklahoma State y	7	–	2	10	–	4
No. 15 Oklahoma	7	–	2	10	–	3
Iowa State	6	–	3	7	–	6
No. 18 Kansas State	6	–	3	9	–	4
West Virginia	6	–	3	9	–	4
Texas Tech	5	–	4	7	–	6
No. 23 Kansas	5	–	4	9	–	4
UCF	3	–	6	6	–	7
TCU	3	–	6	5	–	7
Houston	2	–	7	4	–	8
BYU	2	–	7	5	–	7
Baylor	2	–	7	3	–	9
Cincinnati	1	–	8	3	–	9
Championship: Texas 49, Oklahoma State 21
^ – College Football Playoff participant; $ – Conference champion; y – Championship game participant; Rankings from AP Poll

The 2023 Oklahoma State Cowboys football team represented Oklahoma State University as a member of the Big 12 Conference during the 2023 NCAA Division I FBS football season. They were led by Mike Gundy in his 19th year as their head coach. The Cowboys played their home games at Boone Pickens Stadium in Stillwater, Oklahoma.

== Preseason ==
=== Big 12 media poll ===
Predicted finish	Team	Votes (1st place)
1	Texas (41)	886
2	Kansas State (14)	858
3	Oklahoma (4)	758
4	Texas Tech (4)	729
5	TCU (3)	727
6	Baylor	572
7	Oklahoma State (1)	470
8	UCF	463
9	Kansas	461
10	Iowa State	334
11	BYU	318
12	Houston	215
13	Cincinnati	202
14	West Virginia	129

== Schedule ==
Date	Time	Opponent	Rank	Site	TV	Result	Attendance
September 2	6:00 p.m.	Central Arkansas*		Boone Pickens Stadium; Stillwater, OK	ESPN+	W 27–13	53,855
September 9	9:30 p.m.	at Arizona State*		Mountain America Stadium; Tempe, AZ	FS1	W 27–15	42,569
September 16	6:00 p.m.	South Alabama*	No. 23	Boone Pickens Stadium; Stillwater, OK	ESPN+	L 7–33	53,855
September 23	3:00 p.m.	at Iowa State		Jack Trice Stadium; Ames, IA	FS1	L 27–34	59,022
October 6	6:30 p.m.	Kansas State		Boone Pickens Stadium; Stillwater, OK	ESPN	W 29–21	53,855
October 14	2:30 p.m.	No. 23 Kansas		Boone Pickens Stadium; Stillwater, OK	FS1	W 39–32	53,855
October 21	2:30 p.m.	at West Virginia		Milan Puskar Stadium; Morgantown, WV	ESPN	W 48–34	51,870
October 28	7:00 p.m.	Cincinnati^{†}		Boone Pickens Stadium; Stillwater, OK	ESPN2	W 45–13	53,855
November 4	2:30 p.m.	No. 9 Oklahoma	No. 22	Boone Pickens Stadium; Stillwater, OK (Bedlam Series)	ABC	W 27–24	54,105
November 11	2:30 p.m.	at UCF	No. 15	FBC Mortgage Stadium; Orlando, FL	ESPN	L 3–45	44,046
November 18	3:00 p.m.	at Houston	No. 23	TDECU Stadium; Houston, TX	ESPN2	W 43–30	33,906
November 25	2:30 p.m.	BYU	No. 20	Boone Pickens Stadium; Stillwater, OK	ABC	W 40–34 ^{2OT}	53,855
December 2	11:00 a.m.	vs. No. 7 Texas	No. 18	AT&T Stadium; Arlington, TX (Big 12 Championship Game)	ABC	L 21–49	84,523
December 27	8:00 p.m.	vs. Texas A&M	No. 20	NRG Stadium; Houston, TX (Texas Bowl)	ESPN	W 31–23	55,212
*Non-conference game; ^{†}Homecoming; Rankings from AP Poll (and CFP Rankings, after October 31) - Released prior to game; All times are in Central time

== Personnel ==
2023 Oklahoma State Cowboys football team roster
Players
Coaches
Offense

Pos.	#	Name	Class
RB	0	Ollie Gordon II	So
WR	2	Tayln Shettron	Fr
RB	3	Jaden Nixon	So
WR	5	Jaden Bray	So
QB	6	Zane Flores	Fr
QB	7	Alan Bowman	Sr
WR	8	Blaine Green	So
WR	10	Rashod Owens	Jr
TE	11	Tabry Shettron	Fr
QB	12	Gunnar Gundy	So
QB	13	Garret Rangel	Fr
QB	14	Peyton Thompson	Sr
TE	16	Josiah Johnson	Sr
WR	17	Leon Johnson III	Sr
RB	20	Sesi Vailahi	Fr
WR	23	Jalen Pope	Fr
RB	24	Elijah Collins	Sr
RB	25	Hudson Devins	Fr
WR	31	Jaxon Deason	Fr
WR	36	Ty Walls	Fr
WR	37	Seth Swircyznski	Fr
FB	38	Jake Schultz	Sr
FB	47	Luke McEndoo	So
TE	48	Bryce Drummond	So
OL	51	Austin Kawecki	Fr
OL	52	Garrett Keith	Fr
OL	54	Jude Ropp	Fr
OL	58	Vilami Makahununiu	Fr
OL	61	Jake Springfield	Sr
OL	62	Jamison Mejia	Fr
OL	64	Jarrett Henry	So
OL	65	Hilton Marsh	So
OL	66	Joe Michalski	Sr
OL	67	Cole Birmingham	Sr
OL	68	Taylor Miterko	Sr
OL	69	Evan Bax	Fr
OL	70	Jack Endean	Fr
OL	71	Dalton Cooper	Sr
OL	72	Calvin Harvey	Fr
OL	73	Jason Brooks Jr.	Jr
OL	74	Preston Wilson	Sr
OL	75	Jakobe Sanders	Fr
OL	77	Noah McKinney	Fr
OL	78	Davis Dotson	Fr
OL	79	Gage Stanaland	Fr
WR	80	Brennan Presley	Sr
WR	81	Camron Heard	Fr
TE	82	Quinton Stewart	Jr
WR	83	Cale Cabbiness	Jr
WR	84	Mason Gilkey	Fr
WR	85	Tykie Andrews	Fr
TE	86	Ian Edenfield	Sr
WR	87	Cason Cabbiness	Fr
WR	88	De'Zhaun Stribling	Jr
FB	90	Braden Cassity	Sr

Defense

Pos.	#	Name	Class
S	0	Lardarius Webb Jr.	Jr
LB	1	Xavier Benson	Sr
CB	2	Korie Black	Sr
CB	3	Cam Smith	So
LB	4	Nickolas Martin	So
S	5	Kendal Daniels	So
S	6	Lyrik Rawls	So
S	7	Cameron Epps	Fr
CB	8	D. J. McKinney	Fr
S	9	Trey Rucker	Sr
CB	10	Kale Smith	So
CB	11	Dylan Smith	Fr
S	12	Kam Franklin	Fr
CB	13	RJ Lester	Fr
S	14	Nick Session	Jr
S	15	Ty Williams	So
S	17	Tywon Wray Jr.	Fr
S	19	Gabriel Rodriguez	Fr
CB	20	DeSean Buckner	Jr
LB	22	Jeff Roberson	Jr
CB	23	Kenneth Harris	Sr
CB	24	De'Kelvion Beamon	So
LB	25	Ike Esonwune	Fr
CB	26	Jordan Reagan	Jr
S	27	Raymond Gay II	So
S	28	Eli Williams	Fr
S	29	Cooper Lai	Fr
LB	30	Collin Oliver	Jr
LB	31	Chance Clements	Fr
LB	32	Gabe Brown	Fr
LB	33	Donovan Stephens	So
LB	35	Poasa Utu	Fr
DE	37	Isreal Isuman-Hundley	Sr
S	38	Kade Welcher	So
S	39	Parker Robertson	So
S	40	Garrick Martin	Jr
LB	41	Constantino Borrelli	Jr
LB	42	Grant Mirabal	Fr
LB	44	Justin Wright	Sr
LB	45	Justin Crutchmer	Fr
DE	47	Patrick Ojo	Fr
LB	48	Elijah Wright	Jr
LB	51	Bo Hardy	Jr
LB	53	Andrew McCall	Fr
NT	54	Marcus Duckworth	Jr
DE	56	Xavier Ross	Sr
DE	57	Ryan Baker	Jr
NT	67	Jaelen Tucker	Fr
NT	70	Jed Wagner	So
NT	71	Aden Kelley	So
DE	87	DeSean Brown	Fr
DE	88	Landon Dean	Fr
NT	90	A. J. Ridener	Fr
DE	91	Jaedon Foreman-Felix	Fr
DE	92	Nathan Latu	Sr
NT	93	Colin Clay	Sr
DE	94	Anthony Goodlow	Sr
DE	95	Jaleel Johnson	Fr
DE	96	Koby Walterscheid	Sr
NT	97	Justin Kirkland	So
NT	99	Iman Oates	Jr

Special teams

Pos.	#	Name	Class
K	19	Alex Hale	Sr
P	29	Hudson Kaak	Fr
LS	44	Shea Freibaum	Fr
K	49	Thomas Murray	Fr
LS	57	Osker Ehrlich	Fr
K	59	Kason Shrum	Jr
LS	63	Zeke Zaragoza	Sr
K	69	Logan Ward	So
P	79	Wes Pahl	Jr

Head coach

- Mike Gundy

Coordinators/assistant coaches

- Joe Bob Clements – Co-defensive coordinator/linebackers
- Charlie Dickey – Offensive line
- Tim Duffie – Defensive passing game coordinator/cornerbacks
- Kasey Dunn – Associate head coach/offensive coordinator/wide receivers
- Dan Hammerschmidt – Safeties
- Jason McEndoo – Tight ends/Cowboy Backs
- Bryan Nardo – Defensive coordinator
- Tim Rattay – Quarterbacks
- Greg Richmond – Defensive line
- John Wozniak – Running backs
- Rob Glass – Strength and conditioning
- Tim Sanders – Offensive analyst
- Bradley Thomas – Offensive analyst
- Chris Thurmond – Offensive analyst
- Gary Gibbs – Defensive analyst
- Joseph Foteh – Special teams analyst
- Rod Johnson – Director, football operations
- Jon Pickle – Assistant director of football operations
- Todd Bradford – Director, football recruiting
- Mariah Turner – Director, on-campus recruiting
- Josh Gonzales – Assistant recruiting director, offense
- Richetti Jones – Director, player development
- Beni Tonga – Player development specialist
- Eddie Simpkins – Administrative assistant/prospect analyst – QB
- Zach Allen – Prospect analyst – OL
- Justin Gordon – Prospect analyst – LB
- D. J. Linton – Prospect analyst – DL
- Cameron O'Neal – Prospect analyst – DB
- Lorenzo Joe – Prospect analyst – RB
- J. W. Walsh – Offensive quality control
- Bryce Lewis – Defensive quality control
- Travis Britz – Graduate assistant

Legend

- (C) Team captain
- (S) Suspended
- (I) Ineligible
- Injured
- Redshirt

Roster

== Game summaries ==
=== Central Arkansas ===
Central Arkansas Bears at Oklahoma State Cowboys – Game summary

Quarter	1	2	3	4	Total
Bears	0	0	7	6	13
Cowboys	7	6	0	14	27

at Boone Pickens Stadium, Stillwater, Oklahoma

- Date: September 2
- Game time: 6:00 p.m. CDT
- Game weather: Sunny, 92 °F (33 °C)
- Game attendance: 53,855
- Referee: Michael VanderVelde
- TV announcers (ESPN+): Matt Schumacker (play-by-play) & Brad Hopkins (analyst)

Game information

First quarter

- OKST – Brennan Presley 11-yard pass from Garrett Rangel (Alex Hale kick), 2:58. Cowboys 7–0. Drive: 9 plays, 80 yards, 2:47.

Second quarter

- OKST – Alex Hale 36-yard field goal, 5:34. Cowboys 10–0. Drive: 11 plays, 31 yards, 3:59.
- OKST – Alex Hale 45-yard field goal, 0:00. Cowboys 13–0. Drive: 4 plays, 0 yards, 0:20.

Third quarter

- UCA – Kylin James 1-yard pass from Will McElvain (Jake Gaster kick), 4:37. Cowboys 13–7. Drive: 8 plays, 95 yards, 3:39.

Fourth quarter

- OKST – Elijah Collins 17-yard run (Alex Hale kick), 10:44. Cowboys 20–7. Drive: 9 plays, 93 yards, 3:57.
- OKST – Ollie Gordon II 2-yard run (Alex Hale kick), 5:54. Cowboys 27–7. Drive: 6 plays, 78 yards, 2:41.
- UCA – Christian Richmond 2-yard pass from Will McElvain (kick failed), 3:28. Cowboys 27–13. Drive: 7 plays, 70 yards, 2:26.

Statistics	UCA	OKST
First downs	19	24
Total yards	391	453
Rushes/yards	28/123	31/149
Passing yards	268	304
Passing: Comp–Att–Int	24–37	30–48–1
Time of possession	27:30	30:35

Team	Category	Player	Statistics
Central Arkansas	Passing	Will McElvain	24/37, 268 yards, 2 TD
Central Arkansas	Rushing	ShunDerrick Powell	12 carries, 71 yards
Central Arkansas	Receiving	Christian Richmond	5 receptions, 38 yards, TD
Oklahoma State	Passing	Garret Rangel	10/15, 118 yards, TD, INT
Oklahoma State	Rushing	Ollie Gordon II	7 carries, 44 yards, TD
Oklahoma State	Receiving	Brennan Presley	6 receptions, 54 yards, TD

=== At Arizona State ===
Oklahoma State Cowboys at Arizona State Sun Devils – Game summary

Quarter	1	2	3	4	Total
Cowboys	0	10	7	10	27
Sun Devils	7	8	0	0	15

at Mountain America Stadium, Tempe, Arizona

- Date: September 9
- Game time: 9:30 p.m. CDT/7:30 p.m. MST
- Game weather: Sunny, 104 °F (40 °C)
- Game attendance: 42,569
- Referee: Kevin Mar
- TV announcers (FS1): Alex Faust (play-by-play) & Petros Papadakis (analyst)

Game information

First quarter

- ASU – Cam Skattebo 13-yard run (Dario Longhetto kick), 4:28. Sun Devils 7–0. Drive: 11 plays, 77 yards, 5:18.

Second quarter

- OKST – Ollie Gordon II 2-yard run (Alex Hale kick), 11:58. Tied 7–7. Drive: 7 plays, 43 yards, 3:02.
- ASU – Elijhah Badger 65-yard pass from Jaden Rashada (Cam Skattebo run), 10:07. Sun Devils 15–7. Drive: 4 plays, 75 yards, 1:51.
- OKST – Alex Hale 52-yard field goal, 7:41. Sun Devils 15–10. Drive: 6 plays, 40 yards, 2:26.

Third quarter

- OKST – De'Zhaun Stribling 3-yard pass from Gunnar Gundy (Alex Hale kick), 9:09. Cowboys 17–15. Drive: 5 plays, 60 yards, 3:04.

Fourth quarter

- OKST – Alex Hale 22-yard field goal, 7:11. Cowboys 20–15. Drive: 10 plays, 52 yards, 5:28.
- OKST – Brennan Presley 16-yard pass from Garret Rangel (Alex Hale kick), 2:56. Cowboys 27–15. Drive: 6 plays, 33 yards, 3:07.

Statistics	OKST	ASU
First downs	16	15
Total yards	304	277
Rushes/yards	31/113	34/110
Passing yards	191	167
Passing: Comp–Att–Int	22–32	16–29–1
Time of possession	31:17	28:43

Team	Category	Player	Statistics
Oklahoma State	Passing	Alan Bowman	11/16, 113 yards
Oklahoma State	Rushing	Ollie Gordon II	9 rushes, 53 yards, TD
Oklahoma State	Receiving	De'Zhaun Stribling	7 receptions, 65 yards, TD
Arizona State	Passing	Jaden Rashada	16/29, 167 yards, TD, INT
Arizona State	Rushing	Cameron Skattebo	14 rushes, 62 yards, TD
Arizona State	Receiving	Elijhah Badger	3 receptions, 80 yards, TD

=== South Alabama ===
South Alabama Jaguars vs. Oklahoma State Cowboys – Game summary

Quarter	1	2	3	4	Total
Jaguars	10	13	0	10	33
Cowboys	0	0	0	7	7

at Boone Pickens Stadium • Stillwater, Oklahoma

- Date: Saturday, September 16, 2023
- Game time: 6:00 p.m. CDT
- Game weather: Cloudy, 78 °F (26 °C)
- Game attendance: 53,855
- Referee: Kyle Olson
- TV announcers (ESPN+): Drew Carter (play-by-play) & Dustin Fox (analyst)

Game information

First Quarter

- (6:18) USA – Diego Guajardo 39 yard field goal (Drive: 14 plays, 68 yards, 6:46; USA 3–0)
- (1:01) USA – Caullin Lacy 39 yard pass from Carter Bradley, Diego Guajardo kick (Drive: 8 plays, 70 yards, 4:18; USA 10–0)

Second Quarter

- (14:44) USA – La'Damian Webb 17 yard rush, XP Kick failed (Drive: 1 play, 17 yards, 0:06; USA 16–0)
- (01:03) USA – Caullin Lacy 57 yard pass from Carter Bradley, Diego Guajardo kick (Drive: 3 plays, 59 yards, 1:00; USA 23–0)

Third Quarter

- No Score

Fourth Quarter

- (12:14) OSU – Jaden Nixon 2 yard rush, Alex Hale kick (Drive: 17 plays, 84 yards, 6:09; USA 23–7)
- (9:04) USA – Diego Guajardo 42 yard field goal (Drive: 4 plays, 0 yards, 1:33; USA 26–7)
- (7:04) USA – La'Damian Webb 65 yard rush, Diego Guajardo kick (Drive: 2 plays, 67 yards, 0:52; USA 33–7)

Statistics	USA	OKST
First downs	18	14
Total yards	395	208
Rushes/yards	47/243	29/94
Passing yards	152	114
Passing: Comp–Att–Int	10–16	16–35–1
Time of possession	34:35	25:20

Team	Category	Player	Statistics
South Alabama	Passing	Carter Bradley	10/15, 152 yards, 2 TD's
South Alabama	Rushing	La'Damian Webb	18 carries, 151 yards, 2 TD's
South Alabama	Receiving	Caullin Lacy	5 receptions, 104 yards, 2 TD's
Oklahoma State	Passing	Gunnar Gundy	9/18, 64 yards
Oklahoma State	Rushing	Elijah Collins	9 carries, 31 yards
Oklahoma State	Receiving	Jaden Bray	5 receptions, 42 yards

=== At Iowa State ===
Oklahoma State Cowboys at Iowa State Cyclones – Game summary

Quarter	1	2	3	4	Total
Cowboys	7	10	3	7	27
Cyclones	7	13	7	7	34

at Jack Trice Stadium, Ames, Iowa

- Date: Saturday, September 23, 2023
- Game time: 3:00 p.m. CDT
- Game weather: • Cloudy Temperature: 79
- Game attendance: 59,022
- Referee: David Alvarez
- TV announcers (FS1): Dan Hellie (play-by-play) & Petros Papadakis (analyst)

Game information

First quarter

- (5:40) OSU – Alan Bowman 12 yard rush, Alex Hale kick (Drive: 2 plays, 83 yards, 0:55; OSU 7–0)
- (3:23) ISU – Jaylin Noel 38 yard pass from Rocco Becht, Chase Contreraz kick (Drive: 5 plays, 75 yards, 2:17; Tied 7–7)

Second quarter

- (12:55) ISU – Daniel Jackson 29 yard pass from Rocco Becht, Chase Contreaz kick (Drive: 3 plays, 62 yards, 1:09; ISU 14–7)
- (11:01) OSU – Jaden Nixon 60 yard pass from Alan Bowman, Alex Hale kick (Drive: 4 plays, 75 yards, 1:54; Tied 14–14)
- (7:12) ISU – Chase Contreaz 51 yard field goal (Drive: 9 plays, 42 yards, 3:49; ISU 17–14)
- (0:43) ISU – Chase Contreaz 46 yard field goal (Drive: 14 plays, 56 yards, 5:27; ISU 20–14)
- (0:00) OSU – Alex Hale 38 yard field goal (Drive: 7 plays, 44 yards, 0:43; ISU 20–17)

Third quarter

- (5:30) ISU – Daniel Jackson 26 yard pass from Rocco Becht, Chase Contreaz kick (Drive: 2 plays, 47 yards, 0:45; ISU 27–17)
- (2:54) OSU – Alex Hale 53 yard field goal (Drive: 7 plays, 40 yards, 2:36; ISU 27–20)

Fourth quarter

- (14:54) ISU – Eli Sanders 7 yard rush, Chase Contreaz kick (Drive: 6 plays, 75 yards, 3:00; ISU 34–20)
- (2:46) OSU – Rashod Owens 20 yard pass from Alan Bowman, Alex Hale kick (Drive: 11 plays, 65 yards, 3:48; ISU 34–27)

Statistics	OKST	ISU
First downs	18	20
Total yards	409	422
Rushes/yards	24/131	34/74
Passing yards	278	348
Passing: Comp–Att–Int	23–48–2	27–38
Time of possession	25:20	34:40

Team	Category	Player	Statistics
Oklahoma State	Passing	Alan Bowman	23/48, 278 yards, 2 TD, 2 INT
Oklahoma State	Rushing	Ollie Gordon II	18 carries, 121 yards
Oklahoma State	Receiving	Jaden Nixon	2 receptions, 60 yards, 1 TD
Iowa State	Passing	Rocco Becht	27/38, 348 yards, 3 TD
Iowa State	Rushing	Eli Sanders	15 carries, 58 yards, 1 TD
Iowa State	Receiving	Jaylin Noel	8 receptions, 146 yards, 1 TD

=== Kansas State ===
Kansas State Wildcats vs. Oklahoma State Cowboys – Game summary

Quarter	1	2	3	4	Total
Wildcats	0	7	8	6	21
Cowboys	10	10	6	3	29

at Boone Pickens Stadium • Stillwater, Oklahoma

- Date: Friday, October 6, 2023
- Game time: 6:30 p.m. CDT
- Game weather: • Temperature:
- Game attendance: 62,621
- TV announcers (ESPN): Anish Shroff (play-by-play), Andre Ware (analyst), and Paul Carcaterra (sideline)

Game information

First Quarter
Second Quarter
Third Quarter
Fourth Quarter

Statistics	KSU	OKST
First downs	18	20
Total yards	372	412
Rushing yards	220	174
Passing yards	152	238
Passing: Comp–Att–Int	15-32-3	20-36-0
Time of possession	25:18	34:42

Team	Category	Player	Statistics
Kansas State	Passing	Will Howard	15/34, 152 yards, TD, 3 INT
Kansas State	Rushing	Will Howard	10 carries, 104 yards, TD
Kansas State	Receiving	Phillip Brooks	3 receptions, 50 yards
Oklahoma State	Passing	Alan Bowman	19/35, 235 yards
Oklahoma State	Rushing	Ollie Gordon II	21 carries, 136 yards, TD
Oklahoma State	Receiving	Jaden Bray	4 receptions, 77 yards

=== No. 23 Kansas ===
No. 23 Kansas Jayhawks vs. Oklahoma State Cowboys – Game summary

Quarter	1	2	3	4	Total
No. 23 Jayhawks	7	18	7	0	32
Cowboys	17	7	3	12	39

at Boone Pickens Stadium • Stillwater, Oklahoma

- Date: Saturday, October 14, 2023
- Game time: 2:30 pm CDT
- Game weather: Sunny • Temperature: 62 °F (17 °C)
- Game attendance: 53,855
- Referee: Kevin Mar
- TV announcers (FS1): Jeff Levering, Mark Helfrich

Game information

First quarter

- 13:11 OKST Alan Bowman 17 yard pass to Ollie Gordon II (Alex Hale kick good) 5–77, 1:45 OSU 7–0
- 7:25 OKST Alan Bowman 20 yard pass to Brennan Presley (Alex Hale kick good) 9–83, 3:00 OSU 14–0
- 5:14 KU Jason Bean 47 yard pass to Trevor Wilson (Seth Keller kick good) 5—75, 2:11 OSU 14–6

Second quarter

- 12:42 KU Jason Bean 30 yard pass to Mason Fairchild (Seth Keller kick blocked) 9–75, 4:28 OSU 14–13
- 10:41 KU Jason Bean 44 yard pass to Mason Fairchild (Grayden Addison run failed) 2–72, 0:44 KU 19–14
- 2:52 OKST Ollie Gordon II 42 yard run (Alex Hale kick good) 2–53 0:48, OSU 21–19
- 2:10 OKST Alex Hale 28 yard field goal 8–64, 3;04 OSU 24–19
- 1:06 KU Jason Bean 49 pass to Quentin Skinner (Jason Bean pass no good) 5–75, 1:46 KU 25–24

Third quarter

- 11:13 KU Jason Bean 42 yard pass to Quentin Skinner (Owen Piepergerdes kick good) 8–75, 3:42 KU 32–24
- 5:28 OKST Alex Hale 26 yard field goal 13–66, 5:28 KU 32–27

Fourth quarter

- 11:32 OKST Alex Hale 21 yard field goal 10–74, 4:52 KU 32–30
- 2:33 OKST Brennan Presley 6 yard run (Alan Bowman pass failed) 9–50, 3:50 OSU 36–32
- 0:15 OKST Alex Hale 46 yard field goal 4–9, 1:42 OSU 39–32

Statistics	KU	OKST
First downs	19	27
Total yards	500	554
Rushes/yards	29/90	38/219
Passing/yards	410	336
Passing: Comp–Att–Int	23-34-2	28-41
Time of possession	28:29	31:31

Team	Category	Player	Statistics
Kansas	Passing	Jason Bean	23/34, 410 yards, 5 TD, 2 INT
Kansas	Rushing	Devin Neal	13 carries, 66 yards
Kansas	Receiving	Mason Fairchild	5 receptions, 92 yards, 2 TD
Oklahoma State	Passing	Alan Bowman	28/41, 336 yards, 2 TD
Oklahoma State	Rushing	Ollie Gordon II	29 carries, 168 yards, 1 TD
Oklahoma State	Receiving	Ollie Gordon II	6 receptions, 116 yards, 1 TD

=== At West Virginia ===
Oklahoma State Cowboys at West Virginia Mountaineers – Game summary

Quarter	1	2	3	4	Total
Cowboys	10	3	7	28	48
Mountaineers	0	7	17	10	34

at Milan Puskar Stadium, Morgantown, West Virginia

- Date: Saturday, October 21, 2023
- Game time: 2:30 pm CDT
- Game weather: Cloudy • Temperature: 55°F
- Game attendance: 51,870
- Referee: David Alvarez
- TV announcers (ESPN): Mike Monaco (play-by-play) & Robert Griffin III (analyst)

Game information

First quarter
Second quarter
Third quarter
Fourth quarter

Statistics	OKST	WVU
First downs	21	24
Total yards	491	475
Rushing yards	281	226
Passing yards	210	249
Passing: Comp–Att–Int	24-36-1	15-30-1
Time of possession	27:24	32:36

Team	Category	Player	Statistics
Oklahoma State	Passing	Alan Bowman	24/36, 210 yards, 2 TD, 1 INT
Oklahoma State	Rushing	Ollie Gordon	29 carries, 282 yards, 4 TD
Oklahoma State	Receiving	Brennan Presley	9 receptions, 62 yards, 1 TD
West Virginia	Passing	Garrett Greene	15/30, 249 yards, 2 TD, 1 INT
West Virginia	Rushing	Garrett Greene	16 carries, 126 yards
West Virginia	Receiving	Preston Fox	4 receptions, 81 yards

=== Cincinnati ===
Cincinnati Bearcats at Oklahoma State Cowboys – Game summary

Quarter	1	2	3	4	Total
Bearcats	7	0	0	6	13
Cowboys	7	3	21	14	45

at Boone Pickens Stadium • Stillwater, Oklahoma

- Date: Saturday, October 28, 2023
- Game time: 7:00 pm CDT
- Game weather: Cloudy • Temperature: 42 °F (6 °C) • Wind: N 11 MPH
- Game attendance: 53,855
- Referee: Tutashinda Salaam
- TV: ESPN2

Game information

First quarter
Second quarter
Third quarter
Fourth quarter

Statistics	CIN	OKST
First downs	20	23
Total yards	442	601
Rushing yards	277	315
Passing yards	165	286
Passing: Comp–Att–Int	11-25-1	17-34-1
Time of possession	30:33	29:27

Team	Category	Player	Statistics
Cincinnati	Passing	Emory Jones	6/16, 117 yards, INT
Cincinnati	Rushing	Myles Montgomery	8 carries, 90 yards, TD
Cincinnati	Receiving	Xzavier Henderson	4 receptions, 82 yards
Oklahoma State	Passing	Alan Bowman	17/34, 286 yards, 2 TD, INT
Oklahoma State	Rushing	Ollie Gordon II	25 carries, 271 yards, 2 TD
Oklahoma State	Receiving	Leon Johnson III	5 receptions, 149 yards

=== No. 9 Oklahoma ===
No. 9 Oklahoma Sooners at No. 22 Oklahoma State Cowboys – Game summary

Quarter	1	2	3	4	Total
No. 9 Sooners	7	7	7	3	24
No. 22 Cowboys	7	10	0	10	27

at Boone Pickens Stadium • Stillwater, OK

- Date: Saturday, November 4, 2023
- Game time: 2:30 p.m. CDT
- Game weather: • Sunny Temperature: 71
- Game attendance: 54,105
- Referee: Hank Johns
- TV announcers (ABC): Dave Pasch (play-by-play), Dusty Dvoracek (analyst) & Tom Luginbill (sideline)

Game information

First Quarter

- (11:39 OSU – Ollie Gordon II 20 yard rush, Alex Hale kick (Drive: 8 plays, 73 yards, 3:21; OSU 7–0)
- (10:51) OKLA – Gavin Sawchuk 64 yard rush, Zach Schmit kick (Drive: 3 plays, 75 yards, 0:48; Tied 7–7)

Second Quarter

- (14:53) OSU – Alan Bowman 13 yard rush, Alex Hale kick (Drive: 10 plays, 57 yards, 5:17; OSU 14–7)
- (9:42) OSU – Alex Hale 36 yard field goal (Drive: 10 plays, 55 yards, 3:52; OSU 17–7)
- (7:06) OKLA – Drake Stoops 6 yard pass from Dillon Gabriel, Zach Schmit kick (Drive: 9 plays, 75 yards, 2:36; OSU 17–14)

Third Quarter

- (8:05) OKLA – Tawee Walker 23 yard rush, Zach Schmit kick (Drive: 7 plays, 84 yards, 2:52; OKLA 21–17)

Fourth Quarter

- (7:59) OSU – Ollie Gordon II 1 yard rush, Alex Hale kick (Drive: 8 plays, 97 yards, 4:43; OSU 24–21)
- (6:59) OSU – Alex Hale 34 yard field goal (Drive: 4 plays, 3 yards, 0:53; OSU 27–21)
- (4:48) OKLA – Zach Schmit 36 yard field goal (Drive: 6 plays, 57 yards, 2:11; OSU 27–24)

Statistics	OKLA	OKST
First downs	21	27
Total yards	492	480
Rushes/yards	27/148	38/146
Passing yards	344	334
Passing: Comp–Att–Int	26–37–1	28–43–1
Time of possession	22:46	37:14

Team	Category	Player	Statistics
Oklahoma	Passing	Dillon Gabriel	26/37, 344 yards, 1 TD, 1 INT
Oklahoma	Rushing	Gavin Sawchuk	13 carries, 111 yards, 1 TD
Oklahoma	Receiving	Drake Stoops	12 receptions, 134 yards, 1 TD
Oklahoma State	Passing	Alan Bowman	28/42, 334 yards, 1 INT
Oklahoma State	Rushing	Ollie Gordon II	33 carries, 137 yards, 2 TD
Oklahoma State	Receiving	Rashod Owens	10 receptions, 136 yards

=== at UCF ===
No. 15 Oklahoma State Cowboys at UCF Knights – Game summary

Quarter	1	2	3	4	Total
No. 15 Cowboys	0	0	3	0	3
Knights	14	10	14	7	45

at FBC Mortgage Stadium, Orlando, FL

- Date: November 11, 2023
- Game time: 3:30 p.m.
- Game attendance: 44,046
- TV announcers (ESPN): Mike Monaco, Robert Griffin III
- Gamecast

Game information

First Quarter

- UCF: R.J. Harvey 1-yard touchdown run (Colton Boomer kick), 11:50
- UCF: Kobe Hudson 7-yard touchdown pass from John Rhys Plumlee (Colton Boomer kick), 9:08

Second Quarter

- UCF: Colton Boomer 30-yard field goal, 14:04
- UCF: Kobe Hudson 75-yard touchdown pass from John Rhys Plumlee (Colton Boomer kick), 10:35

Third Quarter

- OSU: Alex Hale 25-yard field goal, 10:00
- UCF: R.J. Harvey 92-yard touchdown run (Colton Boomer kick), 8:56
- UCF: Kobe Hudson 14-yard touchdown pass from John Rhys Plumlee (Colton Boomer kick), 4:09

Fourth Quarter

- UCF: R.J. Harvey 2-yard touchdown run (Colton Boomer kick), 9:00

Win Probability

- UCF 64.0

Line

- OSU -2.5

Over/Under

- 63.5

Statistics	OSU	UCF
First downs	15	21
Total yards	277	592
Rushing yards	52	293
Passing yards	225	299
Turnovers	4	1
Time of possession	25:15	34:45

Team	Category	Player	Statistics
Oklahoma State	Passing	Alan Bowman	19–36, 225 yards, 3 INT
Oklahoma State	Rushing	Ollie Gordon II	12 carries, 25 yards
Oklahoma State	Receiving	Rashod Owens	6 receptions, 85 yards
UCF	Passing	John Rhys Plumlee	11–18, 299 yards, 3 TD
UCF	Rushing	R. J. Harvey	24 carries, 206 yards, 3 TD
UCF	Receiving	Javon Baker	4 receptions, 112 yards

=== At Houston ===
No. 23 Oklahoma State Cowboys at Houston Cougars – Game summary

Quarter	1	2	3	4	Total
No. 23 Cowboys	3	16	14	10	43
Cougars	14	9	0	7	30

at TDECU Stadium • Houston, TX

- Date: Saturday, November 18, 2023
- Game time: 3:00 p.m. CST
- Game weather: • Sunny Temperature: 74 °F (23 °C)
- Game attendance: 33,906
- Referee: Stephon Baron
- TV announcers (ESPN2): Dave Flemming (play-by-play), Brock Osweiler (analyst) Kayla Burton (sideline)

Game information

First Quarter

Second Quarter

Third Quarter

Fourth Quarter

Statistics	OKST	HOU
First downs	28	18
Total yards	501	393
Rushing yards	153	130
Passing yards	348	263
Passing: Comp–Att–Int	29–43–1	18–30–2
Time of possession	32:12	27:48

Team	Category	Player	Statistics
Oklahoma State	Passing	Alan Bowman	29/43, 348 yards, 2 TD, 1 INT
Oklahoma State	Rushing	Ollie Gordon II	25 carries, 164 yards, 3 TD
Oklahoma State	Receiving	Brennan Presley	15 receptions, 189 yards
Houston	Passing	Donovan Smith	17/29, 235 yards, 1 TD, 2 INT
Houston	Rushing	Donovan Smith	13 carries, 63 yards, 1 TD
Houston	Receiving	Jonah Wilson	1 reception, 60 yards, 1 TD

=== BYU ===
BYU Cougars at No. 20 Oklahoma State Cowboys – Game summary

Quarter	1	2	3	4	OT	2OT	Total
Cougars	7	17	0	3	7	0	34
No. 20 Cowboys	6	0	7	14	7	6	40

at Boone Pickens Stadium • Stillwater, OK

- Date: Saturday, November 25, 2023
- Game time: 2:30 p.m. CST
- Game weather: • Cloudy Temperature: 40
- Game attendance: 53,865
- Referee: Michael Vandervelde
- TV announcers (ABC): Anish Schroff (play-by-play), Andre Ward (analyst) & Paul Carcaterra (sideline)

Game information

First Quarter

Second Quarter

Third Quarter

Fourth Quarter

Statistics	BYU	OKST
First downs	14	28
Total yards	327	503
Rushing yards	130	182
Passing yards	197	321
Passing: Comp–Att–Int	15-31-0	31-47-2
Time of possession	25:30	34:30

Team	Category	Player	Statistics
BYU	Passing	Jake Retzlaff	14/30, 161 yards
BYU	Rushing	Aidan Robbins	16 carries, 74 yards
BYU	Receiving	Keanu Hill	2 receptions, 69 yards
Oklahoma State	Passing	Alan Bowman	31/47, 321 yards, 2 INT
Oklahoma State	Rushing	Ollie Gordon II	34 carries, 166 yards, 5 TD
Oklahoma State	Receiving	Leon Johnson III	9 receptions, 132 yards

=== 2023 Big XII Championship vs. No. 7 Texas ===
No. 18 Oklahoma State Cowboys vs. No. 7 Texas Longhorns – Game summary

Quarter	1	2	3	4	Total
No. 18 Cowboys	7	7	0	7	21
No. 7 Longhorns	21	14	7	7	49

at AT&T Stadium • Arlington, TX

- Date: Saturday, December 2, 2023
- Game time: 11:00 a.m. CST
- Game weather: Indoor
- Game attendance: 84,523
- Referee: Derek Anderson
- TV announcers (ABC): Sean McDonough (play-by-play) Greg McElroy (analyst) Molly McGrath (sideline)

Game information

First Quarter

- (12:52) TEX – Adonai Mitchell 10 yard pass from Quinn Ewers, Bert Auburn kick (Drive: 4 plays, 39 yards, 1:29; TEX 7–0)
- (8:34) TEX – Ja'Tavion Sanders 24 yard pass from Quinn Ewers, Bert Auburn kick (Drive: 4 plays, 84 yards, 1:54; TEX 14–0)
- (5:36) OSU – Brennan Presley 5 yard pass from Alan Bowman, Logan Ward kick (Drive: 8 plays, 75 yards, 2:58; TEX 14–7)
- (1:41) TEX – T'Vondre Sanders 2 yard pass from Quinn Ewers, Bert Auburn kick (Drive: 9 plays, 77 yards, 3:49; TEX 21–7)

Second Quarter

- (11:40) TEX – CJ Baxter 10 yard rush, Bert Auburn kick (Drive: 7 plays, 95 yards, 3:12; TEX 28–7)
- (5:50) OSU – Rashod Owens 7 yards pass from Alan Bowman, Logan Ward kick (Drive: 2 plays, 3 yards, 1:16; TEX 28–14)
- (2:11) TEX – Jaydon Blue 8 yard pass from Quinn Ewers, Bert Auburn kick (Drive: 10 plays, 82 yards, 3:34; TEX 35–14)

Third Quarter

- (3:33) TEX – Keilan Robinson 57 yard rush, Bert Auburn kick (Drive: 6 plays, 79 yards, 3:07; TEX 42–14)

Fourth Quarter

- (10:38) TEX – Keilan Robinson 11 yard rush, Bert Auburn kick (Drive: 15 plays, 88 yards, 6:47; TEX 48–14)
- (6:26) OSU – Rashod Owens 3 yard pass from Alan Bowman, Logan Ward kick (Drive: 10 plays, 89 yards, 4:05; TEX 48–21)

Statistics	OKST	TEX
First downs	13	33
Total yards	281	662
Rushes/yards	18/31	40/198
Passing yards	250	464
Passing: Comp–Att–Int	22–38–1	36–47–1
Time of possession	19:54	40:06

Team	Category	Player	Statistics
Oklahoma State	Passing	Alan Bowman	22/38, 250 yards, 3 TD, 1 INT
Oklahoma State	Rushing	Ollie Gordon II	13 carries, 34 yards
Oklahoma State	Receiving	Brennan Presley	9 receptions, 93 yards, 1 TD
Texas	Passing	Quinn Ewers	35/46, 452 yards, 4 TD, 1 INT
Texas	Rushing	Keilan Robinson	4 carries, 75 yards, 2 TD
Texas	Receiving	Ja'Tavion Sanders	8 receptions, 105 yards, 1 TD

=== Texas A&M (2023 Texas Bowl) ===
Texas A&M Aggies vs. No. 20 Oklahoma State Cowboys – Game summary

Quarter	1	2	3	4	Total
Aggies	3	3	14	3	23
No. 20 Cowboys	10	14	7	0	31

at NRG Stadium • Houston, TX

- Date: Wednesday, December 27, 2023
- Game time: 8:00 p.m. CST
- Game weather: Indoor
- Game attendance: 55,212
- Referee: Chris Coyte
- TV announcers (ESPN): Roy Philpott (play-by-play), Roddy Jones (analyst) & Taylor McGregor (sideline)
- Box score

Game information

First quarter

- (8:38) OSU – Alex Hale 19 yard field goal (Drive: 10 plays, 85 yards, 4:42; Oklahoma State 3–0)
- (4:34) TAMU – Randy Bond 37 yard field goal (Drive: 11 plays, 56 yards, 4:04; Tied 3–3)
- (0:21) OSU – Rashod Owens 13 yard pass from Alan Bowman, Logan Ward kick (Drive: 10 plays, 65 yards, 4:13; Oklahoma State 10–3)

Second quarter

- (11:31) TAMU – Randy Bond 24 yard field goal (Drive: 7 plays, 68 yards, 3:50; Oklahoma State 10–6)
- (9:29) OSU – Gunnar Gundy 10 yard run, Logan Ward kick (Drive: 6 plays, 75 yards, 2:02; Oklahoma State 17–6)
- (0:35) OSU – Ollie Gordon II 1 yard run, Logan Ward kick (Drive: 13 plays, 83 yards, 2:37; Oklahoma State 24–6)

Third quarter

- (9:44) TAMU – Amari Daniels 2 yard run, Randy Bond kick (Drive: 6 plays, 60 yards, 3:23; Oklahoma State 24–13)
- (7:17) OSU – Rashod Owens 18 yard pass from Alan Bowman, Logan Ward kick (Drive: 6 plays, 80 yards, 2:27; Oklahoma State 31–13)
- (4:08) TAMU – Marcel Reed 20 yard run, Randy Bond kick (Drive: 6 plays, 75 yards, 3:09; Oklahoma State 31–20)

Fourth quarter

- (5:07) TAMU – Randy Bond 51 yard field goal (Drive: 7 plays, 47 yards, 2:57; Oklahoma State 31–23)

Statistics	TA&M	OKST
First downs	20	29
Total yards	445	570
Rushing yards	73	134
Passing yards	372	436
Passing: Comp–Att–Int	21-35-1	35-50-2
Time of possession	27:31	32:29

Team	Category	Player	Statistics
Texas A&M	Passing	Marcel Reed	20/33, 361 yards, 1 INT
Texas A&M	Rushing	Marcel Reed	10 carries, 29 yards, 1 TD
Texas A&M	Receiving	Jahdae Walker	8 receptions, 137 yards
Oklahoma State	Passing	Alan Bowman	34/49, 402 yards, 2 TD, 2 INT
Oklahoma State	Rushing	Ollie Gordon II	27 carries, 118 yards, 1 TD
Oklahoma State	Receiving	Rashod Owens	10 receptions, 164 yards, 2 TD

== Rankings ==
Ranking movements Legend: ██ Increase in ranking ██ Decrease in ranking — = Not ranked RV = Received votes
	Week															
Poll	Pre	1	2	3	4	5	6	7	8	9	10	11	12	13	14	Final
AP	—	—	—	—	—	—	—	RV	RV	RV	15	24	21	19	22	16
Coaches	RV	RV	—	—	—	—	—	RV	RV	RV	17	25	21	19	21	16
CFP	Not released									22	15	23	20	18	20	Not released
