= Isaac Rex =

American football player (born 1998)

Profile
- Position: Tight end

Personal information
- Born: August 4, 1998 (age 28); San Clemente, California, U.S.
- Listed height: 6 ft 5 in (1.96 m)
- Listed weight: 247 lb (112 kg)

Career information
- High school: San Clemente
- College: BYU (2019–2023)
- NFL draft: 2024: undrafted

Career history
- Detroit Lions (2024)*; Los Angeles Chargers (2024)*
- * Offseason or practice squad member only
- Stats at Pro Football Reference

Isaac Rex (born August 4, 1998) is an American former professional football tight end. He played college football for the BYU Cougars.

== Early life ==
Rex attended high school at San Clemente. He was a two-sport standout and received honors and college attention for both football and basketball. He was San Clemente’s Athlete of the Year. Coming out of high school, Rex was rated as a three-star recruit where he held offers from schools such as BYU, Oregon State, Utah, and Utah State. Ultimately, Rex committed to play college football for the BYU Cougars.

== College career ==
During the 2019 season, Rex redshirted after playing in three games, making one catch for 23 yards. During the 2020 season, Rex hauled in 37 receptions for 429 yards and 12 touchdowns. For his performance on the season, Rex was named a Freshman All-American. In the 2021 season, Rex totaled 18 receptions for 191 yards and three touchdowns before suffering a season ending ankle injury versus USC. During the 2022 season, Rex notched 22 receptions for 320 yards and six touchdowns. In week two of the 2023 season, Rex caught four passes for a career high 112 yards and a touchdown in a win over Southern Utah. In week 12, Rex broke the BYU tight end touchdown record as he pulled in his 23rd career touchdown on a 26 yard reception against Iowa State. In the 2023 season finale, Rex hauled in three receptions for 23 yards, but fumbled in double overtime which cost the Cougars the game as they lost 40-34 against Oklahoma State. During the 2023 season, Rex tallied 34 receptions for 422 yards and three touchdowns.

== Professional career ==
Pre-draft measurables
Height	Weight	Arm length	Hand span	40-yard dash	10-yard split	20-yard split	20-yard shuttle	Three-cone drill	Vertical jump	Bench press
6 ft 5 3/8 in (1.97 m)	247 lb (112 kg)	32 in (0.81 m)	9 3/4 in (0.25 m)	4.94 s	1.75 s	2.84 s	5.00 s	7.35 s	27.0 in (0.69 m)	24 reps
All values from Pro Day

=== Detroit Lions ===
Rex signed with the Detroit Lions as an undrafted free agent on April 27, 2024, but was waived on May 16.

=== Los Angeles Chargers ===
Rex signed with the Los Angeles Chargers on August 22, 2024. He was waived on August 27.

== Personal life ==
Rex is the son of former All-America BYU tight end, Byron Rex. He is married to former Utah Valley University volleyball star Lexi (Davies) Rex and they have one son.

Rex is a member of the Church of Jesus Christ of Latter-day Saints and served a mission for the church in Samoa.
