= Caleb Etienne =

American football player (born 2001)

Rhode Island Breakers
- Position: Offensive tackle
- Roster status: Unsigned draft pick

Personal information
- Born: August 29, 2001 (age 25); New Orleans, Louisiana, U.S.
- Listed height: 6 ft 7 in (2.01 m)
- Listed weight: 329 lb (149 kg)

Career information
- High school: Warren Easton (New Orleans)
- College: Fort Scott (2019); Butler (KS) (2020); Oklahoma State (2021–2022); BYU (2023–2024)
- NFL draft: 2025: undrafted

Career history
- Cincinnati Bengals (2025)*; Minnesota Vikings (2025)*; Rhode Island Breakers (2027-present)
- * Offseason or practice squad member only

Awards and highlights
- First-team All-Big 12 (2024)
- Stats at Pro Football Reference

Caleb Etienne (born August 29, 2001) is an American professional football offensive tackle. After going undrafted in 2025, he was signed by the Cincinnati Bengals, but was waived before the season started. He played college football for the Fort Scott Greyhounds, Butler Grizzlies, Oklahoma State Cowboys, and BYU Cougars.

== Early life ==
Etienne was born on August 29, 2001, in New Orleans, Louisiana. He attended Warren Easton Charter High School in New Orleans and played football as an offensive lineman, helping the football team to a 12–3 record and a state finals appearance in his senior year. He was ranked the 31st-best player in Louisiana coming out of high school by Rivals.com. Etienne initially committed to play college football for the Ole Miss Rebels, but later had to go the junior college route and changed his commitment to the Fort Scott Greyhounds.

== College career ==
As a freshman at Fort Scott in 2019, Etienne helped block for an offense that averaged 23.2 points and 132.9 rushing yards per game, being named first-team NJCAA All-American. He transferred to Butler Community College in 2020, but did not play as the season was canceled due to the COVID-19 pandemic. He was ranked the second-best junior college offensive tackle nationally and transferred to the Oklahoma State Cowboys in 2021.

Etienne appeared in three games for Oklahoma State in 2021 as a redshirt. In 2022, he started all 13 games at left tackle. He transferred to the BYU Cougars in 2023. He was moved to right tackle but had a poor first season with the Cougars, being benched early in the season and later moved to guard, where he saw some success in limited playing time. Pro Football Focus gave Etienne the worst run blocking grade for a BYU player since the statistic had started in 2013. He returned for a final season in 2024 and was moved to left tackle. He ended up starting all 12 games at left tackle in 2024 and was named first-team All-Big 12 Conference.

== Professional career ==
Pre-draft measurables
Height	Weight	Arm length	Hand span	Wingspan	40-yard dash	10-yard split	20-yard split	20-yard shuttle	Three-cone drill	Vertical jump	Broad jump	Bench press
6 ft 6 3/4 in (2.00 m)	329 lb (149 kg)	36 in (0.91 m)	10 5/8 in (0.27 m)	7 ft 2 in (2.18 m)	5.01 s	1.77 s	2.95 s	5.04 s	7.94 s	30.0 in (0.76 m)	9 ft 6 in (2.90 m)	27 reps
All values from Pro Day

=== Cincinnati Bengals ===
On May 9, 2025, Etienne signed with the Cincinnati Bengals as an undrafted free agent after going unselected in the 2025 NFL draft. He was waived on August 26 with an injury designation as part of final roster cuts.

=== Minnesota Vikings ===
On December 16, 2025, Etienne was signed to the Minnesota Vikings' practice squad. He signed a reserve/future contract with Minnesota on January 5, 2026. On June 16, Etienne was waived by the Vikings.

== Personal life ==
Etienne has a son who was born in July 2021.
