= Aidan Robbins =

American football player (born 2000)

Profile
- Position: Running back

Personal information
- Born: December 22, 2000 (age 25); Louisville, Kentucky, U.S.
- Listed height: 6 ft 3 in (1.91 m)
- Listed weight: 240 lb (109 kg)

Career information
- High school: DuPont Manual (Louisville, Kentucky)
- College: Louisville (2019–2021); UNLV (2022); BYU (2023)
- NFL draft: 2024: undrafted

Career history
- Cleveland Browns (2024)*; San Antonio Brahmas (2025)
- * Offseason or practice squad member only

Aidan Robbins (born December 22, 2000) is an American professional football running back. He played college football for the BYU Cougars, Louisville Cardinals, and UNLV Rebels. He played for the Cleveland Browns during the 2024 season.

== Early life ==
Aidan Robbins was born to Ron and Twylia Robbins in Louisville, Kentucky. Growing up, Robbins was involved in numerous activities such as football, basketball, baseball, soccer, track & field, acting, and was even the vice president of student council in middle school. His football career began at age 8. He began training for sports at 9 years old, spending most of his upbringing at Corey Taylor Sports Performance. Growing up, Robbins always played on the offensive line during pop warner due to the league weight limit, but played virtually every position on the defensive side of the ball including free safety. It was not until middle school Robbins would be able to play running back. He attended DuPont Manual High School in Louisville, Kentucky. At DuPont Manual, Robbins was a three-year starter and rushed for over 2,000 yards while playing multiple positions. He also played basketball, ran track, and was a member of the Black Student Union. During his senior year at DuPont Manual High School, Robbins played in just four games where he rushed for 319 yards and seven touchdowns before tearing his labrum in his shoulder. Coming out of high school, he was rated as a highly touted three-star recruit and committed to play college football for the Louisville Cardinals over offers from a plethora of schools such as Kentucky, Purdue, South Carolina, Ole Miss, Missouri, BYU, Vanderbilt, Harvard, Yale, Princeton, and Penn.

== College career ==
=== Louisville ===
In two seasons with Louisville in 2020 and 2021, Robbins rushed seven times for 51 yards and a touchdown. After the 2021 season, he entered his name into the NCAA transfer portal. He graduated with a degree in Business Marketing from Louisville in Spring of 2022 and was a 2x Academic All Atlantic Coast Conference honoree.

=== UNLV ===
Robbins transferred to play for the UNLV Rebels. In week 3 of the 2022 season, he rushed for 227 yards and three touchdowns in a win over North Texas which earned him Mountain West Player of the Week honors and a new career high in rushing. In his lone season with UNLV in 2022, Robbins rushed for 1,011 yards and nine touchdowns and brought in 23 receptions for 125 yards and a touchdown. Robbins gained national exposure and ultimately became one of the best running backs in the nation. He was a PFF All-Conference selection, Academic All Mountain West Conference and was elected as the Mountain West Newcomer of the Year. After the conclusion of the 2022 season, he once again entered his name into the NCAA transfer portal, where he was the 247Sports #2 rated back in the transfer portal.

=== BYU ===
Robbins transferred to play for the BYU Cougars. He was a preseason Phil Steele First Team All Big 12 Selection and a Doak Walker Award Candidate. Robbins suffered a rib fracture in training camp and missed majority of the first half of the 2023 season. In 2023, he rushed 101 times for 485 yards and a touchdown. After the season, Robbins declared for the 2023 NFL draft. In 2024 he was named to the NFF Hampshire Honor Society as a student in BYU's Marriott School of Business MBA Program.

== Professional career ==
Pre-draft measurables
Height	Weight	Arm length	Hand span	40-yard dash	10-yard split	20-yard split	20-yard shuttle	Three-cone drill	Vertical jump	Broad jump	Bench press
6 ft 1 3/4 in (1.87 m)	237 lb (108 kg)	33 3/8 in (0.85 m)	9 1/4 in (0.23 m)	4.60 s	1.62 s	2.63 s	4.40 s	7.17 s	30 in (0.76 m)	9 ft 9 in (2.97 m)	21 reps
All values from Pro Day

=== Cleveland Browns ===
Robbins signed with the Cleveland Browns as an undrafted free agent on May 10, 2024. He was waived on August 26. On December 31, the Browns re-signed Robbins to their practice squad.

=== San Antonio Brahmas ===
On April 16, 2025, Robbins signed with the San Antonio Brahmas of the United Football League (UFL).
