= Kayla Burton =

Australian cricketer

Personal information
- Born: 2 September 2002 (age 24)
- Batting: Right-handed
- Role: Wicket-keeper

Domestic team information
- Years: Team
- 2021/22–present: Australian Capital Territory

Career statistics
Competition	WLA
Matches	11
Runs scored	127
Batting average	12.70
100s/50s	0/0
Top score	30
Balls bowled	–
Wickets	–
Bowling average	–
5 wickets in innings	–
10 wickets in match	–
Best bowling	–
Catches/stumpings	5/1
- Source: CricketArchive, 18 December 2024

Kayla Burton (born 2 September 2002) is an Australian cricketer who plays as a wicket-keeper and right-handed batter for ACT Meteors in the Women's National Cricket League (WNCL). She made her WNCL debut during the Meteors' first match of the 2021–22 season, taking three catches and scoring two runs in a 207-run loss to New South Wales Breakers.
