= 2025 Texas A&M Aggies football team =

American college football season

2025 Texas A&M Aggies football

CFP First Round, L 3–10 vs. Miami (FL)
- Conference: Southeastern Conference

Ranking
- Coaches: No. 8
- AP: No. 8
- Record: 11–2 (7–1 SEC)
- Head coach: Mike Elko (2nd season)
- Offensive coordinator: Collin Klein (2nd season)
- Co-offensive coordinator: Holmon Wiggins (2nd season)
- Offensive scheme: Pro spread
- Defensive coordinator: Jay Bateman (2nd season)
- Co-defensive coordinator: Jordan Peterson (2nd season)
- Base defense: 4–2–5
- Home stadium: Kyle Field

2025 Southeastern Conference football standings
	Conf.			Overall
Team	W		L	W		L
No. 9 Alabama y^	7	–	1	11	–	4
No. 6 Georgia y$^	7	–	1	12	–	2
No. 3 Ole Miss ^	7	–	1	13	–	2
No. 8 Texas A&M ^	7	–	1	11	–	2
No. 13 Oklahoma ^	6	–	2	10	–	3
No. 12 Texas	6	–	2	10	–	3
No. 15 Vanderbilt	6	–	2	10	–	3
Missouri	4	–	4	8	–	5
Tennessee	4	–	4	8	–	5
LSU	3	–	5	7	–	6
Kentucky	2	–	6	5	–	7
Florida	2	–	6	4	–	8
Auburn	1	–	7	5	–	7
Mississippi State	1	–	7	5	–	8
South Carolina	1	–	7	4	–	8
Arkansas	0	–	8	2	–	10
Championship: Georgia 28, Alabama 7
^ – College Football Playoff participant; $ – Conference champion; y – Championship game participant; Rankings from AP Poll

The 2025 Texas A&M Aggies football team represented Texas A&M University during the 2025 NCAA Division I FBS football season. The Aggies played their home games at Kyle Field located in College Station, Texas, and compete as members of the Southeastern Conference (SEC). They were led by Mike Elko in his second year as the team's head coach. Their Week 3 road victory against Notre Dame marked their first against a ranked opponent since 2014. After their week 13 win against Samford, they achieved their first 11–0 start since 1992. They earned a No. 3 ranking in the AP Poll, their highest ranking since 1995, and maintained the ranking from Weeks 9–14. The Aggies finished the season 11–2 after losses to Texas and Miami (FL).

The Texas A&M Aggies football team drew an average home attendance of 106,159 in 2025, the highest in Kyle Field history. The December playoff game against Miami recorded a home attendance of 104,122 fans, the second-highest in college football playoff history.

The game against South Carolina was of note, as the Aggies found themselves in a 30–3 hole in the first half, before ultimately completing the largest comeback win in school history, winning 31–30. It was also the first time since at least 1992 that a team completed a 27+ point comeback in SEC play.

The Texas A&M Aggies earned their first ever College Football Playoff selection, and were eliminated in a first round 10–3 loss to Miami.

== Offseason ==
=== Draft departures ===
Texas A&M players leaving for the NFL Draft
Name	Number	Pos.	Height	Weight	Year	Hometown
Shemar Stewart	4	DE	6'-5" ft	267 lbs	Junior	Miami, FL
Nic Scourton	11	DE	6'-3" ft	257 lbs	Senior	Bryan, TX
Shemar Turner	5	DT	6'-3" ft	293 lbs	Junior	Desoto, TX

== Preseason ==
The SEC media poll was released on July 18, 2025. The Aggies were predicted to finish eighth in the conference.

Predicted finish	Team	Votes (1st place)
1	Texas	3060 (96)
2	Georgia	2957 (44)
3	Alabama	2783 (29)
4	LSU	2668 (20)
5	South Carolina	2109 (5)
6	Florida	1986 (2)
7	Ole Miss	1979 (1)
8	Texas A&M	1892
9	Tennessee	1700 (1)
10	Oklahoma	1613 (3)
11	Auburn	1272 (1)
12	Missouri	1170
13	Vanderbilt	936 (2)
14	Arkansas	764
15	Kentucky	512
16	Mississippi State	343

First-place votes
Rank	Team	Votes
1	Texas	96
2	Georgia	44
3	Alabama	29
4	LSU	20
5	South Carolina	5
6	Oklahoma	3
7	Florida	2
7	Vanderbilt	2
8	Ole Miss	1
8	Tennessee	1
8	Auburn	1

== Schedule ==
Date	Time	Opponent	Rank	Site	TV	Result	Attendance
August 30	6:00 p.m.	UTSA*	No. 19	Kyle Field; College Station, TX	ESPN	W 42–24	107,521
September 6	11:45 a.m.	Utah State*	No. 19	Kyle Field; College Station, TX	SECN	W 44–22	100,026
September 13	6:30 p.m.	at No. 8 Notre Dame*	No. 16	Notre Dame Stadium; Notre Dame, IN	NBC	W 41–40	77,622
September 27	2:30 p.m.	Auburn	No. 9	Kyle Field; College Station, TX	ESPN	W 16–10	108,449
October 4	6:30 p.m.	Mississippi State	No. 6	Kyle Field; College Station, TX	SECN	W 31–9	108,572
October 11	6:00 p.m.	Florida	No. 5	Kyle Field; College Station, TX	ESPN	W 34–17	105,086
October 18	4:30 p.m.	at Arkansas	No. 4	Donald W. Reynolds Razorback Stadium; Fayetteville, AR (rivalry)	ESPN/ESPNews	W 45–42	73,845
October 25	6:30 p.m.	at No. 20 LSU	No. 3	Tiger Stadium; Baton Rouge, LA (rivalry)	ABC	W 49–25	101,924
November 8	2:30 p.m.	at No. 22 Missouri	No. 3	Faurot Field; Columbia, MO	ABC	W 38–17	57,321
November 15	11:00 a.m.	South Carolina	No. 3	Kyle Field; College Station, TX	ESPN	W 31–30	108,582
November 22	11:00 a.m.	Samford*	No. 3	Kyle Field; College Station, TX	SECN+/ESPN+	W 48–0	104,877
November 28	6:30 p.m.	at No. 16 Texas	No. 3	Darrell K Royal–Texas Memorial Stadium; Austin, TX (Lone Star Showdown)	ABC/SECN	L 17–27	103,632
December 20	11:00 a.m.	(10) No. 10 Miami (FL)	(7) No. 7	Kyle Field; College Station, TX (CFP First Round, College GameDay)	ESPN/ABC	L 3–10	104,122
*Non-conference game; Rankings from AP Poll (and CFP Rankings, after November 4) - Released prior to game; All times are in Central time

== Rankings ==
Ranking movements Legend: ██ Increase in ranking ██ Decrease in ranking т = Tied with team above or below ( ) = First-place votes
	Week																
Poll	Pre	1	2	3	4	5	6	7	8	9	10	11	12	13	14	15	Final
AP	19	19	16	10	9	6	5	4	3	3 (1)	3 (1)	3 (4)	3 (1)	3 (1)	7	7	8
Coaches	21т	22	17	10	9	5	5 (1)	4	3	3 (2)	3 (3)	3 (4)	3 (2)	3 (2)	7	7	8
CFP	Not released										3	3	3	3	7	7	Not released

== Personnel ==
2025 Texas A&M Aggies football team roster
Players
Coaches
Offense

Pos.	#	Name	Class
WR	0	Izaiah Williams	Fr
WR	1	Mario Craver	So
WR	2	Terry Bussey	So
WR	3	Ashton Bethel-Roman	Fr
RB	4	Rueben Owens	So
RB	5	Amari Daniels	Sr
WR	7	KC Concepcion	Jr
RB	8	Le'Veon Moss	Sr
QB	9	Jacob Zeno	Sr
QB	10	Marcel Reed	So
OL	11	Kelshaun Johnson	Fr
QB	13	Brady Hart	Fr
QB	14	Eli Morcos	Fr
WR	15	Wesley Watson	Fr
QB	16	Miles O'Neil	Fr
TE	17	Theo Melin Öhrström	Jr
WR	18	TK Norman	Fr
QB	19	Paxton Land	Fr
WR	20	Johnny Ryder	So
TE	21	Kiotti Armstrong	Fr
RB	22	E. J. Smith	GS
RB	23	Jamarion Morrow	Fr
RB	24	Ramarian Tillman	Fr
RB	26	Deondrae "Tiger" Riden Jr.	Fr
RB	27	Ronnie Crosby III	Fr
RB	34	Preston Landis	Sr
WR	38	Whitaker Williams	So
RB	41	A. J. DiNota	Jr
TE	43	Carter Braugh	Fr
TE	43	Zachary Clay	Jr
OL	50	Isendre Ahfua	Fr
OL	52	Blake Ivy	Fr
OL	54	Mark Nabou Jr.	So
OL	55	Ar'maj Reed-Adams	Sr
OL	56	Nelson McGuire	Fr
OL	57	Bryce Barnes	Sr
OL	58	William Huntsinger	Jr
OL	60	Trey Zuhn III	Sr
OL	61	Kolinu'u Faaiu	Sr
OL	62	Marcus Garcia	Fr
OL	62	Collin Strittmatter	So
OL	63	Chance Jackson	Jr
OL	70	Robert Bourdon	Fr
OL	71	Chase Bisontis	Jr
OL	72	Joshua Moses	Fr
OL	73	Ashton Funk	Fr
OL	75	Jonte Newman	Fr
OL	76	Reuben Fatheree II	Sr
OL	77	Tyler Thomas	Fr
OL	78	Dametrious Crownover	Sr
OL	79	Lamont Rogers	Fr
WR	80	Jerome Myles	Fr
TE	81	Luke Braden	Fr
WR	82	Jonah Wilson	So
WR	83	Will Hargett	Fr
WR	84	Blake Buntyn	Fr
TE	84	Amari Niblack	Sr
WR	85	Chase Burton	Fr
TE	87	Nate Boerkircher	GS
TE	88	Micah Riley	Jr
TE	89	Kade Stewart	Fr

Defense

Pos.	#	Name	Class
LB	0	Scooby Williams	Sr
DB	1	Bryce Anderson	Sr
DB	2	Dezz Ricks	So
DB	3	Marcus Ratcliffe	Jr
DB	4	Will Lee III	Sr
DL	5	D. J. Hicks	Jr
DB	6	Julian Humphrey	Jr
DB	7	Tyreek Chappell	Sr
DB	8	Jordan Shaw	So
DL	9	Cashius Howell	Sr
DL	10	Marco Jones	Fr
DL	11	Tyler Onyedim	Sr
DL	12	Nana Boadi-Owusu	So
DB	13	Deyjhon Pettaway	Fr
DB	14	Jayvon Thomas	Jr
DL	15	Rylan Kennedy	Jr
DB	16	Jamar Beal-Goines	Fr
DL	17	Albert Regis	Sr
DL	18	T. J. Searcy	Jr
DB	19	Bravion Rogers	Jr
DB	20	Adonyss Currie	Fr
LB	21	Taurean York	Jr
DB	22	Rashad "Tom Tom" Johnson Jr.	Fr
LB	23	Noah Mikhail	Fr
DB	24	Cobey Sellers	Fr
DB	25	Dalton Brooks	Jr
DB	26	Dashawn Fillmore	Jr
DB	26	Layne Gerke	Fr
LB	27	Daymion Sanford	Jr
DB	28	Jordan Pride	Fr
DB	29	Myles Davis	So
DB	30	J. R. Rosenberg	Fr
DL	30	Solomon Williams	Fr
LB	31	Kelvion Riggins	Fr
LB	32	Tristan Jernigan	So
DB	33	Jarred Kerr	Sr
LB	34	Kyle Garvis	So
S	35	Isaiah Willis	Jr
S	37	Peyton Gay	Fr
DB	38	Benjamin Bruce	Fr
DB	39	Adam Graham	Fr
DL	42	Kendall Jackson	Fr
LB	43	Jeremiah Searcy	Fr
LB	45	Tommy Colligan	Jr
LB	46	Aidan Herrera	So
DL	50	Dayon Hayes	GS
DL	53	Jadon Scarlett	So
LB	54	Jordan Lockhart	So
DL	55	Dealyn Evans	Fr
DL	59	Chace Sims	Fr
DB	86	Ryan Burtin	Fr
DL	88	DJ Sanders	Fr
DT	91	Lucas Pernas	Fr
DE	92	Sam M'Pemba	Jr
DT	94	Nathan Mabon	Fr
DL	96	Nathan Jackson	Jr
DL	97	Alessandro Perez	So
DL	98	Jesse Chukwu	So
DL	99	Landon Rink	Fr

Special teams

Pos.	#	Name	Class
P	36	Truette Tumey	Jr
P	37	Tyler White	So
LS	40	Gray Evans	Fr
K	41	Liam Padron	So
LS	42	Jackson Graham	Fr
LS	45	Levi Hancock	So
K	47	Randy Bond	GS
LS	48	Jacob Graham	GS
K	83	Colton Chmelar	Fr
K	99	Jared Zirkel	GS

Head coach

- Mike Elko

Coordinators/assistant coaches

- Trooper Taylor – Associate head coach (offense)/running backs
- Lyle Hemphill – Associate head coach (defense)
- Jay Bateman –Defensive coordinator/linebackers
- Collin Klein – Offensive coordinator/quarterbacks
- Jordan Peterson – Co-defensive coordinator/defensive backs
- Holmon Wiggins – Co-offensive coordinator/wide receivers
- Ishmael Aristide – Defensive backs
- Adam Cushing – Run game coordinator/offensive linemen
- Patrick Dougherty – Special teams coordinator
- Tony Jerod-Eddie – Defensive linemen
- Sean Spencer – Defensive linemen
- Josh Buford – Offensive analyst
- Wisly Desire – Offensive analyst
- Christian Ellsworth – Tight ends
- Bryant Gross-Armiento – Nickels
- Keith Larson – Special teams analyst
- Joey Lynch – Senior offensive analyst
- Preston Mason – Defensive analyst
- John Perry – Assistant wide receivers
- Stan Watson – Senior defensive analyst
- Malik Davis – Defensive graduate assistant
- Gavin Spurrier – Offensive graduate assistant
- Deveonte Mackey – Offensive analyst

Legend

- (C) Team captain
- (S) Suspended
- (I) Ineligible
- Injured
- Redshirt

Roster
Last update: 6/19/25

== Game summaries ==
=== vs UTSA ===
UTSA Roadrunners (0–0) at No. 19 Texas A&M Aggies (0–0) – Game summary

Quarter	1	2	3	4	Total
Roadrunners	3	7	7	7	24
No. 19 Aggies	7	14	14	7	42

at Kyle Field • College Station, TX

- Date: August 30
- Game time: 6:00 p.m. CDT
- Game weather: Cloudy • Temperature: 84 °F (29 °C) • Wind: NE at 18 miles per hour (29 km/h)
- Game attendance: 107,521
- Referee: Matt Loeffler
- TV announcers (ESPN): Anish Shroff, Andre Ware, and Paul Carcaterra
- Box score, Recap

Game information

First quarter

- TA&M – KC Concepcion 80-yard punt return (Jared Zirkel kick), 7:21. Aggies 7–0.
- UTSA – Michael Petro 36-yard field goal, 1:53. Aggies 7–3. Drive: 12 plays, 56 yards, 5:28.

Second quarter

- TA&M – Mario Craver 24-yard pass from Marcel Reed (Jared Zirkel kick), 13:13. Aggies 14–3. Drive: 7 plays, 63 yards, 3:40.
- UTSA – Robert Henry Jr. 15-yard run (Michael Petro kick), 8:33. Aggies 14–10. Drive: 9 plays, 75 yards, 4:40.
- TA&M – KC Concepcion 31-yard pass from Marcel Reed (Jared Zirkel kick), 5:38. Aggies 21–10. Drive: 6 plays, 67 yards, 2:55.

Third quarter

- UTSA – Robert Henry Jr. 75-yard run (Michael Petro kick), 14:47. Aggies 21–17. Drive: 1 play, 75 yards, 0:13.
- TA&M – Theo Melin Öhrström 1-yard pass from Marcel Reed (Jared Zirkel kick), 7:10. Aggies 28–17. Drive: 9 plays, 78 yards, 4:31.
- TA&M – Mario Craver 22-yard pass from Marcel Reed (Jared Zirkel kick), 2:48. Aggies 35–17. Drive: 5 plays, 67 yards, 2:48.

Fourth quarter

- TA&M – E. J. Smith 3-yard run (Jared Zirkel kick), 7:16. Aggies 42–17. Drive: 3 plays, 29 yards, 1:18.
- UTSA – A. J. Wilson 34-yard pass from Brandon Tennison (Michael Petro kick), 0:14. Aggies 42–24. Drive: 9 plays, 72 yards, 3:08.

Statistics	UTSA	TA&M
First downs	17	17
Plays–yards	67–373	59–399
Rushes–yards	33–203	23–108
Passing yards	170	291
Passing: comp–att–int	21–34–0	23–36–0
Turnovers	0	0
Time of possession	33:41	26:19

Team	Category	Player	Statistics
UTSA	Passing	Owen McCown	19/32, 121 yards
UTSA	Rushing	Robert Henry Jr.	16 carries, 177 yards, 2 TD
UTSA	Receiving	David Amador II	3 receptions, 41 yards
Texas A&M	Passing	Marcel Reed	22/34, 289 yards, 4 TD
Texas A&M	Rushing	Marcel Reed	8 carries, 39 yards
Texas A&M	Receiving	Mario Craver	8 receptions, 122 yards, 2 TD

=== vs Utah State ===
Utah State Aggies (1–0) at No. 19 Texas A&M Aggies (1–0) – Game summary

Quarter	1	2	3	4	Total
Utah State	6	0	8	8	22
No. 19 Texas A&M	10	20	7	7	44

at Kyle Field • College Station, TX

- Date: September 6
- Game time: 11:45 a.m. CDT
- Game weather: Cloudy, 82 °F (28 °C)
- Game attendance: 100,026
- Referee: Jeff Heaser
- TV announcers (SECN): Taylor Zarzour, Matt Stinchcomb, and Alyssa Lang
- Box score, Recap

Game information

First quarter

- TA&M – Terry Bussey 34-yard pass from Marcel Reed (Jared Zirkel kick), 10:51. Texas A&M 7–0. Drive: 3 plays, 55 yards, 1:14.
- USU – Miles Davis 3-yard pass from Anthony Garcia (pass failed), 7:02. Texas A&M 7–6. Drive: 9 plays, 75 yards, 3:49.
- TA&M – Jared Zirkel 37-yard field goal, 2:55. Texas A&M 10–6. Drive: 8 plays, 55 yards, 4:07.

Second quarter

- TA&M – Marcel Reed 1-yard run (Jared Zirkel kick), 12:01. Texas A&M 17–6. Drive: 10 plays, 63 yards, 3:55.
- TA&M – Le'Veon Moss 21-yard run (Jared Zirkel kick), 3:18. Texas A&M 24–6. Drive: 6 plays, 63 yards, 3:19.
- TA&M – KC Concepcion 12-yard pass from Marcel Reed (kick failed), 0:16. Texas A&M 30–6. Drive: 8 plays, 77 yards, 1:25.

Third quarter

- USU – Braden Pegan 16-yard pass from Bryson Barnes (Bryson Barnes pass to Javen Jacobs), 12:45. Texas A&M 30–14. Drive: 7 plays, 75 yards, 2:15.
- TA&M – KC Concepcion 8-yard pass from Marcel Reed (Jared Zirkel kick), 6:07. Texas A&M 37–14. Drive: 9 plays, 80 yards, 4:31.

Fourth quarter

- TA&M – Mario Craver 72-yard pass from Miles O'Neil (Jared Zirkel kick), 13:36. Texas A&M 44–14. Drive: 4 plays, 83 yards, 1:40.
- USU – Miles Davis 1-yard pass from Bryson Barnes (Bryson Barnes pass to Braden Pegan), 4:24. Texas A&M 44–22. Drive: 8 plays, 67 yards, 3:21.

Statistics	USU	TA&M
First downs	18	30
Plays–yards	66–250	79–554
Rushes–yards	35–78	45–235
Passing yards	172	319
Passing: comp–att–int	16–31–0	22–34–1
Turnovers	1	1
Time of possession	25:46	34:14

Team	Category	Player	Statistics
Utah State	Passing	Bryson Barnes	15/30, 169 yards, 2 TD
Utah State	Rushing	Miles Davis	10 carries, 50 yards
Utah State	Receiving	Brady Boyd	6 receptions, 87 yards
Texas A&M	Passing	Marcel Reed	19/28, 220 yards, 3 TD
Texas A&M	Rushing	Le'Veon Moss	10 carries, 68 yards, TD
Texas A&M	Receiving	Mario Craver	5 receptions, 114 yards, TD

=== at No. 8 Notre Dame ===
No. 16 Texas A&M Aggies (2–0) at No. 8 Notre Dame Fighting Irish (0–1) – Game summary

Quarter	1	2	3	4	Total
No. 16 Aggies	7	21	3	10	41
No. 8 Fighting Irish	14	10	7	9	40

at Notre Dame Stadium • South Bend, IN

- Date: September 13
- Game time: 6:30 p.m. CDT
- Game weather: Cloudy, 72 °F (22 °C), Wind SE @ 6 mph (10 km/h)
- Game attendance: 77,622
- Referee: Kyle Olson
- TV announcers (NBC): Noah Eagle, Todd Blackledge, and Kathryn Tappen
- Box score, Recap

Game information

First quarter

- (13:06) ND – Tae Johnson 20-yard blocked punt return, Noah Burnette kick (Drive: 1:54; Notre Dame 7–0)
- (9:33) TA&M – Mario Craver 86-yard pass from Marcel Reed, Randy Bond kick (Drive: 2 plays, 90 yards, 0:47; Tied 7–7)
- (6:30) ND – Jadarian Price 7-yard run, Noah Burnette kick (Drive: 7 plays, 75 yards, 3:03; Notre Dame 14–7)

Second quarter

- (14:54) ND – Noah Burnette 22-yard field goal (Drive: 11 plays, 38 yards, 5:55; Notre Dame 17–7)
- (12:23) TA&M – Le'Veon Moss 1-yard run, Randy Bond kick (Drive: 5 plays, 75 yards, 2:31; Notre Dame 17–14)
- (9:43) ND – Jeremiyah Love 36-yard pass from CJ Carr, Noah Burnette kick (Drive: 6 plays, 75 yards, 2:40; Notre Dame 24–14)
- (5:32) TA&M – Le'Veon Moss 2-yard run, Randy Bond kick (Drive: 9 plays, 75 yards, 4:11; Notre Dame 24–21)
- (1:11) TA&M – Le'Veon Moss 1-yard run, Randy Bond kick (Drive: 7 plays, 47 yards, 2:20; Texas A&M 28–24)

Third quarter

- (8:17) ND – Jadarian Price 17-yard run, Noah Burnette kick (Drive: 5 plays, 29 yards, 2:15; Notre Dame 31–28)
- (0:44) TA&M – Randy Bond 43-yard field goal (Drive: 6 plays, 25 yards, 2:50; Tied 31–31)

Fourth quarter

- (14:01) ND – Noah Burnette 39-yard field goal (Drive: 6 plays, 44 yards, 1:36; Notre Dame 34–31)
- (9:06) TA&M – Randy Bond 45-yard field goal (Drive: 11 plays, 47 yards, 4:55; Tied 34–34)
- (2:53) ND – Jeremiyah Love 12-yard run, Preston Zinter pass from Tyler Buchner failed (Drive: 12 plays, 75 yards, 6:13; Notre Dame 40–34)
- (0:13) TA&M – Nate Boerkircher 11-yard pass from Marcel Reed, Randy Bond kick (Drive: 13 plays, 74 yards, 2:28; Texas A&M 41–40)

Statistics	TA&M	ND
First downs	24	23
Plays–yards	69–488	71–429
Rushes–yards	32–128	39–136
Passing yards	360	293
Passing: comp–att–int	17–37–1	20–32–1
Turnovers	1	1
Time of possession	26:53	33:07

Team	Category	Player	Statistics
Texas A&M	Passing	Marcel Reed	17/37, 360 yards, 2 TD, INT
Texas A&M	Rushing	Le'Veon Moss	20 carries, 81 yards, 3 TD
Texas A&M	Receiving	Mario Craver	7 receptions, 207 yards, TD
Notre Dame	Passing	CJ Carr	20/32, 293 yards, TD, INT
Notre Dame	Rushing	Jeremiyah Love	23 carries, 94 yards, TD
Notre Dame	Receiving	Eli Raridon	4 receptions, 85 yards

=== vs Auburn ===
Auburn Tigers (3–1) at No. 9 Texas A&M Aggies (3–0) – Game summary

Quarter	1	2	3	4	Total
Tigers	0	3	0	7	10
No. 9 Aggies	7	6	0	3	16

at Kyle Field • College Station, TX

- Date: September 27
- Game time: 2:40 p.m. CDT
- Game weather: Sunny • Temperature: 88 °F (31 °C) • Wind: NE 7 mph
- Game attendance: 108,449
- Referee: Daniel Gautreaux
- TV announcers (ESPN): Joe Tessitore, Jesse Palmer, and Katie George
- Box score, Recap

Game information

First quarter

- TA&M – Le'Veon Moss 4-yard run (Randy Bond kick), 12:14. Texas A&M 7–0. Drive: 4 plays, 66 yards, 1:41.

Second quarter

- AUB – Alex McPherson 32-yard field goal, 10:50. Texas A&M 7–3. Drive: 8 plays, 57 yards, 2:38.
- TA&M – Randy Bond 33-yard field goal, 6:49. Texas A&M 10–3. Drive: 9 plays, 60 yards, 4:01.
- TA&M – Randy Bond 49-yard field goal, 1:45. Texas A&M 13–3. Drive: 8 plays, 25 yards, 2:53.

Third quarter

No scoring

Fourth quarter

- AUB – Jackson Arnold 2-yard run (Alex McPherson kick), 10:20. Texas A&M 13–10. Drive: 1 play, 2 yards, 0:17.
- TA&M – Randy Bond 44-yard field goal, 2:42. Texas A&M 16–10. Drive: 5 plays, 21 yards, 2:28.

Statistics	AUB	TA&M
First downs	9	21
Plays–yards	57–177	69–414
Rushes–yards	24–52	47–207
Passing yards	125	207
Passing: comp–att–int	18–33–0	15–22–1
Turnovers	0	1
Time of possession	25:54	34:06

Team	Category	Player	Statistics
Auburn	Passing	Jackson Arnold	18/33, 125 yards
Auburn	Rushing	Jeremiah Cobb	6 carries, 28 yards
Auburn	Receiving	Eric Singleton Jr.	5 receptions, 56 yards
Texas A&M	Passing	Marcel Reed	15/22, 207 yards, INT
Texas A&M	Rushing	Le'Veon Moss	21 carries, 139 yards, TD
Texas A&M	Receiving	KC Concepcion	7 receptions, 113 yards

=== vs Mississippi State ===
Mississippi State Bulldogs (4–1) at No. 6 Texas A&M Aggies (4–0) – Game summary

Quarter	1	2	3	4	Total
Bulldogs	3	0	0	6	9
No. 6 Aggies	0	7	7	17	31

at Kyle Field • College Station, TX

- Date: October 4
- Game time: 6:30 p.m.
- Game weather:
- Game attendance: 108,572
- Referee: Kyle Olson
- TV announcers (SECN): Tom Hart, Jordan Rodgers, and Cole Cubelic
- Box score, Recap

Game information

First quarter

- MSST – Kyle Ferrie 24-yard field goal, 4:21. Bulldogs 3–0. Drive: 15 plays, 22 yards, 5:45.

Second quarter

- TA&M – KC Concepcion 34-yard pass from Marcel Reed (Randy Bond kick), 1:51. Aggies 7–3. Drive: 6 plays, 64 yards, 2:23.

Third quarter

- TA&M – KC Concepcion 2-yard pass from Marcel Reed (Randy Bond kick), 3:30. Aggies 14–3. Drive: 5 plays, 62 yards, 2:09.

Fourth quarter

- TA&M – Marcel Reed 7-yard run (Randy Bond kick), 11:38. Aggies 21–3. Drive: 10 plays, 79 yards, 5:28.
- TA&M – Mario Craver 7-yard run (Randy Bond kick), 9:13. Aggies 28–3. Drive: 4 plays, 24 yards, 2:12.
- MSST – Brenen Thompson 44-yard pass from Blake Shapen (run failed), 7:53. Aggies 28–9. Drive: 5 plays, 75 yards, 1:20.
- TA&M – Randy Bond 27-yard field goal, 4:41. Aggies 31–9. Drive: 7 plays, 65 yards, 3:11.

Statistics	MSST	TA&M
First downs	14	23
Plays–yards	51–219	77–479
Rushes–yards	31–77	54–299
Passing yards	142	180
Passing: comp–att–int	15–20–1	13–23–1
Turnovers	2	1
Time of possession	21:43	38:17

Team	Category	Player	Statistics
Mississippi State	Passing	Blake Shapen	15/20, 142 yards, TD, INT
Mississippi State	Rushing	Fluff Bothwell	14 carries, 60 yards
Mississippi State	Receiving	Brenen Thompson	2 receptions, 54 yards, TD
Texas A&M	Passing	Marcel Reed	13/23, 2 TD, INT
Texas A&M	Rushing	Rueben Owens II	21 carries, 142 yards
Texas A&M	Receiving	Mario Craver	6 receptions, 80 yards

=== vs Florida ===
Florida Gators (2–3) at No. 5 Texas A&M Aggies (5–0) – Game summary

Quarter	1	2	3	4	Total
Gators	14	0	3	0	17
No. 5 Aggies	14	7	3	10	34

at Kyle Field • College Station, TX

- Date: October 11
- Game time: 6:00 p.m. CDT
- Game weather:
- Game attendance: 105,086
- Referee: Lee Hedrick
- TV announcers (ESPN): Mark Jones, Roddy Jones, and Quint Kessenich
- Box score, Recap

Game information

First quarter

- FLA – Amir Jackson 1-yard pass from DJ Lagway (Trey Smack kick), 11:08. Gators 7–0. Drive: 8 plays, 75 yards, 3:52.
- TA&M – Marcel Reed 8-yard run (Randy Bond kick), 10:14. Tied 7–7. Drive: 2 plays, 75 yards, 0:54.
- TA&M – Jamarion Morrow 22-yard pass from Marcel Reed (Randy Bond kick), 6:19. Aggies 14–7. Drive: 6 plays, 81 yards, 2:31.
- FLA – Dallas Wilson 6-yard pass from DJ Lagway (Trey Smack kick), 3:38. Tied 14–14. Drive: 6 plays, 75 yards, 2:41.

Second quarter

- TA&M – Le'Veon Moss 22-yard run (Randy Bond kick), 13:04. Aggies 21–14. Drive: 11 plays, 75 yards, 5:34.

Third quarter

- TA&M – Randy Bond 26-yard field goal, 10:42. Aggies 24–14. Drive: 5 plays, 21 yards, 2:07.
- FLA – Trey Smack 45-yard field goal, 7:08. Aggies 24–17. Drive: 9 plays, 47 yards, 3:29.

Fourth quarter

- TA&M – Rueben Owens II 2-yard run (Randy Bond kick), 4:39. Aggies 31–17. Drive: 13 plays, 50 yards, 8:09.
- TA&M – Randy Bond 22-yard field goal, 1:11. Aggies 34–17. Drive: 8 plays, 18 yards, 3:17.

Statistics	FLA	TA&M
First downs	15	19
Plays–yards	61-319	68-417
Rushes–yards	24-74	42-183
Passing yards	245	234
Passing: comp–att–int	21-37-0	16-26-1
Turnovers	2	1
Time of possession	26:18	33:42

Team	Category	Player	Statistics
Florida	Passing	DJ Lagway	21/37, 245 yards, 2 TD
Florida	Rushing	Jadan Baugh	18 carries, 65 yards
Florida	Receiving	Vernell Brown III	6 receptions, 77 yards
Texas A&M	Passing	Marcel Reed	16/26, 234 yards, TD, INT
Texas A&M	Rushing	Rueben Owens II	17 carries, 51 yards, TD
Texas A&M	Receiving	Mario Craver	2 receptions, 77 yards

=== at Arkansas (Southwest Classic) ===
No. 4 Texas A&M Aggies (6–0) at Arkansas Razorbacks (2–4) – Game summary

Quarter	1	2	3	4	Total
No. 4 Aggies	7	14	17	7	45
Razorbacks	3	17	7	15	42

at Donald W. Reynolds Razorback Stadium • Fayetteville, AR

- Date: October 18
- Game time: 5:30 p.m.
- Game weather: Rain • Temperature: 67 °F (19 °C) • Wind: NE at 14 miles per hour (23 km/h)
- Game attendance: 73,845
- Referee: Jason Autrey
- TV announcers (ESPN): Mark Jones, Roddy Jones, and Quint Kessenich
- Box score, Recap

Game information

First quarter

- ARK – Scott Starzyk 22-yard field goal, 11:21. Razorbacks 3–0. Drive: 7 plays, 71 yards, 3:39.
- TA&M – Ashton Bethel-Roman 24-yard pass from Marcel Reed (Randy Bond kick), 6:06. Aggies 7–3. Drive: 10 plays, 75 yards, 5:15.

Second quarter

- TA&M – Marcel Reed 3-yard run (Randy Bond kick), 14:49. Aggies 14–3. Drive: 6 plays, 49 yards, 3:05.
- ARK – Scott Starzyk 22-yard field goal, 11:17. Aggies 14–6. Drive: 9 plays, 71 yards, 3:32.
- TA&M – Nate Boerkircher 1-yard pass from Marcel Reed (Randy Bond kick), 3:32. Aggies 21–6. Drive: 14 plays, 75 yards, 7:45.
- ARK – Taylen Green 27-yard run (Scott Starzyk kick), 1:51. Aggies 21–13. Drive: 5 plays, 75 yards, 1:41.
- ARK – O'Mega Blake 7-yard pass from Taylen Green (Scott Starzyk kick), 0:02. Aggies 21–20. Drive: 5 plays, 71 yards, 0:41.

Third quarter

- TA&M – KC Concepcion 17-yard pass from Marcel Reed (Randy Bond kick), 13:34. Aggies 28–20. Drive: 3 plays, 75 yards, 1:26.
- TA&M – Randy Bond 29-yard field goal, 7:45. Aggies 31–20. Drive: 9 plays, 73 yards, 4:17.
- ARK – Taylen Green 1-yard run (Scott Starzyk kick), 4:28. Aggies 31–27. Drive: 7 plays, 65 yards, 3:17.
- TA&M – Rueben Owens II 14-yard run (Randy Bond kick), 0:25. Aggies 38–27. Drive: 9 plays, 75 yards, 4:03.

Fourth quarter

- ARK – Jaden Platt 4-yard pass from Taylen Green (Taylen Green–Rohan Jones pass), 11:30. Aggies 38–35. Drive: 10 plays, 75 yards, 3:55.
- TA&M – Rueben Owens II 12-yard run (Randy Bond kick), 6:52. Aggies 45–35. Drive: 10 plays, 75 yards, 4:38.
- ARK – CJ Brown 4-yard pass from Taylen Green (Scott Starzyk kick), 0:10. Aggies 45–42. Drive: 12 plays, 93 yards, 3:41.

Statistics	TA&M	ARK
First downs	28	25
Plays–yards	67-497	65-527
Rushes–yards	34-217	32-268
Passing yards	280	259
Passing: comp–att–int	23-32-0	20-33-0
Turnovers	0	0
Time of possession	33:48	26:12

Team	Category	Player	Statistics
Texas A&M	Passing	Marcel Reed	23/32, 280 yards, 3 TD
Texas A&M	Rushing	Rueben Owens II	14 carries, 69 yards, 2 TD
Texas A&M	Receiving	Ashton Bethel-Roman	4 receptions, 83 yards, TD
Arkansas	Passing	Taylen Green	19/32, 256 yards, 3 TD
Arkansas	Rushing	Mike Washington Jr.	16 carries, 147 yards
Arkansas	Receiving	O'Mega Blake	7 receptions, 118 yards, TD

=== at No. 20 LSU (rivalry) ===
No. 3 Texas A&M Aggies (7–0) at No. 20 LSU Tigers (5–2) – Game summary

Quarter	1	2	3	4	Total
No. 3 Aggies	14	0	21	14	49
No. 20 Tigers	7	11	0	7	25

at Tiger Stadium • Baton Rouge, LA

- Date: October 25
- Game time: 6:30 p.m.
- Game weather: Cloudy, 71°, Wind SE 8mph
- Game attendance: 101,924
- Referee: James Carter
- TV announcers (ABC): Chris Fowler, Kirk Herbstreit, and Holly Rowe
- Box score, Recap

Game information

First quarter

- TA&M – Marcel Reed 41-yard run (Randy Bond kick), 10:10. Aggies 7–0. Drive: 6 plays, 68 yards, 2:37.
- LSU – Trey'Dez Green 5-yard pass from Garrett Nussmeier (Damian Ramos kick), 5:38. Tied 7–7. Drive: 8 plays, 74 yards, 4:32.
- TA&M – KC Concepcion 15-yard pass from Marcel Reed (Randy Bond kick), 0:40. Aggies 14–7. Drive: 10 plays, 75 yards, 4:58.

Second quarter

- LSU – Punt blocked by J. Thomas, out of bounds for Safety, 12:13. Aggies 14–9.
- LSU – Harlem Berry 7-yard run (Damian Ramos kick failed), 3:09. Tigers 15–14. Drive: 8 plays, 75 yards, 3:47.
- LSU – Damian Ramos 30-yard field goal, 0:20. Tigers 18–14. Drive: 6 plays, 36 yards, 0:54.

Third quarter

- TA&M – Marcel Reed 5-yard run (Randy Bond kick), 10:41. Aggies 21–18. Drive: 9 plays, 56 yards, 4:19.
- TA&M – KC Concepcion 79-yard punt return (Randy Bond kick), 8:47. Aggies 28–18.
- TA&M – Jamarion Morrow 24-yard pass from Marcel Reed (Randy Bond kick), 4:02. Aggies 35–18. Drive: 4 plays, 50 yards, 1:40.

Fourth quarter

- TA&M – Nate Boerkircher 1-yard run (Randy Bond kick), 14:15. Aggies 42–18. Drive: 6 plays, 33 yards, 3:22.
- TA&M – Jamarion Morrow 11-yard run (Randy Bond kick), 6:12. Aggies 49–18. Drive: 5 plays, 29 yards, 2:35.
- LSU – Kyle Parker 12-yard pass from Michael Van Buren Jr. (Damian Ramos kick), 0:59. Aggies 49–25. Drive: 12 plays, 75 yards, 5:13.

Statistics	TA&M	LSU
First downs	24	18
Plays–yards	61-426	66-278
Rushes–yards	40-224	27-60
Passing yards	202	218
Passing: comp–att–int	12-21-2	25-39-0
Turnovers	2	0
Time of possession	30:12	29:48

Team	Category	Player	Statistics
Texas A&M	Passing	Marcel Reed	12/21, 202 yards, 2 TD, 2 INT
Texas A&M	Rushing	Marcel Reed	13 carries, 108 yards, 2 TD
Texas A&M	Receiving	Ashton Bethel-Roman	1 reception, 47 yds
LSU	Passing	Garrett Nussmeier	22/35, 168 yards, TD
LSU	Rushing	Harlem Berry	9 carries, 59 yards, TD
LSU	Receiving	Barion Brown	4 receptions, 60 yards

=== at No. 22 Missouri ===
No. 3 Texas A&M Aggies (8–0) at No. 22 Missouri Tigers (6–2) – Game summary

Quarter	1	2	3	4	Total
No. 3 Aggies	7	7	10	14	38
No. 22 Tigers	0	0	7	10	17

at Faurot Field • Columbia, MO

- Date: November 8
- Game time: 2:30 p.m.
- Game weather: Cloudy, 59°, Wind, S 5mph
- Game attendance: 57,321
- Referee: Jeff Heaser
- TV announcers (ABC): Joe Tessitore, Jesse Palmer, and Katie George
- Box score, Recap

Game information

First quarter

- TA&M – Ashton Bethel-Roman 4-yard pass from Marcel Reed (Randy Bond kick), 1:16. Aggies 7–0. Drive: 9 plays, 59 yards, 4:37.

Second quarter

- TA&M – EJ Smith 1-yard run (Randy Bond kick), 0:20. Aggies 14–0. Drive: 2 plays, 2 yards, 0:37.

Third quarter

- TA&M – KC Concepcion 48-yard pass from Marcel Reed (Randy Bond kick), 11:21. Aggies 21–0. Drive: 4 plays, 68 yards, 1:36.
- MIZ – Jamal Roberts 4-yard run (Robert Meyer kick), 6:50. Aggies 21–7. Drive: 8 plays, 40 yards, 4:20.
- TA&M – Randy Bond 32-yard field goal, 3:10. Aggies 24–7. Drive: 8 plays, 59 yards, 3:34.

Fourth quarter

- MIZ – Oliver Robbins 49-yard field goal, 11:17. Aggies 24–10. Drive: 10 plays, 52 yards, 3:34.
- TA&M – Rueben Owens II 57-yard run (Randy Bond kick), 7:40. Aggies 31–10. Drive: 6 plays, 76 yards, 3:29.
- MIZ – Ahmad Hardy 45-yard run (Robert Meyer kick), 6:45. Aggies 31–17. Drive: 4 plays, 71 yards, 0:49.
- TA&M – Rueben Owens II 1-yard run (Randy Bond kick), 2:36. Aggies 38–17. Drive: 7 plays, 65 yards, 4:08.

Statistics	TA&M	MIZ
First downs	21	17
Plays–yards	68–464	56–284
Rushes–yards	39–243	34–207
Passing yards	221	77
Passing: comp–att–int	20–29–0	7–22–0
Turnovers	1	2
Time of possession	35:44	24:16

Team	Category	Player	Statistics
Texas A&M	Passing	Marcel Reed	20/29, 221 yards, 2 TD
Texas A&M	Rushing	Rueben Owens II	13 carries, 102 yards, 2 TD
Texas A&M	Receiving	KC Concepcion	4 receptions, 84 yards, TD
Missouri	Passing	Matt Zollers	7/22, 77 yards
Missouri	Rushing	Jamal Roberts	17 carries, 110 yards, TD
Missouri	Receiving	Donovan Olugbode	3 receptions, 74 yards

=== vs South Carolina ===
This game featured a surprising lead by the underdog Gamecocks, punctuated by the 2025 Texas A&M–South Carolina football sideline incident where a police officer harassed South Carolina players. However, the Aggies came back in the second half and won the game in dramatic fashion.

South Carolina Gamecocks (3–6) at No. 3 Texas A&M Aggies (9–0) – Game summary

Quarter	1	2	3	4	Total
Gamecocks	17	13	0	0	30
No. 3 Aggies	3	0	21	7	31

at Kyle Field • College Station, TX

- Date: November 15
- Game time: 11:00 a.m.
- Game weather: Cloudy, 77 °F (25 °C), Wind W 9mph
- Game attendance: 108,582
- Referee: David Smith
- TV announcers (ESPN): Dave Pasch, Dusty Dvoracek, and Taylor McGregor
- Box score, Recap

Game information

First quarter

- SC – William Joyce 36-yard field goal, 11:10. Gamecocks 3–0. Drive: 10 plays, 57 yards, 3:50.
- TA&M – Randy Bond 40-yard field goal, 7:55. Tied 3–3. Drive: 7 plays, 52 yards, 3:15.
- SC – Vandrevius Jacobs 50-yard pass from LaNorris Sellers (William Joyce kick), 5:28. Gamecocks 10–3. Drive: 6 plays, 75 yards, 2:26.
- SC – Nick Berrett 17-yard fumble return (William Joyce kick), 0:00. Gamecocks 17–3.

Second quarter

- SC – William Joyce 41-yard field goal, 9:32. Gamecocks 20–3. Drive: 8 plays, 66 yards, 4:05.
- SC – Nyck Harbor 80-yard pass from LaNorris Sellers (Mason Love kick), 0:53. Gamecocks 27–3. Drive: 1 play, 80 yards, 0:13.
- SC – William Joyce 35-yard field goal, 0:02. Gamecocks 30–3. Drive: 3 plays, 6 yards, 0:31.

Third quarter

- TA&M – Izaiah Williams 27-yard pass from Marcel Reed (Randy Bond kick), 11:26. Gamecocks 30–10. Drive: 8 plays, 35 yards, 3:28.
- TA&M – Ashton Bethel-Roman 39-yard pass from Marcel Reed (Randy Bond kick), 4:18. Gamecocks 30–17. Drive: 7 plays, 70 yards, 2:55.
- TA&M – Nate Boerkircher 14-yard pass from Marcel Reed (Randy Bond kick), 2:04. Gamecocks 30–24. Drive: 2 plays, 80 yards, 0:38.

Fourth quarter

- TA&M – EJ Smith 4-yard run (Randy Bond kick), 10:47. Aggies 31–30. Drive: 10 plays, 98 yards, 4:13.

Statistics	SC	TA&M
First downs	15	23
Plays–yards	64–388	68–503
Rushes–yards	33–121	29–64
Passing yards	267	439
Passing: comp–att–int	16–31–1	22–39–2
Turnovers	1	4
Time of possession	29:44	30:16

Team	Category	Player	Statistics
South Carolina	Passing	LaNorris Sellers	15/30, 246 yards, TD, INT
South Carolina	Rushing	Jawarn Howell	3 carries, 30 yards
South Carolina	Receiving	Nyck Harbor	3 receptions, 102 yards, TD
Texas A&M	Passing	Marcel Reed	22/39, 439 yards, 3 TD, 2 INT
Texas A&M	Rushing	Rueben Owens II	8 carries, 28 yards
Texas A&M	Receiving	KC Concepcion	7 receptions, 158 yards

=== vs Samford (FCS) ===
Samford Bulldogs (FCS) (1–10) at No. 3 Texas A&M Aggies (10–0) – Game summary

Quarter	1	2	3	4	Total
Bulldogs (FCS)	0	0	0	0	0
No. 3 Aggies	21	10	7	10	48

at Kyle Field • College Station, TX

- Date: November 22
- Game time: 11:00 a.m.
- Game weather: Sunny • Temperature: 69 °F (21 °C) • Wind: N at 9 miles per hour (14 km/h)
- Game attendance: 104,877
- Referee: Tim Baker
- TV announcers (SECN+/ESPN+): Clay Matvick, Chase Daniel and Marilyn Payne
- Box score, Recap

Game information

First quarter

- TA&M – Ashton Bethel-Roman 3-yard pass from Marcel Reed (Jared Zirkel Kick), 11:34. Aggies 7–0. Drive: 7 plays, 70 yards, 3:24
- TA&M – KC Concepcion 6-yard pass from Marcel Reed (Jared Zirkel Kick), 3:53. Aggies 14–0. Drive: 11 plays, 49 yards, 4:43
- TA&M – Ashton Bethel-Roman 58-yard pass from Marcel Reed (Jared Zirkel Kick), 0:06. Aggies 21–0. Drive: 4 plays, 79 yards, 1:32

Second quarter

- TA&M – Amari Daniels 1-yard run (Jared Zirkel Kick), 12:19. Aggies 28–0. Drive: 4 plays, 64 yards, 1:41
- TA&M – Jared Zirkel 25-yard field goal, 0:02. Aggies 31–0. Drive: 7 plays, 40 yards, 0:45

Third quarter

- TA&M – Tiger Riden Jr. 1-yard Rrn (Jared Zirkel Kick), 8:28. Aggies 38–0. Drive: 11 plays, 59 yards, 5:09

Fourth quarter

- TA&M – Jared Zirkel 39-yard field goal, 14:55. Aggies 41–0. Drive: 7 plays, 12 yards, 3:31
- TA&M – Preston Landis 2-yard run (Jared Zirkel Kick), 5:50. Aggies 48–0. Drive: 10 plays, 50 yards, 4:32

Statistics	SAM	TA&M
First downs	3	22
Plays–yards	48–77	80–475
Rushes–yards	31–31	43–247
Passing yards	46	228
Passing: comp–att–int	7–17–0	20–37–1
Turnovers	0	2
Time of possession	26:56	33:04

Team	Category	Player	Statistics
Samford	Passing	Quincy Crittendon	7/16, 46 yards
Samford	Rushing	Ken Cherry	10 carries, 9 yards
Samford	Receiving	Preston Bird	1 reception, 27 yards
Texas A&M	Passing	Marcel Reed	10/15, 120 yards, 3 TD
Texas A&M	Rushing	Amari Daniels	9 carries, 106 yards, TD
Texas A&M	Receiving	Ashton Bethel-Roman	2 receptions, 61 yards, 2 TD

=== at No. 16 Texas (rivalry) ===
No. 3 Texas A&M Aggies (11–0) at No. 16 Texas Longhorns (8–3) – Game summary

Quarter	1	2	3	4	Total
No. 3 Aggies	0	10	0	7	17
No. 16 Longhorns	0	3	10	14	27

at Darrell K Royal–Texas Memorial Stadium • Austin, TX

- Date: November 28
- Game time: 6:30 p.m.
- Game weather: Cloudy • Temperature: 64 °F (18 °C)
- Game attendance: 103,632
- Referee: Steve Marlowe
- TV announcers (ABC): Sean McDonough, Greg McElroy, and Molly McGrath
- Box score, Recap

Game information

First quarter

- No scoring plays.

Second quarter

- (12:04) TEX – Mason Shipley 41-yard field goal (Drive: 14 plays, 57 yards, 4:42; Texas 3–0)
- (6:41) TA&M – Jared Zirkel 31-yard field goal (Drive: 9 plays, 62 yards, 5:18; Texas 3–3)
- (0:56) TA&M – K.C. Concepcion 8-yard run (Jared Zirkel kick) (Drive: 9 plays, 42 yards, 4:15; Texas A&M 10–3)

Third quarter

- (11:56) TEX – Mason Shipley 46-yard field goal (Drive: 5 plays, 50 yards, 1:54; Texas A&M 10–6)
- (7:12) TEX – Ryan Wingo 29-yard pass from Arch Manning (Mason Shipley kick) (Drive: 6 plays, 70 yards, 3:04; Texas 13–10)

Fourth quarter

- (14:57) TEX – Nick Townsend 2-yard run (Mason Shipley kick) (Drive: 6 plays, 83 yards, 3:14; Texas 20–10)
- (9:15) TA&M – E.J. Smith 13-yard run (Jared Zirkel kick) (Drive: 6 plays, 59 yards, 1:37; Texas 20–17)
- (7:04) TEX – Arch Manning 35-yard run (Mason Shipley kick) (Drive: 4 plays, 63 yards, 2:03; Texas 27–17)

Statistics	TA&M	TEX
First downs	19	19
Plays–yards	70–337	74–397
Rushes–yards	34–157	35–218
Passing yards	180	179
Passing: comp–att–int	20–32–2	14–31–0
Turnovers	2	0
Total yards	337	397
Time of possession	32:15	27:45

Team	Category	Player	Statistics
Texas A&M	Passing	Marcel Reed	20–32, 180 yards, 2 INT
Texas A&M	Rushing	Marcel Reed	12 carries, 71 yards
Texas A&M	Receiving	KC Concepcion	5 receptions, 57 yards
Texas	Passing	Arch Manning	14–31, 179 yards, TD
Texas	Rushing	Quintrevion Wisner	19 carries, 155 yards
Texas	Receiving	Jack Endries	4 receptions, 93 yards

=== vs No. 10 Miami (FL) (College Football Playoff – First Round) ===
CFP First Round Game
No. 10 Miami Hurricanes (10–2) at No. 7 Texas A&M Aggies (11–1) — Game summary

Quarter	1	2	3	4	Total
No. 10 Hurricanes	0	0	3	7	10
No. 7 Aggies	0	0	0	3	3

at Kyle Field • College Station, TX

- Date: December 20
- Game time: 12:00 p.m.
- Game weather: Sunny • Temperature: 68 °F (20 °C) • Wind: SW at 14 miles per hour (23 km/h)
- Game attendance: 104,122
- Referee: Michael VanderVelde (Big 12)
- TV announcers (ABC/ESPN): Sean McDonough, Greg McElroy, Molly McGrath and Taylor McGregor
- Box score, Recap

Game information

First quarter

- No scoring plays.

Second quarter

- No scoring plays.

Third quarter

- MIA – Carter Davis 21-yard field goal, 10:34. Hurricanes 3–0. Drive: 9 plays, 72 yards, 4:26.

Fourth quarter

- TA&M – Randy Bond 35-yard field goal, 8:03. Tied 3–3. Drive: 16 plays, 67 yards, 7:30.
- MIA – Malachi Toney 11-yard pass from Carson Beck (Carter Davis kick), 1:49. Hurricanes 10–3. Drive: 6 plays, 86 yards, 2:18.

Statistics	MIA	TA&M
First downs	12	21
Plays–yards	49–278	75–326
Rushes–yards	28–175	35–89
Passing yards	103	237
Passing: Comp–Att–Int	14–21–0	25–40–2
Turnovers	1	3
Time of possession	26:16	33:44

Team	Category	Player	Statistics
Miami	Passing	Carson Beck	14/20, 103 yards, TD
Miami	Rushing	Mark Fletcher Jr.	17 carries, 172 yards
Miami	Receiving	Keelan Marion	3 receptions, 33 yards
Texas A&M	Passing	Marcel Reed	25/39, 237 yards, 2 INT
Texas A&M	Rushing	Marcel Reed	15 carries, 27 yards
Texas A&M	Receiving	Mario Craver	7 receptions, 92 yards
