= 2024 Texas A&M Aggies football team =

American college football season

2024 Texas A&M Aggies football

Las Vegas Bowl, L 31–35 vs. USC
- Conference: Southeastern Conference
- Record: 8–5 (5–3 SEC)
- Head coach: Mike Elko (1st season)
- Offensive coordinator: Collin Klein (1st season)
- Co-offensive coordinator: Holmon Wiggins (1st season)
- Offensive scheme: Pro spread
- Defensive coordinator: Jay Bateman (1st season)
- Co-defensive coordinator: Jordan Peterson (1st season)
- Base defense: 4–2–5
- Home stadium: Kyle Field

2024 Southeastern Conference football standings
	Conf.			Overall
Team	W		L	W		L
No. 4 Texas y^	7	–	1	13	–	3
No. 6 Georgia y$^	6	–	2	11	–	3
No. 9 Tennessee ^	6	–	2	10	–	3
No. 22 Missouri	5	–	3	10	–	3
No. 11 Ole Miss	5	–	3	10	–	3
No. 17 Alabama	5	–	3	9	–	4
No. 19 South Carolina	5	–	3	9	–	4
LSU	5	–	3	9	–	4
Texas A&M	5	–	3	8	–	5
Florida	4	–	4	8	–	5
Arkansas	3	–	5	7	–	6
Vanderbilt	3	–	5	7	–	6
Oklahoma	2	–	6	6	–	7
Auburn	2	–	6	5	–	7
Kentucky	1	–	7	4	–	8
Mississippi State	0	–	8	2	–	10
Championship: Georgia 22, Texas 19 ^{OT}
^ – College Football Playoff participant; $ – Conference champion; y – Championship game participant; Rankings from AP Poll

The 2024 Texas A&M Aggies football team represented Texas A&M University during the 2024 NCAA Division I FBS football season. The Aggies played their home games at Kyle Field located in College Station, Texas, and competed as members of the Southeastern Conference (SEC). They were led by Mike Elko in his first year as the team's head coach.

== Preseason ==
The SEC media poll was released on July 19, 2024. The Aggies were predicted to finish ninth in the conference.

Predicted finish	Team	Votes (1st place)
1	Georgia	3330 (165)
2	Texas	3041 (27)
3	Alabama	2891 (12)
4	Ole Miss	2783 (4)
5	LSU	2322 (2)
6	Missouri	2240
7	Tennessee	2168
8	Oklahoma	2022
9	Texas A&M	1684
10	Auburn	1382
11	Kentucky	1371
12	Florida	1146
13	South Carolina	923 (1)
14	Arkansas	749
15	Mississippi State	623
16	Vanderbilt	293 (2)

First-place votes
Rank	Team	Votes
1	Georgia	165
2	Texas	27
3	Alabama	12
4	Ole Miss	4
5	LSU	2
6	Vanderbilt	2
7	South Carolina	1

== Schedule ==
Date	Time	Opponent	Rank	Site	TV	Result	Attendance
August 31	6:30 p.m.	No. 7 Notre Dame*	No. 20	Kyle Field; College Station, TX (College GameDay)	ABC	L 13–23	107,315
September 7	11:45 a.m.	McNeese*		Kyle Field; College Station, TX	SECN	W 52–10	92,345
September 14	2:30 p.m.	at Florida		Ben Hill Griffin Stadium; Gainesville, FL (SEC Nation)	ABC	W 33–20	89,993
September 21	6:30 p.m.	Bowling Green*	No. 25	Kyle Field; College Station, TX	SECN+/ESPN+	W 26–20	99,523
September 28	2:30 p.m.	vs. Arkansas	No. 24	AT&T Stadium; Arlington, TX (Southwest Classic)	ESPN	W 21–17	60,928
October 5	11:00 a.m.	No. 9 Missouri	No. 25	Kyle Field; College Station, TX (SEC Nation)	ABC	W 41–10	97,049
October 19	3:15 p.m.	at Mississippi State	No. 14	Davis Wade Stadium; Starkville, MS	SECN	W 34–24	50,127
October 26	6:30 p.m.	No. 8 LSU	No. 14	Kyle Field; College Station, TX (rivalry)	ABC	W 38–23	108,852
November 2	6:30 p.m.	at South Carolina	No. 10	Williams–Brice Stadium; Columbia, SC	ABC	L 20–44	80,298
November 16	6:45 p.m.	New Mexico State*	No. 15	Kyle Field; College Station, TX	SECN	W 38–3	105,815
November 23	6:30 p.m.	at Auburn	No. 15	Jordan-Hare Stadium; Auburn, AL	ESPN	L 41–43 ^{4OT}	88,043
November 30	6:30 p.m.	No. 3 Texas	No. 20	Kyle Field; College Station, TX (Lone Star Showdown, College GameDay)	ABC	L 7–17	109,028
December 27	9:30 p.m.	vs. USC*		Allegiant Stadium; Paradise, NV (Las Vegas Bowl)	ESPN	L 31–35	26,671
*Non-conference game; Rankings from AP Poll (and CFP Rankings, after November 5) - Released prior to game; All times are in Central time

== Rankings ==
Ranking movements Legend: ██ Increase in ranking ██ Decrease in ranking — = Not ranked RV = Received votes т = Tied with team above or below
	Week																
Poll	Pre	1	2	3	4	5	6	7	8	9	10	11	12	13	14	15	Final
AP	20	RV	RV	25	24	25т	15	14	14	10	15	15	15	20	RV	RV	RV
Coaches	20	RV	RV	24	24	21	14	14	14	11	16	15	14	19	RV	RV	RV
CFP	Not released										14	15	15	20	—	—	Not released

== Personnel ==
2024 Texas A&M Aggies football team roster
Players
Coaches
Offense

Pos.	#	Name	Class
WR	0	Izaiah Williams	Fr
WR	1	Jabre Barber	Sr
RB	2	Rueben Owens	So
WR	2	Terry Bussey	Fr
WR	3	Noah Thomas	Jr
WR	4	Micah Tease	So
RB	5	Amari Daniels	Jr
WR	6	Cyrus Allen	Jr
WR	7	Moose Muhammad III	GS
RB	8	Le'Veon Moss	Jr
WR	9	Jahdae Walker	Sr
QB	10	Marcel Reed	Fr
WR	11	Jacob Bostick	So
QB	13	Jaylen Henderson	Jr
QB	14	Blake Bost	Sr
QB	15	Conner Weigman	So
QB	16	Miles O'Neil	Fr
TE	17	Theo Melin Öhrström	So
TE	18	Donovan Green	So
QB	19	Paxton Land	Fr
WR	20	Johnny Ryder	So
QB	21	Dallas Novicke	So
RB	22	E. J. Smith	GS
WR	23	Ernest Campbell	Fr
RB	24	Ramarian Tillman	Fr
RB	27	Ronnie Crosby III	Fr
RB	28	Israel Benjamin	GS
QB	29	Dylan Mayers	Fr
RB	34	Preston Landis	So
QB	37	Peyton Gay	Fr
WR	39	Sam Salz	Sr
RB	41	A. J. DiNota	Jr
TE	43	Carter Braugh	Fr
TE	43	Zachary Clay	Jr
OL	50	Isendre Ahfua	Fr
OL	52	Blake Ivy	Fr
OL	54	Mark Nabou Jr.	So
OL	55	Ar'maj Reed-Adams	Jr
OL	57	Bryce Barnes	Sr
OL	58	William Huntsinger	Jr
OL	59	Ty Banco	Fr
OL	60	Trey Zuhn III	Jr
OL	61	Kolinu'u Faaiu	Jr
OL	62	Collin Strittmatter	So
OL	63	Chance Jackson	So
OL	64	Samuel Thornton	Fr
OL	66	Hunter Erb	So
OL	67	T. J. Shanahan	Fr
OL	68	Kyle Garvis	Fr
OL	69	Brady Stephenson	Fr
OL	70	Robert Bourdon	Fr
OL	71	Chase Bisontis	So
OL	73	Ashton Funk	Fr
OL	74	Aki Ogunbiyi	Jr
OL	75	Kam Dewberry	Jr
OL	76	Reuben Fatheree II	Sr
OL	78	Dametrious Crownover	Jr
WR	80	Wesley Watson	Fr
TE	81	Luke Braden	Fr
TE	82	Shane Calhoun	GS
WR	83	Andrew Maleski	So
WR	84	Blake Buntyn	Fr
TE	84	Tre Watson	Sr
WR	85	Chase Burton	Fr
TE	85	Jaden Platt	Fr
WR	86	Ryan Burtin	Fr
WR	87	Ashton Bethel-Roman	Fr
WR	87	Jacob Brasher	So
TE	88	Garrett Miller	GS
TE	89	Nathan Figueroa	So

Defense

Pos.	#	Name	Class
LB	0	Scooby Williams	Jr
DB	1	Bryce Anderson	Jr
DB	3	Marcus Ratcliffe	So
DL	4	Shemar Stewart	Jr
DL	5	Shemar Turner	Sr
DL	6	Enai White	Jr
DB	7	Tyreek Chappell	Sr
DB	8	Jaydon Hill	GS
DB	9	Trey Jones III	GS
DB	10	Dezz Ricks	Fr
DL	11	Nic Scourton	Jr
DL	12	Nana Boadi-Owusu	So
DL	13	D. J. Hicks	So
DB	14	Jayvon Thomas	So
DL	15	Rylan Kennedy	So
DL	17	Albert Regis	Jr
DL	18	Cashius Howell	Jr
DB	19	Bravion Rogers	So
DB	20	B. J. Mayes	So
LB	21	Taurean York	So
LB	22	Solomon DeShields	Sr
LB	23	Chantz Johnson	So
DB	24	Donovan Saunders	Jr
DB	25	Dalton Brooks	So
DB	26	Dashawn Fillmore	Jr
DB	26	Layne Gerke	Fr
DB	26	Will Lee III	Jr
LB	27	Daymion Sanford	So
DB	28	Jordan Pride	Fr
DB	29	Myles Davis	Fr
DB	30	J. R. Rosenberg	Fr
DL	30	Solomon Williams	Fr
DB	31	Caleb Surber	Jr
LB	32	Tristan Jernigan	Fr
DB	32	Aaron Trevino	So
DB	33	Jarred Kerr	Jr
DB	35	Sawyer Bolli	Fr
DB	35	Isaiah Willis	So
DB	36	Kyle Walsh	So
DB	38	Benjamin Bruce	Fr
DB	39	Adam Graham	Fr
LB	40	Martrell Harris Jr.	Jr
DL	42	Kendall Jackson	Fr
LB	45	Jordan Lockhart	Fr
LB	46	Aidan Herrera	So
DL	53	Jadon Scarlett	So
LB	54	Danny Lockhart Jr.	Sr
DL	55	Dealyn Evans	Fr
DL	56	Rodas Johnson	GS
DL	87	Cody Polk	So
DL	88	Samu Taumanupepe	Fr
LB	91	Tommy Colligan	Fr
DL	92	Malick Sylla	Jr
DL	93	Drew Beltran	Jr
DL	94	Josh Celiscar	GS
DL	95	Charlie Shears	Fr
DL	96	Nathan Jackson	Jr
DL	97	Alessandro Perez	Fr
DL	98	Jesse Chukwu	So
DL	99	Gabriel Brownlow-Dindy	So

Special teams

Pos.	#	Name	Class
P	33	Keegan Andrews	Jr
P	36	Truette Tumey	Jr
P	37	Tyler White	Fr
K	38	Eli Krozel	Jr
K	41	Liam Padron	Fr
LS	42	Jackson Graham	Fr
LS	45	Levi Hancock	So
K	47	Randy Bond	GS
LS	48	Jacob Graham	GS
LS	49	Connor Able	Jr
K	94	Drake Bhatia	Sr
K	99	Jared Zirkel	Sr

Head coach

- Mike Elko

Coordinators/assistant coaches

- Trooper Taylor – Associate head coach/running backs
- Jay Bateman –Defensive coordinator/linebackers
- Collin Klein – Offensive coordinator/quarterbacks
- Jordan Peterson – Co-defensive coordinator/defensive backs
- Holmon Wiggins – Co-offensive coordinator/wide receivers
- Patrick Dougherty – Special teams coordinator
- Ishmael Aristide – Defensive backs
- Adam Cushing – Run game coordinator/offensive linemen
- Tony Jerod-Eddie – Defensive linemen
- Sean Spencer – Defensive linemen
- Josh Buford – Offensive analyst
- Wisly Desire – Offensive analyst
- Christian Ellsworth – Offensive analyst
- Joey Lynch – Offensive analyst
- Deveonte Mackey – Offensive analyst
- Alex Garwig – Defensive analyst
- Bryant Gross-Armiento – Defensive analyst
- Kyle Hoke – Defensive analyst
- Preston Mason – Defensive analyst
- Stan Watson – Defensive analyst
- Keith Larson – Special teams analyst
- Malik Davis – Graduate assistant
- Trey Odom – Graduate assistant
- Gavin Spurrier – Graduate assistant
- Isaiah Washington – Graduate assistant

Legend

- (C) Team captain
- (S) Suspended
- (I) Ineligible
- Injured
- Redshirt

Roster
Last update: 12/8/24

=== Coaching staff ===
Name	Position	Season at Texas A&M	Previous Position
Mike Elko	Head coach	1st	Duke, HC
Collin Klein	Offensive coordinator and quarterbacks coach	1st	Kansas State, OC
Holmon Wiggins	Co-offensive coordinator and wide receivers coach	1st	Alabama, WR coach
Trooper Taylor	Associate head coach and running backs coach	1st	Duke, RB coach
Adam Cushing	Offensive line coach and run game coordinator	1st	Duke, OL coach
Patrick Dougherty	Special teams coordinator	1st	Duke, ST coordinator
Jay Bateman	Defensive coordinator and linebackers coach	1st	Florida, ILB coach
Jordan Peterson	Co-defensive coordinator and defensive backs coach	1st	Kansas, Co-DC
Ishmael Aristide	Defensive backs coach	1st	Duke, DB coach
Tony Jerod-Eddie	Defensive line coach	2nd	Texas A&M, Defensive assistant
Sean Spencer	Defensive line coach	1st	Florida, DL coach
Tommy Moffitt	Strength and conditioning coach	1st	LSU, S&C coach

== Game summaries ==
=== No. 7 Notre Dame ===
No. 7 Notre Dame Fighting Irish at No. 20 Texas A&M Aggies – Game summary

Quarter	1	2	3	4	Total
No. 7 Fighting Irish	3	3	7	10	23
No. 20 Aggies	3	3	0	7	13

at Kyle Field, College Station, Texas

- Date: August 31
- Game time: 6:30 p.m. CDT
- Game weather: Sunny, 90 °F (32 °C)
- Game attendance: 107,315
- Referee: Adam Savoie
- TV announcers (ABC): Chris Fowler, Kirk Herbstreit, and Holly Rowe
- Box score, Recap

Game information
First quarter
- TAMU – Randy Bond 34-yard field goal, 11:07. Aggies 3–0. Drive: 10 plays, 58 yards, 3:53.
- ND – Mitch Jeter 46-yard field goal, 6:39. Tied 3–3. Drive: 9 plays, 47 yards, 4:28.

Second quarter

- TAMU – Randy Bond 49-yard field goal, 14:14. Aggies 6–3. Drive: 8 plays, 31 yards, 3:45.
- ND – Mitch Jeter 26-yard field goal, 8:32. Tied 6–6. Drive: 7 plays, 21 yards, 2:35.

Third quarter

- ND – Jadarian Price 47-yard run (Mitch Jeter kick), 6:50. Fighting Irish 13–6. Drive: 4 plays, 63 yards, 2:05.

Fourth quarter

- TAMU – Le'Veon Moss 1-yard run (Randy Bond kick), 11:49. Tied 13–13. Drive: 10 plays, 65 yards, 3:43.
- ND – Jeremiyah Love 21-yard run (Mitch Jeter kick), 1:54. Fighting Irish 20–13. Drive: 8 plays, 85 yards, 4:29.
- ND – Mitch Jeter 46-yard field goal, 0:30. Fighting Irish 23–13. Drive: 4 plays, 5 yards, 1:04.

Statistics	ND	TAMU
First downs	18	17
Total yards	356	246
Rushing yards	198	146
Passing yards	158	100
Turnovers	0	2
Time of possession	31:35	28:25

Team	Category	Player	Statistics
Notre Dame	Passing	Riley Leonard	18/30, 158 yards
Notre Dame	Rushing	Jeremiyah Love	14 rushes, 91 yards, TD
Notre Dame	Receiving	Beaux Collins	5 receptions, 62 yards
Texas A&M	Passing	Conner Weigman	12/30, 100 yards, 2 INT
Texas A&M	Rushing	Le'Veon Moss	20 rushes, 70 yards, TD
Texas A&M	Receiving	Jahdae Walker	6 receptions, 31 yards

=== McNeese ===
McNeese Cowboys at Texas A&M Aggies – Game summary

Quarter	1	2	3	4	Total
Cowboys	0	0	0	10	10
Aggies	14	24	7	7	52

at Kyle Field, College Station, Texas

- Date: September 7
- Game time: 11:45 a.m. CDT
- Game weather: Sunny, 82 °F (28 °C)
- Game attendance: 92,345
- Referee: Wayne Winkler
- TV announcers (SECN): Taylor Zarzour, Matt Stinchcomb, and Alyssa Lang
- Box score, Recap

Game information
First quarter
- TAMU – La'Veon Moss 2-yard run (Randy Bond kick), 12:44. Aggies 7–0. Drive: 5 plays, 75 yards, 2:16.
- TAMU – Amari Daniels 2-yard run (Randy Bond kick), 7:19. Aggies 14–0. Drive: 6 plays, 46 yards, 4:11.

Second quarter

- TAMU – La'Veon Moss 6-yard run (Randy Bond kick), 14:20. Aggies 21–0. Drive: 10 plays, 73 yards, 4:33.
- TAMU – Noah Thomas 15-yard pass from Conner Weigman (Randy Bond kick), 10:27. Aggies 28–0. Drive: 7 plays, 35 yards, 3:04.
- TAMU – Moose Muhammad III 3-yard pass from Conner Weigman (Randy Bond kick), 4:36. Aggies 35–0. Drive: 8 plays, 80 yards, 3:50.
- TAMU – Randy Bond 42-yard field goal, 0:44. Aggies 38–0. Drive: 5 plays, 15 yards, 1:46.

Third quarter

- TAMU – Amari Daniels 7-yard run (Randy Bond kick), 5:55. Aggies 45–0. Drive: 10 plays, 92 yards, 4:47.

Fourth quarter

- MCN – Jalen Wright 10-yard pass from Kamden Sixkiller (Tyler Larco kick), 10:25. Aggies 45–7. Drive: 19 plays, 75 yards, 10:30.
- TAMU – Terry Bussey 65-yard run (Randy Bond kick), 10:06. Aggies 52–7. Drive: 1 play, 65 yards, 0:13.
- MCN – Tyler Larco 26-yard field goal, 0:00. Aggies 52–10. Drive: 11 plays, 89 yards, 4:20.

Statistics	MCN	TAMU
First downs	14	29
Total yards	279	529
Rushing yards	180	333
Passing yards	99	196
Turnovers	2	0
Time of possession	30:23	29:37

Team	Category	Player	Statistics
McNeese	Passing	Kamden Sixkiller	9/19, 80 yards, TD, 2 INT
McNeese	Rushing	Bryce Strong	6 rushes, 64 yards
McNeese	Receiving	Jer'Michael Carter	2 receptions, 23 yards
Texas A&M	Passing	Conner Weigman	11/14, 125 yards, 2 TD
Texas A&M	Rushing	Le'Veon Moss	9 rushes, 84 yards, 2 TD
Texas A&M	Receiving	Cyrus Allen	5 receptions, 72 yards

=== At Florida ===
Texas A&M Aggies at Florida Gators – Game summary

Quarter	1	2	3	4	Total
Aggies	10	10	13	0	33
Gators	0	0	14	6	20

at Ben Hill Griffin Stadium, Gainesville, Florida

- Date: September 14
- Game time: 2:30 p.m. CDT/3:30 p.m. EDT
- Game weather: Sunny
- Game attendance: 89,993
- Referee: Steve Marlowe
- TV announcers (ABC): Joe Tessitore, Jesse Palmer, and Katie George
- Box score, Recap

Game information
First quarter
- TAMU – Randy Bond 31-yard field goal, 8:14. Aggies 3–0. Drive: 14 plays, 62 yards, 6:46.
- TAMU – Theo Melin Ohrstrom 29-yard pass from Marcel Reed (Randy Bond kick), 0:18. Aggies 10–0. Drive: 9 plays, 92 yards, 5:10.

Second quarter

- TAMU – Randy Bond 48-yard field goal, 9:47. Aggies 13–0. Drive: 9 plays, 24 yards, 3:34.
- TAMU – Marcel Reed 1-yard run (Randy Bond kick), 0:44. Aggies 20–0. Drive: 15 plays, 99 yards, 7:23.

Third quarter

- FLA – Elijhah Badger 14-yard pass from Graham Mertz (Trey Smack kick), 11:49. Aggies 20–7. Drive: 7 plays, 75 yards, 3:11.
- TAMU – Cyrus Allen 73-yard pass from Marcel Reed (run failed), 11:00. Aggies 26–7. Drive: 2 plays, 75 yards, 0:49.
- TAMU – Bryce Anderson 45-yard interception return (Randy Bond kick), 5:29. Aggies 33–7.
- FLA – Chimere Dike 7-yard pass from D. J. Lagway (Trey Smack kick), 1:04. Aggies 33–14. Drive: 10 plays, 72 yards, 4:25.

Fourth quarter

- FLA – Ja'Kobi Jackson 2-yard run (pass failed), 5:13. Aggies 33–20. Drive: 9 plays, 78 yards, 3:15.

Statistics	TAMU	UF
First downs	27	19
Total yards	488	301
Rushing yards	310	52
Passing yards	178	249
Turnovers	0	3
Time of possession	37:37	22:23

Team	Category	Player	Statistics
Texas A&M	Passing	Marcel Reed	11/17, 178 yards, 2 TD
Texas A&M	Rushing	Le'Veon Moss	18 rushes, 110 yards
Texas A&M	Receiving	Cyrus Allen	3 receptions, 81 yards, TD
Florida	Passing	Graham Mertz	12/15, 195 yards, TD, INT
Florida	Rushing	Treyaun Webb	6 rushes, 37 yards
Florida	Receiving	Elijhah Badger	5 receptions, 94 yards, TD

=== Bowling Green ===
Bowling Green Falcons at No. 25 Texas A&M Aggies – Game summary

Quarter	1	2	3	4	Total
Falcons	0	3	14	3	20
No. 25 Aggies	7	6	7	6	26

at Kyle Field, College Station, Texas

- Date: September 21
- Game time: 6:30 p.m. CDT
- Game weather: Sunny, 93 °F (34 °C)
- Game attendance: 99,523
- Referee: David Smith
- TV announcers (SECN+/ESPN+): Jay Alter, Rocky Boiman, and Ashley Stroehlein
- Box score, Recap

Game information
First quarter
- TAMU – Theo Melin Ohrstrom 27-yard pass from Marcel Reed (Randy Bond kick), 10:04. Aggies 7–0. Drive: 11 plays, 75 yards, 4:56.

Second quarter

- BGSU – Jackson Kleather 33-yard field goal, 13:35. Aggies 7–3. Drive: 7 plays, 36 yards, 2:10.
- TAMU – Randy Bond 28-yard field goal, 10:17. Aggies 10–3. Drive: 7 plays, 33 yards, 2:28.
- TAMU – Randy Bond 29-yard field goal, 0:02. Aggies 13–3. Drive: 18 plays, 77 yards, 6:14.

Third quarter

- BGSU – Harold Fannin Jr. 65-yard pass from Connor Bazelak (Jackson Kleather kick), 14:48. Aggies 13–10. Drive: 1 play, 65 yards, 0:12.
- TAMU – Jahdae Walker 5-yard pass from Marcel Reed (Randy Bond kick), 10:43. Aggies 20–10. Drive: 8 plays, 75 yards, 4:05.
- BGSU – Rahkeem Smith 40-yard run (Jackson Kleather kick), 5:24. Aggies 20–17. Drive: 9 plays, 81 yards, 5:13.

Fourth quarter

- TAMU – Randy Bond 34-yard field goal, 12:56. Aggies 23–17. Drive: 12 plays, 64 yards, 4:01.
- TAMU – Randy Bond 42-yard field goal, 7:15. Aggies 26–17. Drive: 9 plays, 50 yards, 4:20.
- BGSU – Jackson Kleather 23-yard field goal, 0:38. Aggies 26–20. Drive: 6 plays, 30 yards, 0:54.

Statistics	BGSU	TAMU
First downs	17	21
Total yards	339	410
Rushing yards	89	237
Passing yards	250	173
Turnovers	1	1
Time of possession	26:26	33:34

Team	Category	Player	Statistics
Bowling Green	Passing	Connor Bazelak	20/36, 250 yards, TD, INT
Bowling Green	Rushing	Terion Stewart	13 rushes, 42 yards
Bowling Green	Receiving	Harold Fannin Jr.	8 receptions, 145 yards, TD
Texas A&M	Passing	Marcel Reed	16/29, 173 yards, 2 TD
Texas A&M	Rushing	Marcel Reed	12 rushes, 91 yards
Texas A&M	Receiving	Jahdae Walker	3 receptions, 45 yards, TD

=== Vs. Arkansas ===
Arkansas Razorbacks vs. No. 24 Texas A&M Aggies – Game summary

Quarter	1	2	3	4	Total
Razorbacks	14	0	0	3	17
No. 24 Aggies	7	7	0	7	21

at AT&T Stadium, Arlington, Texas

- Date: September 28
- Game time: 2:30 p.m. CDT
- Game weather: None (retractable roof closed)
- Game attendance: 60,928
- Referee: Lee Hedrick
- TV announcers (ESPN): Dave Pasch, Dusty Dvoracek, and Taylor McGregor
- Box score, Recap

Game information
First quarter
- ARK – Isaac TeSlaa 75-yard pass from Taylen Green (Kyle Ramsey kick), 13:49. Razorbacks 7–0. Drive: 3 plays, 75 yards, 1:11.
- TAMU – Noah Thomas 58-yard pass from Marcel Reed (Randy Bond kick), 10:28. Tied 7–7. Drive: 3 plays, 70 yards, 1:07.
- ARK – Ja'Quinden Jackson 8-yard run (Kyle Ramsey kick), 4:50. Razorbacks 14–7. Drive: 10 plays, 75 yards, 5:38.

Second quarter

- TAMU – Marcel Reed 5-yard run (Randy Bond kick), 8:58. Tied 14–14. Drive: 2 plays, 10 yards, 0:41.

Third quarter

- No scoring plays

Fourth quarter

- ARK – Kyle Ramsey 45-yard field goal, 13:24. Razorbacks 17–14. Drive: 10 plays, 58 yards, 4:12.
- TAMU – Tre Watson 5-yard pass from Marcel Reed (Randy Bond kick), 9:00. Aggies 21–17. Drive: 8 plays, 75 yards, 4:24.

Statistics	ARK	TAMU
First downs	22	17
Total yards	379	297
Rushing yards	100	134
Passing yards	279	163
Turnovers	3	0
Time of possession	30:39	29:21

Team	Category	Player	Statistics
Arkansas	Passing	Taylen Green	23/41, 279 yards, TD, INT
Arkansas	Rushing	Ja'Quinden Jackson	10 rushes, 37 yards, TD
Arkansas	Receiving	Isaac TeSlaa	5 receptions, 120 yards, TD
Texas A&M	Passing	Marcel Reed	11/22, 163 yards, 2 TD
Texas A&M	Rushing	Le'Veon Moss	13 rushes, 117 yards
Texas A&M	Receiving	Noah Thomas	6 receptions, 109 yards, TD

=== No. 9 Missouri ===
No. 9 Missouri Tigers at No. 25 Texas A&M Aggies – Game summary

Quarter	1	2	3	4	Total
No. 9 Tigers	0	0	7	3	10
No. 25 Aggies	10	14	10	7	41

at Kyle Field, College Station, Texas

- Date: October 5
- Game time: 11:00 a.m. CDT
- Game weather: Sunny, 80 °F (27 °C)
- Game attendance: 97,049
- Referee: Jeff Heaser
- TV announcers (ABC): Joe Tessitore, Jordan Rodgers, and Stormy Buonantony
- Box score, Recap

Game information
First quarter
- TAMU – Amari Daniels 1-yard run (Randy Bond kick), 9:17. Aggies 7–0. Drive: 8 plays, 60 yards, 3:38.
- TAMU – Randy Bond 44-yard field goal, 5:01. Aggies 10–0. Drive: 7 plays, 46 yards, 2:49.

Second quarter

- TAMU – Amari Daniels 1-yard run (Randy Bond kick), 14:27. Aggies 17–0. Drive: 8 plays, 65 yards, 4:21.
- TAMU – Le'Veon Moss 1-yard run (Randy Bond kick), 6:34. Aggies 24–0. Drive: 11 plays, 88 yards, 5:31.

Third quarter

- TAMU – Le'Veon Moss 75-yard run (Randy Bond kick), 14:47. Aggies 31–0. Drive: 1 play, 75 yards, 0:13.
- TAMU – Randy Bond 38-yard field goal, 6:30. Aggies 34–0. Drive: 8 plays, 40 yards, 6:44.
- MIZ – Theo Wease Jr. 59-yard pass from Brady Cook (Blake Craig kick), 5:06. Aggies 34–7. Drive: 5 plays, 77 yards, 1:24.

Fourth quarter

- TAMU – Le'Veon Moss 18-yard run (Randy Bond kick), 11:00. Aggies 41–7. Drive: 3 plays, 57 yards, 1:33.
- MIZ – Blake Craig 23-yard field goal, 0:08. Aggies 41–10. Drive: 17 plays, 74 yards, 5:59.

Statistics	MIZ	TAMU
First downs	13	20
Total yards	254	512
Rushing yards	68	236
Passing yards	186	276
Turnovers	0	0
Time of possession	26:47	33:13

Team	Category	Player	Statistics
Missouri	Passing	Brady Cook	13/31, 186 yards, TD
Missouri	Rushing	Nate Noel	10 rushes, 30 yards
Missouri	Receiving	Luther Burden III	7 receptions, 82 yards
Texas A&M	Passing	Conner Weigman	18/22, 276 yards
Texas A&M	Rushing	Le'Veon Moss	12 rushes, 138 yards, 3 TD
Texas A&M	Receiving	Terry Bussey	3 receptions, 76 yards

=== At Mississippi State ===
No.14 Texas A&M Aggies at Mississippi State Bulldogs – Game summary

Quarter	1	2	3	4	Total
No. 14 Aggies	7	14	10	3	34
Bulldogs	7	10	0	7	24

at Davis Wade Stadium, Starkville, Mississippi

- Date: October 19
- Game time: 3:15 p.m. CDT
- Game weather: Sunny, 74 °F (23 °C)
- Game attendance: 50,127
- Referee: Jason Autrey
- TV announcers (SECN): Taylor Zarzour, Matt Stinchcomb, and Ashley Stroehlein
- Box score, Recap

Game information
First quarter
- MSST – Davon Booth 14-yard pass from Michael Van Buren Jr. (Kyle Ferrie kick), 9:36. Bulldogs 7–0. Drive: 12 plays, 92 yards, 5:13.
- TAMU – Noah Thomas 20-yard pass from Conner Weigman (Randy Bond kick), 2:41. Tied 7–7. Drive: 13 plays, 74 yards, 6:49.

Second quarter

- TAMU – Le'Veon Moss 9-yard run (Randy Bond kick), 10:29. Aggies 14–7. Drive: 7 plays, 81 yards, 2:36.
- MSST – Kyle Ferrie 24-yard field goal, 6:30. Aggies 14–10. Drive: 9 plays, 69 yards, 3:59.
- TAMU – Amari Daniels 6-yard run (Randy Bond kick), 1:48. Aggies 21–10. Drive: 4 plays, 28 yards, 1:43.
- MSST – Mario Craver 4-yard pass from Michael Van Buren Jr. (Kyle Ferrie kick), 0:21. Aggies 21–17. Drive: 8 plays, 75 yards, 1:27.

Third quarter

- TAMU – Randy Bond 28-yard field goal, 7:10. Aggies 24–17. Drive: 17 plays, 64 yards, 7:50.
- TAMU – Le'Veon Moss 3-yard run (Randy Bond kick), 3:24. Aggies 31–17. Drive: 4 plays, 32 yards, 1:59.

Fourth quarter

- MSST – Kevin Coleman Jr. 12-yard pass from Michael Van Buren Jr. (Kyle Ferrie kick), 13:41. Aggies 31–24. Drive: 3 plays, 12 yards, 1:14.
- TAMU – Randy Bond 44-yard field goal, 6:13. Aggies 34–24. Drive: 7 plays, 41 yards, 3:42.

Statistics	TAMU	MSST
First downs	17	22
Total yards	353	367
Rushing yards	136	125
Passing yards	217	242
Turnovers	2	1
Time of possession	30:08	29:52

Team	Category	Player	Statistics
Texas A&M	Passing	Conner Weigman	15/25, 217 yards, TD, 2 INT
Texas A&M	Rushing	Le'Veon Moss	17 rushes, 65 yards, 2 TD
Texas A&M	Receiving	Jabre Barber	6 receptions, 92 yards
Mississippi State	Passing	Michael Van Buren Jr.	22/41, 242 yards, 3 TD, INT
Mississippi State	Rushing	Davon Booth	12 rushes, 79 yards
Mississippi State	Receiving	Kevin Coleman Jr.	8 receptions, 89 yards, TD

=== No. 8 LSU ===
No. 8 LSU Tigers at No. 14 Texas A&M Aggies – Game summary

Quarter	1	2	3	4	Total
No. 8 Tigers	10	7	0	6	23
No. 14 Aggies	7	0	14	17	38

at Kyle Field, College Station, Texas

- Date: October 26
- Game time: 6:30 p.m. CDT
- Game weather: Sunny, 87 °F (31 °C)
- Game attendance: 108,852
- Referee: Kyle Olson
- TV announcers (ABC): Chris Fowler, Kirk Herbstreit, and Holly Rowe
- Box score, Recap

Game information
First quarter
- LSU – Damian Ramos 23-yard field goal, 6:15. Tigers 3–0. Drive: 11 plays, 87 yards, 5:25.
- LSU – Mason Taylor 2-yard pass from Garrett Nussmeier (Damian Ramos kick), 3:51. Tigers 10–0. Drive: 4 plays, 21 yards, 1:30.
- TAMU – Le'Veon Moss 7-yard run (Randy Bond kick), 0:07. Tigers 10–7. Drive: 9 plays, 75 yards, 3:44.

Second quarter

- LSU – Aaron Anderson 76-yard pass from Garrett Nussmeier (Damian Ramos kick), 4:55. Tigers 17–7. Drive: 3 plays, 90 yards, 0:56.

Third quarter

- TAMU – Marcel Reed 8-yard run (Randy Bond kick), 8:10. Tigers 17–14. Drive: 1 play, 8 yards, 0:07.
- TAMU – Marcel Reed 8-yard run (Randy Bond kick), 1:00. Aggies 21–17. Drive: 7 plays, 60 yards, 3:53.

Fourth quarter

- TAMU – Marcel Reed 4-yard run (Randy Bond kick), 14:07. Aggies 28–17. Drive: 5 plays, 26 yards, 1:40.
- LSU – Garrett Nussmeier 1-yard run (pass failed), 9:57. Aggies 28–23. Drive: 9 plays, 78 yards, 4:10.
- TAMU – Le'Veon Moss 3-yard run (Randy Bond kick), 8:09. Aggies 35–23. Drive: 4 plays, 75 yards, 1:48.
- TAMU – Randy Bond 26-yard field goal, 3:44. Aggies 38–23. Drive: 6 plays, 29 yards, 2:47.

Statistics	LSU	TAMU
First downs	20	17
Total yards	429	376
Rushing yards	24	242
Passing yards	405	134
Turnovers	3	1
Time of possession	29:27	30:33

Team	Category	Player	Statistics
LSU	Passing	Garrett Nussmeier	25/50, 405 yards, 2 TD, 3 INT
LSU	Rushing	Josh Williams	7 rushes, 23 yards
LSU	Receiving	Aaron Anderson	3 receptions, 126 yards, TD
Texas A&M	Passing	Marcel Reed	2/2, 70 yards
Texas A&M	Rushing	Amari Daniels	12 rushes, 91 yards
Texas A&M	Receiving	Noah Thomas	1 reception, 54 yards

=== At South Carolina ===
No. 10 Texas A&M Aggies at South Carolina Gamecocks – Game summary

Quarter	1	2	3	4	Total
No. 10 Aggies	3	17	0	0	20
Gamecocks	14	6	10	14	44

at Williams–Brice Stadium, Columbia, South Carolina

- Date: November 2
- Game time: 6:30 p.m. CDT/7:30 p.m. EDT
- Game weather: Clear, 71 °F (22 °C)
- Game attendance: 80,298
- Referee: Steve Marlowe
- TV announcers (ABC): Sean McDonough, Greg McElroy, and Molly McGrath
- Box score, Recap

Game information
First quarter
- SCAR – LaNorris Sellers 23-yard run (Alex Herrera kick), 10:46. Gamecocks 7–0. Drive: 11 plays, 75 yards, 4:14.
- SCAR – Joshua Simon 15-yard pass from LaNorris Sellers (Alex Herrera kick), 8:24. Gamecocks 14–0. Drive: 2 plays, 34 yards, 0:47.
- TAMU – Randy Bond 52-yard field goal, 5:15. Gamecocks 14–3. Drive: 7 plays, 41 yards, 3:09.

Second quarter

- TAMU – Randy Bond 55-yard field goal, 13:12. Gamecocks 14–6. Drive: 8 plays, 42 yards, 2:46.
- SCAR – Alex Herrera 25-yard field goal, 8:45. Gamecocks 17–6. Drive: 10 plays, 68 yards, 4:27.
- TAMU – Amari Daniels 56-yard run (Randy Bond kick), 7:29. Gamecocks 17–13. Drive: 3 plays, 65 yards, 1:16.
- TAMU – Jabre Barber 2-yard pass from Marcel Reed (Randy Bond kick), 1:08. Aggies 20–17. Drive: 10 plays, 60 yards, 4:20.
- SCAR – Alex Herrera 44-yard field goal, 0:02. Tied 20–20. Drive: 6 plays, 49 yards, 1:06.

Third quarter

- SCAR – Raheim Sanders 52-yard run (Alex Herrera kick), 9:19. Gamecocks 27–20. Drive: 5 plays, 83 yards, 2:15.
- SCAR – Alex Herrera 43-yard field goal, 6:50. Gamecocks 30–20. Drive: 4 plays, 6 yards, 0:50.

Fourth quarter

- SCAR – Joshua Simon 57-yard pass from LaNorris Sellers (Alex Herrera kick), 3:24. Gamecocks 37–20. Drive: 5 plays, 85 yards, 1:48.
- SCAR – Raheim Sanders 7-yard run (Alex Herrera kick), 2:22. Gamecocks 44–20. Drive: 2 plays, 13 yards, 0:53.

Statistics	TAMU	SCAR
First downs	19	26
Total yards	350	530
Rushing yards	144	286
Passing yards	144	286
Turnovers	2	1
Time of possession	30:48	29:12

Team	Category	Player	Statistics
Texas A&M	Passing	Marcel Reed	18/28, 206 yards, TD, INT
Texas A&M	Rushing	Amari Daniels	13 rushes, 83 yards, TD
Texas A&M	Receiving	Jabre Barber	7 receptions, 80 yards, TD
South Carolina	Passing	LaNorris Sellers	13/27, 244 yards, 2 TD
South Carolina	Rushing	Raheim Sanders	20 rushes, 144 yards, 2 TD
South Carolina	Receiving	Joshua Simon	4 receptions, 132 yards, 2 TD

=== New Mexico State ===
New Mexico State Aggies at No. 15 Texas A&M Aggies – Game summary

Quarter	1	2	3	4	Total
NMSU Aggies	0	0	0	3	3
No. 15 TAMU Aggies	17	7	7	7	38

at Kyle Field, College Station, Texas

- Date: November 16
- Game time: 6:45 p.m. CST
- Game weather: Cloudy, 74 °F (23 °C)
- Game attendance: 105,815
- Referee: Matt Loeffler
- TV announcers (SECN): Dave Neal, Aaron Murray and Ashley ShahAhmadi
- Box score, Recap

Game information

First quarter

- TAMU – Noah Thomas 16-yard pass from Marcel Reed (Randy Bond kick), 11:38. Texas A&M 7–0. Drive: 8 plays, 75 yards, 3:22.
- TAMU – Amari Daniels 71-yard run (Randy Bond kick), 9:43. Texas A&M 14–0. Drive: 1 play, 71 yards, 0:14.
- TAMU – Randy Bond 37-yard field goal, 4:26. Texas A&M 17–0. Drive: 9 plays, 56 yards, 4:03.

Second quarter

- TAMU – Moose Muhammad III 6-yard pass from Marcel Reed (Randy Bond kick), 13:45. Texas A&M 24–0. Drive: 9 plays, 95 yards, 4:08.

Third quarter

- TAMU – Marcel Reed 5-yard run (Randy Bond kick), 6:36. Texas A&M 31–0. Drive: 14 plays, 76 yards, 6:38.

Fourth quarter

- NMSU – Abraham Montaño 48-yard field goal, 13:34. Texas A&M 31–3. Drive: 8 plays, 24 yards, 3:13.
- TAMU – Ashton Bethel-Roman 5-yard pass from Miles O'Neil (Drake Bhatia kick), 0:42. Texas A&M 38–3. Drive: 10 plays, 53 yards, 4:52.

Statistics	NMSU	TAMU
First downs	12	28
Total yards	214	565
Rushing yards	122	209
Passing yards	92	356
Turnovers	0	2
Time of possession	25:25	34:35

Team	Category	Player	Statistics
New Mexico State	Passing	Santino Marucci	6/19, 80 yards
New Mexico State	Rushing	Seth McGowan	14 carries, 75 yards
New Mexico State	Receiving	Mike Washington	2 receptions, 24 yards
Texas A&M	Passing	Marcel Reed	20/31, 268 yards, 2 TD, INT
Texas A&M	Rushing	Amari Daniels	5 carries, 84 yards, TD
Texas A&M	Receiving	Theo Melin Öhrström	5 receptions, 111 yards

=== At Auburn ===
No. 15 Texas A&M Aggies at Auburn Tigers – Game summary

Quarter	1	2	3	4	OT	2OT	3OT	4OT	Total
No. 15 Aggies	0	7	14	10	7	3	0	0	41
Tigers	14	7	7	3	7	3	0	2	43

at Jordan-Hare Stadium, Auburn, Alabama

- Date: November 23
- Game time: 6:30 p.m. CST
- Game weather: Clear, 50 °F (10 °C)
- Game attendance: 88,043
- Referee: Jason Autrey
- TV announcers (ESPN): Dave Flemming, Louis Riddick, and Kris Budden
- Box score, Recap

Game information
First quarter
- AUB – Jarquez Hunter 2-yard run (Ian Vachon kick), 11:22. Auburn 7–0. Drive: 10 plays, 65 yards, 3:33.
- AUB – Cam Coleman 63-yard pass from Payton Thorne (Ian Vachon kick), 6:05. Auburn 14–0. Drive: 2 plays, 64 yards, 0:38.

Second quarter

- AUB – Cam Coleman 15-yard pass from Payton Thorne (Ian Vachon kick), 13:09. Auburn 21–0. Drive: 6 plays, 88 yards, 2:59.
- TAMU – Terry Bussey 1-yard run (Randy Bond kick), 4:13. Auburn 21–7. Drive: 15 plays, 75 yards, 8:56.

Third quarter

- TAMU – Noah Thomas 14-yard pass from Marcel Reed (Randy Bond kick), 9:25. Auburn 21–14. Drive: 10 plays, 76 yards, 5:30.
- TAMU – Noah Thomas 73-yard pass from Marcel Reed (Randy Bond kick), 7:57. Tied 21–21. Drive: 1 play, 73 yards, 0:10.
- AUB – Jarquez Hunter 1-yard run (Ian Vachon kick), 2:27. Auburn 28–21. Drive: 4 plays, 55 yards, 1:36.

Fourth quarter

- TAMU – Randy Bond 32-yard field goal, 12:47. Auburn 28–24. Drive: 4 plays, yards, 1:29.
- TAMU – Amari Daniels 8-yard run (Randy Bond kick), 4:01. Texas A&M 31–28. Drive: 9 plays, 80 yards, 3:58.
- AUB – Ian Vachon 29-yard field goal, 0:05. Tied 31–31. Drive: 15 plays, 74 yards, 2:28.

First overtime

- TAMU – Jahdae Walker 12-yard pass from Marcel Reed (Randy Bond kick). Texas A&M 38–31. Drive: 5 plays, 25 yards.
- AUB – Jarquez Hunter 2-yard run (Ian Vachon kick). Tied 38–38. Drive: 4 plays, 25 yards.

Second overtime

- AUB – Ian Vachon 41-yard field goal. Auburn 41–38. Drive: 5 plays, 2 yards.
- TAMU – Randy Bond 42-yard field goal. Tied 41–41. Drive: 4 plays, 1 yard.

Third overtime

- No scoring plays

Fourth overtime

- AUB – KeAndre Lambert-Smith 2-point pass reception from Payton Thorne good. Auburn 43–41.

Statistics	TAMU	AUB
First downs	27	22
Total yards	464	469
Rushing yards	167	168
Passing yards	297	301
Turnovers	1	1
Time of possession	36:30	23:25

Team	Category	Player	Statistics
Texas A&M	Passing	Marcel Reed	22/35, 297 yards, 3 TD, INT
Texas A&M	Rushing	Amari Daniels	27 carries, 90 yards, TD
Texas A&M	Receiving	Jahdae Walker	7 receptions, 69 yards, TD
Auburn	Passing	Payton Thorne	19/31, 301 yards, 2 TD, INT
Auburn	Rushing	Jarquez Hunter	28 carries, 130 yards, 3 TD
Auburn	Receiving	Cam Coleman	7 receptions, 128 yards, 2 TD

=== No. 3 Texas ===
No. 3 Texas Longhorns at No. 20 Texas A&M Aggies – Game summary

Quarter	1	2	3	4	Total
No. 3 Longhorns	7	10	0	0	17
No. 20 Aggies	0	0	7	0	7

at Kyle Field, College Station, Texas

- Date: November 30
- Game time: 6:30 p.m. CST
- Game weather: Sunny, 58 °F (14 °C)
- Game attendance: 109,028
- Referee: David Smith
- TV announcers (ABC): Chris Fowler, Kirk Herbstreit, and Holly Rowe
- Box score, Recap

Game information
First quarter
- TEX – Arch Manning 15-yard run (Bert Auburn kick), 3:07. Longhorns 7–0. Drive: 10 plays, 93 yards, 4:41.

Second quarter

- TEX – Jaydon Blue 7-yard pass from Quinn Ewers (Bert Auburn kick), 8:19. Longhorns 14–0. Drive: 8 plays, 80 yards, 4:24.
- TEX – Bert Auburn 28-yard field goal, 1:50. Longhorns 17–0. Drive: 11 plays, 70 yards, 4:33.

Third quarter

- TAMU – Will Lee III 93-yard interception return (Randy Bond kick), 5:42. Longhorns 17–7.

Fourth quarter

- No scoring plays

Statistics	TEX	TAMU
First downs	26	15
Total yards	458	248
Rushing yards	240	102
Passing yards	218	146
Turnovers	2	2
Time of possession	34:43	25:17

Team	Category	Player	Statistics
Texas	Passing	Quinn Ewers	17/28, 218 yards, TD, INT
Texas	Rushing	Quintrevion Wisner	33 rushes, 186 yards
Texas	Receiving	Matthew Golden	3 receptions, 73 yards
Texas A&M	Passing	Marcel Reed	16/23, 146 yards, INT
Texas A&M	Rushing	Marcel Reed	14 rushes, 60 yards
Texas A&M	Receiving	Terry Bussey	2 receptions, 40 yards

=== USC (Las Vegas Bowl) ===
2024 SRS Distribution Las Vegas Bowl
USC Trojans (6–6) vs Texas A&M Aggies (8–4) – Game summary

Quarter	1	2	3	4	Total
Trojans	0	7	7	21	35
Aggies	7	0	17	7	31

at Allegiant Stadium • Paradise, Nevada

- Date: Friday, December 27, 2024
- Game time: 9:30 p.m. CST
- Game weather: Indoor
- Game attendance: 26,671
- Referee: Marcus Woods
- TV announcers (ESPN): Dave Flemming (play-by-play), Brock Osweiler (analyst), and Stormy Buonantony (sideline)

Game information
1st Quarter
- (6:40) TAMU - Noah Thomas 7-yard pass from Marcel Reed (Randy Reed kick) (Drive: 16 plays, 78 yards, 7:07; Texas A&M 7-0)

2nd Quarter

- (10:16) USC - Ja'Kobi Lane 30-yard pass from Jayden Maiava (Michael Lantz kick) (Drive: 8 plays, 74 yards, 3:36; Tied: 7-7)

3rd Quarter

- (11:03) TAMU - Noah Thomas 5-yard pass from Marcel Redd (Randy Reed kick) (Drive: 8 plays, 76 yards, 3:51; Texas A&M 14-7)
- (6:12) TAMU - Randy Bond 27-yard field goal (Drive: 8 plays, 74 yards, 3:55; Texas A&M 17-7)
- (5:12) TAMU - Jabre Barber 5-yard pass from Marcel Redd (Randy Bond kick) (Drive: 3 plays, 9 yards, 0:43; Texas A&M 24-7)
- (3:42) USC - Ja'Kobi Lane 17-yard pass from Jayden Maiava (Michael Lantz kick) (Drive: 3 plays, 71 yards, 1:26; Texas A&M 24-14)

4th Quarter

- (14:24) USC - Bryan Jackson 1-yard rush (Michael Lantz kick) (Drive: 8 plays, 66 yards, 2:51; Texas A&M 24-21)
- (4:30) USC - Ja'Kobi Lane 15-yard pass from Jaden Maiava (Michael Lantz kick) (Drive: 10 plays, 79 yards, 5:32; USC 28-24)
- (1:49) TAMU - Marcel Reed 19-yard rush (Randy Bond kick) (Drive: 7 plays, 75 yards, 2:41; Texas A&M 31-28)
- (0:08) USC - Kyle Ford 7-yard pass from Jayden Maiava (Michael Lantz kick) (Drive: 10 plays, 75 yards, 1:41; USC 35-31)

Statistics	USC	TAMU
First downs	25	24
Total yards	400	443
Rushing yards	105	151
Passing yards	295	292
Passing: Comp–Att–Int	22–39–3	26–42–2
Time of possession	28:07	31:53

Team	Category	Player	Statistics
USC	Passing	Jayden Maiava	22/39, 295 yards, 4 TD, 3 INT
USC	Rushing	Bryan Jackson	16 carries, 66 yards, TD
USC	Receiving	Ja'Kobi Lane	7 receptions, 127 yards, 3 TD
Texas A&M	Passing	Marcel Reed	26/42, 292 yards, 3 TD, 2 INT
Texas A&M	Rushing	Rueben Owens	13 carries, 56 yards
Texas A&M	Receiving	Jabre Barber	7 receptions, 48 yards, TD
