= Marcus Ratcliffe =

American football player (born 2005)

No. 3 – Texas A&M Aggies
- Position: Safety
- Class: Senior

Personal information
- Born: March 8, 2005 (age 21)
- Listed height: 6 ft 3 in (1.91 m)
- Listed weight: 211 lb (96 kg)

Career information
- High school: Cathedral Catholic (San Diego, California)
- College: San Diego State (2023); Texas A&M (2024–present)
- Stats at ESPN

Marcus Ratcliffe (born March 8, 2005) is an American college football safety for the Texas A&M Aggies. He previously played for the San Diego State Aztecs.

== Early life ==
Marcus Ratcliffe was born on March 8, 2005, to Gabe and Andrea Ratcliffe. He grew up in Chula Vista, California, where he played youth football with the Eastlake Panthers program. Ratcliffe attended Cathedral Catholic High School in San Diego, where he was a three-year letterwinner in football. He was a three-time all-league honoree on offense and a one-time all-league selection on defense, and helped the Dons win the Division 1-AA state championship in his junior season. As a senior, Ratcliffe recorded 21 tackles, one interception, and three pass breakups on defense to go along with one receiving touchdown and one kick return touchdown. He also earned letters in basketball and track and field.

=== Recruiting ===
Ratcliffe was rated as a consensus three-star recruit. On May 1, 2022, he committed to playing college football at San Diego State University (SDSU) over offers from Arizona, BYU, California, Colorado, Air Force, and Utah State. "I know it's early but I really didn't see any reason to wait", said Ratcliffe. "San Diego State fit all my needs and had everything I was looking for in a school." He signed with the Aztecs in December.

== College career ==
=== San Diego State ===
Ratcliffe joined the San Diego State Aztecs as an early enrollee and was a standout performer in spring practices. He entered fall camp in a competition with Max Garrison for the starting job at "Aztec" safety (Note: This is the signature position in the team's 3–3–5 defense, which it has used since 2009.) following the sudden transfer of incumbent starter Patrick McMorris. Ratcliffe was a starter in the team's first fall scrimmage, continuing to draw praise for his play. He was ultimately named the starter for the season opener against Ohio, becoming just the fifth SDSU defensive player to start as a true freshman since 2009 (and the first at the "Aztec" safety position). In the game, Ratcliffe seemingly returned an interception 100 yards for a touchdown, which would have tied the school record, but it was called off due to a penalty against his team. He later grabbed his first career interception to go with six tackles in a 33–18 win over Fresno State in the season finale, earning Mountain West Conference freshman of the week honors for his effort.

Ratcliffe started 11 of 12 games in the 2023 season, finishing with 51 tackles, one tackle for loss, one interception, and one pass breakup. He earned the team's Most Outstanding Defensive Freshman award. After the season, Ratcliffe entered the NCAA transfer portal. "I believe I can play Power Five, so that was the biggest factor," he said. "I want to compete at the highest level I can." Ratcliffe initially announced he was transferring to UCLA. However, it was later reported that he received additional offers from Florida and Texas A&M despite his commitment, with Ratcliffe indicating interest in visiting both schools. On January 4, 2024, he flipped his commitment to the Texas A&M Aggies.

=== Texas A&M ===
Ratcliffe transferred to Texas A&M during the January 2024 transfer portal window, joining the Aggies in time for spring practices. He engaged in a three-way position battle with Dalton Brooks and Trey Jones III for a starting safety job opposite Bryce Anderson ahead of the 2024 season. On September 7, Ratcliffe recorded an interception in a 52–10 win over McNeese. A week later, in their Southeastern Conference (SEC) opener against Florida, he intercepted a pass in the end zone and forced a fumble in a 33–20 victory. On September 21, Ratcliffe grabbed another interception in the end zone during a 26–20 win over Bowling Green, becoming the first Aggie since Jason Glenn in 2000 to record an interception in three consecutive games. He started 12 of 13 games and tallied 48 tackles, 3.5 tackles for loss, three interceptions, one forced fumble, and one blocked kick.

That offseason, Ratcliffe worked with Aggies strength and conditioning coach Tommy Moffitt to improve his size and strength, drawing praise from head coach Mike Elko. He also had a strong fall camp in the lead-up to the 2025 season. Ratcliffe started 12 of 13 games that year, finishing second on the team with 65 tackles to go along with three tackles for loss and three pass breakups. He helped the Aggies to an 11–2 record and their inaugural appearance in the College Football Playoff.

In January 2026, it was announced that Ratcliffe had finalized a deal to return to Texas A&M for the 2026 season. He was later selected as a team captain during spring practices. Ratcliffe was named to the preseason watchlists for the Bronko Nagurski Trophy, the Lott Trophy, and the Wuerffel Trophy, and earned second-team preseason All-America honors from multiple outlets. Blake Brockermeyer of CBS Sports wrote that he had "the size, length and athleticism NFL teams covet".

== Personal life ==
Ratcliffe has multiple military veterans in his family, including his father and grandfather. During his time at Texas A&M, he started Mission 3:12, an initiative to donate $312 for every turnover produced by the Aggies defense to Walk Among Heroes, a charity which sends World War II veterans on trips back to Normandy. Ratcliffe wore specialty cleats honoring Walk Among Heroes during the 2026 spring game as part of the "Aggies for a Cause" initiative. He also volunteered with an after-school program, a youth flag football program, and Habitat for Humanity.
