= Ashton Bethel-Roman =

American football player (born 2005)

No. 8 – Texas A&M Aggies
- Position: Wide receiver
- Class: (redshirt) Sophomore

Personal information
- Born: August 30, 2005 (age 21)
- Listed height: 6 ft 0 in (1.83 m)
- Listed weight: 185 lb (84 kg)

Career information
- High school: Ridge Point (Missouri City, Texas)
- College: Texas A&M (2024–present)
- Stats at ESPN

Ashton Bethel-Roman (born August 30, 2005) is an American college football wide receiver for the Texas A&M Aggies.

== Early life ==
Bethel-Roman attended Ridge Point High School in Missouri City, Texas. As a senior, he totaled 49 catches for 964 yards and nine touchdowns. A four-star recruit, Bethel-Roman initially committed to Arkansas but later flipped his commitment to play college football to Texas A&M University.

== College career ==
Bethel-Roman redshirted in 2024, hauling in four receptions for 44 yards and a touchdown in four games. During the 2025 season, his role in the Aggies' offense increased. Against South Carolina, Bethel-Roman caught four passes for 139 yards and a touchdown in the 31–30 come-from-behind victory.

=== Statistics ===
College statistics
Season	Team	GP	Receiving			
Season	Team	GP	Rec	Yds	Avg	TD
2024	Texas A&M	4	4	44	11.0	1
2025	Texas A&M	11	18	442	24.6	5
Career		15	22	486	22.1	6

== Personal life ==
Bethel-Roman is the son of former NFL safety Mark Roman.
