= Jordan Peterson (American football) =

American football coach (born 1987)

Current position
- Title: Defensive coordinator & defensive backs coach
- Team: Kansas State
- Conference: Big 12

Biographical details
- Born: August 18, 1987 (age 39); Brenham, Texas, U.S.
- Education: Texas A&M University (2009)

Playing career
- 2006–2009: Texas A&M
- Position: Cornerback

Coaching career (HC unless noted)
- 2010–2011: Texas A&M (GA)
- 2012–2016: Fresno State (Secondary/OLB)
- 2017–2018: New Mexico (S)
- 2019: New Mexico (DC/S)
- 2020: Kansas (S)
- 2021: Kansas (Defensive Analyst)
- 2022: Kansas (S)
- 2023: Kansas (Defensive Pass Game Coordinator/DB)
- 2024–2025: Texas A&M (co-DC/DB)
- 2026–present: Kansas State (DC/DB)

Jordan Peterson (born August 18, 1987) is an American football coach who is currently the defensive coordinator and defensive backs coach for Kansas State. He played college football at Texas A&M.

== Early life ==
Peterson graduated from Lexington High School, where he earned first-team all-state honors as a defensive back and honorable mention accolades as a quarterback his senior year. He committed to play college football at Texas A&M where he received his bachelor’s degree in sport management from Texas A&M in 2009 along with his master’s in education curriculum and instruction in 2010.

== Coaching career ==
After graduating, Peterson joined the Texas A&M coaching staff as a graduate assistant. In 2012, Peterson was hired at Fresno State to coach the secondary and outside linebackers while also serving as recruiting coordinator and special teams coach.

Following his time at Fresno State, Peterson took a job as the safeties coach at New Mexico, earning a promotion to defensive coordinator in 2019. He then joined Kansas in 2020, where he spent four seasons coaching defensive backs and was elevated to co-defensive coordinator in 2023. During his tenure, he helped Kansas secure back-to-back bowl berths for the second time in program history.

In January 2024, Peterson returned to Texas A&M as co-defensive coordinator and defensive backs coach under head coach Mike Elko.

== Personal life ==
Peterson earned his bachelor’s in sport management from Texas A&M in 2009. In 2010, he earned his master’s in education curriculum and instruction.

He is married to Melissa "Missy" Peterson (née Gordon). Together the couple have three daughters: Ellie, Emery, and Everly.
