= Desmond Ricks =

American football player

No. 2 – Texas A&M Aggies
- Position: Defensive back
- Class: (redshirt) Junior

Personal information
- Listed height: 6 ft 1 in (1.85 m)
- Listed weight: 188 lb (85 kg)

Career information
- High school: IMG Academy
- College: Alabama (2023); Texas A&M (2024–present)
- Stats at ESPN

Desmond "Dezz" Ricks is an American college football defensive back for the Texas A&M Aggies. He previously played for the Alabama Crimson Tide.

== Early life ==
Ricks grew up in Norfolk, Virginia and attended Norview High School and transferred to IMG Academy after his freshman year and graduated a year early. He was ranked the No. 3 corner nationally and the No. 10 player in the state of Florida. He was rated by Rivals.com as a five-star player the No. 10 recruit in the 2023 college football recruiting class. Ricks committed to play football at Alabama over other offers from schools such as LSU, Florida and Florida State. In January 2023, he played in the Under Armour All-America Game where he was part of the winning team.

== College career ==
=== Alabama ===
Ricks committed to Alabama in December 2022. During his true freshman season in 2023, he appeared in two games while providing depth in the veteran secondary unit while working on special teams.

On January 15, 2024, Ricks announced that he would enter the transfer portal.

=== Texas A&M ===
On January 17, 2024, Ricks announced that he would transfer to Texas A&M.
