= Chase Bisontis =

American football player (born 2004)

No. 57 – Arizona Cardinals
- Position: Guard
- Roster status: Injured reserve

Personal information
- Born: June 10, 2004 (age 22)
- Listed height: 6 ft 5 in (1.96 m)
- Listed weight: 314 lb (142 kg)

Career information
- High school: Don Bosco Prep (Ramsey, New Jersey)
- College: Texas A&M (2023–2025)
- NFL draft: 2026: 2nd round, 34th overall pick

Career history
- Arizona Cardinals (2026–present)

Awards and highlights
- Third-team All-SEC (2025); First-team All-SEC Freshman (2023)
- Stats at Pro Football Reference

Chase Bisontis (bih-SOHN-tiss; born June 10, 2004) is an American professional football guard for the Arizona Cardinals of the National Football League (NFL). He played college football for the Texas A&M Aggies and was selected by the Cardinals in the second round of the 2026 NFL draft.

== Early life ==
Bisontis attended and played high school football at Don Bosco Preparatory High School, earning NJ.com Offensive Player of the Year honors as a senior. He was rated as a four-star recruit, the top recruit in New Jersey, and the 47th overall player in the class of 2023. Bisontis committed to play college football for the Texas A&M Aggies over offers from schools such as Alabama, LSU, Miami, West Virginia, Penn State, Rutgers, Ohio State, Michigan State, Kentucky, Clemson, Notre Dame, Texas and Boston College.

== College career ==
Ahead of his freshman season in 2023, Bisontis was named a preseason freshman All-American by ESPN. He started all 12 games at right tackle that season, allowing four sacks on the year. Bisontis earned freshman all-American and freshman All-SEC honors. After the season, he entered his name into the NCAA transfer portal. However, Bisontis withdrew his name shortly thereafter.

== Professional career ==
Pre-draft measurables
Height	Weight	Arm length	Hand span	Wingspan	40-yard dash	10-yard split	20-yard split	20-yard shuttle	Three-cone drill	Vertical jump	Broad jump	Bench press
6 ft 5 1/4 in (1.96 m)	315 lb (143 kg)	31 3/4 in (0.81 m)	9 3/4 in (0.25 m)	6 ft 6 7/8 in (2.00 m)	5.02 s	1.76 s	2.90 s	4.78 s	7.53 s	32.0 in (0.81 m)	8 ft 9 in (2.67 m)	29 reps
All values from NFL Combine

Bisontis was selected by the Arizona Cardinals with the 34th overall pick in the second round of the 2026 NFL draft. He suffered a torn MCL during Arizona's preseason opener against the Las Vegas Raiders and was placed on season–ending injured reserve.
