= Theo Melin Öhrström =

Swedish-American football player

No. 18 – SMU Mustangs
- Position: Tight end
- Class: Redshirt Senior

Personal information
- Born: Stockholm, Sweden
- Listed height: 6 ft 6 in (1.98 m)
- Listed weight: 257 lb (117 kg)

Career information
- High school: RIG Academy (Uppsala, Sweden)
- College: Texas A&M (2022–2025); SMU (2026–present)
- Stats at ESPN

Theodor Melin Öhrström is a Swedish American football tight end for the SMU Mustangs. He previously played for the Texas A&M Aggies.

== Early life ==
Theo Melin Öhrström grew up in Stockholm, Sweden. He became interested in American football from watching highlights of Odell Beckham Jr. on YouTube. Melin Öhrström attended RIG Academy, which develops players for the Sweden national American football team. During the summer of 2021, he traveled to the United States to participate in football camps held by major college football programs. Melin Öhrström was rated a consensus four-star recruit and committed to play college football at Texas A&M over offers from Ohio State and LSU.

== College career ==
=== Texas A&M ===
Melin Öhrström was originally a member of the 2023 recruiting class, but reclassified to the 2022 class after completing the academic requirements needed to enroll at Texas A&M for their 2022 fall semester. He redshirted his true freshman season and was named the team's offensive scout team player of the year. Melin Öhrström played in 12 games during his redshirt freshman season.

On December 26, 2025, Melin Öhrström announced that he would enter the transfer portal.

=== SMU ===
On January 8, 2026, Melin Öhrström announced that he would transfer to SMU.

Melin currently has 11 rec 117 Yards and 4 TDs
