= Reuben Fatheree II =

American gridiron football player (born 2002)

- Fatheree with the Montreal Alouettes in 2026

No. 64 – Montreal Alouettes
- Position: Offensive tackle
- Roster status: Practice roster
- CFL status: American

Personal information
- Born: November 21, 2002 (age 23); Richmond, Texas, U.S.
- Listed height: 6 ft 8 in (2.03 m)
- Listed weight: 336 lb (152 kg)

Career information
- High school: Foster (Fort Bend County, Texas)
- College: Texas A&M (2021–2025)
- NFL draft: 2026: undrafted

Career history
- Montreal Alouettes (2026–present)

Awards and highlights
- Freshman All-American (2021); SEC All-Freshman Team (2021)
- Stats at ESPN

Reuben "Deuce" Fatheree II (born November 21, 2002) is an American professional football offensive tackle for the Montreal Alouettes of the Canadian Football League (CFL). He played college football for the Texas A&M Aggies.

== Early life ==
Fatheree played both football and basketball during high school. He was a first team all-district selection during his last three seasons of high school football. As a basketball player, Fatheree averaged 17.1 points and 11.3 rebounds per game as a senior.

On June 1, 2020, Fatheree committed to play college football for Texas A&M over offers from LSU, Ohio State, and Notre Dame, among others.

College recruiting
Name	Hometown	School	Height	Weight	Commit date
Reuben Fatheree II; OT	Richmond, Texas	Foster (TX)	6 ft 8 in (2.03 m)	300 lb (140 kg)	Jun 1, 2020
Reuben Fatheree II; OT	Recruit ratings: Rivals: 247Sports: ESPN: (83)				

== College career ==
Fatheree was initially projected to be a depth piece during his freshman year but began starting during the fourth game of the season.

On January 15, 2026, Fatheree declared for the 2026 NFL Draft.

== Professional career ==
Pre-draft measurables
Height	Weight	Arm length	Hand span	Wingspan	20-yard shuttle	Vertical jump	Bench press
6 ft 7 1/4 in (2.01 m)	331 lb (150 kg)	35 in (0.89 m)	9 3/8 in (0.24 m)	7 ft 1 3/8 in (2.17 m)	4.98 s	23.5 in (0.60 m)	25 reps
All values from Pro Day

On May 15, 2026, Fatheree signed with the Montreal Alouettes of the Canadian Football League (CFL). Before the beginning of the season, the Alouettes assigned Fatheree to their practice roster.
