= Dametrious Crownover =

American football player (born 2001)

No. 68 – New England Patriots
- Position: Offensive tackle
- Roster status: Active

Personal information
- Born: September 12, 2001 (age 25); Grandview, Texas, U.S.
- Listed height: 6 ft 7 in (2.01 m)
- Listed weight: 319 lb (145 kg)

Career information
- High school: Grandview (Grandview, Texas)
- College: Texas A&M (2021–2025)
- NFL draft: 2026: 6th round, 196th overall pick

Career history
- New England Patriots (2026–present)

Career NFL statistics as of Week 4, 2026
- Games played: 1
- Stats at Pro Football Reference

Dametrious Crownover (born September 12, 2001) is an American professional football offensive tackle for the New England Patriots of the National Football League (NFL). He played college football for the Texas A&M Aggies and was selected by the Patriots in the sixth round of the 2026 NFL draft.

== Early life ==
Crownover attended Grandview High School in Grandview, Texas. He committed to the Texas A&M University to play college football.

== College career ==
Crownover originally came to Texas A&M as a tight end before switching to offensive tackle. After spending his first three years as a backup, he became the starting right tackle in 2024.

== Professional career ==
Pre-draft measurables
Height	Weight	Arm length	Hand span	Wingspan	40-yard dash	10-yard split	20-yard split	20-yard shuttle	Three-cone drill
6 ft 7 1/4 in (2.01 m)	319 lb (145 kg)	35 3/8 in (0.90 m)	10 in (0.25 m)	7 ft 2 in (2.18 m)	5.14 s	1.79 s	3.01 s	4.98 s	7.88 s
All values from NFL Combine/Pro Day

Crownover was selected by the New England Patriots in the sixth round with the 196th overall pick of the 2026 NFL Draft.

== Personal life ==
Crownover's older brother Earnest also played for Texas A&M.

Crownover married Makenzie Vaughan on May 30, 2025.
