= Le'Veon Moss =

American football player (born 2002)

No. 37
- Position: Running back

Personal information
- Born: November 15, 2002 (age 23)
- Listed height: 5 ft 11 in (1.80 m)
- Listed weight: 211 lb (96 kg)

Career information
- High school: Istrouma (Baton Rouge, Louisiana)
- College: Texas A&M (2022–2025)
- NFL draft: 2026: undrafted

Career history
- Miami Dolphins (2026)*
- * Offseason or practice squad member only

Awards and highlights
- Second-team All-SEC (2024)
- Stats at Pro Football Reference

Le'Veon Moss (born November 15, 2002) is an American former professional football running back. He played college football for the Texas A&M Aggies and was signed by the Miami Dolphins as an undrafted free agent in 2026. Four days after being signed by the Dolphins, he retired from his football career.

== Early life ==
Moss attended Istrouma High School in Baton Rouge, Louisiana. During his high school career he had 1,754 rushing yards with 23 touchdowns. Moss was selected to play in the 2022 Under Armour All-American. He originally committed to play college football at the University of Alabama before switching to Texas A&M University.

== College career ==
Moss played in seven games his true freshman year at Texas A&M in 2022, and had 27 carries for 114 yards and a touchdown. As a sophomore he played in nine games with one start and rushed for 484 yards on 96 carries and five touchdowns. Moss returned to A&M in both his junior and senior years as a starter. In December 2025, he declared for the 2026 NFL draft.

=== Injuries ===
During the 2024 season, Moss tore both his ACL and his MCL in the game against South Carolina, causing his season to end prematurely. He was able to return for the 2025 season with “no lingering effects.”

During the 2025 season, Moss injured his ankle during the game against Florida, causing him to miss six games before returning to play against the Miami Hurricanes in the first round of the College Football Playoffs. Moss reaggravated his ankle injury during the fourth quarter against the Hurricanes, causing him to limp off the field, ending his time on the Texas A&M Aggies football team.

== Professional career ==
Pre-draft measurables
Height	Weight	Arm length	Hand span	Wingspan	40-yard dash	10-yard split	20-yard split	Vertical jump	Broad jump	Bench press
5 ft 11 in (1.80 m)	203 lb (92 kg)	31 in (0.79 m)	9 1/2 in (0.24 m)	6 ft 4 1/8 in (1.93 m)	4.59 s	1.56 s	2.63 s	31.5 in (0.80 m)	9 ft 11 in (3.02 m)	16 reps
All values from NFL Combine/Pro Day

On May 8, 2026, Moss signed with the Miami Dolphins as an undrafted free agent. However four days later, he retired from professional football.

== Personal life ==
On July 21, 2026, Moss was arrested in Baton Rouge, Louisiana after his two–year–old son accidentally shot himself with an unsecured firearm.
