= Scooby Williams =

American football player (born 2003)

Profile
- Position: Linebacker

Personal information
- Born: January 27, 2003 (age 23); Birmingham, Alabama, U.S.
- Listed height: 6 ft 2 in (1.88 m)
- Listed weight: 231 lb (105 kg)

Career information
- High school: Ramsay (Birmingham)
- College: Florida (2021–2023); Texas A&M (2024–2025)
- NFL draft: 2026: undrafted
- Stats at Pro Football Reference

Jeremiah "Scooby" Williams (born January 27, 2003) is an American football linebacker. He played college football for the Florida Gators and Texas A&M Aggies.

== Early life ==
Williams attended Ramsay High School in Birmingham, Alabama. He committed to play college football for the Florida Gators over other offers from schools such as Alabama and Auburn.

Williams received the nickname “Scooby” from his friends in high school after constantly carrying around Scooby-Doo fruit snack gummies. In an interview with The Gainesville Sun, Williams said, “They were just so good, and they’d say, ‘You are what you eat,’ so it became Scooby Snacks.”

== College career ==
=== Florida ===
As a freshman in 2021, Williams appeared in four games and took a redshirt. In 2022, he played in eight games, totaling 14 tackles. In week 3 of the 2023 season, he recorded a career-high eight tackles against Tennessee. In 2023 he made ten starts, notching 53 tackles with four going for a loss, a sack, and two forced fumbles, after which he entered the transfer portal.

=== Texas A&M ===
Williams transferred to play for the Texas A&M Aggies. In week 8 of the 2024 season, he totaled six tackles with two going for a loss and his first-career interception in a victory against Mississippi State. During the 2024 season, Williams appeared in 11 games with 10 starts, totaling 43 tackles with eight being for a loss and an interception. He entered the 2025 season as a starter at linebacker for the Aggies. In week 3 of the 2025 season, Williams brought down an interception in an upset win over Notre Dame.

== Professional career ==
Pre-draft measurables
Height	Weight	Arm length	Hand span	Wingspan
6 ft 2 1/4 in (1.89 m)	231 lb (105 kg)	32 in (0.81 m)	9 1/4 in (0.23 m)	6 ft 7 1/4 in (2.01 m)
All values from NFL Combine

Williams agreed to terms with the Minnesota Vikings to sign as an undrafted free agent after the conclusion of the 2026 NFL draft, but he failed his physical and did not sign or participate in the team's rookie minicamp.
