= Tyreek Chappell =

American football player (born 2002)

Profile
- Position: Cornerback

Personal information
- Born: November 22, 2002 (age 23)
- Listed height: 5 ft 11 in (1.80 m)
- Listed weight: 180 lb (82 kg)

Career information
- High school: Northeast (Philadelphia, Pennsylvania)
- College: Texas A&M (2021–2025)
- NFL draft: 2026: undrafted

Career history
- Minnesota Vikings (2026)*
- * Offseason or practice squad member only
- Stats at Pro Football Reference

Tyreek Chappell (born November 22, 2002) is an American football cornerback. He played college football for the Texas A&M Aggies.

== Early life ==
Chappell attended Northeast High School in Philadelphia, Pennsylvania. He committed to play college football for the Texas A&M Aggies over offers from other schools such as Michigan, Arizona State, Baylor, and Boston College.

== College career ==
As a freshman in 2021, Chappell notched 41 tackles, nine pass deflections, and an interception in 12 games, earning freshman all-American honors. In 2022, Chappell totaled 44 tackles and eight pass deflections in 11 starts. In the 2023 season, he racked up 21 tackles and an interception in ten starts. Chappell played in just two games in 2024 before suffering a season-ending knee injury, recording three tackles with one being for a loss. He returned in 2025, totaling 34 tackles and four pass deflections.

== Professional career ==
Pre-draft measurables
Height	Weight	Arm length	Hand span	Wingspan	40-yard dash	10-yard split	20-yard split	20-yard shuttle	Three-cone drill	Vertical jump	Broad jump
5 ft 10 3/8 in (1.79 m)	188 lb (85 kg)	30 1/4 in (0.77 m)	8 7/8 in (0.23 m)	6 ft 1 7/8 in (1.88 m)	4.57 s	1.54 s	2.63 s	4.26 s	7.07 s	36.0 in (0.91 m)	10 ft 2 in (3.10 m)
All values from Pro Day

After not being selected in the 2026 NFL draft, Chappell signed with the Minnesota Vikings as an undrafted free agent. He was waived with an injury designation on August 24, 2026. After he cleared waivers he reverted to the Vikings injured reserve list the next day. On October 6, he was waived from the injured reserve list.
