= Tony Jerod-Eddie =

American football player (born 1990)

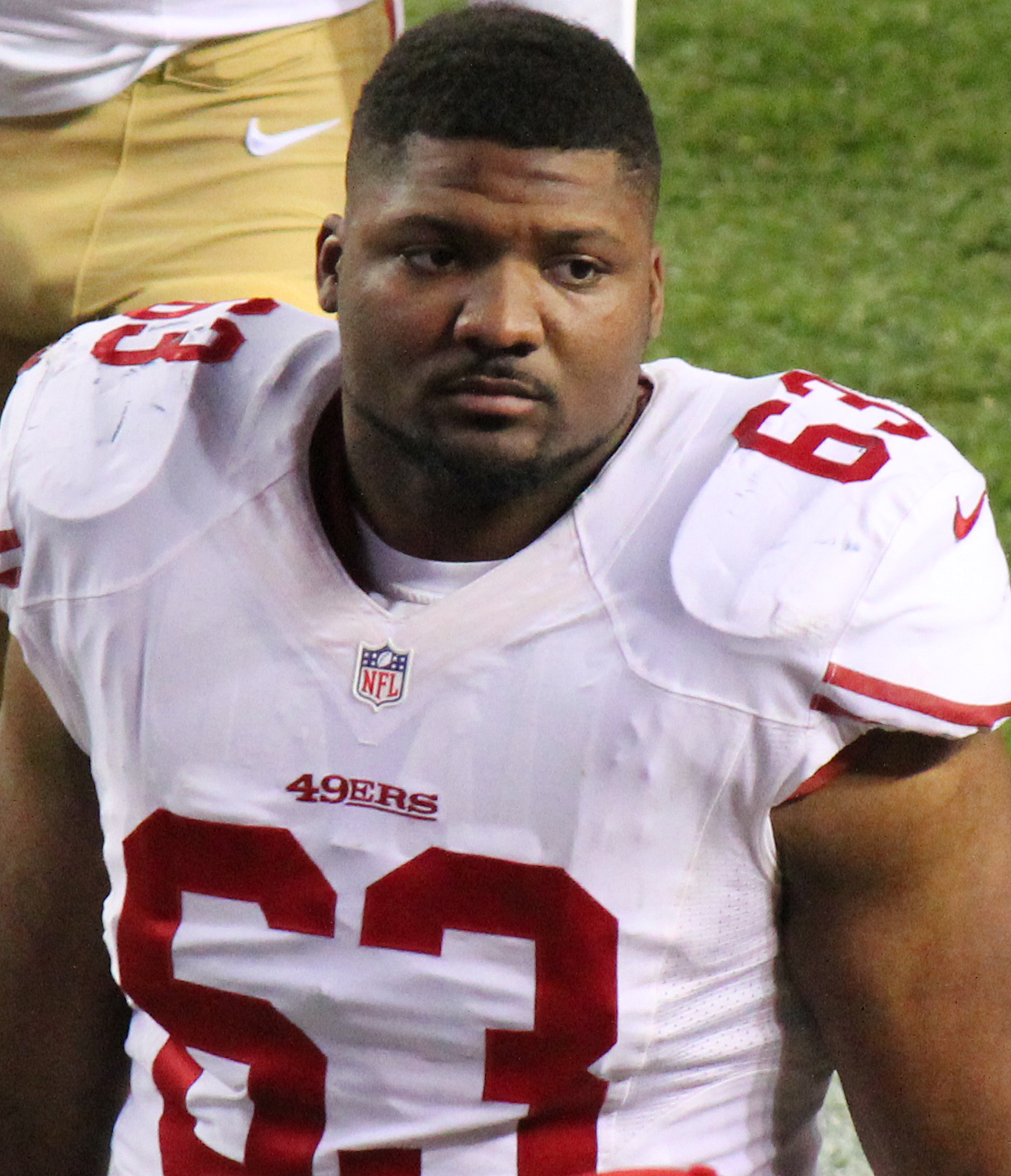
- Jerod-Eddie with the 49ers in 2014

No. 63
- Position: Nose tackle

Personal information
- Born: March 29, 1990 (age 36); Dallas, Texas, U.S.
- Listed height: 6 ft 5 in (1.96 m)
- Listed weight: 301 lb (137 kg)

Career information
- High school: DeSoto (DeSoto, Texas)
- College: Texas A&M
- NFL draft: 2012: undrafted

Career history
- San Francisco 49ers (2012–2016)

Awards and highlights
- Second-team All-Big 12 (2011)

Career NFL statistics
- Total tackles: 69
- Interceptions: 1
- Stats at Pro Football Reference

Tony Jerod-Eddie (born March 29, 1990) is an American former professional football player who was a nose tackle and is currently the defensive line coach for the Texas A&M Aggies. He played professionally as a nose tackle for the San Francisco 49ers of the National Football League (NFL),

Jerod-Eddie played college football for Texas A&M. He signed with the San Francisco 49ers as an undrafted free agent in 2012.

== Early life ==
Jerod-Eddie attended DeSoto High School in DeSoto, Texas. He was a two-time first-team all-district defensive line and was selected for the Honorable Mention 5A All-State honors.

== College career ==
Jerod-Eddie attended Texas A&M University and was an honorable mention All-Big 12 after his junior season. He finished college with 147 tackles, 7 sacks, 5 pass deflections, and a forced fumble.

== Professional career ==
On May 4, 2012, Jerod-Eddie signed with the San Francisco 49ers as an undrafted free agent. On August 31, 2012, he was released. On September 1, 2012, he was signed to the San Francisco 49ers practice squad. On December 28, 2012, he was promoted to the active roster after the team placed wide receiver Mario Manningham on injured reserve.

On October 6, 2013, during a game against the Houston Texans, Jerod-Eddie came into the game in relief of 49ers starter Ray McDonald and recorded his first career interception off quarterback Matt Schaub. In the 2013 playoffs, he was credited with half a sack.

Between 2012 and 2016, Jerod-Eddie played in 57 games across six seasons for the San Francisco 49ers.
