= Christian Ellsworth =

American football coach

Current position
- Title: Quarterbacks coach
- Team: Kansas State
- Conference: Big 12

Playing career
- 2016–2019: Northern Iowa
- Position: Quarterback

Coaching career (HC unless noted)
- 2020–2021: Kansas State (GA)
- 2022: South Carolina (GA)
- 2023: Nebraska (OA)
- 2024: Texas A&M (SOA)
- 2025: Texas A&M (TE)
- 2026–present: Kansas State (QB)

Christian Ellsworth is an American football coach who is the quarterbacks coach for the Kansas State Wildcats football team. He played college football for the Northern Iowa Panthers.

== Playing career ==
Ellsworth grew up in Grand Island, Nebraska and attended Northwest High School. He played college football at Northern Iowa as a reserve quarterback.

== Coaching career ==
Ellsworth began his coaching career as an offensive graduate assistant at Kansas State in 2020. He left Kansas State in 2022 to take a graduate assistant position at South Carolina. After one year at South Carolina, Ellsworth was hired as an offensive assistant at Nebraska. He left the Cornhuskers' coaching staff in 2024 after being hired as a senior offensive assistant at Texas A&M, reuniting him with Collin Klein who had been his quarterbacks coach at Northern Iowa. After one season, he was promoted to tight ends coach. Ellsworth returned to Kansas State in 2026 to be the quarterbacks coach on Klein's inaugural coaching staff as head coach of the Wildcats.
