= Jay Bateman =

American football player and coach (born 1973)

Current position
- Title: Defensive coordinator
- Team: Kentucky
- Conference: SEC

Biographical details
- Born: July 16, 1973 (age 53); Richmond, Virginia, U.S.

Playing career
- 1991–1994: Randolph–Macon
- Position: Linebacker

Coaching career (HC unless noted)
- 1995–1997: Benedictine HS (VA) (assistant)
- 1997–1998: Hampden–Sydney (GA)
- 1999: Siena (DC)
- 2000–2003: Siena
- 2004: Richmond (asst. secondary)
- 2005: Lehigh (DL)
- 2006–2010: Elon (DC/LB)
- 2011–2013: Ball State (DC/ILB)
- 2014–2018: Army (DC)
- 2019–2021: North Carolina (co-DC/S)
- 2022–2023: Florida (ILB)
- 2024–2025: Texas A&M (DC/LB)
- 2026–present: Kentucky (DC)

Head coaching record
- Overall: 5–35

Jay Bateman (born July 16, 1973) is an American football coach who is currently the defensive coordinator at the University of Kentucky. He previously served as the defensive coordinator for Texas A&M, the inside linebackers coach for the University of Florida and the co-defensive coordinator and safeties coach at the University of North Carolina at Chapel Hill. A former Broyles Award finalist, he has also had assistant coaching stints at Ball State, Army as well as a head coaching stint at Siena from 2000 to 2003.

== Coaching career ==
After graduating from Randolph–Macon College in 1995, Bateman went to work for a company that sold paper machinery. He got into coaching when the owner sold the company, working as an assistant coach at Benedictine High School in Richmond. He got his first job in the college ranks at Hampden–Sydney College in 1997 as a graduate assistant, working with the defensive line and linebackers. He was named the defensive coordinator at Siena College in New York in 1999, and was promoted to head coach in 2000. At the time of his promotion, he was said to be the youngest head coach in Division I football at 26. After the football program was shut down in 2003, he joined the coaching staff at Richmond in 2004 as their assistant secondary coach, on a coaching staff that had future college and NFL assistants, such as Mike Elko, Patrick Graham, and Marcus Satterfield. He also had assistant coaching stints under Pete Lembo at Lehigh, Elon, and Ball State.

=== Army ===
Bateman was named the defensive coordinator at Army in 2014. He was suspended in 2017 when it was revealed that he had received improper information from former Wake Forest radio announcer Tommy Elrod. In addition to the suspension, he was also fined $25,000 and forced to attend an ethics training program.

Bateman was named a finalist for the Broyles Award in 2018, the award is given to the top assistant coach in college football. In his tenure with Army, he improved the Black Knights defense from 91st overall in 2014 to 8th in the country in 2018.

=== North Carolina ===
Bateman was named the co-defensive coordinator and safeties coach at North Carolina on December 9, 2018. He and co-coordinator Tommy Thigpen oversaw the position change and development of former quarterback Chazz Surratt into an all-conference linebacker and NFL draftee and brought in several top defensive recruits to the program, being a key player in the Tar Heels' recruiting upswing. After three years leading the Tar Heel defense, Bateman and UNC agreed to part ways after the 2021 season, which featured the worst defensive unit of his tenure.

=== Florida ===
In January 2022, Bateman joined Billy Napier's staff at Florida as the inside linebackers coach.

=== Texas A&M ===
On December 21, 2023, Bateman was hired to become the new defensive coordinator at Texas A&M under new head coach Mike Elko.

=== Kentucky ===
In December 2025, new Kentucky head coach Will Stein hired Bateman to serve as defensive coordinator.

== Head coaching record ==
Year	Team	Overall	Conference	Standing	Bowl/playoffs
Siena Saints (Metro Atlantic Athletic Conference) (2000–2003)
2000	Siena	1–9	1–6	8th	
2001	Siena	1–8	1–6	T–7th	
2002	Siena	3–7	3–5	6th	
2003	Siena	0–11	0–5	6th	
Siena:		5–35	5–22		
Total:		5–35			

== Personal life ==
Bateman and his wife Heather have two children, Bea and C.J.. C.J. was diagnosed with autism in 2016. Bateman cited that one of the reasons he took the North Carolina job was because UNC and Duke are two of the biggest research institutions in the country and hoped to improve the quality of living for his son.
