= Holmon Wiggins =

American football player and coach (born 1980)

Current position
- Title: Offensive coordinator
- Team: Texas A&M
- Conference: SEC

Biographical details
- Born: June 2, 1980 (age 46); Los Angeles, California, U.S.
- Education: University of New Mexico

Playing career
- 1998–2001: New Mexico
- Position: Running back

Coaching career (HC unless noted)
- 2003–2004: New Mexico (SA)
- 2005: New Mexico (GA)
- 2006–2010: Illinois State (RB)
- 2011: Tulsa (RB)
- 2012–2015: Memphis (WR)
- 2016–2018: Virginia Tech (WR)
- 2019–2020: Alabama (WR)
- 2021–2023: Alabama (AHC/WR)
- 2024–2025: Texas A&M (co-OC/WR)
- 2026–present: Texas A&M (OC)

Holmon Dancy Wiggins (born June 2, 1980) is an American football coach who is currently the offensive coordinator for the Texas A&M Aggies.

== Early life ==
Wiggins played high school football at San Pedro High School and was the city's Class 4A Player of the Year.

== Playing career ==
Wiggins was a four-year letterwinner and three-year starting running back at the University of New Mexico and holds the school records for single-season punt returns (46) and punt return yards (392).

== Coaching career ==
=== New Mexico ===
Wiggins began his career as a student assistant at New Mexico from 2003 to 2004 before becoming a graduate assistant in 2005.

=== Illinois State ===
In 2006, he joined Illinois State as the running backs coach. He remained there until after the 2010 season.

=== Tulsa ===
In 2011, he joined Tulsa and spent a single year as the team's running backs coach.

=== Memphis ===
In 2012, he reunited with Justin Fuente at Memphis as their wide receivers coach.

=== Virginia Tech ===
In 2016, Wiggins followed Justin Fuente to Virginia Tech as their wide receivers coach. While coaching the Hokies’ wide receivers for three years, he helped Cam Phillips establish himself as Virginia Tech’s career leader in receptions and receiving yards.

=== Alabama ===
In 2019, Wiggins became the Alabama wide receivers coach under Nick Saban.

In 2020 in addition to winning the national championship, DeVonta Smith won the Heisman Trophy whilst under Wiggins. He was the first wide receiver to win the award since Desmond Howard in 1991, and only the fourth overall.

In 2021, he was promoted to assistant head coach of offense in addition to wide receivers coach.

=== Texas A&M ===
In January 2024, it was announced that Wiggins would be hired as the wide receiver's coach at Texas A&M. With the departure of Collin Klein to take the head coaching position at Kansas State University, Wiggins was promoted to offensive coordinator on December 15, 2025.
