= Bryce Anderson =

American football player (born 2004)

No. 1 – Texas A&M Aggies
- Position: Defensive back
- Class: Graduate

Personal information
- Born: April 9, 2004 (age 22)
- Listed height: 5 ft 10 in (1.78 m)
- Listed weight: 196 lb (89 kg)

Career information
- High school: West Brook (Beaumont, Texas)
- College: Texas A&M (2022–present)
- Stats at ESPN

Bryce Anderson (born April 9, 2004) is an American college football safety for the Texas A&M Aggies.

== Early life ==
Anderson attended West Brook High School in Beaumont, Texas. He was rated as a four-star recruit and initially committed to play college football for the LSU Tigers over offers from schools such as Alabama, Florida, Texas A&M and Texas. However, over a year later, he de-committed from the Tigers and committed to play for the Texas A&M Aggies.

== College career ==
As a freshman in 2022, Anderson notched 28 tackles, a forced fumble, and two fumble recoveries for the Aggies. In 2023, he totaled 55 tackles with seven being for a loss, a sack and a half, five pass deflections, an interception, a forced fumble, and a fumble recovery. In week 3 of the 2024 season, Anderson intercepted a pass which he returned 45 yards for a touchdown in a win over Florida.
