= Dalton Brooks =

American football player (born c.2004)

No. 7 – Texas A&M Aggies
- Position: Safety
- Class: Senior

Personal information
- Listed height: 6 ft 0 in (1.83 m)
- Listed weight: 193 lb (88 kg)

Career information
- High school: Shiner (Shiner, Texas)
- College: Texas A&M (2023–present)
- Stats at ESPN

Dalton Brooks (born c. 2004) is an American college football safety for the Texas A&M Aggies.

== Early life ==
Brooks attended Shiner High School in Shiner, Texas. He was named offensive MVP of the 2020 state championship game after he rushed for two touchdowns in a win over Post High School. Brooks finished his junior season with 2,616 rushing yards for 39 touchdowns to go with 150 tackles and three interceptions on defense, en route to another state title win. Coming out of high school, Brooks was rated as a four-star recruit, and received offers from school such as Alabama, Georgia, Ohio State, Texas, and Texas A&M. He committed to play college football for the Texas A&M Aggies.

== College career ==
As a freshman, Brooks hauled in his first collegiate interception in a win over Oklahoma State in the 2023 Texas Bowl. He finished the season with 18 tackles and an interception. In the 2024 season opener, Brooks was ejected shortly into the first quarter for targeting on Notre Dame quarterback Riley Leonard. He was ejected for targeting a second time in a week 3 victory over Florida. In the regular season finale, Brooks totaled ten tackles against rival #3 Texas. He played in all 13 games with eight starts on the season, notching 59 tackles with five and a half being for a loss.

== Legal issues ==
In 2025, Brooks was arrested and charged with failure to stop or return following a hit-and-run crash while driving a U-Haul truck.
