= 2023 Oklahoma Sooners football team =

American college football season

2023 Oklahoma Sooners football

Alamo Bowl, L 24–38 vs. Arizona
- Conference: Big 12 Conference

Ranking
- Coaches: No. 15
- AP: No. 15
- Record: 10–3 (7–2 Big 12)
- Head coach: Brent Venables (2nd season)
- Offensive coordinator: Jeff Lebby (2nd season)
- Offensive scheme: Veer and shoot
- Defensive coordinator: Ted Roof (2nd season)
- Co-defensive coordinators: Todd Bates (2nd season); Jay Valai (2nd season)
- Base defense: 4–3
- Home stadium: Gaylord Family Oklahoma Memorial Stadium

2023 Big 12 Conference football standings
	Conf.			Overall
Team	W		L	W		L
No. 3 Texas y$^	8	–	1	12	–	2
No. 16 Oklahoma State y	7	–	2	10	–	4
No. 15 Oklahoma	7	–	2	10	–	3
Iowa State	6	–	3	7	–	6
No. 18 Kansas State	6	–	3	9	–	4
West Virginia	6	–	3	9	–	4
Texas Tech	5	–	4	7	–	6
No. 23 Kansas	5	–	4	9	–	4
UCF	3	–	6	6	–	7
TCU	3	–	6	5	–	7
Houston	2	–	7	4	–	8
BYU	2	–	7	5	–	7
Baylor	2	–	7	3	–	9
Cincinnati	1	–	8	3	–	9
Championship: Texas 49, Oklahoma State 21
^ – College Football Playoff participant; $ – Conference champion; y – Championship game participant; Rankings from AP Poll

The 2023 Oklahoma Sooners football team represented the University of Oklahoma during the 2023 NCAA Division I FBS football season, the 129th season for the Oklahoma Sooners. They were led by second-year head coach Brent Venables. They played their home games at Gaylord Family Oklahoma Memorial Stadium in Norman, Oklahoma. They were a charter member of the Big 12 Conference. The season marked the team's last season as members of the Big 12 Conference before joining the SEC on July 1, 2024.

== Offseason ==
=== Departures ===
==== Entered NFL draft ====
Players listed below left Oklahoma to enter the draft with eligibility remaining, excluding seniors who were allowed a 5th year by the NCAA due to the COVID-19 pandemic.

Player	Position
Marvin Mims	WR

==== Outgoing transfers ====
Player	Position	Height	Weight	Year	New team
Theo Wease Jr.	WR	6'3	205	Redshirt junior	Missouri
Joshua Eaton	DB	6'1	183	Junior	Texas State
Brian Darby	WR	6'0	202	Junior	
Kendall Dennis	DB	5'11	187	Redshirt sophomore	South Florida
Jordan Mukes	DB	6'1	207	Sophomore	Abilene Christian
Trevon West	WR	5'11	180	Junior	Tarleton
Nick Evers	QB	6'3	185	Freshman	Wisconsin
Bryson Washington	DB	6'2	190	Redshirt sophomore	New Mexico
Davion Woolen	WR	6'2	188	Freshman	
Cedric Roberts	DL	6'3	275	Freshman	Texas State
Alton Tarber	DL	6'2	322	Freshman	
Clayton Smith	DL	6'4	245	Redshirt freshman	Arizona State
Kevonte Henry	DL	6'4	214	Freshman	Cerritos
Josh Ellison	DL	6'3	300	Senior	Memphis
David Ugwoegbu	LB	6'4	250	Senior	Houston
Marcus Alexander	OL	6'4	325	Redshirt junior	Texas State
Brey Walker	OL	6'7	355	Redshirt senior	Texas State
Micah Bowens II	QB	5'11	190	Redshirt sophomore	Charlotte
Reed Lindsey	DL	6'4	268	Redshirt junior	Central Oklahoma
Damon Smith	WR	6'1	198	Redshirt junior	South Florida
Kori Roberson Jr.	DL	6'3	285	Redshirt junior	SMU
Jaden Davis	DB	5'10	183	Senior	Miami (FL)
Damond Harmon	DB	6'0	180	Sophomore	North Carolina A&T
Jamarrien Burt	DB	6'0	185	Freshman	South Alabama
Cullen Montgomery	OL	6'4	330	Redshirt freshman	Memphis
Derrick LeBlanc	DL	6'5	265	Freshmen	UCF

Former 5-star recruit Theo Wease Jr. transferred to Missouri after three seasons with the Sooners. Wease Jr. recorded 64 receptions for 1,044 yards and 10 touchdowns during his tenure. Senior David Ugowegbu transferred to Houston after ranking second on the team with 101 tackles last season.

=== Additions ===
==== Incoming transfers ====
Player	Position	Height	Weight	Year	Former team
Emeka Megwa	RB	6'0	205	Redshirt sophomore	Washington
Jacob Lacey	DL	6'1	272	Redshirt senior	Notre Dame
Luke Elzinga	P	6'4	210	Redshirt senior	Central Michigan
Blake Smith	TE	6'4	255	Redshirt junior	Texas A&M
Austin Stogner	TE	6'6	255	Senior	South Carolina
Dasan McCullough	LB	6'5	222	Sophomore	Indiana
Trace Ford	DL	6'2	251	Redshirt senior	Oklahoma State
Reggie Pearson Jr.	DB	5'10	199	Redshirt senior	Texas Tech
Walter Rouse	OL	6'6	315	Redshirt senior	Stanford
Davon Sears	DL	6'2	282	Redshirt senior	Texas State
Caleb Shaffer	OL	6'5	337	Redshirt senior	Miami (OH)
Rondell Bothroyd	DL	6'3	275	Redshirt senior	Wake Forest
Andrel Anthony	WR	6'1	186	Junior	Michigan
Brenen Thompson	WR	5'11	162	Sophomore	Texas
Abdelrahman Assaf	DL	6'0	220	Sophomore	AUC
Troy Everett	OL	6'3	285	Redshirt freshman	Appalachian State
Da'Jon Terry	DL	6'4	320	Redshirt senior	Tennessee
Philip Paea	DL	6'4	296	Redshirt senior	Utah State
Hampton Fay	TE	6'5	241	Redshirt sophomore	Michigan State

The Sooners added fourteen new transfers for head coach Brent Venables's second season. Former Sooner Austin Stogner re-committed to Oklahoma after playing a sole season with South Carolina. Indiana transfer Dasan McCullough committed to the Sooners alongside his brother, Daeh, a 2023 4-star recruit. As a freshman, McCullough recorded 48 tackles and four sacks in 11 games for the Hoosiers. Andrel Anthony committed to the Sooners from Michigan after catching 19 passes for 328 years and four touchdowns in his two seasons with the Wolverines. Trace Ford and Brenen Thompson committed to the Sooners after transferring from longtime rivals Oklahoma State and Texas respectively.

==== Recruiting ====
Class rankings

Site	National	Conference	5 stars	4 stars	3 stars
ESPN	4	2	3	11	12
On3	7	2	3	12	11
Rivals	6	2	3	14	9
247Sports	4	2	3	14	9

College recruiting
Name	Hometown	School	Height	Weight	Commit date
Joshua Bates; OL	Durango, CO	Durango High School	6 ft 3 in (1.91 m)	280 lb (130 kg)	Aug 13, 2021
Joshua Bates; OL	Recruit ratings: Rivals: 247Sports: ESPN: (79)				
Jackson Arnold; QB	Denton, TX	Guyer High School	6 ft 2 in (1.88 m)	195 lb (88 kg)	Jan 24, 2022
Jackson Arnold; QB	Recruit ratings: Rivals: 247Sports: ESPN: (93)				
Erik McCarty; RB	McAlester, OK	McAlester High School	6 ft 2 in (1.88 m)	180 lb (82 kg)	Jan 29, 2022
Erik McCarty; RB	Recruit ratings: Rivals: 247Sports: ESPN: (78)				
Keyon Brown; WR	Tallahassee, FL	Rickards High School	6 ft 3 in (1.91 m)	187 lb (85 kg)	Jun 5, 2022
Keyon Brown; WR	Recruit ratings: Rivals: 247Sports: ESPN: (82)				
Kade McIntyre; ATH	Fremont, NE	Archbishop Bergan High School	6 ft 5 in (1.96 m)	200 lb (91 kg)	Jun 13, 2022
Kade McIntyre; ATH	Recruit ratings: Rivals: 247Sports: ESPN: (79)				
Kalib Hicks; RB	Denton, TX	Ryan High School	6 ft 0 in (1.83 m)	280 lb (130 kg)	Jun 15, 2022
Kalib Hicks; RB	Recruit ratings: Rivals: 247Sports: ESPN: (78)				
Heath Ozaeta; OL	Snoqualmie, WA	Mount Si High School	6 ft 6 in (1.98 m)	296 lb (134 kg)	Jun 27, 2022
Heath Ozaeta; OL	Recruit ratings: Rivals: 247Sports: ESPN: (79)				
Samuel Omosigho; LB	Crandall, TX	Crandall High School	6 ft 1 in (1.85 m)	205 lb (93 kg)	Jun 30, 2022
Samuel Omosigho; LB	Recruit ratings: Rivals: 247Sports: ESPN: (84)				
Phil Picciotti; LB	Bradenton, FL	IMG Academy	6 ft 3 in (1.91 m)	225 lb (102 kg)	Jul 4, 2022
Phil Picciotti; LB	Recruit ratings: Rivals: 247Sports: ESPN: (79)				
Jaquaize Pettaway; WR	Houston, TX	Langham Creek High School	6 ft 0 in (1.83 m)	170 lb (77 kg)	Jul 6, 2022
Jaquaize Pettaway; WR	Recruit ratings: Rivals: 247Sports: ESPN: (86)				
Cayden Green; OL	Lee's Summit, MO	Lee's Summit North High School	6 ft 5 in (1.96 m)	310 lb (140 kg)	Jul 8, 2022
Cayden Green; OL	Recruit ratings: Rivals: 247Sports: ESPN: (86)				
Logan Howland; OL	Princeton, NJ	Hun High School	6 ft 7 in (2.01 m)	280 lb (130 kg)	Jul 9, 2022
Logan Howland; OL	Recruit ratings: Rivals: 247Sports: ESPN: (78)				
Adepoju Adebawore; DE	North Kansas City, MO	North Kansas City High School	6 ft 4 in (1.93 m)	240 lb (110 kg)	Jul 10, 2022
Adepoju Adebawore; DE	Recruit ratings: Rivals: 247Sports: ESPN: (90)				
Daylan Smothers; RB	Charlotte, NC	West Charlotte High School	6 ft 0 in (1.83 m)	183 lb (83 kg)	Jul 14, 2022
Daylan Smothers; RB	Recruit ratings: Rivals: 247Sports: ESPN: (82)				
Lewis Carter; LB	Tampa, FL	Tampa Catholic High School	6 ft 0 in (1.83 m)	200 lb (91 kg)	Jul 16, 2022
Lewis Carter; LB	Recruit ratings: Rivals: 247Sports: ESPN: (84)				
Josiah Wagoner; DB	Spanaway, WA	Spanaway Lake High School	5 ft 1 in (1.55 m)	170 lb (77 kg)	Jul 25, 2022
Josiah Wagoner; DB	Recruit ratings: Rivals: 247Sports: ESPN: (81)				
Derrick LeBlanc; DE	Kissimmee, FL	Osceola High School	6 ft 4 in (1.93 m)	265 lb (120 kg)	Jul 28, 2022
Derrick LeBlanc; DE	Recruit ratings: Rivals: 247Sports: ESPN: (84)				
Jacobe Johnson; ATH	Mustang, OK	Mustang High School	6 ft 3 in (1.91 m)	170 lb (77 kg)	Aug 13, 2022
Jacobe Johnson; ATH	Recruit ratings: Rivals: 247Sports: ESPN: (86)				
Makari Vickers; DB	Tallahassee, FL	Robert F. Munroe Day School	6 ft 2 in (1.88 m)	195 lb (88 kg)	Aug 26, 2022
Makari Vickers; DB	Recruit ratings: Rivals: 247Sports: ESPN: (85)				
Ashton Sanders; DT	Los Angeles, CA	Cathedral High School	6 ft 2 in (1.88 m)	300 lb (140 kg)	Nov 20, 2022
Ashton Sanders; DT	Recruit ratings: Rivals: 247Sports: ESPN: (79)				
Taylor Wein; DE	Nolensville, TN	Nolensville High School	6 ft 5 in (1.96 m)	245 lb (111 kg)	Nov 21, 2022
Taylor Wein; DE	Recruit ratings: Rivals: 247Sports: ESPN: (77)				
Kendal Dolby; DB	Springfield, OH	Northeastern Oklahoma A&M	5 ft 11 in (1.80 m)	180 lb (82 kg)	Nov 23, 2022
Kendal Dolby; DB	Recruit ratings: Rivals: 247Sports: ESPN: (76)				
Dash McCullough; DB	South Bend, IN	St. Joseph's High School	6 ft 1 in (1.85 m)	200 lb (91 kg)	Dec 12, 2022
Dash McCullough; DB	Recruit ratings: Rivals: 247Sports: ESPN: (80)				
Markus Strong; DE	Lake Butler, FL	Union County High School	6 ft 4 in (1.93 m)	268 lb (122 kg)	Dec 21, 2022
Markus Strong; DE	Recruit ratings: Rivals: 247Sports: ESPN: (77)				
Peyton Bowen; DB	Denton, TX	Guyer High School	6 ft 1 in (1.85 m)	185 lb (84 kg)	Dec 22, 2022
Peyton Bowen; DB	Recruit ratings: Rivals: 247Sports: ESPN: (90)				
Taylor Heim; ATH	Bethany, OK	Bethany High School	6 ft 5 in (1.96 m)	190 lb (86 kg)	Jan 27, 2023
Taylor Heim; ATH	Recruit ratings: Rivals: 247Sports: ESPN: (77)				
Overall recruit ranking: Rivals: #6 247Sports: #6 ESPN: #4
Note: In many cases, Scout, Rivals, 247Sports, On3, and ESPN may conflict in their listings of height and weight.; In these cases, the average was taken. ESPN grades are on a 100-point scale.; Sources: "Rivals commits". Rivals.; "ESPN commits". ESPN.; "2023 Team Ranking". Rivals.com.; "247Sports commits". 247Sports.

== Preseason ==
=== Award watch lists ===
Award	Player	Position	Year
Lott Trophy	Danny Stutsman	LB	Jr.
Dodd Trophy	Brent Venables	HC	–
Maxwell Award	Dillon Gabriel	QB	Sr.
Ray Guy Award	Luke Elzinga	P	(redshirt) Sr.
Wuerffel Trophy	Ethan Downs	DL	Jr.
John Mackey Award	Austin Stogner	TE	(redshirt) Sr.
Davey O'Brien Award	Dillon Gabriel	QB	Sr.
Doak Walker Award	Jovantae Barnes	RB	So.
Butkus Award	Danny Stutsman	LB	Jr.
Chuck Bednarik Award	Ethan Downs	DL	Jr.
Manning Award	Dillon Gabriel	QB	Sr.
Lombardi Award	Ethan Downs	DL	Jr.
Polynesian College Football	Jonah Laulu	DL	(redshirt) Sr.
Johnny Unitas Golden Arm Award	Dillon Gabriel	QB	Sr.

=== Preseason All Big-12 teams ===
Position	Player	Class
Defense
DL	Ethan Downs	Jr.

=== Big 12 media poll ===
Predicted finish	Team	Votes (1st place)
1	Texas (41)	886
2	Kansas State (14)	858
3	Oklahoma (4)	758
4	Texas Tech (4)	729
5	TCU (3)	727
6	Baylor	572
7	Oklahoma State (1)	470
8	UCF	463
9	Kansas	461
10	Iowa State	334
11	BYU	318
12	Houston	215
13	Cincinnati	202
14	West Virginia	129

== Schedule ==
Oklahoma and the Big 12 announced the 2023 conference schedule on January 31, 2023. The 2023 schedule consists of 4 home games, 4 away games and 1 neutral-site game in the regular season. The Sooners will host 2 non-conference games against Arkansas State and SMU and will travel to Tulsa. Oklahoma will host Iowa State, UCF, West Virginia, and TCU, and travel to BYU, Cincinnati, Kansas, and Oklahoma State. Oklahoma will play Texas in Dallas, Texas at the Cotton Bowl Stadium in the Red River Showdown, the 119th game played in the series.

Date	Time	Opponent	Rank	Site	TV	Result	Attendance
September 2	11:00 a.m.	Arkansas State*	No. 20	Gaylord Family Oklahoma Memorial Stadium; Norman, OK	ESPN	W 73–0	83,221
September 9	5:00 p.m.	SMU*	No. 18	Gaylord Family Oklahoma Memorial Stadium; Norman, OK	ESPN+	W 28–11	84,186
September 16	2:30 p.m.	at Tulsa*	No. 19	Skelly Field at H. A. Chapman Stadium; Tulsa, OK	ESPN2	W 66–17	30,855
September 23	11:00 a.m.	at Cincinnati	No. 16	Nippert Stadium; Cincinnati, OH (Big Noon Kickoff)	Fox	W 20–6	38,139
September 30	6:00 p.m.	Iowa State	No. 14	Gaylord Family Oklahoma Memorial Stadium; Norman, OK	FS1	W 50–20	84,371
October 7	11:00 a.m.	vs. No. 3 Texas	No. 12	Cotton Bowl; Dallas, TX (Red River Showdown, College GameDay)	ABC	W 34–30	92,100
October 21	11:00 a.m.	UCF^{†}	No. 6	Gaylord Family Oklahoma Memorial Stadium; Norman, OK	ABC	W 31–29	83,476
October 28	11:00 a.m.	at Kansas	No. 6	David Booth Kansas Memorial Stadium; Lawrence, KS (Big Noon Kickoff)	Fox	L 33–38	47,233
November 4	2:30 p.m.	at No. 22 Oklahoma State	No. 9	Boone Pickens Stadium; Stillwater, OK (Bedlam Series)	ABC	L 24–27	54,105
November 11	6:00 p.m.	West Virginia	No. 17	Gaylord Family Oklahoma Memorial Stadium; Norman, OK	Fox	W 59–20	83,525
November 18	11:00 a.m.	at BYU	No. 14	LaVell Edwards Stadium; Provo, UT	ESPN	W 31–24	63,714
November 24	11:00 a.m.	TCU	No. 13	Gaylord Family Oklahoma Memorial Stadium; Norman, OK	Fox	W 69–45	83,669
December 28	8:15 p.m.	vs. No. 14 Arizona*	No. 12	Alamodome; San Antonio, TX (Alamo Bowl)	ESPN	L 24–38	55,853
*Non-conference game; ^{†}Homecoming; Rankings from AP Poll (and CFP Rankings, after October 31) – Released prior to game; All times are in Central time

== Roster ==
2023 Oklahoma Sooners Football
Quarterback: 8 Dillon Gabriel – (redshirt) senior (5'11, 204); 10 Jackson Arnold – freshman (6'1, 214); 11 Davis Beville – (redshirt) senior (6'6, 224); 14 General Booty – (redshirt) sophomore (6'2, 190); 20 Jacob Switzer – (redshirt) sophomore (6'2, 192); Running back: 0 Kalib Hicks – freshman (5'11, 206); 2 Jovantae Barnes – sophomore (6'0, 204); 7 Daylan Smothers – freshman (5'11, 190); 21 Braylon Colgrove – freshmen (5'8, 169); 22 Chapman McKown – freshman (5'5, 175); 23 Emeka Megwa – (redshirt) sophomore (6'0, 207); 24 Marcus Major – (redshirt) senior (6'0, 227); 27 Gavin Sawchuk – (redshirt) freshman (5'11, 198); 29 Tawee Walker – junior (5'9, 215); Wide receiver: 1 Jayden Gibson – sophomore (6'5, 193); 3 Jalil Farooq – junior (6'1, 204); 4 Nic Anderson – (redshirt) freshman (6'4, 209); 5 Andrel Anthony – junior (6'1, 192); 6 Lv Bunkley-Shelton – (redshirt) junior (5'11, 195); 9 D.J. Graham II – senior (6'0, 195); 12 Drake Stoops – (redshirt) graduate (5'10, 189); 13 J.J. Hester – (redshirt) junior (6'4, 196)'; 15 Brenen Thompson – sophomore (5'9, 155); 17 Jaquaize Pettaway – freshmen (5'10, 185); 82 Gavin Freeman – sophomore (5'8, 181); 83 Major Melson – (redshirt) junior (5'10, 183); 84 Brandon Harper – freshmen (5'7, 163); 85 Trey Brown – freshmen (5'9,177); 86 Patrick Cromer – freshmen (5'6, 144); 89 Eli Merck – freshmen (6'0, 192); Tight end: 16 Blake Smith – (redshirt) junior (6'4, 252); 18 Kaden Helms – (redshirt) freshman (6'5, 235); 19 Kade McIntyre – freshmen (6'3, 223); 45 Hampton Fay – (redshirt) sophomore (6'5, 241); 80 Josh Fanuiel – (redshirt) sophomore (6'3, 250); 81 Austin Stogner – senior (6'6, 255); 87 Jason Llewellyn – sophomore (6'5, 250); Long snapper: 50 Ben Anderson – (redshirt) freshman (6'5, 238); 58 Ethan Lane – (redshirt) junior (5'11, 233)	Offensive line: 52 Troy Everett – OL – (redshirt) sophomore (6'3, 297); 53 Caleb Shaffer – OL – (redshirt) senior (6'5, 342); 55 Aaryn Parks – OL – (redshirt) junior (6'4, 309); 57 Gunnar Allen – OL – (redshirt) freshman (6'0, 297); 59 Savion Byrd – OT – (redshirt) sophomore (6'5, 288); 60 Tyler Guyton – OL – (redshirt) junior (6'7, 327); 61 Kenneth Wermy – OL – freshmen (6'5, 322); 62 Drew Batt – OL – freshmen (6'3, 312); 64 Joshua Bates – OL – freshman (6'3, 312); 65 Ty Kubicek – OL – freshmen (6'2, 295); 66 C.J. Compton – OL – freshmen (6'3, 301); 69 Nate Anderson – OL – (redshirt) junior (6'4, 305); 70 Cayden Green – OL – freshman (6'5, 311); 71 Logan Howland – OL – freshmen (6'6, 288); 72 McKade Mettauer – OL – (redshirt) senior (6'4, 311); 73 Andrew Raym – OG – senior (6'4, 309); 75 Walter Rouse – OL – (redshirt) senior (6'6, 322); 76 Jacob Sexton – OL – sophomore (6'6, 325); 77 Heath Ozaeta – OL – freshmen (6'5, 304); 79 Jake Taylor – OL – freshman (6'6, 312); Defensive line: 8 Jonah Laulu – DE – (redshirt) graduate (6'5, 292); 14 Reggie Grimes II – DE – senior (6'4, 274); 30 Trace Ford – DL – (redshirt) senior (6'2, 257); 32 R Mason Thomas – DL – sophomore (6'2, 239); 33 Marcus Stripling – DE – senior (6'3, 250); 34 Adepoju Adebawore – DL – freshman (6'4, 241); 40 Ethan Downs – DL – junior (6'4, 263); 44 Kelvin Gilliam – DL – (redshirt) sophomore (6'3, 299); 54 Jacob Lacey – DL – (redshirt) senior (6'1, 280); 55 Ashton Sanders – DL – freshman (6'1, 284); 56 Gracen Halton – DL – sophomore (6'2, 287); 80 Rondell Bothroyd – DL – (redshirt) senior (6'3, 275); 88 Jordan Kelley – DT – (redshirt) graduate (6'4, 302); 90 Taylor Wein – DL – freshmen (6'4, 242); 91 Drew Heining – DL –freshmen (6'5, 264); 93 Phil Paea – DL – (redshirt) senior (6'3, 305); 94 Isaiah Coe – DL – (redshirt) senior (6'2, 314); 95 Da'Jon Terry – DL – (redshirt) senior (6'3, 321); 96 Davon Sears – DL – (redshirt) senior (6'2, 287); 98 Hayden Bray – DL – (redshirt) sophomore (6'4, 275); 99 Abdelrahman Assaf – DL – sophomore (6'0, 220)	Linebacker: 1 Dasan McCullough – sophomore (6'5, 227); 7 Jaren Kanak – sophomore (6'2, 232); 10 Kip Lewis – (redshirt) freshmen (6'1, 208); 11 Kobie McKinzie – (redshirt) freshman (6'2, 241); 13 Shane Whitter – (redshirt) junior (6'0, 231); 17 Taylor Heim – freshmen (6'6, 202); 20 Lewis Carter – freshman (6'0, 213); 24 Samuel Omosigho – freshmen (6'2, 219); 28 Danny Stutsman – junior (6'4, 241); 38 Owen Heinecke – (redshirt) sophomore (6'2, 218); 42 Konnor Near – (redshirt) senior (6'1, 232); 50 Phil Picciotti – freshman (6'3, 242); 53 Reed DeQuasie – freshmen (6'1, 191); 97 Kyle Carlson – freshmen (6'3, 195); Defensive back: 2 Billy Bowman Jr. – DB – junior (5'10, 194); 3 Robert Spears-Jennings – S – sophomore (6'1, 218); 4 Justin Harrington – DB – (redshirt) graduate (6'3, 212); 5 Woodi Washington – CB – (redshirt) senior (5'11, 202); 6 Makari Vickers – DB – freshmen (6'1, 200); 9 Gentry Williams – DB – sophomore (6'0, 182); 12 Key Lawrence – DB – senior (6'1, 203); 15 Kendal Dolby – DB – junior (5'11, 184); 18 Erik McCarty – DB – freshmen (6'1, 191); 19 Jacobe Johnson – DB – freshmen (6'2, 192); 21 Reggie Pearson – DB – (redshirt) senior (5'10, 198); 22 Peyton Bowen – DB – freshman (6'0, 199); 23 Josiah Wagoner – DB – freshmen (5'11, 177); 25 Daeh McCullough – DB – freshmen (6'1, 178); 26 Kani Walker – CB – (redshirt) sophomore (6'2, 202); 27 Jayden Rowe – DB – (redshirt) freshman (6'2, 224); 29 Casen Calmus – DB – freshmen (5'10, 187); 31 Cale Fugate – DB – freshmen (5'10, 188); 35 Jakeb Snyder – DB – freshmen (5'8, 177); 39 Peter Schuh – DB – (redshirt) freshman (5'8, 182); 41 Emmett Jones III – DB – freshmen (6'0, 175); 46 Gabriel McDaniel – CB – (redshirt) junior (5'10, 169); 49 Pierce Hudgens – DB – (redshirt) junior (6'1, 204); Placekicker: 34 Zach Schmit – (redshirt) junior (5'10, 194); 36 Josh Plaster – (redshirt) senior (6'0, 200); 43 Redi Mustafaraj – (redshirt) sophomore (6'2, 210); 46 Gavin Marshall – (redshirt) freshman (6'1, 193); Punter: 31 Ashton Logan – (redshirt) freshmen (6'2, 210); 48 Luke Elziga – (redshirt) senior (6'4, 213)

== Coaching staff ==
Name	Position	Consecutive years
Brent Venables	Head coach	2nd
Jeff Lebby	Offensive coordinator/Quarterbacks	2nd
Ted Roof	Defensive coordinator/Linebackers	2nd
Todd Bates	Associate head coach/Co-defensive coordinator/Run defense/Defensive tackles	2nd
Bill Bedenbaugh	Offensive line	11th
Miguel Chavis	Defensive ends	2nd
Joe Jon Finley	Tight ends	3rd
Emmett Jones	Passing game coordinator/Wide receivers	1st
Brandon Hall	Safeties	2nd
DeMarco Murray	Running backs	4th
Jay Valai	Co-defensive coordinator/Pass defense/ Cornerbacks & nickelbacks	2nd
Jerry Schmidt	Director of sports enhancement & strength and conditioning	2nd

Source: 2023 Oklahoma Sooners Roster

After serving as the interim wide receivers coach last season, L'Damian Washington joined Western Kentucky as the full-time wide receivers coach following Emmett Jones's hiring to the same position.

=== Spring game ===
2023 Oklahoma Spring Game

Quarter	1	2	3	4	Total
White	51	9	12	12	84
Red	19	36	17	10	82

at Gaylord Family Oklahoma Memorial Stadium • Norman, OK

- Date: Saturday, April 22, 2023
- Game time: 2:30 p.m. CDT
- Game attendance: 54,409

== Game summaries ==
=== Arkansas State ===
Arkansas State Red Wolves (0–0) vs. No. 20 Oklahoma Sooners (0–0)

Quarter	1	2	3	4	Total
Arkansas State	0	0	0	0	0
No. 20 Oklahoma	28	17	21	7	73

at Gaylord Family Oklahoma Memorial Stadium • Norman, OK

- Date: Saturday, September 2, 2023
- Game time: 11:00 a.m. CDT
- Game weather: • Sunny Temperature: 83
- Game attendance: 83,221
- Referee: Jonathan Noll
- TV announcers (ESPN): Roy Philpott (play-by-play), Roddy Jones (analyst) & Taylor McGregor (sideline)

Game information

First quarter

- (13:41) OKLA – Drake Stoops 10 yard pass from Dillon Gabriel, Zach Schmit kick (Drive: 5 plays, 70 yards, 1:19; OKLA 7–0)
- (12:38) OKLA – Gavin Freeman 82 yard punt return, Zach Schmit kick (Drive: 0 plays, 82 yards; OKLA 14–0)
- (7:50) OKLA – Marcus Major 2 yard rush, Zach Schmit kick (Drive: 10 plays, 80 yards, 3:34; OKLA 21–0)
- (0:31) OKLA – Gavin Freeman 7 yard pass from Dillon Gabriel, Zach Schmit kick (Drive: 13 plays, 73 yards, 4:23; OKLA 28–0)

Second quarter

- (12:21) OKLA – Tawee Walker 1 yard rush, Zach Schmit kick (Drive: 6 plays, 70 yards, 2:12; OKLA 35–0)
- (8:33) OKLA – Dillon Gabriel 5 yard rush, Zach Schmit kick (Drive: 5 plays, 74 yards, 2:05; OKLA 42–0)
- (0:37) OKLA – Zach Schmit 21 yard Field goal (Drive: 11 plays, 82 yards, 5:53; OKLA 45–0)

Third quarter

- (9:46) OKLA – Tawee Walker 1 yard rush, Zach Schmit kick (Drive: 10 plays, 65 yards, 3:54; OKLA 52–0)
- (6:29) OKLA – Jayden Gibson 21 yard pass from Jackson Arnold, Zach Schmit kick (Drive: 4 plays, 62 yards, 1:34; OKLA 59–0)
- (3:45) OKLA – Jackson Arnold 7 yard rush, Gavin Marshall kick (Drive: 5 plays, 34 yards, 2:27; OKLA 66–0)

Fourth quarter

- (9:43) OKLA – Kalib Hicks 6 yard rush, Gavin Marshall kick (Drive: 11 plays, 67 yards, 7:22; OKLA 73–0)

Statistics	ASU	OKLA
First downs	10	36
Total yards	208	642
Rushes/yards	23/48	49/220
Passing yards	160	422
Passing: Comp–Att–Int	13–27	30–33
Time of possession	23:04	36:56

Team	Category	Player	Statistics
Arkansas State	Passing	J. T. Shrout	12/26, 148 yards
Arkansas State	Rushing	Jaxon Dailey	3 carries, 11 yards
Arkansas State	Receiving	Courtney Jackson	3 receptions, 66 yards
Oklahoma	Passing	Dillon Gabriel	19/22, 308 yards, 2 TD's
Oklahoma	Rushing	Jovantae Barnes	13 carries, 49 yards
Oklahoma	Receiving	Jaquaize Pettaway	9 receptions, 56 yards

=== SMU ===
SMU Mustangs (1–0) vs. No. 18 Oklahoma Sooners (1–0)

Quarter	1	2	3	4	Total
SMU	3	0	0	8	11
No. 18 Oklahoma	7	7	0	14	28

at Gaylord Family Oklahoma Memorial Stadium • Norman, OK

- Date: Saturday, September 9, 2023
- Game time: 5:00 p.m. CDT
- Game weather: • Sunny Temperature: 91
- Game attendance: 84,186
- Referee: Michael VanderVelde
- TV announcers (ESPN+): Shawn Kenney (play-by-play), Ryan Leaf (analyst) & Tori Petry (sideline)

Game information

First quarter

- (10:39) OKLA – Anthony Andrel 29 yard pass from Dillon Gabriel, Zach Schmit kick (Drive: 3 plays, 40 yards, 1:04; OKLA 7–0)
- (8:43) SMU – Collin Rogers 27 yard FG (Drive: 8 plays, 65 yards, 1:56; OKLA 7–3)

Second quarter

- (8:33) OKLA – Blake Smith 2 yard pass from Dillon Gabriel, Zach Schmit kick (Drive: 13 plays, 94 yards, 4:53; OKLA 14–3)

Third quarter

- No Score

Fourth quarter

- (12:09) SMU – Eby Stone 2 yard pass from Preston Stone, Jake Bailey 3 yard pass from Preston Stone (Drive:13 plays, 76 yards, 6:56; OKLA 14–11)
- (9:01) OKLA – Jalil Farooq 21 yard pass from Dillon Gabriel, Zach Schmit kick (Drive: 10 plays, 75 yards, 3:08; OKLA 21–11)
- (6:40) OKLA – Marcus Major 27 yards pass from Dillon Gabriel, Zach Schmit kick (Drive: 3 plays, 30 yards, 0:51; OKLA 28–11)

Statistics	SMU	OKLA
First downs	21	21
Total yards	367	354
Rushes/yards	34/117	44/181
Passing yards	250	176
Passing: Comp–Att–Int	26–45–1	19–27
Time of possession	32:20	26:00

Team	Category	Player	Statistics
SMU	Passing	Preston Stone	26/45, 250 yards, 1 TD, 1 INT
SMU	Rushing	Jaylan Knighton	15 carries, 76 yards
SMU	Receiving	Jake Bailey	7 receptions, 73 yards
Oklahoma	Passing	Dillon Gabriel	19/27, 176 yards,4 TD's
Oklahoma	Rushing	Tawee Walker	20 carries, 107 yards
Oklahoma	Receiving	Andrel Anthony	7 receptions, 76 yards, 1 TD

=== At Tulsa ===
No. 19 Oklahoma Sooners (2–0) vs. Tulsa Golden Hurricane (1–1)

Quarter	1	2	3	4	Total
No. 19 Oklahoma	28	10	21	7	66
Tulsa	0	14	3	0	17

at Skelly Field at H. A. Chapman Stadium • Tulsa, OK

- Date: Saturday, September 16, 2023
- Game time: 2:30 p.m. CDT
- Game weather: • Cloudy Temperature: 79
- Game attendance: 30,855
- Referee: Tutashinda Salaam
- TV announcers (ESPN2): Dave Flemming (play-by-play), Brock Osweiler (analyst) & Kayla Burton (sideline)

Game information

First Quarter

- (12:31) OKLA – Jalil Farooq 34 yard pass from Dillon Gabriel, Zach Schmit kick (Drive: 2 plays, 84 yards, 0:42; OKLA 7–0)
- (4:49) OKLA – Drake Stoops 4 yard pass from Dillon Gabriel, Zach Schmit kick (Drive: 11 plays, 92 yards, 4:14; OKLA 14–0)
- (3:34) OKLA – Danny Stutsman 30 yard interception return, Zach Schmit kick (Drive: 3 plays, 6 yards, 1:15; OKLA 21–0)
- (1:25) OKLA – Drake Stoops 4 yard pass from Dillon Gabriel, Zach Schmit kick (Drive: 4 plays, 37 yards, 1:19; OKLA 28–0)

Second Quarter

- (12:30) TUL – Marquis Shoulders 19 yard pass from Cardell Williams, Chase Meyer kick (Drive: 11 plays, 75 yards, 3:55; OKLA 28–7)
- (9:32) OKLA – Nick Anderson 28 yard pass from Dillon Gabriel, Zach Schmit kick (Drive: 8 plays, 78 yards, 2:52; OKLA 35–7)
- (5:30) TUL – Devan Williams 18 yard pass from Cardell Williams, Chase Meyer kick (Drive: 10 plays, 82 yards, 3:58; OKLA 35–14)
- (0:00) OKLA – Zach Schmit 20 yard field goal (Drive: 11 plays, 73 yards, 3:30; OKLA 38–14)

Third Quarter

- (9:54) TUL – Chase Meyer 21 yard field goal (Drive: 11 plays, 73 yards, 5:06; OKLA 38–17)
- (7:08) OKLA – Nick Anderson 42 yard pass from Dillion Gabriel, Zach Schmit kick (Drive: 6 plays, 73 yards, 2:38; OKLA 45–17)
- (3:23) OKLA – Jovantae Barnes 1 yard rush, Zach Schmit kick (Drive: 7 plays, 42 yards, 2:06; OKLA 52–17)
- (2:07) OKLA – Nick Anderson 50 yard pass from Jackson Arnold, Zach Schmit kick (Drive: 1 plays, 50 yards, 0:08; OKLA 59–17)

Fourth Quarter

- (14:09) OKLA – Gavin Sawchuk 1 yard rush, Zach Schmit kick (Drive: 2 plays, 4 yards, 0:43; OKLA 66–17)

Statistics	OKLA	TUL
First downs	27	17
Total yards	595	292
Rushes/yards	28/119	46/75
Passing yards	476	217
Passing: Comp–Att–Int	30–35–1	17–27–5
Time of possession	26:54	33:06

Team	Category	Player	Statistics
Oklahoma	Passing	Dillon Gabriel	28/31, 421 yards, 5 TD's, 1 INT
Oklahoma	Rushing	Jovantae Barnes	13 carries, 68 yards, 1 TD
Oklahoma	Receiving	Drake Stoops	8 receptions, 53 yards, 2 TD's
Tulsa	Passing	Cardell Williams	11/17, 196 yards, 2 TD's, 2 INT's
Tulsa	Rushing	Bill Jackson	10 carries, 40 yards
Tulsa	Receiving	Devan Williams	6 receptions, 71 yards, 1 TD

=== At Cincinnati ===
No. 16 Oklahoma Sooners (3–0) vs. Cincinnati Bearcats (2–1)

Quarter	1	2	3	4	Total
No. 16 Oklahoma	7	3	7	3	20
Cincinnati	3	0	3	0	6

at Nippert Stadium • Cincinnati, OH

- Date: Saturday, September 23, 2023
- Game time: 11:00 a.m. CDT
- Game weather: Sunny • Temperature: 70 °F (21 °C) • Wind: 8 mph
- Game attendance: 38,193
- Referee: Kevin Mar
- TV announcers (FOX): Gus Johnson (Play-by-Play), Joel Klatt (analyst), Jenny Taft (sideline)

Game information

First Quarter

- (7:39) CIN – Carter Brown 40 yard field goal (Drive: 9 plays, 37 yards, 3:45; CIN 3–0)
- (0:34) OKLA – Nic Anderson 5 yard pass from Dillon Gabriel, Zach Schmit kick (Drive: 6 plays, 66 yards, 1:47; OKLA 7–3)

Second Quarter

- (8:40) OKLA – Zach Schmit 34 yard field goal (Drive: 12 plays, 72 yards, 4:51; OKLA 10–3)

Third Quarter

- (8:22) CIN – Carter Brown 54 yard field goal (Drive: 12 plays, 49 yards, 4:32; OKLA 10–6)
- (5:23) OKLA – Dillon Gabriel 1 yard rush, Zach Schmit kick (Drive: 9 plays, 75 yards, 2:59; OKLA 17–6)

Fourth Quarter

(11:02) OKLA – Zach Schmit 30 yard field goal (Drive: 9 plays, 67 yards, 4:33; OKLA 20–6)

Statistics	OKLA	CIN
First downs	21	21
Total yards	427	376
Rushes/yards	34/105	37/141
Passing yards	322	235
Passing: Comp–Att–Int	26–38	22–42–2
Time of possession	27:35	32:25

Team	Category	Player	Statistics
Oklahoma	Passing	Dillon Gabriel	26/38, 322 yards, 1 TD
Oklahoma	Rushing	Marcus Major	15 carries, 63 yards
Oklahoma	Receiving	Andrel Anthony	7 receptions, 117 yards
Cincinnati	Passing	Emory Jones	22/41, 235 yards, 2 INT
Cincinnati	Rushing	Emory Jones	15 carries, 42 yards
Cincinnati	Receiving	Chamon Metayer	3 receptions, 50 yards

=== Iowa State ===
Iowa State Cyclones (2–2) vs. No. 14 Oklahoma Sooners (4–0)

Quarter	1	2	3	4	Total
Iowa State	10	10	0	0	20
No. 14 Oklahoma	21	19	7	3	50

at Gaylord Family Oklahoma Memorial Stadium • Norman, OK

- Date: Saturday, September 30, 2023
- Game time: 6:00 p.m.CDT
- Game weather: • Sunny Temperature: 90
- Game attendance: 84,371
- Referee: Stephen Baron
- TV announcers (FS1): Jeff Levering (play-by-play) & Mark Helfrich (analyst)

Game information

First quarter

- (14:03) OKLA – Billy Bowman 44 yard interception return, Zach Schmit kick (Drive: 3 plays, 75 yards, 0:57; OKLA 7–0)
- (10:50) ISU – Jaylin Noel 51 yard pass from Rocco Becht, Chase Contreraz kick (Drive: 6 plays, 75 yards, 3:13; Tied 7–7)
- (6:27) OKLA – Dillon Gabriel 1 yard rush, Zach Schmit kick (Drive: 10 plays, 75 yards, 4:23; OKLA 14–7)
- (2:14) ISU – Chase Contreraz 35 yard field goal (Drive: 10 plays, 58 yards, 4:13; OKLA 14–10)
- (0:26) OKLA – Nic Anderson 39 yard pass from Dillon Gabriel, Zach Schmit kick (Drive: 6 plays, 75 yards, 1:42; OKLA 21–10)

Second quarter

- (14:55) ISU – Jayden Higgins 67 yard pass from Rocco Becht, Chase Contreraz kick (Drive: 3 plays, 75 yards, 0:31; OKLA 21–17)
- (9:06) ISU – Chase Contreraz 48 yard field goal (Drive: 9 plays, 50 yards, 3:59; OKLA 21–20
- (6:49) OKLA – Dillon Gabriel 6 yard rush, Zach Schmit kick (Drive: 6 plays, 75 yards, 2:17; OKLA 28–20)
- (6:06) OKLA – Safety (Drive: 4 plays, – 5 yards, 0:43; OKLA 30–20)
- (3:32) OKLA – Zach Schmit 46 yard field goal (Drive: 8 plays, 30 yards, 2:28; OKLA 33–20)
- (0:07) OKLA – Drake Stoops 3 yard pass from Dillon Gabriel, Zach Schmit kick (Drive: 7 plays, 43 yards, 1:59; OKLA 40–20)

Third quarter

- (12:26) OKLA – Jayden Gibson 41 yard pass from Dillon Gabriel, Zac Schmit kick (Drive: 8 plays, 85 yards, 2:29; OKLA 47–20)

Fourth quarter

- (8:41) OKLA – Zach Schmit 30 yard field goal (Drive: 14 plays, 51 yards, 6:45; OKLA 50–20)

Statistics	ISU	OKLA
First downs	16	30
Total yards	352	523
Rushes/yards	27/150	41/157
Passing yards	202	366
Passing: Comp–Att–Int	19–37–2	26–39–1
Time of possession	23:30	33:04

Team	Category	Player	Statistics
Iowa State	Passing	Rocco Becht	15/33, 188 yards, 2 TD, 2 INT
Iowa State	Rushing	Abu Sama	7 carries, 67 yards
Iowa State	Receiving	Jaylin Noel	4 receptions, 48 yards, 1 TD
Oklahoma	Passing	Dillon Gabriel	26/39, 366 yards, 3 TD, 1 INT
Oklahoma	Rushing	Marcus Major	19 carries, 66 yards
Oklahoma	Receiving	Jalil Farooq	5 receptions, 81 yards

=== No. 3 Texas ===
No. 12 Oklahoma Sooners (5–0) vs. No. 3 Texas Longhorns (5–0)

Quarter	1	2	3	4	Total
No. 12 Oklahoma	7	13	7	7	34
No. 3 Texas	7	10	3	10	30

at Cotton Bowl Stadium • Dallas, TX

- Date: Saturday, October 7, 2023
- Game time: 11:00 a.m. CDT
- Game weather: Sunny • Temperature: 63 °F (17 °C)
- Game attendance: 92,100
- Referee: David Alvarez
- TV announcers (ABC): Chris Fowler (play-by-play), Kirk Herbstreit (analyst) & Holly Rowe (sideline)

Game information

First Quarter

- (13:11) OKLA – Dillon Gabriel 9 yard rush, Zach Schmit kick (Drive: 5 plays, 22 yards, 1:03; OKLA 7–0)
- (9:02) TEX – Josh Plaster punt block recovered by Malik Muhammad, Bert Auburn kick (Drive: 3 plays −3 yards, 0:59; Tied 7–7)

Second Quarter

- (14:14) OKLA – Zach Schmit 27 yard field goal (Drive: 13 plays, 78 yards, 4:34; OKLA 10–7)
- (9:27) TEX – Gunnar Helm 22 yard pass from Quinn Ewers, Bert Auburn kick (Drive: 9 plays, 85 yards, 4:41; TEX 14–10)
- (5:23) OKLA – Tawee Walker 1 yard rush, Zach Schmit kick (Drive: 10 plays, 75 yards, 4:04; OKLA 17–14)
- (1:53) TEX – Auburn Bert 25 yard field goal (Drive: 10 plays, 68 yards, 3:30; Tied 17–17)
- (0:00) OKLA – Zach Schmit 26 yard field goal (Drive: 9 plays, 67 yards, 1:53; OKLA 20–17)

Third Quarter

- (10:21) OKLA – Tawee Walker 1 yard rush, Zach Schmit kick (Drive: 13 plays, 75 yards, 4:39; OKLA 27–17)
- (1:53) TEX – Auburn Bert 45 yard field goal (Drive: 10 plays, 67 yards, 4:17; OKLA 27–20)

Fourth Quarter

- (6:10) TEX – Jonathon Brooks 29 yard rush, Bert Aubrun kick (Drive: 5 plays, 73 yards, 1:45; Tied 27–27)
- (1:17) TEX – Auburn Bert 47 yard field goal (Drive: 11 plays, 58 yards, 3:32; TEX 30–27)
- (0:15) OKLA – Nic Anderson 3 yard pass from Dillon Gabriel, Zach Schmit kick (Drive: 5 plays, 75 yards, 1:02; OKLA 34–30)

Statistics	OKLA	TEX
First downs	28	25
Total yards	486	527
Rushes/yards	43/201	40/156
Passing yards	285	371
Passing: Comp–Att–Int	23–38	32–38–2
Time of possession	27:49	32:11

Team	Category	Player	Statistics
Oklahoma	Passing	Dillon Gabriel	23/38, 285 yards, 1 TD
Oklahoma	Rushing	Dillon Gabriel	14 carries, 113 yards, 1 TD
Oklahoma	Receiving	Jalil Farooq	5 receptions, 130 yards
Texas	Passing	Quinn Ewers	31/37, 346 yards, 1 TD, 2 INT
Texas	Rushing	Jonathon Brooks	22 carries, 129 yards, 1 TD
Texas	Receiving	Jordan Whittington	10 receptions, 115 yards

=== UCF ===
UCF Knights (3–3) vs. No. 6 Oklahoma Sooners (6–0)

Quarter	1	2	3	4	Total
UCF	0	17	6	6	29
No. 6 Oklahoma	7	10	0	14	31

at Gaylord Family Oklahoma Memorial Stadium • Norman, OK

- Date: Saturday, October 21, 2023
- Game time: 11:00 a.m. CDT
- Game weather: Sunny • Temperature: 72 °F (22 °C)
- Game attendance: 83,476
- Referee: Derek Anderson
- TV announcers (ABC): Dave Pasch (play-by-play), Dusty Dvoracek (analyst) & Tom Luginbill (sideline)
- Gamecast

Game information

First quarter

- (7:48) OKLA – Nic Anderson 29 yard pass from Dillon Gabriel, Zach Schmit kick (Drive: 3 plays, 45 yards, 0:51; OKLA 7–0)

Second quarter

- (11:49) UCF – John Rhys Plumlee 1 yard rush, Colton Boomer kick (Drive: 10 plays, 74 yards, 4:04; Tied 7–7)
- (4:01) UCF – Colton Boomer 21 yard field goal (Drive: 12 plays, 76 yards, 6:04; UCF 10–7)
- (1:51) OKLA – Nic Anderson 42 yard pass from Dillon Gabriel, Zach Schmit kick (Drive: 8 plays, 75 yards, 2:04; OKLA 14–10)
- (1:24) UCF – Javon Baker 86 yard pass from John Rhys Plumlee, Colton Boomer kick (Drive: 2 plays, 86 yards, 0:19; UCF 17–14)
- (0:00) OKLA – Zach Schmit 25 yard field goal (Drive: 1 plays, 0:02 Tied 17–17)

Third quarter

- (11:51) UCF – Colton Boomer 48 yard field goal (Drive: 4 plays, 2 yards, 1:29; UCF 20–17)
- (5:28) UCF – Colton Boomer 46 yard field goal (Drive: 10 plays, 57 yards, 4:18; UCF 23–17)

Fourth quarter

- (9:16) OKLA – Drake Stoops 11 yard pass from Dillon Gabriel, Zach Schmit kick (Drive: 9 plays, 65 yards, 2:15; OKLA 24–23)
- (3:13) OKLA – Gavin Sawchuk 30 yard rush, Zach Schmit kick (Drive: 9 plays, 80 yards, 4:17; OKLA 31–23)
- (1:16) UCF – Javon Baker 12 yard pass from john Rhys Plumlee (Drive: 9 plays, 75 yards, 1:57; OKLA 31–29)

Statistics	UCF	OKLA
First downs	20	30
Total yards	397	442
Rushes/yards	41/149	46/189
Passing yards	248	253
Passing: Comp–Att–Int	16–30	25–38–1
Time of possession	30:16	29:44

Team	Category	Player	Statistics
UCF	Passing	John Rhys Plumlee	16/30, 248 yards, 2 TD's
UCF	Rushing	RJ Harvey	23 carries, 101 yards
UCF	Receiving	Javon Baker	5 receptions, 134 yards, 2 TD
Oklahoma	Passing	Dillon Gabriel	25/38, 253 yards, 3 TD, 1 INT
Oklahoma	Rushing	Marcus Major	18 carries, 82 yards
Oklahoma	Receiving	Drake Stoops	7 receptions, 60 yards, 1 TD

=== At Kansas ===
No. 6 Oklahoma Sooners (7–0) vs. Kansas Jayhawks (5–2)

Quarter	1	2	3	4	Total
No. 6 Oklahoma	0	21	6	6	33
Kansas	7	10	9	12	38

at David Booth Kansas Memorial Stadium • Lawrence, KS

- Date: Saturday, October 28, 2023
- Game time: 11:00 a.m. CDT
- Game weather: • Cloudy Temperature: 38 °F (3 °C)
- Game attendance: 47,233
- Referee: Michael VanderVelde
- TV announcers (FOX): Jason Benetti (play-by-play), Brock Huard (analyst) & Allison Williams (sideline)

Game information

First Quarter

- (9:25) KAN – Ra'Mello Dotson 37 yard interception return, Seth Keller kick (Drive: 3 plays, 8 yards, 0:28; KAN 7–0)

Second Quarter

- (14:06) KAN – Daniel Hishaw 9 yard rush, Seth Keller kick (Drive: 10 plays, 79 yards, 5:20; KAN 14–0)
- (10:15) OKLA – Dillon Gabriel 7 yard rush, Zach Schmit kick (Drive: 10 plays, 75 yards, 3:54; KAN 14–7)
- (6:05) OKLA – Tawee Walker 2 yard rush, Zach Schmit kick (Drive: 9 plays, 66 yards, 3:11; Tied 14–14)
- (4:25) OKLA – Dillon Gabriel 9 yard rush, Zach Schmit kick (Drive: 4 plays, 17 yards, 1:38; OKLA 21–14)
- (0:48) KAN – Seth Keller 24 yard field goal (Drive: 12 plays, 79 yards, 3:28; OKLA 21–17)

Third Quarter

- (4:01) KAN – Seth Keller 29 yard field goal (Drive: 5 plays, 45 yards, 2:45; OKLA 21–20)
- (3:03) KAN – Jason Bean 38 yard rush (Drive: 1 plays, 38 yards, 0:08; KAN 26–21)
- (0:35) OKLA – Gavin Sawchuck 3 yard rush (Drive: 7 plays, 75 yards, 2:28; OKLA 27–26)

Fourth Quarter

- (12:25) KAN – David Hishaw 1 yard rush (Drive: 7 plays, 65 yards, 3:03; KAN 32–27)
- (5:22) OKLA – Dillon Gabriel 1 yard rush (Drive; 4 plays, 14 yards, 1:23; OKLA 33–32)
- (0:55) KAN – Devin Neal 9 yard rush (Drive: 7 plays, 80 yards, 0:00; KAN 38–33)

Statistics	OKLA	KAN
First downs	19	25
Total yards	440	443
Rushes/yards	55/269	41/225
Passing yards	171	218
Passing: Comp–Att–Int	14–19–1	15–32–2
Time of possession	28:50	27:07

Team	Category	Player	Statistics
Oklahoma	Passing	Dillon Gabriel	14/19, 171 yards, 1 INT
Oklahoma	Rushing	Tawee Walker	23 carries, 146 yards, 1 TD
Oklahoma	Receiving	Drake Stoops	4 receptions, 76 yards
Kansas	Passing	Jason Bean	15/32, 218 yards, 2 INT
Kansas	Rushing	Devin Neal	25 carries, 112 yards, 1 TD
Kansas	Receiving	Lawrence Arnold	3 receptions, 79 yards

=== At No.22 Oklahoma State ===
No. 9 Oklahoma Sooners (7–1) vs. No. 22 Oklahoma State Cowboys (6–2)

Quarter	1	2	3	4	Total
No. 9 Oklahoma	7	7	7	3	24
No. 22 Oklahoma State	7	10	0	10	27

at Boone Pickens Stadium • Stillwater, OK

- Date: Saturday, November 4, 2023
- Game time: 2:30 p.m. CDT
- Game weather: • Sunny Temperature: 71
- Game attendance: 54,105
- Referee: Hank Johns
- TV announcers (ABC): Dave Pasch (play-by-play), Dusty Dvoracek (analyst) & Tom Luginbill (sideline)

Game information

First Quarter

- (11:39 OSU – Ollie Gordon II 20 yard rush, Alex Hale kick (Drive: 8 plays, 73 yards, 3:21; OSU 7–0)
- (10:51) OKLA – Gavin Sawchuk 64 yard rush, Zach Schmit kick (Drive: 3 plays, 75 yards, 0:48; Tied 7–7)

Second Quarter

- (14:53) OSU – Alan Bowman 13 yard rush, Alex Hale kick (Drive: 10 plays, 57 yards, 5:17; OSU 14–7)
- (9:42) OSU – Alex Hale 36 yard field goal (Drive: 10 plays, 55 yards, 3:52; OSU 17–7)
- (7:06) OKLA – Drake Stoops 6 yard pass from Dillon Gabriel, Zach Schmit kick (Drive: 9 plays, 75 yards, 2:36; OSU 17–14)

Third Quarter

- (8:05) OKLA – Tawee Walker 23 yard rush, Zach Schmit kick (Drive: 7 plays, 84 yards, 2:52; OKLA 21–17)

Fourth Quarter

- (7:59) OSU – Ollie Gordon II 1 yard rush, Alex Hale kick (Drive: 8 plays, 97 yards, 4:43; OSU 24–21)
- (6:59) OSU – Alex Hale 34 yard field goal (Drive: 4 plays, 3 yards, 0:53; OSU 27–21)
- (4:48) OKLA – Zach Schmit 36 yard field goal (Drive: 6 plays, 57 yards, 2:11; OSU 27–24)

Statistics	OKLA	OKST
First downs	21	27
Total yards	492	480
Rushes/yards	27/148	38/146
Passing yards	344	334
Passing: Comp–Att–Int	26–37–1	28–43–1
Time of possession	22:46	37:14

Team	Category	Player	Statistics
Oklahoma	Passing	Dillon Gabriel	26/37, 344 yards, 1 TD, 1 INT
Oklahoma	Rushing	Gavin Sawchuk	13 carries, 111 yards, 1 TD
Oklahoma	Receiving	Drake Stoops	12 receptions, 134 yards, 1 TD
Oklahoma State	Passing	Alan Bowman	28/42, 334 yards, 1 INT
Oklahoma State	Rushing	Ollie Gordon II	33 carries, 137 yards, 2 TD
Oklahoma State	Receiving	Rashod Owens	10 receptions, 136 yards

=== West Virginia ===
West Virginia Mountaineers (6–3) vs. No. 17 Oklahoma Sooners (7–2)

Quarter	1	2	3	4	Total
West Virginia	7	7	6	0	20
No. 17 Oklahoma	14	17	14	14	59

at Gaylord Family Oklahoma Memorial Stadium • Norman, OK

- Date: Saturday, November 11, 2023
- Game time: 6:00 p.m. CST
- Game weather: • Sunny Temperature: 55
- Game attendance: 83,525
- Referee: Kevin Mar
- TV announcers (FOX): Jeff Levering (play-by-play) & Mark Helfrich (analyst)

Game information

First quarter

- (11:00) WVU – CJ Donaldson 13 yard rush, Michael Hayes kick (Drive: 8 plays, 75 yards, 4:00; WVU 7–0)
- (8:27) OKLA – Dillon Gabriel 2 yard rush, Zach Schmit kick (Drive: 8 plays, 75 yards, 2:33; Tied 7–7)
- (3:16) OKLA – Dillon Gabriel 2 yard rush, Zach Schmit kick (Drive: 11 plays, 65 yards, 3:26; OKLA 14–7)

Second quarter

- (13:58) OKLA – Zach Schmit 23 yard field goal (Drive: 6 plays, 65 yards, 1:20; OKLA 17–7)
- (9:06) OKLA – Austin Stogner 3 yard pass from Dillon Gabriel, Zach Schmit kick (Drive: 9 plays, 46 yards, 2:57; OKLA 24–7)
- (6:20) OKLA – Jaden Gibson 32 yard pass from Dillon Gabriel, Zach Schmit kick (Drive: 5 plays, 86 yards, 1:49; OKLA 31–7)
- (0:07) WVU – Kole Taylor 3 yard pass from Garrett Greene, Michael Hayes kick (Drive: 6 plays, 75 yards, 0:53; OKLA 31–14)

Third quarter

- (13:48) OKLA – Drake Stoops 60 yard pass from Dillon Gabriel, Zach Schmit kick (Drive: 4 plays, 75 yards, 1:12; OKLA 38–14)
- (9:28) WVU – Devin Carter 7 yard pass from Garrett Green, Garrett Greene 2 pt conversion failed (Drive: 12 plays, 61 yards, 4:14; OKLA 38–20)
- (4:34) OKLA – Drake Stoops 9 yard pass from Dillon Gabriel, Zach Schmit kick (Drive: 6 plays, 43 yards, 1:53; OKLA 45–20)

Fourth quarter

- (13:46) OKLA – Drake Stoops 9 yard pass from Dillon Gabriel, Zach Schmit kick (Drive: 7 plays, 81 yards, 3:20; OKLA 52–20)
- (7:59) OKLA – Dillon Gabriel 5 yard rush, Zach Schmit kick (Drive: 10 plays, 65 yards, 4:37; OKLA 59–20)

Statistics	WVU	OKLA
First downs	17	25
Total yards	330	664
Rushes/yards	41/176	42/221
Passing yards	154	423
Passing: Comp–Att–Int	10–31–2	23–36
Time of possession	30:32	29:28

Team	Category	Player	Statistics
West Virginia	Passing	Garrett Greene	10/27, 154 yards, 2 TD, 1 INT
West Virginia	Rushing	CJ Donaldson	14 carries, 79 yards, 1 TD
West Virginia	Receiving	Devin Carter	3 receptions, 67 yards, 1 TD
Oklahoma	Passing	Dillon Gabriel	23/36, 423 yards, 5 TD
Oklahoma	Rushing	Gavin Sawchuk	22 carries, 135 yards
Oklahoma	Receiving	Drake Stoops	10 receptions, 164 yards, 3 TD

=== At BYU ===
No. 14 Oklahoma Sooners (8–2) vs. BYU Cougars (5–5)

Quarter	1	2	3	4	Total
No. 14 Oklahoma	7	10	7	7	31
BYU	7	10	7	0	24

at LaVell Edwards Stadium• Provo, UT

- Date: Saturday, November 18, 2023
- Game time: 11:00 a.m. CST
- Game weather: •Cloudy Temperature: 47
- Game attendance: 63,714
- Referee: Derek Anderson
- TV announcers (ESPN): Mark Jones (play-by-play), Louis Riddick (analyst) & Quint Kessenich (sideline)

Game information

First Quarter

- (8:04) OKLA – Nic Anderson 3 yard pass from Dillon Gabriel, Zach Schmit kick (Drive: 7 plays, 85 yards, 3:17; OKLA 7–0)
- (3:05) BYU – Chase Roberts 23 yard pass from Jake Retzlaff, Will Ferrin kick (Drive: 10 plays, 75 yards, 4:59; Tied 7–7)

Second Quarter

- (13:06) OKLA – Jayden Gibson 27 yard pass from Dillon Gabriel, Zach Schmit kick (Drive: 7 plays, 52 yards, 2:16; OKLA 14–7)
- (7:49) BYU – Isaac Rex 1 yard pass from Jake Retzlaff, Will Ferrin kick (Drive: 10 plays, 75 yards, 5:17; Tied 14–14)
- (2:43) OKLA – Zach Schmit 23 yard FG (Drive: 12 plays, 71 yards, 5:06; OKLA 17–14)
- (0:00) BYU – Will Ferrin 49 yard FG (Drive: 11 plays, 33 yards, 2:43; Tied 17–17)

Third Quarter

- (5:55) OKLA – Billy Bowman Jr. Interception 100 yard return, Zach Schmit kick (Drive: 4 plays 58 yards, 1:55; OKLA 24–17)
- (1:19) BYU – Jake Retzlaff 10 yard rush, Will Ferrin kick (Drive: 8 plays, 75 yards, 4:36; Tied 24–24)

Fourth Quarter

- (7:57) OKLA – Gavin Sawchuk 16 yard rush, Zach Schmit kick (Drive: 3 plays, 25 yards, 0:46; OKLA 31–24)

Statistics	OKLA	BYU
First downs	20	18
Total yards	368	390
Rushes/yards	34/144	38/217
Passing yards	224	173
Passing: Comp–Att–Int	18–30	15–26–1
Time of possession	28:50	31:10

Team	Category	Player	Statistics
Oklahoma	Passing	Dillon Gabriel	13/21, 191 yards, 2 TD
Oklahoma	Rushing	Gavin Sawchuk	14 carries, 107 yards, 1 TD
Oklahoma	Receiving	Jalil Farooq	5 receptions, 53 yards
BYU	Passing	Jake Retzlaff	15/26, 173 yards, 2 TD, 1 INT
BYU	Rushing	Aidan Robbins	22 carries, 182 yards
BYU	Receiving	Kody Epps	6 receptions, 90 yards

=== TCU ===
TCU Horned Frogs (5–6) vs. No. 13 Oklahoma Sooners (9–2)

Quarter	1	2	3	4	Total
TCU	13	3	22	7	45
No. 13 Oklahoma	14	28	10	17	69

at Gaylord Family Oklahoma Memorial Stadium • Norman, OK

- Date: Friday, November 25, 2023
- Game time: 11:00 a.m. CST
- Game weather: • Sunny Temperature: 46
- Game attendance: 83,669
- Referee: David Alvarez
- TV announcers (FOX): Tim Brando (play-by-play), Spencer Tillman (analyst) & Josh Sims (sideline)

Game information

First quarter

- (11:33) OKLA – Dillon Gabriel 8 yard rush, Zach Schmit kick (Drive: 2 plays, 73 yards, 0:38; OKLA 7–0)
- (8:53) TCU – Josh Hoover 3 yard rush (Drive: 4 plays, 19 yards, 1:11; OKLA 7–6)
- (7:42) OKLA – Jayden Gibson 59 yard pass from Dillon Gabriel, Zach Schmit kick (Drive: 4 plays, 75 yards, 1:11; OKLA 14–6)
- (4:30) TCU – JoJo Earle 6 yard pass from Josh Hoover, Griffin Kell kick (Drive: 8 plays, 75 yards, 3:12: OKLA 14–13)

Second quarter

- (14:33) OKLA – Brenen Thompson 53 yard pass from Dillon Gabriel, Zach Schmit kick (Drive: 7 plays, 80 yards, 1:55; OKLA 21–13)
- (10:13) OKLA – Gavin Sawchuk 12 yard rush, Zach Schmit kick (Drive: 10 plays, 72 yards, 2:51; OKLA 28–13)
- (6:15) OKLA – Gavin Sawchuk 7 yard rush, Zach Schmit kick (Drive: 7 plays, 33 yards, 2:09; OKLA 35–13)
- (3:18) OKLA – Tawee Walker 9 yard rush, Zach Schmit kick (Drive: 6 plays, 78 yards, 2:11; OKLA 42–13)
- (0:00) TCU – Griffin Kell 23 yard field goal (Drive: 15 plays, 80 yards, 3:17; OKLA 42–16)

Third quarter

- (9:51) OKLA – Zach Schmit 23 yard field goal (Drive: 13 plays, 70 yards, 5:09; OKLA 45–16)
- (7:51) TCU – Emani Bailey 32 yard rush, Griffin Kell kick (Drive: 6 plays, 78 yards, 1:54; OKLA 45–23)
- (5:14) TCU – Jared Wiley 3 yard pass from Josh Hoover, 2 point conversion from Jared Wiley (Drive: 9 plays, 74 yards, 2:29; OKLA 45–31)
- (2:46) OKLA – Drake Stoops 9 yard pass from Dillon Gabriel, Zach Schmit kick (Drive: 6 plays, 75 yards, 2:28; OKLA 52–31)
- (0:39) TCU – Emani Bailey 12 yard pass from Josh Hoover, Griffin Kell kick (Drive: 6 pays, 76 yards, 1:57; OKLA 52–38)

Fourth quarter

- (10:14) OKLA – Zach Schmit 40 yard field goal (Drive: 12 plays, 53 yards, 5:25; OKLA 55–38)
- (6:30) OKLA – Gavin Sawchuk 9 yard rush, Zach Schmit kick (Drive: 5 plays, 30 yards, 2:02; OKLA 62–38)
- (6:12) OKLA – Billy Bowman 45 yard interception, Zach Schmit kick (Drive: 1 play, 45 yards, 0:18; OKLA 69–38)
- (2:22) OKLA – Jared Willey 5 yard pass from Josh Hoover, Griffin Kell kick (Drive: 6 plays, 56 yards, 3:40; OKLA 69–45)

Statistics	TCU	OKLA
First downs	25	30
Total yards	520	607
Rushes/yards	29/176	41/207
Passing yards	344	400
Passing: Comp–Att–Int	32–58–1	24–38–1
Time of possession	30:22	29:38

Team	Category	Player	Statistics
TCU	Passing	Josh Hoover	32/58, 344 yards, 4 TD, 1 INT
TCU	Rushing	Emani Bailey	21 carries, 150 yards, 1 TD
TCU	Receiving	Jared Wiley	8 receptions, 39 yards, 2 TD
Oklahoma	Passing	Dillon Gabriel	24/38, 400 yards, 3 TD, 1 INT
Oklahoma	Rushing	Gavin Sawchuk	22 carries, 130 yards, 3 TD
Oklahoma	Receiving	Drake Stoops	12 receptions, 125 yards, 1 TD

=== No. 14 Arizona (2023 Alamo Bowl) ===
No. 14 Arizona Wildcats (9–3) vs. No. 12 Oklahoma Sooners (10–2) (Alamo Bowl) – Game summary

Quarter	1	2	3	4	Total
No. 14 Arizona	10	3	8	17	38
No. 12 Oklahoma	0	14	10	0	24

at Alamodome • San Antonio, TX

- Date: Thursday, December 28, 2023
- Game time: 8:15 p.m. CST
- Game weather: Indoor
- Game attendance: 55,853
- Referee: David Smith
- TV announcers (ESPN): Tom Hart (play-by-play), Jordan Rodgers (analyst) & Cole Cubelic (sideline)

Game information

First quarter

- (10:57) ARZ – Tyler Loop 39 yard field goal (Drive: 8 plays, 57 yards, 3:56; ARZ 3–0)
- (10:33) ARZ – Jacob Cowing 35 yard pass from Noah Fifita, Tyler Loop kick (Drive: 1 play, 35 yards, 0:08; ARZ 10–0)

Second quarter

- (13:05) ARZ – Tyler Loop 38 yard field goal (Drive: 12 plays, 45 yards, 4:24; ARZ 13–0)
- (9:42) OKLA – Gavin Sawchuk 18 yard rush, Zach Schmit kick (Drive: 10 plays, 75 yards, 3:23; ARZ 13–7)
- (2:53) OKLA – Nic Anderson 10 yard pass from Jackson Arnold, Zach Schmit kick (Drive: 6 plays, 92 yards, 2:39; OKLA 14–13)

Third quarter

- (14:29) OKLA – Brenen Thompson 63 yard pass from Jackson Arnold, Zach Schmit kick (Drive: 2 plays, 75 yards, 0:31; OKLA 21–13)
- (6:59) OKLA – Zach Schmit 22 yard field goal (Drive: 12 plays, 84 yards, 4:12; OKLA 24–13)
- (0:02) ARZ – Gunner Maldonado 87 yard fumble recovery, Montana Lemonious-Craig 2 point conversion from Noah Fifita (Drive: 7 plays, 51 yards, 2:38; OKLA 24–21)

Fourth quarter

- (12:49) ARZ – Tyler Loop 37 yard field goal (Drive: 4 plays, -9 yards, 2:02; Tied 24–24)
- (5:28) ARZ – Jacob Cowing 57 yard pass from Noah Fifita, Tyler Loop kick (Drive: 8 plays, 95 yards, 4:27; ARZ 31–24)
- (2:56) ARZ – DJ Williams 19 yard rush, Tyler Loop kick (Drive: 2 plays, 19 yards, 0:47; ARZ 38–24)

Statistics	ARIZ	OKLA
First downs	16	23
Total yards	383	562
Rushes/yards	26/29	34/201
Passing yards	354	361
Passing: Comp–Att–Int	24–38–1	26–45–3
Time of possession	31:25	28:35

Team	Category	Player	Statistics
Arizona	Passing	Noah Fifita	24/38, 354 yards, 2 TD, 1 INT
Arizona	Rushing	DJ Williams	6 carries, 27 yards, 1 TD
Arizona	Receiving	Tetairoa McMillan	10 receptions, 160 yards
Oklahoma	Passing	Jackson Arnold	26/45, 361 yards, 2 TD, 3 INT
Oklahoma	Rushing	Gavin Sawchuk	15 carries, 134 yards, 1 TD
Oklahoma	Receiving	Nic Anderson	7 receptions, 73 yards, 1 TD

== Rankings ==
Ranking movements Legend: ██ Increase in ranking ██ Decrease in ranking ( ) = First-place votes
	Week															
Poll	Pre	1	2	3	4	5	6	7	8	9	10	11	12	13	14	Final
AP	20	18	19	16	14	12	5	6	6	10	17	14	13	12	12	15
Coaches	19	17	16	14	14	12	7	7 (1)	6	11	16	13	13	12	12	15
CFP	Not released									9	17	14	13	12	12	Not released

== After the season ==
=== NFL draft ===
The following Sooners were selected in the 2024 NFL draft.

Round	Pick	Player	Position	NFL club
1	29	Tyler Guyton	Tackle	Dallas Cowboys
6	177	Walter Rouse	Tackle	Minnesota Vikings
7	234	Jonah Laulu	Defensive tackle	Indianapolis Colts
