= 2023 Cincinnati Bearcats football team =

American college football season

2023 Cincinnati Bearcats football
- Conference: Big 12 Conference
- Record: 3–9 (1–8 Big 12)
- Head coach: Scott Satterfield (1st season)
- Offensive coordinator: Brad Glenn (1st season)
- Offensive scheme: Spread option
- Defensive coordinator: Bryan Brown (1st season)
- Co-defensive coordinator: Nate Fuqua (1st season)
- Base defense: 4–2–5
- Home stadium: Nippert Stadium

Uniform
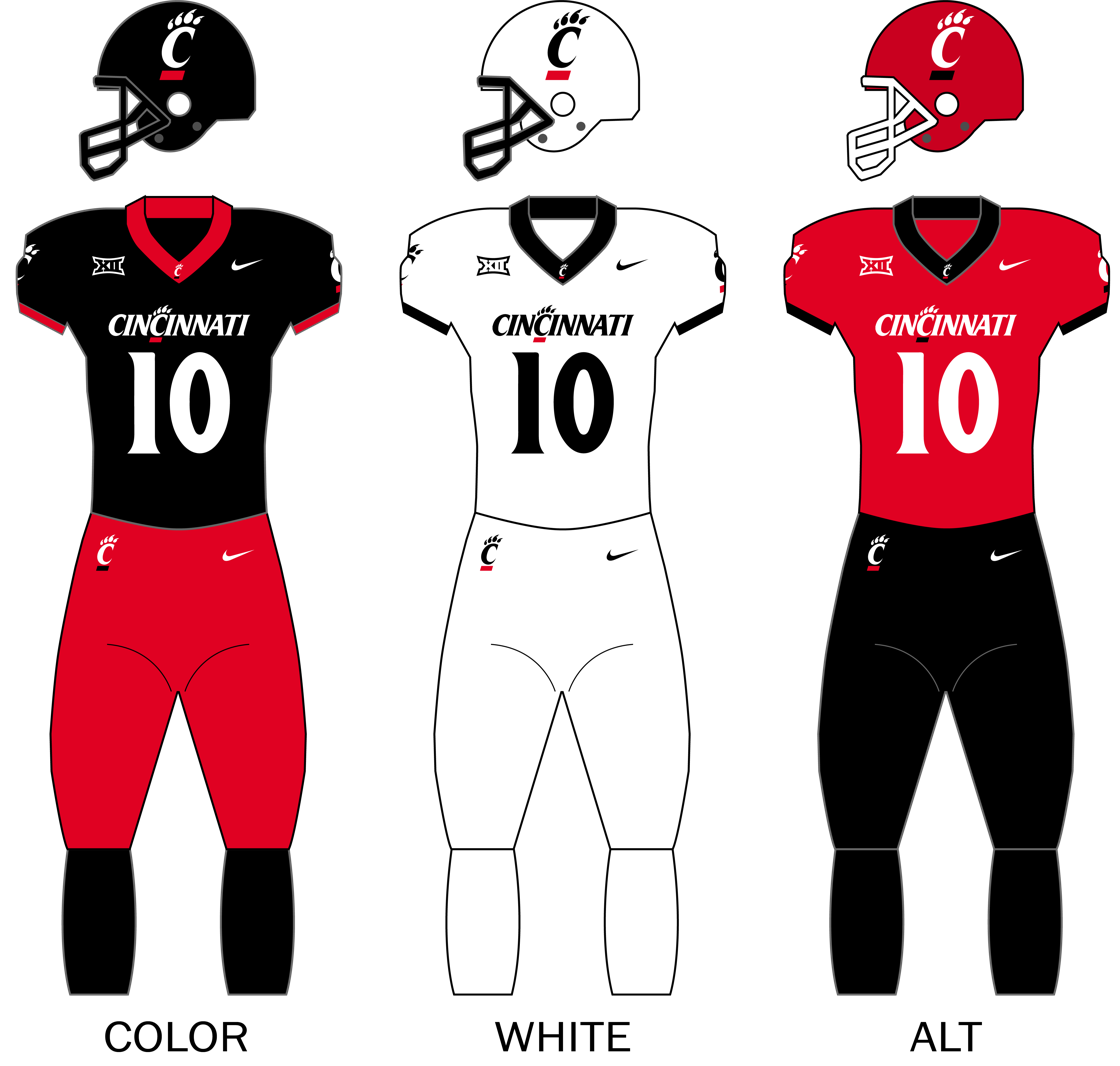

2023 Big 12 Conference football standings
	Conf.			Overall
Team	W		L	W		L
No. 3 Texas y$^	8	–	1	12	–	2
No. 16 Oklahoma State y	7	–	2	10	–	4
No. 15 Oklahoma	7	–	2	10	–	3
Iowa State	6	–	3	7	–	6
No. 18 Kansas State	6	–	3	9	–	4
West Virginia	6	–	3	9	–	4
Texas Tech	5	–	4	7	–	6
No. 23 Kansas	5	–	4	9	–	4
UCF	3	–	6	6	–	7
TCU	3	–	6	5	–	7
Houston	2	–	7	4	–	8
BYU	2	–	7	5	–	7
Baylor	2	–	7	3	–	9
Cincinnati	1	–	8	3	–	9
Championship: Texas 49, Oklahoma State 21
^ – College Football Playoff participant; $ – Conference champion; y – Championship game participant; Rankings from AP Poll

The 2023 Cincinnati Bearcats football team represented the University of Cincinnati during the 2023 NCAA Division I FBS football season. The Bearcats, members of the Big 12 Conference, played home games at Nippert Stadium in Cincinnati, Ohio. 2023 was the program's first season under head coach Scott Satterfield.

In September 2021, Cincinnati, BYU, Houston, and UCF accepted bids to join the Big 12. On June 10, the American Athletic Conference and the three American Athletic Conference schools set to depart from the league (Cincinnati, Houston, and UCF) announced that they had reached a buyout agreement with the conference that will allow those schools to join the Big 12 Conference in 2023. BYU had previously operated as an independent prior to accepting a membership invitation to join the Big 12 conference.

Two years removed from their appearance in the College Football Playoff, the Bearcats failed to qualify for a bowl game for the first time since 2017 after a loss to UCF.

== Offseason ==
=== Entered NFL draft ===
Player	Position
Tyler Scott	WR

=== Coaching changes ===
On November 27, 2022, head coach Luke Fickell, who had been the Bearcats head coach the last six years, left the school to take the same role at Wisconsin.

On December 5, 2022, Scott Satterfield, who had been the Louisville Cardinals head coach the last four years, left the school to become the Cincinnati head coach.

On December 6, 2022, it was reported that Bryan Brown would follow Satterfield to Cincinnati as defensive coordinator.

On December 14, 2022, Satterfield announced additions to the coaching and support staffs. Joining the Bearcats are Nic Cardwell, Derek Nicholson, De'Rail Sims and Pete Thomas. Official titles and responsibilities will be announced at a later date.

On January 4, 2023, Satterfield announced further staff additions, which included Greg Gasparato and Josh Stepp as well as his strength and conditioning staff led by Niko Palazeti.

On January 9, 2023, Satterfield announced the hiring of Tom Manning as offensive coordinator and tight ends coach. Other staff announced were Zach Grant as general manager, Jack Griffith as director of player personnel, Cass Simmons as director of recruiting strategy, and Carolina Tart as director of recruiting.

On February 20, 2023, Manning was reported to be leaving the Bearcats to become the next tight ends coach for the Indianapolis Colts.

After departures of Manning, Nicholson, and Gasparato in February, Satterfield announced the hiring of Brad Glenn as offensive coordinator/wide receivers coach, Nate Fuqua as co-defensive coordinator and outside linebackers coach, and Cortney Braswell as inside linebackers coach. Josh Stepp, previously named wide receivers coach, was named the tight end coach.

=== Offseason departures ===
2022 Cincinnati offseason departures
Name	Number	Pos.	Height	Weight	Year	Hometown	Notes
Ivan Pace Jr.	0	LB	6' 0"	235	Senior	Cincinnati, OH	Declared for NFL draft
Tre Tucker	1	WR	5' 9"	185	Senior	Akron, OH	Declared for NFL Draft
Wil Huber	2	LB	6' 4"	250	Graduate Student	Indianapolis, IN	Declared for NFL Draft
Ja'Von Hicks	3	S	6' 2"	210	Graduate Student	Cincinnati, OH	Declared for NFL Draft
Arquon Bush	9	CB	6' 0"	198	Senior	Cleveland, OH	Declared for NFL Draft
Charles McClelland	10	RB	5' 11"	200	(redshirt) Senior	Homerville, GA	Declared for NFL Draft
Leonard Taylor	11	TE	6' 5"	235	Senior	Springfield, OH	Declared for NFL Draft
Ty Van Fossen	13	LB	6' 2"	222	(redshirt) Senior	Croton, OH	Declared for NFL Draft
Tyler Scott	21	WR	5' 11"	185	Junior	Norton, OH	Declared for NFL Draft
Jacob Dingle	29	S	5' 11"	195	Senior	Louisville, KY	Retired
Lorenz Metz	51	OL	6' 9"	330	(redshirt) Senior	Neuötting, Germany	Declared for NFL Draft
James Tunstall	72	OT	6' 5"	320	(redshirt) Senior	Indian Head, MD	Declared for NFL Draft
Jeremy Cooper	74	OL	6' 4"	325	(redshirt) Senior	Chicago, IL	Declared for NFL Draft
Josh Whyle	81	TE	6' 6"	250	(redshirt) Senior	Cincinnati, OH	Declared for NFL Draft
Jabari Taylor	90	DL	6' 1"	280	Graduate Student	Akron, OH	Declared for NFL Draft

==== Transfers ====
===== Outgoing =====
Name	Pos.	Height	Weight	Year	Hometown	New School
Jake Renfro	C	6' 3"	308	Junior	Mokena, IL	Wisconsin
Ja'Quan Sheppard	CB	6' 2"	200	Senior	Zephyrhills, FL	Maryland
JQ Hardaway	CB	6' 3"	200	Freshman	Columbus, GA	Kentucky
Ryan Coe	K	6' 3"	227	Junior	McDonald, PA	North Carolina
Noah Potter	DE	6' 6"	270	(redshirt) Junior	Mentor, OH	NC State
Jojo Bermudez	WR	5' 10"	170	Freshman	Egg Harbor City, NJ	Delaware
Jadon Thompson	WR	6' 2"	187	Junior	Chicago, IL	Louisville
Nick Mardner	WR	6' 6"	215	Senior	Mississauga, ON	Auburn
Leroy Bowers	LB	6' 1"	207	(redshirt) Freshman	Cincinnati, OH	Southern
Luther Richesson	QB	6' 3"	204	Freshman	Nashville, TN	Golden West College
Mario Eugenio	DE	6' 3"	245	Freshman	Tampa, FL	
Patrick Body Jr.	CB	6' 2"	171	Freshman	Monroeville, PA	
Will Pauling	WR	5' 10"	180	(redshirt) Freshman	Chicago, IL	Wisconsin
L'Christian Smith	WR	6' 5"	215	(redshirt) Senior	Huber Heights, OH	Western Kentucky
Joe Huber	OL	6' 5"	310	(redshirt) Sophomore	Dublin, OH	Wisconsin
Drew Donley	WR	6' 2"	180	(redshirt) Sophomore	Frisco, TX	Texas State
Quincy Burroughs	WR	6' 2"	202	Freshman	Jacksonville, FL	Wisconsin
Devin Hightower	LB	5' 11"	225	(redshirt) Junior	Twinsburg, OH	
Jaheim Thomas	LB	6' 4"	240	(redshirt) Senior	Cincinnati, OH	Arkansas
Christian Lowery	K	5' 11"	180	Junior	Acworth, GA	
Marcus Peterson	WR	6' 3"	215	(redshirt) Freshman	Lake City, FL	McNeese
Malik Rainey	CB	5' 11"	175	(redshirt) Sophomore	Chicago, IL	
Armorion Smith	S	6' 2"	205	(redshirt) Sophomore	Detroit, MI	Michigan State
Cameron Junior	LB	6' 1"	211	(redshirt) Sophomore	Middletown, OH	Eastern Kentucky
Ben Bryant	QB	6' 3"	190	(redshirt) Senior	La Grange, IL	Northwestern
Jonah Lytle	CB	5' 11"	165	(redshirt) Sophomore	Canton, OH	Central State

===== Incoming =====
Name	Pos.	Height	Weight	Year	Hometown	Prev. School
Luke Kandra	OL	6' 4"	320	(redshirt) Junior	Cincinnati, OH	Louisville
Trevor Radosevich	C	6' 4"	310	(redshirt) Senior	Englishtown, NJ	Penn
Dorian Jones	LB	6' 0"	230	Senior	Plantation, FL	Louisville
Emory Jones	QB	6' 3"	212	(redshirt) Senior	LaGrange, GA	Arizona State
Keyshawn Helton	WR	5' 9"	160	Senior	Pensacola, FL	Florida State
Daniel Grzesiak	DE/LB	6' 1"	250	(redshirt) Senior	Los Angeles, CA	Utah State
Philip Wilder	OL	6' 5"	305	(redshirt) Junior	Jonesboro, GA	Southeast Missouri State
D.J. Taylor	DB	5' 10"	192	(redshirt) Junior	Tampa, FL	Arizona State
Dee Wiggins	WR	6' 3"	195	(redshirt) Senior	Miami, FL	Louisville
Carter Brown	K	6' 0"	205	Sophomore	Pearland, TX	Arizona State
Sterling Berkhalter	WR	6' 4"	200	Junior	Cincinnati, OH	North Carolina A&T
Joey Beljan	TE	6' 3"	240	(redshirt) Senior	Holland, NJ	Western Kentucky
Rory Bell	K	5' 9"	185	Sophomore	Wilmington, OH	Temple
Jordan Young	DB	6' 0"	195	(redshirt) Sophomore	Tampa, FL	Florida
Donovan Ollie	WR	6' 3"	212	(redshirt) Senior	Wylie, TX	Washington State
Aaron Turner	WR	5' 7"	185	Junior	Ellicott City, MD	UConn
Braden Smith	WR	5' 10"	185	(redshirt) Senior	Flowood, MS	Louisville
Deondre Buford	OL	6' 3"	315	(redshirt) Junior	Detroit, MI	Kentucky
George Udo	DB	6' 1"	200	Senior	Walnut Creek, CA	BYU
Xzavier Henderson	WR	6' 3"	200	Senior	Miami, FL	Florida
Jalen Hunt	DL	6' 4"	315	(redshirt) Senior	Belleville, MI	Michigan State
Kyree Moyston	DL	6' 4"	242	Sophomore	Norfolk, VA	Virginia Tech
Dion Hunter	LB	6' 2"	235	(redshirt) Junior	Rio Rancho, NM	New Mexico

=== Recruiting ===
College recruiting (2023)
Name	Hometown	School	Height	Weight	Commit date
Trevor Carter; LB	Ironton, Ohio	Ironton High School	6 ft 1 in (1.85 m)	205 lb (93 kg)	Nov 9, 2021
Trevor Carter; LB	Recruit ratings: Rivals: 247Sports: ESPN:				
Barry Jackson Jr. WR	Ellenwood, Georgia	Cedar Grove High School	5 ft 11 in (1.80 m)	175 lb (79 kg)	Dec 21, 2022
Barry Jackson Jr. WR	Recruit ratings: Rivals: 247Sports: ESPN:				
Brady Drogosh; QB	Warren, Michigan	De La Salle Collegiate High School	6 ft 4 in (1.93 m)	200 lb (91 kg)	May 2, 2021
Brady Drogosh; QB	Recruit ratings: Rivals: 247Sports: ESPN:				
Ty Perkins; WR	Ironton, Ohio	Ironton High School	6 ft 3 in (1.91 m)	190 lb (86 kg)	Jun 7, 2022
Ty Perkins; WR	Recruit ratings: Rivals: 247Sports: ESPN:				
Jayden Davis; S	Suwanee, Georgia	Collins Hill High School	6 ft 2 in (1.88 m)	175 lb (79 kg)	Dec 11, 2022
Jayden Davis; S	Recruit ratings: Rivals: 247Sports: ESPN:				
Rayquan Adkins; CB	Miami, Florida	Northwestern High School	5 ft 10 in (1.78 m)	155 lb (70 kg)	Dec 21, 2022
Rayquan Adkins; CB	Recruit ratings: Rivals: 247Sports: ESPN:				
Brian Simms III; DE	Baltimore, Maryland	St. Frances Academy	6 ft 3 in (1.91 m)	240 lb (110 kg)	Oct 13, 2022
Brian Simms III; DE	Recruit ratings: Rivals: 247Sports: ESPN:				
Evan Tengesdahl; OL	Huber Heights, Ohio	Wayne High School	6 ft 4 in (1.93 m)	285 lb (129 kg)	Dec 9, 2021
Evan Tengesdahl; OL	Recruit ratings: Rivals: 247Sports: ESPN:				
Manny Covey; RB	Starke, Florida	Bradford High School	5 ft 11 in (1.80 m)	175 lb (79 kg)	Jun 4, 2022
Manny Covey; RB	Recruit ratings: Rivals: 247Sports: ESPN:				
Josh Gregory; OT	St. Louis, Missouri	Christian Brothers College	6 ft 7 in (2.01 m)	270 lb (120 kg)	Jun 4, 2022
Josh Gregory; OT	Recruit ratings: Rivals: 247Sports: ESPN:				
Kamari Burns; DE	Gahanna, Ohio	Gahanna Lincoln High School	6 ft 4 in (1.93 m)	245 lb (111 kg)	Jun 8, 2022
Kamari Burns; DE	Recruit ratings: Rivals: 247Sports: ESPN:				
Overall recruit ranking: Rivals: 71 247Sports: 75 ESPN: 72
Note: In many cases, Scout, Rivals, 247Sports, On3, and ESPN may conflict in their listings of height and weight.; In these cases, the average was taken. ESPN grades are on a 100-point scale.; Sources: "2023 Cincinnati Football Commitment List". Rivals.; "2023 Players Commitments – Cincinnati". ESPN.; "2023 Team Ranking". Rivals.com.; "2023 Cincinnati Bearcats football team". 247Sports.

== Schedule ==
Date	Time	Opponent	Site	TV	Result	Attendance
September 2	3:30 p.m.	No. 24 (FCS) Eastern Kentucky*	Nippert Stadium; Cincinnati, OH	ESPN+	W 66–13	38,193
September 9	6:30 p.m.	at Pittsburgh*	Acrisure Stadium; Pittsburgh, PA	The CW	W 27–21	49,398
September 16	7:00 p.m.	Miami (OH)*	Nippert Stadium; Cincinnati, OH (Victory Bell)	ESPN+	L 24–31 ^{OT}	38,193
September 23	12:00 p.m.	No. 16 Oklahoma	Nippert Stadium; Cincinnati, OH (Big Noon Kickoff)	FOX	L 6–20	38,193
September 29	10:15 p.m.	at BYU	LaVell Edwards Stadium; Provo, UT	ESPN	L 27–35	63,834
October 14	12:00 p.m.	Iowa State^{†}	Nippert Stadium; Cincinnati, OH	FS1	L 10–30	38,193
October 21	12:00 p.m.	Baylor	Nippert Stadium; Cincinnati, OH	ESPN+	L 29–32	38,193
October 28	8:00 p.m.	at Oklahoma State	Boone Pickens Stadium; Stillwater, OK	ESPN2	L 13–45	53,855
November 4	3:30 p.m.	UCF	Nippert Stadium; Cincinnati, OH (rivalry)	FS1	L 26–28	38,193
November 11	7:00 p.m.	at Houston	TDECU Stadium; Houston, TX	FS1	W 24–14	34,312
November 18	2:30 p.m.	at West Virginia	Milan Puskar Stadium; Morgantown, WV (rivalry)	ESPN+	L 21–42	43,588
November 25	7:30 p.m.	Kansas	Nippert Stadium; Cincinnati, OH	ESPN2	L 16–49	38,193
*Non-conference game; ^{†}Homecoming; Rankings from AP Poll (and CFP Rankings, after November 2) - Released prior to game; All times are in Eastern time

== Game summaries ==
=== No. 24 (FCS) Eastern Kentucky ===
Game One – No. 24 (FCS) Eastern Kentucky Colonels (0-0) at Cincinnati Bearcats (0-0)

Quarter	1	2	3	4	Total
No. 24 (FCS) Colonels	0	7	3	3	13
Bearcats	21	21	10	14	66

at Nippert Stadium • Cincinnati, Ohio

- Date: Saturday, September 2, 2023
- Game time: 3:30 p.m. EDT
- Game weather: Sunny • Temperature: 89 °F (32 °C) • Wind: 7 mph
- Game attendance: 38,193
- Referee: Christian Watson
- TV announcers (ESPN+): Noah Reed (play-by-play), Ryan Leaf (analyst), and Shane Sparks (sideline)
- ESPN

Game information

First quarter

- 11:45 CIN - Xzavier Henderson 49-yard pass from Emory Jones (Carter Brown kick) - 7-0 Cincinnati, Drive: 7 plays, 71 yards, 3:09
- 6:52 CIN - Dee Wiggins 39-yard pass from Emory Jones (Carter Brown kick) - 14-0 Cincinnati, Drive: 5 plays, 87 yards, 2:07
- 1:41 CIN - Emory Jones 1-yard run (Carter Brown kick) - 21-0 Cincinnati, Drive: 9 plays, 80 yards, 3:46

Second quarter

- 11:47 CIN - Payten Singletary 1-yard pass from Emory Jones (Carter Brown kick) - 28-0 Cincinnati, Drive: 4 plays, 77 yards, 1:23
- 7:17 CIN - Emory Jones 12-yard run (Carter Brown kick) - 35-0 Cincinnati, Drive: 8 plays, 65 yards, 3:04
- 5:08 EKU - Hunter Brown 17-yard pass from Parker McKinney (Patrick Nations kick) - 35-7 Cincinnati, Drive: 4 plays, 74 yards, 2:03
- 0:49 CIN - Braden Smith 48-yard pass from Emory Jones (Carter Brown kick) - 42-7 Cincinnati, Drive: 10 plays, 84 yards, 4:14

Third quarter

- 13:21 CIN - Carter Brown 46-yard field goal - 45-7 Cincinnati, Drive: 4 plays, -9 yards, 1:27
- 8:12 EKU - Patrick Nations 42-yard field goal - 45-10 Cincinnati, Drive: 4 plays, -7 yards, 1:44
- 2:42 CIN - Aaron Turner 6-yard pass from Emory Jones (Carter Brown kick) - 52-10 Cincinnati, Drive: 11 plays, 75 yards, 5:30

Fourth quarter

- 13:39 CIN - Brady Lichtenberg 4-yard run (Carter Brown kick) - 59-10 Cincinnati, Drive: 6 plays, 37 yards, 2:39
- 6:30 EKU - Patrick Nations 43-yard field goal - 59-13 Cincinnati, Drive: 13 plays, 49 yards, 7:09
- 4:37 CIN - Barry Jackson Jr. 65-yard pass from Brady Lichtenberg - 66-13 Cincinnati, Drive: 4 plays, 75 yards, 1:53

Statistics	EKU	CIN
First downs	15	30
Plays–yards	55–302	71–667
Rushes–yards	32–125	44–229
Passing yards	177	438
Passing: comp–att–int	13–25–2	23–27–0
Turnovers		
Time of possession	28:14	31:46

Team	Category	Player	Statistics
Eastern Kentucky	Passing	Patrick McKinney	13/24, 177 yards, 1 TD, 2 INT
Eastern Kentucky	Rushing	Joshua Carter	7 carries, 68 yards
Eastern Kentucky	Receiving	Jaden Smith	5 receptions, 81 yards
Cincinnati	Passing	Emory Jones	19/23, 345 yards, 5 TD
Cincinnati	Rushing	Corey Kiner	13 carries, 105 yards
Cincinnati	Receiving	Xzavier Henderson	7 receptions, 149 yards, 1 TD

=== at Pittsburgh ===
Game Two – Cincinnati Bearcats (1-0) at Pittsburgh Panthers (1-0)

Quarter	1	2	3	4	Total
Bearcats	10	10	7	0	27
Panthers	7	0	0	14	21

at Acrisure Stadium • Pittsburgh, Pennsylvania

- Date: Saturday, September 9, 2023
- Game time: 6:30 p.m. EDT
- Game weather: • Temperature: • Wind:
- Game attendance: 49,398
- Referee: David Alvarez
- TV announcers (The CW): Tom Werme (play-by-play), James Bates (analyst), and Treavor Scales (sideline)
- ESPN

Game information

First quarter

- 13:06 CIN - Payten Singletary 12-yard pass from Emory Jones (Carter Brown kick) - 7-0 Cincinnati, Drive: 4 plays, 64 yards, 1:24
- 8:57 CIN - Carter Brown 22-yard field goal - 10-0 Cincinnati, Drive: 5 plays, 74 yards, 2:20
- 4:17 PITT - Konata Mumpfield 5-yard pass from Phil Jurkovec (Ben Sauls kick) - 10-7 Cincinnati, Drive: 10 plays, 75 yards, 4:40

Second quarter

- 13:20 CIN - Corey Kiner 7-yard run (Carter Brown kick) - 17-7 Cincinnati, Drive: 7 plays, 76 yards, 3:07
- 0:05 CIN - Carter Brown 47-yard field goal - 20-7 Cincinnati, Drive: 17 plays, 69 yards, 8:11

Third quarter

- 9:17 CIN - Braden Smith 21-yard pass from Emory Jones (Carter Brown kick) - 27-7 Cincinnati, Drive: 4 plays, 36 yards, 1:44

Fourth quarter

- 14:48 PITT - Konata Mumpfield 9-yard pass from Phil Jurkovec (Ben Sauls kick) - 27-14 Cincinnati, Drive: 7 plays, 48 yards, 2:06
- 11:53 PITT - Gavin Bartholomew 16-yard pass from Phil Jurkovec (Ben Sauls kick) - 27-21 Cincinnati, Drive: 4 plays, 86 yards, 0:45

Statistics	CIN	PITT
First downs	20	18
Plays–yards	69–371	61–262
Rushes–yards	42–216	29–83
Passing yards	155	179
Passing: comp–att–int	19–27–1	10–32–0
Turnovers		
Time of possession	34:43	25:17

Team	Category	Player	Statistics
Cincinnati	Passing	Emory Jones	18/26, 125 yards, 2 TD, 1 INT
Cincinnati	Rushing	Corey Kiner	20 carries, 153 yards, 1 TD
Cincinnati	Receiving	Braden Smith	5 receptions, 59 yards, 1 TD
Pittsburgh	Passing	Phil Jurkovec	10/32, 179 yards, 3 TD
Pittsburgh	Rushing	C'bo Flemister	6 carries, 38 yards
Pittsburgh	Receiving	Gavin Bartholomew	3 receptions, 80 yards, 1 TD

=== Miami (OH) ===
Game Three – Miami (Ohio) Redhawks (1-1) at Cincinnati Bearcats (2-0)

Quarter	1	2	3	4	OT	Total
RedHawks	7	7	7	3	7	31
Bearcats	10	3	3	8	0	24

at Nippert Stadium • Cincinnati, Ohio

- Date: Saturday, September 16, 2023
- Game time: 7:00 p.m. EDT
- Game weather: Sunny • Temperature: 80 °F (27 °C) • Wind: 5 mph
- Game attendance: 38,193
- Referee: Matt Packowski
- TV announcers (ESPN+): Sean Kenney (play-by-play) and Brad Hopkins (analyst)

Game information

First quarter

- 14:45 M-OH - Gage Larvadain 79-yard pass from Brett Gabbert (Graham Nicholson kick) - 7-0 Miami (OH), Drive: 1 play, 79 yards, 0:11
- 11:47 CIN - Corey Kiner 4-yard run (Carter Brown kick) - 7-7, Drive: 6 plays, 75 yards, 2:58
- 1:40 CIN - Carter Brown 28-yard field goal - 10-7 Cincinnati, Drive: 11 plays, 72 yards, 4:48

Second quarter

- 9:22 M-OH - Javon Tracy 17-yard pass from Brett Gabbert (Graham Nicholson kick) - 14-10 Miami (OH), Drive: 12 plays, 69 yards, 7:12
- 1:52 CIN - Carter Brown 23-yard field goal - 14-13 Miami (OH), Drive: 16 plays, 79 yards, 7:23

Third quarter

- 7:23 CIN - Carter Brown 23-yard field goal - 16-14 Cincinnati, Drive: 11 plays, 62 yards, 4:21
- 3:01 M-OH - Kevin Davis 1-yard run (Graham Nicholson kick) - 21-16 Miami (OH), Drive: 9 plays, 75 yards, 4:22

Fourth quarter

- 13:52 CIN - Emory Jones 17-yard run (Emory Jones two-point pass to Chamon Metayer) - 24-21 Cincinnati, Drive: 11 plays, 75 yards, 4:09
- 5:10 M-OH - Graham Nicholson 20-yard field goal - 24-24, Drive: 7 plays, 88 yards, 3:09

Overtime

- 1OT M-OH - Joe Wilkins Jr. 8-yard pass from Brett Gabbert (Graham Nicholson kick) - 31-24 Miami (OH), Drive: 2 plays, 25 yards

Statistics	MIA	CIN
First downs	16	30
Plays–yards	49-358	93-538
Rushes–yards	29-121	57-273
Passing yards	237	265
Passing: comp–att–int	12-20-1	18-34-2
Turnovers		
Time of possession	23:42	36:18

Team	Category	Player	Statistics
Miami (OH)	Passing	Brett Gabbert	12/20, 237 yards, 3 TD, 1 INT
Miami (OH)	Rushing	Brett Gabbert	9 carries, 75 yards
Miami (OH)	Receiving	Gage Larvadain	1 reception, 79 yards, 1 TD
Cincinnati	Passing	Emory Jones	18/34, 265 yards, 2 INT
Cincinnati	Rushing	Ryan Montgomery	20 carries, 104 yards
Cincinnati	Receiving	Xzavier Henderson	12 receptions, 140 yards

=== No. 16 Oklahoma ===
Game Four – No. 16 Oklahoma Sooners (3-0) at Cincinnati Bearcats (2-1)

Quarter	1	2	3	4	Total
No. 16 Sooners	7	3	7	3	20
Bearcats	3	0	3	0	6

at Nippert Stadium • Cincinnati, Ohio

- Date: Saturday, September 23, 2023
- Game time: 12:00 p.m. EDT
- Game weather: Sunny • Temperature: 70 °F (21 °C) • Wind: 8 mph
- Game attendance: 38,193
- Referee: Kevin Mar
- TV announcers (Fox): Gus Johnson (Play-by-Play), Joel Klatt (analyst), Jenny Taft (sideline)

Game information

First quarter

- 7:39 CIN - Carter Brown 40-yard field goal - 3-0 Cincinnati, Drive: 9 plays, 37 yards, 3:45
- 0:34 OKLA - Nic Anderson 5-yard pass from Dillon Gabriel (Zach Schmit kick) - 7-3 Oklahoma, Drive: 6 plays, 66 yards, 1:47

Second quarter

- 8:40 OKLA - Zach Schmit 34-yard field goal - 10-3 Oklahoma, Drive: 12 plays, 72 yards, 4:51

Third quarter

- 8:22 CIN - Carter Brown 54-yard field goal - 10-6 Oklahoma, Drive: 12 plays, 49 yards, 4:32
- 5:23 OKLA - Dillon Gabriel 1-yard run (Zach Schmit kick) - 17-6 Oklahoma, Drive: 9 plays, 75 yards, 2:59

Fourth quarter

- 10:59 OKLA - Zach Schmit 30-yard field goal - 20-6 Oklahoma, Drive: 9 plays, 67 yards, 4:33

Statistics	OKLA	CIN
First downs	21	21
Plays–yards	72-425	79-376
Rushes–yards	34-103	37-141
Passing yards	322	235
Passing: comp–att–int	26-38-0	22-42-2
Turnovers		
Time of possession	27:35	32:25

Team	Category	Player	Statistics
Oklahoma	Passing	Dillon Gabriel	26/38, 322 yards, 1 TD
Oklahoma	Rushing	Marcus Major	15 carries, 63 yards
Oklahoma	Receiving	Andrel Anthony	7 receptions, 117 yards
Cincinnati	Passing	Emory Jones	22/41, 235 yards, 2 INT
Cincinnati	Rushing	Emory Jones	15 carries, 42 yards
Cincinnati	Receiving	Chamon Metayer	3 receptions, 50 yards

=== at BYU ===
Game Five – Cincinnati Bearcats (2-2) at BYU Cougars (3-1)

Quarter	1	2	3	4	Total
Bearcats	0	10	10	7	27
Cougars	7	7	14	7	35

at LaVell Edwards Stadium • Provo, Utah

- Date: Friday, September 29, 2023
- Game time: 8:15 p.m. MDT
- Game weather: • Temperature: 72 °F (22 °C) • Wind: SE 6 mph
- Game attendance: 63,834
- Referee: Michael VanderValde
- TV announcers (ESPN): Clay Matvick (play-by-play), Aaron Murray (analyst), and Lauren Sisler (sideline)

Game information

First quarter

- 8:28 BYU - Jakob Robinson 42-yard interception return (Will Ferrin kick) - 7-0 BYU, Drive: 6 plays, 19 yards, 2:51

Second quarter

- 10:59 CIN - Chamon Metayer 27-yard pass from Emory Jones (Carter Brown kick) - 7-7, Drive: 17 plays, 90 yards, 6:49
- 0:44 CIN - Carter Brown 33-yard field goal - 10-7 Cincinnati, Drive: 9 plays, 42 yards, 2:49
- 0:06 BYU - Darius Lassiter 22-yard pass from Kedon Slovis (Will Ferrin kick) - 14-10 BYU, Drive: 3 plays, 82 yards, 0:30

Third quarter

- 11:38 BYU - LJ Martin 29-yard run (Will Ferrin kick) - 21-10 BYU, Drive: 5 plays, 73 yards, 2:02
- 5:24 CIN - Carter Brown 22-yard field goal - 21-13 BYU, Drive: 14 plays, 71 yards, 6:14
- 2:53 BYU - Chase Roberts 59-yard pass from Kedon Slovis (Will Ferrin kick) - 28-13 BYU, Drive: 4 plays, 75 yards, 2:31
- 0:59 CIN - Chamon Metayer 23-yard pass from Emory Jones (Carter Brown kick) - 28-20 BYU, Drive: 5 plays, 75 yards, 1:54

Fourth quarter

- 12:41 BYU - LJ Martin 1-yard run (Will Ferrin kick) - 35-20 BYU, Drive: 5 plays, 15 yards, 2:19
- 0:26 CIN - Braden Smith 31-yard pass from Emory Jones (Carter Brown kick) - 35-27 BYU, Drive: 8 plays, 80 yards, 1:10

Statistics	CIN	BYU
First downs	26	17
Plays–yards	84-498	53-295
Rushes–yards	47-242	28-70
Passing yards	256	225
Passing: comp–att–int	23-37-1	14-25-0
Turnovers		
Time of possession	35:01	24:59

Team	Category	Player	Statistics
Cincinnati	Passing	Emory Jones	23/37, 256 yards, 3 TD, 1 INT
Cincinnati	Rushing	Emory Jones	14 carries, 94 yards
Cincinnati	Receiving	Xzavier Henderson	7 receptions, 74 yards
BYU	Passing	Kedon Slovis	13/24, 223 yards, 2 TD
BYU	Rushing	LJ Martin	16 carries, 66 yards, 2 TD
BYU	Receiving	Chase Roberts	6 receptions, 131 yards, 1 TD

=== Iowa State ===
Game Six – Iowa State Cyclones at Cincinnati Bearcats

Quarter	1	2	3	4	Total
Cyclones	3	14	6	7	30
Bearcats	7	0	3	0	10

at Nippert Stadium • Cincinnati, Ohio

- Date: Saturday, October 14, 2023
- Game time: 12:00 p.m. EDT
- Game weather: Sunny • Temperature: 59 °F (15 °C) • Wind: W 10 MPH
- Game attendance: 38,193
- Referee: Kevin Boitmann
- TV announcers (FS1): Eric Collins, Devin Gardner

Game information

First Quarter

- (5:31) ISU - Contreraz, Chase 30 yd field goal (Drive: 6 plays, 23 yards, 2:12; ISU 3–0)
- (0:42) UC - Metayer, Chamon 20 yd pass from Jones, Emory (Brown, Carter kick) (Drive: 10 plays, 75 yards, 4:49; UC 7–3)

Second Quarter

- (7:48) ISU - Becht, Rocco 2 yd run (Contreraz, Chase kick) (Drive: 15 plays, 59 yards, 7:45; ISU 10–7)
- (3:43) ISU - Brahmer, Benjamin 14 yd pass from Becht, Rocco (Contreraz, Chase kick) (Drive: 5 plays, 81 yards, 1:39; ISU 17–7)

Third Quarter

- (10:45) ISU - Contreraz, Chase 34 yd field goal (Drive: 7 plays, 12 yards, 4:03; ISU 20–7)
- (4:03) UC - Brown, Carter 36 yd field goal (Drive: 14 plays, 56 yards, 6:42; ISU 20–10)
- (1:10) ISU - Contreraz, Chase 30 yd field goal (Drive: 6 plays, 45 yards, 2:53; ISU 23–10)

Fourth Quarter

- (10:00) ISU - Klotz, Stevo 13 yd pass from Becht, Rocco (Contreraz, Chase kick) (Drive: 7 plays, 69 yards, 4:05; ISU 30–10)

Statistics	ISU	CIN
First downs	17	15
Plays–yards	364	214
Rushes–yards	123	115
Passing yards	241	99
Passing: comp–att–int	15-25-0	15-29-2
Turnovers		
Time of possession	33:40	26:20

Team	Category	Player	Statistics
Iowa State	Passing	Rocco Becht	15/25, 241 yards, 2 TD
Iowa State	Rushing	Eli Sanders	16 carries, 52 yards
Iowa State	Receiving	Jayden Higgins	6 receptions, 172 yards
Cincinnati	Passing	Emory Jones	14/26, 96 yards, 1 TD, 2 INT
Cincinnati	Rushing	Emory Jones	15 carries, 72 yards
Cincinnati	Receiving	Chamon Metayer	4 receptions, 43 yards, 1 TD

=== Baylor ===
Game Seven – Baylor Bears at Cincinnati Bearcats

Quarter	1	2	3	4	Total
Bears	3	17	9	3	32
Bearcats	0	14	0	15	29

at Nippert Stadium • Cincinnati, Ohio

- Date: Saturday, October 21, 2023
- Game time: 12:00 p.m. EDT
- Game weather: Sunny • Temperature: 52 °F (11 °C) • Wind:
- Game attendance: 38,193
- Referee: Kevin Mar
- TV: ESPN+

Game information

First quarter

- (5:55) BAY – Isaiah Hankins 54-yard field goal (Drive: 4 plays, –3 yards, 2:02; Baylor 3–0)

Second quarter

- (14:55) CIN – Xzavier Henderson 4-yard reception from Emory Jones (Carter Brown kick) (Drive: 14 plays, 75 yards, 6:00; Cincinnati 7–3)
- (12:16) BAY – Blake Shapen 3-yard run (Isaiah Hankins kick) (Drive: 7 plays, 75 yards, 2:39; Baylor 10–7)
- (12:09) BAY – Byron Vaughns 15-yard fumble recovery (Isaiah Hankins kick) (Drive: Baylor 17–7)
- (7:18) BAY – Isaiah Hankins 43-yard field goal (Drive: 8 plays, 47 yards, 2:44; Baylor 20–7)
- (5:59) CIN – Myles Montgomery 38-yard run (Carter Brown kick) (Drive: 4 plays, 75 yards, 1:19; Baylor 20–14)

Third quarter

- (12:17) BAY – Jake Roberts 6-yard reception from Blake Shapen, 2-point pass incomplete (Drive: 6 plays, 75 yards, 2:43; Baylor 26–14)
- (5:00) BAY – Isaiah Hankins 46-yard field goal (Drive: 9 plays, 56 yards, 4:34; Baylor 29–14)

Fourth quarter

- (14:20) CIN – Myles Montgomery 1-yard run (Carter Brown kick) (Drive: 12 plays, 62 yards, 5:32; Baylor 29–21)
- (7:01) BAY – Isaiah Hankins 43-yard field goal (Drive: 15 plays, 57 yards, 7:14; Baylor 32–21)
- (5:03) CIN – Xzavier Henderson 29-yard reception from Emory Jones (Evan Prater 2-point pass) (Drive: 6 plays, 75 yards, 1:58; Baylor 32–29)

Statistics	BAY	CIN
First downs	22	21
Plays–yards	70–396	74–450
Rushes–yards	28–80	43–288
Passing yards	316	162
Passing: comp–att–int	25–42–0	19–31–0
Turnovers		
Time of possession	31:13	28:47

Team	Category	Player	Statistics
Baylor	Passing	Blake Shapen	25-42, 316 yards, 1 TD
Baylor	Rushing	Dominic Richardson	8 carries, 37 yards
Baylor	Receiving	Ketron Jackson, Jr.	5 receptions, 130 yards
Cincinnati	Passing	Emory Jones	19-30, 162 yards, 2 TD
Cincinnati	Rushing	Corey Kiner	15 carries, 129 yards
Cincinnati	Receiving	Xzavier Henderson	8 receptions, 82 yards, 2 TD

=== at Oklahoma State ===
Game Eight – Cincinnati Bearcats at Oklahoma State Cowboys

Quarter	1	2	3	4	Total
Bearcats	7	0	0	6	13
Cowboys	7	3	21	14	45

at Boone Pickens Stadium • Stillwater, Oklahoma

- Date: Saturday, October 28, 2023
- Game time: 8:00 p.m. EDT
- Game weather: Cloudy • Temperature: 42 °F (6 °C) • Wind: N 11 MPH
- Game attendance: 53,855
- Referee: Tutashinda Salaam
- TV: ESPN2

Game information

First quarter
Second quarter
Third quarter
Fourth quarter

Statistics	CIN	OSU
First downs	20	23
Plays–yards	75–442	71–601
Rushes–yards	50–277	37–315
Passing yards	165	286
Passing: comp–att–int	11–25–1	17–34–1
Turnovers		
Time of possession	30:33	29:27

Team	Category	Player	Statistics
Cincinnati	Passing	Emory Jones	6/16, 117 yards, INT
Cincinnati	Rushing	Myles Montgomery	8 carries, 90 yards, TD
Cincinnati	Receiving	Xzavier Henderson	4 receptions, 82 yards
Oklahoma State	Passing	Alan Bowman	17/34, 286 yards, 2 TD, INT
Oklahoma State	Rushing	Ollie Gordon II	25 carries, 271 yards, 2 TD
Oklahoma State	Receiving	Leon Johnson III	5 receptions, 149 yards

=== UCF ===
Game Nine – UCF Knights at Cincinnati Bearcats

Quarter	1	2	3	4	Total
Knights	7	7	7	7	28
Bearcats	3	7	7	9	26

at Nippert Stadium • Cincinnati, Ohio

- Date: Saturday, November 4, 2023
- Game time: 3:30 p.m. EDT
- Game weather: • Temperature: • Wind:
- Game attendance: 38,193
- TV announcers (FS1): Adam Alexander, Devin Gardner

Game information

First Quarter

- Cincinnati: Carter Brown 39-yard field goal, 9:58
- UCF: John Rhys Plumlee 8-yard touchdown run (Colton Boomer Kick), 0:20

Second Quarter

- UCF: R. J. Harvey 13-yard touchdown run (Colton Boomer Kick), 4:12
- Cincinnati: Braden Smith 11-yard touchdown pass from Emory Jones (Carter Brown Kick), 1:56

Third Quarter

- Cincinnati: Ryan Montgomery 2-yard touchdown run (Carter Brown Kick), 5:19
- UCF: R. J. Harvey 25-yard touchdown run (Colton Boomer Kick), 0:31

Fourth Quarter

- Cincinnati: Carter Brown 28-yard field goal, 6:21
- UCF: R. J. Harvey 1-yard touchdown run (Colton Boomer Kick), 2:41
- Cincinnati: Corey Kiner 6-yard touchdown run (pass failed), 1:27

Statistics	UCF	CIN
First downs	23	23
Plays–yards	393	515
Rushes–yards	228	248
Passing yards	165	267
Passing: comp–att–int	0	2
Turnovers		
Time of possession	27:03	32:57

Team	Category	Player	Statistics
UCF	Passing	John Rhys Plumlee	13/23, 165 yards
UCF	Rushing	RJ Harvey	20 carries, 164 yards, 3 TD
UCF	Receiving	Javon Baker	4 receptions, 93 yards
Cincinnati	Passing	Emory Jones	16/22, 217 yards, TD, INT
Cincinnati	Rushing	Corey Kiner	19 carries, 114 yards, TD
Cincinnati	Receiving	Braden Smith	6 receptions, 114 yards, TD

=== at Houston ===
Game Ten – Cincinnati Bearcats at Houston Cougars

Quarter	1	2	3	4	Total
Bearcats	7	7	3	7	24
Cougars	0	7	0	7	14

at TDECU Stadium • Houston, Texas

- Date: Saturday, November 11, 2023
- Game time: 7:00 p.m. EDT
- Game weather: Cloudy • Temperature: • Wind:
- Game attendance: 34,312
- Referee: David Alvarez
- TV: FS1

Game information

First quarter

- (8:43) CIN – Ryan Montgomery 7-yard pass from Emory Jones (Carter Brown kick) (Drive: 11 plays, 75 yards, 6:17; Cincinnati 7–0)

Second quarter

- (14:04) HOU – Joseph Manjack IV 7 yard-pass from Donovan Smith (Jack Martin kick) (Drive: 12 plays, 83 yards, 4:57; Tied 7–7)
- (8:04) CIN – Corey Kiner 1-yard run (Carter Brown kick) (Drive: 6 plays, 93 yards, 2:17; Cincinnati 14–7)

Third quarter

- (8:25) CIN – Carter Brown 31-yard field goal (Drive: 12 plays, 37 yards, 6:28; Cincinnati 17–7)

Fourth quarter

- (8:47) CIN – Corey Kiner 5-yard run (Carter Brown kick) (Drive: 6 plays, 52 yards, 3:14; Cincinnati 24–7)
- (3:22) HOU – Joseph Manjack IV 2-yard pass from Donovan Smith (Jack Martin kick) (Drive: 12 plays, 75 yards, 5:25; Cincinnati 24–14)

Statistics	CIN	HOU
First downs	22	12
Plays–yards	71–368	51–241
Rushes–yards	48–204	23–139
Passing yards	164	102
Passing: comp–att–int	17–23–0	16–28–0
Turnovers		
Time of possession	36:55	23:05

Team	Category	Player	Statistics
Cincinnati	Passing	Emory Jones	13/16, 131 yards, 1 TD
Cincinnati	Rushing	Corey Kiner	23 carries, 129 yards, 2 TD
Cincinnati	Receiving	Braden Smith	5 receptions, 69 yards
Houston	Passing	Donovan Smith	16/28, 102 yards, 2 TD, 3 INT
Houston	Rushing	Donovan Smith	13 carries, 88 yards
Houston	Receiving	Joseph Manjack IV	4 receptions, 22 yards, 2 TD

=== at West Virginia ===
Game Eleven – Cincinnati Bearcats at West Virginia Mountaineers

Quarter	1	2	3	4	Total
Bearcats	0	7	0	14	21
Mountaineers	7	21	14	0	42

at Milan Puskar Stadium • Morgantown, West Virginia

- Date: Saturday, November 18, 2023
- Game time: 2:30 p.m. EDT
- Game weather: Sunny • Temperature: 48 °F (9 °C) • Wind:
- Game attendance: 43,588
- Referee: Michael VanderVelde
- TV announcers (ESPN+): Jorge Sedano (play-by-play) & Orlando Franklin (analyst)
- ESPN box score

Game information

First quarter
Second quarter
Third quarter
Fourth quarter

Statistics	CIN	WVU
First downs	18	31
Plays–yards	332/58	634/65
Rushes–yards	141/31	424/46
Passing yards	191	210
Passing: comp–att–int	16-27-0	12-9-1
Turnovers		
Time of possession	25:11	34:49

Team	Category	Player	Statistics
Cincinnati	Passing	Emory Jones	14/24, 166 yards, 2 TD
Cincinnati	Rushing	Corey Kiner	13 carries, 56 yards
Cincinnati	Receiving	Xzavier Henderson	6 receptions, 104 yards
West Virginia	Passing	Garrett Greene	12/19, 210 yards, 1 TD, 1 INT
West Virginia	Rushing	Jahiem White	21 carries, 204 yards, 1 TD
West Virginia	Receiving	Jahiem White	1 reception, 75 yards, 1 TD

=== Kansas ===
Game Twelve – Kansas Jayhawks at Cincinnati Bearcats

Quarter	1	2	3	4	Total
Jayhawks	0	21	7	21	49
Bearcats	3	7	0	6	16

at Nippert Stadium • Cincinnati, Ohio

- Date: Saturday, November 25, 2023
- Game time: 7:30 p.m. EDT
- Game weather: Clear • Temperature: 39 °F (4 °C) • Wind:
- Game attendance: 38,193
- Referee: Kevin Boitman
- TV announcers (ESPN2): John Schriffen, Rocky Boiman

Game information

First quarter

- (8:12) UC Carter Brown 49 yard field goal 12–44, 6:48 UC 3–0

Second quarter

- (8:55) KU Devin Neal 13 yard run (Seth Keller kick good) 5–77, 2:38 KU 7–3
- (5:31) KU Jason Bean 15 yard pass to Jared Casey (Seth Keller kick good) 5–66, 2:22 KU 14–3
- (0:26) UC Emory Jones 11 yard pass Ryan Montgomery (Carter Brown kick good) 13–75, 5:05 KU 14–10
- (0:05) KU Jason Bean 26 yard pass to Mason Fairchild (Seth Keller kick good) 2–56, 0:17 KU 21–10

Third quarter

- (11:53) KU Devin Neal 30 yard run (Seth Keller kick good) 8–75, 3:07 KU 28–10

Fourth quarter

- (13:23) UC Ryan Montgomery 7 yard pass to Dee Wiggins (Emory Jones run no good) 12–67, 5:58 KU 28–16
- (11:39) KU Jason Bean 43 yard run (Seth Keller kick good) 3–79, 1:37 KU 35—16
- (9:52) KU Jason Bean 50 yard run (Seth Keller kick good) 2–59, 0:55 KU 42–16
- (0:47) KU Dylan McDuffie 6 yard run (Owen Piepergerdes kick good) 11–61, 7:01 KU 49–16

Statistics	KAN	CIN
First downs	23	21
Plays–yards	51–562	73–342
Rushes–yards	34–312	42–231
Passing yards	250	111
Passing: comp–att–int	13–17–0	16–31–1
Turnovers		
Time of possession	27:19	32:41

Team	Category	Player	Statistics
Kansas	Passing	Jason Bean	13/17, 250 yards, 2 TDs
Kansas	Rushing	Devin Neal	10 carries, 106 yards, 2 TDs
Kansas	Receiving	Lawrence Arnold	3 receptions, 74 yards
Cincinnati	Passing	Emory Jones	15/27, 104 yards, 1 TD, 1 INT
Cincinnati	Rushing	Corey Kiner	18 carries, 106 yards
Cincinnati	Receiving	Dee Wiggins	4 receptions, 27 yards

== Personnel ==
=== Roster and staff ===
2023 Cincinnati Bearcats football team roster
Players
Coaches
Offense

Pos.	#	Name	Class
WR	0	Braden Smith	Sr
WR	2	Dee Wiggins	Sr
WR	3	Evan Prater	Jr
RB	4	Ethan Wright	Sr
QB	5	Emory Jones	Sr
WR	8	Xzavier Henderson	Sr
WR	9	Aaron Turner	Jr
QB	10	Jack Perry	Sr
WR	11	Donovan Ollie	Sr
QB	12	Brady Drogosh	Fr
QB	13	Jacob Hoying	So
WR	14	Barry Jackson Jr.	Fr
QB	15	Will Kocher	Fr
QB	16	Brady Lichtenberg	So
TE	17	Joey Beljan	Sr
TE	18	Chamon Metayer	So
RB	21	Corey Kiner	Jr
RB	22	Ryan Montgomery	Sr
RB	25	Shaun Thomas	So
RB	26	Myles Montgomery	So
RB	29	Manny Covey	Fr
TE	34	Caleb Schmitz	So
RB	36	Victor Dawson	So
RB	42	Stephan Byrd	Fr
TE	45	Barak Faulk	Jr
OL	50	Evan Tengesdahl	Fr
OL	53	Gavin Gerhardt	Jr
OL	54	Dartanyan Tinsley	Sr
OL	55	Mao Glynn II	So
OL	56	Deondre Buford	Jr
OL	58	Trevor Radosevich	Sr
OL	61	Luke Dalton	Fr
OL	62	Matt Mason	Fr
OL	66	Landon Fickell	So
OL	67	Luke Kendra	Jr
OL	69	Cam Jones	Sr
OL	71	Judea Milon	Jr
OL	74	Phillip Wilder	Jr
OL	75	John Williams	Jr
OL	76	Mitch Raifsnider	So
OL	77	Jonathan Harder	Fr
OL	78	Grant Edgington	Fr
OL	79	Ethan Green	Fr
WR	80	Chris Scott	Jr
WR	81	Michael Mussari	Fr
TE	82	Michael McCalmont	Jr
WR	83	Ty Perkins	Fr
WR	84	Sterling Berkhalter	Jr
WR	85	Jiair Thomas	Sr
WR	86	Lesley Andoh	Fr
TE	88	Payten Singletary	Jr
TE	89	Jesse Meyer	Fr

Defense

Pos.	#	Name	Class
DL	0	Jowon Briggs	Sr
CB	1	Jordan Young	So
DL	2	Dontay Corleone	So
LB	3	Deshawn Pace	Sr
DL	4	Malik Vann	Sr
S	5	D.J. Taylor	Jr
LB	6	Dorian Jones	Sr
CB	7	Sammy Anderson Jr.	Jr
S	8	Isiah Cox	So
OLB	9	Daniel Grzesiak	Sr
S	10	Bryon Threats	Jr
S	11	Jayden Davis	Fr
CB	12	Justin Harris	Sr
DE	13	Kyree Moyston	So
CB	14	Rayquan Adkins	Fr
CB	15	Taj Ward	Sr
DB	16	Jabril White	Jr
OLB	17	Brian Simms III	Fr
LB	18	Trevor Carter	Fr
OLB	19	Tyler Gillison	Fr
CB	20	Oliver Bridges	Fr
CB	21	Kalen Carroll	Fr
LB	22	Jonathan Thompson	Fr
LB	23	Daved Jones Jr	Jr
CB	24	Todd Bumphis	Jr
CB	27	Ken Willis	Fr
DB	30	Au'braylen Million	Fr
LB	32	James Camden	Jr
DE	33	C.J. Doggette	Fr
OLB	37	Trevor Adams	So
OLB	38	Nijal Mooney	So
LB	39	Cincear Lewis	Fr
DE	40	Kamari Burns	Fr
LB	41	Quinn Staten	Fr
LB	42	Dion Hunter	Jr
S	43	George Udo	Sr
OLB	44	Jah-Mal Williams	So
S	46	Antwan Peek Jr.	Fr
LB	49	Jack Dingle	So
LB	50	Jackson Bruscianelli	Sr
DL	51	Ben Blevins	Jr
DL	57	Ryan Mullaney	Sr
DT	90	Jalen Hunt	Sr
DL	91	Drew Logan	Fr
DL	92	Derrick Shepard Jr.	Fr
DT	94	Keilan Smith	Fr
DE	95	Justin Wodtly	Jr
DL	96	Dominique Perry	Jr
DE	97	Eric Phillips	Sr
DE	99	Rob Jackson	So

Special teams

Pos.	#	Name	Class
P	31	Mason Fletcher	Jr
K	33	Carter Brown	So
P	35	Brady Young	So
H/K	39	Bryce Burton	Sr
K	47	Rory Bell	Jr
LS	48	Weston Simmons	Fr
P	52	Connor Ingram	So
K	63	Nathan Hawks	Jr
LS	85	Triston O'Brien	So
LS	96	Cayson Pfeiffer	Sr

Head coach

- Scott Satterfield (Appalachian State) – 1st year

Coordinators/assistant coaches

- Bryan Brown (Mississippi)
  1st year – (Associate head coach/Defensive coordinator)
- Brad Glenn (Clemson)
  1st year – (Offensive coordinator/Wide receivers)
- Kerry Coombs (Dayton)
  2nd year (7th overall) – (Special teams coordinator/Cornerbacks)
- Nate Fuqua (Wofford)
  1st year – (Co-defensive coordinator/Outside linebackers)
- Cortney Braswell (Liberty)
  1st year – (Linebackers)
- Nick Cardwell (Appalachian State)
  1st year – (Offensive line)
- Walter Stewart (Cincinnati)
  2nd year – (Defensive line)
- De'Rail Sims (Pikeville)
  1st year – (Running backs)
- Pete Thomas (NC State)
  1st year – (Quarterbacks)

Legend

- (C) Team captain
- (S) Suspended
- (I) Ineligible
- Injured
- Redshirt

Roster

== Awards and honors ==
Big 12 Weekly Honors
Date	Player	Class	Position	Award	Ref.
September 1	Emory Jones	RS-Sr	QB	Big 12 Offensive Player of the Week; Big 12 Newcomer of the Week	

=== All-Big 12 ===
All-Big 12
Player	Position	1st/2nd team
Luke Kandra	OL	2nd
Dontay Corleone	DL	2nd
HM = Honorable mention. Source:
