= Adetomiwa Adebawore =

American football player (born 2001)

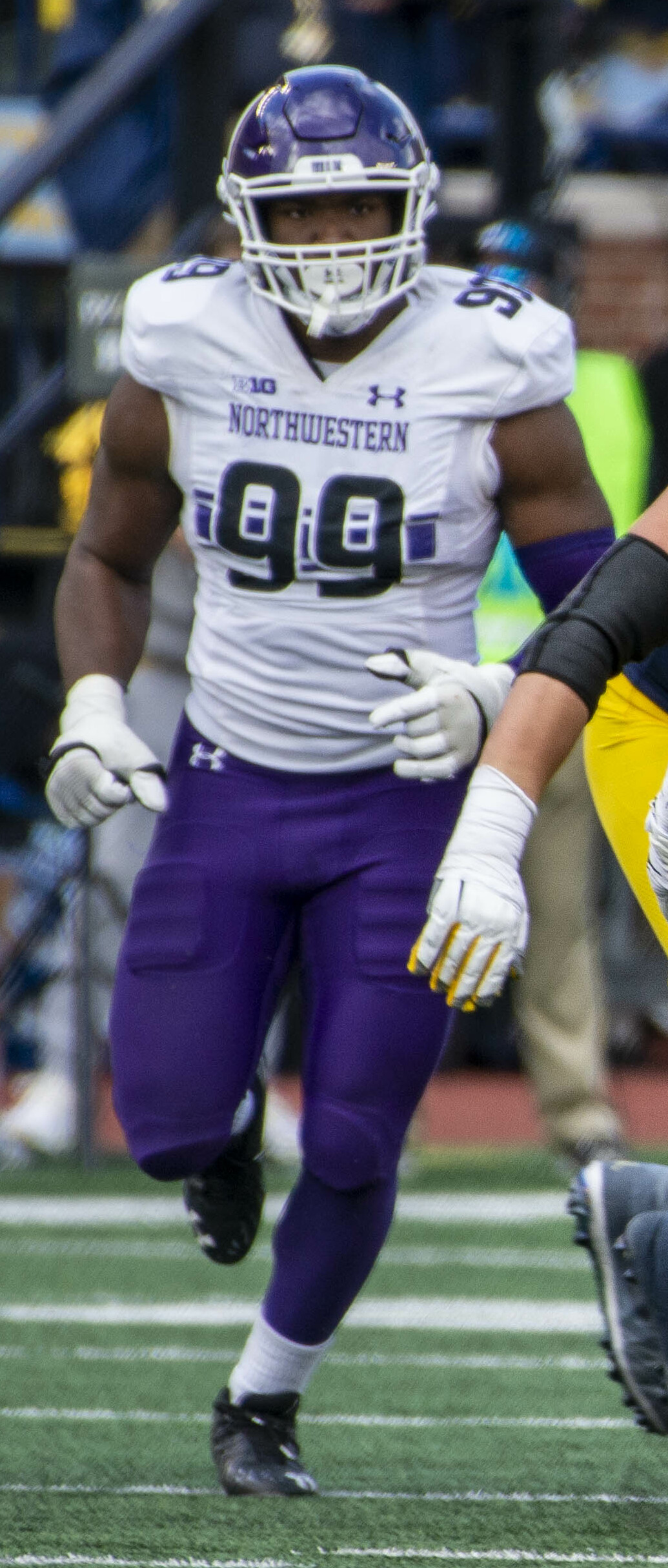
- Adebawore with Northwestern in 2021

No. 95 – Indianapolis Colts
- Position: Defensive tackle
- Roster status: Active

Personal information
- Born: March 4, 2001 (age 25); Kansas City, Missouri, U.S.
- Listed height: 6 ft 2 in (1.88 m)
- Listed weight: 282 lb (128 kg)

Career information
- High school: North Kansas City (North Kansas City, Missouri)
- College: Northwestern (2019–2022)
- NFL draft: 2023: 4th round, 110th overall pick

Career history
- Indianapolis Colts (2023–present)

Awards and highlights
- Third-team All-Big Ten (2022)

Career NFL statistics as of Week 10, 2026
- Total tackles: 72
- Sacks: 10.5
- Fumble recoveries: 2
- Pass deflections: 3
- Defensive touchdowns: 1
- Stats at Pro Football Reference

Adetomiwa Adebawore (add-E-TOMMY-wah add-E-BAR-eh; born March 4, 2001) is an American professional football defensive tackle for the Indianapolis Colts of the National Football League (NFL). He played college football for the Northwestern Wildcats and was selected by the Colts in the fourth round of the 2023 NFL draft.

== Early life ==
Adebawore was born on March 4, 2001, in Kansas City, Missouri, and attended North Kansas City High School. He was rated a three-star recruit and committed to play college football at Northwestern over offers from Washington State, Navy, and Tulane.

== College career ==
Adebawore played in eight games during his freshman season at Northwestern, recording six tackles and one sack. He became a starter for the Wildcats during his sophomore season and finished the year with 17 tackles, six tackles for loss, and two sacks. Adebawore was named honorable mention All-Big Ten Conference as a junior after leading the team with 4.5 sacks and 8.5 tackles for loss. He was named third team All-Big Ten as a senior after recording 38 tackles, nine tackles for loss, five sacks, and two forced fumbles. Adebawore played in the 2023 Senior Bowl.

== Professional career ==
Pre-draft measurables
Height	Weight	Arm length	Hand span	Wingspan	40-yard dash	10-yard split	20-yard split	20-yard shuttle	Three-cone drill	Vertical jump	Broad jump	Bench press
6 ft 1 5/8 in (1.87 m)	282 lb (128 kg)	33 7/8 in (0.86 m)	10 1/2 in (0.27 m)	6 ft 9 5/8 in (2.07 m)	4.49 s	1.61 s	2.62 s	4.26 s	7.13 s	37.5 in (0.95 m)	10 ft 5 in (3.18 m)	27 reps
All values from NFL Combine/Pro Day

Adebawore was selected by the Indianapolis Colts in the fourth round, 110th overall, of the 2023 NFL draft. As a rookie, he appeared in ten games and recorded 1.5 sacks. In the 2024 season, he appeared in 16 games and finished with one sack.

On November 3, 2026, the Colts signed Adebawore to a two-year, $35 million extension, keeping him with the team through the 2028 season.

== NFL career statistics ==
Legend
**Bold**	Career high

=== Regular season ===
Year	Team	Games		Tackles					Interceptions						Fumbles				
Year	Team	GP	GS	Cmb	Solo	Ast	Sck	TFL	Int	Yds	Avg	Lng	TD	PD	FF	Fum	FR	Yds	TD
2023	IND	10	0	5	4	1	1.5	1	0	0	0.0	0	0	0	0	0	0	0	0
2024	IND	16	0	7	5	2	1.0	3	0	0	0.0	0	0	0	0	0	0	0	0
2025	IND	17	7	36	14	22	4.0	5	0	0	0.0	0	0	0	0	0	1	0	0
Career		43	7	48	23	25	6.5	9	0	0	0.0	0	0	0	0	0	1	0	0

== Personal life ==
Adebawore's parents were born in Nigeria and moved to the United States in the 1990s. His younger brother, Adepoju, plays defensive end for the Oklahoma Sooners. His other younger brother, Adeyeye, is committed to play defensive tackle for the Penn Quakers.
