= Brad Glenn (American football coach) =

American football coach and former player (born 1972)

Current position
- Title: Player Development/Assistant Tight Ends Coach
- Team: Clemson
- Conference: ACC

Biographical details
- Born: January 26, 1972 (age 54); Seneca, South Carolina, U.S.
- Education: Clemson University (1995)

Coaching career (HC unless noted)
- 1995–2000: Greer High School (SC) (OC/QB)
- 2001: Elon (TE)
- 2002–2003: North Greenville (OC)
- 2004: Seneca Senior HS (SC) (OC/QB)
- 2005: Appalachian State (TE)
- 2006–2008: Appalachian State (WR)
- 2009–2011: Appalachian State (QB)
- 2012–2018: Western Carolina (AHC/QC/QB)
- 2019–2021: Georgia State (OC/QB)
- 2022: Virginia Tech (PGC/QB)
- 2023–2025: Cincinnati (OC/WR)
- 2026–present: Clemson (ATE/PD)

Brad L. Glenn (born January 26, 1972) is an American football coach who most recently served as offensive coordinator at Cincinnati. He previously served as the quarterbacks coach and passing game coordinator for Virginia Tech under Coach Brent Pry.

== Early life ==
Glenn was born in Seneca, South Carolina. An alumnus of Clemson University, Glenn owns a bachelor's degree from the university, graduating in 1995

== Coaching career ==
Glenn is a college coaching veteran holding experiences at Appalachian State, Western Carolina, and Georgia State.

After the 2022 season, Glenn became the offensive coordinator at Cincinnati joining the staff of Scott Satterfield whom coached with Glenn from 2005 to 2007 at Appalachian State. At the end of the 2025 season, it was announced that Glenn was not returning to Cincinnati for the 2026 season.
