= Walter Rouse =

American football player (born 2001)

No. 72 – New England Patriots
- Position: Guard
- Roster status: Active

Personal information
- Born: March 9, 2001 (age 25); Silver Spring, Maryland, U.S.
- Listed height: 6 ft 6 in (1.98 m)
- Listed weight: 314 lb (142 kg)

Career information
- High school: Sidwell
- College: Stanford (2019–2022); Oklahoma (2023)
- NFL draft: 2024: 6th round, 177th overall pick

Career history
- Minnesota Vikings (2024–2025); New England Patriots (2026–present)

Career NFL statistics as of 2025
- Games played: 8
- Stats at Pro Football Reference

Walter Rouse (born March 9, 2001) is an American professional football guard for the New England Patriots of the National Football League (NFL). He played college football for the Stanford Cardinal and the Oklahoma Sooners.

== Early life ==
Rouse attended high school at Sidwell Friends School. He earned his Eagle Scout rank in 2017 from Troop 1444 in the National Capital Area Council. Coming out of high school, Rouse was rated as a three-star recruit, where he decided to commit to play college football for the Stanford Cardinal.

== College career ==
=== Stanford ===
During Rouse's freshman season in 2019, he played in 12 games while making 11 starts. During the COVID-shortened 2020 season, Rouse would start all six games for the Cardinal. In 2021, Rouse would play in and start all 12 games for Stanford. During the 2022 season, Rouse played in and started ten games for the Cardinal. For his performance on the 2022 season, Rouse earned honorable mention all Pac-12 honors.

During Rouse's career at Stanford, he played in 40 games while making 39 starts.

=== Oklahoma ===
Rouse initially decided to transfer to play for the Nebraska Cornhuskers. However, Rouse decided to flip his commitment to play for the Oklahoma Sooners. During the 2023 season, Rouse played in and started all 12 games for the Sooners, where for his performance he was named Big-12 honorable mention. After the conclusion of the 2023 season, Rouse declared for the 2024 NFL draft.

== Professional career ==
Pre-draft measurables
Height	Weight	Arm length	Hand span	Wingspan	40-yard dash	10-yard split	20-yard split	20-yard shuttle	Three-cone drill	Vertical jump	Broad jump
6 ft 5 3/4 in (1.97 m)	313 lb (142 kg)	35 1/8 in (0.89 m)	10 1/8 in (0.26 m)	6 ft 11 3/4 in (2.13 m)	5.23 s	1.84 s	2.94 s	4.83 s	7.89 s	33.0 in (0.84 m)	9 ft 2 in (2.79 m)
All values from NFL Combine/Pro Day

=== Minnesota Vikings ===
Rouse was selected in the sixth round with the 177th overall pick in the 2024 NFL draft by the Minnesota Vikings.

=== New England Patriots ===
On August 30, 2026, the Vikings traded Rouse and a 2027 seventh-round pick to the New England Patriots in exchange for a 2027 sixth-round selection.

== Personal life ==
Rouse is the grandson of former NBA player Vic Rouse, who is most famous for hitting the game-winning shot as time expired in the overtime period of the 1963 NCAA championship game.
