= Adepoju Adebawore =

American football player

No. 34 – Oklahoma Sooners
- Position: Defensive end
- Class: Senior

Personal information
- Born: c. 2005 (age 20–21); Kansas City, Missouri, U.S.
- Listed height: 6 ft 4 in (1.93 m)
- Listed weight: 260 lb (118 kg)

Career information
- High school: North Kansas City (Missouri)
- College: Oklahoma Sooners (2023–present)
- Stats at ESPN

Adepoju "PJ" Adebawore (born c. 2005) is an American college football defensive end for the Oklahoma Sooners.

== Early life ==
Adebawore was born in Kansas City, Missouri. His parents are of Nigerian descent from the Yoruba tribe. His older brother Adetomiwa Adebawore is a defensive tackle for the Indianapolis Colts. Adepoju focused on basketball as a youth, but turned to football as his older brother became successful. He attended North Kansas City High School and was a consensus five-star edge rusher who was ranked by 247Sports as the No. 9 player overall in the 2023 college football recruiting class. He was also rated at No. nationally by On3.com, No. 20 by ESPN.com, and No. 21 by Rivals.com. He received scholarships offers from multiple schools, including Oklahoma, Georgia, Florida State, Iowa, Miami, Michigan, Oregon, and USC.

== College career ==
Adebawore committed to Oklahoma and enrolled early in January 2023.
