= 2023 Big 12 Championship Game =

2023 Dr Pepper Big 12 Championship Game
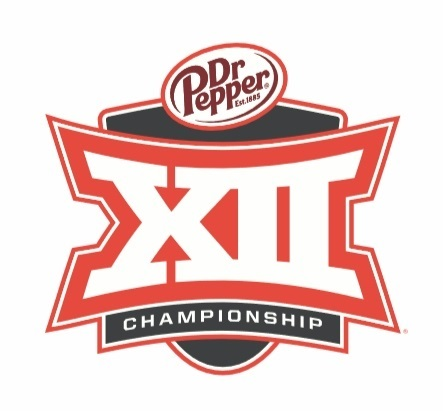
Oklahoma State Cowboys	Texas Longhorns
(9–3)	(11–1)
21	49
Head coach: Mike Gundy	Head coach: Steve Sarkisian
AP / Coaches / CFP; 19 / 19 / 18	AP / Coaches / CFP; 7 / 7 / 7
	1	2	3	4	Total
Oklahoma State	7	7	0	7	21
Texas	21	14	7	7	49
- Date: December 2, 2023
- Season: 2023
- Stadium: AT&T Stadium
- Location: Arlington, Texas
- MVP: Quinn Ewers (QB, Texas)
- Favorite: Texas by 15.5
- Referee: Derek Anderson
- Halftime show: Nelly
- Attendance: 84,523

United States TV coverage
- Network: ABC; ESPN Radio
- Announcers: ABC: Sean McDonough (play-by-play), Greg McElroy (analyst) and Molly McGrath (sideline reporter); ESPN Radio: Sean Kelley (play-by-play), Max Starks (analyst) and Mike Peasley (sideline reporter)

International TV coverage
- Network: ESPN Brazil
- Announcers: Thiago Alves (play-by-play) and Deivis Chiodini (analyst)

2023 Big 12 Conference football standings
	Conf.			Overall
Team	W		L	W		L
No. 3 Texas y$^	8	–	1	12	–	2
No. 16 Oklahoma State y	7	–	2	10	–	4
No. 15 Oklahoma	7	–	2	10	–	3
Iowa State	6	–	3	7	–	6
No. 18 Kansas State	6	–	3	9	–	4
West Virginia	6	–	3	9	–	4
Texas Tech	5	–	4	7	–	6
No. 23 Kansas	5	–	4	9	–	4
UCF	3	–	6	6	–	7
TCU	3	–	6	5	–	7
Houston	2	–	7	4	–	8
BYU	2	–	7	5	–	7
Baylor	2	–	7	3	–	9
Cincinnati	1	–	8	3	–	9
Championship: Texas 49, Oklahoma State 21
^ – College Football Playoff participant; $ – Conference champion; y – Championship game participant; Rankings from AP Poll

The 2023 Big 12 Championship Game was a college football game played on December 2, 2023, at AT&T Stadium in Arlington, Texas. It was the 22nd edition of the Big 12 Championship Game, and determined the champion of the Big 12 Conference for the 2023 season. The game began at 11:12 a.m. CST and aired on ABC, garnering an average viewership of 7.89 million people. The game featured the Texas Longhorns and the Oklahoma State Cowboys, respectively ranked first and second in the conference standings heading into the game. Texas entered the game seeking its fourth Big 12 conference title, while Oklahoma State entered seeking its second.

The higher-ranked Longhorns were heavy favorites to win the game, with spreads favoring Texas by at least two touchdowns. Texas quickly accumulated a large lead over Oklahoma State in the first half, leading 21–7 at the end of the first quarter and 35–14 at the end of the second quarter. The 49 points scored by the two teams in the first half were the most in a single half of any Big 12 title game. Texas quarterback Quinn Ewers threw four touchdown passes in the half, tying the record for the most touchdown passes thrown in a Big 12 championship game. The second half featured less scoring and the Longhorns ultimately won 49–21. Ewers's 452 passing yards set a Big 12 title game record; he was named Most Outstanding Player of the match. Following the game, Texas took the No. 3 spot in the College Football Playoff (CFP) rankings, earning a playoff berth for the first time in the school's history. Oklahoma State fell to No. 20 and accepted an invitation to the 2023 Texas Bowl.

== Overview ==
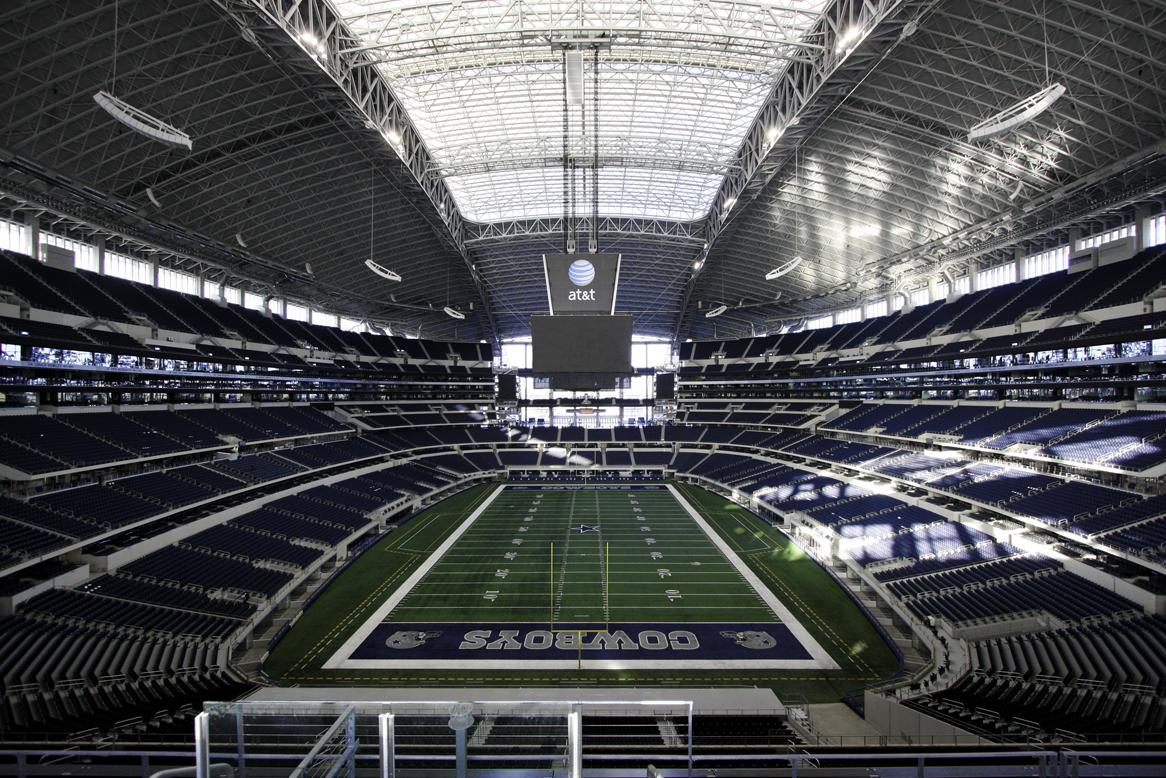
AT&T Stadium in Arlington, Texas, has hosted the championship game annually since 2017.

The Big 12 Championship Game matches the top two teams in the Big 12 Conference – as determined by in-conference winning percentage and tiebreaker rules if necessary – to designate the conference's champion. The game is held at AT&T Stadium in Arlington, Texas, as part of a contract between the conference and the stadium extending through 2030. AT&T Stadium was the site of the Big 12 Championship Game in 2009 and 2010 and has hosted the game since the reinstatement of the championship game in 2017.

The 2023 Big 12 Championship Game featured the Texas Longhorns, with an 8–1 conference record, representing the No. 1 seed, and the Oklahoma State Cowboys, with a 7–2 conference record, representing the No. 2 seed. Accordingly, Texas was designated as the home team and Oklahoma State the away team. This was the seventh Big 12 title game appearance for Texas and their first since 2018. They were 3–3 overall in previous appearances. This was the second Big 12 title game appearance for Oklahoma State, with their only previous one being in 2021. They were 0–1 in previous appearances. Sportsbooks generally opened with two-touchdown spreads favoring Texas, marking one of the larger spreads among conference championship games in 2023; Texas remained roughly 15-point favorites headed into the game. Media outlets viewed the title matchup as consequential for the selection of Texas and Oklahoma State in bowl games and potentially influential for a possible College Football Playoff (CFP) bid for Texas, contingent on the outcome of other conference championship games. Tickets for seating for the game were sold out by November 29.

On November 16, 2023, the Big 12 began a collaboration with professional wrestling promotion, WWE, which introduced custom-made championship title belt for the 2023 Big 12 Football Championship Most Outstanding Player, presented on-field at the conclusion of the game by The Undertaker. Additionally, a co-branded logo promoting both the Big 12 and WWE was featured throughout the venue and on the field.

=== Team selection ===
The Big 12 Conference approved a new tiebreaking procedure for the 2023 season in August 2023 following the addition of new member schools. Towards the end of the conference season, a multi-way tie in conference records between the Iowa State Cyclones, Kansas State Wildcats, Oklahoma Sooners, and Oklahoma State Cowboys, all with two conference losses, prompted the conference to clarify ambiguous wording in its tiebreaking rules. While use of head-to-head results to resolve ties appeared to only apply if all tied teams played each other, the conference issued a clarification on November 15 indicating that not all tied teams needed to be common opponents for head-to-head results to apply. Although the original wording appeared to favor a potential championship game berth for Kansas State, the clarification gave Oklahoma State an edge given their wins over Kansas State and Oklahoma.

On November 19, the Austin American-Statesman reported that Texas had clinched a spot in the championship following a win against Iowa State, but a Big 12 official clarified that Texas had not secured a berth in the game. The conference later outlined some resulting championship game matchups based on the outcomes of conference games in the final week of the regular season, with multiple outcomes resulting in as many as four teams tied for spots in the game. Texas clinched the No. 1 seed following their win against the Texas Tech Red Raiders on November 24. The result also eliminated Kansas State from championship game contention; Kansas State lost at home to Iowa State anyway. Oklahoma State clinched the No. 2 seed following their win against the BYU Cougars on November 25.

==== Texas ====
The Texas Longhorns finished their 2022 season with an 8–5 record, losing their final matchup against the Washington Huskies in the 2022 Alamo Bowl. Early in 2023, Texas reached an agreement with the Big 12 to join the Southeastern Conference in 2024, making 2023 their final season in the Big 12. The Longhorns were considered a possible playoff contender and heavy favorites for the Big 12 conference title entering the 2023 season, ranking first in the Big 12 preseason media poll for the first time since 2009 despite the departure of two players in the 2023 NFL draft accounting for 87 percent of Texas's 2022 rushing yardage. Texas began the season ranked No. 11 in the preseason AP Poll and No. 12 in the preseason Coaches Poll. After winning their opening contest against Rice, the Longhorns defeated then-No. 3 Alabama 34–24 at Bryant–Denny Stadium in a game described as a signature win for both the program and head coach Steve Sarkisian by media outlets. Texas rose to No. 4 in the AP Poll following the win and ultimately attained the No. 3 spot in the AP Poll and the No. 4 spot in the Coaches Poll after consecutive victories against Wyoming, Baylor, and then-No. 24 Kansas to close out-of-conference play and open conference play. The Longhorns's placement in either poll was their highest since 2009. The Longhorns also began a season with five consecutive wins for the first time since 2009.

Texas was defeated by Oklahoma 34–30 in the Red River Rivalry on October 7. The loss knocked Texas out of their position atop the Big 12 conference standings and resulted in the Longhorns dropping to No. 9 in the AP Poll and No. 11 in the Coaches Poll. Texas narrowly beat Houston in a game that saw starting quarterback Quinn Ewers suffer a shoulder injury. Maalik Murphy assumed the quarterback role in Ewers's relief, starting at quarterback in a win against BYU and in a close overtime victory against then-No. 23 Kansas State. The season's first CFP ranking placed the Longhorns at No. 7. With Oklahoma losing to Kansas, Texas and Oklahoma entered November tied for first in the conference standings. Ewers returned from injury to lead the Longhorns to a close 29–26 victory at TCU. However, running back Jonathon Brooks sustained a season-ending injury during the game; Brooks was Texas's leading rusher and at the time the sixth leading rusher in the FBS. An Oklahoma State loss to UCF and an earlier Oklahoma loss to Oklahoma State led to Texas leading the conference standings after the win against TCU. Texas subsequently won against Iowa State and clinched a spot in the conference title game following their 57–7 defeat of Texas Tech on November 24. Texas entered the championship game ranked No. 7 in both the AP and Coaches polls. The Longhorns also entered the game as the No. 7 team in the CFP ranking, having held that position each week since the release of the first CFP ranking in 2023. The Texas defense ranked first across the FBS in preventing third down conversions and scores from within the red zone. Eight Longhorns players were named to the all-Big 12 first team and three were named to the all-Big 12 second team; four players earned all-conference distinctions, including T'Vondre Sweat as Defensive Player of the Year.

==== Oklahoma State ====
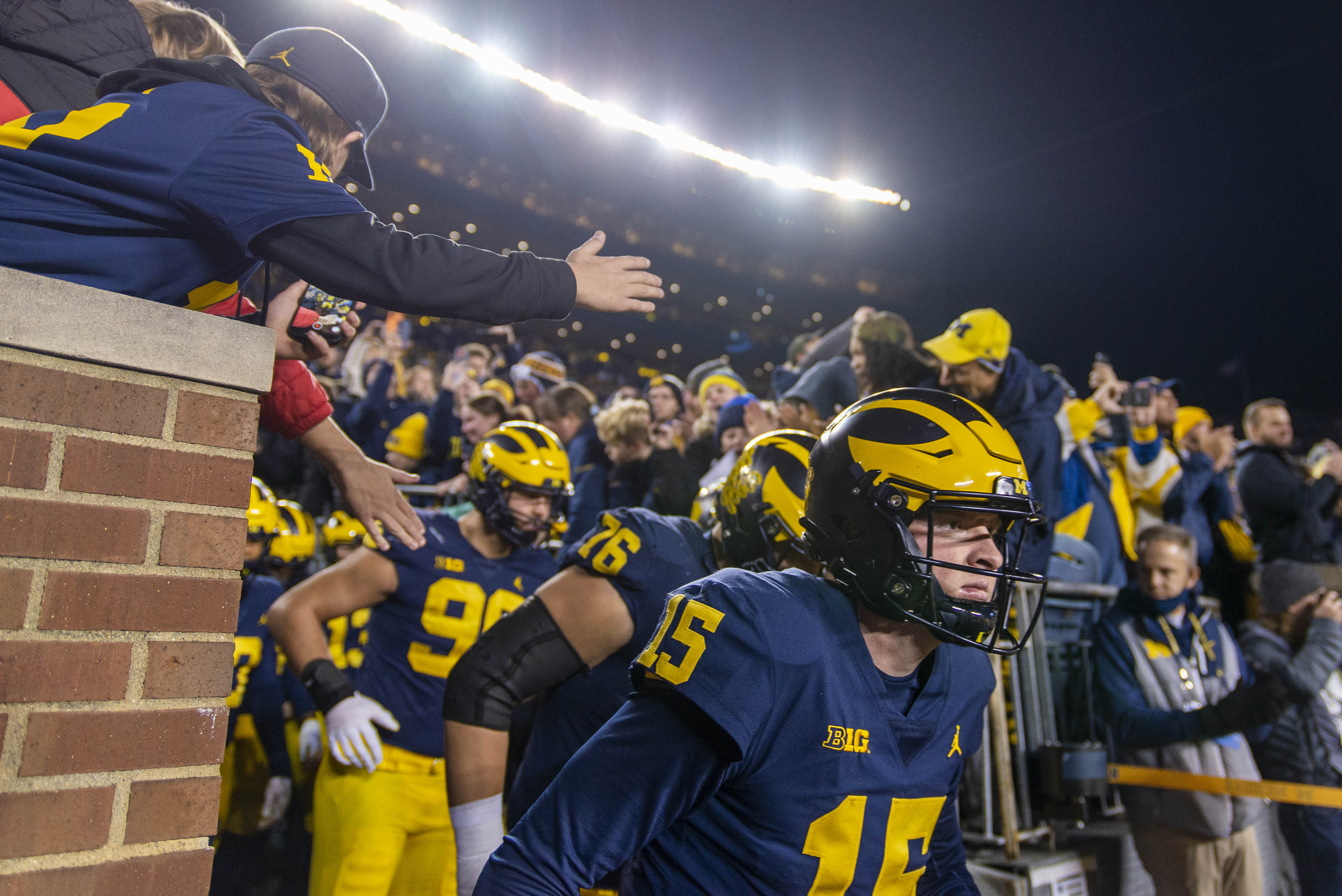
Alan Bowman (pictured with the Michigan Wolverines in 2021) was the starting quarterback for Oklahoma State for most of the 2023 season.

The Oklahoma State Cowboys finished their 2022 season with a 7–6 record. Both the 2022 and 2023 seasons were preceded by numerous players transferring out of the program, casting doubt on the team's success. The Cowboys were ranked seventh in the Big 12 preseason media poll and were unranked in both the preseason AP and Coaches top-25 polls. The Cowboys received 12 votes in the preseason Coaches Poll. Oklahoma State's offensive line and wide receiver personnel suffered numerous injuries in the first three games of the season. Three different quarterbacks took snaps during those games. Oklahoma State won their first two out-of-conference games against Central Arkansas and Arizona State. However, the Cowboys lost 7–33 in an upset to South Alabama the following week. The game marked the Cowboys's first non-conference loss since 2016 and only the third non-conference loss under the tenure of head coach Mike Gundy. The blowout loss was characterized by Oklahoma State's inability to run the ball or defend against the run.

Following the surprising loss, Gundy instated a run-first pistol offense in contrast to the run-pass option offense utilized by Gundy in previous years. Alan Bowman and Ollie Gordon II were selected as the Cowboys's starting quarterback and running back, respectively. Although Oklahoma State lost 27–34 to Iowa State to open Big 12 Conference play, the Cowboys saw improved offensive production with 409 yards of total offense and nearly overcame a 14-point deficit in the game's final three minutes. Gordon had a breakout game against the Cyclones, rushing for 121 yards. The Cowboys followed the loss to the Cyclones with five consecutive wins against Big 12 opponents. Four of Oklahoma State's wins in the streak were as underdogs, including a 39–32 win against then-No. 23 Kansas and a 27–24 win against then-No. 9 Oklahoma in the final scheduled edition of the Bedlam Series. The Cowboys were ranked No. 22 in the season's inaugural CFP ranking entering the rivalry game against the Sooners and climbed to No. 15 following the upset victory.

Oklahoma State's winning streak ended with a 3–45 loss to the UCF Knights in a game that included four turnovers, including three in the first half. The Cowboys defeated the Houston Cougars 43–30 the following week after trailing 9–23 in the second quarter. Oklahoma State clinched a spot in the conference championship game following their double-overtime defeat of BYU on November 25. They last won the Big 12 in 2011, and their last appearance in the Big 12 Championship Game was in 2021. Oklahoma State entered the championship game ranked No. 19 in both the AP and Coaches polls and No. 18 in the CFP ranking. Gordon led the FBS with 1,580 rushing yards, having rushed for more than 100 yards in all but one Big 12 conference game. Cowboys linebacker Nickolas Martin led the Big 12 in tackles with 120. Two Cowboys players were named to the all-Big 12 first team and three were named to the all-Big 12 second team; Gordon II was awarded Offensive Player of the Year and Gundy was named Coach of the Year.

== Game summary ==
The 22nd edition of the Big 12 Championship Game was held on December 2, 2023, and featured 84,523 people in attendance, a Big 12 title game record. The game was broadcast on ABC, drawing an average of 7.89 million television viewers.

=== First half ===
Texas won the pregame coin toss to determine starting possession and elected to receive the second half kickoff, resulting in Texas kicking off to Oklahoma State to begin the game at 11:12 a.m. CST. The Cowboys's opening drive ended with a three-and-out following three consecutive incomplete passes by Cowboys quarterback Alan Bowman. A kicking interference penalty on the subsequent punt was followed by a 39-yard scoring drive by the Longhorns, culminating in a 10-yard touchdown pass from quarterback Quinn Ewers to wide receiver Adonai Mitchell. After forcing a second non-scoring drive from Oklahoma State, Texas took a 14–0 lead on a drive that included a 54-yard reception by wide receiver Xavier Worthy and a 24-yard touchdown reception by tight end Ja'Tavion Sanders on a reverse flea flicker. A defensive pass interference penalty on the ensuing Cowboys drive and a 34-yard pass to Oklahoma State wide receiver Rashod Owens set up a 5-yard touchdown pass to Brennan Presley to narrow Texas's lead to seven points. Texas subsequently completed another scoring drive, with Ewers recording his third touchdown with a 2-yard pass to defensive tackle T'Vondre Sweat. A Fox Sports article named the touchdown pass the play of the game. The Cowboys had the ball to end the first quarter, with the Longhorns leading 21–7 at the quarter's end.

Longhorns defensive back Kitan Crawford intercepted a pass into triple coverage by Bowman at the Longhorns's 5-yard line on the first play of the second quarter. The Longhorns would take advantage of the turnover, completing a 7-play and 95-yard drive that included a 62-yard gain off of a pass to Mitchell and a 10-yard touchdown run by running back CJ Baxter to widen Texas's lead back to three touchdowns. The Longhorns forced another three-and-out and regained possession, but linebacker Nickolas Martin intercepted Ewers in Texas territory, ending Texas's only non-scoring drive of the first half. The 27-yard interception return gave the Cowboys a short field, setting up a 7-yard touchdown reception by wide receiver Rashod Owens. Texas reclaimed their three-touchdown lead with an 8-yard touchdown pass to running back Jaydon Blue on the subsequent drive, giving Ewers four touchdown passes. On Oklahoma State's ensuing drive, Texas recovered a fumble by wide receiver Leon Johnson III at the Oklahoma State 47-yard line after catching a pass. Despite advancing to the Oklahoma State 25-yard line, a Texas delay of game moved the Longhorns back five yards and preceded a missed field goal by Longhorns kicker Bert Auburn, ending a streak of 19 successful field goals. The Cowboys had the final drive of the first half, but advanced only 12 yards before kneeling to close out the half. Texas led 35–14 at the end of the second quarter. The combined 49 points were the most scored in a half of a Big 12 Championship Game, ahead of the previous record of 46 set in the 2001 Big 12 Championship Game.

=== Halftime show ===
Nelly performed at the title game halftime show, the first in the title game's history.

=== Second half ===
With a sizable lead, Texas's gameplay in the second half was mostly predicated on running out the clock. Texas received the opening kickoff of the second half. Longhorns defensive back Derek Williams Jr. was ejected from the game for targeting on the kickoff return. Both Texas and Oklahoma State's first drives of the second half ended in punts, with Texas's being their only punt of the game. The first score of the second half was off of a 57-yard rush along the sideline by Longhorns running back Keilan Robinson in the third quarter. Longhorns wide receiver Xavier Worthy injured his ankle early in the fourth quarter, putting him out of the game. Texas scored their final points of the game with an 11-yard touchdown run by Robinson at the end of a 15-play and 7-minute drive in the fourth quarter, giving the Longhorns a 49–14 lead. The Cowboys scored on their final, 89-yard drive on a 3-yard touchdown pass from Bowman to Owens to bring the score to 49–21. Oklahoma State did not subsequently attempt an onside kick, leaving Texas with the ball to end the game with snaps taken by backup quarterbacks Maalik Murphy and Arch Manning on the game's last drive.

With the win, Texas clinched the Big 12 championship title for the first time since 2009 and their fourth time overall. The Longhorns accumulated 662 yards of total offense compared to 281 from the Cowboys, and had an over 40-minute time of possession. The Longhorns were the only team from a Power Five conference in 20 years to gain 400 yards and 35 points in a single half of a conference title game. Ewers was named the Big 12 Championship's Most Outstanding Player. His 452 passing yards – a career high – set a Big 12 Championship Game record-high previously held by Sam Bradford. His four touchdowns – all in the first half – were tied with Baker Mayfield and Ell Roberson for the most in a Big 12 title game. Longhorns wide receivers Ja'Tavion Sanders and Adonai Mitchell recorded over 100 yards receiving apiece. Cowboys wide receivers Owens and Presley accounted for 178 of Oklahoma State's 281 yards. Ollie Gordon II was held to only 34 yards on 13 carries.

=== Scoring summary ===
2023 Big 12 Championship Game
No. 18 Oklahoma State Cowboys (9–3, 7–2) vs. No. 7 Texas Longhorns (11–1, 8–1)

Quarter	1	2	3	4	Total
No. 18 Oklahoma State	7	7	0	7	21
No. 7 Texas	21	14	7	7	49

at AT&T Stadium • Arlington, TX

- Date: Saturday, December 2, 2023
- Game time: 11:00 a.m. CST (kickoff 11:12 a.m., end of game 2:37 p.m.)
- Game weather: Indoor
- Game attendance: 84,523 (Big 12 Championship Game record)
- Referee: Derek Anderson
- TV announcers (ABC): Sean McDonough, Greg McElroy, Molly McGrath

Scoring summary

Quarter	Time	Drive			Team	Scoring information	Score	
Quarter	Time	Plays	Yards	TOP	Team	Scoring information	Oklahoma State	Texas
1	12:52	4	39	01:29	Texas	Adonai Mitchell 10-yard touchdown reception from Quinn Ewers, Bert Auburn kick good	0	7
1	08:34	4	84	01:54	Texas	Ja'Tavion Sanders 24-yard touchdown reception from Quinn Ewers, Bert Auburn kick good	0	14
1	05:36	8	75	02:58	Oklahoma State	Brennan Presley 5-yard touchdown reception from Alan Bowman, Logan Ward kick good	7	14
1	01:41	9	77	03:49	Texas	T'Vondre Sweat 2-yard touchdown reception from Quinn Ewers, Bert Auburn kick good	7	21
2	11:40	7	95	03:12	Texas	CJ Baxter 10-yard touchdown run, Bert Auburn kick good	7	28
2	05:50	2	3	01:16	Oklahoma State	Rashod Owens 7-yard touchdown reception from Alan Bowman, Logan Ward kick good	14	28
2	02:11	10	82	03:34	Texas	Jaydon Blue 8-yard touchdown reception from Quinn Ewers, Bert Auburn kick good	14	35
3	03:33	6	79	03:07	Texas	Keilan Robinson 57-yard touchdown run, Bert Auburn kick good	14	42
4	10:38	15	88	06:47	Texas	Keilan Robinson 11-yard touchdown run, Bert Auburn kick good	14	49
4	06:26	10	89	04:05	Oklahoma State	Rashod Owens 3-yard touchdown reception from Alan Bowman, Logan Ward kick good	21	49
"TOP" = time of possession. For other American football terms, see Glossary of American football.							21	49

== Statistics ==
=== Team statistics ===
Team statistical comparison
Statistic	Oklahoma State	Texas
First downs	13	33
First downs rushing	2	12
First downs passing	10	20
First downs penalty	1	1
Third down efficiency	3–10	10–16
Fourth down efficiency	1–1	2–2
Total plays–net yards	56–281	87–662
Rushing attempts–net yards	18–31	40–198
Yards per rush	1.7	5.0
Yards passing	250	464
Pass completions–attempts	22–38	36–47
Interceptions thrown	1	1
Punt returns–total yards	1–8	0–0
Kickoff returns–total yards	5–89	2–34
Punts–total yardage	5–214	1–51
Fumbles–lost	1–1	0–0
Penalties–yards	3–24	7–67
Time of possession	19:54	40:06

=== Individual statistics ===
Oklahoma State statistics
Cowboys passing
	C–A	Yds	TD–INT
Alan Bowman	22–38	250	3–1
Cowboys rushing
	Car	Yds	TD
Ollie Gordon II	13	34	0
Sesi Vailahi	2	7	0
Alan Bowman	1	−2	0
(Team)	2	–8	0
Cowboys receiving
	Rec	Yds	TD
Brennan Presley	9	93	1
Rashod Owens	4	85	2
Ollie Gordon II	4	54	0
Sesi Vailahi	2	12	0
Leon Johnson III	2	7	0
Jaden Bray	1	–1	0

Texas statistics
Longhorns passing
	C–A	Yds	TD–INT
Quinn Ewers	35–46	452	4–1
Maalik Murphy	1–1	12	0–0
Longhorns rushing
	Car	Yds	TD
Keilan Robinson	4	75	2
CJ Baxter	13	43	1
Jaydon Blue	10	33	0
Savion Red	5	19	0
Ja'Tavion Sanders	1	12	0
Quintrevion Wisner	3	11	0
Quinn Ewers	3	6	0
(Team)	1	–1	0
Longhorns receiving
	Rec	Yds	TD
Adonai Mitchell	6	109	1
Ja'Tavion Sanders	8	105	1
Xavier Worthy	6	86	0
Jordan Whittington	4	48	0
Jaydon Blue	3	38	1
CJ Baxter	4	33	0
Keilan Robinson	2	20	0
Johntay Cook II	1	12	0
Gunnar Helm	1	11	0
T'Vondre Sweat	1	2	1

== Postgame effects ==
Texas's win in the 2023 Big 12 Championship Game brought the team to a 12–1 record, marking their best season record since 2009. Media outlets considered Texas to have remained in playoff contention with the championship victory. Although no team outside of the top six in the penultimate CFP rankings had earned a playoff berth in prior years, the unprecedented number of teams with one or fewer losses and Alabama's defeat of top-ranked Georgia in the 2023 SEC Championship Game appeared to sustain Texas's playoff bid. The Longhorns climbed to the No. 3 in the AP Poll and rose to a tie with Alabama at No. 4 in the Coaches Poll after their championship victory. The final CFP ranking on December 3 granted Texas the No. 3 seed in the 2023–24 College Football Playoff, placing the Longhorns in a semifinal match against Washington in the 2024 Sugar Bowl. Boo Corrigan, chair of the CFP Selection Committee, cited the Big 12 Championship Game result as part of the committee's rationale for placing Texas in the playoff.

Oklahoma State dropped to a 9–4 record for the season. The Cowboys fell to No. 20 in the final CFP ranking, No. 21 in the Coaches Poll, and No. 22 in the AP Poll. With the higher-ranked Oklahoma Sooners remaining outside the top-11 in the final CFP ranking and therefore missing out on a New Year's Six bowl game, Oklahoma State was granted a berth in the 2023 Texas Bowl to face Texas A&M following the championship loss, marking the 18th bowl game of Gundy's head coaching tenure.

A dead longhorn was found on the lawn of an Oklahoma State fraternity one day before the game, prompting concern from UT students at the time of the discover. Four OSU students were later arrested for the crime.

== See also ==
- List of Big 12 Conference football champions
