= Kam Dewberry =

American football player (born 2004)

No. 61 – Atlanta Falcons
- Position: Guard
- Roster status: Practice squad

Personal information
- Born: April 23, 2004 (age 22)
- Listed height: 6 ft 4 in (1.93 m)
- Listed weight: 332 lb (151 kg)

Career information
- High school: Atascocita (Humble, Texas)
- College: Texas A&M (2022–2024); Alabama (2025)
- NFL draft: 2026: undrafted

Career history
- Atlanta Falcons (2026–present)*
- * Offseason or practice squad member only
- Stats at Pro Football Reference

Kam Dewberry (born April 23‚ 2004) is an American professional football guard for the Atlanta Falcons in the National Football League (NFL)․ He played college football at Texas A&M and Alabama․ He signed with the Falcons as an undrafted free agent in 2026․

== Early life ==
Dewberry is from Humble‚ Texas‚ and played football at Atascocita High School under head coach Craig Stump․ He earned MaxPreps Sophomore All-American honors in 2019 and was a starter at right tackle as a senior as he helped the team reach the third round of the Texas Class 6A Division I playoffs․ Dewberry also threw the shot put on the school's track team․

A consensus four-star recruit‚ Dewberry was named to the 2022 Under Armour All-America Game and Polynesian Bowl teams․ He chose Texas A&M University over Texas‚ Oklahoma‚ Alabama‚ Ohio State‚ and LSU․

== College career ==
As a true freshman in 2022‚ Dewberry started five of seven games played‚ including his first start at left guard against South Carolina․ Awards and honors include team Offensive Top Newcomer and Freshman All-American from The Athletic․ In 2023‚ Dewberry started three of 13 games‚ at left guard twice and right guard once‚ against Texas in the 2023 Texas Bowl․ He played in 12 games as a junior in 2024․

Dewberry transferred to the University of Alabama for his last year of college eligibility‚ saying he wanted to play for a team that prepares its players for the NFL․ Dewberry played in 13 of 14 games at left guard for Alabama in 2025․ Over four years in college‚ Dewberry played in 46 games․

== Professional career ==
=== Atlanta Falcons ===
Dewberry‚ who went undrafted in the 2026 NFL draft‚ agreed to an undrafted free-agent contract with the Atlanta Falcons․ Dewberry played right guard in Atlanta's second preseason game‚ an August 22‚ 2026 matchup with the Indianapolis Colts․ Dewberry was released by the Falcons on August 30‚ during final roster cuts. He was re–signed to the team's practice squad the following day․
