= Jaylen Henderson =

American football player (born 2003)

No. 13 – Liberty Flames
- Position: Quarterback
- Class: Redshirt Senior

Personal information
- Born: July 17, 2003 (age 23); Encino, California, U.S.
- Listed height: 6 ft 3 in (1.91 m)
- Listed weight: 227 lb (103 kg)

Career information
- High school: Chaminade
- College: Fresno State (2021–2022); Texas A&M (2023–2024); West Virginia (2025); Liberty (2026–present)
- Stats at ESPN

Jaylen Henderson (born July 17, 2003) is an American college football quarterback for the Liberty Flames. He previously played for the Fresno State Bulldogs, Texas A&M Aggies and West Virginia Mountaineers.

== Early life ==
Henderson attended Chaminade College Preparatory School in San Fernando Valley, California. In his junior year, Henderson passed for 2,664 yards and 20 touchdowns. In his senior season, he threw for 15 touchdowns, before committing to play college football at California State University, Fresno.

== College career ==
Henderson played sparingly for two seasons at Fresno State, appearing in five games, before announcing that he would enter the transfer portal in April 2023.

=== Texas A&M ===
In May 2023, Henderson announced that he would transfer to Texas A&M. He entered the 2023 season, as the third-string quarterback behind Conner Weigman and Max Johnson. However, following injuries to Weigman and Johnson, Henderson was named the team's starting quarterback against Mississippi State. In his first career start, Henderson combined for four total touchdowns, two passing and two rushing, while leading Texas A&M in a 51–10 rout. The following week against Abilene Christian, he passed for 260 yards and two touchdowns, in a 38–10 victory. In his first career start on the road against No. 14 LSU, Henderson passed for 294 yards and two touchdowns in a 30–42 defeat, his first career loss as a starter.

Henderson started the 2023 Texas Bowl, where he suffered an injury on the first play from scrimmage, landing awkwardly on his right arm. He exited the field with a brace over his arm and was replaced by true freshman Marcel Reed. Texas A&M went on to lose the game 23–31 in Henderson's absence.

The following season, Henderson served as the backup to Weigman and Reed, before entering the transfer portal for the second time.

=== West Virginia ===
On January 4, 2025, Henderson announced his decision to transfer to West Virginia University to play for the West Virginia Mountaineers.

=== Statistics ===
Season	Team	Games			Passing								Rushing			
Season	Team	GP	GS	Record	Comp	Att	Pct	Yards	Avg	TD	Int	Rate	Att	Yards	Avg	TD
2021	Fresno State	3	0	0–0	5	8	62.5	49	6.1	0	0	114.0	14	68	4.9	0
2022	Fresno State	2	0	0–0	0	0	0	0	0.0	0	0	0.0	2	-2	-1.0	0
2023	Texas A&M	5	4	2–2	53	78	67.9	715	9.2	6	2	165.2	41	104	5.2	2
2024	Texas A&M	DNP														
2025	West Virginia	5	1	0–1	7	18	38.9	50	2.8	0	0	62.2	29	146	5.0	1
Career		15	5	2−3	65	104	62.5	814	7.8	6	2	143.4	86	316	3.7	3

== Personal life ==
While at Fresno State, Henderson wore the number 13 in honor of his late sister, who died at the age of 13 from Leukemia. Henderson is the cousin of former NFL linebacker Chris Carter.
