= 2023 Texas A&M Aggies football team =

American college football season

2023 Texas A&M Aggies football

Texas Bowl, L 23–31 vs. Oklahoma State
- Conference: Southeastern Conference
- Western Division
- Record: 7–6 (4–4 SEC)
- Head coach: Jimbo Fisher (6th season; first 10 games); Elijah Robinson (interim; remainder of season)
- Offensive coordinator: Bobby Petrino (1st season)
- Co-offensive coordinator: James Coley (2nd season)
- Offensive scheme: Multiple pro-style
- Defensive coordinator: D. J. Durkin (2nd season)
- Co-defensive coordinator: Elijah Robinson (1st season)
- Base defense: 4–3
- Home stadium: Kyle Field

2023 Southeastern Conference football standings
	Conf.			Overall
Team	W		L	W		L
Eastern Division
No. 4 Georgia xy	8	–	0	13	–	1
No. 8 Missouri	6	–	2	11	–	2
No. 17 Tennessee	4	–	4	9	–	4
Kentucky	3	–	5	7	–	6
Florida	3	–	5	5	–	7
South Carolina	3	–	5	5	–	7
Vanderbilt	0	–	8	2	–	10
Western Division
No. 5 Alabama xy$^	8	–	0	12	–	2
No. 9 Ole Miss	6	–	2	11	–	2
No. 12 LSU	6	–	2	10	–	3
Texas A&M	4	–	4	7	–	6
Auburn	3	–	5	6	–	7
Mississippi State	1	–	7	5	–	7
Arkansas	1	–	7	4	–	8
Championship: Alabama 27, Georgia 24
^ – College Football Playoff participant; $ – Conference champion; x – Division champion/co-champions; y – Championship game participant; Rankings from AP Poll

The 2023 Texas A&M Aggies football team represented Texas A&M University in the 2023 NCAA Division I FBS football season. The Aggies played their home games at Kyle Field in College Station, Texas, and competed in the Western Division of the Southeastern Conference (SEC). They were led by Jimbo Fisher in his sixth year as the team's head coach before his firing on November 12, 2023. Defensive line coach and co-defensive coordinator Elijah Robinson served as the team's interim head coach for the final 2 games of the season. This was also to be the final year for the West Division as Texas and Oklahoma joined the SEC in 2024.

== Offseason ==
=== Draft departures ===
Texas A&M players leaving for the NFL Draft
Name	Number	Pos.	Height	Weight	Year	Hometown
De’Von Achane	6	RB	5'-9" ft	185 lbs	Junior	Missouri City, TX
Antonio Johnson	27	S	6'-3" ft	195 lbs	Junior	East Saint Louis, IL
Jaylon Jones	17	CB	6'-2" ft	205 lbs	Junior	Cibolo, TX

=== Recruits ===
College recruiting (2023)
Name	Hometown	School	Height	Weight	Commit date
David Hicks; DL	Katy, TX	Paetow High School	6 ft 4 in (1.93 m)	270 lb (120 kg)	Sep 28, 2022
David Hicks; DL	Recruit ratings: Rivals: 247Sports: ESPN: (92)				
Rueben Owens; RB	El Campo, TX	El Campo High School	5 ft 11 in (1.80 m)	180 lb (82 kg)	Dec 7, 2022
Rueben Owens; RB	Recruit ratings: Rivals: 247Sports: ESPN: (86)				
Chase Bisontis; IOL	Ramsey, NJ	Don Bosco Prep	6 ft 5 in (1.96 m)	290 lb (130 kg)	Jul 24, 2022
Chase Bisontis; IOL	Recruit ratings: Rivals: 247Sports: ESPN: (86)				
Bravion Rogers; CB	La Grange, TX	La Grange High School	5 ft 11 in (1.80 m)	185 lb (84 kg)	Sep 6, 2022
Bravion Rogers; CB	Recruit ratings: Rivals: 247Sports: ESPN: (86)				
Dalton Brooks; S	Shiner, TX	Shiner High School	6 ft 1 in (1.85 m)	175 lb (79 kg)	Jul 30, 2022
Dalton Brooks; S	Recruit ratings: Rivals: 247Sports: ESPN: (85)				
Jayvon Thomas; DB	Dallas, TX	South Oak Cliff High School	5 ft 11 in (1.80 m)	170 lb (77 kg)	Apr 13, 2022
Jayvon Thomas; DB	Recruit ratings: Rivals: 247Sports: ESPN: (84)				
T. J. Shanahan; OT	Austin, TX	Westlake High School	6 ft 4 in (1.93 m)	310 lb (140 kg)	Sep 7, 2022
T. J. Shanahan; OT	Recruit ratings: Rivals: 247Sports: ESPN: (83)				
Raymond Cottrell; WR	Milton, FL	Milton High School	6 ft 3 in (1.91 m)	205 lb (93 kg)	Jan 2, 2023
Raymond Cottrell; WR	Recruit ratings: Rivals: 247Sports: ESPN: (82)				
Marcel Reed; QB-DT	Nashville, TN	Montgomery Bell Academy	6 ft 1 in (1.85 m)	170 lb (77 kg)	Dec 19, 2022
Marcel Reed; QB-DT	Recruit ratings: Rivals: 247Sports: ESPN: (82)				
Micah Tease; WR	Tulsa, OK	Booker T. Washington High School	5 ft 11 in (1.80 m)	170 lb (77 kg)	Dec 21, 2022
Micah Tease; WR	Recruit ratings: Rivals: 247Sports: ESPN: (81)				
Rylan Kennedy; DE	Mansfield, TX	Lake Ridge High School	6 ft 4 in (1.93 m)	210 lb (95 kg)	Dec 12, 2022
Rylan Kennedy; DE	Recruit ratings: Rivals: 247Sports: ESPN: (80)				
Jaden Platt; TE	Fort Worth, TX	V.R. Eaton High School	6 ft 5 in (1.96 m)	235 lb (107 kg)	Dec 20, 2022
Jaden Platt; TE	Recruit ratings: Rivals: 247Sports: ESPN: (80)				
Daymion Sanford; OLB	Katy, TX	Patricia E. Paetow High School	6 ft 2 in (1.88 m)	210 lb (95 kg)	Jun 27, 2022
Daymion Sanford; OLB	Recruit ratings: Rivals: 247Sports: ESPN: (80)				
Naquill Betrand; OT	Philadelphia, PA	Northeast High School	6 ft 6 in (1.98 m)	310 lb (140 kg)	Aug 6, 2022
Naquill Betrand; OT	Recruit ratings: Rivals: 247Sports: ESPN: (79)				
Colton Thomasson; OT	Spring Branch, TX	Smithson Valley High School	6 ft 8 in (2.03 m)	335 lb (152 kg)	Jul 31, 2021
Colton Thomasson; OT	Recruit ratings: Rivals: 247Sports: ESPN: (79)				
Chantz Johnson; OLB	College Station, TX	College Station High School	6 ft 1 in (1.85 m)	210 lb (95 kg)	Dec 21, 2022
Chantz Johnson; OLB	Recruit ratings: Rivals: 247Sports: ESPN: (78)				
Samu Taumanupepe; DT	Humble, TX	Atascocita High School	6 ft 3 in (1.91 m)	360 lb (160 kg)	Aug 1, 2022
Samu Taumanupepe; DT	Recruit ratings: Rivals: 247Sports: ESPN: (76)				
Taurean York; ILB	Temple, TX	Temple High School	6 ft 0 in (1.83 m)	220 lb (100 kg)	Dec 19, 2022
Taurean York; ILB	Recruit ratings: Rivals: 247Sports: ESPN: (76)				
Tyler White; K	Southlake, TX	Carroll Senior High School	6 ft 4 in (1.93 m)	200 lb (91 kg)	Apr 11, 2022
Tyler White; K	Recruit ratings: Rivals: 247Sports: ESPN: (75)				
Overall recruit ranking: Rivals: #14 247Sports: #10
Note: In many cases, Scout, Rivals, 247Sports, On3, and ESPN may conflict in their listings of height and weight.; In these cases, the average was taken. ESPN grades are on a 100-point scale.; Sources: "Rivals commits". Rivals.; "ESPN commits". ESPN.; "2023 Team Ranking". Rivals.com.; "247Sports commits". 247Sports.

=== Outgoing transfers ===
Name	Pos.	New school
Alan Guerrieri	P	Louisiana
Caden Davis	K	Ole Miss
Chase Lane	WR	Georgia Tech
Brian George	CB	Houston
Haynes King	QB	Georgia Tech
Elijah Jeudy	DL	Nebraska
Myles Jones	CB	Duke
Blake Smith	TE	Oklahoma
P. J. Williams	OT	SMU
Tunmise Abeleye	EDGE	Michigan State
Eli Stowers	QB	New Mexico State
LJ Johnson	RB	SMU
Josh Monten	CB	Marshall
Donell Harris	EDGE	LA-Monroe
Dallas Walker IV	DL	Western Kentucky
Marcus Burris	EDGE	Indiana
Ryan Campbell	WR	None
Tarian Lee Jr.	LB	Georgia Southern
Andre White Jr.	LB	Georgia Tech
Denver Harris	CB	LSU
Ish Harris	LB	Houston
Chris Marshall	WR	Ole Miss
Devin Price	WR	FAU
Deyon Bouie	CB	Georgia
Yulkeith Brown	WR	Tulane
Marquis Groves-Killebrew	CB	Louisville
Adarious Jones	DL	Memphis
Anthony Lucas	EDGE	USC
Matthew Wykoff	CB	Cal
Bobby Taylor	IOL	None
Grant Perry	EDGE	None
Tyrin Smith	WR	None

=== Incoming transfers ===
Name	Pos.	Previous school
Tony Grimes	CB	North Carolina
Sam McCall	S	Florida State
Aidan Siano	LB	Rice
Tyrin Smith	WR	UTEP
Preston Landis	RB	North Texas
Derek Ferraro	OT	Richmond
Jerry Johnson III	IOL	Rice
Josh DeBerry	CB	Boston College
Finn Dirstine	IOL	Boston College
Jurriente Davis	LB	Jackson State
Danny Lockhart	LB	Ole Miss
Jaylen Henderson	QB	Fresno State
David Bailey	RB	Colorado State
Jahdae Walker	WR	Grand Valley State
Jordan Anthony	WR	Kentucky

== Personnel ==
=== Roster ===
2023 Texas A&M Aggies Football Roster
Quarterbacks: 10 Marcel Reed – freshman (6'2, 190); 14 Max Johnson – junior (6'6, 230); 15 Conner Weigman – sophomore (6'2, 215); 16 Jaylen Henderson – sophomore (6'3, 220); Johnny Ryder – freshman (6'1, 195); 21 Dallas Novicke – freshman (6'0, 200); 23 Blake Bost – junior (6'3, 195); Running backs: 2 Rueben Owens – freshman (6'0, 200); 4 Amari Daniels – junior (5'9, 205); 8 Le'Veon Moss – sophomore (6'0, 210); 24 Earnest Crownover – senior (6'3, 230); 25 Anthony Dinota – (redshirt) sophomore (6'0, 205); 27 Ronnie Crosby – freshman (5'9, 215); 28 Israel Benjamin – senior (5'9, 210); 29 Joseph Mikulec – senior (5'9, 205); 32 Jerry Johnson – senior (6'1, 235); 33 Charles Shelling – (redshirt) junior (5'10, 210); 34 Preston Landis – sophomore (5'11, 210); 39 Sam Salz – junior (5'6, 155); Fullback: 48 Jacob Graham – (redshirt) junior (5'11, 220); Wide receivers: 0 Ainias Smith – (redshirt) senior (5'10, 200); 1 Evan Stewart – sophomore (6'0, 175); 3 Noah Thomas – sophomore (6'6, 200); 7 Moose Muhammad III – junior (6'1, 205); 9 Jahdae Walker – junior (6'4, 210); 11 Raymond Cottrell – freshman (6'3, 210); 13 Micah Tease – freshman (6,0, 180); 31 Andrew Maleski – (redshirt) freshman (5'10, 175); 80 Hunter Vivaldi – (redshirt) freshman (5'10, 165); 81 Pierce Turner – (redshirt) freshman (6'3, 195); 84 Blake Buntyn – freshman (6'2, 190); 85 Chase Burton – freshman (5'11, 175); 87 Jacob Brasher – freshman (6'1, 190); 88 Jordan Anthony – sophomore (5'10, 160); Tight ends: 6 Jaden Platt – freshman (6'5, 245); 17 Theo Melin Öhrström – sophomore (6'6, 250); 18 Donovan Green – sophomore (6'4, 245); 19 Jake Johnson – sophomore (6'6, 240); 42 Max Wright – (redshirt) senior (6'4, 260); 82 Fernando Garza – (redshirt) sophomore (6'6, 250); 89 Nathan Figueroa – (redshirt) freshman (6'4, 255); Long snappers: 48 Jacob Graham – (redshirt) junior (5'11, 220); 49 Connor Able – (redshirt) sophomore (6'3, 220); 58 Garrett Townsend – (redshirt) senior (6'0, 245); 51 Levi Hancock – (redshirt) freshman (6'2, 225)	Offensive linemen: 54 Mark Nabou – freshman (6'4, 325); 55 Hunter Erb – (redshirt) freshman (6'6, 320); 56 John Sabra – senior (6'2, 335); 59 Ty Banco – freshman (6'1, 295); 60 Trey Zuhn III – (redshirt) sophomore (6'7, 315); 61 Bryce Foster – (redshirt) sophomore (6'5, 325); 62 Zachary Clay – sophomore (5'11, 235); 63 Chance Jackson – (redshirt) freshman (6'0, 295); 64 Layden Robinson – (redshirt) senior (6'4, 315); 65 Rashad Daniel – freshman (6'5, 310); 66 Jordan Spasojevic-Moko – (redshirt) junior (6'6, 325); 67 TJ Shanahan – freshman (6'4, 315); 68 Remington Strickland – (redshirt) sophomore (6'4, 300); 70 Derek Ferraro – senior (6'6, 320); 71 Chase Bisontis – freshman (5'11, 235); 73 Finn Dirstine – senior (6'5, 330); 74 Aki Ogunbiyi – (redshirt) junior (6'4, 315); 75 Kam Dewberry – sophomore (6'4, 330); 76 Reuben Fatheree II – junior (6'8, 330); 77 Colton Thomasson – freshman (6'8, 320); 78 Dametrious Crownover – (redshirt) sophomore (6'7, 315); 79 James Bailey – (redshirt) freshman (6'3, 310); Defensive linemen: 0 Walter Nolen – sophomore (6'4, 290); 3 McKinnley Jackson – senior (6'2, 325); 4 Shemar Stewart – sophomore (6'6, 285); 5 Shemar Turner – junior (6'4, 300); 6 Enai White – sophomore (6'5, 240); 10 Fadil Diggs – junior (6'5, 260); 13 David Hicks – freshman (6'5, 290); 15 Rylan Kennedy – freshman (6'4, 220); 17 Albert Regis – (redshirt) sophomore (6'2, 325); 18 L. T. Overton – sophomore (6'5, 265); 34 Isaiah Raikes – junior (6'2, 325); 53 Jadon Scarlett – freshman (6'2, 285); 88 Samu Taumanupepe – freshman (6'3, 380); 90 Nana Boadi-Owusu – (redshirt) freshman (6'2, 240); 91 Tommy Colligan – freshman (6'2, 230); 92 Malick Sylla – sophomore (6'6, 240); 93 Drew Beltran – junior (6'1, 275); 94 Cody Polk – (redshirt) freshman (6'7, 240); 95 Michaiah Overton – senior (6'4, 300); 96 Nathan Jackson – (redshirt) sophomore (6'0, 275); 97 Alessandro Perez – freshman (6'3, 210); 99 Gabe Brownlow-Dindy – freshman (6'3, 300); Placekickers: 22 Ethan Moczulski – freshman (5'11, 200); 39 Blair Zepeda – senior (5'11, 220); 47 Randy Bond – junior (5'11, 195); 94 Drake Bhatia – (redshirt) junior (5'7, 165)	Linebackers: 21 Taurean York – freshman (6'0, 230); 22 Jurriente Davis – senior (6'1, 235); 23 Chantz Johnson – freshman (6'1, 225); 24 Chris Russell Jr. – senior (6'2, 235); 27 Daymion Sanford – freshman (6'2, 225); 29 Sam Mathews – senior (6'3, 210); 40 Martrell Harris Jr. – sophomore (6'2, 220); 41 Jalen Waddy – (redshirt) junior (6'0, 230); 45 Edgerrin Cooper – (redshirt) junior (6'3, 225); 47 Atoa Eskeets – freshman (6'0, 230); 50 Jaxson Slanker – (redshirt) freshman (6'0, 215); 51 Kason Tullos – (redshirt) sophomore (6'1, 220); 52 Andrew Merrick – (redshirt) junior (6'2, 220); 54 Danny Lockhart – junior (5'11, 230); Defensive backs: 1 Bryce Anderson – sophomore (6'0, 195); 2 Jacoby Mathews – sophomore (6'1, 215); 7 Tyreek Chappell – junior (5'11, 185); 8 Tony Grimes – senior (6'0, 190); 9 Bobby Taylor – freshman (6'1, 180); 11 Deuce Harmon – (redshirt) sophomore (5'10, 185); 14 Jayvon Thomas – freshman (6'0, 190); 16 Sam McCall – sophomore (6'1, 185); 19 Bravion Rogers – freshman (6'0, 180); 20 Jardin Gilbert – junior (6'1, 200); 25 Dalton Brooks – freshman (6'0, 195); 26 Demani Richardson – senior (6'1, 215); 28 Josh DeBerry – senior (6'1, 180); 29 Samuel Mathews – senior (6'3, 210); 30 JR Rosenberg – freshman (5'10, 210); 31 Caleb Surber – (redshirt) sophomore (6'0, 175); 32 Aaron Trevino – freshman (5'8, 180); 33 Jarred Kerr – sophomore (6'0, 195); 35 Isaiah Willis – freshman (6'0, 205); 36 Kyle Walsh – sophomore (6'0, 200); 37 Aidan Herrera – freshman (6'0, 200); 38 Will Smoot – senior (5'11, 190); 42 Kent Robinson – (redshirt) freshman (5'10, 175); 43 Alex Zettler – senior (6'0, 200); 52 Andrew Merrick – (redshirt) junior (6'2, 220); 87 Keith Steptoe – junior (6'0, 195); Punters: 36 Truette Tumey – sophomore (6'2, 185); 37 Tyler White – freshman (6'4, 215); 95 Nik Constantinou – senior (6'3, 225)

=== Coaching staff ===
Name	Position	Season at Texas A&M
Jimbo Fisher	Head coach, first 10 games	6th
Bobby Petrino	Offensive coordinator and quarterbacks coach	1st
James Coley	Co-offensive coordinator and tight ends coach	4th
Marquel Blackwell	Running backs coach	1st
Dameyune Craig	Wide receivers coach	6th
Steve Addazio	Offensive line coach	2nd
D. J. Durkin	Defensive coordinator and linebackers coach	2nd
Elijah Robinson	Assistant head coach, interim head coach (remainder of season), co-defensive coordinator, and defensive line coach	6th
Bryant Gross-Armiento	Secondary coach	1st
T. J. Rushing	Defensive backs coach	4th
Joe Shaefer	Defensive assistant	2nd
Brandon Sanders	Strength and conditioning coach	6th

== Schedule ==
Texas A&M and the SEC announced the 2023 football schedule on September 20, 2022. The 2023 Aggies' schedule consists of 7 home games, 4 away games, and 1 neutral site game for the regular season. Texas A&M will host four SEC conference opponents Alabama, Auburn, Mississippi State and South Carolina at home and will travel to four SEC opponents, LSU (rivalry), Ole Miss, and Tennessee and will face Arkansas (rivalry) at AT&T Stadium in Arlington, Texas to close out the SEC regular season on the road. Texas A&M is not scheduled to play SEC East opponents Florida, Georgia, Kentucky, Missouri and Vanderbilt in the 2023 regular season. The Aggies' bye week comes during week 8 (on October 21, 2023).

The Aggies will host three non–conference games which are against Abilene Christian from the WAC (FCS), Louisiana–Monroe from the Sun Belt and New Mexico from the Mountain West and will travel to Miami (FL) from the ACC.

Date	Time	Opponent	Rank	Site	TV	Result	Attendance
September 2	6:00 p.m.	New Mexico*	No. 23	Kyle Field; College Station, TX	ESPN	W 52–10	97,560
September 9	2:30 p.m.	at Miami (FL)*	No. 23	Hard Rock Stadium; Miami Gardens, FL	ABC	L 33–48	48,792
September 16	3:00 p.m.	Louisiana–Monroe*		Kyle Field; College Station, TX	SECN	W 47–3	93,090
September 23	11:00 a.m.	Auburn		Kyle Field; College Station, TX (SEC Nation)	ESPN	W 27–10	102,530
September 30	11:00 a.m.	vs. Arkansas		AT&T Stadium; Arlington, TX (rivalry)	SECN	W 34–22	59,437
October 7	2:30 p.m.	No. 11 Alabama		Kyle Field; College Station, TX	CBS	L 20–26	108,101
October 14	2:30 p.m.	at No. 19 Tennessee		Neyland Stadium; Knoxville, TN (SEC Nation)	CBS	L 13–20	101,915
October 28	11:00 a.m.	South Carolina		Kyle Field; College Station, TX	ESPN	W 30–17	95,297
November 4	11:00 a.m.	at No. 10 Ole Miss		Vaught–Hemingway Stadium; Oxford, MS (SEC Nation)	ESPN	L 35–38	65,680
November 11	6:30 p.m.	Mississippi State		Kyle Field; College Station, TX	ESPN2	W 51–10	103,266
November 18	11:00 a.m.	Abilene Christian*		Kyle Field; College Station, TX	SECN+/ESPN+	W 38–10	94,794
November 25	11:00 a.m.	at No. 14 LSU		Tiger Stadium; Baton Rouge, LA (rivalry)	ESPN	L 30–42	101,178
December 27	8:00 p.m.	vs. No. 20 Oklahoma State*		NRG Stadium; Houston, TX (Texas Bowl)	ESPN	L 23–31	55,212
*Non-conference game; Rankings from AP Poll (and CFP Rankings, after October 31) – Released prior to game; All times are in Central time

== Game summaries ==
=== New Mexico ===
New Mexico Lobos at No. 23 Texas A&M Aggies – Game summary

Quarter	1	2	3	4	Total
Lobos	0	7	3	0	10
No. 23 Aggies	7	28	7	10	52

at Kyle Field, College Station, Texas

- Date: September 2
- Game time: 6:00 p.m. CDT
- Game weather: Sunny, 99 °F (37 °C)
- Game attendance: 97,560
- Referee: David Smith
- TV announcers (ESPN): Mark Jones, Louis Riddick, and Quint Kessenich
- Box score, Recap

Game information
First quarter
- TAMU – Noah Thomas 15-yard pass from Conner Weigman (Randy Bond kick), 5:00. Aggies 7–0. Drive: 7 plays, 85 yards, 3:10.

Second quarter

- TAMU – Evan Stewart 35-yard pass from Conner Weigman (Randy Bond kick), 14:53. Aggies 14–0. Drive: 5 plays, 45 yards, 1:37.
- UNM – Jacory Croskey-Merritt 27-yard run (Luke Drzewiecki kick), 10:32. Aggies 14–7. Drive: 6 plays, 88 yards, 4:21.
- TAMU – Noah Thomas 34-yard pass from Conner Weigman (Randy Bond kick), 8:03. Aggies 21–7. Drive: 6 plays, 67 yards, 2:29.
- TAMU – Le'Veon Moss 2-yard run (Randy Bond kick), 5:30. Aggies 28–7. Drive: 5 plays, 38 yards, 2:02.
- TAMU – Noah Thomas 9-yard pass from Conner Weigman (Randy Bond kick), 1:27. Aggies 35–7. Drive: 5 plays, 37 yards, 2:00.

Third quarter

- UNM – Luke Drzewiecki 27-yard field goal, 6:09. Aggies 35–10. Drive: 12 plays, 51 yards, 7:09.
- TAMU – Evan Stewart 8-yard pass from Conner Weigman (Randy Bond kick), 2:30. Aggies 42–10. Drive: 9 plays, 70 yards, 3:39.

Fourth quarter

- TAMU – Moose Muhammad III 12-yard pass from Max Johnson (Randy Bond kick), 7:35. Aggies 49–10. Drive: 6 plays, 55 yards, 3:37.
- TAMU – Randy Bond 39-yard field goal, 1:10. Aggies 52–10. Drive: 9 plays, 40 yards, 3:32.

Statistics	UNM	TAMU
First downs	18	27
Total yards	222	411
Rushing yards	91	134
Passing yards	131	277
Turnovers	1	0
Time of possession	34:20	25:40

Team	Category	Player	Statistics
New Mexico	Passing	Dylan Hopkins	15/24, 115 yards, INT
New Mexico	Rushing	Jacory Croskey-Merritt	11 rushes, 50 yards, TD
New Mexico	Receiving	Jeremiah Hixon	6 receptions, 42 yards
Texas A&M	Passing	Conner Weigman	18/23, 236 yards, 5 TD
Texas A&M	Rushing	Amari Daniels	7 rushes, 51 yards
Texas A&M	Receiving	Evan Stewart	8 receptions, 115 yards, 2 TD

=== at Miami (FL) ===
No. 23 Texas A&M Aggies at Miami Hurricanes – Game summary

Quarter	1	2	3	4	Total
No. 23 Aggies	10	7	9	7	33
Hurricanes	7	14	10	17	48

at Hard Rock Stadium, Miami Gardens, Florida

- Date: September 9
- Game time: 2:30 p.m. CDT/3:30 p.m. EDT
- Game weather: Cloudy, 80 °F (27 °C)
- Game attendance: 48,792
- Referee: Jason Autrey
- TV announcers (ABC): Joe Tessitore, Jesse Palmer, and Katie George
- Box score, Recap

Game information
First quarter
- TAMU – Conner Weigman 1-yard run (Randy Bond kick), 12:30. Aggies 7–0. Drive: 3 plays, 15 yards, 0:57.
- TAMU – Randy Bond 24-yard field goal, 5:25. Aggies 10–0. Drive: 11 plays, 76 yards, 5:04.
- MIA – Colbie Young 3-yard pass from Tyler Van Dyke (Andres Borregales kick), 2:08. Aggies 10–7. Drive: 7 plays, 75 yards, 3:17.

Second quarter

- TAMU – Amari Daniels 9-yard run (Randy Bond kick), 13:11. Aggies 17–7. Drive: 2 plays, 9 yards, 0:09.
- MIA – Isaiah Horton 52-yard pass from Tyler Van Dyke (Andres Borregales kick), 11:06. Aggies 17–14. Drive: 5 plays, 75 yards, 2:05.
- MIA – Jacolby George 11-yard pass from Tyler Van Dyke (Andres Borregales kick), 0:13. Hurricanes 21–17. Drive: 6 plays, 75 yards, 0:44.

Third quarter

- TAMU – Randy Bond 28-yard field goal, 9:07. Hurricanes 21–20. Drive: 12 plays, 59 yards, 5:53.
- MIA – Brashard Smith 98-yard kickoff return (Andres Borregales kick), 8:55. Hurricanes 28–20.
- MIA – Andres Borregales 34-yard field goal, 5:39. Hurricanes 31–20. Drive: 4 plays, 6 yards, 1:25.
- TAMU – Earnest Crownover 19-yard pass from Conner Weigman (pass failed), 2:29. Hurricanes 31–26. Drive: 7 plays, 75 yards, 3:10.

Fourth quarter

- MIA – Jacolby George 3-yard pass from Tyler Van Dyke (Andres Borregales kick), 12:37. Hurricanes 38–26. Drive: 5 plays, 31 yards, 2:23.
- MIA – Andres Borregales 50-yard field goal, 6:28. Hurricanes 41–26. Drive: 7 plays, 46 yards, 4:40.
- TAMU – Noah Thomas 9-yard pass from Conner Weigman (Randy Bond kick), 5:02. Hurricanes 41–33. Drive: 6 plays, 74 yards, 1:26.
- MIA – Jacolby George 64-yard pass from Tyler Van Dyke (Andres Borregales kick), 2:37. Hurricanes 48–33. Drive: 4 plays, 80 yards, 2:25.

Statistics	TAMU	MIA
First downs	25	16
Total yards	433	451
Rushing yards	97	277
Passing yards	336	374
Turnovers	3	1
Time of possession	32:17	27:43

Team	Category	Player	Statistics
Texas A&M	Passing	Conner Weigman	31/53, 336 yards, 2 TD, 2 INT
Texas A&M	Rushing	Amari Daniels	18 rushes, 62 yards, TD
Texas A&M	Receiving	Evan Stewart	11 receptions, 142 yards
Miami	Passing	Tyler Van Dyke	21/30, 374 yards, 5 TD
Miami	Rushing	Henry Parrish Jr.	10 rushes, 50 yards
Miami	Receiving	Xavier Restrepo	6 receptions, 126 yards

=== Louisiana–Monroe ===
Louisiana–Monroe Warhawks at Texas A&M Aggies – Game summary

Quarter	1	2	3	4	Total
Warhawks	0	3	0	0	3
Aggies	10	17	10	10	47

at Kyle Field, College Station, Texas

- Date: September 16
- Game time: 3:00 p.m. CDT
- Game weather: Sunny, 76 °F (24 °C)
- Game attendance: 93,090
- Referee: Steve Marlowe
- TV announcers (SECN): Dave Neal, Derek Mason, and Taylor Davis
- Box score, Recap

Game information
First quarter
- TAMU – Randy Bond 30-yard field goal, 8:30. Aggies 3–0. Drive: 11 plays, 65 yards, 5:00.
- TAMU – Jahdae Walker 12-yard pass from Conner Weigman (Randy Bond kick), 2:26. Aggies 10–0. Drive: 8 plays, 90 yards, 3:38.

Second quarter

- ULM – Derek McCormick 24-yard field goal, 13:19. Aggies 10–3. Drive: 9 plays, 69 yards, 4:07.
- TAMU – Conner Weigman 19-yard run (Randy Bond kick), 9:37. Aggies 17–3. Drive: 8 plays, 74 yards, 3:32.
- TAMU – Randy Bond 23-yard field goal, 4:04. Aggies 20–3. Drive: 9 plays, 67 yards, 3:28.
- TAMU – Amari Daniels 4-yard run (Randy Bond kick), 0:48. Aggies 27–3. Drive: 6 plays, 63 yards, 1:12.

Third quarter

- TAMU – Randy Bond 34-yard field goal, 11:00. Aggies 30–3. Drive: 8 plays, 32 yards, 3:54.
- TAMU – Rueben Owens 21-yard run (Randy Bond kick), 5:54. Aggies 37–3. Drive: 7 plays, 60 yards, 3:31.

Fourth quarter

- TAMU – Raymond Cottrell 13-yard pass from Max Johnson (Randy Bond kick), 11:15. Aggies 44–3. Drive: 7 plays, 41 yards, 2:54.
- TAMU – Randy Bond 52-yard field goal, 7:11. Aggies 47–3. Drive: 6 plays, 19 yards, 2:34.

Statistics	ULM	TAMU
First downs	8	28
Total yards	222	451
Rushing yards	127	158
Passing yards	95	399
Turnovers	0	0
Time of possession	25:31	34:29

Team	Category	Player	Statistics
Louisiana–Monroe	Passing	Jiya Wright	6/15, 95 yards
Louisiana–Monroe	Rushing	Jiya Wright	5 carries, 34 yards
Louisiana–Monroe	Receiving	Dariyan Wiley	3 receptions, 52 yards
Texas A&M	Passing	Conner Weigman	25/29, 337 yards, TD
Texas A&M	Rushing	Rueben Owens	8 carries, 51 yards, TD
Texas A&M	Receiving	Ainias Smith	7 receptions, 127 yards

=== Auburn ===
Auburn Tigers at Texas A&M Aggies – Game summary

Quarter	1	2	3	4	Total
Tigers	0	3	0	7	10
Aggies	6	0	14	7	27

at Kyle Field, College Station, Texas

- Date: September 23
- Game time: 11:00 a.m. CDT
- Game weather: Sunny, 86 °F (30 °C)
- Game attendance: 102,530
- Referee: Kyle Olson
- TV announcers (ESPN): Bob Wischusen, Robert Griffin III, and Kris Budden
- Box score, Recap

Game information
First quarter
- TAMU – Randy Bond 51-yard field goal, 9:23. Aggies 3–0. Drive: 12 plays, 41 yards, 5:37.
- TAMU – Randy Bond 32-yard field goal, 5:32. Aggies 6–0. Drive: 7 plays, 43 yards, 2:18.

Second quarter

- AUB – Alex McPherson 53-yard field goal, 0:05. Aggies 6–3. Drive: 8 plays, 8 yards, 4:28.

Third quarter

- TAMU – Jake Johnson 22-yard pass from Max Johnson (Randy Bond kick), 9:42. Aggies 13–3. Drive: 6 plays, 46 yards, 3:16.
- TAMU – Evan Stewart 37-yard pass from Max Johnson (Randy Bond kick), 6:22. Aggies 20–3. Drive: 5 plays, 65 yards, 2:15.

Fourth quarter

- AUB – Eugene Asante 67-yard fumble return (Alex McPherson kick), 12:16. Aggies 20–10.
- TAMU – Le'Veon Moss 4-yard run (Randy Bond kick), 3:59. Aggies 27–10. Drive: 3 plays, 86 yards, 1:04.

Statistics	AUB	TAMU
First downs	14	16
Total yards	200	402
Rushing yards	144	209
Passing yards	56	193
Turnovers	0	1
Time of possession	32:10	27:50

Team	Category	Player	Statistics
Auburn	Passing	Payton Thorne	6/12, 44 yards
Auburn	Rushing	Brian Battie	8 carries, 59 yards
Auburn	Receiving	Brian Battie	2 receptions, 23 yards
Texas A&M	Passing	Max Johnson	7/11, 123 yards, 2 TD
Texas A&M	Rushing	Le'Veon Moss	15 carries, 97 yards, TD
Texas A&M	Receiving	Ainias Smith	5 receptions, 78 yards

=== Vs. Arkansas ===
Texas A&M Aggies vs. Arkansas Razorbacks – Game summary

Quarter	1	2	3	4	Total
Aggies	7	10	10	7	34
Razorbacks	3	3	10	6	22

at AT&T Stadium, Arlington, Texas

- Date: September 30
- Game time: 11:00 a.m. CDT
- Game weather: None (retractable roof closed)
- Game attendance: 59,437
- Referee: Lee Hedrick
- TV announcers (SECN): Dave Neal, Matt Stinchcomb, and Alyssa Lang
- Box score, Recap

Game information
First quarter
- ARK – Cam Little 52-yard field goal, 6:45. Razorbacks 3–0. Drive: 15 plays, 42 yards, 8:15.
- TAMU – Evan Stewart 32-yard pass from Max Johnson (Randy Bond kick), 2:36. Aggies 7–3. Drive: 8 plays, 75 yards, 4:09.

Second quarter

- ARK – Cam Little 25-yard field goal, 13:00. Aggies 7–6. Drive: 10 plays, 69 yards, 4:30.
- TAMU – Randy Bond 42-yard field goal, 10:26. Aggies 10–6. Drive: 8 plays, 51 yards, 2:34.
- TAMU – Earnest Crownover 2-yard pass from Max Johnson (Randy Bond kick), 0:13. Aggies 17–6. Drive: 8 plays, 39 yards, 2:36.

Third quarter

- ARK – Lorando Johnson 20-yard interception return (Cam Little kick), 14:54. Aggies 17–13.
- TAMU – Randy Bond 34-yard field goal, 11:11. Aggies 20–13. Drive: 8 plays, 58 yards, 3:43.
- ARK – Cam Little 50-yard field goal, 7:58. Aggies 20–16. Drive: 4 plays, 3 yards, 0:44.
- TAMU – Chris Russell Jr. 16-yard interception return (Randy Bond kick), 5:15. Aggies 27–16.

Fourth quarter

- TAMU – Ainias Smith 82-yard punt return (Randy Bond kick), 7:40. Aggies 34–16.
- ARK – Andrew Armstrong 48-yard pass from KJ Jefferson (pass failed), 3:53. Aggies 34–22. Drive: 4 plays, 64 yards, 1:05.

Statistics	TAMU	ARK
First downs	19	10
Total yards	414	174
Rushing yards	204	42
Passing yards	210	132
Turnovers	3	1
Time of possession	30:33	29:27

Team	Category	Player	Statistics
Texas A&M	Passing	Max Johnson	17/28, 210 yards, 2 TD, INT
Texas A&M	Rushing	Le'Veon Moss	17 rushes, 107 yards
Texas A&M	Receiving	Ainias Smith	4 receptions, 71 yards
Arkansas	Passing	KJ Jefferson	9/17, 132 yards, TD, INT
Arkansas	Rushing	Raheim Sanders	11 rushes, 34 yards
Arkansas	Receiving	Andrew Armstrong	3 receptions, 78 yards, TD

=== No. 11 Alabama ===
No. 11 Alabama Crimson Tide at Texas A&M Aggies – Game summary

Quarter	1	2	3	4	Total
No. 11 Crimson Tide	3	7	14	2	26
Aggies	3	14	0	3	20

at Kyle Field, College Station, Texas

- Date: October 7
- Game time: 2:30 p.m. CDT
- Game weather: Sunny, 74 °F (23 °C)
- Game attendance: 108,101
- Referee: Daniel Gautreaux
- TV announcers (CBS): Brad Nessler, Gary Danielson, and Jenny Dell
- Box score, Recap

Game information
- TAMU – Randy Bond 22-yard field goal, 5:34. Aggies 3–0. Drive: 7 plays, 39 yards, 3:15.
- ALA – Will Reichard 39-yard field goal, 3:31. Tied 3–3. Drive: 6 plays, 49 yards, 1:56.

Second quarter

- ALA – Isaiah Bond 52-yard pass from Jalen Milroe (Will Reichard kick), 14:51. Crimson Tide 10–3. Drive: 5 plays, 66 yards, 2:06.
- TAMU – Jake Johnson 22-yard pass from Max Johnson (Randy Bond kick), 9:57. Tied 10–10. Drive: 1 play, 22 yards, 0:08.
- TAMU – Le'Veon Moss 1-yard run (Randy Bond kick), 3:23. Aggies 17–10. Drive: 11 plays, 53 yards, 5:38.

Third quarter

- ALA – Jermaine Burton 15-yard pass from Jalen Milroe (Will Reichard kick), 7:29. Tied 17–17. Drive: 6 plays, 39 yards, 2:57.
- ALA – Jermaine Burton 19-yard pass from Jalen Milroe (Will Reichard kick), 0:22. Crimson Tide 24–17. Drive: 6 plays, 80 yards, 2:37.

Fourth quarter

- ALA – Max Johnson intentional grounding in end zone, 5:55. Crimson Tide 26–17.
- TAMU – Randy Bond 20-yard field goal, 2:11. Crimson Tide 26–20. Drive: 5 plays, 62 yards, 1:26.

Statistics	ALA	TAMU
First downs	16	16
Total yards	344	306
Rushing yards	23	67
Passing yards	321	239
Turnovers	2	1
Time of possession	29:09	30:51

Team	Category	Player	Statistics
Alabama	Passing	Jalen Milroe	21/33, 321 yards, 3 TD, INT
Alabama	Rushing	Jase McClellan	12 rushes, 45 yards
Alabama	Receiving	Jermaine Burton	9 receptions, 197 yards, 2 TD
Texas A&M	Passing	Max Johnson	14/25, 239 yards, TD, INT
Texas A&M	Rushing	Le'Veon Moss	16 rushes, 49 yards, TD
Texas A&M	Receiving	Ainias Smith	4 receptions, 88 yards

=== at No. 19 Tennessee ===
Texas A&M Aggies at No. 19 Tennessee Volunteers – Game summary

Quarter	1	2	3	4	Total
Aggies	7	3	3	0	13
No. 19 Volunteers	7	0	7	6	20

at Neyland Stadium, Knoxville, Tennessee

- Date: October 14
- Game time: 2:30 p.m. CDT/3:30 p.m. EDT
- Game weather: Cloudy, 73 °F (23 °C)
- Game attendance: 101,915
- Referee: Matt Loeffler
- TV announcers (CBS): Brad Nessler, Gary Danielson, and Jenny Dell
- Box score, Recap

Game information
First quarter
- TAMU – Max Johnson 2-yard run (Randy Bond kick), 8:29. Aggies 7–0. Drive: 9 plays, 80 yards, 4:15.
- TENN – Jacob Warren 7-yard pass from Joe Milton (Charles Campbell kick), 1:44. Tied 7–7. Drive: 7 plays, 51 yards, 2:10.

Second quarter

- TAMU – Randy Bond 41-yard field goal, 10:48. Aggies 10–7. Drive: 11 plays, 51 yards, 5:56.

Third quarter

- TENN – Dee Williams 39-yard punt return (Charles Campbell kick), 6:47. Volunteers 14–10.
- TAMU – Randy Bond 24-yard field goal, 3:15. Volunteers 14–13. Drive: 8 plays, 68 yards, 3:32.

Fourth quarter

- TENN – Charles Campbell 31-yard field goal, 3:48. Volunteers 17–13. Drive: 11 plays, 53 yards, 4:46.
- TENN – Charles Campbell 24-yard field goal, 2:31. Volunteers 20–13. Drive: 4 plays, 0 yards, 0:54.

Statistics	TAMU	TENN
First downs	17	20
Total yards	277	332
Rushing yards	54	232
Passing yards	223	100
Turnovers	2	1
Time of possession	30:48	29:12

Team	Category	Player	Statistics
Texas A&M	Passing	Max Johnson	16/34, 223 yards, 2 INT
Texas A&M	Rushing	Le'Veon Moss	15 rushes, 62 yards
Texas A&M	Receiving	Noah Thomas	3 receptions, 75 yards
Tennessee	Passing	Joe Milton	11/22, 100 yards, TD, INT
Tennessee	Rushing	Jaylen Wright	19 rushes, 136 yards
Tennessee	Receiving	Chas Nimrod	4 receptions, 31 yards

=== South Carolina ===
South Carolina Gamecocks at Texas A&M Aggies – Game summary

Quarter	1	2	3	4	Total
Gamecocks	7	0	3	7	17
Aggies	0	21	3	6	30

at Kyle Field, College Station, Texas

- Date: October 28
- Game time: 11:00 a.m. CDT
- Game weather: Cloudy, 81 °F (27 °C)
- Game attendance: 95,297
- Referee: Scott Walker
- TV announcers (ESPN): Mark Jones, Louis Riddick, and Quint Kessenich
- Box score, Recap

Game information
First quarter
- SC – Dakereon Joyner 1-yard run (Mitch Jeter kick), 2:04. Gamecocks 7–0. Drive: 13 plays, 65 yards, 6:41.

Second quarter

- TAMU – Rueben Owens 14-yard run (Randy Bond kick), 9:00. Tied 7–7. Drive: 6 plays, 55 yards, 3:03.
- TAMU – Amari Daniels 1-yard run (Randy Bond kick), 1:44. Aggies 14–7. Drive: 10 plays, 48 yards, 6:19.
- TAMU – Ainias Smith 42-yard pass from Max Johnson (Randy Bond kick), 0:52. Aggies 21–7. Drive: 1 play, 42 yards, 0:13.

Third quarter

- SC – Mitch Jeter 49-yard field goal, 10:58. Aggies 21–10. Drive: 10 plays, 43 yards, 4:02.
- TAMU – Randy Bond 26-yard field goal, 2:46. Aggies 24–10. Drive: 13 plays, 75 yards, 6:26.

Fourth quarter

- SC – Joshua Simon 2-yard pass from Spencer Rattler (Mitch Jeter kick), 14:56. Aggies 24–17. Drive: 7 plays, 77 yards, 2:50.
- TAMU – Randy Bond 24-yard field goal, 11:00. Aggies 27–17. Drive: 8 plays, 69 yards, 3:56.
- TAMU – Randy Bond 52-yard field goal, 7:39. Aggies 30–17. Drive: 4 plays, −2 yards, 2:04.

Statistics	SC	TAMU
First downs	12	19
Total yards	209	354
Rushing yards	33	105
Passing yards	176	249
Turnovers	1	0
Time of possession	23:30	36:30

Team	Category	Player	Statistics
South Carolina	Passing	Spencer Rattler	20/33, 176 yards, TD
South Carolina	Rushing	Mario Anderson	16 rushes, 72 yards
South Carolina	Receiving	Nyck Harbor	6 receptions, 59 yards
Texas A&M	Passing	Max Johnson	20/30, 249 yards, TD
Texas A&M	Rushing	Amari Daniels	13 rushes, 68 yards, TD
Texas A&M	Receiving	Ainias Smith	6 receptions, 118 yards, TD

=== At No. 10 Ole Miss ===
Texas A&M Aggies at No. 10 Ole Miss Rebels – Game summary

Quarter	1	2	3	4	Total
Aggies	0	14	7	14	35
No. 10 Rebels	7	13	11	7	38

at Vaught-Hemingway Stadium, Oxford, Mississippi

- Date: November 4
- Game time: 11:00 a.m. CDT
- Game weather: Sunny, 65 °F (18 °C)
- Game attendance: 65,680
- Referee: David Smith
- TV announcers (ESPN): Joe Tessitore, Jordan Rodgers, and Katie George
- Box score, Recap

Game information
First quarter
- MISS – Quinshon Judkins 9-yard run (Caden Davis kick), 7:45. Rebels 7–0. Drive: 11 plays, 81 yards, 3:02.

Second quarter

- MISS – Tre Harris 11-yard pass from Jaxson Dart (Caden Davis kick), 12:53. Rebels 14–0. Drive: 8 plays, 94 yards, 2:39.
- TAMU – Jacoby Matthews 75-yard blocked field goal return (Randy Bond kick), 8:12. Rebels 14–7.
- MISS – Jordan Watkins 29-yard pass from Jaxson Dart (pass failed), 6:53. Rebels 20–7. Drive: 4 plays, 66 yards, 1:19.
- TAMU – Le'Veon Moss 13-yard run (Randy Bond kick), 1:44. Rebels 20–14. Drive: 12 plays, 75 yards, 5:09.

Third quarter

- MISS – Quinshon Judkins 6-yard run (Jaxson Dart pass to Tre Harris), 7:04. Rebels 28–14. Drive: 5 plays, 80 yards, 1:13.
- TAMU – Jake Johnson 28-yard pass from Max Johnson (Randy Bond kick), 5:05. Rebels 28–21. Drive: 5 plays, 75 yards, 1:59.
- MISS – Caden Davis 22-yard field goal, 0:46. Rebels 31–21. Drive: 13 plays, 71 yards, 4:19.

Fourth quarter

- TAMU – Amari Daniels 1-yard run (Randy Bond kick), 12:04. Rebels 31–28. Drive: 9 plays, 75 yards, 3:42.
- TAMU – Max Johnson 1-yard run (Randy Bond kick), 4:34. Aggies 35–31. Drive: 12 plays, 67 yards, 6:24.
- MISS – Quinshon Judkins 1-yard run (Caden Davis kick), 1:40. Rebels 38–35. Drive: 9 plays, 75 yards, 2:54.

Statistics	TAMU	MISS
First downs	30	26
Total yards	457	518
Rushing yards	152	131
Passing yards	305	387
Turnovers	1	0
Time of possession	35:37	24:23

Team	Category	Player	Statistics
Texas A&M	Passing	Max Johnson	31/42, 305 yards, TD, INT
Texas A&M	Rushing	Amari Daniels	12 rushes, 70 yards, TD
Texas A&M	Receiving	Jahdae Walker	8 receptions, 100 yards
Ole Miss	Passing	Jaxson Dart	24/33, 387 yards, 2 TD
Ole Miss	Rushing	Quinshon Judkins	23 rushes, 102 yards, 3 TD
Ole Miss	Receiving	Tre Harris	11 receptions, 213 yards, TD

=== Mississippi State ===
Mississippi State Bulldogs at Texas A&M Aggies – Game summary

Quarter	1	2	3	4	Total
Bulldogs	7	3	0	0	10
Aggies	17	17	14	3	51

at Kyle Field, College Station, Texas

- Date: November 11
- Game time: 6:30 p.m. CST
- Game weather: Cloudy, 57 °F (14 °C)
- Game attendance: 103,266
- Referee: Kyle Olson
- TV announcers (ESPN2): Brian Custer, Rod Gilmore, and Lauren Sisler
- Box score, Recap

Game information
First quarter
- MSST – Zavion Thomas 94-yard kickoff return (Kyle Ferrie kick), 14:48. Bulldogs 7–0.
- TAMU – Jaylen Henderson 22-yard run (Randy Bond kick), 11:47. Tied 7–7. Drive: 6 plays, 80 yards, 2:57.
- TAMU – Amari Daniels 1-yard run (Randy Bond kick), 2:23. Aggies 14–7. Drive: 5 plays, 31 yards, 2:10.
- TAMU – Randy Bond 33-yard field goal, 0:00. Aggies 17–7. Drive: 4 plays, −1 yards, 1:55.

Second quarter

- TAMU – Randy Bond 52-yard field goal, 12:40. Aggies 20–7. Drive: 4 plays, 0 yards, 0:20.
- MSST – Kyle Ferrie 35-yard field goal, 6:55. Aggies 20–10. Drive: 10 plays, 57 yards, 5:45.
- TAMU – Ainias Smith 19-yard pass from Jaylen Henderson (Randy Bond kick), 4:58. Aggies 27–10. Drive: 6 plays, 72 yards, 1:55.
- TAMU – Jaylen Henderson 11-yard run (Randy Bond kick), 1:20. Aggies 34–10. Drive: 8 plays, 60 yards, 2:23.

Third quarter

- TAMU – Shemar Stewart 43-yard fumble return (Randy Bond kick), 11:10. Aggies 41–10.
- TAMU – Jahdae Walker 11-yard pass from Jaylen Henderson (Randy Bond kick), 2:00. Aggies 48–10. Drive: 10 plays, 80 yards, 5:12.

Fourth quarter

- TAMU – Randy Bond 45-yard field goal, 8:44. Aggies 51–10. Drive: 8 plays, 42 yards, 3:12.

Statistics	MSST	TAMU
First downs	12	24
Total yards	237	396
Rushing yards	133	246
Passing yards	104	150
Turnovers	4	0
Time of possession	29:24	30:36

Team	Category	Player	Statistics
Mississippi State	Passing	Mike Wright	5/9, 68 yards
Mississippi State	Rushing	Seth Davis	12 rushes, 79 yards
Mississippi State	Receiving	Zavion Thomas	4 receptions, 39 yards
Texas A&M	Passing	Jaylen Henderson	11/19, 150 yards, 2 TD
Texas A&M	Rushing	Jaylen Henderson	12 rushes, 60 yards, 2 TD
Texas A&M	Receiving	Ainias Smith	4 receptions, 64 yards, TD

=== Abilene Christian ===
Abilene Christian Wildcats at Texas A&M Aggies – Game summary

Quarter	1	2	3	4	Total
Wildcats	7	0	0	3	10
Aggies	7	10	7	14	38

at Kyle Field, College Station, Texas

- Date: November 18
- Game time: 11:00 a.m. CST
- Game weather: Cloudy • Temperature: 67 °F (19 °C) • Wind: NE 8 miles per hour (13 km/h)
- Game attendance: 94,794
- Referee: Steve Marlowe
- TV announcers (SECN+/ESPN+): Courtney Lyle, Hutson Mason, and Ashley Stroehlein
- Box score, Recap

Game information

First quarter

- ACU – Cirby Coheley 51-yard interception (Grant Nickel kick), 13:04. Wildcats 7–0.
- TAMU – Rueben Owens 7-yard run (Randy Bond kick), 10:20. Tied 7–7. Drive: 6 plays, 75 yards, 2:44.

Second quarter

- TAMU – Randy Bond 34-yard field goal, 7:59. Aggies 10–7. Drive: 6 plays, 33 yards, 2:04.
- TAMU – Noah Thomas 13-yard pass from Jaylen Henderson (Randy Bond kick), 3:26. Aggies 17–7. Drive: 10 plays, 75 yards, 3:37.

Third quarter

- TAMU – Moose Muhammad III 49-yard pass from Jaylen Henderson (Randy Bond kick), 12:39. Aggies 24–7. Drive: 6 plays, 74 yards, 2:14.

Fourth quarter

- ACU – Kyle Ramsey 40-yard field goal, 14:06. Aggies 24–10. Drive: 13 plays, 67 yards, 7:02.
- TAMU – David Bailey 3-yard run (Randy Bond kick), 5:25. Aggies 31–10. Drive: 12 plays, 73 yards, 5:35.
- TAMU – Jaden Platt 13-yard pass from Marcel Reed (Randy Bond kick), 0:56. Aggies 38–10. Drive: 4 plays, 63 yards, 1:33.

Statistics	ACU	TAMU
First downs	12	25
Total yards	242	448
Rushing yards	93	175
Passing yards	149	273
Turnovers	0	1
Time of possession	30:46	29:14

Team	Category	Player	Statistics
Abilene Christian	Passing	Maverick McIvor	19/34, 149 yards
Abilene Christian	Rushing	Jay'Veon Sunday	18 rushes, 87 yards
Abilene Christian	Receiving	Blayne Taylor	7 receptions, 77 yards
Texas A&M	Passing	Jaylen Henderson	16/23, 260 yards, 2 TD, 1 INT
Texas A&M	Rushing	Rueben Owens	18 rushes, 106 yards
Texas A&M	Receiving	Moose Muhammad III	4 receptions, 104 yards, 1 TD

=== at No. 14 LSU ===
Texas A&M Aggies at No. 14 LSU Tigers – Game summary

Quarter	1	2	3	4	Total
Aggies	0	17	7	6	30
No. 14 Tigers	7	7	7	21	42

at Tiger Stadium, Baton Rouge, Louisiana

- Date: November 25
- Game time: 11:00 a.m. CST
- Game weather: Cloudy, 62 °F (17 °C)
- Game attendance: 101,178
- Referee: Matt Loeffler
- TV announcers (ESPN): Bob Wischusen, Robert Griffin III, and Kris Budden
- Box score, Recap

Game information
First quarter
- LSU – Logan Diggs 1-yard run (Damian Ramos kick), 7:52. Tigers 7–0. Drive: 9 plays, 60 yards, 4:04.

Second quarter

- TAMU – Le'Veon Moss 2-yard run (Randy Bond kick), 13:43. Tied 7–7. Drive: 17 plays, 67 yards, 9:02.
- TAMU – Randy Bond 48-yard field goal, 8:17. Aggies 10–7. Drive: 9 plays, 35 yards, 4:05.
- LSU – Malik Nabers 6-yard pass from Jayden Daniels (Damian Ramos kick), 5:04. Tigers 14–10. Drive: 7 plays, 65 yards, 3:13.
- TAMU – Jake Johnson 14-yard pass from Jaylen Henderson (Randy Bond kick), 0:14. Aggies 17–14. Drive: 13 plays, 78 yards, 4:45.

Third quarter

- TAMU – Mark Nabou Jr. 1-yard run (Randy Bond kick), 11:04. Aggies 24–14. Drive: 7 plays, 75 yards, 3:56.
- LSU – Josh Williams 1-yard run (Damian Ramos kick), 7:51. Aggies 24–21. Drive: 8 plays, 73 yards, 3:09.

Fourth quarter

- LSU – Brian Thomas Jr. 23-yard pass from Jayden Daniels (Damian Ramos kick), 11:52. Tigers 28–24. Drive: 3 plays, 61 yards, 0:59.
- LSU – Malik Nabers 21-yard pass from Jayden Daniels (Damian Ramos kick), 8:25. Tigers 35–24. Drive: 4 plays, 53 yards, 1:19.
- TAMU – Max Wright 51-yard pass from Jaylen Henderson (pass failed), 7:20. Tigers 35–30. Drive: 3 plays, 64 yards, 1:01.
- LSU – Kyren Lacy 15-yard pass from Jayden Daniels (Damian Ramos kick), 4:19. Tigers 42–30. Drive: 7 plays, 75 yards, 3:01.

Statistics	TAMU	LSU
First downs	22	21
Total yards	390	389
Rushing yards	96	154
Passing yards	294	235
Turnovers	1	0
Time of possession	36:39	23:21

Team	Category	Player	Statistics
Texas A&M	Passing	Jaylen Henderson	25/35, 294 yards, 2 TD, INT
Texas A&M	Rushing	Le'Veon Moss	9 rushes, 45 yards, TD
Texas A&M	Receiving	Jahdae Walker	4 receptions, 80 yards
LSU	Passing	Jayden Daniels	16/24, 235 yards, 4 TD
LSU	Rushing	Jayden Daniels	11 rushes, 120 yards
LSU	Receiving	Malik Nabers	6 receptions, 122 yards, 2 TD

=== No. 20 Oklahoma State (2023 Texas Bowl) ===
Texas A&M Aggies (7–5) vs No. 20 Oklahoma State Cowboys (9–4)

Quarter	1	2	3	4	Total
Texas A&M	3	3	14	3	23
No. 20 Oklahoma State	10	14	7	0	31

at NRG Stadium • Houston, TX

- Date: Wednesday, December 27, 2023
- Game time: 8:00 p.m. CST
- Game weather: Indoor
- Game attendance: 55,212
- Referee: Chris Coyte
- TV announcers (ESPN): Roy Philpott (play-by-play), Roddy Jones (analyst) & Taylor McGregor (sideline)
- Box score

Game information
First quarter
- (8:38) OSU – Alex Hale 19 yard field goal (Drive: 10 plays, 85 yards, 4:42; Oklahoma State 3–0)
- (4:34) TAMU – Randy Bond 37 yard field goal (Drive: 11 plays, 56 yards, 4:04; Tied 3–3)
- (0:21) OSU – Rashod Owens 13 yard pass from Alan Bowman, Logan Ward kick (Drive: 10 plays, 65 yards, 4:13; Oklahoma State 10–3)

Second quarter

- (11:31) TAMU – Randy Bond 24 yard field goal (Drive: 7 plays, 68 yards, 3:50; Oklahoma State 10–6)
- (9:29) OSU – Gunnar Gundy 10 yard run, Logan Ward kick (Drive: 6 plays, 75 yards, 2:02; Oklahoma State 17–6)
- (0:35) OSU – Ollie Gordon II 1 yard run, Logan Ward kick (Drive: 13 plays, 83 yards, 2:37; Oklahoma State 24–6)

Third quarter

- (9:44) TAMU – Amari Daniels 2 yard run, Randy Bond kick (Drive: 6 plays, 60 yards, 3:23; Oklahoma State 24–13)
- (7:17) OSU – Rashod Owens 18 yard pass from Alan Bowman, Logan Ward kick (Drive: 6 plays, 80 yards, 2:27; Oklahoma State 31–13)
- (4:08) TAMU – Marcel Reed 20 yard run, Randy Bond kick (Drive: 6 plays, 75 yards, 3:09; Oklahoma State 31–20)

Fourth quarter

- (5:07) TAMU – Randy Bond 51 yard field goal (Drive: 7 plays, 47 yards, 2:57; Oklahoma State 31–23)

Statistics	TA&M	OKST
First downs	20	29
Total yards	445	570
Rushing yards	73	134
Passing yards	372	436
Passing: Comp–Att–Int	21-35-1	35-50-2
Time of possession	27:31	32:29

Team	Category	Player	Statistics
Texas A&M	Passing	Marcel Reed	20/33, 361 yards, 1 INT
Texas A&M	Rushing	Marcel Reed	10 carries, 29 yards, 1 TD
Texas A&M	Receiving	Jahdae Walker	8 receptions, 137 yards
Oklahoma State	Passing	Alan Bowman	34/49, 402 yards, 2 TD, 2 INT
Oklahoma State	Rushing	Ollie Gordon II	27 carries, 118 yards, 1 TD
Oklahoma State	Receiving	Rashod Owens	10 receptions, 164 yards, 2 TD

== Rankings ==
Ranking movements Legend: ██ Increase in ranking ██ Decrease in ranking — = Not ranked RV = Received votes
	Week															
Poll	Pre	1	2	3	4	5	6	7	8	9	10	11	12	13	14	Final
AP	23	23	—	—	RV	RV	RV	—	—	—	RV	RV	RV	—		
Coaches	25	23	RV	RV	RV	RV	RV	RV	—	—	—	—	RV	—		
CFP	Not released									—	—	—	—	—		Not released
