= Marcel Reed =

American football player (born 2004)

No. 10 – Texas A&M Aggies
- Position: Quarterback
- Class: (redshirt) Junior

Personal information
- Born: July 8, 2004 (age 22); Nashville, Tennessee, U.S.
- Listed height: 6 ft 1 in (1.85 m)
- Listed weight: 185 lb (84 kg)

Career information
- High school: Montgomery Bell Academy (Nashville, Tennessee)
- College: Texas A&M (2023–present)
- Stats at ESPN

Marcel Reed (born July 8, 2004) is an American college football quarterback for the Texas A&M Aggies.

== Early life ==
Reed was born on July 8, 2004, in Nashville, Tennessee. Reed is the son of former Tennessee State head football coach Rod Reed. He attended Montgomery Bell Academy in Nashville. A four-year starter, Reed finished his high school career with 6,357 yards passing with 62 touchdowns and rushed for 2,277 yards with 38 touchdowns. Reed committed to Texas A&M University to play college football.

== College career ==
Reed began his true freshman season as the fourth-string quarterback behind Conner Weigman, Max Johnson, and Jaylen Henderson. Due to injuries, he moved up to the second quarterback on the depth chart when Henderson was named the starter. He made his collegiate debut in Week 10 against Mississippi State. The following week against Abilene Christian, Reed threw his first touchdown pass for the Aggies. In the 2023 Texas Bowl game against Oklahoma State, he replaced an injured Henderson on the game’s first play and completed 20 of 33 passes for 361 yards and one interception. He also rushed for 29 yards and one touchdown. Reed appeared in three games his first year at Texas A&M in 2023 and was redshirted.

In 2024, Reed began the season as the primary backup to Weigman. In Week 2 against McNeese, he replaced Weigman when the contest was out of reach, marking his season debut. Due to an injury to Weigman, he made his first start for the Aggies the following week against Florida, throwing for 178 yards and two touchdowns while adding 83 rushing yards and a touchdown in a 33–20 victory. Reed won his next starts against Bowling Green and Arkansas before returning to backup duty when Weigman returned from injury. He replaced Weigman in Week 8 against LSU, rushing for 62 yards and scoring three second-half touchdowns to overcome a 17–7 deficit in a 38–23 victory. He then started the final five games of the season, including the 2024 Las Vegas Bowl against USC, where he contributed four total touchdowns.

Reed returned as the Aggies’ starting quarterback in 2025 following Weigman’s transfer to Houston. He opened the season against UTSA, throwing for a career-high four touchdowns in a 42–24 victory. Reed led Texas A&M to an 11–0 start and were ranked third nationally, highlighted by a historic second-half 27-point comeback against South Carolina, in which he threw for a career-high 439 yards. They suffered a loss in the season finale against Texas. Despite the setback, Texas A&M hosted its first playoff game against Miami, where Reed threw two interceptions and was sacked seven times in a 3–10 loss. On the season, he completed 234 of 377 passes for a career-high 3,169 yards, with 25 touchdowns and 12 interceptions, while also rushing for 493 yards and six touchdowns.

=== Statistics ===
Year	Team	Games			Passing								Rushing			
Year	Team	GP	GS	Record	Cmp	Att	Pct	Yds	Y/A	TD	Int	Rtg	Att	Yds	Avg	TD
2023	Texas A&M	3	0	—	21	36	58.3	374	10.4	1	1	149.2	13	45	3.5	1
2024	Texas A&M	11	8	4–4	147	240	61.3	1,864	7.8	15	6	142.1	116	543	4.7	7
2025	Texas A&M	13	13	11–2	234	377	62.1	3,169	8.4	25	12	148.2	104	493	4.7	6
2026	Texas A&M	9	9	4–5	151	265	57.0	1,641	6.2	8	8	113.0	80	206	2.6	3
Career		36	30	19–11	553	918	60.2	7,048	7.7	49	27	136.5	313	1,291	4.1	17

== Personal life ==
Marcel Reed is the son of Rod Reed, the former head football coach at Tennessee State University. His grandfather, Robert "Bob" Reed, played college football at Tennessee State and went on to play professionally in 1965 for the Washington Redskins of the National Football League (NFL).
