= Elijah Robinson =

American football coach (born 1985)

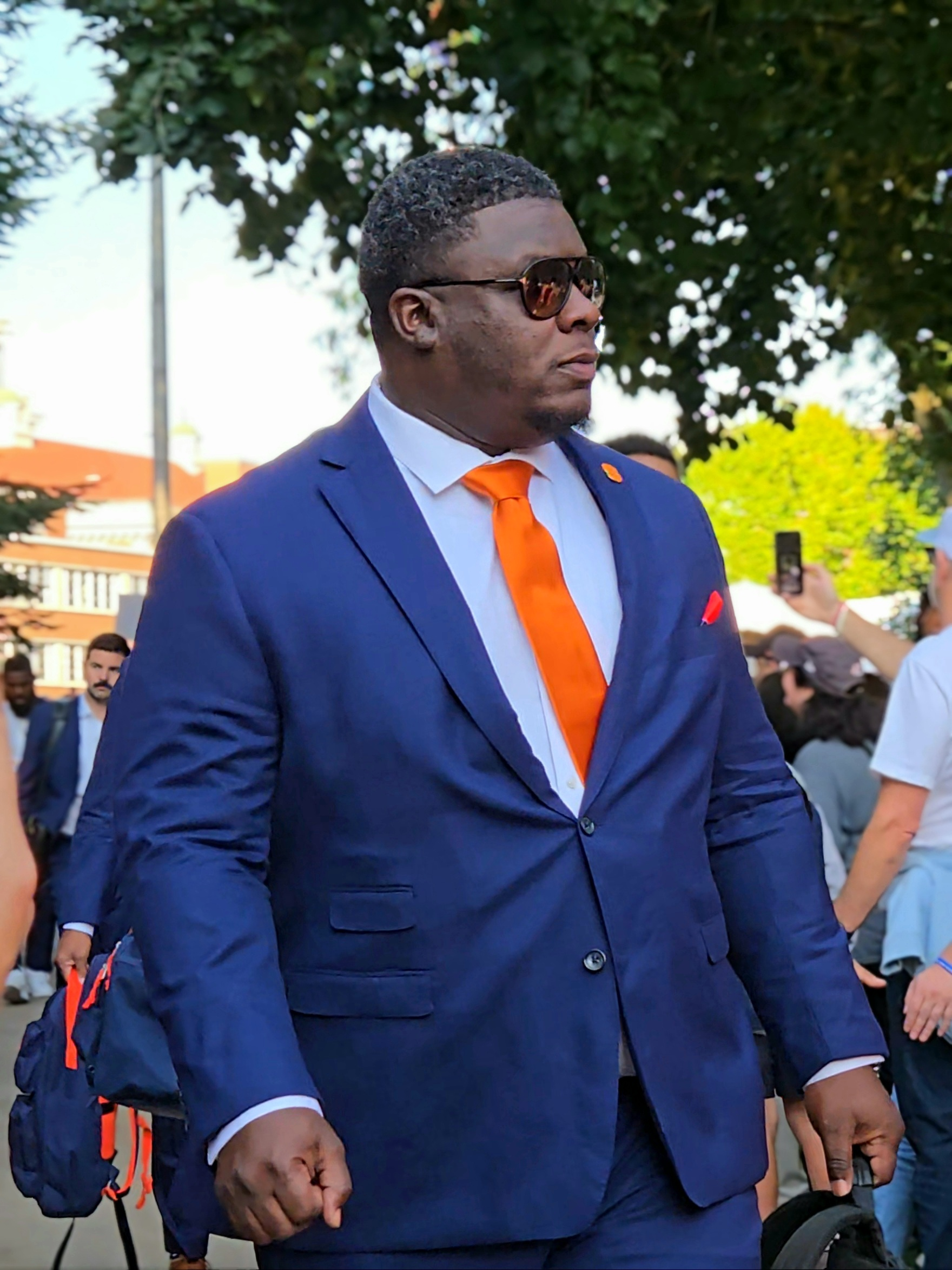
- Robinson with the Syracuse Orange in 2024

Current position
- Title: Co-defensive coordinator and defensive line
- Team: Texas A&M

Biographical details
- Born: May 25, 1985 (age 40); Camden, New Jersey, U.S.

Playing career
- 2004–2007: Penn State
- Positions: Defensive tackle, offensive guard

Coaching career (HC unless noted)
- 2009–2010: Penn State (GA)
- 2011: Penn State (GA/DL)
- 2012–2013: Penn State (DCR/NFLL)
- 2014–2015: Temple (DL)
- 2016: Temple (DL/RGC)
- 2017: Baylor (DL)
- 2018–2021: Texas A&M (DL)
- 2022: Texas A&M (DL/RGC)
- 2023: Texas A&M (DL/co-DC/AHC)
- 2023: Texas A&M (interim HC)
- 2024–2025: Syracuse (AHC/DC)
- 2026–present: Texas A&M (co-DC/DL)

Head coaching record
- Overall: 1–2
- Bowls: 0-1

Elijah Robinson (born May 25, 1985) is an American football coach and former player who is currently the defensive line coach at Texas A&M University. He played college football for the Penn State Nittany Lions and began his coaching career there. Robinson has coached in various defensive roles for the Temple Owls, Baylor Bears, and most recently the Syracuse Orange.

== Early life and education ==
Robinson was born on May 25, 1985, and grew up in Camden, New Jersey. He attended Camden High School before transferring to Woodrow Wilson High School as a senior. At Woodrow Wilson, he helped them win the state championship with a 15–0 record and was chosen first-team All-South Jersey at center while also totaling 13 sacks on defense. He committed to play college football for the Tulane Green Wave and joined the team in 2003, but was ruled ineligible shortly before the season as he had not been approved by the NCAA Clearinghouse. He stayed in shape, became eligible with a passing SAT score, and re-committed to the Penn State Nittany Lions.

As a freshman in 2004 at Penn State, Robinson appeared in three games and had one tackle while playing defensive tackle. He redshirted in 2005. He moved to playing on the offensive line in 2006. In spring 2007, Robinson was injured in practice and, when being checked out, was discovered to have a spinal condition that made him at risk of being paralyzed when playing football. He then retired from football rather than take the risk from playing. Robinson graduated from Penn State in 2008 with a bachelor's degree and later earned a master's degree in 2012.

Robinson is a member of the Eta Alpha chapter of the Iota Phi Theta fraternity.

== Coaching career ==
After graduating from Penn State, Robinson was a graduate assistant with the school from 2009 to 2011; he was an academic graduate assistant the first year and assisted the defense the following two years. He also served as the defensive line coach for a portion of the 2011 season. From 2012 to 2013, he served under coach Bill O'Brien as the team's director of community relations and National Football League (NFL) liaison.

Robinson was hired as the defensive line coach for the Temple Owls in 2014. He added the role of run game coordinator in 2016. He helped three players earn first-team all-conference honors at Temple, including future NFL player Haason Reddick, and in 2016 the team tied the program record with 10 wins while being a top-25 defense nationally for rush defense and yards allowed per attempt. In 2017, he was hired under Matt Rhule to serve as the defensive line coach for the Baylor Bears. He was hired as the defensive line coach of the Texas A&M Aggies in 2018. He helped them rank ninth-best nationally in defense in 2020 and in 2021 the entire starting defensive line he coached was signed into the NFL. He was made the team's run game coordinator in 2022 while retaining his role of defensive line coach, and in 2023 changed to being co-defensive coordinator and assistant head coach in addition to defensive line coach. After head coach Jimbo Fisher was fired with two games remaining, Robinson was promoted to interim head coach.

On December 3, 2023, Robinson accepted the defensive coordinator position at Syracuse University. On December 3, 2025, Syracuse head coach Fran Brown announced that Robinson had been demoted to co-defensive coordinator and defensive line coach.. On December 21st, 2025, it was announced that Robinson would return to Texas A&M as the team's defensive line coach, reuniting with Mike Elko.

== Head coaching record ==
Year	Team	Overall	Conference	Standing	Bowl/playoffs
Texas A&M Aggies (Southeastern Conference) (2023)
2023	Texas A&M	1–2	0–1	4th (Western)	L Texas
Texas A&M:		1–2	0–1		
Total:		1–2			
