= Rashod Owens =

American football player (born 2001)

No. 86 – Calgary Stampeders
- Position: Wide receiver
- Roster status: Practice roster
- CFL status: American

Personal information
- Born: December 7, 2001 (age 24); San Antonio, Texas, U.S.
- Listed height: 6 ft 2 in (1.88 m)
- Listed weight: 226 lb (103 kg)

Career information
- High school: Theodore Roosevelt (San Antonio, Texas)
- College: Oklahoma State (2020–2024)
- NFL draft: 2025: undrafted

Career history
- Cincinnati Bengals (2025)*; Calgary Stampeders (2026–present)*
- * Offseason or practice squad member only
- Stats at Pro Football Reference

Rashod Owens (born December 7, 2001) is an American professional football wide receiver. He played college football for the Oklahoma State Cowboys.

== Early life ==
Owens attended Theodore Roosevelt High School in San Antonio, Texas. As a junior, he rushed for 1,454 yards and 23 touchdowns on 174 carries. Coming out of high school, Owens was rated as a three-star recruit and committed to play college football for the Oklahoma State Cowboys.

== College career ==
As a freshman in 2020, Owens hauled in two passes for 19 yards in four games. In 2021, he totaled 17 receptions for 257 yards and a touchdown. In 2022, Owens made six catches for 85 yards. In week 6 of the 2023 season, he racked up five receptions for 75 yards in a win over Kansas State. In week 13, Owens recorded ten catches for 136 yards versus rival Oklahoma. In the 2023 Texas Bowl, he hauled in ten receptions for 164 yards and two touchdowns in a victory over Texas A&M, earning game MVP honors. During the 2023 season, Owens notched 63 catches for 895 yards and five touchdowns. Heading into the 2024 season, he was named to the Biletnikoff Award watch list. In 2024, Owens recorded 32 receptions for 515 yards and four touchdowns.

== Professional career ==
Pre-draft measurables
Height	Weight	Arm length	Hand span	Wingspan	40-yard dash	10-yard split	20-yard split	20-yard shuttle	Three-cone drill	Vertical jump	Broad jump	Bench press
6 ft 2 in (1.88 m)	218 lb (99 kg)	32 in (0.81 m)	9 1/2 in (0.24 m)	6 ft 6 7/8 in (2.00 m)	4.56 s	1.64 s	2.66 s	4.39 s	7.19 s	34.0 in (0.86 m)	10 ft 4 in (3.15 m)	19 reps
All values from Pro Day

After not being selected in the 2025 NFL draft, Owens signed with the Cincinnati Bengals as an undrafted free agent. He was waived on August 25.
