= Craig Stump =

American football player and coach (born 1965)

Current position
- Title: Head coach
- Team: Atascocita HS (TX)

Biographical details
- Born: January 30, 1965

Playing career
- 1984–1987: Texas A&M
- Position: Quarterback

Coaching career (HC unless noted)
- 1988–1991: Tulane (assistant)
- 1992–1995: Southwest Texas State (RB)
- 1996: Southwest Texas State (OC)
- 1997–2002: Mississippi State (WR)
- 2003–2004: Monsignor Kelly Catholic HS (TX)
- 2005–2011: West Brook HS (TX)
- 2012–present: Atascocita HS (TX)

Craig Stump (born January 30, 1965) is an American football coach and former player. He is the current football coach at Atascocita High School in Atascocita, Texas. Stump played college football as a quarterback at Texas A&M University.

== Playing career ==
Stump was a member of three consecutive Southwest Conference championship teams as a quarterback for Texas A&M. He was pressed into duty as a freshman in 1984 after standout Kevin Murray was injured in an early-season non-conference game. Although Stump filled in capably completing 94 of his 189 attempts for 1135 yards, he would spend his sophomore and junior seasons on the bench watching Murray break most of the Aggies' passing records. Since the NCAA had granted Murray an extra year of eligibility, considering the 1984 year a medical redshirt season, it appeared that Stump would spend his senior year as a backup once again. When Murray decided to leave school early for the National Football League Draft, Stump had his opportunity.

Because of the loss of Murray and several other key Aggie players after the 1986 season, expectations were not high entering the 1987 campaign. Surprising many, Stump and freshman phenom Bucky Richardson led the Aggies to an unexpected conference championship and a third straight Cotton Bowl Classic appearance, a 35–10 victory over Notre Dame and Heisman Trophy-winner Tim Brown.

== Coaching career ==
Stump was an assistant coach at Tulane University before moving to Southwest Texas State University—now known as Texas State University in 1992 as running backs coach. He was promoted to offensive coordinator in 1996. Stump spent six years, from 1997 to 2002 as an assistant at Mississippi State University under his former college coach, Jackie Sherrill.

Stump was the head coach at Monsignor Kelly Catholic High School, in Beaumont, Texas from 2003 to 2004. He moved to West Brook High School, also in Beaumont, in 2005. In 2007, he won his second consecutive District 21-5A title by leading his team to a 10–1 record. Stump has been the head football coach at Atascocita High School in Atascocita, Texas since 2012.
