= 2023 Texas Bowl =

Postseason college football bowl game

2023 TaxAct Texas Bowl
- 17th Texas Bowl
Texas A&M Aggies	Oklahoma State Cowboys
(7–5)	(9–4)
SEC	Big 12
23	31
Head coach: Elijah Robinson (interim)	Head coach: Mike Gundy
	AP / Coaches / CFP; 22 / 21 / 20
	1	2	3	4	Total
Texas A&M	3	3	14	3	23
Oklahoma State	10	14	7	0	31
- Date: December 27, 2023
- Season: 2023
- Stadium: NRG Stadium
- Location: Houston, Texas
- MVP: Rashod Owens (WR, Oklahoma State)
- Favorite: Texas A&M by 3.5
- Referee: Chris Coyte (Big 10)
- Attendance: 56,212

United States TV coverage
- Network: ESPN; ESPN Radio
- Announcers: Roy Philpott (play-by-play), Roddy Jones (analyst), and Taylor McGregor (sideline) (ESPN); Marc Kestecher (play-by-play) and Kelly Stouffer (analyst) (ESPN Radio)

International TV coverage
- Network: ESPN Deportes

The 2023 Texas Bowl was a college football bowl game played on December 27, 2023, at NRG Stadium in Houston, Texas. The 17th annual Texas Bowl featured Oklahoma State from the Big 12 Conference and Texas A&M from the Southeastern Conference (SEC). The game began at approximately 9:00 p.m. EST and was aired on ESPN. The Texas Bowl was one of the 2023–24 bowl games concluding the 2023 FBS football season. The bowl was sponsored by tax preparation software company TaxAct and was officially named the TaxAct Texas Bowl.

== Teams ==
Consistent with conference tie-ins, the bowl featured the Oklahoma State Cowboys of the Big 12 Conference and the Texas A&M Aggies of the Southeastern Conference (SEC).

This was the 29th meeting between Oklahoma State and Texas A&M; Entering the game, the Aggies led the Cowboys in the all-time series, 18–10. This was also the third time the two teams faced each other in a bowl game; Texas A&M won both prior meetings, the 1981 Independence Bowl and 2019 Texas Bowl.

On two occasions, Oklahoma State and Texas A&M were in the same conference, playing together in the Southwest Conference (SWC) during 1915–1924 and in the Big 12 during 1996–2011.

=== Oklahoma State Cowboys ===
The Cowboys entered the game with a 9–4 record (7–2 in the Big 12) and ranked 20th in the College Football Playoff rankings. Having defeated Oklahoma on November 4, 27–24, the Cowboys won the tiebreaker for second place in the Big 12 and advanced to the 2023 Big 12 Championship Game, which they lost to Texas, 49–21.

This was Oklahoma State's second Texas Bowl, following the aforementioned loss to Texas A&M in the 2019 game.

=== Texas A&M Aggies ===
The Aggies entered the game with a 7–5 record (4–4 in the SEC), having finished in fourth place in their conference's West Division.

This was Texas A&M's fourth Texas Bowl, setting a new mark for most appearances in the game. In addition to their 2019 triumph over Oklahoma State, the Aggies won the 2011 Meineke Car Care Bowl of Texas (when the bowl operated under that name) and lost the 2016 Texas Bowl.

== Game summary ==
2023 TaxAct Texas Bowl

Quarter	1	2	3	4	Total
Texas A&M	3	3	14	3	23
No. 20 Oklahoma State	10	14	7	0	31

at NRG Stadium • Houston, Texas

- Date: Tuesday, December 27, 2023
- Game time: 9:00 p.m. EST (8:00 p.m. CST)
- Game weather: N/A (indoor stadium with retractable roof)
- Game attendance: 55,212
- Referee: Chris Coyte
- TV announcers (ESPN): Roy Philpott (play-by-play), Roddy Jones (analyst), and Taylor McGregor (sideline)
- Box score

Game information

First quarter

- (8:38) OSU – Alex Hale 19 yard field goal (Drive: 10 plays, 85 yards, 4:42; Oklahoma State 3–0)
- (4:34) TAMU – Randy Bond 37 yard field goal (Drive: 11 plays, 56 yards, 4:04; Tied 3–3)
- (0:21) OSU – Rashod Owens 13 yard pass from Alan Bowman, Logan Ward kick (Drive: 10 plays, 65 yards, 4:13; Oklahoma State 10–3)

Second quarter

- (11:31) TAMU – Randy Bond 24 yard field goal (Drive: 7 plays, 68 yards, 3:50; Oklahoma State 10–6)
- (9:29) OSU – Gunnar Gundy 10 yard run, Logan Ward kick (Drive: 6 plays, 75 yards, 2:02; Oklahoma State 17–6)
- (0:35) OSU – Ollie Gordon II 1 yard run, Logan Ward kick (Drive: 13 plays, 83 yards, 2:37; Oklahoma State 24–6)

Third quarter

- (9:44) TAMU – Amari Daniels 2 yard run, Randy Bond kick (Drive: 6 plays, 60 yards, 3:23; Oklahoma State 24–13)
- (7:17) OSU – Rashod Owens 18 yard pass from Alan Bowman, Logan Ward kick (Drive: 6 plays, 80 yards, 2:27; Oklahoma State 31–13)
- (4:08) TAMU – Marcel Reed 20 yard run, Randy Bond kick (Drive: 6 plays, 75 yards, 3:09; Oklahoma State 31–20)

Fourth quarter

- (5:07) TAMU – Randy Bond 51 yard field goal (Drive: 7 plays, 47 yards, 2:57; Oklahoma State 31–23)

=== Statistics ===
Statistics	TAMU	OSU
First downs	20	29
Plays–yards	60–445	64–570
Rushes–yards	25–73	29–134
Passing yards	372	436
Passing: comp–att–int	21–35–2	35–50–2
Time of possession	27:31	32:29

Team	Category	Player	Statistics
Texas A&M	Passing	Marcel Reed	20/33, 361 yards, 1 INT
Texas A&M	Rushing	Marcel Reed	10 carries, 29 yards, 1 TD
Texas A&M	Receiving	Jahdae Walker	8 receptions, 137 yards
Oklahoma State	Passing	Alan Bowman	34/49, 402 yards, 2 TD, 2 INT
Oklahoma State	Rushing	Ollie Gordon II	27 carries, 118 yards, 1 TD
Oklahoma State	Receiving	Rashod Owens	10 receptions, 164 yards, 2 TD
