= Moose Muhammad III =

American football player (born 2001)

Profile
- Position: Wide receiver

Personal information
- Born: May 5, 2001 (age 25); Charlotte, North Carolina, U.S.
- Listed height: 6 ft 0 in (1.83 m)
- Listed weight: 195 lb (88 kg)

Career information
- High school: Myers Park (Charlotte)
- College: Texas A&M (2020–2024)
- NFL draft: 2025: undrafted

Career history
- Carolina Panthers (2025)*
- * Offseason or practice squad member only

Muhsin "Moose" Muhammad III (born May 5, 2001) is an American professional football wide receiver. He played college football for the Texas A&M Aggies.

== Early life ==
Muhammad III attended Myers Park High School in Charlotte, North Carolina. He was selected to the 2020 All-American Bowl. Muhammad III committed to Texas A&M University to play college football.

== College career ==
Muhammad III played in three games his first at Texas A&M in 2020, and did not record a reception. He played in eight games in 2021 and had 10 receptions for 153 yards and four touchdowns. In 2022, he became a starter and finished the year with 38 receptions for 610 yards and four touchdowns.

== Professional career ==
Pre-draft measurables
Height	Weight	Arm length	Hand span	Wingspan	40-yard dash	10-yard split	20-yard split	20-yard shuttle	Three-cone drill	Vertical jump	Broad jump	Bench press
6 ft 0 1/4 in (1.84 m)	195 lb (88 kg)	30 3/4 in (0.78 m)	9 3/4 in (0.25 m)	6 ft 1 3/8 in (1.86 m)	4.67 s	1.61 s	2.66 s	4.32 s	6.96 s	31.0 in (0.79 m)	10 ft 1 in (3.07 m)	11 reps
All values from Pro Day

After going undrafted in the 2025 NFL draft, Muhammad was signed by his father’s former team, the Carolina Panthers, on April 27, 2025. On May 20, he was waived by the Panthers. Muhammad reverted to the Panthers' injured reserve after clearing waivers. He was waived again on July 14.

== Personal life ==
His father, Muhsin Muhammad, played in the NFL.
