= Leon Johnson (wide receiver) =

American football player (born 2001)

Leon Johnson III
Profile
- Position: Wide receiver

Personal information
- Born: June 12, 2001 (age 25); Seattle, Washington, U.S.
- Listed height: 6 ft 5 in (1.96 m)
- Listed weight: 207 lb (94 kg)

Career information
- High school: Bothell (Bothell, Washington)
- College: George Fox (2019–2022); Oklahoma State (2023)
- NFL draft: 2024: undrafted

Career history
- Los Angeles Chargers (2024)*
- * Offseason or practice squad member only

Awards and highlights
- First-team AFCA DIII All-American (2022); NWC Offensive Player of the Year (2022); First-team All-NWC (2022); Second-team All-NWC (2021)

Leon Johnson III (born June 12, 2001) is an American professional football wide receiver. He previously played college football for the Oklahoma State Cowboys and for the George Fox Bruins.

== Early life ==
Johnson attended high school at Bothell. In his senior season he recorded 24 receptions for 334 yards and three touchdowns. Coming out of high school, Johnson decided to commit to play college football for the George Fox Bruins.

== College career ==
=== George Fox ===
In Johnson's first three seasons in 2019, 2020, and 2021, Johnson would only play in two seasons due to the 2020 season being canceled due to COVID-19. However he would tally 55 receptions for 990 yards and nine touchdowns. During the 2022 season, Johnson totaled 55 receptions for 1,156 yards and 14 touchdowns en route to being named an All-American. After the conclusion of the 2022 season, Johnson decided to enter his name into the NCAA transfer portal.

=== Oklahoma State ===
Johnson decided to transfer to play for the Oklahoma State Cowboys. In week eight of the 2023 season, Johnson earned his first start of the season where he notched six receptions for 149 yards, as he helped the Cowboys to a win over Cincinnati. In week nine, Johnson tallied five catches for 70 yards as he helped Oklahoma State win the final Bedlam beating rival Oklahoma. During the 2023 season, Johnson recorded 33 receptions for 539 yards and one touchdown. After the conclusion of the 2023 season, Johnson decided to declare for the 2024 NFL draft.

== Professional career ==
Pre-draft measurables
Height	Weight	Arm length	Hand span	40-yard dash	10-yard split	20-yard split	20-yard shuttle	Three-cone drill	Vertical jump	Broad jump	Bench press
6 ft 4 3/5 in (1.95 m)	210 lb (95 kg)	34 1/8 in (0.87 m)	10 in (0.25 m)	4.55 s	1.58 s	2.66 s	4.38 s	7.16 s	35 in (0.89 m)	10 ft 10 in (3.30 m)	06 reps
All values from Pro Day

After not being selected in the 2024 NFL draft, Johnson decided to sign with the Los Angeles Chargers as an undrafted free agent. He was waived by the Chargers on August 19, 2024.
