= Conner Weigman =

American football player (born 2003)

No. 1 – Houston Cougars
- Position: Quarterback
- Class: Redshirt Senior

Personal information
- Born: August 8, 2003 (age 23)
- Listed height: 6 ft 3 in (1.91 m)
- Listed weight: 210 lb (95 kg)

Career information
- High school: Bridgeland (Cypress, Texas)
- College: Texas A&M (2022–2024); Houston (2025–present)
- Stats at ESPN

Conner Weigman (born August 8, 2003) is an American college football quarterback who plays for the Houston Cougars. He previously played for the Texas A&M Aggies.

== Early life ==
Weigman grew up in Cypress, Texas, and attended Bridgeland High School, where he played baseball and football. He became Bridgeland's starting quarterback during his sophomore season. Weigman passed for 3,808 yards and 42 touchdowns against 11 interceptions in his junior season. As a senior, Weigman passed for 2,588 yards and 29 touchdowns with six interceptions while also rushing for 754 yards and nine touchdowns. At the end of the season he was named the Offensive Player of the Year by the Houston Touchdown Club and the National High School Quarterback Of The Year by the National Quarterback Club

Weigman was rated a five-star recruit and committed to play college football at Texas A&M after considering offers from Arkansas, Baylor, Florida, Oklahoma, and Texas. He was also considered one of the best baseball prospects in Texas and announced his intention to play for the Texas A&M Aggies baseball team as a shortstop.

== College career ==
=== Texas A&M ===
Weigman joined the Texas A&M Aggies as an early enrollee in January 2022. He also withdrew his name from the 2022 Major League Baseball draft. Weigman ultimately decided against playing baseball in order to participate in spring practices. Weigman entered his true freshman season as Texas A&M's third-string quarterback with the intention of redshirting the year. Weigman made his first collegiate start in week 9 against no. 15 Ole Miss, finishing 28-of-44 for 338 yards and four touchdowns in the 28–31 loss. He started Texas A&M's final four games and finished the season with 896 passing yards and eight touchdown passes.

In 2023, Weigman was named the Aggies' starting quarterback entering his sophomore season after competing with Max Johnson during preseason training camp. Weigman started the first four games until suffering a season-ending foot injury.

On December 3, 2024, Weigman announced that he would enter the transfer portal.

=== Houston ===
On December 11, 2024, Weigman announced that he would transfer to Houston. In 2025, Weigman had a very successful redshirt junior year, ending the season with a passer rating of 147.4 while throwing for 25 touchdowns. Weigman also was second on the Cougars with 700 rushing yards and led the team with 11 rushing touchdowns. On December 27, 2025, Weigman ended the season leading the Cougars to a 38–35 victory over LSU in the Texas Bowl. Weigman threw four touchdowns and was named MVP of the game.

=== Statistics ===
Year	Team	Games			Passing								Rushing			
Year	Team	GP	GS	Record	Cmp	Att	Pct	Yds	Y/A	TD	Int	Rtg	Att	Yds	Avg	TD
2022	Texas A&M	5	4	2–2	73	132	55.3	896	6.8	8	0	132.3	27	97	3.6	0
2023	Texas A&M	4	4	3–1	82	119	68.9	979	8.2	8	2	156.8	12	63	5.3	2
2024	Texas A&M	6	5	4–1	64	114	56.1	819	7.2	3	5	116.4	28	101	3.6	0
2025	Houston	13	13	10–3	231	355	65.2	2,711	7.6	25	9	147.4	171	700	4.1	11
2026	Houston	10	10	7–3	196	299	65.6	2,552	8.5	25	3	162.8	79	308	3.9	7
Career		38	36	26–10	647	1,020	63.4	7,951	7.8	69	19	147.5	317	1,269	4.0	20
