= Ollie Gordon II =

American football player (born 2004)

No. 0 – Miami Dolphins
- Position: Running back
- Roster status: Active

Personal information
- Born: January 15, 2004 (age 22); Fort Worth, Texas, U.S.
- Listed height: 6 ft 2 in (1.88 m)
- Listed weight: 225 lb (102 kg)

Career information
- High school: Trinity (Euless, Texas)
- College: Oklahoma State (2022–2024)
- NFL draft: 2025: 6th round, 179th overall pick

Career history
- Miami Dolphins (2025–present)

Awards and highlights
- Doak Walker Award (2023); Earl Campbell Tyler Rose Award (2023); Unanimous All-American (2023); NCAA rushing yards leader (2023); Big 12 Offensive Player of the Year (2023); First-team All-Big 12 (2023)

Career NFL statistics as of Week 10, 2026
- Rushing yards: 738
- Rushing average: 3.7
- Rushing touchdowns: 7
- Receptions: 18
- Receiving yards: 94
- Receiving touchdowns: 1
- Stats at Pro Football Reference

Ollie Gordon II (born January 15, 2004) is an American professional football running back for the Miami Dolphins of the National Football League (NFL). He played college football for the Oklahoma State Cowboys, winning the Doak Walker Award in 2023 after rushing for over 1,700 yards with 21 touchdowns. Gordon was selected by the Dolphins in the sixth round of the 2025 NFL draft.

== Early life ==
Gordon was born and raised in Fort Worth, Texas, and attended Trinity High School in Euless, Texas. While in high school Gordon was named the Fort Worth Star-Telegram 2020 Male High School Athlete of the Year. A 4 star prospect, he committed to play college football at Oklahoma State University.

== College career ==
After receiving limited playing time for the majority of the season, Gordon would break out for a 136-yard performance against West Virginia in the final game of the 2022 season. For his performance against West Virginia, Gordon was named the PFF True Freshman of the Week. Gordon emerged as a star in 2023, leading the country in rushing yards with 1,732. He scored 21 rushing touchdowns as well. He was named the 2023 Big 12 Offensive Player of the Year and won the Doak Walker Award after rushing for over 1,700 yards with 22 total touchdowns. Following a lackluster 2024 season, Gordon declared for the 2025 NFL draft.

=== Statistics ===
Legend
	Led NCAA Division I FBS
**Bold**	Career high

Year	Team	Games		Rushing				Receiving				Scrimmage			
Year	Team	GP	GS	Att	Yds	Avg	TD	Rec	Yds	Avg	TD	Plays	Yds	Avg	TD
2022	Oklahoma State	13	1	62	308	5.0	2	12	76	6.3	**2**	74	384	5.2	4
2023	Oklahoma State	**14**	**14**	**285**	**1,732**	**6.1**	**21**	**39**	**330**	**8.5**	1	**324**	**2,062**	**6.4**	**22**
2024	Oklahoma State	12	12	190	880	4.6	13	29	179	6.2	1	219	1,059	4.8	14
Career		39	27	537	2,920	5.4	36	80	585	7.3	4	617	3,505	5.7	40

== Professional career ==
Pre-draft measurables
Height	Weight	Arm length	Hand span	Wingspan	40-yard dash	10-yard split	20-yard split	Vertical jump	Broad jump	Bench press
6 ft 1 3/8 in (1.86 m)	226 lb (103 kg)	32 3/4 in (0.83 m)	9 1/2 in (0.24 m)	6 ft 8 in (2.03 m)	4.61 s	1.60 s	2.72 s	34.5 in (0.88 m)	10 ft 0 in (3.05 m)	12 reps
All values from NFL Combine/Pro Day

Gordon was selected in the sixth round, with the 179th pick of the 2025 NFL draft by the Miami Dolphins.

As a rookie, Gordon had 70 carries for 199 rushing yards and three rushing touchdowns to go with a receiving touchdown.

== Personal life ==
On June 30, 2024, Gordon was arrested on suspicion of driving under the influence.
