= 2023 Georgia Bulldogs football team =

American college football season

2023 Georgia Bulldogs football

SEC Eastern Division champion Orange Bowl Champion

SEC Championship Game, L 24–27 vs. Alabama

Orange Bowl, W 63–3 vs. Florida State
- Conference: Southeastern Conference
- Eastern Division

Ranking
- Coaches: No. 3
- AP: No. 4
- Record: 13–1 (8–0 SEC)
- Head coach: Kirby Smart (8th season)
- Offensive coordinator: Mike Bobo (9th season)
- Offensive scheme: Pro spread
- Co-defensive coordinators: Glenn Schumann (5th season); Will Muschamp (2nd season)
- Base defense: 3–4
- Home stadium: Sanford Stadium

Uniform
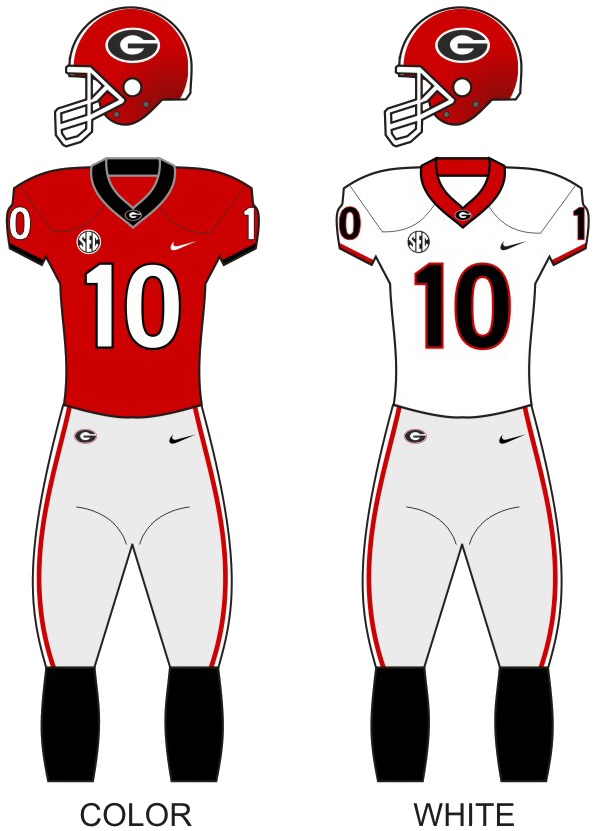

2023 Southeastern Conference football standings
	Conf.			Overall
Team	W		L	W		L
Eastern Division
No. 4 Georgia xy	8	–	0	13	–	1
No. 8 Missouri	6	–	2	11	–	2
No. 17 Tennessee	4	–	4	9	–	4
Kentucky	3	–	5	7	–	6
Florida	3	–	5	5	–	7
South Carolina	3	–	5	5	–	7
Vanderbilt	0	–	8	2	–	10
Western Division
No. 5 Alabama xy$^	8	–	0	12	–	2
No. 9 Ole Miss	6	–	2	11	–	2
No. 12 LSU	6	–	2	10	–	3
Texas A&M	4	–	4	7	–	6
Auburn	3	–	5	6	–	7
Mississippi State	1	–	7	5	–	7
Arkansas	1	–	7	4	–	8
Championship: Alabama 27, Georgia 24
^ – College Football Playoff participant; $ – Conference champion; x – Division champion/co-champions; y – Championship game participant; Rankings from AP Poll

The 2023 Georgia Bulldogs football team represented the University of Georgia in the 2023 NCAA Division I FBS football season as a member of the Southeastern Conference. The team was led by Kirby Smart in his eighth year as Georgia's head coach. The Bulldogs entered this season as the two-time defending consensus national champions.

This was also the final year for the East division, as Texas and Oklahoma would join the SEC in 2024.

Georgia began the season as the two-time defending national champions aiming for a three-peat. Georgia produced the longest win streak in SEC history at 29 games. Alabama ended the Bulldogs' 29 game win streak in the SEC Championship game with a 27–24 win. Georgia would not only fail to make the College Football Playoff and play for a third consecutive national title, but the team also became the first to miss the playoffs after being ranked number one going into championship weekend.

With Georgia's 63–3 win over Florida State in the Orange Bowl, the team set a new record for the largest margin of victory of any bowl game result with a 60-point margin, breaking the old record of 58 set during the 2023 CFP National Championship, when Georgia beat TCU 65–7.

== Offseason ==
=== Team departures ===
2023 Georgia offseason departures
Name	Number	Pos.	Height, Weight	Year	Hometown	Notes
Darnell Washington	#0	TE	6'7, 265	Junior	Las Vegas, NV	Declared for 2023 NFL Draft
Rian Davis	#0	LB	6'2, 230	Junior	Apopka, FL	Elected to transfer to UCF
Nolan Smith	#4	LB	6'3, 235	Senior	Savannah, GA	Graduated/declared for 2023 NFL Draft
Kelee Ringo	#5	CB	6'2, 205	(redshirt) Sophomore	Tacoma, WA	Declared for 2023 NFL Draft
Adonai Mitchell	#5	WR	6'4, 190	Sophomore	Missouri City, TX	Elected to transfer to Texas
Kenny McIntosh	#6	RB	6'1, 210	Senior	Fort Lauderdale, FL	Graduated/declared for 2023 NFL Draft
Dominick Blaylock	#8	WR	6'1, 205	Junior	Marietta, GA	Elected to transfer to Georgia Tech
MJ Sherman	#8	LB	6'2, 250	Junior	Baltimore, MD	Elected to transfer to Nebraska
Jaheim Singletary	#9	DB	6'1, 175	Freshman	Jacksonville, FL	Elected to transfer to Arkansas
Kearis Jackson	#10	WR	6'0, 201	Senior	Fort Valley, GA	Graduated/declared for 2023 NFL Draft
Stetson Bennett	#13	QB	5'11, 190	(redshirt) Grad Student	Atlanta, GA	Graduated/declared for 2023 NFL Draft
Arik Gilbert	#14	TE	6'5, 248	(redshirt) Sophomore	Marietta, GA	Elected to transfer to Nebraska
Trezmen Marshall	#15	LB	6'1, 230	Junior	Homerville, GA	Elected to transfer to Alabama
Tykee Smith	#23	S	5'10, 198	Senior	Philadelphia, PA	Graduated/declared for 2023 NFL Draft
Marcus Washington, Jr.	#28	DB	6'1, 185	(redshirt) Freshman	Grovetown, GA	Elected to transfer to Louisville
Christopher Smith II	#29	S	5'11, 190	Senior	Atlanta, GA	Graduated/declared for 2023 NFL Draft
Robert Beal Jr.	#33	LB	6'4, 255	Senior	Duluth, GA	Graduated/declared for 2023 NFL Draft
Randon Jernigan	#36	WR	6'0, 183	Senior	Atlanta, GA	Graduated
Davis Day	#43	TE	6'4, 240	Senior	Hamilton, GA	Graduated
George Vining	#46	WR	6'0, 205	Senior	Macon, GA	Graduated
Payne Walker	#47	LS	6'2, 249	Senior	Suwanee, GA	Graduated
Joseph Daniels	#48	DB	5'10, 188	(redshirt) Grad Student	Johns Creek, GA	Graduated
Warren Ericson	#50	OL	6'4, 305	Senior	Suwanee, GA	Graduated
Broderick Jones	#59	OL	6'4, 315	(redshirt) Sophomore	Lithonia, GA	Declared for 2023 NFL Draft
Bill Norton	#60	DL	6'6, 300	Junior	Memphis, TN	Elected to transfer to Arizona
Jacob Hood	#64	OL	6'8, 350	Freshman	Nashville, TN	Elected to transfer to Nebraska
Warren McClendon	#70	G	6'4, 300	Junior	Brunswick, GA	Declared for NFL draft
Griffin Scroogs	#72	OL	6’3, 315	(redshirt) Freshman	Grayson, GA	Elected to transfer to Appalachian State
Devin Willock	#77	OL	6'7, 335	(redshirt) Sophomore	New Milford, NJ	Died in a car accident with football staffer
Brett Seither	#80	TE	6'5, 228	Junior	Clearwater, FL	Elected to transfer to Georgia Tech
Ryland Goede	#88	TE	6'6, 240	Junior	Kennesaw, GA	Elected to transfer to Mississippi State
Jalen Carter	#88	DT	6'3, 310	Junior	Apopka, FL	Declared for 2023 NFL Draft
Tramel Walthour	#90	DL	6'3, 280	Senior	Hinesville, GA	Graduated
Shone Washington	#95	DL	6'4, 270	Freshman	New Orleans, LA	Elected to transfer to East Mississippi CC
Jack Podlesny	#96	PK	6'2, 190	Senior	St. Simons Island, GA	Graduated
Bear Alexander	#99	DL	6'3, 315	Freshman	Terrell, TX	Elected to transfer to USC

=== Transfer portal ===
==== Outgoing transfers ====
Sixteen Georgia Bulldogs players via NCAA Transfer Portal during or after the 2022 season.

Georgia outgoing transfers
Name	No.	Pos.	Height/Weight	Year	Hometown	College transferred to	Sources
Rian Davis	#0	LB	6'2, 230	Junior	Apopka, FL	UCF	
Adonai Mitchell	#5	WR	6'4, 190	Sophomore	Missouri City, TX	Texas	
Dominick Blaylock	#8	WR	6'1, 205	Junior	Marietta, GA	Georgia Tech	
MJ Sherman	#8	LB	6'2, 250	Junior	Baltimore, MD	Nebraska	
Jaheim Singletary	#9	DB	6'1, 175	Freshman	Jacksonville, FL	Arkansas	
Arik Gilbert	#14	TE	6'5, 248	(redshirt) Sophomore	Marietta, GA	Nebraska	
Trezmen Marshall	#15	LB	6'1, 230	Junior	Homerville, GA	Alabama	
Marcus Washington, Jr.	#28	DB	6'1, 185	(redshirt) Freshman	Grovetown, GA	Louisville	
Bill Norton	#60	DL	6'6, 300	Sophomore	Memphis, TN	Arizona	
Jacob Hood	#64	OL	6'8, 350	Freshman	Nashville, TN	Nebraska	
Griffin Scroggs	#72	OL	6’3, 315	(redshirt) Freshman	Grayson, GA	Appalachian State	
Weston Wallace	#79	OL	6’4, 320	(redshirt) Sophomore	Eatonton, GA	Georgia Southern	
Brett Seither	#80	TE	6'5, 228	Junior	Clearwater, FL	Georgia Tech	
Ryland Goede	#88	TE	6'6, 240	Junior	Kennesaw, GA	Mississippi State	
Shone Washington	#95	DL	6'4, 270	Freshman	New Orleans, LA	East Mississippi CC	
Bear Alexander	#99	DL	6'3, 315	Freshman	Terrell, TX	USC	

==== Incoming transfers ====
Over the off-season, Georgia added four scholarship players via transfer portal. According to 247 Sports, Georgia had the No. 40 ranked transfer class in the country.

Georgia incoming transfers
Name	No.	Pos.	Height/Weight	Year	Hometown	Previous school	Sources
Dominic Lovett	#7	WR	5'10, 175	Sophomore	East St. Louis, IL	Missouri	
Rara Thomas	#0	WR	6'2, 200	Sophomore	Eufaula, AL	Mississippi State	
Deyon Bouie	#3	CB	5'11, 180	Freshman	Bainbridge, GA	Texas A&M	
Len'Neth Whitehead	#27	RB	6'2, 220	RS Freshman	Athens, GA	Tennessee	

=== Recruiting class ===
Georgia signed 26 players in the class of 2023. The Bulldogs' recruiting class ranks No. 2 in the 247Sports and Rivals rankings. 19 signees were ranked in the ESPN 300 top prospect list. Georgia also signed walk-ons during national signing period.

College recruiting
Name	Hometown	School	Height	Weight	Commit date
Joenel Aguero; S	Lynn, MA	St. John's Prep	6 ft 0 in (1.83 m)	200 lb (91 kg)	Jul 23, 2022
Joenel Aguero; S	Recruit ratings: Rivals: 247Sports: On3: ESPN: (87)				
Samuel M'Pemba; DE	Olivette, MO	IMG Academy (FL)	6 ft 4 in (1.93 m)	20 lb (9.1 kg)	Dec 4, 2022
Samuel M'Pemba; DE	Recruit ratings: Rivals: 247Sports: On3: ESPN: (87)				
Damon Wilson; DE	Venice, FL	Venice High School	6 ft 4 in (1.93 m)	235 lb (107 kg)	Dec 21, 2022
Damon Wilson; DE	Recruit ratings: Rivals: 247Sports: On3: ESPN: (87)				
AJ Harris; CB	Phenix City, AL	Central High School	6 ft 2 in (1.88 m)	180 lb (82 kg)	Jun 16, 2022
AJ Harris; CB	Recruit ratings: Rivals: 247Sports: On3: ESPN: (87)				
Troy Bowles; LB	Tampa, FL	Jesuit High School	6 ft 1 in (1.85 m)	210 lb (95 kg)	Jul 16, 2022
Troy Bowles; LB	Recruit ratings: Rivals: 247Sports: On3: ESPN: (86)				
Raylen Wilson; LB	Tallahassee, FL	Lincoln High School	6 ft 2 in (1.88 m)	215 lb (98 kg)	Jul 10, 2022
Raylen Wilson; LB	Recruit ratings: Rivals: 247Sports: On3: ESPN: (86)				
Monroe Freeling; OT	Mount Pleasant, SC	Oceanside Collegiate Academy	6 ft 7 in (2.01 m)	285 lb (129 kg)	Aug 29, 2022
Monroe Freeling; OT	Recruit ratings: Rivals: 247Sports: On3: ESPN: (84)				
CJ Allen; LB	Barnesville, GA	Lamar County High School	6 ft 1 in (1.85 m)	220 lb (100 kg)	Jun 20, 2022
CJ Allen; LB	Recruit ratings: Rivals: 247Sports: On3: ESPN: (84)				
Gabriel Harris; DE	Valdosta, GA	IMG Academy (FL)	6 ft 4 in (1.93 m)	250 lb (110 kg)	Apr 17, 2022
Gabriel Harris; DE	Recruit ratings: Rivals: 247Sports: On3: ESPN: (84)				
Bo Hughley; OT	Fairburn, GA	Langston Hughes High School	6 ft 7 in (2.01 m)	290 lb (130 kg)	Sep 24, 2021
Bo Hughley; OT	Recruit ratings: Rivals: 247Sports: On3: ESPN: (84)				
Daniel Harris; CB	Miami, FL	Gulliver Prep	6 ft 2 in (1.88 m)	175 lb (79 kg)	Dec 21, 2022
Daniel Harris; CB	Recruit ratings: Rivals: 247Sports: On3: ESPN: (83)				
Tyler Williams; WR	Lakeland, FL	Lakeland High School	6 ft 4 in (1.93 m)	190 lb (86 kg)	Sep 27, 2022
Tyler Williams; WR	Recruit ratings: Rivals: 247Sports: On3: ESPN: (83)				
Pearce Spurlin; TE	Santa Rosa Beach, FL	South Walton High School	6 ft 6 in (1.98 m)	210 lb (95 kg)	Sep 23, 2020
Pearce Spurlin; TE	Recruit ratings: Rivals: 247Sports: On3: ESPN: (83)				
Justyn Rhett; CB	Las Vegas, NV	Bishop Gorman High School	6 ft 1 in (1.85 m)	190 lb (86 kg)	Sep 19, 2022
Justyn Rhett; CB	Recruit ratings: Rivals: 247Sports: On3: ESPN: (82)				
Chris Peal; CB	Charlotte, NC	Providence Day School	6 ft 0 in (1.83 m)	175 lb (79 kg)	Oct 23, 2022
Chris Peal; CB	Recruit ratings: Rivals: 247Sports: On3: ESPN: (82)				
Lawson Luckie; TE	Norcross, GA	Norcross High School	6 ft 3 in (1.91 m)	220 lb (100 kg)	Nov 12, 2022
Lawson Luckie; TE	Recruit ratings: Rivals: 247Sports: On3: ESPN: (81)				
Jordan Hall; DT	Jacksonville, FL	Westside High School	6 ft 4 in (1.93 m)	300 lb (140 kg)	Dec 22, 2022
Jordan Hall; DT	Recruit ratings: Rivals: 247Sports: On3: ESPN: (81)				
Kelton Smith; OT	Columbus, GA	Carver High School	6 ft 5 in (1.96 m)	300 lb (140 kg)	Jul 22, 2022
Kelton Smith; OT	Recruit ratings: Rivals: 247Sports: On3: ESPN: (81)				
Roderick Robinson II; RB	San Diego, CA	Abraham Lincoln High School	6 ft 1 in (1.85 m)	240 lb (110 kg)	Oct 10, 2022
Roderick Robinson II; RB	Recruit ratings: Rivals: 247Sports: On3: ESPN: (81)				
Anthony Evans III; WR	Converse, TX	Judson High School	5 ft 11 in (1.80 m)	170 lb (77 kg)	Nov 25, 2022
Anthony Evans III; WR	Recruit ratings: Rivals: 247Sports: On3: ESPN: (80)				
Joshua Miller; OG	Colonial Heights, VA	Life Christian Academy	6 ft 4 in (1.93 m)	320 lb (150 kg)	Jun 13, 2022
Joshua Miller; OG	Recruit ratings: Rivals: 247Sports: On3: ESPN: (79)				
Jamal Meriweather; OT	Brunswick, GA	Brunswick High School	6 ft 6 in (1.98 m)	270 lb (120 kg)	Dec 5, 2022
Jamal Meriweather; OT	Recruit ratings: Rivals: 247Sports: On3: ESPN: (79)				
Jamaal Jarrett; DT	Greensboro, NC	Grimsley High School	6 ft 5 in (1.96 m)	305 lb (138 kg)	Jul 19, 2022
Jamaal Jarrett; DT	Recruit ratings: Rivals: 247Sports: On3: ESPN: (79)				
Kyron Jones; ATH	Charlotte, NC	Charlotte Christian School	6 ft 0 in (1.83 m)	200 lb (91 kg)	Aug 22, 2022
Kyron Jones; ATH	Recruit ratings: Rivals: 247Sports: On3: ESPN: (79)				
Yazeed Haynes; WR	Lansdale, PA	North Penn High School	6 ft 1 in (1.85 m)	170 lb (77 kg)	Jul 27, 2022
Yazeed Haynes; WR	Recruit ratings: Rivals: 247Sports: On3: ESPN: (78)				
Peyton Woodring; PK	Donalsonville, LA	Ascension Catholic School	5 ft 10 in (1.78 m)	170 lb (77 kg)	Jun 18, 2022
Peyton Woodring; PK	Recruit ratings: Rivals: 247Sports: On3: ESPN: (77)				
Overall recruit ranking: Rivals: 2 247Sports: 2 On3: 2 ESPN: 2
‡ Refers to 40-yard dash; Note: In many cases, Scout, Rivals, 247Sports, On3, and ESPN may conflict in their listings of height, weight and 40 time.; In these cases, the average was taken. ESPN grades are on a 100-point scale.; Sources: "Rivals commits". Rivals.; "ESPN commits". ESPN.; "2023 Team Ranking". Rivals.com.; "247Sports commits". 247Sports.

*= 247Sports Composite rating; ratings are out of 1.00. (five stars= 1.00–.98, four stars= .97–.90, three stars= .80–.89, two stars= .79–.70, no stars= <70)
†= Despite being rated as a four and five star recruit by ESPN, On3.com, Rivals.com and 247Sports.com, TBD received a four-five star 247Sports Composite rating.
Δ= Left the Georgia program following signing but prior to the 2023 season.

2023 Overall class rankings

Website	National rank	Conference rank	5 star recruits	4 star recruits	3 star recruits	2 star recruits	1 star recruits	No star ranking
ESPN	#2	#2	0	20	6	0	0	0
On3 Recruits	#2	#2	2	19	5	0	0	0
Rivals	#2	#2	1	21	4	0	0	0
247 Sports	#2	#2	2	22	4	0	0	0

==== 2024 recruiting class ====
College recruiting (2024)
Name	Hometown	School	Height	Weight	Commit date
Ellis Robinson IV; CB	New Haven, CT	IMG Academy (FL)	6 ft 1 in (1.85 m)	180 lb (82 kg)	Feb 1, 2023
Ellis Robinson IV; CB	Recruit ratings: Rivals: 247Sports: On3: ESPN: (91)				
Ny Carr; WR	Moultrie, GA	Colquitt County High School	6 ft 0 in (1.83 m)	175 lb (79 kg)	Jul 5, 2022
Ny Carr; WR	Recruit ratings: Rivals: 247Sports: On3: ESPN: (86)				
Demarcus Riddick; LB	Clanton, AL	Chilton County High School	6 ft 3 in (1.91 m)	215 lb (98 kg)	Nov 4, 2022
Demarcus Riddick; LB	Recruit ratings: Rivals: 247Sports: On3: ESPN: (86)				
Jaylen Heyward; S	Rockledge, FL	Rockledge High School	6 ft 0 in (1.83 m)	180 lb (82 kg)	Jan 13, 2023
Jaylen Heyward; S	Recruit ratings: Rivals: 247Sports: On3: ESPN: (86)				
Dwight Phillips Jr. ATH	Mableton, GA	Pebblebrook High School	5 ft 11 in (1.80 m)	175 lb (79 kg)	Jan 28, 2023
Dwight Phillips Jr. ATH	Recruit ratings: Rivals: 247Sports: On3: ESPN: (85)				
Ryan Puglisi; QB	Avon, CT	Avon Old Farms School for Boys	6 ft 3 in (1.91 m)	205 lb (93 kg)	Oct 16, 2022
Ryan Puglisi; QB	Recruit ratings: Rivals: 247Sports: On3: ESPN: (85)				
Demello Jones; ATH	Swainsboro, GA	Swainsboro High School	6 ft 0 in (1.83 m)	185 lb (84 kg)	Mar 17, 2023
Demello Jones; ATH	Recruit ratings: Rivals: 247Sports: On3: ESPN: (83)				
NiTareon Tuggle; WR	South Bend, IN	IMG Academy (FL)	6 ft 2 in (1.88 m)	195 lb (88 kg)	Apr 11, 2023
NiTareon Tuggle; WR	Recruit ratings: Rivals: 247Sports: On3: ESPN: (80)				
Malachi Toliver; OT	Cartersville, GA	Cartersville High School	6 ft 6 in (1.98 m)	310 lb (140 kg)	Mar 26, 2023
Malachi Toliver; OT	Recruit ratings: Rivals: 247Sports: On3: ESPN: (79)				
Sacovie White; WR	Cartersville, GA	Cass High School	5 ft 10 in (1.78 m)	175 lb (79 kg)	Oct 10, 2022
Sacovie White; WR	Recruit ratings: Rivals: 247Sports: On3: ESPN: (78)				
Overall recruit ranking:
‡ Refers to 40-yard dash; Note: In many cases, Scout, Rivals, 247Sports, On3, and ESPN may conflict in their listings of height, weight and 40 time.; In these cases, the average was taken. ESPN grades are on a 100-point scale.; Sources: "Rivals commits". Rivals.; "ESPN commits". ESPN.; "2024 Team Ranking". Rivals.com.; "247Sports commits". 247Sports.

2024 overall class rankings

Website	National rank	Conference rank	5 star recruits	4 star recruits	3 star recruits	2 star recruits	1 star recruits	No star ranking
ESPN	--	--	0	7	0	0	0	0
On3 Recruits	--	--	0	7	1	0	0	
Rivals	--	--	0	7	0	0	0	
247 Sports	--	--	0	7	0	0	0	

== Preseason ==
=== Spring game ===
The Bulldogs held spring practices in March and April 2023, with the Georgia football spring game "G-Day" taking place in Athens, GA on April 15, 2023.

2023 G-Day Spring Game

Quarter	1	2	3	4	Total
UGA Red	14	10	0	7	31
UGA Black	3	16	0	7	26

at Sanford Stadium, Athens, GA

- Date: April 15, 2023
- Game time: 2:00 pm EDT

=== Award watch lists ===
Listed in the order that they were released

Award	Player	Position	Year	Source
Lott Trophy	Malaki Starks	S	So.	
Maxwell Award	Brock Bowers	TE	So.	
John Mackey Award	Oscar Delp	TE	So.	
John Mackey Award	Brock Bowers	TE	So.	
Bronko Nagurski Trophy	Malakai Starks	S	So.	
Bronko Nagurski Trophy	Mykel Williams	DL	So.	
Bronko Nagurski Trophy	Jamon Dumas-Johnson	LB	JR	
Outland Trophy	Sedrick Van Pran-Granger	OL	JR	
Outland Trophy	Tate Ratledge	OL	JR	
Outland Trophy	Nazir Stackhouse	DL	SR	
Ray Guy Award	Brett Thorson	P	SO	
Rimington Trophy	Sedrick Van Pran-Granger	C	RS-JR	
Wuerffel Trophy	Ladd McConkey	WR	JR	
Biletnikoff Award	Brock Bowers	TE	So.	
Biletnikoff Award	Dominic Lovett	WR	So.	
Biletnikoff Award	Ladd McConkey	WR	Jr.	
Butkus Award				
Jim Thorpe Award				
Walter Camp Award				
Bednarik Award				
Rotary Lombardi Award				
Earl Campbell Tyler Rose Award				
Polynesian College Football Player Of The Year Award				
Manning Award				
Johnny Unitas Golden Arm Award				
Ted Hendricks Award				

=== SEC media days ===
The 2023 SEC Media days were held in July 2023 at TBD. The Preseason Polls were released July 2023. Each team had their head coach available to talk to the media at the event. Coverage of the event was televised on SEC Network and ESPN.

Media poll (East Division)
Predicted finish	Team	Votes (1st place)
1	Georgia	(265) 2011
2	Tennessee	(14) 1682
3	South Carolina	(3) 1254
4	Kentucky	1204
5	Florida	911
6	Missouri	658
7	Vanderbilt	(8) 428

Media poll (SEC Championship)
Rank	Team	Votes
1	Georgia	181
2	Alabama	62
3	LSU	31

=== Preseason All-SEC teams and All-American honors ===
==== Media ====
First Team

Position	Player	Class	Team
Offense
QB			Georgia
RB			Georgia
WR			Georgia
OL			Georgia
Defense
LB			Georgia
LB			Georgia
DB			Georgia
DB			Georgia
Special teams
PK			Georgia
RB			Georgia

Second Team

Position	Player	Class	Team
Offense
QB			Georgia
RB			Georgia
WR			Georgia
OL			Georgia
Defense
LB			Georgia
LB			Georgia
DB			Georgia
DB			Georgia
Special teams
PK			Georgia

Third Team

Position	Player	Class	Team
Offense
QB			Georgia
RB			Georgia
WR			Georgia
OL			Georgia
Defense
LB			Georgia
LB			Georgia
DB			Georgia
DB			Georgia
Special teams
PK			Georgia

==== Coaches ====
First Team

Position	Player	Class	Team
Offense
QB			Georgia
RB			Georgia
WR			Georgia
OL			Georgia
Defense
LB			Georgia
LB			Georgia
DB			Georgia
DB			Georgia
Special teams
PK			Georgia

Second Team

Position	Player	Class	Team
Offense
QB			Georgia
RB			Georgia
WR			Georgia
OL			Georgia
Defense
LB			Georgia
LB			Georgia
DB			Georgia
DB			Georgia
Special teams
PK			Georgia

Third Team

Position	Player	Class	Team
Offense
QB			Georgia
RB			Georgia
WR			Georgia
OL			Georgia
Defense
LB			Georgia
LB			Georgia
DB			Georgia
DB			Georgia
Special teams
PK			Georgia

Pre-season All-American Honors
Player	Position	AP	CBS Sports	ESPN	Sporting News	WCFF	Designation
							Unanimous

Second Team All-Americans
Player	No.	Position	Class	Selector(s)	Source(s)

== Schedule ==
Date	Time	Opponent	Rank	Site	TV	Result	Attendance
September 2	6:00 p.m.	UT Martin*	No. 1	Sanford Stadium; Athens, GA	SECN+, ESPN+	W 48–7	92,746
September 9	12:00 p.m.	Ball State*	No. 1	Sanford Stadium; Athens, GA	SECN	W 45–3	92,746
September 16	3:30 p.m.	South Carolina	No. 1	Sanford Stadium; Athens, GA (rivalry)	CBS	W 24–14	92,746
September 23	7:30 p.m.	UAB*	No. 1	Sanford Stadium; Athens, GA	ESPN2	W 49–21	92,746
September 30	3:30 p.m.	at Auburn	No. 1	Jordan-Hare Stadium; Auburn, AL (Deep South's Oldest Rivalry)	CBS	W 27–20	88,043
October 7	7:00 p.m.	No. 20 Kentucky	No. 1	Sanford Stadium; Athens, GA (SEC Nation)	ESPN	W 51–13	92,746
October 14	12:00 p.m.	at Vanderbilt	No. 1	FirstBank Stadium; Nashville, TN (rivalry)	CBS	W 37–20	28,500
October 28	3:30 p.m.	vs. Florida	No. 1	EverBank Stadium; Jacksonville, FL (rivalry, SEC Nation)	CBS	W 43–20	76,251
November 4	3:30 p.m.	No. 12 Missouri^{†}	No. 2	Sanford Stadium; Athens, GA	CBS	W 30–21	92,746
November 11	7:00 p.m.	No. 9 Ole Miss	No. 2	Sanford Stadium; Athens, GA (College GameDay)	ESPN	W 52–17	92,746
November 18	3:30 p.m.	at No. 18 Tennessee	No. 1	Neyland Stadium; Knoxville, TN (rivalry, SEC Nation)	CBS	W 38–10	101,915
November 25	7:30 p.m.	at Georgia Tech*	No. 1	Bobby Dodd Stadium; Atlanta, GA (Clean, Old-Fashioned Hate)	ABC	W 31–23	51,447
December 2	4:00 p.m.	vs. No. 8 Alabama	No. 1	Mercedes-Benz Stadium; Atlanta, GA (SEC Championship Game, rivalry, College Gameday, SEC Nation)	CBS	L 24–27	78,320
December 30	4:00 p.m.	vs. No. 5 Florida State*	No. 6	Hard Rock Stadium; Miami Gardens, FL (Orange Bowl)	ESPN	W 63–3	63,324
*Non-conference game; ^{†}Homecoming; Rankings from AP Poll (and CFP Rankings, after October 31) - Released prior to game; All times are in Eastern time

== Personnel ==
=== Coaching staff ===
Name	Position	Consecutive season at Georgia in current position
Kirby Smart	Head coach	8th
Mike Bobo	Offensive coordinator	1st
Stacy Searels	Offensive line coach	2nd
Scott Cochran	Special teams coordinator	4th
Will Muschamp	Defensive coordinator/Safeties coach	2nd
Glenn Schumann	Co-defensive coordinator/Inside linebackers coach	5th
Chidera Uzo-Diribe	Outside linebackers coach	2nd
Bryan McClendon	Pass Game coordinator/Wide receivers coach	2nd
Dell McGee	Run Game coordinator/Running backs coach	4th
Todd Hartley	Tight ends coach	5th
Tray Scott	Defensive line coach	7th
Fran Brown	Defensive back coach	2nd
Scott Sinclair	Strength and conditioning coach	3rd

==== Support staff ====
- Eric Black – Director of Football Creative – Football
- Mike Cavan – Director of football administration
- Austin Chambers – Assistant director of player development
- Jay Chapman – Director of Football Management
- David Cooper – Director of Recruiting Relations
- Anna Courson - Football Operations Assistant
- Chandler Eldridge – Co-director of Football Creative – Design
- Hunter Parker - Football Operations Assistant
- Bryant Gantt – Director of Player Support and operations
- Matt Godwin - Player Personnel Coordinator
- Christina Harris – Director of Recruiting Administration
- Hailey Hughes - Football Operations Coordinator
- Ann Hunt – Administrative assistant to Head Coach
- Jonas Jennings – Director of player development
- Angela Kirkpatrick - On Campus Recruiting Coordinator
- Jeremy Klawsky – Director of Football Technology
- Collier Madaleno – Director of football performance Nutrition
- John Meshad – Director of Equipment Operations
- Chad Morehead – Co-director of Football Creative Design
- Neyland Raper – Assistant director of football operations & Recruiting
- Logen Reed – Assistant recruiting coordinator
- Maurice Sims – Associate director of strength and conditioning
- Juwan Taylor - Player Development Assistant
- Meaghan Turcotte – Assistant director of football performance Nutrition
- Tersoo Uhaa – Assistant Strength and Conditioning Coach
- Gage Whitten – Director of Football Equipment and Apparel

==== Graduate assistants ====
- Garrett Murphy – Defensive assistant
- Stephon Parker Jr- Offensive Assistant
- Adam Ray – Special teams Assistant
- Jacob Russell – Offensive assistant
- Rashawn Scott - Offensive assistant

==== Analysts ====
- Kirk Benedict
- Davis Merritt
- Montgomery VanGorder
- Darrell Dickey
- Brandon Streeter

=== Roster ===
2023 Georgia Bulldogs football team roster
Players
Coaches
Offense

Pos.	#	Name	Class
RB	0	Roderick Robinson II	Fr
WR	1	Marcus Rosemy-Jacksaint	Sr
RB	2	Kendall Milton	Sr
RB	3	Andrew Paul	Fr
TE	4	Oscar Delp	So
WR	5	RaRa Thomas	Fr
WR	6	Dominic Lovett	Jr
TE	7	Lawson Luckie	Fr
WR	9	Jackson Meeks	Jr
WR	10	Tyler Williams	Fr
WR	11	Arian Smith	Jr
QB	12	Brock Vandagriff	So
WR	13	Zeed Haynes	Fr
QB	14	Gunner Stockton	Fr
QB	15	Carson Beck	Jr
QB	16	Jackson Muschamp	Jr
WR	17	Anthony Evans III	Fr
WR	18	C. J. Smith	Fr
TE	19	Brock Bowers	Jr
RB	20	Sevaughn Clark	Sr
RB	22	Branson Robinson	So
WR	23	De'Nylon Morrissette	So
QB	26	Collin Drake	So
WR	29	Luke Bennett	Fr
RB	30	Daijun Edwards	Sr
WR	31	Grant Briscoe	Fr
RB	32	Cash Jones	So
WR	37	Izayah Reeves	So
WR	38	Brooks Bortle	Fr
WR	39	Parker Jones	Fr
WR	39	Miles Thornton	Fr
TE	44	Cade Brock	Jr
RB	45	Jacob Hardie	Fr
WR	46	George Vining	Sr
TE	48	Cooper Johnson	Fr
OL	53	Dylan Fairchild	So
OL	55	Jared Wilson	So
OL	56	Micah Morris	So
OL	57	Monroe Freeling	Fr
OL	58	Austin Blaske	Jr
OL	63	Sedrick Van Pran-Granger	Jr
OL	65	Amarius Mims	Jr
OL	66	Aliou Bah	Fr
OL	68	Chris Brown	Jr
OL	69	Tate Ratledge	Jr
OL	70	Joshua Miller	Fr
OL	71	Earnest Greene III	Fr
OL	73	Xavier Truss	Sr
OL	74	Drew Bobo	Fr
OL	76	Miles Johnson	Jr
OL	78	Chad Lindberg	Jr
WR	80	Brandon Moody	Jr
TE	81	David Lalaian	Fr
WR	82	Logan Johnson	So
WR	83	Cole Speer	So
WR	84	Ladd McConkey	Jr
WR	86	Dillon Bell	So
WR	87	Mekhi Mews	So
TE	88	Pearce Spurlin	Fr
WR	89	Braxton Hicks	Jr

Defense }

Pos.	#	Name	Class
ILB	0	Troy Bowles	Fr
DB	1	Nyland Green	So
ILB	2	Smael Mondon Jr.	Jr
DB	3	Kamari Lassiter	Jr
DB	4	A. J. Harris	Fr
ILB	5	Raylen Wilson	Fr
DB	6	Daylen Everette	So
OLB	7	Marvin Jones Jr.	So
DB	8	Joenel Aguero	Fr
DB	9	Justyn Rhett	Fr
ILB	10	Jamon Dumas-Johnson	Jr
ILB	11	Jalon Walker	So
DB	12	Julian Humphrey	Fr
DL	13	Mykel Williams	So
DB	14	David Daniel-Sisavanh	Jr
DE	16	C. J. Madden	Fr
DB	17	Dan Jackson	Sr
LB	18	Xavian Sorey Jr.	So
OLB	19	Darris Smith	So
DB	20	JaCorey Thomas	So
DB	22	Javon Bullard	Jr
DB	23	Tykee Smith	Sr
DB	24	Malaki Starks	So
ILB	25	E. J. Lightsey	Fr
OLB	26	Samuel M'Pemba	Fr
DB	27	Chris Peal	Fr
OLB	29	Gabe Harris Jr.	Fr
ILB	30	Terrell Foster	Fr
DB	31	Kyron Jones	Fr
OLB	32	Chaz Chambliss	Jr
ILB	33	CJ Allen	Fr
S	35	Jacob Fleming	Fr
DB	36	Colby Smith	Jr
DB	38	Patrick Taylor	Jr
DB	39	Collin Lark	Jr
DE	41	Denton Shamburger	Fr
ILB	42	Graham Collins	Jr
DL	44	Jordan Hall	Fr
OLB	47	Sam Shurtleff	Jr
DB	48	Joseph Daniels	GS
DB	49	Jamier Moten	Fr
DL	52	Christen Miller	Fr
DL	55	Jamaal Jarrett	Fr
LB	57	Luke Collins	So
DL	78	Nazir Stackhouse	Sr
DL	90	Tramel Walthour	Sr
DL	93	Tyrion Ingram-Dawkins	So
DL	94	Jonathan Jefferson	So
DL	96	Zion Logue	Sr
DL	97	Warren Brinson	Sr

Special teams

Pos.	#	Name	Class
LS	51	Will Snellings	Fr
LS	56	William Mote	Sr
LS	66	Jonathan Washburn	So
K	91	Peyton Woodring	Fr
K	92	Liam Badger	So
P	92	Brett Thorson	So
K	94	Henry Bates	Fr
P	98	Noah Jones	So
K	99	Jared Zirkel	Jr

Head coach

- Kirby Smart

Coordinators/assistant coaches

- Mike Bobo – Offensive coordinator/Quarterbacks
- Will Muschamp – Defensive coordinator
- Glenn Schumann – Defensive coordinator/Inside linebackers
- Scott Cochran – Special teams coordinator
- Dell McGee – Run game coordinator/Running backs
- Bryan McClendon – Passing game coordinator/Wide receivers
- Tray Scott – Defensive line/Assistant head coach
- Stacy Searels – Offensive linemen
- Todd Hartley – Tight ends/Assistant head coach
- Fran Brown – Defensive backs
- Chidera Uzo-Diribe – Outside linebackers
- Scott Sinclair – Director, Strength and Conditioning
- Jordan Barber – Assistant, Strength and Conditioning
- Lonnie Brown – Assistant, Strength and Conditioning
- Markell Clark – Assistant, Strength and Conditioning
- K. J. Florence – Assistant, Strength and Conditioning
- Jes Sutherland – Quality Control, Offense
- Montgomery Vangorder – Quality Control, Offense
- Adam Ray – Quality Control, Special Teams
- Neyland Raper – Director, Football Operations
- Hunter Parker – Assistant, Football Operations
- Anna Courson – Assistant, Football Operations
- Michael Cogan – Assistant, Football Operations
- Jonas Jennings – Director, Player Development
- Juwan Taylor – Assistant, Player Development
- Austin Chambers – Assistant, Player Development
- LeJacque Martin – Assistant, Player Development

Legend

- (C) Team captain
- (S) Suspended
- (I) Ineligible
- Injured
- Redshirt

Roster
Last update: 6/27/23

=== Depth chart ===
Defense
4-3

FS
Malaki Starks
Dan Jackson
Justyn Rhett

Star	ILB	ILB	OLB
Tykee Smith	Smael Mondon; C.J. Allen	Jamon Dumas-Johnson	Chaz Chambliss
Joenel Aguero	Xavian Sorey	Jalon Walker	Marvin Jones Jr.
Kyron Jones	Rayland Wilson	Troy Bowles	Gabe Harris Jr. Sam M'Pemba; Damon Wilson

SS
Javon Bullard
David Daniel-Sisavanh
Jacorey Thomas

CB
Daylen Everette
Julian Humphrey
Daniel Harris

DE	NT	DE
Mykel Williams	Zion Logue; Warren Brinson	Nazir Stackhouse
Tramel Walthour	Jordan Hall	Christen Miller
Tyrion Ingram-Dawkins	Jonathan Jefferson	Jamaal Jarrett

CB
Kamari Lassiter
Nyland Green
AJ Harris

Offense
Pro Spread

WR
Marcus Rosemy-Jacksaint
Dillon Bell
Jackson Meeks

WR
Ladd McConkey
Arian Smith
C. J. Smith

LT	LG	C	RG	RT
Earnest Greene	Xavier Truss	Sedrick Van Pran-Granger	Tate Ratledge	Amarius Mims
Austin Blaske	Micah Morris	Jared Wilson	Dylan Fairchild	Chad Lindberg
Monroe Freeling	Joshua Miller	Austin Blaske	Aliou Bah	Bo Hughley; OR Jamal Meriweather

TE
Brock Bowers
Oscar Delp
Lawson Luckie

WR
Dominic Lovett
RaRa Thomas
Mekhi Mews

QB
Carson Beck
Brock Vandagriff
Gunner Stockton

Key reserves
Offense
Defense
Special teams
Out (indefinitely)
Out (season)
Out (suspended)
Out (retired)

RB
Daijun Edwards
OR Kendall Milton
Cash Jones
Roderick Robinson II

Special teams
PK Peyton Woodring
PK Jared Zirkel
P Brett Thorson
P Noah Jones
KR -
PR -
LS -
H -

True Freshman

=== Injury report ===
Name	Position	Injury	Duration
-	-	-	-

== Game summaries ==
=== vs UT Martin (FCS) ===
Game One – UT Martin Skyhawks (FCS) (0-0) at No. 1 Georgia Bulldogs (0-0) – Game summary

Quarter	1	2	3	4	Total
UT Martin (FCS)	0	0	0	7	7
No. 1 Georgia	7	10	14	17	48

at Sanford Stadium • Athens, Georgia

- Date: Saturday, September 2, 2023
- Game time: 6:00 p.m. EST
- Game weather: -
- Game attendance: 92,756
- Referee: Kyle Olson
- TV announcers (SEC Network+): Clay Matvick (play-by-play), Aaron Murray (color) and Ashley ShahAhmadi (sideline)

Game information

First quarter

- (3:40) UGA – Brock Bowers 3-yard run (Peyton Woodring kick) (Drive: 10 plays, 76 yards, 4:39; Georgia 7–0)

Second quarter

- (4:29) UGA – Carson Beck 4-yard run (Peyton Woodring kick) (Drive: 7 plays, 68 yards, 2:43; Georgia 14–0)
- (0:03) UGA – Peyton Woodring 23-yard field goal (Drive: 12 plays, 75 yards, 2:14; Georgia 17–0)

Third quarter

- (8:29) UGA – Mekhi Mews 54-yard pass from Carson Beck (Peyton Woodring kick) (Drive: 6 plays, 98 yards, 2:32; Georgia 24-0)
- (5:35) UGA – Roderick Robinson II 2-yard run (Peyton Woodring kick) (Drive: 5 plays, 80 yards, 1:54; Georgia 31–0)

Fourth quarter

- (11:36) UGA – Oscar Delp 21-yard pass from Brock Vandagriff (Peyton Woodring kick) (Drive: 2 plays, 77 yards, 0:37; Georgia 38–0)
- (6:39) UTM – Trevonte Rucker 9-yard pass from Kinkead Dent (Aidan Laros kick) (Drive: 12 plays, 75 yards, 4:57; Georgia 38–7)
- (2:09) UGA – Peyton Woodring 33-yard field goal (Drive: 10 plays, 60 yards, 4:30; Georgia 41–7)
- (1:59) UGA – Kyron Jones 26-yard interception return (Peyton Woodring kick) (Georgia 48–7)

Statistics	UTM	UGA
First downs	15	28
Total yards	62–262	69–559
Rushing yards	29–134	30–159
Passing yards	128	400
Passing: Comp–Att–Int	18–33–1	26–39–0
Time of possession	29:35	30:25

Team	Category	Player	Statistics
UT Martin	Passing	Kinkead Dent	18/32, 128 yards, TD
UT Martin	Rushing	Kinkead Dent	6 carries, 47 yards
UT Martin	Receiving	Asa Wondeh	4 receptions, 42 yards
Georgia	Passing	Carson Beck	21/31, 294 yards, TD
Georgia	Rushing	Kendall Milton	9 carries, 53 yards
Georgia	Receiving	Brock Bowers	5 receptions, 78 yards

=== vs Ball State ===
Game Two – Ball State Cardinals (0–1) at No. 1 Georgia Bulldogs (1-0) – Game summary

Quarter	1	2	3	4	Total
Ball State	0	0	0	3	3
No. 1 Georgia	0	31	14	0	45

at Sanford Stadium • Athens, Georgia

- Date: Saturday, September 9, 2023
- Game time: 12:00 p.m. EST
- Game weather: -
- Game attendance: 92,756
- Referee: Jason McArthur
- TV announcers (SEC Network): Taylor Zarzour (play-by-play), Matt Stinchcomb (color) and Alyssa Lang (sideline)

Game information

First quarter

no scoring

Second quarter

- (14:32) UGA – Mekhi Mews 69-yard punt return (Peyton Woodring kick) (Georgia 7–0)
- (10:16) UGA – Marcus Rosemy-Jacksaint 7-yard pass from Carson Beck (Peyton Woodring kick) (Drive: 6 plays, 78 yards, 2:25; Georgia 14–0)
- (8:45) UGA – Dillon Bell 21-yard run (Peyton Woodring kick) (Drive: 2 plays, 30 yards, 0:51; Georgia 21–0)
- (1:49) UGA – Peyton Woodring 35-yard field goal (Drive: 12 plays, 42 yards, 5:28; Georgia 24–0)
- (0:37) UGA – Kendall Milton 1-yard run (Peyton Woodring kick) (Drive: 4 plays, 20 yards, 1:04; Georgia 31–0)

Third quarter

- (6:27) UGA – Cash Jones 27-yard pass from Carson Beck (Peyton Woodring kick) (Drive: 8 plays, 80 yards, 4:14; Georgia 38-0)
- (0:46) UGA – Roderick Robinson II 12-yard run (Peyton Woodring kick) (Drive: 3 plays, 67 yards, 1:21; Georgia 45–0)

Fourth quarter

- (9:05) BALL – Jackson Courville 27-yard field goal (Drive: 15 plays, 55 yards, 6:41; Georgia 45–3)

Statistics	BALL	UGA
First downs	13	22
Total yards	65–224	61–386
Rushing yards	28–77	28–99
Passing yards	147	287
Passing: Comp–Att–Int	18–37–3	24–33–1
Time of possession	31:28	28:32

Team	Category	Player	Statistics
Ball State	Passing	Layne Hatcher	10/16, 82 yards
Ball State	Rushing	Charlie Spegal	4 carries, 32 yards
Ball State	Receiving	Ahmad Edwards	4 receptions, 47 yards
Georgia	Passing	Carson Beck	23/30, 283 yards, 2 TD, INT
Georgia	Rushing	Roderick Robinson II	6 carries, 38 yards, TD
Georgia	Receiving	Arian Smith	2 receptions, 50 yards

=== vs South Carolina (rivalry) ===
Game Three – South Carolina Gamecocks (1–1) at No. 1 Georgia Bulldogs (2-0) – Game summary

Quarter	1	2	3	4	Total
South Carolina	7	7	0	0	14
No. 1 Georgia	3	0	14	7	24

at Sanford Stadium • Athens, Georgia

- Date: Saturday, September 16, 2023
- Game time: 3:30 p.m. EST
- Game weather: -
- Game attendance: 92,756
- Referee: Ken Williamson
- TV announcers (CBS): Brad Nessler (play-by-play), Gary Danielson (color) and Jenny Dell (sideline)

Game information

First quarter

- (9:56) SC – Antwane Wells Jr. 17-yard pass from Spencer Rattler (Mitch Jeter kick) (Drive: 10 plays, 65 yards, 5:04; South Carolina 7–0)
- (2:02) UGA – Peyton Woodring 31-yard field goal (Drive: 15 plays, 62 yards, 7:54; South Carolina 7–3)

Second quarter

- (1:00) SC – Dakereon Joyner 2-yard run (Mitch Jeter kick) (Drive: 5 plays, 80 yards, 2:27; South Carolina 14–3)

Third quarter

- (12:20) UGA – Daijun Edwards 7-yard run (Peyton Woodring kick) (Drive: 6 plays, 75 yards, 2:40; South Carolina 14–10)
- (7:40) UGA – Dillon Bell 3-yard run (Peyton Woodring kick) (Drive: 9 plays, 49 yards, 3:20; Georgia 17–14)

Fourth quarter

- (9:10) UGA – Cash Jones 13-yard run (Peyton Woodring kick) (Drive: 8 plays, 61 yards, 3:49; Georgia 24–14)

Statistics	SC	UGA
First downs	17	29
Total yards	58–309	79–459
Rushing yards	16–53	44–190
Passing yards	256	269
Passing: Comp–Att–Int	22–42–2	27–35–0
Time of possession	22:47	37:13

Team	Category	Player	Statistics
South Carolina	Passing	Spencer Rattler	22/42, 256 yards, TD, 2 INT
South Carolina	Rushing	Spencer Rattler	8 carries, 35 yards
South Carolina	Receiving	O'Mega Blake	5 receptions, 86 yards
Georgia	Passing	Carson Beck	27/35, 269 yards
Georgia	Rushing	Daijun Edwards	20 carries, 118 yards, TD
Georgia	Receiving	Marcus Rosemy-Jacksaint	6 receptions, 71 yards

=== vs UAB ===
Game Four – UAB Blazers (1–2) at No. 1 Georgia Bulldogs (3-0) – Game summary

Quarter	1	2	3	4	Total
UAB	0	14	0	7	21
No. 1 Georgia	7	21	14	7	49

at Sanford Stadium • Athens, Georgia

- Date: Saturday, September 23, 2023
- Game time: 7:30 p.m. EST
- Game weather: -
- Game attendance: 92,756
- Referee: David Smith
- TV announcers (ESPN2): Brian Custer (play-by-play), Rod Gilmore (color) and Lauren Sisler (sideline)

Game information

First quarter

- (12:04) UGA – Arian Smith 12-yard pass from Carson Beck (Peyton Woodring kick) (Drive: 6 plays, 75 yards, 2:51; Georgia 7–0)

Second quarter

- (14:09) UAB – Bryce Damous 16-yard pass from Jacob Zeno (Matt Quinn kick) (Drive: 4 plays, 36 yards, 0:52; Tied 7–7)
- (10:00) UGA – Daijun Edwards 4-yard run (Peyton Woodring kick) (Drive: 9 plays, 72 yards, 4:04; Georgia 14–7)
- (2:40) UGA – Brock Bowers 41-yard pass from Carson Beck (Peyton Woodring kick) (Drive: 7 plays, 92 yards, 2:32; Georgia 21–7)
- (1:46) UAB – Daijun Edwards 3-yard run (Peyton Woodring kick) (Drive: 4 plays, 25 yards, 1:02; Georgia 28–7)
- (0:08) UAB – Amare Thomas 2-yard pass from Jacob Zeno (Matt Quinn kick) (Drive: 9 plays, 70 yards, 1:12; Georgia 28–14)

Third quarter

- (9:06) UGA – Carson Beck 1-yard run (Peyton Woodring kick) (Drive: 12 plays, 59 yards, 4:38; Georgia 35–14)
- (5:38) UGA – Brock Bowers 10-yard pass from Carson Beck (Peyton Woodring kick) (Drive: 4 plays, 61 yards, 2:14; Georgia 42–14)

Fourth quarter

- (9:05) UGA – Sevaughn Clark 7-yard run (Peyton Woodring kick) (Drive: 8 plays, 75 yards, 3:44; Georgia 49–14)
- (6:08) UAB – Jacob Zeno 3-yard run (Matt Quinn kick) (Drive: 8 plays, 75 yards, 2:57; Georgia 49–21)

Statistics	UAB	UGA
First downs	20	31
Total yards	77–336	76–582
Rushing yards	26–86	36–188
Passing yards	250	394
Passing: Comp–Att–Int	32–51–1	28–40–1
Time of possession	25:35	34:25

Team	Category	Player	Statistics
UAB	Passing	Jacob Zeno	32/51, 250 yards, 2 TD, INT
UAB	Rushing	Isaiah Jacobs	10 carries, 27 yards
UAB	Receiving	Amare Thomas	9 receptions, 60 yards, TD
Georgia	Passing	Carson Beck	22/32, 338 yards, 3 TD
Georgia	Rushing	Daijun Edwards	12 carries, 66 yards, 2 TD
Georgia	Receiving	Brock Bowers	9 receptions, 121 yards, 2 TD

=== at Auburn (rivalry) ===
Game Five – No. 1 Georgia Bulldogs (4–0) at Auburn Tigers (3-1) – Game summary

Quarter	1	2	3	4	Total
No. 1 Georgia	0	10	7	10	27
Auburn	10	0	7	3	20

at Jordan-Hare Stadium • Auburn, Alabama

- Date: Saturday, September 30, 2023
- Game time: 3:30 p.m. EST
- Game weather: Sunny • Temperature: 86 °F (30 °C) • Wind: E 6 mph
- Game attendance: 88,043
- Referee: Jason Autrey
- TV announcers (CBS): Brad Nessler (play-by-play), Gary Danielson (color) and Jenny Dell (sideline)

Game information

First quarter

- (6:04) AUB – Alex McPherson 27-yard field goal (Drive: 8 plays, 84 yards, 3:50; Auburn 3-0)
- (2:00) AUB – Jarquez Hunter 5-yard run (Alex McPherson kick) (Drive: 7 plays, 48 yards, 3:44; Auburn 10-0)

Second quarter

- (11:50) UGA – Daijun Edwards 2-yard run (Peyton Woodring kick) (Drive: 11 plays, 56 yards, 5:01; Auburn 10-7)
- (5:57) UGA – Peyton Woodring 37-yard field goal (Drive: 10 plays, 61 yards, 3:55; Tied 10-10)

Third quarter

- (13:31) AUB – Robby Ashford 9-yard run (Alex McPherson kick) (Drive: 3 plays, 32 yards, 1:11; Auburn 17-10)
- (1:03) UGA – Daijun Edwards 13-yard run (Peyton Woodring kick) (Drive: 10 plays, 98 yards, 4:24; Tied 17-17)

Fourth quarter

- (10:57) UGA – Peyton Woodring 38-yard field goal (Drive: 7 plays, 71 yards, 3:37; Georgia 20-17)
- (6:21) AUB – Alex McPherson 42-yard field goal (Drive: 9 plays, 51 yards, 4:29; Tied 20-20)
- (2:52) UGA – Brock Bowers 40-yard pass from Carson Beck (Peyton Woodring kick) (Drive: 7 plays, 75 yards, 3:29; Georgia 27-20)

Statistics	UGA	AUB
First downs	19	17
Total yards	63–420	63–307
Rushing yards	30–107	43–219
Passing yards	313	88
Passing: Comp–Att–Int	23–33–1	11–20–1
Time of possession	29:51	30:09

Team	Category	Player	Statistics
Georgia	Passing	Carson Beck	23/33, 313 yards, TD, INT
Georgia	Rushing	Daijun Edwards	19 carries, 76 yards, 2 TD
Georgia	Receiving	Brock Bowers	8 receptions, 157 yards, TD
Auburn	Passing	Payton Thorne	10/19, 82 yards, INT
Auburn	Rushing	Payton Thorne	12 carries, 92 yards
Auburn	Receiving	Rivaldo Fairweather	4 receptions, 44 yards

=== vs No. 20 Kentucky ===
Game Six – No. 20 Kentucky Wildcats (5-0) at No. 1 Georgia Bulldogs (5-0) – Game summary

Quarter	1	2	3	4	Total
No. 20 Kentucky	0	7	6	0	13
No. 1 Georgia	14	20	10	7	51

at Sanford Stadium • Athens, Georgia

- Date: Saturday, October 7, 2023
- Game time: 7:00 p.m. EST
- Game weather: -
- Game attendance: 92,746
- Referee: Kyle Olson
- TV announcers (ESPN): Sean McDonough (play-by-play), Greg McElroy (color) and Molly McGrath (sideline)

Game information

First quarter

- (11:26) UGA – Marcus Rosemy-Jacksaint 40-yard pass from Carson Beck (Peyton Woodring kick) (Drive: 7 plays, 75 yards, 3:34; Georgia 7-0)
- (4:25) UGA – RaRa Thomas 15-yard pass from Carson Beck (Peyton Woodring kick) (Drive: 7 plays, 82 yards, 3:41; Georgia 14-0)

Second quarter

- (11:03) UGA – Oscar Delp 5-yard pass from Carson Beck (Peyton Woodring kick) (Drive: 13 plays, 95 yards, 5:58; Georgia 21-0)
- (6:44) UK – Josh Kattus 4-yard pass from Devin Leary (Alex Raynor kick) (Drive: 10 plays, 75 yards, 4:19; Georgia 21-7)
- (5:15) UGA – Peyton Woodring 36-yard field goal (Drive: 5 plays, 53 yards, 1:29; Georgia 24-7)
- (1:01) UGA – Kendall Milton 5-yard run (Peyton Woodring kick) (Drive: 5 plays, 55 yards, 2:39; Georgia 31-7)
- (0:00) UGA – Peyton Woodring 42-yard field goal (Drive: 3 plays, 38 yards, 0:22; Georgia 34-7)

Third quarter

- (10:34) UK – Ray Davis 26-yard pass from Devin Leary (run failed) (Drive: 2 plays, 28 yards, 0:52; Georgia 34-13)
- (3:27) UGA – Peyton Woodring 32-yard field goal (Drive: 12 plays, 56 yards, 7:07; Georgia 37-13)
- (0:39) UGA – Brock Bowers 21-yard pass from Carson Beck (Peyton Woodring kick) (Drive: 4 plays, 42 yards, 1:19; Georgia 44-13)

Fourth quarter

- (2:38) UGA – Andrew Paul 7-yard pass from Brock Vandagriff (Peyton Woodring kick) (Drive: 12 plays, 92 yards, 6:38; Georgia 51-13)

Statistics	UK	UGA
First downs	12	33
Total yards	50–183	73–608
Rushing yards	24–55	31–173
Passing yards	128	435
Passing: Comp–Att–Int	10–26–0	33–42–1
Time of possession	22:32	37:28

Team	Category	Player	Statistics
Kentucky	Passing	Devin Leary	10/26, 128 yards, 2 TD
Kentucky	Rushing	Ray Davis	15 carries, 59 yards
Kentucky	Receiving	Dane Key	3 receptions, 65 yards
Georgia	Passing	Carson Beck	28/35, 389 yards, 4 TD, INT
Georgia	Rushing	Daijun Edwards	9 carries, 54 yards
Georgia	Receiving	Brock Bowers	7 receptions, 132 yards, TD

=== at Vanderbilt (rivalry) ===
Game Seven – No. 1 Georgia Bulldogs (6–0) at Vanderbilt Commodores (2-5) – Game summary

Quarter	1	2	3	4	Total
No. 1 Georgia	7	17	3	10	37
Vanderbilt	7	0	0	13	20

at FirstBank Stadium • Nashville, Tennessee

- Date: Saturday, October 14, 2023
- Game time: 12:00 p.m. EST
- Game weather: -
- Game attendance: 28,500
- Referee: Lee Hedrick
- TV announcers (CBS): Tom McCarthy (play-by-play), Ross Tucker (analyst), Tiffany Blackmon (sideline)

Game information

First quarter

- (12:07) VAN – London Humphreys 49-yard pass from Ken Seals (Jacob Borcila kick) (Drive: 5 plays, 75 yards, 2:53; Vanderbilt 7-0)
- (5:42) UGA – Carson Beck 1-yard run (Peyton Woodring kick) (Drive: 8 plays, 71 yards, 2:56; Tied 7-7)

Second quarter

- (13:42) UGA – Kendall Milton 3-yard run (Peyton Woodring kick) (Drive: 7 plays, 77 yards, 3:44; Georgia 14-7)
- (3:40) UGA – Peyton Woodring 31-yard field goal (Drive: 16 plays, 55 yards, 7:47; Georgia 17-7)
- (0:12) UGA – Dominic Lovett 4-yard pass from Carson Beck (Peyton Woodring kick) (Drive: 4 plays, 55 yards, 0:25; Georgia 24-7)

Third quarter

- (6:22) UGA – Peyton Woodring 44-yard field goal (Drive: 19 plays, 60 yards, 8:30; Georgia 27-7)

Fourth quarter

- (14:57) VAN – Richie Hoskins 3-yard pass from Ken Seals (Jacob Borcila kick) (Drive: 13 plays, 75 yards, 6:25; Georgia 27-14)
- (9:05) UGA – Peyton Woodring 30-yard field goal (Drive: 12 plays, 66 yards, 5:45; Georgia 30-14)
- (6:14) VAN – Sedrick Alexander 1-yard run (pass failed) (Drive: 1 play, 1 yard, 0:03; Georgia 30-20)
- (3:13) UGA – Daijun Edwards 1-yard run (Peyton Woodring kick) (Drive: 5 plays, 75 yards, 3:01; Georgia 37-20)

Statistics	UGA	VAN
First downs	26	9
Total yards	78–552	47–219
Rushing yards	39–291	15–18
Passing yards	261	201
Passing: Comp–Att–Int	29–39–1	19–29–1
Time of possession	37:19	22:41

Team	Category	Player	Statistics
Georgia	Passing	Carson Beck	29/39, 261 yards, TD, INT
Georgia	Rushing	Daijun Edwards	20 carries, 146 yards, TD
Georgia	Receiving	Dominic Lovett	9 receptions, 72 yards, TD
Vanderbilt	Passing	Ken Seals	19/29, 201 yards, 2 TD, INT
Vanderbilt	Rushing	Sedrick Alexander	6 carries, 16 yards, TD
Vanderbilt	Receiving	Jayden McGowan	5 receptions, 58 yards

=== vs Florida (rivalry) ===
Game Eight – No. 1 Georgia Bulldogs (7-0) vs Florida Gators (5-2) – Game summary

Quarter	1	2	3	4	Total
No. 1 Georgia	10	16	10	7	43
Florida	7	0	0	13	20

at EverBank Stadium • Jacksonville, Florida

- Date: Saturday, October 28, 2023
- Game time: 3:30 p.m. EST
- Game weather: Sunny
- Game attendance: 76,251
- Referee: Matt Loeffler
- TV announcers (CBS): Brad Nessler (play-by-play), Gary Danielson (analyst), Jenny Dell (sideline)

Game information

First quarter

- (11:19) UF - Eugene Wilson III 25-yard pass from Graham Mertz (Trey Smack Kick) (Drive: 7 plays, 66 yards, 3:41: Florida 7-0)
- (6:16) UGA - Peyton Woodring 22-yard field goal (Drive: 11 plays, 71 yards, 5:03; Florida 7-3)
- (1:23) UGA - Ladd McConkey 41-yard pass from Carson Beck (Peyton Woodring kick) (Drive: 5 plays, 66 yards, 1:14: Georgia 10-7)

Second quarter

- (13:25) UGA - Daijun Edwards 20-yard run (Peyton Woodring kick) (Drive: 3 plays, 31 yards, 1:30: Georgia 17-7)
- (10:34) UGA - Daijun Edwards 2-yard run (Peyton Woodring kick) (Drive: 4 plays, 11 yards, 2:06: Georgia 24-7)
- (9:26) UGA - Team Safety (Drive 3 plays, -6 yards, 1:08: Georgia 26-7)

Third quarter

- (7:05) UGA - Peyton Woodring 32-yard field goal (Drive: 5 plays, 58 yards, 2:10: Georgia 29-7)
- (0:18) UGA - Dillon Bell 17-yard pass from Carson Beck (Peyton Woodring kick) (Drive: 6 plays, 76 yards, 2:52: Georgia 36-7)

Fourth quarter

- (12:29) UF - Hayden Hansen 5-yard pass from Graham Mertz (Two-point conversion failed) (Drive: 6 plays, 75 yards, 2:49: Georgia 36-13)
- (5:57) UGA - Kendall Milton 1-yard run (Peyton Woodring kick) (Drive: 10 plays, 75 yards, 6:32: Georgia 43-13)
- (1:20) UF - Graham Mertz 1-yard run (Trey Smack kick) (Drive: 12 plays, 75 yards, 4:37: Georgia 43-20)

Statistics	UGA	FLA
First downs	23	16
Total yards	486	339
Rushing yards	171	109
Passing yards	315	230
Passing: Comp–Att–Int	19-28-0	25–34–0
Time of possession	33:29	26:31

Team	Category	Player	Statistics
Georgia	Passing	Carson Beck	19/28, 315 yards, 2 TD
Georgia	Rushing	Daijun Edwards	15 carries, 96 yards, 2TD
Georgia	Receiving	Ladd McConkey	6 receptions, 135 yards, TD
Florida	Passing	Graham Mertz	25/34, 230 yeards, 2 TD
Florida	Rushing	Montrell Johnson Jr.	9 carries, 82 yards
Florida	Receiving	Ricky Pearsall	6 receptions, 99 yards

=== vs No. 12 Missouri ===
Game Nine – No. 12 Missouri Tigers (7-1) at No. 2 Georgia Bulldogs (8-0) – Game summary

Quarter	1	2	3	4	Total
No. 12 Missouri	7	3	3	8	21
No. 2 Georgia	3	7	14	6	30

at Sanford Stadium • Athens, Georgia

- Date: Saturday, November 4, 2023
- Game time: 3:30 p.m. EST
- Game weather: 75 degrees, sunny, light and variable winds
- Game attendance: 92,746
- Referee: Steve Marlowe
- TV announcers (CBS): Rich Waltz (play-by-play), Aaron Taylor (analyst), Amanda Guerra (sideline)

Game information

First quarter

- (10:17) UGA - Peyton Woodring 33-yard field goal (Drive: 12 plays, 65 yards, 4:40: Georgia 3-0)
- (5:35) MIZZ - Luther Burden III 39-yard pass from Brady Cook (Harrison Mevis kick) (Drive: 9 plays, 75 yards, 4:42: Missouri 7-3)

Second quarter

- (13:38) UGA - Dominic Lovett 6-yard pass from Carson Beck (Peyton Woodring kick) (Drive: 12 plays, 70 yards, 7:07: Georgia 10-7)
- (4:14) MIZZ - Harrison Mevis 37-yeard field goal (Drive: 11 plays, 61 yards, 5:35: Tied 10-10)

Third quarter

- (11:42) MIZZ - Harrison Mevis 42-yard field goal (Drive: 8 plays, 59 yards, 3:12: Missouri 13-10)
- (8:10) UGA - Kendall Milton 15-yard run (Peyton Woodring kick) (Drive: 6 plays, 65 yards, 3:26: Georgia 17-13)
- (0:38) UGA - Oscar Delp 5-yard pass from Carson Beck (Peyton Woodring kick) (Drive: 10 plays, 67 yards, 5:23: Georgia 24-13)

Fourth quarter

- (12:50) MIZZ - Cody Scrader 12-yard run (Brady Cook pass to Luther Burden III for 2-pt conversion)(Drive: 9 plays, 75 yards, 2:48: Georgia 24-21)
- (8:59) UGA - Peyton Woodring 30-yard field goal (Drive: 8 plays, 53 yards, 3:44: Georgia 27-21)
- (3:57) UGA - Peyton Woodring 48-yard field goal (Drive: 7 plays, 40 yards, 3:49: Georgia 30-21)

Statistics	MIZZ	UGA
First downs	21	21
Total yards	363	385
Rushing yards	151	131
Passing yards	212	254
Passing: Comp–Att–Int	14-30-2	21–32–0
Time of possession	25:42	34:18

Team	Category	Player	Statistics
Missouri	Passing	Brady Cook	14/30, 212 yards, TD, 2 INT
Missouri	Rushing	Cody Schrader	22 carries, 112 yards, TD
Missouri	Receiving	Theo Wease Jr.	5 receptions, 90 yards
Georgia	Passing	Carson Beck	21/32, 254 yards, 2 TD
Georgia	Rushing	Daijun Edwards	16 carries, 77 yards
Georgia	Receiving	Ladd McConkey	7 receptions, 95 yards

=== vs No. 9 Ole Miss ===
Game Ten – No. 9 Ole Miss Rebels at No. 2 Georgia Bulldogs – Game summary

Quarter	1	2	3	4	Total
No. 9 Ole Miss	7	7	0	3	17
No. 2 Georgia	14	14	10	14	52

at Sanford Stadium • Athens, Georgia

- Date: Saturday, November 11, 2023
- Game time: 7:00 pm EST
- Game weather: Light Rain • Temperature: 51 °F (11 °C)
- Game attendance: 92,746
- Referee: Jason Autrey
- TV announcers (ESPN): Chris Fowler (play-by-play), Kirk Herbstreit (analyst), Holly Rowe (sideline)

Game information

First quarter

- (10:30) MISS - Quinshon Judkins 15-yard Run (Caden Davis Kick) (Drive: 11 plays, 75 yards, 4:30: Ole Miss 7-0)
- (7:28) UGA - Daijun Edwards 1-yard Run (Peyton Woodring Kick) (Drive: 6 plays, 75 yards, 3:02: Tied 7-7)
- (3:09) UGA - Ladd McConkey 29-yard pass from Carson Beck (Peyton Woodring Kick) (Drive: 3 plays, 60 yards, 1:22: Georgia 14-7)

Second quarter

- (14:16) MISS - Quinshon Judkins 4-yard Run (Caden Davis Kick) (Drive: 9 plays, 75 yards, 3:53: Tied 14-14)
- (9:58) UGA - Daijun Edwards 1-yards Run (Peyton Woodring Kick) (Drive: 8 plays, 75 yards, 4:18: Georgia 21-14)
- (2:27) UGA - Kendall Milton 7-yard Run (Peyton Woodring Kick) (Drive: 9 plays, 62 yards, 5:31: Georgia 28-14)

Third quarter

- (9:15) UGA - Kendall Milton 33-yard Run (Peyton Woodring Kick) (Drive: 4 plays, 75 yards, 1:48: Georgia 35-14)
- (3:50) UGA - Peyton Woodring 27-yard Field Goal (Drive 8 plays, 67 yards, 3:31: Georgia 38-14)

Fourth Quarter

- (14:12) UGA - Brock Bowers 8-yard pass from Carson Beck (Peyton Woodring Kick) ('Drive: 7 plays, 79 yards, 3:26: Georgia 45-14)
- (8:50) MISS - Caden Davis 29-yard Field Goal ('Drive: 13 plays, 63 yards, 5:22: Georgia 45-17)
- (4:12) UGA - Andrew Paul 4 Yd Run (Peyton Woodring Kick) ('Drive: 8 plays, 75 yards, 4:38: Georgia 52-17)

Statistics	MISS	UGA
First downs	18	25
Total yards	352	611
Rushing yards	179	300
Passing yards	173	311
Passing: Comp–Att–Int	14-24-1	19–26–1
Time of possession	29:03	30:57

Team	Category	Player	Statistics
Ole Miss	Passing	Jaxson Dart	10/17, 112 yards, INT
Ole Miss	Rushing	Quinshon Judkins	22 carries, 75 yards, 2 TD
Ole Miss	Receiving	Caden Prieskorn	2 receptions, 48 yards
Georgia	Passing	Carson Beck	18/25, 306 yards, 2TD, INT
Georgia	Rushing	Kendall Milton	9 carries, 127 yards, 2 TD
Georgia	Receiving	Ladd McConkey	4 receptions, 81 yards, TD

=== at No. 18 Tennessee (rivalry) ===
Game Eleven – No. 1 Georgia Bulldogs at No. 18 Tennessee Volunteers – Game summary

Quarter	1	2	3	4	Total
No. 1 Georgia	10	14	14	0	38
No. 18 Tennessee	7	3	0	0	10

at Neyland Stadium • Knoxville, Tennessee

- Date: Saturday, November 18, 2023
- Game time: 3:30 p.m. EST
- Game weather: Sunny • 64 °F (18 °C)
- Game attendance: 101,915
- Referee: Daniel Gautreaux
- TV announcers (CBS): Brad Nessler (play-by-play), Gary Danielson (color), and Jenny Dell (sidelines)

Game information

First Quarter

- (14:49) TENN – Jaylen Wright 75-yard Run (Charles Campbell Kick) (Drive: 1 play, 75 yards, 0:11; Tennessee 7-0)
- (10:01) UGA – Peyton Woodring 42-yard Field Goal (Drive: 11 plays, 51 yards, 4:48; Tennessee 7-3)
- (3:17) UGA – Marcus Rosemy-Jacksaint 18-yard pass from Dillon Bell (Peyton Woodring Kick) (Drive: 9 plays, 65 yards, 4:57; Georgia 10-7)

Second Quarter

- (8:04) UGA – Dillon Bell 9-yard pass from Carson Beck (Peyton Woodring Kick) (Drive: 9 plays, 80 yards, 5:02; Georgia 17-7)
- (1:31) UGA – Brock Bowers 3-yard pass from Carson Beck (Peyton Woodring Kick) (Drive: 8 plays, 71 yards, 4:54; Georgia 24-7)
- (0:00) TENN – Charles Campbell 37-yard Field Goal (Drive: 9 plays, 56 yards, 1:31; Georgia 24-10)

Third Quarter

- (9:24) UGA – Marcus Rosemy-Jacksaint 8-yard pass from Carson Beck (Peyton Woodring Kick) (Drive: 6 plays, 70 yards, 3:53; Georgia 31-10)
- (1:03) UGA – Kendall Milton 15-yard Run (Peyton Woodring Kick) (Drive: 10 plays, 68 yards, 6:27; Georgia 38-10)

Fourth quarter

- no scoring (Georgia 38-10)

Statistics	No. 1 UGA	No. 18 TENN
First downs	27	13
Total yards	472	277
Rushing yards	156	130
Passing yards	316	147
Passing: Comp–Att–Int	25-31-0	17–30–0
Time of possession	40:58	19:02

Team	Category	Player	Statistics
No. 1 Georgia	Passing	Carson Beck	24/30, 298 yards, 3 TD
No. 1 Georgia	Rushing	Kendall Milton	11 carries, 34 yards, 1 TD
No. 1 Georgia	Receiving	Marcus Rosemy-Jacksaint	7 receptions, 91 yards, 2 TD
No. 18 Tennessee	Passing	Joe Milton, III	17/30, 147 yards
No. 18 Tennessee	Rushing	Jaylen Wright	9 carries, 90 yards
No. 18 Tennessee	Receiving	Squirrel White	5 receptions, 45 yards

=== at Georgia Tech (rivalry) ===
Game Twelve– Georgia Bulldogs at Georgia Tech Yellow Jackets – Game summary

Quarter	1	2	3	4	Total
No. 1 Georgia	7	14	10	0	31
Georgia Tech	10	3	0	10	23

at Bobby Dodd Stadium • Atlanta, Georgia

- Date: Saturday, November 25, 2023
- Game time: 7:30 p.m. EST
- Game attendance: 51,447
- Referee: Tim Hedgepath
- TV: ABC

Game information

First quarter

- (11:35) GT – Haynes King 9-yard Run (Aidan Birr Kick) (Drive: 4 plays, 37 yards, 2:07; Georgia Tech 7-0)
- (7:23) UGA – Dominic Lovett 29-yard pass from Carson Beck (Peyton Woodring Kick) (Drive: 9 plays, 83 yards, 4:09; Tied 7-7)
- (0:35) GT – Aidan Birr 25-yard Field Goal (Drive: 11 plays, 67 yards, 6:48; Georgia Tech 10-7)

Second Quarter

- (12:40) UGA – Kendall Milton 3-yard Run (Peyton Woodring Kick) (Drive: 7 plays, 75 yards, 2:55; Georgia 14-10)
- (6:06) GT – Aidan Birr 45-yard Field Goal (Drive: 12 plays, 47 yards, 6:34; Georgia 14-13)
- (1:13) UGA – Daijun Edwards 3-yard Run (Peyton Woodring Kick) (Drive: 11 plays, 64 yards, 4:46; Georgia 21-13)

Third Quarter

- (5:15) UGA – Peyton Woodring 39-yardd Field Goal (Drive: 10 plays, 65 yards, 5:45; Georgia 24-13)
- (0:31) UGA – Kendall Milton 4-yard Run (Peyton Woodring Kick) (Drive: 5 plays, 55 yards, 2:25; Georgia 31-13)

Fourth Quarter

- (12:13) GT – Aidan Birr 40-yard Field Goal (Drive: 6 plays, 52 yards, 3:18; Georgia 31-16)
- (3:46) GT – Haynes King 5-yard Run (Aidan Birr Kick) (Drive: 10 plays, 80 yards, 4:38; Georgia 31-23)

Statistics	UGA	GT
First downs	24	22
Total yards	437	363
Rushing yards	262	205
Passing yards	175	158
Passing: Comp–Att–Int	13-20	11-21
Time of possession	29:15	30:45

Team	Category	Player	Statistics
Georgia	Passing	Carson Beck	13/20, 175 yards, 1 TD, 1 INT
Georgia	Rushing	Kendall Milton	18 carries, 156 yards, 2 TD
Georgia	Receiving	Dominic Lovett	5 receptions, 68 yards, TD
Georgia Tech	Passing	Haynes King	11/20, 158 yards
Georgia Tech	Rushing	Jamal Haynes	15 carries, 81 yards
Georgia Tech	Receiving	Eric Singleton, Jr.	4 receptions, 96 yards

=== vs No. 8 Alabama (SEC Championship) ===
SEC Championship - Georgia Bulldogs (12-0) vs Alabama Crimson Tide (11-1) – Game summary

Quarter	1	2	3	4	Total
No. 1 Georgia	7	0	3	14	24
No. 8 Alabama	3	14	3	7	27

at Mercedes-Benz Stadium • Atlanta, Georgia

- Date: Saturday, December 2, 2023
- Game time: 4:00 pm EST
- Game weather: N/A (Indoor Stadium)
- Game attendance: 78,320
- Referee: Kyle Olson
- TV announcers (CBS): Brad Nessler (Play-by-Play), Gary Danielson (Color Commentator), and Jenny Dell (Sideline Reporter)

Game information

First quarter

- (9:31) UGA – Kendall Milton 17-Yd Run (Peyton Woodring Kick) (Drive: 8 plays, 83 yards, 3:50; Georgia 7-0)
- (3:43) ALA – Will Reichard 43-Yd Field Goal (Drive: 8 plays, 26 yards, 3:48; Georgia 7-3)

Second quarter

- (12:04) ALA – Jam Miller 28-Yd pass from Jalen Milroe (Will Reichard Kick) (Drive: 10 plays, 92 yards, 4:32, Alabama 10-7)
- (0:48) ALA – Jermaine Burton 15-Yd pass from Jalen Milroe (Will Reichard Kick) (Drive: 9 plays, 69 yards, 3:49; Alabama 17-7)

Third Quarter

- (8:51) UGA – Peyton Woodring 34-Yd Field Goal (Drive: 5 plays, 54 yards, 1:45; Alabama 17-10)
- (0:48) ALA – Will Reichard 28-Yd Field Goal (Drive: 4 plays, 1 yard, 1:26; Alabama 20-10)

Fourth quarter

- (10:16) UGA – Carson Beck 1-Yd Run (Peyton Woodring Kick) (Drive: 4 plays, 35 yards, 1:37; Alabama 20-17)
- (5:47) ALA – Roydell Williams 1-Yd Run (Will Reichard Kick) (Drive: 9 plays, 75 yards, 4:29; Alabama 27-17)
- (2:52) UGA – Kendall Milton 1-Yd Run (Peyton Woodring Kick) (Drive: 10 plays, 75 yards, 2:55; Alabama 27-24)

Statistics	UGA	ALA
First downs	19	20
Total yards	60-321	64-306
Rushing yards	31-78	41-114
Passing yards	243	192
Passing: Comp–Att–Int	21-29-0	13–23–0
Time of possession	28:51	31:09

Team	Category	Player	Statistics
Georgia	Passing	Carson Beck	21/29, 243 yards
Georgia	Rushing	Kendall Milton	13 carries, 42 yards, 2 TD
Georgia	Receiving	Brock Bowers	5 receptions, 53 yards
Alabama	Passing	Jalen Milroe	13/23, 192 yards, 2 TD
Alabama	Rushing	Roydell Williams	16 carries, 64 yards, TD
Alabama	Receiving	Isaiah Bond	5 receptions, 79 yards

=== vs No. 5 Florida State (Orange Bowl) ===
Orange Bowl – No. 6 Georgia Bulldogs (12-1, 8-0) vs No. 5 Florida State Seminoles (13-0, 8-0) – Game summary

Quarter	1	2	3	4	Total
No. 6 Georgia	7	35	14	7	63
No. 5 Florida State	0	3	0	0	3

at Hard Rock Stadium • Miami Gardens, Florida

- Date: Saturday, December 30th, 2023
- Game time: 4:00 pm EST
- Game weather: Fair, 70
- Game attendance: 63,324
- Referee: Greg Blum
- TV announcers (ESPN): Joe Tessitore (play-by-play), Jesse Palmer (analyst), and Katie George (sideline)

Game information

First quarter

- (4:05) Kendall Milton 15-Yd Run (Peyton Woodring Kick) (Drive: 7 plays, 69 yards, 2:40; Georgia 7-0)

Second quarter

- (14:57) Kendall Milton 5-Yd Run (Peyton Woodring Kick) (Drive: 6 plays, 82 yards, 1:56; Georgia 14-0)
- (12:34) Ryan Fitzgerald 22-Yd Field Goal (Drive: 6 plays, 71 yards, 2:23; Georgia 14-3)
- (10:38) Daijun Edwards 15-Yd Run (Peyton Woodring Kick) (Drive: 4 plays, 75 yards, 1:56; Georgia 21-3)
- (10:18) Ladd McConkey 27-Yd Run (Peyton Woodring Kick) (Drive: 1 play, 27 yards, 0:20; Georgia 28-3)
- (3:39) Arian Smith 12-Yd pass from Carson Beck (Peyton Woodring Kick) (Drive: 5 plays, 62 yards, 2:20; Georgia 35-3)
- (0:24) Dominic Lovett 2-Yd pass from Carson Beck (Peyton Woodring Kick) (Drive: 3 plays, 51 yards, 0:25; Georgia 42-3)

Third quarter

- (9:23) Daijun Edwards 2-Yd Run (Peyton Woodring Kick) (Drive: 10 plays, 75 yards, 5:37; Georgia 49-3)
- (2:30) Lawson Luckie 4-Yd pass from Gunner Stockton (Peyton Woodring Kick) (Drive: 10 plays, 90 yards, 4:31; Georgia 56-3)

Fourth quarter

- (12:10) Anthony Evans III 14-Yd pass from Gunner Stockton (Peyton Woodring Kick) (Drive: 9 plays, 84 yards, 4:31; Georgia 63-3)

Statistics	No. 6 Georgia	No. 5 Florida State
First downs	36	11
Total yards	673	209
Rushing yards	372	63
Passing yards	301	146
Passing: Comp–Att–Int	20-29-0	10–27–2
Time of possession	35:38	24:22

Team	Category	Player	Statistics
No. 6 Georgia	Passing	Carson Beck	13/18, 203 yds, 2 TD
No. 6 Georgia	Rushing	Kendall Milton	9 carries, 104 yds, 2 TD
No. 6 Georgia	Receiving	Dillon Bell	5 receptions, 86 yds
No. 5 Florida State	Passing	Brock Glenn	9/26, 139 yds, 2 INT
No. 5 Florida State	Rushing	Ja'Khi Douglas	8 carries, 48 yds
No. 5 Florida State	Receiving	Kentrol Pottier	4 receptions, 84 yds

== Statistics ==
=== Team ===
	Georgia	Opp
Scoring	117	24
Points per game		
Points per Turnovers		
First downs		
Rushing		
Passing		
Penalty		
Rushing yards		
Avg per play		
Avg per game		
Rushing touchdowns		
Passing yards		
Att-Comp-Int		
Avg per pass		
Avg per catch		
Avg per game		
Passing touchdowns		
Total offense		
Plays		
Avg per play		
Avg per game		
Fumbles-Lost		
Penalties-Yards		
Avg per game		

	Georgia	Opp
Punt-Yards		
Avg per play		
Avg per punt net		
Punt Return-Yards		
Avg per punt return		
Kickoffs-Yards		
Avg per play		
Avg per kick net		
Kickoff Return-Yards		
Avg per kickoff return		
Interceptions-Yards		
Avg per play		
Time of possession / game		
3rd down conversions (Pct%)	(0%)	(0%)
4th down conversions (Pct%)	(0%)	(0%)
Touchdowns scored		
Field goals-Attempts		
PAT-Attempts		
2 point conversion-attempts		
Sack by Yards		
Misc Yards		
Safeties		
Onside kicks		
Red zone scores	(0%)	(0%)
Red zone touchdowns	(0%)	(0%)
Attendance		
Date/Avg per date		
Neutral Site		

=== Individual leaders ===
Passing statistics
#	NAME	POS	RAT	CMP	ATT	YDS	AVG/G	CMP%	TD	INT	LONG
15	Carson Beck	QB	156.2	71	96	846	282	74.0	3	1	54
12	Brock Vandagriff	QB	235.4	2	5	77	26	40.0	1	0	56
14	Gunner Stockton	QB	112.9	4	6	33	11	66.7	0	0	20
	TOTALS		156.0	77	108	956	319	71.3%	4	1	56

Rushing statistics
#	NAME	POS	ATT	GAIN	AVG	TD	LONG	AVG/G
		RB	0	0 yrds	0.0	0 TDs	0	0.0
	TOTALS		0	0 yrds	0.0	0 TDs	0	0.0

Receiving statistics
#	NAME	POS	CTH	YDS	AVG	TD	LONG	AVG/G
		WR	0	0 yrds	0.0	0 TDs	0	0.0
	TOTALS		67	730 yrds	10.9	10 TDs	38	243.3

==== Defense ====
Defense statistics
#	NAME	POS	SOLO	AST	TOT	TFL-YDS	SACK-YDS	INT-YDS-TD	BU	QBH	RCV-YDS	FF	BLK	SAF
			0	0	0	0-0 yrds	0-0 yrds	-	-	-	-	-	-	-
	TOTAL		0	0	0	0-0 yrds	0-0 yrds	0-0 yrds- 0 TDs	0	0	-	0	0	-

Key: POS: Position, SOLO: Solo Tackles, AST: Assisted Tackles, TOT: Total Tackles, TFL: Tackles-for-loss, SACK: Quarterback Sacks, INT: Interceptions, BU: Passes Broken Up, PD: Passes Defended, QBH: Quarterback Hits, FR: Fumbles Recovered, FF: Forced Fumbles, BLK: Kicks or Punts Blocked, SAF: Safeties, TD : Touchdown

==== Special teams ====
Kicking/off statistics
#	NAME	POS	XPM-XPA (XP%)	FGM-FGA (FG%)	1–19	20–29	30–39	40–49	50+	PTS	LNG	KICKS	YDS	AVG	TB	OB
		PK	0-0 (0.0%)	0-0 (0.0%)	-/-	-/-	-/-	-/-	-/-	0 pts	0	0	0 yrds	0.0	0	-
	TOTALS		0-0 (0.0%)	0-0 (0.0%)	-/-	-/-	-/-	-/-	-/-	0	0	0	0 yrds	0.0	0	-

Punting statistics
#	NAME	POS	PUNTS	YDS	AVG	LONG	TB	FC	I–20	50+	BLK
		P	-	-	-	-	-	-	-	-	-
	Team	--	0	-	-	-	-	-	-	-	0
	TOTALS		0	0 yrds	0.0	0	0	0	0	0	1

Kick return statistics
#	NAME	POS	RTNS	YDS	AVG	TD	LNG
			-	-	-	-	-
	TOTALS		0	0 yrds	0.0	0 TD's	0

Punt return statistics
#	NAME	POS	RTNS	YDS	AVG	TD	LONG
			-	-	-	-	-
	TOTALS		0	0 yrds	0.0	0 TD's	0

==== Scoring ====
Georgia vs Non-Conference Opponents

	1	2	3	4	Total
Georgia	7	41	28	17	93
Opponents	0	0	0	10	10

Georgia vs SEC Opponents

	1	2	3	4	Total
Georgia	3	0	14	7	24
Opponents	7	7	0	0	14

Georgia vs All Opponents

	1	2	3	4	Total
Georgia	10	41	42	24	117
Opponents	7	7	0	10	24

== Awards and SEC honors ==
SEC Weekly Honors
Recipient	Weekly Award	Week #	Date awarded	Ref.

National Weekly Honors
Date	Player	Position	Award	Ref

Southeastern Conference Individual Awards
Recipient	Award	Date awarded	Ref.

Individual Yearly Awards
Recipient	Award	Date awarded	Ref.

=== All-Americans ===
All-SEC
Player	Position	Team
HM = Honorable mention. Source:

All-SEC Freshman
Player	Position
HM = Honorable mention. Source:

All-SEC Academic
Player	Position	Class	Major	Ref.
HM = Honorable mention. Source:

PFF
Player	Position	1st/2nd team
HM = Honorable mention. Source:

CBS Sports / 247Sports
Player	Position	1st/2nd team
HM = Honorable mention. Source:

The Associated Press
Player	Position	1st/2nd team
HM = Honorable mention. Source:

Walter Camp
Player	Position	1st/2nd team
HM = Honorable mention. Source:

NCAA Recognized All-American Honors
Player	AFCA	FWAA	TSN	Designation
The NCAA recognizes a selection to all five of the AFCA, FWAA and TSN first teams for unanimous selections and three of five for consensus selections. HM = Honorable mention. Source:

Other All-American Honors
Player	Athletic	Athlon	BR	CFN	ESPN	FOX Sports	Phil Steele	SI	USA Today

== Postseason ==
=== Bowl games/College Football Playoff ===
==== Senior Bowl ====
Player	#	Position	Class
Marcus Rosemy-Jacksaint	1	WR	
Javon Bullard	22	DB	
Daijun Edwards	23	RB	
Tykee Smith	47	DB	
William Mote	56	LS	
Ladd McConkey	84	WR	

==== East–West Shrine Bowl ====
Player	#	Position	Class
Zion Logue		DL	

=== NFL draft ===
The NFL draft will be held at Campus Martius Park in Detroit, MI.

Bulldogs who were picked in the 2024 NFL draft:

Round	Pick	Player	Position	NFL team
1	13	Brock Bowers	TE	Las Vegas Raiders
1	18	Amarius Mims	OT	Cincinnati Bengals
2	34	Ladd McConkey	WR	Los Angeles Chargers
2	42	Kamari Lassiter	CB	Houston Texans
2	58	Javon Bullard	S	Green Bay Packers
3	89	Tykee Smith	S	Tampa Bay Buccaneers
5	141	Sedrick Van Pran-Granger	C	Buffalo Bills
6	197	Zion Logue	DT	Atlanta Falcons

==== NFL Draft combine ====
11 members of the 2023 team were invited to participate in drills at the 2024 NFL Combine.

2024 NFL Combine Participants
Name	POS	HT	WT	Arms	Hands	40	Bench Press	Vert Jump	Broad Jump	3 Cone Drill	20-yd Shuttle	60-yd Shuttle	Ref
Brock Bowers	TE	6 ft 3 1/8 in (1.91 m)	243 lb (110 kg)	32 3/4 in (0.83 m)	9 3/4 in (0.25 m)								
Javon Bullard	S	5 ft 10 1/2 in (1.79 m)	198 lb (90 kg)	30 3/4 in (0.78 m)	9 in (0.25 m)	4.47 s							
Daijun Edwards	RB	5 ft 9 5/8 in (1.77 m)	207 lb (94 kg)	29 3/4 in (0.76 m)	9 1/2 in (0.24 m)				9 ft 6 in				
Kamari Lassiter	CB	5 ft 11 1/2 in (1.82 m)	186 lb (84 kg)	30 7/8 in (0.78 m)	8 7/8 in (0.23 m)					6.62 s	4.12 s		
Zion Logue	DT												
Ladd McConkey	WR												
Kendall Milton	RB												
Amarius Mims	OT												
Sedrick Van Pran-Granger	C												
Marcus Rosemy-Jacksaint	WR												
Tykee Smith	S												

==== Georgia Pro Day ====
2024 Georgia Pro Day
Name	POS	HT	WT	Arms	Hands	40	Bench press	Vert jump	Broad jump	3-cone drill	20-yd shuttle	60-yd shuttle	Ref

† Top performer

DNP = Did not participate

== Media affiliates ==
=== Radio ===
- Athens - WNGC-FM (106.1), WRFC-AM (960), WTSH-FM (107.1)
- Atlanta - WSB-AM (750) and WSBB-FM (95.5)
- Nationwide (ESPN Radio, Dish Network, SiriusXM, Varsity Network and iHeartRadio)

=== TV ===
- CBS Family – WANF (CBS), CBS Sports Network
- ESPN/ABC Family – WSB-TV (ABC), ABC, ESPN, ESPN2, ESPNU, ESPN+, SEC Network
- FOX Family – Fox 5 Atlanta (FOX), FOX/FS1, FSN
- NBC Family – WXIA-TV/WATL (NBC), NBC Sports, NBCSN
- PBS - WGTV/WABE-TV
- Peachtree TV - WPCH-TV
- Univision - WUVG-DT (Spanish)
- Telemundo - WKTB-CD (Spanish)

=== TV ratings ===
Opponent	Outlet	Viewers	Rating
UT Martin	ESPN+/SECN	†	†
Ball State	SECN	†	†
South Carolina	CBS	5,420,000	2.8
UAB	ESPN2	1,080,000	0.6
at Auburn	CBS	6,400,000	3.4
Kentucky	ESPN	3,190,000	1.6
at Vanderbilt	CBS	2,460,000	1.5
vs Florida	CBS	5,950,000	3.0
Missouri	CBS	7,000,000	3.8
Ole Miss	ESPN	4,830,000	2.5
at Tennessee	CBS	5,730,000	3.1
at Georgia Tech	ABC	5,330,000	2.6
vs Alabama	CBS	17,520,000	8.9
vs Florida State	ESPN	10,300,000	†

All totals via Sports Media Watch. Streaming numbers not included. † - Data not available.

== Rankings ==
Ranking movements Legend: ██ Increase in ranking ██ Decrease in ranking ( ) = First-place votes
	Week															
Poll	Pre	1	2	3	4	5	6	7	8	9	10	11	12	13	14	Final
AP	1 (60)	1 (58)	1 (55)	1 (57)	1 (55)	1 (35)	1 (50)	1 (43)	1 (38)	1 (48)	1 (49)	1 (54)	1 (61)	1 (52)	6	4
Coaches	1 (61)	1 (63)	1 (64)	1 (62)	1 (61)	1 (59)	1 (61)	1 (58)	1 (58)	1 (58)	1 (55)	1 (58)	1 (61)	1 (59)	6	3
CFP	Not released									2	2	1	1	1	6	Not released
