= Georgia Bulldogs Blowout =

The Georgia Bulldogs Blowout may refer to:

- The 2023 College Football Playoff National Championship, where the Bulldogs defeated the TCU Horned Frogs 65–7.
- The 2023 Orange Bowl, where the Bulldogs defeated the Florida State Seminoles 63–3.
