= Anthony Evans III =

American football player (born 2005)

No. 3 – Mississippi State Bulldogs
- Position: Wide receiver
- Class: Senior

Personal information
- Born: June 20, 2005 (age 21)
- Listed height: 5 ft 11 in (1.80 m)
- Listed weight: 180 lb (82 kg)

Career information
- High school: Judson (Converse, Texas)
- College: Georgia (2023–2024); Mississippi State (2025–present)
- Stats at ESPN

Anthony Jerry Evans III (born June 20, 2005) is an American college football wide receiver who plays for the Mississippi State Bulldogs. Evans previously played for the Georgia Bulldogs.

== Early life ==
Anthony Evans III was born on June 20, 2005, and is a native of Converse, Texas. He attended Judson High School, where he played football and track. As a junior, Evans earned first-team All-District honors after recording eight receptions for 202 yards and two touchdowns amidst Judson football's first losing season since 1976. In the spring of his junior year, he jumped 24 feet, 2.75 inches in the long jump along with a 10.27 time in the 100 meters, both of which were school records. As a senior, Evans recorded 66 receptions for 880 yards and eight touchdowns.

=== Recruiting ===
Evans initially committed to Arkansas in November 2021, before decommitting in April 2022. He cut the teams he was interested in to four, with Georgia, Oklahoma, and Texas A&M as the front runners. In August 2022, Evans committed to Oklahoma. However, amidst a disappointing 2022 season for Oklahoma and other recruits decomitting, he decomitted in November and flipped to Georgia.

== College career ==
=== Georgia ===
==== 2023 ====
In his first year at Georgia, Evans had 4 receptions for 35 yards. He recorded his first collegiate touchdown with a 14-yard reception against Florida State in the 2023 Orange Bowl. Evans also played as a punt returner, returning 4 punts for 55 yards, which included a 28-yard return against Alabama in the 2023 SEC Championship Game.

==== 2024 ====
Evans' contributions on special teams increased in his sophomore year, becoming Georgia's primary return specialist. Against Mississippi State, Evans had his best game offensively, making 4 receptions for 41 yards along with a 52-yard rush. Evans missed weeks 10 and 11 due to a hamstring injury. On the year, Evans had 9 receptions for 88 yards. Following the 2024 season, Evans entered the transfer portal.

=== Mississippi State ===
==== 2025 ====
On January 15, 2025, Evans announced that he would transfer to Mississippi State to continue playing football. In week 2 against Arizona State, Evans had 9 receptions for 108 yards and a touchdown. The following week against Alcorn State, Evans had 163 all-purpose yards, with 66 receiving yards and 97 yards on punt returns. Against Florida, Evans had a season-high 11 receptions in the game, along with 107 receiving yards. In week 10 against Arkansas, Evans had 5 receptions for 111 yards and 2 touchdowns, with the second touchdown being the de facto game winner for Mississippi State's first SEC win since 2023. For his efforts in week 10, Evans was named as an honorable mention for the weekly iteration of the Earl Campbell Tyler Rose Award. After week 11, Evans was named on the watchlist for the Biletnikoff Award. Evans performance greatly increased in his first year with Mississippi State, having a team-best 67 receptions along with 831 yards and 4 touchdowns, all of which were career-highs.

==== 2026 ====
Shortly after the 2025 season, Evans announced he would return to Mississippi State for his senior season in 2026. Before the season, Evans was named on the watchlist for the Biletnikoff Award and the Paul Hornung Award. In week 1 against Louisiana–Monroe, Evans had seven receptions for 118 yards along with one touchdown. The following week against Minnesota, Evans registered 121 receiving yards on seven receptions along with a touchdown. In week 4, during a win against Missouri, Evans had 8 receptions for 114 yards. Against Alabama in week 5, Evans recorded 12 receptions for 166 yards, both career-highs, along with two touchdowns. In week 12, against Tennessee Tech, Evans registered eight receptions for 129 yards and one touchdown.

=== College statistics ===
Season	Team	GP	Receiving				Rushing			
Season	Team	GP	Rec	Yds	Avg	TD	Att	Yards	Avg	TD
2023	Georgia	8	4	35	8.8	1	1	2	2.0	–
2024	Georgia	11	9	88	9.8	–	3	50	16.7	–
2025	Mississippi State	13	67	831	12.4	4	7	47	6.7	–
2026	Mississippi State	11	73	929	12.7	6	5	-4	-0.8	–
Career		43	153	1,883	12.3	11	16	95	5.9	0

== Personal life ==
Evans' parents are Anthony Evans II and Isabeal Evans. Much of his family on his mother's side are fans of Georgia and traveled with Evans when he toured its campus. Evans' uncle, Anthony Malbrough, played in the NFL, and his brother, Malyk Hamilton, played in USL League One.
