= Monroe Freeling =

American football player (born 2004)

No. 57 – Carolina Panthers
- Position: Offensive tackle
- Roster status: Active

Personal information
- Born: July 25, 2004 (age 22); Charleston, South Carolina, U.S.
- Listed height: 6 ft 7 in (2.01 m)
- Listed weight: 323 lb (147 kg)

Career information
- High school: Oceanside Collegiate (Mount Pleasant, South Carolina)
- College: Georgia (2023–2025)
- NFL draft: 2026: 1st round, 19th overall pick

Career history
- Carolina Panthers (2026–present)

Awards and highlights
- Second-team All-SEC (2025)

Career NFL statistics as of Week 4, 2026
- Games played: 4
- Games started: 4
- Stats at Pro Football Reference

Monroe Freeling (born July 25, 2004) is an American professional football offensive tackle for the Carolina Panthers of the National Football League (NFL). He played college football for the Georgia Bulldogs and was selected by the Panthers in the first round of the 2026 NFL draft.

== Early life ==
Freeling attended Oceanside Collegiate Academy in Mount Pleasant, South Carolina. He was selected to play in the 2023 All-American Bowl. He committed to the University of Georgia to play college football.

== College career ==
Freeling played in eight games as a backup his freshman year at Georgia in 2023. He played the first nine games of his sophomore season in 2024 as a backup, before starting the final four games at left tackle in place of injured Earnest Greene. Freeling entered his junior year in 2025 as the starting left tackle, earning a second-team All-SEC selection by conference coaches that year.

== Professional career ==
Pre-draft measurables
Height	Weight	Arm length	Hand span	Wingspan	40-yard dash	10-yard split	20-yard split	Vertical jump	Broad jump
6 ft 7 3/8 in (2.02 m)	315 lb (143 kg)	34 3/4 in (0.88 m)	10 3/4 in (0.27 m)	7 ft 0 1/2 in (2.15 m)	4.93 s	1.71 s	2.85 s	33.5 in (0.85 m)	9 ft 7 in (2.92 m)
All values from NFL Combine

Freeling was selected by the Carolina Panthers in the first round, with the 19th overall pick, of the 2026 NFL draft.
