= 2023 Orange Bowl =

Postseason college football bowl game

2023 Capital One Orange Bowl
- CFP New Year's Six; 90th Orange Bowl
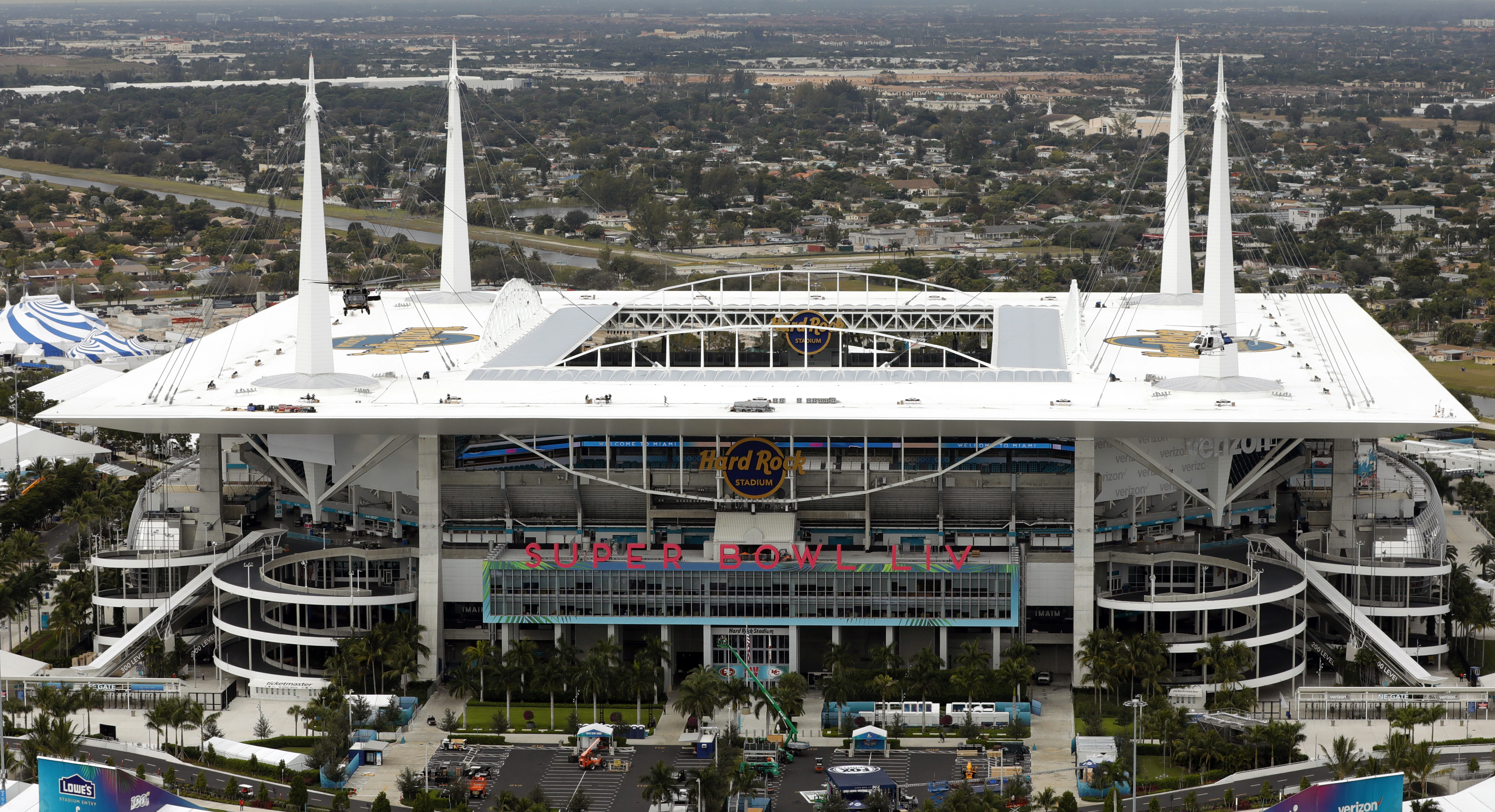
- Hard Rock Stadium in Miami Gardens, Florida, hosted the Orange Bowl.
Georgia Bulldogs	Florida State Seminoles
(12–1)	(13–0)
SEC	ACC
63	3
Head coach: Kirby Smart	Head coach: Mike Norvell
AP / Coaches / CFP; 6 / 6 / 6	AP / Coaches / CFP; 4 / 3 / 5
	1	2	3	4	Total
Georgia	7	35	14	7	63
Florida State	0	3	0	0	3
- Date: December 30, 2023
- Season: 2023
- Stadium: Hard Rock Stadium
- Location: Miami Gardens, Florida
- MVP: Kendall Milton (RB, Georgia)
- Favorite: Georgia by 14.5
- Referee: Greg Blum (Big Ten)
- Halftime show: Fitz and the Tantrums and Walk the Moon
- Attendance: 63,324

United States TV coverage
- Network: ESPN; ESPN Radio
- Announcers: ESPN: Joe Tessitore (play-by-play), Jesse Palmer (analyst), and Katie George (sideline); ESPN Radio: Dave Flemming (play-by-play), Brock Osweiler (analyst), and Kayla Burton (sideline) (ESPN Radio)

International TV coverage
- Network: ESPN Brazil
- Announcers: ESPN Brazil: Matheus Pinheiro (play-by-play) and Weinny Eirado (analyst)

The 2023 Orange Bowl was a college football bowl game played on December 30, 2023, at Hard Rock Stadium in Miami Gardens, Florida. The 90th annual Orange Bowl featured the Florida State Seminoles from the Atlantic Coast Conference (ACC) and the Georgia Bulldogs from the Southeastern Conference (SEC)—teams selected at-large by the College Football Playoff selection committee. The game began at 4:00 p.m. EST and aired on ESPN. The Orange Bowl was one of the 2023–24 bowl games concluding the 2023 FBS football season. The game was sponsored by bank holding company Capital One and was officially known as the Capital One Orange Bowl.

The 60-point victory for Georgia set a new record for the largest margin of victory in any bowl game at the FBS level (or its historical predecessors), surpassing the prior record of 58 points, which had been set by Georgia the previous season in the 2023 CFP National Championship game.

== Teams ==
The game featured the Florida State Seminoles from the Atlantic Coast Conference (ACC), and the Georgia Bulldogs from the Southeastern Conference (SEC). This was the 12th all-time meeting between the Seminoles and the Bulldogs; entering the game, Georgia led the series, 6-4-1.

=== Georgia ===
Georgia entered the season as two-time defending national champions, looking to add a third championship to become the first FBS college program to three-peat since Minnesota from 1934 to 1936. (Note: Army claims three national titles from 1944 to 1946, though the AP poll selected Army as national champions only for 1944 and 1945.) They earned strong wins over No. 20 Kentucky, No. 9 Ole Miss, and No. 18 Tennessee by margins of 51–13, 52–17 and 38–10, respectively. The Bulldogs were riding a 29-game winning streak, which started in the 2021 Orange Bowl, heading into the SEC Championship Game. However, the Bulldogs lost to No. 8 Alabama, 24–27, which caused them to finish with a record of 12–1. Subsequently, the Bulldogs were not selected for the College Football Playoff.

Georgia entered the Orange Bowl ranked sixth in each of the major polls.

=== Florida State ===
Florida State entered the season with high expectations after a 10–3 record last season, finishing No. 11 in the AP poll. After an assertive 45–24 win over No. 5 LSU to start the season, the Seminoles went on to win all of their regular season games. However, during their game against North Alabama, starting quarterback Jordan Travis suffered a season-ending injury. Since he was in his senior year, it also marked the end of his college career. After being drafted by the New York Jets in the 2024 NFL draft, he spent his first season in rehabbing the injury, which ultimately failed, forcing his retirement during the 2025 NFL offseason.

The Seminoles entered the ACC Championship Game with a 12–0 record and ranked at No. 4 in the CFP rankings. The team defeated No. 16 Louisville by 16–6. However, the Seminoles were placed at No. 5 in the final playoff rankings, becoming the first undefeated champion from a Power Five conference to be omitted from the playoffs in the CFP era (since the 2014 season). The final CFP rankings, which saw Alabama move up four spots to displace Florida State from a CFP semifinal berth, caused significant controversy. The Selection Committee cited the loss of Travis as a main reason why Florida State was left out of the playoffs. The committee factors player availability into its selections.

Florida State entered the Orange Bowl ranked fourth in the AP poll and fifth in the CFP rankings.

== Game summary ==
2023 Capital One Orange Bowl

Quarter	1	2	3	4	Total
No. 6 Georgia	7	35	14	7	63
No. 5 Florida State	0	3	0	0	3

at Hard Rock Stadium • Miami Gardens, Florida

- Date: Saturday, December 30, 2023
- Game time: 4:00 p.m. EST
- Game weather: Cloudy • Temperature: 65 °F (18 °C) • Wind: 2 mph (3.2 km/h) W
- Game attendance: 63,324
- Referee: Gregory Blum
- TV announcers (ESPN): Joe Tessitore (play-by-play), Jesse Palmer (analyst), and Katie George (sideline)
- Box score

Game information

First quarter

- (4:05) UGA – Kendall Milton 15-yard run, Peyton Woodring kick (Drive: 7 plays, 69 yards, 2:40; Georgia 7–0)

Second quarter

- (14:57) UGA – Kendall Milton 5-yard run, Peyton Woodring kick (Drive: 6 plays, 82 yards, 1:56; Georgia 14–0)
- (12:34) FSU – Ryan Fitzgerald 22-yard field goal (Drive: 6 plays, 71 yards, 2:23; Georgia 14–3)
- (10:38) UGA – Daijun Edwards 15-yard run, Peyton Woodring kick (Drive: 4 plays, 75 yards, 1:56; Georgia 21–3)
- (10:18) UGA – Ladd McConkey 27-yard run, Peyton Woodring kick (Drive: 1 plays, 27 yards, 0:20; Georgia 28–3)
- (3:39) UGA – Arian Smith 12-yard pass from Carson Beck, Peyton Woodring kick (Drive: 5 plays, 62 yards, 2:20; Georgia 35–3)
- (0:24) UGA – Dominic Lovett 2-yard pass from Carson Beck, Peyton Woodring kick (Drive: 3 plays, 51 yards, 0:25; Georgia 42–3)

Third quarter

- (9:23) UGA – Daijun Edwards 2-yard run, Peyton Woodring kick (Drive: 10 plays, 75 yards, 5:37; Georgia 49–3)
- (2:30) UGA – Lawson Luckie 4-yard pass from Gunner Stockton, Peyton Woodring kick (Drive: 10 plays, 90 yards, 4:31; Georgia 56–3)

Fourth quarter

- (12:10) UGA – Anthony Evans III 14-yard pass from Gunner Stockton, Peyton Woodring kick (Drive: 9 plays, 84 yards, 4:31; Georgia 63–3)

=== Statistics ===
Statistics	UGA	FSU
First downs	36	11
Plays–yards	76–673	53–209
Rushes–yards	47–372	26–63
Passing yards	301	146
Passing: comp–att–int	20–29–0	10–27–2
Time of possession	35:38	24:22

Team	Category	Player	Statistics
Georgia	Passing	Carson Beck	13-18, 203 yards, 2 TD
Georgia	Rushing	Kendall Milton	9 attempts, 104 yards, 2 TD
Georgia	Receiving	Dillon Bell	5 catches, 86 yards
Florida State	Passing	Brock Glenn	9-26, 139 yards, 2 INT
Florida State	Rushing	Ja'Khi Douglas	8 attempts, 46 yards
Florida State	Receiving	Kentron Poitier	4 catches, 84 yards
