= Dillon Bell (American football) =

American football player (born 2003)

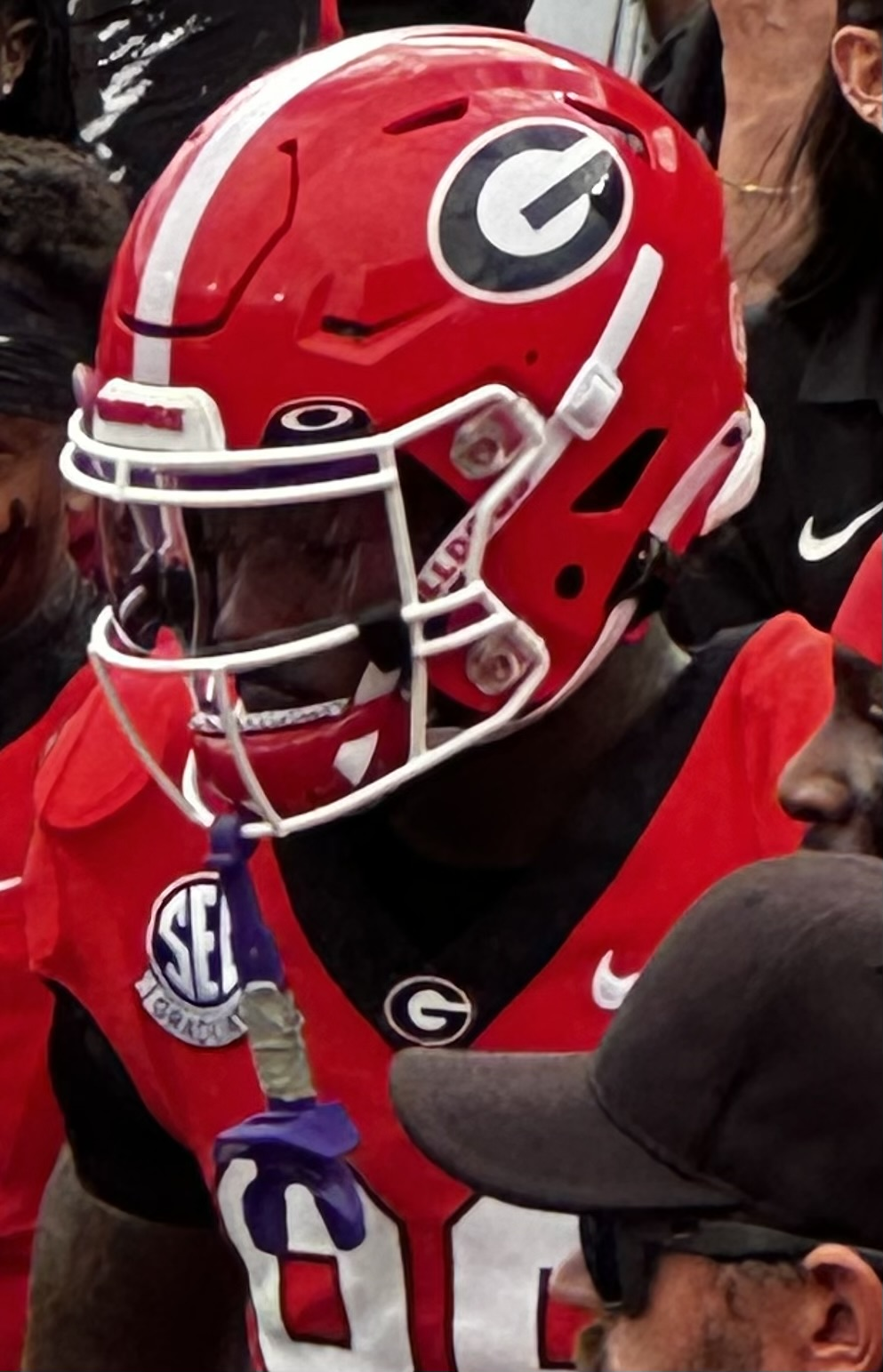
- Bell with the Bulldogs in 2025

No. 89 – Minnesota Vikings
- Position: Wide receiver
- Roster status: Practice squad

Personal information
- Born: November 6, 2003 (age 23); Houston, Texas, U.S.
- Listed height: 6 ft 1 in (1.85 m)
- Listed weight: 209 lb (95 kg)

Career information
- High school: The Kinkaid (Piney Point Village, Texas)
- College: Georgia (2022–2025)
- NFL draft: 2026: undrafted

Career history
- Minnesota Vikings (2026–present)*
- * Offseason or practice squad member only

Awards and highlights
- CFP national champion (2022)
- Stats at Pro Football Reference

Dillon Lee Bell (born November 6, 2003) is an American professional football wide receiver for the Minnesota Vikings of the National Football League (NFL). He played college football for the Georgia Bulldogs and he was signed as an undrafted free agent by the Vikings in 2026.

== Early life ==
Bell attended The Kinkaid School in Piney Point Village, Texas. As a senior, Bell totaled more than 1,300 total yards and 27 total touchdowns, including 14 rushing and 10 receiving. As a result, he was named the Offensive Player of the Year by the Houston Touchdown Club. A three-star recruit, he committed to play college football at the University of Georgia over offers from Michigan, Auburn, and Texas A&M.

== College career ==
In his first career collegiate game against Samford, Bell recorded his first career touchdown reception, a three-yard pass from Stetson Bennett. As a true freshman in 2022, Bell tallied 20 receptions for 180 yards and three touchdowns. The following year, he began to play running back in addition to being a wide receiver. Against Tennessee in 2023, Bell caught five passes for a career-high 90 yards and a touchdown, in addition to throwing an 18-yard touchdown pass to Marcus Rosemy-Jacksaint.

Season	Team	GP	Receiving				Rushing			
Season	Team	GP	Rec	Yds	Avg	TD	Att	Yards	Avg	TD
2022	Georgia	15	20	180	9.0	3	–	–	–	–
2023	Georgia	14	29	335	12.2	2	25	157	6.3	2
2024	Georgia	13	43	466	10.8	4	9	107	11.9	1
2025	Georgia	13	27	279	10.3	2	17	109	6.4	2
Career		55	119	1,280	10.8	11	51	373	7.3	5

== Professional career ==
Pre-draft measurables
Height	Weight	Arm length	Hand span	Wingspan	40-yard dash	10-yard split	20-yard split	Vertical jump	Broad jump	Bench press
6 ft 0 3/4 in (1.85 m)	209 lb (95 kg)	30 1/4 in (0.77 m)	9 1/2 in (0.24 m)	6 ft 4 in (1.93 m)	4.50 s	1.58 s	2.62 s	39.0 in (0.99 m)	10 ft 6 in (3.20 m)	16 reps
All values from NFL Combine/Pro Day

Bell was signed as an undrafted free agent by the Minnesota Vikings after the conclusion of the 2026 NFL draft. Bell initially made the 53-man roster on August 30, but he was released by Minnesota the next day. Bell was re-signed to the Vikings' practice squad on September 2.
