= 2023 SEC Championship Game =

- Conference Championship
Georgia Bulldogs	Alabama Crimson Tide
(12–0)	(11–1)
24	27
Head coach: Kirby Smart	Head coach: Nick Saban
AP / Coaches / CFP; 1 / 1 / 1	AP / Coaches / CFP; 8 / 8 / 8
	1	2	3	4	Total
Georgia	7	0	3	14	24
Alabama	3	14	3	7	27
- Date: December 2, 2023
- Season: 2023
- Stadium: Mercedes-Benz Stadium
- Location: Atlanta, Georgia
- MVP: Jalen Milroe
- Favorite: Georgia by 5.5
- Referee: Kyle Olson
- Attendance: 78,320

United States TV coverage
- Network: CBS; Westwood One; SEC Radio
- Announcers: Brad Nessler (play-by-play), Gary Danielson (color), and Jenny Dell (sideline) (CBS); Mike Watts (play-by-play), Derek Rackley (analyst) and Taylor Davis (sideline) (Westwood One); Dave Neal (play-by-play), Cole Cubelic (analyst) and Stephen Hartzell (sideline) (SEC Radio)

2023 Southeastern Conference football standings
	Conf.			Overall
Team	W		L	W		L
Eastern Division
No. 4 Georgia xy	8	–	0	13	–	1
No. 8 Missouri	6	–	2	11	–	2
No. 17 Tennessee	4	–	4	9	–	4
Kentucky	3	–	5	7	–	6
Florida	3	–	5	5	–	7
South Carolina	3	–	5	5	–	7
Vanderbilt	0	–	8	2	–	10
Western Division
No. 5 Alabama xy$^	8	–	0	12	–	2
No. 9 Ole Miss	6	–	2	11	–	2
No. 12 LSU	6	–	2	10	–	3
Texas A&M	4	–	4	7	–	6
Auburn	3	–	5	6	–	7
Mississippi State	1	–	7	5	–	7
Arkansas	1	–	7	4	–	8
Championship: Alabama 27, Georgia 24
^ – College Football Playoff participant; $ – Conference champion; x – Division champion/co-champions; y – Championship game participant; Rankings from AP Poll

The 2023 SEC Championship Game was a college football game that was played on December 2, 2023, at Mercedes-Benz Stadium in Atlanta. It was the 32nd edition of the SEC Championship Game. The contest featured the Alabama Crimson Tide, the West Division champions and the Georgia Bulldogs the East Division Champions. The game began at 4:00 p.m. EST and was televised on CBS for the twenty-third consecutive year, and also the final SEC Championship game to be televised on the network. Alabama won the game by a score of 27–24 and, therefore, became champions of the Southeastern Conference (SEC) for the 2023 season, while ending Georgia's 29-game winning streak that began in the 2021 Orange Bowl CFP Semifinal. Alabama would later advance to the 2023–24 College Football Playoff and lose against the Michigan Wolverines at the 2024 Rose Bowl; Georgia did not advance to the playoffs and instead and would have a blowout game against the Florida State Seminoles at the 2023 Orange Bowl.

This was the final SEC Championship Game with a divisional format. On June 1, 2023, after Oklahoma and Texas were confirmed to be joining the conference in 2024, the SEC announced that it would eliminate its football divisions at that time. Future championship games will feature the top two teams in the conference standings.

== Teams ==
The 2023 SEC Championship Game featured the Georgia Bulldogs, champions of the East Division, and the Alabama Crimson Tide, champions of the West Division. It was the teams' 73rd meeting, with Alabama leading the series 42–26–4. Georgia won the latest meeting between the teams in the 2022 College Football Playoff National Championship, which was Georgia's first win against Alabama since 2007. This was the fourth time Georgia and Alabama played for an SEC Championship, with the Crimson Tide winning each of the previous three meetings in 2012, 2018 and 2021.

This was the 11th SEC title game appearance for Georgia and their third consecutive appearance; they first appeared in 2002 and are 4–6 overall in previous appearances, though the Bulldogs have won 14 SEC championships in total, dating back to 1942. Alabama made their 15th SEC championship game appearance, dating back to the inaugural game in 1992; the Crimson Tide entered the game 10–4 in SEC title games. Including titles earned before the championship game format, Alabama leads the conference with 29 in total, dating back to 1933. Georgia and Alabama have appeared frequently in recent SEC Championship Games; entering the game, 12 of the last 13 title games featured at least one of the two teams, with Georgia's last appearance being in 2022, and Alabama's in 2021.

=== Alabama Crimson Tide ===
The Crimson Tide clinched a spot in the game on November 11, following a 49–21 rout of Kentucky. Alabama's last appearance, and victory, in the game was in 2021. This would be Nick Saban's last SEC Championship game appearance, as he retired following the conclusion of the 2023 season.

=== Georgia Bulldogs ===
The Bulldogs clinched a spot in the game following Missouri's 36–7 defeat of Tennessee on November 11. Georgia's last appearance, and victory, in the game was in 2022.

== Scoring summary ==
2023 SEC Championship

Quarter	1	2	3	4	Total
No. 1 Georgia	7	0	3	14	24
No. 8 Alabama	3	14	3	7	27

at Mercedes-Benz Stadium • Atlanta, GA

- Date: December 2, 2023
- Game time: 4:11 p.m. EST
- Game weather: n/a (game played indoors)
- Game attendance: 78,320
- Referee: Kyle Olson
- TV announcers (CBS): Brad Nessler (play-by-play), Gary Danielson (analyst), Jenny Dell (sideline)

Game information

First quarter

- (9:31) UGA – Kendall Milton 17 yd Run (Peyton Woodring Kick) (Drive: 8 plays, 83 yards, 3:50; Georgia 7–0)
- (3:43) BAMA – Will Reichard 43 yd Field Goal (Drive: 8 plays, 26 yards, 3:48; Georgia 7–3)

Second quarter

- (12:04) BAMA – Jam Miller 28 yd pass from Jalen Milroe (Will Reichard Kick) (Drive: 10 plays, 92 yards, 4:32; Alabama 10–7)
- (0:48) BAMA – Jermaine Burton 15 yd pass from Jalen Milroe (Will Reichard Kick) (Drive: 9 plays, 69 yards, 3:49; Alabama 17–7)

Third quarter

- (8:51) UGA – Peyton Woodring 34 yd Field Goal (Drive: 5 plays, 54 yards, 1:45; Alabama 17–10)
- (0:48) BAMA – Will Reichard 28 Yd Field Goal (Drive: 4 plays, 1 yard, 1:26; Alabama 20–10)

Fourth quarter

- (10:16) UGA – Carson Beck 1 yd Run (Peyton Woodring Kick) (Drive: 4 plays, 35 yards, 1:37; Alabama 20–17)
- (5:47) BAMA – Roydell Williams 1 yd Run (Will Reichard Kick) (Drive: 9 plays, 75 yards, 4:29; Alabama 27–17)
- (2:52) UGA – Kendall Milton 1 yd Run (Peyton Woodring Kick) (Drive: 10 plays, 75 yards, 2:55; Alabama 27–24)

=== Statistics ===
Statistics	UGA	ALA
First downs	19	20
Plays–yards	60–321	64–306
Rushes–yards	31–78	41–114
Passing yards	243	192
Passing: comp–att–int	21–29–0	13–23–0
Turnovers		
Time of possession	28:51	31:09

Team	Category	Player	Statistics
Georgia	Passing	Carson Beck	21/29, 243 yards
Georgia	Rushing	Kendall Milton	13 carries, 42 yards, 2 TD
Georgia	Receiving	Brock Bowers	5 receptions, 53 yards
Alabama	Passing	Jalen Milroe	13/23, 192 yards, 2 TD
Alabama	Rushing	Roydell Williams	16 carries, 64 yards, 1 TD
Alabama	Receiving	Isaiah Bond	5 receptions, 79 yards

== Broadcasting ==
CBS broadcast their 23rd consecutive and final SEC Championship Game. Under a new ten-year agreement that begins the following season, ABC will broadcast the championship game, with CBS beginning a full-slate of Big Ten football games, including the Big Ten Football Championship Game next season and in 2028.
