= Troy Bowles =

American football player (born 2005)

No. 18 – Michigan Wolverines
- Position: Linebacker
- Class: Senior

Personal information
- Born: March 29, 2005 (age 21)
- Listed height: 6 ft 0 in (1.83 m)
- Listed weight: 224 lb (102 kg)

Career information
- High school: Jesuit (Tampa, Florida)
- College: Georgia (2023–2024); Michigan (2025–present)
- Stats at ESPN

Troy Isaiah Bowles (born March 29, 2005) is an American football linebacker for the Michigan Wolverines. Bowles previously played for the Georgia Bulldogs. He is the son of Tampa Bay Buccaneers head coach, Todd Bowles.

== Early life and high school ==
Bowles attended Jesuit High School in Tampa, Florida. He was rated as a four-star recruit and the 44th overall player in his class by 247Sports, and received numerous Power 4 offers. Bowles committed to play college football for the Georgia Bulldogs.

== College career ==
In two seasons at Georgia in 2023 and 2024, Bowles tallied five tackles in seven games played. After the conclusion of the 2024 season, he entered the NCAA transfer portal.

Bowles transferred to play for the Michigan Wolverines. In the 2025 season opener, he notched three tackles with two being for a loss, and a sack, in a win over New Mexico. In week 3, Bowles forced a fumble in a victory over Central Michigan. He played in all 13 games that season, making 27 tackles with two being for a loss, a sack, and a forced fumble.

== Personal life ==
Bowles is the son of NFL head coach, Todd Bowles.
