= Tykee Smith =

American football player (born 2001)

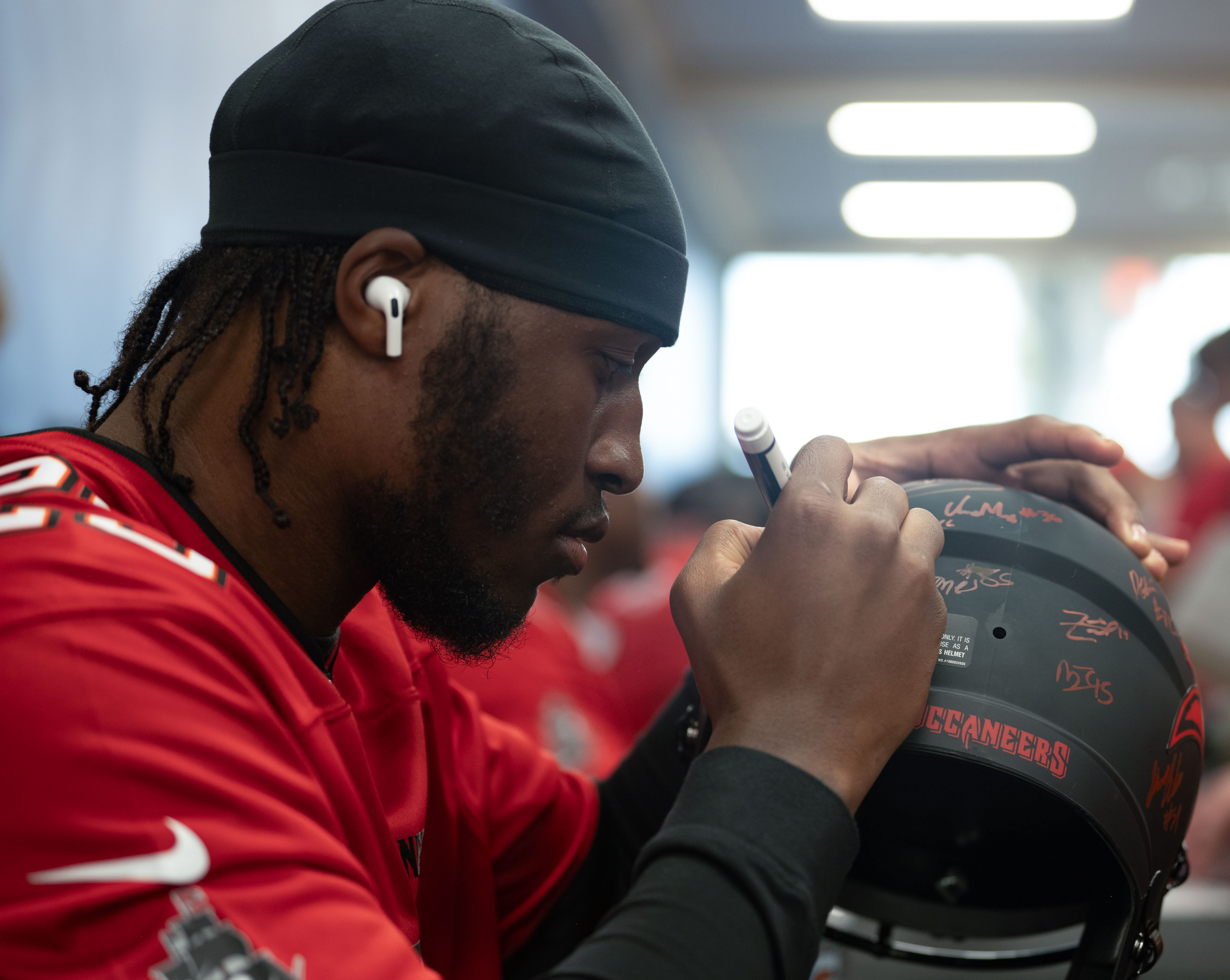
- Smith with the Tampa Bay Buccaneers in 2024

No. 23 – Tampa Bay Buccaneers
- Position: Safety
- Roster status: Active

Personal information
- Born: February 18, 2001 (age 25); Philadelphia, Pennsylvania, U.S.
- Listed height: 5 ft 10 in (1.78 m)
- Listed weight: 202 lb (92 kg)

Career information
- High school: Imhotep Institute Charter (Philadelphia)
- College: West Virginia (2019–2020); Georgia (2021–2023)
- NFL draft: 2024: 3rd round, 89th overall pick

Career history
- Tampa Bay Buccaneers (2024–present)

Awards and highlights
- 2× CFP National Champion (2021, 2022); All-American (2020); Freshman All-American (2019); Second-team All-Big 12 (2020); Second-team All-SEC (2023)

Career NFL statistics as of Week 9, 2026
- Total tackles: 204
- Sacks: 2.0
- Forced fumbles: 4
- Fumble recoveries: 2
- Pass deflections: 20
- Interceptions: 5
- Stats at Pro Football Reference

Tykee Quideir Smith (born February 18, 2001) is an American professional football safety for the Tampa Bay Buccaneers of the National Football League (NFL). He played college football for the West Virginia Mountaineers and Georgia Bulldogs.

== Early life ==
Smith attended Imhotep Institute Charter High School in Philadelphia, Pennsylvania. A three-star recruit, Smith committed to play college football at West Virginia University.

== College career ==
=== West Virginia ===
As a true freshman in 2019, Smith recorded 53 tackles, one sack, and two interceptions. As a result, he was named to the Freshman All-American team. The following year, Smith tallied 61 tackles and two interceptions, while being named an All-American. On March 24, 2021, Smith announced his decision to enter the transfer portal.

=== Georgia ===
On April 4, 2021, Smith announced his decision to transfer to the University of Georgia. During his first year at Georgia, Smith played sparingly due to a knee injury. Against Missouri the following season, he made key plays late in the game to help secure a 26–22 victory. During the game, Smith contributed three tackles and a pass deflection. He finished the season with 29 tackles and two sacks. During the 2023 season opener against UT Martin, Smith tallied six tackles before exiting the game with a knee injury. He returned the following week against Ball State, recording an interception. Smith tallied interceptions in three consecutive games after having interceptions against both South Carolina and UAB the following weeks. He finished the season with 70 total tackles, four interceptions, and two sacks before declaring for the 2024 NFL Draft.

== Professional career ==
Pre-draft measurables
| Height | Weight | Arm length | Hand span | Wingspan | 40-yard dash | 10-yard split | 20-yard split | 20-yard shuttle | Three-cone drill | Vertical jump | Broad jump | Bench press |
|---|---|---|---|---|---|---|---|---|---|---|---|---|
| 5 ft 10 in (1.78 m) | 202 lb (92 kg) | 31 5/8 in (0.80 m) | 9 1/4 in (0.23 m) | 6 ft 2 3/4 in (1.90 m) | 4.46 s | 1.58 s | 2.60 s | 4.33 s | 7.01 s | 36.0 in (0.91 m) | 10 ft 0 in (3.05 m) | 16 reps |
All values from NFL Combine/Pro Day

Smith was selected in the third round (89th overall) of the 2024 NFL draft by the Tampa Bay Buccaneers.

== NFL career statistics ==
=== Regular season ===
| Year | Team | Games | | Tackles | | | | | | Interceptions | | | | Fumbles | | | |
| Year | Team | GP | GS | Cmb | Solo | Ast | Sck | TFL | QBH | Int | Yds | TD | PD | FF | FR | Yds | TD |
|---|---|---|---|---|---|---|---|---|---|---|---|---|---|---|---|---|---|
| 2024 | TB | 13 | 6 | 54 | 38 | 16 | 0.0 | 4 | 2 | 1 | 0 | 0 | 7 | 3 | 0 | 0 | 0 |
| 2025 | TB | 16 | 16 | 100 | 61 | 39 | 2.0 | 6 | 5 | 2 | 0 | 0 | 13 | 0 | 2 | 0 | 0 |
| Career | | 29 | 22 | 154 | 99 | 55 | 2.0 | 10 | 7 | 3 | 0 | 0 | 20 | 3 | 2 | 0 | 0 |

=== Postseason ===
| Year | Team | Games | | Tackles | | | | | | Interceptions | | | | Fumbles | | | |
| Year | Team | GP | GS | Cmb | Solo | Ast | Sck | TFL | QBH | Int | Yds | TD | PD | FF | FR | Yds | TD |
|---|---|---|---|---|---|---|---|---|---|---|---|---|---|---|---|---|---|
| 2024 | TB | 1 | 0 | 7 | 5 | 2 | 0.0 | 0 | 0 | 0 | 0 | 0 | 0 | 0 | 0 | 0 | 0 |
| Career | | 1 | 0 | 7 | 5 | 2 | 0.0 | 0 | 0 | 0 | 0 | 0 | 0 | 0 | 0 | 0 | 0 |

== Personal life ==
Smith is a Muslim.
