= Kendall Milton =

American football player (born 2002)

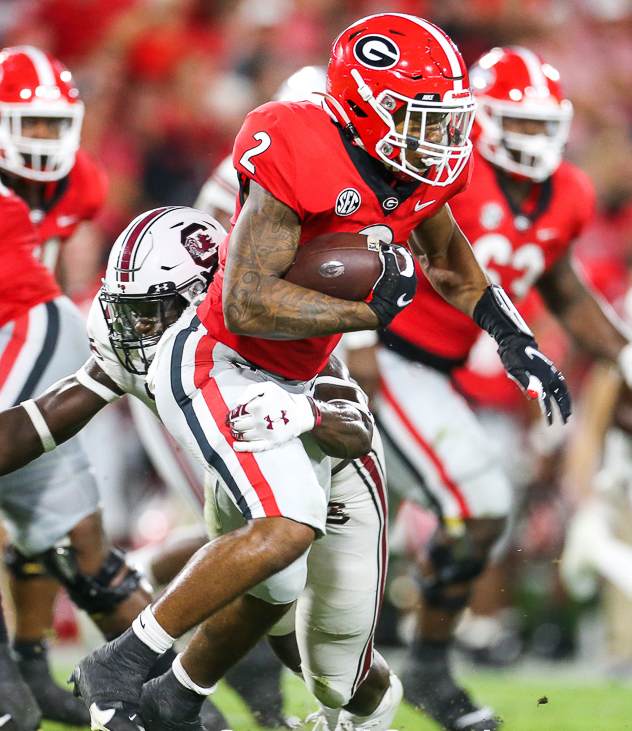
- Milton with the Georgia Bulldogs in 2021

No. 36 – Cincinnati Bengals
- Position: Running back
- Roster status: Practice squad

Personal information
- Born: February 10, 2002 (age 24); Clovis, California, U.S.
- Listed height: 6 ft 1 in (1.85 m)
- Listed weight: 230 lb (104 kg)

Career information
- High school: Buchanan (Clovis)
- College: Georgia (2020–2023)
- NFL draft: 2024: undrafted

Career history
- Philadelphia Eagles (2024)*; Cincinnati Bengals (2024–present)
- * Offseason or practice squad member only

Awards and highlights
- 2× CFP national champion (2021, 2022)

Career NFL statistics as of 2025
- Rushing yards: 2
- Rushing average: 1
- Stats at Pro Football Reference

Kendall Daniel Milton (born February 10, 2002) is an American professional football running back for the Cincinnati Bengals of the National Football League (NFL). He played college football for the Georgia Bulldogs.

== Early life ==
Kendall grew up in Clovis, California, and attended Buchanan High School. In his senior season he would total 1,514 yards rushing and 23 touchdowns. 247Sports listed Milton as a five-star recruit early on until his commitment to Georgia, at which time they changed him to a four-star. Milton was also the number one running back and the seventh best player overall from California, and 54th best player in the country. Rivals had Milton as a five-star recruit and the 29th player nationally. He selected Georgia over the likes of Alabama, Ohio State and Texas.

== College career ==
Upon Milton's arrival at the University of Georgia, he was able to earn significant playing time, early in games, even as a true freshman. Even with tough competition he managed 193 yards on 35 attempts. Milton suffered an injury mid-season against rival Florida. He would return in the Peach Bowl. In addition, although he missed half of the season to injury, Milton was able to earn All American Freshman honors. The following season, Milton production increased as he ran for 264 yards and a touchdown with 56 carries. In 2022, he ran for 592 yards and eight touchdowns before his season was cut short due to a groin injury.

Against Georgia Tech in 2023, Milton rushed for a career-high 156 yards and two touchdowns, in a 31–23 victory. In the 2023 Orange Bowl, Milton rushed for 104 yards and two touchdowns on nine carries, being named the MVP of the game and helping lead Georgia to the largest margin of victory in any bowl game at the FBS level with a 63–3 rout of Florida State. He finished the year rushing for 790 yards and 14 touchdowns. On January 1, 2024, Milton declared for the 2024 NFL draft.

== Professional career ==
Pre-draft measurables
Height	Weight	Arm length	Hand span	Wingspan	40-yard dash	10-yard split	20-yard split	20-yard shuttle	Vertical jump	Broad jump	Bench press
6 ft 1 1/2 in (1.87 m)	225 lb (102 kg)	31 3/4 in (0.81 m)	9 5/8 in (0.24 m)	6 ft 5 1/2 in (1.97 m)	4.62 s	1.51 s	2.69 s	4.38 s	35.5 in (0.90 m)	10 ft 4 in (3.15 m)	18 reps
All values from NFL Combine

=== Philadelphia Eagles ===
Milton was signed by the Philadelphia Eagles as an undrafted free agent on May 3, 2024. He was waived by the Eagles on August 27.

=== Cincinnati Bengals ===
On August 29, 2024, Milton was signed to the Cincinnati Bengals' practice squad. He was promoted to the active roster on November 2. On November 15, Milton was waived by the Bengals. The Bengals re-sign him to their practice squad on November 19. On January 2, 2025, the Bengals signed Milton to their active roster.

On August 26, 2025, Milton was waived by the Bengals as part of final roster cuts and re-signed to the practice squad the next day.

Milton re-signed with the Bengals on February 20, 2026. On August 30, Milton was waived by Cincinnati as a part of final roster cuts; he was re-signed to the team's practice squad the next day.

== Career statistics ==
College statistics
Year	Team	Games	Rushing				Receiving			
Year	Team	GP	Att	Yards	Avg	TD	Rec	Yards	Avg	TD
2020	Georgia	7	35	193	5.5	0	1	22	22.0	0
2021	Georgia	8	56	264	4.7	1	2	5	2.5	0
2022	Georgia	13	85	592	7.0	8	5	64	12.8	1
2023	Georgia	13	121	790	6.5	14	4	25	6.3	0
Career		41	297	1,839	6.2	23	12	116	9.7	1

== Personal life ==
Milton is the nephew of former NFL linebacker, Kevin Hardy.
