= Sam M'Pemba =

American football player (born 2004)

Samuel M'Pemba
No. 15 – Texas A&M Aggies
- Position: Outside linebacker
- Class: Redshirt Junior

Personal information
- Born: October 3, 2004 (age 22)
- Listed height: 6 ft 3 in (1.91 m)
- Listed weight: 252 lb (114 kg)

Career information
- High school: IMG Academy
- College: Georgia (2023–2024); Texas A&M (2025–present)
- Stats at ESPN

Samuel Carlos Kosi M'Pemba (born October 3, 2004) is an American college football outside linebacker for the Texas A&M Aggies. He previously played for the Georgia Bulldogs.

== Early life ==
M'Pemba was born on October 3, 2004, to Martial and Mimi M'Pemba. He began his high school career at Ladue Horton Watkins High School in St. Louis, and then transferred as a junior in 2021 to the IMG Academy in Bradenton, Florida. He was rated by Rivals.com as the No. 10 player overall, and the No. 2 defensive end, in the 2023 college football recruiting class. He received scholarship offers from schools like Alabama, Florida State, Miami, Michigan, Ohio State, Oklahoma, Oregon, Texas, Texas A&M, and USC. In December 2022, M'Pemba committed to Georgia.

== College career ==
As a freshman in 2023, M'Pemba recorded six tackles in 10 games at reserve outside linebacker.

On December 13, 2024, M'Pemba announced that he would enter the NCAA transfer portal. On December 23, he announced that he would transfer to Texas A&M.

== Personal life ==
In 2023, M'Pemba was cited by the Oconee County Sheriff's Office for driving 88 miles per hour in a 55 mile per hour zone. He was majoring in housing management and policy at Georgia.
