= Earnest Greene =

American football player (born 2003)

Earnest Greene III
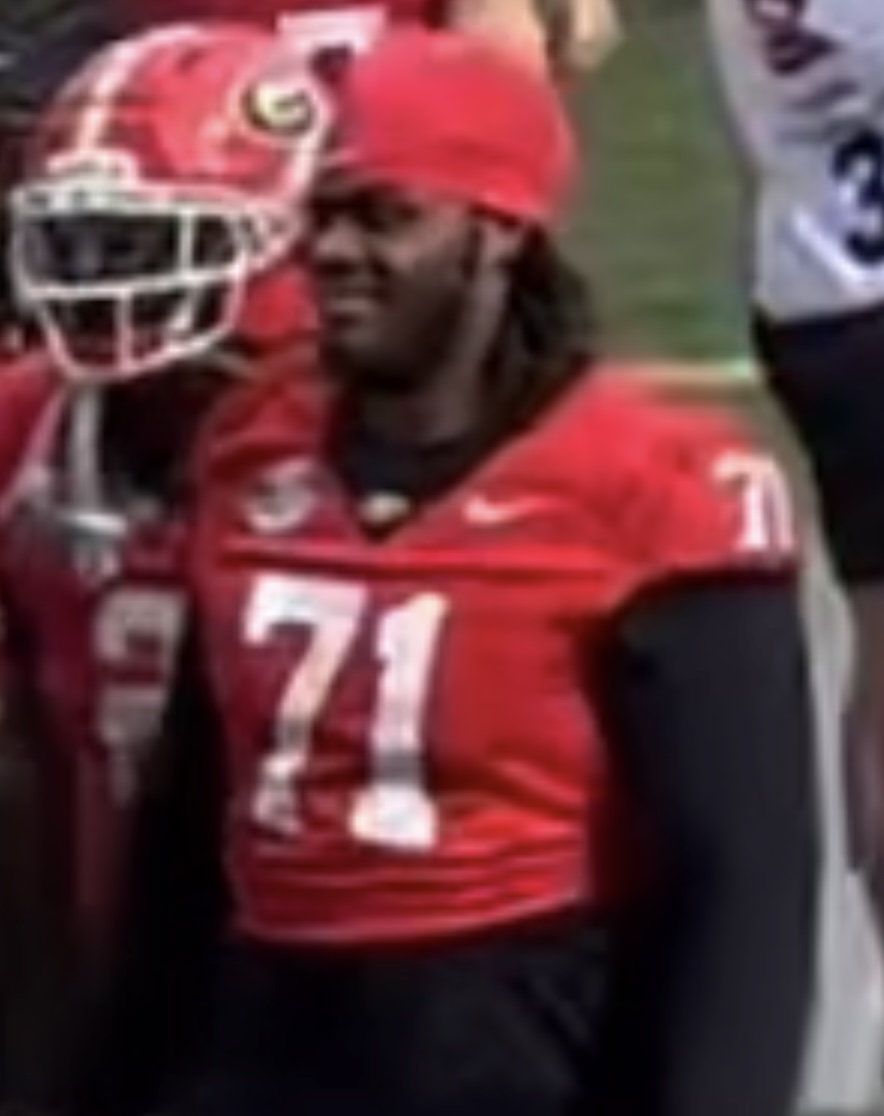
- Greene in 2025

No. 71 – Georgia Bulldogs
- Position: Offensive tackle
- Class: Fifth year

Personal information
- Born: October 31, 2003 (age 23)
- Listed height: 6 ft 4 in (1.93 m)
- Listed weight: 320 lb (145 kg)

Career information
- High school: St. John Bosco (Bellflower, California)
- College: Georgia (2022–present)

Awards and highlights
- SEC All-Freshman Team (2023)
- Stats at ESPN

Earnest Allen Greene III (born October 31, 2003) is an American college football offensive tackle for the Georgia Bulldogs of the Southeastern Conference (SEC).

== Early life ==
Greene attended St. John Bosco High School, where he was a four-year starter on the football team and earned an invite to play in the All-American Bowl. He was rated as a four-star recruit, the number 40 prospect, and the number two interior offensive lineman in his class. Greene committed to play college football for the Georgia Bulldogs over offers from schools such as Alabama, Texas, and Ohio State.

== College career ==
As a freshman in 2022, Greene did not play due to lingering injuries and back surgery. In 2023, he earned the Bulldogs starting spot at left tackle and started all 14 games. For his performance on the season, Greene was named to the SEC All-Freshman Team.

== Personal life ==
Greene is the son of former NFL and Super Bowl-winning offensive lineman Earnest Greene Jr.
