= Marcus Rosemy-Jacksaint =

American football player (born 2002)

Profile
- Position: Wide receiver

Personal information
- Born: January 8, 2002 (age 24); Pompano Beach, Florida, U.S.
- Listed height: 6 ft 1 in (1.85 m)
- Listed weight: 205 lb (93 kg)

Career information
- High school: St. Thomas Aquinas (Fort Lauderdale, Florida)
- College: Georgia (2020–2023)
- NFL draft: 2024: undrafted

Career history
- Washington Commanders (2024)*; Philadelphia Eagles (2024)*; Edmonton Elks (2025)*
- * Offseason or practice squad member only

Awards and highlights
- 2× CFP national champion (2021, 2022)
- Stats at Pro Football Reference

Marcus David Rosemy-Jacksaint (born January 8, 2002) is an American professional football wide receiver. He played college football for the Georgia Bulldogs, winning two national championships before signing with the Washington Commanders as an undrafted free agent in 2024.

== Early life ==
Rosemy-Jacksaint was born on January 8, 2002, in Pompano Beach, Florida. He attended St. Thomas Aquinas High School in Fort Lauderdale. Coming out of high school, Rosemy-Jacksaint was rated as a four-star recruit. He committed to play college football for the Georgia Bulldogs over Miami and Ohio State.

== College career ==
Rosemy-Jacksaint's 2020 season was ended short after he suffered a season-ending leg injury on a 32-yard touchdown reception versus Florida. He finished his true freshman season in 2020 with four receptions for 62 yards and a touchdown. In the 2021 season, Rosemy-Jacksaint hauled in seven passes for 94 yards. During the 2022 season, he notched 29 receptions for 337 yards and two touchdowns. Rosemy-Jacksaint finished the 2023 season with 32 receptions for 502 yards and four touchdowns. After the conclusion of the 2023 season, Rosemy-Jacksaint decided to declare for the 2024 NFL draft.

== Professional career ==
Pre-draft measurables
Height	Weight	Arm length	Hand span	40-yard dash	10-yard split	20-yard split	20-yard shuttle	Three-cone drill	Vertical jump	Broad jump	Bench press
6 ft 1 1/8 in (1.86 m)	195 lb (88 kg)	33 in (0.84 m)	10 in (0.25 m)	4.84 s	1.66 s	2.78 s	4.45 s	7.35 s	35.0 in (0.89 m)	9 ft 11 in (3.02 m)	11 reps
All values from NFL Combine/Pro Day

=== Washington Commanders ===
Rosemy-Jacksaint signed with the Washington Commanders as an undrafted free agent on April 29, 2024. He was released by the Commanders on August 27.

=== Philadelphia Eagles ===
On August 28, 2024, Rosemy-Jacksaint signed with the practice squad of the Philadelphia Eagles. Rosemy-Jacksaint was released by the Eagles on November 26.

=== Edmonton Elks ===
On May 11, 2025, Rosemy-Jacksaint signed with the Edmonton Elks of the Canadian Football League. He was released on June 1, 2025.

== Personal life ==
In 2023, Rosemy-Jacksaint was given six months of probation and fined $1,000 after going 90 miles per hour in a 45-mile-per-hour zone.
