= 2026 Georgia Bulldogs football team =

American college football season

2026 Georgia Bulldogs football

SEC Championship Game
- Conference: Southeastern Conference

Ranking
- Coaches: No. 1
- AP: No. 1
- CFP: No. 1
- Record: 10–1 (8–1 SEC)
- Head coach: Kirby Smart (11th season)
- Offensive coordinator: Mike Bobo (12th season)
- Offensive scheme: Pro spread
- Defensive coordinator: Glenn Schumann (8th season)
- Co-defensive coordinator: Travaris Robinson (3rd season)
- Base defense: 3–4
- Home stadium: Sanford Stadium

Uniform
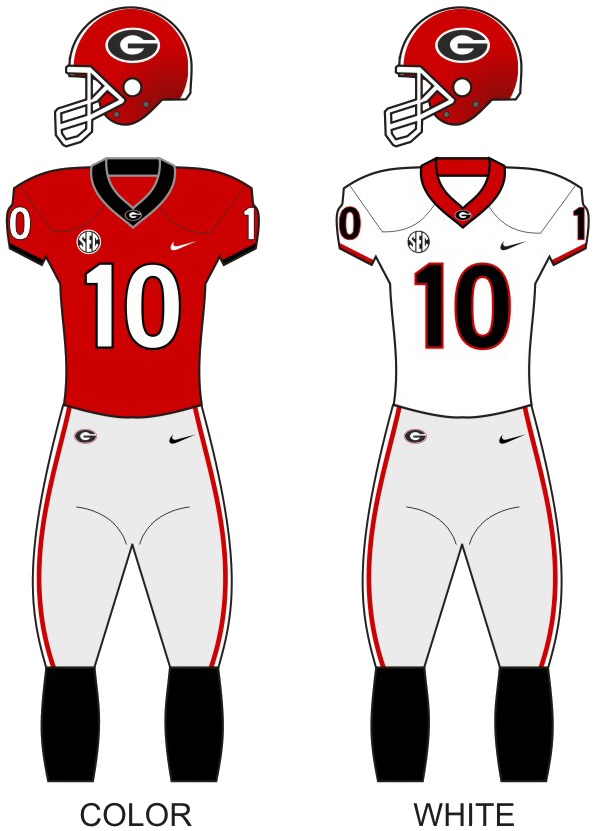

2026 Southeastern Conference football standings
	Conf.			Overall
Team	W		L	W		L
No. 1 Georgia y	8	–	1	10	–	1
No. 5 Texas	6	–	2	9	–	2
No. 9 Tennessee	6	–	2	9	–	2
No. 3 Alabama	6	–	2	9	–	2
No. 22 Oklahoma	5	–	3	7	–	4
No. 24 Florida	5	–	4	7	–	4
No. 16 Kentucky	5	–	4	7	–	4
No. 25 Ole Miss	4	–	4	7	–	4
Auburn	4	–	4	7	–	4
Missouri	4	–	4	7	–	4
No. 21 South Carolina	4	–	5	6	–	5
LSU	3	–	5	6	–	5
Mississippi State	2	–	6	5	–	6
Arkansas	2	–	6	4	–	7
Texas A&M	1	–	7	4	–	7
Vanderbilt	1	–	7	4	–	7
Championship: Georgia vs TBD
^ – College Football Playoff participant; $ – Conference champion; y – Championship game participant; As of November 22, 2026; Rankings from CFP rankings

The 2026 Georgia Bulldogs football team represents the University of Georgia as a member of the Southeastern Conference (SEC) during the 2026 NCAA Division I FBS football season. The team is led by eleventh-year head coach Kirby Smart and plays home games at Sanford Stadium.

Georgia entered the season ranked No. 3 in both the AP and Coaches polls. The Bulldogs opened the season with two non-conference games, defeating Tennessee State 63–3 and Western Kentucky 70–20. Following the win over Tennessee State, Georgia rose to No. 2 in the AP Poll. In their SEC opener, the Bulldogs defeated Arkansas 45–17 on the road, then beat Oklahoma 41–13 in their first meeting as conference opponents and Vanderbilt 38–14. Georgia remained ranked No. 2 through Week 5. The Bulldogs' game against No. 6 Alabama was their first against a ranked opponent, and Georgia won 20–17, rising to No. 1 the next day. Georgia's undefeated season came to an end the following week with a 27–24 loss to Auburn in the Deep South's Oldest Rivalry, marking the Bulldogs' first defeat to the Tigers since 2017.

Following a bye week, Georgia bounced back with a 27–8 victory over No. 17 Florida in Atlanta. The Bulldogs then traveled to Oxford and routed No. 10 Ole Miss 42–7 before returning home to defeat No. 22 Missouri 48–21. Georgia clinched a spot in the SEC Championship Game with a 34–6 drubbing of rival South Carolina.

== Offseason ==
Positions key
Offense	Defense	Special teams
QB — Quarterback; RB — Running back; FB — Fullback; WR — Wide receiver; TE — Tight end; OL — Offensive lineman; T — Tackle; G — Guard; C — Center	DL — Defensive lineman; DT — Defensive tackle (Note: Includes nose tackle (NT)); DE — Defensive end; EDGE — Edge rusher; LB — Linebacker (Note: Includes middle linebacker (MLB/MIKE), weakside linebacker (WILL), strongside linebacker (SAM), off-ball linebacker, and outside linebacker (OLB)); DB — Defensive back; CB — Cornerback; S — Safety (Note: Includes free safety (FS) and strong safety (SS))	K — Kicker (Note: Also known as a placekicker (PK)); P — Punter; LS — Long snapper; RS — Return specialist (Note: Includes kickoff and punt returners)

=== Offseason departures ===
==== NFL draftees ====
Player	Round	Pick	Team	Position
Monroe Freeling	1	19	Carolina Panthers	T
Christen Miller	2	42	New Orleans Saints	DT
CJ Allen	2	53	Indianapolis Colts	LB
Oscar Delp	3	73	New Orleans Saints	TE
Zachariah Branch	3	79	Atlanta Falcons	WR
Daylen Everette	3	85	Pittsburgh Steelers	CB
Colbie Young	4	140	Cincinnati Bengals	WR
Micah Morris	6	207	Philadelphia Eagles	G
Dillon Bell	Undrafted		Minnesota Vikings	WR
Brett Thorson	Undrafted		Minnesota Vikings	P
Noah Thomas	Undrafted		Cincinnati Bengals	WR
Beau Gardner	Undrafted		Chicago Bears	LS
Cash Jones	Undrafted		Atlanta Falcons	RB

=== Transfer portal ===
Thirteen Georgia Bulldogs players entered the NCAA transfer portal during or after the 2025 season. During the offseason, Georgia added eleven players from the transfer portal.

==== Departures ====
Departing transfers
Name	No.	Pos.	Height/weight	Class	Hometown	New school	Sources
Roderick Robinson II	#0	RB	6'1", 235 lbs	(redshirt) Sophomore	San Diego, CA	UAB	
Daniel Harris	#7	CB	6'3", 195 lbs	Junior	Miami, FL	California	
Joenel Aguero	#8	CB	5'11", 205 lbs	Junior	Lynn, MA	Ole Miss	
Jaden Harris	#12	S	6'0", 200 lbs	(redshirt) Junior	Atlanta, GA	Kansas	
Adrian Maddox	#14	S	6'1", 200 lbs	Senior	Conyers, GA	Kansas State	
Elo Modozie	#18	OLB	6'4", 248 lbs	Junior	Jacksonville, FL	Purdue	
Ondre Evans	#23	CB	6'0", 195 lbs	(redshirt) Freshman	Nashville, TN	NC State	
Dominick Kelly	#24	CB	6'1", 190 lbs	Freshman	Bradenton, FL	Ohio State	
Kris Jones	#28	LB	6'2", 230 lbs	(redshirt) Freshman	Fairfax, VA	Boston College	
Bo Hughley	#55	OT	6'7", 295 lbs	(redshirt) Sophomore	Fairburn, GA	Colorado	
Jamal Meriweather	#72	OT	6'7", 305 lbs	(redshirt) Sophomore	Brunswick, GA	Miami (FL)	
Nyier Daniels	#79	OT	6'8", 345 lbs	(redshirt) Freshman	Oradell, NJ	Tarleton State	
Jordan Thomas	#92	DL	6'5", 315 lbs	(redshirt) Freshman	Ramsey, NJ	South Carolina	

==== Incoming ====
Incoming transfers
Name	No.	Pos.	Height/weight	Year	Hometown	Prev. school	Sources
Isiah Canion	#6	WR	6'4", 215	Junior	Warner Robins, GA	Georgia Tech	
Khalil Barnes	#7	S	6'0", 200	Senior	Athens, GA	Clemson	
Ja'Marley Riddle	#12	S	6'0", 182	Junior	Kingsland, GA	East Carolina	
Amaris Williams	#17	OLB	6'2", 260	Junior	Clinton, NC	Auburn	
Bryson Beaver	#18	QB	6'2", 200	Freshman	Murrieta, CA	Oregon	
Dante Dowdell	#22	RB	6'2", 225	Senior	Picayune, MS	Kentucky	
Braylon Conley	#24	DB	6'0", 190	Junior	Humble, TX	USC	
Jake Bobo	#25	QB	6'0", 200	Sophomore	Athens, GA	Samford	
Gentry Williams	#26	DB	5'11", 187	Fifth Year	Tulsa, OK	Oklahoma	
TyQuez Richardson	#79	OL	6'5", 330	Junior	Atlanta, GA	Alabama A&M	
Brody Tolbert	#83	WR	6'1", 180	Sophomore	Bogart, GA	Samford	

=== Returning starters ===
Name	No.	Pos.	Hometown	Source
Gunner Stockton	#14	QB	Tiger, GA	
Nate Frazier	#3	RB	Compton, CA	
Lawson Luckie	#7	TE	Norcross, GA	
Dontrell Glover	#63	RG	Fairburn, GA	
Earnest Greene	#71	T	Los Angeles, CA	
Drew Bobo	#74	C	Athens, GA	
Jordan Hall	#44	DT	Jacksonville, FL	
Raylen Wilson	#5	LB	Tallahassee, FL	
Quintavius Johnson	#3	LB	Atlanta, GA	
Gabe Harris Jr.	#0	EDGE	Thomasville, GA	
KJ Bolden	#4	S	Buford, GA	
Kyron Jones	#31	S	Charlotte, NC	
Ellis Robinson IV	#1	CB	New Haven, CT	

=== SEC media days ===
==== Preseason media poll ====
Preseason polls were released on July 24, 2026.

SEC
Predicted finish	Team	Votes (1st place)
1	Georgia	2,519
2	Texas	2,449
3	Ole Miss	2,004
4	Texas A&M	1,967
5	LSU	1,961
6	Alabama	1,930
7	Oklahoma	1,914
8	Tennessee	1,320
9	Florida	1,217
10	Missouri	1,105
11	South Carolina	956
12	Auburn	936
13	Vanderbilt	751
14	Kentucky	546
15	Mississippi State	467
16	Arkansas	262

Media poll (SEC Championship)
Rank	Team	Votes
1	Georgia	88
2	Texas	57
3	Ole Miss	6
4	Texas A&M	5
5	Alabama	3
6	Oklahoma	2
7	LSU	2
8	Kentucky	1

=== G-Day ===
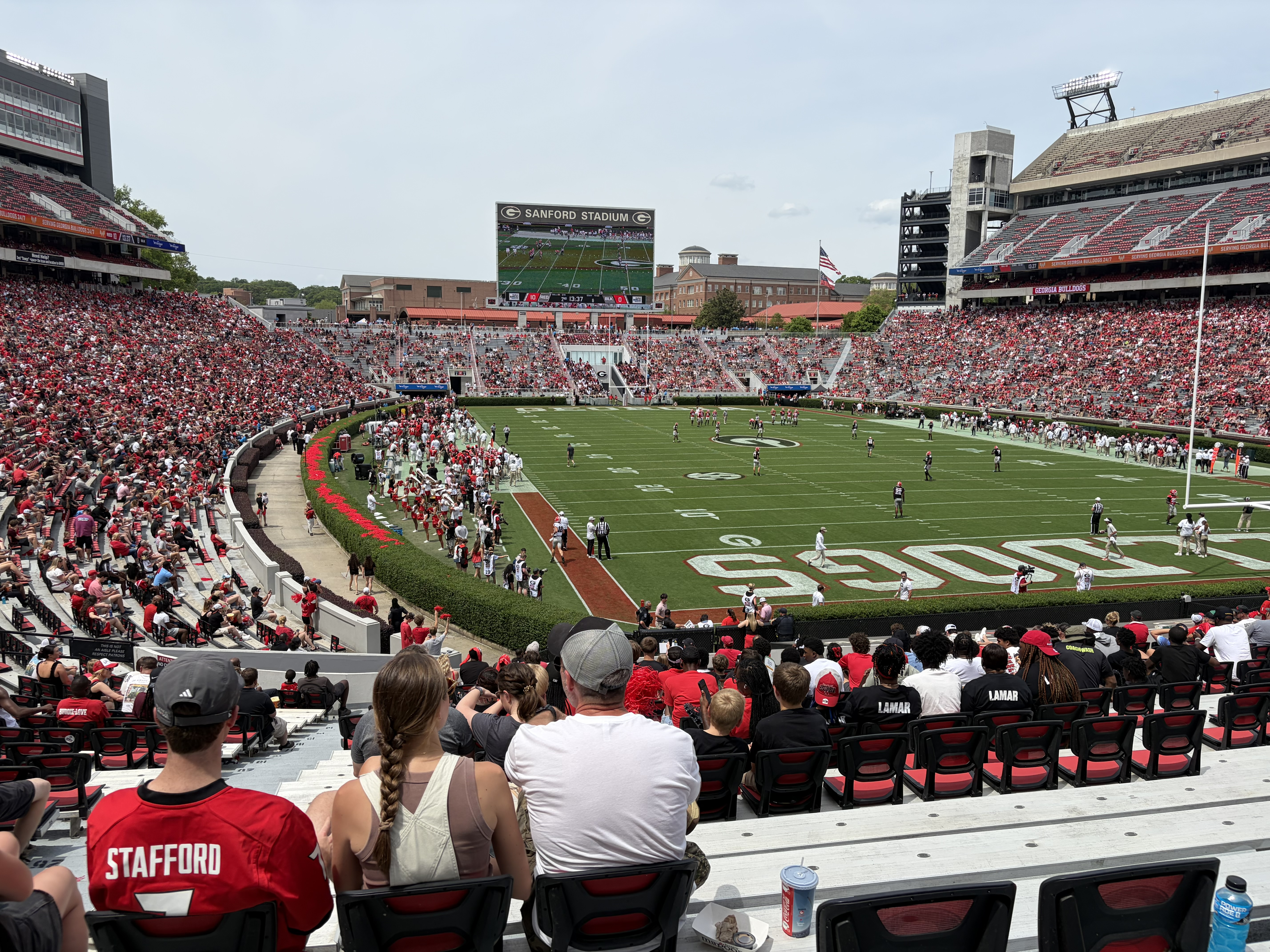
The Bulldogs' annual practice game known as "G-Day", April 2026

Georgia's final spring practice, annually open to the public and known as "G-Day", took place at 1:00 p.m. on April 18, 2026. The scrimmage was broadcast on ESPN+ and SECN+, with the Red team defeating the Black team by a score of 27–17.

2026 G-Day Spring Game

Quarter	1	2	3	4	Total
UGA Red	3	14	3	7	27
UGA Black	0	0	7	10	17

at Sanford Stadium, Athens, GA

- Date: April 18, 2026
- Game time: 1:00 p.m. EDT
- TV: ESPN+, SECN+

== Schedule ==
The Florida–Georgia game was held at Mercedes-Benz Stadium in Atlanta

On September 5, the Bulldogs played the Tennessee State Tigers for the first time in program history, winning 63–3.

On September 12, they played the Western Kentucky Hilltoppers for the second time, the first being a 48–12 victory in 2006; Georgia won 70–20. On September 26, the Bulldogs played Oklahoma for the second time in program history, the first time being the 2018 Rose Bowl where the Bulldogs prevailed 54–48 in double-overtime.

Due to renovations at EverBank Stadium, the rivalry game against Florida was not held in Jacksonville for the first time since 1995, instead being held at Mercedes-Benz Stadium in Atlanta.

Date	Time	Opponent	Rank	Site	TV	Result	Attendance
September 5	3:00 p.m.	Tennessee State*	No. 3	Sanford Stadium; Athens, GA	SECN+	W 63–3	93,033
September 12	12:45 p.m.	Western Kentucky*	No. 2	Sanford Stadium; Athens, GA	SECN	W 70–20	93,033
September 19	12:00 p.m.	at Arkansas	No. 2	Donald W. Reynolds Razorback Stadium; Fayetteville, AR	ABC	W 45–17	66,123
September 26	3:30 p.m.	Oklahoma	No. 2	Sanford Stadium; Athens, GA	ESPN	W 41–13	93,033
October 3	12:45 p.m.	Vanderbilt	No. 2	Sanford Stadium; Athens, GA (rivalry)	SECN	W 38–14	93,033
October 10	7:30 p.m.	at No. 6 Alabama	No. 2	Bryant–Denny Stadium; Tuscaloosa, AL (rivalry, College GameDay)	ABC	W 20–17	100,077
October 17	3:30 p.m.	Auburn	No. 1	Sanford Stadium; Athens, GA (Deep South's Oldest Rivalry)	ESPN	L 24–27	93,033
October 31	3:30 p.m.	vs. No. 17 Florida	No. 3	Mercedes-Benz Stadium; Atlanta, GA (rivalry, SEC Nation)	ABC	W 27–8	72,541
November 7	7:30 p.m.	at No. 10 Ole Miss	No. 2	Vaught–Hemingway Stadium; Oxford, MS (SEC Nation)	ABC	W 42–7	68,814
November 14	3:30 p.m.	No. 22 Missouri	No. 1	Sanford Stadium; Athens, GA (SEC Nation)	ABC	W 48–21	93,033
November 21	7:30 p.m.	at No. 21 South Carolina	No. 1	Williams–Brice Stadium; Columbia, SC (rivalry, SEC Nation)	ABC	W 34–6	79,105
November 28	3:30 p.m.	Georgia Tech*		Sanford Stadium; Athens, GA (Clean, Old-Fashioned Hate)	ABC		
December 5	4:00 p.m.	vs. Alabama/Tennessee/Texas		Mercedes-Benz Stadium; Atlanta, GA (SEC Championship Game, SEC Nation)	ABC		
*Non-conference game; Rankings from AP Poll (and CFP Rankings, after November 3) - Released prior to game; All times are in Eastern time

== Rankings ==
Ranking movements Legend: ██ Increase in ranking ██ Decrease in ranking ( ) = First-place votes
	Week															
Poll	Pre	1	2	3	4	5	6	7	8	9	10	11	12	13	14	Final
AP	3	2	2 (3)	2 (3)	2 (6)	2 (6)	1 (66)	5	3	2 (7)	1 (53)	1 (58)	1 (56)			
Coaches	3 (7)	2 (7)	2 (15)	2 (16)	2 (17)	2 (20)	1 (60)	4	3	2 (4)	1 (54)	1 (58)				
CFP	Not released									2	1	1				Not released

== Game summaries ==
=== Tennessee State (FCS) ===
Uniform combination
Helmet	Jersey	Pants

Georgia's first game of the season was against FCS opponent Tennessee State. Tennessee State had played its first game of the season the previous week in the John Merritt Classic against Jackson State, losing 26–24. Georgia paid Tennessee State $600,000 to play the game. Georgia won decisively 63–3.

Georgia received the opening kickoff and scored on its first drive when Nate Frazier ran 48 yards for a touchdown, the first of the season. Tennessee State went three-and-out on its opening possession before Frazier scored his second touchdown on a 14-yard run, giving Georgia a 14–0 lead. After another Tennessee State punt, Gunner Stockton threw a three-yard touchdown pass to Elyiss Williams to extend the lead to 21–0. On Georgia's next possession, Stockton connected with Talyn Taylor for an 11-yard touchdown, giving the Bulldogs a 28–0 lead at the end of the first quarter. Stockton opened the second quarter with a 14-yard touchdown pass to Jaden Reddell, his third touchdown pass of the game. After another Tiger punt, Tennessee State stopped Georgia's offense for the first time by forcing a turnover on downs. From there, the Tigers steadily moved the ball against the Georgia defense and scored their first points of the afternoon, on a 37-yard field goal by Preston Hurless. Georgia entered halftime leading 35–3.

The Tigers received the opening kickoff of the second half but were forced to punt after a three-play drive. Georgia responded with Frazier's third rushing touchdown of the game, a three-yard run that extended the lead to 42–3. On the Bulldogs' next possession, backup quarterback Ryan Puglisi threw a 16-yard touchdown pass to Kaiden Prothro, giving Georgia a 49–3 lead entering the fourth quarter. Georgia scored two more touchdowns in the fourth quarter, including a 54-yard touchdown pass from Ryan Montgomery to Jeremy Bell and an 11-yard touchdown run by Jae Lamar, to finish with a 63–3 victory.

Tennessee State Tigers (FCS) (0–1) at No. 3 Georgia Bulldogs (0–0) – Game summary

Quarter	1	2	3	4	Total
Tigers (FCS)	0	3	0	0	3
No. 3 Bulldogs	28	7	14	14	63

at Sanford Stadium • Athens, Georgia

- Date: September 5
- Game time: 3:00 p.m.
- Game weather: Sunny • Temperature: 101 °F (38 °C) • Wind: SE 2 mph (3.2 km/h)
- Game attendance: 93,033
- Referee: Adam Savoie
- TV announcers (SECN+): Clay Matvick, Rocky Boiman and Laura Stickells
- Report: Official report

Game information

First quarter

- (13:36) UGA – Nate Frazier 48-yard run, Peyton Woodring kick (Drive: 3 plays, 59 yards, 1:20; Georgia 7–0)
- (10:08) UGA – Nate Frazier 14-yard run, Peyton Woodring kick (Drive: 5 plays, 54 yards, 2:07; Georgia 14–0)
- (6:30) UGA – Elyiss Williams 17-yard pass from Gunner Stockton, Peyton Woodring kick (Drive: 3 plays, 63 yards, 1:31; Georgia 21–0)
- (2:08) UGA – Talyn Taylor 11-yard pass from Gunner Stockton, Peyton Woodring kick (Drive: 6 plays, 52 yards, 3:20; Georgia 28–0)

Second quarter

- (10:36) UGA – Jaden Reddell 14-yard pass from Gunner Stockton, Peyton Woodring kick (Drive: 7 plays, 82 yards, 4:15; Georgia 35–0)
- (2:08) TNST – Preston Hurless 37-yard field goal (Drive: 14 plays, 55 yards, 5:29; Georgia 35–3)

Third quarter

- (10:56) UGA – Nate Frazier 3-yard run, Peyton Woodring kick (Drive: 6 plays, 65 yards, 2:45; Georgia 42–3)
- (5:01) UGA – Kaiden Prothro 16-yard pass from Ryan Puglisi, Peyton Woodring kick (Drive: 9 plays, 85 yards, 3:39; Georgia 49–3)

Fourth quarter

- (13:38) UGA – Jeremy Bell 54-yard pass from Ryan Montgomery, Harran Zureikat kick (Drive: 4 plays, 71 yards, 2:12; Georgia 56–3)
- (8:57) UGA – Jae Lamar 11-yard run, Harran Zureikat kick (Drive: 7 plays, 59 yards, 3:47; Georgia 63–3)

Statistics	TNST	UGA
First downs	10	31
Plays–yards	58–109	60–660
Rushes–yards	32–10	27–272
Passing yards	99	388
Passing: comp–att–int	15–26–0	25–33–0
Turnovers	0	0
Time of possession	31:33	28:27

Team	Category	Player	Statistics
Tennessee State	Passing	Daylin Lee	11/19, 62 yards
Tennessee State	Rushing	Trevor Pearson	5 carries, 14 yards
Tennessee State	Receiving	Cam Bulluck	4 receptions, 28 yards
Georgia	Passing	Gunner Stockton	15/16, 202 yards, 3 TD
Georgia	Rushing	Nate Frazier	4 carries, 72 yards, 3 TD
Georgia	Receiving	Jeremy Bell	1 reception, 54 yards, TD

=== Western Kentucky ===
Sanford Stadium during Georgia's 2026 whiteout game

Uniform combination
Helmet	Jersey	Pants

Georgia, ranked No. 2 going into the game, wore white helmets, jerseys, and pants for the first time in program history, accompanied by a "whiteout" in the crowd. The Bulldogs paid Western Kentucky (WKU) $1.9 million for the matchup. Georgia defeated WKU 70–20.

On the opening kickoff, AJ Kruah forced a fumble that was recovered by Demello Jones, giving Georgia possession inside the WKU red zone. The Bulldogs converted the turnover into a touchdown when Gunner Stockton connected with Ethan Barbour for a 7-yard score. After a three-and-out by WKU, Nate Frazier rushed for a 7-yard touchdown to extend Georgia's lead to 14–0. Following another Hilltopper punt, Stockton found Chauncey Bowens for a 21-yard touchdown, with Bowens hurdling a defender on his way into the end zone to give Georgia a 21–0 lead with 7:37 remaining in the first quarter. WKU then advanced into Georgia territory, but Gabe Harris Jr. sacked quarterback Rodney Tisdale Jr. for a 9-yard loss, forcing the Hilltoppers to punt. Georgia responded with an 80-yard drive that ended with a touchdown reception by London Humphreys. After another WKU punt, Stockton found Sacovie White-Helton for a 70-yard touchdown. WKU then threw an interception, giving Georgia possession in Hilltopper territory, and Stockton threw his fifth touchdown pass of the game to Talyn Taylor. After another WKU fumble, Landon Roldan scored on a 9-yard run to give Georgia a 49–0 lead. WKU replaced Tisdale with Brock Glenn, who led the Hilltoppers to a first down before they were forced to punt. Georgia backup quarterback Ryan Puglisi then fumbled, and Glenn scored on a 15-yard run for WKU's first touchdown. Georgia led 49–6 at halftime.

Puglisi opened the second half with a 70-yard run, extending Georgia's lead to 56–6. Later in the quarter, a deflected pass was recovered by Georgia defender Blake Stewart, who returned it toward the end zone before fumbling. The ball was recovered by Tyriq Green in the endzone for a Georgia touchdown. After a series of punts, WKU put together a four-play, 64-yard drive that ended with another touchdown run by Glenn. On the ensuing kickoff, Green returned the ball 91 yards for a touchdown, Georgia's first kickoff return touchdown since 2016. WKU scored one more touchdown before the game ended with Georgia winning 70–20. Georgia's 70 points were its most in a game since 1994.

Western Kentucky Hilltoppers (0–1) at No. 2 Georgia Bulldogs (1–0) – Game summary

Quarter	1	2	3	4	Total
Hilltoppers	0	6	0	14	20
No. 2 Bulldogs	21	28	14	7	70

at Sanford Stadium • Athens, Georgia

- Date: September 12
- Game time: 12:45 p.m.
- Game weather: Rain • Temperature: 81 °F (27 °C) • Wind: SW 8 mph (13 km/h)
- Game attendance: 93,033
- Referee: David Smith
- TV announcers (SECN): Taylor Zarzour, Matt Stinchcomb and Michella Chester
- Report: Official report

Game information

First quarter

- (13:59) UGA – Ethan Barbour 7-yard pass from Gunner Stockton, Peyton Woodring kick (Drive: 2 plays, 18 yards, 0:55; Georgia 7–0)
- (11:28) UGA – Nate Frazier 7-yard run, Peyton Woodring kick (Drive: 2 plays, 50 yards, 0:51; Georgia 14–0)
- (7:37) UGA – Chauncey Bowens 21-yard pass from Gunner Stockton, Peyton Woodring kick (Drive: 7 plays, 64 yards, 3:21; Georgia 21–0)

Second quarter

- (13:28) UGA – London Humphreys 3-yard pass from Gunner Stockton, Peyton Woodring kick (Drive: 9 plays, 80 yards, 3:45; Georgia 28–0)
- (9:22) UGA – Sacovie White-Helton 70-yard pass from Gunner Stockton, Peyton Woodring kick (Drive: 3 plays, 78 yards, 1:26; Georgia 35–0)
- (7:44) UGA – Talyn Taylor 5-yard pass from Gunner Stockton, Peyton Woodring kick (Drive: 2 plays, 16 yards, 0:33; Georgia 42–0)
- (5:51) UGA – Landon Roldan 9-yard run, Peyton Woodring kick (Drive: 3 plays, 16 yards, 1:20; Georgia 49–0)
- (1:14) WKU – Brock Glenn 15-yard run, Michael Smith PAT failed (Drive: 3 plays, 16 yards, 1:20; Georgia 49–6)

Third quarter

- (14:04) UGA – Ryan Puglisi 70-yard run, Peyton Woodring kick (Drive: 3 plays, 84 yards, 0:52; Georgia 56–6)
- (4:17) UGA – Tyriq Green 0-yard fumble recovery, Peyton Woodring kick (Drive: 2 plays, 0 yards, 0:38; Georgia 63–6)

Fourth quarter

- (5:10) WKU – Brock Glenn 10-yard run, Karl Campbell kick (Drive: 4 plays, 64 yards, 1:46; Georgia 63–13)
- (4:57) UGA – Tyriq Green 91-yard kickoff return, Peyton Woodring kick (Drive: 1 play, 91 yards, 0:00; Georgia 70–13)
- (1:17) WKU – Coleson Arends 7-yard pass from Brock Glenn, Karl Campbell kick (Drive: 4 plays, 23 yards, 1:03; Georgia 70–20)

Statistics	WKU	UGA
First downs	17	18
Plays–yards	74–225	60–493
Rushes–yards	37–110	35–234
Passing yards	115	259
Passing: comp–att–int	18–37–2	16–25–0
Turnovers	4	2
Time of possession	31:06	28:54

Team	Category	Player	Statistics
Western Kentucky	Passing	Brock Glenn	12/23, 84 yards, TD, INT
Western Kentucky	Rushing	Brock Glenn	13 carries, 70 yards, 2 TD
Western Kentucky	Receiving	Quincy Burroughs	2 receptions, 29 yards
Georgia	Passing	Gunner Stockton	13/16, 234 yards, 5 TD
Georgia	Rushing	Ryan Puglisi	2 carries, 79 yards, TD
Georgia	Receiving	Sacovie White-Helton	1 reception, 70 yards, TD

=== at Arkansas ===
Uniform combination
Helmet	Jersey	Pants

This was the 17th matchup between Arkansas and Georgia, with UGA leading 12–4 going into the game. Arkansas head coach Ryan Silverfield is in his first year with the Razorbacks.

No. 2 Georgia Bulldogs (2–0) at Arkansas Razorbacks (1–1) – Game summary

Quarter	1	2	3	4	Total
No. 2 Bulldogs	7	14	10	14	45
Razorbacks	0	3	0	14	17

at Donald W. Reynolds Razorback Stadium • Fayetteville, Arkansas

- Date: September 19
- Game time: 12:00 p.m.
- Game weather: Sunny • Temperature: 88 °F (31 °C) • Wind: NE 8 mph (13 km/h)
- Game attendance: 66,123
- Referee: Steve Marlowe
- TV announcers (ABC): Dave Pasch, Dusty Dvoracek and Taylor McGregor
- Report: Official report

Game information

First quarter

- (6:53) UGA – Nate Frazier 5-yard run, Peyton Woodring kick (Drive: 6 plays, 62 yards, 3:43; Georgia 7–0)

Second quarter

- (8:45) UGA – Chauncey Bowens 2-yard run, Peyton Woodring kick (Drive: 10 plays, 75 yards, 6:08; Georgia 14–0)
- (0:36) UGA – Chauncey Bowens 5-yard run, Peyton Woodring kick (Drive: 8 plays, 93 yards, 3:52; Georgia 21–0)
- (0:02) ARK – Max Gilbert 41-yard field goal (Drive: 6 plays, 61 yards, 0:34; Georgia 21–3)

Third quarter

- (9:02) UGA – Peyton Woodring 38-yard field goal (Drive: 10 plays, 55 yards, 5:58; Georgia 24–3)
- (3:35) UGA – Chauncey Bowens 1-yard run, Peyton Woodring kick (Drive: 8 plays, 32 yards, 4:23; Georgia 31–3)

Fourth quarter

- (12:42) UGA – Craig Dandridge 61-yard pass from Gunner Stockton, Peyton Woodring kick (Drive: 1 play, 61 yards, 0:10; Georgia 38–3)
- (8:30) ARK – Sutton Smith 5-yard run, Max Gilbert kick (Drive: 12 plays, 75 yards, 4:12; Georgia 38–10)
- (2:31) UGA – Lawson Luckie 2-yard pass from Ryan Puglisi, Peyton Woodring kick (Drive: 11 plays, 75 yards, 5:59; Georgia 45–10)
- (0:40) ARK – Ty Lockwood 2-yard pass from KJ Jackson, Max Gilbert kick (Drive: 9 plays, 75 yards, 1:51; Georgia 45–17)

Statistics	UGA	ARK
First downs	23	18
Plays–yards	63–464	62–300
Rushes–yards	42–254	20–17
Passing yards	210	283
Passing: comp–att–int	17–21–0	29–42–0
Turnovers	0	1
Time of possession	35:40	24:20

Team	Category	Player	Statistics
Georgia	Passing	Gunner Stockton	10/13, 147 yards, TD
Georgia	Rushing	Gunner Stockton	7 carries, 97 yards
Georgia	Receiving	Craig Dandridge	3 receptions, 74 yards, TD
Arkansas	Passing	KJ Jackson	20/27, 212 yards, TD
Arkansas	Rushing	Sutton Smith	6 carries, 17 yards, TD
Arkansas	Receiving	Chris Marshall	7 receptions, 104 yards

=== Oklahoma ===
Uniform combination
Helmet	Jersey	Pants

Coming into the game, the Bulldogs had faced the Sooners only once, at the 2018 Rose Bowl; Georgia won that matchup 54–48.

Oklahoma Sooners (2–1) at No. 2 Georgia Bulldogs (3–0) – Game summary

Quarter	1	2	3	4	Total
Sooners	0	0	6	7	13
No. 2 Bulldogs	7	21	3	10	41

at Sanford Stadium • Athens, Georgia

- Date: September 26
- Game time: 3:30 p.m.
- Game weather: Sunny • Temperature: 81 °F (27 °C) • Wind: W at 4 miles per hour (6.4 km/h)
- Game attendance: 93,033
- Referee: Adam Savoie
- TV announcers (ESPN): Bob Wischusen (play-by-play), Louis Riddick (analyst), and Stormy Buonantony (sideline)
- Report: Official report

Game information

First quarter

- (3:16) UGA – Chauncey Bowens 2-yard run, Peyton Woodring kick (Drive: 11 plays, 79 yards, 6:56; Georgia 7–0)

Second quarter

- (14:20) UGA – Talyn Taylor 35-yard pass from Gunner Stockton, Peyton Woodring kick (Drive: 5 plays, 54 yards, 2:11; Georgia 14–0)
- (9:14) UGA – Chris Cole 85-yard fumble recovery, Peyton Woodring kick (Georgia 21–0)
- (0:57) UGA – Chauncey Bowens 6-yard run, Peyton Woodring kick (Drive: 2 plays, 11 yards, 0:51; Georgia 28–0)

Third quarter

- (10:26) OU – Rocky Beers 17-yard pass from John Mateer, Two-point conversion try failed (Drive: 5 plays, 34 yards, 2:13; Georgia 28–6)
- (7:58) UGA – Peyton Woodring 45-yard field goal (Drive: 4 plays, 1 yard, 0:52; Georgia 31–6)

Fourth quarter

- (12:33) UGA – Dwight Phillips Jr. 54-yard run, Peyton Woodring kick (Drive: 4 plays, 81 yards, 1:38; Georgia 38–6)
- (8:13) UGA – Peyton Woodring 49-yard field goal (Drive: 5 plays, 36 yards, 1:59; Georgia 41–6)
- (3:23) OU – Manny Choice 14-yard pass from John Mateer, Tate Sandell kick (Drive: 9 plays, 75 yards, 4:50; Georgia 41–13)

Statistics	OU	UGA
First downs	16	12
Plays–yards	69−296	53−307
Rushes–yards	35−65	26−130
Passing yards	231	177
Passing: comp–att–int	25−34−1	15−27−1
Turnovers	4	2
Time of possession	35:27	24:33

Team	Category	Player	Statistics
Oklahoma	Passing	John Mateer	25/34, 231 yards, 2 TD, INT
Oklahoma	Rushing	Lloyd Avant	10 carries, 23 yards
Oklahoma	Receiving	Rocky Beers	8 receptions, 84 yards, TD
Georgia	Passing	Gunner Stockton	14/25, 171 yards, TD, INT
Georgia	Rushing	Dwight Phillips Jr.	8 carries, 84 yards, TD
Georgia	Receiving	Talyn Taylor	4 receptions, 110 yards, TD

=== Vanderbilt (rivalry) ===
Uniform combination
Helmet	Jersey	Pants

Georgia and Vanderbilt have a long history and an ongoing rivalry. The teams had met 83 times since 1893, with the Bulldogs leading 61–20–2.

The week before the game, Georgia coach Kirby Smart said Vanderbilt coach Clark Lea is "super intelligent," and credited him with building "a great program, a great team."

Vanderbilt Commodores (3–1) at No. 2 Georgia Bulldogs (4–0) – Game summary

Quarter	1	2	3	4	Total
Commodores	7	7	0	0	14
No. 2 Bulldogs	7	14	7	10	38

at Sanford Stadium • Athens, Georgia

- Date: October 3
- Game time: 12:45 p.m.
- Game weather: Cloudy • Temperature: 79 °F (26 °C) • Wind: SW at 3 miles per hour (4.8 km/h)
- Game attendance: 93,033
- Referee: Jeff Heaser
- TV announcers (SECN): Matt Schumacker, Aaron Murray, and Taylor Davis
- Report: Official report

Game information

First quarter

- (6:57) UGA – Landon Roldan 2-yard pass from Gunner Stockton, Peyton Woodring kick (Drive: 10 plays, 80 yards, 5:30; Georgia 7–0)
- (0:12) VAN – Junior Sherrill 60-yard pass from Blaze Berlowitz, Brock Taylor kick (Drive: 7 plays, 95 yards, 4:23; Tied 7–7)

Second quarter

- (14:29) UGA – Chauncey Bowens 1-yard run, Peyton Woodring kick (Drive: 3 plays, 75 yards, 0:43; Georgia 14–7)
- (3:58) UGA – Jaden Reddell 1-yard run, Peyton Woodring kick (Drive: 8 plays, 60 yards, 3:35; Georgia 21–7)
- (0:31) VAN – Sedrick Alexander 2-yard run, Brock Taylor kick (Drive: 10 plays, 73 yards, 3:27; Georgia 21–14)

Third quarter

- (8:21) UGA – Elyiss Williams 1-yard pass from Gunner Stockton, Peyton Woodring kick (Drive: 11 plays, 75 yards, 6:39; Georgia 28–14)

Fourth quarter

- (12:27) UGA – Peyton Woodring 39-yard field goal (Drive: 9 plays, 38 yards, 3:54; Georgia 31–14)
- (6:02) UGA – Dwight Phillips Jr. 12-yard pass from Gunner Stockton, Peyton Woodring kick (Drive: 12 plays, 70 yards, 6:14; Georgia 38–14)

Statistics	VAN	UGA
First downs	13	26
Plays–yards	51−293	66−471
Rushes–yards	26−85	34−176
Passing yards	208	295
Passing: comp–att–int	14−25−1	25−32−0
Turnovers	1	0
Time of possession	27:12	32:48

Team	Category	Player	Statistics
Vanderbilt	Passing	Blaze Berlowitz	12/23, 190 yards, TD, INT
Vanderbilt	Rushing	Blaze Berlowitz	8 carries, 37 yards
Vanderbilt	Receiving	Junior Sherrill	7 receptions, 107 yards, TD
Georgia	Passing	Gunner Stockton	25/32, 295 yards, 3 TD
Georgia	Rushing	Bo Walker	5 carries, 71 yards
Georgia	Receiving	Dwight Phillips Jr.	5 receptions, 75 yards, TD

=== at No. 6 Alabama (rivalry) ===
Uniform combination
Helmet	Jersey	Pants

Both Alabama and Georgia were undefeated this season going into the weekend. Due to expected severe weather from Hurricane Isaias, several pregame events were postponed or cancelled, including the planned attendance of President Donald Trump. Georgia won 20–17, defeating Alabama in the regular season for the first time since 2007. It was also Georgia's first win in Tuscaloosa since 2007 and the first time the Bulldogs had defeated Alabama in consecutive meetings since 2003 and 2007.

On the opening drive, Alabama advanced into Georgia territory before Keelon Russell was sacked by Joseph Jonah-Ajonye and fumbled. Quintavius Johnson recovered the ball for Georgia, which capitalized on the turnover with a 43-yard field goal by Peyton Woodring to take a 3–0 lead. Alabama advanced into Georgia territory on its next drive but was forced to punt. The teams then traded three-play drives that ended in punts. Starting at its own 7-yard line, Georgia drove 93 yards for a touchdown, aided by a 53-yard pass to Jaden Reddell and capped by a 20-yard touchdown pass from Gunner Stockton to London Humphreys. Alabama responded with an 89-yard drive in three plays, ending with Russell's 22-yard touchdown pass to Marshall Pritchett. Stockton threw an interception on the first play of Georgia's next drive, but the Bulldogs' defense forced a stop. After another Georgia punt, Alabama drove to the goal line in the final seconds of the first half and scored on a run by EJ Crowell to take a 14–10 lead into halftime.

Georgia received the second-half kickoff and regained the lead when Stockton ran for his first rushing touchdown of the season. Alabama tied the game at 17–17 with a 39-yard field goal by Connor Talty, capping a 54-yard drive that took 5 minutes and 31 seconds. Georgia moved into scoring position on a 31-yard run by Dwight Phillips Jr. and a pass-interference penalty on third-and-21, but Woodring missed a 39-yard field goal, his first miss of the season. On Alabama's next drive, Russell scrambled for 22 yards to move the Crimson Tide into Georgia territory, but the drive stalled. Georgia then drove 84 yards, highlighted by a 22-yard run by Phillips and a 37-yard run by Bo Walker. Woodring made a 23-yard field goal to give the Bulldogs a 20–17 lead. Alabama attempted to respond, but Russell was sacked by KJ Bolden and Valdin Sone, pushing the Crimson Tide out of field-goal range. Alabama punted with three timeouts remaining. On third-and-seven, Stockton completed a 17-yard pass to Elyiss Williams to extend Georgia's drive. Alabama's Dijon Lee Jr. was then penalized for a personal foul after making contact with Craig Dandridge's face. The penalty gave Georgia a first down, and the Bulldogs ran out the clock to secure the 20–17 victory.

No. 2 Georgia Bulldogs (5–0) at No. 6 Alabama Crimson Tide (5–0) – Game summary

Quarter	1	2	3	4	Total
No. 2 Bulldogs	3	7	7	3	20
No. 6 Crimson Tide	0	14	3	0	17

at Bryant–Denny Stadium • Tuscaloosa, Alabama

- Date: October 10
- Game time: 7:30 p.m.
- Game weather: Cloudy • Temperature: 61 °F (16 °C) • Wind: E at 6 miles per hour (9.7 km/h)
- Game attendance: 100,077
- Referee: Kyle Olson
- TV announcers (ABC, College GameDay): Chris Fowler, Kirk Herbstreit, Holly Rowe, and Laura Rutledge
- Report: Official report

Game information

First quarter

- (3:25) UGA – Peyton Woodring 43-yard field goal (Drive: 7 plays, 36 yards, 4:15; Georgia 3–0)

Second quarter

- (7:09) UGA – London Humphreys 20-yard pass from Gunner Stockton, Peyton Woodring kick (Drive: 9 plays, 93 yards, 5:08; Georgia 10–0)
- (5:49) ALA – Marshall Pritchett 22-yard pass from Keelon Russell, Connor Talty kick (Drive: 3 plays, 89 yards, 1:12; Georgia 10–7)
- (0:03) ALA – EJ Crowell 1-yard run, Connor Talty kick (Drive: 12 plays, 80 yards, 1:42; Alabama 14–10)

Third quarter

- (10:38) UGA – Gunner Stockton 14-yard run, Peyton Woodring kick (Drive: 8 plays, 75 yards, 4:22; Georgia 17–14)
- (5:07) ALA – Connor Talty 39-yard field goal (Drive: 10 plays, 54 yards, 5:31; Tied 17–17)

Fourth quarter

- (5:25) UGA – Peyton Woodring 23-yard field goal (Drive: 10 plays, 84 yards, 5:19; Georgia 20–17)

Statistics	UGA	ALA
First downs	21	17
Plays–yards	61−455	60−346
Rushes–yards	39−206	29−161
Passing yards	249	185
Passing: comp–att–int	18−22−1	16−31−0
Turnovers	1	1
Time of possession	33:28	26:32

Team	Category	Player	Statistics
Georgia	Passing	Gunner Stockton	18/22, 249 yards, TD, INT
Georgia	Rushing	Dwight Phillips Jr.	17 carries, 120 yards
Georgia	Receiving	Jaden Reddell	1 reception, 53 yards
Alabama	Passing	Keelon Russell	16/31, 185 yards, TD
Alabama	Rushing	Trae'shawn Brown	9 carries, 90 yards
Alabama	Receiving	Ryan Coleman-Williams	3 receptions, 39 yards

=== Auburn (Deep South's Oldest Rivalry) ===
Uniform combination
Helmet	Jersey	Pants

Auburn Tigers (3–2) at No. 1 Georgia Bulldogs (6–0) – Game summary

Quarter	1	2	3	4	Total
Tigers	7	10	7	3	27
No. 1 Bulldogs	14	0	0	10	24

at Sanford Stadium • Athens, Georgia

- Date: October 17
- Game time: 3:30 p.m.
- Game weather: Sunny • Temperature: 70 °F (21 °C) • Wind: NE at 13 miles per hour (21 km/h)
- Game attendance: 93,033
- Referee: Daniel Gautreaux
- TV announcers (ESPN): Dave Pasch, Dusty Dvoracek, and Taylor McGregor
- Report: Official report

Game information

First quarter

- (12:03) UGA – Dwight Phillips Jr. 54-yard run, Peyton Woodring kick (Drive: 4 plays, 75 yards, 2:57; Georgia 7–0)
- (6:49) UGA – Lawson Luckie 24-yard pass from Gunner Stockton, Peyton Woodring kick (Drive: 7 plays, 89 yards, 3:25; Georgia 14–0)
- (3:07) AUB – Keshaun Singleton 24-yard pass from Christian Neptune, Alex McPherson kick (Drive: 9 plays, 75 yards, 3:42; Georgia 14–7)

Second quarter

- (6:32) AUB – Chas Nimrod 9-yard pass from Byrum Brown, Alex McPherson kick (Drive: 11 plays, 64 yards, 4:06; Tied 14–14)
- (1:20) AUB – Alex McPherson 49-yard field goal (Drive: 10 plays, 33 yards, 3:10; Auburn 17–14)

Third quarter

- (11:28) AUB – Byrum Brown 5-yard run, Alex McPherson kick (Drive: 9 plays, 76 yards, 3:27; Auburn 24–14)

Fourth quarter

- (14:15) UGA – Peyton Woodring 42-yard field goal (Drive: 14 plays, 49 yards, 7:02; Auburn 24–17)
- (2:58) UGA – London Humphreys 4-yard pass from Gunner Stockton, Peyton Woodring kick (Drive: 13 plays, 94 yards, 5:16; Tied 24–24)
- (0:00) AUB – Alex McPherson 34-yard field goal (Drive: 5 plays, 40 yards, 0:58; Auburn 27–24)

Statistics	AUB	UGA
First downs	23	24
Plays–yards	74–366	65–440
Rushes–yards	46–192	28–113
Passing yards	174	327
Passing: comp–att–int	16–28–0	25–37–2
Turnovers	0	3
Time of possession	29:33	30:27

Team	Category	Player	Statistics
Auburn	Passing	Byrum Brown	15/26, 150 yards, TD
Auburn	Rushing	Byrum Brown	26 rushes, 115 yards, TD
Auburn	Receiving	Chas Nimrod	6 receptions, 60 yards, TD
Georgia	Passing	Gunner Stockton	22/34, 272 yards, 2 TD, 2 INT
Georgia	Rushing	Dwight Phillips Jr.	10 rushes, 68 yards, TD
Georgia	Receiving	Craig Dandridge	4 receptions, 88 yards

=== vs. No. 17 Florida (rivalry) ===
Uniform combination
Helmet	Jersey	Pants

No. 17 Florida Gators (5–2) vs. No. 3 Georgia Bulldogs (6–1) – Game summary

Quarter	1	2	3	4	Total
No. 17 Gators	0	0	0	8	8
No. 3 Bulldogs	7	17	0	3	27

at Mercedes-Benz Stadium • Atlanta, Georgia

- Date: October 31
- Game time: 3:30 p.m.
- Game weather: Indoors • Temperature: 71 °F (22 °C) • Wind: E at 13 miles per hour (21 km/h)
- Game attendance: 72,541
- Referee: Steve Marlowe
- TV announcers (ABC): Chris Fowler, Kirk Herbstreit, and Holly Rowe
- Report: Official report

Game information

First quarter

- (1:50) UGA – Nate Frazier 1-yard run, Peyton Woodring kick (Drive: 8 plays, 41 yards, 4:12; Georgia 7–0)

Second quarter

- (8:55) UGA – Peyton Woodring 28-yard field goal (Drive: 4 plays, 7 yards, 2:04; Georgia 10–0)
- (1:55) UGA – Bo Walker 1-yard run, Peyton Woodring kick (Drive: 10 plays, 81 yards, 4:17; Georgia 17–0)
- (0:29) UGA – Chris Cole 66-yard fumble recovery, Peyton Woodring kick (Georgia 24–0)

Third quarter

No scoring plays

Fourth quarter

- (6:59) FLA – Tramell Jones Jr. 2-yard run, Jadan Baugh pass to Dallas Wilson (Drive: 9 plays, 48 yards, 4:12; Georgia 24–8)
- (3:34) UGA – Peyton Woodring 21-yard field goal (Drive: 9 plays, 61 yards, 3:26; Georgia 27–8)

Statistics	FLA	UGA
First downs	15	19
Plays–yards	60–246	65–318
Rushes–yards	28–48	42–217
Passing yards	198	101
Passing: comp–att–int	23−32−3	13−23−0
Turnovers	4	1
Time of possession	27:50	32:11

Team	Category	Player	Statistics
Florida	Passing	Tramell Jones Jr.	18/25, 172 yards, INT
Florida	Rushing	Jadan Baugh	17 rushes, 38 yards
Florida	Receiving	Bailey Stockton	8 receptions, 76 yards
Georgia	Passing	Gunner Stockton	13/23, 101 yards
Georgia	Rushing	Nate Frazier; Dwight Phillips Jr.	12 rushes, 67 yards, TD; 8 rushes, 67 yards
Georgia	Receiving	Craig Dandridge	3 receptions, 39 yards

=== at No. 10 Ole Miss ===
Uniform combination
Helmet	Jersey	Pants

No. 2 Georgia Bulldogs (7–1) at No. 10 Ole Miss Rebels (6–2) – Game summary

Quarter	1	2	3	4	Total
No. 2 Bulldogs	14	14	7	7	42
No. 10 Rebels	0	0	0	7	7

at Vaught–Hemingway Stadium • Oxford, Mississippi

- Date: November 7
- Game time: 7:30 p.m.
- Game weather: Cloudy • Temperature: 47 °F (8 °C) • Wind: N 2 miles per hour (3.2 km/h)
- Game attendance: 68,814
- Referee: James Carter
- TV announcers (ABC): Sean McDonough, Greg McElroy, and Katie George
- Report: Official report

Game information

First quarter

- (10:16) UGA – Craig Dandridge 4-yard run, Peyton Woodring kick (Drive: 7 plays, 72 yards, 4:00; Georgia 7–0)
- (6:18) UGA – Talyn Taylor 58-yard pass from Gunner Stockton, Peyton Woodring kick (Drive: 4 plays, 96 yards, 2:11; Georgia 14–0)

Second quarter

- (14:16) UGA – Ethan Barbour 3-yard pass from Gunner Stockton, Peyton Woodring kick (Drive: 9 plays, 61 yards, 4:43; Georgia 21–0)
- (2:42) UGA – Gunner Stockton 15-yard run, Peyton Woodring kick (Drive: 7 plays, 50 yards, 3:47; Georgia 28–0)

Third quarter

- (1:37) UGA – Talyn Taylor 6-yard pass from Gunner Stockton, Peyton Woodring kick (Drive: 5 plays, 22 yards, 2:58; Georgia 35–0)

Fourth quarter

- (10:43) MISS – Shekai Mills-Knight 8-yard run, Lucas Carneiro kick (Drive: 16 plays, 75 yards, 5:54; Georgia 35–7)
- (9:06) UGA – Talyn Taylor 65-yard pass from Gunner Stockton, Peyton Woodring kick (Drive: 3 plays, 75 yards, 1:37; Georgia 42–7)

Statistics	UGA	MISS
First downs	23	19
Plays–yards	63–481	69–252
Rushes–yards	48–295	31–66
Passing yards	186	186
Passing: comp–att–int	9−15−0	21−38−1
Turnovers	0	2
Time of possession	34:41	25:19

Team	Category	Player	Statistics
Georgia	Passing	Gunner Stockton	9/15, 186 yards, 4 TD
Georgia	Rushing	Nate Frazier	16 rushes, 107 yards
Georgia	Receiving	Talyn Taylor	4 receptions, 140 yards, 3 TD
Ole Miss	Passing	Trinidad Chambliss	18/34, 170 yards, INT
Ole Miss	Rushing	Shekai Mills-Knight	13 rushes, 52 yards, TD
Ole Miss	Receiving	Horatio Fields	8 receptions, 96 yards

=== No. 22 Missouri ===
Uniform combination
Helmet	Jersey	Pants

Georgia and Missouri met for the first time since 2023. Before the series hiatus, the teams had played annually since Missouri joined the SEC in 2012. With the 48–21 victory, Georgia improved its all-time record against Missouri to 13–1 and extended its winning streak in the series to 11 games. Missouri has defeated Georgia just once since joining the SEC.

Missouri received the opening kickoff after Georgia won the coin toss and elected to defer to the second half. On the first play from scrimmage, Austin Simmons threw an interception to Raylen Wilson, who returned it to the Missouri 7-yard line. The Bulldogs capitalized on the turnover two plays later with a 4-yard touchdown run by Nate Frazier. Following a Missouri punt, a 15-yard run by Frazier and a 33-yard completion from Gunner Stockton to Isiah Canion moved Georgia into the red zone. Stockton then scored on an 8-yard touchdown run to give the Bulldogs a 14–0 lead. Missouri picked up its first first down of the game on the ensuing possession but was forced to punt. Georgia then drove 87 yards, capped by Frazier's 3-yard touchdown run. After another Missouri punt, the Bulldogs extended their lead with a 41-yard field goal by Peyton Woodring. Georgia added another touchdown when Stockton connected with Canion for a 12-yard score, the receiver's first of the season and his first as a Bulldog. Missouri responded with its first score of the game as Simmons found Naeshaun Montgomery for a touchdown. Georgia took a commanding 31–7 lead into halftime.

Sacovie White-Helton opened the second half with a 58-yard kickoff return, setting up a 40-yard field goal by Woodring. Following another Missouri punt, Georgia put together an 85-yard drive that ended with Frazier's third rushing touchdown of the afternoon. The Tigers responded with a 74-yard drive, capped by a touchdown reception from Donovan Olugbode. Georgia answered on its next possession as Chauncey Bowens scored on a 5-yard toss sweep, his only carry of the game. Missouri then mounted an 81-yard drive that took 7:32 off the clock, with Simmons throwing his third touchdown pass of the game to cut the deficit to 48–21. After the teams exchanged punts, Georgia muffed a punt and Missouri recovered the ball. However, the Tigers failed to capitalize on the turnover, as Blake Craig missed a 29-yard field goal. Georgia then ran out the remaining clock to secure the 48–21 victory.

No. 22 Missouri Tigers (6–3) at No. 1 Georgia Bulldogs (8–1) – Game summary

Quarter	1	2	3	4	Total
No. 22 Tigers	0	7	7	7	21
No. 1 Bulldogs	21	10	10	7	48

at Sanford Stadium • Athens, Georgia

- Date: November 14
- Game time: 3:30 p.m.
- Game weather: Sunny • Temperature: 57 °F (14 °C) • Wind: NW 9 miles per hour (14 km/h)
- Game attendance: 93,033
- Referee: Ted Pitts
- TV announcers (ABC): Sean McDonough, Greg McElroy, and Katie George
- Report: Official report

Game information

First quarter

- (13:59) UGA – Nate Frazier 4-yard run, Peyton Woodring kick (Drive: 2 plays, 7 yards, 0:45; Georgia 7–0)
- (10:33) UGA – Gunner Stockton 8-yard run, Peyton Woodring kick (Drive: 4 plays, 60 yards, 2:00; Georgia 14–0)
- (2:03) UGA – Nate Frazier 3-yard run, Peyton Woodring kick (Drive: 11 plays, 87 yards, 5:58; Georgia 21–0)

Second quarter

- (10:43) UGA – Peyton Woodring 41-yard field goal (Drive: 10 plays, 51 yards, 5:31; Georgia 24–0)
- (6:52) UGA – Isiah Canion 12-yard pass from Gunner Stockton, Peyton Woodring kick (Drive: 5 plays, 61 yards, 2:21; Georgia 31–0)
- (3:05) MIZ – Naeshaun Montgomery 15-yard pass from Austin Simmons, Blake Craig kick (Drive: 8 plays, 75 yards, 3:42; Georgia 31–7)

Third quarter

- (10:42) UGA – Peyton Woodring 40-yard field goal (Drive: 7 plays, 15 yards, 4:11; Georgia 34–7)
- (6:15) UGA – Nate Frazier 3-yard run, Peyton Woodring kick (Drive: 6 plays, 85 yards, 3:29; Georgia 41–7)
- (0:45) MIZ – Donovan Olugbode 11-yard pass from Austin Simmons, Blake Craig kick (Drive: 11 plays, 74 yards, 5:23; Georgia 41–14)

Fourth quarter

- (12:53) UGA – Chauncey Bowens 5-yard run, Peyton Woodring kick (Drive: 6 plays, 75 yards, 2:52; Georgia 48–14)
- (5:15) MIZ – Kenric Lanier 2-yard pass from Austin Simmons, Blake Craig kick (Drive: 13 plays, 81 yards, 7:32; Georgia 48–21)

Statistics	MIZ	UGA
First downs	15	23
Plays–yards	61–286	60–468
Rushes–yards	32–102	34–182
Passing yards	184	286
Passing: comp–att–int	18−29−1	20−26−0
Turnovers	1	1
Time of possession	27:58	32:02

Team	Category	Player	Statistics
Missouri	Passing	Austin Simmons	17/25, 175 yards, 3 TD, INT
Missouri	Rushing	Jamal Roberts	19 rushes, 62 yards
Missouri	Receiving	Donovan Olugbode	4 receptions, 67 yards, TD
Georgia	Passing	Gunner Stockton	18/24, 252 yards, TD
Georgia	Rushing	Nate Frazier	14 rushes, 72 yards, 3 TD
Georgia	Receiving	Craig Dandridge	6 receptions, 85 yards

=== at No. 21 South Carolina (rivalry) ===
Uniform combination
Helmet	Jersey	Pants

No. 1 Georgia Bulldogs (9–1) at No. 21 South Carolina Gamecocks (6–4) – Game summary

Quarter	1	2	3	4	Total
No. 1 Bulldogs	3	7	10	14	34
No. 21 Gamecocks	3	3	0	0	6

at Williams–Brice Stadium • Columbia, South Carolina

- Date: November 21
- Game time: 7:30 p.m.
- Game attendance: 79,105
- Referee: Daniel Gautreaux
- TV announcers (ABC): Chris Fowler, Kirk Herbstreit and Laura Rutledge

Game information

First quarter

- (9:23) SC – Malik Orsan 31-yard field goal (Drive: 12 plays, 62 yards, 5:37; South Carolina 3–0)
- (2:34) UGA – Peyton Woodring 25-yard field goal (Drive: 13 plays, 69 yards, 6:44; Tied 3–3)

Second quarter

- (14:51) SC – Malik Orsan 32-yard field goal (Drive: 7 plays, 61 yards, 2:43; South Carolina 6–3)
- (1:56) UGA – Nate Frazier 1-yard run, Peyton Woodring kick (Drive: 10 plays, 88 yards, 4:52; Georgia 10–6)

Third quarter

- (11:07) UGA – Nate Frazier 2-yard run, Peyton Woodring kick (Drive: 6 plays, 75 yards, 3:53; Georgia 17–6)
- (5:33) UGA – Peyton Woodring 40-yard field goal (Drive: 4 plays, -1 yard, 1:23; Georgia 20–6)

Fourth quarter

- (9:11) UGA – Craig Dandridge 14-yard pass from Gunner Stockton, Peyton Woodring kick (Drive: 11 plays, 91 yards, 6:13; Georgia 27–6)
- (1:03) UGA – Nick Peal 1-yard run, Peyton Woodring kick (Drive: 12 plays, 69 yards, 7:08; Georgia 34–6)

Statistics	UGA	SC
First downs	24	15
Plays–yards	65–421	49–218
Rushes–yards	42–140	31–131
Passing yards	281	87
Passing: comp–att–int	19−23−0	10−18−1
Turnovers	0	1
Time of possession	37:17	22:43

Team	Category	Player	Statistics
Georgia	Passing	Gunner Stockton	19/23, 281 yards, TD
Georgia	Rushing	Nate Frazier	23 rushes, 94 yards, 2 TD
Georgia	Receiving	Jaden Reddell	3 receptions, 85 yards
South Carolina	Passing	LaNorris Sellers	10/18, 87 yards, INT
South Carolina	Rushing	Jabree Coleman	10 rushes, 44 yards
South Carolina	Receiving	DJ Black	1 reception, 34 yards

=== Georgia Tech (Clean, Old-Fashioned Hate) ===
Georgia Tech Yellow Jackets (3–8) at Georgia Bulldogs (10–1) – Game summary

Quarter	1	2	3	4	Total
Yellow Jackets	0	0	0	0	0
Bulldogs	0	0	0	0	0

at Sanford Stadium • Athens, Georgia

- Date: November 28
- Game time: 3:30 p.m.

Game information

First quarter
Second quarter
Third quarter
Fourth quarter

Statistics	GT	UGA
First downs		
Plays–yards		
Rushes–yards		
Passing yards		
Passing: comp–att–int		
Turnovers		
Time of possession		

Team	Category	Player	Statistics
Georgia Tech	Passing		
Georgia Tech	Rushing		
Georgia Tech	Receiving		
Georgia	Passing		
Georgia	Rushing		
Georgia	Receiving		

== Personnel ==
=== Roster ===
2026 Georgia Bulldogs football team roster
Players
Coaches
Offense

Pos.	#	Name	Class
WR	0	Sacovie White-Helton	Jr
WR	1	Talyn Taylor	So
WR	2	Thomas Blackshear	So
RB	3	Nate Frazier	Jr
WR	4	CJ Wiley	So
RB	5	Chauncey Bowens	Jr
WR	6	Isiah Canion	Jr
TE	7	Lawson Luckie	Sr
WR	8	Landon Roldan	So
TE	9	Ethan Barbour	So
TE	10	Elyiss Williams	So
WR	11	Jeremy Bell	Jr
QB	12	Ryan Puglisi	Jr
WR	13	Tyler J. Williams	So
QB	14	Gunner Stockton	5th
QB	15	Ryan Montgomery	So
WR	16	London Humphreys	Sr
QB	17	Colter Ginn	Jr
QB	18	Bryson Beaver	Fr
QB	19	Hezekiah Millender	So
RB	20	Dwight Phillips Jr.	Jr
RB	22	Dante Dowdell	Sr
TE	23	Jaden Reddell	Jr
RB	24	Bo Walker	So
QB	25	Jake Bobo	So
RB	26	Micah Bell	Sr
RB	27	Jae Lamar	Fr
WR	28	Walter Blanchard	Sr
RB	30	Nick Peal	Fr
RB	31	Wade Penn	Jr
WR	36	Jackson St. Clair	So
WR	37	Ben McElreath	So
TE	41	David Lalaian	Sr
WR	46	Danny Curran	5th
WR	47	Will Taylor	Sr
OL	50	Cortez Smith	So
OL	51	Malachi Toliver	Jr
OL	52	Michael Uini	Jr
OL	53	Zach Lewis	Fr
OL	54	Waltclaire Flynn Jr.	Jr
C	55	Zykie Helton	Fr
OL	60	Henry Peagler	Jr
OL	63	Dontrell Glover	So
OL	64	Jahzare Jackson	Jr
OL	65	Dennis Uzochukwu	So
OL	66	Tyreek Jemison	Fr
OL	69	Graham Houston	Fr
OL	70	Daniel Calhoun	Jr
OL	71	Earnest Greene III	5th
OL	72	Ekene Ogboko	Fr
OL	73	Juan Gaston	So
OL	74	Drew Bobo	5th
OL	75	Mason Short	So
OL	76	Marcus Harrison	Jr
OL	78	Tate Nelms	Jr
OL	79	TyQuez Richardson	Jr
TE	80	Kaiden Prothro	Fr
WR	81	Craig Dandridge	Fr
TE	82	Colton Heinrich	Jr
WR	83	Brody Tolbert	So
WR	84	Dallas Dickerson	Fr
WR	85	Ryan Mosley	Fr
WR	86	Tre Shields	Fr
TE	87	Lincoln Keyes	Fr
TE	88	Brayden Fogle	Fr

Defense

Pos.	#	Name	Class
OLB	0	Gabe Harris Jr.	Sr
DB	1	Ellis Robinson IV	Jr
S	2	Zion Branch	5th
OLB	3	Quintavius Johnson	Jr
DB	4	KJ Bolden	Jr
ILB	5	Raylen Wilson	Sr
DB	6	Justice Fitzpatrick	Fr
S	7	Khalil Barnes	Sr
DB	8	Demello Jones	Jr
ILB	9	Chris Cole	Jr
ILB	10	Zayden Walker	So
OLB	11	Darren Ikinnagbon	So
S	12	Ja'Marley Riddle	Jr
ILB	13	AJ Kruah	So
S	14	Rasean Dinkins	So
OLB	15	Khamari Brooks	Fr
CB	16	Maurice Hayes	Jr
OLB	17	Amaris Williams	Jr
DB	18	Caden Harris	Fr
ILB	19	Justin Williams	Jr
S	20	Zech Fort	Fr
S	22	Todd Robinson	So
S	23	Tyriq Green	Fr
DB	24	Braylon Conley	Jr
DB	25	Jontae Gilbert	So
DB	26	Gentry Williams	5th
S	27	Blake Stewart	Fr
DB	28	Jordan Smith	Fr
DE	29	Isaiah Gibson	So
ILB	30	Terrell Foster	5th
DB	31	Kyron Jones	Sr
DB	32	Jaylan Morgan	So
DL	33	PJ Dean	Fr
ILB	35	Elijah Littlejohn	Fr
S	36	Daniel Okonkwo	So
DL	38	AJ Lonon Jr.	Fr
DL	41	Carter Luckie	Fr
ILB	42	Nick Abrams II	Fr
DL	44	Jordan Hall	Sr
ILB	45	Terrence Penick Jr.	Fr
ILB	46	Eli Barrow	Sr
OLB	48	Duncan Carpenter	So
DL	52	Valdin Sone	Fr
DL	55	London Seymour	So
DL	56	Nasir Johnson	Jr
DL	67	Clinton Barlow	Sr
DT	81	Josh Horton	Sr
OLB	85	Chase Linton	So
DL	90	Elijah Griffin	So
DE	91	Justin Greene	Jr
DL	92	Preston Carey	Fr
DL	95	Nnamdi Ogboko	Jr
DL	96	JJ Hanne	So
DL	99	Joseph Jonah-Ajonye	Jr

Special teams

Pos.	#	Name	Class
LS	50	Colton Dermer	Fr
LS	51	Will Snellings	Sr
P	90	Drew Miller	Jr
K	91	Peyton Woodring	Sr
P	93	Carter Horton	Sr
K	94	Henry Bates	5th
P	97	Wade Register	Fr
K	98	Connor Ferguson	So
K	99	Harran Zureikat	Fr

Head coach

- Kirby Smart

Coordinators/assistant coaches

- Mike Bobo – Offensive coordinator/quarterbacks
- Glenn Schumann – Defensive coordinator/inside linebackers
- Travaris Robinson – Co-defensive coordinator/safeties
- Kirk Benedict – Special teams coordinator
- Josh Crawford – Running backs
- James Coley - Wide receivers
- Todd Hartley – Assistant head coach/tight ends
- Phil Rauscher – Offensive line
- Tray Scott – Defensive line
- Larry Knight – Outside linebackers
- Donte Williams – Associate head coach/defensive backs
- Andrew Thacker – Nickels/stars

Legend

- (C) Team captain
- (S) Suspended
- (I) Ineligible
- Injured
- Redshirt

Roster
Last update: 2026-09-01

=== Depth chart ===
- Depth chart is a projection and is subject to change.

Defense

NB
Khalil Barnes
Blake Stewart
Zech Fort

FS
Rasean Dinkins
Kyron Jones
Zion Branch

JACK	MAC	MONEY
Quintavius Johnson	Raylen Wilson	Chris Cole
Khamari Brooks	Justin Williams	Zayden Walker
PJ Dean	AJ Kruah	Terrell Foster

SS
KJ Bolden
Ja'Marley Riddle
Todd Robinson

CB
Demello Jones
Gentry Williams
Jontae Gilbert

DE	NT	DE
Gabe Harris Jr.	Jordan Hall	Elijah Griffin
Joseph Jonah-Ajonye	Nnamdi Ogboko	JJ Hanne
Carter Luckie	Valdin Sone	Josh Horton

CB
Ellis Robinson IV
Braylon Conley
Caden Harris

Offense

WR-X
London Humphreys
Talyn Taylor
Will Taylor

WR-Y
Sacovie White-Helton
Landon Roldan
Jeremy Bell

LT	LG	C	RG	RT
Earnest Greene III	Dontrell Glover	Drew Bobo	Zykie Helton	Juan Gaston
Jahzare Jackson	Michael Uini	Cortez Smith	Daniel Calhoun	Ekene Ogboko
Tyreek Jemison	Marcus Harrison	Henry Peagler	Malachi Toliver	TyQuez Richardson

TE
Lawson Luckie
Elyiss Williams
Ethan Barbour

WR-Z
Craig Dandridge
CJ Wiley
Ryan Mosley

QB
Gunner Stockton
Ryan Puglisi
Ryan Montgomery

Key reserves

Special teams
PK Peyton Woodring
P Drew Miller
KR Sacovie White-Helton
PR Sacovie White-Helton
LS Will Snellings
H Gunner Stockton

RB
Nate Frazier
Dwight Phillips Jr.
Bo Walker

=== Coaching staff ===
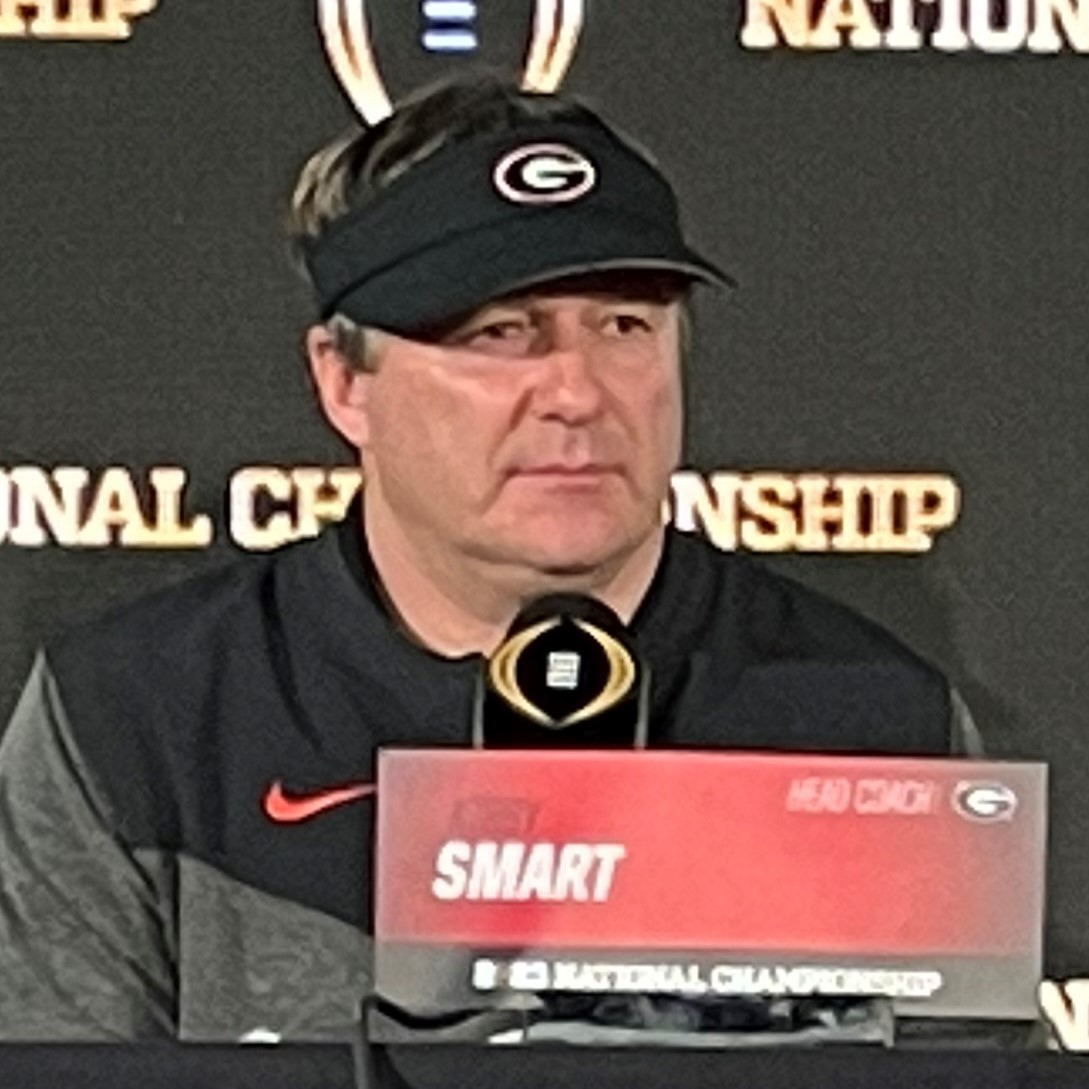
Kirby Smart in 2023

This is coach Kirby Smart's eleventh year at Georgia. He is under contract with Georgia through 2033, receiving $13 million annually.

Name	Position	Consecutive season at Georgia in current position
Kirby Smart	Head coach	11th
Mike Bobo	Offensive coordinator/Quarterbacks coach	4th
Glenn Schumann	Defensive coordinator/Inside linebackers coach	8th
Travaris Robinson	Co-Defensive coordinator/Safeties coach	3rd
Kirk Benedict	Special teams coordinator	3rd
Josh Crawford	Running backs coach	3rd
James Coley	Wide receivers coach	3rd
Todd Hartley	Tight ends coach	7th
Phil Rauscher	Offensive line coach	2nd
Tray Scott	Defensive line coach	9th
Larry Knight	Outside linebackers coach	1st
Donte Williams	Defensive backs coach	3rd
Andrew Thacker	Nickelbacks coach	2nd
Stacy Searels	Offensive analyst	5th
