= 2026 Tennessee State Tigers football team =

American college football season

2026 Tennessee State Tigers football
- Conference: Ohio Valley Conference
- Record: 4–8 (2–5 OVC)
- Head coach: Reggie Barlow (2nd season)
- Offensive coordinator: Matt Leone (1st season)
- Home stadium: Nissan Stadium

2026 Ohio Valley Conference football standings
	Conf.			Overall
Team	W		L	W		L
Western Illinois $^	6	–	1	8	–	4
UT Martin	5	–	2	6	–	6
Southeast Missouri State	5	–	2	7	–	5
Lindenwood	4	–	3	5	–	6
Eastern Illinois	3	–	4	4	–	8
Tennessee State	2	–	5	4	–	8
Gardner–Webb	2	–	5	3	–	9
Charleston Southern	1	–	6	4	–	8
$ – Conference champion; ^ – FCS playoff participant; As of November 22, 2026; Rankings from STATS Poll

The 2026 Tennessee State Tigers football team represents Tennessee State University as a member of the Ohio Valley Conference (OVC) during the 2026 NCAA Division I FCS football season. The Tigers are led by second-year head coach Reggie Barlow and play their home games at Nissan Stadium in Nashville, Tennessee.

== Schedule ==
Date	Time	Opponent	Site	TV	Result	Attendance
August 29	7:30 p.m.	Jackson State*	FirstBank Stadium; Nashville, TN (John Merritt Classic)	ESPN+	L 24–26	32,467
September 5	2:00 p.m.	at No. 3 (FBS) Georgia*	Sanford Stadium; Athens, GA	SECN+	L 3–63	93,033
September 12	6:00 p.m.	at Alabama A&M*	Louis Crews Stadium; Huntsville, AL	SWAC TV	L 3–30	13,749
September 19	6:00 p.m.	at Florida A&M*	Bragg Memorial Stadium; Tallahassee, FL	HBCU GO	W 29–26	12,399
October 3	3:00 p.m.	at Western Illinois	Hanson Field; Macomb, IL	ESPN+	L 21–28	2,563
October 10	2:30 p.m.	UT Martin	Nissan Stadium; Nashville, TN (Sgt. York Trophy)	ESPN+	L 28–42	670
October 17	5:30 p.m.	No. 24 Morgan State*	Nissan Stadium; Nashville, TN	ESPN+	W 25–16	11,347
October 24	2:30 p.m.	Charleston Southern	Nissan Stadium; Nashville, TN	ESPN+	L 7–20	1,401
October 31	1:00 p.m.	at Lindenwood	Harlen C. Hunter Stadium; St. Charles, MO	ESPN+	L 0–27	3,356
November 7	2:30 p.m.	Southeast Missouri State	Nissan Stadium; Nashville, TN	ESPN+	L 14–33	1,184
November 14	2:30 p.m.	Eastern Illinois	Nissan Stadium; Nashville, TN	ESPN+	W 13–12	1,244
November 21	12:30 p.m.	at Gardner–Webb	Ernest W. Spangler Stadium; Boiling Springs, NC	ESPN+	W 16–12	3,325
*Non-conference game; Rankings from STATS Poll released prior to the game; All times are in Central time

== Game summaries ==
=== Jackson State ===
Jackson State Tigers (0–0) at Tennessee State Tigers (0–0) – Game summary

Quarter	1	2	3	4	Total
Jackson State	7	3	13	3	26
Tennessee State	7	10	0	7	24

at FirstBank Stadium • Nashville, Tennessee

- Date: August 29
- Game time: 7:30 p.m.
- Game weather: Sunny • Temperature: 88 °F (31 °C) • Wind: SW 1 mph
- Game attendance: 32,467
- Referee: Matt Jones
- TV: ESPN+

Game information

First quarter

- JKST – Jabari Jones 88-yard pass from Jared Lockhart (Andrew Ivaniciuc kick), 7:46. Jackson State 7–0. Drive: 3 plays, 92 yards, 1:16.
- TNST – Brenton Paul 9-yard run (Preston Hurless kick), 2:04. Tied 7–7. Drive: 13 plays, 75 yards, 5:42.

Second quarter

- TNST – Daylin Lee 1-yard run (Preston Hurless kick), 6:49. Tennessee State 14–7. Drive: 10 plays, 80 yards, 4:49.
- TNST – Preston Hurless 45-yard field goal, 1:56. Tennessee State 17–7. Drive: 7 plays, 17 yards, 3:23.
- JKST – Andrew Ivaniciuc 38-yard field goal, 0:26. Tennessee State 17–10. Drive: 9 plays, 24 yards, 1:22.

Third quarter

- JKST – Andrew Ivaniciuc 45-yard field goal, 11:10. Tennessee State 17–13. Drive: 8 plays, 52 yards, 3:42.
- JKST – Emari Matthews 2-yard run (Andrew Ivaniciuc kick), 7:06. Jackson State 20–17. Drive: 10 plays, 60 yards, 3:44.
- JKST – Andrew Ivaniciuc 51-yard field goal, 1:13. Jackson State 23–17. Drive: 7 plays, 33 yards, 2:33.

Fourth quarter

- TNST – Francisco Pratts III 5-yard pass from Daylin Lee (Preston Hurless kick), 8:48. Tennessee State 24–23. Drive: 14 plays, 75 yards, 7:20.
- JKST – Andrew Ivaniciuc 21-yard field goal, 2:31. Jackson State 26–24. Drive: 15 plays, 77 yards, 6:13.

Statistics	JKST	TNST
First downs	22	22
Plays–yards	64–402	74–354
Rushes–yards	38–180	33–89
Passing yards	222	265
Passing: comp–att–int	17–26–0	23–41–0
Turnovers	0	0
Time of possession	26:59	33:01

Team	Category	Player	Statistics
Jackson State	Passing	Jared Lockhart	17/26, 222 yards, TD
Jackson State	Rushing	Nate Blount IV	15 carries, 101 yards
Jackson State	Receiving	Jabari Jones	4 receptions, 117 yards, TD
Tennessee State	Passing	Daylin Lee	23/41, 265 yards, TD
Tennessee State	Rushing	Daylin Lee	13 carries, 40 yards, TD
Tennessee State	Receiving	Jayden Guy	9 receptions, 148 yards

=== at No. 3 (FBS) Georgia ===
The Tigers played the Georgia Bulldogs for the first time in program history. Georgia paid Tennessee State $600,000 to play the game. Georgia won decisively 63–3.

Georgia received the opening kickoff and scored on its first drive when Nate Frazier ran 48 yards for a touchdown, the first of the season. Tennessee State went three-and-out on its opening possession before Frazier scored his second touchdown on a 14-yard run, giving Georgia a 14–0 lead. After another Tennessee State punt, Gunner Stockton threw a three-yard touchdown pass to Elyiss Williams to extend the lead to 21–0. On Georgia's next possession, Stockton connected with Talyn Taylor for an 11-yard touchdown, giving the Bulldogs a 28–0 lead at the end of the first quarter. Stockton opened the second quarter with a 14-yard touchdown pass to Jaden Reddell, his third touchdown pass of the game. After another Tiger punt, Tennessee State stopped Georgia's offense for the first time by forcing a turnover on downs. From there, the Tigers steadily moved the ball against the Georgia defense and scored their first points of the afternoon, on a 37-yard field goal by Preston Hurless. Georgia entered halftime leading 35–3.

The Tigers received the opening kickoff of the second half but were forced to punt after a three-play drive. Georgia responded with Frazier's third rushing touchdown of the game, a three-yard run that extended the lead to 42–3. On the Bulldogs' next possession, backup quarterback Ryan Puglisi threw a 16-yard touchdown pass to Kaiden Prothro, giving Georgia a 49–3 lead entering the fourth quarter. Georgia scored two more touchdowns in the fourth quarter, including a 54-yard touchdown pass from Ryan Montgomery to Jeremy Bell and an 11-yard touchdown run by Jae Lamar, to finish with a 63–3 victory.

Tennessee State Tigers (0–1) at No. 3 (FBS) Georgia Bulldogs (0–0) – Game summary

Quarter	1	2	3	4	Total
Tigers	0	3	0	0	3
No. 3 (FBS) Bulldogs	28	7	14	14	63

at Sanford Stadium • Athens, Georgia

- Date: September 5
- Game time: 2:00 p.m.
- Game weather: Sunny • Temperature: 101 °F (38 °C) • Wind: SE 2 mph (3.2 km/h)
- Game attendance: 93,033
- Referee: Adam Savoie
- TV announcers (SECN+): Clay Matvick, Rocky Boiman and Laura Stickells
- Report: Official report

Game information

First quarter

- (13:36) UGA – Nate Frazier 48-yard run, Peyton Woodring kick (Drive: 3 plays, 59 yards, 1:20; Georgia 7–0)
- (10:08) UGA – Nate Frazier 14-yard run, Peyton Woodring kick (Drive: 5 plays, 54 yards, 2:07; Georgia 14–0)
- (6:30) UGA – Elyiss Williams 17-yard pass from Gunner Stockton, Peyton Woodring kick (Drive: 3 plays, 63 yards, 1:31; Georgia 21–0)
- (2:08) UGA – Talyn Taylor 11-yard pass from Gunner Stockton, Peyton Woodring kick (Drive: 6 plays, 52 yards, 3:20; Georgia 28–0)

Second quarter

- (10:36) UGA – Jaden Reddell 14-yard pass from Gunner Stockton, Peyton Woodring kick (Drive: 7 plays, 82 yards, 4:15; Georgia 35–0)
- (2:08) TNST – Preston Hurless 37-yard field goal (Drive: 14 plays, 55 yards, 5:29; Georgia 35–3)

Third quarter

- (10:56) UGA – Nate Frazier 3-yard run, Peyton Woodring kick (Drive: 6 plays, 65 yards, 2:45; Georgia 42–3)
- (5:01) UGA – Kaiden Prothro 16-yard pass from Ryan Puglisi, Peyton Woodring kick (Drive: 9 plays, 85 yards, 3:39; Georgia 49–3)

Fourth quarter

- (13:38) UGA – Jeremy Bell 54-yard pass from Ryan Montgomery, Harran Zureikat kick (Drive: 4 plays, 71 yards, 2:12; Georgia 56–3)
- (8:57) UGA – Jae Lamar 11-yard run, Harran Zureikat kick (Drive: 7 plays, 59 yards, 3:47; Georgia 63–3)

Statistics	TNST	UGA
First downs	10	31
Plays–yards	58–109	60–660
Rushes–yards	32–10	27–272
Passing yards	99	388
Passing: comp–att–int	15–26–0	25–33–0
Turnovers	0	0
Time of possession	31:33	28:27

Team	Category	Player	Statistics
Tennessee State	Passing	Daylin Lee	11/19, 62 yards
Tennessee State	Rushing	Trevor Pearson	5 carries, 14 yards
Tennessee State	Receiving	Cam Bulluck	4 receptions, 28 yards
Georgia	Passing	Gunner Stockton	15/16, 202 yards, 3 TD
Georgia	Rushing	Nate Frazier	4 carries, 72 yards, 3 TD
Georgia	Receiving	Jeremy Bell	1 reception, 54 yards, TD

=== at Alabama A&M ===
Tennessee State Tigers (0–2) at Alabama A&M Bulldogs (1–1) – Game summary

Quarter	1	2	3	4	Total
Tigers	0	3	0	0	3
Bulldogs	14	6	0	10	30

at Louis Crews Stadium • Normal, Alabama

- Date: September 12
- Game time: 6:00 p.m.
- Game weather: Sunny
- Game attendance: 13,749
- Referee: Ivan Daniels
- TV announcers (SWAC TV): Mo Carter (play-by-play), Tolly Carr (analyst) and Thai Floyd (sideline)

Game information

First quarter

- AAMU - Jarel Williams 61-yard pass from Cornelious Brown IV (David Faulk kick), 8:36. Bulldogs 7–0. Drive: 1 play, 61 yards, 0:08.
- AAMU - Donovan Price 30-yard pass form Cornelious Brown IV (David Faulk kick), 3:17. Bulldogs 14–0. Drive: 7 plays, 80 yards, 3:32.

Second quarter

- TNST - Preston Hurless 37-yard field goal, 13:34. Bulldogs 14–3. Drive: 8 plays, 58 yards, 2:42.
- AAMU - David Faulk 35-yard field goal, 8:35. Bulldogs 17–3. Drive: 8 plays, 61 yards, 4:53.
- AAMU - David Faulk 28-yard field goal, 0:09. Bulldogs 20–3. Drive: 13 plays, 59 yards, 2:06.

Third quarter

- No scoring plays.

Fourth quarter

- AAMU - Jaylen Bean 11-yard pass form Cornelious Brown IV (David Faulk kick), 14:30. Bulldogs 27–3. Drive: 7 plays, 77 yards, 3:27.
- AAMU - David Faulk 22-yard field goal, 5:19. Bulldogs 30–3. Drive: 7 plays, 26 yards, 4:19.

Statistics	TNST	AAMU
First downs	17	20
Plays–yards	71–251	67–452
Rushes–yards	30–64	29–126
Passing yards	187	326
Passing: comp–att–int	19–41–2	24–38–1
Turnovers	3	1
Time of possession	28:39	31:21

Team	Category	Player	Statistics
Tennessee State	Passing	Daylin Lee	19/41, 187 yards, 2 INT
Tennessee State	Rushing	Brenton Paul	12 carries, 40 yards
Tennessee State	Receiving	Cam Bulluck	4 receptions 50 yards
Alabama A&M	Passing	Cornelious Brown IV	24/38, 326 yards, 3 TD, INT
Alabama A&M	Rushing	Kolton Nero	10 carries, 52 yards
Alabama A&M	Receiving	Jarel Williams	8 receptions, 175 yards, TD

=== at Florida A&M ===
Tennessee State Tigers (0–3) at Florida A&M Rattlers (1–2) – Game summary

Quarter	1	2	3	4	Total
Tigers	0	0	0	0	0
Rattlers	0	0	0	0	0

at Bragg Memorial Stadium • Tallahassee, Florida

- Date: September 19
- Game time: 6:00 p.m.

Game information

First quarter
Second quarter
Third quarter
Fourth quarter

Statistics	TNST	FAMU
First downs		
Plays–yards		
Rushes–yards		
Passing yards		
Passing: comp–att–int		
Turnovers		
Time of possession		

Team	Category	Player	Statistics
Tennessee State	Passing		
Tennessee State	Rushing		
Tennessee State	Receiving		
Florida A&M	Passing		
Florida A&M	Rushing		
Florida A&M	Receiving		

=== at Western Illinois ===
Tennessee State Tigers (1–3) at Western Illinois Leathernecks (2–3) – Game summary

Quarter	1	2	3	4	Total
Tigers	0	0	0	0	0
Leathernecks	0	0	0	0	0

at Hanson Field • Macomb, Illinois

- Date: October 3
- Game time: 3:00 p.m.
- TV: ESPN+

Game information

First quarter
Second quarter
Third quarter
Fourth quarter

Statistics	TNST	WIU
First downs		
Plays–yards		
Rushes–yards		
Passing yards		
Passing: comp–att–int		
Turnovers		
Time of possession		

Team	Category	Player	Statistics
Tennessee State	Passing		
Tennessee State	Rushing		
Tennessee State	Receiving		
Western Illinois	Passing		
Western Illinois	Rushing		
Western Illinois	Receiving		

=== UT Martin (Sgt. York Trophy) ===
UT Martin Skyhawks (1–4) at Tennessee State Tigers (1–4) – Game summary

Quarter	1	2	3	4	Total
Skyhawks	0	0	0	0	0
Tigers	0	0	0	0	0

at Nissan Stadium • Nashville, Tennessee

- Date: October 10
- Game time: 2:30 p.m.

Game information

First quarter
Second quarter
Third quarter
Fourth quarter

Statistics	UTM	TNST
First downs		
Plays–yards		
Rushes–yards		
Passing yards		
Passing: comp–att–int		
Turnovers		
Time of possession		

Team	Category	Player	Statistics
UT Martin	Passing		
UT Martin	Rushing		
UT Martin	Receiving		
Tennessee State	Passing		
Tennessee State	Rushing		
Tennessee State	Receiving		

=== No. 24 Morgan State ===
No. 24 Morgan State Bears (5–1) at Tennessee State Tigers (1–5) – Game summary

Quarter	1	2	3	4	Total
No. 24 Bears	0	0	0	0	0
Tigers	0	0	0	0	0

at Nissan Stadium • Nashville, Tennessee

- Date: October 17
- Game time: 5:30 p.m.

Game information

First quarter
Second quarter
Third quarter
Fourth quarter

Statistics	MORG	TNST
First downs		
Plays–yards		
Rushes–yards		
Passing yards		
Passing: comp–att–int		
Turnovers		
Time of possession		

Team	Category	Player	Statistics
Morgan State	Passing		
Morgan State	Rushing		
Morgan State	Receiving		
Tennessee State	Passing		
Tennessee State	Rushing		
Tennessee State	Receiving		

=== Charleston Southern ===
Charleston Southern Buccaneers (3–4) at Tennessee State Tigers (2–5) – Game summary

Quarter	1	2	3	4	Total
Buccaneers	0	0	0	0	0
Tigers	0	0	0	0	0

at Nissan Stadium • Nashville, Tennessee

- Date: October 24
- Game time: 2:30 p.m.

Game information

First quarter
Second quarter
Third quarter
Fourth quarter

Statistics	CHSO	TNST
First downs		
Plays–yards		
Rushes–yards		
Passing yards		
Passing: comp–att–int		
Turnovers		
Time of possession		

Team	Category	Player	Statistics
Charleston Southern	Passing		
Charleston Southern	Rushing		
Charleston Southern	Receiving		
Tennessee State	Passing		
Tennessee State	Rushing		
Tennessee State	Receiving		

=== at Lindenwood ===
Tennessee State Tigers (2–6) at Lindenwood Lions (3–4) – Game summary

Quarter	1	2	3	4	Total
Tigers	0	0	0	0	0
Lions	0	0	0	0	0

at Harlen C. Hunter Stadium • St. Charles, Missouri

- Date: October 31
- Game time: 1:00 p.m.

Game information

First quarter
Second quarter
Third quarter
Fourth quarter

Statistics	TNST	LIN
First downs		
Plays–yards		
Rushes–yards		
Passing yards		
Passing: comp–att–int		
Turnovers		
Time of possession		

Team	Category	Player	Statistics
Tennessee State	Passing		
Tennessee State	Rushing		
Tennessee State	Receiving		
Lindenwood	Passing		
Lindenwood	Rushing		
Lindenwood	Receiving		

=== Southeast Missouri State ===
Southeast Missouri State Redhawks (5–4) at Tennessee State Tigers (2–7) – Game summary

Quarter	1	2	3	4	Total
Redhawks	0	0	0	0	0
Tigers	0	0	0	0	0

at Nissan Stadium • Nashville, Tennessee

- Date: November 7
- Game time: 2:30 p.m.

Game information

First quarter
Second quarter
Third quarter
Fourth quarter

Statistics	SEMO	TNST
First downs		
Plays–yards		
Rushes–yards		
Passing yards		
Passing: comp–att–int		
Turnovers		
Time of possession		

Team	Category	Player	Statistics
Southeast Missouri State	Passing		
Southeast Missouri State	Rushing		
Southeast Missouri State	Receiving		
Tennessee State	Passing		
Tennessee State	Rushing		
Tennessee State	Receiving		

=== Eastern Illinois ===
Eastern Illinois Panthers (3–7) at Tennessee State Tigers (2–8) – Game summary

Quarter	1	2	3	4	Total
Panthers	0	0	0	0	0
Tigers	0	0	0	0	0

at Nissan Stadium • Nashville, Tennessee

- Date: November 14
- Game time: 2:30 p.m.

Game information

First quarter
Second quarter
Third quarter
Fourth quarter

Statistics	EIU	TNST
First downs		
Plays–yards		
Rushes–yards		
Passing yards		
Passing: comp–att–int		
Turnovers		
Time of possession		

Team	Category	Player	Statistics
Eastern Illinois	Passing		
Eastern Illinois	Rushing		
Eastern Illinois	Receiving		
Tennessee State	Passing		
Tennessee State	Rushing		
Tennessee State	Receiving		

=== at Gardner–Webb ===
Tennessee State Tigers (3–8) at Gardner–Webb Runnin' Bulldogs (3–8) – Game summary

Quarter	1	2	3	4	Total
Tigers	0	0	0	0	0
Runnin' Bulldogs	0	0	0	0	0

at Ernest W. Spangler Stadium • Boiling Springs, North Carolina

- Date: November 21
- Game time: 12:30 p.m.

Game information

First quarter
Second quarter
Third quarter
Fourth quarter

Statistics	TNST	GWEB
First downs		
Plays–yards		
Rushes–yards		
Passing yards		
Passing: comp–att–int		
Turnovers		
Time of possession		

Team	Category	Player	Statistics
Tennessee State	Passing		
Tennessee State	Rushing		
Tennessee State	Receiving		
Gardner–Webb	Passing		
Gardner–Webb	Rushing		
Gardner–Webb	Receiving		
