= 2026 SEC Championship Game =

- Conference Championship
Georgia Bulldogs
Head coach: Kirby Smart
- Date: December 5, 2026
- Season: 2026
- Stadium: Mercedes-Benz Stadium
- Location: Atlanta, Georgia

United States TV coverage
- Network: ABC (ESPN+); Westwood One; SEC Radio
- Announcers: ABC: Chris Fowler (play-by-play), Kirk Herbstreit (analyst), Holly Rowe and Laura Rutledge (sidelines)

2026 Southeastern Conference football standings
	Conf.			Overall
Team	W		L	W		L
No. 1 Georgia y	8	–	1	10	–	1
No. 5 Texas	6	–	2	9	–	2
No. 9 Tennessee	6	–	2	9	–	2
No. 3 Alabama	6	–	2	9	–	2
No. 22 Oklahoma	5	–	3	7	–	4
No. 24 Florida	5	–	4	7	–	4
No. 16 Kentucky	5	–	4	7	–	4
No. 25 Ole Miss	4	–	4	7	–	4
Auburn	4	–	4	7	–	4
Missouri	4	–	4	7	–	4
No. 21 South Carolina	4	–	5	6	–	5
LSU	3	–	5	6	–	5
Mississippi State	2	–	6	5	–	6
Arkansas	2	–	6	4	–	7
Texas A&M	1	–	7	4	–	7
Vanderbilt	1	–	7	4	–	7
Championship: Georgia vs TBD
^ – College Football Playoff participant; $ – Conference champion; y – Championship game participant; As of November 22, 2026; Rankings from CFP rankings

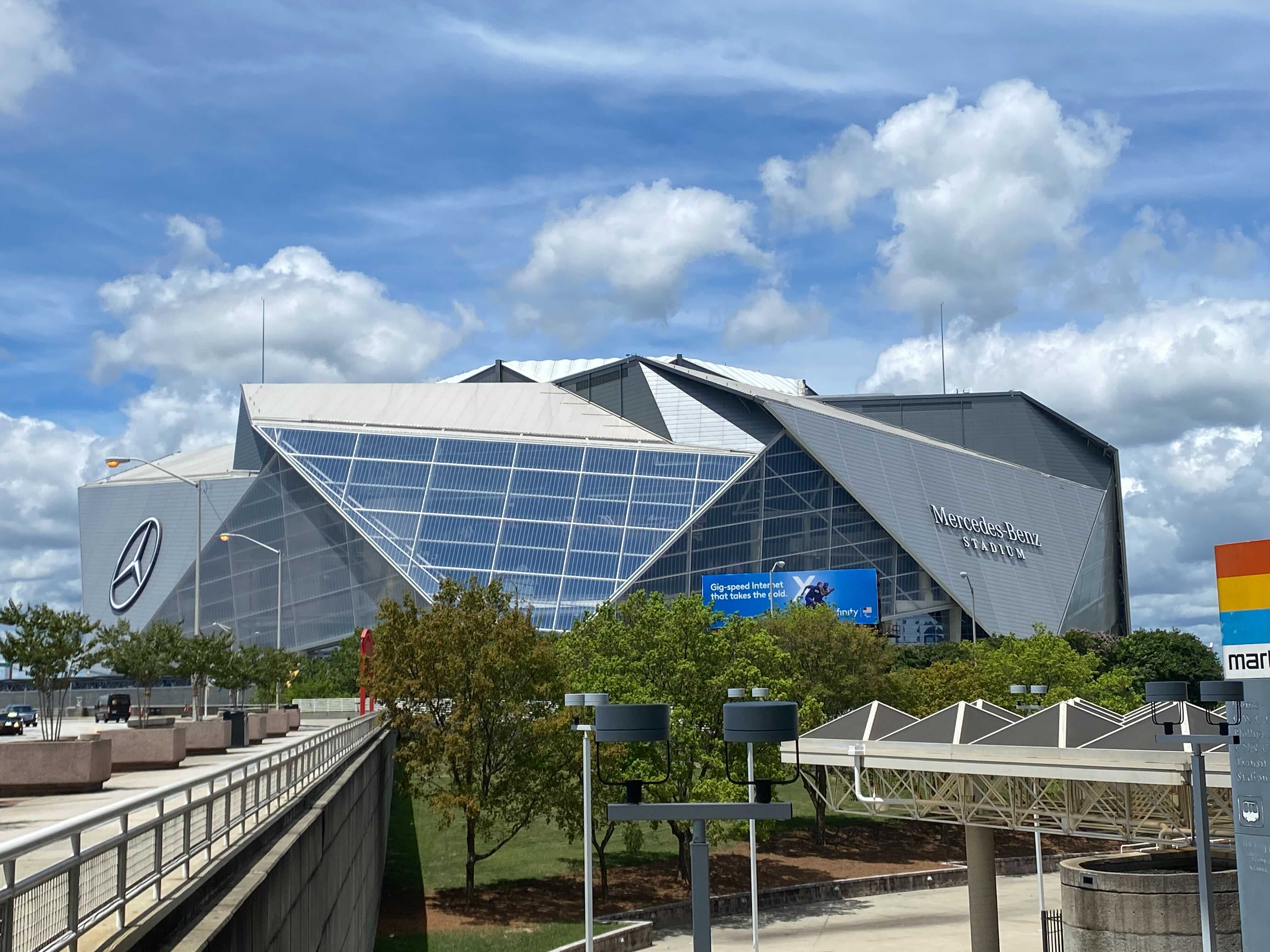
Mercedes-Benz Stadium in Atlanta, Georgia, the site of the SEC Championship Game.

The 2026 SEC Championship game is an upcoming college football game that is scheduled to be played on December 5, 2026, at Mercedes-Benz Stadium in Atlanta, Georgia. The game will feature the Georgia Bulldogs and another team to be determined. The game will begin at 4:00 p.m. EST and will be broadcast on ABC for the third consecutive year.

Following the expansion of the College Football Playoff to 24 teams, it will be the 35th and final SEC Championship Game.

== Teams ==
=== Georgia Bulldogs ===
Georgia entered the season ranked No. 3 in both the AP and Coaches polls. The Bulldogs opened the season with two non-conference games, defeating Tennessee State 63–3 and Western Kentucky 70–20. Following the win over Tennessee State, Georgia rose to No. 2 in the AP Poll. In their SEC opener, the Bulldogs defeated Arkansas 45–17 on the road, then beat Oklahoma 41–13 in their first meeting as conference opponents and Vanderbilt 38–14. Georgia remained ranked No. 2 through Week 5. The Bulldogs' game against No. 6 Alabama was their first against a ranked opponent, and Georgia won 20–17, rising to No. 1 the next day. Georgia's undefeated season came to an end the following week with a 27–24 loss to Auburn in the Deep South's Oldest Rivalry, marking the Bulldogs' first defeat to the Tigers since 2017.

Following a bye week, Georgia bounced back with a 27–8 victory over No. 17 Florida in Atlanta. The Bulldogs then traveled to Oxford and routed No. 10 Ole Miss 42–7 before returning home to defeat No. 22 Missouri 48–21.

The Bulldogs clinched a spot in the game following their 34–6 victory over rival South Carolina on November 21. It will be their sixth consecutive SEC Championship Game appearance and their 14th overall.

== Scoring summary ==
2026 SEC Championship Game

Quarter	1	2	3	4	Total
Georgia	0	0	0	0	0
TBD	0	0	0	0	0

at Mercedes-Benz Stadium • Atlanta, Georgia

- Date: December 5, 2026
- Game time: 4:00 p.m.
- TV announcers (ABC): Chris Fowler (play-by-play), Kirk Herbstreit (analyst), Holly Rowe and Laura Rutledge (sideline)

=== Statistics ===
Statistics	UGA
First downs	
Plays–yards	
Rushes–yards	
Passing yards	
Passing: comp–att–int	
Turnovers	
Time of possession	

Team	Category	Player	Statistics
Georgia	Passing		
Georgia	Rushing		
Georgia	Receiving		
	Passing		
	Rushing		
	Receiving		
