= Dwight Phillips Jr. =

American football player (born 2005)

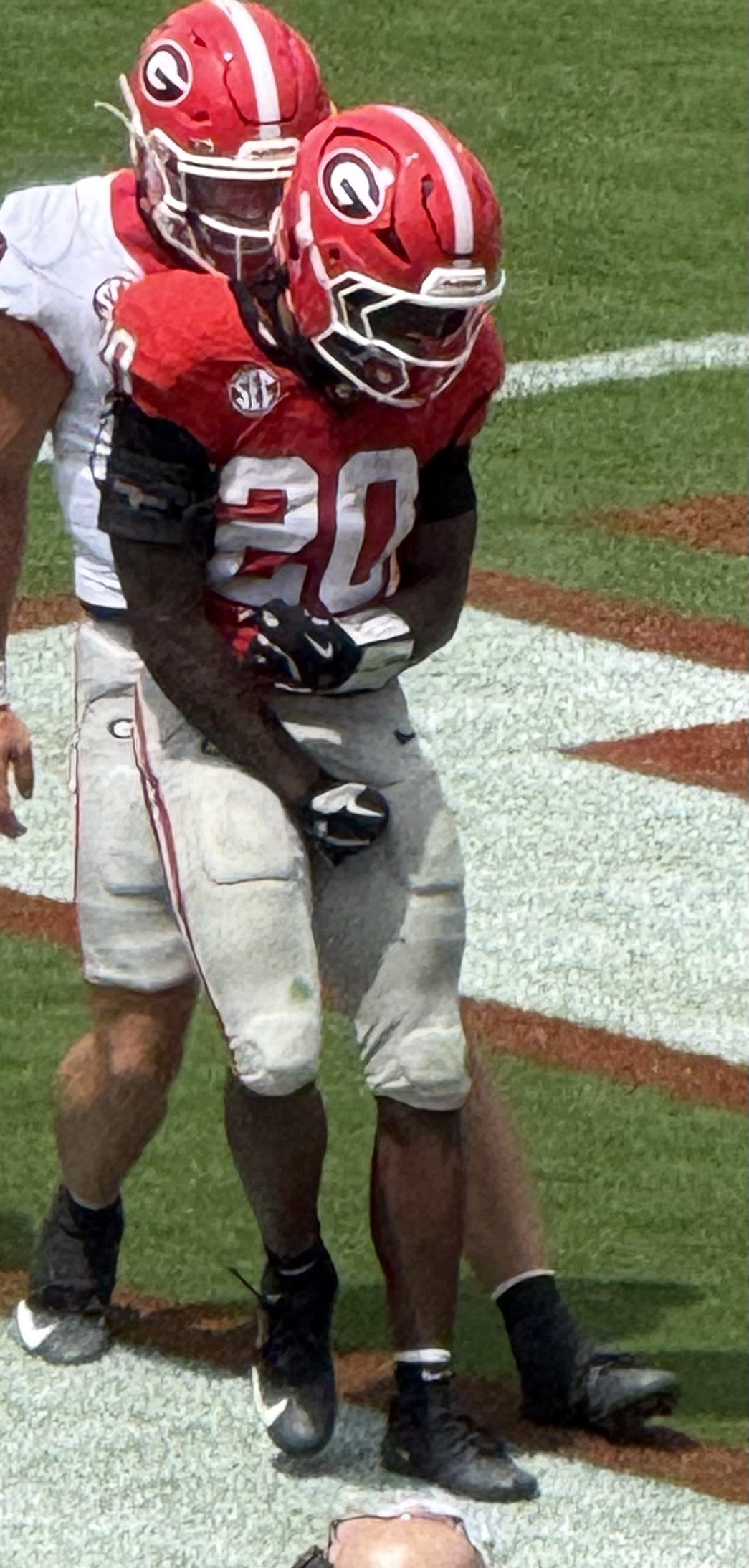
- Phillips in 2026

No. 20 – Georgia Bulldogs
- Position: Running back
- Class: Junior

Personal information
- Born: December 29, 2005 (age 20)
- Listed height: 5 ft 10 in (1.78 m)
- Listed weight: 185 lb (84 kg)

Career information
- High school: Pebblebrook (Mableton, Georgia)
- College: Georgia (2024–present)
- Stats at ESPN

Dwight "Peanut" Phillips Jr. (born December 29, 2005) is an American college football running back for the Georgia Bulldogs of the Southeastern Conference (SEC).

== Early life ==
Phillips attended Pebblebrook High School in Mableton, Georgia. In addition to playing football, he was a state champion in track and field. A four-star recruit, he committed to play college football at the University of Georgia.

== College career ==
Phillips played sparingly in 2024, recording six carries for 33 yards and a touchdown, which came on a four-yard run against Florida. In the 2025 season opener against Marshall, he rushed for 60 yards and a touchdown in a 45–7 rout. Phillips finished the season with 210 rushing yards on 35 carries. Against Oklahoma the following season, he scored on a 54-yard run in a 41–13 win. In his first career start, on the road against No. 6 Alabama, Phillips rushed for a career-high 120 yards on 17 carries.

=== Statistics ===
College statistics
Season	Team	Games	Rushing				Receiving			
Season	Team	GP	Att	Yards	Avg	TD	Rec	Yards	Avg	TD
2024	Georgia	6	6	33	5.5	1	2	24	12.0	0
2025	Georgia	12	35	210	6.0	1	1	-6	-6.0	0
2026	Georgia	10	73	547	7.5	2	13	129	9.9	1
Career		28	114	790	6.9	4	16	147	9.2	1

== Personal life ==
Phillips is nicknamed "Peanut." He has said that the nickname was given to him by Will Muschamp and that he does not know its meaning. Phillips is the son of Olympic gold medalist Dwight Phillips.
