= Sacovie White-Helton =

American football player (born 2005)

No. 0 – Georgia Bulldogs
- Position: Wide receiver
- Class: Junior

Personal information
- Born: August 11, 2005 (age 21)
- Listed height: 5 ft 9 in (1.75 m)
- Listed weight: 180 lb (82 kg)

Career information
- High school: Cass (White, Georgia)
- College: Georgia (2024–present)
- Stats at ESPN

Sacovie Jahmal Omario White-Helton (né White; born August 11, 2005) is an American college football wide receiver for the Georgia Bulldogs of the Southeastern Conference (SEC).

== Early life ==
White-Helton attended Cass High School in White, Georgia. As a senior, he recorded 91 receptions for 1,409 yards and 15 touchdowns. He committed the University of Georgia to play college football.

== College career ==
As a freshman in 2024, White-Helton totaled four receptions for 38 yards. He recorded eight receptions for 70 yards in 2025. Entering the 2026 season, White-Helton was named a starter on offense. He scored his first career touchdown against Western Kentucky on a 70-yard reception.

| Season | Team | GP | Receiving | | | |
| Season | Team | GP | Rec | Yds | Avg | TD |
|---|---|---|---|---|---|---|
| 2024 | Georgia | 3 | 4 | 38 | 9.5 | 0 |
| 2025 | Georgia | 14 | 8 | 70 | 8.8 | 0 |
| 2026 | Georgia | 3 | 8 | 131 | 16.4 | 1 |
| Career | | 20 | 20 | 239 | 12.0 | 1 |
