= Bo Walker =

American football player

No. 24 – Georgia Bulldogs
- Position: Running back
- Class: Sophomore

Personal information
- Listed height: 5 ft 9 in (1.75 m)
- Listed weight: 210 lb (95 kg)

Career information
- High school: Rabun Gap-Nacoochee School (Rabun Gap, Georgia)
- College: Georgia (2025–present)
- Stats at ESPN

Bo Walker is an American college football running back for the Georgia Bulldogs of the Southeastern Conference (SEC).

== Early life ==
Walker attended Rabun Gap-Nacoochee School in Rabun Gap, Georgia. As a junior at Cedar Grove High School, he rushed for 1,579 yards and 29 touchdowns, helping lead his team to a state championship. Following his junior year, Walker transferred to Stockbridge High School but was ruled ineligible for his senior season. As a result, he transferred to play his final year of high school football at Rabun Gap. Walker finished his senior year with 681 total yards and three touchdowns. He committed to playing college football at the University of Georgia.

== College career ==
Walker was expected to play a significant role in Georgia's offense as true freshman entering the season. Against Charlotte, he rushed for 48 yards and three touchdowns.

=== Statistics ===
College statistics
Season	Team	Games	Rushing				Receiving			
Season	Team	GP	Att	Yards	Avg	TD	Rec	Yards	Avg	TD
2025	Georgia	7	22	100	4.5	3	2	2	1.0	0
2026	Georgia	8	38	230	6.1	1	4	5	1.3	0
Career		15	60	330	5.5	4	6	7	1.2	0
