= Isiah Canion =

American football player (born 2006)

No. 6 – Georgia Bulldogs
- Position: Wide receiver
- Class: Junior

Personal information
- Born: February 19, 2006 (age 20)
- Listed height: 6 ft 4 in (1.93 m)
- Listed weight: 205 lb (93 kg)

Career information
- High school: Warner Robins (Warner Robins, Georgia)
- College: Georgia Tech (2024–2025); Georgia (2026–present)
- Stats at ESPN

Isiah Canion (born February 19, 2006) is an American college football wide receiver for the Georgia Bulldogs. He previously played for the Georgia Tech Yellow Jackets.

== Early life ==
Canion attended Warner Robins High School in Warner Robins, Georgia, where he was a four-year letterman in football and three-year letterman in baseball. As a junior, Canion played on all three phases, as a wide receiver, quarterback, defensive back and long snapper. He recorded 584 passing yards, 395 receiving yards, 32 rushing yards and 12 total touchdowns to go with six tackles and two interceptions. As a senior in 2023, he notched 90 receptions for 1,450 yards and 16 touchdowns.

Canion was rated as a four-star recruit by 247Sports, and committed to play college football at the University of Notre Dame on April 27, 2023. He de-committed from Notre Dame on July 1. Two days later, Canion committed to Georgia Tech.

== College career ==
Canion played in ten games his freshman year, missing the first three after recovering from an injury he sustained in high school, recording his first catch on October 5, 2024, against Duke. He finished the season with six catches for 83 yards. The following year, Canion started all 12 games recording 33 receptions for 480 yards and four touchdowns. On January 3, 2026, he entered the transfer portal.

On January 8, 2026, Canion announced his decision to transfer to the University of Georgia to play for the Georgia Bulldogs. On September 19, Canion sustained an injury to his right leg during the first quarter of Georgia's game against Arkansas, which removed him from the game as well as the next five contests. Canion returned to play against Ole Miss, however he did not record a catch. The following week against Missouri, he totaled four receptions for 63 yards and a touchdown, his first as a Bulldog.

== Statistics ==
=== College statistics ===
Year	Team	Games		Receiving			
Year	Team	GP	GS	Rec	Yds	Avg	TD
2024	Georgia Tech	10	0	6	83	13.8	0
2025	Georgia Tech	12	12	33	480	14.5	4
2026	Georgia	5	5	7	91	13.0	1
Career		27	17	46	654	14.2	5
