= Amaris Williams =

American football player (born 2005)

No. 17 – Georgia Bulldogs
- Position: Linebacker
- Class: Junior

Personal information
- Born: August 13, 2005 (age 21)
- Listed height: 6 ft 3 in (1.91 m)
- Listed weight: 255 lb (116 kg)

Career information
- High school: Clinton (Clinton, North Carolina)
- College: Auburn (2024–2025); Georgia (2026–present)
- Stats at ESPN

Amaris Williams (born August 13, 2005) is an American college football linebacker for the Georgia Bulldogs of the Southeastern Conference (SEC). He previously played for the Auburn Tigers.

== Early life ==
Williams attended Overhills High School in Spring Lake, North Carolina for two years before transferring to Clinton High School in Clinton, North Carolina prior to his junior year. He played defensive end and running back in high school and as a senior had 34 tackles with 11 sacks on defense and 679 rushing yards with 12 touchdowns on offense. For his career he had 141 tackles, 35.5 sacks, 977 rushing yards and 17 touchdowns. Rated as a five-star recruit by 247Sports, Williams was selected to play in the 2024 All-American Bowl. He originally committed to play college football at the University of Florida before flipping his commitment to Auburn University.

== College career ==
As a true freshman at Auburn in 2024, Williams played in 10 games and had six tackles and 0.5 sacks. After the season, he entered the transfer portal but ultimately decided to return to Auburn. As a sophomore in 2025, he recorded 16 tackles and two sacks over 11 games. After the season, Williams again entered the transfer portal.

On January 8, 2026, Williams announced his decision to transfer to the University of Georgia to play for the Georgia Bulldogs.
