= Craig Dandridge =

American football player (born 2007)

No. 81 – Georgia Bulldogs
- Position: Wide receiver
- Class: Freshman

Personal information
- Born: June 26, 2007 (age 19)
- Listed height: 6 ft 1 in (1.85 m)
- Listed weight: 185 lb (84 kg)

Career information
- High school: Cambridge (Milton, Georgia)
- College: Georgia (2026–present)
- Stats at ESPN

Craig Donnell Dandridge Jr. (born June 26, 2007) is an American college football wide receiver for the Georgia Bulldogs.

== Early life ==
Dandridge attended Cambridge High School in Milton, Georgia. As a junior, he had 58 receptions for 1,443 yards with 14 touchdowns and as a senior had 62 receptions, 1,193 yards and 18 touchdowns. He was named to the Atlanta Journal-Constitution Super 11 his senior year. One of the top receiver recruits in his class, Dandridge committed to the University of Georgia to play college football.

== College career ==
Dandridge earned immediate playing time his freshman year at Georgia in 2026. In his first career game he had two receptions for 36 yards. He scored his first career touchdown during the teams third game against Arkansas, finishing with three receptions for 74 yards and the touchdown.
