= Jaden Reddell =

American football player

No. 23 – Georgia Bulldogs
- Position: Tight end
- Class: Junior

Personal information
- Listed height: 6 ft 4 in (1.93 m)
- Listed weight: 240 lb (109 kg)

Career information
- High school: Raymore-Peculiar (Peculiar, Missouri)
- College: Georgia (2024–present)
- Stats at ESPN

Jaden Tyler Lee Reddell is an American college football tight end for the Georgia Bulldogs of the Southeastern Conference (SEC).

== Early life ==
Reddell attended Raymore-Peculiar High School in Peculiar, Missouri. He committed the University of Georgia to play college football.

== College career ==
Reddell appeared in four games his first year at Georgia in 2024 and had two receptions for 18 yards. He played in all 14 games in 2025 mostly as a blocking tight end and had one reception for nine yards. Reddell returned to Georgia in 2026. In the first game of the season he had two receptions for 38 yards and scored his first career touchdown.

=== Statistics ===
Season	Team	GP	Receiving			
Season	Team	GP	Rec	Yds	Avg	TD
2024	Georgia	4	2	18	9.0	0
2025	Georgia	14	1	9	9.0	0
2026	Georgia	1	2	38	19.0	1
Career		19	5	65	13.0	1
