= Dontrell Glover =

American football player

No. 63 – Georgia Bulldogs
- Position: Guard
- Class: Sophomore

Personal information
- Listed height: 6 ft 3 in (1.91 m)
- Listed weight: 320 lb (145 kg)

Career information
- High school: Langston Hughes (South Fulton, Georgia)
- College: Georgia (2025–present)
- Stats at ESPN

Dontrell Glover is an American college football guard for the Georgia Bulldogs of the Southeastern Conference (SEC).

== Early life ==
Glover is from Fairburn, Georgia. He attended Langston Hughes High School in South Fulton where he played football as an offensive lineman, helping the team to a perfect record of 15–0 and a state title as a sophomore in 2022 while being selected a MaxPreps All-American. He was named to the Class 6A all-state team in each of his last three years and made thee state playoffs in all four of his seasons at Langston Hughes. His play on the offensive line led his offensive coordinator to remark, "he's the meanest guy I've ever seen". Glover was ranked a four-star recruit, a top-25 interior offensive lineman and one of the top-350 overall prospects in the 2025 recruiting class. He initially committed to play college football for the Alabama Crimson Tide. He later de-committed and ultimately signed to play for the Georgia Bulldogs in December 2024.

== College career ==
As a true freshman at Georgia in 2025, Glover won a starting role at right guard. He ended up starting 12 of 14 games for the Bulldogs and earned selection to the Southeastern Conference (SEC) All-Freshman team. He was also named a Freshman All-American and was ranked by ESPN as one of the top-10 freshmen nationally during the 2025 season.
