= Ryan Puglisi =

American football player

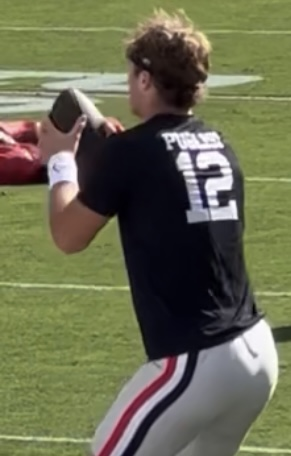
- Puglisi in 2025

No. 12 – Georgia Bulldogs
- Position: Quarterback
- Class: Junior

Personal information
- Listed height: 6 ft 3 in (1.91 m)
- Listed weight: 210 lb (95 kg)

Career information
- High school: Avon Old Farms (Avon, Connecticut)
- College: Georgia (2024–present)
- Stats at ESPN

Ryan Puglisi is an American college football quarterback for the Georgia Bulldogs of the Southeastern Conference (SEC).

== Early life ==
Puglisi attended Avon Old Farms High School in Avon, Connecticut. He started his high school career at Lawrence Academy in Groton, Massachusetts, where he earned his first college offer at the age of 15, before transferring to Avon Old Farms. As a senior, Puglisi threw for 1,858 yards and 15 touchdowns, while rushing for more than 350 yards and four touchdowns. In addition, he competed in the finals of the 2023 Elite 11 quarterback competition. Following his senior season, Puglisi was named the Gatorade Connecticut Football Player of the Year.

=== Recruiting ===
College recruiting
Name	Hometown	School	Height	Weight	Commit date
Ryan Puglisi; QB	Paxton, Massachusetts	Avon Old Farms High School	6 ft 3 in (1.91 m)	210 lb (95 kg)	Oct 16, 2022
Ryan Puglisi; QB	Recruit ratings: Rivals: 247Sports: ESPN: (84)				

Puglisi was rated a four-star recruit and a top quarterback prospect in the 2024 class. Puglisi committed to play college football at Georgia during his junior season after considering offers from Alabama and Michigan State. He signed his letter of intent in December 2023.

== College career ==
Puglisi began practicing as an early enrollee with Georgia during the 2023 season in preparation for the 2023 Orange Bowl. After redshirting in 2024, he made his collegiate debut in the 2025 season opener against Marshall, throwing for 59 yards and a touchdown.

=== Statistics ===
Season	Team	Games			Passing								Rushing			
Season	Team	GP	GS	Record	Comp	Att	Pct	Yards	Avg	TD	Int	Rate	Att	Yards	Avg	TD
2024	Georgia	Redshirted (redshirt)														
2025	Georgia	7	0	—	16	27	59.3	161	6.0	1	2	106.8	5	13	2.6	0
2026	Georgia	8	0	—	22	33	66.7	286	8.7	2	0	159.5	3	85	28.3	1
Career		15	0	0–0	38	60	63.3	447	7.5	3	2	135.7	8	98	12.3	1
