= Chris Cole (linebacker) =

American football player (born 2005)

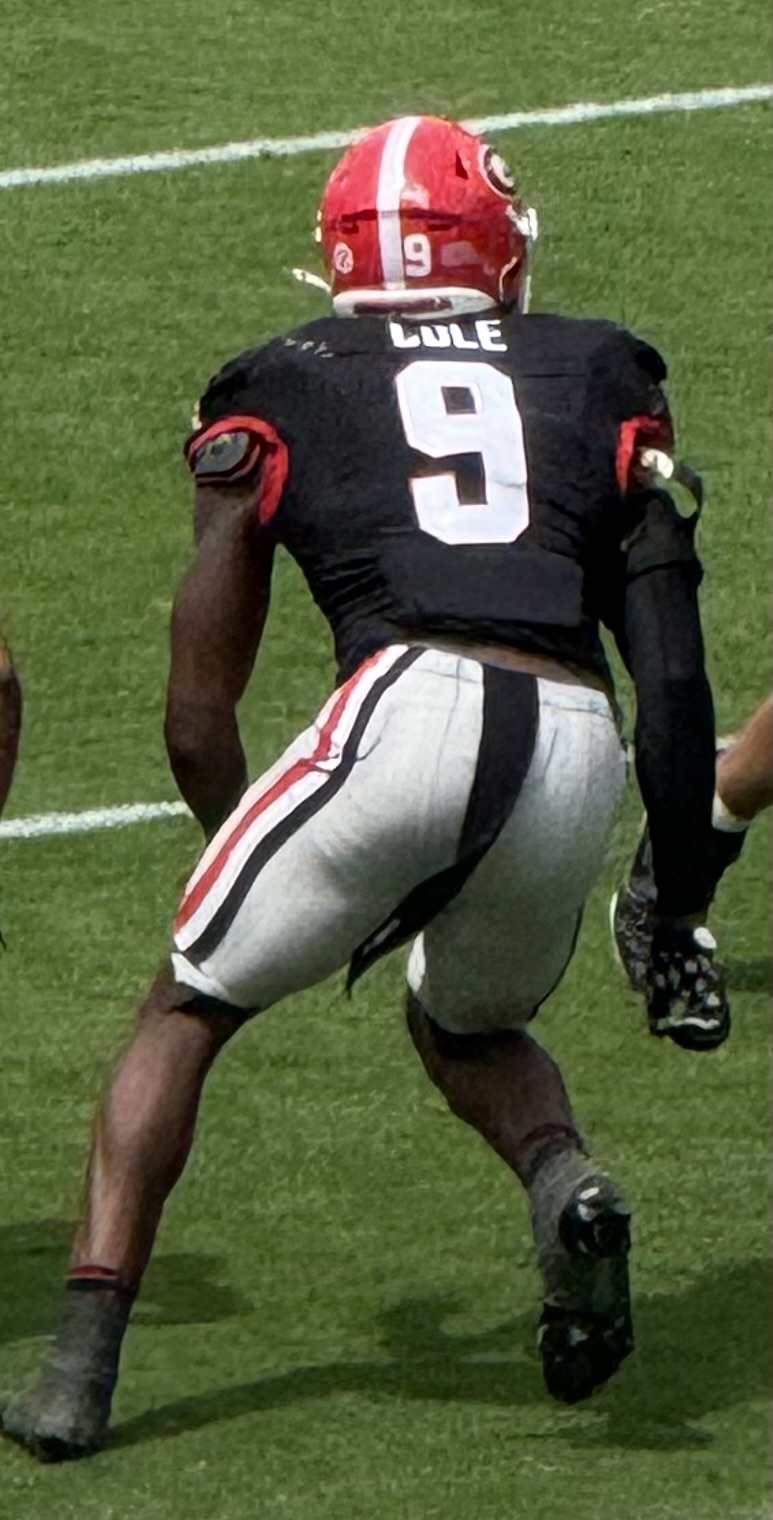
- Cole in 2026

No. 9 – Georgia Bulldogs
- Position: Linebacker
- Class: Junior

Personal information
- Born: October 3, 2005 (age 21)
- Listed height: 6 ft 3 in (1.91 m)
- Listed weight: 235 lb (107 kg)

Career information
- High school: Salem (Salem, Virginia)
- College: Georgia (2024–present)

Awards and highlights
- First-team All-SEC Freshman (2024)
- Stats at ESPN

Christopher Cole (born October 3, 2005) is an American college football linebacker for the Georgia Bulldogs.

== Early life ==
Cole attended Salem High School in Salem, Virginia. As a junior, he recorded 76 tackles and 11 tackles-for-loss. A four-star recruit and one of the top-rated players in the state of Virginia, Cole committed to play college football at the University of Georgia over offers from Miami, Penn State, and Tennessee.

== College career ==
As a true freshman, Cole totaled 16 tackles and two fumble recoveries, being named to the SEC All-Freshman Team. Entering the 2025 season, he was expected to earn a bigger role in the Bulldogs defense. Cole finished the season recording 60 tackles and 4.5 sacks.Against Oklahoma in 2026, he recorded a sack and two fumble recoveries, returning one 85 yards for a touchdown in a 41–13 victory. Cole was named SEC Defensive Player of the Week for his performance. He was named a Butkus Award semifinalist in October.
