= Harran Zureikat =

American football player

- Zureikat in 2025

No. 99 – Georgia Bulldogs
- Position: Placekicker
- Class: Freshman

Personal information
- Listed height: 6 ft 1 in (1.85 m)
- Listed weight: 190 lb (86 kg)

Career information
- High school: Shady Side Academy; Fox Chapel Area High School
- College: Georgia (2026–present)
- Stats at ESPN

Harran Zureikat is an American college football placekicker for the Georgia Bulldogs.

== Early life ==
Zureikat played association football (soccer) from the age of six and grew up participating in pick-up games at nearby Carnegie Mellon University. He first tried kicking a field goal during the summer before eighth grade, successfully converting a 40-yard attempt while on campus. "I didn’t think much of it, but my friends told me it was pretty good," said Zureikat. He started playing football as well, becoming the starting kicker on his middle school team.

== High school career ==
Zureikat initially attended Shady Side Academy in Fox Chapel, Pennsylvania, where he played soccer as a freshman before deciding to focus on football full-time. As a sophomore, he converted five-of-six field goal attempts (with a long of 43 yards) and averaged 39 yards per punt, garnering first-team all-conference honors as a kicker.

Zureikat transferred to Fox Chapel Area High School in O'Hara Township, Pennsylvania, midway through his sophomore year where he would finish his high school career. As a junior, he converted five-of-seven field goal attempts, (Note: Alternatively reported as five-of-nine) including a school-record 44-yard kick. Zureikat also had 14 punts for an average of 35.8 yards per punt. He garnered first-team all-conference and second-team Valley News Dispatch all-star honors at kicker. As a senior, Zureikat converted 19-of-20 extra points and seven-of-nine field goals. On September 26, 2025, he broke his own school record with a 54-yard field goal against Pine-Richland High School. The next week, Zureikat converted a 57-yard field goal against Franklin Regional High School, breaking the Western Pennsylvania Interscholastic Athletic League record. He collected first-team all-conference and first-team Valley News Dispatch all-star honors as a kicker; he also had 22 punts for an average of 42.8 yards per punt. Zureikat was named to the USA Today All-USA Second Team. He was also named a second-team All-American by MaxPreps.

That offseason, Zureikat was selected to participate in the 2026 Under Armour All-America Game with Team Perls, with his selection based on his performance at a Kohl's National Scholarship Camp. He converted a 46-yard field goal, which tied for the third-longest in the game's history, in a 23–9 win over Team Roses.

=== Recruiting ===
Zureikat was rated as a five-star recruit by Kohl's Kicking, both as a kicker and a punter. He was ranked as the top kicking prospect in the country in the class of 2026 by multiple outlets, including ESPN, Kohl's Kicking, and PrepStar Magazine. Despite not playing for a high-profile high school team, Zureikat was able to draw national attention due to his dominant performances at Kohl's Kicking Camps, which included a 65-yard field goal at a camp in Florida in January 2025. He was ranked as the No. 2 punter in the class at one point as well, according to Kohl's Kicking, and was ultimately ranked as the No. 4 punter in the final class rankings.

Zureikat received his first college offer from Syracuse in August 2024, followed by offers from Akron and Maryland, respectively. He subsequently received offers from Boston College as well as in-state programs Pitt and Penn State. On June 12, 2025, Zureikat verbally committed to playing college football at the University of Georgia. He had earned an offer from Bulldogs head coach Kirby Smart just two days prior, after competing with a pool of about 30 kickers at the team's summer specialty camps. Zureikat signed with the Bulldogs in December.

== Personal life ==
Both of Zureikat's parents were born in Jordan. He enjoys reading autobiographies to "see how [successful people] think".
