= Zykie Helton =

American football player (born 2008)

No. 55 – Georgia Bulldogs
- Position: Guard
- Class: Freshman

Personal information
- Born: March 15, 2008 (age 18)
- Listed height: 6 ft 3 in (1.91 m)
- Listed weight: 300 lb (136 kg)

Career information
- High school: Carrollton (Carrollton, Georgia)
- College: Georgia (2026–present)

Zykie Helton (born March 15, 2008) is an American college football guard for the Georgia Bulldogs of the Southeastern Conference (SEC).

== Early life ==
Helton grew up in Carrollton, Georgia. He entered foster care at nine years old before finding a home with his fourth-grade teacher Kimberly Perry and her family. He attended Carrollton High School and committed to play college football for the Alabama Crimson Tide. However, about a year later, he de-committed from the Crimson Tide, holding offers from schools such as Auburn, Georgia, and Texas A&M. Helton ultimately signed to play for the Georgia Bulldogs over Florida State and Georgia Tech.

== College career ==
As a true freshman in 2026, Helton was a standout in spring practices.
