= Jordan Hall (defensive tackle) =

American football player

No. 44 – Georgia Bulldogs
- Position: Defensive tackle
- Class: Senior

Personal information
- Listed height: 6 ft 4 in (1.93 m)
- Listed weight: 320 lb (145 kg)

Career information
- High school: Westside (Jacksonville, Florida)
- College: Georgia (2023–present)
- Stats at ESPN

Jordan Hall is an American college football defensive tackle for the Georgia Bulldogs.

== Early life ==
Hall attended Westside High School in Jacksonville, Florida. During his high school career he had 202 tackles and 19 sacks. He was selected to play in the 2023 All-American Bowl. A five-star recruit, Hall committed to the University of Georgia to play college football.

== College career ==
Hall recorded 10 tackles over 10 games his freshman year at Georgia in 2023 and four tackles over six games his sophomore year in 2024. He started all eight games he played in 2025 before suffering a season-ending knee injury and finished the year with 12 tackles. Hall returned to Georgia for his senior season in 2026.
