= Gentry Williams =

American football player (born 2004)

No. 26 – Georgia Bulldogs
- Position: Cornerback
- Class: Fifth year

Personal information
- Born: June 15, 2004 (age 22)
- Listed height: 5 ft 11 in (1.80 m)
- Listed weight: 190 lb (86 kg)

Career information
- High school: Booker T. Washington (Tulsa, Oklahoma)
- College: Oklahoma (2022–2025); Georgia (2026–present)
- Stats at ESPN

Gentry Williams (born June 15, 2004) is an American college football cornerback for the Georgia Bulldogs of the Southeastern Conference (SEC). He previously played for the Oklahoma Sooners.

== Early life ==
Williams attended Booker T. Washington High School in Tulsa, Oklahoma. He missed much of his junior season due to an ACL injury. Williams was selected to play in the 2022 All-American Bowl. He was rated as a four-star recruit and committed to play college football for the Oklahoma Sooners over offers from schools such as Florida, Missouri, and USC.

== College career ==
As a freshman in 2022, Williams notched seven tackles and an interception. In the 2022 offseason, he was hospitalized after collapsing during a Sooners workout. Williams made his first career start in week one of the 2023 season, where he made three tackles in a win over Arkansas State. Williams finished the 2023 season, totaling 30 tackles with four being for a loss, along with three interceptions.

On January 13, 2026, Williams announced his decision to transfer to the University of Georgia to play for the Georgia Bulldogs.
