= Talyn Taylor =

American football player

No. 1 – Georgia Bulldogs
- Position: Wide receiver
- Class: Sophomore

Personal information
- Born: Geneva, Illinois, U.S.
- Listed height: 6 ft 0 in (1.83 m)
- Listed weight: 190 lb (86 kg)

Career information
- High school: Geneva (Geneva, Illinois)
- College: Georgia (2025–present)
- Stats at ESPN

Talyn Taylor is an American college football wide receiver for the Georgia Bulldogs of the Southeastern Conference (SEC).

== Early life ==
Taylor was born in Geneva, Illinois and attended Geneva High School. As a senior, he was the Chicago Sun-Times High School Football Player of the Year and Beacon-News/Courier-News Football Player of the Year after recording 84 receptions for 1,617 yards and 24 touchdowns. A five-star recruit, he was selected to play in the 2025 Navy All-American Bowl. He committed to the University of Georgia to play college football.

== College career ==
Taylor played in six games his first year at Georgia in 2025 and had two receptions for 28 yards. Against No. 10 Ole Miss as a sophomore, he recorded four catches for 140 yards and three touchdowns in a 42–7 victory.

=== Statistics ===
Season	Team	GP	Receiving			
Season	Team	GP	Rec	Yds	Avg	TD
2025	Georgia	6	2	28	14.0	0
2026	Georgia	9	25	426	17.0	6
Career		15	27	454	16.8	6
