= Joseph Jonah-Ajonye =

American football player (born 2006)

No. 99 – Georgia Bulldogs
- Position: Defensive end
- Class: Redshirt Sophomore

Personal information
- Born: November 20, 2006 (age 19); Nigeria
- Listed height: 6 ft 4 in (1.93 m)
- Listed weight: 275 lb (125 kg)

Career information
- High school: Oak Ridge (Conroe, Texas)
- College: Georgia (2024–present)
- Stats at ESPN

Crucifixo Joseph Jonah-Ajonye (born November 20, 2006) is an Nigerian-American college football defensive end for the Georgia Bulldogs.

== Early life ==
Jonah-Ajonye was born in Nigeria, and his father was a basketball player. He grew up playing soccer before he immigrated with his mother and sister to the U.S. in 2015. His family initially settled in Maryland before moving to Texas. Jonah-Ajonye first played football as a freshman in high school. He attended Conroe High School his freshman year before transferring to Oak Ridge High School, which he attended the following three years. A defensive lineman, Jonah-Ajonye recorded more than 60 tackles along with 15 tackles-for-loss (TFLs) and 7.5 sacks during his junior year. In his senior year, he earned first-team all-district honors and helped his team to a record of 8–4.

Jonah-Ajonye was a five-star recruit and one of the top prospects in the class of 2024. He was ranked by ESPN as one of the best 25 recruits in his class. Jonah-Ajonye committed to play college football for the Georgia Bulldogs.

== College career ==
As a true freshman at Georgia in 2024, Jonah-Ajonye played four games, posting a tackle, before missing the rest of the year due to injury and redshirting. In 2025, he made 14 appearances while recording nine tackles and a pass defended. He saw more playing time in 2026, earning Southeastern Conference (SEC) co-Defensive Lineman of the Week honors for Week 6, after he recorded two tackles, a sack and a forced fumble in a win against Alabama.
