= Phil Rauscher =

American football player and coach (born 1985)

Georgia Bulldogs
- Title: Offensive line coach

Personal information
- Born: June 2, 1985 (age 41); Carlsbad, California, U.S.
- Listed height: 6 ft 4 in (1.93 m)
- Listed weight: 290 lb (132 kg)

Career information
- High school: La Costa Canyon (CA)
- College: UCLA (2003-2005)

Career history

Coaching
- UCLA (2006–2007) Student assistant; UCLA (2008–2009) Graduate assistant; Dixie State (2010) Offensive coordinator; Hawaii (2012–2013) Tight ends coach & recruiting coordinator; Cal Lutheran (2014) Offensive coordinator & offensive line coach; Denver Broncos (2015–2016) Offensive assistant; Denver Broncos (2017) Assistant to the head coach; Washington Redskins (2018–2019) Assistant offensive line coach; Washington Redskins (2019) Interim offensive line coach; Minnesota Vikings (2020) Assistant offensive line coach; Minnesota Vikings (2021) Offensive line coach; Jacksonville Jaguars (2022–2023) Offensive line coach; Jacksonville Jaguars (2024) Offensive line coach & run game coordinator; Georgia (2025) Offensive assistant; Georgia (2026–present) Offensive line coach

Operations
- Utah (2011) Administrative assistant

Awards and highlights
- Super Bowl champion (50)

Philip Rauscher (born June 2, 1985) is an American football coach who is the offensive line coach for the Georgia Bulldogs. He was formerly the offensive line coach and run game coordinator for the Jacksonville Jaguars of the National Football League (NFL). He previously served as an assistant coach for the Minnesota Vikings, Washington Redskins and Denver Broncos.

== Playing career ==
Rauscher was a lineman at UCLA from 2003 to 2005, before an injury suffered in high school reappeared and forced him to retire.

== Coaching career ==
=== College coaching ===
Rauscher stayed with UCLA as an undergraduate assistant at the request of Bruins head coach Karl Dorrell and offensive coordinator Tom Cable. After graduating, he remained with the program as a graduate assistant before going on to Dixie State as their offensive coordinator in 2010. He was an administrative assistant at Utah in 2011 for Utes offensive coordinator Norm Chow, who was UCLA's offensive coordinator when Rauscher was a graduate assistant.

After Chow was named the head coach at Hawaii in 2012, Rauscher was named the program's tight ends coach and recruiting coordinator. He was not retained by Chow and Hawaii after the 2013 season. Rauscher spent 2014 as the offensive coordinator and offensive line coach at Cal Lutheran.

=== Denver Broncos ===
Rauscher was hired as a coaching assistant for the Denver Broncos in 2015. He was a part of the staff that won Super Bowl 50 in 2016, Rauscher's first career Super Bowl ring. He was named the assistant to head coach Vance Joseph in 2017.

=== Washington Redskins ===
Rauscher was named the assistant offensive line coach for the Washington Redskins on March 20, 2018. He was promoted to offensive line coach during the 2019 season after offensive line coach Bill Callahan was named the Redskins interim head coach.

=== Minnesota Vikings ===
Rauscher was announced as the assistant offensive line coach for the Minnesota Vikings on January 27, 2020. He was promoted to offensive line coach on July 27, 2021, after Rick Dennison was reassigned to senior offensive adviser due to a lack of a COVID-19 vaccination.

=== Jacksonville Jaguars ===
On February 17, 2022, Rauscher was hired by the Jacksonville Jaguars as their offensive line coach under head coach Doug Pederson. Rauscher also became the team's run game coordinator starting in the 2024 season.

Rauscher was released under new coach Coen February 2025.

=== Georgia Bulldogs ===
On March 25, 2025, Rauscher was hired by the Georgia Bulldogs as offensive assistant. On January 20, 2026, he was promoted to Offensive Line Coach.
