= Bryson Beaver =

American football player

No. 18 – Georgia Bulldogs
- Position: Quarterback
- Class: Freshman

Personal information
- Listed height: 6 ft 3 in (1.91 m)
- Listed weight: 205 lb (93 kg)

Career information
- High school: Vista Murrieta (Murrieta, California)
- College: Georgia (2026–present)

Bryson Beaver is an American college football quarterback for the Georgia Bulldogs of the Southeastern Conference (SEC).

== Early life ==
Beaver attended Vista Murrieta High School in Murrieta, California. He became the starting quarterback as a sophomore, completing 184 passes for 2,550 yards and 26 touchdowns. As a junior, Beaver threw for 3,214 yards, 33 touchdowns, and six interceptions. Prior to his senior year, he participated at the Elite 11 competition. In the season opener of his senior season against Great Oak High School, Beaver completed 24 passes for 313 yards and two touchdowns. His season was prematurely ended after he broke a bone in his throwing hand. Beaver finished his senior year throwing for 1,753 yards, 18 touchdowns, and eight interceptions in nine games. Following his high school career, he committed to play college football at the University of Oregon for the Oregon Ducks. Beaver signed with the Ducks in December 2025.

== College career ==
In January 2026, Beaver announced his decision to enter the transfer portal, following the Ducks' signing of Nebraska transfer Dylan Raiola and the decision by incumbent starter Dante Moore to return for the 2026 season. On January 16, 2026, he announced his decision to transfer to the University of Georgia to play for the Georgia Bulldogs.
