= Gabe Harris Jr. =

American football player

Gabe Harris
No. 0 – Georgia Bulldogs
- Position: Outside linebacker
- Class: Senior

Personal information
- Listed height: 6 ft 4 in (1.93 m)
- Listed weight: 260 lb (118 kg)

Career information
- High school: IMG Academy (Bradenton, Florida)
- College: Georgia (2023–present)
- Stats at ESPN

Gabriel Isaiah Harris Jr. is an American college football outside linebacker for the Georgia Bulldogs.

== Early life ==
Harris initially attended Thomas County Central High School in Thomasville, Georgia, before transferring to Valdosta High School for his senior year. After the GHSA ruled him ineligible to play during his senior season at Valdosta, Harris transferred to IMG Academy in Bradenton, Florida. Following his graduation, he committed to play college football at the University of Georgia.

== College career ==
As a freshman in 2023, Harris played in 11 games and totaled nine tackles and a forced fumble. In 2024, he played in all 14 games and recorded 14 tackles, two sacks, and two forced fumbles. In 2025, Harris became a starter on Georgia's defense and finished the season with 26 total tackles, 6.5 tackles for loss, and a sack. Entering the 2026 season, Harris is expected to have an expanded role on Georgia's defense.
