= Nate Frazier =

American football player (born 2005)

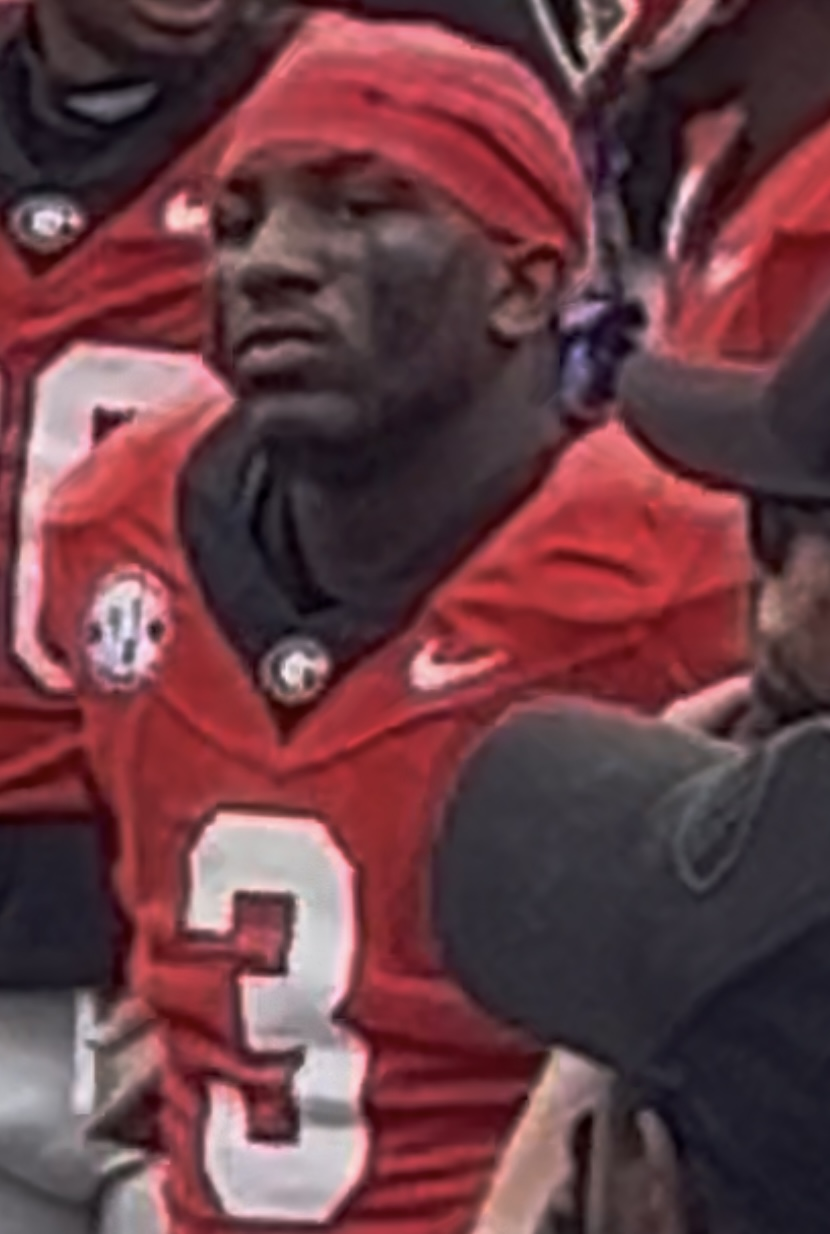
- Frazier in 2025

No. 3 – Georgia Bulldogs
- Position: Running back
- Class: Junior

Personal information
- Born: September 26, 2005 (age 21); Compton, California, U.S.
- Listed height: 5 ft 10 in (1.78 m)
- Listed weight: 205 lb (93 kg)

Career information
- High school: Mater Dei (Santa Ana, California)
- College: Georgia (2024–present)

Awards and highlights
- Third-team All-SEC (2025)
- Stats at ESPN

Nathaniel Frazier Jr. (born September 26, 2005) is an American college football running back for the Georgia Bulldogs of the Southeastern Conference (SEC).

== Early life ==
Frazier attended Mater Dei High School in Santa Ana, California. At the conclusion of his senior year, he was selected to the All-American Bowl. One of the top running back recruits in the country, Frazier committed to play college football at the University of Georgia, over offers from Alabama, Oregon, and Texas A&M.

College recruiting (2024)
Name	Hometown	School	Height	Weight	Commit date
Nate Frazier; RB	Santa Ana, California	Mater Dei High School	5 ft 11 in (1.80 m)	208 lb (94 kg)	Aug 6, 2023
Nate Frazier; RB	Recruit ratings: Rivals: 247Sports: ESPN: (84)				

== College career ==
In Frazier's collegiate debut against Clemson, he rushed for 83 yards and a touchdown on 11 carries. Against UMass, he rushed for 136 yards and three touchdowns in a 59–21 victory. Against Georgia Tech, Frazier scored the game winning two-point conversion run to secure a 44–42 victory after eight overtimes. He finished his true freshman season rushing for 671 yards and eight touchdowns.

=== Statistics ===
College statistics
Season	Team	Games	Rushing				Receiving			
Season	Team	GP	Att	Yards	Avg	TD	Rec	Yards	Avg	TD
2024	Georgia	13	133	671	5.0	8	12	85	7.1	0
2025	Georgia	14	173	947	5.5	6	16	116	7.3	1
2026	Georgia	8	77	476	6.2	9	6	46	7.7	0
Career		35	383	2,094	5.5	23	34	247	7.3	1
