= Kaiden Prothro =

American football player

No. 80 – Georgia Bulldogs
- Position: Tight end
- Class: Freshman

Personal information
- Listed height: 6 ft 6 in (1.98 m)
- Listed weight: 230 lb (104 kg)

Career information
- High school: Bowdon High School (Bowdon, Georgia)
- College: Georgia (2026–present)

Kaiden Prothro is an American college football tight end for the Georgia Bulldogs.

== Early life ==
Prothro lives in Bowdon, Georgia and attends Bowdon High School, where he plays baseball, basketball, and football. He had 33 receptions for 831 yards and 13 touchdowns during his sophomore season. As a junior, Prothro caught 56 passes for 1,203 yards and 22 touchdowns. He was also named second-team All-State during his junior basketball season after averaging averaged 20.7 points and 16.5 rebounds per game and was also an all-region selection in baseball.

Prothro is rated a five-star recruit and one of the top tight end prospect in the 2025 recruiting class. He committed to play college football at Georgia after considering offers from Florida and Texas.

== Personal life ==
Prothro's father, Clarence "Pop" Prothro, played college baseball at Jacksonville State.
