= Elyiss Williams =

American football player

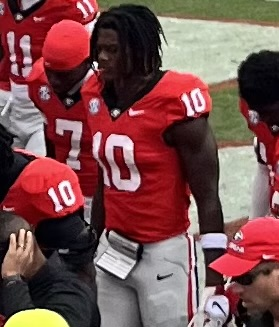
- Williams in 2025

No. 10 – Georgia Bulldogs
- Position: Tight end
- Class: Sophomore

Personal information
- Listed height: 6 ft 7 in (2.01 m)
- Listed weight: 255 lb (116 kg)

Career information
- High school: Camden County (Kingsland, Georgia)
- College: Georgia (2025–present)
- Stats at ESPN

Elyiss Williams is an American college football tight end for the Georgia Bulldogs of the Southeastern Conference (SEC).

== Early life ==
Williams initially attended Charlton County High School. As a sophomore in Charlton County's run-dominant offense, he had six catches for 192 yards and one touchdown. Williams averaged 16.9 points, 12.9 rebounds, and 3.8 blocks per game during his sophomore basketball season. He transferred to Camden County High School before the start of his junior year. Williams caught 25 passes for 530 yards and seven touchdowns in his first year with the team.

Williams is rated a five-star recruit and is the consensus top tight end prospect in the 2025 recruiting class. He committed to play college football at Georgia.

== College career ==
Williams joined the Georgia Bulldogs as an early enrollee and took part in the team's practices for the 2025 Sugar Bowl.
