= 2024 Georgia Tech vs. Georgia football game =

2024 American college football game

118th Clean, Old-Fashioned Hate Game
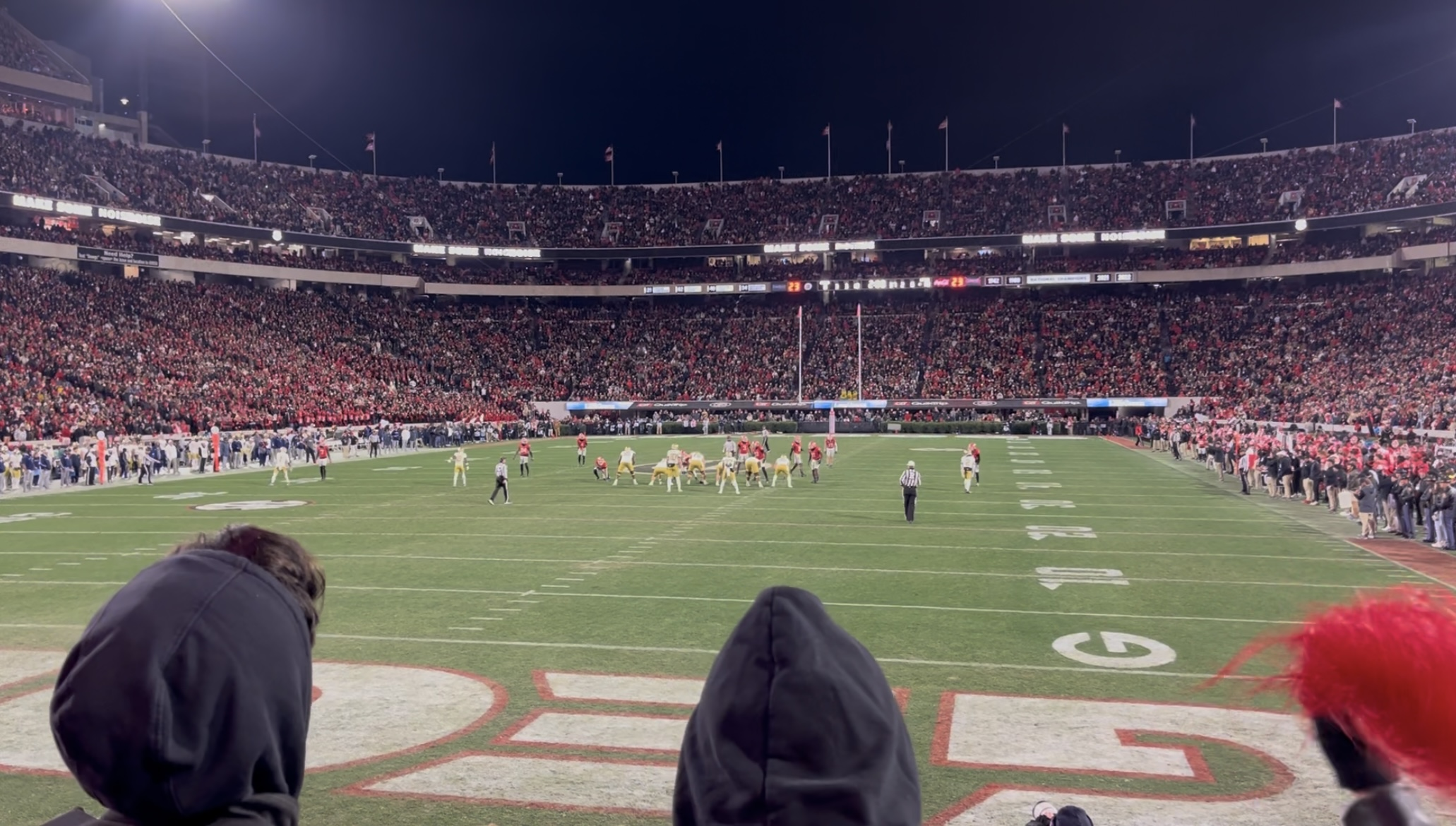
- Sanford Stadium on November 29, 2024
Georgia Tech Yellow Jackets	Georgia Bulldogs
(7–4)	(9–2)
42	44
Head coach: Brent Key	Head coach: Kirby Smart
AP / Coaches / CFP; RV / RV / NR	AP / Coaches / CFP; 6 / 6 / 7
	1	2	3	4	OT	2OT	3OT	4OT	5OT	6OT	7OT	8OT	Total
Georgia Tech	3	14	0	10	7	6	0	0	2	0	0	0	42
Georgia	0	0	6	21	7	6	0	0	2	0	0	2	44
- Date: November 29, 2024
- Season: 2024
- Stadium: Sanford Stadium
- Location: Athens, Georgia
- Favorite: Georgia by 20.5
- Referee: Jeff Heaser (SEC)
- Attendance: 93,033

United States TV coverage
- Network: ABC
- Announcers: Joe Tessitore (play-by-play); Jesse Palmer (analyst); Katie George (sideline)

The 2024 Georgia Tech vs. Georgia football game was a regular season college football game between the Georgia Bulldogs and the Georgia Tech Yellow Jackets, played at Sanford Stadium located in Athens, Georgia on November 29, 2024. Georgia won the game 44–42 in eight overtimes. The game's eight overtime periods were the second most in college football history, surpassed only by the 2021 Illinois vs. Penn State game, which went to nine overtimes.

== Background ==
=== Georgia ===
Georgia entered the game as one of the nation’s top programs, carrying a 9–2 record and finishing the regular season ranked No. 7 nationally. After back-to-back national championships in 2021 and 2022 and a 29-game winning streak that stretched into the 2023 season, the Bulldogs remained one of college football’s most dominant teams under head coach Kirby Smart. Despite suffering two losses during the 2024 campaign, Georgia still fielded one of the nation’s strongest defenses and a high-performing offense led by quarterback Carson Beck. The Bulldogs had also won five straight games in the rivalry and 18 of the previous 21 meetings, entering the contest heavily favored and seeking to extend their control over the "Clean, Old-Fashioned Hate" rivalry.

In addition, Georgia entered the game with a 30-game winning streak inside Sanford Stadium, representing the longest active home winning streak in college football at the time.

=== Georgia Tech ===
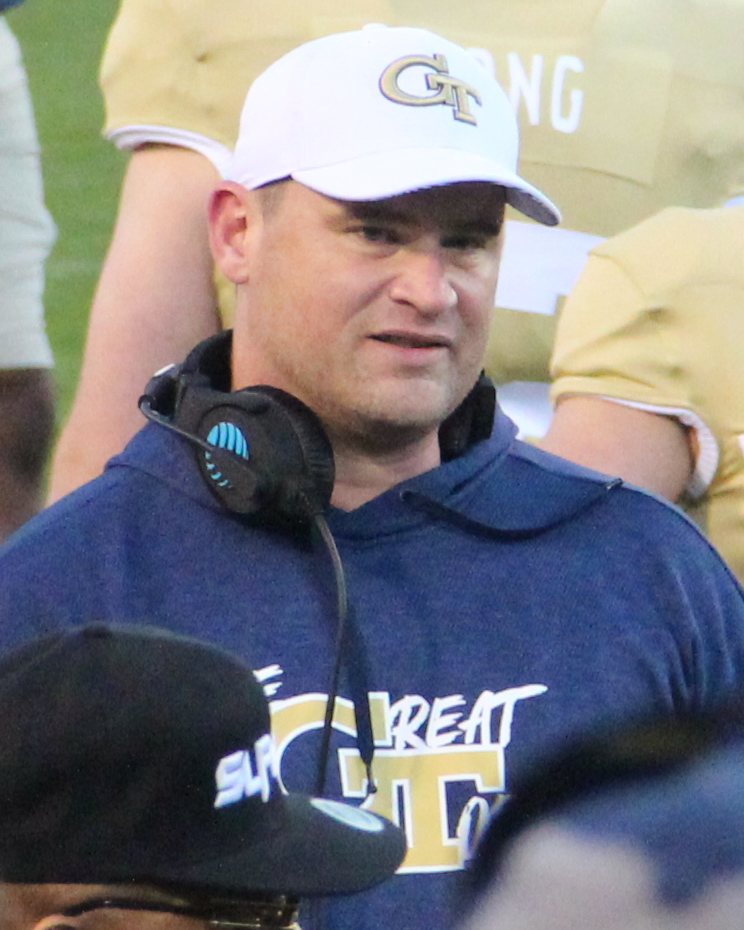
Georgia Tech head coach Brent Key

Georgia Tech entered the 2024 rivalry game with a 7–4 record, marking its second consecutive winning season under head coach Brent Key. The Yellow Jackets had made significant progress since Key took over full-time in 2022, posting their first back-to-back winning campaigns in over a decade. Throughout the season, Tech’s offense had been one of the strongest in the ACC, powered by quarterback Haynes King and a balanced attack that regularly produced both explosive passing plays and efficient rushing performances. With a bowl game already secured and momentum from their improved conference play, the Yellow Jackets came into the matchup looking to secure their first victory over Georgia since 2016.

== Game summary ==
=== First quarter ===
The game began with Georgia's Peyton Woodring sending the opening kickoff for a touchback, giving Georgia Tech possession at their 25-yard line. On the first play from scrimmage, Yellow Jackets' running back Jamal Haynes turned the corner on a handoff, rushing for 44 yards into Georgia territory. Following a short Haynes King run and second down incompletion intended for Eric Singleton Jr., the Yellow Jackets faced third-and-8 from the Bulldog's 29 yard-line. Georgia Tech converted on third down following a ten-yard King pass to Malik Rutherford, setting them up in the red zone. On first down, Haynes rushed up the middle for a short gain, before the Yellow Jackets were forced to use their first timeout of the half in order to avoid a delay of game penalty. The Yellow Jackets faced a third-and-4 and failed to convert following a completed screen pass to Haynes going for a negative gain despite Haynes breaking a couple of tackles. The drive culminated in a 31-yard field goal by Aidan Birr, and Georgia Tech led 3–0 with 10:38 remaining in the quarter.

Georgia's first drive began at their own 20-yard line following an 18-yard Cash Jones kickoff return. The Bulldogs' first drive began with a seven-yard Nate Frazier run but quickly stalled out after two incomplete passes from Carson Beck. Brett Thorson punted it 47 yards away and the Yellow Jackets began their second drive at their own 26-yard line. They quickly advanced down the field, following a 24-yard strike from King to Rutherford, followed by an 11-yard run by Chad Alexander to set up Georgia Tech squarely in Georgia territory. With a fresh set of downs, the Yellow Jackets rushed the ball four times, with four-different ball carriers, and were stopped on fourth down and one, turning the ball over on downs.

Following the defensive stop, Georgia took over on their own 26-yard line. Georgia converted a 3rd-and-4 from their own 32-yard line and gained another first down following a Dwight Phillips Jr. run to advance the ball near midfield. Facing 4th-and-3 inside Yellow Jacket territory, Beck found Dillon Bell for another first down. A completed pass to Arian Smith set the Bulldogs up near a first down, but they failed to convert, turning the ball over following two Frazier runs for no gain. With time for one play remaining in the first quarter, Haynes rushed the ball for 22 yards.

=== Second quarter ===
The quarter began with Georgia Tech starting on their own 36-yard line with a first down. The Yellow Jackets picked up three consecutive first downs, advancing the ball into the red zone. Facing a 3rd-and-4 from Georgia's 7-yard line, King found a wide-open receiver, Singleton Jr., but threw the pass just behind his man, resulting in an incompletion. On fourth down, Birr attempted a short 25-yard field goal that hit the left upright and was no good, failing to capitalize on a long 79-yard drive and keeping the score at 3–0 with 10:09 remaining in the half. The Bulldogs took over on their twenty-yard line and were forced to punt after a quick three-and-out, punctuated by Beck being sacked on third down by Clayton Powell-Lee. Taking over on their own 34-yard line, Georgia Tech swiftly advanced down the field, as after an 18-yard pass to Chase Lane put them in Georgia territory, a defensive holding called on the Bulldogs spotted the Yellow Jackets with a first down on the opponent's thirty-yard line. Georgia Tech converted a 3rd-and-8 from the Bulldogs 18-yard line setting them up with first and goal from the two-yard line. The Yellow Jackets capitalized on the opportunity, with King scampering into the endzone on a read option, scoring the game's first touchdown. The touchdown extended Georgia Tech's lead to 10–0, with 4:40 remaining in the half.

Georgia's subsequent possession began from their 25, quickly facing a third and long after two plays. On 3rd-and-9, Beck connected with Ben Yurosek for a 19-yard gain and a first down. On 2nd-and-1, Beck completed a screen pass to Dominic Lovett who lost control of the ball and turned the ball over to the Yellow Jackets. Beginning their next drive with decent field position, Georgia Tech converted two third downs en route to the red zone. As the half neared its end, King found Singleton Jr. for a 16-yard gain, giving the Yellow Jackets first and goal from Georgia's four-yard line. On third and goal King threw for his first touchdown pass of the game, finding Haynes on a screen pass who dove into the endzone for the touchdown, pushing out Georgia Tech's lead to 17–0. With just 30 seconds remaining the half, Georgia strung together a quick drive, completing an 11-yard pass to Lawson Luckie with just 0:01 remaining the half. Attempting to cut the Yellow Jacket's three-position lead into a two-position lead before halftime, Woodring tried a 53-yard field goal that missed wide right. Going into halftime, Georgia Tech held an unexpected 17–0 lead. It was the first time since the 2019 season that the Bulldogs had been held scoreless in the first half of a game.

=== Third quarter ===
Georgia received the kickoff to begin the second half. The Bulldogs' offense was quickly held to a three-and-out and was forced to punt it away. The Yellow Jacket's first drive of the second half ended with the same result, as the Georgia defense held them to a three-and-out. The ensuing 38-yard punt was muffed by Bulldogs returner, Anthony Evans III, but he recovered without turning the ball over. On the first play of the drive, Smith took a reverse hand off thirty yards, setting the Georgia offense up at the opponents 21-yard line. A few plays later, Beck completed a pass to Jones to the Georgia Tech eight-yard line. Beck finished the drive with a two-yard touchdown pass to Oscar Delp, putting the first points of the game on the board for Georgia. The Bulldogs elected to attempt a two-point conversion, failing to convert.

Following Woodring's kickoff, the Yellow Jackets began their drive at their own two-yard line. Deep in their own territory, King found Isiah Canion on a slant route for a thirty-yard gain. From there, Georgia Tech used a mix of pass and run plays matriculating down the field. The drive began with 9:53 remaining in the quarter, but the Yellow Jackets drained the rest of the clock. On the final play of the quarter, Haynes was stopped for a loss of two yards, setting up a third down and goal.

=== Fourth quarter ===
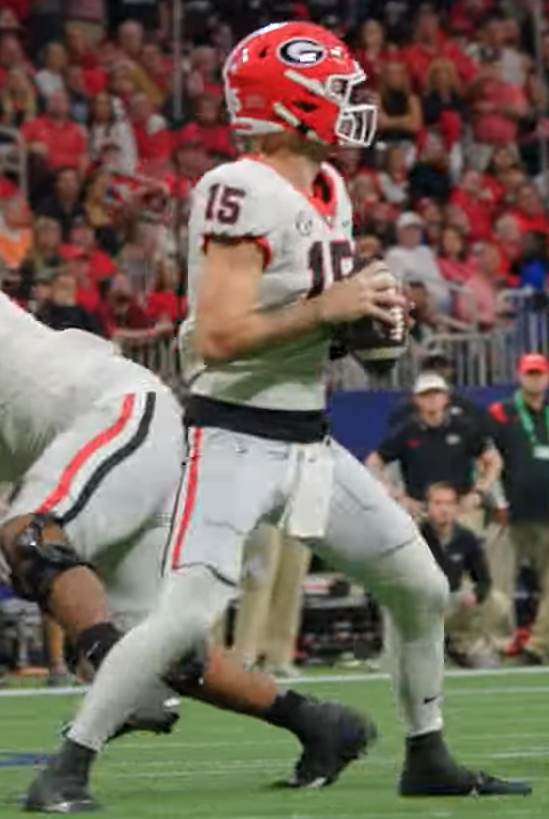
Georgia quarterback Carson Beck in 2023

On third and goal from Georgia's nine-yard line, King attempted to scramble in for the score but was stopped after a gain of three yards. Birr successfully kicked a 23-yard field goal, which extended Georgia Tech's lead to 20–6 with 14:17 left in regulation. Despite not scoring a touchdown, the drive consumed 10:36 of game time, maintaining the Yellow Jackets time of possession.

Starting at their 25, Georgia's offense began to move down the field. After advancing into Georgia Tech territory, a 15-yard completion to Lovett and a 14-yard run by Frazier set the Bulldogs up with a first and goal. On third and goal, Beck threw to a wide-open Smith who dropped a sure touchdown in the endzone. Now facing fourth down, Beck attempted to connect with Delp, but the pass was broken up. However, the play was flagged for defensive pass interference and Georgia were spotted the ball on the two-yard line. The drive culminated in a two-yard touchdown run by Frazier, cutting Georgia Tech's lead to 20–13 with 8:18 left.

On the first play of the next drive, Smael Mondon Jr. was flagged for a horse-collar tackle, advancing the Yellow Jackets near midfield. On a crucial third-and-7, King completed a pass to Singleton Jr. for 33 yards and a first down inside the red zone. King finished off the drive with an 11-yard touchdown run to extend the Georgia Tech lead to 14 points with just 5:37 left in the game. Needing a quick answer, Georgia unleashed an aerial assault, as Beck completed six passes in under two minutes, ending with a 17-yard strike to Lovett to bring the deficit back to just seven points with 3:39 remaining.

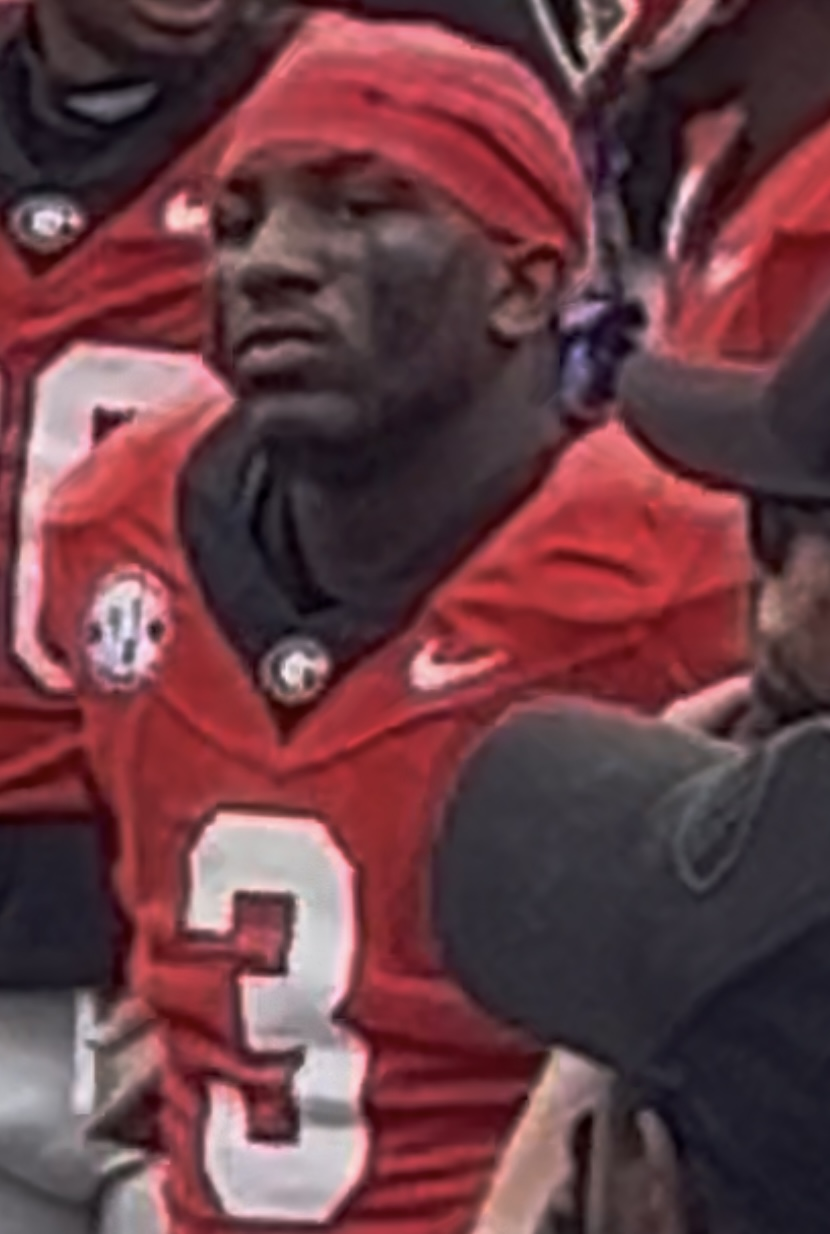
Georgia running back Nate Frazier who rushed for the game winning score in the 8th overtime

Only needing a couple of first downs to end the game, Georgia Tech began their next drive on their 22. They were flagged for a false start and a two-yard run set them up with second-and-12. On second down King delivered a completion to Abdul Janneh Jr. near the first down marker. On third and short, King attempted to rush for the conversion himself but was hit by Dan Jackson and fumbled. Chaz Chambliss recovered the fumble for the Bulldogs and set them up in prime field position at Georgia Tech's 32-yard line. A defensive pass interference and Beck scramble put the Bulldogs at the three-yard line with a first and goal. From there, Beck connected with Lovett for his second touchdown of the game, to tie the game at 27–27 with a minute left. The Yellow Jackets attempted to mount a game-winning drive but were thwarted on fourth down in Georgia territory. On the last play of regulation, Georgia attempted a Hail Mary heave, but Beck was strip sacked to close out the fourth quarter.

=== Overtimes ===
The game proceeded into one of the longest overtime periods in FBS history, ultimately lasting eight overtimes. In the first overtime, both Georgia and Georgia Tech scored touchdowns on their initial possessions, extending the game to a second overtime. Each team again reached the end zone in the second overtime, keeping the score level and triggering the NCAA’s two-point-conversion format beginning with the third overtime.

From the third through seventh overtimes, both teams repeatedly failed to convert their two-point attempts, with the exception of the fifth overtime, in which both teams successfully converted. In the eighth overtime, Georgia finally broke the stalemate when Nate Frazier successfully ran in the Bulldogs’ two-point attempt, ending the marathon game and securing the 44–42 victory for Georgia.

=== Scoring summary ===
2024 Georgia Tech vs. Georgia football game

Quarter	1	2	3	4	OT	2OT	3OT	4OT	5OT	6OT	7OT	8OT	Total
Georgia Tech	3	14	0	10	7	6	0	0	2	0	0	0	42
No. 7 Georgia	0	0	6	21	7	6	0	0	2	0	0	2	44

at Sanford Stadium • Athens, Georgia

- Date: Friday, November 29, 2024
- Game time: 7:30 p.m. EST
- Game weather: Clear • Temperature: 41 °F (5 °C) • Wind: NW 8 mph
- Game attendance: 93,003
- Referee: Jeff Heaser (SEC)
- TV announcers (ABC): Joe Tessitore (play-by-play), Jesse Palmer (analyst), Katie George (sideline)

Scoring summary

Quarter	Time	Drive			Team	Scoring information	Score	
Quarter	Time	Plays	Yards	TOP	Team	Scoring information	Georgia Tech	Georgia
1	10:38	8	61	4:22	Georgia Tech	42-yard field goal by Aidan Birr	3	0
2	4:40	8	66	3:57	Georgia Tech	Haynes King 2-yard touchdown run, Aidan Birr kick good	10	0
2	0:30	11	63	2:30	Georgia Tech	Jamal Haynes 4-yard touchdown reception from Haynes King, Aidan Birr kick good	17	0
3	9:53	6	51	2:39	Georgia	Oscar Delp 2-yard touchdown reception from Carson Beck, 2-point run no good	17	6
4	14:17	18	90	10:36	Georgia Tech	23-yard field goal by Aidan Birr	20	6
4	8:18	13	75	5:59	Georgia	Nate Frazier 1-yard touchdown run, Peyton Woodring kick good	20	13
4	5:37	6	75	2:41	Georgia Tech	Haynes King 11-yard touchdown run, Aidan Birr kick good	27	13
4	3:39	8	75	1:58	Georgia	Dominic Lovett 17-yard touchdown reception from Carson Beck, Peyton Woodring kick good	27	20
4	1:01	5	32	1:01	Georgia	Dominic Lovett 3-yard touchdown reception from Carson Beck, Peyton Woodring kick good	27	27
OT		4	25		Georgia	London Humphreys 14-yard touchdown reception from Carson Beck, Peyton Woodring kick good	27	34
OT		4	25		Georgia Tech	Eric Singleton, Jr. 12-yard touchdown reception from Haynes King, Aidan Birr kick good	34	34
2OT		3	25		Georgia Tech	Haynes King 1-yard touchdown run, 2-point pass no good	40	34
2OT		1	25		Georgia	Cash Jones 25-yard touchdown reception from Carson Beck, 2-point pass no good	40	40
5OT					Georgia	2-point pass good (Dillon Bell pass from Carson Beck)	40	42
5OT					Georgia Tech	2-point pass good (Malik Rutherford pass from Haynes King)	42	42
8OT					Georgia	2-point run good (Nate Frazier run)	42	44
"TOP" = time of possession. For other American football terms, see Glossary of American football.							42	44

=== Statistical summary ===
Team statistical comparison
Statistic	Georgia Tech	Georgia
First downs	28	24
First downs rushing	12	5
First downs passing	14	17
First downs penalty	2	2
Third down efficiency	7–15	6–12
Fourth down efficiency	1–3	1–2
Total plays–net yards	84–563	69–405
Rushing attempts–net yards	47–260	26–108
Yards per rush	5.5	4.2
Yards passing	303	297
Pass completions–attempts	26–37	28–43
Interceptions thrown	0	0
Punt returns–total yards	1–(3)	1–3
Kickoff returns–total yards	1–19	1–18
Punts–total yardage	1–38	3–162
Fumbles–lost	2–1	2–1
Penalties–yards	5–29	3–27
Time of possession	37:11	22:49

Georgia Tech statistics
Yellow Jackets passing
	C–A	Yds	TD	INT
Haynes King	26–36	303	2	0
Team	0–1	0	0	0
Yellow Jackets rushing
	Car	Yds	TD	Avg
Haynes King	24	111	3	4.6
Jamal Haynes	13	94	0	7.0
Chad Alexander	5	25	0	5.0
Malik Rutherford	1	20	0	20.0
Eric Singleton Jr.	3	14	0	4.7
Zach Pyron	1	0	0	0.0
Yellow Jackets receiving
	Rec	Yds	TD	Avg
Eric Singleton Jr.	8	86	1	10.8
Chase Lane	4	58	0	14.5
Jackson Hawes	4	46	0	11.5
Malik Rutherford	4	43	0	10.8
Isiah Canion	1	30	0	30.0
Ryland Goede	1	25	0	25.0
Abdul Janneh Jr.	1	12	0	12.0
Jamal Haynes	2	3	1	1.5
Chad Alexander	1	0	0	0.0

Georgia statistics
Bulldogs passing
	C–A	Yds	TD	INT
Carson Beck	28–43	297	5	0
Bulldogs rushing
	Car	Yds	TD	Avg
Nate Frazier	11	50	1	4.5
Arian Smith	1	30	0	30.0
Dwight Phillips Jr.	2	13	0	6.5
Carson Beck	7	10	0	1.4
Roderick Robinson II	4	3	0	0.8
Cash Jones	1	2	0	2.0
Bulldogs receiving
	Rec	Yds	TD	Avg
Cash Jones	4	53	1	13.3
Dominic Lovett	5	47	2	9.4
Lawson Luckie	3	38	0	12.7
Roderick Robinson II	2	34	0	17.0
Ben Yurosek	3	29	0	9.7
Dillon Bell	2	28	0	14.0
London Humphreys	3	21	1	7.0
Nate Frazier	2	18	0	9.0
Oscar Delp	2	15	1	7.5
Arian Smith	2	14	0	7.0

== Aftermath ==
With the win, Georgia earned a trip to the SEC Championship Game, defeating Texas, 22–19, in overtime. However, their season came to an end after losing to Notre Dame, 23–10, in the Sugar Bowl.

With the loss, Georgia Tech went to the Birmingham Bowl, where the Yellow Jackets lost, 35–27, to Vanderbilt.

== Controversies ==
Late in the fourth quarter just before the two-minute warning, Georgia Tech had the ball on their own 30-yard line on third down and one, where quarterback Haynes King fumbled which was recovered by Georgia defensive end Chaz Chambliss. However, controversially on the hit that caused the fumble by Georgia safety Dan Jackson, some argued that the hit should have been called targeting which would have given Georgia Tech the first down, and the ball back.

== See also ==
- 2001 Arkansas vs. Ole Miss football game
- 2003 Arkansas vs. Kentucky football game
- 2018 LSU vs. Texas A&M football game
- 2021 Illinois vs. Penn State football game
