= 2024 Georgia Bulldogs football team =

American college football season

2024 Georgia Bulldogs football

SEC champion

SEC Championship Game, W 22–19 ^{OT} vs. Texas

Sugar Bowl (CFP Quarterfinal), L 10–23 vs. Notre Dame
- Conference: Southeastern Conference

Ranking
- Coaches: No. 6
- AP: No. 6
- Record: 11–3 (6–2 SEC)
- Head coach: Kirby Smart (9th season)
- Offensive coordinator: Mike Bobo (10th season)
- Offensive scheme: Pro spread
- Defensive coordinator: Glenn Schumann (6th season)
- Co-defensive coordinator: Travaris Robinson (1st season)
- Base defense: 3–4
- Home stadium: Sanford Stadium

Uniform
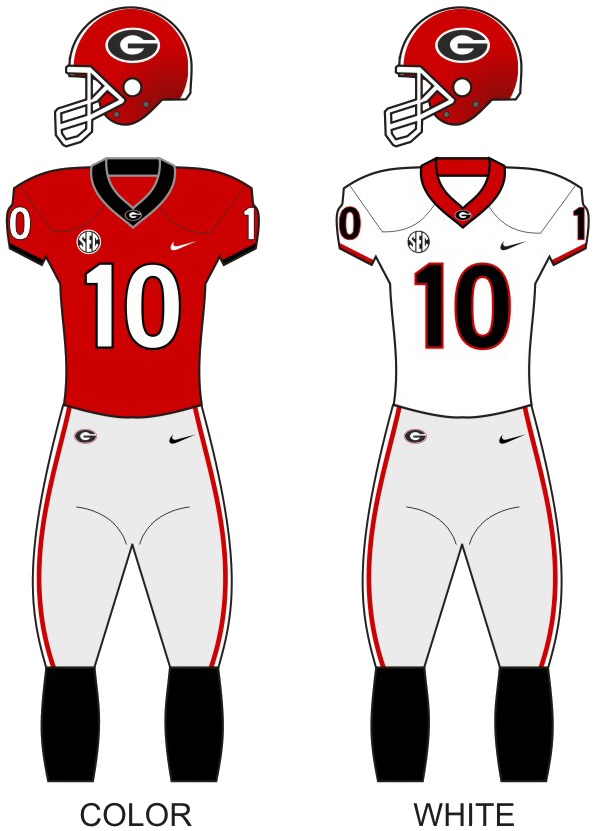

2024 Southeastern Conference football standings
	Conf.			Overall
Team	W		L	W		L
No. 4 Texas y^	7	–	1	13	–	3
No. 6 Georgia y$^	6	–	2	11	–	3
No. 9 Tennessee ^	6	–	2	10	–	3
No. 22 Missouri	5	–	3	10	–	3
No. 11 Ole Miss	5	–	3	10	–	3
No. 17 Alabama	5	–	3	9	–	4
No. 19 South Carolina	5	–	3	9	–	4
LSU	5	–	3	9	–	4
Texas A&M	5	–	3	8	–	5
Florida	4	–	4	8	–	5
Arkansas	3	–	5	7	–	6
Vanderbilt	3	–	5	7	–	6
Oklahoma	2	–	6	6	–	7
Auburn	2	–	6	5	–	7
Kentucky	1	–	7	4	–	8
Mississippi State	0	–	8	2	–	10
Championship: Georgia 22, Texas 19 ^{OT}
^ – College Football Playoff participant; $ – Conference champion; y – Championship game participant; Rankings from AP Poll

The 2024 Georgia Bulldogs football team represented the University of Georgia as a member of the Southeastern Conference (SEC) during the 2024 NCAA Division I FBS football season. The team was led by ninth-year head coach Kirby Smart, who notched his 100th win as head coach during the season.

The Bulldogs went 11–3 and won the SEC Championship Game against Texas, 22–19 in overtime. After the end of the season with Georgia's 23–10 loss to eventual runners-up Notre Dame at the Sugar Bowl, Smart called the season "the toughest year of my tenure. Easily the toughest of my tenure."

== Offseason ==
=== Team departures ===
Over the course of the offseason, Georgia lost 48 total players. Eleven players graduated, 12 players declared for the NFL Draft, while the other 22 players entered the transfer portal.

=== Transfer portal ===
Twenty two Georgia Bulldogs players entered the NCAA transfer portal during or after the 2023 season. Over the offseason, Georgia added eleven players from the transfer portal. According to 247 Sports, Georgia had the No. 15-ranked transfer class in the country.

Departing transfers
Name	No.	Pos.	Height/weight	Class	Hometown	New school	Sources
Nyland Green	#1	CB	6'1"", 185	(redshirt) Sophomore	Covington, GA	Purdue	
Andrew Paul	#3	RB	5'11", 200	(redshirt) Freshman	Dallas, TX		
A. J. Harris	#4	CB	6'1", 190	Freshman	Phenix City, AL	Penn State	
Marvin Jones Jr.	#7	OLB	6'5", 250	Sophomore	Sunrise, FL	Florida State	
Jackson Meeks	#9	WR	6'2", 205	Junior	Phenix City, AL	Syracuse	
Jamon Dumas-Johnson	#10	LB	6'1", 245	Junior	Hyattsville, MD	Kentucky	
Tyler Williams	#10	WR	6'2.5", 200	Freshman	Lakeland, FL		
Brock Vandagriff	#12	QB	6'3", 205	(redshirt) Sophomore	Bogart, GA	Kentucky	
Zeed Haynes	#13	WR	6'1", 170	Freshman	Philadelphia, PA	Syracuse	
CJ Madden	#16	DE	6'4", 230	(redshirt) Freshman	Ellenwood, GA	Purdue	
Xavian Sorey Jr.	#18	LB	6'3", 220	(redshirt) Sophomore	Campbellton, FL	Arkansas	
C. J. Smith	#18	WR	6'3", 190	(redshirt) Freshman	Apopka, FL	Purdue	
Darris Smith	#19	OLB	6'5", 240	Sophomore	Baxley, GA	Missouri	
De'Nylon Morrissette	#23	WR	6'1", 200	Sophomore	Stone Mountain, GA	Purdue	
EJ Lightsey	#25	ILB	6'2", 223	(redshirt) Freshman	Fitzgerald, GA	Georgia Tech	
Austin Blaske	#58	IOL	6'5", 310	(redshirt) Junior	Faulkville, GA	North Carolina	
Aliou Bah	#66	OT	6'5", 320	(redshirt) Freshman	Memphis, TN	Maryland	
Joshua Miller	#70	IOL	6'4", 315	Freshman	Chesterfield, VA	Syracuse	
Chad Lindberg	#78	OT	6'6", 325	Senior	League City, TX	Rice	
Logan Johnson	#82	WR	5'6", 155	(redshirt) Sophomore	Bogart, GA		
Jonathan Jefferson	#94	DL	6'3", 295	(redshirt) Sophomore	Douglasville, GA	SMU	
Jared Zirkel	#99	PK	6'3", 185	(redshirt) Junior	Kerrville, TX	Texas A&M	

Incoming transfers
Name	No.	Pos.	Height/weight	Year	Hometown	Prev. school	Sources
Colbie Young	#4	WR	6'5", 215	Junior	Binghamton, NY	Miami (FL)	
Trevor Etienne	#7	RB	5'9", 213	Sophomore	Jennings, LA	Florida	
Michael Jackson III	#13	WR	6'0", 200	Junior	Las Vegas, NV	USC	
Jake Pope	#21	CB	6'1", 192	Redshirt Freshman	Buford, GA	Alabama	
Brandon Mathis	#27	RB	6'0", 215	Redshirt Freshman	Fayetteville, GA	West Georgia	
Patrick Hester	#47	TE	6'5", 260	Redshirt Freshman	Johns Creek, GA	Army	
Xzavier McLeod	#64	DL	6'5", 284	Freshman	Camden, SC	South Carolina	
Kavon Townsend	#80	WR	6'2", 195	Sophomore	Conroe, TX	El Camino College (JC)	
London Humphreys	#83	WR	6'3", 186	Freshman	Nashville, TN	Vanderbilt	
Benjamin Yurosek	#84	TE	6'4, 242	Senior	Bakersfield, CA	Stanford	

Note: Players with a dash in the new school column have not joined a new team for the 2024 season.

=== Recruiting class ===
College recruiting (2024)
Name	Hometown	School	Height	Weight	Commit date
Ellis Robinson IV; Cornerback	New Haven, CT	IMG Academy (FL)	6 ft 1 in (1.85 m)	180 lb (82 kg)	Feb 1, 2023
Ellis Robinson IV; Cornerback	Recruit ratings: Rivals: 247Sports: On3: ESPN: (91)				
Justin Williams; Outside linebacker	Conroe, TX	Oak Ridge High School	6 ft 2 in (1.88 m)	205 lb (93 kg)	Jul 24, 2023
Justin Williams; Outside linebacker	Recruit ratings: Rivals: 247Sports: On3: ESPN: (90)				
KJ Bolden; Safety	Buford, GA	Buford High School	6 ft 1 in (1.85 m)	190 lb (86 kg)	Dec 20, 2023
KJ Bolden; Safety	Recruit ratings: Rivals: 247Sports: On3: ESPN: (90)				
Joseph Jonah-Ajonye; Defensive tackle	Conroe, TX	Oak Ridge High School	6 ft 4 in (1.93 m)	275 lb (125 kg)	Jul 6, 2023
Joseph Jonah-Ajonye; Defensive tackle	Recruit ratings: Rivals: 247Sports: On3: ESPN: (88)				
Chris Cole; Outside linebacker	Salem, VA	Salem High School	6 ft 3 in (1.91 m)	210 lb (95 kg)	Sep 10, 2023
Chris Cole; Outside linebacker	Recruit ratings: Rivals: 247Sports: On3: ESPN: (86)				
Jaden Reddell; Tight end	Raymore, MO	Ray-Pec High School	6 ft 5 in (1.96 m)	230 lb (100 kg)	May 24, 2023
Jaden Reddell; Tight end	Recruit ratings: Rivals: 247Sports: On3: ESPN: (86)				
Demello Jones; Safety	Swainsboro, GA	Swainsboro High School	6 ft 0 in (1.83 m)	185 lb (84 kg)	Mar 17, 2023
Demello Jones; Safety	Recruit ratings: Rivals: 247Sports: On3: ESPN: (85)				
Dwight Phillips Jr. Athlete	Mableton, GA	Pebblebrook High School	5 ft 11 in (1.80 m)	175 lb (79 kg)	Jan 28, 2023
Dwight Phillips Jr. Athlete	Recruit ratings: Rivals: 247Sports: On3: ESPN: (85)				
Nate Frazier; Running back	Santa Ana, CA	Mater Dei High School	5 ft 11 in (1.80 m)	208 lb (94 kg)	Aug 6, 2023
Nate Frazier; Running back	Recruit ratings: Rivals: 247Sports: On3: ESPN: (84)				
Jordan Thomas; Defensive tackle	Ramsey, NJ	Don Bosco Preparatory High School	6 ft 5 in (1.96 m)	296 lb (134 kg)	Jun 13, 2023
Jordan Thomas; Defensive tackle	Recruit ratings: Rivals: 247Sports: On3: ESPN: (84)				
Michael Uini; Offensive tackle	Copperas Cove, TX	Copperas Cove High School	6 ft 7 in (2.01 m)	335 lb (152 kg)	Jun 30, 2023
Michael Uini; Offensive tackle	Recruit ratings: Rivals: 247Sports: On3: ESPN: (84)				
Daniel Calhoun; Offensive tackle	Marietta, GA	Walton High School	6 ft 6.5 in (1.99 m)	365 lb (166 kg)	Jul 5, 2023
Daniel Calhoun; Offensive tackle	Recruit ratings: Rivals: 247Sports: On3: ESPN: (84)				
Ryan Puglisi; Quarterback	Avon, CT	Avon Old Farms School for Boys	6 ft 3 in (1.91 m)	205 lb (93 kg)	Oct 16, 2022
Ryan Puglisi; Quarterback	Recruit ratings: Rivals: 247Sports: On3: ESPN: (84)				
Kristopher Jones; Outside linebacker	Fairfax, VA	Fairfax High School	6 ft 2 in (1.88 m)	220 lb (100 kg)	Jul 30, 2023
Kristopher Jones; Outside linebacker	Recruit ratings: Rivals: 247Sports: On3: ESPN: (83)				
NiTareon Tuggle; Wide receiver	South Bend, IN	IMG Academy (FL)	6 ft 2 in (1.88 m)	195 lb (88 kg)	Apr 11, 2023
NiTareon Tuggle; Wide receiver	Recruit ratings: Rivals: 247Sports: On3: ESPN: (83)				
Chauncey Bowens; Running back	North Palm Beach, FL	The Benjamin School	5 ft 11 in (1.80 m)	219 lb (99 kg)	Jun 10, 2023
Chauncey Bowens; Running back	Recruit ratings: Rivals: 247Sports: On3: ESPN: (83)				
Nyier Daniels; Offensive tackle	Oradell, NJ	Bergen Catholic High School	6 ft 8 in (2.03 m)	360 lb (160 kg)	Jul 7, 2023
Nyier Daniels; Offensive tackle	Recruit ratings: Rivals: 247Sports: On3: ESPN: (83)				
Justin Greene; Defensive end	Lawrenceville, GA	Mountain View High School	6 ft 4.5 in (1.94 m)	260 lb (120 kg)	Jun 6, 2023
Justin Greene; Defensive end	Recruit ratings: Rivals: 247Sports: On3: ESPN: (83)				
Ondre Evans; Cornerback	Nashville, TN	Christ Presbyterian Academy	6 ft 0.5 in (1.84 m)	183 lb (83 kg)	Oct 18, 2023
Ondre Evans; Cornerback	Recruit ratings: Rivals: 247Sports: On3: ESPN: (82)				
Marques Easley; Offensive tackle	Kankakee, IL	Kankakee High School	6 ft 5.5 in (1.97 m)	335 lb (152 kg)	Jul 8, 2023
Marques Easley; Offensive tackle	Recruit ratings: Rivals: 247Sports: On3: ESPN: (81)				
Quintavius Johnson; EDGE	Atlanta, GA	Mays High School	6 ft 4 in (1.93 m)	242 lb (110 kg)	Jun 21, 2023
Quintavius Johnson; EDGE	Recruit ratings: Rivals: 247Sports: On3: ESPN: (80)				
Colton Heinrich; Tide end	Fort Lauderdale, FL	Cardinal Gibbons High School	6 ft 3.5 in (1.92 m)	232 lb (105 kg)	May 22, 2023
Colton Heinrich; Tide end	Recruit ratings: Rivals: 247Sports: On3: ESPN: (79)				
Malachi Toliver; Offensive tackle	Cartersville, GA	Cartersville High School	6 ft 6 in (1.98 m)	310 lb (140 kg)	Mar 26, 2023
Malachi Toliver; Offensive tackle	Recruit ratings: Rivals: 247Sports: On3: ESPN: (79)				
Nasir Johnson; Defensive lineman	Dublin, GA	Dublin High School	6 ft 4.5 in (1.94 m)	300 lb (140 kg)	Nov 15, 2023
Nasir Johnson; Defensive lineman	Recruit ratings: Rivals: 247Sports: On3: ESPN: (79)				
Nnamdi Ogboko; Defensive tackle	Garner, NC	South Garner High School	6 ft 4 in (1.93 m)	335 lb (152 kg)	Jun 25, 2023
Nnamdi Ogboko; Defensive tackle	Recruit ratings: Rivals: 247Sports: On3: ESPN: (78)				
Sacovie White; Wide receiver	Cartersville, GA	Cass High School	5 ft 10 in (1.78 m)	175 lb (79 kg)	Oct 10, 2022
Sacovie White; Wide receiver	Recruit ratings: Rivals: 247Sports: On3: ESPN: (78)				
Marcus Harrison; Offensive tackle	Hamburg, NY	Saint Francis High School	6 ft 7.5 in (2.02 m)	336 lb (152 kg)	May 23, 2023
Marcus Harrison; Offensive tackle	Recruit ratings: Rivals: 247Sports: On3: ESPN: (77)				
Drew Miller; Punter	Mediapolis, IA	Mediapolis High School	6 ft 2 in (1.88 m)	195 lb (88 kg)	May 19, 2023
Drew Miller; Punter	Recruit ratings: Rivals: 247Sports: On3: ESPN: (76)				
Overall recruit ranking:
‡ Refers to 40-yard dash; Note: In many cases, Scout, Rivals, 247Sports, On3, and ESPN may conflict in their listings of height, weight and 40 time.; In these cases, the average was taken. ESPN grades are on a 100-point scale.; Sources: "Rivals commits". Rivals.; "ESPN commits". ESPN.; "2024 Team Ranking". Rivals.com.; "247Sports commits". 247Sports.

*= 247Sports composite rating; ratings are out of 1.00. (five stars= 1.00–.98, four stars= .97–.90, three stars= .80–.89, two stars= .79–.70, no stars= <70)
†= Despite being rated as a four and five star recruit by ESPN, On3.com, Rivals.com and 247Sports.com, TBD received a four-, five-star 247Sports composite rating.
Δ= Left the Georgia program following signing but prior to the 2024 season

2024 overall class rankings

Website	National rank	Conference rank	5-star recruits	4-star recruits	3-star recruits

== Schedule ==
Date	Time	Opponent	Rank	Site	TV	Result	Attendance
August 31	12:00 p.m.	vs. No. 14 Clemson*	No. 1	Mercedes-Benz Stadium; Atlanta, GA (Aflac Kickoff Game, rivalry)	ABC	W 34–3	78,827
September 7	2:00 p.m.	Tennessee Tech*	No. 1	Sanford Stadium; Athens, GA	SECN+/ESPN+	W 48–3	93,033
September 14	7:30 p.m.	at Kentucky	No. 1	Kroger Field; Lexington, KY	ABC	W 13–12	61,663
September 28	7:30 p.m.	at No. 4 Alabama	No. 2	Bryant–Denny Stadium; Tuscaloosa, AL (rivalry, College GameDay)	ABC	L 34–41	100,077
October 5	3:30 p.m.	Auburn^{†}	No. 5	Sanford Stadium; Athens, GA (Deep South's Oldest Rivalry)	ABC	W 31–13	93,033
October 12	4:15 p.m.	Mississippi State	No. 5	Sanford Stadium; Athens, GA	SECN	W 41–31	93,033
October 19	7:30 p.m.	at No. 1 Texas	No. 5	Darrell K Royal–Texas Memorial Stadium; Austin, TX (College GameDay)	ABC	W 30–15	105,215
November 2	3:30 p.m.	vs. Florida	No. 2	EverBank Stadium; Jacksonville, FL (rivalry, SEC Nation)	ABC	W 34–20	76,307
November 9	3:30 p.m.	at No. 16 Ole Miss	No. 3	Vaught–Hemingway Stadium; Oxford, MS (SEC Nation)	ABC	L 10–28	68,126
November 16	7:30 p.m.	No. 7 Tennessee	No. 12	Sanford Stadium; Athens, GA (rivalry, College GameDay, SEC Nation)	ABC	W 31–17	93,033
November 23	12:45 p.m.	UMass*	No. 10	Sanford Stadium; Athens, GA	SECN	W 59–21	93,033
November 29	7:30 p.m.	Georgia Tech*	No. 7	Sanford Stadium; Athens, GA (Clean, Old-Fashioned Hate)	ABC	W 44–42 ^{8OT}	93,033
December 7	4:00 p.m.	vs. No. 2 Texas	No. 5	Mercedes-Benz Stadium; Atlanta, GA (SEC Championship Game, College GameDay, SEC Nation)	ABC	W 22–19 ^{OT}	74,916
January 2, 2025 (Note: The Sugar Bowl was originally scheduled for January 1, but was postponed a day later due to the terriorist attack that took place early that morning in the nearby French Quarter.)	4:00 p.m.	vs. (7) No. 5 Notre Dame*	(2) No. 2	Caesars Superdome; New Orleans, LA (Sugar Bowl–CFP Quarterfinal)	ESPN	L 10–23	57,267
*Non-conference game; ^{†}Homecoming; Rankings from AP Poll (and CFP Rankings, after November 5) - Released prior to game; All times are in Eastern time

== Game summaries ==
=== vs. No. 14 Clemson (rivalry) ===
No. 14 Clemson Tigers (0–0) vs. No. 1 Georgia Bulldogs (0–0) – Game summary

Quarter	1	2	3	4	Total
No. 14 Tigers	0	0	3	0	3
No. 1 Bulldogs	0	6	14	14	34

at Mercedes-Benz Stadium • Atlanta, Georgia

- Date: August 31
- Game time: 12:00 p.m.
- Game weather: Indoors
- Game attendance: 78,827
- Referee: Michael Roche
- TV announcers (ABC): Sean McDonough (play-by-play), Greg McElroy (analyst), and Molly McGrath (sideline reporter)

Game information
1st Quarter
- No score

2nd Quarter

- (8:49) Georgia - Peyton Woodring 30-yard field goal (Drive: 12 plays, 68 yards, 6:26; Georgia 3–0)
- (4:16) Georgia - Peyton Woodring 55-yard field goal (Drive: 5 plays, 31 yards, 2:05; Georgia 6–0)

3rd Quarter

- (12:01) Georgia - Colbie Young 7-yard pass from Carson Beck (Peyton Woodring kick) (Drive: 6 plays, 75 yards, 2:59; Georgia 13–0)
- (6:34) Clemson - Nolan Hauser 26-yard field goal (Drive: 12 plays, 66 yards, 5:27; Georgia 13–3)
- (3:15) Georgia - Nate Frazier 1-yard rush (Peyton Woodring kick) (Drive: 8 plays, 75 yards, 3:19; Georgia 20–3)

4th Quarter

- (9:57) Georgia - London Humphreys 40-yard pass from Carson Beck (Peyton Woodring kick) (Drive: 5 plays, 54 yards, 2:22; Georgia 27–3)
- (6:09) Georgia - Cash Jones 15-yard rush (Peyton Woodring kick) (Drive: 5 plays, 78 yards, 3:17; Georgia 34–3)

Statistics	CLEM	UGA
First downs	13	19
Total yards	188	447
Rushing yards	46	169
Passing yards	142	278
Passing: Comp–Att–Int	18–29–1	23–33–0
Time of possession	27:18	32:42

Team	Category	Player	Statistics
Clemson	Passing	Cade Klubnik	18/29, 142 yards, 1 INT
Clemson	Rushing	Phil Mafah	16 carries, 59 yards
Clemson	Receiving	Antonio Williams	6 receptions, 76 yards
Georgia	Passing	Carson Beck	23/33, 278 yards, 2 TD
Georgia	Rushing	Nate Frazier	11 carries, 83 yards, 1 TD
Georgia	Receiving	London Humphreys	2 receptions, 63 yards, 1 TD

=== vs. Tennessee Tech (FCS) ===
Tennessee Tech Golden Eagles (FCS) (0–1) vs No. 1 Georgia Bulldogs (1–0) – Game summary

Quarter	1	2	3	4	Total
Golden Eagles (FCS)	0	0	0	3	3
No. 1 Bulldogs	14	10	21	3	48

at Sanford Stadium • Athens, Georgia

- Date: September 7
- Game time: 1:00 p.m.
- Game weather: Sunny • Temperature: 85 °F (29 °C) • Wind: W at 5 miles per hour (8.0 km/h)
- Game attendance: 93,033
- Referee: Marc Curles
- TV announcers (SECN+/ESPN+): Jay Alter (play-by-play), Rocky Boiman (analyst), and Ashley Stroehlein (sideline reporter)

Game information
1st Quarter
- (12:27) Georgia - Dillon Bell 22-yard pass from Carson Beck (Peyton Woodring kick) (Drive: 1 play, 22 yards, 0:06; Georgia 7–0)
- (6:37) Georgia - Colbie Young 7-yard pass from Carson Beck (Peyton Woodring kick) (Drive: 7 plays, 58 yards, 3:44; Georgia 14–0)

2nd Quarter

- (11:45) Georgia - Peyton Woodring 27-yard field goal (Drive: 14 plays, 71 yards, 5:07; Georgia 17–0)
- (1:11) Georgia - Dominic Lovett 10-yard pass from Carson Beck (Peyton Woodring kick) (Drive: 7 plays, 80 yards, 3:12; Georgia 24–0)

3rd Quarter

- (12:54) Georgia - Arian Smith 50-yard pass from Carson Beck (Peyton Woodring kick) (Drive: 5 plays, 75 yards, 2:06; Georgia 31–0)
- (12:21) Georgia - Lawson Luckie 37-yard pass from Carson Beck (Peyton Woodring kick) (Drive: 1 play, 27 yards, 0:23; Georgia 38–0)
- (6:46) Georgia - Branson Robinson 10-yard rush (Peyton Woodring kick) (Drive: 10 plays, 69 yards, 4:34; Georgia 45–0)

4th Quarter

- (3:07) Georgia - Peyton Woodring 32-yard field goal (Drive: 7 plays, 37 yards, 2:49; Georgia 48–0)
- (0:00) Tennessee Tech - Hayden Olsen 32-yard field goal (Drive: 7 plays, 60 yards, 3:07; Georgia 48–3)

Statistics	TNTC	UGA
First downs	9	27
Total yards	134	498
Rushing yards	116	166
Passing yards	18	332
Passing: Comp–Att–Int	5–8–0	28–37–0
Time of possession	28:35	31:25

Team	Category	Player	Statistics
Tennessee Tech	Passing	Jordyn Potts	5/8, 18 yards
Tennessee Tech	Rushing	Aidan Littles	6 carries, 45 yards
Tennessee Tech	Receiving	D.J. Linkins	1 reception, 12 yards
Georgia	Passing	Carson Beck	18/25, 242 yards, 5 TD
Georgia	Rushing	Trevor Etienne	5 carries, 78 yards
Georgia	Receiving	Arian Smith	4 receptions, 73 yards, 1 TD

=== at Kentucky ===
No. 1 Georgia Bulldogs (2–0) at Kentucky Wildcats (1–1) – Game summary

Quarter	1	2	3	4	Total
No. 1 Bulldogs	0	3	3	7	13
Wildcats	3	3	3	3	12

at Kroger Field • Lexington, Kentucky

- Date: September 14
- Game time: 7:30 p.m.
- Game weather: Sunny • Temperature: 78 °F (26 °C) • Wind: E 6 mph
- Game attendance: 61,663
- Referee: Kyle Olson
- TV announcers (ABC): Sean McDonough (play-by-play), Greg McElroy (analyst), and Molly McGrath (sideline reporter)

Game information
1st Quarter
- (2:45) Kentucky- Alex Raynor 55-yard field goal (Drive: 5 plays, 15 yards, 2:32; Kentucky 3–0)

2nd Quarter

- (3:48) Georgia - Peyton Woodring 34-yard field goal (Drive: 4 plays, 7 yards, 0:57; Tied 3–3)
- (0:05) Kentucky - Alex Raynor 32-yard field goal (Drive: 13 plays, 61 yards, 3:43; Kentucky 6–3)

3rd Quarter

- (9:03) Kentucky - Alex Raynor 40-yard field goal (Drive: 11 plays, 61 yards, 5:57; Kentucky 9–3)
- (3:52) Georgia - Peyton Woodring 30-yard field goal (Drive: 11 plays, 63 yards, 5:11; Kentucky 9–6)

4th Quarter

- (6:46) Georgia - Branson Robinson 3-yard rush (Peyton Woodring kick) (Drive: 10 plays, 68 yards, 4:57; Georgia 13–9)
- (8:01) Kentucky - Alex Raynor 51-yard field goal (Drive: 11 plays, 43 yards, 4:19; Georgia 13–12)

Statistics	UGA	UK
First downs	12	23
Total yards	262	284
Rushing yards	102	170
Passing yards	160	114
Passing: Comp–Att–Int	15–24–0	14–28–0
Time of possession	24:58	35:02

Team	Category	Player	Statistics
Georgia	Passing	Carson Beck	15/24, 160 yards
Georgia	Rushing	Trevor Etienne	19 carries, 79 yards
Georgia	Receiving	Dominic Lovett	6 receptions, 89 yards
Kentucky	Passing	Brock Vandagriff	14/27, 114 yards
Kentucky	Rushing	Demie Sumo-Karngbaye	22 carries, 98 yards
Kentucky	Receiving	Barion Brown	3 receptions, 34 yards

=== at No. 4 Alabama (rivalry) ===
No. 2 Georgia Bulldogs (3–0) at No. 4 Alabama Crimson Tide (3–0) – Game summary

Quarter	1	2	3	4	Total
No. 2 Bulldogs	0	7	8	19	34
No. 4 Crimson Tide	21	9	3	8	41

at Bryant–Denny Stadium • Tuscaloosa, Alabama

- Date: September 28
- Game time: 7:30 p.m.
- Game weather: Cloudy • Temperature: 71 °F (22 °C) • Wind: E 6 miles per hour (9.7 km/h)
- Game attendance: 100,077
- Referee: Daniel Gautreaux
- TV announcers (ABC): Chris Fowler (play-by-play), Kirk Herbstreit (analyst), Holly Rowe, and Laura Rutledge (sideline reporters)

Game information
1st Quarter
- (10:11) Alabama- Jalen Milroe 7-yard rush (Graham Nicholson kick) (Drive: 8 plays, 70 yards, 4:49; Alabama 7–0)
- (4:39) Jam Miller 16-yard pass from Jalen Milroe (Graham Nicholson kick) (Drive: 6 plays, 84 yards, 3:11; Alabama 14–0)
- (2:21) Alabama- Germie Bernard 7-yard rush (Graham Nicholson kick) (Drive: 3 plays, 22 yards, 1:25; Alabama 21–0)

2nd Quarter

- (12:32) Alabama- Jalen Milroe 36-yard rush (Graham Nicholson kick) (Drive: 6 plays, 67 yards, 3:20; Alabama 28–0)
- (6:43) Georgia- Trevor Etienne 7-yard rush (Peyton Woodring kick) (Drive: 11 plays, 75 yards, 5:49; Alabama 28–7)
- (1:39) Alabama - Team safety (Drive: 3 plays, -5 yards, 0:15; Alabama 30–7)

3rd Quarter

- (5:06) Georgia- Arian Smith 12-yard pass from Carson Beck (Carson Beck pass to Lawson Luckie) (Drive: 15 plays, 80 yards, 6:44; Alabama 30–15)
- (1:23) Alabama - Graham Nicholson 28-yard field goal (Drive: 7 plays, 69 yards, 3:43; Alabama 33–15)

4th Quarter

- (9:55) Georgia - Lawson Luckie 8-yard pass from Carson Beck (Two-point conversion failed) (Drive: 6 plays, 80 yards, 2:35; Alabama 33–21)
- (5:39) Georgia- Dillon Bell 3-yard rush (Peyton Woodring kick) (Drive: 4 plays, 78 yards, 1:35; Alabama 33–28)
- (2:31) Georgia - Dillon Bell 67-yard pass from Carson Beck (Two-point conversion failed) (Drive: 1 play, 67 yards, 0:52; Georgia 34–33)
- (2:18) Alabama - Ryan Coleman-Williams 75-yard pass from Jalen Milroe (Jalen Milroe pass to Germie Bernard) (Drive: 1 play, 75 yards, 0:13; Alabama 41–34)

Statistics	UGA	ALA
First downs	27	21
Total yards	519	549
Rushing yards	80	175
Passing yards	439	374
Passing: Comp–Att–Int	27–50–3	27–33–1
Time of possession	27:47	32:53

Team	Category	Player	Statistics
Georgia	Passing	Carson Beck	27/50, 439 yards, 3 TDs, 3 INTs
Georgia	Rushing	Trevor Etienne	12 carries, 55 yards, 1 TD
Georgia	Receiving	Arian Smith	6 receptions, 132 yards, 1 TD
Alabama	Passing	Jalen Milroe	27/33, 374 yards, 2 TDs, 1 INT
Alabama	Rushing	Jalen Milroe	16 carries, 117 yards, 2 TDs
Alabama	Receiving	Ryan Coleman-Williams	6 receptions, 177 yards, 1 TD

=== vs. Auburn (Deep South's Oldest Rivalry) ===
Auburn Tigers (2–3) vs No. 5 Georgia Bulldogs (3–1) – Game summary

Quarter	1	2	3	4	Total
Tigers	3	0	7	3	13
No. 5 Bulldogs	7	7	7	10	31

at Sanford Stadium • Athens, Georgia

- Date: October 5
- Game time: 3:30 p.m.
- Game weather: Sunny • Temperature: 82 °F (28 °C) • Wind: NE 7 miles per hour (11 km/h)
- Game attendance: 93,033
- Referee: Steve Marlowe
- TV announcers (ABC): Sean McDonough (play-by-play), Greg McElroy (analyst), and Molly McGrath (sideline reporter)
- Box Score

Game information
First quarter
- UGA – Trevor Etienne 2-yard run (Peyton Woodring kick), 6:24. Georgia 7–0. Drive: 11 plays, 75 yards, 4:58.
- AUB – Towns McGough 27-yard field goal, 0:56. Georgia 7–3. Drive: 10 plays, 62 yards, 5:21.

Second quarter

- UGA – Dominic Lovett 11-yard pass from Carson Beck (Peyton Woodring kick), 0:17. Georgia 14–3. Drive: 5 plays, 49 yards, 0:45.

Third quarter

- AUB – Jarquez Hunter 38-yard run (Towns McGough kick), 9:45. Georgia 14–10. Drive: 6 plays, 68 yards, 3:45.
- UGA – Trevor Etienne 1-yard run (Peyton Woodring kick), 3:50. Georgia 21–10. Drive: 12 plays, 75 yards, 5:55.

Fourth quarter

- UGA – Dillon Bell 3-yard pass from Carson Beck (Peyton Woodring kick), 12:34. Georgia 28–10. Drive: 5 plays, 40 yards, 2:20.
- AUB – Towns McGough 26-yard field goal, 7:38. Georgia 28–13. Drive: 12 plays, 67 yards, 4:51.
- UGA – Peyton Woodring 47-yard field goal, 1:50. Georgia 31–13. Drive: 12 plays, 46 yards, 5:48.

Statistics	AUB	UGA
First downs	18	21
Total yards	58–337	66–381
Rushing yards	31–137	37–141
Passing yards	200	240
Passing: Comp–Att–Int	16–27–0	23–29–0
Time of possession	28:32	31:28

Team	Category	Player	Statistics
Auburn	Passing	Payton Thorne	16/27, 200 yds
Auburn	Rushing	Jarquez Hunter	13 rushes, 91 yds, TD
Auburn	Receiving	KeAndre Lambert-Smith	7 receptions, 95 yds
Georgia	Passing	Carson Beck	23/29, 240 yds, 2 TD
Georgia	Rushing	Trevor Etienne	16 rushes, 88 yds, 2 TD
Georgia	Receiving	Colbie Young	3 receptions, 51 yds

=== vs. Mississippi State ===
Mississippi State Bulldogs (1–4) vs No. 5 Georgia Bulldogs (4–1) – Game summary

Quarter	1	2	3	4	Total
Mississippi State	3	7	14	7	31
No. 5 Georgia	10	17	7	7	41

at Sanford Stadium • Athens, Georgia

- Date: October 12
- Game time: 4:15 p.m.
- Game weather: Sunny • Temperature: 77 °F (25 °C) • Wind: W 3 miles per hour (4.8 km/h)
- Game attendance: 93,033
- Referee: Kyle Olson
- TV announcers (SECN): Taylor Zarzour (play-by-play), Matt Stinchcomb (analyst), and Alyssa Lang (sideline reporter)
- Box Score

Game information
First quarter
- (12:05) Mississippi State - Kyle Ferrie 47-yard field goal (Drive: 4 plays, -3 yards, 1:24; Mississippi State 3–0)
- (7:09) Georgia - Peyton Woodring 45-yard field goal (Drive: 10 plays, 38 yards, 4:56; Tied 3–3)
- (2:13) Georgia- Branson Robinson 5-yard rush (Peyton Woodring kick) (Drive: 8 plays, 81 yards, 3:21; Georgia 10–3)

Second quarter

- (10:51) Georgia - Peyton Woodring 32-yard field goal (Drive: 13 plays, 51 yards, 5:52; Georgia 13–3)
- (8:46) Mississippi State - Kelly Akharaiyi 24-yard pass from Michael Van Buren (Kyle Ferrie Kick) (Drive: 4 plays, 75 yards, 2:05; Georgia 13–10)
- (6:32) Georgia - Dillon Bell 31-yard pass from Carson Beck (Peyton Woodring kick) (Drive: 5 plays, 75 yards, 2:14; Georgia 20–10)
- (1:56) Georgia - Lawson Luckie 1-yard pass from Carson Beck (Peyton Woodring kick) (Drive: 6 plays, 80 yards, 2:54; Georgia 27–10)

Third quarter

- (13:48) - Georgia - Arian Smith 42-yard pass from Carson Beck (Peyton Woodring kick) (Drive: 3 plays, 75 yards, 1:12; Georgia 34–10)
- (8:27) - Mississippi State - Johnnie Daniels 19-yard run (Kyle Ferrie kick) (Drive: 8 plays, 75 yards, 5:21; Georgia 34–17)
- (2:40) - Mississippi State - Davon Booth 2-yard pass from Michael Van Buren (Kyle Ferrie Kick) (Drive: 8 plays, 80 yards, 3:56; Georgia 34–24)

Fourth quarter

- (3:33) - Georgia Trevor Etienne 1-yard run (Peyton Woodring kick) (Drive: 16 plays, 81 yards, 7:26; Georgia 41–24)
- (1:47) - Mississippi State - Kelly Akharaiyi 35-yard pass from Michael Van Buren (Kyle Ferrie kick) (Drive: 9 plays, 75 yards, 1:46; Georgia 41–31)

Statistics	MSST	UGA
First downs	17	28
Total yards	63–385	77–605
Rushing yards	26–79	29–146
Passing yards	306	459
Passing: Comp–Att–Int	20–37–1	36–48–2
Time of possession	26:22	33:38

Team	Category	Player	Statistics
Mississippi State	Passing	Michael Van Buren Jr.	20/37, 306 yards, 3 TD, INT
Mississippi State	Rushing	Davon Booth	10 carries, 32 yards
Mississippi State	Receiving	Kevin Coleman Jr.	8 receptions, 103 yards
Georgia	Passing	Carson Beck	36/48, 459 yards, 3 TD, 2 INT
Georgia	Rushing	Anthony Evans III	1 carry, 52 yards
Georgia	Receiving	Arian Smith	5 receptions, 134 yards, TD

=== at No. 1 Texas ===
This game marked Kirby Smart's 100th career win as head coach with the Bulldogs' 30–15 victory against #1 Texas.

No. 5 Georgia Bulldogs (5–1) at No. 1 Texas Longhorns (6–0) – Game summary

Quarter	1	2	3	4	Total
No. 5 Bulldogs	7	16	0	7	30
No. 1 Longhorns	0	0	15	0	15

at Darrell K Royal–Texas Memorial Stadium • Austin, Texas

- Date: October 19
- Game time: 7:30 p.m.
- Game weather: Party cloudy • Temperature: 81 °F (27 °C)
- Game attendance: 105,215
- Referee: Matt Loeffler
- TV announcers (ABC): Chris Fowler (play-by-play), Kirk Herbstreit (analyst), Holly Rowe, and Katie George (sideline reporters)

Game information
First quarter
- (0:06) Georgia - Trevor Etienne 2-yard rush (Drive: 4 plays, 13 yards, 1:36; Georgia 7–0)

Second quarter

- (10:46) Georgia - Peyton Woodring 33-yard field goal (Drive: 7 plays, 13 yards, 2:43; Georgia 10–0)
- (8:30) Georgia - Trevor Etienne 15-yard rush (Drive: 3 plays, 34 yards, 1:29; Georgia 17–0)
- (4:43) Georgia - Peyton Woodring 48-yard field goal (Drive: 7 plays, 25 yards, 1:51; Georgia 20–0)
- (0:00) Georgia - Peyton Woodring 44-yard field goal (Drive: 4 plays, 4 yards, 0:25; Georgia 23–0)

Third quarter

- (10:57) Texas - Isaiah Bond 2-yard pass from Quinn Ewers (Quinn Ewers Pass to Isaiah Bond for Two-Point Conversion) (Drive: 8 plays, 55 yards, 4:03; Georgia 23–8)
- (2:12) Texas - Jaydon Blue 17-yard pass from Quinn Ewers (Drive: 2 plays, 9 yards, 0:48; Georgia 23–15)

Fourth quarter

- (12:04) Georgia - Trevor Etienne 1-yard rush (Drive: 11 plays, 89 yards, 5:08; Georgia 30–15)

Statistics	UGA	TEX
First downs	14	19
Total yards	74	76
Rushing yards	28–110	27–29
Passing yards	175	230
Passing: Comp–Att–Int	23–41–3	28–49–1
Time of possession	30:26	29:34

Team	Category	Player	Statistics
Georgia	Passing	Carson Beck	23/41, 175 yards, 3 INT
Georgia	Rushing	Trevor Etienne	19 carries, 87 yards, 3 TD
Georgia	Receiving	Oscar Delp	2 receptions, 45 yards
Texas	Passing	Quinn Ewers	25/43, 211 yards, 2 TD, 1 INT
Texas	Rushing	Quintrevion Wisner	15 carries, 52 yards
Texas	Receiving	Matthew Golden	3 receptions, 77 yards

=== vs. Florida (rivalry) ===
Florida Gators (4–3) vs. No. 2 Georgia Bulldogs (6–1) – Game summary

Quarter	1	2	3	4	Total
Gators	0	13	0	7	20
No. 2 Bulldogs	3	3	14	14	34

at EverBank Stadium • Jacksonville, Florida

- Date: November 2
- Game time: 3:30 p.m.
- Game weather: Sunny • Temperature: 82 °F (28 °C) • Wind: SW at 11 miles per hour (18 km/h)
- Game attendance: 76,307
- Referee: Daniel Gautreaux
- TV announcers (ABC): Chris Fowler (play-by-play), Kirk Herbstreit (analyst), and Holly Rowe (sideline reporter)

Game information

First quarter

- Georgia – Peyton Woodring 23-yard field goal, 2:10

Second quarter

- Florida – Aidan Mizell 43-yard pass from DJ Lagway (Trey Smack kick), 13:42
- Florida – Trey Smack 32-yard field goal, 7:22
- Georgia – Peyton Woodring 53-yard field goal, 0:43
- Florida – Trey Smack 53-yard field goal, 0:03

Third quarter

- Georgia – Nate Frazier 2-yard run (Peyton Woodring kick), 7:01
- Georgia – Cash Jones 22-yard pass from Carson Beck (Peyton Woodring kick), 1:20

Fourth quarter

- Florida – Ja'Kobi Jackson 15-yard run (Trey Smack kick), 7:29
- Georgia – Dominic Lovett 10-yard pass from Carson Beck (Peyton Woodring kick), 4:01
- Georgia – Dwight Phillips Jr. 4-yard run (Peyton Woodring kick), 3:03

Statistics	UF	UGA
First downs	13	26
Total yards	228	455
Rushing yards	115	146
Passing yards	113	309
Passing: Comp–Att–Int	9–30–1	25–40–3
Time of possession	26:25	33:30

Team	Category	Player	Statistics
Florida	Passing	Aidan Warner	7/22, 66 yards, INT
Florida	Rushing	Ja'Kobi Jackson	12 carries, 74 yards, TD
Florida	Receiving	Aidan Mizell	4 receptions, 66 yards, TD
Georgia	Passing	Carson Beck	25/40, 309 yards, 2 TD, 3 INT
Georgia	Rushing	Nate Frazier	19 carries, 82 yards, TD
Georgia	Receiving	Arian Smith	2 receptions, 59 yards

=== at No. 16 Ole Miss ===
No. 3 Georgia Bulldogs (7–1) at No. 16 Ole Miss Rebels (7–2) – Game summary

Quarter	1	2	3	4	Total
No. 3 Bulldogs	7	0	3	0	10
No. 16 Rebels	10	6	6	6	28

at Vaught–Hemingway Stadium • Oxford, Mississippi

- Date: November 9
- Game time: 3:30 p.m.
- Game weather: Rain • Temperature: 67 °F (19 °C)
- Game attendance: 68,126
- Referee: Jeff Heaser
- TV announcers (ABC): Sean McDonough (play-by-play), Greg McElroy (analyst), and Molly McGrath (sideline reporter)

Game information

First quarter

- (10:32) Georgia - Nate Frazier 2 Yd Run (Peyton Woodring Kick) (Drive: 7 plays, 21 yards, 3:21; Georgia 7–0)
- (6:53) Ole Miss - Ulysses Bentley IV 9 Yd Run (Caden Davis Kick) (Drive: 10 plays, 75 yards, 3:39; Tied 7–7)
- (3:01) Ole Miss - Caden Davis 23 Yd Field Goal (Drive: 6 plays, 44 yards, 2:04; Ole Miss 10–7)

Second quarter

- (12:12) Ole Miss - Caden Davis 43 Yd Field Goal (Drive: 9 plays, 51 yards, 4:08; Ole Miss 13–7)
- (2:55) Ole Miss - Caden Davis 53 Yd Field Goal (Drive: 10 plays, 63 yards, 4:19; Ole Miss 16–7)

Third quarter

- (9:44) Georgia - Peyton Woodring 23 Yd Field Goal (Drive: 9 plays, 70 yards, 5:16; Ole Miss 16–10)
- (6:10) Ole Miss - Antwane Wells Jr. 10 Yd pass from Jaxson Dart (Two-Point Pass Conversion Failed) (Drive: 8 plays, 75 yards, 3:34; Ole Miss 22–10)

Fourth quarter

- (3:22) Ole Miss - Caden Davis 24 Yd Field Goal (Drive: 10 plays, 68 yards, 4:00; Ole Miss 25–10)
- (1:11) Ole Miss - Caden Davis 32 Yd Field Goal (Drive: 4 plays, 5 yards, 1:57; Ole Miss 28–10)

Statistics	UGA	MISS
First downs	16	19
Total yards	245	395
Rushing yards	59	132
Passing yards	186	263
Passing: Comp–Att–Int	20–31–1	18–28–1
Time of possession	32:15	27:45

Team	Category	Player	Statistics
Georgia	Passing	Carson Beck	20/31, 186 yards, INT
Georgia	Rushing	Nate Frazier	12 carries, 47 yards, TD
Georgia	Receiving	Dominic Lovett	4 receptions, 41 yards
Ole Miss	Passing	Jaxson Dart	13/22, 199 yards, TD, INT
Ole Miss	Rushing	Jaxson Dart	8 carries, 50 yards
Ole Miss	Receiving	Cayden Lee	4 receptions, 81 yards

=== vs. No. 7 Tennessee (rivalry) ===
No. 7 Tennessee Volunteers (8–1) vs No. 12 Georgia Bulldogs (7–2) – Game summary

Quarter	1	2	3	4	Total
No. 7 Volunteers	10	7	0	0	17
No. 12 Bulldogs	0	17	7	7	31

at Sanford Stadium • Athens, Georgia

- Date: November 16
- Game time: 7:30 PM
- Game weather: Clear • Temperature: 55 °F (13 °C) • Wind: S 1 mile per hour (1.6 km/h)
- Game attendance: 93,033
- Referee: David Smith
- TV announcers (ABC): Chris Fowler (play-by-play), Kirk Herbstreit (analyst), Holly Rowe, and Laura Rutledge (sideline reporters)

Game information

First quarter

- (10:09) TEN – Miles Kitselman 1-yard run, Max Gilbert kick (Drive: 12 plays, 78 yards, 3:47; Tennessee 7–0)
- (0:43) TEN – Max Gilbert 52-yard field goal (Drive: 4 plays, 3 yards, 1:54; Tennessee 10–0)

Second quarter

- (13:30) UGA – Oscar Delp 19-yard pass from Carson Beck, Peyton Woodring kick (Drive: 7 plays, 75 yards, 2:13; Tennessee 10–7)
- (6:36) UGA – Oscar Delp 4-yard pass from Carson Beck, Peyton Woodring kick (Drive: 10 plays, 84 yards, 4:26; Georgia 14–10)
- (1:54) TEN – Dylan Sampson 27-yard run, Max Gilbert kick (Drive: 10 plays, 75 yards, 4:42; Tennessee 17–14)
- (0:05) UGA – Peyton Woodring 36-yard field goal (Drive: 11 plays, 57 yards, 1:49; Tied 17–17)

Third quarter

- (5:32) UGA – Carson Beck 10-yard run, Peyton Woodring kick (Drive: 12 plays, 87 yards, 7:22; Georgia 24–17)

Fourth quarter

- (2:26) UGA – Nate Frazier 2-yard run, Peyton Woodring kick (Drive: 12 plays, 92 yards, 6:21; Georgia 31–17)

Statistics	TENN	UGA
First downs	20	25
Total yards	319	453
Rushing yards	152	106
Passing yards	167	347
Passing: Comp–Att–Int	20–33–0	25–40–0
Time of possession	29:31	30:29

Team	Category	Player	Statistics
Tennessee	Passing	Nico Iamaleava	20/33, 167 yards
Tennessee	Rushing	Dylan Sampson	19 carries, 101 yards, TD
Tennessee	Receiving	Miles Kitselman	4 receptions, 46 yards
Georgia	Passing	Carson Beck	25/40, 347 yards, 2 TD
Georgia	Rushing	Nate Frazier	19 carries, 68 yards, TD
Georgia	Receiving	London Humphreys	3 receptions, 63 yards

=== vs. UMass ===
UMass Minutemen (2–8) vs No. 10 Georgia Bulldogs (8–2) – Game summary

Quarter	1	2	3	4	Total
Minutemen	7	7	7	0	21
No. 10 Bulldogs	7	21	17	14	59

at Sanford Stadium • Athens, Georgia

- Date: November 23
- Game time: 12:45 p.m.
- Game weather: Sunny • Temperature: 57 °F (14 °C)
- Game attendance: 93,033
- Referee: Lee Hedrick
- TV announcers (SECN): Dave Neal (play-by-play), Max Starks (analyst), and Ashley ShahAhmadi (sideline reporter)

Statistics	MASS	UGA
First downs	14	34
Total yards	351	550
Rushing yards	226	208
Passing yards	125	342
Passing: Comp–Att–Int	8–17–0	23–35–0
Time of possession	30:04	29:56

Team	Category	Player	Statistics
UMass	Passing	AJ Hairston	7/16, 121 yds, TD
UMass	Rushing	John Jalen	9 rushes, 107 yds, TD
UMass	Receiving	Jakobie Keeney-James	3 receptions, 101 yds, TD
Georgia	Passing	Carson Beck	20/31, 297 yds, 4 TD
Georgia	Rushing	Nate Frazier	21 rushes, 136 yds, 3 TD
Georgia	Receiving	Arian Smith	3 receptions, 110 yds, TD

=== vs. Georgia Tech (Clean, Old-Fashioned Hate) ===
Georgia came back from a 17–0 halftime deficit at home to force overtime. The game was decided in 8OT, which is the second longest game in FBS history by total number of overtimes. This was the fourth time, and second since 2013, that the game was decided in overtime. The previous longest game between the two teams was 2OT.

Georgia Tech Yellow Jackets (7–4) vs No. 7 Georgia Bulldogs (9–2) – Game summary

Quarter	1	2	3	4	OT	2OT	3OT	4OT	5OT	6OT	7OT	8OT	Total
Yellow Jackets	3	14	0	10	7	6	0	0	2	0	0	0	42
No. 7 Bulldogs	0	0	6	21	7	6	0	0	2	0	0	2	44

at Sanford Stadium, Athens, Georgia

- Date: November 29
- Game time: 7:30 PM
- Game weather: Clear • Temperature: 43 °F (6 °C)
- Game attendance: 93,033
- Referee: Jeff Heaser
- TV announcers (ABC): Joe Tessitore (play-by-play), Jesse Palmer (analyst), and Katie George (sideline reporter)

Game information

First quarter

- (10:35) GT – Aidan Birr 31-yard field goal (Drive: 8 plays, 61 yards, 4:22; Georgia Tech 3–0)

Second quarter

- (4:40) GT - Haynes King 2-yard run, Aidan Birr kick (Drive: 8 plays, 66 yards 3:57; Georgia Tech 10–0)
- (0:30) GT - Jamal Haynes 4-yard pass from Haynes King, Aidan Birr kick (Drive: 11 plays, 62 yards 2:30; Georgia Tech 17–0)

Third quarter

- (9:53) UGA – Oscar Delp 2-yard pass from Carson Beck, (2 point conversion failed)(Drive: 6 plays, 51 yards, 2:39; Georgia Tech 17–7)

Fourth quarter

- (14:17) GT – Aidan Birr 23-yard field goal (Drive: 18 plays, 90 yards, 10:36; Georgia Tech 20–6)
- (8:18) UGA – Nate Frazier 1-yard run, Peyton Woodring kick (Drive: 13 plays, 75 yards, 5:59; Georgia Tech 20–13)
- (5:37) GT - Haynes King 11-yard run, Aidan Birr kick (Drive: 6 plays, 75 yards 2:41; Georgia Tech 27–13)
- (3:39) UGA – Dominic Lovett 17-yard pass from Carson Beck, Peyton Woodring kick (Drive: 8 plays, 75 yards, 1:58; Georgia Tech 27–20)
- (1:01) UGA – Dominic Lovett 3-yard pass from Carson Beck, Peyton Woodring kick (Drive: 5 plays, 32 yards, 1:04; Tied 27–27)

Overtime 1

- UGA – Landon Humphreys 14-yard pass from Carson Beck, Peyton Woodring kick (Drive: 4 plays, 25 yards; Georgia 34–27)
- GT – Eric Singleton 12-yard pass from Haynes King, Aidan Birr kick (Drive: 4 plays, 25 yards; Tied 34–34)

Overtime 2

- GT - Haynes King 1-yard run, (Two point conversion failed)(Drive: 3 plays 25 yards; Georgia Tech 40–34)
- UGA - Cash Jones 25-yard pass from Caron Beck, (Two point conversion failed)(Drive: 1 play, 25 yards, Tied 40–40)

Overtime 3

No Score

Overtime 4

No Score

Overtime 5

- UGA - Carson Beck pass to Dillon Bell for two point conversion (Georgia 42–40)
- GT - Haynes King pass to Malik Rutherford for two point conversion (Tied 42–42)

Overtime 6

No Score

Overtime 7

No Score

Overtime 8

- UGA - Nate Frazier run for two point conversion (Georgia 44–42)

Statistics	GT	UGA
First downs	28	24
Total yards	563	405
Rushing yards	260	108
Passing yards	303	297
Passing: Comp–Att–Int	26–37–0	28–43–0
Time of possession	37:11	22:49

Team	Category	Player	Statistics
Georgia Tech	Passing	Haynes King	26/36, 303 yards, 2 TD
Georgia Tech	Rushing	Haynes King	24 carries, 110 yards, 3 TD
Georgia Tech	Receiving	Eric Singleton Jr.	8 receptions, 86 yards, 1 TD
Georgia	Passing	Carson Beck	28/43, 297 yards, 5 TD
Georgia	Rushing	Nate Frazier	11 carries, 50 yards, 1 TD
Georgia	Receiving	Cash Jones	4 receptions, 53 yards, 1 TD

=== at No. 2 Texas (SEC Championship Game) ===
The SEC Championship Game was broadcast on ABC for the first time since 2000, replacing CBS. Georgia defeated Texas 22–19 in overtime, earning an automatic bid in the 2024–25 College Football Playoff; it was the first time ever that the SEC championship game went to overtime.

After quarterback Carson Beck was injured in the first half, Gunner Stockton replaced him after halftime; Stockton threw for 71 yards and an interception.

Beck later underwent an MRI, revealing a UCL injury in his elbow. On December 23, 2024, it was announced that Beck underwent surgery on his right elbow, performed by Neal ElAttrache, prematurely ending his season. On December 28, Beck declared for the 2025 NFL draft before later withdrawing and transferring to Miami.

2024 SEC Championship Game
No. 5 Georgia Bulldogs (10–2) vs. No. 2 Texas Longhorns (11–1) – Game summary

Quarter	1	2	3	4	OT	Total
No. 5 Bulldogs	0	3	10	3	6	22
No. 2 Longhorns	3	3	0	10	3	19

at Mercedes-Benz Stadium • Atlanta, Georgia

- Date: December 7, 2024
- Game time: 4:00 p.m. EST
- Game weather: Sunny (indoors) • Temperature: 56 °F (13 °C)
- Referee: Steve Marlowe
- TV announcers (ABC/Westwood One/ESPN Radio): Chris Fowler (play-by-play), Kirk Herbstreit (analyst), Holly Rowe, and Laura Rutledge (sidelines)/Nate Gatter (play-by-play), Derek Rackley (analyst), and Alyssa Lang (sideline)/Dave Neal (play-by-play), Dave Archer (analyst), and Stephen Hartzell (sideline)

Game information

First quarter

- (5:17) TEX – Bert Auburn 41 yd Field Goal (Drive: 9 plays, 64 yards, 4:10; Texas 3–0)

Second quarter

- (10:22) TEX – Bert Auburn 42 yd Field Goal (Drive: 14 plays, 56 yards, 7:24; Texas 6–0)
- (6:41) UGA – Peyton Woodring 44 yd Field Goal (Drive: 8 plays, 49 yards, 3:50; Texas 6–3)

Third quarter

- (10:27) UGA – Trevor Etienne 10 yd Run (Peyton Woodring Kick) (Drive: 10 plays, 75 yards, 4:33; Georgia 10–6)
- (0:16) UGA – Peyton Woodring 24 yd Field Goal (Drive: 9 plays, 61 yards, 4:40; Georgia 13–6)

Fourth quarter

- (13:54) TEX – DeAndre Moore Jr. 41-yard pass from Quinn Ewers, Bert Auburn kick (Drive: 5 plays, 75 yards, 1:22; Tied 13–13)
- (4:32) UGA – Peyton Woodring 21 yd Field Goal (Drive: 16 plays, 72 yards, 9:22; Georgia 16–13)
- (0:18) TEX – Bert Auburn 37 yd Field Goal (Drive: 11 plays, 47 yards, 2:12; Tied 16–16)

Overtime

- TEX – Bert Auburn 32 yd Field Goal (Drive: 7 plays, 10 yards; Texas 19–16)
- UGA – Trevor Etienne 4 yd Run (Drive: 6 plays, 25 yards; Georgia 22–19)

Statistics	UGA	TEX
First downs	19	21
Total yards	277	389
Rushing yards	141	31
Passing yards	136	358
Passing: Comp–Att–Int	20–30–1	27–46–2
Time of possession	31:59	28:01

Team	Category	Player	Statistics
Georgia	Passing	Gunner Stockton	12/16, 71 yards, 1 INT
Georgia	Rushing	Trevor Etienne	16 carries, 94 yards, 2 TD
Georgia	Receiving	Arian Smith	5 receptions, 41 yards
Texas	Passing	Quinn Ewers	27/46, 358 yards, 1 TD, 2 INT
Texas	Rushing	Quintrevion Wisner	19 carries, 51 yards
Texas	Receiving	Matthew Golden	8 receptions, 162 yards

=== vs. No. 5 Notre Dame (2025 Sugar Bowl / College Football Playoff Quarterfinal) ===
This was the fourth meeting between the Bulldogs and the Fighting Irish, following a 2017 and 2019 home-and-home series where Georgia won both games. The two teams have previously met in the postseason just once, in the 1981 Sugar Bowl, which resulted in a 17–10 Georgia win. Though Georgia won all three previous meetings, each game was decided by seven points or less.

Quarterback Gunner Stockton (#14) started for the first time, as previous starting QB Carson Beck (#15) was recovering from surgery with plans for the NFL. Tight end Oscar Delp (#4) told the Atlanta Journal-Constitution that "we know how good of a quarterback he is. So I think we're really just excited for everyone else to finally get to see what he can do."

The game was delayed from January 1 to January 2 after a truck attack that took place in the nearby French Quarter.

The first score came on the fifth drive of the game; each team punted on their first drive, Georgia's second drive ended with a fumble at the Notre Dame 16-yard line, and Notre Dame punted for a second time before Georgia took a 3–0 lead on a 41-yard Peyton Woodring (#91) field goal. Notre Dame tied the game with a field goal of their own from Mitch Jeter (#98) on their following possession. After one additional Fighting Irish punt and two more from the Bulldogs, Notre Dame took their first lead with 39 seconds until halftime on another successful field goal by Jeter. On Georgia's next play, RJ Oben (#9) sacked Stockton as he was winding up to throw and Junior Tuihalamaka (#44) recovered for Notre Dame, leading to a touchdown pass from Riley Leonard (#13) to WR Beaux Collins (#5) and a 13–3 lead for the Fighting Irish at halftime.

Notre Dame extended its lead on the opening kickoff of the second half, which was returned 98 yards for a touchdown by Jayden Harrison (#2). Georgia punted on 4th & 3 on their next drive, and the Irish went three-and-out in response. The Bulldogs pulled within ten points on a 5-play drive that followed, ending in a 32-yard touchdown pass from Stockton to Cash Jones (#32), but they were unable to score further. They turned the ball over on downs on each of their final two offensive possessions, while Notre Dame added a 47-yard Jeter field goal in addition to a turnover on downs. Ultimately, the Irish ran out the clock to earn a semifinal berth with a 23–10 victory. Following the team's loss, Stockton opined that he "could’ve done better. Just knowing where the play clock is, and managing it is a big part of it"; linebacker Smael Mondon Jr. (#2) said, "As much as you want to, you're not going to win the national championship every single year".

2025 Sugar Bowl / College Football Playoff — Quarterfinal
No. 2 Georgia Bulldogs (11–2) vs. No. 5 Notre Dame Fighting Irish (12–1) – Game summary

Quarter	1	2	3	4	Total
No. 5 Fighting Irish	0	13	7	3	23
No. 2 Bulldogs	0	3	7	0	10

at Caesars Superdome • New Orleans, Louisiana

- Date: January 2, 2025 (Note: The Sugar Bowl was originally scheduled for January 1, but was postponed a day later due to the terrorist attack that took place early that morning in the nearby French Quarter.)
- Game time: 4:00 p.m. EST
- Game weather: Sunny (indoors) • Temperature: 59 °F (15 °C)
- Game attendance: 57,267
- Referee: Michael Vandervelde (Big 12)
- TV announcers (ESPN): Sean McDonough (play-by-play), Greg McElroy (analyst), Molly McGrath, and Laura Rutledge (sideline)

Game information
1st Quarter
- No Scoring

2nd Quarter

- (12:14) Georgia - Peyton Woodring 41-yard field goal (Drive: 5 plays, 55 yards, 2:00; Georgia 3-0)
- (8:20) Notre Dame - Mitch Jeter 44-yard field goal (Drive: 8 plays, 49 yards, 3:54; Tied 3-3)
- (0:39) Notre Dame - Mitch Jeter 48-yard field goal (Drive: 10 plays, 32 yards, 2:28; Notre Dame 6-3)
- (0:27) Notre Dame - Beaux Collins 13-yard pass from Riley Leonard (Mitch Jeter kick) (Drive: 1 play, 13 yards, 0:06; Notre Dame 13-3)

3rd Quarter

- (14:45) Notre Dame - Jayden Harrison 98-yard kickoff return (Mitch Jeter kick) (Drive: 2 plas, 16 yards, 0:27; Notre Dame 20-3)
- (9:36) Georgia - Cash Jones 32-yard pass from Gunner Stockton (Peyton Woodring kick) (Drive: 5 plays, 63 yards, 2:12; Notre Dame 20-10)

4th Quarter

- (13:47) Notre Dame - Mitch Jeter 47-yard field goal (Drive: 8 plays, 29 yards, 4:18; Notre Dame 23-10)

Statistics	ND	UGA
First downs	14	16
Third down efficiency	4–14	2–12
Fourth down efficiency	0–1	0–3
Total yards	244	296
Rushing yards	154	62
Yards per rush	4.2	2.1
Passing yards	90	234
Passing: Comp–Att–Int	15–24–0	20–32–0
Punt returns–total yards	2–11	1–6
Kickoff returns–total yards	1–98	1–19
Punts–average yardage	5–43.4	4–39.8
Fumbles–lost	0–0	3–2
Penalties–yards	10–75	5–36
Time of possession	31:47	28:13

Team	Category	Player	Statistics
Notre Dame	Passing	Riley Leonard	15/24, 90 yards, 1 TD
Notre Dame	Rushing	Riley Leonard	14 carries, 80 yards
Notre Dame	Receiving	Jordan Faison	4 receptions, 46 yards
Georgia	Passing	Gunner Stockton	20/32, 234 yards, 1 TD
Georgia	Rushing	Trevor Etienne	11 carries, 38 yards
Georgia	Receiving	Arian Smith	1 reception, 67 yards

== Personnel ==
Newcomer tight end Henry Delp (#89) is Oscar Delp's (#4) younger brother.

=== Roster ===
2024 Georgia Bulldogs football team roster
Players
Coaches
Offense

Pos.	#	Name	Class
RB	0	Roderick Robinson II	So
RB	1	Trevor Etienne	Jr
WR	2	Nitro Tuggle	Fr
RB	3	Nate Frazier	Fr
TE	4	Oscar Delp	Jr
WR	5	Anthony Evans III	So
WR	6	Dominic Lovett	Sr
TE	7	Lawson Luckie	So
WR	8	Colbie Young	Sr
QB	10	Jaden Rashada	RFr
WR	11	Arian Smith	Sr
QB	12	Ryan Puglisi	Fr
WR	13	Michael Jackson III	Sr
QB	14	Gunner Stockton	RSo
QB	15	Carson Beck	RSr
WR	16	London Humphreys	So
QB	17	Colter Ginn	Fr
WR	18	Sacovie White	Fr
RB	20	Dwight Phillips Jr.	Fr
RB	22	Branson Robinson	RSo
TE	23	Jaden Reddell	Fr
QB	26	Collin Drake	Jr
QB	27	Sam Bush	RFr
WR	28	Walter Blanchard	RFr
WR	29	Luke Bennett	RSo
RB	30	Gannon Hearst	RSo
RB	31	Wade Penn	Fr
RB	32	Cash Jones	RJr
RB	33	Chauncey Bowens	Fr
WR	35	Kavon Townsend	RJr
WR	37	Izayah Reeves	Sr
RB	38	Brandon Mathis	RSo
WR	39	Miles Thornton	RSo
TE	41	David Lalaian	RFr
WR	43	Marek Briley	RFr
TE	44	Patrick Hester	RSo
RB	45	Jacob Hardie	RSo
WR	46	Danny Curran	RSo
WR	47	Will Taylor	RFr
TE	48	Cooper Johnson	RSo
OL	51	Malachi Toliver	Fr
OL	52	Michael Uini	Fr
OL	53	Dylan Fairchild	RJr
OL	55	Jared Wilson	RJr
OL	56	Micah Morris	RJr
OL	57	Monroe Freeling	So
OL	58	Marques Easley	Fr
OL	59	Bo Hughley	RFr
OL	60	Henry Peagler	RFr
OL	61	Nic Reeves	Fr
OL	64	Jahzare Jackson	Fr
OL	69	Tate Ratledge	Sr
OL	70	Daniel Calhoun	Fr
OL	71	Earnest Greene III	RSo
OL	72	Jamal Meriweather	RFr
OL	73	Xavier Truss	RSr
OL	74	Drew Bobo	RSo
OL	75	Tate Nelms	Fr
OL	76	Marcus Harrison	Fr
OL	79	Nyier Daniels	Fr
WR	80	Brandon Moody	Jr
WR	81	Jeremy Bell	Fr
TE	82	Colton Heinrich	Fr
WR	82	Logan Johnson	Jr
WR	83	Cole Speer	Jr
TE	84	Ben Yurosek	GS
WR	86	Dillon Bell	Jr
TE	87	Jordan White	Fr
TE	89	Henry Delp	Fr

Defense }

Pos.	#	Name	Class
ILB	0	Troy Bowles	So
DB	1	Ellis Robinson IV	Fr
ILB	2	Smael Mondon Jr.	Sr
ILB	3	CJ Allen	So
DB	4	KJ Bolden	Fr
ILB	5	Raylen Wilson	So
DB	6	Daylen Everette	Jr
DB	7	Daniel Harris	So
DB	8	Joenel Aguero	So
DB	9	Justyn Rhett	RFr
OLB	10	Damon Wilson II	So
ILB	11	Jalon Walker	Jr
DB	12	Julian Humphrey	RSo
DL	13	Mykel Williams	Jr
DB	15	Demello Jones	Fr
CB	16	Maurice Hayes	Fr
DB	17	Dan Jackson	RSr
ILB	18	Chris Cole	Fr
ILB	19	Justin Williams	Fr
DB	20	JaCorey Thomas	Jr
DB	22	Jake Pope	RSo
DB	23	Ondre Evans	Fr
DB	24	Malaki Starks	Jr
DB	25	Collin Gill	RFr
OLB	26	Samuel M'Pemba	So
DB	27	Chris Peal	RFr
ILB	28	Kris Jones	Fr
OLB	29	Gabe Harris Jr.	So
ILB	30	Terrell Foster	RSo
DB	31	Kyron Jones	RFr
OLB	32	Chaz Chambliss	Sr
OLB	33	Quintavius Johnson	Fr
S	35	Jacob Fleming	RSo
DB	37	Henry Waller	RSo
CB	39	Parker Jones	RSo
DB	41	Denton Shamburger	RSo
DB	43	Ali Hall	Jr
DL	44	Jordan Hall	So
OLB	47	Sam Shurtleff	RSr
OLB	49	Luke Collins	Sr
DL	52	Christen Miller	RSo
DL	55	Jamaal Jarrett	So
DL	56	Nasir Johnson	Fr
DL	67	Clinton Barlow	RFr
DL	78	Nazir Stackhouse	Sr
DE	91	Justin Greene	Fr
DL	92	Jordan Thomas	Fr
DL	93	Tyrion Ingram-Dawkins	RJr
DL	94	Xzavier McLeod	RFr
DL	95	Nnamdi Ogboko	Fr
DL	97	Warren Brinson	Sr
DL	99	Joseph Jonah-Ajonye	Fr

Special teams

Pos.	#	Name	Class
LS	46	Luke Raab	Fr
LS	51	Will Snellings	RFr
LS	60	Beau Gardner	GS
LS	66	Jonathan Washburn	RJr
P	90	Drew Miller	Fr
K	91	Peyton Woodring	So
K	92	Liam Badger	Jr
P	92	Brett Thorson	Jr
K	94	Henry Bates	RSo
K	95	Charlie Ham	GS
P	98	Noah Jones	Jr

Head coach

- Kirby Smart

Coordinators/assistant coaches

- Mike Bobo – Offensive coordinator/quarterbacks
- Glenn Schumann – Defensive coordinator/inside linebackers
- Travaris Robinson – Co-defensive coordinator/safeties
- Kirk Benedict – Special teams coordinator
- James Coley - Wide receivers
- Josh Crawford – Running backs
- Todd Hartley – Assistant head coach/tight ends
- Tray Scott – Defensive line
- Stacy Searels – Offensive line
- Chidera Uzo-Diribe – Outside linebackers
- Donte Williams – Defensive backs

Legend

- (C) Team captain
- (S) Suspended
- (I) Ineligible
- Injured
- Redshirt

Roster
Last update: 08/07/2024

=== Coaching staff ===
Defensive assistant coach Travaris Robinson moved to Georgia this year from Alabama. Robinson told The Athletic that "some of the things that we do here are a little different from Alabama", noting that the Bulldogs were trying to make their defense "not as complex" so that "our guys are able to play faster".

Name	Position	Consecutive season at Georgia in current position
Kirby Smart	Head coach	9th
Mike Bobo	Offensive coordinator/Quarterbacks coach	2nd
Stacy Searels	Offensive line coach	3rd
Kirk Benedict	Special teams coordinator	1st
Travaris Robinson	Co-Defensive coordinator/Safeties coach	1st
Glenn Schumann	Defensive coordinator/Inside linebackers coach	6th
Chidera Uzo-Diribe	Outside linebackers coach	2nd
James Coley	Wide receivers coach	1st
Josh Crawford	Run Game coordinator/Running backs coach	1st
Todd Hartley	Tight ends coach	5th
Tray Scott	Defensive line coach	7th
Donte Williams	Defensive back coach	1st
Scott Sinclair	Strength and conditioning coach	3rd

==== Support staff ====
- Eric Black – Director of Football Creative – Football
- Mike Cavan – Director of football administration
- Austin Chambers – Assistant director of player development
- Jay Chapman – Director of Football Management
- David Cooper – Director of Recruiting Relations
- Anna Courson – Football Operations Assistant
- Chandler Eldridge – Co-director of Football Creative – Design
- Hunter Parker – Football Operations Assistant
- Bryant Gantt – Director of Player Support and operations
- Matt Godwin – Player Personnel Coordinator
- Christina Harris – Director of Recruiting Administration
- Hailey Hughes – Football Operations Coordinator
- Ann Hunt – Administrative assistant to Head Coach
- Jonas Jennings – Director of player development
- Angela Kirkpatrick – On Campus Recruiting Coordinator
- Jeremy Klawsky – Director of Football Technology
- Collier Madaleno – Director of football performance Nutrition
- John Meshad – Director of Equipment Operations
- Chad Morehead – Co-director of Football Creative Design
- Neyland Raper – Assistant director of football operations & Recruiting
- Logen Reed – Assistant recruiting coordinator
- Maurice Sims – Associate director of strength and conditioning
- Juwan Taylor – Player Development Assistant
- Meaghan Turcotte – Assistant director of football performance Nutrition
- Tersoo Uhaa – Assistant Strength and Conditioning Coach
- Gage Whitten – Director of Football Equipment and Apparel

==== Graduate assistants ====
- Garrett Murphy – Defensive assistant
- Adam Ray – Special teams Assistant
- Jacob Russell – Offensive assistant
- Rashawn Scott – Offensive assistant

==== Analysts ====
- Davis Merritt
- Montgomery VanGorder
- Brandon Streeter
- Will Muschamp
- Andrew Thacker

== Rankings ==
Ranking movements Legend: ██ Increase in ranking ██ Decrease in ranking ( ) = First-place votes
	Week																
Poll	Pre	1	2	3	4	5	6	7	8	9	10	11	12	13	14	15	Final
AP	1 (46)	1 (57)	1 (54)	2 (23)	2 (13)	5	5	5	2 (2)	2 (1)	2	11	8	6	5	2	6
Coaches	1 (46)	1 (51)	1 (50)	1 (42)	1 (35)	5	4	4	2 (2)	2 (1)	2	10	8	6	5	2	6
CFP	Not released										3	12	10	7	5	2	Not released
