= Carson Beck =

American football player (born 2001)

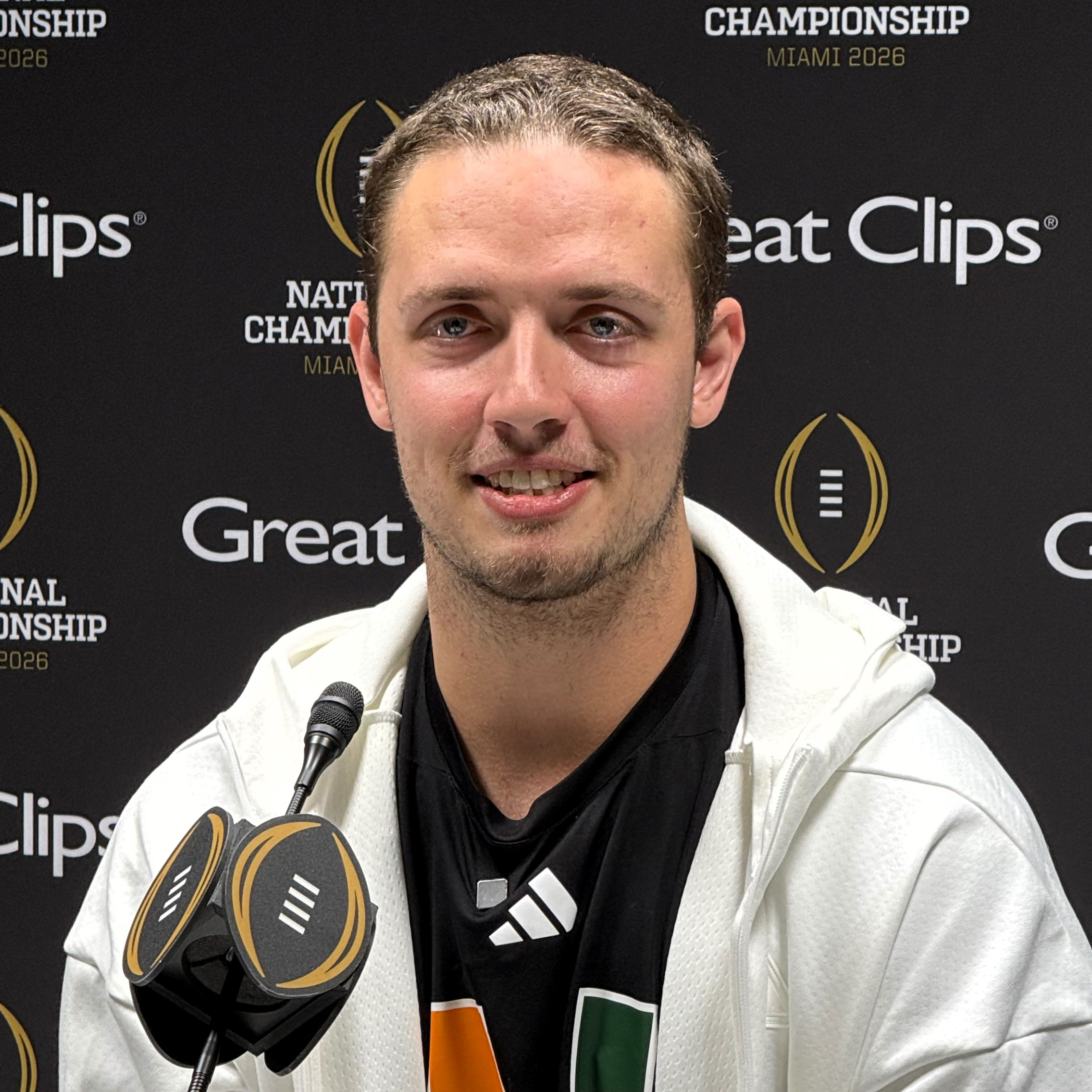
- Beck in 2026

No. 19 – Arizona Cardinals
- Position: Quarterback
- Roster status: Active

Personal information
- Born: November 19, 2001 (age 24); Jacksonville, Florida, U.S.
- Listed height: 6 ft 5 in (1.96 m)
- Listed weight: 233 lb (106 kg)

Career information
- High school: Mandarin (Jacksonville)
- College: Georgia (2020–2024) Miami (FL) (2025)
- NFL draft: 2026: 3rd round, 65th overall pick

Career history
- Arizona Cardinals (2026–present)

Awards and highlights
- 2× CFP national champion (2021, 2022); Second-team All-SEC (2023); Third-team All-ACC (2025)

Career NFL statistics as of Week 10, 2026
- Passing attempts: 18
- Passing completions: 11
- Completion percentage: 61.1%
- TD–INT: 0–2
- Passing yards: 108
- Passer rating: 38.4
- Stats at Pro Football Reference

Carson Raine Beck (born November 19, 2001) is an American professional football quarterback for the Arizona Cardinals of the National Football League (NFL). He played college football for the Georgia Bulldogs, where he was part of two national championships as a backup in 2021 and 2022, before transferring to the Miami Hurricanes, where he led the team to the 2026 College Football Playoff National Championship game. Beck was selected by the Cardinals in the third round of the 2026 NFL draft.

== Early life ==
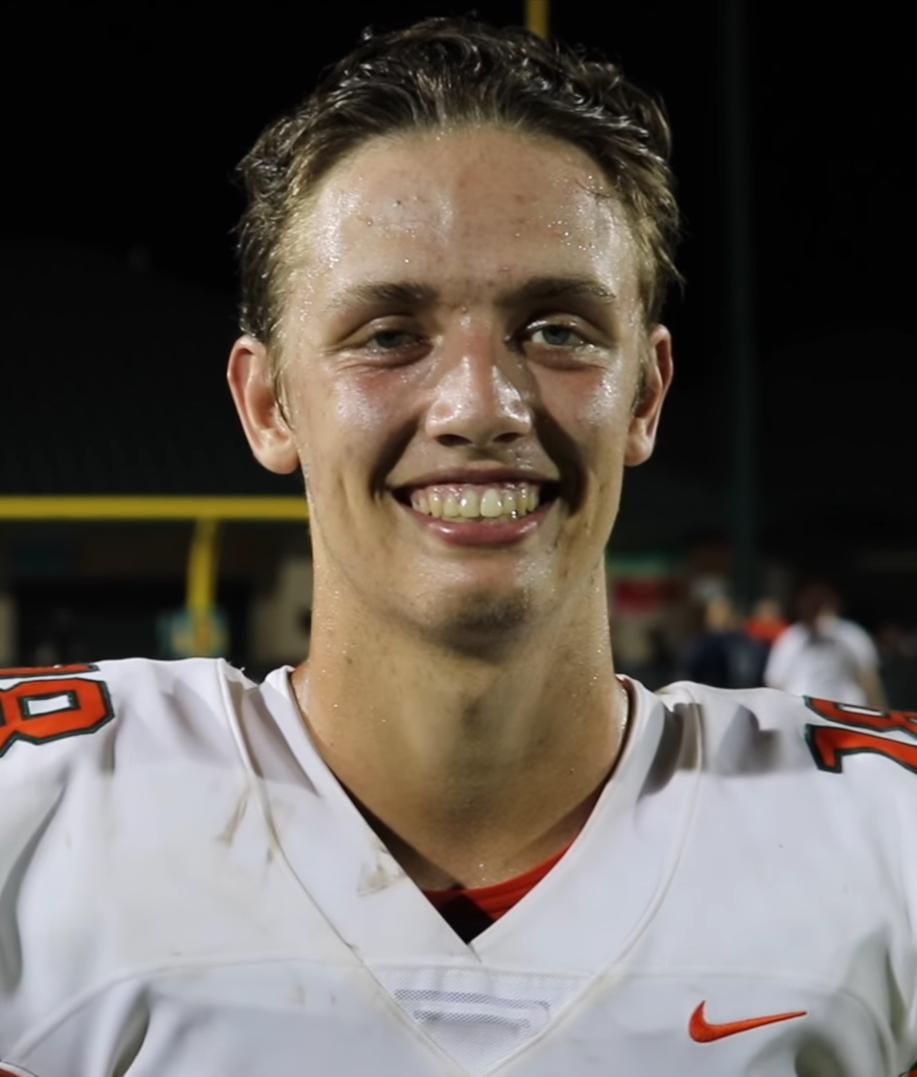
Beck with Mandarin High School in 2018.

Beck was born on November 19, 2001, in Jacksonville, Florida. He attended Mandarin High School and was named the 2018 Florida Mr. Football after throwing for 3,546 yards and 30 touchdowns as a junior. Beck led Mandarin to a Florida State Championship, throwing for five touchdowns in the championship game. As a senior, he recorded 1,843 yards and 20 touchdowns on 136 completions. As a sophomore he committed to play baseball at Florida, before deciding to focus on football, committing to Alabama for the sport. Beck would ultimately decommit from Alabama and commit to play college football at the University of Georgia.

== College career ==
=== Georgia ===
==== 2020–2022 ====
As a freshman, Beck entered the season as the backup in a quarterback room including Stetson Bennett, JT Daniels, and D'Wan Mathis. Beck made his first appearance against Missouri in the fourth quarter. The following season, Beck threw his first career touchdown pass in a 56–7 victory over UAB. In 2021, Beck played in three games, throwing for 176 yards, two touchdowns, and two interceptions. Beck entered the 2022 season as the second-string quarterback, serving as the backup for Bennett. He appeared in the first three games of the season totaling 178 yards and two touchdowns. Against Vanderbilt, Beck tallied two touchdowns and 98 yards.

==== 2023 ====
Entering the 2023 season, Beck was named the week one starter against UT Martin. In his first game as a starter, he threw for 294 yards and a touchdown, adding another touchdown rushing in a 48–7 victory. The following week, Beck tallied 283 yards and two touchdowns in a 45–3 win over Ball State. In his first career SEC start, he threw for 269 yards leading Georgia to a 24–14 comeback victory against South Carolina. The next week against UAB, Beck threw for a then career-high 337 yards and combined for four total touchdowns, three passing and one rushing, in a 49–21 triumph. Against Auburn the following week, Beck made his first career road start, throwing for 313 yards and the go-ahead touchdown, a 40-yard pass to Brock Bowers, leading Georgia to a 27–20 win. In his first career start against a ranked opponent, he threw for 389 yards and four touchdowns in a 51–13 rout of No. 20 Kentucky. As a result of his performance, he was named the co-SEC offensive player of the week. Against Florida, Beck threw for 315 yards and two touchdowns in a 43–20 win. Against No. 12 Missouri the following week, Beck recorded 21 completions for 254 yards and two touchdowns, resulting in a 30–21 victory.

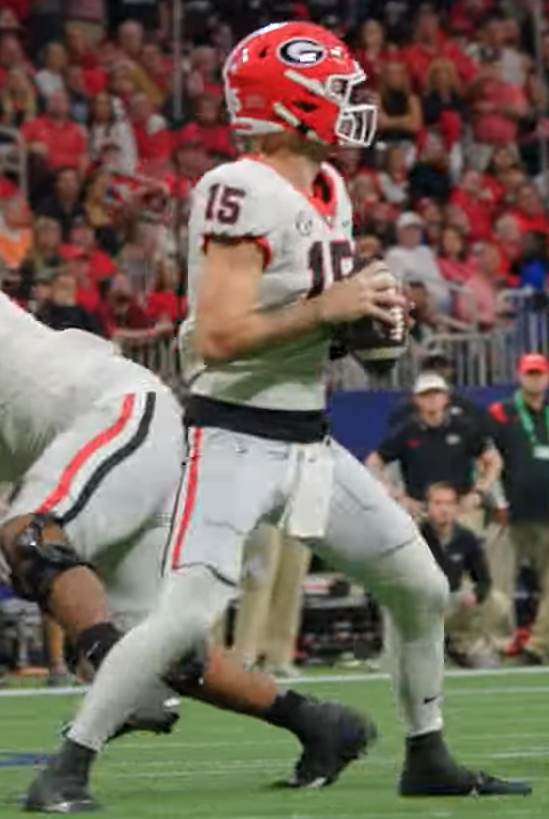
Beck with Georgia in the 2023 SEC Championship Game

During the 2023 regular season, Beck led Georgia to a 12–1 record, finishing the year with 22 passing touchdowns and 3,738 passing yards. In the 2023 Orange Bowl, he threw for 203 yards and two touchdowns, helping lead Georgia to the largest margin of victory in any bowl game at the FBS level with a 63–3 thrashing of Florida State. Following the conclusion of the season, Beck announced that he would return the following season rather than enter the 2024 NFL draft. Beck finished the 2023 season throwing for 3,941 yards and recording 28 total touchdowns.

==== 2024 ====
Entering the 2024 season, Beck emerged as one of the top overall prospects in the upcoming 2025 NFL draft. In the season opener against No. 14 Clemson, he threw for 278 yards and two touchdowns in a 34–3 victory. For his performance, he was named the co-SEC offensive player of the week. The following week, he threw a program record-tying five touchdown passes against Tennessee Tech. Against No. 4 Alabama, Beck threw for 439 yards and three touchdowns, while also throwing three interceptions, in a 41–34 defeat. Against Mississippi State, Beck threw for a career-high 459 yards and three touchdowns in a 41–31 victory. Against No. 7 Tennessee, he threw for 347 yards and two touchdowns, in addition to rushing for 32 yards and a touchdown in a 31–17 win. Against Georgia Tech in Beck's final Clean, Old-Fashioned Hate game, he threw for 297 yards and five touchdowns, leading Georgia to a 44–42 comeback victory in eight overtimes from when they were down 27-13. In the 2024 SEC Championship Game against No. 2 Texas, he sustained a shoulder injury on the final play of the first half, being ruled out for the rest of the game. Georgia went on to win the game by a score of 22–19 in overtime, in the absence of Beck. After the game, he underwent an MRI, revealing a UCL injury in his elbow. After not being able to practice with the team, Beck was ruled out for Georgia's College Football Playoff game in the 2025 Sugar Bowl. On December 23, 2024, it was announced that Beck underwent surgery on his right elbow, performed by Neal ElAttrache, prematurely ending his season. On December 28, he declared for the 2025 NFL draft. However, on January 9, 2025, Beck instead opted to enter the transfer portal rather than enter the draft.

During the 2024 regular season, Beck led Georgia to a 11–2 record, including an SEC Championship. He finished the season passing for 3,485 yards and 28 touchdowns with 12 interceptions. While at Georgia, Beck started in 27 games, accumulating a 24–3 record while throwing for 7,912 yards and 58 touchdowns with 20 interceptions.

=== Miami ===
On January 10, 2025, Beck announced his decision to transfer to the University of Miami to play for the Miami Hurricanes. In his Miami debut against No. 6 Notre Dame, he threw for 205 yards and two touchdowns in a 27–24 victory. Against rival Florida State, Beck completed 20 of 27 passes for 241 yards and four touchdowns in a 28–22 win. In the following game against Louisville, he threw a career-high four interceptions in the 24–21 defeat. Against Virginia Tech, Beck threw for 320 yards and four touchdowns in a 34–17 victory.

Under Beck as the starting quarterback, the Hurricanes earned a berth in the College Football Playoff as the No. 10 seed. On the road at No. 7 Texas A&M in the first round, he threw for 103 yards and the game-winning touchdown to Malachi Toney, leading the Hurricanes to a 10–3 victory. Against No. 2 Ohio State in the 2025 Cotton Bowl, Beck completed 19 passes for 138 yards and a touchdown as Miami knocked off the Buckeyes, 24–14. In the 2026 Fiesta Bowl versus Ole Miss, he threw for 268 yards, two touchdowns, and an interception, in addition to rushing for the game-winning touchdown, propelling the Hurricanes to a 31–27 triumph and being named the game’s offensive MVP. In the 2026 College Football Playoff National Championship against Indiana, his final collegiate game, Beck threw a late interception to Jamari Sharpe on Miami’s final possession while trailing by six points in a 27–21 loss. He finished the game totaling 232 passing yards, a touchdown, and an interception. Beck finished the season with 3,813 passing yards, a career-high 30 touchdowns, and 12 interceptions, completing 72.4 percent of his passes, and was named third-team All-ACC.

=== Statistics ===
Year	Team	Games			Passing								Rushing			
Year	Team	GP	GS	Record	Cmp	Att	Pct	Yds	Y/A	TD	Int	Rtg	Att	Yds	Avg	TD
2020	Georgia	1	0	—	Redshirted (redshirt)											
2021	Georgia	4	0	—	10	23	43.5	176	7.7	2	2	119.1	5	15	3.0	0
2022	Georgia	7	0	—	26	35	74.3	310	8.9	4	0	186.4	7	43	6.1	0
2023	Georgia	14	14	13–1	302	417	72.4	3,941	9.5	24	6	167.9	60	116	1.9	4
2024	Georgia	13	13	11–2	290	448	64.7	3,485	7.8	28	12	145.3	55	71	1.3	1
2025	Miami	16	16	13–3	338	467	72.4	3,813	8.2	30	12	157.0	62	43	0.7	2
Career		55	43	37−6	966	1,390	69.5	11,725	8.4	88	32	156.6	189	288	1.5	7

== Professional career ==
Pre-draft measurables
Height	Weight	Arm length	Hand span	Wingspan
6 ft 4 3/4 in (1.95 m)	233 lb (106 kg)	30 5/8 in (0.78 m)	10 in (0.25 m)	6 ft 3 in (1.91 m)
All values from NFL Combine

Beck was selected by the Arizona Cardinals with the 65th overall pick in the third round of the 2026 NFL draft. On July 22, he signed a four-year, $7.4 million contract. After Gardner Minshew tore his UCL, requiring season-ending right elbow surgery, he was named the starter for Week 10 vs the Rams. During his first regular season start, Beck completed 11 out of 18 passes for 108 yards and two interceptions. Limited to only 142 total yards of offense, the Cardinals lost 6–34.

== Personal life ==
Between 2024 and 2025, Beck was in a relationship with Miami Hurricanes basketball player and social media influencer Hanna Cavinder. On February 20, 2025, Beck and Cavinder's luxury cars were stolen as part of a home burglary.

In 2024, Beck purchased a Lamborghini Urus Performante, which brought widespread attention to him and the state of collegiate athletics following the implementation of name, image, and likeness (NIL).
