= Colbie Young =

American football player (born 2002)

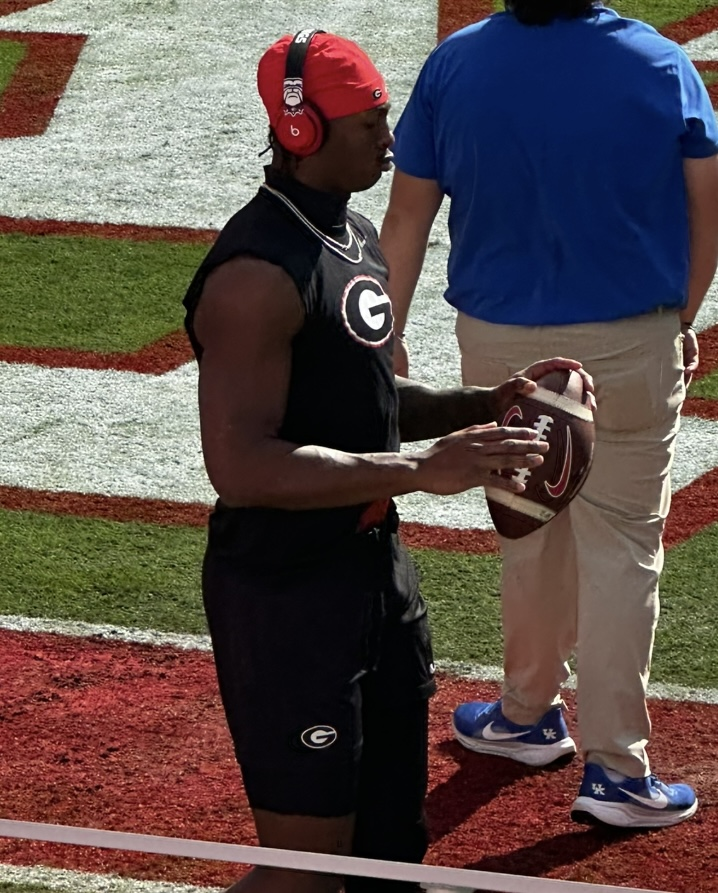
- Young in 2025

No. 86 – Cincinnati Bengals
- Position: Wide receiver
- Roster status: Active

Personal information
- Born: July 24, 2002 (age 24); Binghamton, New York, U.S.
- Listed height: 6 ft 5 in (1.96 m)
- Listed weight: 218 lb (99 kg)

Career information
- High school: Binghamton
- College: Lackawanna College (2021); Miami (FL) (2022–2023); Georgia (2024–2025)
- NFL draft: 2026: 4th round, 140th overall pick

Career history
- Cincinnati Bengals (2026–present)

Career NFL statistics as of Week 4, 2026
- Receptions: 2
- Receiving yards: 9
- Stats at Pro Football Reference

Colbie Maleek Young (born July 24, 2002) is an American professional football wide receiver for the Cincinnati Bengals of the National Football League (NFL). He played college football for the Lackawanna Falcons, Miami Hurricanes, and Georgia Bulldogs. Young was selected by the Bengals in the fourth round of the 2026 NFL draft.

== Early life ==
Young grew up in Binghamton, New York, and attended Binghamton High School, where he played basketball and football. He was named first-team Class AA all-state as a senior after scoring 14 touchdowns in eight games played.

== College career ==
Young began his collegiate career at Lackawanna College. As a freshman, he caught 24 passes for 472 yards and nine touchdowns. After his freshman year, Young transferred to Miami over offers from Florida State, Tennessee, Penn State, Virginia Tech, and Pittsburgh.

Young became a starter at wide receiver for the Miami Hurricanes midway through his first season with the team. He finished the season with 22 receptions for 367 yards and led the team with five touchdown receptions.

On December 9, 2023, Young announced that he would be entering the transfer portal. On December 23, Young decided to transfer to the University of Georgia for his then-final year of eligibility.

On October 9, 2024, Young was suspended from the program by coach Kirby Smart for the rest of the season after he was arrested and charged for battery and assault of an unborn child.

On March 11, 2025, Smart announced that Young would be reinstated to the Georgia Bulldogs football team following the resolution of the resolution of his legal issues as well as the Pavia v. NCAA decision granting athletes waivers for their time at NJCAA schools.

== Professional career ==
Pre-draft measurables
Height	Weight	Arm length	Hand span	Wingspan	40-yard dash	10-yard split	20-yard split	Vertical jump	Bench press
6 ft 4 3/4 in (1.95 m)	218 lb (99 kg)	31 7/8 in (0.81 m)	9 1/2 in (0.24 m)	6 ft 4 7/8 in (1.95 m)	4.49 s	1.59 s	2.65 s	33.0 in (0.84 m)	18 reps
All values from NFL Combine/Pro Day

Young was selected by the Cincinnati Bengals in the fourth round with the 140th overall pick of the 2026 NFL draft. He signed his rookie contract on May 8.

== Career statistics ==
College statistics
Year	Team	GP	Receiving			
Year	Team	GP	Rec	Yds	Avg	TD
2021	Lackawanna	9	24	472	19.7	9
2022	Miami (FL)	10	32	367	11.5	5
2023	Miami (FL)	12	47	563	12.0	5
2024	Georgia	5	11	149	13.5	2
2025	Georgia	7	23	336	14.6	1
NJCAA career		9	24	472	19.7	9
NCAA career		34	113	1,424	12.6	13

== Personal life ==
On the morning of October 8, 2024, Young was arrested and charged with battery and assault of an unborn child after he was found to have injured his pregnant ex-girlfriend when she visited him. He was released that afternoon after posting bail, which had been set at $2,500. On October 9, 2024, Georgia coach Kirby Smart announced that Young would be suspended "until this legal matter is resolved." On January 29, 2025, Young accepted a plea deal and was sentenced to 12 months of probation.
