= Leroy Harris III =

American football player

No. 33 – Kansas Jayhawks
- Position: Defensive end
- Class: Junior

Personal information
- Listed height: 6 ft 5 in (1.96 m)
- Listed weight: 260 lb (118 kg)

Career information
- High school: Christ Presbyterian Academy (Nashville, Tennessee)
- College: Chattanooga (2024); Kansas (2025–present)
- Stats at ESPN

Leroy Harris III is an American football defensive end for the Kansas Jayhawks. He previously played for the Chattanooga Mocs.

== Early life ==
Harris III attended Christ Presbyterian Academy in Nashville, Tennessee, and committed to play college football for the Chattanooga Mocs.

== College career ==
As a freshman in 2024, Harris III played in all 12 games for Chattanooga, notching 11 tackles with half a tackle being for a loss, three fumble recoveries, and a touchdown, earning FCS All-American honors. After the conclusion of the season, he entered the NCAA transfer portal.

Harris III transferred to play for the Kansas Jayhawks. In 2025, he totaled 31 tackles with six and a half being for a loss, four and a half sacks, and eight pass deflections.

== Personal life ==
Harris is the son of former NC State and NFL player, Leroy Harris Jr.
