= Leroy Harris (offensive lineman) =

American football player (born 1984)

No. 64
- Position: Guard / Center

Personal information
- Born: June 6, 1984 (age 42); Raleigh, North Carolina, U.S.
- Listed height: 6 ft 3 in (1.91 m)
- Listed weight: 303 lb (137 kg)

Career information
- High school: Southeast Raleigh
- College: NC State
- NFL draft: 2007: 4th round, 115th overall pick

Career history
- Tennessee Titans (2007–2012); Detroit Lions (2013)

Awards and highlights
- Second-team All-ACC (2006)

Career NFL statistics
- Games played: 76
- Games started: 42
- Stats at Pro Football Reference

Leroy Harris Jr. (born June 6, 1984) is an American former professional football player who was an offensive guard in the National Football League (NFL). He played college football for the NC State Wolfpack and was selected by the Tennessee Titans in the fourth round (115th overall) of the 2007 NFL draft. He started three games prior to the 2010 NFL season. In 2010, he took over at guard for Eugene Amano who replaced Kevin Mawae. Harris works at the Ensworth School in Nashville, TN as defensive line coach.

== Personal life ==
Harris's son, Leroy Harris III is a college football defensive end for the Kansas Jayhawks.
