= Christ Presbyterian Academy =

Location
- Nashville, Tennessee; United States; 36°03′01″N 86°52′42″W

Information
- Type: Private
- Motto: "Soli Deo Gloria"
- Religious affiliation: Presbyterian (PCA)
- Established: 1985
- Head of School: Nate Morrow
- Enrollment: 1,300
- Colors: Purple and gold
- Athletics conference: TSSAA - Division I
- Mascot: Lions
- Accreditations: SAIS/AdvancED, SACS, ISNA
- Website: www.cpalions.org

Christ Presbyterian Academy (CPA) is a private, coeducational, college-preparatory school for grades preschool through 12 in Nashville, Tennessee, United States. The school provides education through a Christian worldview. CPA is affiliated with Christ Presbyterian Church, a congregation of the Presbyterian Church in America.

== About ==
Christ Presbyterian Academy was established for Christian education in 1985 as a ministry of Christ Presbyterian Church for the education of the covenant children of Christ Presbyterian Church and, space permitting, those of other believers who would desire to educate them at the academy. It began with a faculty and staff of 11 and with 124 children in grades K-6. The academy doubled in size the next year, and has experienced continued growth, adding grades and classes to develop a comprehensive preschool-12 program. Current enrollment is just over 1,200, with a faculty and staff of over 200.

== Notable alumni ==
- Caleb Chapman, lead vocalist and guitarist for Colony House
- Will Chapman, drummer for Colony House
- Leroy Harris III, college football defensive end for the Kansas Jayhawks
- Ellie Holcomb, singer/songwriter
- London Humphreys, wide receiver for the Georgia Bulldogs
- Braxton Key, professional basketball player for the Denver Nuggets, attended CPA for grades 8-11 before transferring to basketball prep school Oak Hill Academy for his senior year
- Amanda Sudano Ramirez, singer/songwriter, half of musical duo Johnnyswim
