= Dominic Lovett =

American football player (born 2002)

No. 19 – Detroit Lions
- Position: Wide receiver
- Roster status: Practice squad

Personal information
- Born: November 8, 2002 (age 23); St. Louis, Missouri, U.S.
- Listed height: 5 ft 10 in (1.78 m)
- Listed weight: 185 lb (84 kg)

Career information
- High school: East St. Louis Senior (East St. Louis, Illinois)
- College: Missouri (2021–2022); Georgia (2023–2024)
- NFL draft: 2025: 7th round, 244th overall pick

Career history
- Detroit Lions (2025–present)

Awards and highlights
- First-team All-SEC (2022)
- Stats at Pro Football Reference

Dominic Zion Lovett (born November 8, 2002) is an American professional football wide receiver for the Detroit Lions of the National Football League (NFL). He played college football for the Missouri Tigers and Georgia Bulldogs. Lovett was selected by the Lions in the seventh round of the 2025 NFL draft being the first wide receiver the Lions have selected out of Georgia.

== Early life ==
Lovett grew up in Venice, Illinois, and attended East St. Louis Senior High School. He was rated a four-star recruit and initially committed to play college football at Arizona State over offers from 20 other Power Five schools. Lovett flipped his commitment to Missouri later in his senior year.

== College career ==
=== Missouri ===
Lovett caught 26 passes for 173 yards and also rushed for 40 yards and one touchdown during his freshman season at the University of Missouri. He entered his sophomore season as a starter at wide receiver. Lovett was named first team All-Southeastern Conference (SEC) by the Associated Press at the end of the season after leading the Tigers with 56 receptions and 846 receiving yards with three touchdown receptions. He entered the NCAA transfer portal after the conclusion of the regular season.

=== Georgia ===
In December 2022, Lovett transferred to the University of Georgia.

In 2023, Lovett started in 7 games for the Bulldogs and caught 54 passes for 613 yards and four touchdowns.

In 2024, Lovett would start in 7 of 14 games and catch 59 passes for 607 yards and six touchdowns.

== Professional career ==
Pre-draft measurables
Height	Weight	Arm length	Hand span	Wingspan	40-yard dash	10-yard split	20-yard split	Vertical jump	Broad jump
5 ft 10 in (1.78 m)	185 lb (84 kg)	31 3/8 in (0.80 m)	9 1/4 in (0.23 m)	6 ft 3 5/8 in (1.92 m)	4.40 s	1.53 s	2.57 s	33.5 in (0.85 m)	10 ft 0 in (3.05 m)
All values from NFL Combine

Lovett was drafted by the Detroit Lions with the 244th overall pick in the seventh round of the 2025 NFL draft. On August 30, 2026, Lovett was waived by the Lions as a part of final roster cuts. On September 1, Detroit re–signed Lovett to their practice squad.

== Career statistics ==
=== NFL ===
NFL statistics
Year	Team	GP	Kickoff returns			
Year	Team	GP	KRet	Yds	TD	Lng
2025	DET	12	1	22	0	22

=== College ===
College statistics
Season	Team	Games		Receiving				Rushing			
Season	Team	GP	GS	Rec	Yards	Avg	TD	Att	Yards	Avg	TD
2021	Missouri	13	6	26	173	6.7	0	4	40	10.0	1
2022	Missouri	12	6	56	846	15.1	3	7	6	0.9	0
2023	Georgia	14	7	54	613	11.4	4	0	0	0.0	0
2024	Georgia	13	0	56	571	10.2	6	0	0	0.0	0
Career		41	19	142	1,698	11.9	13	11	46	4.2	1
