= London Humphreys =

American football player (born 2005)

No. 16 – Georgia Bulldogs
- Position: Wide receiver
- Class: Senior

Personal information
- Born: May 13, 2005 (age 21)
- Listed height: 6 ft 2 in (1.88 m)
- Listed weight: 200 lb (91 kg)

Career information
- High school: Christ Presbyterian Academy (Nashville, Tennessee)
- College: Vanderbilt (2023); Georgia (2024–present)

Awards and highlights
- First-team All-SEC Freshman (2023)
- Stats at ESPN

London Humphreys (born May 13, 2005) is an American college football wide receiver for the Georgia Bulldogs of the Southeastern Conference (SEC). He previously played for the Vanderbilt Commodores.

== Early life ==
Humphreys attended Christ Presbyterian Academy in Nashville, Tennessee. While in high school, Humphreys ran track in addition to playing baseball and basketball. It wasn't until his junior year of high school that Humphreys played his first season of varsity high school football, where he recorded 45 receptions for 1,100 yards and 12 touchdowns. As a senior, he tallied 60 receptions for 1,099 yards and 15 touchdowns. A three-star recruit, he committed to play college football at Vanderbilt University over offers from Memphis, Middle Tennessee State, and Minnesota.

== College career ==
=== Vanderbilt ===
Humphreys received immediate playing time in his freshman year, recording his first career touchdown in the first game of his collegiate career. Against Wake Forest, he totaled four receptions for 109 yards and a touchdown, and as a result, he was named the SEC Freshman of the Week. Humphreys finished the season with 439 receiving yards and four touchdowns. On December 4, 2023, Humphreys announced that he would enter the transfer portal.

=== Georgia ===
On December 19, 2023, Humphreys announced that he would be transferring to the University of Georgia, to play for the Georgia Bulldogs.

| Season | Team | GP | Receiving | | | |
| Season | Team | GP | Rec | Yds | Avg | TD |
|---|---|---|---|---|---|---|
| 2023 | Vanderbilt | 12 | 22 | 439 | 20.0 | 4 |
| 2024 | Georgia | 13 | 15 | 244 | 16.3 | 2 |
| 2025 | Georgia | 14 | 18 | 276 | 15.3 | 3 |
| 2026 | Georgia | 6 | 10 | 85 | 8.5 | 2 |
| Career | | 45 | 65 | 1,044 | 16.1 | 11 |
