= Oscar Delp =

American football player (born 2003)

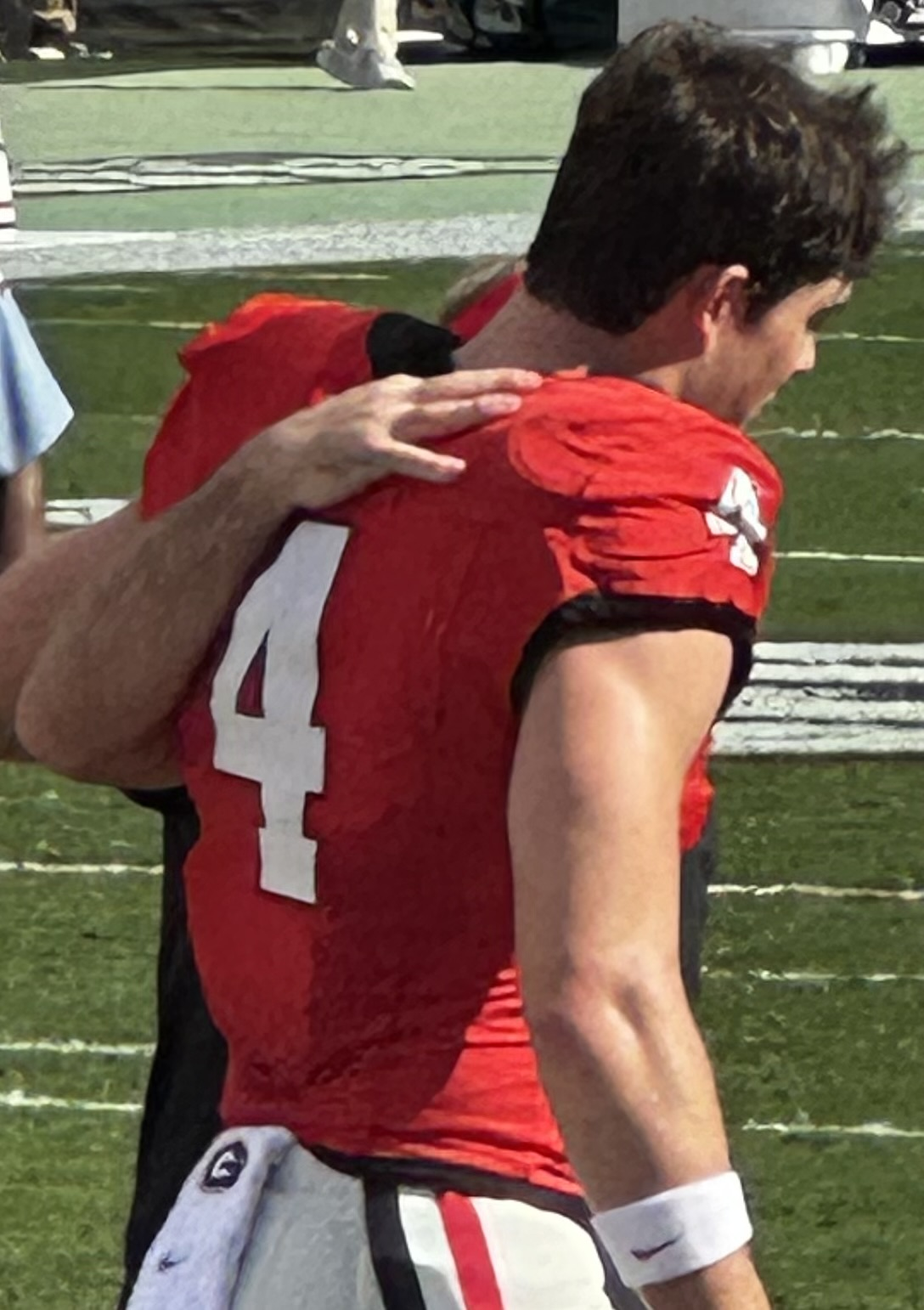
- Delp in 2025

No. 4 – New Orleans Saints
- Position: Tight end
- Roster status: Active

Personal information
- Born: August 4, 2003 (age 23); Atlanta, Georgia, U.S.
- Listed height: 6 ft 5 in (1.96 m)
- Listed weight: 245 lb (111 kg)

Career information
- High school: West Forsyth (Cumming, Georgia)
- College: Georgia (2022–2025)
- NFL draft: 2026: 3rd round, 73rd overall pick

Career history
- New Orleans Saints (2026–present)

Awards and highlights
- CFP national champion (2022)

Career NFL statistics as of Week 7, 2026
- Receptions: 4
- Receiving yards: 20
- Stats at Pro Football Reference

Oscar Travis Delp (born August 4, 2003) is an American professional football tight end for the New Orleans Saints of the National Football League (NFL). He played college football for the Georgia Bulldogs and was selected by the Saints in the third round of the 2026 NFL draft.

== Early life ==
Delp was born on August 4, 2003 in Atlanta, Georgia and was raised in Cumming, Georgia. Delp attended West Forsyth High School in Cumming. As a junior, he caught 43 passes for 730 yards and nine touchdowns. Delp had 59 receptions for 923 yards and eight touchdowns in his senior season and was selected to play in the 2022 All-American Bowl. Delp was rated a four-star recruit and committed to play college football at Georgia over offers from South Carolina, Michigan, and Clemson where his cousin played Football. Delp also played lacrosse at West Forsyth.

== College career ==
Delp joined the Georgia Bulldogs as an early enrollee in January 2022. He participated in spring practices and led all receivers in Georgia's annual spring game with seven receptions and 91 receiving yards. Delp entered his freshman season as the team's fourth tight end. He saw his first significant playing time in the Bulldogs' third game of the season against South Carolina and caught two passes for 32 yards and one touchdown in a 48–7 win. He finished the 2022 season with five receptions for 61 yards and a touchdown. He finished the 2023 season with 24 receptions for 284 yards and three touchdowns.

=== Statistics ===
| Year | Team | GP | Receiving | | | |
| Year | Team | GP | Rec | Yds | Avg | TD |
|---|---|---|---|---|---|---|
| 2022 | Georgia | 13 | 5 | 61 | 12.2 | 1 |
| 2023 | Georgia | 14 | 24 | 284 | 11.8 | 3 |
| 2024 | Georgia | 14 | 21 | 248 | 11.8 | 4 |
| 2025 | Georgia | 14 | 20 | 261 | 13.1 | 1 |
| Career | | 55 | 70 | 854 | 12.2 | 9 |

== Professional career ==
Pre-draft measurables
| Height | Weight | Arm length | Hand span | Wingspan | 40-yard dash | 10-yard split | 20-yard split | Vertical jump | Broad jump | Bench press |
|---|---|---|---|---|---|---|---|---|---|---|
| 6 ft 4 7/8 in (1.95 m) | 245 lb (111 kg) | 31 5/8 in (0.80 m) | 9 1/2 in (0.24 m) | 6 ft 5 3/8 in (1.97 m) | 4.49 s | 1.61 s | 2.59 s | 38.0 in (0.97 m) | 10 ft 5 in (3.18 m) | 23 reps |
All values from NFL Combine/Pro Day

Delp was selected by the New Orleans Saints in the third round with the 73rd overall pick in the 2026 NFL draft.
