= Neal ElAttrache =

American orthopedic surgeon

- Born: 1959 (age 66–67)
- Education: University of Notre Dame; University of Pittsburgh
- Occupation: Orthopedic surgeon

Neal S. Elattrache (born 1959) is an American orthopedic surgeon who operates on sportspeople and celebrities, specializing at the Cedars-Sinai Kerlan-Jobe Orthopaedic Clinic in Los Angeles, California.

ElAttrache graduated from the University of Notre Dame in 1981 and completed a medical degree in 1985 from the University of Pittsburgh. He works across multiple subfields, and is considered among the best by fellow surgeons. ElAttrache usually practices at a building near Los Angeles International Airport.

He has also treated billionaires, royalty, and many athlete injuries.

He is also the team physician for the Los Angeles Rams and Los Angeles Dodgers. He also is the orthopedic consultant for the Los Angeles Kings and the Anaheim Ducks.

== Personal life ==
ElAttrache was raised in Mount Pleasant, Pennsylvania by his parents, Selim and Vera ElAttrache; Selim, a Druze Syrian, was also a surgeon. He was an amateur boxer in college, where he won the light-heavyweight boxing championship. ElAttrache underwent a fellowship with sports surgeons Robert Kerlan and Frank Jobe, and was also mentored by James Andrews.

Many of ElAttrache's patients consider him a close friend.

ElAttrache lives near Benedict Canyon with his wife Tricia (née Flavin); he is brothers-in-law with Sylvester Stallone, who is married to Jennifer Flavin.
