= 2024 SEC Championship Game =

- Conference Championship
Georgia Bulldogs	Texas Longhorns
(10–2)	(11–1)
22	19
Head coach: Kirby Smart	Head coach: Steve Sarkisian
AP / Coaches / CFP; 5 / 5 / 5	AP / Coaches / CFP; 2 / 2 / 2
	1	2	3	4	OT	Total
Georgia	0	3	10	3	6	22
Texas	3	3	0	10	3	19
- Date: December 7, 2024
- Season: 2024
- Stadium: Mercedes-Benz Stadium
- Location: Atlanta, Georgia
- MVP: Daylen Everette
- Favorite: Texas by 3
- Referee: Steve Marlowe
- Attendance: 74,916

United States TV coverage
- Network: ABC (ESPN+); Westwood One; SEC Radio
- Announcers: ABC: Chris Fowler (play-by-play), Kirk Herbstreit (analyst), Holly Rowe and Laura Rutledge (sidelines); Westwood One: Nate Gatter (play-by-play), Derek Rackley (analyst), and Alyssa Lang (sideline); SEC Radio: Dave Neal (play-by-play), Dave Archer (analyst), and Stephen Hartzell (sideline)

2024 Southeastern Conference football standings
	Conf.			Overall
Team	W		L	W		L
No. 4 Texas y^	7	–	1	13	–	3
No. 6 Georgia y$^	6	–	2	11	–	3
No. 9 Tennessee ^	6	–	2	10	–	3
No. 11 Ole Miss	5	–	3	10	–	3
No. 17 Alabama	5	–	3	9	–	4
No. 19 South Carolina	5	–	3	9	–	4
No. 22 Missouri	5	–	3	10	–	3
Texas A&M	5	–	3	8	–	5
LSU	5	–	3	9	–	4
Florida	4	–	4	8	–	5
Arkansas	3	–	5	7	–	6
Vanderbilt	3	–	5	7	–	6
Oklahoma	2	–	6	6	–	7
Auburn	2	–	6	5	–	7
Kentucky	1	–	7	4	–	8
Mississippi State	0	–	8	2	–	10
Championship: Georgia 22, Texas 19 ^{OT}
^ – College Football Playoff participant; $ – Conference champion; y – Championship game participant; Rankings from AP Poll

The 2024 SEC Championship Game was a college football game played on December 7, 2024, at Mercedes-Benz Stadium in Atlanta. It was the 33rd SEC Championship Game and determined the champion of the 2025 season. The game featured the Texas Longhorns, the No. 1 seed, and the Georgia Bulldogs, the No. 2 seed. The game began at 4:00 p.m. EST and was broadcast on ABC for the first time since 2000, replacing CBS. Georgia defeated Texas 22–19 in overtime, earning an automatic bid in the 2024–25 College Football Playoff; it was the first time ever that the SEC championship Game has gone to overtime.

== Teams ==
Georgia previously defeated Texas in the regular season on October 19 by a score of 30–15.

=== Georgia Bulldogs ===
The Georgia Bulldogs entered the SEC Championship Game as the No. 2 seed after a 44–42 victory over Georgia Tech in eight overtimes. It was their fourth consecutive SEC Championship Game appearance and their 12th overall.

=== Texas Longhorns ===
The Texas Longhorns entered the SEC Championship Game as the No. 1 seed after a 17–7 victory over the Texas A&M Aggies. It was their first SEC Championship Game appearance in their first season in the conference.

== Officials ==
Steve Marlowe was the referee for the game. Brent Sowell served as umpire; Chad Green as head linesman; Jeremiah Harris as line judge; Phillip Davenport as field judge; Justin Larrew as side judge; Keith Parham as back judge; and Jason McArthur as center judge.

== Scoring summary ==
2024 SEC Championship Game

Quarter	1	2	3	4	OT	Total
No. 5 Georgia	0	3	10	3	6	22
No. 2 Texas	3	3	0	10	3	19

at Mercedes-Benz Stadium • Atlanta, Georgia

- Date: December 7, 2024
- Game time: 4:00 p.m.
- Game weather: Sunny (indoors) • Temperature: 56 °F (13 °C)
- Referee: Steve Marlowe
- TV announcers (ABC): Chris Fowler (play-by-play), Kirk Herbstreit (analyst), Holly Rowe and Laura Rutledge (sideline)

Game information

First quarter

- (5:17) TEX – Bert Auburn 41 yd Field Goal (Drive: 9 plays, 64 yards, 4:10; Texas 3–0)

Second quarter

- (10:22) TEX – Bert Auburn 42 yd Field Goal (Drive: 14 plays, 56 yards, 7:24; Texas 6–0)
- (6:41) UGA – Peyton Woodring 44 yd Field Goal (Drive: 8 plays, 49 yards, 3:50; Texas 6–3)

Third quarter

- (10:27) UGA – Trevor Etienne 10 yd Run (Peyton Woodring Kick) (Drive: 10 plays, 75 yards, 4:33; Georgia 10–6)
- (0:16) UGA – Peyton Woodring 24 yd Field Goal (Drive: 9 plays, 61 yards, 4:40; Georgia 13–6)

Fourth quarter

- (13:54) TEX – DeAndre Moore Jr. 41-yard pass from Quinn Ewers, Bert Auburn kick (Drive: 5 plays, 75 yards, 1:22; Tied 13–13)
- (4:32) UGA – Peyton Woodring 21 yd Field Goal (Drive: 16 plays, 72 yards, 9:22; Georgia 16–13)
- (0:18) TEX – Bert Auburn 37 yd Field Goal (Drive: 11 plays, 47 yards, 2:12; Tied 16–16)

Overtime

- TEX – Bert Auburn 32 yd Field Goal (Drive: 7 plays, 10 yards; Texas 19–16)
- UGA – Trevor Etienne 4 yd Run (Drive: 6 plays, 25 yards; Georgia 22–19)

=== Statistics ===
Statistics	UGA	TEX
First downs	19	21
Plays–yards	67–277	74–389
Rushes–yards	37–141	28–31
Passing yards	136	358
Passing: comp–att–int	20–30–1	27–46–2
Time of possession	31:59	28:01

Team	Category	Player	Statistics
Georgia	Passing	Gunner Stockton	12/16, 71 yards, 1 INT
Georgia	Rushing	Trevor Etienne	16 carries, 94 yards, 2 TD
Georgia	Receiving	Arian Smith	5 receptions, 41 yards
Texas	Passing	Quinn Ewers	27/46, 358 yards, 1 TD, 2 INT
Texas	Rushing	Quintrevion Wisner	19 carries, 51 yards
Texas	Receiving	Matthew Golden	8 receptions, 162 yards
