= 2025 Georgia Bulldogs football team =

American college football season

2025 Georgia Bulldogs football

SEC champion

SEC Championship Game, W 28–7 vs. Alabama

Sugar Bowl (CFP Quarterfinal), L 34–39 vs. Ole Miss
- Conference: Southeastern Conference

Ranking
- Coaches: No. 5
- AP: No. 6
- Record: 12–2 (7–1 SEC)
- Head coach: Kirby Smart (10th season)
- Offensive coordinator: Mike Bobo (11th season)
- Offensive scheme: Pro spread
- Defensive coordinator: Glenn Schumann (7th season)
- Co-defensive coordinator: Travaris Robinson (2nd season)
- Base defense: 3–4
- Home stadium: Sanford Stadium

Uniform
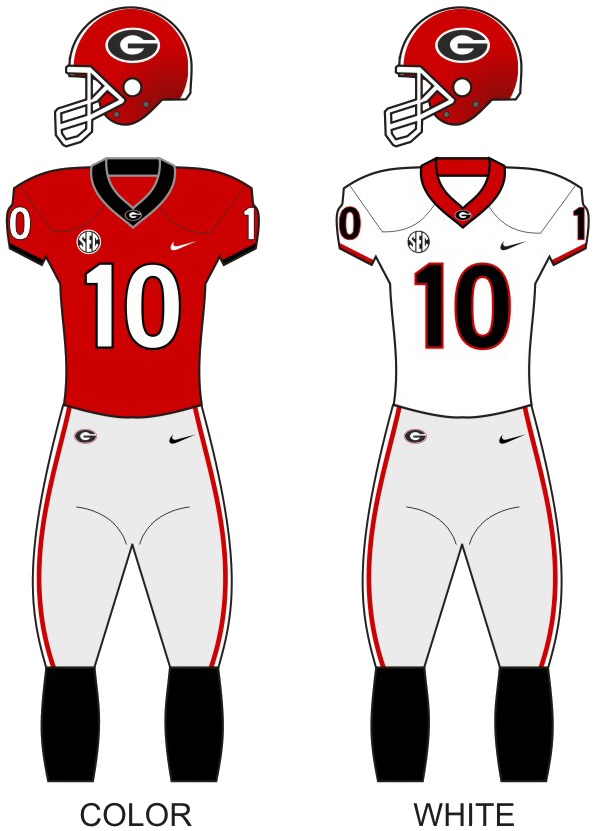

2025 Southeastern Conference football standings
	Conf.			Overall
Team	W		L	W		L
No. 9 Alabama y^	7	–	1	11	–	4
No. 6 Georgia y$^	7	–	1	12	–	2
No. 3 Ole Miss ^	7	–	1	13	–	2
No. 8 Texas A&M ^	7	–	1	11	–	2
No. 13 Oklahoma ^	6	–	2	10	–	3
No. 12 Texas	6	–	2	10	–	3
No. 15 Vanderbilt	6	–	2	10	–	3
Missouri	4	–	4	8	–	5
Tennessee	4	–	4	8	–	5
LSU	3	–	5	7	–	6
Kentucky	2	–	6	5	–	7
Florida	2	–	6	4	–	8
Auburn	1	–	7	5	–	7
Mississippi State	1	–	7	5	–	8
South Carolina	1	–	7	4	–	8
Arkansas	0	–	8	2	–	10
Championship: Georgia 28, Alabama 7
^ – College Football Playoff participant; $ – Conference champion; y – Championship game participant; Rankings from AP Poll

The 2025 Georgia Bulldogs football team represented the University of Georgia as a member of the Southeastern Conference (SEC) during the 2025 NCAA Division I FBS football season. The team was led by tenth-year head coach Kirby Smart and played their homes game in Sanford Stadium.

Georgia began the season as the No. 5 ranked team in the AP Poll. The Bulldogs began the season with two wins over nonconference opponents Marshall and Austin Peay before earning their first SEC win of the season on the road against Tennessee. They returned home to face Alabama, losing 24–21, their first loss at home since 2019. The Bulldogs rebounded by soundly defeating Kentucky the following week and then knocking off rival Auburn on the road. They then outlasted Ole Miss 43–35, jumping to No. 5 in the AP Poll entering a bye week.

Following the bye week, Georgia defeated rival Florida in Jacksonville and Mississippi State in Starkville. The Bulldogs then returned home for a two-game home stretch, including a 35–10 victory over Texas and a 35–3 win over Charlotte. In the final game of the regular season, Georgia defeated rival Georgia Tech, 16–9, at Mercedes-Benz Stadium. In the 2025 SEC Championship Game, the Bulldogs avenged their lone loss to Alabama, defeating the Crimson Tide, 28–7, to repeat as SEC champions and clinch an automatic bid to the College Football Playoff as one of the top five highest-ranked conference champions. In the quarterfinals of the College Football Playoff, Georgia rematched Ole Miss in the 2026 Sugar Bowl, losing 39–34 to end their season.

== Offseason ==
=== Entered NFL draft ===
In December 2024, QB Carson Beck (#15) announced he would enter the NFL draft, although he later decided instead to transfer to Miami. Safety Malaki Starks (#24), linebacker Jalon Walker (#11), and defensive end Mykel Williams (#13) declared for the draft on January 6, 2025. The deadline for players to declare for the NFL draft was January 15, 2025.

Thirteen Georgia players were drafted in 2025.

During the first round of the draft that April, Williams was the San Francisco 49ers's 11th pick, Walker was picked 15th by the Atlanta Falcons, and Starks was chosen 27th by the Baltimore Ravens. In the second round, guard Tate Ratledge (#51) was picked by the Detroit Lions; in the third round, guard Dylan Fairchild (#53) was chosen by the Cincinnati Bengals and center Jared Wilson (#55) was selected by the New England Patriots.

In the remaining rounds, seven more Bulldogs were drafted: Arian Smith (#11) and Trevor Etienne (#1) in the fourth round, Tyrion Ingram-Dawkins (#93) and Smael Mondon Jr. (#2) in the fifth round, Warren Brinson (#97) in the sixth round and, Dan Jackson (#17) and Dominic Lovett (#6) in the seventh round.

=== Transfer portal ===
As of January 10, 2025, 12 Georgia Bulldogs players have entered the NCAA transfer portal during or after the 2024 season. Over the offseason, as of July 24, 2025, Georgia has added seven players from the transfer portal.

==== Departures ====
Jaden Rashada (#10) entered the portal in early January 2025. Speaking about his time at Georgia, Rashada said, "I feel like I needed this year a lot, and it's exceeded every expectation plus some more." Outside linebacker Damon Wilson II (#10) transferred to Missouri.

Departing transfers
Name	No.	Pos.	Height/weight	Class	Hometown	New school	Sources
Troy Bowles	#0	LB	6'1", 185	Sophomore	Tampa, FL	Michigan	
Anthony Evans III	#5	WR	5'11", 165	Sophomore	Converse, TX	Mississippi State	
Justyn Rhett	#9	S	6'1", 200	(redshirt) Freshman	Las Vegas, NV	Nebraska	
Jaden Rashada	#10	QB	6'4", 190	(redshirt) Freshman	Pittsburg, CA	Sacramento State	
Damon Wilson II	#10	OLB	6'4", 250	Sophomore	Nokomis, FL	Missouri	
Julian Humphrey	#12	CB	6'1", 195	(redshirt) Sophomore	Webster, TX	Texas A&M	
Michael Jackson III	#13	WR	6'0", 209	Senior	Las Vegas, NV		
David Daniel-Sisavanh	#14	S	6'2", 185	Senior	Woodstock, GA	Troy	
Carson Beck	#15	QB	6'4", 220	(redshirt) Senior	Jacksonville, FL	Miami	
Jake Pope	#22	S	5'11", 200	(redshirt) Sophomore	Buford, GA	UNLV	
Branson Robinson	#22	RB	5'10", 220	(redshirt) Sophomore	Canton, MS	Georgia State	
Collin Gill	#25	CB	6'0", 215	Freshman	Fort Washington, MD		
Samuel M'Pemba	#26	OLB	6'3", 205	Sophomore	Olivette, MO	Texas A&M	
Chris Peal	#27	DB	6'1", 195	(redshirt) Freshman	Charlotte, NC	Syracuse	
Jamaal Jarrett	#55	DL	6'5", 350	Sophomore	Greensboro, NC	USC	

==== Incoming ====
Brothers Zachariah and Zion Branch committed to Georgia from USC. On January 7, 2025, Noah Thomas transferred to Georgia from Texas A&M.

Incoming transfers
Name	No.	Pos.	Height/weight	Year	Hometown	Prev. school	Sources
Zachariah Branch	#1	WR/RS	5'10", 175	Sophomore	Las Vegas, NV	USC	
Zion Branch	#2	S	6'2", 210	(redshirt) Sophomore	Las Vegas, NV	USC	
Noah Thomas	#5	WR	6'6", 200	Junior	Pearland, TX	Texas A&M	
Jaden Harris	#12	S	6'0", 195	(redshirt) Sophomore	Atlanta, GA	Miami (FL)	
Adrian Maddox	#14	S	6'3", 200	Junior	Conyers, GA	UAB	
Micah Bell	#26	RB	5'10", 177	Junior	Houston, TX	Vanderbilt	

=== G-Day ===
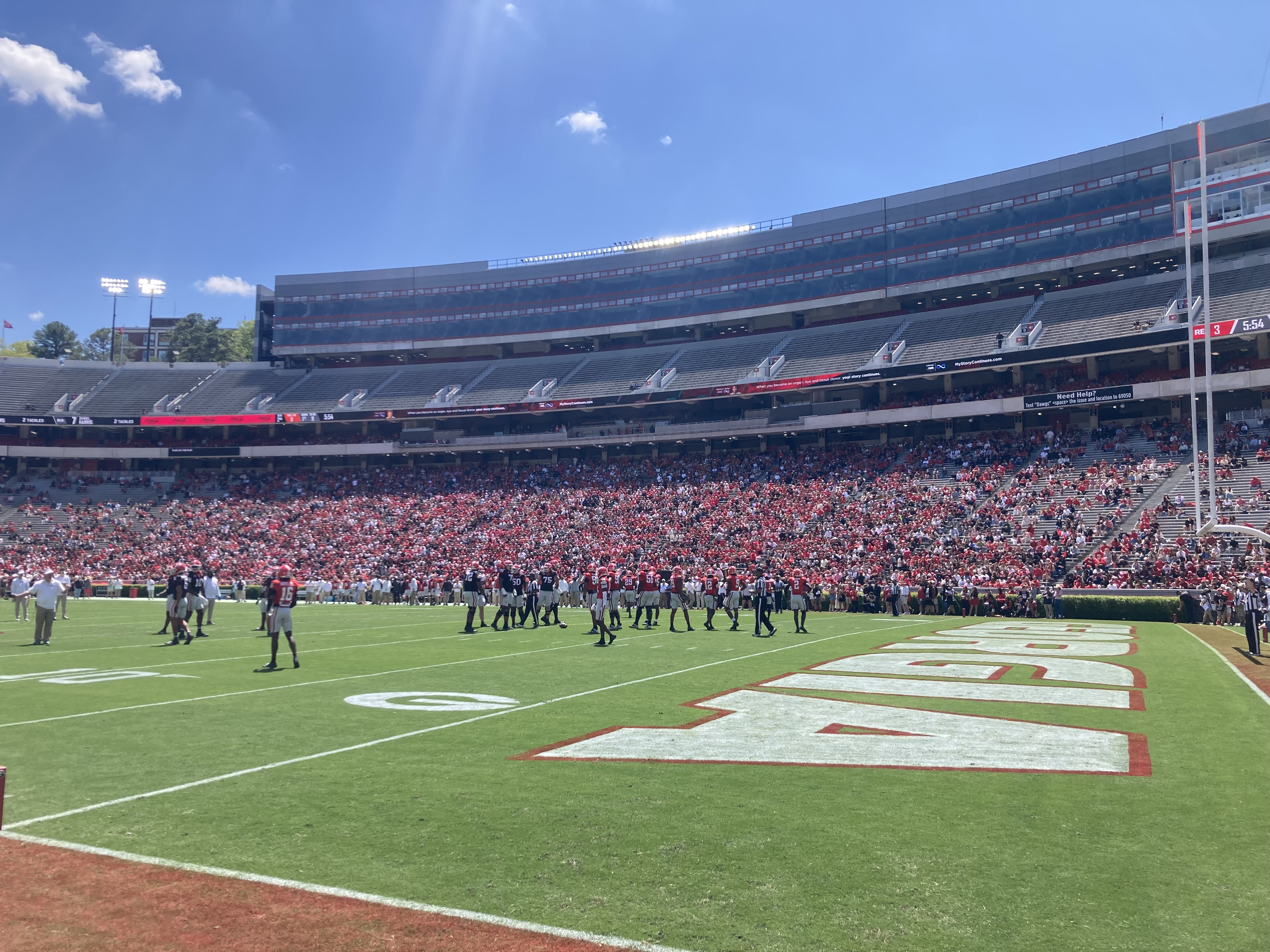
The Bulldogs' annual practice game known as "G-Day", April 2025

Georgia's final spring practice, annually open to the public and known as "G-Day", took place at 1:00 p.m. on April 12, 2025. Although the scrimmage is usually broadcast on TV, it was not televised this year. The red team defeated the black team 34–17 in front of a crowd of 35,000.

2025 G-Day Spring Game

Quarter	1	2	3	4	Total
UGA Red	3	10	14	7	34
UGA Black	0	3	14	0	17

at Sanford Stadium, Athens, GA

- Date: April 12, 2025
- Game time: 1:00 p.m. EDT
- Game attendance: 35,003

== Schedule ==
Date	Time	Opponent	Rank	Site	TV	Result	Attendance
August 30	3:30 p.m.	Marshall*	No. 5	Sanford Stadium; Athens, GA	ESPN	W 45–7	93,033
September 6	2:28 p.m.	Austin Peay*	No. 4	Sanford Stadium; Athens, GA	SECN+/ESPN+	W 28–6	93,033
September 13	3:30 p.m.	at No. 15 Tennessee	No. 6	Neyland Stadium; Knoxville, TN (rivalry, College GameDay)	ABC	W 44–41 ^{OT}	101,915
September 27	7:30 p.m.	No. 17 Alabama	No. 5	Sanford Stadium; Athens, GA (rivalry, SEC Nation)	ABC	L 21–24	93,033
October 4	12:00 p.m.	Kentucky^{†}	No. 12	Sanford Stadium; Athens, GA	ABC/SECN	W 35–14	93,033
October 11	7:30 p.m.	at Auburn	No. 10	Jordan–Hare Stadium; Auburn, AL (Deep South's Oldest Rivalry)	ABC	W 20–10	88,043
October 18	3:30 p.m.	No. 5 Ole Miss	No. 9	Sanford Stadium; Athens, GA (College GameDay)	ABC	W 43–35	93,033
November 1	3:30 p.m.	vs. Florida	No. 5	EverBank Stadium; Jacksonville, FL (rivalry)	ABC	W 24–20	76,131
November 8	12:00 p.m.	at Mississippi State	No. 5	Davis Wade Stadium; Starkville, MS (SEC Nation)	ESPN	W 41–21	53,017
November 15	7:30 p.m.	No. 10 Texas	No. 5	Sanford Stadium; Athens, GA (SEC Nation)	ABC	W 35–10	93,033
November 22	12:45 p.m.	Charlotte*	No. 4	Sanford Stadium; Athens, GA	SECN	W 35–3	93,033
November 28	3:30 p.m.	vs. No. 23 Georgia Tech*	No. 4	Mercedes-Benz Stadium; Atlanta, GA (Clean, Old-Fashioned Hate)	ABC	W 16–9	73,728
December 6	4:00 p.m.	vs. No. 9 Alabama	No. 3	Mercedes-Benz Stadium; Atlanta, GA (SEC Championship Game, rivalry, College GameDay, SEC Nation)	ABC	W 28–7	77,247
January 1, 2026	8:00 p.m.	vs. (6) No. 6 Ole Miss*	(3) No. 3	Caesars Superdome; New Orleans, LA (Sugar Bowl–CFP Quarterfinal, SEC Nation)	ESPN	L 34–39	68,371
*Non-conference game; ^{†}Homecoming; Rankings from AP Poll (and CFP Rankings, after November 4) - Released prior to game; All times are in Eastern time; Source:

== Rankings ==
Ranking movements Legend: ██ Increase in ranking ██ Decrease in ranking ( ) = First-place votes
	Week																
Poll	Pre	1	2	3	4	5	6	7	8	9	10	11	12	13	14	15	Final
AP	5 (1)	4	6	5	5	12	10	9	5	5	5	5	4	4	3	2	6
Coaches	4 (3)	3 (1)	3	3 (1)	3 (1)	10	9	7	5	5	5	5	4	4	3	2 (1)	5
CFP	Not released										5	5	4	4	3	3	Not released

== Game summaries ==
=== vs. Marshall ===
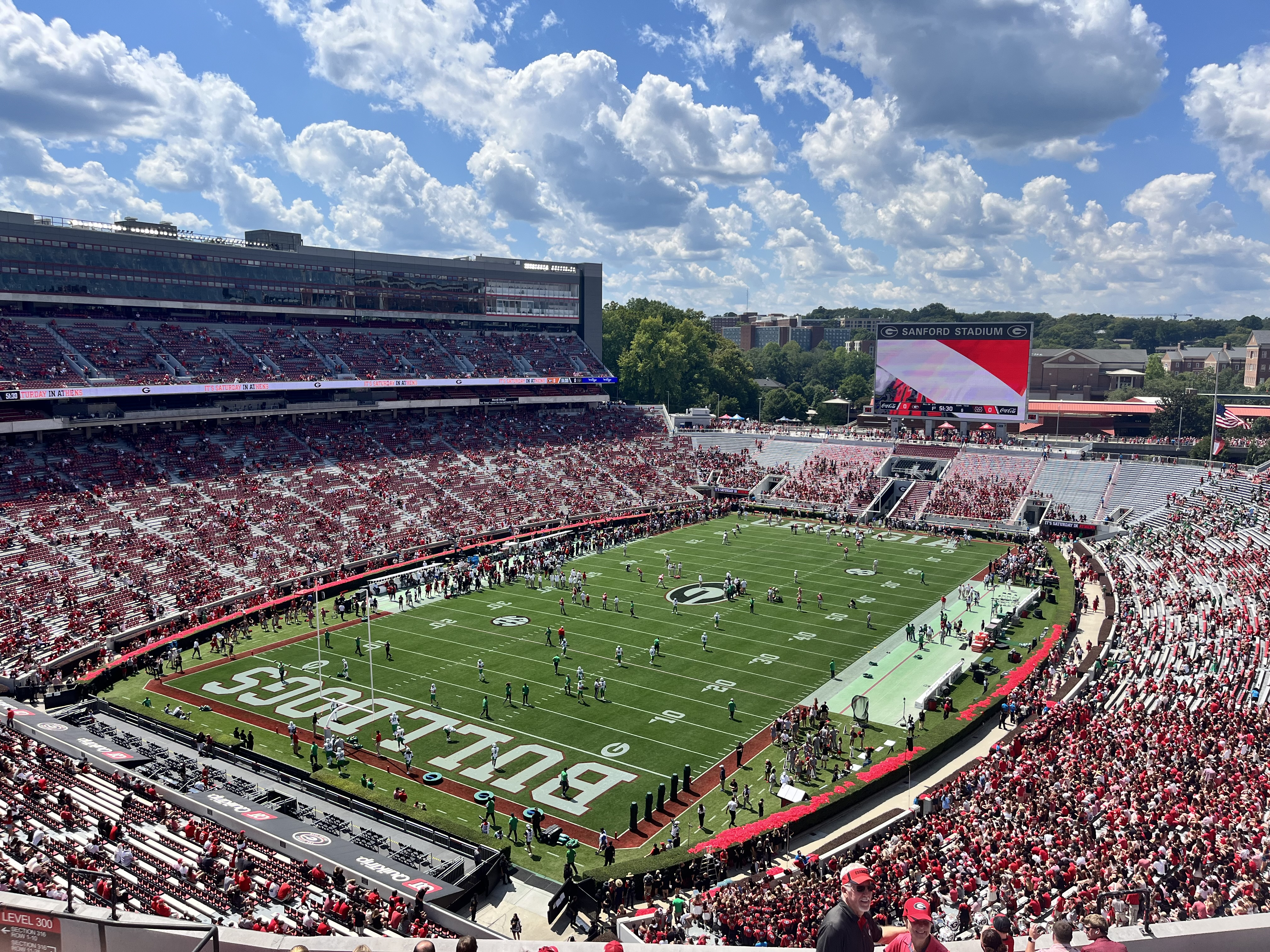
Marshall vs. Georgia on August 30, 2025 at Sanford Stadium

Kickoff happened at 3:40 p.m. The Bulldogs defeated the Thundering Herd 45–7.

Marshall Thundering Herd (0–0) at No. 5 Georgia Bulldogs (0–0) – Game summary

Quarter	1	2	3	4	Total
Thundering Herd	0	0	0	7	7
No. 5 Bulldogs	14	10	14	7	45

at Sanford Stadium • Athens, Georgia

- Date: August 30
- Game time: 3:30 p.m. (delayed to 3:40 p.m.)
- Game weather: Sunny • Temperature: 83 °F (28 °C) • Wind: E 5 mph
- Game attendance: 93,033
- Referee: Lee Hendrick
- TV announcers (ESPN): Mike Monaco (play-by-play), Kirk Morrison (analyst), and Dawn Davenport (sideline)
- Report: Official report

Game information

First quarter

- (9:22) UGA – Dwight Phillips Jr. 17-yard run, Peyton Woodring kick (Drive: 8 plays, 70 yards, 4:17; Georgia 7–0)
- (2:21) UGA – Gunner Stockton 13-yard run, Peyton Woodring kick (Drive: 11 plays, 72 yards, 5:13; Georgia 14–0)

Second quarter

- (9:07) UGA – Gunner Stockton 11-yard run, Peyton Woodring kick (Drive: 3 plays, 20 yards, 1:08; Georgia 21–0)
- (0:24) UGA – Peyton Woodring 43-yard field goal (Drive: 9 plays, 44 yards, 1:03; Georgia 24–0)

Third quarter

- (13:13) UGA – Zachariah Branch 47-yard pass from Gunner Stockton, Peyton Woodring kick (Drive: 4 plays, 75 yards, 1:47; Georgia 31–0)
- (3:51) UGA – London Humphreys 2-yard pass from Gunner Stockton, Peyton Woodring kick (Drive: 8 plays, 55 yards, 4:23; Georgia 38–0)

Fourth quarter

- (14:18) UGA – Elyiss Williams 23-yard pass from Ryan Puglisi, Peyton Woodring kick (Drive: 8 plays, 80 yards, 3:23; Georgia 45–0)
- (10:27) MRSH – Jo'Shon Barbie 1-yard run, Lorcan Quinn kick (Drive: 7 plays, 84 yards, 3:46; Georgia 45–7)

Statistics	MRSH	UGA
First downs	7	27
Plays–yards	52–207	76–488
Rushes–yards	31–78	44–239
Passing yards	129	249
Passing: Comp–Att–Int	11–21–0	19–32–0
Turnovers	0	0
Time of possession	25:31	34:29

Team	Category	Player	Statistics
Marshall	Passing	Zion Turner	6/7, 100 yards
Marshall	Rushing	Justin Williams-Thomas	4 carries, 24 yards
Marshall	Receiving	Xayvian Turner-Bradshaw	3 receptions, 58 yards
Georgia	Passing	Gunner Stockton	14/24, 190 yards, 2 TD
Georgia	Rushing	Gunner Stockton	10 carries, 73 yards, 2 TD
Georgia	Receiving	Zachariah Branch	3 receptions, 95 yards, TD

=== vs. Austin Peay (FCS) ===
The game started an hour early at 2:30 p.m. due to possible weather; a delay began during halftime.

Austin Peay Governors (FCS) (1–0) at No. 4 Georgia Bulldogs (1–0) – Game summary

Quarter	1	2	3	4	Total
Governors (FCS)	0	3	3	0	6
No. 4 Bulldogs	7	7	7	7	28

at Sanford Stadium • Athens, Georgia

- Date: September 6
- Game time: 2:30 p.m. (moved up from 3:30 p.m.)
- Game weather: Cloudy; thunder nearby • Temperature: 83 °F (28 °C) • Wind: N 5 mph
- Game attendance: 93,033
- Referee: Jason McArthur
- TV announcers (SECN+/ESPN+): Clay Matvick (play-by-play), Chase Daniel (analyst), and Madison Fitzpatrick (sideline)
- Report: Official report

Game information

First quarter

- (5:55) UGA – Chauncey Bowens 2 yard run, Peyton Woodring kick (Drive: 10 plays, 80 yards, 5:16; Georgia 7–0)

Second quarter

- (13:50) UGA – Nate Frazier 2 yard run, Peyton Woodring kick (Drive: 9 plays, 56 yards, 4:56; Georgia 14–0)
- (9:08) APU – Carson Smith 44 yard field goal (Drive: 8 plays, 48 yards, 4:42; Georgia 14–3)

Third quarter

- (10:54) UGA – Chauncey Bowens 14 yard run, Peyton Woodring kick (Drive: 7 plays, 60 yards, 2:41; Georgia 21–3)
- (5:51) APU – Carson Smith 43 yard field goal (Drive: 4 plays, 5 yards, 1:57; Georgia 21–6)

Fourth quarter

- (5:39) UGA – Nate Frazier 1 yard run, Peyton Woodring kick (Drive: 17 plays, 99 yards, 8:43; Georgia 28–6)

Statistics	APSU	UGA
First downs	10	26
Plays–yards	51–196	76–421
Rushes–yards	28–45	40–190
Passing yards	151	231
Passing: comp–att–int	16–23–1	27–36–0
Turnovers	1	2
Time of possession	26:51	33:09

Team	Category	Player	Statistics
Austin Peay	Passing	Chris Parson	16/23, 151 yards, INT
Austin Peay	Rushing	Corey Richardson	7 carries, 33 yards
Austin Peay	Receiving	Kamari Maxwell	3 receptions, 41 yards
Georgia	Passing	Gunner Stockton	26/34, 227 yards
Georgia	Rushing	Nate Frazier	14 carries, 69 yards, 2 TD
Georgia	Receiving	Colbie Young	7 receptions, 76 yards

=== at No. 15 Tennessee (rivalry) ===
No. 6 Georgia Bulldogs (2–0) at No. 15 Tennessee Volunteers (2–0) – Game summary

Quarter	1	2	3	4	OT	Total
No. 6 Bulldogs	7	10	10	11	6	44
No. 15 Volunteers	21	0	7	10	3	41

at Neyland Stadium • Knoxville, Tennessee

- Date: September 13
- Game time: 3:30 p.m.
- Game weather: Sunny • Temperature: 85 °F (29 °C) • Wind: W 2 mph
- Game attendance: 101,915
- Referee: Steve Marlowe
- TV announcers (ABC): Chris Fowler (play-by-play), Kirk Herbstreit (analyst), and Holly Rowe (sideline)
- Report: Official report

Game information

First quarter

- (12:30) TENN – Joey Aguilar 4 yard run, Max Gilbert kick (Drive: 8 plays, 75 yards, 2:30; Tennessee 7–0)
- (9:58) UGA – Gunner Stockton 6 yard run, Peyton Woodring kick (Drive: 6 plays, 75 yards, 2:32; Tied 7–7)
- (9:29) TENN – Chris Brazzell II 72 yard pass from Joey Aguilar, Max Gilbert kick (Drive: 2 plays, 75 yards, 0:29; Tennessee 14–7)
- (3:37) TENN – Chris Brazzell II 14 yard pass from Joey Aguilar, Max Gilbert kick (Drive: 11 plays, 83 yards, 4:57; Tennessee 21–7)

Second quarter

- (14:52) UGA – Zachariah Branch 36 yard pass from Gunner Stockton, Peyton Woodring kick (Drive: 9 plays, 72 yards, 3:45; Tennessee 21–14)
- (1:42) UGA – Peyton Woodring 20 yard field goal (Drive: 14 plays, 88 yards, 6:15; Tennessee 21–17)

Third quarter

- (7:19) UGA – Josh McCray 1 yard run, Peyton Woodring kick (Drive: 14 plays, 75 yards, 7:41; Georgia 24–21)
- (1:45) UGA – Peyton Woodring 48 yard field goal (Drive: 4 plays, 7 yards, 2:03; Georgia 27–21)
- (0:07) TENN – Chris Brazzell II 56 yard pass from Joey Aguilar, Max Gilbert kick (Drive: 5 plays, 75 yards, 1:38; Tennessee 28–27)

Fourth quarter

- (12:17) UGA – Peyton Woodring 24 yard field goal (Drive: 8 plays, 69 yards, 2:50; Georgia 30–28)
- (11:01) TENN – Braylon Staley II 32 yard pass from Joey Aguilar, Max Gilbert kick (Drive: 4 plays, 75 yards, 1:16; Tennessee 35–30)
- (6:40) TENN – Max Gilbert 48 yard field goal (Drive: 4 plays, 4 yards, 1:41; Tennessee 38–30)
- (2:32) UGA – London Humphreys 28 yard pass from Gunner Stockton, (Gunner Stockton pass to Zachariah Branch) (Drive: 9 plays, 75 yards, 4:08; Tied 38–38)

Overtime

- TENN – Max Gilbert 42 yard field goal (Drive: 4 plays, 1 yard; Tennessee 41–38)
- UGA – Josh McCray 1 yard run (Drive: 3 plays, 25 yards; Georgia 44–41)

Statistics	UGA	TENN
First downs	28	23
Plays–yards	87–502	70–496
Rushes–yards	55–198	34–125
Passing yards	304	371
Passing: comp–att–int	23–32–1	24–36–2
Turnovers	2	2
Time of possession	50:38	24:15

Team	Category	Player	Statistics
Georgia	Passing	Gunner Stockton	23/31, 304 yards, 2 TD
Georgia	Rushing	Nate Frazier	14 carries, 73 yards
Georgia	Receiving	Colbie Young	4 receptions, 73 yards
Tennessee	Passing	Joey Aguilar	24/36, 371 yards, 4 TD, 2 INT
Tennessee	Rushing	Star Thomas	9 carries, 60 yards
Tennessee	Receiving	Chris Brazzell II	6 receptions, 177 yards, 3 TD

=== vs. No. 17 Alabama (rivalry) ===
No. 17 Alabama Crimson Tide (2–1) at No. 5 Georgia Bulldogs (3–0) – Game summary

Quarter	1	2	3	4	Total
No. 17 Crimson Tide	7	17	0	0	24
No. 5 Bulldogs	0	14	7	0	21

at Sanford Stadium • Athens, Georgia

- Date: September 27
- Game time: 7:30 p.m.
- Game weather: Cloudy • Temperature: 76 °F (24 °C) • Wind: NW 2 mph
- Game attendance: 93,033
- Referee: Kyle Olson
- TV announcers (ABC): Chris Fowler (play-by-play), Kirk Herbstreit (analyst), Holly Rowe and Laura Rutledge (sideline reporters)
- Report: Official report

Game information

First quarter

- (7:41) ALA – Germie Bernard 6-yard pass from Ty Simpson, Conor Talty kick (Drive: 14 plays, 74 yards, 6:30; Alabama 7–0)

Second quarter

- (14:01) ALA – Isaiah Horton 6-yard pass from Ty Simpson, Conor Talty kick (Drive: 14 plays, 83 yards, 6:57; Alabama 14–0)
- (12:48) UGA – Colbie Young 38-yard pass from Gunner Stockton, Peyton Woodring kick (Drive: 3 plays, 75 yards, 1:13; Alabama 14–7)
- (8:30) ALA – Conor Talty 24-yard field goal (Drive: 4 plays, 5 yards, 1:28; Alabama 17–7)
- (2:08) UGA – Chauncey Bowens 2-yard run, Peyton Woodring kick (Drive: 11 plays, 75 yards, 6:22; Alabama 17–14)
- (0:34) ALA – Ty Simpson 2-yard run, Conor Talty kick (Drive: 8 plays, 75 yards, 1:34; Alabama 24–14)

Third quarter

- (6:30) UGA – Josh McCray 1-yard run, Peyton Woodring kick (Drive: 6 plays, 74 yards, 3:07; Alabama 24–21)

Fourth quarter

No scoring plays

Statistics	ALA	UGA
First downs	25	17
Plays–yards	77–397	53–357
Rushes–yards	38–117	33–227
Passing yards	280	130
Passing: comp–att–int	25–39–0	13–20–0
Turnovers	0	1
Time of possession	35:36	24:24

Team	Category	Player	Statistics
Alabama	Passing	Ty Simpson	24/38, 276 yards, 2 TD
Alabama	Rushing	Jam Miller	16 carries, 46 yards
Alabama	Receiving	Isaiah Horton	5 receptions, 65 yards, TD
Georgia	Passing	Gunner Stockton	13/20, 130 yards, TD
Georgia	Rushing	Chauncey Bowens	12 carries, 119 yards, TD
Georgia	Receiving	Colbie Young	4 receptions, 59 yards, TD

=== vs. Kentucky ===
Kentucky Wildcats (2–2) at No. 12 Georgia Bulldogs (3–1) – Game summary

Quarter	1	2	3	4	Total
Wildcats	0	7	0	7	14
No. 12 Bulldogs	14	7	14	0	35

at Sanford Stadium • Athens, Georgia

- Date: October 4
- Game time: 12:00 p.m.
- Game weather: Cloudy • Temperature: 70 °F (21 °C) • Wind: E 9 mph (14 km/h)
- Game attendance: 93,033
- Referee: Jeff Heaser
- TV announcers (ABC): Joe Tessitore (play-by-play), Jesse Palmer (analyst), and Katie George (sideline)
- Report: Official report

Game information

First quarter

- (8:51) UGA – Gunner Stockton-7 yard run, Peyton Woodring kick (Drive: 12 plays, 75 yards, 6:09; Georgia 7–0)
- (0:55) UGA – Gunner Stockton 6-yard run, Peyton Woodring kick (Drive: 13 plays, 96 yards, 5:15; Georgia 14–0)

Second quarter

- (14:21) UK – Josh Kattus 29-yard pass from Cutter Boley, Jacob Kauwe kick (Drive: 4 plays, 75 yards, 1:34; Georgia 14–7)
- (2:45) UGA – Dillon Bell 3-yard run, Peyton Woodring kick (Drive: 6 plays, 40 yards, 2:49; Georgia 21–7)

Third quarter

- (2:45) UGA – Dillon Bell 3-yard run, Peyton Woodring kick (Drive: 5 plays, 38 yards, 2:21; Georgia 28–7)
- (4:23) UGA – Cash Jones 16-yard pass from Gunner Stockton, Peyton Woodring kick (Drive: 9 plays, 71 yards, 4:38; Georgia 35–7)

Fourth quarter

- (1:51) UK – Kendrick Law 5-yard pass from Cutter Boley, Jacob Kauwe kick (Drive: 3 plays, 23 yards, 0:31; Georgia 35–14)

Statistics	UK	UGA
First downs	19	26
Plays–yards	64–270	71–425
Rushes–yards	22–45	44–180
Passing yards	225	245
Passing: comp–att–int	25–42–1	18–27–2
Turnovers	2	2
Time of possession	26:20	33:40

Team	Category	Player	Statistics
Kentucky	Passing	Cutter Boley	25/41, 225 yards, 2 TD, INT
Kentucky	Rushing	Seth McGowan	11 carries, 44 yards
Kentucky	Receiving	Kendrick Law	6 receptions, 64 yards, TD
Georgia	Passing	Gunner Stockton	15/23, 196 yards, TD, INT
Georgia	Rushing	Chauncey Bowens	15 carries, 70 yards
Georgia	Receiving	Dillon Bell	4 receptions, 68 yards

=== at Auburn (Deep South's Oldest Rivalry) ===
No. 10 Georgia Bulldogs (4–1) at Auburn Tigers (3–2) – Game summary

Quarter	1	2	3	4	Total
No. 10 Bulldogs	0	3	10	7	20
Tigers	7	3	0	0	10

at Jordan–Hare Stadium • Auburn, Alabama

- Date: October 11
- Game time: 7:30 p.m.
- Game weather: Clear • Temperature: 72 °F (22 °C)
- Game attendance: 88,043
- Referee: Ken Williamson
- TV announcers (ABC): Sean McDonough (play-by-play), Greg McElroy (analyst), and Molly McGrath (sideline)
- Report: Official report

Game information

First quarter

- (7:39) AUB – Jackson Arnold 2-yard run, Alex McPherson kick (Drive: 14 plays, 75 yards, 7:21; Auburn 7–0)

Second quarter

- (13:41) AUB – Alex McPherson 25-yard field goal (Drive: 12 plays, 70 yards, 5:32; Auburn 10–0)
- (0:13) UGA – Peyton Woodring 29-yard field goal (Drive: 12 plays, 88 yards, 1:19; Auburn 10–3)

Third quarter

- (7:23) UGA – Chauncey Bowens 2-yard run, Peyton Woodring kick (Drive: 5 plays, 63 yards, 1:47; Tied 10–10)
- (1:22) UGA – Peyton Woodring 53-yard field goal (Drive: 9 plays, 25 yards, 4:21; Georgia 13–10)

Fourth quarter

- (1:53) UGA – Gunner Stockton 10-yard run, Peyton Woodring kick (Drive: 16 plays, 78 yards, 8:45; Georgia 20–10)

Statistics	UGA	AUB
First downs	21	18
Plays–yards	69–296	67–277
Rushes–yards	31–79	36–140
Passing yards	217	137
Passing: comp–att–int	24–38–0	19–3–0
Turnovers	0	1
Time of possession	30:12	29:48

Team	Category	Player	Statistics
Georgia	Passing	Gunner Stockton	24/37, 217 yards
Georgia	Rushing	Gunner Stockton	9 carries, 26 yards, TD
Georgia	Receiving	Zachariah Branch	9 receptions, 57 yards
Auburn	Passing	Jackson Arnold	19/31, 137 yards
Auburn	Rushing	Jackson Arnold	13 carries, 55 yards, TD
Auburn	Receiving	Cam Coleman	7 receptions, 50 yards

=== vs. No. 5 Ole Miss ===
No. 5 Ole Miss Rebels (6–0) at No. 9 Georgia Bulldogs (5–1) – Game summary

Quarter	1	2	3	4	Total
No. 5 Rebels	7	14	14	0	35
No. 9 Bulldogs	3	17	6	17	43

at Sanford Stadium • Athens, Georgia

- Date: October 18
- Game time: 3:30 p.m.
- Game weather: Sunny • Temperature: 78 °F (26 °C) • Wind: SW 6 mph
- Game attendance: 93,033
- Referee: Daniel Gautreaux
- TV announcers (ABC): Chris Fowler (play-by-play), Kirk Herbstreit (analyst), and Holly Rowe (sideline)
- Report: Official report

Game information

First quarter

- (11:05) UGA – Peyton Woodring 51-yard field goal (Drive: 7 plays, 42 yards, 3:55; Georgia 3–0)
- (5:47) MISS – Trinidad Chambliss 7-yard run, Lucas Carneiro kick (Drive: 14 plays, 65 yards, 5:18; Ole Miss 7–3)

Second quarter

- (14:56) UGA – Lawson Luckie 11-yard pass from Gunner Stockton, Peyton Woodring kick (Drive: 13 plays, 75 yards, 5:51; Georgia 10–7)
- (10:53) MISS – Kewan Lacy 1-yard run, Lucas Carneiro kick (Drive: 10 plays, 65 yards, 4:03; Ole Miss 14–10)
- (7:13) UGA – Gunner Stockton 22-yard run, Peyton Woodring kick (Drive: 8 plays, 75 yards, 3:40; Georgia 17–14)
- (2:10) MISS – Kewan Lacy 1-yard run, Lucas Carneiro kick (Drive: 11 plays, 75 yards, 5:03; Ole Miss 21–17)
- (0:00) UGA – Peyton Woodring 35-yard field goal (Drive: 12 plays, 58 yards, 2:10; Ole Miss 21–20)

Third quarter

- (14:46) MISS – De'Zhaun Stribling 75-yard pass from Trinidad Chambliss, Lucas Carneiro kick (Drive: 2 plays, 75 yards, 0:14; Ole Miss 28–20)
- (10:02) UGA – Lawson Luckie 3-yard pass from Gunner Stockton, Two-point conversion try failed (Drive: 9 plays, 75 yards, 4:44; Ole Miss 28–26)
- (4:12) MISS – Trinidad Chambliss 2-yard run, Lucas Carneiro kick (Drive: 12 plays, 75 yards, 5:50; Ole Miss 35–26)

Fourth quarter

- (12:56) UGA – Nate Frazier 3-yard pass from Gunner Stockton, Peyton Woodring kick (Drive: 12 plays, 75 yards, 6:16; Ole Miss 35–33)
- (7:29) UGA – Lawson Luckie 7-yard pass from Gunner Stockton, Peyton Woodring kick (Drive: 9 plays, 67 yards, 5:08; Georgia 40–35)
- (2:06) UGA – Peyton Woodring 42-yard field goal (Drive: 10 plays, 66 yards, 4:26; Georgia 43–35)

Statistics	MISS	UGA
First downs	21	34
Plays–yards	60–351	80–510
Rushes–yards	24–88	49–221
Passing yards	263	289
Passing: comp–att–int	19–36–0	26–31–0
Turnovers	0	0
Time of possession	22:21	37:39

Team	Category	Player	Statistics
Ole Miss	Passing	Trinidad Chambliss	19/36, 263 yards, TD
Ole Miss	Rushing	Trinidad Chambliss	9 carries, 42 yards, 2 TD
Ole Miss	Receiving	De'Zhaun Stribling	3 receptions, 96 yards, TD
Georgia	Passing	Gunner Stockton	26/31, 289 yards, 4 TD
Georgia	Rushing	Nate Frazier	17 carries, 72 yards
Georgia	Receiving	Zachariah Branch	8 receptions, 71 yards

=== vs. Florida (rivalry) ===
No. 5 Georgia Bulldogs (6–1) vs. Florida Gators (3–4) – Game summary

Quarter	1	2	3	4	Total
No. 5 Bulldogs	7	3	7	7	24
Gators	10	0	7	3	20

at EverBank Stadium • Jacksonville, Florida

- Date: November 1
- Game time: 3:30 p.m.
- Game weather: Sunny • Temperature: 71 °F (22 °C) • Wind: ENE 4 mph
- Game attendance: 76,131
- Referee: James Carter
- TV announcers (ABC): Joe Tessitore (play-by-play), Jordan Rodgers (analyst), and Katie George (sideline)
- Report: Official report

Game information

First quarter

- (10:53) UGA – Dillon Bell 8-yard pass from Gunner Stockton, Peyton Woodring kick (Drive: 8 plays, 75 yards, 4:07; Georgia 7–0)
- (6:32) FLA – Eugene Wilson III 40-yard pass from DJ Lagway, Trey Smack kick (Drive: 1 play, 40 yards, 0:07; Tied 7–7)
- (11:05) FLA – Trey Smack 22-yard field goal (Drive: 5 plays, 34 yards, 2:40; Florida 10–7)

Second quarter

- (0:12) UGA – Peyton Woodring 39-yard field goal (Drive: 7 plays, 42 yards, 0:54; Tied 10–10)

Third quarter

- (10:46) UGA – Noah Thomas 22-yard pass from Gunner Stockton, Peyton Woodring kick (Drive: 5 plays, 74 yards, 2:43; Georgia 17–10)
- (3:37) FLA – Jadan Baugh 2-yard run, Trey Smack kick (Drive: 12 plays, 79 yards, 7:05; Tied 17–17)

Fourth quarter

- (14:52) FLA – Trey Smack 54-yard field goal (Drive: 5 plays, 26 yards, 2:15; Florida 20–17)
- (4:36) UGA – Chauncey Bowens 36-yard run, Peyton Woodring kick (Drive: 7 plays, 82 yards, 3:18; Georgia 24–20)

Statistics	UGA	FLA
First downs	21	16
Plays–yards	68–361	56–281
Rushes–yards	39–138	32–115
Passing yards	223	166
Passing: comp–att–int	20–29–1	15–24–0
Turnovers	1	0
Time of possession	32:25	27:35

Team	Category	Player	Statistics
Georgia	Passing	Gunner Stockton	20/29, 223 yards, 2 TD, INT
Georgia	Rushing	Chauncey Bowens	9 carries, 70 yards, TD
Georgia	Receiving	Zachariah Branch	10 receptions, 112 yards
Florida	Passing	DJ Lagway	15/24, 166 yards, TD
Florida	Rushing	Jadan Baugh	15 carries, 72 yards, TD
Florida	Receiving	Eugene Wilson III	9 receptions, 121 yards, TD

=== at Mississippi State ===
No. 5 Georgia Bulldogs (7–1) at Mississippi State Bulldogs (5–4) – Game summary

Quarter	1	2	3	4	Total
No. 5 Georgia	3	21	14	3	41
Mississippi State	7	0	7	7	21

at Davis Wade Stadium • Starkville, Mississippi

- Date: November 8
- Game time: 12:00 p.m.
- Game weather: Sunny • Temperature: 72 °F (22 °C) • Wind: SW 3 mph
- Game attendance: 53,017
- Referee: Daniel Gautreaux
- TV announcers (ESPN): Dave Pasch (play-by-play), Dusty Dvoracek (analyst), and Taylor McGregor (sideline)
- Report: Official report

Game information

First quarter

- (9:26) MSST – Kamario Taylor 4-yard run, Kyle Ferrie kick (Drive: 14 plays, 75 yards, 5:34; Mississippi State 7–0)
- (6:41) UGA – Peyton Woodring 49-yard field goal (Drive: 7 plays, 46 yards, 2:39; Mississippi State 7–3)

Second quarter

- (14:11) UGA – Chauncey Bowens 4-yard run, Peyton Woodring kick (Drive: 4 plays, 27 yards, 1:00; Georgia 10–7)
- (5:09) UGA – Oscar Delp 8-yard pass from Gunner Stockton, Peyton Woodring kick (Drive: 13 plays, 90 yards, 7:02; Georgia 17–7)
- (0:11) UGA – Zachariah Branch 19-yard pass from Gunner Stockton, Peyton Woodring kick (Drive: 9 plays, 77 yards, 2:14; Georgia 24–7)

Third quarter

- (12:32) UGA – Nate Frazier 59-yard run, Peyton Woodring kick (Drive: 5 plays, 75 yards, 2:28; Georgia 31–7)
- (9:57) UGA – Noah Thomas 64-yard pass from Gunner Stockton, Peyton Woodring kick (Drive: 3 plays, 72 yards, 1:33; Georgia 38–7)
- (4:49) MSST – Kamario Taylor 1-yard run, Kyle Ferrie kick (Drive: 14 plays, 75 yards, 5:09; Georgia 38–14)

Fourth quarter

- (12:03) UGA – Peyton Woodring 46-yard field goal (Drive: 8 plays, 40 yards, 3:10; Georgia 41–14)
- (4:47) MSST – Kamario Taylor 2-yard run, Kyle Ferrie kick (Drive: 5 plays, 81 yards, 1:59; Georgia 41–21)

Statistics	UGA	MSST
First downs	30	18
Plays–yards	74–567	68–322
Rushes–yards	44–303	43–149
Passing yards	264	173
Passing: comp–att–int	18–30–0	16–25–0
Turnovers	1	1
Time of possession	33:07	26:53

Team	Category	Player	Statistics
Georgia	Passing	Gunner Stockton	18/29, 264 yards, 3 TD
Georgia	Rushing	Nate Frazier	12 carries, 181 yards, TD
Georgia	Receiving	Noah Thomas	3 receptions, 78 yards, TD
Mississippi State	Passing	Kamario Taylor	6/10, 87 yards
Mississippi State	Rushing	Kamario Taylor	12 carries, 53 yards, 3 TD
Mississippi State	Receiving	Brenen Thompson	4 receptions, 92 yards

=== vs. No. 10 Texas ===
No. 10 Texas Longhorns (7–2) at No. 5 Georgia Bulldogs (8–1) – Game summary

Quarter	1	2	3	4	Total
No. 10 Longhorns	3	0	7	0	10
No. 5 Bulldogs	7	7	0	21	35

at Sanford Stadium • Athens, Georgia

- Date: November 15
- Game time: 7:30 p.m.
- Game weather: Clear • Temperature: 62 °F (17 °C) • Wind: SW 7 mph (11 km/h)
- Game attendance: 93,033
- Referee: Kyle Olson
- TV announcers (ABC): Chris Fowler (play-by-play), Kirk Herbstreit (analyst), Holly Rowe, and Laura Rutledge (sideline reporters)
- Report: Official report

Game information

First quarter

- (8:53) TEX – Mason Shipley 33-yard field goal (Drive: 13 plays, 59 yards, 6:07; Texas 3–0)
- (4:12) UGA – Noah Thomas 17-yard pass from Gunner Stockton (Peyton Woodring kick) (Drive: 9 plays, 75 yards, 4:41; Georgia 7–3)

Second quarter

- (15:00) UGA – Noah Thomas 4-yard pass from Gunner Stockton (Peyton Woodring kick) (Drive: 8 plays, 66 yards, 4:32; Georgia 14–3)

Third quarter

- (5:27) TEX – Ryan Wingo 7-yard pass from Arch Manning (Mason Shipley kick) (Drive: 6 plays, 36 yards, 2:44; Georgia 14–10)

Fourth quarter

- (14:20) UGA – London Humphreys 30-yard pass from Gunner Stockton (Peyton Woodring kick) (Drive: 10 plays, 73 yards, 6:01; Georgia 21–10)
- (8:53) UGA – Lawson Luckie 6-yard pass from Gunner Stockton (Peyton Woodring kick) (Drive: 9 plays, 53 yards, 5:27; Georgia 28–10)
- (4:43) UGA – Gunner Stockton 4-yard run (Peyton Woodring kick) (Drive: 5 plays, 33 yards, 3:06; Georgia 35–10)

Statistics	TEX	UGA
First downs	15	21
Plays–yards	60–274	64–357
Rushes–yards	17–23	35–128
Passing yards	251	229
Passing: comp–att–int	27–43–1	24–29–1
Turnovers	1	1
Time of possession	24:51	35:09

Team	Category	Player	Statistics
Texas	Passing	Arch Manning	27/43, 251 yards, TD, INT
Texas	Rushing	Quintrevion Wisner	9 carries, 37 yards
Texas	Receiving	DeAndre Moore Jr.	5 receptions, 75 yards
Georgia	Passing	Gunner Stockton	24/29, 229 yards, 4 TD, INT
Georgia	Rushing	Nate Frazier	16 carries, 72 yards
Georgia	Receiving	London Humphreys	2 receptions, 55 yards, TD

=== vs. Charlotte ===
Charlotte 49ers (1–9) at No. 4 Georgia Bulldogs (9–1) – Game summary

Quarter	1	2	3	4	Total
49ers	0	3	0	0	3
No. 4 Bulldogs	14	14	7	0	35

at Sanford Stadium • Athens, Georgia

- Date: November 22
- Game time: 12:45 p.m.
- Game weather: Cloudy • Temperature: 74 °F (23 °C) • Wind: W 10 mph (16 km/h)
- Game attendance: 93,033
- Referee: Jason Autrey
- TV announcers (SECN): Taylor Zarzour (play-by-play), Matt Stinchcomb (analyst) and Alyssa Lang (sideline)
- Report: Official report

Game information

First quarter

- (6:18) UGA – Nate Frazier 2-yard run, Peyton Woodring kick (Drive: 9 plays, 60 yards, 4:31; Georgia 7–0)
- (0:52) UGA – Nate Frazier 7-yard run, Peyton Woodring kick (Drive: 9 plays, 60 yards, 4:26; Georgia 14–0)

Second quarter

- (11:29) UGA – Bo Walker 15-yard run, Peyton Woodring kick (Drive: 6 plays, 40 yards, 3:14; Georgia 21–0)
- (3:27) UGA – Bo Walker 12-yard run, Peyton Woodring kick (Drive: 8 plays, 62 yards, 4:50; Georgia 28–0)
- (0:01) CLT – Liam Boyd 42-yard field goal (Drive: 4 plays, 12 yards, 0:38; Georgia 28–3)

Third quarter

- (11:46) UGA – Bo Walker 3-yard run, Peyton Woodring kick (Drive: 5 plays, 60 yards, 2:12; Georgia 35–3)

Fourth quarter

- No scoring plays.

Statistics	CLT	UGA
First downs	7	30
Plays–yards	66–169	75–449
Rushes–yards	17–39	42–192
Passing yards	130	257
Passing: comp–att–int	14–27–2	25–33–1
Turnovers	2	1
Time of possession	23:06	36:54

Team	Category	Player	Statistics
Charlotte	Passing	Grayson Loftis	14/27, 130 yards, 2 INT
Charlotte	Rushing	Jariel Cobb	7 carries, 26 yards
Charlotte	Receiving	E. Jai Mason	1 reception, 38 yards
Georgia	Passing	Gunner Stockton	17/21, 196 yards, INT
Georgia	Rushing	Nate Frazier	12 carries, 54 yards, 2 TD
Georgia	Receiving	Noah Thomas	4 receptions, 68 yards

=== vs. No. 23 Georgia Tech (Clean, Old-Fashioned Hate) ===
For the first time since 1913, this season's Clean, Old-Fashioned Hate rivalry game was not played at either Georgia or Georgia Tech; it instead took place at Mercedes-Benz Stadium, which paid Georgia Tech $10 million to host the game. It was also the first game of a new annual college football series held at the Benz, called the Invesco QQQ Atlanta Gridiron Classic. In 2026 the series will feature the Florida–Georgia game.

Invesco QQQ Atlanta Gridiron Classic
No. 4 Georgia Bulldogs (10–1) vs. No. 23 Georgia Tech Yellow Jackets (9–2) – Game summary

Quarter	1	2	3	4	Total
No. 4 Bulldogs	0	13	0	3	16
No. 23 Yellow Jackets	3	0	3	3	9

at Mercedes-Benz Stadium • Atlanta, Georgia

- Date: November 28
- Game time: 3:30 p.m.
- Game weather: Sunny • Temperature: 70 °F (21 °C)
- Game attendance: 73,728
- Referee: Justin Elliot
- TV announcers (ABC): Joe Tessitore (play-by-play), Jesse Palmer (analyst) and Katie George (sideline)
- Report: Official report

Game information

First quarter

- (1:20) GT – Aidan Birr 30-yard field goal (Drive: 7 plays, 24 yards, 4:27; Georgia Tech 3–0)

Second quarter

- (9:42) UGA – Peyton Woodring 22-yard field goal (Drive: 13 plays, 71 yards, 6:38; Tied 3–3)
- (4:35) UGA – Zachariah Branch 7-yard pass from Gunner Stockton, Peyton Woodring kick (Drive: 9 plays, 55 yards, 3:50; Georgia 10–3)
- (0:01) UGA – Peyton Woodring 30-yard field goal (Drive: 9 plays, 55 yards, 3:14; Georgia 13–3)

Third quarter

- (4:33) GT – Aidan Birr 44-yard field goal (Drive: 6 plays, 27 yards, 3:02; Georgia 13–6)

Fourth quarter

- (14:10) UGA – Peyton Woodring 50-yard field goal (Drive: 11 plays, 42 yards, 5:23; Georgia 16–6)
- (3:30) GT – Aidan Birr 41-yard field goal (Drive: 7 plays, 64 yards, 2:36; Georgia 16–9)

Statistics	UGA	GT
First downs	19	14
Plays–yards	67–260	50–250
Rushes–yards	46–190	23–69
Passing yards	70	181
Passing: comp–att–int	11–21–1	19–27–1
Turnovers	1	1
Time of possession	35:21	24:39

Team	Category	Player	Statistics
Georgia	Passing	Gunner Stockton	11/21, 70 yards, TD, INT
Georgia	Rushing	Nate Frazier	16 carries, 108 yards
Georgia	Receiving	Zachariah Branch	5 receptions, 53 yards
Georgia Tech	Passing	Haynes King	19/27, 181 yards, INT
Georgia Tech	Rushing	Haynes King	10 carries, 39 yards
Georgia Tech	Receiving	Isiah Canion	4 receptions, 54 yards

=== vs. No. 9 Alabama (SEC Championship Game) ===
2025 SEC Championship Game
No. 3 Georgia Bulldogs (11–1) vs. No. 9 Alabama Crimson Tide (10–2) – Game summary

Quarter	1	2	3	4	Total
No. 3 Bulldogs	7	7	7	7	28
No. 9 Crimson Tide	0	0	0	7	7

at Mercedes-Benz Stadium • Atlanta, Georgia

- Date: December 6
- Game time: 4:00 p.m.
- Game weather: Indoors
- Game attendance: 77,247
- Referee: Daniel Gautreaux
- TV announcers (ABC): Chris Fowler (play-by-play), Kirk Herbstreit (analyst), Holly Rowe, and Laura Rutledge (sidelines)
  Westwood One
  Nate Gatter (play-by-play), Derek Rackley (analyst), and Dawn Davenport (sideline)
  SEC Radio
  Dave Neal (play-by-play), Dave Archer (analyst), and Stephen Hartzell (sideline)
- Report
  Official report

Game information

First quarter

- (4:36) UGA – Roderick Robinson II 1-yard pass from Gunner Stockton, Peyton Woodring kick (Drive: 4 plays, 21 yards, 1:55; Georgia 7–0)

Second quarter

- (8:43) UGA – Dillon Bell 5-yard pass from Gunner Stockton, Peyton Woodring kick (Drive: 14 plays, 57 yards, 7:44; Georgia 14–0)

Third quarter

- (10:47) UGA – Nate Frazier 9-yard run, Peyton Woodring kick (Drive: 6 plays, 40 yards, 2:32; Georgia 21–0)

Fourth quarter

- (12:33) ALA – Germie Bernard 23-yard pass from Ty Simpson, Conor Talty kick (Drive: 9 plays, 91 yards, 2:37; Georgia 21–7)
- (6:51) UGA – Zachariah Branch 13-yard pass from Gunner Stockton, Peyton Woodring kick (Drive: 3 plays, 12 yards, 1:22; Georgia 28–7)

Statistics	UGA	ALA
First downs	16	11
Plays–yards	67–297	55–209
Rushes–yards	41–141	16–(-3)
Passing yards	156	212
Passing: comp–att–int	20–26–0	19–39–1
Turnovers	0	1
Time of possession	36:52	23:08

Team	Category	Player	Statistics
Georgia	Passing	Gunner Stockton	20/26, 156 yards, 3 TD
Georgia	Rushing	Nate Frazier	13 carries, 52 yards, TD
Georgia	Receiving	Zachariah Branch	5 receptions, 53 yards, TD
Alabama	Passing	Ty Simpson	19/39, 212 yards, TD, INT
Alabama	Rushing	Daniel Hill	4 carries, 11 yards
Alabama	Receiving	Germie Bernard	6 receptions, 62 yards, TD

=== vs. No. 6 Ole Miss (2026 Sugar Bowl / College Football Playoff Quarterfinal) ===
CFP Quarterfinal at the Allstate Sugar Bowl
No. 6 Ole Miss Rebels (12–1) vs. No. 3 Georgia Bulldogs (12–1) – Game summary

Quarter	1	2	3	4	Total
No. 6 Rebels	6	6	7	20	39
No. 3 Bulldogs	0	21	3	10	34

at Caesars Superdome • New Orleans, Louisiana

- Date: December 6
- Game time: 8:00 p.m.
- Game weather: n/a (indoor)
- Game attendance: 68,371
- Referee: Jeff Servinski
- TV announcers (ESPN): Sean McDonough (play by play), Greg McElroy (analyst), Molly McGrath and Laura Rutledge (sideline reporters)
- Report: Official report

Game information

First quarter

- (5:47) MISS – Lucas Carneiro 54-yard field goal (Drive: 11 plays, 60 yards, 4:27; Ole Miss 3–0)
- (2:13) MISS – Lucas Carneiro 56-yard field goal (Drive: 7 plays, 42 yards, 2:10; Ole Miss 6–0)

Second quarter

- (13:37) UGA – Gunner Stockton 12-yard run, Peyton Woodring kick (Drive: 7 plays, 75 yards, 3:36; Georgia 7–6)
- (10:33) MISS – Luke Hasz 3-yard pass from Trinidad Chambliss, Two-point run conversion failed (Drive: 8 plays, 75 yards, 3:04; Ole Miss 12–7)
- (4:05) UGA – Gunner Stockton 1-yard run, Peyton Woodring kick (Drive: 12 plays, 75 yards, 6:28; Georgia 14–12)
- (2:34) UGA – Fumble returned 47 yards for touchdown by Daylen Everette, Peyton Woodring kick (Georgia 21–12)

Third quarter

- (4:51) MISS – Kewan Lacy 7-yard run, Lucas Carneiro kick (Drive: 7 plays, 63 yards, 3:42; Georgia 21–19)
- (0:30) UGA – Peyton Woodring 37-yard field goal (Drive: 10 plays, 56 yards, 4:21; Georgia 24–19)

Fourth quarter

- (11:29) MISS – Kewan Lacy 5-yard run, (Trinidad Chambliss pass to Harrison Wallace III (Drive: 8 plays, 75 yards, 4:01; Ole Miss 27–24)
- (9:02) MISS – Harrison Wallace III 13-yard pass from Trinidad Chambliss, T Lucas Carneiro kick (Drive: 2 plays, 23 yards, 0:29; Ole Miss 34–24)
- (7:03) UGA – Zachariah Branch 18-yard pass from Gunner Stockton, Peyton Woodring kick (Drive: 6 plays, 75 yards, 1:59; Ole Miss 34–31)
- (0:56) UGA – Peyton Woodring 24-yard field goal (Drive: 12 plays, 58 yards, 4:37; Tied 34–34)
- (0:06) MISS – Lucas Carneiro 47-yard field goal (Drive: 7 plays, 45 yards, 0:50; Ole Miss 37–34)
- (0:01) MISS – Team safety (Ole Miss 39–34)

Statistics	MISS	UGA
First downs	23	23
Plays–yards	73–473	70–343
Rushes–yards	27–111	37–124
Passing yards	362	219
Passing: comp–att–int	30–46–0	19–33–0
Turnovers	1	1
Time of possession	27:28	32:32

Team	Category	Player	Statistics
Ole Miss	Passing	Trinidad Chambliss	30/46, 362 yards, 2 TD
Ole Miss	Rushing	Kewan Lacy	22 carries, 98 yards, 2 TD
Ole Miss	Receiving	Harrison Wallace III	9 receptions, 156 yards, TD
Georgia	Passing	Gunner Stockton	18/31, 203 yards, TD
Georgia	Rushing	Nate Frazier	15 carries, 86 yards
Georgia	Receiving	Zachariah Branch	8 receptions, 67 yards, TD

== Personnel ==
=== Roster ===
2025 Georgia Bulldogs football team roster
Players
Coaches
Offense

Pos.	#	Name	Class
RB	0	Roderick Robinson II	RSo
WR	1	Zachariah Branch	Jr
RB	2	Josh McCray	RSr
RB	3	Nate Frazier	So
TE	4	Oscar Delp	Sr
WR	5	Noah Thomas	Sr
WR	6	CJ Wiley	Fr
TE	7	Lawson Luckie	Jr
WR	8	Colbie Young	Sr
TE	9	Ethan Barbour	Fr
TE	10	Elyiss Williams	Fr
WR	11	Talyn Taylor	Fr
QB	12	Ryan Puglisi	RFr
WR	13	Tyler J. Williams	Fr
QB	14	Gunner Stockton	RJr
QB	15	Ryan Montgomery	Fr
WR	16	London Humphreys	Jr
QB	17	Colter Ginn	RFr
WR	18	Sacovie White-Helton	RFr
QB	19	Hezekiah Millender	Fr
RB	20	Dwight Phillips Jr.	So
TE	23	Jaden Reddell	RFr
RB	24	Bo Walker	Fr
RB	26	Micah Bell	RSo
WR	28	Walter Blanchard	RSo
WR	29	Luke Bennett	RJr
RB	30	Gannon Hearst	RJr
RB	31	Wade Penn	RFr
RB	32	Cash Jones	RSr
RB	33	Chauncey Bowens	RFr
WR	35	Kavon Townsend	RSr
WR	36	Jackson St. Clair	Fr
WR	37	Ben McElreath	Fr
RB	38	Brandon Mathis	RJr
WR	39	Miles Thornton	RJr
TE	41	David Lalaian	RSo
TE	42	Patrick Hester	RJr
WR	46	Danny Curran	RJr
WR	47	Will Taylor	RSo
TE	48	Cooper Johnson	RJr
OL	50	Cortez Smith	Fr
OL	51	Malachi Toliver	RFr
OL	52	Michael Uini	RFr
OL	54	Waltclaire Flynn Jr.	RFr
OL	55	Bo Hughley	RSo
OL	56	Micah Morris	RSr
OL	57	Monroe Freeling	Jr
OL	60	Henry Peagler	RSo
OL	63	Dontrell Glover	Fr
OL	64	Jahzare Jackson	So
OL	65	Dennis Uzochukwu	Fr
OL	70	Daniel Calhoun	RFr
OL	71	Earnest Greene III	RJr
OL	72	Jamal Meriweather	RSo
OL	73	Juan Gaston	Fr
OL	74	Drew Bobo	RJr
OL	75	Mason Short	Fr
OL	76	Marcus Harrison	RFr
OL	78	Tate Nelms	RFr
OL	79	Nyier Daniels	RFr
WR	81	Jeremy Bell	RFr
TE	82	Colton Heinrich	RFr
WR	83	Cole Speer	Sr
WR	84	Landon Roldan	Fr
WR	86	Dillon Bell	Sr
WR	88	Thomas Blackshear	Fr

Defense }

Pos.	#	Name	Class
OLB	0	Gabe Harris Jr.	Jr
CB	1	Ellis Robinson IV	RFr
S	2	Zion Branch	RJr
ILB	3	CJ Allen	Jr
S	4	KJ Bolden	So
ILB	5	Raylen Wilson	Jr
CB	6	Daylen Everette	Sr
CB	7	Daniel Harris	Jr
CB	8	Joenel Aguero	Jr
ILB	9	Chris Cole	So
ILB	10	Zayden Walker	Fr
OLB	11	Darren Ikinnagbon	Fr
S	12	Jaden Harris	RJr
ILB	13	AJ Kruah	Fr
S	14	Adrian Maddox	Sr
CB	15	Demello Jones	So
CB	16	Maurice Hayes	RFr
OLB	18	Elo Modozie	Jr
ILB	19	Justin Williams	So
SS	20	JaCorey Thomas	Sr
S	22	Todd Robinson	Fr
CB	23	Ondre Evans	RFr
CB	24	Dominick Kelly	Fr
CB	25	Jontae Gilbert	Fr
S	26	Daniel Okonkwo	Fr
S	27	Rasean Dinkins	Fr
ILB	28	Kris Jones	RFr
DE	29	Isaiah Gibson	Fr
ILB	30	Terrell Foster	RJr
FS	31	Kyron Jones	RSo
CB	32	Jaylan Morgan	Fr
OLB	33	Quintavius Johnson	So
S	35	Jacob Fleming	RJr
DB	37	Henry Waller	RJr
ILB	38	Cole Jones	Fr
DB	41	Denton Shamburger	RJr
DB	43	Ali Hall	RSr
DL	44	Jordan Hall	Jr
ILB	47	Clayton Hood	Fr
OLB	48	Duncan Carpenter	Fr
DL	52	Christen Miller	RJr
ILB	53	Eli Barrow	RSo
DT	55	London Seymour	Fr
DL	67	Clinton Barlow	RSo
DT	81	Josh Horton	RSo
OLB	85	Chase Linton	Fr
DL	88	Nasir Johnson	RFr
DL	90	Elijah Griffin	Fr
DE	91	Justin Greene	RFr
DL	92	Jordan Thomas	RFr
DL	94	Xzavier McLeod	RSo
DL	95	Nnamdi Ogboko	RFr
DL	96	JJ Hanne	Fr
DL	99	Joseph Jonah-Ajonye	RFr

Special teams

Pos.	#	Name	Class
P	17	Drew Miller	RFr
LS	51	Will Snellings	RSo
LS	60	Beau Gardner	RSr
K	91	Peyton Woodring	Jr
P	92	Brett Thorson	Sr
P	93	Carter Horton	RSo
K	94	Henry Bates	RJr
K	96	Liam Badger	RSr
K	98	Connor Ferguson	Fr

Head coach

- Kirby Smart

Coordinators/assistant coaches

- Mike Bobo – Offensive coordinator/quarterbacks
- Glenn Schumann – Defensive coordinator/inside linebackers
- Travaris Robinson – Co-defensive coordinator/safeties
- Kirk Benedict – Special teams coordinator
- Josh Crawford – Running backs
- James Coley - Wide receivers
- Todd Hartley – Assistant head coach/tight ends
- Stacy Searels – Offensive line
- Tray Scott – Defensive line
- Chidera Uzo-Diribe – Outside linebackers
- Donte Williams – Associate head coach/defensive backs
- Andrew Thacker – Nickels/stars

Legend

- (C) Team captain
- (S) Suspended
- (I) Ineligible
- Injured
- Redshirt

Roster
Last update: 08/07/2025

=== Depth chart ===
- Depth chart is a projection and is subject to change.

Defense

NB
Joenel Aguero
Rasean Dinkins
–

FS
JaCorey Thomas
Zion Branch
Adrian Maddox

JACK	MAC	MONEY
Quintavius Johnson	CJ Allen	Raylen Wilson
Elo Modozie	Justin Williams	Chris Cole
Kris Jones	Terrell Foster	Zayden Walker

SS
KJ Bolden
Jaden Harris
–

CB
Ellis Robinson IV
Daniel Harris
Jontae Gilbert

DE	NT	DE
Gabe Harris Jr.	Xzavier McLeod	Christen Miller
Joseph Jonah-Ajonye	Elijah Griffin	Josh Horton
JJ Hanne	Nnamdi Ogboko	Jordan Thomas

CB
Daylen Everette
Demello Jones
Dominick Kelly

Offense

WR-X
Noah Thomas
CJ Wiley
–

WR-Y
Zachariah Branch
Sacovie White-Helton
Landon Roldan

LT	LG	C	RG	RT
Monroe Freeling	Micah Morris	Drew Bobo	Dontrell Glover	Earnest Greene III
Jahzare Jackson	Jamal Meriweather	Malachi Toliver	Juan Gaston	Bo Hughley
–	Daniel Calhoun	Cortez Smith	Michael Uini	Nyier Daniels

TE
Oscar Delp
Lawson Luckie
Elyiss Williams

WR-Z
Dillon Bell
London Humphreys
–

QB
Gunner Stockton
Ryan Puglisi
Ryan Montgomery

Key reserves

Special teams
PK Peyton Woodring
P Brett Thorson
KR Zachariah Branch
PR Zachariah Branch
LS Beau Gardner
H Gunner Stockton

RB
Chauncey Bowens
Nate Frazier
Cash Jones

=== Coaching staff ===
This was coach Kirby Smart's tenth year at Georgia, under contract through 2033, receiving $13 million annually.

Name	Position	Consecutive season at Georgia in current position
Kirby Smart	Head coach	10th
Mike Bobo	Offensive coordinator/Quarterbacks coach	3rd
Glenn Schumann	Defensive coordinator/Inside linebackers coach	7th
Travaris Robinson	Co-Defensive coordinator/Safeties coach	2nd
Kirk Benedict	Special teams coordinator	2nd
Josh Crawford	Running backs coach	2nd
James Coley	Wide receivers coach	2nd
Todd Hartley	Tight ends coach	6th
Stacy Searels	Offensive line coach	4th
Tray Scott	Defensive line coach	8th
Chidera Uzo-Diribe	Outside linebackers coach	3rd
Donte Williams	Defensive backs coach	2nd
Andrew Thacker	Nickelbacks coach	1st
