= 2025 SEC Championship Game =

- Conference Championship
Georgia Bulldogs	Alabama Crimson Tide
(11–1)	(10–2)
28	7
Head coach: Kirby Smart	Head coach: Kalen DeBoer
AP / Coaches / CFP; 3 / 3 / 3	AP / Coaches / CFP; 10 / 10 / 9
	1	2	3	4	Total
Georgia	7	7	7	7	28
Alabama	0	0	0	7	7
- Date: December 6, 2025
- Season: 2025
- Stadium: Mercedes-Benz Stadium
- Location: Atlanta, Georgia
- MVP: Gunner Stockton (QB, Georgia)
- Favorite: Georgia by 2.5
- Referee: Daniel Gautreaux
- Attendance: 77,247

United States TV coverage
- Network: ABC (ESPN+); Westwood One; SEC Radio
- Announcers: ABC: Chris Fowler (play-by-play), Kirk Herbstreit (analyst), Holly Rowe and Laura Rutledge (sideline reporters); Westwood One: Nate Gatter (play-by-play), Derek Rackley (analyst), and Dawn Davenport (sideline); SEC Radio: Dave Neal (play-by-play), Dave Archer (analyst), and Stephen Hartzell (sideline)

International TV coverage
- Network: ESPN Brazil
- Announcers: Andrei Paternostro (play-by-play) and Weinny Eirado (analyst)

2025 Southeastern Conference football standings
	Conf.			Overall
Team	W		L	W		L
No. 9 Alabama y^	7	–	1	11	–	4
No. 6 Georgia y$^	7	–	1	12	–	2
No. 3 Ole Miss ^	7	–	1	13	–	2
No. 8 Texas A&M ^	7	–	1	11	–	2
No. 12 Texas	6	–	2	10	–	3
No. 13 Oklahoma ^	6	–	2	10	–	3
No. 15 Vanderbilt	6	–	2	10	–	3
Tennessee	4	–	4	8	–	5
Missouri	4	–	4	8	–	5
LSU	3	–	5	7	–	6
Kentucky	2	–	6	5	–	7
Florida	2	–	6	4	–	8
South Carolina	1	–	7	4	–	8
Auburn	1	–	7	5	–	7
Mississippi State	1	–	7	5	–	8
Arkansas	0	–	8	2	–	10
Championship: Georgia 28, Alabama 7
^ – College Football Playoff participant; $ – Conference champion; y – Championship game participant; Rankings from AP Poll

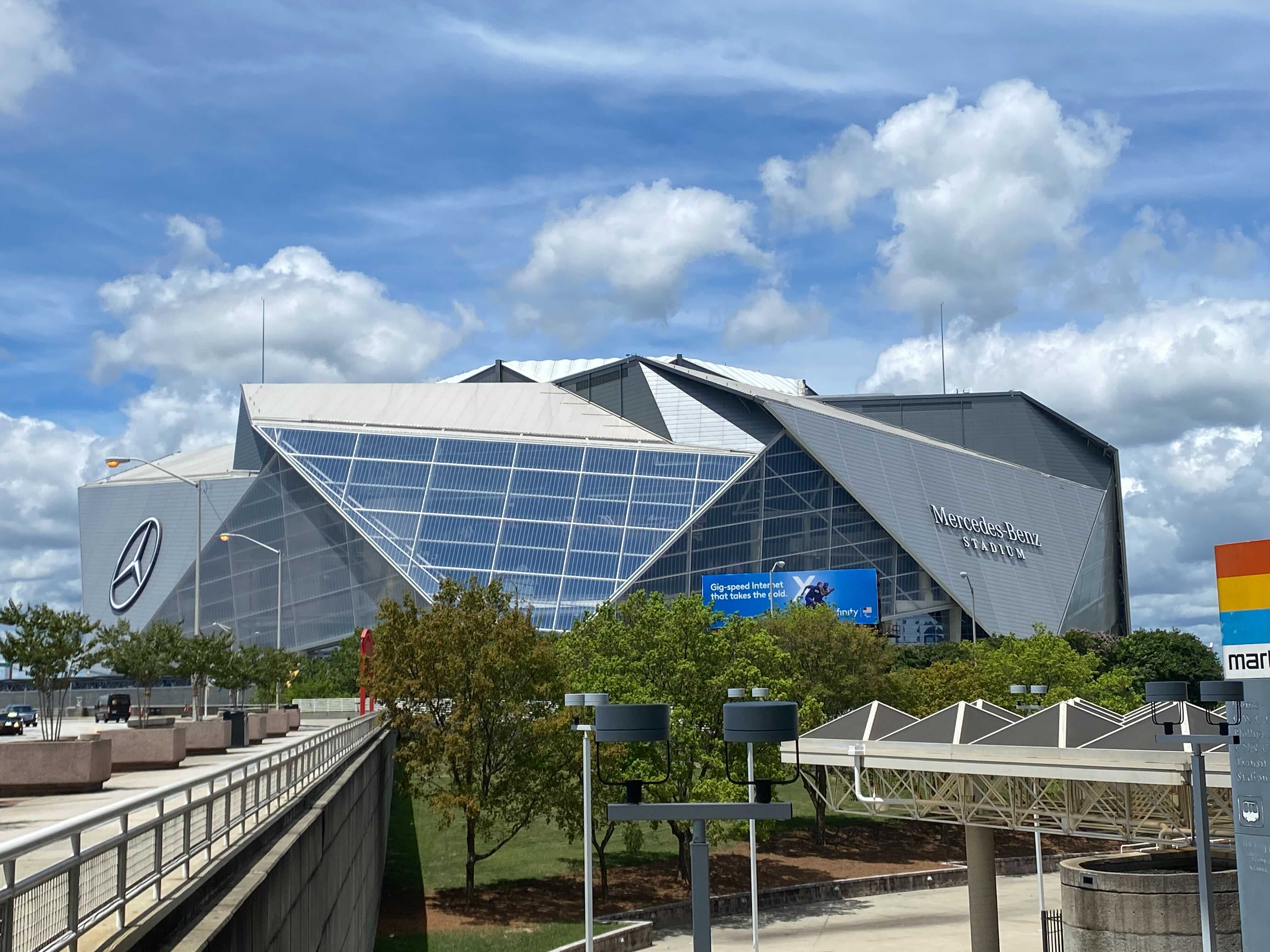
Mercedes-Benz Stadium in Atlanta, Georgia, the site of the SEC Championship Game.

The 2025 SEC Championship Game was a college football game played on December 6, 2025, at Mercedes-Benz Stadium in Atlanta, Georgia. It was the 34th annual SEC Championship Game and determined the conference's champion for the 2025 season. The game featured the Alabama Crimson Tide, the No. 1 seed, and the Georgia Bulldogs, the No. 2 seed. The game began at 4:00 p.m. EST and was broadcast on ABC for the second consecutive year. Georgia defeated Alabama 28–7, earning an automatic bid in the 2025–26 College Football Playoff as one of the top five ranked conference champions.

== Teams ==
The game was a rematch of a regular season game on September 27. Alabama defeated Georgia, 24–21. This was the fifth time Georgia and Alabama played for an SEC Championship, with the Crimson Tide winning each of the previous four meetings in 2012, 2018, 2021, and 2023.

=== Georgia Bulldogs ===
Georgia began the season as the No. 5 ranked team in the AP Poll. The Bulldogs began the season with two wins over nonconference opponents Marshall and Austin Peay before earning their first SEC win of the season on the road against Tennessee. They returned home to face Alabama, losing 24–21, their first loss at home since 2019. The Bulldogs rebounded by soundly defeating Kentucky the following week and then knocking off rival Auburn on the road. They then outlasted Ole Miss 43–35, jumping to No. 5 in the AP Poll entering a bye week. Following the bye week, Georgia defeated rival Florida in Jacksonville and Mississippi State in Starkville. The Bulldogs then returned home for a two-game home stretch including a 35–10 victory over Texas and 35–3 win over Charlotte. In the final game of the regular season, Georgia defeated rival Georgia Tech, 16–9, at Mercedes-Benz Stadium.

The Bulldogs clinched a spot in the game following Texas's 27–17 victory over Texas A&M on November 28. This was their fifth consecutive SEC Championship Game appearance and their 13th overall.

=== Alabama Crimson Tide ===
Alabama began the season as the No. 8 ranked team in both the AP and Coaches Polls. In the first game of the season, the Crimson Tide were upset on the road against Florida State, losing 31–17. They responded with resounding victories over Louisiana–Monroe and Wisconsin before heading to Sanford Stadium to face Georgia. The Crimson Tide knocked off the Bulldogs 24–21, jumping up to No. 10 in the AP Poll. Alabama then preceded to defeat three consecutive ranked opponents, earning victories over Vanderbilt, Missouri, and rival Tennessee. The Crimson Tide defeated South Carolina 29–22 before a bye week. After the bye week, Alabama beat rival LSU before a matchup against Oklahoma at home. The Sooners took down Alabama, 23–21, dropping the Crimson Tide to No. 10 in the CFP rankings. The Crimson Tide rebounded following the loss, with two straight wins to end the regular season, defeating Eastern Illinois and Auburn.

The Crimson Tide clinched a spot in the game following their victory in the Iron Bowl on November 29. This was their 16th SEC Championship Game and first under head coach Kalen DeBoer, with their previous appearance coming in 2023 where they defeated Georgia 27–24 under former head coach Nick Saban for his final career win.

== Scoring summary ==
2025 SEC Championship Game

Quarter	1	2	3	4	Total
No. 3 Georgia	7	7	7	7	28
No. 9 Alabama	0	0	0	7	7

at Mercedes-Benz Stadium • Atlanta, Georgia

- Date: December 6, 2025
- Game time: 4:00 p.m.
- Game attendance: 77,247
- TV announcers (ABC): Chris Fowler (play-by-play), Kirk Herbstreit (analyst), Holly Rowe and Laura Rutledge (sideline reporters)

Game information

First quarter

- (4:36) UGA – Roderick Robinson II 1 yard pass from Gunner Stockton, Peyton Woodring kick (Drive: 4 plays, 21 yards, 1:55; Georgia 7–0)

Second quarter

- (8:43) UGA – Dillon Bell 5-yard pass from Gunner Stockton, Peyton Woodring kick (Drive: 14 plays, 57 yards, 7:44; Georgia 14–0)

Third quarter

- (10:47) UGA – Nate Frazier 9-yard run, Peyton Woodring kick (Drive: 6 plays, 40 yards, 2:32; Georgia 21–0)

Fourth quarter

- (12:33) ALA – Germie Bernard 23-yard pass from Ty Simpson, Conor Talty kick (Drive: 9 plays, 91 yards, 2:37; Georgia 21–7)
- (6:51) UGA – Zachariah Branch 13-yard pass from Gunner Stockton, Peyton Woodring kick (Drive: 3 plays, 12 yards, 1:22; Georgia 28–7)

=== Statistics ===
Statistics	UGA	ALA
First downs	16	11
Plays–yards	67–297	55–209
Rushes–yards	41–141	16–(-3)
Passing yards	156	212
Passing: comp–att–int	20–26–0	19–39–1
Turnovers	0	1
Time of possession	36:52	23:08

Team	Category	Player	Statistics
Georgia	Passing	Gunner Stockton	20/26, 156 yards, 3 TD
Georgia	Rushing	Nate Frazier	13 carries, 52 yards, 1 TD
Georgia	Receiving	Zachariah Branch	5 receptions, 53 yards, 1 TD
Alabama	Passing	Ty Simpson	19/39, 212 yards, 1 TD, 1 INT
Alabama	Rushing	Daniel Hill	4 carries, 11 yards
Alabama	Receiving	Germie Bernard	6 receptions, 62 yards, 1 TD
