= Noah Thomas (American football) =

American football player (born 2004)

No. 17 – Cincinnati Bengals
- Position: Wide receiver
- Roster status: Practice squad

Personal information
- Born: January 13, 2004 (age 22)
- Listed height: 6 ft 5 in (1.96 m)
- Listed weight: 203 lb (92 kg)

Career information
- High school: Clear Springs (League City, Texas)
- College: Texas A&M (2022–2024); Georgia (2025)
- NFL draft: 2026: undrafted

Career history
- Cincinnati Bengals (2026–present)*
- * Offseason or practice squad member only
- Stats at Pro Football Reference

Noah Thomas (born January 13, 2004) is an American professional football wide receiver for the Cincinnati Bengals of the National Football League (NFL). He played college football for the Texas A&M Aggies and Georgia Bulldogs.

== Early life ==
Thomas grew up in Pearland, Texas and attended Clear Springs High School. He had 63 catches 935 yards and 21 touchdowns as a senior. Thomas was rated a four-star recruit and committed to play college football at Texas A&M over offers from Arkansas, Arizona State, Baylor, and Notre Dame.

== College career ==
=== Texas A&M ===
Thomas played in 11 games with four starts during his freshman season with the Texas A&M Aggies and caught five passes for 51 yards and two touchdowns. In the first game of his sophomore season, he had six receptions for 74 yards and three touchdowns in a 52–10 win against New Mexico.

=== Georgia ===
On January 7, 2025, Thomas announced his decision to transfer to the University of Georgia to play for the Georgia Bulldogs.

=== College statistics ===
Year	Team	GP	Receiving			
Year	Team	GP	Rec	Yds	Avg	TD
2022	Texas A&M	11	5	51	10.2	2
2023	Texas A&M	11	29	359	12.4	5
2024	Texas A&M	13	39	574	14.7	8
2025	Georgia	10	16	264	15.9	4
Career		45	89	1240	13.5	19

== Professional career ==
Pre-draft measurables
Height	Weight	Arm length	Hand span	Wingspan	40-yard dash	10-yard split	20-yard split	20-yard shuttle	Three-cone drill	Vertical jump	Broad jump
6 ft 4 7/8 in (1.95 m)	203 lb (92 kg)	33 1/4 in (0.84 m)	9 1/4 in (0.23 m)	6 ft 7 7/8 in (2.03 m)	4.60 s	1.61 s	2.64 s	4.40 s	7.28 s	31.0 in (0.79 m)	9 ft 11 in (3.02 m)
All values from Pro Day

On May 8, 2026, Thomas signed with the Cincinnati Bengals as an undrafted free agent. On August 30, Thomas was waived by Cincinnati as a part of final roster cuts; he was re-signed to the team's practice squad the next day.

== Personal life ==
Thomas is the nephew of former NFL linebacker Broderick Thomas and the great-nephew of Pro Football Hall of Fame linebacker and former San Francisco 49ers head coach Mike Singletary.
