= Chauncey Bowens =

American football player (born 2006)

No. 5 – Georgia Bulldogs
- Position: Running back
- Class: Junior

Personal information
- Born: July 3, 2006 (age 20)
- Listed height: 5 ft 11 in (1.80 m)
- Listed weight: 225 lb (102 kg)

Career information
- High school: The Benjamin School (Palm Beach Gardens, Florida)
- College: Georgia (2024–present)
- Stats at ESPN

Chauncey Bowens (born July 3, 2006) is an American college football running back for the Georgia Bulldogs of the Southeastern Conference (SEC).

== Early life ==
Bowens attended The Benjamin School in Palm Beach Gardens, Florida. As a senior, he rushed for 842 yards and ten touchdowns. A four-star recruit, Bowens was originally committed to Florida, but he flipped his commitment to the University of Georgia.

== College career ==
Bowens played sparingly in 2024, recording 16 carries for 58 yards, while earning a redshirt. His playing time increased the following season, rushing for his first two career touchdowns against Austin Peay.

=== Statistics ===
College statistics
Season	Team	Games	Rushing				Receiving			
Season	Team	GP	Att	Yards	Avg	TD	Rec	Yards	Avg	TD
2024	Georgia	4	16	58	3.6	0	–	–	–	–
2025	Georgia	12	103	526	5.1	6	14	82	5.9	0
2026	Georgia	6	36	129	3.6	7	10	132	13.2	1
Career		22	155	713	4.6	13	24	214	8.9	1
