= Zachariah Branch =

American football player (born 2004)

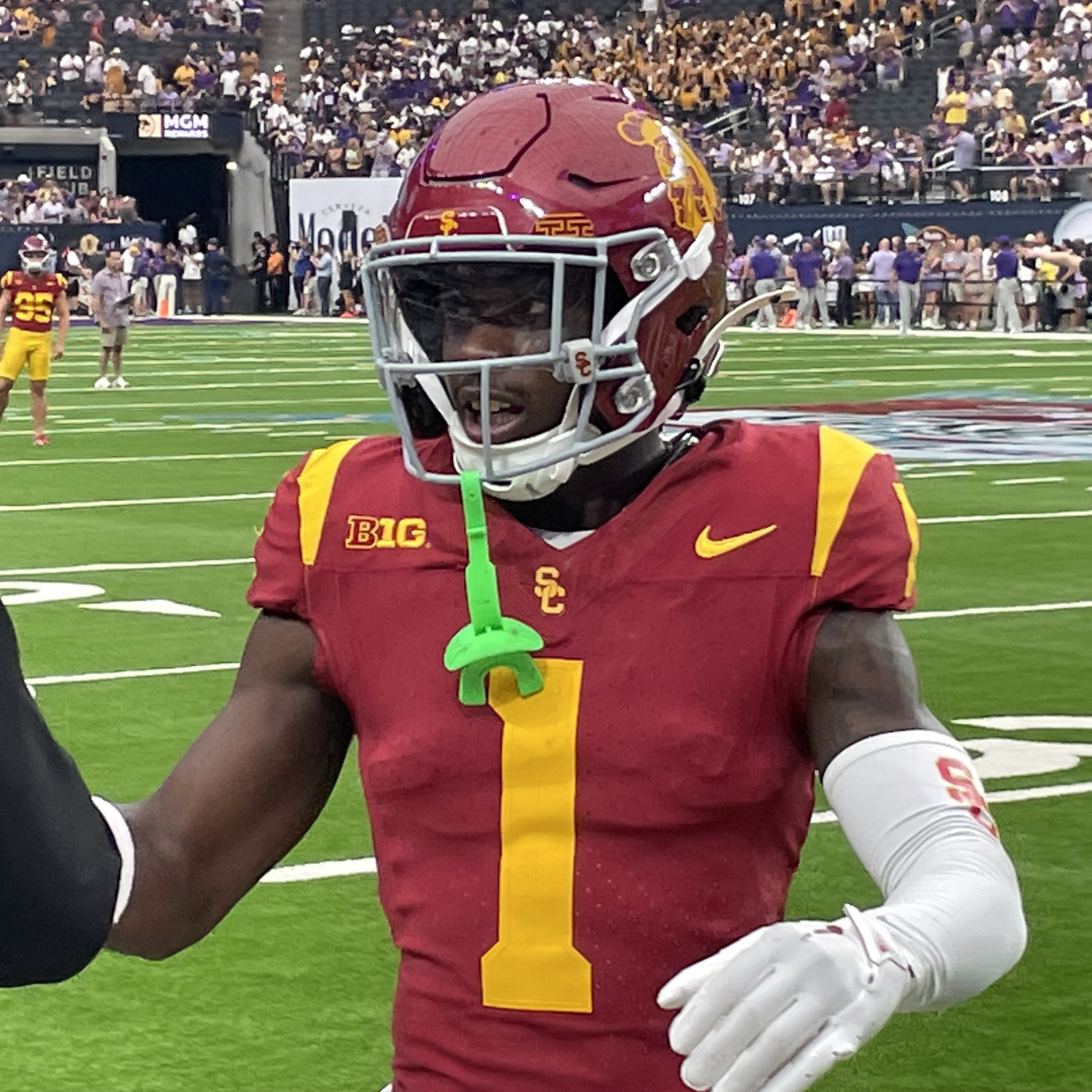

No. 17 – Atlanta Falcons
- Positions: Wide receiver, kick returner
- Roster status: Active

Personal information
- Born: March 29, 2004 (age 22)
- Listed height: 5 ft 9 in (1.75 m)
- Listed weight: 177 lb (80 kg)

Career information
- High school: Bishop Gorman (Las Vegas, Nevada)
- College: USC (2023–2024); Georgia (2025)
- NFL draft: 2026: 3rd round, 79th overall pick

Career history
- Atlanta Falcons (2026–present)

Awards and highlights
- Jet Award (2023); First-team All-American (2023); First-team All-Pac-12 (2023); Second-team All-SEC (2025)

Career NFL statistics as of Week 9, 2026
- Receptions: 10
- Receiving yards: 64
- Return yards: 374
- Stats at Pro Football Reference

Zachariah Eric Branch (born March 29, 2004) is an American professional football wide receiver and kick returner for the Atlanta Falcons of the National Football League (NFL). He played college football for the USC Trojans and the Georgia Bulldogs and was selected by the Falcons in the third round of the 2026 NFL draft.

== Early life ==
Branch was born on March 29, 2004, the youngest of two sons to Sheve and Renee Branch. Branch Welcomed a Son in June named Zachariah Branch Jr. His father is a sports performance coach. Branch and his brother grew up attending USC football games. Branch was raised in Las Vegas and attended Bishop Gorman High School. He was one of the top players in the 2023 college football recruiting class, ranked No. 6 nationally by ESPN and No. 9 by 247Sports. He was the top wide receiver in the class.

== College career ==
=== USC ===
Branch enrolled at the University of Southern California in early 2023. In June 2023, he was recorded on a treadmill sprint at 26 miles per hour, close to Usain Bolt's top speed. Prior to the start of the 2023 season, he was selected by 247Sports as a true freshman preseason All-American. In his college football debut, Branch tallied 232 all-purpose yards, including his first touchdown reception and a 96-yard kickoff return. Following his first game, the Los Angeles Times wrote that his "feats had even his opponents in awe", and his speed and ability to change direction drew comparisons to Reggie Bush.

In December 2024, Branch entered the transfer portal.

=== Georgia ===
On January 5, 2025, Branch announced his decision to transfer to the University of Georgia to play for the Georgia Bulldogs, alongside his brother, Zion Branch.

=== Statistics ===
College statistics
| Year | Team | GP | Receiving | | | | Rushing | | | | Kick returns | | | | Punt returns | | | |
| Year | Team | GP | Rec | Yards | Avg | TD | Att | Yards | Avg | TD | Ret | Yards | Avg | TD | Ret | Yards | Avg | TD |
|---|---|---|---|---|---|---|---|---|---|---|---|---|---|---|---|---|---|---|
| 2023 | USC | 11 | 31 | 320 | 10.3 | 2 | 9 | 70 | 7.8 | 1 | 24 | 442 | 18.4 | 1 | 16 | 332 | 20.8 | 1 |
| 2024 | USC | 12 | 47 | 503 | 10.7 | 1 | 2 | 17 | 8.5 | 0 | 5 | 105 | 21.0 | 0 | 13 | 74 | 5.7 | 0 |
| 2025 | Georgia | 13 | 73 | 744 | 10.2 | 5 | 4 | 7 | 1.8 | 0 | 10 | 205 | 20.5 | 0 | 13 | 157 | 12.1 | 0 |
| Career | | 36 | 151 | 1567 | 10.4 | 8 | 15 | 94 | 6.3 | 1 | 39 | 752 | 19.3 | 1 | 42 | 563 | 13.4 | 1 |

== Professional career ==
Pre-draft measurables
| Height | Weight | Arm length | Hand span | Wingspan | 40-yard dash | 10-yard split | 20-yard split | Vertical jump | Broad jump | Bench press |
|---|---|---|---|---|---|---|---|---|---|---|
| 5 ft 8 5/8 in (1.74 m) | 177 lb (80 kg) | 29 3/8 in (0.75 m) | 9 in (0.23 m) | 6 ft 0 3/8 in (1.84 m) | 4.35 s | 1.50 s | 2.52 s | 38.0 in (0.97 m) | 10 ft 5 in (3.18 m) | 20 reps |
All values from NFL Combine

Branch was selected in third round, 79th overall by the Atlanta Falcons in the 2026 NFL draft.

== Personal life ==
Branch is a great–nephew of Cliff Branch, a Hall of Fame wide receiver who won Super Bowls XI, XV, and XVIII with the Oakland / Los Angeles Raiders.

On April 19, 2026, Branch was arrested in Athens, Georgia on two charges of obstruction; the charges stemmed from an incident in which Branch allegedly blocked a public sidewalk and failed to follow instructions from law enforcement. On June 3, it was announced that the charges against Branch had been dropped.
