= 2025 NCAA Division I FBS football rankings =

- Season: 2025
- Bowl season: 2025–26 bowl games
- Preseason No. 1: Texas
- End of season champions: Indiana
- Conference with most teams in final AP poll: SEC (7)

Two human polls and a committee's selections comprise the 2025 National Collegiate Athletic Association (NCAA) Division I Football Bowl Subdivision (FBS) football rankings, in addition to various publications' preseason polls. Unlike most sports, college football's governing body, the NCAA, does not bestow a national championship at the FBS level. Instead, that title is bestowed by one or more different polling agencies. There are two main weekly polls that begin in the preseason—the AP poll and the Coaches Poll. One additional poll, the College Football Playoff (CFP) ranking, is usually released starting midway through the season. The CFP rankings determine who makes the twelve-team playoff that determines the College Football Playoff National Champion.

== Legend ==
	Increase in ranking
	Decrease in ranking
	Not ranked previous week
	Selected for College Football Playoff
(#–#)	Win–loss record
(Italics)	Number of first place votes

== AP poll ==
	Preseason Aug 11	Week 1 Sep 2	Week 2 Sep 7	Week 3 Sep 14	Week 4 Sep 21	Week 5 Sep 28	Week 6 Oct 5	Week 7 Oct 12	Week 8 Oct 19	Week 9 Oct 26	Week 10 Nov 2	Week 11 Nov 9	Week 12 Nov 16	Week 13 Nov 23	Week 14 Nov 30	Week 15 Dec 7	Week 16 (Final) Jan 20	
1.	Texas (25)	Ohio State (1–0) (55)	Ohio State (2–0) (57)	Ohio State (3–0) (55)	Ohio State (3–0) (52)	Ohio State (4–0) (46)	Ohio State (5–0) (40)	Ohio State (6–0) (50)	Ohio State (7–0) (60)	Ohio State (7–0) (54)	Ohio State (8–0) (54)	Ohio State (9–0) (55)	Ohio State (10–0) (57)	Ohio State (11–0) (58)	Ohio State (12–0) (61)	Indiana (13–0) (66)	Indiana (16–0) (66)	1.
2.	Penn State (23)	Penn State (1–0) (7)	Penn State (2–0) (5)	Penn State (3–0) (5)	Miami (FL) (4–0) (7)	Oregon (5–0) (16)	Miami (FL) (5–0) (21)	Miami (FL) (5–0) (13)	Indiana (7–0) (6)	Indiana (8–0) (11)	Indiana (9–0) (11)	Indiana (10–0) (6)	Indiana (11–0) (8)	Indiana (11–0) (7)	Indiana (12–0) (5)	Georgia (12–1)	Miami (FL) (13–3)	2.
3.	Ohio State (11)	LSU (1–0) (3)	LSU (2–0) (2)	LSU (3–0) (2)	Penn State (3–0) (5)	Miami (FL) (4–0) (4)	Oregon (5–0) (5)	Indiana (6–0) (3)	Texas A&M (7–0)	Texas A&M (8–0) (1)	Texas A&M (8–0) (1)	Texas A&M (9–0) (4)	Texas A&M (10–0) (1)	Texas A&M (11–0) (1)	Georgia (11–1)	Ohio State (12–1)	Ole Miss (13–2)	3.
4.	Clemson (4)	Georgia (1–0)	Oregon (2–0) (1)	Miami (FL) (3–0) (3)	LSU (4–0)	Ole Miss (5–0)	Ole Miss (5–0)	Texas A&M (6–0)	Alabama (6–1)	Alabama (7–1)	Alabama (7–1)	Alabama (8–1)	Georgia (9–1)	Georgia (10–1)	Oregon (11–1)	Texas Tech (12–1)	Oregon (13–2)	4.
5.	Georgia (1)	Miami (FL) (1–0)	Miami (FL) (2–0)	Georgia (3–0)	Georgia (3–0)	Oklahoma (4–0)	Texas A&M (5–0)	Ole Miss (6–0)	Georgia (6–1)	Georgia (6–1)	Georgia (7–1)	Georgia (8–1)	Ole Miss (10–1)	Oregon (10–1)	Texas Tech (11–1)	Oregon (11–1)	Ohio State (12–2)	5.
6.	Notre Dame	Oregon (1–0) (1)	Georgia (2–0)	Oregon (3–0) (1)	Oregon (4–0) (1)	Texas A&M (4–0)	Oklahoma (5–0)	Alabama (5–1)	Oregon (6–1)	Oregon (7–1)	Oregon (7–1)	Ole Miss (9–1)	Oregon (9–1) т	Ole Miss (10–1)	Ole Miss (11–1)	Ole Miss (11–1)	Georgia (12–2)	6.
7.	Oregon (1)	Texas (0–1)	Texas (1–1)	Florida State (2–0)	Oklahoma (4–0) (1)	Penn State (3–1)	Indiana (5–0)	Texas Tech (6–0)	Georgia Tech (7–0)	Ole Miss (7–1)	Ole Miss (8–1)	Oregon (8–1)	Texas Tech (10–1) т	Texas Tech (10–1)	Texas A&M (11–1)	Texas A&M (11–1)	Texas Tech (12–2)	7.
8.	Alabama	Clemson (0–1)	Notre Dame (0–1)	Texas (2–1)	Florida State (3–0)	Indiana (5–0)	Alabama (4–1)	Oregon (5–1)	Ole Miss (6–1)	Georgia Tech (8–0)	BYU (8–0)	Texas Tech (9–1)	Oklahoma (8–2)	Oklahoma (9–2)	Oklahoma (10–2)	Oklahoma (10–2)	Texas A&M (11–2)	8.
9.	LSU	Notre Dame (0–1)	Illinois (2–0)	Illinois (3–0)	Texas A&M (3–0)	Texas (3–1)	Texas Tech (5–0)	Georgia (5–1)	Miami (FL) (5–1)	Vanderbilt (7–1)	Texas Tech (8–1)	Notre Dame (7–2)	Notre Dame (8–2)	Notre Dame (9–2)	Notre Dame (10–2)	Notre Dame (10–2)	Alabama (11–4)	9.
10.	Miami (FL)	South Carolina (1–0)	Florida State (2–0)	Texas A&M (3–0)	Texas (3–1)	Alabama (3–1)	Georgia (4–1)	LSU (5–1)	Vanderbilt (6–1)	BYU (8–0) т	Notre Dame (6–2)	Texas (7–2)	Alabama (8–2)	Alabama (9–2)	Alabama (10–2)	Miami (FL) (10–2)	Notre Dame (10–2)	10.
11.	Arizona State	Illinois (1–0)	South Carolina (2–0)	Oklahoma (3–0)	Indiana (4–0)	Texas Tech (4–0)	LSU (4–1)	Tennessee (5–1)	BYU (7–0)	Miami (FL) (6–1) т	Oklahoma (7–2)	Oklahoma (7–2)	BYU (9–1)	BYU (10–1)	BYU (11–1)	Alabama (10–3)	BYU (12–2)	11.
12.	Illinois	Arizona State (1–0)	Clemson (1–1)	Iowa State (4–0)	Texas Tech (4–0)	Georgia (3–1)	Tennessee (4–1)	Georgia Tech (6–0)	Notre Dame (5–2)	Notre Dame (5–2)	Virginia (8–1)	BYU (8–1)	Vanderbilt (8–2)	Vanderbilt (9–2)	Miami (FL) (10–2)	BYU (11–2)	Texas (10–3)	12.
13.	South Carolina	Florida (1–0)	Oklahoma (2–0)	Ole Miss (3–0)	Ole Miss (4–0)	LSU (4–1)	Georgia Tech (5–0)	Notre Dame (4–2)	Oklahoma (6–1)	Texas Tech (7–1)	Texas (7–2)	Vanderbilt (8–2)	Utah (8–2)	Miami (FL) (9–2)	Vanderbilt (10–2)	Vanderbilt (10–2)	Oklahoma (10–3)	13.
14.	Michigan	Florida State (1–0)	Iowa State (3–0)	Alabama (2–1)	Iowa State (4–0)	Iowa State (5–0)	Missouri (5–0)	Oklahoma (5–1)	Texas Tech (6–1)	Tennessee (6–2)	Louisville (7–1)	Georgia Tech (8–1)	Miami (FL) (8–2)	Utah (9–2)	Texas (9–3)	Texas (9–3)	Utah (11–2)	14.
15.	Florida	Michigan (1–0)	Tennessee (2–0)	Tennessee (2–1)	Tennessee (3–1)	Tennessee (4–1)	Michigan (4–1)	BYU (6–0)	Missouri (6–1)	Virginia (7–1)	Vanderbilt (7–2)	Utah (7–2)	Georgia Tech (9–1)	Michigan (9–2)	Utah (10–2)	Utah (10–2)	Vanderbilt (10–3)	15.
16.	SMU	Iowa State (2–0)	Texas A&M (2–0)	Utah (3–0)	Georgia Tech (4–0)	Vanderbilt (5–0)	Notre Dame (3–2)	Missouri (5–1)	Virginia (6–1)	Louisville (6–1)	Georgia Tech (8–1)	Miami (FL) (7–2)	USC (8–2)	Texas (8–3)	Virginia (10–2)	USC (9–3)	Virginia (11–3)	16.
17.	Kansas State	SMU (1–0)	Ole Miss (2–0)	Texas Tech (3–0)	Alabama (2–1)	Georgia Tech (5–0)	Illinois (5–1)	Vanderbilt (5–1)	Tennessee (5–2)	Cincinnati (7–1)	Utah (7–2)	USC (7–2)	Texas (7–3)	Virginia (9–2)	USC (9–3)	Tulane (11–2)	Iowa (9–4)	17.
18.	Oklahoma	Oklahoma (1–0)	South Florida (2–0)	Georgia Tech (3–0)	Vanderbilt (4–0)	Florida State (3–1)	BYU (5–0)	Virginia (5–1)	South Florida (6–1)	Oklahoma (6–2)	Miami (FL) (6–2)	Michigan (7–2)	Michigan (8–2)	Tennessee (8–3)	Michigan (9–3)	Michigan (9–3)	Tulane (11–3)	18.
19.	Texas A&M	Texas A&M (1–0)	Alabama (1–1)	Indiana (3–0)	Michigan (3–1)	Missouri (5–0)	Virginia (5–1)	South Florida (5–1)	Louisville (5–1)	Missouri (6–2)	Missouri (6–2)	Louisville (7–2)	Virginia (9–2)	USC (8–3)	James Madison (11–1)	James Madison (12–1)	James Madison (12–2)	19.
20.	Indiana	Ole Miss (1–0)	Utah (2–0)	Vanderbilt (3–0)	Missouri (4–0)	Michigan (3–1)	Vanderbilt (5–1)	USC (5–1)	LSU (5–2)	Texas (6–2)	USC (6–2)	Virginia (8–2)	Tennessee (7–3)	James Madison (10–1)	North Texas (11–1)	Virginia (10–3)	USC (9–4)	20.
21.	Ole Miss	Alabama (0–1)	Texas Tech (2–0)	Michigan (2–1)	USC (4–0)	Notre Dame (2–2)	Arizona State (4–1)	Texas (4–2)	Cincinnati (6–1)	Michigan (6–2)	Michigan (7–2)	Tennessee (6–3)	James Madison (9–1)	North Texas (10–1)	Tulane (10–2)	Arizona (9–3)	Michigan (9–4)	21.
22.	Iowa State	Tennessee (1–0)	Indiana (2–0)	Auburn (3–0)	Notre Dame (1–2)	Illinois (4–1)	Iowa State (5–1)	Memphis (6–0)	Texas (5–2)	Houston (7–1)	Memphis (8–1)	Cincinnati (7–2)	North Texas (9–1)	Tulane (9–2)	Arizona (9–3)	Navy (9–2)	Houston (10–3)	22.
23.	Texas Tech	Indiana (1–0)	Michigan (1–1)	Missouri (3–0)	Illinois (3–1)	BYU (4–0)	Memphis (6–0)	Utah (5–1)	Illinois (5–2)	USC (5–2)	Tennessee (6–3)	Pittsburgh (7–2)	Missouri (7–3)	Georgia Tech (9–2)	Navy (9–2)	North Texas (11–2)	Navy (11–2)	23.
24.	Tennessee	Texas Tech (1–0)	Auburn (2–0)	Notre Dame (0–2)	TCU (3–0)	Virginia (4–1)	South Florida (4–1)	Cincinnati (5–1)	Arizona State (5–2)	Utah (6–2)	Washington (6–2)	James Madison (8–1)	Tulane (8–2)	Pittsburgh (8–3)	Georgia Tech (9–3)	Georgia Tech (9–3)	North Texas (12–2)	24.
25.	Boise State	Utah (1–0)	Missouri (2–0)	USC (3–0)	BYU (3–0)	Arizona State (4–1)	Florida State (3–2)	Nebraska (5–1)	Michigan (5–2)	Memphis (7–1)	Cincinnati (7–2)	South Florida (7–2)	Houston (8–2)	SMU (8–3)	Missouri (8–4)	Missouri (8–4)	TCU (9–4)	25.
	Preseason Aug 11	Week 1 Sep 2	Week 2 Sep 7	Week 3 Sep 14	Week 4 Sep 21	Week 5 Sep 28	Week 6 Oct 5	Week 7 Oct 12	Week 8 Oct 19	Week 9 Oct 26	Week 10 Nov 2	Week 11 Nov 9	Week 12 Nov 16	Week 13 Nov 23	Week 14 Nov 30	Week 15 Dec 7	Week 16 (Final) Jan 20	
		Dropped: Kansas State (1–1); Boise State (0–1)	Dropped: Arizona State (1–1); Florida (1–1); SMU (1–1)	Dropped: South Carolina (2–1); Clemson (1–2); South Florida (2–1)	Dropped: Utah (3–1); Auburn (3–1)	Dropped: USC (4–1); TCU (3–1)	Dropped: Penn State (3–2); Texas (3–2)	Dropped: Michigan (4–2); Illinois (5–2); Arizona State (4–2); Iowa State (5–2); Florida State (3–3)	Dropped: USC (5–2); Memphis (6–1); Utah (5–2); Nebraska (5–2)	Dropped: South Florida (6–2); LSU (5–3); Illinois (5–3); Arizona State (5–3)	Dropped: Houston (7–2)	Dropped: Missouri (6–3); Memphis (8–2); Washington (6–3)	Dropped: Louisville (7–3); Cincinnati (7–3); Pittsburgh (7–3); South Florida (7–3)	Dropped: Missouri (7–4); Houston (8–3)	Dropped: Tennessee (8–4); Pittsburgh (8–4); SMU (8–4)	None	Dropped: Arizona (9–4); Georgia Tech (9–4); Missouri (8–5)	

== Coaches Poll ==
	Preseason Aug 4	Week 1 Sep 2	Week 2 Sep 7	Week 3 Sep 14	Week 4 Sep 21	Week 5 Sep 28	Week 6 Oct 5	Week 7 Oct 12	Week 8 Oct 19	Week 9 Oct 26	Week 10 Nov 2	Week 11 Nov 9	Week 12 Nov 16	Week 13 Nov 23	Week 14 Nov 30	Week 15 Dec 7	Week 16 (Final) Jan 20	
1.	Texas (28)	Ohio State (1–0) (59)	Ohio State (2–0) (62)	Ohio State (3–0) (62)	Ohio State (3–0) (61)	Ohio State (4–0) (58)	Ohio State (5–0) (59)	Ohio State (6–0) (63)	Ohio State (7–0) (65)	Ohio State (7–0) (62)	Ohio State (8–0) (60)	Ohio State (9–0) (59)	Ohio State (10–0) (61)	Ohio State (11–0) (61)	Ohio State (12–0) (63)	Indiana (13–0) (61)	Indiana (16–0) (62)	1.
2.	Ohio State (20)	Penn State (1–0) (6)	Penn State (2–0) (4)	Penn State (3–0) (3)	Penn State (3–0) (3)	Oregon (5–0) (6)	Oregon (5–0) (3)	Miami (FL) (5–0) (2)	Indiana (7–0)	Indiana (8–0)	Indiana (9–0) (1)	Indiana (10–0)	Indiana (11–0)	Indiana (11–0)	Indiana (12–0)	Georgia (12–1) (1)	Miami (FL) (13–3)	2.
3.	Penn State (14)	Georgia (1–0) (1)	Georgia (2–0)	Georgia (3–0) (1)	Georgia (3–0) (1)	Miami (FL) (4–0) (1)	Miami (FL) (5–0) (3)	Indiana (6–0) (1)	Texas A&M (7–0)	Texas A&M (8–0) (2)	Texas A&M (8–0) (3)	Texas A&M (9–0) (4)	Texas A&M (10–0) (2)	Texas A&M (11–0) (2)	Georgia (11–1)	Ohio State (12–1)	Ole Miss (13–2)	3.
4.	Georgia (3)	LSU (1–0) (1)	LSU (2–0) (1)	LSU (3–0) (1)	LSU (4–0)	Ole Miss (5–0)	Ole Miss (5–0)	Texas A&M (6–0)	Alabama (6–1)	Alabama (7–1)	Alabama (7–1)	Alabama (8–1)	Georgia (9–1)	Georgia (10–1)	Oregon (11–1)	Texas Tech (12–1)	Oregon (13–2)	4.
5.	Notre Dame	Oregon (1–0)	Oregon (2–0)	Oregon (3–0)	Oregon (4–0) (1)	Texas A&M (4–0)	Texas A&M (5–0) (1)	Ole Miss (6–0)	Georgia (6–1)	Georgia (6–1)	Georgia (7–1)	Georgia (8–1)	Oregon (9–1)	Oregon (10–1)	Ole Miss (11–1)	Oregon (11–1)	Georgia (12–2)	5.
6.	Clemson (2)	Texas (0–1)	Miami (FL) (2–0)	Miami (FL) (3–0)	Miami (FL) (4–0) (1)	Penn State (3–1)	Oklahoma (5–0)	Alabama (5–1)	Oregon (6–1)	Oregon (7–1)	Oregon (7–1)	Oregon (8–1)	Ole Miss (10–1)	Ole Miss (10–1)	Texas Tech (11–1)	Ole Miss (11–1)	Ohio State (12–2)	6.
7.	Oregon	Miami (FL) (1–0)	Texas (1–1)	Texas (2–1)	Texas (3–1)	Texas (3–1)	Indiana (5–0)	Georgia (5–1)	Georgia Tech (7–0)	Georgia Tech (8–0)	Ole Miss (8–1)	Ole Miss (9–1)	Texas Tech (10–1)	Texas Tech (10–1)	Texas A&M (11–1)	Texas A&M (11–1)	Texas Tech (12–2)	7.
8.	Alabama	Clemson (0–1)	Notre Dame (0–1)	Illinois (3–0)	Florida State (3–0)	Oklahoma (4–0)	Alabama (4–1)	Texas Tech (6–0)	Ole Miss (6–1)	Ole Miss (7–1)	BYU (8–0)	Texas Tech (9–1)	Oklahoma (8–2)	Oklahoma (9–2)	Oklahoma (10–2)	Oklahoma (10–2)	Texas A&M (11–2)	8.
9.	LSU	Notre Dame (0–1)	Illinois (2–0)	Florida State (2–0)	Texas A&M (3–0)	Indiana (5–0)	Georgia (4–1)	Oregon (5–1)	Miami (FL) (5–1)	Miami (FL) (6–1)	Texas Tech (8–1)	Notre Dame (7–2)	Notre Dame (8–2)	Notre Dame (9–2)	Notre Dame (10–2)	Notre Dame (10–2)	Alabama (11–4)	9.
10.	Miami (FL)	Arizona State (1–0)	South Carolina (2–0)	Texas A&M (3–0)	Oklahoma (4–0)	Georgia (3–1)	Texas Tech (5–0)	LSU (5–1)	BYU (7–0)	BYU (8–0)	Notre Dame (6–2)	Texas (7–2) т	Alabama (8–2)	Alabama (9–2)	Alabama (10–2)	Miami (FL) (10–2)	Oklahoma (10–3)	10.
11.	Arizona State	South Carolina (1–0)	Clemson (1–1)	Ole Miss (3–0)	Ole Miss (4–0)	Alabama (3–1)	LSU (4–1)	Tennessee (5–1)	Oklahoma (6–1)	Vanderbilt (7–1)	Virginia (8–1)	Oklahoma (7–2) т	BYU (9–1)	BYU (10–1)	BYU (11–1)	Alabama (10–3)	Notre Dame (10–2)	11.
12.	Illinois	Illinois (1–0)	Florida State (2–0)	Oklahoma (3–0)	Indiana (4–0)	Iowa State (5–0)	Tennessee (4–1)	Georgia Tech (6–0)	Vanderbilt (6–1)	Notre Dame (5–2)	Oklahoma (7–2)	Georgia Tech (8–1) т	Georgia Tech (9–1)	Vanderbilt (9–2)	Vanderbilt (10–2)	Vanderbilt (10–2)	BYU (12–2)	12.
13.	South Carolina	Michigan (1–0)	Ole Miss (2–0)	Iowa State (4–0)	Iowa State (4–0)	LSU (4–1)	Georgia Tech (5–0)	Oklahoma (5–1)	Notre Dame (5–2)	Texas Tech (7–1)	Texas (7–2)	BYU (8–1) т	Vanderbilt (8–2)	Miami (FL) (9–2)	Miami (FL) (10–2)	BYU (11–2)	Texas (10–3)	13.
14.	Michigan	Ole Miss (1–0)	Iowa State (3–0)	Alabama (2–1)	Texas Tech (4–0)	Texas Tech (4–0)	Missouri (5–0)	BYU (6–0)	Missouri (6–1)	Tennessee (6–2)	Georgia Tech (8–1)	Vanderbilt (8–2)	Utah (8–2)	Utah (9–2)	Texas (9–3)	Texas (9–3)	Utah (11–2)	14.
15.	Ole Miss	Florida (1–0)	Tennessee (2–0)	Tennessee (2–1)	Tennessee (3–1)	Tennessee (4–1)	Michigan (4–1)	Notre Dame (4–2)	Texas Tech (6–1)	Virginia (7–1)	Louisville (7–1)	Utah (7–2)	Miami (FL) (8–2)	Michigan (9–2)	Utah (10–2)	Utah (10–2)	Vanderbilt (10–3)	15.
16.	SMU	SMU (1–0)	Oklahoma (2–0)	Texas Tech (3–0)	Alabama (2–1)	Georgia Tech (5–0)	Notre Dame (3–2)	Missouri (5–1)	Virginia (6–1)	Cincinnati (7–1)	Vanderbilt (7–2)	Miami (FL) (7–2)	USC (8–2)	Texas (8–3)	Virginia (10–2)	USC (9–3)	Virginia (11–3)	16.
17.	Florida	Tennessee (1–0)	Texas A&M (2–0)	Indiana (3–0)	Georgia Tech (4–0)	Vanderbilt (5–0)	Illinois (5–1)	Texas (4–2)	Tennessee (5–2)	Louisville (6–1)	Missouri (6–2)	Michigan (7–2)	Michigan (8–2)	Virginia (9–2)	USC (9–3)	Michigan (9–3)	Iowa (9–4)	17.
18.	Tennessee	Iowa State (1–0)	Alabama (1–1)	Utah (3–0)	Michigan (3–1)	Missouri (5–0)	BYU (5–0)	Vanderbilt (5–1)	Texas (5–2)	Oklahoma (6–2)	Miami (FL) (6–2)	USC (7–2)	Texas (7–3)	Tennessee (8–3)	Michigan (9–3)	Tulane (11–2)	Tulane (11–3)	18.
19.	Indiana	Florida State (1–0)	Indiana (2–0)	Georgia Tech (3–0)	Missouri (4–0)	Florida State (3–1)	Texas (3–2)	Virginia (5–1)	LSU (5–2)	Texas (6–2)	Utah (7–2)	Virginia (8–2)	Virginia (9–2)	Georgia Tech (9–2)	James Madison (11–1)	James Madison (12–1)	Houston (10–3)	19.
20.	Kansas State	Alabama (0–1)	Texas Tech (2–0)	Michigan (2–1)	Vanderbilt (4–0)	Michigan (3–1)	Vanderbilt (5–1)	Memphis (6–0)	South Florida (6–1)	Missouri (6–2)	Michigan (7–2)	Tennessee (6–3)	Tennessee (7–3)	USC (8–3)	North Texas (11–1)	Arizona (9–3)	James Madison (12–2)	20.
21.	Texas A&M т	Indiana (1–0)	Utah (2–0)	Notre Dame (0–2)	Notre Dame (1–2)	Notre Dame (2–2)	Iowa State (5–1)	USC (5–1)	Cincinnati (6–1)	Michigan (6–2)	USC (6–2)	Louisville (7–2)	Missouri (7–3)	James Madison (10–1)	Tulane (10–2)	Virginia (10–3)	USC (9–4)	21.
22.	Iowa State т	Texas A&M (1–0)	Michigan (1–1)	Missouri (3–0)	USC (4–0)	Illinois (4–1)	Penn State (3–2)	Utah (5–1)	Louisville (5–1)	Houston (7–1)	Tennessee (6–3)	Cincinnati (7–2)	James Madison (9–1)	North Texas (10–1)	Arizona (9–3)	Georgia Tech (9–3)	Michigan (9–4)	22.
23.	BYU	Texas Tech (1–0)	South Florida (2–0)	Vanderbilt (3–0)	Illinois (3–1)	BYU (4–0)	Arizona State (4–1)	South Florida (5–1)	Illinois (5–2)	Navy (7–0)	Memphis (8–1)	Pittsburgh (7–2)	North Texas (9–1)	Tulane (9–2)	Georgia Tech (9–3)	Tennessee (8–4)	Navy (10–2)	23.
24.	Texas Tech	Oklahoma (1–0)	Arizona State (1–1)	South Carolina (2–1)	BYU (3–0)	Arizona State (4–1)	Virginia (5–1)	Cincinnati (5–1)	Michigan (5–2)	Utah (6–2)	Iowa (6–2)	Missouri (6–3)	Houston (8–2)	Pittsburgh (8–3)	Tennessee (8–4)	Houston (9–3)	Georgia Tech (9–4)	24.
25.	Boise State	BYU (1–0)	BYU (2–0)	Auburn (3–0)	TCU (3–0)	Utah (4–1)	Memphis (6–0)	Illinois (5–2)	Arizona State (5–2)	Memphis (7–1)	Cincinnati (7–2)	James Madison (8–1)	Tulane (8–2)	SMU (8–3)	Navy (9–2)	Navy (9–2)	Illinois (9–4)	25.
	Preseason Aug 4	Week 1 Sep 2	Week 2 Sep 7	Week 3 Sep 14	Week 4 Sep 21	Week 5 Sep 28	Week 6 Oct 5	Week 7 Oct 12	Week 8 Oct 19	Week 9 Oct 26	Week 10 Nov 2	Week 11 Nov 9	Week 12 Nov 16	Week 13 Nov 23	Week 14 Nov 30	Week 15 Dec 7	Week 16 (Final) Jan 20	
		Dropped: Kansas State (1–1); Boise State (0–1)	Dropped: Florida (1–1); SMU (1–1)	Dropped: Clemson (1–2); South Florida (2–1); Arizona State (2–1); BYU (2–0)	Dropped: Utah (3–1); South Carolina (2–2); Auburn (3–1)	Dropped: USC (4–1); TCU (3–1)	Dropped: Florida State (3–2); Utah (4–1)	Dropped: Michigan (4–2); Iowa State (5–2); Penn State (3–3); Arizona State (4–2)	Dropped: Memphis (6–1); USC (5–2); Utah (5–2)	Dropped: LSU (5–3); South Florida (6–2); Illinois (5–3); Arizona State (5–3)	Dropped: Houston (7–2); Navy (7–1)	Dropped: Memphis (8–2); Iowa (6–3)	Dropped: Louisville (7–3); Cincinnati (7–3); Pittsburgh (7–3)	Dropped: Missouri (7–4); Houston (8–3)	Dropped: Pittsburgh (8–4); SMU (8–4)	Dropped: North Texas (11–2)	Dropped: Arizona (9–4); Tennessee (8–5)	

== CFP rankings ==
Bold indicates teams whose rankings result in a bid to the College Football Playoff.

The committee did not rank a Group of Six conference in the top 25 in the Week 10 rankings. Instead, as indicated by the second table, the committee indicated the top ranked Group of Six team.

	Week 10 Nov 4	Week 11 Nov 11	Week 12 Nov 18	Week 13 Nov 25	Week 14 Dec 2	Week 15 (Final) Dec 7	
1.	**Ohio State** (8–0)	**Ohio State** (9–0)	**Ohio State** (10–0)	**Ohio State** (11–0)	**Ohio State** (12–0)	**Indiana** (13–0)	1.
2.	**Indiana** (9–0)	**Indiana** (10–0)	**Indiana** (11–0)	**Indiana** (11–0)	**Indiana** (12–0)	**Ohio State** (12–1)	2.
3.	**Texas A&M** (8–0)	**Texas A&M** (9–0)	**Texas A&M** (10–0)	**Texas A&M** (11–0)	**Georgia** (11–1)	**Georgia** (12–1)	3.
4.	**Alabama** (7–1)	**Alabama** (8–1)	**Georgia** (9–1)	**Georgia** (10–1)	**Texas Tech** (11–1)	**Texas Tech** (12–1)	4.
5.	**Georgia** (7–1)	**Georgia** (8–1)	**Texas Tech** (10–1)	**Texas Tech** (10–1)	**Oregon** (11–1)	**Oregon** (11–1)	5.
6.	**Ole Miss** (8–1)	**Texas Tech** (9–1)	**Ole Miss** (10–1)	**Oregon** (10–1)	**Ole Miss** (11–1)	**Ole Miss** (11–1)	6.
7.	**BYU** (8–0)	**Ole Miss** (9–1)	**Oregon** (9–1)	**Ole Miss** (10–1)	**Texas A&M** (11–1)	**Texas A&M** (11–1)	7.
8.	**Texas Tech** (8–1)	**Oregon** (8–1)	**Oklahoma** (8–2)	**Oklahoma** (9–2)	**Oklahoma** (10–2)	**Oklahoma** (10–2)	8.
9.	**Oregon** (7–1)	**Notre Dame** (7–2)	**Notre Dame** (8–2)	**Notre Dame** (9–2)	**Alabama** (10–2)	**Alabama** (10–3)	9.
10.	**Notre Dame** (6–2)	**Texas** (7–2)	**Alabama** (8–2)	**Alabama** (9–2)	**Notre Dame** (10–2)	**Miami (FL)** (10–2)	10.
11.	Texas (7–2)	Oklahoma (7–2)	BYU (9–1)	BYU (10–1)	BYU (11–1)	Notre Dame (10–2)	11.
12.	Oklahoma (7–2)	BYU (8–1)	Utah (8–2)	**Miami (FL)** (9–2)	Miami (FL) (10–2)	BYU (11–2)	12.
13.	Utah (7–2)	Utah (7–2)	**Miami (FL)** (8–2)	Utah (9–2)	Texas (9–3)	Texas (9–3)	13.
14.	**Virginia** (8–1)	Vanderbilt (8–2)	Vanderbilt (8–2)	Vanderbilt (9–2)	Vanderbilt (10–2)	Vanderbilt (10–2)	14.
15.	Louisville (7–1)	**Miami (FL)** (7–2)	USC (8–2)	Michigan (9–2)	Utah (10–2)	Utah (10–2)	15.
16.	Vanderbilt (7–2)	Georgia Tech (8–1)	Georgia Tech (9–1)	Texas (8–3)	USC (9–3)	USC (9–3)	16.
17.	Georgia Tech (8–1)	USC (7–2)	Texas (7–3)	USC (8–3)	**Virginia** (10–2)	Arizona (9–3)	17.
18.	Miami (FL) (6–2)	Michigan (7–2)	Michigan (8–2)	Virginia (9–2)	Arizona (9–3)	Michigan (9–3)	18.
19.	USC (6–2)	Virginia (8–2)	Virginia (9–2)	Tennessee (8–3)	Michigan (9–3)	Virginia (10–3)	19.
20.	Iowa (6–2)	Louisville (7–2)	Tennessee (7–3)	Arizona State (8–3)	**Tulane** (10–2)	**Tulane** (11–2)	20.
21.	Michigan (7–2)	Iowa (6–3)	Illinois (7–3)	SMU (8–3)	Houston (9–3)	Houston (9–3)	21.
22.	Missouri (6–2)	Pittsburgh (7–2)	Missouri (7–3)	Pittsburgh (8–3)	Georgia Tech (9–3)	Georgia Tech (9–3)	22.
23.	Washington (6–2)	Tennessee (6–3)	Houston (8–2)	Georgia Tech (9–2)	Iowa (8–4)	Iowa (8–4)	23.
24.	Pittsburgh (7–2)	**South Florida** (7–2)	**Tulane** (8–2)	**Tulane** (9–2)	North Texas (11–1)	**James Madison** (12–1)	24.
25.	Tennessee (6–3)	Cincinnati (7–2)	Arizona State (7–3)	Arizona (8–3)	James Madison (11–1)	North Texas (11–2)	25.
	Week 10 Nov 4	Week 11 Nov 11	Week 12 Nov 18	Week 13 Nov 25	Week 14 Dec 2	Week 15 (Final) Dec 7	
		Dropped: Missouri (6–3); Washington (6–3)	Dropped: Louisville (7–3); Iowa (6–4); Pittsburgh (7–3); South Florida (7–3); Cincinnati (7–3)	Dropped: Illinois (7–4); Missouri (7–4); Houston (8–3)	Dropped: Tennessee (8–4); Arizona State (8–4); SMU (8–4); Pittsburgh (8–4)	None	

=== Unranked teams with playoff bid ===
	Week 10 Nov 4	Week 11 Nov 11	Week 12 Nov 18	Week 13 Nov 25	Week 14 Dec 2	Week 15 (Final) Dec 7	
G6	**Memphis** (8–1)	None	None	None	None	None	G6

== FWAA-NFF Super 16 Poll ==
The joint poll of the Football Writers Association of America and National Football Foundation is a human poll which the NCAA Football Bowl Subdivision Records book designates as being one of the "major selectors" of national championships. The NFF automatically awards its MacArthur Bowl national championship trophy to the winner of the College Football Playoff National Championship.

	Preseason Aug 11	Week 1 Sep 2	Week 2 Sep 7	Week 3 Sep 14	Week 4 Sep 21	Week 5 Sep 28	Week 6 Oct 5	Week 7 Oct 12	Week 8 Oct 19	Week 9 Oct 26	Week 10 Nov 2	Week 11 Nov 9	Week 12 Nov 16	Week 13 Nov 23	Week 14 Nov 30	Week 15 (Final) Dec 7	
1.	Texas (27)	Ohio State (1–0) (44)	Ohio State (2–0) (52)	Ohio State (3–0) (48)	Ohio State (3–0) (49)	Ohio State (4–0) (46)	Ohio State (5-0) (42)	Ohio State (6–0) (46)	Ohio State (7–0) (53)	Ohio State (7–0) (48)	Ohio State (8–0) (47)	Ohio State (9–0) (49)	Ohio State (10–0) (51)	Ohio State (11–0) (51)	Ohio State (12–0) (54)	Indiana (13–0) (55)	1.
2.	Ohio State (11)	Penn State (1–0) (6)	Penn State (2–0) (2)	Penn State (3–0) (3)	Georgia (3–0) (1)	Oregon (5–0) (8)	Oregon (5–0) (5)	Miami (FL) (5–0) (8)	Indiana (7–0) (3)	Indiana (8–0) (6)	Indiana (9–0) (9)	Indiana (10–0) (2)	Indiana (11–0) (1)	Indiana (11–0) (2)	Indiana (12–0) (2)	Georgia (12–1) (1)	2.
3.	Penn State (11)	LSU (1–0) (3)	LSU (2–0) (1)	LSU (3–0) (2)	Penn State (3–0) (3)	Miami (FL) (4–0) (2)	Miami (FL) (5–0) (9)	Indiana (6–0) (2)	Texas A&M (7–0)	Texas A&M (8–0) (2)	Texas A&M (8–0)	Texas A&M (9–0) (5)	Texas A&M (10–0) (4)	Texas A&M (11–0) (3)	Georgia (11–1)	Ohio State (12–1)	3.
4.	Georgia (2)	Georgia (1–0) (1)	Georgia (2–0) (1)	Georgia (3–0) (1)	LSU (4–0) (1)	Ole Miss (5–0)	Ole Miss (5–0)	Texas A&M (6–0)	Alabama (6–1)	Alabama (7–1)	Alabama (7–1)	Alabama (8–1)	Georgia (9–1)	Georgia (10–1)	Oregon (11–1)	Texas Tech (12–1)	4.
5.	Clemson (3)	Miami (FL) (1–0)	Oregon (2–0)	Oregon (3–0) (1)	Miami (FL) (4–0) (1)	Texas A&M (4–0)	Oklahoma (5–0)	Ole Miss (6–0)	Georgia (6–1)	Georgia (6–1)	Georgia (7–1)	Georgia (8–1)	Ole Miss (10–1)	Oregon (10–1)	Texas Tech (11–1)	Oregon (11–1)	5.
6.	Notre Dame	Oregon (1–0)	Miami (FL) (2–0)	Miami (FL) (3–0)	Oregon (4–0)	Oklahoma (4–0)	Texas A&M (5–0)	Alabama (5–1)	Oregon (6–1)	Oregon (7–1)	Oregon (7–1)	Ole Miss (9–1)	Texas Tech (10–1)	Ole Miss (10–1)	Ole Miss (11–1)	Ole Miss (11–1)	6.
7.	Oregon	Texas (0–1) (1)	Texas (1–1)	Florida State (2–0)	Florida State (3–0)	Penn State (3–1)	Alabama (4–1)	Texas Tech (6–0)	Georgia Tech (7–0)	Ole Miss (7–1)	Ole Miss (8–1)	Texas Tech (9–1)	Oregon (9–1)	Texas Tech (10–1)	Texas A&M (11–1)	Texas A&M (11–1)	7.
8.	Alabama (2)	Clemson (0–1)	Florida State (2–0)	Oklahoma (3–0)	Oklahoma (4–0)	Alabama (3–1)	Indiana (5–0)	Georgia (5–1)	Ole Miss (6–1)	Georgia Tech (8–0)	BYU (8–0)	Oregon (8–1)	Oklahoma (8–2)	Oklahoma (9–2)	Oklahoma (10–2)	Oklahoma (10–2)	8.
9.	LSU (1)	Notre Dame (0–1)	Notre Dame (0–1)	Texas (2–1)	Texas (3–1)	Texas (3–1)	Georgia (4–1)	Oregon (5–1)	Miami (FL) (6–1)	Vanderbilt (7–1)	Texas Tech (8–1)	Notre Dame (7–2)	Notre Dame (8–2)	Notre Dame (9–2)	Alabama (10–2)	Notre Dame (10–2)	9.
10.	Miami (FL)	Florida State (1–0)	Illinois (2–0)	Illinois (3–0)	Texas A&M (3–0)	Indiana (5–0)	Texas Tech (5–0)	LSU (5–1)	Vanderbilt (6–1)	Miami (FL) (6–1)	Notre Dame (6–2)	Texas (7–2)	Alabama (8–2)	Alabama (9–2)	Notre Dame (10–2)	Miami (FL) (10–2)	10.
11.	Arizona State	South Carolina (1–0)	Oklahoma (2–0)	Texas A&M (3–0)	Indiana (4–0)	Georgia (3–1)	LSU (4–1)	Tennessee (5–1)	Oklahoma (6–1)	BYU (8–0)	Virginia (8–1)	Oklahoma (7–2)	BYU (9–1)	BYU (10–1)	BYU (11–1)	Alabama (10–3)	11.
12.	Illinois	Illinois (1–0)	South Carolina (2–0)	Iowa State (4–0)	Ole Miss (4–0)	Texas Tech (4–0)	Tennessee (4–1)	Georgia Tech (6–0)	BYU (7–0)	Notre Dame (5–2)	Texas (7–2)	BYU (8–1)	Utah (8–2)	Miami (FL) (9–2)	Miami (FL) (10–2)	Texas (9–3)	12.
13.	South Carolina	Arizona State (1–0)	Clemson (1–1)	Ole Miss (3–0)	Texas Tech (4–0)	Iowa State (5–0)	Georgia Tech (5–0)	Oklahoma (5–1)	Notre Dame (5–2)	Texas Tech (7–1)	Oklahoma (7–2)	Georgia Tech (8–1)	Georgia Tech (9–1)	Vanderbilt (9–2)	Texas (9–3)	Vanderbilt (10–2)	13.
14.	Michigan	Michigan (1–0)	Iowa State (3–0)	Alabama (2–1)	Iowa State (4–0)	LSU (4–1)	Missouri (5–0)	Notre Dame (4–2)	Texas Tech (6–1)	Tennessee (6–2)	Louisville (7–1)	Vanderbilt (8–2)	Vanderbilt (8–2)	Utah (9–2)	Vanderbilt (10–2)	BYU (11–2)	14.
15.	Ole Miss	Florida (1–0)	Ole Miss (2–0)	Tennessee (2–1)	Tennessee (3–1)	Tennessee (4–1)	Michigan (4–1)	BYU (6–0)	Missouri (6–1)	Louisville (6–1)	Georgia Tech (8–1)	Utah (7–2)	Miami (FL) (8–2)	Michigan (9–2)	Utah (10–2)	Utah (10–2)	15.
16.	Tennessee	Oklahoma (1–0)	Tennessee (2–0)	Utah (3–0)	Alabama (2–1)	Vanderbilt (5–0)	Notre Dame (3–2)	Missouri (5–1)	Louisville (5–1)	Virginia (7–1)	Vanderbilt (7–2)	Miami (FL) (7–2)	USC (8–2)	Texas (8–3)	Virginia (10–2)	USC (9–3)	16.
	Preseason Aug 11	Week 1 Sep 2	Week 2 Sep 7	Week 3 Sep 14	Week 4 Sep 21	Week 5 Sep 28	Week 6 Oct 5	Week 7 Oct 12	Week 8 Oct 19	Week 9 Oct 26	Week 10 Nov 2	Week 11 Nov 9	Week 12 Nov 16	Week 13 Nov 23	Week 14 Nov 30	Week 15 (Final) Dec 7	
		Dropped: Alabama (0–1); Ole Miss (1–0); Tennessee (1–0)	Dropped: Arizona State (1–1); Florida (1–1); Michigan (1–1)	Dropped: Clemson (1–2); Notre Dame (0–2); South Carolina (2–1)	Dropped: Illinois (3–1); Utah (3–1)	Dropped: Florida State (3–1)	Dropped: Penn State (3-2); Texas (3–2); Iowa State (5–1); Vanderbilt (5–1)	Dropped: Michigan (4–2)	Dropped: LSU (5–2); Tennessee (5–2)	Dropped: Oklahoma (6–2); Missouri (6–2)	Dropped: Miami (FL) (6–2); Tennessee (6–3)	Dropped: Virginia (8–2); Louisville (7–2)	Dropped: Texas (7–3)	Dropped: Georgia Tech (9–2); USC (8–3)	Dropped: Michigan (9–3)	Dropped: Virginia (10–3)	
