= Jahzare Jackson =

American football player (born 2004)

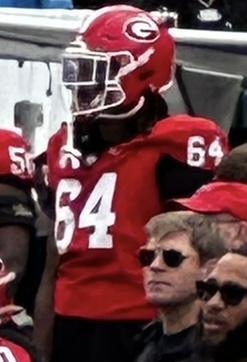
- Jackson in 2025

No. 64 – Georgia Bulldogs
- Position: Offensive tackle
- Class: Junior

Personal information
- Born: February 24, 2004 (age 22); San Diego, California, U.S.
- Listed height: 6 ft 10 in (2.08 m)
- Listed weight: 350 lb (159 kg)

Career information
- High school: IMG Academy (Bradenton, Florida)
- College: Georgia (2024–present)
- Stats at ESPN

Jahzare Jackson (born February 24, 2004) is an American college football offensive tackle for the Georgia Bulldogs of the Southeastern Conference (SEC).

Jackson used to be a multi-sport athlete. Outside of football, he also played basketball for IMG Academy in Florida and Overtime Elite in Atlanta, where he helped lead the City Reapers to three championships. He also played AAU basketball for the North Coast Blue Chips, where he was teammates with NBA player Bronny James.

== Early life ==
Jackson was introduced to basketball by his uncle and was home-schooled during middle school. He played varsity football as an eighth grader for Westminister Christian Academy.

== Career ==
=== IMG Academy ===
Jackson was considered to be one of the best big man prospects in the class of 2023, and in 2019, he decided to join IMG Academy, where he would spend his freshman and sophomore season at. During his time there, Jackson would be rated as a three-star recruit in his class.

=== Overtime Elite ===
In September of 2021, Jackson would sign a contract with Overtime Elite, where he would earn over six figures in career earnings. He would later sign with the City Reapers of the league.

Following his third year at Overtime Elite, Jackson decided to enter the 2024 NBA draft as an early entrant candidate, but ultimately chose to withdraw from it.

== Legal issues ==
On July 16, 2025, Jackson was arrested on three drug-related charges. He faced a felony charge for possession of marijuana of more than one ounce. The police also charged Jackson with misdemeanors for possession of marijuana of less than an ounce and possession and use of drug-related objects. Jackson also faces a misdemeanor charge for holding a cell phone while driving. The incident occurred at 9:31 p.m. at West Broad Street and Hawthorne Avenue in Athens. Jackson was later booked into the Clarke County Jail at 11:50 p.m. Jackson was later released at 4:17 a.m. the next morning on $5,030 bond.
