= Rasean Dinkins =

American football player

No. 14 – Georgia Bulldogs
- Position: Safety
- Class: Sophomore

Personal information
- Listed height: 5 ft 11 in (1.80 m)
- Listed weight: 190 lb (86 kg)

Career information
- High school: Warner Robins (Warner Robins, Georgia)
- College: Georgia (2025–present)
- Stats at ESPN

Rasean Dinkins is an American college football safety for the Georgia Bulldogs.

== Early life ==
Dinkins attended Warner Robins High School in Warner Robins, Georgia. As a junior in 2023, he was the Georgia Class 5A Region 2 Defensive Player of the Year after recording 62 tackles and three interceptions. He also had 724 rushing yards on 72 carries. Dinkins originally committed to Georgia Tech to play college football before flipping his commitment to the University of Georgia.

== College career ==
Dinkins played in 13 games and started two games his freshman year at Georgia in 2025, recording 13 tackles. He returned to Georgia for his sophomore season in 2026 and became a starter during the season.
