= Zayden Walker =

American football player

No. 10 – Georgia Bulldogs
- Position: Linebacker
- Class: Sophomore

Personal information
- Listed height: 6 ft 1 in (1.85 m)
- Listed weight: 225 lb (102 kg)

Career information
- High school: Schley Middle (Ellaville, Georgia)
- College: Georgia (2025–present)
- Stats at ESPN

Zayden Walker is an American college football linebacker for the Georgia Bulldogs of the Southeastern Conference (SEC).

== Early life ==
Walker attended Schley Middle High School in Ellaville, Georgia. As a junior he had 40 tackles with seven tackles and also rushed for 518 yards with 13 touchdowns on offense. As a senior he was the GHSA All-Region 6-A DII Defensive Player of the Year after recording 77 tackles, 2.5 sacks and an interception. A five-star recruit, Walker committed to the University of Georgia to play college football.

== College career ==
Walker gradually earned playing time over his true freshman year at Georgia in 2025.
