= Juan Gaston =

American football player

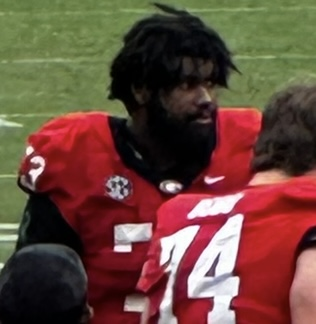
- Gaston in 2025

No. 73 – Georgia Bulldogs
- Position: Offensive tackle
- Class: Sophomore

Personal information
- Listed height: 6 ft 7 in (2.01 m)
- Listed weight: 360 lb (163 kg)

Career information
- High school: Westlake (Atlanta, Georgia)
- College: Georgia (2025–present)
- Stats at ESPN

Juan Gaston Jr. is an American college football offensive tackle for the Georgia Bulldogs of the Southeastern Conference (SEC).

== Early life ==
Gaston attended Westlake High School in Atlanta, Georgia. A four-star recruit, he received offers from a multitude of schools, including Georgia, Tennessee, and Alabama. Gaston committed to play college football at the University of Georgia.

== College career ==
Entering the 2025 season, Gaston is competing for Georgia's starting right guard job, earning first team reps in fall camp scrimmages.
