= Lawson Luckie =

American football player (born 2004)

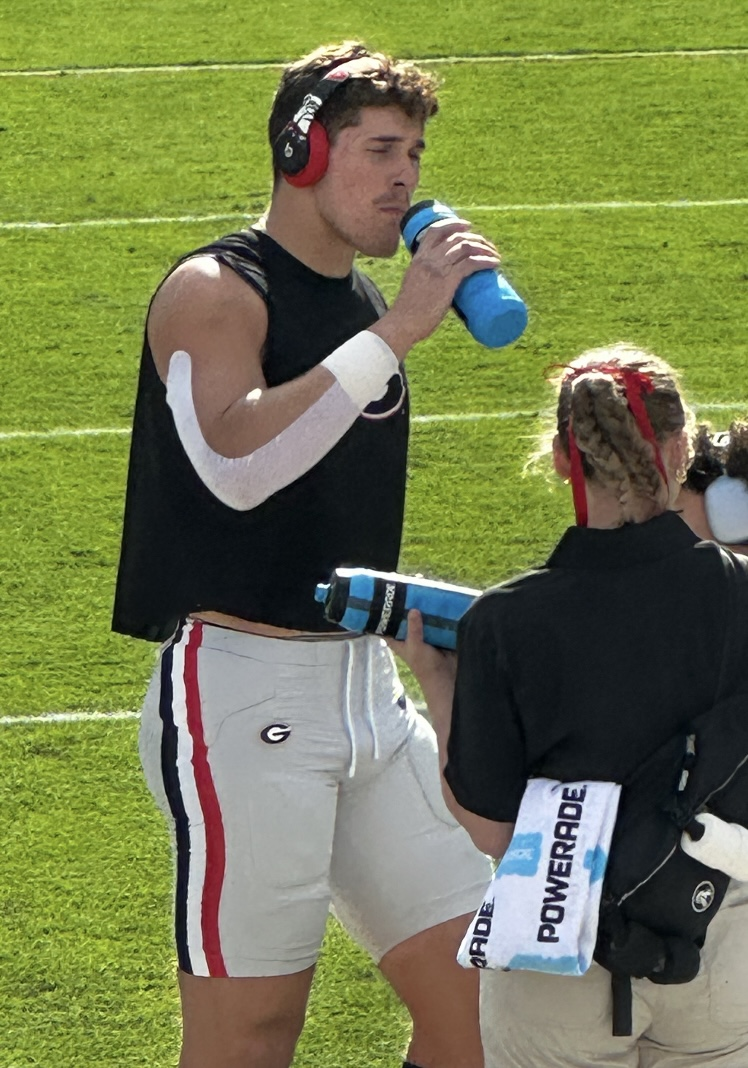
- Luckie in 2025

No. 7 – Georgia Bulldogs
- Position: Tight end
- Class: Senior

Personal information
- Born: October 21, 2004 (age 22)
- Listed height: 6 ft 4 in (1.93 m)
- Listed weight: 240 lb (109 kg)

Career information
- High school: Norcross (Norcross, Georgia)
- College: Georgia (2023–present)
- Stats at ESPN

Lawson Luckie (born October 21, 2004) is an American college football tight end for the Georgia Bulldogs of the Southeastern Conference (SEC).

== Early life ==
Luckie grew up in Norcross, Georgia, and attended Norcross High School. He accumulated 728 all-purpose yards as a senior. Luckie was rated a four-star recruit and committed to play college football at Georgia over offers from Alabama, Auburn, Florida State, LSU, Ole Miss, and Texas A&M.

== College career ==
Luckie joined the Georgia Bulldogs as an early enrollee in December 2022 and took part in the team's practices leading up to the 2022 Peach Bowl. He played in seven games as a true freshman and caught two passes for nine yards and one touchdown.

== Personal life ==
Lawson's father, Mike Luckie, and two triplet uncles, Dustin and Miles, played college football at Georgia.
