= 2026 Southeastern Conference football season =

Sports season in America

- September 3 – December 5, 2026
- League: NCAA Division I Football Bowl Subdivision
- Sport: Football
- Games: 9
- Teams: 16
- TV partner(s): ABC, ESPN, ESPN2, ESPN3, ESPNU, SEC Network, ESPN+ (streaming)

2027 NFL draft

SEC Championship Game
- Date: December 5, 2026
- Venue: Mercedes-Benz Stadium, Atlanta, Georgia

SEC seasons
- 2025 2027

2026 Southeastern Conference football standings
	Conf.			Overall
Team	W		L	W		L
No. 1 Georgia y	8	–	1	10	–	1
No. 5 Texas	6	–	2	9	–	2
No. 9 Tennessee	6	–	2	9	–	2
No. 3 Alabama	6	–	2	9	–	2
No. 22 Oklahoma	5	–	3	7	–	4
No. 24 Florida	5	–	4	7	–	4
No. 16 Kentucky	5	–	4	7	–	4
No. 25 Ole Miss	4	–	4	7	–	4
Auburn	4	–	4	7	–	4
Missouri	4	–	4	7	–	4
No. 21 South Carolina	4	–	5	6	–	5
LSU	3	–	5	6	–	5
Mississippi State	2	–	6	5	–	6
Arkansas	2	–	6	4	–	7
Texas A&M	1	–	7	4	–	7
Vanderbilt	1	–	7	4	–	7
Championship: Georgia vs TBD
^ – College Football Playoff participant; $ – Conference champion; y – Championship game participant; As of November 22, 2026; Rankings from CFP rankings

The 2026 Southeastern Conference football season is the 95th season of Southeastern Conference (SEC) football. This is the SEC's third season with 16 teams with the additions of Texas and Oklahoma, and its third season since 1991 with a non-divisional scheduling format.

== Preseason ==
2026 SEC Spring Football and number of signees on signing day:

- Alabama -
- Arkansas -
- Auburn -
- Florida -
- Georgia -
- Kentucky -
- LSU -
- Mississippi State -
- Missouri -
- Oklahoma -
- Ole Miss -
- South Carolina -
- Tennessee -
- Texas -
- Texas A&M -
- Vanderbilt -

=== Recruiting classes ===
National rankings
Team	ESPN	On3/Rivals	24/7	Total signees
Alabama	5	6	2	27
Arkansas	44	44	46	25
Auburn	29	42	31	21
Florida	16	16	17	21
Georgia	6	5	6	33
Kentucky	51	53	60	16
LSU	12	12	11	19
Mississippi State	34	28	23	32
Missouri	32	27	34	23
Oklahoma	17	15	15	25
Ole Miss	26	26	22	23
South Carolina	25	18	14	19
Tennessee	8	9	8	31
Texas	3	10	7	25
Texas A&M	7	7	10	27
Vanderbilt	33	31	33	23

Note: ESPN only ranks the top 75 teams.

=== 2026 Media Days ===
The 2026 SEC Media days took place from July 20–23, 2026 at the JW Marriott and Tampa Marriott Water Street, in Tampa, Florida.

This marked the first time ever that Tampa has hosted the annual preseason event.

It was the sixth time they were held outside of Birmingham, Alabama. Each team was expected to have its head coach available to talk to the media at the event, which was televised on SEC Network and ESPN.

The schedule for the teams was:

Date	School	Coach	Player(s)
July 20	Kentucky	Will Stein	Ty Bryant (S), Kenny Minchey (QB) & Willie Rodriguez (TE)
July 20	Missouri	Eliah Drinkwitz	Cayden Green (OL), Jamal Roberts (RB) & Nicholas Rodriguez (LB)
July 20	Oklahoma	Brent Venables	John Mateer (QB), Eddy Pierre-Louis (OL) & Taylor Wein (DL)
July 20	Tennessee	Josh Heupel	DeSean Bishop (RB), Arion Carter (LB) & Jeremiah Telander (LB)
July 21	Auburn	Alex Golesh	Champ Anthony (DB), Byrum Brown (QB) & Alex McPherson (K)
July 21	Georgia	Kirby Smart	Drew Bobo (OL), Gunner Stockton (QB) & Raylen Wilson (LB)
July 21	South Carolina	Shane Beamer	Nyck Harbor (WR), LaNorris Sellers (QB) & Peyton Williams (DB)
July 21	Vanderbilt	Clark Lea	Sedrick Alexander (RB), Issa Oattara (DL) & Junior Sherrill (WR)
July 22	Alabama	Kalen DeBoer	Zabien Brown (DB), Ryan Coleman-Williams (WR) & Bray Hubbard (DB)
July 22	Florida	Jon Sumrall	Jadan Baugh (RB), Myles Graham (LB) & Vernell Brown III (WR)
July 22	Ole Miss	Pete Golding	Trinidad Chambliss (QB), Will Echoles (DT) & Kewan Lacy (RB)
July 22	Texas A&M	Mike Elko	Daymion Sanford (LB), Marcus Ratcliffe (S) & Marcel Reed (QB)
July 23	Arkansas	Ryan Silverfield	Caden Kitler (OL), Quincy Rhodes Jr. (DE) & Sutton Smith (RB)
July 23	LSU	Lane Kiffin	TJ Dottery (LB), Trey'Dez Green (TE) & Whit Weeks (LB)
July 23	Mississippi State	Jeff Lebby	Anthony Evans III (WR), Kelley Jones (CB) & Kamario Taylor (QB)
July 23	Texas	Steve Sarkisian	Trevor Goosby (OL), Arch Manning (QB) & Colin Simmons (DE)

==== Preseason media poll ====
Preseason polls were released on July 24, 2026.

SEC
Predicted finish	Team	Votes (1st place)
1	Georgia	2,519
2	Texas	2,449
3	Ole Miss	2,004
4	Texas A&M	1,967
5	LSU	1,961
6	Alabama	1,930
7	Oklahoma	1,914
8	Tennessee	1,320
9	Florida	1,217
10	Missouri	1,105
11	South Carolina	956
12	Auburn	936
13	Vanderbilt	751
14	Kentucky	546
15	Mississippi State	467
16	Arkansas	262

Media poll (SEC Championship)
Rank	Team	Votes
1	Georgia	88
2	Texas	57
3	Ole Miss	6
4	Texas A&M	5
5	Alabama	3
6	Oklahoma	2
7	LSU	2
8	Kentucky	1

=== Preseason awards ===
==== Preseason All−American Teams ====
Player	AP 1st Team	AP 2nd Team	AS 1st Team	AS 2nd Team	AS 3rd Team	AS 4th Team	WCFF 1st Team	WCFF 2nd Team	ESPN	CBS 1st Team	CBS 2nd Team	CFN 1st Team	CFN 2nd Team	PFF 1st Team	SN 1st Team	SN 2nd Team	SI 1st Team	SI 2nd Team	USAT 1st Team	USAT 2nd Team
Xavier Atkins	✓		✓				✓		✓	✓					✓			✓		✓
Jadan Baugh									✓											
Rasheem Biles	✓		✓				✓		✓	✓					✓		✓		✓	
Ty Benefield		✓							✓		✓				✓					
Drew Bobo		✓		✓				✓	✓	✓							✓			✓
KJ Bolden	✓		✓				✓		✓	✓					✓		✓		✓	
Peyton Bowen																		✓		
Zabien Brown		✓			✓						✓							✓		✓
Lucas Carneiro		✓		✓				✓			✓				✓			✓		✓
Trinidad Chambliss		✓									✓				✓		✓			
Cam Coleman	✓		✓					✓	✓	✓					✓		✓			✓
Ryan Coleman-Williams					✓															
Mario Craver				✓																
Will Echoles		✓			✓										✓			✓		
Nate Frazier						✓														
Trevor Goosby	✓		✓				✓		✓	✓					✓		✓		✓	
Cayden Green		✓	✓								✓					✓				✓
Trey'Dez Green	✓		✓				✓			✓							✓			✓
Earnest Greene					✓															
Elijah Griffin						✓														
Ahmad Hardy	✓		✓				✓				✓				✓				✓	
Bray Hubbard	✓		✓					✓			✓					✓			✓	
Kelley Jones		✓		✓			✓													
Patrick Kutas						✓														
Kewan Lacy	✓		✓				✓		✓	✓					✓		✓		✓	
Kip Lewis				✓																✓
Arch Manning			✓				✓									✓				
Jelani McDonald						✓														
Grayson Miller					✓															
Wendell Moe Jr.					✓			✓												
Ryan Niblett			✓						✓	✓					✓		✓			✓
Suntarine Perkins					✓															
DJ Pickett					✓															
Yhonzae Pierre						✓														
Rayshawn Pleasant					✓															
Marcus Ratcliffe				✓				✓												
Ty Redmond						✓														
Ellis Robinson IV	✓		✓					✓		✓					✓					✓
Ben Roberts																✓				
Keon Sabb					✓															
Tate Sandell	✓		✓				✓		✓	✓						✓			✓	
Isaiah Sategna III						✓														
Jordan Seaton		✓			✓			✓			✓						✓			✓
Colin Simmons	✓		✓				✓		✓	✓					✓		✓		✓	
Dylan Stewart	✓			✓			✓		✓	✓						✓			✓	
David Stone	✓			✓				✓		✓						✓	✓			
Vicari Swain				✓							✓					✓		✓		
Princewill Umanmielen					✓													✓		
Whit Weeks			✓								✓									
Taylor Wein					✓															
Raylen Wilson		✓		✓												✓		✓		✓
Peyton Woodring						✓														

==== Preseason individual awards ====
Award	Head coach/player	School	Position	Year	Ref
Lott Trophy	Bray Hubbard	Alabama	DL	Sr.	
Lott Trophy	Quincy Rhodes Jr.	Arkansas	EDGE	Sr.	
Lott Trophy	Ellis Robinson IV	Georgia	DB	So.	
Lott Trophy	KJ Bolden	Georgia	DB	Jr.	
Lott Trophy	Ty Bryant	Kentucky	DB	Sr.	
Lott Trophy	Whit Weeks	LSU	LB	Sr.	
Lott Trophy	Kelley Jones	Mississippi State	CB	Jr.	
Lott Trophy	Peyton Bowen	Oklahoma	DB	Sr.	
Lott Trophy	Taylor Wein	Oklahoma	DL	Sr.	
Lott Trophy	Dylan Stewart	South Carolina	EDGE	Jr.	
Lott Trophy	Arion Carter	Tennessee	LB	Sr.	
Lott Trophy	Colin Simmons	Texas	EDGE	Jr.	
Lott Trophy	Marcus Ratcliffe	Texas A&M	S	Sr.	
Dodd Trophy	Kalen DeBoer	Alabama	HC	--	
Dodd Trophy	Kirby Smart	Georgia	HC	--	
Dodd Trophy	Brent Venables	Oklahoma	HC	--	
Dodd Trophy	Josh Heupel	Tennessee	HC	--	
Dodd Trophy	Steve Sarkisian	Texas	HC	--	
Dodd Trophy	Mike Elko	Texas A&M	HC	--	
Maxwell Award	Ryan Coleman-Williams	Alabama	WR	Jr.	
Maxwell Award	Byrum Brown	Auburn	QB	Sr.	
Maxwell Award	Jeremiah Cobb	Auburn	RB	Sr.	
Maxwell Award	Jadan Baugh	Florida	RB	Jr.	
Maxwell Award	Gunner Stockton	Georgia	QB	R-Sr.	
Maxwell Award	Nate Frazier	Georgia	RB	Jr.	
Maxwell Award	Sam Leavitt	LSU	QB	Jr.	
Maxwell Award	Ahmad Hardy	Missouri	RB	Jr.	
Maxwell Award	John Mateer	Oklahoma	QB	Sr.	
Maxwell Award	Kewan Lacy	Ole Miss	RB	Jr.	
Maxwell Award	Trinidad Chambliss	Ole Miss	QB	Sr.	
Maxwell Award	LaNorris Sellers	South Carolina	QB	R-Jr.	
Maxwell Award	DeSean Bishop	Tennessee	RB	R-Jr.	
Maxwell Award	Arch Manning	Texas	QB	R-Jr.	
Maxwell Award	Cam Coleman	Texas	WR	Jr.	
Maxwell Award	Marcel Reed	Texas A&M	QB	R-Jr.	
Maxwell Award	Mario Craver	Texas A&M	WR	Jr.	
Patrick Mannelly Award	Hudson Powell	Auburn	LS	R-Sr.	
Patrick Mannelly Award	Brett Le Blanc	Missouri	LS	Sr.	
Patrick Mannelly Award	Ben Anderson	Oklahoma	LS	R-Sr.	
Patrick Mannelly Award	Bennett Brady	Tennessee	LS	R-Sr.	
Patrick Mannelly Award	Shea Freibaum	Texas A&M	LS	R-Jr.	
Outland Trophy	Michael Carroll	Alabama	G	So.	
Outland Trophy	Drew Bobo	Georgia	OT	R-Sr.	
Outland Trophy	Earnest Greene	Georgia	OT	R-Sr.	
Outland Trophy	Lance Heard	Kentucky	OT	Sr.	
Outland Trophy	Jordan Seaton	LSU	OT	Jr.	
Outland Trophy	Cayden Green	Missouri	OT	Sr.	
Outland Trophy	David Stone	Oklahoma	DT	Jr.	
Outland Trophy	Will Echoles	Ole Miss	DT	Jr.	
Outland Trophy	Patrick Kutas	Ole Miss	G	R-Sr.	
Outland Trophy	Wendell Moe Jr.	Tennessee	G	R-Sr.	
Outland Trophy	Brandon Baker	Texas	G	Jr.	
Outland Trophy	Trevor Goosby	Texas	OT	R-Jr.	
Outland Trophy	Mark Nabou Jr.	Texas A&M	C	Gr.	
Bronko Nagurski Trophy	Bray Hubbard	Alabama	S	Sr.	
Bronko Nagurski Trophy	Zabien Brown	Alabama	CB	Jr.	
Bronko Nagurski Trophy	Xavier Atkins	Auburn	LB	Jr.	
Bronko Nagurski Trophy	KJ Bolden	Georgia	S	Jr.	
Bronko Nagurski Trophy	Raylen Wilson	Georgia	LB	Sr.	
Bronko Nagurski Trophy	Princewill Umanmielen	LSU	DE	Sr.	
Bronko Nagurski Trophy	Whit Weeks	LSU	LB	Sr.	
Bronko Nagurski Trophy	Kelley Jones	Mississippi State	CB	R-Jr.	
Bronko Nagurski Trophy	David Stone	Oklahoma	DT	Jr.	
Bronko Nagurski Trophy	Kip Lewis	Oklahoma	LB	R-Sr.	
Bronko Nagurski Trophy	Suntarine Perkins	Ole Miss	LB	Sr.	
Bronko Nagurski Trophy	Will Echoles	Ole Miss	DT	Jr.	
Bronko Nagurski Trophy	Dylan Stewart	South Carolina	DE	Jr.	
Bronko Nagurski Trophy	Ty Redmond	Tennessee	CB	So.	
Bronko Nagurski Trophy	Colin Simmons	Texas	DE	Jr.	
Bronko Nagurski Trophy	Rasheem Biles	Texas	LB	Sr.	
Bronko Nagurski Trophy	Marcus Ratcliffe	Texas A&M	S	Sr.	
John Mackey Award	Jaden Platt	Arkansas	TE	R-Jr.	--
John Mackey Award	Lawson Luckie	Georgia	TE	Sr.	--
John Mackey Award	Willie Rodriguez	Kentucky	TE	Jr.	--
John Mackey Award	Trey'Dez Green	LSU	TE	Jr.	--
John Mackey Award	Brett Norfleet	Missouri	TE	Sr.	--
John Mackey Award	Luke Hasz	Ole Miss	TE	Sr.	--
John Mackey Award	Ethan Davis	Tennessee	TE	Jr.	--
John Mackey Award	Michael Masunas	Texas	TE	R-Sr.	--
John Mackey Award	Houston Thomas	Texas A&M	TE	Gr.	--
John Mackey Award	Richie Anderson	Texas A&M	TE	R-Jr.	--
Rimington Trophy	Cole Best	Auburn	C	Sr.	
Rimington Trophy	Harrison Moore	Florida	C	Jr.	
Rimington Trophy	Drew Bobo	Georgia	C	R-Sr.	
Rimington Trophy	Coleton Price	Kentucky	C	Sr.	
Rimington Trophy	Braelin Moore	LSU	C	Gr.	
Rimington Trophy	Canon Boone	Mississippi State	C	Gr.	
Rimington Trophy	Dominick Giudice	Missouri	C	Gr.	
Rimington Trophy	Jake Maikkula	Oklahoma	C	Gr.	
Rimington Trophy	Connor Robertson	Texas	C	Gr.	
Rimington Trophy	Mark Nabou Jr.	Texas A&M	C	Gr.	
Rimington Trophy	Lyndon Cooper	Vanderbilt	C	Gr.	
Lou Groza Award	Lorcan Quinn	Alabama	PK	So.	
Lou Groza Award	Alex McPherson	Auburn	PK	R-Sr.	
Lou Groza Award	Patrick Durkin	Florida	PK	R-So.	
Lou Groza Award	Peyton Woodring	Georgia	PK	Sr.	
Lou Groza Award	Kyle Ferrie	Mississippi State	PK	Sr.	
Lou Groza Award	Lucas Carneiro	Ole Miss	PK	5Yr.	
Lou Groza Award	Tate Sandell	Oklahoma	PK	5Yr.	
Lou Groza Award	Cooper Ranvier	Tennessee	PK	Jr.	
Lou Groza Award	Gianni Spetic	Texas	PK	Sr.	
Lou Groza Award	David Olano	Texas A&M	PK	Gr.	
Lou Groza Award	Brock Taylor	Vanderbilt	PK	Sr.	
Paul Hornung Award	Sutton Smith	Arkansas	RB	R-Sr.	
Paul Hornung Award	Rayshawn Pleasant	Auburn	CB	Sr.	
Paul Hornung Award	Jadan Baugh	Florida	RB	Jr.	
Paul Hornung Award	Vernell Brown III	Florida	WR	So.	
Paul Hornung Award	Anthony Evans III	Mississippi State	WR	Sr.	
Paul Hornung Award	Isaiah Sategna III	Oklahoma	WR	R-Sr.	
Paul Hornung Award	Vicari Swain	South Carolina	DB	R-Jr.	
Paul Hornung Award	Ryan Niblett	Texas	RB/WR	Jr.	
Paul Hornung Award	Martel Hight	Vanderbilt	CB	Sr.	
Paul Hornung Award	Junior Sherrill	Vanderbilt	WR	Sr.	
Wuerffel Trophy	Bray Hubbard	Alabama	S	Sr.	
Wuerffel Trophy	Jaden Platt	Arkansas	TE	R-Jr.	
Wuerffel Trophy	Alex McPherson	Auburn	K	R-Sr.	
Wuerffel Trophy	Myles Graham	Florida	LB	Jr.	
Wuerffel Trophy	Lawson Luckie	Georgia	TE	Sr.	
Wuerffel Trophy	Willie Rodriguez	Kentucky	TE	Jr.	
Wuerffel Trophy	Whit Weeks	LSU	LB	Sr.	
Wuerffel Trophy	DJ Chester	Mississippi State	OL	R-Jr.	
Wuerffel Trophy	Blake Craig	Missouri	K	Sr.	
Wuerffel Trophy	Danny Okoye	Oklahoma	DL	R-So.	
Wuerffel Trophy	Will Echoles	Ole Miss	DT	Jr.	
Wuerffel Trophy	Nyck Harbor	South Carolina	WR	Sr.	
Wuerffel Trophy	Edwin Spillman	Tennessee	LB	R-So.	
Wuerffel Trophy	Colin Simmons	Texas	DE	Jr.	
Wuerffel Trophy	Marcus Ratcliffe	Texas A&M	S	Sr.	
Wuerffel Trophy	Nick Rinaldi	Vanderbilt	LB	Gr.	
Jim Thorpe Award	Zabien Brown	Alabama	CB	Jr.	
Jim Thorpe Award	Bray Hubbard	Alabama	S	Sr.	
Jim Thorpe Award	KJ Bolden	Georgia	S	Jr.	
Jim Thorpe Award	Ellis Robinson IV	Georgia	CB	R-So.	
Jim Thorpe Award	Kelley Jones	Mississippi State	CB	R-Jr.	
Jim Thorpe Award	Jelani McDonald	Texas	S	Sr.	
Butkus Award	Caleb Woodson	Alabama	LB	Sr.	
Butkus Award	Xavier Atkins	Auburn	LB	Jr.	
Butkus Award	Myles Graham	Florida	LB	Jr.	
Butkus Award	Chris Cole	Georgia	LB	Jr.	
Butkus Award	Raylen Wilson	Georgia	LB	Sr.	
Butkus Award	TJ Dottery	LSU	LB	R-Sr.	
Butkus Award	Whit Weeks	LSU	LB	Sr.	
Butkus Award	Owen Heinecke	Oklahoma	LB	R-Sr.	
Butkus Award	Kip Lewis	Oklahoma	LB	R-Sr.	
Butkus Award	Keaton Thomas	Ole Miss	LB	R-Sr.	
Butkus Award	Amare Campbell	Tennessee	LB	Sr.	
Butkus Award	Arion Carter	Tennessee	LB	Sr.	
Butkus Award	Rasheem Biles	Texas	LB	Sr.	
Butkus Award	Ray Coney	Texas A&M	LB	Sr.	
Ray Guy Award	Alec Clark	Florida	P	R-Jr.	
Ray Guy Award	Grant Chadwick	LSU	P	Jr.	
Ray Guy Award	Ethan Pulliam	Mississippi State	P	R-Jr.	
Ray Guy Award	Grayson Miller	Oklahoma	P	5Yr.	
Ray Guy Award	Oscar Bird	Ole Miss	P	Jr.	
Ray Guy Award	Jackson Ross	Tennessee	P	5Yr.	
Ray Guy Award	Tyler White	Texas A&M	P	R-Jr.	

Award	Head coach/player	School	Position	Year	Ref
Rotary Lombardi Award	Xavier Atkins	Auburn	LB	Jr.	
Rotary Lombardi Award	Drew Bobo	Georgia	C	R-Sr.	
Rotary Lombardi Award	Trey'Dez Green	LSU	TE	Jr.	
Rotary Lombardi Award	Jordan Seaton	LSU	OT	Jr.	
Rotary Lombardi Award	Princewill Umanmielen	LSU	DE	Sr.	
Rotary Lombardi Award	Whit Weeks	LSU	LB	Sr.	
Rotary Lombardi Award	Cayden Green	Missouri	OT	Sr.	
Rotary Lombardi Award	David Stone	Oklahoma	DT	Jr.	
Rotary Lombardi Award	Will Echoles	Ole Miss	DT	Jr.	
Rotary Lombardi Award	Dylan Stewart	South Carolina	EDGE	Jr.	
Rotary Lombardi Award	Wendell Moe Jr.	Tennessee	OG	R-Sr.	
Rotary Lombardi Award	Rasheem Biles	Texas	LB	Sr.	
Rotary Lombardi Award	Trevor Goosby	Texas	OT	R-Jr.	
Rotary Lombardi Award	Colin Simmons	Texas	EDGE	Jr.	
Rotary Lombardi Award	DJ Hicks	Texas A&M	DT	Sr.	
Rotary Lombardi Award	Anto Saka	Texas A&M	DE	R-Sr.	
Walter Camp Award	Xavier Atkins	Auburn	LB	Jr.	
Walter Camp Award	Ellis Robinson IV	Georgia	DB	R-So.	
Walter Camp Award	Gunner Stockton	Georgia	QB	R-Sr.	
Walter Camp Award	Trey'Dez Green	LSU	TE	Jr.	
Walter Camp Award	Ahmad Hardy	Missouri	RB	Jr.	
Walter Camp Award	John Mateer	Oklahoma	QB	R-Sr.	
Walter Camp Award	Trinidad Chambliss	Ole Miss	QB	R-Sr.	
Walter Camp Award	Kewan Lacy	Ole Miss	RB	Jr.	
Walter Camp Award	LaNorris Sellers	South Carolina	QB	R-Jr.	
Walter Camp Award	Dylan Stewart	South Carolina	DE	Jr.	
Walter Camp Award	DeSean Bishop	Tennessee	RB	R-Jr.	
Walter Camp Award	Rasheem Biles	Texas	LB	Sr.	
Walter Camp Award	Cam Coleman	Texas	WR	Jr.	
Walter Camp Award	Arch Manning	Texas	QB	R-Jr.	
Walter Camp Award	Colin Simmons	Texas	DE	Jr.	
Walter Camp Award	Mario Craver	Texas A&M	WR	Jr.	
Walter Camp Award	Marcel Reed	Texas A&M	QB	R-Jr.	
Doak Walker Award	Sutton Smith	Arkansas	RB	R-Sr.	
Doak Walker Award	Jadan Baugh	Florida	RB	Jr.	
Doak Walker Award	Ahmad Hardy	Missouri	RB	Jr.	
Doak Walker Award	Kewan Lacy	Ole Miss	RB	Jr.	
Doak Walker Award	Matt Fuller	South Carolina	RB	R-So.	
Doak Walker Award	Raleek Brown	Texas	RB	R-Sr.	
Doak Walker Award	Hollywood Smothers	Texas	RB	R-Jr.	
Biletnikoff Award	Ryan Coleman-Williams	Alabama	WR	Jr.	
Biletnikoff Award	Keshaun Singleton	Auburn	WR	R-Jr.	
Biletnikoff Award	Tre' Brown III	LSU	WR	R-Sr.	
Biletnikoff Award	Jackson Harris	LSU	WR	R-Jr.	
Biletnikoff Award	Anthony Evans III	Mississippi State	WR	Sr.	
Biletnikoff Award	Trell Harris	Oklahoma	WR	R-Sr.	
Biletnikoff Award	Isaiah Sategna III	Oklahoma	WR	R-Sr.	
Biletnikoff Award	Mike Matthews	Tennessee	WR	Jr.	
Biletnikoff Award	Braylon Staley	Tennessee	WR	R-So.	
Biletnikoff Award	Cam Coleman	Texas	WR	Jr.	
Biletnikoff Award	Ryan Wingo	Texas	WR	Jr.	
Biletnikoff Award	Mario Craver	Texas A&M	WR	Jr.	
Biletnikoff Award	Junior Sherrill	Vanderbilt	WR	Sr.	
Johnny Unitas Golden Arm Award	Byrum Brown	Auburn	QB	Sr.	
Johnny Unitas Golden Arm Award	Gunner Stockton	Georgia	QB	R-Sr.	
Johnny Unitas Golden Arm Award	Sam Leavitt	LSU	QB	R-Jr.	
Johnny Unitas Golden Arm Award	John Mateer	Oklahoma	QB	R-Sr.	
Johnny Unitas Golden Arm Award	LaNorris Sellers	South Carolina	QB	R-Jr.	
Johnny Unitas Golden Arm Award	Arch Manning	Texas	QB	R-Jr.	
Johnny Unitas Golden Arm Award	Marcel Reed	Texas A&M	QB	R-Jr.	
Davey O'Brien Award	Byrum Brown	Auburn	QB	Sr.	
Davey O'Brien Award	Gunner Stockton	Georgia	QB	R-Sr.	
Davey O'Brien Award	Sam Leavitt	LSU	QB	R-Jr.	
Davey O'Brien Award	John Mateer	Oklahoma	QB	R-Sr.	
Davey O'Brien Award	Trinidad Chambliss	Ole Miss	QB	R-Sr.	
Davey O'Brien Award	Arch Manning	Texas	QB	R-Jr.	
Davey O'Brien Award	Marcel Reed	Texas A&M	QB	R-Jr.	
Comeback Player of the Year Award	Jah-Marien Latham	Alabama	LB	Gr.	
Comeback Player of the Year Award	Jeremiah Beaman	Alabama	DL	Jr.	
Comeback Player of the Year Award	Champ Anthony	Auburn	S	Sr.	
Comeback Player of the Year Award	Chas Nimrod	Auburn	WR	R-Sr.	
Comeback Player of the Year Award	LJ McCray	Florida	DL	R-So.	
Comeback Player of the Year Award	Ethan Barbour	Georgia	TE	So.	
Comeback Player of the Year Award	Jordan Hall	Georgia	DL	Sr.	
Comeback Player of the Year Award	Aaron Gates	Kentucky	DB	Sr.	
Comeback Player of the Year Award	CJ Baxter	Kentucky	RB	R-Jr.	
Comeback Player of the Year Award	Sam Greene	Kentucky	OLB	R-Jr.	
Comeback Player of the Year Award	Sam Leavitt	LSU	QB	R-Jr.	
Comeback Player of the Year Award	Whit Weeks	LSU	LB	Sr.	
Comeback Player of the Year Award	Ahmad Hardy	Missouri	RB	Jr.	
Comeback Player of the Year Award	Jahil Florence	Missouri	CB	R-Sr.	
Comeback Player of the Year Award	Jayden Gibson	South Carolina	WR	R-Sr.	
Comeback Player of the Year Award	Andre Cojoe	Texas	OL	R-Jr.	
Polynesian College Football Player Of The Year Award	Sione Laulea	Missouri	CB	R-Sr.	
Polynesian College Football Player Of The Year Award	Jayden Jackson	Oklahoma	NG	Jr.	
Polynesian College Football Player Of The Year Award	Brandon Baker	Texas	RG	Jr.	
Polynesian College Football Player Of The Year Award	Helaman Casuga	Texas A&M	QB	Fr.	
Polynesian College Football Player Of The Year Award	Mark Nabou Jr.	Texas A&M	C	Gr.	
Bednarik Award	Bray Hubbard	Alabama	S	Sr.	
Bednarik Award	Zabien Brown	Alabama	CB	Jr.	
Bednarik Award	Yhonzae Pierre	Alabama	LB	R-Sr.	
Bednarik Award	Quincy Rhodes Jr.	Arkansas	DE	Sr.	
Bednarik Award	Xavier Atkins	Auburn	LB	Jr.	
Bednarik Award	Myles Graham	Florida	LB	Jr.	
Bednarik Award	Raylen Wilson	Georgia	LB	Sr.	
Bednarik Award	Ellis Robinson IV	Georgia	CB	R-So.	
Bednarik Award	KJ Bolden	Georgia	S	Jr.	
Bednarik Award	Princewill Umanmielen	LSU	DE	Sr.	
Bednarik Award	Whit Weeks	LSU	LB	Sr.	
Bednarik Award	DJ Pickett	LSU	CB	So.	
Bednarik Award	Kelley Jones	Mississippi State	CB	R-Jr.	
Bednarik Award	David Stone	Oklahoma	DT	Jr.	
Bednarik Award	Kip Lewis	Oklahoma	LB	R-Sr.	
Bednarik Award	Peyton Bowen	Oklahoma	S	Sr.	
Bednarik Award	Will Echoles	Ole Miss	NT	Jr.	
Bednarik Award	Keaton Thomas	Ole Miss	LB	R-Sr.	
Bednarik Award	Dylan Stewart	South Carolina	DE	Jr.	
Bednarik Award	Amare Campbell	Tennessee	LB	Sr.	
Bednarik Award	Ty Redmond	Tennessee	CB	So.	
Bednarik Award	Colin Simmons	Texas	DE	Jr.	
Bednarik Award	Rasheem Biles	Texas	LB	Sr.	
Bednarik Award	Dalton Brooks	Texas A&M	S	Sr.	
Manning Award	Byrum Brown	Auburn	QB	Sr.	
Manning Award	Gunner Stockton	Georgia	QB	R-Sr.	
Manning Award	Sam Leavitt	LSU	QB	R-Jr.	
Manning Award	John Mateer	Oklahoma	QB	R-Sr.	
Manning Award	Trinidad Chambliss	Ole Miss	QB	R-Sr.	
Manning Award	LaNorris Sellers	South Carolina	QB	R-Jr.	
Manning Award	Arch Manning	Texas	QB	R-Jr.	
Manning Award	Marcel Reed	Texas A&M	QB	R-Jr.	
Earl Campbell Tyler Rose Award	Jaden Platt	Arkansas	TE	R-Jr.	
Earl Campbell Tyler Rose Award	Bryson Washington	Auburn	RB	R-Jr.	
Earl Campbell Tyler Rose Award	Harrison Moore	Florida	OL	Jr.	
Earl Campbell Tyler Rose Award	Nic Anderson	Kentucky	WR	R-Sr.	
Earl Campbell Tyler Rose Award	Caden Durham	LSU	RB	Jr.	
Earl Campbell Tyler Rose Award	Anthony Evans III	Mississippi State	WR	Sr.	
Earl Campbell Tyler Rose Award	Hayden Hansen	Oklahoma	TE	R-Sr.	
Earl Campbell Tyler Rose Award	John Mateer	Oklahoma	QB	R-Sr.	
Earl Campbell Tyler Rose Award	Michael Fasusi	Oklahoma	OL	So.	
Earl Campbell Tyler Rose Award	Parker Livingstone	Oklahoma	WR	R-So.	
Earl Campbell Tyler Rose Award	Tory Blaylock	Oklahoma	RB	So.	
Earl Campbell Tyler Rose Award	Johntay Cook	Ole Miss	WR	Sr.	
Earl Campbell Tyler Rose Award	Kewan Lacy	Ole Miss	RB	Jr.	
Earl Campbell Tyler Rose Award	Nolan Hay	South Carolina	OL	R-Sr.	
Earl Campbell Tyler Rose Award	Arch Manning	Texas	QB	R-Jr.	
Earl Campbell Tyler Rose Award	Cameron Coleman	Texas	WR	Jr.	
Earl Campbell Tyler Rose Award	Trevor Goosby	Texas	OL	R-Jr.	
Earl Campbell Tyler Rose Award	Marcel Reed	Texas A&M	QB	R-Jr.	
Earl Campbell Tyler Rose Award	Rueben Owens II	Texas A&M	RB	R-Jr.	
Earl Campbell Tyler Rose Award	Terry Bussey	Texas A&M	WR	Jr.	
Earl Campbell Tyler Rose Award	Makhilyn Young	Vanderbilt	RB	Sr.	
Earl Campbell Tyler Rose Award	Sedrick Alexander	Vanderbilt	RB	Sr.	
Shaun Alexander Freshman Player of the Year Award	Ezavier Crowell	Alabama	RB	Fr.	
Shaun Alexander Freshman Player of the Year Award	Jireh Edwards	Alabama	S	Fr.	
Shaun Alexander Freshman Player of the Year Award	Keelon Russell	Alabama	QB	R-Fr.	
Shaun Alexander Freshman Player of the Year Award	Dallas Wilson	Florida	WR	R-Fr.	
Shaun Alexander Freshman Player of the Year Award	Ben Hanks III	Florida	CB	R-Fr.	
Shaun Alexander Freshman Player of the Year Award	Talyn Taylor	Georgia	WR	So.	
Shaun Alexander Freshman Player of the Year Award	Lamar Brown	LSU	DT	Fr.	
Shaun Alexander Freshman Player of the Year Award	Bralan Womack	Mississippi State	S	Fr.	
Shaun Alexander Freshman Player of the Year Award	Caleb Cunningham	Ole Miss	WR	Fr.	
Shaun Alexander Freshman Player of the Year Award	Darius Gray	South Carolina	OL	Fr.	
Shaun Alexander Freshman Player of the Year Award	Faizon Brandon	Tennessee	QB	Fr.	
Shaun Alexander Freshman Player of the Year Award	Tyler Atkinson	Texas	LB	Fr.	
Shaun Alexander Freshman Player of the Year Award	Richard Wesley	Texas	DE	Fr.	
Shaun Alexander Freshman Player of the Year Award	Jermaine Bishop Jr.	Texas	WR	Fr.	
Shaun Alexander Freshman Player of the Year Award	Aaron Gregory	Texas A&M	WR	Fr.	
Shaun Alexander Freshman Player of the Year Award	Jared Curtis	Vanderbilt	QB	Fr.	

==== Preseason All-SEC ====
===== Media =====
First Team

Position	Player	Class	Team
First Team offense
QB	Trinidad Chambliss	Sr.	Ole Miss
RB	Kewan Lacy	Jr.	Ole Miss
RB	Ahmad Hardy	Jr.	Missouri
WR	Cam Coleman	Jr.	Texas
WR	Ryan Coleman-Williams	Jr.	Alabama
TE	Trey'Dez Green	Jr.	LSU
OL	Trevor Goosby	Redshirt Jr.	Texas
OL	Cayden Green	Sr.	Missouri
OL	Jordan Seaton	Jr.	LSU
OL	Earnest Greene III	Redshirt Sr.	Georiga
OL	Drew Bobo	Redshirt Sr.	Georiga
First Team defense
DL	Colin Simmons	Jr.	Texas
DL	Will Echoles	Jr.	Ole Miss
DL	Dylan Stewart	Jr.	South Carolina
DL	Princewill Umanmielen	Sr.	LSU
LB	Whit Weeks	Sr.	LSU
LB	Xavier Atkins	Jr.	Auburn
LB	Rasheem Biles	Sr.	Texas
DB	KJ Bolden	Jr.	Georgia
DB	Ellis Robinson IV	Redshirt So.	Georgia
DB	Zabien Brown	Jr.	Alabama
DB	Bray Hubbard	Sr.	Alabama
First Team Special Teams
PK	Tate Sandell	Redshirt Sr.	Oklahoma
P	Grant Chadwick	Jr.	LSU
LS	Ben Anderson	Redshirt Sr.	Oklahoma
KS	Tate Sandell	Redshirt Sr.	Oklahoma
RS	Ryan Niblett	Redshirt Jr.	Texas
AP	Mario Craver	Jr.	Texas A&M

Second Team

Position	Player	Class	Team
Second Team offense
QB	Arch Manning	Redshirt Jr.	Texas
RB	Jadan Baugh	Jr.	Florida
RB	Nate Frazier	Jr.	Georgia
WR	Mario Craver	Jr.	Texas A&M
WR	Isaiah Sategna III	Redshirt Sr.	Oklahoma
TE	Lawson Luckie	Sr.	Georgia
OL	Dontrell Glover	So.	Georgia
OL	Michael Fasusi	So.	Oklahoma
OL	Michael Carroll	So.	Alabama
OL	Lance Heard	Sr.	Kentucky
OL	Mark Nabou Jr.	Gr.	Texas A&M
Second Team defense
DL	David Stone	Jr.	Oklahoma
DL	Taylor Wein	Redshirt Jr.	Oklahoma
DL	Elijah Griffin	So.	Georgia
DL	Quincy Rhodes Jr.	Sr.	Arkansas
LB	Raylen Wilson	Sr.	Georgia
LB	Suntarine Perkins	Sr.	Ole Miss
LB	Kip Lewis	Redshirt Sr.	Oklahoma
DB	Kelley Jones	Redshirt Jr.	Mississippi State
DB	DJ Pickett	So.	LSU
DB	Ty Benefield	Sr.	LSU
DB	Eli Bowen	Jr.	Oklahoma
DB	Peyton Bowen	Sr.	Oklahoma
Second Team Special Teams
PK	Lucas Carneiro	Redshirt Sr.	Ole Miss
P	Grayson Miller	Redshirt Sr.	Oklahoma
LS	Trey Dubuc	Jr.	Texas
KS	Lucas Carneiro	Redshirt Sr.	Ole Miss
RS	Isaiah Sategna III	Redshirt Sr.	Oklahoma
AP	Ryan Niblett	Redshirt Jr.	Texas

Third Team

Position	Player	Class	Team
Third Team offense
QB	Gunner Stockton	Redshirt Sr.	Georgia
RB	DeSean Bishop	Redshirt Jr.	Tennessee
RB	Hollywood Smothers	Redshirt Jr.	Texas
WR	Ryan Wingo	Jr.	Texas
WR	Nyck Harbor	Sr.	South Carolina
TE	Willie Rodriguez	Jr.	Kentucky
OL	David Sanders Jr.	So.	Tennessee
OL	Wendell Moe Jr.	Redshirt Sr.	Tennessee
OL	Patrick Kutas	Sr.	Ole Miss
OL	Brandon Baker	Jr.	Texas
OL	Braelin Moore	Redshirt Sr.	LSU
Third Team defense
DL	Kam Franklin	Jr.	Ole Miss
DL	DJ Hicks	Sr.	Texas A&M
DL	Gabe Harris	Sr.	Georgia
DL	Jayden Woods	So.	Florida
LB	Arion Carter	Sr.	Tennessee
LB	TJ Dottery	Redshirt Sr.	LSU
LB	Yhonzae Pierre	Redshirt Sr.	Alabama
DB	Keon Sabb	Redshirt Sr.	Alabama
DB	Champ Anthony	Sr.	Auburn
DB	Khalil Barnes	Sr.	Georgia
DB	Jelani McDonald	Sr.	Texas
Third Team Special Teams
PK	Alex McPherson	Redshirt Sr.	Auburn
P	Ethan Pulliam	Jr.	Mississippi State
LS	Brett Le Blanc	Sr.	Missouri
KS	Terry Bussey	Jr.	Texas A&M
RS	Vernell Brown III	So.	Florida
AP	Jadan Baugh	Jr.	Florida

===== Coaches =====
First Team

Position	Player	Class	Team
First Team offense
QB	Trinidad Chambliss	Sr.	Ole Miss
RB	Kewan Lacy	Jr.	Ole Miss
RB	Ahmad Hardy	Jr.	Missouri
WR	Cam Coleman	Jr.	Texas
WR	Mario Craver	Jr.	Texas A&M
TE	Trey'Dez Green	Jr.	LSU
OL	Trevor Goosby	Redshirt Jr.	Texas
OL	Cayden Green	Sr.	Missouri
OL	Jordan Seaton	Jr.	LSU
OL	Earnest Greene III	Redshirt Sr.	Georiga
OL	Drew Bobo	Redshirt Sr.	Georiga
First Team defense
DL	Colin Simmons	Jr.	Texas
DL	Will Echoles	Jr.	Ole Miss
DL	Dylan Stewart	Jr.	South Carolina
DL	Princewill Umanmielen	Sr.	LSU
LB	Whit Weeks	Sr.	LSU
LB	Xavier Atkins	Jr.	Auburn
LB	Rasheem Biles	Sr.	Texas
DB	KJ Bolden	Jr.	Georgia
DB	Ellis Robinson IV	Redshirt So.	Georgia
DB	Zabien Brown	Jr.	Alabama
DB	Bray Hubbard	Sr.	Alabama
First Team Special Teams
PK	Tate Sandell	Redshirt Sr.	Oklahoma
P	Grant Chadwick	Jr.	LSU
LS	Ben Anderson	Redshirt Sr.	Oklahoma
KS	Tate Sandell	Redshirt Sr.	Oklahoma
RS	Ryan Niblett	Redshirt Jr.	Texas
AP	Mario Craver	Jr.	Texas A&M

Second Team

Position	Player	Class	Team
Second Team offense
QB	Arch Manning	Redshirt Jr.	Texas
RB	Jadan Baugh	Jr.	Florida
RB	Nate Frazier	Jr.	Georgia
WR	Ryan Coleman-Williams	Jr.	Alabama
WR	Isaiah Sategna III	Redshirt Sr.	Oklahoma
TE	Lawson Luckie	Sr.	Georgia
OL	Dontrell Glover	So.	Georgia
OL	Michael Fasusi	So.	Oklahoma
OL	Michael Carroll	So.	Alabama
OL	Lance Heard	Sr.	Kentucky
OL	Mark Nabou Jr.	Gr.	Texas A&M
Second Team defense
DL	David Stone	Jr.	Oklahoma
DL	Taylor Wein	Redshirt Jr.	Oklahoma
DL	Elijah Griffin	So.	Georgia
DL	Quincy Rhodes Jr.	Sr.	Arkansas
LB	Raylen Wilson	Sr.	Georgia
LB	Suntarine Perkins	Sr.	Ole Miss
LB	Kip Lewis	Redshirt Sr.	Oklahoma
DB	Kelley Jones	Redshirt Jr.	Mississippi State
DB	DJ Pickett	So.	LSU
DB	Eli Bowen	Jr.	Oklahoma
DB	Peyton Bowen	Sr.	Oklahoma
Second Team Special Teams
PK	Lucas Carneiro	Redshirt Sr.	Ole Miss
P	Grayson Miller	Redshirt Sr.	Oklahoma
LS	Brett Le Blanc	Sr.	Missouri
KS	Lucas Carneiro	Redshirt Sr.	Ole Miss
RS	Isaiah Sategna III	Redshirt Sr.	Oklahoma
AP	Isaiah Sategna III	Redshirt Sr.	Oklahoma

Third Team

Position	Player	Class	Team
Third Team offense
QB	Gunner Stockton	Redshirt Sr.	Georgia
RB	DeSean Bishop	Redshirt Jr.	Tennessee
RB	Hollywood Smothers	Redshirt Jr.	Texas
WR	Ryan Wingo	Jr.	Texas
WR	Nyck Harbor	Sr.	South Carolina
TE	Willie Rodriguez	Jr.	Kentucky
OL	David Sanders Jr.	So.	Tennessee
OL	Wendell Moe Jr.	Redshirt Sr.	Tennessee
OL	Patrick Kutas	Sr.	Ole Miss
OL	Brandon Baker	Jr.	Texas
OL	Braelin Moore	Redshirt Sr.	LSU
Third Team defense
DL	Kam Franklin	Jr.	Ole Miss
DL	DJ Hicks	Sr.	Texas A&M
DL	Gabe Harris	Sr.	Georgia
DL	Jayden Woods	So.	Florida
LB	Arion Carter	Sr.	Tennessee
LB	Robert Woodyard Jr.	Redshirt Jr.	Missouri
LB	Yhonzae Pierre	Redshirt Sr.	Alabama
DB	Keon Sabb	Redshirt Sr.	Alabama
DB	Ty Benefield	Sr.	LSU
DB	Ty Redmond	So.	Tennessee
DB	Jelani McDonald	Sr.	Texas
Third Team Special Teams
PK	Alex McPherson	Redshirt Sr.	Auburn
P	Ethan Pulliam	Jr.	Mississippi State
LS	Trey Dubuc	Redshirt Jr.	Texas
KS	Terry Bussey	Jr.	Texas A&M
RS	Vernell Brown III	So.	Florida
AP	Ryan Niblett	Redshirt Jr.	Texas

== Head coaches ==
=== Pre-season changes ===
Arkansas head coach Sam Pittman was fired during the 2025 season, with seven games left in the regular season. Offensive coordinator Bobby Petrino, who had previously served as head coach of the program from 2008 to 2011, was named interim head coach for the remainder of the season. On November 30, 2025, Memphis head coach Ryan Silverfield was hired to take over their head coaching position beginning in 2026.

Auburn head coach Hugh Freeze was fired during the 2025 season, with three games left in the regular season. Defensive coordinator D. J. Durkin was named interim head coach for the remainder of the season. On November 30, 2025, South Florida head coach Alex Golesh was hired to take over their head coaching position beginning in 2026.

Florida head coach Billy Napier was fired during the 2025 season, with five games left in the regular season. Wide receivers coach Billy Gonzales was named interim head coach for the remainder of the season. On November 30, 2025, Tulane head coach Jon Sumrall was hired to take over their head coaching position beginning in 2026.

Kentucky head coach Mark Stoops was fired after the conclusion of the 2025 season. On December 1, 2025, Oregon offensive coordinator Will Stein was hired to take to over their head coaching position.

LSU head coach Brian Kelly was fired during the 2025 season, with four games left in the regular season. Associate head coach and running backs coach Frank Wilson was named interim head coach for the remainder of the season. On November 30, 2025, Ole Miss head coach Lane Kiffin accepted the head coaching position, and will take over the position beginning in 2026.

Ole Miss head coach Kiffin announced on November 30, 2025, that he was taking the head coaching position at LSU beginning in 2026. Defensive coordinator Pete Golding was named head coach beginning with the 2025 playoffs, with 2026 expected to be his first full season.

=== Coaches ===
Note: All stats current through the completion of the 2026 season. All records are at Division I schools only.

Team	Head coach	Year at school	Overall record	Record at school	SEC record	Conference championships	National championships
Alabama	Kalen DeBoer	3	124–20	20–8	12–4	0	0
Arkansas	Ryan Silverfield	1	50–25	0–0	0–0	0	0
Auburn	Alex Golesh	1	23–15	0–0	0–0	0	0
Florida	Jon Sumrall	1	43–12	0–0	0–0	0	0
Georgia	Kirby Smart	11	117–21	117–21	69–12	3	2
Kentucky	Will Stein	1	0–0	0–0	0–0	0	0
LSU	Lane Kiffin	1	116–53	0–0	0–0	0	0
Mississippi State	Jeff Lebby	3	7–18	7–18	1–15	0	0
Missouri	Eliah Drinkwitz	7	58–30	46–29	26–24	0	0
Oklahoma	Brent Venables	5	32–20	32–20	18–16	0	0
Ole Miss	Pete Golding	1	2–1	2–1	0–0	0	0
South Carolina	Shane Beamer	6	33–30	33–30	16–24	0	0
Tennessee	Josh Heupel	6	73–28	45–20	24–16	0	0
Texas	Steve Sarkisian	6	93–55	48–20	30–13	0	0
Texas A&M	Mike Elko	3	35–16	19–7	12–4	0	0
Vanderbilt	Clark Lea	5	26–37	26–37	11–29	0	0

== Schedules ==
The schedule was released on December 11, 2025. The season will begin on September 5, 2026, and will end with the SEC Championship Game on December 5, 2026.

Index to colors and formatting
SEC member won
SEC member lost
SEC teams in **bold**

Rankings reflect those of the AP poll for weeks 1 through 8. Rankings from Week 9 until the end of the season reflect those of the College Football Playoff Rankings.

=== Week One ===
Date	Time	Visiting team	Home team	Site	TV	Result	Attendance	Ref.
September 3	8:00 p.m.	Arkansas–Pine Bluff	No. 25 **Missouri**	Faurot Field • Columbia, MO	SECN	**W** 54–14	63,609	
September 4	8:00 p.m.	UTEP	No. 10 **Oklahoma**	Gaylord Family Oklahoma Memorial Stadium • Norman, OK	SECN+	**W** 51–0	84,315	
September 5	12:00 p.m.	East Carolina	No. 13 **Alabama**	Bryant–Denny Stadium • Tuscaloosa, AL	ABC	**W** 48–10	100,077	
September 5	12:45 p.m.	Kent State	**South Carolina**	Williams–Brice Stadium • Columbia, SC	SECN	**W** 57–0	77,559	
September 5	1:00 p.m.	No. 9 (FCS) Youngstown State	**Kentucky**	Kroger Field • Lexington, KY	SECN+	**W** 45–13	60,166	
September 5	3:00 p.m.	Tennessee State	No. 3 **Georgia**	Sanford Stadium • Athens, GA	SECN+	**W** 63–3	93,033	
September 5	3:30 p.m.	Baylor	**Auburn**	Mercedes-Benz Stadium • Atlanta, GA (Aflac Kickoff Game)	ABC	**W** 17–16	55,068	
September 5	3:30 p.m.	Furman	No. 20 **Tennessee**	Neyland Stadium • Knoxville, TN	SECN+	**W** 56–9	101,915	
September 5	3:30 p.m.	Texas State	No. 5 **Texas**	Darrell K Royal–Texas Memorial Stadium • Austin, TX	ESPN	**W** 59–7	102,738	
September 5	4:15 p.m.	North Alabama	**Arkansas**	Donald W. Reynolds Razorback Stadium • Fayetteville, AR	SECN	**W** 31–14	69,178	
September 5	7:00 p.m.	No. 15 (FCS) Austin Peay	**Vanderbilt**	FirstBank Stadium • Nashville, TN	SECN+	**W** 28–9	35,000	
September 5	7:00 p.m.	Missouri State	No. 8 **Texas A&M**	Kyle Field • College Station, TX	ESPN	**W** 50–0	107,782	
September 5	7:30 p.m.	Louisiana–Monroe	**Mississippi State**	Davis Wade Stadium • Starkville, MS	ESPNU	**W** 62–13	48,771	
September 5	7:45 p.m.	Florida Atlantic	**Florida**	Ben Hill Griffin Stadium • Gainesville, FL	SECN	**W** 66–21	90,295	
September 5	9:40 p.m. (Note: Start time delayed from 7:30 p.m. due to thunderstorms.)	Clemson	No. 11 **LSU**	Tiger Stadium • Baton Rouge, LA (College GameDay)	ABC	**W** 51-10	102,321	
September 6	7:30 p.m.	No. 24 Louisville	No. 9 **Ole Miss**	Nissan Stadium • Nashville, TN (Music City Kickoff)	ABC	**W** 41–38	57,390	
^{#}Rankings from AP Poll released prior to game. All times are in Eastern Time.

=== Week Two ===
Date	Time	Visiting team	Home team	Site	TV	Result	Attendance	Ref.
September 11	8:00 p.m.	No. 23 **Missouri**	Kansas	David Booth Kansas Memorial Stadium • Lawrence, KS (Border War)	FOX	**W** 38–21	32,000	
September 12	12:00 p.m.	Arizona State	No. 10 **Texas A&M**	Kyle Field • College Station, TX	ABC	**W** 48–20	107,523	
September 12	12:00 p.m.	No. 11 **Oklahoma**	Michigan	Michigan Stadium • Ann Arbor, MI (Big Noon Kickoff)	FOX	**L** 10–17	111,240	
September 12	12:45 p.m.	Western Kentucky	No. 2 **Georgia**	Sanford Stadium • Athens, GA	SECN	**W** 70–20	93,033	
September 12	3:30 p.m.	No. 12 **Alabama**	**Kentucky**	Kroger Field • Lexington, KY	ABC	**ALA** 45–17	61,820	
September 12	3:30 p.m.	**Mississippi State**	Minnesota	Huntington Bank Stadium • Minneapolis, MN	CBS	**W** 38–13	48,048	
September 12	4:15 p.m.	Delaware	**Vanderbilt**	FirstBank Stadium • Nashville, TN	SECN	**W** 35–26	35,000	
September 12	5:30 p.m.	Campbell	**Florida**	Ben Hill Griffin Stadium • Gainesville, FL	SECN+	**W** 52–3	88,863	
September 12	7:00 p.m.	No. 18 **Tennessee**	Georgia Tech	Bobby Dodd Stadium • Atlanta, GA (rivalry)	ESPN	**W** 45–24	52,113	
September 12	7:00 p.m.	Towson	**South Carolina**	Williams–Brice Stadium • Columbia, SC	SECN+	**W** 45–9	78,399	
September 12	7:30 p.m.	No. 1 Ohio State	No. 4 **Texas**	Darrell K Royal–Texas Memorial Stadium • Austin, TX (College GameDay)	ABC	**W** 24–23	105,044	
September 12	7:30 p.m.	Louisiana Tech	No. 8 **LSU**	Tiger Stadium • Baton Rouge, LA	SECN+	**W** 45–14	102,321	
September 12	7:45 p.m.	Southern Miss	**Auburn**	Jordan–Hare Stadium • Auburn, AL	SECN	**W** 43–8	88,043	
September 12	7:45 p.m.	Charlotte	No. 9 **Ole Miss**	Vaught–Hemingway Stadium • Oxford, MS	ESPN2	**W** 41–9	68,134	
September 12	10:15 p.m.	**Arkansas**	No. 20 Utah	Rice–Eccles Stadium • Salt Lake City, UT	ESPN	**L** 10–43	51,532	
^{#}Rankings from AP Poll released prior to game. All times are in Eastern Time.

=== Week Three ===
Date	Time	Visiting team	Home team	Site	TV	Result	Attendance	Ref.
September 19	12:00 p.m.	No. 2 **Georgia**	**Arkansas**	Donald W. Reynolds Razorback Stadium • Fayetteville, AR	ABC	**UGA** 45–17	66,123	
September 19	12:45 p.m.	NC State	**Vanderbilt**	FirstBank Stadium • Nashville, TN	SECN	**W** 35–31	35,000	
September 19	3:30 p.m.	Florida State	No. 10 **Alabama**	Bryant–Denny Stadium • Tuscaloosa, AL	ABC	**W** 50–36	100,077	
September 19	3:30 p.m.	**Kentucky**	No. 9 **Texas A&M**	Kyle Field • College Station, TX	ESPN	**UK** 31–21	105,186	
September 19	4:15 p.m.	**Mississippi State**	**South Carolina**	Williams–Brice Stadium • Columbia, SC	SECN	**MSST** 41–34	78,360	
September 19	7:00 p.m.	**Florida**	**Auburn**	Jordan–Hare Stadium • Auburn, AL (rivalry)	ESPN	**FLA** 44–39	88,043	
September 19	7:00 p.m.	Troy	No. 20 **Missouri**	Faurot Field • Columbia, MO	SECN+	**W** 27–17	63,609	
September 19	7:30 p.m.	No. 8 **LSU**	No. 7 **Ole Miss**	Vaught–Hemingway Stadium • Oxford, MS (Magnolia Bowl)	ABC	**MISS** 34–26	70,033	
September 19	7:30 p.m.	New Mexico	No. 24 **Oklahoma**	Gaylord Family Oklahoma Memorial Stadium • Norman, OK	ESPN2	**W** 14–6	83,423	
September 19	7:45 p.m.	Kennesaw State	No. 15 **Tennessee**	Neyland Stadium • Knoxville, TN	SECN	**W** 42–9	101,915	
September 19	8:00 p.m.	UTSA	No. 1 **Texas**	Darrell K Royal–Texas Memorial Stadium • Austin, TX	SECN+	**W** 30–6	103,753	
^{#}Rankings from AP Poll released prior to game. All times are in Eastern Time.

=== Week Four ===
Date	Time	Visiting team	Home team	Site	TV	Result	Attendance	Ref.
September 26	12:00 p.m.	No. 1 **Texas**	No. 14 **Tennessee**	Neyland Stadium • Knoxville, TN	ABC	**TEX** 20–17	101,915	
September 26	12:45 p.m.	South Alabama	**Kentucky**	Kroger Field • Lexington, KY	SECN	**W** 45–21	61,127	
September 26	3:30 p.m.	No. 4 **Ole Miss**	No. 21 **Florida**	Ben Hill Griffin Stadium • Gainesville, FL	ABC	**FLA** 52–28	90,683	
September 26	3:30 p.m.	**Oklahoma**	No. 2 **Georgia**	Sanford Stadium • Athens, GA	ESPN	**UGA** 41–13	93,033	
September 26	4:15 p.m.	**Vanderbilt**	**Auburn**	Jordan–Hare Stadium • Auburn, AL	SECN	**AUB** 21–15	88,043	
September 26	7:00 p.m.	**South Carolina**	No. 8 **Alabama**	Bryant–Denny Stadium • Tuscaloosa, AL	ESPN	**ALA** 49–18	100,077	
September 26	7:30 p.m.	No. 23 **Texas A&M**	No. 10 **LSU**	Tiger Stadium • Baton Rouge, LA (rivalry)	ABC	**LSU** 35–6	102,321	
September 26	7:45 p.m.	No. 19 **Missouri**	No. 24 **Mississippi State**	Davis Wade Stadium • Starkville, MS	SECN	**MSST** 31–24	60,417	
September 26	8:00 p.m.	Tulsa	**Arkansas**	Donald W. Reynolds Razorback Stadium • Fayetteville, AR	SECN+	**W** 34–6	72,890	
^{#}Rankings from AP Poll released prior to game. All times are in Eastern Time.

=== Week Five ===
Date	Time	Visiting team	Home team	Site	TV	Result	Attendance	Ref.
October 3	12:00 p.m.	No. 7 **Alabama**	No. 16 **Mississippi State**	Davis Wade Stadium • Starkville, MS (rivalry)	ABC	**ALA** 56–23	60,417	
October 3	12:45 p.m.	**Vanderbilt**	No. 2 **Georgia**	Sanford Stadium • Athens, GA (rivalry)	SECN	**UGA** 38–14	93,033	
October 3	3:30 p.m.	No. 8 **Florida**	No. 25 **Missouri**	Faurot Field • Columbia, MO	ABC	**MIZ** 45–17	63,609	
October 3	3:30 p.m.	**Auburn**	No. 17 **Tennessee**	Neyland Stadium • Knoxville, TN (rivalry)	ESPN	**TENN** 24–14	101,915	
October 3	4:15 p.m.	No. 24 **Kentucky**	**South Carolina**	Williams–Brice Stadium • Columbia, SC	SECN	**UK** 35–34 ^{OT}	77,808	
October 3	7:00 p.m.	**Arkansas**	**Texas A&M**	Kyle Field • College Station, TX (rivalry)	ESPN2	**TAMU** 34–7	108,657	
October 3	7:45 p.m.	McNeese	No. 11 **LSU**	Tiger Stadium • Baton Rouge, LA	SECN	**W** 63–14	102,321	
^{#}Rankings from AP Poll released prior to game. All times are in Eastern Time.

Date	Bye Week		
October 3	**Oklahoma**	No. 9 **Ole Miss**	No. 1 **Texas**

=== Week Six ===
Date	Time	Visiting team	Home team	Site	TV	Result	Attendance	Ref.
October 10	12:00 p.m.	**Texas A&M**	No. 14 **Missouri**	Faurot Field • Columbia, MO	ABC	**MIZ** 27–6	63,609	
October 10	12:45 p.m.	**South Carolina**	No. 16 **Florida**	Ben Hill Griffin Stadium • Gainesville, FL	SECN	**SC** 38–19	90,311	
October 10	3:30 p.m.	No. 1 **Texas**	**Oklahoma**	Cotton Bowl Stadium • Dallas, TX (Red River Rivalry)	ABC	**OU** 27–24	92,100	
October 10	3:30 p.m.	No. 9 **Ole Miss**	**Vanderbilt**	FirstBank Stadium • Nashville, TN (rivalry)	ESPN	**MISS** 52–17	35,000	
October 10	4:15 p.m.	No. 15 **Tennessee**	**Arkansas**	Donald W. Reynolds Razorback Stadium • Fayetteville, AR	SECN	**TENN** 24–17	69,038	
October 10	7:00 p.m.	No. 10 **LSU**	**Kentucky**	Kroger Field • Lexington, KY	ESPN	**UK** 35–34 ^{OT}	61,897	
October 10	7:30 p.m.	No. 2 **Georgia**	No. 6 **Alabama**	Bryant–Denny Stadium • Tuscaloosa, AL (rivalry)	ABC	**UGA** 20–17	100,077	
^{#}Rankings from AP Poll released prior to game. All times are in Eastern Time.

Date	Bye Week	
October 10	**Auburn**	No. 17 **Mississippi State**

=== Week Seven ===
Date	Time	Visiting team	Home team	Site	TV	Result	Attendance	Ref.
October 17	12:00 p.m.	**Florida**	No. 7 **Texas**	Darrell K Royal–Texas Memorial Stadium • Austin, TX	ABC	**FLA** 27–24	103,989	
October 17	12:00 p.m.	No. 16 **Mississippi State**	No. 22 **LSU**	Tiger Stadium • Baton Rouge, LA (rivalry)	ESPN	**LSU** 31–0	102,321	
October 17	1:00 p.m.	The Citadel	**Texas A&M**	Kyle Field • College Station, TX	SECN+	**W** 41–0	101,052	
October 17	3:30 p.m.	No. 6 **Alabama**	No. 14 **Tennessee**	Neyland Stadium • Knoxville, TN (Third Saturday in October)	ABC	**TENN** 26–10	101,915	
October 17	3:30 p.m.	**Auburn**	No. 1 **Georgia**	Sanford Stadium • Athens, GA (Deep South's Oldest Rivalry)	ESPN	**AUB** 27–24	93,033	
October 17	3:30 p.m.	No. 13 **Missouri**	No. 9 **Ole Miss**	Vaught–Hemingway Stadium • Oxford, MS	SECN	**MISS** 31–3	67,510	
October 17	7:00 p.m.	**Arkansas**	**Vanderbilt**	FirstBank Stadium • Nashville, TN	ESPN2	**ARK** 31–21	35,000	
October 17	7:30 p.m.	No. 15 **Kentucky**	**Oklahoma**	Gaylord Family Oklahoma Memorial Stadium • Norman, OK	SECN	**UK** 21–13	83,218	
^{#}Rankings from AP Poll released prior to game. All times are in Eastern Time.

Date	Bye Week
October 17	**South Carolina**

=== Week Eight ===
Date	Time	Visiting team	Home team	Site	TV	Result	Attendance	Ref.
October 24	12:00 p.m.	No. 18 **LSU**	**Auburn**	Jordan–Hare Stadium • Auburn, AL (Tiger Bowl)	ABC	**LSU** 38–17	88,043	
October 24	3:30 p.m.	**Texas A&M**	No. 13 **Alabama**	Bryant–Denny Stadium • Tuscaloosa, AL	ABC	**ALA** 31–20	100,077	
October 24	3:30 p.m.	No. 11 **Tennessee**	**South Carolina**	Williams–Brice Stadium • Columbia, SC	ESPN	**SC** 27–24	79,193	
October 24	3:30 p.m.	**Oklahoma**	**Mississippi State**	Davis Wade Stadium • Starkville, MS	SECN	**OU** 23–15	49,224	
October 24	7:30 p.m.	No. 7 **Ole Miss**	No. 19 **Texas**	Darrell K Royal–Texas Memorial Stadium • Austin, TX	ABC	**TEX** 34–27	104,306	
October 24	7:30 p.m.	**Vanderbilt**	No. 12 **Kentucky**	Kroger Field • Lexington, KY (rivalry)	SECN	**UK** 34–17	61,843	
^{#}Rankings from AP Poll released prior to game. All times are in Eastern Time.

Date	Bye Week			
October 24	**Arkansas**	No. 20 **Florida**	No. 5 **Georgia**	No. 22 **Missouri**

=== Week Nine ===
Date	Time	Visiting team	Home team	Site	TV	Result	Attendance	Ref.
October 31	12:45 p.m.	**Auburn**	No. 12 **Ole Miss**	Vaught–Hemingway Stadium • Oxford, MS (rivalry)	SECN	**MISS** 45–15	67,041	
October 31	3:30 p.m.	No. 17 **Florida**	No. 3 **Georgia**	Mercedes-Benz Stadium • Atlanta, GA (rivalry)	ABC	**UGA** 27–8	72,541	
October 31	4:15 p.m.	**South Carolina**	**Oklahoma**	Gaylord Family Oklahoma Memorial Stadium • Norman, OK	SECN	**SC** 42–25	83,189	
October 31	7:30 p.m.	**Mississippi State**	No. 11 **Texas**	Darrell K Royal–Texas Memorial Stadium • Austin, TX	ESPN	**TEX** 31–3	103,586	
October 31	7:45 p.m.	No. 23 **Missouri**	**Arkansas**	Donald W. Reynolds Razorback Stadium • Fayetteville, AR (Battle Line Rivalry)	SECN	**MIZ** 34–10	65,117	
^{#}Rankings from AP Poll released prior to game. All times are in Eastern Time.

Date	Bye Week					
October 31	No. 10 **Alabama**	No. 9 **Kentucky**	No. 15 **LSU**	No. 16 **Tennessee**	**Texas A&M**	**Vanderbilt**

=== Week Ten ===
Date	Time	Visiting team	Home team	Site	TV	Result	Attendance	Ref.
November 7	12:00 p.m.	No. 7 **Texas**	No. 18 **Missouri**	Faurot Field • Columbia, MO	ESPN	**TEX** 34–20		
November 7	12:45 p.m.	**Arkansas**	**Auburn**	Jordan–Hare Stadium • Auburn, AL	SECN	**AUB** 26–23		
November 7	3:00 p.m.	**Texas A&M**	No. 21 **South Carolina**	Williams–Brice Stadium • Columbia, SC	ESPN	**SC** 17–9		
November 7	3:30 p.m.	No. 5 **Alabama**	No. 14 **LSU**	Tiger Stadium • Baton Rouge, LA (rivalry)	ABC	**ALA** 31–13		
November 7	4:15 p.m.	**Vanderbilt**	**Mississippi State**	Davis Wade Stadium • Starkville, MS	SECN	**VAN** 25–23		
November 7	6:15 p.m.	No. 6 **Kentucky**	No. 13 **Tennessee**	Neyland Stadium • Knoxville, TN (rivalry)	ESPN	**TENN** 34–6		
November 7	7:30 p.m.	No. 2 **Georgia**	No. 10 **Ole Miss**	Vaught–Hemingway Stadium • Oxford, MS	ABC	**UGA** 42–7		
November 7	7:45 p.m.	**Oklahoma**	No. 24 **Florida**	Ben Hill Griffin Stadium • Gainesville, FL	SECN	**OU** 23–7		
^{#}Rankings from College Football Playoff. All times are in Eastern Time.

=== Week Eleven ===
Date	Time	Visiting team	Home team	Site	TV	Result	Attendance	Ref.
November 14	12:45 p.m.	No. 3 **Alabama**	**Vanderbilt**	FirstBank Stadium • Nashville, TN	SECN	**ALA** 21–6		
November 14	3:00 p.m.	No. 8 **Tennessee**	**Texas A&M**	Kyle Field • College Station, TX	ESPN	**TENN** 22–7		
November 14	3:30 p.m.	No. 22 **Missouri**	No. 1 **Georgia**	Sanford Stadium • Athens, GA	ABC	**UGA** 48–21		
November 14	4:15 p.m.	**Auburn**	**Mississippi State**	Davis Wade Stadium • Starkville, MS	SECN	**AUB** 41–9		
November 14	6:15 p.m.	**Florida**	No. 11 **Kentucky**	Kroger Field • Lexington, KY (rivalry)	ESPN	**FLA** 21–14		
November 14	7:30 p.m.	No. 5 **Texas**	No. 21 **LSU**	Tiger Stadium • Baton Rouge, LA	ABC	**TEX** 22–21		
November 14	7:45 p.m.	No. 17 **South Carolina**	**Arkansas**	Donald W. Reynolds Razorback Stadium • Fayetteville, AR	SECN	**ARK** 34–6		
November 15	1:00 p.m.	No. 19 **Ole Miss**	**Oklahoma**	Gaylord Family Oklahoma Memorial Stadium • Norman, OK	SECN	**OU** 24–17		
^{#}Rankings from College Football Playoff. All times are in Eastern Time.

=== Week Twelve ===
Date	Time	Visiting team	Home team	Site	TV	Result	Attendance	Ref.
November 21	12:00 p.m.	**Vanderbilt**	Florida	Ben Hill Griffin Stadium • Gainesville, FL	SECN	**FLA** 34-27		
November 21	12:00 p.m.	Wofford	Ole Miss	Vaught–Hemingway Stadium • Oxford, MS	ESPN+/SECN+	**MISS** 59-17		
November 21	1:00 p.m.	Tennessee Tech	Mississippi State	Davis Wade Stadium • Starkville, MS	ESPN+/SECN+	**MSST** 34-16		
November 21	2:00 p.m.	Chattanooga	Alabama	Bryant–Denny Stadium • Tuscaloosa, AL	ESPN+/SECN+	**ALA** 47-0		
November 21	3:30 p.m.	**LSU**	Tennessee	Neyland Stadium • Knoxville, TN	ABC	**TENN** 27-13		
November 21	3:30 p.m.	**Arkansas**	Texas	Darrell K Royal–Texas Memorial Stadium • Austin, TX (rivalry)	ESPN	**TEX** 45-3		
November 21	3:30 p.m.	Samford	Auburn	Jordan–Hare Stadium • Auburn, AL	SECN	**AUB** 59-17		
November 21	3:45 p.m.	**Texas A&M**	Oklahoma	Gaylord Family Oklahoma Memorial Stadium • Norman, OK	ESPN2	**OU** 28-7		
November 21	7:30 p.m.	**Georgia**	South Carolina	Williams–Brice Stadium • Columbia, SC (rivalry)	ABC	**UGA** 34-6		
November 21	7:30 p.m.	**Kentucky**	Missouri	Faurot Field • Columbia, MO	SECN	**MIZ** 28-14		
^{#}Rankings from College Football Playoff. All times are in Eastern Time.

=== Week Thirteen ===
Date	Time	Visiting team	Home team	Site	TV	Result	Attendance	Ref.
November 27	12:00 p.m.	**Mississippi State**	**Ole Miss**	Vaught–Hemingway Stadium • Oxford, MS (Egg Bowl)	ABC			
November 27	3:30 p.m.	**Florida**	Florida State	Doak Campbell Stadium • Tallahassee, FL (Sunshine Showdown)	ABC			
November 27	7:30 p.m.	**Texas**	**Texas A&M**	Kyle Field • College Station, TX (Lone Star Showdown)	ABC			
November 28	12:00 p.m.	Louisville	**Kentucky**	Kroger Field • Lexington, KY (Governor's Cup)	ESPN2			
November 28	12:45 p.m.	**LSU**	**Arkansas**	Donald W. Reynolds Razorback Stadium • Fayetteville, AR (rivalry)	SECN			
November 28	3:00 p.m.	**South Carolina**	Clemson	Memorial Stadium • Clemson, SC (rivalry)	ESPN2			
November 28	3:30 p.m.	Georgia Tech	**Georgia**	Sanford Stadium • Athens, GA (Clean, Old-Fashioned Hate)	ABC			
November 28	4:15 p.m.	**Oklahoma**	**Missouri**	Faurot Field • Columbia, MO (rivalry)	SECN			
November 28	7:00 p.m.	**Tennessee**	**Vanderbilt**	FirstBank Stadium • Nashville, TN (rivalry)	ESPN			
November 28	7:30 p.m.	**Auburn**	**Alabama**	Bryant–Denny Stadium • Tuscaloosa, AL (Iron Bowl)	ABC			
^{#}Rankings from College Football Playoff. All times are in Eastern Time.

=== SEC Championship Game ===
Date	Time	Visiting team	Home team	Site	TV	Result	Attendance	Ref.
December 5	4:00 p.m.			Mercedes-Benz Stadium • Atlanta, GA	ABC			
^{#}Rankings from College Football Playoff. All times are in Eastern Time.

== Head to head matchups ==
2026 SEC head to head matchups
Team	Alabama	Arkansas	Auburn	Florida	Georgia	Kentucky	LSU	Missouri	Mississippi State	Oklahoma	Ole Miss	South Carolina	Tennessee	Texas	Texas A&M	Vanderbilt
vs. Alabama	—	×		×	20–17	17–45		×	23–56	×	×	18–49	26–10	×	20–31	
vs. Arkansas	×	—		×	45–17	×			×	×	×		24–17		34–7	21–31
vs. Auburn			—	44–39	24–27	×	38–17	×		×		×	24–14	×	×	15–21
vs. Florida	×	×	39–44	—			×	45–17	×		28–52	38–19	×	24–27	×	
vs. Georgia	17–20	17–45	27–24		—	×	×		×	13–41			×	×	×	14–38
vs. Kentucky	45–17	×	×		×	—	34–35		×	13–21	×	34–45		×	21–31	17–34
vs. LSU	31–13		17–38	×	×	35–34	—	×	0–31	×	32–24	×			6–35	×
vs. Missouri	×		×	17–45			×	—	31–24		31–3	×	×		6–27	×
vs. Mississippi State	56–23	×		×	×	×	31–0	24–31	—	23–15		34–41	×		×	
vs. Oklahoma	×	×	×		41–13	21–13	×		15–23	—			×	24–27		×
vs. Ole Miss	×	×		52–28		×	24–32	3–31			—	×	×	34–27	×	17–52
vs. South Carolina	49–18		×	19–38		35–34	×	×	41–34		×	—	24–27	×		×
vs. Tennessee	10–26	17–24	14–24	×	×			×	×	×	×	27–24	—	20–17		
vs. Texas	×		×	27–24	×	×				27–24	27–34	×	17–20	—		×
vs. Texas A&M	31–20	7–34	×	×	×	31–21	35–6	27–6	×		×				—	×
vs. Vanderbilt	21–6	31–21	21–15		38–14	34–17	×	×		×	52–17	×		×	×	—
Total	6–2	1–5	3–4	3–4	7–1	5–2	3–3	3–4	2–5	3–3	4–3	4–3	5–2	4–2	1–6	0–6
	ALA	ARK	AUB	FLA	UGA	UK	LSU	MIZ	MSST	OU	MISS	SC	TENN	TEX	TAMU	VAN

× – Matchup not played in 2026
Updated after Week 8.

== SEC vs other conferences ==
=== SEC vs Power Four matchups ===
The following games include SEC teams competing against Power Four teams from the ACC, Big Ten, Big 12, and Notre Dame. All rankings are from the AP Poll at the time of the game.

Date	Conference	Visitor	Home	Site	Score
September 5	Big 12	Baylor	Auburn†	Mercedes-Benz Stadium • Atlanta, GA	W 17–16
September 5	ACC	Clemson	11 LSU	Tiger Stadium • Baton Rouge, LA	W 51–10
September 6	ACC	24 Louisville	9 Ole Miss†	Nissan Stadium • Nashville, TN	W 41–38
September 11	Big 12	23 Missouri	Kansas	David Booth Kansas Memorial Stadium • Lawrence, KS (Border War)	W 38–21
September 12	Big Ten	Mississippi State	Minnesota	Huntington Bank Stadium • Minneapolis, MN	W 38–13
September 12	Big 12	Arizona State	10 Texas A&M	Kyle Field • College Station, TX	W 48–20
September 12	Big Ten	11 Oklahoma	Michigan	Michigan Stadium • Ann Arbor, MI	L 10–17
September 12	ACC	18 Tennessee	Georgia Tech	Bobby Dodd Stadium • Atlanta, GA	W 45–24
September 12	Big Ten	1 Ohio State	4 Texas	Darrell K Royal–Texas Memorial Stadium • Austin, TX	W 24–23
September 12	Big 12	Arkansas	20 Utah	Rice-Eccles Stadium • Salt Lake City, UT	L 10–43
September 19	ACC	Florida State	10 Alabama	Bryant-Denny Stadium • Tuscaloosa, AL	W 50–36
September 19	ACC	NC State	Vanderbilt	FirstBank Stadium • Nashville, TN	W 35–31
November 28	ACC	Georgia Tech	Georgia	Sanford Stadium • Athens, GA (rivalry)	
November 28	ACC	Florida	Florida State	Doak Campbell Stadium • Tallahassee, FL (rivalry)	
November 28	ACC	Louisville	Kentucky	Kroger Field • Lexington, KY (rivalry)	
November 28	ACC	South Carolina	Clemson	Memorial Stadium • Clemson, SC (rivalry)	

Note: † denotes neutral site game.

Updated after Week 7.

=== SEC vs Group of Six matchups ===
The following games include SEC teams competing against "Group of Six" teams from the American, CUSA, MAC, Mountain West, Pac-12 and Sun Belt.

Date	Conference	Visitor	Home	Site	Score
September 4	Mountain West	UTEP	10 Oklahoma	Gaylord Family Oklahoma Memorial Stadium • Norman, OK	W 51–0
September 5	American	East Carolina	13 Alabama	Bryant–Denny Stadium • Tuscaloosa, AL	W 48–10
September 5	American	Florida Atlantic	Florida	Ben Hill Griffin Stadium • Gainesville, FL	W 66–21
September 5	Sun Belt	Louisiana–Monroe	Mississippi State	Davis Wade Stadium • Starkville, MS	W 62–13
September 5	MAC	Kent State	South Carolina	Williams–Brice Stadium • Columbia, SC	W 57–0
September 5	Pac-12	Texas State	5 Texas	Darrell K Royal–Texas Memorial Stadium • Austin, TX	W 59–7
September 5	CUSA	Missouri State	8 Texas A&M	Kyle Field • College Station, TX	W 50–0
September 12	CUSA	Western Kentucky	2 Georgia	Sanford Stadium • Athens, GA	W 70–20
September 12	Sun Belt	Southern Miss	Auburn	Jordan–Hare Stadium • Auburn, AL	W 43–8
September 12	Sun Belt	Louisiana Tech	8 LSU	Tiger Stadium • Baton Rouge, LA	W 45–14
September 12	American	Charlotte	9 Ole Miss	Vaught–Hemingway Stadium • Oxford, MS	W 41–9
September 12	CUSA	Delaware	Vanderbilt	FirstBank Stadium • Nashville, TN	W 35–26
September 19	Sun Belt	Troy	20 Missouri	Faurot Field • Columbia, MO	W 27–17
September 19	Mountain West	New Mexico	24 Oklahoma	Gaylord Family Oklahoma Memorial Stadium • Norman, OK	W 14–6
September 19	CUSA	Kennesaw State	15 Tennessee	Neyland Stadium • Knoxville, TN	W 42–9
September 19	American	UTSA	1 Texas	Darrell K Royal–Texas Memorial Stadium • Austin, TX	W 30–6
September 26	American	Tulsa	Arkansas	Donald W. Reynolds Razorback Stadium • Fayetteville, AR	W 34–6
September 26	Sun Belt	South Alabama	Kentucky	Kroger Field • Lexington, KY	W 45–21

=== SEC vs FCS matchups ===
The Football Championship Subdivision comprises 13 conferences and two independent programs. The following games include SEC teams competing against FCS teams from the CAA, Missouri Valley, Ohio Valley, Southern, Southland, SWAC, and UAC.

Date	Conference	Visitor	Home	Site	Score
September 3	SWAC	Arkansas-Pine Bluff	25 Missouri	Faurot Field • Columbia, MO	W 54–14
September 5	UAC	Austin Peay	Vanderbilt	FirstBank Stadium • Nashville, TN	W 28–9
September 5	Southern	Furman	20 Tennessee	Neyland Stadium • Knoxville, TN	W 56–9
September 5	UAC	North Alabama	Arkansas	Donald W. Reynolds Razorback Stadium • Fayetteville, AR	W 31–14
September 5	Ohio Valley	Tennessee State	3 Georgia	Sanford Stadium • Athens, GA	W 63–3
September 5	Missouri Valley	Youngstown State	Kentucky	Kroger Field • Lexington, KY	W 45–13
September 12	CAA	Campbell	Florida	Ben Hill Griffin Stadium • Gainesville, FL	W 52–3
September 12	CAA	Towson	South Carolina	Williams–Brice Stadium • Columbia, SC	W 45–9
October 3	Southland	McNeese	11 LSU	Tiger Stadium • Baton Rouge, LA	W 63–14
October 17	Southern	The Citadel	Texas A&M	Kyle Field • College Station, TX	W 41–0
November 21	Southern	Chattanooga	Alabama	Bryant–Denny Stadium • Tuscaloosa, AL	W 47–0
November 21	Southern	Samford	Auburn	Jordan–Hare Stadium • Auburn, AL	W 59–17
November 21	Southern	Tennessee Tech	Mississippi State	Davis Wade Stadium • Starkville, MS	W 34–16
November 21	Southern	Wofford	Ole Miss	Vaught–Hemingway Stadium • Oxford, MS	W 59–17

Note: † denotes neutral site game.

Updated after Week 7.

=== Record vs. other conferences ===
Regular season

Power 4 Conferences	Record
ACC	5–0
Big Ten	2–1
Big 12	3–1
Notre Dame	0–0
Power 4 total	10–2
Other FBS conferences	Record
American	5–0
CUSA	4–0
Independents (Excluding Notre Dame)	0–0
MAC	1–0
Mountain West	2–0
Pac-12	1–0
Sun Belt	5–0
Other FBS total	18–0
FCS opponents	Record
Football Championship Subdivision	14–0
Total non-conference record	42–2

Post season

Power 4 Conferences	Record
ACC	0–0
Big Ten	0–0
Big 12	0–0
Notre Dame	0–0
Power 4 total	0–0
Other FBS conferences	Record
American	0–0
CUSA	0–0
Independents (Excluding Notre Dame)	0–0
MAC	0–0
Mountain West	0–0
Pac-12	0–0
Sun Belt	0–0
Other FBS total	0–0
Total bowl record	0–0

== Rankings ==
		Pre	Wk 1	Wk 2	Wk 3	Wk 4	Wk 5	Wk 6	Wk 7	Wk 8	Wk 9	Wk 10	Wk 11	Wk 12	Wk 13	Wk 14	Wk 15	Final
Alabama	AP	13	12	10	8	7	6	6	13	10								
Alabama	C	11	12	10	8	7	7	7	13	10								
Alabama	CFP	Not released										5	3	3				
Arkansas	AP	—	—	—	—	—	—	—	—	—								
Arkansas	C	—	—	—	—	—	—	—	—	—								
Arkansas	CFP	Not released										—	—	—				
Auburn	AP	RV	RV	—	—	—	—	—	RV	—								
Auburn	C	RV	RV	RV	—	RV	—	—	RV	RV								
Auburn	CFP	Not released										—	—	—				
Florida	AP	RV	RV	RV	21	8	16	RV	20	17								
Florida	C	RV	т25	RV	22	8	15	RV	24	20								
Florida	CFP	Not released										24	—	24				
Georgia	AP	3	2	2 (3)	2 (3)	2 (6)	2 (6)	1 (66)	5	3								
Georgia	C	3 (7)	2 (7)	2 (15)	2 (16)	2 (17)	2 (20)	1 (60)	4	3								
Georgia	CFP	Not released										2	1	1				
Kentucky	AP	—	—	—	RV	24	RV	15	12	9								
Kentucky	C	—	—	—	RV	RV	25	17	12	8								
Kentucky	CFP	Not released										6	11	16				
LSU	AP	11	8 (5)	7 (1)	10	11	10	22	18	15								
LSU	C	13	8	7 (1)	11	11	10	21	17	13								
LSU	CFP	Not released										14	21	—				
Mississippi State	AP	—	—	RV	24	16	17	16	RV	—								
Mississippi State	C	—	—	RV	RV	16	20	19	RV	—								
Mississippi State	CFP	Not released										—	—	—				
Missouri	AP	25	23	20	19	25	14	13	22	23								
Missouri	C	25	23	22	21	25	16	13	21	23								
Missouri	CFP	Not released										18	22	—				
Oklahoma	AP	10	11	24	RV	—	—	RV	—	—								
Oklahoma	C	9	10	21	RV	RV	—	RV	—	RV								
Oklahoma	CFP	Not released										—	—	22				
Ole Miss	AP	9	9	8	4 (3)	9	9	9	7	12								
Ole Miss	C	10	11	9	6	12	11	10	7	12								
Ole Miss	CFP	Not released										10	19	25				
South Carolina	AP	RV	RV	RV	—	—	—	—	—	RV								
South Carolina	C	RV	RV	RV	—	—	—	—	—	RV								
South Carolina	CFP	Not released										21	17	21				
Tennessee	AP	20	18	15	14	17	15	14	11	16								
Tennessee	C	18	18	14	13	17	14	14	11	17								
Tennessee	CFP	Not released										13	8	9				
Texas	AP	5	4 (2)	1 (56)	1 (58)	1 (62)	1 (61)	7	19	11								
Texas	C	4 (2)	3 (1)	1 (42)	1 (46)	1 (45)	1 (45)	6	18	11								
Texas	CFP	Not released										7	6	5				
Texas A&M	AP	8	10	9	23	—	—	—	—	—								
Texas A&M	C	8	9	8	20	RV	RV	—	—	—								
Texas A&M	CFP	Not released										—	—	—				
Vanderbilt	AP	RV	RV	—	—	—	—	—	—	—								
Vanderbilt	C	RV	RV	RV	RV	—	—	—	—	—								
Vanderbilt	CFP	Not released										—	—	—				

Legend
	Improvement in ranking
	Drop in ranking
	No change in ranking from previous week
RV	Received votes but were not ranked in Top 25 of poll
т	Tied with team above or below also with this symbol

== Television selections ==
The Southeastern Conference has television contracts with ESPN, which allow games to be broadcast across ABC, FOX, NBC, CBS, TNT, ESPN2, ESPNU and SEC Network. Streaming broadcasts for games under SEC control are streamed on ESPN+. Games under the control of other conferences fall under the contracts of the opposing conference.

Network	Wk 1	Wk 2	Wk 3	Wk 4	Wk 5	Wk 6	Wk 7	Wk 8	Wk 9	Wk 10	Wk 11	Wk 12	Wk 13	Wk 14	C	Bowls	NCG	Totals
ABC	4	3	3	3	2	3	2	3	1	2	2	2	5	—	1	–	-	36
ESPN	2	2	2	2	1	2	2	1	1	3	2	1	1	—	–	–	–	22
ESPN2	–	1	1	–	1	–	1	–	–	–	–	1	2	—	–	–	–	7
ESPNU	1	–	–	–	–	–	–	–	–	–	–	–	–	–	–	–	–	1
FOX	–	2	–	–	–	–	–	–	–	–	–	–	–	–	–	–	–	2
FS1	–	–	–	–	–	–	–	–	–	–	–	–	–	–	–	–	–	–
ACC Network	–	–	–	–	–	–	–	–	–	–	–	–	–	–	–	–	–	–
CBS	–	1	–	–	–	–	–	–	–	–	–	–	–	–	–	–	–	1
NBC	–	–	–	–	–	–	–	–	–	–	–	–	–	–	–	–	–	–
The CW	–	–	–	–	–	–	–	–	–	–	–	–	–	–	–	–	–	–
CBS Sports Network	–	–	–	–	–	–	–	–	–	–	–	–	–	–	–	–	–	–
SEC Network	4	3	3	3	3	2	2	2	3	3	4	3	2	–	–	–	–	37
TNT (TruTV, TBS)	–	–	–	–	–	–	–	–	–	–	–	–	–	–	–	–	–	–
ESPN+ (streaming)	5	3	2	1	–	–	1	–	–	–	–	3	–	–	–	–	–	15
TNT Max (streaming)	–	–	–	–	–	–	–	–	–	–	–	–	–	–	–	–	–	–

Platform	Games
Broadcast	31
Cable	44
Streaming	16

== Awards and honors ==
=== Players of the week ===
Week	Offensive Player of the Week			Defensive Player of the Week			Special Teams Player of the Week			Offensive Line Player of the Week			Defensive Line Player of the Week			Freshman Player of the Week		
Week	Player	Team	Position	Player	Team	Position	Player	Team	Position	Player	Team	Position	Player	Team	Position	Player	Team	Position
Week 1 (Sept 7)	Sam Leavitt; Deuce Alexander	LSU; Ole Miss	QB; WR	Eric Winters; Rasheem Biles	Auburn; Texas	S LB	Isaiah Sategna III; Lucas Carneiro	Oklahoma; Ole Miss	WR/PR; PK	Jordan Seaton	LSU	OT	Jordan Ross	LSU	DE	Faizon Brandon	Tennessee	QB
Week 2 (Sept 14)	Arch Manning; Austin Simmons	Texas; Missouri	QB	Caleb Woodson; Luke Metz	Alabama	LB	Vernell Brown III; Vicari Swain	Florida; South Carolina	WR/PR; DB/PR	Canon Boone; Trevor Goosby	Mississippi State; Texas	C OT	Devan Thompkins; Daeden Hopkins	Alabama; Missouri	DE	Faizon Brandon (2)	Tennessee	QB
Week 3 (Sept 21)	Trinidad Chambliss	Ole Miss	QB	Sam Greene	Kentucky	LB	Conor Talty	Alabama	PK	Harrison Moore	Florida	C	Amaree Williams	Mississippi State	DE	Jared Curtis	Vanderbilt	QB
Week 4 (Sept 28)	Jadan Baugh	Florida	RB	Chris Cole	Georgia	LB	London Montgomery	Florida	RB/KR	Bryce Lovett	Florida	OT	Daeden Hopkins (2)	Missouri	DE	Deuce Geralds	LSU	DT
Week 5 (Oct 5)	Austin Simmons (2); DeSean Bishop	Missouri; Tennessee	QB; RB	Dejuan Lane; Nicholas Rodriguez	Tennessee; Missouri	S LB	Jackson Ross; David Olano	Tennessee; Texas A&M	P PK	Lance Heard	Kentucky	OT	London Simmons	Alabama	DT	Xavier Griffin; Kenny Darby	Alabama; Kentucky	LB; WR
Week 6 (Oct 12)	Jamal Roberts; LaNorris Sellers	Missouri; South Carolina	RB; QB	Peyton Bowen	Oklahoma	S	Brock Coffman; Tate Sandell	Kentucky; Oklahoma	WR/PR; PK	Dontrell Glover	Georgia	OG	Joseph Jonah-Ajonye; Dylan Stewart	Georgia; South Carolina	DT; DE	Kenny Darby (2)	Kentucky	WR
Week 7 (Oct 19)	Byrum Brown	Auburn	QB	Jordan Castell	Kentucky	S	Alex McPherson; Cooper Ranvier	Auburn; Tennessee	PK	Patrick Kutas; Kash Courtney	Ole Miss; Arkansas	OG; C	Tyree Weathersby; LJ McCray	Tennessee; Florida	DE	Jake Kreul	Oklahoma	DE
Week 8 (Oct 26)	Sam Leavitt (2)	LSU	QB	Rasheem Biles (2); Owen Heinecke	Texas; Oklahoma	LB	Malik Orsan	South Carolina	PK	Nolan Hay	South Carolina	C	Jordan Ross (2); Fatutoa Henry	LSU; Alabama	DE; DL	Kenny Darby (3)	Kentucky	WR
Week 9 (Nov 2)	LaNorris Sellers (2)	South Carolina	QB	Chris Cole (2); Rasheem Biles (3)	Georgia; Texas	LB	Blake Craig	Missouri	PK	Patrick Kutas (2)	Ole Miss	OG	Gabe Harris Jr. Maraad Watson	Georgia; Texas	DE; DT	Darius Gray	South Carolina	OT
Week 10 (Nov 9)																		
Week 11 (Nov 16)																		
Week 12 (Nov 22)																		
Week 13 (Nov 29)																		

==== Totals per school ====
School	Total
Alabama	7
Kentucky	7
Missouri	7
South Carolina	7
Tennessee	7
Florida	6
LSU	6
Texas	6
Georgia	5
Oklahoma	5
Ole Miss	5
Auburn	3
Mississippi State	2
Arkansas	1
Texas A&M	1
Vanderbilt	1

=== SEC individual awards ===
==== Players of the Year ====
On December 9, 2026, the Southeastern Conference will release their Players of the Year and All-Conference Honors at the end of the season.

Award	Player/coaches	School
Offensive Player of the Year		
Defensive Player of the Year		
Freshman of the Year		
Special Teams of the Year		
Newcomer of the Year		
Jacobs Blocking Trophy		
Scholar Athlete of the Year		
Coach of the Year		

=== All-Americans ===
Currently, the NCAA compiles consensus all-America teams in the sports of Division I-FBS football and Division I men's basketball, using a point system computed from All-America teams named by coaches' associations or media sources. The system consists of three points for a first-team honor, two points for second-team honor, and one point for third-team honor. Honorable mention and fourth team or lower recognitions are not accorded any points. College Football All-American consensus teams are compiled by position, and the player accumulating the most points at each position is named first team consensus all-American. Currently, the NCAA recognizes All-Americans selected by the AP, AFCA, FWAA, TSN, and WCFF to determine Consensus and Unanimous All-Americans. Any player named to the First Team by all five of the NCAA-recognized selectors is deemed a Unanimous All-American.

Position	Player	School	Selector	Unanimous	Consensus
First Team All-Americans

Position	Player	School	Selector	Unanimous	Consensus
Second Team All-Americans

Position	Player	School	Selector	Unanimous	Consensus
Third Team All-Americans

==== List of All-American teams ====
- 2026 AFCA All-America Team
- 2026 Associated Press All-America Team
- 2026 FWAA All-America Team
- Sporting News 2026 College Football All-America Team
- Walter Camp Football Foundation 2026 All-America Team
- 2026 The Athletic All-America Team
- 2026 Athlon Sports College Football's Postseason All-America Team
- 2026 CBS Sports All-America Team
- 2026 College Football News
- 2026 ESPN All-America Team
- 2026 Fox Sports All-America Team
- 2026 PFF College All-America team
- 2026 Phil Steele's Postseason All-America Team
- Sports Illustrated 2026 All-America Team
- USA Today 2026 All-America Team

=== All-SEC teams ===
At the conclusion of the regular season, All-SEC Conference football teams will be named. Any teams showing (_) following their name are indicating the number of All-Big 12 Conference Honors awarded to that university for 1st team and 2nd team respectively.

First Team

Position	Player	Class	Team
First Team offense
QB			
RB			
FB			
WR			
TE			
OL			
First Team defense
DL			
LB			
DB			
First Team Special Teams
PK			
P			
RS			

Second Team

Position	Player	Class	Team
Second Team offense
QB			
RB			
FB			
WR			
TE			
OL			
Second Team defense
DL			
LB			
DB			
Second Team Special Teams
PK			
P			
RS			

Notes:

- RS = Return specialist
- AP/ST = All-purpose/special teams player (not a kicker or returner)
- † Two-time first team selection
- ‡ Three-time first team selection

Honorable mentions

- Alabama:
- Arkansas:
- Auburn:
- Florida:
- Georgia:
- Kentucky:
- LSU:
- Mississippi State:
- Missouri:
- Oklahoma:
- Ole Miss:
- South Carolina:
- Tennessee:
- Texas:
- Texas A&M:
- Vanderbilt:

=== National award winners ===
2026 College Football Award Winners

Award	Player	Class	Position	School

== Home game attendance ==
Team	Stadium	Capacity	Game 1	Game 2	Game 3	Game 4	Game 5	Game 6	Game 7	Total	Average	% of capacity
Alabama	Bryant–Denny Stadium	100,077	**100,077†**	**100,077†**	**100,077†**	**100,077†**	100,077†			500,385	100,077	100%
Arkansas	Donald W. Reynolds Razorback Stadium	76,000	69,178	66,123	72,890†	69,038				277,229	69,307	91.19%
Auburn	Jordan–Hare Stadium	88,043	**88,043†**	**88,043†**	**88,043†**	**88,043†**			—N/a	352,172	88,043	100%
Florida	Ben Hill Griffin Stadium	88,548	**90,295**	**88,863**	**90,683†**	**90,311**			—N/a	360,152	90,038	101.68%
Georgia	Sanford Stadium	93,033	**93,033†**	**93,033†**	**93,033†**	**93,033†**	93,033†			465,165	93,033	100%
Kentucky	Kroger Field	61,000	60,166	**61,820**	**61,127**	**61,897†**	61,843			306,853	61,371	100.61%
LSU	Tiger Stadium	102,321	**102,321†**	**102,321†**	**102,321†**	**102,321†**	102,321†			511,605	102,321	100%
Mississippi State	Davis Wade Stadium	60,311	48,771	**60,417†**	**60,417†**	49,224				218,829	54,707	90.71%
Missouri	Faurot Field	63,609	**63,609†**	**63,609†**	**63,609†**					190,827	63,609	100%
Oklahoma	Gaylord Family Oklahoma Memorial Stadium	80,126	**84,315†**	**83,423**	**83,218**				—N/a	250,956	83,652	104.4%
Ole Miss	Vaught–Hemingway Stadium	64,038	**68,134**	**70,033‡**	**67,510**					205,677	68,559	107.06%
South Carolina	Williams–Brice Stadium	77,559	**77,559**	**78,399**	**78,360**	**79,193†**				313,511	78,378	101.06%
Tennessee	Neyland Stadium	101,915	**101,915†**	**101,915†**	**101,915†**	**101,915†**				407,660	101,915	100%
Texas	Darrell K Royal-Texas Memorial Stadium	100,119	**102,738**	**105,044†**	**103,753**	**103,989**	104,306			519,830	103,966	103.84%
Texas A&M	Kyle Field	102,733	**107,762†**	**107,523**	**105,186**	101,052				421,523	105,381	102.58%
Vanderbilt	FirstBank Stadium	35,000	**35,000†**	**35,000†**	**35,000†**	**35,000†**	35,000†			175,000	35,000	100%

Bold – at or exceeded capacity
† Season high
‡ Record stadium attendance

== NFL draft ==
The NFL draft will be held at National Mall in Washington, DC. The following list includes all SEC players selected in the draft.

=== List of selections ===
Player	Position	School	Draft round	Round pick	Overall pick	Team

=== Total picks by school ===
Team	Round 1	Round 2	Round 3	Round 4	Round 5	Round 6	Round 7	Total
