= 2024 college football recruiting class =

Recruiting of students for US college football

The college football recruiting class of 2024 refers to the recruiting of high school athletes to play college football starting in the fall of 2024. The scope of this article covers: (a) the colleges and universities with recruiting classes ranking among the top 25 in the country as assessed by at least one of the major media outlets, and (b) the individual recruits ranking among the top 25 in the country as assessed by at least one of the major media outlets.

== Top ranked classes ==
School	247	Rivals	On3
Georgia	1	1	1
Alabama	2	2	2
Oregon	3	6	4
Miami (FL)	4	5	5
Ohio State	5	4	3
Texas	6	3	6
LSU	7	11	7
Oklahoma	8	7	9
Notre Dame	9	9	11
Auburn	10	8	8
Clemson	11	10	14
Florida State	12	12	12
Tennessee	13	14	13
Florida	14	15	10
Penn State	15	17	16
Michigan	16	13	15
USC	17	18	18
Nebraska	18	16	19
Texas A&M	19	20	17
Missouri	20	22	21
Ole Miss	21	21	19
South Carolina	22	30	20
Wisconsin	23	19	22
Texas Tech	24	24	23
Kentucky	25	25	25

== Top ranked recruits ==
The following individuals were rated by one of the major media outlets among the top 20 players in the country in the Class of 2024. They are listed in order of their highest ranking by any of the major media outlets. Rankings may change, and the rankings reflected below are current as of October 6, 2024.

Player	Position	School	ESPN	Rivals	247Sports	On3
Jeremiah Smith	Wide receiver	Ohio State	4	1	1	1
Ellis Robinson IV	Cornerback	Georgia	1	3	2	4
DJ Lagway	Quarterback	Florida	8	28	3	2
Dylan Raiola	Quarterback	Nebraska	11	2	7	71
Jaylen Mbakwe	Athlete	Alabama	2	21	12	31
Ryan Coleman-Williams	Wide receiver	Alabama	3	4	8	8
Cam Coleman	Wide receiver	Auburn	5	7	5	3
L.J. McCray	Defensive end	Florida	10	58	4	6
Julian Sayin	Quarterback	Ohio State	9	6	20	5
David Stone	Defensive tackle	Oklahoma	6	5	17	29
Williams Nwaneri	Defensive end	Missouri	21	8	6	14
Jordan Seaton	Offensive tackle	Colorado	19	22	13	22
Justin Williams	Linebacker	Georgia	7	11	10	9
Jordan Ross	Defensive end	Tennessee	24	45	9	7
Micah Hudson	Wide receiver	Texas Tech	22	9	25	20
Colin Simmons	Defensive end	Texas	12	10	28	28
Marquise Lightfoot	Defensive end	Miami (FL)	107	17	34	10
Justin Scott	Defensive tackle	Miami (FL)	30	13	11	11
Dylan Stewart	Defensive end	South Carolina	14	24	19	12
Dominick McKinley	Defensive tackle	LSU	17	12	18	24
Sammy Brown	Linebacker	Clemson	13	34	14	19
TJ Moore	Wide receiver	Clemson	50	43	21	13
KJ Bolden	Safety	Georgia	16	14	15	25
Terry Bussey	Athlete	Texas A&M	18	15	16	15
Kobe Black	Cornerback	Texas	15	32	60	69
Joseph Jonah-Ajonye	Defensive tackle	Georgia	26	16	56	34
Josiah Thompson	Offensive tackle	South Carolina	61	64	37	16
Zavier Mincey	Cornerback	Alabama	46	44	31	17
Eddrick Houston	Defensive end	Ohio State	35	18	33	53
Guerby Lambert	Offensive tackle	Notre Dame	94	37	88	18
Kyngstonn Viliamu-Asa	Linebacker	Notre Dame	75	19	42	83
Chris Cole	Linebacker	Georgia	20	66	23	39
Kamarion Franklin	Defensive end	Ole Miss	96	20	137	197
