= Ellis Robinson =

Ellis Robinson may refer to:

- Ellis Robinson (cricketer) (1911–1998), English cricketer
- Ellis Robinson IV, American football cornerback

== See also ==
- Robinson Ellis (1834–1913), English classical scholar
