= 2025 college football recruiting class =

Recruiting of students for US college football

The college football recruiting class of 2025 refers to high school athletes recruited to play college football in the fall of 2025. The scope of this article covers: (a) the colleges and universities with recruiting classes ranking among the top 25 in the country as assessed by at least one of the major media outlets, and (b) the individual recruits ranking among the top 20 in the country as assessed by at least one of the major media outlets: 247Sports, ESPN, On3 and Rivals.

== Top ranked classes ==
Each of the schools listed below were ranked within the top 25 recruiting classes by at least one major recruiting site. They are listed in order of their highest ranking by any of the major media outlets. Rankings may change, and the rankings reflected below are current as of February 6, 2025.

School	247	Rivals	On3
Texas	1	1	1
Georgia	2	2	2
Alabama	3	4	3
Ohio State	4	3	5
Oregon	5	5	4
Michigan	6	6	6
Auburn	7	9	8
LSU	10	7	9
Texas A&M	9	10	7
Florida	8	8	11
Tennessee	11	12	10
Notre Dame	12	11	12
Miami (FL)	13	13	13
USC	14	15	15
Penn State	15	16	14
Ole Miss	16	14	19
Missouri	20	22	16
Oklahoma	17	18	17
Florida State	19	17	20
South Carolina	18	20	18
Nebraska	22	19	21
Georgia Tech	21	23	24
Wisconsin	27	21	27
Mississippi State	28	34	22
Washington	23	25	25
Clemson	26	32	23
TCU	24	27	26
Kentucky	29	24	28
Maryland	25	27	32

== Top ranked recruits ==
The following individuals were ranked by at least one of the major media outlets among the top 20 players in the country in the class of 2025. They are listed in order of their highest ranking by any of the major media outlets. Rankings may change, and the rankings reflected below are current as of February 6, 2025.

Player	Position	School	ESPN	Rivals	247Sports	On3
Bryce Underwood	Quarterback	Michigan	1	3	1	1
Keelon Russell	Quarterback	Alabama	2	1	2	2
Tavien St. Clair	Quarterback	Ohio State	10	2	4	NR
Elijah Griffin	Defensive tackle	Georgia	3	4	3	3
Dakorien Moore	Wide receiver	Oregon	4	5	9	6
Will Black	Offensive tackle	Notre Dame	NR	20	NR	4
Devin Sanchez	Cornerback	Ohio State	13	7	5	19
Na'eem Offord	Cornerback	Oregon	5	NR	17	17
Lance Jackson	Defensive end	Texas	NR	NR	NR	5
Michael Fasusi	Offensive tackle	Oklahoma	6	8	8	7
David Sanders Jr.	Offensive tackle	Tennessee	7	6	11	9
Jonah Williams	Athlete	Texas	9	16	6	15
Amare Adams	Defensive tackle	Clemson	NR	NR	7	NR
Isaiah Gibson	Defensive end	Georgia	14	9	14	8
Justus Terry	Defensive tackle	Texas	8	11	13	NR
Andrew Babalola	Offensive tackle	Michigan	NR	NR	10	14
DJ Pickett	Athlete	LSU	18	13	NR	10
Julian Lewis	Quarterback	Colorado	12	10	NR	NR
Michael Carroll	Offensive guard	Alabama	NR	15	12	11
Dijon Lee	Cornerback	Alabama	11	12	15	NR
Husan Longstreet	Quarterback	USC	NR	NR	NR	12
Quincy Porter	Wide receiver	Ohio State	NR	NR	NR	13
Harlem Berry	Running back	LSU	NR	14	NR	18
Blake Woodby	Cornerback	Auburn	15	NR	NR	NR
Ty Haywood	Offensive tackle	Michigan	16	NR	NR	NR
Hayden Lowe	Defensive end	Miami (FL)	NR	NR	16	NR
Jackson Lloyd	Offensive tackle	Alabama	NR	NR	NR	16
Javion Hilson	Defensive end	Missouri	NR	17	NR	NR
Solomon Thomas	Offensive tackle	LSU	17	NR	NR	NR
Juan Gaston	Offensive tackle	Georgia	NR	NR	18	NR
Riley Pettijohn	Linebacker	Ohio State	NR	18	NR	NR
Malachi Goodman	Offensive tackle	Penn State	NR	NR	19	NR
Kaliq Lockett	Wide receiver	Texas	NR	19	NR	NR
S.J. Alofaituli	Offensive guard	Miami (FL)	19	NR	NR	NR
Dramodd Odoms	Offensive tackle	Southern Methodist	NR	NR	20	NR
Lamont Rogers	Offensive tackle	Texas A&M	20	NR	NR	NR
Jaron-Keawe Sagapolutele	Quarterback	Cal	NR	NR	NR	20

NR= Not ranked inside top 20
