= Robert Wilson (wide receiver) =

American football player (1974–2020)

No. 83, 16, 80
- Position: Wide receiver

Personal information
- Born: June 23, 1974; Tallahassee, Florida, U.S.
- Died: September 9, 2020 (aged 46); Tallahassee, Florida, U.S.
- Listed height: 5 ft 11 in (1.80 m)
- Listed weight: 176 lb (80 kg)

Career information
- High school: Jefferson County (Monticello, Florida)
- College: Florida A&M (1993–1996)
- NFL draft: 1997: undrafted

Career history
- Seattle Seahawks (1997–1999); New Orleans Saints (2000–2001)

Career NFL statistics
- Receptions: 32
- Receiving yards: 431
- Total touchdowns: 1
- Stats at Pro Football Reference

Robert Wilson (June 23, 1974 – September 9, 2020) was an American professional football wide receiver who played in the National Football League (NFL) for the Seattle Seahawks and New Orleans Saints. He played college football at Florida A&M University.

== Early life and college ==
Robert Wilson was born on June 23, 1974, in Tallahassee, Florida. He attended Jefferson County High School in Monticello, Florida.

Wilson played college football for the Florida A&M Rattlers of Florida A&M University from 1993 to 1996. As a senior in 1996, he set school single-season records in receptions with 78, receiving yards with 1,161, and receiving touchdowns with ten. He recorded college career totals of 218 catches for 3,027 yards and 23 touchdowns. Wilson was inducted into Florida A&M's athletics hall of fame in 2016.

== Professional career ==
Wilson signed with the Seattle Seahawks on April 25, 1997, after going undrafted in the 1997 NFL draft. He was released on August 18 and signed to the team's practice squad the next day. He was promoted to the active roster on December 17, 1997, but did not play in any games that year. Wilson played in all 16 games for the Seahawks during the 1998 season but only had one pass thrown his way. He also returned one kick for 16 yards. He was released on September 6, 1999. Wilson was promoted to the active roster on October 20. He appeared in two games that season, posting two solo tackles, before being released on November 13, 1999.

Wilson signed with the New Orleans Saints on March 6, 2000. He played in 15 games for the Saints in 2000, recording 11 receptions for 154 yards on 19 targets and nine solo tackles. He also appeared in two playoff games that year, catching four passes for 55 yards and one touchdown on seven targets while also posting one assisted tackle. Wilson became a free agent after the 2000 season and re-signed with the Saints on July 24, 2001. He played in 15 games for the second straight year, starting one, in 2001, totaling 21 catches for 277 yards on 38 targets, ten solo tackles, and two assisted tackles. He became a free agent after the 2001 season and re-signed with the Saints. Wilson was released on September 1, 2002.

== Personal life ==
On September 9, 2020, Wilson died in Tallahassee at the age of 46 due to complications resulting from a stroke. As of 2022, his son, Robert Wilson Jr., was a freshman cornerback for the Grambling State Tigers. As of 2023, his other son, Raylen Wilson, was a freshman inside linebacker for the Georgia Bulldogs.
