= DJ Pickett =

American football cornerback

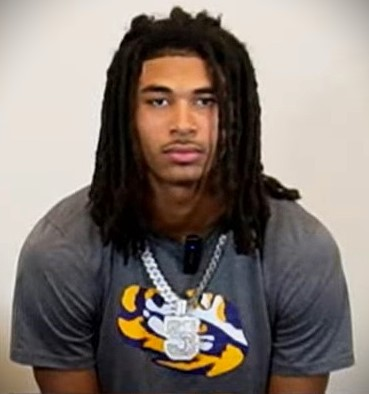
- Pickett in 2025

No. 5 – LSU Tigers
- Position: Cornerback
- Class: Sophomore

Personal information
- Listed height: 6 ft 4 in (1.93 m)
- Listed weight: 196 lb (89 kg)

Career information
- High school: Zephyrhills (Zephyrhills, Florida)
- College: LSU (2025–present)
- Stats at ESPN

DJ Pickett is an American college football cornerback for the LSU Tigers.

== Early life ==
Pickett is from Zephyrhills, Florida. He has several relatives who have played football, and his father, cousin and uncle each played for Zephyrhills High School. His uncle, Ryan Pickett, played in the NFL for 14 years and won a Super Bowl with the Green Bay Packers. Pickett attended Zephyrhills where he was a two-way football player at wide receiver and defensive back. In addition to football, he also participated in track and field, baseball and basketball. He began playing varsity football as a sophomore and recorded 43 receptions for 886 yards and 12 touchdowns that year. He then caught 52 passes for 1,033 yards and 15 touchdowns in 2023 while also totaling 31 tackles and an interception on defense.

As a senior in 2024, Pickett recorded 658 receiving yards and made five interceptions, helping his team finish 8–4 while reaching the second round of the Class 4A playoffs. He broke the Pasco County career receiving record, finishing his three-year stint at Zephyrhills having totaled 130 receptions for 2,577 yards and 35 touchdowns, while on defense he made 94 tackles and 10 interceptions. He was named a Sports Illustrated high school All-American following his senior season, being the first Zephyrhills player to receive the honor since his uncle in 1997.

Pickett was a five-star recruit and one of the top players in the 2025 college football recruiting class. He was ranked the top cornerback in the nation by On3.com and Rivals.com and a top-10 prospect nationally by On3. He committed to play college football for the LSU Tigers.

== College career ==
Pickett came to LSU as an early enrollee in December 2024.
