= Jake Kreul =

American football player

No. 88 – Oklahoma Sooners
- Position: Defensive lineman
- Class: Freshman

Personal information
- Listed height: 6 ft 3 in (1.91 m)
- Listed weight: 240 lb (109 kg)

Career information
- High school: IMG Academy (Bradenton, Florida)
- College: Oklahoma (2026–present)
- Stats at ESPN

Jake Kreul is an American football defensive end for the Oklahoma Sooners.

== Early life ==
Kreul attended Bishop Moore Catholic High School in Orlando, Florida, for two years before transferring to IMG Academy in Bradenton, Florida, ahead of his junior season. As a sophomore, he posted 76 tackles with 34 for a loss and 17 sacks. Kreul entered his junior season at IMG as a starter on their defensive line. He finished his junior season with 39 tackles and six sacks. Kreul was rated as a five-star recruit by ESPN and committed to play college football for the Oklahoma Sooners over offers from Colorado, Ole Miss, Ohio State, and Texas.

== College career ==
In week 7 of the 2026 season, Kreul notched two and a half sacks in a loss to Kentucky.
