= Myles Graham =

American football player (born 2006)

No. 5 – Florida Gators
- Position: Linebacker
- Class: Junior

Personal information
- Born: February 23, 2006 (age 20)
- Listed height: 6 ft 1 in (1.85 m)
- Listed weight: 225 lb (102 kg)

Career information
- High school: Buchholz (Gainesville, Florida)
- College: Florida (2024–present)
- Stats at ESPN

Myles Graham (born February 23, 2006) is an American college football linebacker for the Florida Gators.

== Early life ==
Graham is from Gainesville, Florida. The son of former NFL player Earnest Graham, Graham grew up playing football as a linebacker. He first attended the Evangelical Christian School in Florida, where he was coached by his father and recorded 130 tackles and 595 rushing yards as a sophomore. He then transferred to Woodward Academy in Georgia for his junior year. At Woodward, Graham ran for 465 yards and six touchdowns while posting 63 tackles and five sacks.

Graham played his senior season at Buchholz High School in Gainesville, Florida, posting 59 tackles and six tackles-for-loss (TFLs). He was named The Gainesville Sun Big School Defensive Player of the Year for his performance. After the season, he participated in the Under Armour All-America Game. He was ranked by Rivals.com as a five-star recruit, the 26th-best player nationally and the best linebacker prospect in the class of 2024. He committed to play college football for the Florida Gators.

== College career ==
As a true freshman at Florida in 2024, Graham played in all 13 games and tallied 30 tackles, 2.5 TFLs, a sack, an interception and a forced fumble, earning Freshman All-Southeastern Conference (SEC) honors. He became a starter as a sophomore in 2025.
