= Kelley Jones (American football) =

American football player (born 2004)

No. 1 – Mississippi State Bulldogs
- Position: Cornerback
- Class: Redshirt Junior

Personal information
- Born: March 11, 2004 (age 22)
- Listed height: 6 ft 4 in (1.93 m)
- Listed weight: 195 lb (88 kg)

Career information
- High school: Clarksdale (Clarksdale, Mississippi)
- College: Mississippi State (2023–present)

Awards and highlights
- Third-team All-SEC (2025)
- Stats at ESPN

Kelley Maurice Jones (born March 11, 2004) is an American college football cornerback for the Mississippi State Bulldogs.

== Early life ==
Jones attended Clarksdale High School in Clarksdale, Mississippi, where he played both defensive back and quarterback. As a senior, he passed for 558 yards with 10 touchdowns and rushed for 1,424 yards with 19 touchdowns. He committed to Mississippi State University to play college football.

== College career ==
Jones played in three games and redshirted his first year at Mississippi State in 2023. As a redshirt freshman in 2024, he started four of 11 games and had 29 tackles. Jones entered his redshirt sophomore year in 2025 as a starter.
