= Zabien Brown =

American football player

No. 2 – Alabama Crimson Tide
- Position: Cornerback
- Class: Junior

Personal information
- Born: November 7, 2004 (age 22)
- Listed height: 6 ft 0 in (1.83 m)
- Listed weight: 194 lb (88 kg)

Career information
- High school: Mater Dei High School
- College: Alabama (2024–present)
- Stats at ESPN

Zabien Brown (born November 7, 2004) is an American college football cornerback for the Alabama Crimson Tide.

== Early life ==
Brown attended Mater Dei High School in Santa Ana, California. As a junior, he notched 32 tackles, three interceptions, and a forced fumble. Coming out of high school, Brown was rated as a four-star recruit and the seventh-ranked cornerback in the class of 2024. He committed to play college football for the Alabama Crimson Tide over offers from California, Georgia, Ohio State, and USC.

== College career ==
Heading his 2024 freshman season, Brown competed for one of the Alabama starting defensive back positions. In his first collegiate game, he made the start for the Crimson Tide where he allowed no receptions in a win over Western Kentucky. In week 5, Brown had the game-winning interception, as he helped the Crimson Tide upset their rivals Georgia 41–34. In 2025, Brown returned an interception 99 yards for a touchdown against the Tennessee Volunteers at the end of the first half, ultimately helping Alabama seal a 37-20 victory. Brown returned another interception for a pivotal pick six touchdown against Oklahoma in the first round of the College Football Playoff.
