= Champ Anthony =

American football player (born 2004)

No. 1 – Auburn Tigers
- Position: Cornerback
- Class: Senior

Personal information
- Born: June 12, 2004 (age 22)
- Listed height: 5 ft 11 in (1.80 m)
- Listed weight: 195 lb (88 kg)

Career information
- High school: Trinity Leadership High (Cedar Hill, Texas)
- College: Tyler Junior College (2022); Auburn (2023–present)
- Stats at ESPN

Chancellor "Champ" Anthony (born June 12, 2004) is an American football cornerback who plays for the Auburn Tigers. He previously played for Tyler Junior College.

== College career ==
=== Tyler Junior College ===
Anthony played for Tyler Junior College in four games during the 2022 season. He intercepted the ball one time, against Kilgore College.

=== Auburn ===
After transferring to Auburn, Anthony played in four games during the 2023 season. He was considered a leading defensive back in 2024, but Anthony suffered a broken leg against Arkansas. He was carried off the field in a stretcher after the injury.

After receiving surgery, Anthony resumed training in the spring of 2025. Anthony returned for practice in fall training. He was described as a potential breakout star for the season by A.J. Hester of Sports Illustrated. In his first game back against the Baylor Bears, he suffered a broken thumb, which required surgery. He returned, but suffered a leg injury soon after, which caused him to miss the rest of the season.
