= Raylen Wilson =

American football player (born 2005)

No. 5 – Georgia Bulldogs
- Position: Linebacker
- Class: Senior

Personal information
- Born: July 7, 2005 (age 21)
- Listed height: 6 ft 1 in (1.85 m)
- Listed weight: 235 lb (107 kg)

Career information
- High school: Lincoln (Tallahassee, Florida)
- College: Georgia (2023–present)

Awards and highlights
- First-team All-SEC Freshman (2023)
- Stats at ESPN

Raylen Akin Wilson (born July 7, 2005) is an American college football linebacker for the Georgia Bulldogs of the Southeastern Conference (SEC).

== Early life ==
Wilson attended Lincoln High School in Tallahassee, Florida. As a senior, he had 117 tackles and as a senior and junior, he was the Tallahassee Democrat All-Big Bend Defensive Player of the Year. A five-star recruit, Wilson was selected to play in the 2023 Under Armour All-America Game. He originally committed to the University of Michigan to play college football but switched to the University of Georgia.

== College career ==
As a true freshman at Georgia in 2023, Wilson played in 12 games with one start and had 15 tackles and 0.5 sacks. He returned to Georgia for his sophomore year in 2024.

== Personal life ==
Wilson is the son of the late NFL wide receiver, Robert Wilson.
