= Xavier Atkins =

American football player (born 2005)

Profile
- Position: Linebacker
- Class: Junior

Personal information
- Born: September 12, 2005 (age 21)
- Listed height: 6 ft 0 in (1.83 m)
- Listed weight: 210 lb (95 kg)

Career information
- High school: Jonesboro-Hodge (Jonesboro, Louisiana); Summer Creek (Houston, Texas)
- College: LSU (2024); Auburn (2025–2026)

Awards and highlights
- First-team All-SEC (2025)
- Stats at ESPN

Xavier Atkins (born September 12, 2005) is an American college football linebacker. He previously played for the LSU Tigers and Auburn Tigers.

== Early life ==
Atkins attended Jonesboro-Hodge High School in Jonesboro, Louisiana for three years before transferring to Summer Creek High School in Harris County, Texas for his senior year. As a senior, he had 102 tackles, two sacks and two interceptions. He originally committed to play college football at the University of Missouri before flipping to Louisiana State University (LSU).

== College career ==
As a freshman at LSU in 2024, Atkins played in seven games and had three tackles. After the season, he transferred to Auburn University. He was a starter his first year at Auburn in 2025. Atkins was dismissed from the team after 5 games into the 2026 season.
