= Elijah Griffin =

American football player (born 2006)

No. 90 – Georgia Bulldogs
- Position: Defensive tackle
- Class: Sophomore

Personal information
- Born: October 12, 2006 (age 20)
- Listed height: 6 ft 4 in (1.93 m)
- Listed weight: 310 lb (141 kg)

Career information
- High school: Savannah Christian Prep (Savannah, Georgia)
- College: Georgia (2025–present)
- Stats at ESPN

Elijah Griffin (born October 12, 2006) is an American college football defensive tackle for the Georgia Bulldogs of the Southeastern Conference (SEC).

== Early life ==
Griffin attended Savannah Christian Preparatory School in Savannah, Georgia. When Griffin was in eighth grade, he received an offer from Georgia, without playing a down of high school football. As a sophomore, he recorded 14.5 sacks, 82 tackles, and 30 tackles-for-losses. He followed that up by tallying 17.5 sacks with 97 tackles, 31 tackles-for-losses, and an interception as a junior. Griffin finished his high school career totaling more than 300 total tackles, 96 tackles-for-loss, and 44 sacks. Griffin was rated as a consensus five-star recruit and was the top rated defensive player in the 2025 class. Griffin committed to play college football at the University of Georgia over offers from Miami and USC. He officially signed with Georgia in December 2024.

=== Recruiting ===
College recruiting (2025)
Name	Hometown	School	Height	Weight	Commit date
Elijah Griffin; DL	Savannah, Georgia	Savannah Christian Preparatory School	6 ft 5 in (1.96 m)	300 lb (140 kg)	Oct 18, 2024
Elijah Griffin; DL	Recruit ratings: Rivals: 247Sports: ESPN: (91)				
