= Lance Heard =

American football player (born 2004)

No. 53 – Kentucky Wildcats
- Position: Offensive tackle
- Class: Senior

Personal information
- Born: October 13, 2004 (age 22); Monroe, Louisiana, U.S.
- Listed height: 6 ft 6 in (1.98 m)
- Listed weight: 325 lb (147 kg)

Career information
- High school: Neville (Monroe, Louisiana)
- College: LSU (2023); Tennessee (2024–2025); Kentucky (2026–present)

Awards and highlights
- Third-team All-SEC (2025); SEC All-Freshman Team (2023)
- Stats at ESPN

Zalance "Lance" Heard (born October 13, 2004) is an American college football offensive tackle for the Kentucky Wildcats. He previously played for the LSU Tigers and the Tennessee Volunteers.

== Early life ==
Heard was born on October 13, 2004, in Monroe, Louisiana. Heard attended Bastrop High School for two years before transferring to Neville High School. As a junior, he switched to the offensive side of the ball to play right tackle and earned all-district and all-state honors. After his senior season, Heard was invited to play in the U.S. Army Bowl where he caught a touchdown.

=== Recruiting ===
Coming out of high school, Heard was rated as a five-star recruit by On3.com and a four-star recruit by 247Sports and Rivals.com. He committed to play college football for the LSU Tigers over offers from schools such as Nebraska, Florida, Florida State, and Houston.

== College career ==
=== LSU ===
As a freshman in 2023, Heard played all 12 games, making one start for the Tigers and earning SEC all-freshman honors. After the season, he entered his name into the NCAA transfer portal.

=== Tennessee ===
Heard transferred to play for the Tennessee Volunteers. He appeared in 11 games in the 2024 season. Heard entered the transfer portal after the 2025 season.

== Personal life ==
Heard grew up in the village of Bonita, Louisiana, and moved to Monroe, Louisiana at age 14.
