= Will Echoles =

American football player (born 2006)

No. 52 – Ole Miss Rebels
- Position: Defensive tackle
- Class: Junior

Personal information
- Born: August 7, 2006 (age 20)
- Listed height: 6 ft 3 in (1.91 m)
- Listed weight: 315 lb (143 kg)

Career information
- High school: Houston (Houston, Mississippi)
- College: Ole Miss (2024–present)

Awards and highlights
- First-team All-SEC (2025)
- Stats at ESPN

William Jamierous Echoles (born August 7, 2006) is an American college football defensive tackle for the Ole Miss Rebels.

== Early life ==
Echoles attended Houston High School in Houston, Mississippi, where he played both defensive and offensive line. As a senior, he was the 4A Mississippi Mr. Football and 4A MHSAA Defensive Player of the Year after recording 59 tackles and seven sacks. Echoles was selected to play in the 2024 All-American Bowl. He committed to the University of Mississippi (Ole Miss) to play college football.

== College career ==
As a true freshman at Ole Miss in 2024, Echoles appeared in eight games and had nine tackles and 0.5 sacks. He returned to Ole Miss as a starter his sophomore year in 2025.
