= Michael Fasusi =

Nigerian American football tackle

No. 56 – Oklahoma Sooners
- Position: Offensive tackle
- Class: Sophomore

Personal information
- Born: Nigeria
- Listed height: 6 ft 5 in (1.96 m)
- Listed weight: 320 lb (145 kg)

Career information
- High school: Lewisville (Lewisville, Texas, U.S.)
- College: Oklahoma (2025–present)
- Stats at ESPN

Michael Fasusi is a Nigerian American football offensive tackle for the Oklahoma Sooners.

== Early life ==
Fasusi is from Omuo-Ekiti in Nigeria. He grew up playing soccer. In 2019, his family moved from Ondo State to Lewisville, Texas, in the U.S., with his parents searching for better educational opportunities for their children. In eighth grade in the U.S., he was asked about playing American football and tried out the sport.

Fasusi attended Lewisville High School and played football as an offensive lineman and defensive end in ninth grade, but he said that initially, "I didn't know what I was doing," and said that he was repeatedly called for penalties. After considering quitting in favor of basketball, he stayed under a new coach who put him on the varsity and developed him into a top offensive tackle. As a sophomore for Lewisville, Fasusi helped his team reach the Class 6A Division I Region I finals and was selected the district's Newcomer of the Year. He was then named honorable mention all-state as a junior in 2023. Following his senior season in 2024, he was invited to the Under Armour All-America Game and to the Polynesian Bowl.

A five-star recruit and one of the top-ranked prospects in the 2025 recruiting class, Fasusi committed to play college football for the Oklahoma Sooners.

== College career ==
Fasusi joined Oklahoma as an early enrollee for the 2025 season.
