= Quincy Rhodes Jr. =

American football player (born 2004)

No. 97 – Arkansas Razorbacks
- Position: Defensive end
- Class: Senior

Personal information
- Born: December 1, 2004 (age 21)
- Listed height: 6 ft 6 in (1.98 m)
- Listed weight: 277 lb (126 kg)

Career information
- High school: North Little Rock (North Little Rock, Arkansas)
- College: Arkansas (2023–present)

Awards and highlights
- Second-team All-SEC (2025)
- Stats at ESPN

Quincy Rhodes Jr. (born December 1, 2004) is an American college football defensive end for the Arkansas Razorbacks.

== Early life ==
Rhodes Jr. attended North Little Rock High School in North Little Rock, Arkansas. As a senior he had 84 tackles and 11.5 sacks. He was selected to play in the 2022 All-American Bowl. Rhodes Jr. committed to the University of Arkansas to play college football.

== College career ==
Rhodes Jr. spent his first two years at Arkansas as a backup, appearing in 21 games with one start and recording 16 tackles and one sack. He became a full-time starter for the first time his junior year in 2025.
