= Wendell Moe =

American football player

Wendell Moe Jr.
No. 75 – Tennessee Volunteers
- Position: Offensive guard
- Class: Redshirt Senior

Personal information
- Listed height: 6 ft 2 in (1.88 m)
- Listed weight: 330 lb (150 kg)

Career information
- High school: Long Beach Polytechnic (Long Beach, California)
- College: Arizona (2022–2024); Tennessee (2025–present)

Awards and highlights
- First-team All-SEC (2025)
- Stats at ESPN

Wendell Moe Jr. is an American football offensive lineman for the Tennessee Volunteers. He previously played for the Arizona Wildcats.

== Early life ==
Moe Jr. attended Long Beach Polytechnic High School in Long Beach, California. He originally committed to play college football for the Morgan State Bears, though he later flipped his commitment to play for the Arizona Wildcats.

== College career ==
As a freshman at Arizona in 2022, Moe Jr. started three games and took a redshirt. In 2023, he started in all 13 games at left guard. In 2024, Moe Jr. made 11 starts. After the season, he entered his name into the NCAA transfer portal.

Moe Jr. transferred to play for the Tennessee Volunteers. After starting in 11 regular season games for the Volunteers in 2025, he was named first-team all-SEC.

On September 30, 2026, it was announced that Moe Jr. would miss the remainder of the 2026 season following a lower body injury sustained against Texas.
