= David Sanders Jr. =

American football player

No. 70 – Tennessee Volunteers
- Position: Offensive tackle
- Class: Sophomore

Personal information
- Listed height: 6 ft 6 in (1.98 m)
- Listed weight: 305 lb (138 kg)

Career information
- High school: Providence Day School (Charlotte, North Carolina)
- College: Tennessee (2025–present)

David Sanders Jr. is an American college football offensive tackle for the Tennessee Volunteers.

== Early life ==
Sanders grew up in Concord, North Carolina. His father, David Sr., was a college basketball player. Sanders started playing football at age seven and continued while attending Providence Day School in Charlotte, where he became a top offensive tackle and also played on defense. At Providence Day, he also participated in basketball and track and field. As a sophomore, he ranked as the top college recruit nationally for the class of 2025. That year, he was selected to MaxPreps's Sophomore All-America team, and Sanders then was named second-team All-American as a junior in 2023, also being named the Gatorade North Carolina Player of the Year.

Sanders was named a finalist for the North Carolina Mr. Football award as a senior and did not allow a sack, helping Providence Day win its third-straight state championship. A five-star prospect, the top offensive tackle recruit, and a top-10 ranked player nationally in the 2025 recruiting class, he committed to play college football for the Tennessee Volunteers.

== College career ==
Sanders enrolled at Tennessee in 2025 and was shifted from left tackle, his position in high school, to right tackle as a freshman.
