= Kip Lewis =

American football player (born 2004)

No. 10 – Oklahoma Sooners
- Position: Linebacker
- Class: Redshirt Senior

Personal information
- Born: February 20, 2004 (age 22)
- Listed height: 6 ft 1 in (1.85 m)
- Listed weight: 226 lb (103 kg)

Career information
- High school: Carthage (Carthage, Texas)
- College: Oklahoma (2022–present)
- Stats at ESPN

Kip Lewis (born February 20, 2004) is an American college football linebacker for the Oklahoma Sooners.

== Early life ==
Lewis attended Carthage High School in Carthage, Texas. He was rated as a four-star recruit and committed to play college football for the Oklahoma Sooners over offers from schools such as Oklahoma State, Texas, and Texas A&M.

== College career ==
During Lewis's first collegiate season in 2022, he took a redshirt, where he notched two tackles with half a tackle being for a loss. In week 9 of the 2023 season, he tallied five tackles and a fumble recovery, but the Sooners were upset by Kansas. Lewis appeared in all 13 games for the Sooners in 2023, totaling 66 tackles with four being for a loss, a sack, and a fumble recovery. In week five of the 2024 season, he returned an interception 63 yards for a touchdown to help beat Auburn 27–21. For his performance, Lewis was named the Southeastern Conference (SEC) defensive player of the week. In week 13, Lewis picked off quarterback Jalen Milroe, which he returned 49 yards for a touchdown, as he helped lead Oklahoma to a 24-3 upset win over #7 Alabama.
