= Willie Rodriguez (American football) =

American football player

No. 81 – Kentucky Wildcats
- Position: Tight end
- Class: Junior

Personal information
- Born: Cincinnati, Ohio, U.S.
- Listed height: 6 ft 4 in (1.93 m)
- Listed weight: 249 lb (113 kg)

Career information
- High school: Covington Catholic (Park Hills, Kentucky)
- College: Kentucky (2024–present)
- Stats at ESPN

Willie Rodriguez is an American football tight end for the Kentucky Wildcats.

== Early life ==
Rodriguez attended Covington Catholic High School in Park Hills, Kentucky. As a junior, he totaled 14 catches for 295 yards and five touchdowns to go with ten tackles and two sacks. Rodriguez committed to play college football for the Kentucky Wildcats over Auburn and Tennessee.

== College career ==
As a freshman in 2024, Rodriguez totaled five receptions for 94 yards. In week 3 of the 2025 season, he hauled in his first career touchdown reception in a victory against Eastern Michigan. Rodriguez finished the 2025 season with 23 receptions for 310 yards and a touchdown.
