= Ty Redmond =

American football player

No. 4 – Tennessee Volunteers
- Position: Cornerback
- Class: Sophomore

Personal information
- Listed height: 6 ft 2 in (1.88 m)
- Listed weight: 195 lb (88 kg)

Career information
- High school: Milton (Milton, Georgia)
- College: Tennessee (2025–present)

Awards and highlights
- Third-team All-SEC (2025)
- Stats at ESPN

Tyler Redmond is an American college football cornerback for the Tennessee Volunteers.

== Early life ==
Redmond is from Alpharetta, Georgia. He first attended St. Francis School in Alpharetta, where he played football as a cornerback, posting 41 tackles, 14 pass breakups and three interceptions as a sophomore before transferring to Milton High School. He then helped Milton to the Class 7A state championship in 2023 and the Class 5A state championship in 2024. He posted 34 tackles, five tackles-for-loss (TFLs) and two interceptions in his junior year at Milton, then tallied 41 tackles, three TFLs, eight pass breakups and two interceptions in his senior year. Redmond was ranked by 247Sports as the 50th-best cornerback prospect in the recruiting class of 2025. A three-star recruit, he committed to play college football for the Tennessee Volunteers.

== College career ==
Redmond joined Tennessee in January 2025 as an early enrollee, impressing during training camp. He made his debut against Syracuse, coming in for an injured Rickey Gibson III, and tallied four tackles and two pass breakups. He was a backup to begin the season before quickly becoming a starter. Through 10 games, he was the leader among freshmen in the Southeastern Conference (SEC) with eight pass breakups, two interceptions and 10 passes defended. Redmond was named the SEC Freshman of the Week after a game against New Mexico State, when he posted five tackles, a pass breakup and an interception. He was named a semifinalist for the Shaun Alexander Freshman of the Year award.
