= Drew Bobo =

American football player (born 2004)

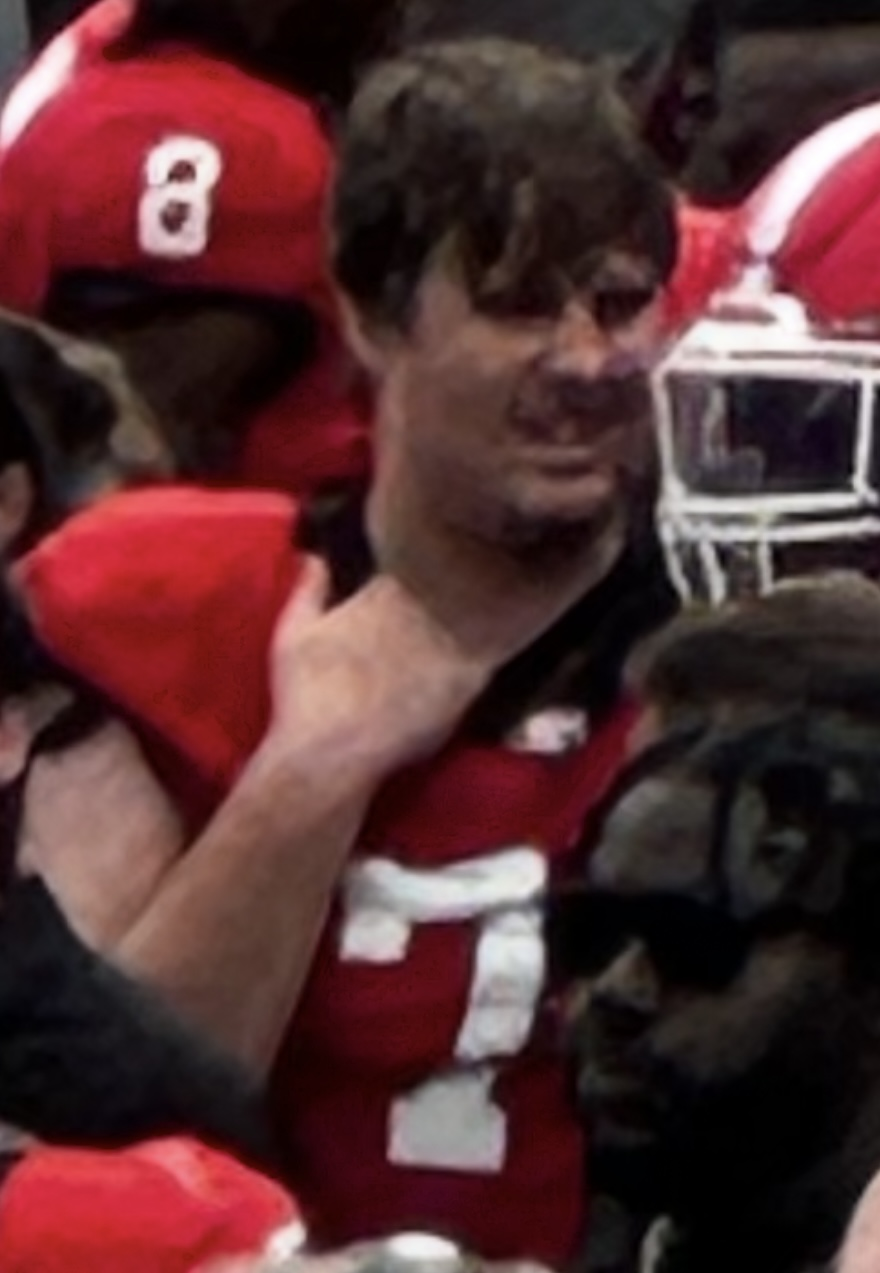
- Bobo in 2025

No. 74 – Georgia Bulldogs
- Position: Center
- Class: Fifth year

Personal information
- Born: March 3, 2004 (age 22); Athens, Georgia, U.S.
- Listed height: 6 ft 5 in (1.96 m)
- Listed weight: 305 lb (138 kg)

Career information
- High school: Auburn (Auburn, Alabama)
- College: Georgia (2022–present)

Awards and highlights
- CFP National Champion (2022); Second-team All-SEC (2025)
- Stats at ESPN

Andrew Michael Bobo (born March 3, 2004) is an American college football center for the Georgia Bulldogs of the Southeastern Conference (SEC).

== Early life ==
Bobo was born in Athens, Georgia and grew up there until fifth grade when his father got a head coaching job at Colorado State. He attended high school in Colorado during his freshman and sophomore seasons, before transferring to Hammond School located in Columbia, South Carolina for his junior, before ending his senior season at Auburn High School located in Auburn, Alabama. Coming out of high school, he was rated as a three star recruit, the 26th overall player in the State of Alabama, the 54th overall offensive tackle, and the 629th overall prospect in the class of 2022, where he held offers from schools such as Auburn, Kentucky, Georgia, Georgia Tech, and Virginia. Initially, Bobo committed to play college football for the Auburn Tigers. However, he flipped his commitment and signed to play for the Georgia Bulldogs.

== College career ==
During his first collegiate season in 2022, he used the season to redshirt. In the 2023 season, Bobo appeared in six games in a reserve role. In week six of the 2024 season, he made his first career start in a win over Auburn, after starter Jared Wilson was injured. Bobo finished the 2024 season, appearing in 12 games, while making two starts. Heading into the 2025 season, he is projected to be the Bulldogs starting center.

== Personal life ==
Bobo is the son of Georgia offensive coordinator Mike Bobo.
