= Princewill Umanmielen =

American football player (born 2005)

No. 1 – LSU Tigers
- Position: Defensive end
- Class: Senior

Personal information
- Born: February 13, 2005 (age 21)
- Listed height: 6 ft 4 in (1.93 m)
- Listed weight: 244 lb (111 kg)

Career information
- High school: Manor (Manor, Texas)
- College: Nebraska (2023–2024); Ole Miss (2025); LSU (2026–present)

Awards and highlights
- Third-team All-SEC (2025)
- Stats at ESPN

Princewill Umanmielen (born February 13, 2005) is an American college football linebacker for the LSU Tigers. He previously played for the Nebraska Cornhuskers and Ole Miss Rebels.

== Early life ==
Umanmielen attended Manor High School in Manor, Texas. In his final two seasons, he totaled 47 tackles for loss and 21 sacks. A four-star recruit, Umanmielen committed to play college football at the University of Nebraska–Lincoln over offers from Arkansas, Florida, and Washington.

== College career ==
=== Nebraska ===
As a freshman, Umanmielen recorded 22 tackles, 4.5 tackles-for-loss, and a sack. As a result, he was named a second-team freshman All-American. The following season, he tallied 13 tackles and 2.5 tackles-for-loss, before entering the transfer portal.

=== Ole Miss ===
On December 14, 2024, Umanmielen, a top-ranked transfer, announced his decision to transfer to the University of Mississippi to play for the Ole Miss Rebels.

== Personal life ==
Umanmielen's older brother, Princely, is an outside linebacker for the Carolina Panthers.

He is of Nigerian descent.
