= Dylan Stewart =

American football player (born 2005)

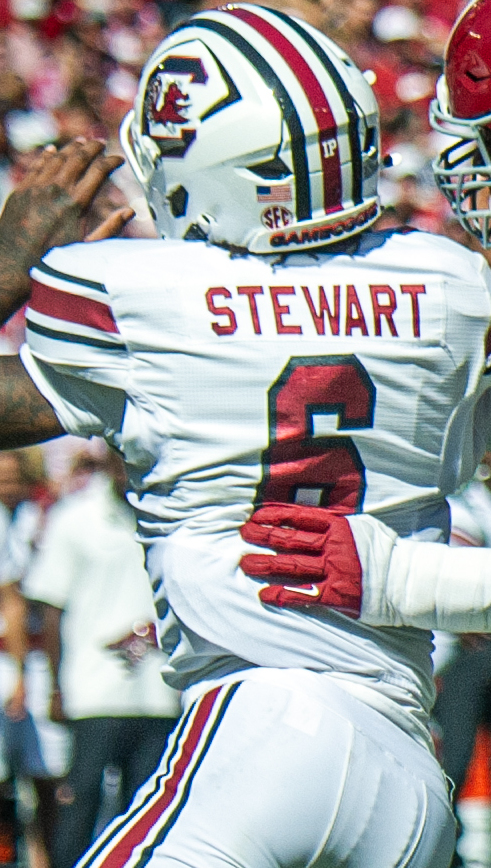
- Stewart with the South Carolina Gamecocks in 2024

No. 6 – South Carolina Gamecocks
- Position: Defensive end
- Class: Junior

Personal information
- Born: September 14, 2005 (age 21)
- Listed height: 6 ft 5 in (1.96 m)
- Listed weight: 250 lb (113 kg)

Career information
- High school: Friendship Collegiate Academy (Washington, D.C.)
- College: South Carolina (2024–2026)

Awards and highlights
- Second-team All-SEC (2025); SEC All-Freshman Team (2024)
- Stats at ESPN

Dylan DaSean Stewart (born September 14, 2005) is an American college football defensive end for the South Carolina Gamecocks.

== Early life ==
Stewart attended Friendship Collegiate Academy in Washington, D.C. As a junior in 2022, he had 16 sacks. Stewart was selected to play in the 2024 Under Armour All-America Game. A five-star recruit and the nation's top ranked edge prospect, he committed to the University of South Carolina to play college football.

== College career ==
In his first collegiate game his freshman year at South Carolina in 2024, he had four tackles, 1.5 sacks and two forced fumbles. At the conclusion of his freshman season, Stewart was named a member of the FWAA Freshman All-American team.

During his Junior year, In the first quarter against Alabama, after a change of possession, he failed to run to the sideline and even ignored his coach telling him to leave the field. Then in the 4th quarter, after a touchdown, during the light show, he proceeded to punch an Alabama player, receiving an unsportsmanlike penalty. On September 27, 2026, after the game, coach Beamer suspended him indefinitely for not carrying himself professionally.

Shortly after his suspension head coach Shane Beamer allowed him to return to the practice field on October 6, 2026, but his status for the following game was still undecides. He ended up making a return after multiple meetings with Coach Beamer and Beamer believes Stewart "Understands the standard at USC" and has learned from the incident and will be better from it. Coach Beamer also stated that everyone on the team is help to the same standard and holding one of the most talented players to that same standard is a "strong statement" to the roster. Stewart returned for the game against the Florida Gators on October 10, 2026, where he made a impact on the game with 5 tackles with 1 tackle for loss and 2 pass deflections.
