= Ellis Robinson IV =

American football player

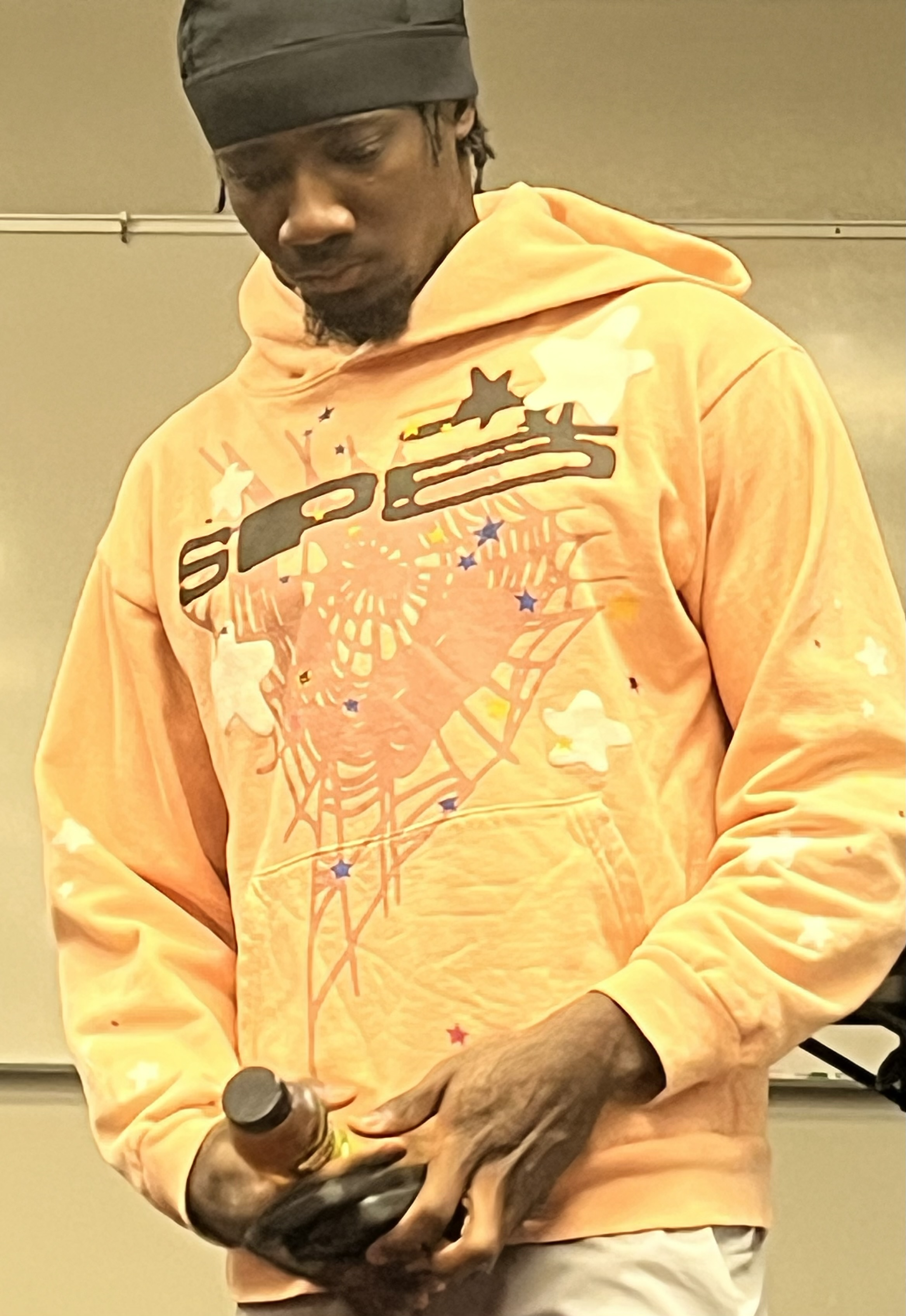
- Robinson in 2025

No. 1 – Georgia Bulldogs
- Position: Cornerback
- Class: Junior

Personal information
- Listed height: 6 ft 0 in (1.83 m)
- Listed weight: 180 lb (82 kg)

Career information
- High school: IMG Academy (Bradenton, Florida)
- College: Georgia (2024–present)

Awards and highlights
- Second-team All-SEC (2025)
- Stats at ESPN

Ellis Robinson IV is an American college football cornerback for the Georgia Bulldogs of the Southeastern Conference (SEC). He was one of the top players in the 2024 class.

== Early life ==
Robinson IV attended IMG Academy in Bradenton, Florida. As a sophomore attending Iona Prep, Robinson IV recorded 28 tackles and eight interceptions, before transferring to IMG Academy. Following his junior season, he was ranked as the number one collegiate prospect in the country by ESPN. A five-star recruit, Robinson IV committed to play college football at the University of Georgia over offers from Alabama, Colorado, LSU, and Miami.

College recruiting (2024)
Name	Hometown	School	Height	Weight	Commit date
Ellis Robinson IV; CB	New Haven, Connecticut	IMG Academy	6 ft 1 in (1.85 m)	180 lb (82 kg)	Feb 1, 2023
Ellis Robinson IV; CB	Recruit ratings: Rivals: 247Sports: ESPN: (91)				
