= David Stone (American football) =

American football player (born 2005)

No. 0 – Oklahoma Sooners
- Position: Defensive tackle
- Class: Junior

Personal information
- Born: November 20, 2005 (age 20); Del City, Oklahoma, U.S.
- Listed height: 6 ft 3 in (1.91 m)
- Listed weight: 315 lb (143 kg)

Career information
- High school: IMG Academy (Bradenton, Florida)
- College: Oklahoma (2024–present)

Awards and highlights
- Polynesian Bowl Defensive MVP (2024)
- Stats at ESPN

David Stone (born November 20, 2005) is an American college football defensive tackle for the Oklahoma Sooners.

== Early life ==
Stone was born in Del City, Oklahoma and attended Del City High School for two years. As a freshman, he recorded 19 tackles and a sack playing in only six games behind an experienced defensive line for Del City. Before his sophomore year, Stone attended the Rivals Underclassmen Challenge in Atlanta, Georgia, where he was named Defensive Line MVP. As a sophomore, he recorded 47 tackles and nine sacks and was named to The Oklahoman's All-City First Team in 2021. In 2022, Stone transferred to IMG Academy and recorded 50 tackles, five sacks, and nine quarterback hurries as a junior and was later named to the MaxPreps Junior All-American. Becoming a key defensive unit, he helped the team allow only 3.0 points per game and 2.1 yards per rush, while forcing 30 turnovers. As a senior, he led the team to a 10–0 record and was named as a MaxPreps First-Team All-American.

=== Recruiting ===
Stone became a consensus five-star prospect and was regarded as the best defensive tackle prospect. Rated as the No. 4 prospect by ESPN, No. 7 by Rivals, and No. 19 by 247Sports and On3, he committed to Oklahoma over offers from Florida, Miami (FL), Michigan State, Oregon, and Texas A&M.

College recruiting
Name	Hometown	School	Height	Weight	Commit date
David Stone; DL	Del City, OK	IMG Academy	6 ft 4 in (1.93 m)	280 lb (130 kg)	Aug 26, 2023
David Stone; DL	Recruit ratings: Rivals: 247Sports: ESPN: (91)				
