= 2026 Oklahoma Sooners football team =

American college football season

2026 Oklahoma Sooners football
- Conference: Southeastern Conference

Ranking
- Coaches: No. 22
- AP: No. 19
- CFP: No. 22
- Record: 7–4 (5–3 SEC)
- Head coach: Brent Venables (5th season)
- Offensive coordinator: Ben Arbuckle (2nd season; first 8 games); Jason Witten (interim; remainder of season)
- Offensive scheme: Spread / air raid
- Defensive coordinator: Todd Bates (5th season)
- Base defense: Multiple 4–2–5
- Home stadium: Gaylord Family Oklahoma Memorial Stadium

Uniform

2026 Southeastern Conference football standings
| | Conf. | | | Overall |
| Team | W | | L | W | | L |
|---|---|---|---|---|---|---|
| No. 1 Georgia y | 8 | – | 1 | 10 | – | 1 |
| No. 5 Texas | 6 | – | 2 | 9 | – | 2 |
| No. 9 Tennessee | 6 | – | 2 | 9 | – | 2 |
| No. 3 Alabama | 6 | – | 2 | 9 | – | 2 |
| No. 22 Oklahoma | 5 | – | 3 | 7 | – | 4 |
| No. 24 Florida | 5 | – | 4 | 7 | – | 4 |
| No. 16 Kentucky | 5 | – | 4 | 7 | – | 4 |
| No. 25 Ole Miss | 4 | – | 4 | 7 | – | 4 |
| Auburn | 4 | – | 4 | 7 | – | 4 |
| Missouri | 4 | – | 4 | 7 | – | 4 |
| No. 21 South Carolina | 4 | – | 5 | 6 | – | 5 |
| LSU | 3 | – | 5 | 6 | – | 5 |
| Mississippi State | 2 | – | 6 | 5 | – | 6 |
| Arkansas | 2 | – | 6 | 4 | – | 7 |
| Texas A&M | 1 | – | 7 | 4 | – | 7 |
| Vanderbilt | 1 | – | 7 | 4 | – | 7 |
Championship: Georgia vs TBD
^ – College Football Playoff participant; $ – Conference champion; y – Championship game participant; As of November 22, 2026; Rankings from CFP rankings

The 2026 Oklahoma Sooners football team represents the University of Oklahoma in the Southeastern Conference (SEC) during the 2026 NCAA Division I FBS football season, the 132nd season for the Oklahoma Sooners. They are led by fifth-year head coach Brent Venables and play their home games at Gaylord Family Oklahoma Memorial Stadium in Norman, Oklahoma.

== Schedule ==
Oklahoma and the SEC announced the 2026 conference schedule on December 11, 2025. The 2026 schedule consists of six home games, five away games, and one neutral-site game in the regular season. The Sooners will host two non-conference games against UTEP and New Mexico and will travel to Michigan. The Sooners will host four SEC conference opponents against Kentucky, South Carolina, Ole Miss and Texas A&M, and will travel to four SEC conference opponents against Georgia, Mississippi State, Florida, and Missouri. The Sooners will face Texas in Dallas at the Cotton Bowl in the 122nd Red River Rivalry.

| Date | Time | Opponent | Rank | Site | TV | Result | Attendance |
|---|---|---|---|---|---|---|---|
| September 4 | 7:00 p.m. | UTEP* | No. 10 | Gaylord Family Oklahoma Memorial Stadium; Norman, OK | SECN+ | W 51–0 | 84,315 |
| September 12 | 11:00 a.m. | at Michigan* | No. 11 | Michigan Stadium; Ann Arbor, MI (Big Noon Kickoff) | FOX | L 10−17 | 111,240 |
| September 19 | 6:30 p.m. | New Mexico* | No. 24 | Gaylord Family Oklahoma Memorial Stadium; Norman, OK | ESPN2 | W 14−6 | 83,423 |
| September 26 | 2:30 p.m. | at No. 2 Georgia | | Sanford Stadium; Athens, GA | ESPN | L 13−41 | 93,033 |
| October 10 | 2:30 p.m. | vs. No. 1 Texas | | Cotton Bowl; Dallas, TX (Red River Rivalry, SEC Nation) | ABC | W 27–24 | 92,100 |
| October 17 | 6:30 p.m. | No. 15 Kentucky | | Gaylord Family Oklahoma Memorial Stadium; Norman, OK | SECN | L 13–21 | 83,218 |
| October 24 | 2:30 p.m. | at Mississippi State | | Davis Wade Stadium; Starkville, MS | SECN | W 23–15 | 49,224 |
| October 31 | 3:15 p.m. | South Carolina^{†} | | Gaylord Family Oklahoma Memorial Stadium; Norman, OK | SECN | L 25–42 | 83,189 |
| November 7 | 6:45 p.m. | at No. 24 Florida | | Ben Hill Griffin Stadium; Gainesville, FL | SECN | W 23–7 | 90,442 |
| November 15 (Note: Originally scheduled for November 14, the game was moved to November 15 by the SEC after Ole Miss' charter flight was delayed as a result of the 2026 FAA nationwide ground stop and the team did not make alternative arrangements to arrive in time for the scheduled Saturday kickoff.) | 12:00 p.m. | No. 19 Ole Miss | | Gaylord Family Oklahoma Memorial Stadium; Norman, OK | SECN | W 24–17 | 83,226 |
| November 21 | 2:45 p.m. | Texas A&M | No. 22 | Gaylord Family Oklahoma Memorial Stadium; Norman, OK | ESPN2 | W 28–7 | 83,487 |
| November 28 | 3:15 p.m. | at Missouri | | Faurot Field; Columbia, MO (rivalry) | SECN | | |
*Non-conference game; ^{†}Homecoming; Rankings from AP Poll (and CFP Rankings, after November 3) – Released prior to game; All times are in Central time

== Rankings ==
Ranking movements Legend: ██ Increase in ranking ██ Decrease in ranking — = Not ranked RV = Received votes
| | Week | | | | | | | | | | | | | | | |
| Poll | Pre | 1 | 2 | 3 | 4 | 5 | 6 | 7 | 8 | 9 | 10 | 11 | 12 | 13 | 14 | Final |
|---|---|---|---|---|---|---|---|---|---|---|---|---|---|---|---|---|
| AP | 10 | 11 | 24 | RV | — | — | RV | — | — | — | — | RV | 19 | | | |
| Coaches | 9 | 10 | 21 | 24 | RV | — | RV | — | RV | — | RV | RV | 22 | | | |
| CFP | Not released | | | | | | | | | — | — | 22 | | | | Not released |

== Preseason ==
=== Award watch lists ===
| Award | Player | Position | Year |
|---|---|---|---|
| Lott Trophy | Peyton Bowen | DB | Sr. |
| Lott Trophy | Taylor Wein | DL | Sr. |
| Dodd Trophy | Brent Venables | HC | |
| Maxwell Award | John Mateer | QB | (redshirt) Sr. |

== Game summaries ==
=== vs UTEP ===
UTEP Miners (0–0) at No. 10 Oklahoma Sooners (0–0) – Game summary

| Quarter | 1 | 2 | 3 | 4 | Total |
|---|---|---|---|---|---|
| Miners | 0 | 0 | 0 | 0 | 0 |
| No. 10 Sooners | 21 | 6 | 17 | 7 | 51 |

at Gaylord Family Oklahoma Memorial Stadium • Norman, Oklahoma

- Date: September 4
- Game time: 7:00 p.m.
- Game weather: Sunny • Temperature: 98 °F (37 °C) • Wind: S at 20 miles per hour (32 km/h)
- Game attendance: 84,315
- Referee: Ted Pitts
- TV announcers (SECN+): Ted Emrich (play-by-play), Fozzy Whittaker (analyst), and Maria Martin (sideline)

Game information

First quarter

- (9:16) OU ― Lloyd Avant 1 yard rush, Tate Sandell kick (Drive: 12 plays, 76 yards, 5:39; OU 7―0)
- (7:27) OU ― Isaiah Sategna III 88 yard punt return, Tate Sandell kick (Drive: 3 plays, 4 yards 1:49; OU 14―0)
- (1:01) OU ― Rocky Beers 40 yard pass from John Mateer, Tate Sandell kick (Drive: 5 plays, 80 yards, 2:29; OU 21―0)

Second quarter

- (5:00) OU ― Tate Sandell 33 yard field goal (Drive: 11 plays, 53 yards, 5:51; OU 24―0)
- (1:42) OU ― Tate Sandell 32 yard field goal (Drive: 5 plays, 15 yards, 1:43; OU 27―0)

Third quarter

- (11:47) OU ― Isaiah Sategna III 34 yard pass from John Mateer, Tate Sandell kick (Drive: 3 plays, 57 yards, 0:46; OU 34―0)
- (8:22) OU ― Trell Harris 48 yard pass from John Mateer, Tate Sandell kick (Drive: 3 plays, 57 yards, 1:14; OU 41―0)
- (3:15) OU ― Liam Evans 34 yard feld goal (Drive: 6 plays, 19 yards, 2:49; OU 44―0)

Fourth quarter

- (12:11) OU ― Whitt Newbauer 3 yard rush, Liam Evans kick (Drive: 7 plays, 32 yards, 4:14; OU 51―0)

On September 4, No. 10 Oklahoma defeated UTEP 51–0 before 84,315 fans at Owen Field.

The game started with a 5:39 drive that ended in a 1-yard touchdown run by Lloyd Avant. On the next drive, UTEP went three-and-out, setting up an 88-yard punt return touchdown by Isaiah Sategna III. On UTEP's next drive, they reached the Oklahoma 15-yard line before missing a wide right field goal. On the next drive, Oklahoma scored on a 40-yard pass from John Mateer to Rocky Beers, and led 21–0 at the end of the first quarter. The second quarter was stagnant, with UTEP missing another field goal to start the second. Oklahoma would only score two field goals in the second by Tate Sandell. UTEP started the second half with the ball, but turned it over on a forced fumble by Peyton Bowen. Oklahoma scored two passing touchdowns in the third, including a 48-yard pass to Trell Harris. Oklahoma tacked on a late third-quarter field goal by Liam Evans to go up 44–0. Oklahoma scored its last touchdown on a three-yard rushing touchdown by backup quarterback Whitt Newbauer.

The 51–0 win over UTEP marked the first time since 2024 that Oklahoma scored 50 or more points, when they defeated Maine 59–14 on November 2, 2024.

| Statistics | UTEP | OU |
|---|---|---|
| First downs | 10 | 18 |
| Plays–yards | 56–198 | 58–401 |
| Rushes–yards | 38–112 | 39–170 |
| Passing yards | 86 | 231 |
| Passing: comp–att–int | 10–18–0 | 12–19–0 |
| Turnovers | 2 | 1 |
| Time of possession | 29:28 | 30:32 |

| Team | Category | Player | Statistics |
|---|---|---|---|
| UTEP | Passing | EJ Colson Jr. | 6/12, 52 yards |
| UTEP | Rushing | Raymond Moore III | 9 carries, 49 yards |
| UTEP | Receiving | Tavorus Jones | 3 receptions, 22 yards |
| Oklahoma | Passing | John Mateer | 11/17, 225 yards, 3 TD |
| Oklahoma | Rushing | Lloyd Avant | 15 carries, 79 yards, TD |
| Oklahoma | Receiving | Isaiah Sategna III | 4 receptions, 76 yards, TD |

=== at Michigan ===
No. 11 Oklahoma Sooners (1–0) at Michigan Wolverines (1–0) – Game summary

| Quarter | 1 | 2 | 3 | 4 | Total |
|---|---|---|---|---|---|
| No. 11 Sooners | 0 | 0 | 7 | 3 | 10 |
| Wolverines | 7 | 3 | 0 | 7 | 17 |

at Michigan Stadium • Ann Arbor, Michigan

- Date: September 12
- Game time: 11:00 a.m.
- Game weather: Sunny • Temperature: 75 °F (24 °C) • Wind: SW at 8 miles per hour (13 km/h)
- Game attendance: 111,240
- Referee: Daniel Gautreaux
- TV announcers (FOX): Gus Johnson (play-by-play), Joel Klatt (analyst), and Jenny Taft (sideline)

Game information

First quarter

- (0:47) MICH ― Bryce Underwood 38 yard run, Trey Butkowski kick (Drive: 6 plays, 91 yards, 3:40; Michigan 7―0)

Second quarter

- (2:28) MICH ― Trey Butkowski 40 yard field goal (Drive: 11 plays, 34 yards, 5:08; Michigan 10―0)

Third quarter

- (8:30) OU ― Mackenzie Alleyne 22 yard pass from John Mateer, Tate Sandell kick (Drive: 8 plays, 90 yards, 5:01; Michigan 10―7)

Fourth quarter

- (11:49) OU ― Tate Sandell 34 yard field goal (Drive: 8 plays, 83 yards, 4:33; Tied 10―10)
- (7:53) MICH ― Jordan Marshall 1 yard run, Trey Butkowski kick; Michigan 17―10)

On September 12, No. 11 Oklahoma fell to Michigan 17–10 before 111,240 fans at Michigan Stadium.

Bryce Underwood scored the first touchdown on a 38-yard run late in the first quarter. Michigan scored again late in the second with a 40-yard field goal by Trey Butkowski, leading 10–0 at halftime. Michigan received the ball after the half and went three-and-out. Oklahoma scored its first touchdown eight plays into its first second-half drive on a 22-yard pass from John Mateer to Mackenzie Alleyne. Oklahoma stopped Michigan again, and Tate Sandell tied it early in the fourth quarter with a 34-yard field goal. With 8:49 remaining, John Mateer threw an interception to Jyaire Hill, who returned it to the Oklahoma six-yard line. Jordan Marshall scored a one-yard rushing touchdown two plays later, putting Michigan up 17–10. Oklahoma failed to score on three successive drives, including a punt, a turnover on downs, and a drive that ended with a sack by Michigan defensive end Nate Marshall as time expired.

Oklahoma's loss to Michigan was the first time the school lost to the team after two previous meetings. This game also marked the first time Oklahoma was shut out in any half since October 11, 2025, when Texas beat Oklahoma 23–6 in the Red River Rivalry that year.

| Statistics | OU | MICH |
|---|---|---|
| First downs | 17 | 14 |
| Plays–yards | 62−289 | 58−263 |
| Rushes–yards | 29−100 | 41−152 |
| Passing yards | 189 | 111 |
| Passing: comp–att–int | 17−33−1 | 9−17 |
| Turnovers | 2 | 0 |
| Time of possession | 26:43 | 33:17 |

| Team | Category | Player | Statistics |
|---|---|---|---|
| Oklahoma | Passing | John Mateer | 17/33, 189 yards, TD, INT |
| Oklahoma | Rushing | John Mateer | 13 carries, 45 yards |
| Oklahoma | Receiving | Rocky Beers | 6 receptions, 94 yards |
| Michigan | Passing | Bryce Underwood | 9/17, 111 yards |
| Michigan | Rushing | Bryce Underwood | 18 carries, 87 yards, TD |
| Michigan | Receiving | JJ Buchanan | 2 receptions, 48 yards |

=== vs New Mexico ===
New Mexico Lobos (2–0) at No. 24 Oklahoma Sooners (1–1) – Game summary

| Quarter | 1 | 2 | 3 | 4 | Total |
|---|---|---|---|---|---|
| Lobos | 0 | 6 | 0 | 0 | 6 |
| No. 24 Sooners | 0 | 7 | 7 | 0 | 14 |

at Gaylord Family Oklahoma Memorial Stadium • Norman, Oklahoma

- Date: September 19
- Game time: 6:30 p.m.
- Game weather: Sunny • Temperature: 95 °F (35 °C) • Wind: S at 12 miles per hour (19 km/h)
- Game attendance: 83,423
- Referee: Marc Curles
- TV announcers (ESPN2): Jay Alter (play-by-play), Tom Luginbill (analyst), and Lauren Sisler (sideline)

Game information

First Quarter

- No Scoring

Second Quarter

- (13:49) OU ― Hayden Hansen 29 yard pass from John Mateer, Tate Sandell kick (Drive: 12 plays, 80 yards, 6:46; OU 7―0)
- (4:00) UNM ― Grant Glasgow 24 yard field goal (Drive: 7 plays, 53 yards, 3:44; OU 7―3)
- (1:48) UM ― Grant Glasgow 42 yard field goal (Drive: 6 plays, -2 yards, 1:21; OU 7―6)

Third Quarter

- (8:05) OU ― Isaiah Sategna III 53 yard pass from John Mateer, Tate Sandell kick (Drive: 5 plays, 70 yards, 1:47; OU 14―6)

Fourth Quarter

- No Scoring

On September 19, No. 24 Oklahoma defeated New Mexico 14–6 in a close match before 83,423 fans at Owen Field.

Oklahoma got the ball to start, but it ended in an interception three plays in. Neither team scored in the first quarter. Oklahoma struck first with a 29-yard pass from John Mateer to Hayden Hansen for a touchdown. New Mexico tacked on two field goals late in the second quarter, helped by an Oklahoma punt deep in their own territory and another John Mateer interception with just over three minutes left. Oklahoma drove to the New Mexico 23-yard line with under a minute left, but chose to chew clock and set up a 41-yard field goal attempt by Tate Sandell, which missed to the right. Many fans booed the team during the first half and heading into the locker room, including after John Matter's two interceptions and the poor sequence of plays that ended the first half with the missed field goal.

New Mexico got the ball to start the second half down 6–7. New Mexico reached the Oklahoma 48-yard line, but a sack and a holding penalty pushed them back, forcing them to punt. On the ensuing drive, Oklahoma scored a touchdown on a five-play drive, capped by a 53-yard pass from John Mateer to Isaiah Sategna III. It was the last time either team scored. Oklahoma's two fourth-quarter drives ended in punts. New Mexico's last drive looked promising after driving into Oklahoma's red zone and converting on three third downs. With under three minutes remaining, David Stone stopped them on fourth down. Oklahoma exhausted New Mexico's timeouts, got a first down, and knelt the ball to end the game.

The matchup marked the first time New Mexico and Oklahoma met in football since 1935. Oklahoma's win over New Mexico 14–6 also marked the lowest amount of points Oklahoma scored in a game they won since October 9, 2004, when they defeated Texas 12–0 in that year's Red River Rivalry.

| Statistics | UNM | OU |
|---|---|---|
| First downs | 12 | 14 |
| Plays–yards | 57−185 | 58−299 |
| Rushes–yards | 38−69 | 32−61 |
| Passing yards | 116 | 238 |
| Passing: comp–att–int | 8−19 | 19−26−2 |
| Time of possession | 34:08 | 25:52 |

| Team | Category | Player | Statistics |
|---|---|---|---|
| New Mexico | Passing | Toa Fa'avae | 4/10, 79 yards |
| New Mexico | Rushing | Kieffer Sibley | 9 carries, 41 yards |
| New Mexico | Receiving | Cade Keith | 5 receptions, 78 yards |
| Oklahoma | Passing | John Mateer | 19/25, 238 yards, 2 TD, 2 INT |
| Oklahoma | Rushing | Lloyd Avant | 8 carries, 27 yards |
| Oklahoma | Receiving | Isaiah Sategna III | 6 receptions, 101 yards, TD |

=== at No. 2 Georgia ===
Oklahoma Sooners (2–1) at No. 2 Georgia Bulldogs (3–0) – Game summary

| Quarter | 1 | 2 | 3 | 4 | Total |
|---|---|---|---|---|---|
| Sooners | 0 | 0 | 6 | 7 | 13 |
| No. 2 Bulldogs | 7 | 21 | 3 | 10 | 41 |

at Sanford Stadium • Athens, Georgia

- Date: September 26
- Game time: 2:30 p.m.
- Game weather: Sunny • Temperature: 81 °F (27 °C) • Wind: W at 4 miles per hour (6.4 km/h)
- Game attendance: 93,033
- Referee: Adam Savoie
- TV announcers (ESPN): Bob Wischusen (play-by-play), Louis Riddick (analyst), and Stormy Buonantony (sideline)

Game information

First Quarter

- (3:16) UGA ― Chauncey Bowens 2 yard rush, Peyton Woodring kick (Drive: 11 plays, 79 yards, 6:56; UGA 7―0)

Second Quarter

- (14:27) UGA ― Talyn Taylor 35 yard pass from Gunner Stockton, Peyton Woodring kick (Drive: 5 plays, 54 yards, 2:11; UGA 14―0)
- (9:14) UGA ― Chris Cole 85 yard fumble recovery, Peyton Woodring kick (Drive: 9 plays, -25 yards, 5:22; UGA 21―0)
- (0:57) UGA ― Chauncey Bowens 6 yard rush, Peyton Woodring kick (Drive: 2 plays, 11 yards, 0:51; UGA 28―0)

Third Quarter

- (10:31) OU ― Rocky Beers 17 yard pass from John Mateer, Lloyd Avant rush attempt failed (Drive: 5 plays, 34 yards, 2:13; UGA 28―6)
- (7:58) UGA ― Peyton Woodring 45 yard field goal (Drive: 4 plays, 1 yard, 0:52; UGA 31―6)

Fourth Quarter

- (12:33) UGA ― Dwight Phillips Jr. 54 yard rush, Peyton Woodring kick (Drive: 4 plays, 81 yards, 1:38; UGA 38―6)
- (8:15) Peyton Woodring 49 yard field goal (Drive: 5 plays, 36 yards, 1:59; UGA 41―6)
- (3:23) OU ― Manny Choice 14 yard pass from John Mateer, Tate Sandell kick (Drive: 9 plays, 75 yards, 4:50; UGA 41―13)

On September 26, Oklahoma lost to No. 2 Georgia in a blowout 41–13 before 93,033 fans at Sanford Stadium.

Neither team scored on their first possession. Georgia scored first with a two-yard rushing touchdown by Chauncey Bowens to lead 7–0 late in the first quarter. Georgia scored again early in the second quarter on a long 35-yard pass from Gunner Stockton to Talyn Taylor. On Oklahoma's next drive, they reached the Georgia two-yard line on third-and-goal. However, John Mateer fumbled the ball as he was attempting to pass on a play-action power-o-play: the ball was recovered by Chris Cole; he returned it for an 85-yard fumble-recovery touchdown to lead 21–0. Oklahoma would end the first half with two more turnovers by John Mateer, including an interception to KJ Bolden and another fumble recovery by Chris Cole; the latter led to another rushing touchdown by Chauncey Bowens to lead 28–0 at halftime.

Early in the second quarter, Oklahoma scored its first touchdown on a 17-yard pass from John Matter to Rocky Beers; Omarion Robinson intercepted the ball at the Georgia 35-yard line on the previous Georgia drive to assist the drive. The ensuing two-point conversion by Lloyd Avant was unsuccessful on his rushing attempt. Georgia added two field goals by Peyton Woodring in the second half, and a 54-yard rushing touchdown by Dwight Phillips Jr. Oklahoma scored its last points late in the fourth quarter on a 14-yard passing touchdown from John Mateer to Manny Choice.

The game marked the second meeting between the two schools and the first between them since the 2018 Rose Bowl. It was the Sooners' worst loss since the 31-point defeat by Texas on October 12, 2024. Brent Venables considered benching John Mateer.

| Statistics | OU | UGA |
|---|---|---|
| First downs | 16 | 12 |
| Plays–yards | 69−296 | 53−308 |
| Rushes–yards | 35−65 | 26−131 |
| Passing yards | 231 | 177 |
| Passing: comp–att–int | 25−34−1 | 15−27−1 |
| Time of possession | 35:27 | 24:33 |

| Team | Category | Player | Statistics |
|---|---|---|---|
| Oklahoma | Passing | John Mateer | 25/34, 231 yards, 2 TD, 1 INT |
| Oklahoma | Rushing | Lloyd Avant | 10 carries, 23 yards |
| Oklahoma | Receiving | Rocky Beers | 8 receptions, 84 yards, TD |
| Georgia | Passing | Gunner Stockton | 14/25, 171 yards, TD, INT |
| Georgia | Rushing | Dwight Phillips Jr. | 8 carries, 84 yards, TD |
| Georgia | Receiving | Talyn Taylor | 4 receptions, 110 yards, TD |

=== vs. No. 1 Texas (Red River Rivalry) ===
No. 1 Texas Longhorns (4–0) vs. Oklahoma Sooners (2–2) – Game summary

| Quarter | 1 | 2 | 3 | 4 | Total |
|---|---|---|---|---|---|
| No. 1 Longhorns | 7 | 10 | 0 | 7 | 24 |
| Sooners | 0 | 7 | 3 | 17 | 27 |

at Cotton Bowl • Dallas, Texas

- Date: October 10
- Game time: 2:30 p.m.
- Game weather: Sunny • Temperature: 86 °F (30 °C) • Wind: S at 7 miles per hour (11 km/h)
- Game attendance: 92,100
- Referee: James Carter
- TV announcers (ABC): Sean McDonough (play-by-play), Greg McElroy (analyst), and Katie George (sideline)

Game information

First Quarter

- (6:56) TEX ― Cam Coleman 41 yard pass from Arch Manning, Gianni Spetic kick (Drive: 1 play, 41 yards, 0:08; TEX 7―0)

Second Quarter

- (14:11) OU ― Dakoda Fields fumble recovery, Tate Sandell kick (Drive: 4 plays, -6 yards, 2:15; Tied 7―7)
- (10:09) TEX ― Ryan Wingo 34 yard pass from Arch Manning, Gianni Septic kick (Drive: 9 plays, 75 yards, 4:02; TEX 14―7)
- (0:12) TEX ― Gianni Spetic 23 yard field goal (Drive: 10 plays, 60 yards, 3:31; TEX 17―7)

Third Quarter

- (10:56) OU ― Tate Sandell 53 yard field goal (Drive: 7 plays, 52 yards, 2:38; TEX 17―10)

Fourth Quarter

- (14:48) OU ― Lloyd Avant 2 yard rush, Tate Sandell kick (Drive: 6 plays, 47 yards, 4:00; Tied 17―17)
- (10:07) OU ― Peyton Bowen 42 yard INT return, Tate Sandell kick (Drive: 2 plays, - 3 yards, 1:15; OU 24―17)
- (6:32) TEX ― Jermaine Bishop Jr. 15 yard pass from Arch Manning, Gianni Spetic kick (Drive: 7 plays, 75 yards, 3:35; Tied 24―24)
- (0:00) OU ― Tate Sandell 47 yard field goal (Drive: 4 plays, 31 yards, 0:19; OU 27―24)

On October 10, at the 122nd Red River Rivalry matchup, Oklahoma upset No. 1 Texas 27–24 in a highly competitive game before 92,100 fans in the Cotton Bowl.

Oklahoma started with possession and went three-and-out. Neither team achieved a first down on their first two drives. After Oklahoma's third drive, Texas got the ball on a punt and scored on a one-play drive that culminated in a passing touchdown from Arch Manning to Cam Coleman to lead 7-0. After three more drives, Oklahoma scored on a blocked punt in the end zone to tie it 7–7; Danny Okoye blocked the punt, and Dakoda Fields recovered it just short of the end line. Texas scored on the next drive on a 34-yard pass from Arch Manning to Ryan Wingo to go ahead 14–7. On Oklahoma's next drive, they failed to score as Tate Sandell missed a 53-yard field goal. On Texas' final first-half drive, they drove inside Oklahoma's red zone, but were stopped at the five-yard line, forcing Gianni Spetic to kick a 23-yard field goal to lead 17–7 just before halftime.

Texas got the ball to start the second half, but they failed to score on their first three drives: two were three-and-outs. After Texas' first drive, Oklahoma cut the lead to 10–17 after Tate Sandell made a 53-yard field goal. During Texas' third punt of the half, several Texas players tried to push Isaiah Sategna III on the ball, causing a scuffle. Oklahoma then tied the game early in the fourth quarter on a two-yard rushing touchdown by Lloyd Avant. Several Texas penalties aided the scoring drive, including a roughing-the-passer penalty by Rasheem Biles on a double pass play that was intercepted and called back, as well as a pass-interference penalty by Kade Phillips when Oklahoma could have been stopped on third-and-goal. Oklahoma took a 24–17 lead with 10:07 remaining on a 42-yard interception return for a touchdown by Peyton Bowen. Texas responded on the next drive with a 15-yard pass from Arch Manning to Jermaine Bishop Jr. for a touchdown, tying the game. Texas had a chance to take the lead with a field goal with two minutes remaining, but it missed wide right.

After another unsuccessful Oklahoma drive, Texas got the ball back on a punt with under a minute remaining to attempt a game-winning drive. However, Arch Manning threw another interception to Courtland Guillory with 19 seconds remaining. John Mateer completed two crucial passes to Isaiah Sategna III, getting Oklahoma into field goal range. Tate Sandell won the game with a 47-yard field goal down the middle.

Oklahoma's defeat of No. 1 Texas was the first time Oklahoma defeated Texas when they were ranked No. 1. It was also the first win for Oklahoma against a No. 1 team since they defeated Missouri 38–17 in the 2007 Big 12 Championship Game on December 1, 2007. The game also marked the first time Oklahoma scored a touchdown against Texas since Nic Anderson last did so in 2023.

| Statistics | TEX | OU |
|---|---|---|
| First downs | 16 | 14 |
| Plays–yards | 63–382 | 57–238 |
| Rushes–yards | 32–122 | 31–83 |
| Passing yards | 260 | 155 |
| Passing: comp–att–int | 19–31–2 | 18–26–0 |
| Time of possession | 29:29 | 30:31 |

| Team | Category | Player | Statistics |
|---|---|---|---|
| Texas | Passing | Arch Manning | 19/31, 260 yards, 3 TD, 2 INT |
| Texas | Rushing | Derrek Cooper | 8 carries, 41 yards |
| Texas | Receiving | Cam Coleman | 5 receptions, 110 yards, TD |
| Oklahoma | Passing | John Mateer | 18/26, 155 yards |
| Oklahoma | Rushing | Lloyd Avant | 10 carries, 72 yards, TD |
| Oklahoma | Receiving | Isaiah Sategna III | 5 receptions, 64 yards |

=== vs No. 15 Kentucky ===
No. 15 Kentucky Wildcats (5–1) at Oklahoma Sooners (3–2) – Game summary

| Quarter | 1 | 2 | 3 | 4 | Total |
|---|---|---|---|---|---|
| No.15 Wildcats | 7 | 0 | 0 | 14 | 21 |
| Sooners | 3 | 7 | 3 | 0 | 13 |

at Gaylord Family Oklahoma Memorial Stadium • Norman, Oklahoma

- Date: October 17
- Game time: 6:30 p.m.
- Game weather: Sunny • Temperature: 59 °F (15 °C) • Wind: E at 5 miles per hour (8.0 km/h)
- Game attendance: 83,218
- Referee: Jason Autrey
- TV announcers (SECN): Dave Neal (play-by-play), Cole Cubelic (analyst), and Tori Petry (sideline)

Game information

First Quarter

- (8:36) UK — Willie Rodriguez 2 yard pass from Kenny Minchey, Adam Zougaui kick (Drive: 13 plays, 67 yards, 6:20; UK 7—0)
- (1:33) OU — Tate Sandell 44 yard field goal (Drive: 13 plays, 49 yards, 7:03; UK 7—3)

Second Quarter

- (0:30) OU — Rocky Beers 20 yard pass from John Mateer, Tate Sandell kick (Drive: 12 plays, 90 yards, 3:54; OU 10—7)

Third Quarter

- (6:32) OU — Tate Sandell 26 yard field goal (Drive: 10 pays, 66 yards, 4:25; OU 13—7)

Fourth Quarter

- (12:53) UK — Willie Rodriguez 12 yard pass from Kenny Minchey, Adam Zouagui kick (Drive: 7 plays, 44 yards, 2:42; UK 14—13)
- (1:17) UK — Jordan Castell 41 yard INT return, Adam Zouagui kick (Drive: 6 plays, 28 yards, 1:26; UK 21—13)

On October 17, following the historic upset over Texas, Oklahoma fell to No. 15 Kentucky in a close 21–13 game before 83,218 fans at Owen Field in its home SEC opener.

Kentucky got the ball first and scored about halfway through the first quarter on a two-yard pass from Kenny Minchey to Willie Rodriguez for a touchdown. Oklahoma responded on the next drive with another long drive that ended in a 44-yard field goal by Tate Sandell, cutting the Wildcat's lead to 7–3. Oklahoma had a chance to kick another field goal on their drive to cut the lead to 7–6, but a fake field goal was attempted; Tate Sandell rolled out left before the snap, and Jacob Ulrich attempted to do a jump pass to Rocky Beers, but it was misthrown and ended in an interception by Jordan Castell. Oklahoma got the ball back after another Kentucky punt and capitalized on a 20-yard pass from John Mateer to Rocky Beers a half-minute before halftime to lead 10–7.

Oklahoma received the ball to start the second half. Neither team scored on their first possession and punted. Oklahoma extended the lead to 13–7 on a 26-yard field goal by Tate Sandell. On Oklahoma's next drive, they had a chance to extend the lead late in the third quarter when they reached the Kentucky 38-yard line; Mateer threw an interception that Mi'Quise Humphrey-Grace broke up, and Ty Bryant returned it to the Oklahoma 44-yard line. Kentucky capitalized on the interception with another passing touchdown: Kinney Michey to Willie Rodriguez for 12 yards to take a 14–13 lead. Despite a goal-line stand by Oklahoma just over halfway through the fourth quarter, Oklahoma's offense failed to score on its last three drives. John Mateer threw two interceptions on those last two drives; Jordan Castell returned the first for a 41-yard interception return for a touchdown, giving the Wildcats a 21–13 lead. The second interception effectively ended the game, as Kentucky knelt the ball to end it.

The game between Kentucky and Oklahoma marked the first time the teams had met since 1982.

| Statistics | UK | OU |
|---|---|---|
| First downs | 14 | 19 |
| Plays–yards | 54−230 | 72−346 |
| Rushes–yards | 26−72 | 31−76 |
| Passing yards | 158 | 270 |
| Passing: comp–att–int | 21−28 | 24−41−4 |
| Time of possession | 28:36 | 31:24 |

| Team | Category | Player | Statistics |
|---|---|---|---|
| Kentucky | Passing | Kenny Minchey | 21/28, 158 yards, 2 TD |
| Kentucky | Rushing | Jason Patterson | 12 carries, 38 yards |
| Kentucky | Receiving | Nic Anderson | 5 receptions, 48 yards |
| Oklahoma | Passing | John Mateer | 24/40, 270 yards, TD, 3 INT |
| Oklahoma | Rushing | Lloyd Avant | 8 carries, 31 yards |
| Oklahoma | Receiving | Isaiah Sategna III | 8 receptions, 83 yards |

=== at Mississippi State ===
Oklahoma Sooners (3–3) at Mississippi State Bulldogs (4–2) – Game summary

| Quarter | 1 | 2 | 3 | 4 | Total |
|---|---|---|---|---|---|
| Sooners | 3 | 7 | 10 | 3 | 23 |
| Bulldogs | 0 | 0 | 7 | 8 | 15 |

at Davis Wade Stadium • Starkville, Mississippi

- Date: October 24
- Game time: 2:30 p.m.
- Game weather: Sunny • Temperature: 77 °F (25 °C) • Wind: SE at 6 miles per hour (9.7 km/h)
- Game attendance: 49,224
- Referee: Ted Pitts
- TV announcers (SECN): Dave Neal (play-by-play), Cole Cubelic (analyst), and Tori Petry (sideline)

Game information

First Quarter

- (11:10) OU ― Tate Sandell 42 yard field goal (Drive: 5 plays, 20 yards, 2:22; OU 3―0)

Second Quarter

- (13:44) OU ― Isaiah Sategna III 36 yard pass from John Mateer, Tate Sandell kick (Drive: 14 plays, 96 yards, 5:49; OU 10―0)

Third Quarter

- (13:44) OU ― Rocky Beers 32 yard pass from John Mateer , Tate Sandell kick (Drive: 3 plays, 75 yards, 1:16; OU 17―0)
- (6:55) MMST ― Camden Capehart 18 yard pass from Sam West, Kyle Ferrie kick (Drive: 6 plays, 51 yards, 2:29; OU 17―7)
- (3:33) OU ― Tate Sandell 30 yard field goal (Drive: 7 plays, 63 yards, 3:22; OU 20―7)

Fourth Quarter

- (4:26) OU ― Tate Sandell 38 yard field goal (Drive: 7 plays, 56 yards, 3:41; OU 23―7)
- (2:10) MSST ― Sanfrisco Magee 42 yard pass from Billy Puckett, Sanfrisco Magee pass from Billy Pickett for two-point conversion (Drive: 8 plays, 75 yards, 2:16; OU 23―15)

On October 24, Oklahoma beat Mississippi State 23–15 in front of 49,224 fans at Davis Wade Stadium.

Mississippi received the ball to start the game and went three-and-out on their first two possessions. Oklahoma scored on its first drive with a 42-yard field goal by Tate Sandell; Mississippi State's first drive ended with a short 13-yard punt by Ethan Pulliam. On the last play of Mississippi State's third drive, Kamario Taylor suffered a season-ending turf toe injury as he was trying to run beyond and outside the passing pocket to try and convert on 4th & 5, but ended up being sacked by Owen Heinecke for a loss of two and a turnover on downs. Oklahoma had a chance to extend the lead on the next drive at the start of the second quarter, but Tate Sandell missed a 45-yard field goal. Mississippi State had a chance late in the second quarter to score a touchdown inside Oklahoma's red zone, but Billy Puckett fumbled on a two-yard rush at the Oklahoma four-yard line. Oklahoma capitalized on the turnover to end the first half with a 36-yard passing touchdown from John Mateer to Isaiah Sategna III, leading 10–0.

Oklahoma scored on their first possession of the second half on a 32-yard touchdown pass from John Mateer to Rocky Beers, leading 17–0. Mississippi State scored on its second drive of the second half with an 18-yard double pass from tight end Sam West to wide receiver Camden Capehart. Oklahoma responded with a 30-yard field goal by Tate Sandell. Oklahoma then stopped Mississippi State on their next three drives, including an interception by Peyton Bowen in their end zone on the last. However, Oklahoma failed to score after the first two Mississippi stops, with Tate Sandell missing two consecutive field goals. After the Mississippi interception, Tate Sandell made a 38-yard field goal to push the lead to 23–7. Mississippi State responded with a 42-yard pass from Billy Puckett to Sanfrisco Magee and a two-point conversion to cut the deficit to 23–15. Mississippi State could not stop Oklahoma on their next drive after exhausting their timeouts, and Oklahoma got a first down, ending the game after they knelt the ball.

The matchup between Oklahoma and Mississippi State marked the first time that the schools played each other.

| Statistics | OU | MSST |
|---|---|---|
| First downs | 21 | 17 |
| Plays–yards | 70–467 | 63–352 |
| Rushes–yards | 41–184 | 33–166 |
| Passing yards | 283 | 186 |
| Passing: comp–att–int | 22–29 | 20–30–1 |
| Time of possession | 33:16 | 26:44 |

| Team | Category | Player | Statistics |
|---|---|---|---|
| Oklahoma | Passing | John Mateer | 22/29, 283 yards, 2 TD |
| Oklahoma | Rushing | Tory Blaylock | 12 carries, 71 yards |
| Oklahoma | Receiving | Isaiah Sategna III | 8 receptions, 164 yards, TD |
| Mississippi State | Passing | Billy Puckett | 17/24, 158 yards, TD, INT |
| Mississippi State | Rushing | Fluff Bothwell | 17 carries, 111 yards |
| Mississippi State | Receiving | Sanfrisco Magee | 3 receptions, 65 yards, TD |

=== vs South Carolina ===
South Carolina Gamecocks (4–3) at Oklahoma Sooners (4–3) – Game summary

| Quarter | 1 | 2 | 3 | 4 | Total |
|---|---|---|---|---|---|
| Gamecocks | 7 | 21 | 7 | 7 | 42 |
| Sooners | 0 | 10 | 0 | 15 | 25 |

at Gaylord Family Oklahoma Memorial Stadium • Norman, Oklahoma

- Date: October 31
- Game time: 3:15 p.m.
- Game weather: Cloudy • Temperature: 62 °F (17 °C) • Wind: SE at 6 miles per hour (9.7 km/h)
- Game attendance: 83,189
- Referee: Tim Barker
- TV announcers (SECN): Taylor Zarzour (play-by-play), Gene Chizik (analyst), and Michella Chester (sideline)

Game information

First Quarter

- (6:26) SC ― LaNorris Sellers 15 yard rush, Malik Orsan kick (Drive: 8 plays, 55 yards, 3:26; SC 7―0)

Second Quarter

- (14:05) OU ― Kip Lewis 30 yard INT return, Tate Sandell kick (Tied 7―7)
- (11:20) SC ― Christian Clark 1 yard rush, Malik Orsan kick (Drive: 6 plays, 75 yards, 2:45; SC 14―7)
- (9:19) SC ― DJ Black 84 yard pass from LaNorris Sellers, Malik Orsan kick (Drive: 3 plays, 82 yards, 1:23; SC 21―7)
- (2:49) OU ― Tate Sandell 52 yard field goal (Drive: 12 plays, 41 yards, 6:30; SC 21―10)
- (0:16) SC ― Nyck Harbor 8 yard pass from LaNorris Sellers, Mallik Orsan kick (Drive: 8 plays, 75 yards, 2:33; SC 28―10)

Third Quarter

- (2:04) SC ― LaNorris Sellers 11 yard rush, Malik Orsan kick (Drive: 12 plays, 75 yards, 5:38; SC 35―10)

Fourth Quarter

- (14:53) OU ― Ivan Carreon 34 yard pass from John Mateer, John Mateer pass attempt failed (Drive: 3 plays 80 yards, 1:34; SC 35―16)
- (13:13) SC ― Mazeo Bennett Jr. 79 yard pass from LaNorris Sellers, Malik Orsan kick (Drive: 3 plays, 80 yards, 1:34; SC 42―16)
- (9:46) OU ― Tate Sandell 34 yard field goal (Drive: 11 plays, 59 yards, 3:27; SC 42―19)
- (2:59) OU ― Ivan Carreon 10 yard pass from John Mateer, John Mateer pass attempt failed (Drive: 11 plays, 84 yards, 2:59; SC 42―25)

On October 31, South Carolina beat Oklahoma 42–25 in a blowout before 83,189 fans at Owen Field.

South Carolina got the ball first, and both teams punted on their opening drives. South Carolina scored first with a 15-yard rushing touchdown by LaNorris Sellers. Oklahoma tied the game on South Carolina's fourth drive via a 30-yard interception return by Kip Lewis. After that, South Carolina scored touchdowns on its final three first-half possessions: two passing touchdowns by Sellers and one rushing touchdown by Christian Clark. Oklahoma scored only a 52-yard field goal by Tate Sandell after South Carolina scored their third touchdown. Before the field goal, on an injury timeout, many fans, especially the student section, chanted for Oklahoma offensive coordinator Ben Arbuckle to be fired.

The only third-quarter scoring play came on an 11-yard rushing touchdown by LaNorris Sellers. Oklahoma scored its first offensive points early in the fourth quarter on a deep 34-yard passing touchdown from John Mateer to Ivan Carreon. South Carolina responded on the next drive, on third down, with a deep pass from LaNorris Sellers to Mazeo Bennett Jr. for a 79-yard touchdown for their last points of the game. Oklahoma scored on its next two drives with a 34-yard field goal by Tate Sandell and another passing touchdown from John Mateer to Ivan Carreon for 10 yards. Both of Oklahoma's fourth-quarter passing touchdowns ended with failed two-point conversions on John Mateer pass attempts. Oklahoma had a chance to score with just over half a minute remaining, but it ended in a turnover on downs at the South Carolina one-yard line on a rush attempt by Lloyd Avant.

The game between South Carolina and Oklahoma was their third meeting. Oklahoma’s 42–25 loss was its first by more than two scores since October 19, 2024, when South Carolina beat Oklahoma that year 35–9. Two days after the game, Oklahoma dismissed Ben Arbuckle in his second season as offensive coordinator due to a lack of consistency and development.

| Statistics | SC | OU |
|---|---|---|
| First downs | 22 | 24 |
| Plays–yards | 71−521 | 74−359 |
| Rushes–yards | 44−212 | 31−115 |
| Passing yards | 309 | 244 |
| Passing: comp–att–int | 21−27−3 | 26−43 |
| Time of possession | 32:14 | 27:46 |

| Team | Category | Player | Statistics |
|---|---|---|---|
| South Carolina | Passing | LaNorris Sellers | 19/24, 301 yards, 3 TD, 2 INT |
| South Carolina | Rushing | LaNorris Sellers | 13 carries, 96 yards, 2 TD |
| South Carolina | Receiving | Mazeo Bennett Jr. | 4 receptions, 107 yards, TD |
| Oklahoma | Passing | John Mateer | 26/43, 244 yards, 2 TD |
| Oklahoma | Rushing | Tory Blaylock | 6 carries, 32 yards |
| Oklahoma | Receiving | Ivan Carreon | 5 receptions, 88 yards, 2 TD |

=== at No. 24 Florida ===
Oklahoma Sooners (4–4) at No. 24 Florida Gators (5–3) – Game summary

| Quarter | 1 | 2 | 3 | 4 | Total |
|---|---|---|---|---|---|
| Sooners | 3 | 10 | 0 | 10 | 23 |
| No. 24 Gators | 0 | 7 | 0 | 0 | 7 |

at Ben Hill Griffin Stadium • Gainesville, Florida

- Date: November 7
- Game time: 6:45 p.m.
- Game weather: Clear • Temperature: 66 °F (19 °C) • Wind: S at 4 miles per hour (6.4 km/h)
- Game attendance: 90,422
- Referee: Jeff Heaser
- TV announcers (SECN): Matt Schumacker (play-by-play), Aaron Murray (analyst), and Taylor Davis (sideline)

Game information

First Quarter

- (7:36) OU ― Tate Sandell 41 yard field goal (Drive: 10 plays, 61 yards, 5:29; OU 3―0)

Second Quarter

- (9:42) OU ― Hayden Hansen 3 yard pass from John Mateer, Tate Sandell kick (Drive: 15 plays, 84 yards, 7:11; OU 10―0)
- (3:00) UF ― Jadan Baugh 15 yard rush, Patrick Durkin kick (Drive: 4 plays, 52 yards, 2:03; OU 10―7)
- (0:36) OU ― Tate Sandell 48 yard field goal (Drive: 8 plays, 44 yards, 2:20; OU 13―7)

Third Quarter

- No Scoring

Fourth Quarter

- (4:56) OU ― Isaiah Sategna III 6 yard pass from John Mateer, Tate Sandell kick (Drive: 20 plays, 89 yards, 12:45; OU 20―7)
- (1:56) OU ― Tate Sandell 31 yard field goal (Drive: 6 plays, 4 yards, 2:24; OU 23―7)

| Statistics | OU | FLA |
|---|---|---|
| First downs | 20 | 11 |
| Plays–yards | 73−351 | 47−203 |
| Rushes–yards | 40−144 | 25−70 |
| Passing yards | 207 | 103 |
| Passing: comp–att–int | 21−33 | 10−22−2 |
| Time of possession | 37:50 | 22:10 |

| Team | Category | Player | Statistics |
|---|---|---|---|
| Oklahoma | Passing | John Mateer | 21/33, 207 yards, 2 TD |
| Oklahoma | Rushing | John Mateer | 14 carries, 56 yards |
| Oklahoma | Receiving | Rocky Beers | 4 receptions, 72 yards |
| Florida | Passing | Tramell Jones Jr. | 10/22, 133 yards, 2 INT |
| Florida | Rushing | Jadan Baugh | 8 carries, 35 yards, TD |
| Florida | Receiving | Duke Clark | 4 receptions, 70 yards |

=== vs No. 19 Ole Miss ===
No. 19 Ole Miss Rebels (6–3) at Oklahoma Sooners (5–4) – Game summary

| Quarter | 1 | 2 | 3 | 4 | Total |
|---|---|---|---|---|---|
| No. 19 Rebels | 0 | 7 | 0 | 7 | 14 |
| Sooners | 14 | 0 | 7 | 3 | 24 |

at Gaylord Family Oklahoma Memorial Stadium • Norman, Oklahoma

- Date: November 15
- Game time: 12:00 p.m.
- Game weather: Rain • Temperature: 45 °F (7 °C) • Wind: N at 10 miles per hour (16 km/h)
- Game attendance: 83,226
- Referee: Adam Savoie
- TV announcers (SECN): Roy Philpott (play-by-play), Matt Stinchcomb (analyst), and Michella Chester (sideline)

Game information

First Quarter

- (5:54) OU ― John Mateer 8 yard rush, Tate Sandell kick (Drive: 13 plays, 74 yards, 7:40; OU 7―0)
- (3:29) OU ― Isaiah Sategna III 75 yard punt return, Tate Sandell kick (Drive: 4 plays, 17 yards, 2:21; OU 14―0)

Second Quarter

- (13:27) OM ― Joshua Dye 19 yard rush, Lucas Carneiro kick (Drive: 11 plays, 75 yards, 5:02; OU 14―7)

Third Quarter

- (8:21) OU ― Jonathan Hatton Jr. 5 yard rush, Tate Sandell kick (Drive: 12 plays, 70 yards, 6:33; OU 21―7)

Fourth Quarter

- (11:45) OM ― Caleb Odom 26 yard pass from Trinidad Chambliss, Lucas Carneiro kick (Drive: 7 plays, 79 yards, 1:37; OU 21―14)
- (4:52) OU ― Tate Sandell 41 yard field goal (Drive: 12 plays, 51 yards, 6:53; OU 24―14)
- (0:42) OM — Lucas Carneiro 41 yard field goal (Drive: 11 plays, 43 yards, 2:22; OU 24—17)

| Statistics | MISS | OU |
|---|---|---|
| First downs | 19 | 19 |
| Plays–yards | 59−306 | 68−299 |
| Rushes–yards | 31−179 | 49−188 |
| Passing yards | 127 | 111 |
| Passing: comp–att–int | 14−28 | 10−19 |
| Time of possession | 23:39 | 36:31 |

| Team | Category | Player | Statistics |
|---|---|---|---|
| Ole Miss | Passing | Trinidad Chambliss | 14/27, 127 yards, TD |
| Ole Miss | Rushing | Trinidad Chambliss | 11 carries, 84 yards |
| Ole Miss | Receiving | Caleb Odom | 4 receptions, 56 yards, TD |
| Oklahoma | Passing | John Mateer | 10/19, 111 yards |
| Oklahoma | Rushing | John Mateer | 16 carries, 70 yards, TD |
| Oklahoma | Receiving | Rocky Beers | 4 receptions, 39 yards |

=== vs Texas A&M ===
Texas A&M Aggies (4–6) at No. 22 Oklahoma Sooners (6–4) – Game summary

| Quarter | 1 | 2 | 3 | 4 | Total |
|---|---|---|---|---|---|
| Aggies | 0 | 7 | 0 | 0 | 7 |
| No. 22 Sooners | 0 | 7 | 0 | 21 | 28 |

at Gaylord Family Oklahoma Memorial Stadium • Norman, Oklahoma

- Date: November 21
- Game time: 2:45 p.m.
- Game weather: Sunny
- Game attendance: 83,487
- Referee: David Smith
- TV announcers (ESPN2): Lowell Galindo (play-by-play), Kirk Morrison (analyst), Dawn Davenport (sideline)

Game information

First Quarter

- No Score

Second Quarter

- (12:00) TAM ― Isaiah Horton 36 yard pass from Brady Hart, David Olano kick (Drive: 6 plays, 96 yards, 3:05; TAM 7―0)
- (0:22) OU ― Rocky Beers 4 yard pass from John Mateer, Tate Sandell kick (Drive: 8 plays, 92 yards, 1:22; Tied 7―7)

Third Quarter

- No Score

Fourth Quarter

- (13:13) OU ― Tory Blaylock 5 yard pass from John Mateer, Tate Sandell kick (Drive: 15 plays, 96 yards, 8:24; OU 14―7)
- (3:50) OU ― Isaiah Satenga III 25 yard pass from John Mateer, Tate Sandell kick (Drive: 1 play, 25 yards, 0:07; OU 21―7)
- (0:22) OU ― John Mateer 7 yard rush, Tate Sandell kick (Drive: 7 plays, 26 yards, 2:48; OU 28―7)

| Statistics | TAMU | OU |
|---|---|---|
| First downs | 10 | 24 |
| Plays–yards | 52−185 | 71−421 |
| Rushes–yards | 32−54 | 37−152 |
| Passing yards | 131 | 269 |
| Passing: comp–att–int | 8―20―1 | 23―34―1 |
| Time of possession | 25:57 | 34:03 |

| Team | Category | Player | Statistics |
|---|---|---|---|
| Texas A&M | Passing | Brady Hart | 8/20, 131 yards, TD, INT |
| Texas A&M | Rushing | KJ Edwards | 16 carries, 49 yards |
| Texas A&M | Receiving | Mario Carver | 4 receptions, 78 yards |
| Oklahoma | Passing | John Mateer | 23/34, 269 yards, 3 TD, INT |
| Oklahoma | Rushing | John Mateer | 14 carries, 66 yards, TD |
| Oklahoma | Receiving | Rocky Beers | 7 receptions, 69 yards, TD |

=== at Missouri (rivalry) ===
Oklahoma Sooners (7–4) at Missouri Tigers (7–4) – Game summary

| Quarter | 1 | 2 | Total |
|---|---|---|---|
| Sooners | | | 0 |
| Tigers | | | 0 |

at Faurot Field • Columbia, Missouri

- Date: November 28
- Game time: 3:15 PM
- TV: SECN

| Statistics | OU | MIZ |
|---|---|---|
| First downs | | |
| Plays–yards | | |
| Rushes–yards | | |
| Passing yards | | |
| Passing: comp–att–int | | |
| Time of possession | | |

| Team | Category | Player | Statistics |
|---|---|---|---|
| Oklahoma | Passing | | |
| Oklahoma | Rushing | | |
| Oklahoma | Receiving | | |
| Missouri | Passing | | |
| Missouri | Rushing | | |
| Missouri | Receiving | | |

== Personnel ==
=== Coaching staff ===
| Name | Position | Consecutive years |
|---|---|---|
| Brent Venables | Head coach | 5th |
| Jason Witten | Interim Offensive Coordinator/Tight Ends | 1st |
| Todd Bates | Associate head coach/Defensive coordinator/Run defense/Defensive tackles | 5th |
| Bill Bedenbaugh | Offensive line | 14th |
| Miguel Chavis | Defensive ends | 5th |
| Doug Deakin | Special Team Coordinator | 2nd |
| Nate Dreiling | Inside Linebackers Coach | 2nd |
| Wes Goodwin | Assistant Linebackers/Outside Linebackers | 2nd |
| Brandon Hall | Safeties | 5th |
| Emmett Jones | Passing game coordinator/Wide receivers | 4th |
| John Kuceyeski | Quarterbacks coach | 1st |
| Deland McCullough | Running backs | 1st |
| LaMar Morgan | Cornerbacks | 1st |
| James Dobson | Director of sports enhancement & strength and conditioning | 1st |
Source: 2025 Oklahoma Sooners Roster

=== Roster ===
2026 Oklahoma Sooners football
| Quarterback: 8 Bowe Bentley – freshman (6'1, 208); 10 John Mateer – (redshirt) senior (6'1, 224); 15 Jett Niu – (redshirt) freshman (6'2, 205); 16 Whitt Newbauer – (redshirt) sophomore (6'6, 237); Running back: 6 Tory Blaylock – sophomore (5'11, 212); 9 Lloyd Avant – junior (5'10, 212); 20 Jonathan Hatton Jr. – freshman (6'1, 235); 21 Xavier Robinson – junior (6'0, 235); 23 Ben McCreary – (redshirt) senior (5'9, 215); 25 Andy Bass – (redshirt) sophomore(5'11, 210); 28 DeZephen Walker – freshman (5'10, 215); 29 Gabę Sawchuk – (redshirt) sophomore (5'10, 202); Wide receiver: 0 Manny Choice – sophomore (6'4, 210); 1 Isaiah Sategna III – (redshirt) senior (5'10, 185); 2 Jaheisear Rogers – freshman (5'11, 182); 3 Parker Livingstone – (redshirt) sophomore (6'3, 200); 4 Daniel Odom – freshman (6'2, 195); 5 Jer'Michael Carter – senior (6'4, 212); 7 Jacob Jordan – junior (5'9, 185); 11 Trell Harris – (redshirt) senior (6'0, 200); 13 Jayden Petit – freshman (6'4, 218); 14 Elijah Thomas – sophomore (6'1, 200); 17 Mackenzie Alleyne – (redshirt) sophomore (5'11, 184); 80 Eli Merck – (redshirt) junior (5'11, 203); 82 Ivan Carreon – junior (6'6, 238); 84 Xavier Okwufulueze – freshman (6'5, 217); 85 Trey Brown – (redshirt) junior (5'9, 178); Tight end: 12 Ryder Mix – freshman (6'3, 238); 18 Tyler Ruxer – freshman (6'4, 235); 19 Kade McIntyre – (redshirt) junior (6'3, 225); 22 Trynae Washington – (redshirt) freshman (6'3, 265); 44 John Locke Jr. – (redshirt) senior (6'4, 250); 81 Rocky Beers – (redshirt) senior (6'5, 240); 88 Jack Van Dorselaer – sophomore (6'4, 250); 89 Hayden Hansen (redshirt) senior (6'8, 270); Long snapper: 49 Ben Anderson – (redshirt) senior (6'5, 249); 50 Seth Freeman – (redshirt) freshman (6'0, 238) | Offensive line: 52 Noah Best – — freshman (6'4, 318); 55 Eddy Pierre–Louis – – (redshirt) sophomore (6'3, 319); 56 Michael Fasusi – – sophomore (6'5, 320); 57 Gunnar Allen – – (redshirt) senior (6'1, 295); 60 Caleb Nitta – — (redshirt) junior (6'2, 305); 61 Kenneth Wermy – — (redshirt) junior (6'4, 312); 64 Sean Hutton – – (redshirt) freshman (6'0, 305); 65 Ace Hodges – — (redshirt) sophomore (6'1, 305); 68 Owen Hollenbeck – – (redshirt) freshman (6'3, 340); 69 Jake Maikkula – — (redshirt) senior (6'5, 305); 70 Ryan Fodje – – sophomore (6'5, 327); 71 Peyton Joseph – — sophomore (6'4, 330); 72 Fred Hinton – — junior (6'4, 315); 73 Deacon Schmitt – — freshman (6'5, 314); 74 Draius Afalava – – f (redshirt) freshman (6'4, 365); 75 Daniel Akikunmi – – (redshirt) sophomore (6'6, 325); 76 E'Marion Harris – — (redshirt) senior (6'6, 318); 77 Heath Ozaeta – – (redshirt) junior (6'5, 315); Defensive line: 0 David Stone – DT – junior (6'3, 312); 6 Nigel Smith II – DE – (redshirt) sophomore (6'4, 295); 8 Bishop Thomas – DL – (redshirt) senior (6'1, 300); 16 Danny Okoye – DE – (redshirt) sophomore (6'3, 260); 19 Brian Harris – DL – freshman (6'3, 280); 34 Adepoju Adebawore – DE – senior (6'4, 265); 40 Matthew Nelson – DL — freshman (6'5, 247); 42 Wyatt Gilmore – DE – (redshirt) sophomore (6'4, 258); 44 Taylor Wein – DE – (redshirt) junior (6'4, 270); 58 James Carrington – DL — freshman (6'2, 290); 65 Jayden Jackson – DT – junior (6'2, 310); 80 Bergin Kysar – DL – (redshirt) sophomore (6'3, 255); 88 CJ Nickson – DL – (redshirt) freshman (6'4, 272); 90 Trent Wilson – DL – (redshirt) freshman (6'3, 305); 92 Jacob Henry – DL – (redshirt) sophomore (6'0, 280); 93 Kenny Ozowalu –DL — (redshirt) sophomore (6'3, 283); 97 Alex Shieldnight – DL – (redshirt) freshman (6'2, 255); 98 Jake Kreul – DL — freshman (6'3, 240) | Linebacker: 7 Taylor Heim – (redshirt) junior (6'5, 225); 10 Kip Lewis – (redshirt) senior (6'1, 226); 11 Kristan Moore – freshman (6'1, 229); 15 Beau Jandreau – freshman (6'0, 210); 17 Jacob Curry – freshman (6'0, 214); 18 Cole Sullivan – junior (6'4, 230); 26 Elgee Webster – (redshirt) freshman (5'11, 215); 28 Marcus James – (redshirt) freshman (6'3, 225); 30 Dane Bathurst – freshman (6'4, 233); 38 Owen Heinecke – (redshirt) senior (6'1, 226); 41 Barrett Travis – (redshirt) freshman (6'0, 215); 47 James Nesta – (redshirt) sophomore (6'3, 233); Defensive back: 2 Omarion Robinson – DB – sophomore (5'11, 210); 3 Reggie Powers III – DB – junior (6'0, 212); 4 Courtland Guillory – DB – sophomore (6'0, 188); 5 Markel Ford – DB — freshman (6'1, 205); 9 Dakoda Fields - DB - (redshirt) sophomore (6'1, 205); 12 Derrick Johnson – DB – freshman (6'0, 185); 13 Niko Jandreau – DB – freshman (6'0, 195); 14 Tristan Hayes – DB – (redshirt) freshman (6'2, 185); 20 Casen Calmus – DB – (redshirt) junior (5'10, 205); 21 Jeremiah Newcombe – DB – (redshirt) sophomore (5'9, 198); 22 Peyton Bowen – DB – senior (6'0, 200); 23 Eli Bowen – DB – junior (5'9, 185); 24 Jacobe Johnson – DB – senior (6'2, 210); 25 Michael Boganowski – DB – junior (6'2, 212); 27 Preston Mickens – DB – (redshirt) sophomore (5'10, 195); 31 Reed DeQuasie – DB — (redshirt) junior (6'1, 205); 33 Lebron Bauer – DB — freshman (6'0, 188); 37 Prince Ijioma – DB – junior (6'2, 199); Placekicker: 27 Trace Rudd – freshman (5'11, 195); 29 Tate Sandell – (redshirt) senior (5'9, 178); 33 Preston Tarpley – (redshirt) freshman (6'0, 190); 35 Liam Evans – (redshirt) sophomore (5'7, 177); 43 Grayson Miller – (redshirt) senior (5'9, 193); Punter: 87 Jacob Ulrich – (redshirt) junior (6'5, 208) |

=== Departures ===
==== Outgoing transfers ====
| Player | Position | Height | Weight | Year | New team |
|---|---|---|---|---|---|
| Jayden Gibson | WR | 6'5 | 190 | Redshirt junior | South Carolina |
| Kendel Dolby | CB | 5'11 | 180 | Senior | Mississippi State |
| Kobie McKinzie | LB | 6'2 | 245 | Redshirt junior | Northwestern |
| Isaiah Autry-Dent | OT | 6'6 | 300 | Redshirt freshmen | Mississippi State |
| Kaden Helms | TE | 6'4.5 | 220 | Redshirt junior | Minnesota |
| Jacob Sexton | IOL | 6'6 | 294 | Senior | Oklahoma State |
| Jovantae Barnes | RB | 5'11.5 | 185 | Senior | Kentucky |
| Marcus Wimberly | S | 6'0 | 200 | Freshmen | |
| Troy Everett | IOL | 6'3 | 280 | Redshirt senior | Ole Miss |
| Luke Baklenko | OT | 6'7 | 280 | Junior | |
| Devon Jordan | CB | 5'10.5 | 170 | Sophomore | Baylor |
| Michael Hawkins Jr. | QB | 6'1 | 185 | Sophomore | West Virginia |
| Maliek Hawkins | CB | 6'1 | 175 | Freshman | West Virginia |
| Gentry Williams | S | 5'11 | 164 | Redshirt junior | Georgia |
| Logan Howland | OT | 6'6 | 280 | Redshirt sophomore | Virginia Tech |
| KJ Daniels | WR | 5'10 | 153 | Redshirt freshman | |
| Carson Kent | TE | 6'4 | 240 | Redshirt junior | Pittsburgh |
| Taylor Tatum | RB | 5'10.5 | 200 | Sophomore | Michigan |
| Jake Taylor | IOL | 6'5.5 | 283 | Redshirt junior | Iowa State |
| Javonnie Gibson | WR | 6'2 | 205 | Redshirt junior | Cincinnati |
| Zion Kearney | WR | 6'2 | 195 | Sophomore | Wisconsin |
| Samuel Omosigho | LB | 6'1 | 215 | Junior | UCLA |
| Jayden Hardy | S | 5'10.5 | 165 | Sophomore | Colorado |
| Zion Ragins | WR | 5'7 | 150 | Sophomore | Mississippi State |
| Markus Strong | DL | 6'5 | 270 | Redshirt sophomore | Clemson |
| Ricky Lolohea | DL | 6'4 | 250 | Redshirt sophomore | |
| Luke Baklenko | OT | 6'7 | 280 | Junior | Arizona State |

=== Additions ===
==== Incoming transfers ====
| Player | Position | Height | Weight | Year | Former team |
|---|---|---|---|---|---|
| Hayden Hansen | TE | 6'6 | 250 | Redshirt junior | Florida |
| Caleb Nitta | IOL | 6'2 | 295 | Redshirt sophomore | Western Kentucky |
| Trell Harris | WR | 6'1 | 185 | Senior | Virginia |
| E'Marion Harris | OT | 6'7 | 379 | Redshirt Junior | Arkansas |
| Lloyd Avant | RB | 5'9.5 | 190 | Sophomore | Colorado State |
| Rocky Beers | TE | 6'5 | 234 | Senior | Colorado State |
| Dakoda Fields | CB | 6'1.5 | 180 | Sophomore | Oregon |
| Parker Livingstone | WR | 6'3 | 190 | Redshirt freshman | Texas |
| Kenny Ozowalu | EDGE | 6'4 | 270 | Redshirt freshman | UTSA |
| Cole Sullivan | LB | 6'3 | 230 | Sophomore | Michigan |
| Peyton Joseph | IOL | 6'3 | 280 | Freshman | Georgia Tech |
| Mackenzie Alleyne | WR | 6'1 | 185 | Redshirt freshman | Washington |
| Bishop Thomas | DL | 6'2 | 285 | Redshirt junior | Georgia State |
| Jack Van Dorselaer | TE | 6'5 | 230 | Freshman | Tennessee |
| Prince Ijioma | CB | 6'3 | 190 | Sophomore | Mississippi Valley State |
| Mackenzie Alleyne | WR | 6'1 | 185 | Redshirt freshman | Washington State |

=== Recruiting ===
College recruiting
| Name | Hometown | School | Height | Weight | Commit date |
|---|---|---|---|---|---|
| Ryder Mix; TE | Frisco, TX | Lone Star High School | 6 ft 4 in (1.93 m) | 220 lb (100 kg) | Jun 15, 2024 |
| Ryder Mix; TE | Recruit ratings: Rivals: 247Sports: ESPN: (77) | | | | |
| Daniel Odom; WR | Bellflower, CA | St. John Bosco High School | 6 ft 2 in (1.88 m) | 175 lb (79 kg) | Jan 28, 2025 |
| Daniel Odom; WR | Recruit ratings: Rivals: 247Sports: ESPN: (81) | | | | |
| Niko Jandreau; S | Chandler, AZ | Hamilton High School | 5 ft 11 in (1.80 m) | 200 lb (91 kg) | May 13, 2025 |
| Niko Jandreau; S | Recruit ratings: Rivals: 247Sports: ESPN: (78) | | | | |
| Brian Harris; DL | Jacksonville, FL | Creekside High School | 6 ft 2.5 in (1.89 m) | 280 lb (130 kg) | May 23, 2025 |
| Brian Harris; DL | Recruit ratings: Rivals: 247Sports: ESPN: (79) | | | | |
| Matthew Nelson; EDGE | Bryant, AR | Bryant High School | 6 ft 5 in (1.96 m) | 215 lb (98 kg) | Jun 8, 2025 |
| Matthew Nelson; EDGE | Recruit ratings: Rivals: 247Sports: ESPN: (78) | | | | |
| Noah Best; IOL | Midlothian, TX | Midlothian High School | 6 ft 4 in (1.93 m) | 220 lb (100 kg) | Jun 8, 2025 |
| Noah Best; IOL | Recruit ratings: Rivals: 247Sports: ESPN: (78) | | | | |
| Derrick Johnson; CB | Murrieta, CA | Murrieta Valley High School | 6 ft 2 in (1.88 m) | 170 lb (77 kg) | Jun 10, 2025 |
| Derrick Johnson; CB | Recruit ratings: Rivals: 247Sports: ESPN: (78) | | | | |
| DeZephen Walker; RB | Raymore, MO | Raymore-Pecuilar High School | 5 ft 10 in (1.78 m) | 180 lb (82 kg) | Jun 16, 2025 |
| DeZephen Walker; RB | Recruit ratings: Rivals: 247Sports: ESPN: (80) | | | | |
| Bowe Bentley; QB | Celina, TX | Celina High School | 6 ft 1 in (1.85 m) | 200 lb (91 kg) | Jun 20, 2025 |
| Bowe Bentley; QB | Recruit ratings: Rivals: 247Sports: ESPN: (83) | | | | |
| Trace Rudd; K | Overland Park, KS | Blue Valley Northwest High School | 6 ft 0 in (1.83 m) | 185 lb (84 kg) | Jun 21, 2025 |
| Trace Rudd; K | Recruit ratings: Rivals: 247Sports: ESPN: (74) | | | | |
| Beau Jandreau; LB | Chandler, AZ | Hamilton High School | 6 ft 1 in (1.85 m) | 215 lb (98 kg) | Jun 23, 2025 |
| Beau Jandreau; LB | Recruit ratings: Rivals: 247Sports: ESPN: (77) | | | | |
| Daniel Norman; EDGE | Fort Lauderdale, FL | St. Thomas Aquinas High School | 6 ft 4 in (1.93 m) | 220 lb (100 kg) | Jun 23, 2025 |
| Daniel Norman; EDGE | Recruit ratings: Rivals: 247Sports: ESPN: (77) | | | | |
| Deacon Schmitt; IOL | Windsor, CO | Windsor High School | 6 ft 5 in (1.96 m) | 310 lb (140 kg) | Jun 28, 2025 |
| Deacon Schmitt; IOL | Recruit ratings: Rivals: 247Sports: ESPN: (80) | | | | |
| Tyler Ruxer; TE | Lincoln City, IN | Heritage Hills High School | 6 ft 4 in (1.93 m) | 220 lb (100 kg) | Jul 7, 2025 |
| Tyler Ruxer; TE | Recruit ratings: Rivals: 247Sports: ESPN: (78) | | | | |
| Jake Kruel; EDGE | Orlando, FL | IMG Academy | 6 ft 2 in (1.88 m) | 223 lb (101 kg) | Aug 12, 2025 |
| Jake Kruel; EDGE | Recruit ratings: Rivals: 247Sports: ESPN: (90) | | | | |
| James Carrington; DL | Irvine, CA | Crean Lutheran High School | 6 ft 2 in (1.88 m) | 240 lb (110 kg) | Aug 16, 2025 |
| James Carrington; DL | Recruit ratings: Rivals: 247Sports: ESPN: (79) | | | | |
| Zizi Okwufulueze; WR | Owasso, OK | Rejoice Christian High School | 6 ft 4 in (1.93 m) | 198 lb (90 kg) | Sep 2, 2025 |
| Zizi Okwufulueze; WR | Recruit ratings: Rivals: 247Sports: ESPN: (78) | | | | |
| Jacob Curry; LB | Ponte Vedra Beach, FL | Nease High School | 6 ft 1 in (1.85 m) | 200 lb (91 kg) | Oct 10, 2025 |
| Jacob Curry; LB | Recruit ratings: Rivals: 247Sports: ESPN: (80) | | | | |
| Jahsiear Rogers; WR | Bear, DE | Appoquinimink High School | 5 ft 10.5 in (1.79 m) | 175 lb (79 kg) | Oct 27, 2025 |
| Jahsiear Rogers; WR | Recruit ratings: Rivals: 247Sports: ESPN: (78) | | | | |
| Jonathan Hatton Jr. RB | Cibolo, TX | Steele High School | 6 ft 0 in (1.83 m) | 215 lb (98 kg) | Nov 24, 2025 |
| Jonathan Hatton Jr. RB | Recruit ratings: Rivals: 247Sports: ESPN: (83) | | | | |
| Markel Ford; S | Mesquite, TX | Horn High School | 6 ft 0.5 in (1.84 m) | 190 lb (86 kg) | Nov 26, 2025 |
| Markel Ford; S | Recruit ratings: Rivals: 247Sports: ESPN: (78) | | | | |
| Jayden Petit; WR | Naples, FL | St. John Neumann High School | 6 ft 4 in (1.93 m) | 196 lb (89 kg) | Nov 27, 2025 |
| Jayden Petit; WR | Recruit ratings: Rivals: 247Sports: ESPN: (82) | | | | |
| Dane Bathurst; EDGE | Carmel, IN | Carmel High School | 6 ft 4 in (1.93 m) | 220 lb (100 kg) | Nov 28, 2025 |
| Dane Bathurst; EDGE | Recruit ratings: Rivals: 247Sports: ESPN: (80) | | | | |
| Kristan Moore; LB | Selma, AL | Selma High School | 6 ft 2 in (1.88 m) | 220 lb (100 kg) | Dec 1, 2025 |
| Kristan Moore; LB | Recruit ratings: Rivals: 247Sports: ESPN: (76) | | | | |
Overall recruit ranking: Rivals: #17 247Sports: #15 ESPN: #16
Note: In many cases, Scout, Rivals, 247Sports, On3, and ESPN may conflict in their listings of height and weight.; In these cases, the average was taken. ESPN grades are on a 100-point scale.; Sources: "Rivals commits". Rivals.; "ESPN commits". ESPN.; "2026 Team Ranking". Rivals.com.; "247Sports commits". 247Sports.
