= 2026 UTEP Miners football team =

American college football season

2026 UTEP Miners football
- Conference: Mountain West Conference
- Record: 1–10 (0–7 MW)
- Head coach: Scotty Walden (3rd season; first 10 games); Kyle Beyer (interim; final 2 games)
- Offensive coordinator: Lanear Sampson (1st season)
- Co-offensive coordinator: Joe Pappalardo (1st season)
- Offensive scheme: Spread
- Defensive coordinator: Kyle Beyer (1st season)
- Co-defensive coordinator: Kelvin Sigler (3rd season)
- Base defense: 4–2–5
- Home stadium: Sun Bowl

2026 Mountain West Conference football standings
	Conf.			Overall
Team	W		L	W		L
New Mexico	6	–	1	9	–	2
Wyoming	6	–	2	7	–	4
North Dakota State	5	–	2	8	–	2
Air Force	5	–	2	9	–	2
UNLV	4	–	2	6	–	4
Nevada	3	–	3	4	–	6
San Jose State	3	–	4	5	–	6
Hawaii	2	–	5	3	–	7
Northern Illinois	0	–	6	0	–	10
UTEP	0	–	7	1	–	10
Championship: December 4, 2026
As of November 21, 2026; Rankings from CFP rankings

The 2026 UTEP Miners football team represents the University of Texas at El Paso (UTEP) as a member of the Mountain West Conference during the 2026 NCAA Division I FBS football season. The team plays home games at the Sun Bowl in El Paso. This is the Miners' first season in the Mountain West.

The team was led by third-year head coach Scotty Walden for the first ten games before his firing on November 16. UTEP averaged 13,183 fans per home game.

== Schedule ==
Date	Time	Opponent	Site	TV	Result	Attendance
September 4	6:00 p.m.	at No. 10 Oklahoma*	Gaylord Family Oklahoma Memorial Stadium; Norman, OK	SECN+	L 0–51	84,315
September 12	7:00 p.m.	Texas Southern*	Sun Bowl; El Paso, TX	MW+	W 51–10	24,580
September 19	1:30 p.m.	at No. 19 Michigan*	Michigan Stadium; Ann Arbor, MI	BTN	L 17–52	110,668
September 26	7:00 p.m.	Oregon State*	Sun Bowl; El Paso, TX	MW+	L 7–33	15,099
October 3	2:00 p.m.	at New Mexico	University Stadium; Albuquerque, NM	MW+	L 7–61	28,256
October 10	5:00 p.m.	Nevada	Sun Bowl; El Paso, TX	FS1	L 13–30	13,927
October 17	7:00 p.m.	San Jose State	Sun Bowl; El Paso, TX	MW+	L 11–24	8,576
October 31	1:30 p.m.	at North Dakota State	Fargodome; Fargo, ND	MW+	L 7–31	15,513
November 7	7:30 p.m.	Hawaii	Sun Bowl; El Paso, TX	FS1	L 14–17	8,581
November 14	8:00 p.m.	Wyoming	Sun Bowl; El Paso, TX	FS1	L 15–27	8,334
November 20	6:00 p.m.	at Air Force	Falcon Stadium; Colorado Springs, CO	The CW	L 3–52	16,180
November 28	1:30 p.m.	at Northern Illinois	Huskie Stadium; DeKalb, IL	MW+	–	
*Non-conference game; Rankings from AP Poll (and CFP Rankings, after November 4) - Released prior to game; All times are in Mountain time

== Offseason ==
On January 22, 2026, Austin Furgatch was hired to be the new general manager of the Miners.

== Game summaries ==
=== at No. 10 Oklahoma ===
UTEP Miners (0–0) at No. 10 Oklahoma Sooners (0–0) – Game summary

Quarter	1	2	3	4	Total
Miners	0	0	0	0	0
No. 10 Sooners	21	6	17	7	51

at Gaylord Family Oklahoma Memorial Stadium • Norman, OK

- Date: September 4, 2026
- Game time: 6:00 PM
- Game weather: Sunny • Temperature: 98 °F (37 °C) • Wind: S at 20 miles per hour (32 km/h)
- Game attendance: 84,315
- Referee: Ted Pitts
- TV announcers (SECN+): Ted Emrich (play-by-play), Fozzy Whittaker (analyst), and Maria Martin (sideline)

Game information

First quarter

- OU – Lloyd Avant 1-yard run (Tate Sandell kick), 9:16. Sooners 7–0. Drive: 12 plays, 76 yards, 5:39.
- OU – Isaiah Sategna III 88-yard punt return (Tate Sandell kick), 7:27. Sooners 14–0.
- OU – Rocky Beers 40-yard pass from John Mateer (Tate Sandell kick), 1:01. Sooners 21–0. Drive: 5 plays, 80 yards, 2:29.

Second quarter

- OU – Tate Sandell 33-yard field goal, 5:00. Sooners 24–0. Drive: 11 plays, 53 yards, 5:51.
- OU – Tate Sandell 32-yard field goal, 1:42. Sooners 27–0. Drive: 5 plays, 15 yards, 1:43.

Third quarter

- OU – Isaiah Sategna III 34-yard pass from John Mateer (Tate Sandell kick), 11:47. Sooners 34–0. Drive: 2 plays, 34 yards, 0:46.
- OU – Trell Harris 48-yard pass from John Mateer (Tate Sandell kick), 8:22. Sooners 41–0. Drive: 3 plays, 57 yards, 1:14.
- OU – Liam Evans 34-yard field goal, 3:15. Sooners 44–0. Drive: 6 plays, 19 yards, 2:49.

First quarter

- OU – Whitt Newbauer 3-yard run (Liam Evans kick), 12:11. Sooners 51–0. Drive: 7 plays, 32 yards, 4:14.

Statistics	UTEP	OU
First downs	10	18
Plays–yards	56–198	58–401
Rushes–yards	38–112	39–170
Passing yards	86	231
Passing: comp–att–int	10–18–0	12–19–0
Turnovers	2	1
Time of possession	29:28	30:32

Team	Category	Player	Statistics
UTEP	Passing	EJ Colson Jr.	6/12, 52 yards
UTEP	Rushing	Raymond Moore III	9 carries, 49 yards
UTEP	Receiving	Tavorus Jones	3 receptions, 22 yards
Oklahoma	Passing	John Mateer	11/17, 225 yards, 3 TD
Oklahoma	Rushing	Lloyd Avant	15 carries, 79 yards, TD
Oklahoma	Receiving	Isaiah Sategna III	4 receptions, 76 yards, TD

=== Texas Southern (FCS) ===
Texas Southern Tigers (FCS) (1–1) at UTEP Miners (0–1) – Game summary

Quarter	1	2	3	4	Total
Tigers (FCS)	7	3	0	0	10
Miners	7	14	21	9	51

at Sun Bowl • El Paso, TX

- Date: September 12, 2026
- Game time: 7:00 PM
- Game weather: Sunny • Temperature: 93 °F (34 °C)
- Game attendance: 24,580
- Referee: Brad Frisby
- TV announcers (MW+): Andy Morgan (play-by-play) and Cole Freytag (analyst)

Game information

First quarter

- UTEP – Kam Thomas 83-yard pass from EJ Colson Jr. (Carlos Arreola kick), 12:32. Miners 7–0. Drive: 1 play, 83 yards, 0:11.
- TXSO – Athean Renfro Jr. 16-yard run (Miguel Arana III kick), 4:55. Tied 7–7. Drive: 12 plays, 75 yards, 7:37.

Second quarter

- TXSO – Miguel Arana III 43-yard field goal, 12:05. Tigers 10–7. Drive: 11 plays, 44 yards, 6:34.
- UTEP – EJ Colson Jr. 3-yard run (Carlos Arreola kick), 5:09. Miners 14–10. Drive: 6 plays, 37 yards, 2:48.
- UTEP – Cash Cheeks 13-yard pass from EJ Colson Jr. (Carlos Arreola kick), 0:37. Miners 21–10. Drive: 7 plays, 38 yards, 1:28.

Third quarter

- UTEP – Cash Cheeks 0-yard fumble recovery (Carlos Arreola kick), 12:04. Miners 28–10. Drive: 8 plays, 75 yards, 2:56.
- UTEP – Carver Cheeks 13-yard pass from EJ Colson Jr. (Carlos Arreola kick), 10:19. Miners 35–10. Drive: 1 play, 13 yards, 0:07.
- UTEP – Tavorus Jones 33-yard run (Carlos Arreola kick), 6:28. Miners 42–10. Drive: 5 plays, 51 yards, 1:58.

Fourth quarter

- UTEP – Carlos Arreola 35-yard field goal, 9:40. Miners 45–10. Drive: 11 plays, 66 yards, 5:49.
- UTEP – Raymond Moore III 79-yard run (Carlos Arreola kick failed), 0:48. Miners 51–10. Drive: 2 plays, 80 yards, 0:52.

Statistics	TXSO	UTEP
First downs	13	21
Plays–yards	62–211	54–491
Rushes–yards	40–112	33–252
Passing yards	99	239
Passing: comp–att–int	13–22–1	14–21–0
Turnovers	2	1
Time of possession	36:36	23:24

Team	Category	Player	Statistics
Texas Southern	Passing	Cam'Ron McCoy	11/17, 85 yards, INT
Texas Southern	Rushing	Athean Renfro Jr.	13 carries, 45 yards, TD
Texas Southern	Receiving	Xavier Phipps	3 receptions, 31 yards
UTEP	Passing	EJ Colson Jr.	14/21, 239 yards, 4 TD
UTEP	Rushing	Tavorus Jones	16 carries, 104 yards, TD
UTEP	Receiving	Kam Thomas	2 receptions, 92 yards, TD

=== at No. 19 Michigan ===
UTEP Miners (1–1) at No. 19 Michigan Wolverines (2–0) – Game summary

Quarter	1	2	3	4	Total
Miners	7	7	0	3	17
No. 19 Wolverines	0	17	28	7	52

at Michigan Stadium • Ann Arbor, Michigan

- Date: September 19, 2026
- Game time: 1:30 PM
- Game weather: 60 °F (16 °C), rain, SE 8 miles per hour (13 km/h)
- Game attendance: 110,668
- Referee: Matthew Richards
- TV announcers (BTN): Jeff Levering (play-by-play), Jake Butt (analyst), and Brooke Fletcher (sideline)

Game information

First quarter

- (6:51) UTEP ― Carver Cheeks 45-yard pass from EJ Colson, Carlos Arreola kick (Drive: 5 plays, 73 yards, 3:14; UTEP 7–0)

Second quarter

- (10:34) MICH ― Savion Hiter 6-yard run, Trey Butkowski kick (Drive: 12 plays, 68 yards, 5:48; Tied 7–7)
- (5:58) UTEP ― Lamar Sperling 18-yard pass from EJ Colson, Carlos Arreola kick (Drive: 1 play, 18 yards, 0:07; UTEP 14–7)
- (1:31) MICH ― JJ Buchanan 21-yard pass from Bryce Underwood, Trey Butkowski kick (Drive: 10 plays, 75 yards, 4:27; Tied 14–14)
- (0:00) MICH ― Trey Butkowski 49-yard field goal (Drive: 5 plays, 18 yards, 0:29; Michigan 17–14)

Third quarter

- (10:03) MICH ― Jordan Marshall 6-yard run, Trey Butkowski kick (Drive: 6 plays, 52 yards, 2:41; Michigan 24–14)
- (5:25) MICH ― Savion Hiter 8-yard run, Trey Butkowski kick (Drive: 8 plays, 46 yards, 3:19; Michigan 31–14)
- (1:18) MICH ― Andrew Marsh 34-yard pass from Bryce Underwood, Trey Butkowski kick (Drive: 5 plays, 62 yards, 1:33; Michigan 38–14)
- (0:00) MICH ― Jonah Lea'ea 9-yard interception, Trey Butkowski kick (Michigan 45–14)

Fourth quarter

- (8:11) UTEP ― Carlos Arreola 39-yard field goal (Drive: 12 plays, 36 yards, 6:41; Michigan 45–17)
- (3:44) MICH ― Salesi Moa 19-yard pass from Tommy Carr, Trey Butkowski kick (Drive: 8 plays, 51 yards, 4:26; Michigan 52–17)

Statistics	UTEP	MICH
First downs	9	27
Plays–yards	43–150	71–431
Rushes–yards	32–57	42–185
Passing yards	93	246
Passing: comp–att–int	10–15–1	21–28–0
Time of possession	28:22	31:38

Team	Category	Player	Statistics
UTEP	Passing	EJ Colson	7/9, 86 yards, 2 TD, INT
UTEP	Rushing	Tavorus Jones	9 carries, 34 yards
UTEP	Receiving	Carver Cheeks	1 reception, 45 yards, TD
Michigan	Passing	Bryce Underwood	19/25, 223 yards, 2 TD
Michigan	Rushing	Savion Hiter	11 carries, 62 yards, 2 TD
Michigan	Receiving	Andrew Marsh	10 receptions, 105 yards, TD

=== Oregon State ===
Oregon State Beavers (1–2) at UTEP Miners (1–2) – Game summary

Quarter	1	2	3	4	Total
Beavers	17	3	7	6	33
Miners	0	0	7	0	7

at Sun Bowl • El Paso, TX

- Date: September 26, 2026
- Game time: 7:00 PM
- Game weather: Sunny • Temperature: 85 °F (29 °C) • Wind: W at 3 miles per hour (4.8 km/h)
- Game attendance: 15,099
- Referee: John Love
- TV announcers (MW+): Andy Morgan and Cole Freytag

Game information

First quarter

- ORST - AJ Newberry 12-yard run (Caleb Ojeda kick), 12:23. Beavers 7-0. Drive: 7 plays, 75 yards, 2:37.
- ORST - Caleb Ojeda 37-yard field goal, 7:22. Beavers 10-0. Drive: 7 plays, 40 yards, 2:21.
- ORST - Jesse Legree 14-yard pass from Braden Atkinson (Caleb Ojeda kick), 1:50. Beavers 17-0. Drive: 7 plays, 75 yards, 3:54.

Second quarter

- ORST - Caleb Ojeda 35-yard field goal, 2:20. Beavers 20-0. Drive: 8 plays, 65 yards, 3:37.

Third quarter

- UTEP - Carver Cheeks 6-yard pass from EJ Colson Jr. (Carlos Arreola kick), 10:08. Beavers 20-7. Drive: 9 plays, 75 yards, 4:52.
- ORST - Jesse Legree 19-yard pass from Braden Atkinson (Caleb Ojeda kick), 6:16. Beavers 27-7. Drive: 8 plays, 75 yards, 3:52.

Fourth quarter

- ORST - Jameson Powell 18-yard pass from Braeden Atkinson (Two-point pass conversion failed), 14:56. Beavers 33-7. Drive: 6 plays, 74 yards, 2:14.

Statistics	ORST	UTEP
First downs	25	18
Plays–yards	57–451	66–222
Rushes–yards	23–150	41–92
Passing yards	301	130
Passing: comp–att–int	24–34–1	18–25–1
Turnovers	1	1
Time of possession	25:37	34:23

Team	Category	Player	Statistics
Oregon State	Passing	Braden Atkinson	24/34, 301 yards, 3 TD, INT
Oregon State	Rushing	AJ Newberry	11 carries, 111 yards, TD
Oregon State	Receiving	Jesse Legree	6 receptions, 109 yards, 2 TD
UTEP	Passing	EJ Colson Jr.	16/23, 119 yards, TD, INT
UTEP	Rushing	Tavorus Jones	10 carries, 34 yards
UTEP	Receiving	Jaden Smith	8 receptions, 62 yards

=== at New Mexico ===
UTEP Miners (1–3) at New Mexico Lobos (3–1) – Game summary

Quarter	1	2	3	4	Total
Miners	0	0	0	7	7
Lobos	14	7	16	24	61

at University Stadium • Albuquerque, NM

- Date: October 3, 2026
- Game time: 2:00 PM
- Game weather: Sunny, 71 °F (22 °C), NW winds 4 miles per hour (6.4 km/h)
- Game attendance: 28,256
- Referee: Patrick Foy
- TV announcers (MW+): Robert Portnoy and DonTrell Moore

Game information

First quarter

- UNM – James Laubstein 14-yard run (Grant Glasgow kick), 7:00. New Mexico 7–0. Drive: 6 plays, 49 yards, 3:13.
- UNM – Cade Keith 12-yard pass from Toa Fa'avae (Grant Glasgow kick), 0:00. New Mexico 14–0. Drive: 10 plays, 82 yards, 4:46.

Second quarter

- UNM – Bailen George 52-yard pass from Toa Fa'avae (Grant Glasgow kick), 8:23. New Mexico 21–0. Drive: 3 plays, 61 yards, 1:21.

Third quarter

- UNM – Austin Brawley 65-yard interception return (Grant Glasgow kick), 13:28. New Mexico 28–0.
- UNM – Safety, 7:12. New Mexico 30–0.
- UNM – Bailen George 10-yard pass from Toa Fa'avae (Grant Glasgow kick), 2:45. New Mexico 37–0. Drive: 8 plays, 70 yards, 4:21.

Fourth quarter

- UNM – Scottre Humphrey 1-yard run (Grant Glasgow kick), 14:34. New Mexico 44–0. Drive: 5 plays, 23 yards, 2:22.
- UTEP – Raymond Moore III 86-yard run (Carlos Arreola kick), 13:11. New Mexico 44–7. Drive: 3 plays, 92 yards, 1:18.
- UNM – Cameron Mathews 54-yard run (Grant Glasgow kick), 11:37. New Mexico 51–7. Drive: 3 plays, 75 yards, 1:34.
- UNM – Grant Glasgow 24-yard field goal, 1:52. New Mexico 54–7. Drive: 14 plays, 65 yards, 7:13.
- UNM – Jake DeVos 53-yard fumble return (Grant Glasgow kick), 0:53. New Mexico 61–7.

Statistics	UTEP	UNM
First downs	11	24
Plays–yards	53–271	65–493
Rushes–yards	35–170	42–231
Passing yards	101	262
Passing: Comp–Att–Int	8–18–3	17–23–1
Turnovers	5	1
Time of possession	28:32	31:28

Team	Category	Player	Statistics
UTEP	Passing	EJ Colson Jr.	6/12, 45 yards, INT
UTEP	Rushing	Raymond Moore III	11 carries, 135 yards, TD
UTEP	Receiving	Kam Thomas	3 receptions, 47 yards
New Mexico	Passing	Toa Fa'avae	15/19, 249 yards, 3 TD, INT
New Mexico	Rushing	Cameron Mathews	6 carries, 108 yards, TD
New Mexico	Receiving	DJ Darling	3 receptions, 75 yards

=== Nevada ===
Nevada Wolf Pack (1–3) at UTEP Miners (1–4) – Game summary

Quarter	1	2	3	4	Total
Wolf Pack	0	0	0	0	0
Miners	0	0	0	0	0

at Sun Bowl • El Paso, TX

- Date: October 10, 2026
- Game time: 5:00 PM
- Game weather: -
- Game attendance: -
- Referee: -
- TV announcers (FS1): Connor Onion and Spencer Tillman

Game information

First quarter
Second quarter
Third quarter
Fourth quarter

Statistics	NEV	UTEP
First downs		
Plays–yards		
Rushes–yards		
Passing yards		
Passing: comp–att–int		
Turnovers		
Time of possession		

Team	Category	Player	Statistics
Nevada	Passing		
Nevada	Rushing		
Nevada	Receiving		
UTEP	Passing		
UTEP	Rushing		
UTEP	Receiving		

=== San Jose State ===
San Jose State Spartans (3–3) at UTEP Miners (1–5) – Game summary

Quarter	1	2	3	4	Total
Spartans	0	0	0	0	0
Miners	0	0	0	0	0

at Sun Bowl • El Paso, TX

- Date: October 17, 2026
- Game time: TBD
- Game weather: -
- Game attendance: -
- Referee: -
- TV announcers (MW+): Andy Morgan and Cole Freytag

Game information

First quarter
Second quarter
Third quarter
Fourth quarter

Statistics	SJSU	UTEP
First downs		
Plays–yards		
Rushes–yards		
Passing yards		
Passing: comp–att–int		
Turnovers		
Time of possession		

Team	Category	Player	Statistics
San Jose State	Passing		
San Jose State	Rushing		
San Jose State	Receiving		
UTEP	Passing		
UTEP	Rushing		
UTEP	Receiving		

=== at North Dakota State ===
UTEP Miners (1–6) at North Dakota State Bison (6–2) – Game summary

Quarter	1	2	3	4	Total
Miners	7	0	0	0	7
Bison	0	10	7	14	31

at Fargodome • Fargo, ND

- Date: October 31, 2026
- Game time: 1:30 PM
- Game weather: Indoors; 70 °F (21 °C)
- Game attendance: 15,513
- Referee: Brad Carrell
- TV announcers (MW+): Dom Izzo (play-by-play), Kyle Emanuel (analyst) and Sam Goetzinger (sideline)

Game information

First quarter

- (12:38) UTEP – Raymond Moore III 57-yard run, Carlos Arreola kick (Drive: 1 play, 57 yards, 0:10; UTEP 7–0)

Second quarter

- (12:03) NDSU – Drew Klein 30-yard field goal (Drive: 16 plays, 83 yards, 8:10; UTEP 7–3)
- (3:47) NDSU – DJ Scott 1-yard run, Drew Klein kick (Drive: 5 plays, 45 yards, 2:32; North Dakota State 10–7)

Third quarter

- (1:16) NDSU – Reis Kessel 3-yard pass from Nathan Hayes, Drew Klein kick (Drive: 10 plays, 80 yards, 5:42; North Dakota State 17–7)

Fourth quarter

- (1:45) NDSU – Nathan Hayes 1-yard run, Drew Klein kick (Drive: 6 plays, 62 yards, 3:36; North Dakota State 24–7)
- (1:06) NDSU – Marion Moore 46-yard fumble recovery, Drew Klein kick (North Dakota State 31–7)

Statistics	UTEP	NDSU
First downs	9	19
Plays–yards	51–238	69–381
Rushes–yards	29–147	37–141
Passing yards	91	240
Passing: Comp–Att–Int	15–22–2	22–32–1
Turnovers	2	1
Time of possession	23:16	36:44

Team	Category	Player	Statistics
UTEP	Passing	EJ Colson Jr.	11/16, 59 yds, 2 INT
UTEP	Rushing	Raymond Moore III	3 carries, 67 yds, TD
UTEP	Receiving	Jaden Smith	6 receptions, 41 yds
North Dakota State	Passing	Nathan Hayes	22/32, 240 yds, TD, INT
North Dakota State	Rushing	DJ Scott	13 carries, 50 yds, TD
North Dakota State	Receiving	Jackson Williams	10 receptions, 111 yds

=== Hawaii ===
Hawaii Rainbow Warriors (2–6) at UTEP Miners (1–7) – Game summary

Quarter	1	2	3	4	Total
Rainbow Warriors	7	3	0	7	17
Miners	0	7	0	7	14

at Sun Bowl • El Paso, TX

- Date: November 7, 2026
- Game time: 7:30 PM
- Game weather: 52 °F (11 °C)
- Game attendance: 8,581
- Referee: Marcus Thornton
- TV announcers (FS1): Carlo Jiménez and Petros Papadakis

Game information

First quarter

- HAW – Titan Lacaden 20-yard pass from Micah Alejado (Sean Olvera-Harle kick), 2:57. Rainbow Warriors 7–0. Drive: 5 plays, 77 yards, 1:54.

Second quarter

- HAW – Sean Olvera-Harle 20-yard field goal, 7:01. Rainbow Warriors 10–0. Drive: 18 plays, 91 yards, 8:11.
- UTEP – Lamar Sperling 5-yard run (Carlos Arreola kick), 6:25. Rainbow Warriors 10–7. Drive: 3 plays, 65 yards, 0:36.

Fourth quarter

- HAW – Sitani Mikaele 6-yard run (Sean Olvera-Harle kick), 10:08. Rainbow Warriors 17–7. Drive: 12 plays, 98 yards, 6:18.
- UTEP – Judah Ezinwa 15-yard pass from Raymond Moore III (Carlos Arreola kick), 6:57. Rainbow Warriors 17–14. Drive: 7 plays, 79 yards, 3:05.

Statistics	HAW	UTEP
First downs	27	17
Plays–yards	78–474	49–288
Rushes–yards	38–121	31–179
Passing yards	303	109
Passing: comp–att–int	26–40–1	9–18–0
Turnovers	2	1
Time of possession	36:35	23:25

Team	Category	Player	Statistics
Hawaii	Passing	Micah Alejado	26/39, 303 yards, TD, INT
Hawaii	Rushing	Cam Barfield	15 carries, 64 yards
Hawaii	Receiving	Titan Lacaden	11 receptions, 109 yards
UTEP	Passing	Raymond Moore III	9/18, 109 yards, TD
UTEP	Rushing	Lamar Sperling	11 carries, 63 yards, TD
UTEP	Receiving	Carver Cheeks	2 receptions, 46 yards

=== Wyoming ===
Wyoming Cowboys (6–3) at UTEP Miners (1–8) – Game summary

Quarter	1	2	3	4	Total
Cowboys	0	0	0	0	0
Miners	0	0	0	0	0

at Sun Bowl • El Paso, TX

- Date: November 14, 2026
- Game time: 8:00 PM
- Game weather: -
- Game attendance: -
- Referee: -
- TV announcers (FS1): Neil Sika and Anthony Herron

Game information

First quarter
Second quarter
Third quarter
Fourth quarter

Statistics	WYO	UTEP
First downs		
Plays–yards		
Rushes–yards		
Passing yards		
Passing: comp–att–int		
Turnovers		
Time of possession		

Team	Category	Player	Statistics
Wyoming	Passing		
Wyoming	Rushing		
Wyoming	Receiving		
UTEP	Passing		
UTEP	Rushing		
UTEP	Receiving		

=== at Air Force ===
UTEP Miners (1–9) at Air Force Falcons (8–2) – Game summary

Quarter	1	2	3	4	Total
Miners	0	0	0	0	0
Falcons	0	0	0	0	0

at Falcon Stadium • Colorado Springs, CO

- Date: November 21, 2026
- Game time: TBD
- Game weather: -
- Game attendance: -
- Referee: -
- TV: -

Game information

First quarter
Second quarter
Third quarter
Fourth quarter

Statistics	UTEP	AFA
First downs		
Plays–yards		
Rushes–yards		
Passing yards		
Passing: Comp–Att–Int		
Turnovers		
Time of possession		

Team	Category	Player	Statistics
UTEP	Passing		
UTEP	Rushing		
UTEP	Receiving		
Air Force	Passing		
Air Force	Rushing		
Air Force	Receiving		

=== at Northern Illinois ===
UTEP Miners (0–0) at Northern Illinois Huskies (0–0) – Game summary

Quarter	1	2	3	4	Total
Miners	0	0	0	0	0
Huskies	0	0	0	0	0

at Huskie Stadium • DeKalb, IL

- Date: November 28, 2026
- Game time: TBD
- Game weather: -
- Game attendance: -
- Referee: -
- TV: -

Game information

First quarter
Second quarter
Third quarter
Fourth quarter

Statistics	UTEP	NIU
First downs		
Plays–yards		
Rushes–yards		
Passing yards		
Passing: Comp–Att–Int		
Turnovers		
Time of possession		

Team	Category	Player	Statistics
UTEP	Passing		
UTEP	Rushing		
UTEP	Receiving		
Northern Illinois	Passing		
Northern Illinois	Rushing		
Northern Illinois	Receiving		

== Personnel ==
=== Transfers ===
==== Outgoing ====
Player	Position	Destination
Ashten Emory	RB	California
Luka Matamoros	OT	Houston Christian
Mark Robinson	OT	Kentucky
Trace Meadows	LB	McNeese
Skyler Locklear	QB	Missouri State
Stratton Shufelt	LB	Missouri State
James Williams	IOL	New Mexico State
Udoka Ezeani	LB	North Texas
Tyrone McDuffie	IOL	Northwestern State
Toric Goins Jr.	WR	Prairie View A&M
Allan McCarter	DL	Prairie View A&M
Alex Szczesniak	TE	Rutgers
Will Weber	DL	Sacramento State
Jake Riggs	IOL	South Dakota
Jake Utley	OT	South Dakota
Kenny Odom	WR	South Florida
Malachi Nelson	QB	Syracuse
Elijah Baldwin	DL	UTSA
Wondame Davis	WR	Wake Forest
Marquez Taylor	RB	West Georgia
Nate Dyman	LB	Unknown
Caden Harris	WR	Unknown
Dennis Lafferty III	OT	Unknown
Ashton Coker	DL	Withdrawn
Justin Content	CB	Withdrawn

==== Incoming ====
Player	Position	Previous school
Lamar Sperling	RB	Buffalo
Jackson Bradley	IOL	Cornell
Kaleb Miles	CB	East Texas A&M
Sterling Miles	EDGE	Eastern Michigan
Brady Braun	P	Gardner–Webb
EJ Colson	QB	Incarnate Word
Brian Williams Jr.	IOL	Jackson State
Omoruyi Aliu-Otokiti	IOL	Livingstone
Tavorus Jones	RB	Missouri
Raymond Moore III	QB	Morgan State
Jaymon Lamb	OT	North Texas
Carver Cheeks	WR	Northern Colorado
Preston Hickey	DL	Northwestern State
Royal Capell	WR	Oklahoma State
Parker Cushing	K	Peru State
Elijah Fields	DL	Stephen F. Austin
Jayden Trapp	IOL	Texas A&M–Kingsville
Isaiah Bogerty	LB	Texas Southern
Donovan Howard	S	Virginia State
Cade Hechter	K	UT Martin
Carson Loeb	LS	UT Permian Basin
LaTristan Thompson	CB	Utah
Esteban Guillory	S	Western Illinois
