= 2025 All-SEC football team =

College football honor

The 2025 All-SEC football team consists of American football players selected to the All-Southeastern Conference (SEC) chosen by the Associated Press (AP) and the conference coaches for the 2025 Southeastern Conference football season.

Georgia won the conference, defeating Alabama, 28–7, in the SEC Championship.

Vanderbilt quarterback Diego Pavia was voted the conference's Offensive Player of the Year (AP and Coaches). Texas A&M defensive end Cashius Howell was selected the Defensive Player of the Year (AP and Coaches). Oklahoma placekicker Tate Sandell was named the SEC Special Teams Player of the Year. Tennessee wide receiver Braylon Staley was voted SEC Freshman of the Year (AP and Coaches). Ole Miss quarterback Trinidad Chambliss and Missouri running back Ahmad Hardy were voted SEC Newcomer of the Year (AP and Coaches respectively). Clark Lea of Vanderbilt was voted SEC Coach of the Year (AP and Coaches).

== Offensive selections ==
=== Quarterbacks ===
- Diego Pavia, Vanderbilt (AP-1, Coaches-1)
- Ty Simpson, Alabama (AP-2, Coaches-2)
- Trinidad Chambliss, Ole Miss (Coaches-2)
- Gunner Stockton (Coaches-3)

=== Running backs ===
- Ahmad Hardy, Missouri (AP-1, Coaches-1)
- Kewan Lacy, Ole Miss (AP-1, Coaches-1)
- Jadan Baugh, Florida (AP-2, Coaches-2)
- Mike Washington Jr., Arkansas (AP-2, Coaches-2)
- DeSean Bishop, Tennessee (Coaches-2)
- Nate Frazier, Georgia (Coaches-3)
- Jeremiah Cobb, Auburn (Coaches-3)

=== Wide receivers ===
- Chris Brazzell II, Tennessee (AP-1, Coaches-1)
- Isaiah Sategna III, Oklahoma (AP-1, Coaches-2)
- KC Concepcion, Texas A&M (AP-2, Coaches-1)
- Brenen Thompson, Mississippi State (AP-2, Coaches-3)
- Zachariah Branch, Georgia (Coaches-2)
- Ryan Wingo, Texas (Coaches-2)
- Mario Craver, Texas A&M (Coaches-3)

=== Centers ===
- Jake Slaughter, Florida (AP-1, Coaches-1)
- Drew Bobo, Georgia (AP-2, Coaches-2)
- Parker Brailsford, Alabama (Coaches-3)

=== Offensive line ===
- Kadyn Proctor, Alabama (AP-1, Coaches-1)
- Keagen Trost, Missouri (AP-1, Coaches-1)
- Wendell Moe Jr., Tennessee (AP-1)
- Cayden Green, Missouri (AP-1, Coaches-2)
- DJ Campbell, Texas (AP-1, Coaches-3)
- Trevor Goosby, Texas (AP-2, Coaches-1)
- Ar'maj Reed-Adams, Texas A&M (AP-2)
- Micah Morris, Georgia (AP-2)
- Trey Zuhn III, Texas A&M (Coaches-1)
- Fernando Carmona, Arkansas (Coaches-2)
- Monroe Freeling, Georgia (Coaches-2)
- Febechi Nwaiwu, Oklahoma (Coaches-2)
- Austin Barber, Florida (Coaches-3)
- Diego Pounds, Ole Miss (Coaches-3)
- Chase Bisontis, Texas A&M (Coaches-3)
- Lance Heard, Tennessee (Coaches-3)

=== Tight ends ===
- Eli Stowers, Vanderbilt (AP-1, Coaches-1)
- Rohan Jones, Arkansas (AP-2)
- Trey'Dez Green, LSU (Coaches-2)
- Dae'Quan Wright, Ole Miss (Coaches-2)
- Jaren Kanak, Oklahoma (Coaches-3)

== Defensive selections ==
=== Defensive linemen ===
- Cashius Howell, Texas A&M (AP-1, Coaches-1)
- Colin Simmons, Texas (AP-1, Coaches-1)
- Christen Miller, Georgia (AP-1)
- Will Echoles, Ole Miss (AP-1, Coaches-3)
- R Mason Thomas, Oklahoma (AP-2, Coaches-1)
- Quincy Rhodes Jr., Arkansas (AP-2, Coaches-2)
- Gracen Halton, Oklahoma (AP-2)
- Chris McClellan, Missouri (AP-2)
- Zion Young, Missouri (Coaches-1)
- Damon Wilson II, Missouri (Coaches-2)
- Taylor Wein, Oklahoma (Coaches-2)
- Dylan Stewart, South Carolina (Coaches-2)
- Keldric Faulk, Auburn (Coaches-3)
- Bryan Thomas Jr., South Carolina (Coaches-3)
- Keyron Crawford, Auburn (Coaches-3)

=== Linebackers ===
- CJ Allen, Georgia (AP-1, Coaches-1)
- Xavier Atkins, Auburn (AP-1, Coaches-1)
- Anthony Hill Jr., Texas (AP-1, Coaches-2)
- Josiah Trotter, Missouri (AP-2, Coaches-1)
- Taurean York, Texas A&M (AP-2, Coaches-3)
- Owen Heinecke, Oklahoma (AP-2)
- Arion Carter, Tennessee (Coaches-2)
- Deontae Lawson, Alabama (Coaches-2)
- Princewill Umanmielen, Ole Miss (Coaches-3)
- Harold Perkins, LSU (Coaches-3)

=== Defensive backs ===
- Mansoor Delane, LSU (AP-1, Coaches-1)
- Bray Hubbard, Alabama (AP-1, Coaches-1)
- A. J. Haulcy, LSU (AP-1, Coaches-1)
- Daylen Everette, Georgia (AP-1, Coaches-3)
- Michael Taaffe, Texas (AP-2, Coaches-1)
- Colton Hood, Tennessee (AP-2, Coaches-3)
- Ellis Robinson IV, Georgia (AP-2)
- Wydett Williams Jr., Ole Miss (AP-2)
- KJ Bolden, Georgia (Coaches-2)
- Peyton Bowen, Oklahoma (Coaches-2)
- Ty Bryant, Kentucky (Coaches-2)
- Jalon Kilgore, South Carolina (Coaches-2)
- Malik Muhammad, Texas (Coaches-2)
- Ty Redmond, Tennessee (Coaches-3)
- Kelley Jones, Mississippi State (Coaches-3)
- Eli Bowen, Oklahoma (Coaches-3)

== Special teams ==
=== Kickers ===
- Tate Sandell, Oklahoma (AP-1, Coaches-1)
- Peyton Woodring, Georgia (AP-2, Coaches-2)
- Damian Ramos, LSU (Coaches-3)

=== Punters ===
- Grayson Miller, Oklahoma (AP-1, Coaches-1)
- Brett Thorson, Georgia (AP-2, Coaches-2)
- Grant Chadwick, LSU (Coaches-3)

=== All-purpose/Return specialist ===
- KC Concepcion, Texas A&M (AP-1, Coaches-1)
- Ryan Niblett, Texas (AP-2, Coaches-2)
- Isaiah Sategna III, Oklahoma (Coaches-2)
- Zachariah Branch, Georgia (Coaches-3)
- Vicari Swain, South Carolina (Coaches-3)

== Key ==
Bold = Consensus first-team selection by both the coaches and AP

AP = Associated Press

Coaches = Selected by the SEC coaches

== See also ==
- 2025 Southeastern Conference football season
- 2025 College Football All-America Team
- Southeastern Conference football individual awards
