= Kelsey Hodges =

American soccer player (born 1991)

Personal information
- Date of birth: November 5, 1991 (age 34)
- Place of birth: Denton, Texas, United States
- Height: 1.70 m (5 ft 7 in)
- Position: Defender

College career
Years	Team	Apps	(Gls)
2010–2013	North Texas Mean Green	85	(32)

Senior career*
Years	Team	Apps	(Gls)
2014	Seattle Sounders Women		
2015	Rävåsens IK	19	(3)
2016	Alamein FC		
2017–2019	Celtic		
- * Club domestic league appearances and goals

Kelsey Hodges (born November 5, 1991) is an American former women's soccer player who played for Celtic.

== Early life and education ==
Hodges was born in Denton, Texas, on November 5, 1991, to Kevin and Ann Hodges. She began playing soccer when she was five years old.

Hodges attended John H. Guyer High School, where she played on the varsity team all four years. In addition to soccer, she also lettered in basketball and track, where she set a school record for long jump. She later received a bachelor's in business marketing from the University of North Texas.

== Career ==
From ages 12 to 15, Hodges participated in the United States' Olympic Development Programme; she later played for the Texas state team.

While attending University of North Texas, she played for the university's women's soccer team. She was a member of the All-Sun Belt First Team twice (2011, 2012), as well as a member of the First-Team All-C-USA (2013). In 2013, she was named the C-USA Defensive Player of the Year.

Hodges made her semi-professional debut in 2014 playing for Seattle Sounders Women, after which she played a year each for Rävåsens IK and Alamein FC.

she played semi-professionally for Women before moving to Sweden to Ravasens IK, followed by a stint in Australia with Alamein FC in Victoria.

In 2017, Hodges signed a long-term contract to play with Celtic F.C. Women.
