= Mr. Football (Michigan) =

American football award in Michigan

The Michigan Mr. Football is an award given to the best high school football player from the state of Michigan. It is presented by State Champs Sports Network and is sponsored by Hungry Howie's. Fan voting is used to determine one nominee for the final four candidates, and the award is given based on the player's performance that season. Athletes at any grade-level can be selected.

== Honorees ==
Year	Player	Position	High school	College	Reference
2008	Torsten Boss	WR	Lowell	Michigan State	
2009	Jason Fracasa	QB	Stevenson (Sterling Heights)	Northwood	
2010	Tommy Vento	QB/DB	Farmington Hills Harrison	Michigan State	
2011	Prescott Line	RB	Oxford	Southern Methodist	
2012	Mark Chapman	QB/DB	Port Huron	Central Michigan	
2013	Travis Smith	QB	Ithaca	Wake Forest	
2014	Alex Malzone	QB	Brother Rice	Michigan	
2015	Donnie Corley	WR	Martin Luther King	Michigan State	
2016	Cody White	WR	Walled Lake Western	Michigan State	
2017	La'Darius Jefferson	QB	Muskegon	Michigan State	
2018	Dequan Finn	QB	Martin Luther King	Toledo	
2019	Cameron Martinez	QB	Muskegon	Ohio State	
2020	Donovan Edwards	RB	West Bloomfield	Michigan	
2021	Dante Moore	QB	Martin Luther King	UCLA	
2022	Brady Drogosh	QB	De La Salle	Cincinnati	
2023	Isaiah "Zeke" Marshall	QB	Southfield A&T	Kansas	
2024	Bryce Underwood	QB	Belleville	Michigan	
2025	CJ Sadler	WR/DB	Detroit Cass Tech	North Carolina	
