= John H. Guyer High School =

Coordinates: 33.132891°N 97.103311°W

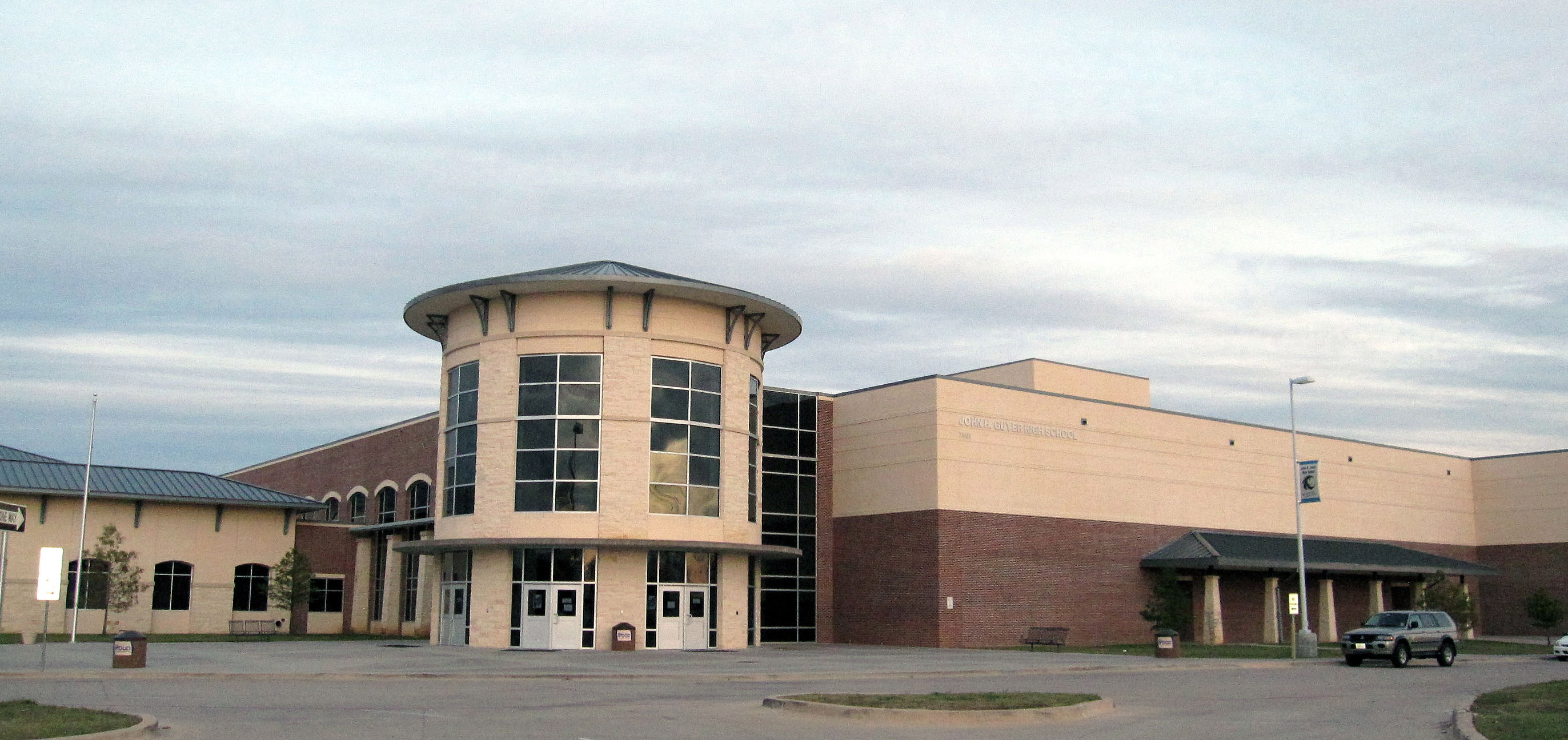

Location
- 7501 Teasley Lane; Denton, Texas 76210; United States

Information
- School type: Public high school
- Motto: "Where tradition begins and excellence continues"
- Established: 2005
- School district: Denton Independent School District
- Principal: Shaun Perry
- Staff: 172.61 (FTE)
- Grades: 9–12
- Enrollment: 2,570 (2023–2024)
- Student to teacher ratio: 14.89
- Campus type: Suburban
- Colors: Black, silver & blue
- Athletics conference: UIL Class 6A
- Mascot: Wildcats
- Website: John H. Guyer High School

John H. Guyer High School is a public high school situated in the city of Denton, Texas, in Denton County, United States and classified as a 6A school by the UIL. It is a part of the Denton Independent School District located in central Denton County. This was the third high school built by the district and was opened in 2005. In 2013, the school was rated "Academically Acceptable" by the Texas Education Agency.

The school's namesake was a former principal at Denton High School who later served as assistant to the Denton ISD Superintendent. Initially, officials of Denton ISD expected Guyer to be slow to grow, but those thoughts were soon disproved by the flood of transfers from other high schools in the area to Guyer. This unexpected influx of students made it necessary to add twelve portable classrooms to the original school. This upgrade sufficed until 2018 when a new 9th grade wing was built. Two new athletic field houses and changes to the surrounding parking lots were also made at this time. Construction was completed in 2021.

Its boundary includes sections of Denton, all of the census-designated place of Lantana, and sections of Bartonville, Copper Canyon, Corinth, Double Oak, and Flower Mound.

In 2023, Guyer was named one of the top schools in America by U.S. News & World Report.

== Athletics ==
=== State titles ===
- Football:
  - 2012(4A/D1), 2013(4A/D1)
- Girls soccer:
  - 2013(4A)
- Boys basketball
  - 2025(6A/D2)

== Notable alumni ==
- Jackson Arnold, quarterback for the Oklahoma Sooners,Auburn Tigers and for the UNLV Rebels
- Eli Bowen, defensive back for the Oklahoma Sooners
- Peyton Bowen, safety for the Oklahoma Sooners
- De'Vion Harmon, guard for the Westchester Knicks
- Jerrod Heard, wide receiver and quarterback who played for the Texas Longhorns
- Kelsey Hodges, soccer player who played for Celtic
- Patrick Morris, American football center who played for the Denver Broncos
- Jacob Rhame, baseball pitcher who played for the New York Mets
- Kevin Sperry, quarterback for the Florida State Seminoles
- Josh Stewart, wide receiver who played for the Oklahoma State Cowboys
- Eli Stowers, tight end for the Philadelphia Eagles
- Jalen Wilson, forward for the Brooklyn Nets
