= Rocky Beers =

American football player

No. 81 – Oklahoma Sooners
- Position: Tight end
- Class: Redshirt Senior

Personal information
- Listed height: 6 ft 5 in (1.96 m)
- Listed weight: 240 lb (109 kg)

Career information
- High school: Valor Christian (Highlands Ranch, Colorado)
- College: Air Force (2021–2022); FIU (2023–2024); Colorado State (2025); Oklahoma (2026–present)
- Stats at ESPN

Rocky Beers is an American football tight end for the Oklahoma Sooners. He previously played for the Air Force Falcons, FIU Panthers, and Colorado State Rams.

== Early life ==
Beers attended Valor Christian High School in Highlands Ranch, Colorado. He committed to play college football for the Air Force Falcons.

== College career ==
In two seasons at Air Force from 2021 to 2022, Beers played in 12 games, making no receptions. After the 2022 season, he entered the NCAA transfer portal.

Beers transferred to play for the FIU Panthers. In two seasons at FIU from 2023 to 2024, he hauled in 22 passes for 176 yards and two touchdowns. After the 2024 season, Beers again entered the NCAA transfer portal.

Beers transferred to play for the Colorado State Rams. He finished the 2025 season with 31 receptions for 388 yards and seven touchdowns, earning second-team all-Mountain West honors. After the season, Beers once again entered the NCAA transfer portal.

Beers transferred to play for the Oklahoma Sooners. In the 2026 season opener, he caught two passes for 43 yards and a touchdown in a win over UTEP.

== Personal life ==
Beers is the older brother of WNBA forward Raegan Beers.
