= Bowe Bentley =

American football player

Oklahoma Sooners
- Position: Quarterback

Personal information
- Listed height: 6 ft 1 in (1.85 m)
- Listed weight: 200 lb (91 kg)

Career information
- High school: Celina (Celina, Texas)

Bowe Bentley is an American football quarterback for the Oklahoma Sooners.

== Career ==
Bentley attended Celina High School in Celina, Texas. A backup his first two years, he took over as the starter his junior year in 2024 and threw for 3,211 yards with 47 touchdowns while rushing for 923 yards with 16 touchdowns. He was named the District 7-4A Division I Co-Offensive MVP and led the team to a win in the state championship game, where he threw a record-tying five touchdowns. After the season, Bentley participated in the Elite 11 competition.

A four-star recruit, Bentley was ranked among the best quarterbacks in his class and was selected to play in the 2026 Navy All-American Bowl. He committed to the University of Oklahoma to play college football. He officially signed on National Signing Day, December 3, 2025.
