= Hayden Hansen =

American football player (born 2003)

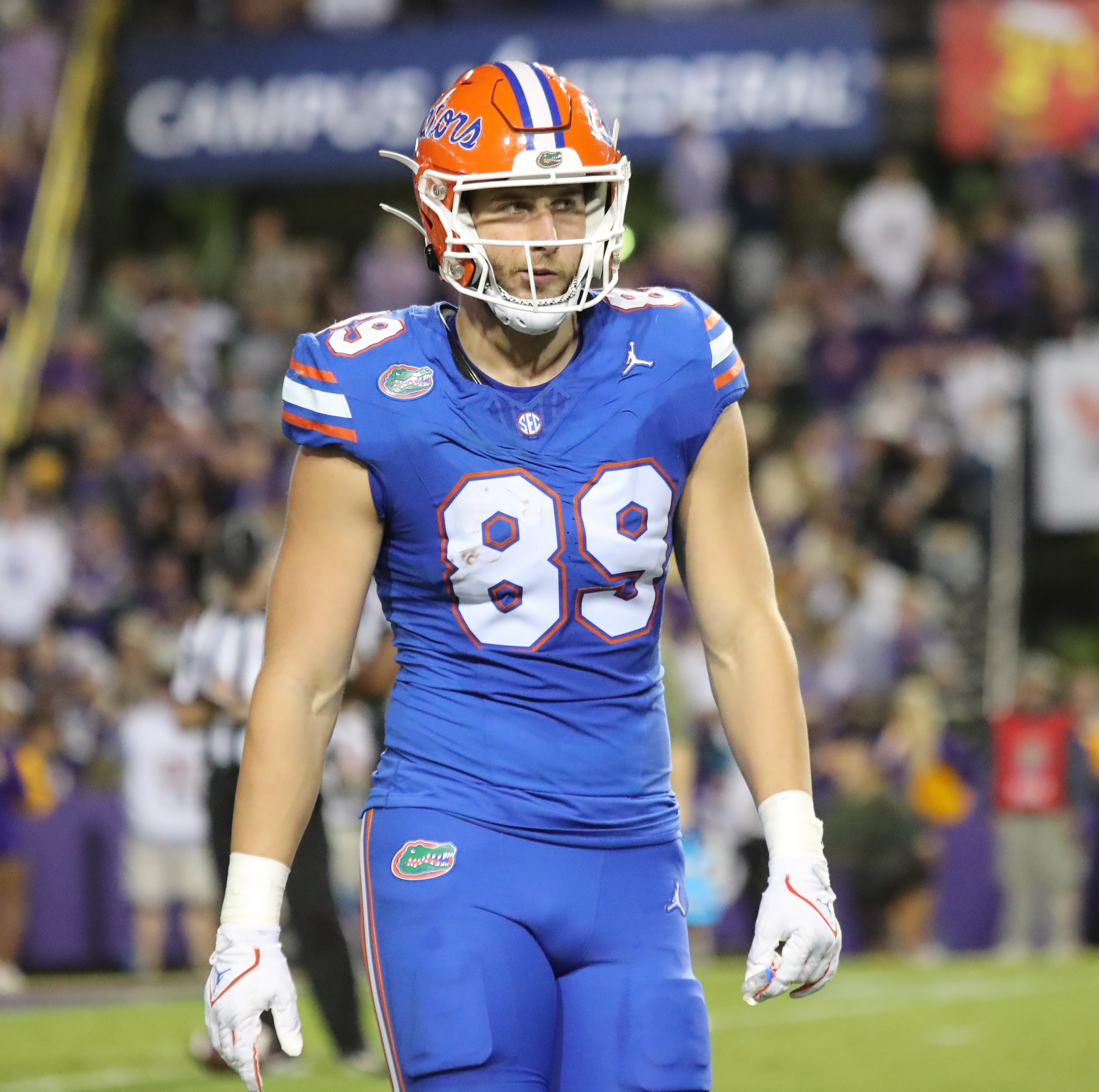
- Hansen with the Florida Gators in 2023.

No. 89 – Oklahoma Sooners
- Position: Tight end
- Class: Redshirt Senior

Personal information
- Born: July 8, 2003 (age 23)
- Listed height: 6 ft 8 in (2.03 m)
- Listed weight: 268 lb (122 kg)

Career information
- High school: Weatherford (Weatherford, Texas)
- College: Florida (2022–2025); Oklahoma (2026–present)
- Stats at ESPN

Hayden Hansen (born July 8, 2003) is an American college football tight end for the Oklahoma Sooners. He previously played for the Florida Gators.

== Early life ==
Hansen grew up in Weatherford, Texas and attended Weatherford High School. He caught 38 passes for 369 yards and three touchdowns as a senior. Hansen was initially rated a three-star recruit and initially committed to play college football at Louisiana but later flipped his commitment to Florida to follow former Ragin' Cajuns' head coach Billy Napier.

== College career ==
Hansen redshirted his true freshman season at Florida. He became the Gators' starting tight end during his redshirt freshman season and had 12 catches for 150 yards with two touchdowns. Hansen caught 15 passes for 207 yards and a touchdown.
