= Lloyd Avant =

American football player (born 2006)

No. 9 – Oklahoma Sooners
- Position: Running back
- Class: Junior

Personal information
- Born: March 31, 2006 (age 20); Rocky Mount, North Carolina, U.S.
- Listed height: 5 ft 10 in (1.78 m)
- Listed weight: 215 lb (98 kg)

Career information
- High school: Summer Creek (Houston, Texas)
- College: Tulsa (2024); Colorado State (2025); Oklahoma (2026–present)
- Stats at ESPN

Lloyd Avant (born March 31, 2006) is an American college football running back for the Oklahoma Sooners. He previously played for the Tulsa Golden Hurricane and Colorado State Rams.

== Early life ==
Avant attended Summer Creek High School in Houston, Texas. As a senior, he rushed for 2,122 yards and 30 touchdowns. A three-star recruit, Avant committed to play college football at the University of Tulsa.

== College career ==
As a freshman in 2024, Avant appeared in 12 games, rushing for 259 yards and a touchdown. Following the season, he transferred to Colorado State University. As a sophomore with the Rams, Avant recorded 90 carries for 417 yards and five touchdowns. At the conclusion of the season, he entered the transfer portal for the second time.

On January 5, 2026, Avant announced his decision to transfer to the University of Oklahoma to play for the Oklahoma Sooners. During the offseason, he competed for a starting role and ultimately won the job. Avant started at running back for the Sooners in their season opener against UTEP.

=== Statistics ===
College statistics
| Season | Team | Games | Rushing | | | | Receiving | | | |
| Season | Team | GP | Att | Yards | Avg | TD | Rec | Yards | Avg | TD |
|---|---|---|---|---|---|---|---|---|---|---|
| 2024 | Tulsa | 12 | 76 | 259 | 3.4 | 1 | 12 | 62 | 5.2 | 0 |
| 2025 | Colorado State | 12 | 90 | 417 | 4.6 | 5 | 24 | 261 | 10.9 | 1 |
| 2026 | Oklahoma | 1 | 15 | 79 | 5.3 | 1 | 1 | 6 | 6.0 | 0 |
| Career | | 25 | 181 | 755 | 4.2 | 7 | 37 | 329 | 8.9 | 1 |
