= Taylor Wein =

American football player

No. 44 – Oklahoma Sooners
- Position: Defensive lineman
- Class: (redshirt) Junior

Personal information
- Listed height: 6 ft 4 in (1.93 m)
- Listed weight: 276 lb (125 kg)

Career information
- High school: Nolensville (Nolensville, Tennessee)
- College: Oklahoma (2023–present)

Awards and highlights
- Second-team All-SEC (2025)
- Stats at ESPN

Taylor Wein is an American college football defensive lineman for the Oklahoma Sooners.

== Early life ==
Wein attended Nolensville High School in Nolensville, Tennessee. As a senior, he totaled 91 tackles, 31 tackles for loss, 13 sacks, and four forced fumbles. A four-star recruit, Wein committed to play college football at the University of Oklahoma.

== College career ==
Wein redshirted in 2023 and played sparingly in 2024, totaling two tackles. His production significantly increased in 2025, having a breakout season while becoming a starter on the Sooners' defensive line. Against South Carolina, Wein recorded four tackles, two tackles for loss, and his first career interception. Against No. 4 Alabama, he totaled three tackles, a sack, and forced fumble, while also blocking a field goal in a 23–21 victory.
