= Eli Bowen (American football) =

American football player (born 2005)

No. 23 – Oklahoma Sooners
- Position: Defensive back
- Class: Junior

Personal information
- Born: October 15, 2005 (age 21)
- Listed height: 5 ft 9 in (1.75 m)
- Listed weight: 185 lb (84 kg)

Career information
- High school: Guyer (Denton, Texas)
- College: Oklahoma (2024–present)

Awards and highlights
- Third-team All-SEC (2025)
- Stats at ESPN

Eli Bowen (born October 15, 2005) is an American college football defensive back for the Oklahoma Sooners.

== Early life ==
Bowen attended John H. Guyer High School in Denton, Texas. As a sophomore, he recorded 46 tackles and ten interceptions. As a senior, he totaled 34 tackles, two tackles-for-loss, and three interceptions. A four-star recruit, Bowen committed to play college football at the University of Oklahoma over an offer from Texas.

== College career ==
As a true freshman in 2024, Bowen received significant playing time, making an immediate impact. In his first career start against Texas, he led the team in tackles with eight. Against Alabama, Bowen recorded his first career interception at the collegiate level.

== Personal life ==
Bowen's brother, Peyton, plays safety for the Oklahoma Sooners.
