= Peyton Bowen =

American football cornerback (born 2004)

No. 22 – Oklahoma Sooners
- Position: Safety
- Class: Senior

Personal information
- Born: March 1, 2004 (age 22)
- Listed height: 6 ft 0 in (1.83 m)
- Listed weight: 203 lb (92 kg)

Career information
- High school: John H. Guyer (Denton, Texas)
- College: Oklahoma (2023–present)

Awards and highlights
- Second-team All-SEC (2025)
- Stats at ESPN

Peyton Bowen (born March 1, 2004) is an American college football safety for the Oklahoma Sooners.

== Early life ==
Bowen grew up in Denton, Texas. He attended and played high school football at John H. Guyer High School. He intercepted 12 passes and broke up 23 passes in three varsity seasons at Guyer.

=== Recruitment ===
Bowen was rated a five-star recruit by ESPN and initially committed Notre Dame over offers from Alabama, Oklahoma, and USC. He later flipped his commitment from Notre Dame to Oregon. However, the following day Bowen changed his commitment a second time and signed his National Letter of Intent to play at Oklahoma. He later explained that his decision was due to a paperwork issue as Oregon had not sent him a letter of intent to sign before the start of the early signing period.

== College career ==
Bowen joined the Oklahoma Sooners as an early enrollee in January 2023. He entered the season as the team's second-string safety.

== Personal life ==
Bowen's younger brother, Eli, plays defensive back for the Oklahoma Sooners.
