= Owen Heinecke =

American football player (born 2003)

No. 38 – Oklahoma Sooners
- Position: Linebacker
- Class: (redshirt) Senior

Personal information
- Born: March 21, 2003 (age 23)
- Listed height: 6 ft 1 in (1.85 m)
- Listed weight: 230 lb (104 kg)

Career information
- High school: Bishop Kelley (Tulsa, Oklahoma)
- College: Oklahoma (2022–present)

Awards and highlights
- Second-team All-SEC (2025)
- Stats at Pro Football Reference

Owen Heinecke (born March 21, 2003) is an American college football linebacker for the Oklahoma Sooners. He previously played college lacrosse for the Ohio State Buckeyes.

== Early life ==
Heinecke attended Bishop Kelley High School in Tulsa, Oklahoma, playing both running back and safety. A dual-sport athlete, he also played lacrosse, committing to Ohio State University for the sport following his high school career.

== College career ==
After one season of playing lacrosse at Ohio State, Heinecke transferred to the University of Oklahoma as a preferred walk-on to play football. After redshirting in 2022, he played sparingly in 2023 and 2024, mostly playing on special teams. Heinecke's production increased in 2025, leading the Sooners with seven tackles in a win against Michigan. In his first career start against Tennessee, he totaled 13 tackles, a sack, and a forced fumble, being named the SEC Defensive Player of the Week. Following the conclusion of the season, Heinecke was named second-team All-SEC.

== Professional career ==
Pre-draft measurables
Height	Weight	Arm length	Hand span	Wingspan	40-yard dash	10-yard split	20-yard split	20-yard shuttle	Three-cone drill	Vertical jump	Broad jump
6 ft 1 1/2 in (1.87 m)	227 lb (103 kg)	30 1/8 in (0.77 m)	9 3/4 in (0.25 m)	6 ft 2 1/2 in (1.89 m)	4.62 s	1.62 s	2.69 s	4.27 s	7.15 s	34.5 in (0.88 m)	9 ft 11 in (3.02 m)
All values from NFL Combine/Pro Day
