= Bryce Underwood =

American football player (born 2007)

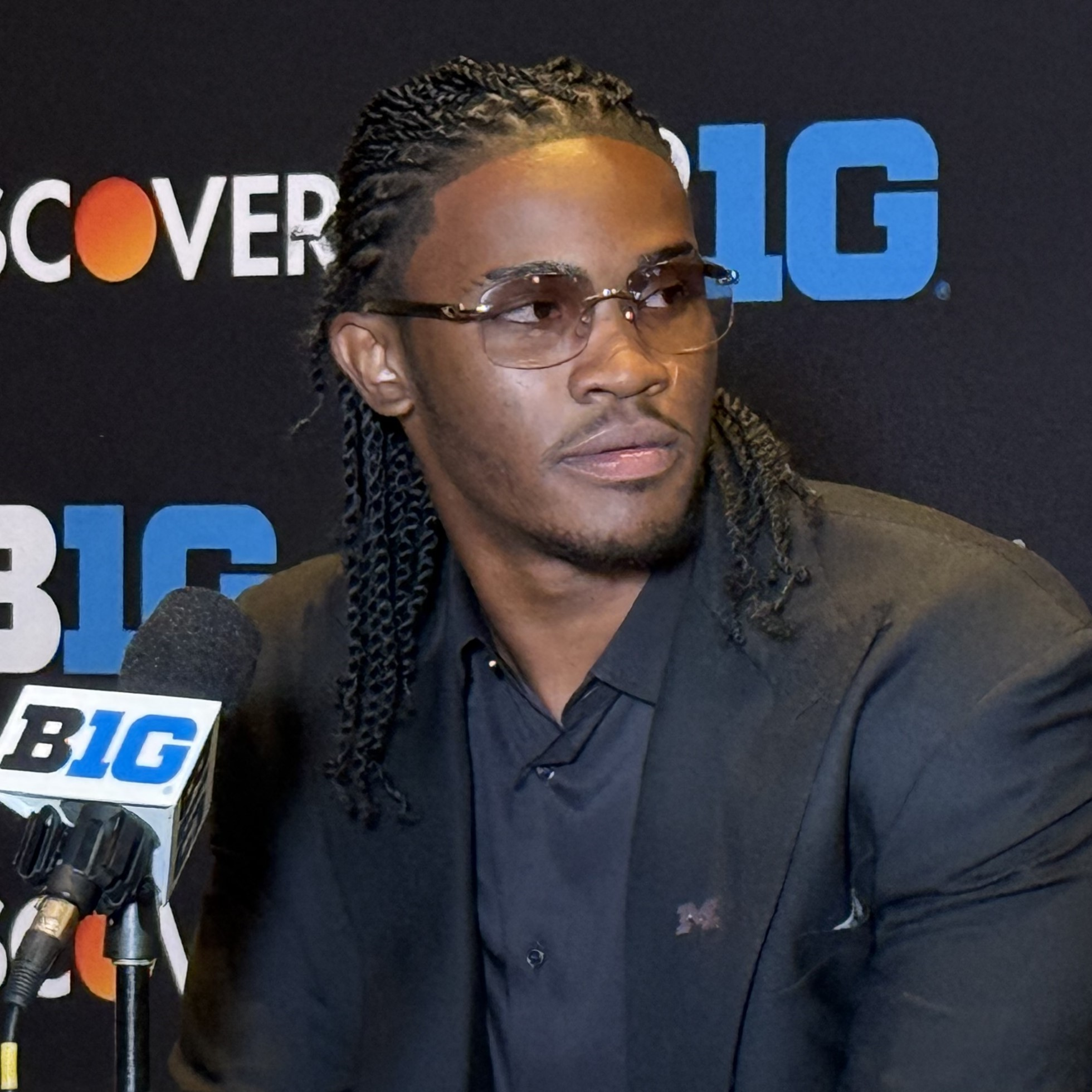
- Underwood at 2026 Big Ten Media Day

No. 19 – Michigan Wolverines
- Position: Quarterback
- Class: Sophomore

Personal information
- Born: August 19, 2007 (age 19); Detroit, Michigan, U.S.
- Listed height: 6 ft 4 in (1.93 m)
- Listed weight: 230 lb (104 kg)

Career information
- High school: Belleville (Belleville, Michigan)
- College: Michigan (2025–present)

Awards and highlights
- High school: 2× MHSAA Division 1 state champion (2021, 2022); MaxPreps National Freshman of the Year (2021); MaxPreps National Sophomore of the Year (2022); Michigan MaxPreps Player of the Year (2022); 2× Michigan High School Football Player of the Year (2023, 2024); 2× Michigan Associated Press Division 1-2 Player of the Year (2021, 2024); 2× Michigan Gatorade Player of the Year (2023, 2024); Michigan Mr. Football (2024)
- Stats at ESPN

Bryce Jay Underwood (born August 19, 2007) is an American college football quarterback for the Michigan Wolverines. He was a five-star recruit, and the consensus No. 1 overall ranked high school football player in the nation in the 2025 college football recruiting class.

== Early life ==
Underwood was born in Detroit, Michigan on August 19, 2007, the son of Jay and Beverly Underwood. He attended Belleville High School, and played football for the Tigers under coaches Dejuan Rogers and Calvin Norman. In 2021, Underwood's freshman season, he led his team to a Michigan High School Athletic Association (MHSAA) state championship. In the title game against Rochester Adams High School, he completed 12 of his 21 passing attempts for 284 yards and five touchdowns, while also rushing for 62 yards and a touchdown. In total for his freshman season, he threw for 2,888 yards and 39 touchdowns with just four interceptions, while also adding six scores on the ground. For his performance on the season, Underwood was named the MaxPreps National Freshman of the Year and the Michigan Associated Press Division 1-2 Player of the Year.

In 2022, his sophomore season, he passed for 2,762 yards with 37 touchdowns, while rushing for 632 yards and eight touchdowns. Underwood led Belleville to an undefeated season and a second consecutive state championship. Following the season, he was named the MaxPreps National Sophomore of the Year and the Michigan MaxPreps Player of the Year.

In 2023, his junior season, Underwood passed for 3,329 yards and 44 touchdowns with just three interceptions; while also rushing for 199 yards and seven touchdowns. He led Belleville to a third consecutive state championship appearance, but lost to Southfield A&T High School, snapping a 38 game winning streak throughout his high school career. Following his junior season, Underwood was voted the Michigan High School Football Player of the Year by the state media and awarded the Michigan Gatorade Player of the Year.

Entering his senior season, Underwood was rated as a five-star recruit, the No. 1 quarterback and the No. 1 overall player in the class of 2025. Underwood held offers from many schools, such as Louisiana State, Alabama, Ohio State, Florida, Penn State and Michigan. On January 6, 2024, Underwood initially committed to play college football for the LSU Tigers. On September 13, 2024, Underwood broke two MHSAA state records, for the most career passing touchdowns and most career total touchdowns, eclipsing the previous state records of 124 passing touchdowns and 151 total touchdowns. As a senior, Underwood failed to make a fourth consecutive appearance in the state championship game, losing to powerhouse Detroit Catholic Central High School in the regional championship. In total as a senior, he passed for 2,509 yards, throwing 32 touchdown passes and six interceptions, while also rushing for over 600 yards and an additional six touchdowns.

Following the season, he was awarded the Michigan Gatorade Player of the Year, voted the Michigan High School Football Player of the Year, and named the Michigan Associated Press Division 1-2 Player of the Year; winning all three for a second time in his career. He also won the 2024 Michigan Mr. Football Award. Underwood finished his four years at Belleville with a 50-4 record, two state championships, and was credited with 12,919 all-purpose yards and 179 total touchdowns; including passing for 11,488 yards and 152 touchdowns (all four being MHSAA state records).

On November 21, 2024, after his senior season, Underwood flipped his commitment from LSU to the Michigan Wolverines, staying in-state to play under head coach Sherrone Moore. At the time of his commitment, he was ranked as the No. 1 high school football player in the nation by ESPN, 247Sports and On3 in the 2025 college football recruiting class. On December 4, 2024, Underwood officially signed his national letter of intent (NLI) during the early signing period to play college football at the University of Michigan.

== College career ==
=== Freshman (2025) ===
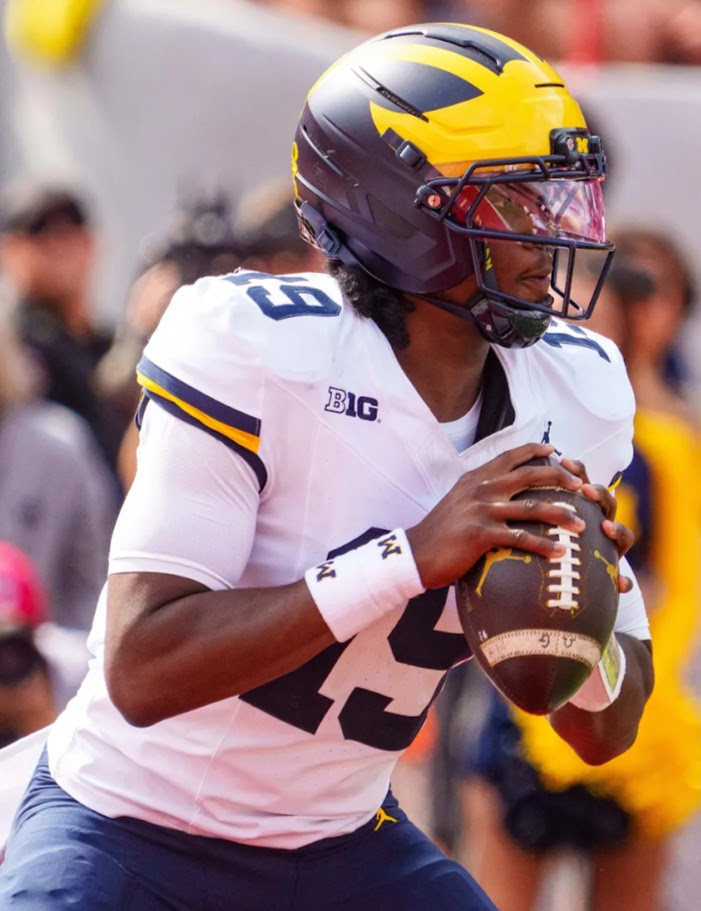
Underwood in 2025.

In December 2024, Underwood was admitted to the University of Michigan as an early enrollee. He first began practicing with the 2024 Michigan Wolverines in preparation for the ReliaQuest Bowl, but was ineligible to play in the game. In his freshman season, Underwood competed with sophomore Jadyn Davis and senior incoming transfer Mikey Keene for the starting quarterback position in 2025.

In May 2025, Underwood was chosen as one of numerous athletes to be included on the deluxe edition cover of EA Sports College Football 26. He was the first true freshman to ever be selected for the cover. In August, Underwood was named the starting quarterback the week before the 2025 season opening game against New Mexico, becoming only the fourth true freshman to start for the Michigan football program and the first since Tate Forcier in 2009.

In his first collegiate start against New Mexico, Underwood led the Wolverines to a win and completed 21-of-31 passes for 251 yards, a touchdown and had no turnovers. His first touchdown pass came on a 15-yard throw to Marlin Klein to end the second quarter. His 251 yards set a Michigan program record for a freshman quarterback in their debut. In game two, Underwood lost his first road start to Oklahoma, completing 9-of-24 passes for 142 yards. In game three against Central Michigan, he threw for 235 yards with a touchdown and an interception, adding nine carries for 114 yards and the first two rushing touchdowns of his career. Underwood earned Big Ten Freshman of the Week honors following the game.

In game four against Nebraska, Underwood threw for 105 yards and rushed for 61 yards and a touchdown. In game five against Wisconsin, he threw for a career-high 270 yards and a touchdown. In game six against USC, Underwood passed for 204 yards, two touchdowns and an interception. In game seven against Washington, he threw for 230 yards and two touchdowns. In game eight against Michigan State, Underwood led Michigan to a fourth consecutive win in the instate rivalry, passing for 86 yards and rushing for 26 yards and a touchdown. In game nine against Purdue, he led the Wolverines to a seventh win on the season. He finished the game with 145 yards passing and 44 yards rushing but had an interception and a fumble in the red zone. Underwood finished the 2025 season with 2,428 passing yards, 11 touchdowns, and nine interceptions, while also rushing for 392 yards and six touchdowns.

=== Sophomore (2026) ===
Under new head coach Kyle Whittingham, Underwood was voted by his teammates as the first sophomore captain in modern program history, an honor typically reserved for seniors. In the season opener against Western Michigan, Underwood threw the game-winning, 47-yard Hail Mary pass to JJ Buchanan for a touchdown as time expired in Michigan's 13–12 victory. He finished the game with 170 passing yards, rushed for Michigan's only other touchdown, and committed two turnovers: a fumble and an interception.

In game six against the Penn State Nittany Lions, Underwood was benched in favor of freshman Tommy Carr after throwing two interceptions in the first half, with Michigan going on to win 21–18. After the game, Whittingham announced that Underwood would be benched. This lasted four games until Underwood earned his 20th career start against the 10–0 No. 4 UCLA Bruins, leading Michigan to an 18–16 victory as he threw the game-winning pass in triple overtime.

=== Statistics ===
Year	Team	Games			Passing								Rushing			
Year	Team	GP	GS	Record	Cmp	Att	Pct	Yds	Y/A	TD	Int	Rtg	Att	Yds	Avg	TD
2025	Michigan	13	13	9–4	202	335	60.3	2,428	7.2	11	9	126.6	88	392	4.5	6
2026	Michigan	6	6	4–2	72	124	58.1	924	7.5	5	6	124.8	60	223	3.7	2
Career		19	19	13−6	274	459	59.7	3,352	7.3	16	15	126.0	148	615	4.2	8
