= Isaiah Sategna III =

American football player (born 2003)

No. 1 – Oklahoma Sooners
- Position: Wide receiver
- Class: Redshirt Senior

Personal information
- Born: July 11, 2003 (age 23)
- Listed height: 5 ft 10 in (1.78 m)
- Listed weight: 185 lb (84 kg)

Career information
- High school: Fayetteville (Fayetteville, Arkansas)
- College: Arkansas (2022–2024); Oklahoma (2025–present)

Awards and highlights
- First-team All-SEC (2025); First-team All-SEC Freshman (2023)
- Stats at ESPN

Isaiah Sategna III (born July 11, 2003) is an American college football wide receiver for the Oklahoma Sooners. He previously played for the Arkansas Razorbacks.

== Early life ==
Sategna III attended Fayetteville High School in Fayetteville, Arkansas. As a senior, he had 100 receptions for a nation-leading 1,908 yards and 17 touchdowns. For his career, he had 172 receptions for 3,261 receiving yards and 25 touchdowns. Sategna III originally committed to Texas A&M University and the University of Oregon before ultimately choosing the University of Arkansas.

== College career ==
In his first year at Arkansas in 2022, he redshirted after appearing in four games and recording two receptions for 12 yards. In 2023, he appeared in 12 games with one start and had 15 receptions for 129 yards with two touchdowns and 23 kick returns for 500 yards and 15 punt returns for 180 yards and one touchdown. In 2024, he started 10 of 12 games, finishing with 37 receptions for 491 yards with a touchdown. After the season, Sategna transferred to the University of Oklahoma. For the 2025 season, Sategna led OU in receptions (67), receiving yards (965), and receiving touchdowns (8) and was named 1st team All-SEC. The Sooners finished the season 10-3 after losing to Alabama in the first round of the playoffs. Sategna will return to Oklahoma for his senior season in 2026.
