= Trell Harris =

American football player

No. 11 – Oklahoma Sooners
- Position: Wide receiver
- Class: Redshirt Senior

Personal information
- Listed height: 6 ft 0 in (1.83 m)
- Listed weight: 200 lb (91 kg)

Career information
- High school: Nazareth Academy (La Grange Park, Illinois)
- College: Kent State (2022–2023); Virginia (2024–2025); Oklahoma (2026–present)

Awards and highlights
- Third-team All-ACC (2025)
- Stats at ESPN

Trell Harris is an American college football wide receiver for the Oklahoma Sooners. He previously played for the Kent State Golden Flashes and Virginia Cavaliers.

== Early life ==
Harris attended Nazareth Academy in La Grange Park, Illinois. As a senior, he had 54 receptions for 870 yards with 12 touchdowns and 750 return yards with six return touchdowns. He committed to Kent State University to play college football.

== College career ==
Harris played at Kent State in 2022 and 2023. Over the two years he recorded 39 receptions for 536 yards and two touchdowns. After the 2023 season Harris entered the transfer portal and transferred to the University of Virginia. He played in only four games his first year at Virginia in 2024 due to injury and had 15 receptions for 221 yards and two touchdowns. He played in all 13 games in 2025 and led the team with 59 receptions for 847 yards and five touchdowns. After the season, Harris again entered the transfer portal and committed to the University of Oklahoma.
