= Tate Sandell =

American football player (born 2003)

No. 29 – Oklahoma Sooners
- Position: Placekicker
- Class: Redshirt Senior

Personal information
- Born: October 14, 2003 (age 23)
- Listed height: 5 ft 9 in (1.75 m)
- Listed weight: 187 lb (85 kg)

Career information
- High school: Port Neches–Groves (Port Neches, Texas)
- College: UTSA (2022–2024); Oklahoma (2025–present)

Awards and highlights
- First-team All-American (2025); Lou Groza Award (2025); SEC Special Teams Player of the Year (2025)
- Stats at ESPN

Tate Sandell (born October 14, 2003) is an American college football placekicker for the Oklahoma Sooners. He previously played for the UTSA Roadrunners.

== Early life ==
Sandell is from Port Neches, Texas. He attended Port Neches–Groves High School where he played football as a placekicker and wide receiver. He also played soccer in high school. In football, he set a school record with 67 extra points made. Ranked as one of the top-15 kicker recruits nationally, he signed to play college football for the UTSA Roadrunners.

== College career ==
Sandell redshirted as a freshman at UTSA in 2022, recording 20 kickoffs and recovering an onside kick. He remained a kickoff specialist in 2023, setting the team record for touchbacks with 42 while also making one of two field goal attempts. He became the starting kicker as a redshirt-sophomore in 2024. That season, he converted 19 of 23 field goals and 35 of 36 extra points, setting the school record for longest field goal after being successful on a 54-yard attempt. He was named honorable mention All-American Athletic Conference (AAC) for his performance.

Sandell transferred to the Oklahoma Sooners in 2025. He set the school record for consecutive field goals made and also went viral for the short pants he wore when kicking, receiving national attention. He led the Southeastern Conference (SEC) in field goal percentage and made seven of seven attempts over 50 yards in the regular season, the best mark nationally. He was named the 2025 SEC Special Teams Player of the Year and Lou Groza Award winner for his performance.
