= 2025 Southeastern Conference football season =

Sports season in America

- League: NCAA Division I Football Bowl Subdivision
- Sport: Football
- Duration: August 28 – December 6, 2025
- Games: 8
- Teams: 16
- TV partner(s): ABC, ESPN, ESPN2, ESPN3, ESPNU, SEC Network, ESPN+ (streaming)

2026 NFL draft
- Top draft pick: Mansoor Delane
- Picked by: Kansas City Chiefs

SEC Championship Game
- Date: December 6, 2025
- Venue: Mercedes-Benz Stadium, Atlanta, Georgia
- Champions: Georgia Bulldogs
- Runners-up: Alabama Crimson Tide

SEC seasons
- 2024 2026

2025 Southeastern Conference football standings
	Conf.			Overall
Team	W		L	W		L
No. 9 Alabama y^	7	–	1	11	–	4
No. 6 Georgia y$^	7	–	1	12	–	2
No. 3 Ole Miss ^	7	–	1	13	–	2
No. 8 Texas A&M ^	7	–	1	11	–	2
No. 13 Oklahoma ^	6	–	2	10	–	3
No. 12 Texas	6	–	2	10	–	3
No. 15 Vanderbilt	6	–	2	10	–	3
Missouri	4	–	4	8	–	5
Tennessee	4	–	4	8	–	5
LSU	3	–	5	7	–	6
Kentucky	2	–	6	5	–	7
Florida	2	–	6	4	–	8
Auburn	1	–	7	5	–	7
Mississippi State	1	–	7	5	–	8
South Carolina	1	–	7	4	–	8
Arkansas	0	–	8	2	–	10
Championship: Georgia 28, Alabama 7
^ – College Football Playoff participant; $ – Conference champion; y – Championship game participant; Rankings from AP Poll

The 2025 Southeastern Conference football season was the 94th season of Southeastern Conference (SEC) football. This was the SEC's second season with 16 teams with the additions of Texas and Oklahoma, and its second season since 1991 with a non-divisional scheduling format.

== Preseason ==
2025 SEC Spring Football and number of signees on signing day:

- Alabama -
- Arkansas -
- Auburn -
- Florida -
- Georgia -
- Kentucky -
- LSU -
- Mississippi State -
- Missouri -
- Oklahoma -
- Ole Miss -
- South Carolina -
- Tennessee -
- Texas -
- Texas A&M -
- Vanderbilt -

=== Recruiting classes ===
National rankings
Team	ESPN	Rivals	24/7	On3 recruits	Total signees
Alabama	2	2	2	2	28
Arkansas	29	37	31	31	17
Auburn	9	8	10	8	20
Florida	10	15	13	10	20
Georgia	1	1	1	1	28
Kentucky	23	24	24	25	25
LSU	7	11	7	7	30
Mississippi State	26	26	28	26	26
Missouri	22	22	20	21	21
Oklahoma	8	7	8	9	28
Ole Miss	20	21	21	20	22
South Carolina	19	30	22	19	16
Tennessee	14	14	14	13	23
Texas	5	3	6	6	22
Texas A&M	18	20	19	17	17
Vanderbilt	45	40	40	39	21

Note: ESPN only ranks the top 40 teams.

=== 2025 Media Days ===
The 2025 SEC Media Days took place on July 14-17, 2025, at the College Football Hall of Fame and Omni Atlanta Hotel at Centennial Park in Downtown Atlanta.

This marks the third time since 2018 that Atlanta has hosted the annual preseason event. It was the fifth time they were held outside of Birmingham, AL. Each team was expected to have its head coach available to talk to the media at the event, which was televised on SEC Network and ESPN.

The schedule for the teams was:

Date	School	Coach	Player(s)
Monday July 14	LSU	Brian Kelly	
Monday July 14	Ole Miss	Lane Kiffin	
Monday July 14	South Carolina	Shane Beamer	
Monday July 14	Vanderbilt	Clark Lea	
Tuesday July 15	Auburn	Hugh Freeze	
Tuesday July 15	Georgia	Kirby Smart	
Tuesday July 15	Tennessee	Josh Heupel	
Tuesday July 15	Texas	Steve Sarkisian	
Wednesday July 16	Alabama	Kalen DeBoer	
Wednesday July 16	Florida	Billy Napier	
Wednesday July 16	Mississippi State	Jeff Lebby	
Wednesday July 16	Oklahoma	Brent Venables	
Thursday July 17	Arkansas	Sam Pittman	
Thursday July 17	Kentucky	Mark Stoops	
Thursday July 17	Missouri	Eliah Drinkwitz	
Thursday July 17	Texas A&M	Mike Elko	

==== Preseason media poll ====
Preseason polls were released on July 18, 2025.

SEC
Predicted finish	Team	Votes (1st place)
1	Texas	3060 (96)
2	Georgia	2957 (44)
3	Alabama	2783 (29)
4	LSU	2668 (20)
5	South Carolina	2109 (5)
6	Florida	1986 (2)
7	Ole Miss	1979 (1)
8	Texas A&M	1892
9	Tennessee	1700 (1)
10	Oklahoma	1613 (3)
11	Auburn	1272 (1)
12	Missouri	1170
13	Vanderbilt	936 (2)
14	Arkansas	764
15	Kentucky	512
16	Mississippi State	343

SEC
Predicted finish	Team	Votes
1	Texas	96
2	Georgia	44
3	Alabama	29
4	LSU	20
5	South Carolina	5
6	Oklahoma	3
7	Florida	2
7	Vanderbilt	2
8	Ole Miss	1
8	Tennessee	1
8	Auburn	1

=== Preseason awards ===
==== All−American Teams ====
Player	AP 1st Team	AP 2nd Team	AS 1st Team	AS 2nd Team	AS 3rd Team	AS 4th Team	WCFF 1st Team	WCFF 2nd Team	ESPN	CBS 1st Team	CBS 2nd Team	CFN 1st Team	CFN 2nd Team	PFF 1st Team	PFF 2nd Team	SI 1st Team	SI 2nd Team	SN 1st Team	SN 2nd Team	USAT 1st Team	USAT 2nd Team
CJ Allen				✓						✓							✓		✓		✓
K.J. Bolden		✓		✓							✓						✓		✓		
Parker Brailsford		✓		✓												✓					
Zachariah Branch											✓										
Barion Brown				✓					✓	✓											✓
Deion Burks						✓															
Fernando Carmona													✓								
Lucas Carneiro													✓				✓				
Cam Coleman		✓			✓												✓				
Kevin Concepcion						✓															
Jack Endries				✓									✓								
Daylen Everette						✓										✓					
Keldric Faulk					✓								✓								
Cayden Green		✓			✓			✓			✓	✓		✓		✓			✓		✓
Anthony Hill Jr.	✓		✓				✓		✓	✓		✓		✓		✓		✓		✓	
Tim Keenan III		✓				✓		✓									✓	✓			✓
Deontae Lawson					✓							✓					✓				
Arch Manning			✓									✓						✓			
Jermod McCoy	✓		✓				✓		✓	✓		✓		✓				✓		✓	
Christen Miller		✓				✓					✓	✓									✓
Malik Muhammad					✓								✓								
Garrett Nussmeier		✓									✓										✓
Jaydn Ott													✓								
LT Overton					✓				✓												
Harold Perkins Jr.		✓																			
Suntarine Perkins				✓				✓											✓		
Rayshawn Pleasant						✓		✓											✓		
Kadyn Proctor	✓		✓				✓		✓		✓	✓		✓		✓			✓	✓	
Ar'maj Reed-Adams	✓			✓				✓		✓		✓		✓				✓		✓	
Jaeden Roberts											✓								✓		
Keon Sabb						✓															
Tyreak Sapp					✓																
Kam Shanks					✓												✓	✓			
LaNorris Sellers						✓							✓								
Colin Simmons	✓		✓				✓			✓				✓		✓			✓		✓
Jake Slaughter	✓		✓				✓		✓	✓		✓		✓			✓	✓		✓	
Dylan Stewart	✓		✓				✓		✓	✓								✓		✓	
Eli Stowers	✓		✓				✓		✓	✓				✓		✓		✓		✓	
Michael Taaffe				✓				✓	✓									✓			✓
Brett Thorson	✓		✓				✓		✓	✓				✓		✓		✓		✓	
Jacob Ulrich													✓								
Whit Weeks	✓		✓					✓			✓						✓		✓	✓	
Ryan Coleman-Williams	✓		✓				✓		✓	✓		✓		✓			✓	✓		✓	
Eugene Wilson III						✓															
Quintrevion Wisner						✓													✓		
Peyton Woodring		✓			✓						✓								✓		
Taurean York		✓	✓				✓							✓							
Trey Zuhn III						✓															

==== Individual awards ====
Award	Head coach/player	School	Position	Year	Ref
Lott Trophy	Deontae Lawson	Alabama	LB	R-Sr.	
Lott Trophy	LT Overton	Alabama	DL	Sr.	
Lott Trophy	Xavian Sorey Jr.	Arkansas	LB	Sr.	
Lott Trophy	Keldric Faulk	Auburn	DE	Jr.	
Lott Trophy	Caleb Banks	Florida	DL	Sr.	
Lott Trophy	Daylen Everette	Georgia	DB	Sr.	
Lott Trophy	Harold Perkins	LSU	LB	R-Jr.	
Lott Trophy	Whit Weeks	LSU	LB	Jr.	
Lott Trophy	R Mason Thomas	Oklahoma	DL	So.	
Lott Trophy	Dylan Stewart	South Carolina	EDGE	So.	
Lott Trophy	Jalon Kilgore	South Carolina	DB	Jr.	
Lott Trophy	Jermod McCoy	Tennessee	DB	Jr.	
Lott Trophy	Anthony Hill Jr.	Texas	LB	Jr.	
Lott Trophy	Colin Simmons	Texas	EDGE	So.	
Lott Trophy	Michael Taaffe	Texas	S	R-Sr.	
Lott Trophy	Taurean York	Texas A&M	LB	Jr.	
Dodd Trophy	Kalen DeBoer	Alabama	HC	--	
Dodd Trophy	Kirby Smart	Georgia	HC	--	
Dodd Trophy	Brian Kelly	LSU	HC	--	
Dodd Trophy	Eliah Drinkwitz	Missouri	HC	--	
Dodd Trophy	Brent Venables	Oklahoma	HC	--	
Dodd Trophy	Josh Heupel	Tennessee	HC	--	
Dodd Trophy	Steve Sarkisian	Texas	HC	--	
Dodd Trophy	Mike Elko	Texas A&M	HC	--	
Maxwell Award	Ryan Coleman-Williams	Alabama	WR	So.	
Maxwell Award	Taylen Green	Arkansas	QB	Sr.	
Maxwell Award	Jackson Arnold	Auburn	QB	Jr.	
Maxwell Award	Cam Coleman	Auburn	WR	So.	
Maxwell Award	DJ Lagway	Florida	QB	So.	
Maxwell Award	Nate Frazier	Georgia	RB	So.	
Maxwell Award	Garrett Nussmeier	LSU	QB	Sr.	
Maxwell Award	Caden Durham	LSU	RB	So.	
Maxwell Award	Ahmad Hardy	Missouri	RB	So.	
Maxwell Award	John Mateer	Oklahoma	QB	Jr.	
Maxwell Award	Jaydn Ott	Oklahoma	RB	Sr.	
Maxwell Award	LaNorris Sellers	South Carolina	QB	So.	
Maxwell Award	Arch Manning	Texas	QB	So.	
Maxwell Award	Quintrevion Wisner	Texas	RB	Jr.	
Maxwell Award	Marcel Reed	Texas A&M	QB	So.	
Maxwell Award	Le'Veon Moss	Texas A&M	RB	Sr.	
Maxwell Award	Diego Pavia	Vanderbilt	QB	GS.	
Outland Trophy	Parker Brailsford	Alabama	OL	R-Jr.	
Outland Trophy	Kadyn Proctor	Alabama	OL	Jr.	
Outland Trophy	Jaeden Roberts	Alabama	OL	R-Sr.	
Outland Trophy	Fernando Carmona	Arkansas	OL	R-Sr.	
Outland Trophy	Austin Barber	Florida	OL	Jr.	
Outland Trophy	Jake Slaughter	Florida	OL	R-Sr.	
Outland Trophy	Christen Miller	Georgia	DL	Sr.	
Outland Trophy	Cayden Green	Missouri	OL	So.	
Outland Trophy	DJ Campbell	Texas	OL	Sr.	
Outland Trophy	Ar'maj Reed-Adams	Texas A&M	OL	Sr.	
Outland Trophy	Trey Zuhn III	Texas A&M	OL	Jr.	
Bronko Nagurski Trophy	Deontae Lawson	Alabama	LB	R-Sr.	
Bronko Nagurski Trophy	LT Overton	Alabama	DL	Sr.	
Bronko Nagurski Trophy	Tim Keenan III	Alabama	DL	R-Sr.	
Bronko Nagurski Trophy	Keldric Faulk	Auburn	DE	Jr.	
Bronko Nagurski Trophy	Caleb Banks	Florida	DL	Sr.	
Bronko Nagurski Trophy	Christen Miller	Georgia	DL	Sr.	
Bronko Nagurski Trophy	CJ Allen	Georgia	LB	So.	
Bronko Nagurski Trophy	Daylen Everette	Georgia	DB	Jr.	
Bronko Nagurski Trophy	KJ Bolden	Georgia	S	So.	
Bronko Nagurski Trophy	Whit Weeks	LSU	LB	Jr.	
Bronko Nagurski Trophy	Kip Lewis	Oklahoma	LB	R-Jr.	
Bronko Nagurski Trophy	Suntarine Perkins	Ole Miss	LB	Jr.	
Bronko Nagurski Trophy	Dylan Stewart	South Carolina	EDGE	So.	
Bronko Nagurski Trophy	Jermod McCoy	Tennessee	DB	Jr.	
Bronko Nagurski Trophy	Anthony Hill Jr.	Texas	LB	Jr.	
Bronko Nagurski Trophy	Colin Simmons	Texas	EDGE	So.	
Bronko Nagurski Trophy	Michael Taaffe	Texas	S	R-Sr.	
Bronko Nagurski Trophy	Will Lee III	Texas A&M	CB	Jr.	
Butkus Award	Deontae Lawson	Alabama	LB	Sr.	
Butkus Award	Justin Jefferson	Alabama	LB	Sr.	
Butkus Award	Xavian Sorey Jr.	Arkansas	LB	Sr.	
Butkus Award	CJ Allen	Georgia	LB	So.	
Butkus Award	Chris Cole	Georgia	LB	So.	
Butkus Award	Alex Afari	Kentucky	LB	Sr.	
Butkus Award	Harold Perkins	LSU	LB	R-Jr.	
Butkus Award	Whit Weeks	LSU	LB	Jr.	
Butkus Award	Jalen Smith	Mississippi State	LB	R-So.	
Butkus Award	Triston Newson	Missouri	LB	GS.	
Butkus Award	Kip Lewis	Oklahoma	LB	R-Jr.	
Butkus Award	Sammy Omosigho	Oklahoma	LB	Jr.	
Butkus Award	Andrew Jones	Ole Miss	LB	Sr.	
Butkus Award	TJ Dottery	Ole Miss	LB	Jr.	
Butkus Award	Arion Carter	Tennessee	LB	Jr.	
Butkus Award	Anthony Hill Jr.	Texas	LB	Jr.	
Butkus Award	Liona Lefau	Texas	LB	Jr.	
Butkus Award	Taurean York	Texas A&M	LB	Jr.	
Jim Thorpe Award	Daylen Everette	Georgia	DB	Sr.	
Jim Thorpe Award	KJ Bolden	Georgia	DB	So.	
Jim Thorpe Award	Jermod McCoy	Tennessee	DB	Jr.	
Jim Thorpe Award	Malik Muhammad	Texas	DB	Jr.	
Jim Thorpe Award	Michael Taaffe	Texas	DB	R-Sr.	
Paul Hornung Award	Ryan Coleman-Williams	Alabama	WR	So.	
Paul Hornung Award	Kam Shanks	Arkansas	WR	R-So.	
Paul Hornung Award	Jadan Baugh	Florida	RB	So.	
Paul Hornung Award	Zavion Thomas	LSU	WR	Sr.	
Paul Hornung Award	Davon Booth	Mississippi State	RB	GS.	
Paul Hornung Award	KC Concepcion	Texas A&M	WR	Jr.	
Paul Hornung Award	Martel Hight	Vanderbilt	CB	Jr.	
Wuerffel Trophy	LT Overton	Alabama	DL	Sr.	
Wuerffel Trophy	Cam Bell	Arkansas	DL	R-Sr.	
Wuerffel Trophy	Jeremiah Wright	Auburn	OL	R-Sr.	
Wuerffel Trophy	DJ Lagway	Florida	QB	So.	
Wuerffel Trophy	Jordan Hall	Georgia	DL	Jr.	
Wuerffel Trophy	Josh Kattus	Kentucky	TE	Sr.	
Wuerffel Trophy	Harold Perkins	LSU	LB	R-Jr.	
Wuerffel Trophy	Jacoby Jackson	Mississippi State	OL	R-Sr.	
Wuerffel Trophy	Connor Tollison	Missouri	OL	GS.	
Wuerffel Trophy	Robert Spears-Jennings	Oklahoma	S	Jr.	
Wuerffel Trophy	Diego Pounds	Ole Miss	OL	Sr.	
Wuerffel Trophy	Bryson Eason	Tennessee	DL	R-Sr.	
Wuerffel Trophy	Michael Taaffe	Texas	S	R-Sr.	
Wuerffel Trophy	Albert Regis	Texas A&M	DL	GS.	
Wuerffel Trophy	Marlen Sewell	Vanderbilt	DT/S	GS.	
Lou Groza Award	Alex McPherson	Auburn	PK	Jr.	
Lou Groza Award	Trey Smack	Florida	PK	Sr.	
Lou Groza Award	Peyton Woodring	Georgia	PK	Jr.	
Lou Groza Award	Damian Ramos	LSU	PK	5Yr.	
Lou Groza Award	Blake Craig	Missouri	PK	R-So.	
Lou Groza Award	Lucas Carneiro	Ole Miss	PK	Jr.	
Lou Groza Award	Tate Sandell	Oklahoma	PK	R-Jr.	
Lou Groza Award	Max Gilbert	Tennessee	PK	R-So.	
Lou Groza Award	Randy Bond	Texas A&M	PK	GS.	
Lou Groza Award	Brock Taylor	Vanderbilt	PK	So.	
Ray Guy Award	Devin Bale	Arkansas	P	R-Sr.	
Ray Guy Award	Brett Thorson	Georgia	P	Sr.	
Ray Guy Award	Jacob Ulrich	Oklahoma	P	R-So.	
Ray Guy Award	Jack Bouwmeester	Texas	P	Sr.	
Ray Guy Award	Tyler White	Texas A&M	P	So.	
Patrick Mannelly Award	David Bird	Alabama	LS	Jr.	
Patrick Mannelly Award	Rocco Underwood	Florida	LS	R-Sr.	
Patrick Mannelly Award	Beau Gardner	Georgia	LS	R-Sr.	
Patrick Mannelly Award	Ben Anderson	Oklahoma	LS	R-Jr.	
Patrick Mannelly Award	Jacob Graham	Texas A&M	LS	Gr.	
Walter Camp Award	Ryan Coleman-Williams	Alabama	WR	So.	
Walter Camp Award	DJ Lagway	Florida	QB	So.	
Walter Camp Award	Garrett Nussmeier	LSU	QB	Sr.	
Walter Camp Award	John Mateer	Oklahoma	QB	Jr.	
Walter Camp Award	Dylan Stewart	South Carolina	EDGE	So.	
Walter Camp Award	LaNorris Sellers	South Carolina	QB	So.	
Walter Camp Award	Arch Manning	Texas	QB	So.	
Walter Camp Award	Anthony Hill Jr.	Texas	LB	Jr.	
Walter Camp Award	Colin Simmons	Texas	EDGE	So.	
Walter Camp Award	Diego Pavia	Vanderbilt	QB	GS.	
Walter Camp Award	Eli Stowers	Vanderbilt	TE	GS.	
Doak Walker Award	Jam Miller	Alabama	RB	Sr.	
Doak Walker Award	Braylen Russell	Arkansas	RB	So.	
Doak Walker Award	Jadan Baugh	Florida	RB	So.	
Doak Walker Award	Josh McCray	Georgia	RB	R-Sr.	
Doak Walker Award	Nate Frazier	Georgia	RB	So.	
Doak Walker Award	Ahmad Hardy	Missouri	RB	So.	
Doak Walker Award	Davon Booth	Mississippi State	RB	GS.	
Doak Walker Award	Fluff Bothwell	Mississippi State	RB	So.	
Doak Walker Award	Jaydn Ott	Oklahoma	RB	Sr.	
Doak Walker Award	DeSean Bishop	Tennessee	RB	R-So.	
Doak Walker Award	Star Thomas	Tennessee	RB	Sr.	
Doak Walker Award	CJ Baxter	Texas	RB	R-So.	
Doak Walker Award	Quintrevion Wisner	Texas	RB	Jr.	
Doak Walker Award	Le'Veon Moss	Texas A&M	RB	Sr.	
Doak Walker Award	Rueben Owens II	Texas A&M	RB	So.	
Doak Walker Award	Sedrick Alexander	Vanderbilt	RB	Jr.	
Biletnikoff Award	Germie Bernard	Alabama	WR	Sr.	
Biletnikoff Award	Ryan Coleman-Williams	Alabama	WR	So.	
Biletnikoff Award	O'Mega Blake	Arkansas	WR	R-Sr.	
Biletnikoff Award	Cam Coleman	Auburn	WR	So.	
Biletnikoff Award	Eric Singleton Jr.	Auburn	WR	Jr.	
Biletnikoff Award	Aaron Anderson	LSU	WR	R-Jr.	
Biletnikoff Award	Kevin Coleman Jr.	Missouri	WR	Sr.	
Biletnikoff Award	Cayden Lee	Ole Miss	WR	Jr.	
Biletnikoff Award	De'Zhaun Stribling	Ole Miss	WR	R-Sr.	
Biletnikoff Award	Harrison Wallace III	Ole Miss	WR	R-Sr.	
Biletnikoff Award	Jack Endries	Texas	TE	R-Jr.	
Biletnikoff Award	Eli Stowers	Vanderbilt	TE	GS.	

Award	Head Coach/Player	School	Position	Year	Ref
Davey O'Brien Award	Taylen Green	Arkansas	QB	Sr.	
Davey O'Brien Award	DJ Lagway	Florida	QB	So.	
Davey O'Brien Award	Garrett Nussmeier	LSU	QB	Sr.	
Davey O'Brien Award	John Mateer	Oklahoma	QB	Jr.	
Davey O'Brien Award	LaNorris Sellers	South Carolina	QB	So.	
Davey O'Brien Award	Arch Manning	Texas	QB	So.	
Davey O'Brien Award	Diego Pavia	Vanderbilt	QB	GS	
John Mackey Award	Josh Cuevas	Alabama	TE	Sr.	
John Mackey Award	Hayden Hansen	Florida	TE	Jr.	
John Mackey Award	Lawson Luckie	Georgia	TE	Jr.	
John Mackey Award	Oscar Delp	Georgia	TE	Sr.	
John Mackey Award	Bauer Sharp	LSU	TE	5Yr.	
John Mackey Award	Brett Norfleet	Missouri	TE	Jr.	
John Mackey Award	Luke Hasz	Ole Miss	TE	Jr.	
John Mackey Award	Dae'Quan Wright	Ole Miss	TE	Sr.	
John Mackey Award	Miles Kitselman	Tennessee	TE	Sr.	
John Mackey Award	Jack Endries	Texas	TE	R-Jr.	
John Mackey Award	Eli Stowers	Vanderbilt	TE	GS.	
Rimington Trophy	Parker Brailsford	Alabama	OL	R-Jr.	
Rimington Trophy	Caden Kitler	Arkansas	OL	R-Jr.	
Rimington Trophy	Connor Lew	Auburn	OL	Jr.	
Rimington Trophy	Jake Slaughter	Florida	OL	R-Sr.	
Rimington Trophy	Drew Bobo	Georgia	OL	R-Jr.	
Rimington Trophy	Connor Tollison	Missouri	OL	GS.	
Rimington Trophy	Jordan White	Vanderbilt	OL	GS.	
Bednarik Award	Deontae Lawson	Alabama	LB	R-Sr.	
Bednarik Award	Tim Keenan III	Alabama	DL	R-Sr.	
Bednarik Award	Xavian Sorey Jr.	Arkansas	LB	Sr.	
Bednarik Award	Keldric Faulk	Auburn	DE	Jr.	
Bednarik Award	Shemar James	Florida	DT	Sr.	
Bednarik Award	Tyreak Sapp	Florida	DE	Sr.	
Bednarik Award	Christen Miller	Georgia	DT	Jr.	
Bednarik Award	CJ Allen	Georgia	LB	Jr.	
Bednarik Award	Daylen Everette	Georgia	CB	Sr.	
Bednarik Award	KJ Bolden	Georgia	CB	So.	
Bednarik Award	Harold Perkins	LSU	LB	R-Jr.	
Bednarik Award	Whit Weeks	LSU	LB	Jr.	
Bednarik Award	R Mason Thomas	Oklahoma	DL	So.	
Bednarik Award	Suntarine Perkins	Ole Miss	LB	Jr.	
Bednarik Award	Dylan Stewart	South Carolina	EDGE	So.	
Bednarik Award	Jermod McCoy	Tennessee	DB	Jr.	
Bednarik Award	Arion Carter	Tennessee	LB	Jr.	
Bednarik Award	Anthony Hill Jr.	Texas	LB	Jr.	
Bednarik Award	Colin Simmons	Texas	EDGE	So.	
Bednarik Award	Michael Taaffe	Texas	S	R-Sr.	
Bednarik Award	Taurean York	Texas A&M	LB	Jr.	
Bednarik Award	Will Lee III	Texas A&M	CB	Jr.	
Bednarik Award	Bryan Longwell	Vanderbilt	LB	Jr.	
Rotary Lombardi Award	Deontae Lawson	Alabama	LB	R-Sr.	
Rotary Lombardi Award	Tim Keenan III	Alabama	DL	R-Sr.	
Rotary Lombardi Award	Kadyn Proctor	Alabama	OL	Jr.	
Rotary Lombardi Award	Parker Brailsford	Alabama	OL	R-Jr.	
Rotary Lombardi Award	Jake Slaughter	Florida	OL	R-Sr.	
Rotary Lombardi Award	Earnest Greene III	Georgia	OL	R-Jr.	
Rotary Lombardi Award	Whit Weeks	LSU	LB	Jr.	
Rotary Lombardi Award	Josiah Trotter	Missouri	LB	R-So.	
Rotary Lombardi Award	Suntarine Perkins	Ole Miss	LB	Jr.	
Rotary Lombardi Award	R Mason Thomas	Oklahoma	DL	So.	
Rotary Lombardi Award	Anthony Hill Jr.	Texas	LB	Jr.	
Rotary Lombardi Award	Colin Simmons	Texas	EDGE	So.	
Rotary Lombardi Award	DJ Campbell	Texas	OL	Sr.	
Rotary Lombardi Award	Jack Endries	Texas	TE	R-Jr.	
Rotary Lombardi Award	Trey Zuhn III	Texas A&M	OL	Jr.	
Rotary Lombardi Award	Eli Stowers	Vanderbilt	TE	GS.	
Manning Award	Taylen Green	Arkansas	QB	Sr.	
Manning Award	Garrett Nussmeier	LSU	QB	Sr.	
Manning Award	LaNorris Sellers	South Carolina	QB	So.	
Manning Award	Marcel Reed	Texas A&M	QB	So.	
Manning Award	Diego Pavia	Vanderbilt	QB	GS	
Polynesian College Football Player Of The Year Award	Jaydn Ott	Oklahoma	RB	Sr.	
Polynesian College Football Player Of The Year Award	Kapena Gushiken	Ole Miss	CB	Sr.	
Polynesian College Football Player Of The Year Award	Jaxson Moi	Tennessee	DL	Sr.	
Polynesian College Football Player Of The Year Award	Liona Lefau	Texas	LB	Jr.	
Polynesian College Football Player Of The Year Award	Mark Nabou Jr.	Texas A&M	OL	So.	
Johnny Unitas Golden Arm Award	Ty Simpson	Alabama	QB	R-Jr.	
Johnny Unitas Golden Arm Award	Taylen Green	Arkansas	QB	Sr.	
Johnny Unitas Golden Arm Award	Jackson Arnold	Auburn	QB	Jr.	
Johnny Unitas Golden Arm Award	Gunner Stockton	Georgia	QB	R-Jr.	
Johnny Unitas Golden Arm Award	Zach Calzada	Kentucky	QB	Gr.	
Johnny Unitas Golden Arm Award	Garrett Nussmeier	LSU	QB	R-Sr.	
Johnny Unitas Golden Arm Award	Blake Shapen	Mississippi State	QB	Gr.	
Johnny Unitas Golden Arm Award	John Mateer	Oklahoma	QB	Jr.	
Johnny Unitas Golden Arm Award	LaNorris Sellers	South Carolina	QB	R-So.	
Johnny Unitas Golden Arm Award	Joey Aguilar	Tennessee	QB	R-Sr.	
Johnny Unitas Golden Arm Award	Arch Manning	Texas	QB	R-So.	
Johnny Unitas Golden Arm Award	Diego Pavia	Vanderbilt	QB	Gr.	
Earl Campbell Tyler Rose Award	Jam Miller	Alabama	RB	Sr.	
Earl Campbell Tyler Rose Award	Taylen Green	Arkansas	QB	Sr.	
Earl Campbell Tyler Rose Award	Jackson Arnold	Auburn	QB	Jr.	
Earl Campbell Tyler Rose Award	DJ Lagway	Florida	QB	So.	
Earl Campbell Tyler Rose Award	Cash Jones	Georgia	RB	Sr.	
Earl Campbell Tyler Rose Award	Dillon Bell	Georgia	RB	Sr.	
Earl Campbell Tyler Rose Award	Noah Thomas	Georgia	WR	Sr.	
Earl Campbell Tyler Rose Award	Seth McGowan	Kentucky	WR	Sr.	
Earl Campbell Tyler Rose Award	Garrett Nussmeier	LSU	QB	R-Sr.	
Earl Campbell Tyler Rose Award	Brenen Thompson	Mississippi State	WR	Sr.	
Earl Campbell Tyler Rose Award	Kewan Lacy	Ole Miss	RB	So.	
Earl Campbell Tyler Rose Award	John Mateer	Oklahoma	QB	Jr.	
Earl Campbell Tyler Rose Award	Chris Brazzell II	Tennessee	WR	R-Jr.	
Earl Campbell Tyler Rose Award	CJ Baxter	Texas	RB	R-So.	
Earl Campbell Tyler Rose Award	Quintrevion Wisner	Texas	RB	Jr.	
Earl Campbell Tyler Rose Award	DeAndre Moore Jr.	Texas	WR	Jr.	
Earl Campbell Tyler Rose Award	Trey Zuhn III	Texas A&M	OL	Jr.	
Earl Campbell Tyler Rose Award	Eli Stowers	Vanderbilt	TE	Gr.	
Earl Campbell Tyler Rose Award	Sedrick Alexander	Vanderbilt	RB	Jr.	
Shaun Alexander Freshman of the Year Award	Dijon Lee Jr.	Alabama	CB	Fr.	
Shaun Alexander Freshman of the Year Award	Michael Carroll	Alabama	OL	Fr.	
Shaun Alexander Freshman of the Year Award	Dallas Wilson	Florida	WR	Fr.	
Shaun Alexander Freshman of the Year Award	Elijah Griffin	Georgia	DT	Fr.	
Shaun Alexander Freshman of the Year Award	DJ Pickett	LSU	CB	Fr.	
Shaun Alexander Freshman of the Year Award	Harlem Berry	LSU	RB	Fr.	
Shaun Alexander Freshman of the Year Award	Michael Fasusi	Oklahoma	OT	Fr.	
Shaun Alexander Freshman of the Year Award	David Sanders Jr.	Tennessee	OT	Fr.	
Shaun Alexander Freshman of the Year Award	Kaliq Lockett	Texas	WR	Fr.	
Shaun Alexander Freshman of the Year Award	Justus Terry	Texas	DL	Fr.	

==== Preseason All-SEC ====
===== Media =====
First Team

Position	Player	Class	Team
First Team offense
QB	LaNorris Sellers	R-So.	South Carolina
RB	Quintrevion Wisner	Jr.	Texas
RB	Le'Veon Moss	Sr.	Texas A&M
WR	Ryan Coleman-Williams	So.	Alabama
WR	Cam Coleman	So.	Auburn
TE	Eli Stowers	Gr.	Vanderbilt
OL	Kadyn Proctor	Jr.	Alabama
OL	Cayden Green	Jr.	Missouri
OL	DJ Campbell	Sr.	Texas
OL	Austin Barber	Jr.	Florida
OL	Jake Slaughter	R-Sr.	Florida
First Team defense
DL	Keldric Faulk	Jr.	Auburn
DL	Dylan Stewart	So.	South Carolina
DL	Colin Simmons	So.	Texas
DL	Christen Miller	R-Jr.	Georgia
DB	KJ Bolden	So.	Georgia
DB	Daylen Everette	Sr.	Georgia
DB	Michael Taaffe	Sr.	Texas
DB	Jermod McCoy	Jr.	Tennessee
LB	CJ Allen	Jr.	Georgia
LB	Whit Weeks	Jr.	LSU
LB	Anthony Hill Jr.	Jr.	Texas
First Team Special Teams
PK	Peyton Woodring	Jr.	Georgia
P	Brett Thorson	Sr.	Georgia
LS	Beau Gardner	Gr.	Georgia
KS	Peyton Woodring	Jr.	Georgia
RS	Zachariah Branch	Jr.	Georgia
AP	Zachariah Branch	Jr.	Georgia

Second Team

Position	Player	Class	Team
Second Team offense
QB	Garrett Nussmeier	R-Sr.	LSU
RB	Jaydn Ott	Sr.	Oklahoma
RB	Caden Durham	So.	LSU
WR	Aaron Anderson	R-Jr.	LSU
WR	Ryan Wingo	So.	Texas
TE	Oscar Delp	Sr.	Georgia
OL	Ar'maj Reed-Adams	Sr.	Texas A&M
OL	Trey Zuhn III	Gr.	Texas A&M
OL	Jaeden Roberts	R-Sr.	Alabama
OL	Parker Brailsford	R-Jr.	Alabama
OL	Fernando Carmona Jr.	R-Sr.	Arkansas
Second Team defense
DL	Caleb Banks	R-Sr.	Florida
DL	Tim Keenan III	R-Sr.	Alabama
DL	LT Overton	Sr.	Alabama
DL	R Mason Thomas	Sr.	Oklahoma
LB	Deontae Lawson	R-Sr.	Alabama
LB	Harold Perkins	R-Jr.	LSU
LB	Suntarine Perkins	Jr.	Ole Miss
DB	Malik Muhammad	Jr.	Texas
DB	Domani Jackson	Sr.	Alabama
DB	Will Lee III	Sr.	Texas A&M
DB	Jalon Kilgore	Jr.	South Carolina
Second Team Special Teams
PK	Trey Smack	Sr.	Florida
PK	Lucas Carneiro	Jr.	Ole Miss
P	Jack Bouwmeester	Sr.	Texas
LS	Rocco Underwood	R-Sr.	Florida
KS	Trey Smack	Sr.	Florida
RS	Barion Brown	Sr.	LSU
AP	Zavion Thomas	Sr.	LSU

Third Team

Position	Player	Class	Team
Third Team offense
QB	Arch Manning	So.	Texas
RB	Nate Frazier	So.	Georgia
RB	Jam Miller	Sr.	Alabama
WR	Eric Singleton Jr.	Jr.	Auburn
WR	Kevin Coleman Jr.	Sr.	Missouri
TE	Jack Endries	Jr.	Texas
OL	Earnest Greene III	R-Jr.	Georgia
OL	Chase Bisontis	Jr.	Texas A&M
OL	Xavier Chaplin	Jr.	Auburn
OL	Connor Lew	Jr.	Auburn
OL	Trevor Goosby	So.	Texas
Third Team defense
DL	Tyreak Sapp	R-Sr.	Florida
DL	Trey Moore	Sr.	Texas
DL	Cam Ball	R-Sr.	Arkansas
DL	Zxavian Harris	Sr.	Ole Miss
LB	Taurean York	Jr.	Texas A&M
LB	Arion Carter	Jr.	Tennessee
LB	Princewill Umanmielen	Jr.	Ole Miss
DB	Keon Sabb	R-Jr.	Alabama
DB	Bray Hubbard	Jr.	Alabama
DB	Boo Carter	So.	Tennessee
DB	Isaac Smith	Jr.	Mississippi State
Third Team Special Teams
PK	Alex McPherson	Jr.	Auburn
P	Devin Bale	R-Sr.	Arkansas
P	Aidan Laros	Sr.	Kentucky
LS	Ben Anderson	R-Jr.	Oklahoma
KS	Will Stone	Sr.	Texas
RS	Zavion Thomas	Sr.	LSU
AP	Eugene Wilson III	R-So.	Florida
AP	Jadan Baugh	So.	Florida

===== Coaches =====
First Team

Position	Player	Class	Team
First Team offense
QB	Garrett Nussmeier	R-Sr.	LSU
RB	Quintrevion Wisner	Jr.	Texas
RB	Le'Veon Moss	Sr.	Texas A&M
WR	Ryan Coleman-Williams	So.	Alabama
WR	Cam Coleman	So.	Auburn
TE	Eli Stowers	Gr.	Vanderbilt
OL	Kadyn Proctor	Jr.	Alabama
OL	Cayden Green	Jr.	Missouri
OL	DJ Campbell	Sr.	Texas
OL	Fernando Carmona Jr.	R-Sr.	Arkansas
OL	Austin Barber	Jr.	Florida
OL	Jake Slaughter	R-Sr.	Florida
First Team defense
DL	Keldric Faulk	Jr.	Auburn
DL	Dylan Stewart	So.	South Carolina
DL	Colin Simmons	So.	Texas
DL	Christen Miller	R-Jr.	Georgia
DB	KJ Bolden	So.	Georgia
DB	Daylen Everette	Sr.	Georgia
DB	Michael Taaffe	Sr.	Texas
DB	Jermod McCoy	Jr.	Tennessee
LB	CJ Allen	Jr.	Georgia
LB	Whit Weeks	Jr.	LSU
LB	Anthony Hill Jr.	Jr.	Texas
First Team Special Teams
PK	Peyton Woodring	Jr.	Georgia
P	Brett Thorson	Sr.	Georgia
LS	Beau Gardner	Gr.	Georgia
KS	Peyton Woodring	Jr.	Georgia
RS	Zachariah Branch	Jr.	Georgia
AP	Barion Brown	Sr.	LSU

Second Team

Position	Player	Class	Team
Second Team offense
QB	LaNorris Sellers	R-So.	South Carolina
RB	Jaydn Ott	Sr.	Oklahoma
RB	Caden Durham	So.	LSU
WR	Aaron Anderson	R-Jr.	LSU
WR	Eric Singleton Jr.	Jr.	Auburn
WR	Kevin Coleman Jr.	Sr.	Missouri
TE	Oscar Delp	Sr.	Georgia
OL	Ar'maj Reed-Adams	Sr.	Texas A&M
OL	Trey Zuhn III	Gr.	Texas A&M
OL	Chase Bisontis	Jr.	Texas A&M
OL	Jaeden Roberts	R-Sr.	Alabama
OL	Parker Brailsford	R-Jr.	Alabama
Second Team defense
DL	Caleb Banks	R-Sr.	Florida
DL	Tim Keenan III	R-Sr.	Alabama
DL	LT Overton	Sr.	Alabama
DL	R Mason Thomas	Sr.	Oklahoma
LB	Deontae Lawson	R-Sr.	Alabama
LB	Harold Perkins	R-Jr.	LSU
LB	Suntarine Perkins	Jr.	Ole Miss
DB	Malik Muhammad	Jr.	Texas
DB	Keon Sabb	R-Jr.	Alabama
DB	Domani Jackson	Sr.	Alabama
DB	Will Lee III	Sr.	Texas A&M
DB	Jalon Kilgore	Jr.	South Carolina
Second Team Special Teams
PK	Trey Smack	Sr.	Florida
P	Jack Bouwmeester	Sr.	Texas
LS	Rocco Underwood	R-Sr.	Florida
KS	Trey Smack	Sr.	Florida
RS	Zachariah Branch	Jr.	Georgia
AP	Zavion Thomas	Sr.	LSU

Third Team

Position	Player	Class	Team
Third Team offense
QB	DJ Lagway	So.	Florida
RB	Nate Frazier	So.	Georgia
RB	Jam Miller	Sr.	Alabama
WR	Zachariah Branch	Jr.	Georgia
WR	Chris Brazzell II	R-Jr.	Tennessee
WR	Eugene Wilson III	R-So.	Florida
TE	Miles Kitselman	Sr.	Tennessee
OL	Earnest Greene III	R-Jr.	Georgia
OL	Xavier Chaplin	Jr.	Auburn
OL	Connor Lew	Jr.	Auburn
OL	Lance Heard	Jr.	Tennessee
OL	Joshua Braun	Gr.	Kentucky
OL	Trevor Goosby	So.	Texas
Third Team defense
DL	Tyreak Sapp	R-Sr.	Florida
DL	Trey Moore	Sr.	Texas
DL	Cam Ball	R-Sr.	Arkansas
DL	Zxavian Harris	Sr.	Ole Miss
LB	Taurean York	Jr.	Texas A&M
LB	Arion Carter	Jr.	Tennessee
LB	Princewill Umanmielen	Jr.	Ole Miss
DB	Bray Hubbard	Jr.	Alabama
DB	Boo Carter	So.	Tennessee
DB	Isaac Smith	Jr.	Mississippi State
DB	Jalen Catalon	Sr.	Missouri Tigers
Third Team Special Teams
PK	Alex McPherson	Jr.	Auburn
PK	Lucas Carneiro	Jr.	Ole Miss
P	Aidan Laros	Sr.	Kentucky
LS	Ben Anderson	R-Jr.	Oklahoma
KS	Will Stone	Sr.	Texas
RS	Zavion Thomas	Sr.	LSU
AP	Martel Hight	Jr.	Vanderbilt

== Head coaches ==
=== Coaches ===
Note: All stats current through the completion of the 2025 season. All records are at Division I schools only.

Team	Head coach	Year at school	Overall record	Record at school	SEC record	Conference Championships	National Championships
Alabama	Kalen DeBoer	2	113–16	9–4	5–3	0	0
Arkansas	Sam Pittman	6	30–31	30–31	14–28	0	0
Auburn	Hugh Freeze	3	87–61	11–14	5–11	0	0
Florida	Billy Napier	4	59–31	19–19	10–14	0	0
Georgia	Kirby Smart	10	105–19	105–19	62–11	3	2
Kentucky	Mark Stoops	13	77–73*	77–73*	33–62	0	0
LSU	Brian Kelly	4	292–107–2	29–11	17–7	0	0
Mississippi State	Jeff Lebby	2	2–10	2–10	0–8	0	0
Missouri	Eliah Drinkwitz	6	50–25	38–24	22–20	0	0
Oklahoma	Brent Venables	4	22–17	22–17	12–14	0	0
Ole Miss	Lane Kiffin	6	105–52	44–18	25–16	0	0
South Carolina	Shane Beamer	5	29–22	29–22	15–17	0	0
Tennessee	Josh Heupel	5	65–23	37–15	20–12	0	0
Texas	Steve Sarkisian	5	84–52	38–17	24–11	0	0
Texas A&M	Mike Elko	2	24–14	8–5	5–3	0	0
Vanderbilt	Clark Lea	5	16–33	16–33	5–27	0	0

× – Kentucky: Team was required to vacate 10 wins due to playing ineligible players

== Schedules ==
The schedule was released on December 11, 2024. The season began on August 29, 2025, and ended with the SEC Championship Game on December 6, 2025.

Index to colors and formatting
SEC member won
SEC member lost
SEC teams in **bold**

All times Central time.

† denotes Homecoming game

Rankings reflect those of the AP poll for weeks 1 through 8. Rankings from Week 9 until the end of the season reflect those of the College Football Playoff Rankings.

=== Week One ===
Date	Time	Visiting team	Home team	Site	TV	Result	Attendance	Ref.
August 28	7:30 p.m.	Central Arkansas	**Missouri**	Faurot Field • Columbia, MO	SECN	**W** 61–6	57,321	
August 29	8:00 p.m.	**Auburn**	Baylor	McLane Stadium • Waco, TX	FOX	**W** 38–24	45,233	
August 30	12:00 p.m.	**Mississippi State**	Southern Miss	M. M. Roberts Stadium • Hattiesburg, MS	ESPN	**W** 34–17	33,485	
August 30	12:00 p.m.	Syracuse	No. 24 **Tennessee**	Mercedes–Benz Stadium • Atlanta, GA (Aflac Kickoff Game)	ABC	**W** 45–26	45,918	
August 30	12:00 p.m.	No. 1 **Texas**	No. 3 Ohio State	Ohio Stadium • Columbus, OH (College GameDay/Big Noon Kickoff)	FOX	**L** 7–14	107,524	
August 30	12:45 p.m.	Toledo	**Kentucky**	Kroger Field • Lexington, KY	SECN	**W** 24–16	56,457	
August 30	3:30 p.m.	No. 8 **Alabama**	Florida State	Doak Campbell Stadium • Tallahassee, FL	ABC	**L** 17–31	67,277	
August 30	3:30 p.m.	Marshall	No. 5 **Georgia**	Sanford Stadium • Athens, GA	ESPN	**W** 45–7	93,033	
August 30	4:15 p.m.	Alabama A&M	**Arkansas**	Donald W. Reynolds Razorback Stadium • Fayetteville, AR	SECN	**W** 52–7	70,827	
August 30	6:00 p.m.	No. 6 (FCS) Illinois State	No. 18 **Oklahoma**	Gaylord Family Oklahoma Memorial Stadium • Norman, OK	ESPN+/SECN+	**W** 35–3	83,218	
August 30	7:00 p.m.	UTSA	No. 19 **Texas A&M**	Kyle Field • College Station, TX	ESPN	**W** 42–24	107,521	
August 30	7:00 p.m.	Long Island	No. 15 **Florida**	Ben Hill Griffin Stadium • Gainesville, FL	ESPN+/SECN+	**W** 55–0	89,451	
August 30	7:00 p.m.	Charleston Southern	**Vanderbilt**	FirstBank Stadium • Nashville, TN	ESPN+/SECN+	**W** 45–3	35,000	
August 30	7:30 p.m.	No. 9 **LSU**	No. 4 Clemson	Memorial Stadium • Clemson, SC	ABC	**W** 17–10	81,500	
August 30	7:45 p.m.	Georgia State	No. 21 **Ole Miss**	Vaught–Hemingway Stadium • Oxford, MS	SECN	**W** 63–7	66,378	
August 31	3:00 p.m.	Virginia Tech	No. 13 **South Carolina**	Mercedes–Benz Stadium • Atlanta, GA (Aflac Kickoff Game)	ESPN	**W** 24–11	55,531	
^{#}Rankings from AP Poll. All times are in Eastern Time.

=== Week Two ===
Date	Time	Visiting team	Home team	Site	TV	Result	Attendance	Ref.
September 6	12:00 p.m.	San Jose State	No. 7 **Texas**	Darrell K Royal–Texas Memorial Stadium • Austin, TX	ABC	**W** 38–7	100,841	
September 6	12:45 p.m.	Utah State	No. 19 **Texas A&M**	Kyle Field • College Station, TX	SECN	**W** 44–22	100,026	
September 6	3:30 p.m.	No. 20 **Ole Miss**	**Kentucky**	Kroger Field • Lexington, KY	ABC	**MISS** 30–23	58,346	
September 6	3:30 p.m.	Kansas	**Missouri**	Faurot Field • Columbia, MO (Border War)	ESPN2	**W** 42–31	57,321	
September 6	3:30 p.m.	Austin Peay	No. 4 **Georgia**	Sanford Stadium • Athens, GA	ESPN+/SECN+	**W** 28–6	93,033	
September 6	3:30 p.m.	East Tennessee State	No. 22 **Tennessee**	Neyland Stadium • Knoxville, TN	ESPN+/SECN+	**W** 72–17	101,915	
September 6	4:15 p.m.	South Florida	No. 13 **Florida**	Ben Hill Griffin Stadium • Gainesville, FL	SECN	**L** 16–18	89,909	
September 6	5:00 p.m.	Arkansas State	**Arkansas**	War Memorial Stadium • Little Rock, AR	ESPN+/SECN+	**W** 56–14	54,224	
September 6	5:00 p.m.	South Carolina State	No. 10 **South Carolina**	Williams-Brice Stadium • Columbia, SC	ESPN+/SECN+	**W** 38–10	79,705	
September 6	7:30 p.m.	No. 12 Arizona State	**Mississippi State**	Davis Wade Stadium • Starkville, MS	ESPN2	**W** 24–20	50,808	
September 6	7:30 p.m.	No. 15 Michigan	No. 18 **Oklahoma**	Gaylord Family Oklahoma Memorial Stadium • Norman, OK	ABC	**W** 24–13	84,107	
September 6	7:30 p.m.	Ball State	**Auburn**	Jordan Hare Stadium • Auburn, AL	ESPNU	**W** 42–3	88,043	
September 6	7:30 p.m.	Louisiana Tech	No. 3 **LSU**	Tiger Stadium • Baton Rouge, LA	ESPN+/SECN+	**W** 23–7	101,667	
September 6	7:30 p.m.	**Vanderbilt**	Virginia Tech	Lane Stadium • Blacksburg, VA	ACCN	**W** 44–20	65,632	
September 6	7:45 p.m.	Louisiana-Monroe	No. 21 **Alabama**	Bryant–Denny Stadium • Tuscaloosa, AL	SECN	**W** 73–0	100,077	
^{#}Rankings from AP Poll. All times are in Eastern Time.

=== Week Three ===
Date	Time	Visiting team	Home team	Site	TV	Result	Attendance	Ref.
September 13	12:00 p.m.	Wisconsin	No. 19 **Alabama**	Bryant–Denny Stadium • Tuscaloosa, AL	ABC	**W** 38–14	100,077	
September 13	12:00 p.m.	No. 13 **Oklahoma**	Temple	Lincoln Financial Field • Philadelphia, PA	ESPN2	**W** 42–3	24,927	
September 13	12:45 p.m.	South Alabama	No. 24 **Auburn**	Jordan Hare Stadium • Auburn, AL	SECN	**W** 31–15	88,043	
September 13	3:30 p.m.	No. 6 **Georgia**	No. 15 **Tennessee**	Neyland Stadium • Knoxville, TN (rivalry)	ABC	**UGA** 44–41 ^{OT}	101,915	
September 13	4:00 p.m.	Louisiana	No. 25 **Missouri**	Faurot Field • Columbia, MO	ESPN+/SECN+	**W** 52–10	57,321	
September 13	4:15 p.m.	UTEP	No. 7 **Texas**	Darrell K Royal–Texas Memorial Stadium • Austin, TX	SECN	**W** 27–10	102,025	
September 13	6:00 p.m.	Alcorn State	**Mississippi State**	Davis Wade Stadium • Starkville, MS	ESPN+/SECN+	**W** 63–0	49,158	
September 13	7:00 p.m.	**Arkansas**	No. 17 **Ole Miss**	Vaught–Hemingway Stadium • Oxford, MS (rivalry)	ESPN	**MISS** 41–35	65,068	
September 13	7:30 p.m.	Eastern Michigan	**Kentucky**	Kroger Field • Lexington, KY	ESPNU	**W** 48–23	58,489	
September 13	7:30 p.m.	**Florida**	No. 3 **LSU**	Tiger Stadium • Baton Rouge, LA (rivalry)	ABC	**LSU** 20–10	102,158	
September 13	7:30 p.m.	No. 16 **Texas A&M**	No. 8 Notre Dame	Notre Dame Stadium • Notre Dame, IN	NBC	**W** 41–40	77,622	
September 13	7:45 p.m.	**Vanderbilt**	No. 11 **South Carolina**	Williams-Brice Stadium • Columbia, SC	SECN	**VAN** 31–7	79,873	
^{#}Rankings from AP Poll. All times are in Eastern Time.

=== Week Four ===
Date	Time	Visiting team	Home team	Site	TV	Result	Attendance	Ref.
September 20	12:00 p.m.	**Arkansas**	Memphis	Simmons Bank Liberty Stadium • Memphis, TN	ABC	**L** 31–32	39,861	
September 20	12:45 p.m.	UAB	No. 15 **Tennessee**	Neyland Stadium • Knoxville, TN	SECN	**W** 56–24	101,915	
September 20	3:30 p.m.	Tulane	No. 13 **Ole Miss**	Vaught–Hemingway Stadium • Oxford, MS (rivalry)	ESPN	**W** 45–10	65,644	
September 20	3:30 p.m.	No. 22 **Auburn**	No. 11 **Oklahoma**	Gaylord Family Oklahoma Memorial Stadium • Norman, OK	ABC	**OU** 24–17	83,639	
September 20	4:15 p.m.	Northern Illinois	**Mississippi State**	Davis Wade Stadium • Starkville, MS	SECN	**W** 38–10	45,803	
September 20	7:00 p.m.	**South Carolina**	No. 23 **Missouri**	Faurot Field • Columbia, MO	ESPN	**MIZ** 29–20	57,321	
September 20	7:30 p.m.	**Florida**	No. 4 Miami	Hard Rock Stadium • Miami Gardens, FL (rivalry)	ABC	**L** 7–26	66,713	
September 20	7:30 p.m.	Georgia State	No. 20 **Vanderbilt**	FirstBank Stadium • Nashville, TN	ESPNU	**W** 70–21	35,000	
September 20	7:45 p.m.	Southeastern Louisiana	No. 3 **LSU**	Tiger Stadium • Baton Rouge, LA	SECN	**W** 56–10	102,219	
September 20	8:00 p.m.	Sam Houston	No. 8 **Texas**	Darrell K Royal–Texas Memorial Stadium • Austin, TX	ESPN+/SECN+	**W** 55–0	103,003	
^{#}Rankings from AP Poll. All times are in Eastern Time.

Date	Bye week			
September 20	No. 14 **Alabama**	No. 5 **Georgia**	**Kentucky**	No. 10 **Texas A&M**

=== Week Five ===
Date	Time	Visiting team	Home team	Site	TV	Result	Attendance	Ref.
September 27	12:00 p.m.	No. 22 Notre Dame	**Arkansas**	Donald W. Reynolds Razorback Stadium • Fayetteville, AR	ABC	**L** 13–56	75,111	
September 27	12:45 p.m.	Utah State	No. 18 **Vanderbilt**	FirstBank Stadium • Nashville, TN	SECN	**W** 55–35	33,688	
September 27	3:30 p.m.	**Auburn**	No. 9 **Texas A&M**	Kyle Field • College Station, TX	ESPN	**TAMU** 16–10	108,449	
September 27	3:30 p.m.	No. 4 **LSU**	No. 13 **Ole Miss**	Vaught–Hemingway Stadium • Oxford, MS (Magnolia Bowl)	ABC	**MISS** 24–19	67,737	
September 27	4:15 p.m.	No. 15 **Tennessee**	**Mississippi State**	Davis Wade Stadium • Starkville, MS	SECN	**TENN** 41–34 ^{OT}	60,417	
September 27	7:30 p.m.	No. 17 **Alabama**	No. 5 **Georgia**	Sanford Stadium • Athens, GA (rivalry)	ABC	**ALA** 24–21	93,033	
September 27	7:30 p.m.	UMass	No. 20 **Missouri**	Faurot Field • Columbia, MO	ESPNU	**W** 42–6	57,321	
September 27	7:45 p.m.	**Kentucky**	**South Carolina**	Williams-Brice Stadium • Columbia, MO	SECN	**SC** 35–13	79,266	
^{#}Rankings from AP Poll. All times are in Eastern Time.

Date	Bye week		
September 27	**Florida**	No. 7 **Oklahoma**	No. 10 **Texas**

=== Week Six ===
Date	Time	Visiting team	Home team	Site	TV	Result	Attendance	Ref.
October 4	12:00 p.m.	**Kentucky**	No. 12 **Georgia**	Sanford Stadium • Athens, GA	ABC	**UGA** 35–14	93,033	
October 4	3:30 p.m.	No. 16 **Vanderbilt**	No. 10 **Alabama**	Bryant-Denny Stadium • Tuscaloosa, AL	ABC	**ALA** 30–14	100,077	
October 4	3:30 p.m.	No. 9 **Texas**	**Florida**	Ben Hill Griffin Stadium • Gainesville, FL	ESPN	**FLA** 29–21	90,714	
October 4	4:00 p.m.	Kent State	No. 5 **Oklahoma**	Gaylord Family Oklahoma Memorial Stadium • Norman, OK	SECN	**W** 44–0	83,016	
October 4	7:30 p.m.	**Mississippi State**	No. 6 **Texas A&M**	Kyle Field • College Station, TX	SECN	**TAMU** 31–9	108,572	
^{#}Rankings from AP Poll. All times are in Eastern Time.

Date	Bye week						
October 4	**Arkansas**	**Auburn**	No. 13 **LSU**	No. 19 **Missouri**	No. 4 **Ole Miss**	**South Carolina**	No. 15 **Tennessee**

=== Week Seven ===
Date	Time	Visiting team	Home team	Site	TV	Result	Attendance	Ref.
October 11	12:00 p.m.	No. 8 **Alabama**	No. 14 **Missouri**	Faurot Field • Columbia, MO	ABC	**ALA** 27–24	57,321	
October 11	12:45 p.m.	Washington State	No. 4 **Ole Miss**	Vaught–Hemingway Stadium • Oxford, MS	SECN	**W** 24–21	66,392	
October 11	3:30 p.m.	No. 6 **Oklahoma**	**Texas**	Cotton Bowl • Dallas, TX (Red River Showdown)	ABC	**TEX** 23–6	92,100	
October 11	4:15 p.m.	**Arkansas**	No. 12 **Tennessee**	Neyland Stadium • Knoxville, TN	SECN	**TENN** 34–31	101,915	
October 11	7:00 p.m.	**Florida**	No. 5 **Texas A&M**	Kyle Field • College Station, TX	ESPN	**TAMU** 34–17	105,086	
October 11	7:30 p.m.	No. 10 **Georgia**	**Auburn**	Jordan Hare Stadium • Auburn, AL (Deep South's Oldest Rivalry)	ABC	**UGA** 20–10	88,043	
October 11	7:45 p.m.	**South Carolina**	No. 11 **LSU**	Tiger Stadium • Baton Rouge, LA	SECN	**LSU** 20–10	101,921	
^{#}Rankings from AP Poll. All times are in Eastern Time.

Date	Bye week		
October 12	**Kentucky**	**Mississippi State**	No. 20 **Vanderbilt**

=== Week Eight ===
Date	Time	Visiting team	Home team	Site	TV	Result	Attendance	Ref.
October 18	12:00 p.m.	No. 10 **LSU**	No. 17 **Vanderbilt**	FirstBank Stadium • Nashville, TN	ABC	**VAN** 31–24	35,000	
October 18	12:45 p.m.	No. 14 **Oklahoma**	**South Carolina**	Williams-Brice Stadium • Columbia, SC	SECN	**OU** 26–7	78,680	
October 18	3:30 p.m.	No. 5 **Ole Miss**	No. 9 **Georgia**	Sanford Stadium • Athens, GA	ABC	**UGA** 43–35	93,033	
October 18	3:30 p.m.	No. 4 **Texas A&M**	**Arkansas**	Donald W. Reynolds Razorback Stadium • Fayetteville, AR (rivalry)	ESPN	**TAMU** 45–42	73,845	
October 18	4:15 p.m.	**Mississippi State**	**Florida**	Ben Hill Griffin Stadium • Gainesville, FL	SECN	**FLA** 23–21	90,203	
October 18	7:00 p.m.	No. 21 **Texas**	**Kentucky**	Kroger Field • Lexington, KY	ESPN	**TEX** 16–13 ^{OT}	60,937	
October 18	7:30 p.m.	No. 11 **Tennessee**	No. 6 **Alabama**	Bryant Denny Stadium • Tuscaloosa, AL (Third Saturday in October)	ABC	**ALA** 37–20	100,077	
October 18	7:45 p.m.	No. 16 **Missouri**	**Auburn**	Jordan Hare Stadium • Auburn, AL	SECN	**MIZ** 23–17 ^{2OT}	87,798	
^{#}Rankings from AP Poll. All times are in Eastern Time.

=== Week Nine ===
Date	Time	Visiting team	Home team	Site	TV	Result	Attendance	Ref.
October 25	12:00 p.m.	No. 8 **Ole Miss**	No. 13 **Oklahoma**	Gaylord Family Oklahoma Memorial Stadium • Norman, OK	ABC	**MISS** 34–26	83,468	
October 25	12:45 p.m.	**Auburn**	**Arkansas**	Donald W. Reynolds Razorback Stadium • Fayetteville, AR	SECN	**AUB** 33–24	68,922	
October 25	3:30 p.m.	No. 4 **Alabama**	**South Carolina**	Williams-Brice Stadium • Columbia, SC	ABC	**ALA** 29–22	79,537	
October 25	3:30 p.m.	No. 15 **Missouri**	No. 10 **Vanderbilt**	FirstBank Stadium • Nashville, TN (College GameDay)	ESPN	**VAN** 17–10	35,000	
October 25	4:15 p.m.	No. 22 **Texas**	**Mississippi State**	Davis Wade Stadium • Starkville, MS	SECN	**TEX** 45–38 ^{OT}	52,680	
October 25	7:30 p.m.	No. 3 **Texas A&M**	No. 20 **LSU**	Tiger Stadium • Baton Rouge, LA (rivalry)	ABC	**TAMU** 49–25	101,924	
October 25	7:45 p.m.	No. 17 **Tennessee**	**Kentucky**	Kroger Field • Lexington, KY (rivalry)	SECN	**TENN** 56–34	60,153	
^{#}Rankings from AP Poll. All times are in Eastern Time.

Date	Bye week	
October 25	**Florida**	No. 5 **Georgia**

=== Week Ten ===
Date	Time	Visiting team	Home team	Site	TV	Result	Attendance	Ref.
November 1	12:00 p.m.	No. 9 **Vanderbilt**	No. 20 **Texas**	Darrell K Royal–Texas Memorial Stadium • Austin, TX	ABC	**TEX** 34–31	102,338	
November 1	3:30 p.m.	No. 5 **Georgia**	**Florida**	EverBank Stadium • Jacksonville, FL (rivalry)	ABC	**UGA** 24–20	76,131	
November 1	4:00 p.m.	**Mississippi State**	**Arkansas**	Donald W. Reynolds Razorback Stadium • Fayetteville, AR	SECN	**MSST** 38–35	68,358	
November 1	7:00 p.m.	**South Carolina**	No. 7 **Ole Miss**	Vaught–Hemingway Stadium • Oxford, MS	ESPN	**MISS** 30–14	67,491	
November 1	7:30 p.m.	No. 18 **Oklahoma**	No. 14 **Tennessee**	Neyland Stadium • Knoxville, TN	ABC	**OU** 33–27	101,915	
November 1	7:30 p.m.	**Kentucky**	**Auburn**	Jordan–Hare Stadium • Auburn, AL	SECN	**UK** 10–3	88,043	
^{#}Rankings from AP Poll. All times are in Eastern Time.

Date	Bye week			
November 1	No. 4 **Alabama**	**LSU**	No. 19 **Missouri**	No. 3 **Texas A&M**

=== Week Eleven ===
Date	Time	Visiting team	Home team	Site	TV	Result	Attendance	Ref.
November 8	12:00 p.m.	No. 5 **Georgia**	**Mississippi State**	Davis Wade Stadium • Starkville, MS	ESPN	**UGA** 41–21	53,017	
November 8	1:00 p.m.	The Citadel	No. 6 **Ole Miss**	Vaught–Hemingway Stadium • Oxford, MS	ESPN+/SECN+	**W** 49–0	67,326	
November 8	3:30 p.m.	No. 3 **Texas A&M**	No. 22 **Missouri**	Faurot Field • Columbia, MO	ABC	**TAMU** 38–17	57,321	
November 8	4:00 p.m.	**Auburn**	No. 16 **Vanderbilt**	FirstBank Stadium • Nashville, TN	SECN	**VAN** 45–38 ^{OT}	35,000	
November 8	7:30 p.m.	**LSU**	No. 4 **Alabama**	Bryant Denny Stadium • Tuscaloosa, AL (First Saturday in November)	ABC	**ALA** 20–9	100,077	
November 8	7:30 p.m.	**Florida**	**Kentucky**	Kroger Field • Lexington, KY (rivalry)	SECN	**UK** 38–7	56,388	
^{#}Rankings from College Football Playoff. All times are in Eastern Time.

Date	Bye week				
November 8	**Arkansas**	No. 12 **Oklahoma**	**South Carolina**	No. 25 **Tennessee**	No. 11 **Texas**

=== Week Twelve ===
Date	Time	Visiting team	Home team	Site	TV	Result	Attendance	Ref.
November 15	12:00 p.m.	**South Carolina**	No. 3 **Texas A&M**	Kyle Field • College Station, TX	ESPN	**TAMU** 31–30	108,582	
November 15	12:45 p.m.	**Arkansas**	**LSU**	Tiger Stadium • Baton Rouge, LA (Battle for the Golden Boot)	SECN	**LSU** 23–22	100,212	
November 15	1:30 p.m.	No. 5 (FCS) Tennessee Tech	**Kentucky**	Kroger Field • Lexington, KY	ESPN+/SECN+	**W** 42–10	53,686	
November 15	3:30 p.m.	No. 11 **Oklahoma**	No. 4 **Alabama**	Bryant–Denny Stadium • Tuscaloosa, AL	ABC	**OU** 23–21	100,077	
November 15	4:15 p.m.	New Mexico State	No. 23 **Tennessee**	Neyland Stadium • Knoxville, TN	SECN	**W** 42–9	101,915	
November 15	7:00 p.m.	**Florida**	No. 7 **Ole Miss**	Vaught–Hemingway Stadium • Oxford, MS	ESPN	**MISS** 34–24	68,138	
November 15	7:30 p.m.	No. 10 **Texas**	No. 5 **Georgia**	Sanford Stadium • Athens, GA	ABC	**UGA** 35–10	93,033	
November 15	7:45 p.m.	**Mississippi State**	**Missouri**	Faurot Field • Columbia, MO	SECN	**MIZ** 49–27	57,321	
^{#}Rankings from College Football Playoff. All times are in Eastern Time.

Date	Bye week	
November 15	**Auburn**	No. 14 **Vanderbilt**

=== Week Thirteen ===
Date	Time	Visiting team	Home team	Site	TV	Result	Attendance	Ref.
November 22	12:00 p.m.	No. 22 **Missouri**	No. 8 **Oklahoma**	Gaylord Family Oklahoma Memorial Stadium • Norman, OK (rivalry)	ABC	**OU** 17–6	83,541	
November 22	12:00 p.m.	Samford	No. 3 **Texas A&M**	Kyle Field • College Station, TX	ESPN+/SECN+	**W** 48–0	104,877	
November 22	12:45 p.m.	Charlotte	No. 4 **Georgia**	Sanford Stadium • Athens, GA	SECN	**W** 35–3	93,033	
November 22	2:00 p.m.	Eastern Illinois	No. 10 **Alabama**	Bryant-Denny Stadium • Tuscaloosa, AL	ESPN+/SECN+	**W** 56–0	100,077	
November 22	2:00 p.m.	Mercer	**Auburn**	Jordan–Hare Stadium • Auburn, AL	ESPN+/SECN+	**W** 62–17	88,043	
November 22	3:30 p.m.	**Arkansas**	No. 17 **Texas**	Darrell K Royal–Texas Memorial Stadium • Austin, TX (rivalry)	ABC	**TEX** 52–37	102,361	
November 22	3:30 p.m.	**Kentucky**	No. 14 **Vanderbilt**	FirstBank Stadium • Nashville, TN (rivalry)	ESPN	**VAN** 45–17	35,000	
November 22	4:15 p.m.	Coastal Carolina	**South Carolina**	Williams–Brice Stadium • Columbia, SC	SECN	**W** 51–7	78,452	
November 22	7:30 p.m.	No. 20 **Tennessee**	**Florida**	Ben Hill Griffin Stadium • Gainesville, FL (rivalry)	ABC	**TENN** 31–11	90,465	
November 22	7:45 p.m.	Western Kentucky	**LSU**	Tiger Stadium • Baton Rouge, LA	SECN	**W** 13–10	100,923	
^{#}Rankings from College Football Playoff. All times are in Eastern Time.

Date	Bye week	
November 22	No. 6 **Ole Miss**	**Mississippi State**

=== Week Fourteen ===
Date	Time	Visiting team	Home team	Site	TV	Result	Attendance	Ref.
November 28	12:00 p.m.	No. 7 **Ole Miss**	**Mississippi State**	Davis Wade Stadium • Starkville, MS (Egg Bowl)	ABC	**MISS** 38–19	60,417	
November 28	3:30 p.m.	No. 4 **Georgia**	No. 23 Georgia Tech	Mercedes-Benz Stadium • Atlanta, GA (Clean, Old-Fashioned Hate)	ABC	**W** 16–9	73,728	
November 28	7:30 p.m.	No. 3 **Texas A&M**	No. 16 **Texas**	Darrell K Royal-Texas Memorial Stadium • Austin, TX (Lone Star Showdown)	ABC	**TEX** 27–17	103,632	
November 29	12:00 p.m.	Clemson	**South Carolina**	Williams-Brice Stadium • Columbia, SC (Palmetto Bowl)	SECN	**L** 14–28	79,827	
November 29	12:00 p.m.	**Kentucky**	Louisville	L&N Federal Credit Union Stadium • Louisville, KY (Governor's Cup)	ACCN	**L** 0–41	50,634	
November 29	3:30 p.m.	No. 14 **Vanderbilt**	No. 19 **Tennessee**	Neyland Stadium • Knoxville, TN (rivalry)	ESPN	**VAN** 45–21	101,915	
November 29	3:30 p.m.	**LSU**	No. 8 **Oklahoma**	Gaylord Family Oklahoma Stadium • Norman, OK	ABC	**OU** 17–13	83,734	
November 29	3:30 p.m.	**Missouri**	**Arkansas**	Donald W. Reynolds Razorback Stadium • Fayetteville, AR (Battle Line Rivalry)	SECN	**MIZ** 31–17	61,508	
November 29	4:30 p.m.	Florida State	**Florida**	Ben Hill Griffin Stadium • Gainesville, FL (Sunshine Showdown)	ESPN2	**W** 40–21	90,007	
November 29	7:30 p.m.	No. 10 **Alabama**	**Auburn**	Jordan Hare Stadium • Auburn, AL (Iron Bowl)	ABC	**ALA** 27–20	88,043	
^{#}Rankings from College Football Playoff. All times are in Eastern Time.

=== SEC Championship Game ===
Date	Time	Visiting team	Home team	Site	TV	Result	Attendance	Ref.
December 6	4:00 p.m.	No. 3 **Georgia**	No. 9 **Alabama**	Mercedes-Benz Stadium • Atlanta, GA	ABC	**UGA** 28–7	77,247	
^{#}Rankings from College Football Playoff. All times are in Eastern Time.

== Postseason ==
=== Bowl games ===
For the 2020–2025 bowl cycle, the SEC had eight appearances in the following bowls: Sugar Bowl and Peach Bowl (unless they were selected for playoffs filled by a SEC and at-large team if champion was in the playoffs), Citrus Bowl, Duke's Mayo Bowl, Gator Bowl, Liberty Bowl, Music City Bowl, ReliaQuest Bowl and Texas Bowl. The SEC teams go to a New Year's Six bowl if a team finishes higher than the champions of Power Five conferences in the final College Football Playoff rankings.

The SEC champion are also eligible for the College Football Playoff if they are among the top five conference champions in the final CFP ranking or if they are seven highest-ranked at-large selections. Additionally, four of the top five conference champions will receive first round byes for the 2025 College Football Playoff.

Legend
SEC win
SEC loss

Bowl game	Date	Site	Time (EST)	Television	SEC team	Opponent	Score	Attendance
Gator Bowl	December 27, 2025	EverBank Stadium • Jacksonville, FL	7:30 p.m.	ABC	Missouri	19 Virginia	L 7–13	31,802
Texas Bowl	December 27, 2025	NRG Stadium • Houston, TX	9:15 p.m.	ESPN	LSU	21 Houston	L 35–38	63,867
Music City Bowl	December 30, 2025	Nissan Stadium • Nashville, TN	5:30 p.m.	ESPN	Tennessee	Illinois	L 28–30	52,815
ReliaQuest Bowl	December 31, 2025	Raymond James Stadium • Tampa, FL	12:00 p.m.	ESPN	14 Vanderbilt	23 Iowa	L 27–34	35,382
Citrus Bowl	December 31, 2025	Camping World Stadium • Orlando, FL	3:00 p.m.	ABC	13 Texas	18 Michigan	W 41–27	47,316
Duke's Mayo Bowl	January 2, 2026	Bank of America Stadium • Charlotte, NC	8:00 p.m.	ESPN	Mississippi State	Wake Forest	L 29–43	29,328
College Football Playoff bowl games
College Football Playoff (first round)	December 19, 2025	Gaylord Family Oklahoma Memorial Stadium • Norman, OK	8:00 p.m.	ABC	8 Oklahoma	9 Alabama	ALA 34–24	83,550
College Football Playoff (first round)	December 20, 2025	Kyle Field • College Station, TX	12:00 p.m.	ABC	7 Texas A&M	10 Miami (FL)	L 3–10	104,122
College Football Playoff (first round)	December 20, 2025	Vaught–Hemingway Stadium • Oxford, MS	3:30 p.m.	TNT	6 Ole Miss	20 Tulane	W 41–10	68,251
Rose Bowl (quarterfinal)	January 1, 2026	Rose Bowl • Pasadena, CA	4:00 p.m.	ESPN	9 Alabama	1 Indiana	L 3–38	90,278
Sugar Bowl (quarterfinal)	January 1, 2026	Caesars Superdome • New Orleans, LA	8:00 p.m.	ESPN	3 Georgia	6 Ole Miss	MISS 39–34	68,371
Fiesta Bowl (semifinal)	January 8, 2026	State Farm Stadium • Glendale, AZ	7:30 p.m.	ESPN	6 Ole Miss	10 Miami (FL)	L 27–31	67,928

== Head to head matchups ==
2025 SEC head to head matchups
Team	Alabama	Arkansas	Auburn	Florida	Georgia	Kentucky	LSU	Missouri	Mississippi State	Oklahoma	Ole Miss	South Carolina	Tennessee	Texas	Texas A&M	Vanderbilt
vs. Alabama	—	×	20–27	×	21–24	×	9–20	24–27	×	23–21	×	22–29	20–37	×	×	14–30
vs. Arkansas	×	—	33–24	×	×	×	23–22	31–17	38–35	×	41–35	×	34–31	52–37	45–42	×
vs. Auburn	27–20	24–33	—	×	20–10	10–3	×	23–17	×	24–17	×	×	×	×	16–10	45–38
vs. Florida	×	×	×	—	24–20	38–7	20–10	×	21–23	×	34–24	×	31–11	21–29	34–17	×
vs. Georgia	24–21	×	10–20	20–24	—	14–35	×	×	21–41	×	35–43	×	41–44	10–35	×	×
vs. Kentucky	×	×	3–10	7–38	35–14	—	×	×	×	×	30–23	35–13	56–34	16–13	×	45–17
vs. LSU	20–9	22–23	×	10–20	×	×	—	×	×	17–13	24–19	10–20	×	×	49–25	31–24
vs. Missouri	27–24	17–31	17–23	×	×	×	×	—	27–49	17–6	×	20–29	×	×	38–17	17–10
vs. Mississippi State	×	35–38	×	23–21	41–21	×	×	49–27	—	×	38–19	×	41–34	45–38	31–9	×
vs. Oklahoma	21–23	×	17–24	×	×	×	13–17	6–17	×	—	34–26	7–26	27–33	23–6	×	×
vs. Ole Miss	×	35–41	×	24–34	43–35	23–30	19–24	×	19–38	26–34	—	14–30	×	×	×	×
vs. South Carolina	29–22	×	×	×	×	13–35	20–10	29–20	×	26–7	30–14	—	×	×	31–30	31–7
vs. Tennessee	37–20	31–34	×	11–31	44–41	34–56	×	×	34–41	33–27	×	×	—	×	×	45–24
vs. Texas	×	37–52	×	29–21	35–10	13–16	×	×	38–45	6–23	×	×	×	—	17–27	31–34
vs. Texas A&M	×	42–45	10–16	17–34	×	×	25–49	17–38	9–31	×	×	30–31	×	27–17	—	×
vs. Vanderbilt	30–14	×	38–45	×	×	17–45	24–31	10–17	×	×	×	7–31	24–45	34–31	×	—
Total	7–1	0–8	1–7	2–6	7–1	2–6	3–5	4–4	1–7	6–2	7–1	1–7	4–4	6–2	7–1	6–2
	ALA	ARK	AUB	FLA	UGA	UK	LSU	MIZ	MSST	OU	MISS	SC	TENN	TEX	TAMU	VAN

× – Matchup not played in 2025
Updated after the season.

== SEC vs other conferences ==
=== SEC vs Power Four matchups ===
The following games include SEC teams competing against Power Four teams from the ACC, Big Ten, Big 12, and Notre Dame. All rankings are from the AP Poll at the time of the game.

Date	Conference	Visitor	Home	Site	Score
August 29	Big 12	Auburn	Baylor	McLane Stadium • Waco, TX	W 38–24
August 30	ACC	8 Alabama	Florida State	Doak Campbell Stadium • Tallahassee, FL	L 17–31
August 30	ACC	9 LSU	4 Clemson	Memorial Stadium • Clemson, SC	W 17–10
August 30	ACC	24 Tennessee	Syracuse †	Mercedes-Benz Stadium • Atlanta, GA	W 45–26
August 30	Big Ten	1 Texas	3 Ohio State	Ohio Stadium • Columbus, OH	L 7–14
August 31	ACC	Virginia Tech	13 South Carolina†	Mercedes-Benz Stadium • Atlanta, GA	W 24–11
September 6	Big 12	12 Arizona State	Mississippi State	Davis Wade Stadium • Starkville, MS	W 24–20
September 6	Big 12	Kansas	Missouri	Faurot Field • Columbia, MO (Border War)	W 42–31
September 6	Big Ten	15 Michigan	18 Oklahoma	Gaylord Family Oklahoma Memorial Stadium • Norman, OK	W 24–13
September 6	ACC	Vanderbilt	Virginia Tech	Lane Stadium • Blacksburg, VA	W 44–20
September 13	Big Ten	Wisconsin	19 Alabama	Bryant–Denny Stadium • Tuscaloosa, AL	W 38–14
September 13	Independents	16 Texas A&M	8 Notre Dame	Notre Dame Stadium • Notre Dame, IN	W 41–40
September 20	ACC	Florida	4 Miami (FL)	Hard Rock Stadium • Miami Gardens, FL (rivalry)	L 7–26
September 27	Independents	22 Notre Dame	Arkansas	Donald W. Reynolds Razorback Stadium • Fayetteville, AR	L 13–56
November 28	ACC	4 Georgia	23 Georgia Tech†	Mercedes-Benz Stadium • Atlanta, GA (rivalry)	W 16–9
November 29	ACC	Florida State	Florida	Ben Hill Griffin Stadium • Gainesville, FL (rivalry)	W 40–21
November 29	ACC	Kentucky	Louisville	L&N Federal Credit Union Stadium • Louisville, KY (rivalry)	L 0–41
November 29	ACC	Clemson	South Carolina	Williams-Brice Stadium • Columbia, SC (rivalry)	L 14–28

Note:† Denotes neutral site game

Updated after Week 14.

=== SEC vs Group of Five matchups ===
The following games include SEC teams competing against "Group of Five" teams from the American, C-USA, MAC, Mountain West and Sun Belt.

Date	Conference	Visitor	Home	Site	Score
August 30	Sun Belt	Marshall	5 Georgia	Sanford Stadium • Athens, GA	W 45–7
August 30	MAC	Toledo	Kentucky	Kroger Field • Lexington, KY	W 24–16
August 30	Sun Belt	Georgia State	21 Ole Miss	Vaught–Hemingway Stadium • University, MS	W 63–7
August 30	Sun Belt	Mississippi State	Southern Miss	M. M. Roberts Stadium • Hattiesburg, MS	W 34–17
August 30	American	UTSA	19 Texas A&M	Kyle Field • College Station, TX	W 42–24
September 6	Sun Belt	Louisiana-Monroe	21 Alabama	Bryant-Denny Stadium• Tuscaloosa, AL	W 73–0
September 6	Sun Belt	Arkansas State	Arkansas	War Memorial Stadium • Little Rock, AR	W 56–14
September 6	MAC	Ball State	Auburn	Jordan Hare Stadium • Auburn, AL	W 42–3
September 6	American	South Florida	13 Florida	Ben Hill Griffin Stadium • Gainesville, FL	L 16–18
September 6	CUSA	Louisiana Tech	3 LSU	Tiger Stadium • Baton Rouge, LA	W 23–7
September 6	Mountain West	San Jose State	7 Texas	Darrell K Royal-Texas Memorial Stadium • Austin, TX	W 38–7
September 6	Mountain West	Utah State	19 Texas A&M	Kyle Field • College Station, TX	W 44–22
September 13	Sun Belt	South Alabama	24 Auburn	Jordan Hare Stadium • Auburn, AL	W 31–15
September 13	MAC	Eastern Michigan	Kentucky	Kroger Field • Lexington, KY	W 48–23
September 13	Sun Belt	Louisiana	25 Missouri	Faurot Field • Columbia, MO	W 52–10
September 13	American	13 Oklahoma	Temple	Lincoln Financial Field • Philadelphia, PA	W 42–3
September 13	CUSA	UTEP	7 Texas	Darrell K Royal-Texas Memorial Stadium • Austin, TX	W 27–10
September 20	American	Arkansas	Memphis	Simmons Bank Liberty Stadium • Memphis, TN	L 31–32
September 20	American	Tulane	13 Ole Miss	Vaught–Hemingway Stadium • Oxford, MS	W 45–10
September 20	MAC	Northern Illinois	Mississippi State	Davis Wade Stadium • Starkville, MS	W 38–10
September 20	American	UAB	15 Tennessee	Neyland Stadium • Knoxville, TN	W 56–24
September 20	Sun Belt	Georgia State	20 Vanderbilt	FirstBank Stadium • Nashville, TN	W 70–21
September 20	CUSA	Sam Houston	8 Texas	Darrell K Royal-Texas Memorial Stadium • Austin, TX	W 55–0
September 27	MAC	UMass	20 Missouri	Faurot Field • Columbia, MO	W 42–6
September 27	Mountain West	Utah State	18 Vanderbilt	FirstBank Stadium • Nashville, TN	W 55–35
October 4	MAC	Kent State	5 Oklahoma	Gaylord Family Oklahoma Stadium • Norman, OK	W 55–0
October 11	Pac-12	Washington State	4 Ole Miss	Vaught–Hemingway Stadium • Oxford, MS	W 24–21
November 15	CUSA	New Mexico State	23 Tennessee	Neyland Stadium • Knoxville, TN	W 42–9
November 22	American	Charlotte	Georgia	Sanford Stadium • Athens, GA	W 35–3
November 22	CUSA	Western Kentucky	LSU	Tiger Stadium • Baton Rouge, LA	W 13–10
November 22	Sun Belt	Coastal Carolina	South Carolina	Williams-Brice Stadium • Columbia, SC	W 51–7

Updated after Week 13.

=== SEC vs FCS matchups ===
The Football Championship Subdivision comprises 13 conferences and two independent programs.

Date	Conference	Visitor	Home	Site	Score
August 28	UAC	Central Arkansas	Missouri	Faurot Field • Columbia, MO	W 61–6
August 30	SWAC	Alabama A&M	Arkansas	Donald W. Reynolds Razorback Stadium • Fayetteville, AR	W 52–7
August 30	Northeast	Long Island	15 Florida	Ben Hill Griffin Stadium • Gainesville, FL	W 55–0
August 30	Missouri Valley	Illinois State	18 Oklahoma	Gaylord Family Oklahoma Stadium • Norman, OK	W 35–3
August 30	Big South-OVC	Charleston Southern	Vanderbilt	FirstBank Stadium • Nashville, TN	W 45–3
September 6	MEAC	South Carolina State	10 South Carolina	Williams-Brice Stadium • Columbia, SC	W 38–10
September 6	Southern	East Tennessee State	22 Tennessee	Neyland Stadium • Knoxville, TN	W 72–17
September 13	SWAC	Alcorn State	Mississippi State	Davis Wade Stadium • Starkville, MS	W 63–0
September 20	Southland	Southeastern Louisiana	3 LSU	Tiger Stadium • Baton Rouge, LA	W 56–10
November 8	Southern	The Citadel	6 Ole Miss	Vaught–Hemingway Stadium • Oxford, MS	W 49–0
November 15	Big South-OVC	Tennessee Tech	Kentucky	Kroger Field • Lexington, KY	W 42–10
November 22	Big South-OVC	Eastern Illinois	Alabama	Bryant-Denny Stadium • Tuscaloosa, AL	W 56–0
November 22	Southern	Mercer	Auburn	Jordan Hare Stadium • Auburn, AL	W 62–17
November 22	Southern	Samford	Texas A&M	Kyle Field • College Station, TX	W 48–0

Note: † Denotes neutral site game

Updated after Week 13.

=== SEC records against other conferences ===
2025–26 records against non-conference foes:

Regular season

Power 4 Conferences	Record
ACC	6–4
Big Ten	2–1
Big 12	3–0
Notre Dame	1–1
Power 4 total	12–6
Other FBS conferences	Record
American	5–2
CUSA	5–0
Independents (excluding Notre Dame)	0–0
MAC	6–0
Mountain West	3–0
Sun Belt	9–0
Other FBS total	28–2
FCS opponents	Record
Football Championship Subdivision	14–0
Total non-conference record	54–8

Post season

Power 4 Conferences	Record
ACC	0–4
Big Ten	1–3
Big 12	0–1
SEC	2–2
Power 4 total	3–10
Other FBS conferences	Record
American	1–0
Other FBS total	1–0
Total bowl record	4–10

== Rankings ==
		Pre	Wk 1	Wk 2	Wk 3	Wk 4	Wk 5	Wk 6	Wk 7	Wk 8	Wk 9	Wk 10	Wk 11	Wk 12	Wk 13	Wk 14	Wk 15	Final
Alabama	AP	8	21	19	14	17	10	8	6	4	4	4	4	10	10	10	11	9
Alabama	C	8	20	18	14	16	11	8	6	4	4	4	4	10	10	10	11	9
Alabama	CFP	Not released										4	4	10	10	9	9	
Arkansas	AP	—	—	—	—	—	—	—	—	—	—	—	—	—	—	—	—	—
Arkansas	C	RV	—	—	—	—	—	—	—	—	—	—	—	—	—	—	—	—
Arkansas	CFP	Not released										—	—	—	—	—	—	
Auburn	AP	RV	RV	24	22	RV	—	RV	—	—	—	—	—	—	—	—	—	—
Auburn	C	RV	RV	RV	25	RV	—	RV	—	—	—	—	—	—	—	—	—	—
Auburn	CFP	Not released										—	—	—	—	—	—	
Florida	AP	15	13	RV	—	—	—	—	—	—	—	—	—	—	—	—	—	—
Florida	C	17	15	RV	—	—	—	—	—	—	—	—	—	—	—	—	—	—
Florida	CFP	Not released										—	—	—	—	—	—	
Georgia	AP	5 (1)	4	6	5	5	12	10	9	5	5	5	5	4	4	3	2	6
Georgia	C	4 (3)	3 (1)	3	3 (1)	3 (1)	10	9	7	5	5	5	5	4	4	3	2	5
Georgia	CFP	Not released										5	5	4	4	3	3	
Kentucky	AP	—	—	—	—	—	—	—	—	—	—	—	—	—	—	—	—	—
Kentucky	C	—	—	—	—	—	—	—	—	—	—	—	—	—	—	—	—	—
Kentucky	CFP	Not released										—	—	—	—	—	—	
LSU	AP	9	3 (3)	3 (2)	3 (2)	4	13	11	10	20	RV	RV	—	—	—	—	—	—
LSU	C	9	4 (1)	4 (1)	4 (1)	4	13	11	10	19	RV	RV	—	—	—	—	—	—
LSU	CFP	Not released										—	—	—	—	—	—	
Mississippi State	AP	—	—	—	RV	RV	RV	RV	RV	—	—	—	—	—	—	—	—	—
Mississippi State	C	—	—	—	RV	RV	RV	—	—	—	—	—	—	—	—	—	—	—
Mississippi State	CFP	Not released										—	—	—	—	—	—	
Missouri	AP	RV	RV	25	23	20	19	14	16	15	19	19	RV	23	RV	25	25	RV
Missouri	C	RV	RV	RV	22	19	18	14	16	14	20	17	24	21	RV	RV	RV	RV
Missouri	CFP	Not released										22	—	22	—	—	—	
Oklahoma	AP	18	18	13	11	7	5	6	14	13	18	11	11	8	8	8	8	13
Oklahoma	C	RV	24	16	12	10	8	6	13	11	18	12	10т	8	8	8	8	10
Oklahoma	CFP	Not released										12	11	8	8	8	8	
Ole Miss	AP	21	20	17	13	13	4	4	5	8	7	7	6	5	6	6	6	3
Ole Miss	C	15	14	13	11	11	4	4	5	8	8	7	7	6	6	5	6	3
Ole Miss	CFP	Not released										6	7	6	7	6	6	
South Carolina	AP	13	10	11	RV	—	—	—	—	—	—	—	—	—	—	—	—	—
South Carolina	C	13	11	10	24	—	—	—	—	—	—	—	—	—	—	—	—	—
South Carolina	CFP	Not released										—	—	—	—	—	—	
Tennessee	AP	24	22	15	15	15	15	12	11	17	14	23	21	20	18	RV	RV	RV
Tennessee	C	18	17	15	15	15	15	12	11	17	14	22	20	20	18	24	23	RV
Tennessee	CFP	Not released										25	23	20	19	—	—	
Texas	AP	1 (25)	7	7	8	10	9	RV	21	22	20	13	10	17	16	14	14	12
Texas	C	1 (28)	6	7	7	7	7	19	17	18	19	13	10т	18	16	14	14	13
Texas	CFP	Not released										11	10	17	16	13	13	
Texas A&M	AP	19	19	16	10	9	6	5	4	3	3 (1)	3 (1)	3 (4)	3 (1)	3 (1)	7	7	8
Texas A&M	C	т21	22	17	10	9	5	5 (1)	4	3	3 (2)	3 (3)	3 (4)	3 (2)	3 (2)	7	7	8
Texas A&M	CFP	Not released										3	3	3	3	7	7	
Vanderbilt	AP	—	—	RV	20	18	16	20	17	10	9	15	13	12	12	13	13	15
Vanderbilt	C	RV	RV	RV	23	20	17	20	18	12	10	16	14	13	12	12	12	15
Vanderbilt	CFP	Not released										16	14	14	14	14	14	

Legend
	Improvement in ranking
	Drop in ranking
	No change in ranking from previous week
RV	Received votes but were not ranked in Top 25 of poll
т	Tied with team above or below also with this symbol

== Television selections ==
The Southeastern Conference has television contracts with ESPN, which allow games to be broadcast across ABC, ESPN2, ESPNU and SEC Network. Streaming broadcasts for games under SEC control are streamed on ESPN+. Games under the control of other conferences fall under the contracts of the opposing conference.

Network	Wk 1	Wk 2	Wk 3	Wk 4	Wk 5	Wk 6	Wk 7	Wk 8	Wk 9	Wk 10	Wk 11	Wk 12	Wk 13	Wk 14	C	Bowls	NCG	Totals
ABC	3	3	3	3	3	2	3	3	3	3	2	2	3	5	1	4	-	46
ESPN	4	–	1	2	1	1	1	2	1	1	1	2	1	1	–	7	–	26
ESPN2	–	2	1	–	–	–	–	–	–	–	–	–	–	1	–	–	–	4
ESPNU	–	1	1	1	1	–	–	–	–	–	–	–	–	–	–	–	–	4
FOX	2	–	–	–	–	–	–	–	–	–	–	–	–	–	–	–	–	2
FS1	–	–	–	–	–	–	–	–	–	–	–	–	–	–	–	–	–	–
FS2	–	–	–	–	–	–	–	–	–	–	–	–	–	–	–	–	–	–
CBS	–	–	–	–	–	–	–	–	–	–	–	–	–	–	–	–	–	–
NBC	–	–	1	–	–	–	–	–	–	–	–	–	–	–	–	–	–	1
The CW	–	–	–	–	–	–	–	–	–	–	–	–	–	–	–	–	–	–
CBS Sports Network	–	–	–	–	–	–	–	–	–	–	–	–	–	–	–	–	–	–
SEC Network	4	3	3	3	3	2	3	3	3	2	2	3	3	2	–	–	–	–
ESPN+ (streaming)	3	5	2	1	–	–	–	–	–	–	1	1	3	–	–	–	–	-
ACC Network	–	1	–	–	–	–	–	–	–	–	–	–	–	1	–	–	–	2

Platform	Games
Broadcast	0
Cable	0
Streaming	0

== Awards and honors ==
=== Players of the week ===
Week	Offensive Player of the Week			Defensive Player of the Week			Special Teams Player of the Week			Offensive Line Player of the Week			Defensive Line Player of the Week			Freshman Player of the Week		
Week	Player	Team	Position	Player	Team	Position	Player	Team	Position	Player	Team	Position	Player	Team	Position	Player	Team	Position
Week 1 (Sept 1)	Jackson Arnold; Garrett Nussmeier	Auburn; LSU	QB	Colton Hood; Fred Johnson	Tennessee; South Carolina	DB; LB	Rayshawn Pleasant; Vicari Swain	Auburn; South Carolina	DB/KR; DB/PR	Braelin Moore	LSU	C	Zxavian Harris; Will Whitson	Ole Miss; Mississippi State	DT	Braylon Staley	Tennessee	WR
Week 2 (Sept 8)	John Mateer	Oklahoma	QB	Nick Rinaldi; Nic Mitchell	Vanderbilt; Mississippi State	LB	Lucas Carneiro; Vicari Swain (2)	Ole Miss; South Carolina	PK; DB/PR	Albert Reese; Dominick Giudice	Mississippi State; Missouri	RT; G	Cashius Howell	Texas A&M	DE	Parker Livingstone	Texas	WR
Week 3 (Sept 15)	Gunner Stockton	Georgia	QB	Bray Hubbard; Dashawn Spears	Alabama; LSU	S	Peyton Woodring	Georgia	PK	Jordan White; Diego Pounds	Vanderbilt; Ole Miss	G OT	Albert Regis	Texas A&M	DT	Tory Blaylock	Oklahoma	RB
Week 4 (Sept 22)	Ahmad Hardy	Missouri	RB	Jaden Yates	Ole Miss	LB	Grayson Miller	Oklahoma	P	Keagen Trost	Missouri	OL	R Mason Thomas; Zion Young	Oklahoma; Missouri	DL; DE	Robert Meyer; Jamison Curtis	Missouri; Vanderbilt	PK; LB
Week 5 (Sept 29)	Ty Simpson; Trinidad Chambliss	Alabama; Ole Miss	QB	Arion Carter	Tennessee	LB	Brock Taylor	Vanderbilt	PK	Patrick Kutas; Kadyn Proctor	Ole Miss; Alabama	OL; LT	Bryan Thomas Jr. Tyre West	South Carolina; Tennessee	EDGE; DE	Oscar Bird	Ole Miss	P
Week 6 (Oct 6)	DJ Lagway	Florida	QB	Justin Jefferson; Daymion Sanford	Alabama; Texas A&M	LB	Tate Sandell; Taylor Spierto	Oklahoma; Florida	PK; WR	Parker Brailsford	Alabama	C	Cashius Howell (2)	Texas A&M	DE	Dallas Wilson	Florida	WR
Week 7 (Oct 13)	Ty Simpson (2)	Alabama	QB	Malik Muhammad	Texas	DB	Ryan Niblett; Max Gilbert	Texas; Tennessee	PR; PK	Monroe Freeling	Georgia	OL	Colin Simmons; Dayon Hayes	Texas; Texas A&M	EDGE; WR	Braylon Staley (2)	Tennessee	WR
Week 8 (Oct 20)	Diego Pavia; Gunner Stockton (2)	Vanderbilt; Georgia	QB	Yhonzae Pierre; Zabien Brown	Alabama	LB; DB	Mason Shipley	Texas	PK	Jordan White (2)	Vanderbilt	C	Colin Simmons (2); Zion Young (2)	Texas A&M; Missouri	EDGE	Tory Blaylock (2)	Oklahoma	RB
Week 9 (Oct 27)	Marcel Reed	Texas A&M	QB	Xavier Atkins; Anthony Hill Jr.	Auburn; Texas	LB	Alex McPherson	Auburn	PK	Lance Heard; Diego Pounds (2)	Tennessee; Ole Miss	OT; OL	Ethan Burke; Cashius Howell (3)	Texas; Texas A&M	EDGE; DE	Winston Watkins	Ole Miss	WR
Week 10 (Nov 3)	Arch Manning	Texas	QB	Owen Heinecke	Oklahoma	LB	Tate Sandell (2)	Oklahoma	PK	Jalen Farmer; Jayden Williams	Kentucky; Ole Miss	OG; OL	Colin Simmons (3); Kam Franklin	Texas; Ole Miss	EDGE; DE	Kamario Taylor; Cutter Boley	Mississippi State; Kentucky	QB
Week 11 (Nov 10)	Diego Pavia (2)	Vanderbilt	QB	Daveren Rayner; Daymion Sanford (2)	Kentucky; Texas A&M	LB	Peyton Woodring (2)	Georgia	PK	Jordan White (3); Parker Brailsford (2)	Vanderbilt; Alabama	C	Cashius Howell (4)	Texas A&M	DE	Cutter Boley (2)	Kentucky	QB
Week 12 (Nov 17)	Ahmad Hardy (2); Kewan Lacy	Missouri; Ole Miss	RB	Eli Bowen; Toriano Pride	Oklahoma; Missouri	CB	Damian Ramos; Tate Sandell (3)	LSU; Oklahoma	PK	Monroe Freeling (2)	Georgia	OL	Taylor Wein	Oklahoma	DE	Cutter Boley (3); Ty Redmond	Kentucky; Tennessee	QB; CB
Week 13 (Nov 24)	Diego Pavia (3)	Vanderbilt	QB	Taylor Wein; Martel Hight	Oklahoma; Vanderbilt	DL; CB	Grayson Miller (2); Jackson Ross	Oklahoma; Tennessee	P	Isaia Glass; Jesse Perry	Vanderbilt; Tennessee	OT; OG	Colin Simmons (4); Gracen Halton	Texas; Oklahoma	EDGE; DL	Deuce Knight	Auburn	QB
Week 14 (Dec 1)	Trinidad Chambliss (2); Sedrick Alexander	Ole Miss; Vanderbilt	QB; RB	Ethan Burke; Bray Hubbard (2)	Texas; Alabama	EDGE; S	Kevin Coleman	Missouri	PK/KOS	Jordan White (4); Trevor Goosby	Vanderbilt; Texas	C OL	Chris McClellan	Missouri	DT	Kamario Taylor (2)	Mississippi State	QB

==== Totals per school ====
School	Total
Alabama	0
Arkansas	0
Auburn	0
Florida	0
Georgia	0
Kentucky	0
LSU	0
Mississippi State	0
Missouri	0
Oklahoma	0
Ole Miss	0
South Carolina	0
Tennessee	0
Texas	0
Texas A&M	0
Vanderbilt	0

=== SEC individual awards ===
==== Players of the Year ====
On December 10, 2025, the Southeastern Conference released their Players of the Year and All-Conference Honors at the end of the season.

Award	Player/coach	School
Offensive Player of the Year	Diego Pavia	Vanderbilt
Defensive Player of the Year	Cashius Howell	Texas A&M
Freshman of the Year	Braylon Staley	Tennessee
Special Teams of the Year	Tate Sandell	Oklahoma
Newcomer of the Year	Trinidad Chambliss	Ole Miss
Jacobs Blocking Trophy	Kadyn Proctor; Trey Zuhn III	Alabama Texas A&M
Scholar Athlete of the Year	Nick Rinaldi	Vanderbilt
Coach of the Year	Clark Lea	Vanderbilt

=== All-Americans ===
Currently, the NCAA compiles consensus all-America teams in the sports of Division I-FBS football and Division I men's basketball using a point system computed from All-America teams named by coaches associations or media sources. The system consists of three points for a first-team honor, two points for second-team honor, and one point for third-team honor. Honorable mention and fourth team or lower recognitions are not accorded any points. College Football All-American consensus teams are compiled by position and the player accumulating the most points at each position is named first team consensus all-American. Currently, the NCAA recognizes All-Americans selected by the AP, AFCA, FWAA, TSN, and the WCFF to determine Consensus and Unanimous All-Americans. Any player named to the First Team by all five of the NCAA-recognized selectors is deemed a Unanimous All-American.

Position	Player	School	Selector	Unanimous	Consensus
First Team All-Americans
QB	Diego Pavia	Vanderbilt	(TSN, CBS)		
RB	Ahmad Hardy	Missouri	(AFCA, AP, TSN, WCFF, Athletic, CBS, ESPN, USAT)		✓
RB	Kewan Lacy	Ole Miss	(FWAA)		
TE	Eli Stowers	Vanderbilt	(AFCA, AP, FWAA, TSN, WCFF, Athletic, CBS, ESPN, PFF, SI, USAT)	✓	✓
OL	Kadyn Proctor	Alabama	(AFCA, FWAA, WCFF)		✓
OL	Febechi Nwaiwu	Oklahoma	(Athletic)		
OL	Keagen Trost	Missouri	(PFF)		
DL	Cashius Howell	Texas A&M	(AFCA, AP, FWAA, TSN, WCFF, Athletic, CBS, SI, USAT)	✓	✓
LB	CJ Allen	Georgia	(AP, FWAA, TSN, Athletic, ESPN, USAT)		✓
DB	Mansoor Delane	LSU	(AFCA, AP, FWAA, TSN, WCFF, Athletic, CBS, ESPN, USAT)	✓	✓
DB	A. J. Haulcy	LSU	(TSN)		
DB	Michael Taaffe	Texas	(AFCA)		
PK	Tate Sandell	Oklahoma	(FWAA, TSN, Athletic, PFF, SI, USAT)		
P	Brett Thorson	Georgia	(WCFF, Athletic, ESPN, SI, USAT)		
AP / RS	KC Concepcion	Texas A&M	(AFCA, AP, FWAA, Athletic, SI, USAT)		✓
AP / RS	Ryan Niblett	Texas	(FWAA)		
LS	Beau Gardner	Georgia	(AFCA)		

Position	Player	School	Selector
Second Team All-Americans
QB	Diego Pavia	Vanderbilt	(AP, FWAA, Athletic, CBS, ESPN, SI, USAT)
RB	Kewan Lacy	Ole Miss	(AFCA, AP, TSN, WCFF, Athletic, CBS, ESPN, SI, USAT)
RB	Ahmad Hardy	Missouri	(FWAA, SI)
WR	Mario Craver	Texas A&M	(FWAA)
OL	Kadyn Proctor	Alabama	(AP, TSN, CBS, SI, USAT)
OL	Ar'maj Reed-Adams	Texas A&M	(AP, CBS, SI, USAT)
OL	Keagen Trost	Missouri	(WCFF)
OL	Jaeden Roberts	Alabama	(USAT)
OL	Trey Zuhn III	Texas A&M	(Athletic)
C	Jake Slaughter	Florida	(AP, FWAA, TSN, WCFF, Athletic, USAT)
C	Drew Bobo	Georgia	(AFCA)
DL	Colin Simmons	Texas	(AFCA, TSN, WCFF, USAT)
DL	R Mason Thomas	Oklahoma	(AFCA, FWAA)
DL	Christen Miller	Georgia	(SI)
DL	Taylor Wein	Oklahoma	(SI)
LB	Anthony Hill Jr.	Texas	(AFCA, AP, FWAA, Athletic, ESPN, USAT)
LB	CJ Allen	Georgia	(AFCA, WCFF, CBS, ESPN, SI)
LB	Xavier Atkins	Auburn	(AFCA, WCFF)
LB	Taurean York	Texas A&M	(SI)
DB	Michael Taaffe	Texas	(FWAA, SI)
DB	Bray Hubbard	Alabama	(AFCA)
DB	KJ Bolden	Georgia	(Athletic, USAT)
DB	Mansoor Delane	LSU	(SI)
DB	A. J. Haulcy	LSU	(CBS)
PK	Tate Sandell	Oklahoma	(AFCA, AP, WCFF)
P	Brett Thorson	Georgia	(AP)
P	Ethan Pulliam	Mississippi State	(TSN)
P	Grayson Miller	Oklahoma	(CBS, SI)
AP / RS	KC Conception	Texas A&M	(TSN, CBS)
AP / RS	Ryan Niblett	Texas	(ESPN, SI)

Position	Player	School	Selector
Third Team All-Americans
WR	Chris Brazzell II	Tennessee	(AP)
OL	Keagen Trost	Missouri	(AP)
DB	Bray Hubbard	Alabama	(AP)
DB	Michael Taaffe	Texas	(AP)

==== List of All American Teams ====
- AFCA All-America Team
- AP All-America Team
- FWAA All-America Team
- The Sporting News
- Walter Camp All-America Team
- The Athletic All-America Team
- CBS Sports All-America Team
- PFF College All-America Team
- ESPN All-America Team
- Sports Illustrated All-America Team
- USA Today All-America Team

=== All-SEC teams ===
At the conclusion of the regular season All-SEC Conference football teams will be named.Any teams showing (_) following their name are indicating the number of All-Big 12 Conference Honors awarded to that university for 1st team and 2nd team respectively.

First Team

Position	Player	Class	Team
First Team offense
QB			
RB			
FB			
WR			
TE			
OL			
First Team defense
DL			
LB			
DB			
First Team Special Teams
PK			
P			
RS			

Second Team

Position	Player	Class	Team
Second Team offense
QB			
RB			
FB			
WR			
TE			
OL			
Second Team defense
DL			
LB			
DB			
Second Team Special Teams
PK			
P			
RS			

Notes:

- RS = return specialist
- AP/ST = all-purpose/special teams player (not a kicker or returner)
- † Two-time first team selection
- ‡ Three-time first team selection

Honorable mentions

- Alabama:
- Arkansas:
- Auburn:
- Florida:
- Georgia:
- Kentucky:
- LSU:
- Mississippi State:
- Missouri:
- Oklahoma:
- Ole Miss:
- South Carolina:
- Tennessee:
- Texas:
- Texas A&M:
- Vanderbilt:

=== National award winners ===
2025 College Football Award winners

Award	Player	Class	Position	School
SN Player of the Year	Diego Pavia	GS	QB	Vanderbilt
Johnny Unitas Golden Arm Award	Diego Pavia	GS	QB	Vanderbilt
John Mackey Award	Eli Stowers	GS	TE	Vanderbilt
William V. Campbell Trophy	Eli Stowers	GS	TE	Vanderbilt
Lou Groza Award	Tate Sandell	RS Jr.	PK	Oklahoma
Ray Guy Award	Brett Thorson	Sr.	P	Georgia
Patrick Mannelly Award	Beau Gardner	GS	LS	Georgia
Eddie Robinson Coach of the Year Award	Clark Lea		HC	Vanderbilt
Paul Hornung Award	KC Concepcion	Jr.	WR/RS	Texas A&M
Wuerffel Trophy	Michael Taaffe	RS Sr.	S	Texas

== Home game attendance ==
Team	Stadium	Capacity	Game 1	Game 2	Game 3	Game 4	Game 5	Game 6	Game 7	Game 8	Total	Average	% of capacity
Alabama	Bryant–Denny Stadium	100,077	100,077	100,077	100,077	100,077	100,077	100,077	100,077	—N/a	700,539	100,077	100%
Arkansas	Donald W. Reynolds Razorback Stadium	76,212	70,827	54,224 (Note: Game played at Arkansas' secondary home stadium War Memorial Stadium, capacity: 54,120)	75,111	73,845	68,922	68,358	61,508	—N/a	418,571	69,762	91.54%
Auburn	Jordan–Hare Stadium	87,451	88,043	88,043	88,043	87,798	88,043	88,043	88,043	—N/a	616,056	88,008	100.64%
Florida	Ben Hill Griffin Stadium	88,548	89,451	89,909	90,714	90,203	90,465	90,007	—N/a	—N/a	540,749	90,125	101.78%
Georgia	Sanford Stadium	93,033	93,033	93,033	93,033	93,033	93,033	93,033	93,033	—N/a	651,231	93,033	100%
Kentucky	Kroger Field	61,000	56,457	58,346	58,489	60,937	60,153	56,388	53,686	—N/a	404,456	57,779	94.72%
LSU	Tiger Stadium	102,321	101,667	102,158	102,219	101,921	101,924	100,212	100,923	—N/a	711,024	101,575	99.27%
Mississippi State	Davis Wade Stadium	60,311	50,808	49,158	45,803	60,417	52,680	53,017	60,417	—N/a	372,300	53,186	88.19%
Missouri	Faurot Field	57,321	57,321	57,321	57,321	57,321	57,321	57,321	57,321	57,321	458,568	57,321	100%
Oklahoma	Gaylord Family Oklahoma Memorial Stadium	80,126	83,218	84,107	83,639	83,016	83,468	83,541	83,734	—N/a	584,723	83,532	104.25%
Ole Miss	Vaught–Hemingway Stadium	64,038	66,378	65,068	65,644	67,737	66,392	67,491	67,326	68,138	534,174	66,772	104.27%
South Carolina	Williams–Brice Stadium	77,559	79,705	79,873	79,266	78,680	79,537	78,452	79,827	—N/a	555,340	79,334	102.29%
Tennessee	Neyland Stadium	101,915	101,915	101,915	101,915	101,915	101,915	101,915	101,915	—N/a	713,405	101,915	100%
Texas	Darrell K Royal-Texas Memorial Stadium	100,119	100,841	102,025	103,003	102,338	102,361	103,632	—N/a	—N/a	614,200	102,367	102.24%
Texas A&M	Kyle Field	102,733	107,521	100,026	108,449	108,572	105,086	108,582	104,877	—N/a	743,113	106,159	103.33%
Vanderbilt	FirstBank Stadium	40,350	35,000	35,000	33,688	35,000	35,000	35,000	35,000	—N/a	243,688	34,813	86.28%

== NFL draft ==
The NFL draft was held in Pittsburgh, Pennsylvania. The following list includes all SEC players selected in the draft.

=== List of selections ===
Player	Position	School	Draft round	Round pick	Overall pick	Team
Mansoor Delane	CB	LSU	1	6	6	Kansas City Chiefs
Kadyn Proctor	OT	Alabama	1	12	12	Miami Dolphins
Ty Simpson	QB	Alabama	1	13	13	Los Angeles Rams
Caleb Banks	DE	Florida	1	18	18	Minnesota Vikings
Monroe Freeling	OT	Georgia	1	19	19	Carolina Panthers
KC Concepcion	WR	Texas A&M	1	24	24	Cleveland Browns
Keldric Faulk	DE	Auburn	1	31	31	Tennessee Titans
De'Zhaun Stribling	WR	Ole Miss	2	1	33	San Francisco 49ers
Chase Bisontis	G	Texas A&M	2	2	34	Arizona Cardinals
Colton Hood	CB	Tennessee	2	5	37	New York Giants
R Mason Thomas	DE	Oklahoma	2	8	40	Kansas City Chiefs
Cashius Howell	EDGE	Texas A&M	2	9	41	Cincinnati Bengals
Christen Miller	DT	Georgia	2	10	42	New Orleans Saints
Zion Young	EDGE	Missouri	2	13	45	Baltimore Ravens
Josiah Trotter	LB	Missouri	2	14	46	Tampa Bay Buccaneers
Germie Bernard	WR	Alabama	2	15	47	Pittsburgh Steelers
Brandon Cisse	CB	South Carolina	2	20	52	Green Bay Packers
CJ Allen	LB	Georgia	2	21	53	Indianapolis Colts
Eli Stowers	TE	Vanderbilt	2	22	54	Philadelphia Eagles
Nate Boerkircher	TE	Texas A&M	2	24	56	Jacksonville Jaguars
Anthony Hill Jr.	LB	Texas	2	28	60	Tennessee Titans
Jake Slaughter	C	Florida	2	31	63	Los Angeles Chargers
Tyler Onyedim	DT	Texas A&M	3	2	66	Denver Broncos
Keyron Crawford	EDGE	Auburn	3	3	67	Las Vegas Raiders
Oscar Delp	TE	Georgia	3	9	73	New Orleans Saints
Chris McClellan	DT	Missouri	3	13	77	Green Bay Packers
A. J. Haulcy	S	LSU	3	14	78	Indianapolis Colts
Zachariah Branch	WR	Georgia	3	15	79	Atlanta Falcons
Albert Regis	DT	Texas A&M	3	17	81	Jacksonville Jaguars
Chris Brazzell II	WR	Tennessee	3	19	83	Carolina Panthers
Daylen Everette	CB	Georgia	3	21	85	Pittsburgh Steelers
Austin Barber	T	Florida	3	22	86	Cleveland Browns
Zavion Thomas	WR	LSU	3	25	89	Chicago Bears
Trey Zuhn III	C	Texas A&M	3	27	91	Las Vegas Raiders
Keagen Trost	OT	Missouri	3	29	93	Los Angeles Rams
Julian Neal	CB	Arkansas	3	35	99	Seattle Seahawks
Jermod McCoy	CB	Tennessee	4	1	101	Las Vegas Raiders
Brenen Thompson	WR	Mississippi State	4	5	105	Los Angeles Chargers
Febechi Nwaiwu	G	Oklahoma	4	6	106	Houston Texans
Gracen Halton	DT	Oklahoma	4	6	107	San Francisco 49ers
Jalen Farmer	G	Kentucky	4	13	113	Indianapolis Colts
Devin Moore	CB	Florida	4	14	114	Dallas Cowboys
Mike Washington Jr.	RB	Arkansas	4	22	122	Las Vegas Raiders
Malik Muhammad	CB	Texas	4	24	124	Chicago Bears
Connor Lew	C	Auburn	4	28	128	Cincinnati Bengals
Will Lee III	CB	Texas A&M	4	29	129	Carolina Panthers
Trey Moore	DE	Texas	4	30	130	Miami Dolphins
Jeremiah Wright	G	Auburn	4	32	132	New Orleans Saints
Kendal Daniels	LB	Oklahoma	4	34	134	Atlanta Falcons
LT Overton	DT	Alabama	4	37	137	Dallas Cowboys
Colbie Young	WR	Georgia	4	40	140	Cincinnati Bengals
Fernando Carmona	G	Arkansas	5	2	142	Tennessee Titans
Nick Barrett	DT	South Carolina	5	5	145	Los Angeles Chargers
Parker Brailsford	C	Alabama	5	6	146	Cleveland Browns
Joshua Josephs	DE	Tennessee	5	7	147	Washington Commanders
Justin Jefferson	LB	Alabama	5	9	149	Cleveland Browns
Jager Burton	C	Kentucky	5	13	153	Green Bay Packers
George Gumbs Jr.	DE	Florida	5	16	156	Indianapolis Colts
Michael Taaffe	S	Texas	5	18	158	Miami Dolphins
Jalon Kilgore	S	South Carolina	5	27	167	Buffalo Bills
Kendrick Law	WR	Kentucky	5	28	168	Detroit Lions
Josh Cuevas	TE	Alabama	5	33	173	Baltimore Ravens
Kevin Coleman Jr.	WR	Missouri	5	37	177	Miami Dolphins
Seydou Traore	TE	Mississippi State	5	40	180	Miami Dolphins
Taylen Green	QB	Arkansas	6	1	182	Cleveland Browns
Bauer Sharp	TE	LSU	6	4	185	Tampa Bay Buccaneers
Bobby Jamison-Travis	DT	Auburn	6	5	186	New York Giants
Barion Brown	WR	LSU	6	9	190	New Orleans Saints
Dametrious Crownover	OT	Texas A&M	6	15	196	New England Patriots
DJ Campbell	G	Texas	6	19	200	Miami Dolphins
Domani Jackson	CB	Alabama	6	20	201	Green Bay Packers
Micah Morris	G	Georgia	6	26	207	Philadelphia Eagles
Harold Perkins Jr.	LB	LSU	6	34	215	Atlanta Falcons
Trey Smack	K	Florida	6	35	216	Green Bay Packers
Jayden Williams	OT	Ole Miss	7	1	217	Arizona Cardinals
Toriano Pride Jr.	CB	Missouri	7	4	220	Buffalo Bills
Jack Endries	TE	Texas	7	5	221	Cincinnati Bengals
Tyre West	DE	Tennessee	7	6	222	Detroit Lions
Robert Spears-Jennings	S	Oklahoma	7	8	224	Pittsburgh Steelers
Jaren Kanak	TE	Oklahoma	7	9	225	Tennessee Titans
Tim Keenan III	DT	Alabama	7	16	232	Los Angeles Rams
Seth McGowan	RB	Kentucky	7	21	237	Indianapolis Colts
Tommy Doman	P	Florida	7	23	239	Buffalo Bills
Ar'maj Reed-Adams	G	Texas A&M	7	25	241	Buffalo Bills
Jam Miller	RB	Alabama	7	29	245	New England Patriots
Garrett Nussmeier	QB	LSU	7	33	249	Kansas City Chiefs
Deion Burks	WR	Oklahoma	7	38	254	Indianapolis Colts

=== Total picks by school ===
Team	Round 1	Round 2	Round 3	Round 4	Round 5	Round 6	Round 7	Total
Alabama	2	1	—	1	3	1	2	10
Arkansas	—	—	1	1	1	1	—	4
Auburn	1	—	1	2	—	1	—	5
Florida	1	1	1	1	1	1	1	7
Georgia	1	2	3	1	—	1	—	8
Kentucky	—	—	—	1	2	—	1	4
LSU	1	—	2	—	—	3	1	7
Mississippi State	—	—	—	1	1	—	—	2
Missouri	—	2	2	—	1	—	1	6
Oklahoma	—	1	—	3	—	—	3	7
Ole Miss	—	1	—	—	—	—	1	2
South Carolina	—	1	—	—	2	—	—	3
Tennessee	—	1	1	1	1	—	1	5
Texas	—	1	—	2	1	1	1	6
Texas A&M	1	3	3	1	—	1	1	10
Vanderbilt	—	1	—	—	—	—	—	1
Total	7	15	14	15	13	10	13	87

== Texas A&M–South Carolina sideline incident ==
2025 Texas A&M–South Carolina football sideline incident
- Date: November 15, 2025
- Time: afternoon
- Location: Kyle Field, College Station, Texas, U.S.
- Cause: Physical contact and confrontation between a Texas Department of Public Safety trooper and South Carolina football players
- Injuries: None publicly confirmed
- Litigation: Criminal complaint filed

The 2025 Texas A&M–South Carolina football sideline incident was an altercation during a college football game on November 15, 2025, at Kyle Field in College Station, Texas, involving members of the University of South Carolina football team and a Texas Department of Public Safety (DPS) trooper. The episode drew widespread media attention after broadcast footage circulated online and led to legal actions weeks after the game.

=== Background ===
The incident occurred during a conference matchup between the South Carolina Gamecocks and the Texas A&M Aggies. South Carolina, as the heavy underdog, was already leading by an astonishing scoreline of 20–3; if that lead had held, a loss would have seriously damaged the hopes of the as-yet-undefeated Aggies in their quest to make their first-ever College Football Playoff.

Instead of the highly favored Aggies drawing the game closer, South Carolina unexpectedly scored an 80-yard touchdown in the second quarter to extend their lead to 23 points, with wide receiver Nyck Harbor hauling in the long pass—and limping into the locker room tunnel after the score. Several South Carolina players followed him in celebration, and then the group headed back toward the field.

=== Incident ===
As Harbor and teammates, including running back Oscar Adaway III, approached the end zone and were walking back toward the field through a northeast tunnel at Kyle Field, a Texas DPS trooper was seen walking in the opposite direction and made contact with the players. Video from the game shows the trooper bumping into Harbor and Adaway, then turning toward them while pointing and appearing to speak or scold the players before they returned to the field.

The interaction was captured live during the ESPN broadcast of the game and quickly went viral, drawing reactions from sports fans and commentators online. Notable figures, including NBA star LeBron James and NFL pro Benjamin Watson, publicly criticized the trooper's conduct on social media.

In response, the Texas A&M University Police Department and the Texas Department of Public Safety announced that the trooper involved was relieved of his game-day duties and sent home from the event, and that the DPS Office of Inspector General would review the interaction.

Following the interaction, the Gamecocks began to spiral; the heavily favored Aggies began to rally in the third quarter and ultimately defeated South Carolina to preserve their undefeated season. Texas A&M finished the regular season at 11–1, easily enough to earn a playoff spot; South Carolina finished two wins away from bowl eligibility at 4–8.

=== Aftermath ===
The incident received sustained media coverage in the days and weeks following the game, especially as video circulated widely on social media and news outlets. Critics argued the trooper's actions were inappropriate and unnecessary, while some commentators debated the presence and role of law enforcement at sporting events.

On December 12, 2025, Oscar Adaway III filed a criminal complaint against the trooper in Brazos County, accusing him of assault during the November game, and seeking accountability and an apology. His complaint cited emotional distress and sleep difficulties following the encounter. Legal experts discussed the potential for third-degree assault charges in connection with the case, and the complaint highlighted frustrations over the trooper's identity not being publicly disclosed.

Some declined to defend the police officer, such as Brazos County First Assistant District Attorney, Shane Phelps, who said, "I'm pretty pro law enforcement, but there are police officers who do stupid things, and this was a really stupid thing to do in front of 110,000 people." Others took the officer's side, such as former Texas A&M quarterback Johnny Manziel, who said, "Around here in these parts, partner, we protect this house. We paid a lot of money for this house. Get out of my tunnel, boy. Get back on the field." The complaint was ultimately dismissed by Brazos County officials; the officer was never charged and his name was never released.

The Texas DPS reiterated after the game that it was investigating the matter through its internal oversight office, and Texas A&M Police confirmed that the trooper would not work future home games while the review continued.
