= Taurean York =

American football player (born 2005)

Profile
- Position: Linebacker

Personal information
- Born: June 21, 2005 (age 21); Temple, Texas, U.S.
- Listed height: 5 ft 11 in (1.80 m)
- Listed weight: 226 lb (103 kg)

Career information
- High school: Temple (Temple, Texas)
- College: Texas A&M (2023–2025)
- NFL draft: 2026: undrafted

Career history
- Denver Broncos (2026)*
- * Offseason or practice squad member only

Awards and highlights
- Second-team All-SEC (2025); First-team All-SEC Freshman (2023)
- Stats at Pro Football Reference

Taurean A. York (born June 21, 2005) is an American professional football linebacker. He played college football for the Texas A&M Aggies and was signed by the Denver Broncos as an undrafted free agent in 2026.

== Early life ==
York attended Temple High School in Temple, Texas. During his high school career, he had 435 tackles, 15 sacks and one interception. He was the UIL District 12-6A Defensive MVP from his sophomore to senior seasons. York originally committed to play college football at Baylor University before switching to Texas A&M University.

== College career ==
York started all 13 games as a true freshman at Texas A&M in 2023 and was named a freshman All-American. He finished the year with 74 tackles and three sacks.

== Professional career ==
Pre-draft measurables
Height	Weight	Arm length	Hand span	Wingspan	40-yard dash	10-yard split	20-yard split	20-yard shuttle	Three-cone drill	Vertical jump	Bench press
5 ft 10 3/4 in (1.80 m)	226 lb (103 kg)	30 in (0.76 m)	8 1/2 in (0.22 m)	6 ft 3 3/8 in (1.91 m)	4.60 s	1.62 s	2.66 s	4.34 s	7.19 s	30.5 in (0.77 m)	25 reps
All values from NFL Combine/Pro Day

After going unselected in the 2026 NFL draft, York was signed by the Denver Broncos as an undrafted free agent. On August 30, 2026, he was waived by the Broncos as a part of final roster cuts.
