= Connor Lew =

American football player (born 2005)

No. 65 – Cincinnati Bengals
- Position: Center
- Roster status: Active

Personal information
- Born: August 30, 2005 (age 21)
- Listed height: 6 ft 3 in (1.91 m)
- Listed weight: 310 lb (141 kg)

Career information
- High school: Kennesaw Mountain (Kennesaw, Georgia)
- College: Auburn (2023–2025)
- NFL draft: 2026: 4th round, 128th overall pick

Career history
- Cincinnati Bengals (2026–present)

Awards and highlights
- SEC All-Freshman Team (2023)
- Stats at Pro Football Reference

Connor Lew (born August 30, 2005) is an American professional football center for the Cincinnati Bengals of the National Football League (NFL). He played college football for the Auburn Tigers and was selected by the Bengals in the fourth round of the 2026 NFL draft.

== Early life ==
Lew attended Kennesaw Mountain High School in Kennesaw, Georgia. In his junior season, he helped his school to a ten win season, helping the offense average 32 points per game while also notching 15 tackles with seven tackles going for a loss, a sack, and a forced fumble on defense. Lew was invited to participate in the All-American Bowl. Coming out of high school, he was rated as a three-star recruit and the 7th center in the class of 2023, holding offers from Auburn, Clemson, Georgia, and Miami. Lew initially committed to play college football at Miami before flipping his commitment to Auburn.

== College career ==
In week eight of the 2023 season, Lew took over as the starting center after starter Avery Jones went down with an injury. For his performance in his first start versus Mississippi State, Lew was named the SEC freshman of the week. During the 2023 season, Lew played in 11 games, making six starts. He was named to the SEC All-Freshman Team.

== Professional career ==
Pre-draft measurables
Height	Weight	Arm length	Hand span	Wingspan	Bench press
6 ft 3 1/2 in (1.92 m)	310 lb (141 kg)	32 3/8 in (0.82 m)	9 in (0.23 m)	6 ft 6 7/8 in (2.00 m)	31 reps
All values from NFL Combine

Lew was selected with the 128th overall pick in the 2026 NFL draft by the Cincinnati Bengals, after they traded the 110th & 199th picks to the New York Jets in exchange for the 128th & 140th picks. He signed his rookie contract on May 8.
