= Jeremiah Wright (American football) =

American football player (born 2001)

No. 65 – New Orleans Saints
- Position: Guard
- Roster status: Active

Personal information
- Born: September 5, 2001 (age 25); Selma, Alabama, U.S.
- Listed height: 6 ft 5 in (1.96 m)
- Listed weight: 331 lb (150 kg)

Career information
- High school: Selma (Selma, Alabama)
- College: Auburn (2020–2025)
- NFL draft: 2026: 4th round, 132nd overall pick

Career history
- New Orleans Saints (2026–present)

Career NFL statistics as of Week 4, 2026
- Games played: 4
- Stats at Pro Football Reference

Jeremiah Wright (born September 5, 2001) is an American professional football guard for the New Orleans Saints of the National Football League (NFL). He played college football for the Auburn Tigers and was selected by the Saints in the fourth round of the 2026 NFL draft.

== Early life ==
Wright was born on September 5, 2001 in Selma, Alabama and attended Selma High School. He was rated as a three-star recruit and committed to play college football for the Auburn Tigers over other offers from schools such as Georgia Tech and Memphis.

== College career ==
As a freshman in 2020, Wright recorded four tackles with one going for a loss in six games. He missed the entire 2021 season after tearing an ACL in the team's first spring camp of the offseason. Heading into the 2022 season, Wright converted from the defensive line to play as an offensive guard. In week 8 of the 2022 season, he made his first collegiate start in a 48–24 loss to Ole Miss. In the 2022 season, Wright played in 12 games with one start. In 2023, he appeared in all 13 games off the bench. Heading into the 2024 season, Wright was named the team's starting right guard. In the 2024 season, he started all 12 games at right guard.

== Professional career ==
Pre-draft measurables
Height	Weight	Arm length	Hand span	Wingspan
6 ft 5 1/8 in (1.96 m)	331 lb (150 kg)	33 1/8 in (0.84 m)	10 in (0.25 m)	6 ft 11 1/8 in (2.11 m)
All values from NFL Combine

Wright was selected by the New Orleans Saints in the fourth round with the 132nd overall pick of the 2026 NFL draft. The Saints used one of the selections they previously received from the Seattle Seahawks in the trade for Rashid Shaheed.
