= KJ Bolden =

American football player (born 2006)

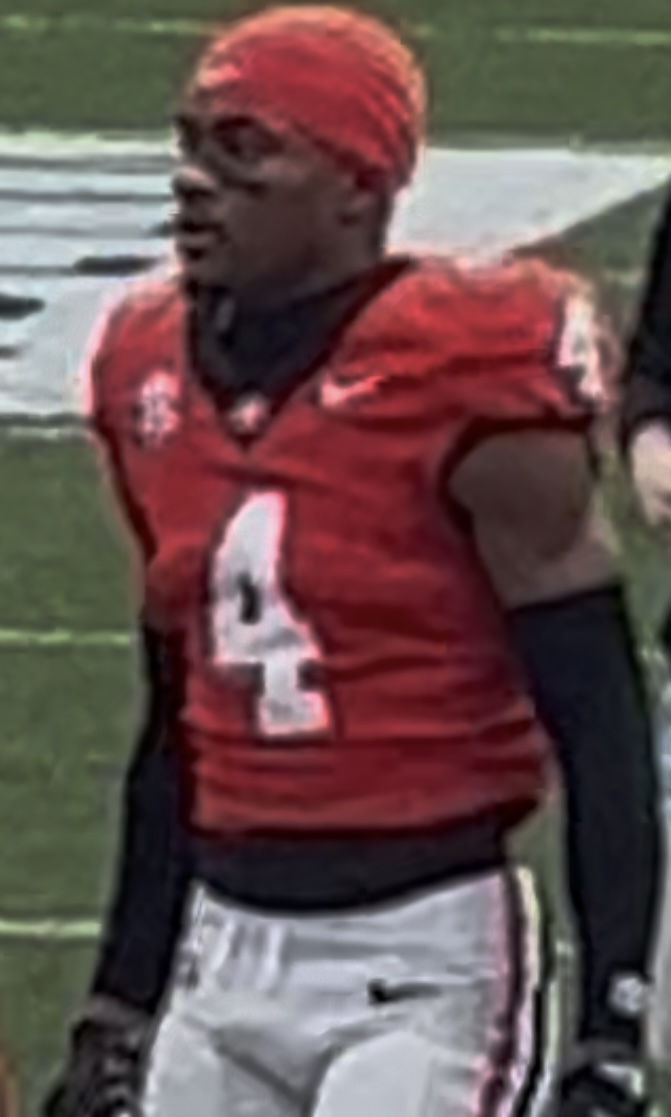
- Bolden in 2025

No. 4 – Georgia Bulldogs
- Position: Safety
- Class: Junior

Personal information
- Born: February 18, 2006 (age 20); Buford, Georgia, U.S.
- Listed height: 6 ft 0 in (1.83 m)
- Listed weight: 195 lb (88 kg)

Career information
- High school: Buford
- College: Georgia (2024–present)

Awards and highlights
- Second-team All-SEC (2025); Freshman All-American (2024)
- Stats at ESPN

Khalil Ja’Qua Bolden (born February 18, 2006) is an American college football safety for the Georgia Bulldogs of the Southeastern Conference (SEC).

== Early life ==
Bolden grew up in Buford, Georgia. When he was 10 years old, his father Kai was sentenced to 10 years in federal prison for drug trafficking and money laundering following a Department of Justice investigation dubbed "Operation High Rollers". He was released in 2023 after serving six years. Bolden attended Buford High School where he played football and ran track. A two-way player at wide receiver and safety, Bolden was a two time all-state selection in football and was named the Georgia Region 8-7A Defensive Player of the Year as a senior. He was selected to All-American Bowl in 2024. A five star prospect ranked the #1 safety recruit in his class, Bolden originally committed to play college football at Florida State before flipping to the University of Georgia on national signing day.

== College career ==
In his collegiate debut, Bolden recorded four tackles on 49 snaps, the most snaps of any Georgia defender, as the Bulldogs defeated Clemson 34–3.

=== College statistics ===
Legend
**Bold**	Career high

Year	Team	GP	Tackles					Interceptions					Fumbles		
Year	Team	GP	Solo	Ast	Cmb	TFL	Sck	Int	Yds	Avg	TD	PD	FR	FF	TD
2024	Georgia	14	**40**	19	59	2.0	**1.0**	1	0	0.0	0	1	0	**1**	0
2025	Georgia	13	26	**40**	**66**	**2.5**	0.0	**2**	0	0.0	0	**4**	**1**	0	0
Career		27	66	59	125	4.5	1.0	3	0	0.0	0	5	1	1	0
