= Caleb Banks =

American football player (born 2003)

No. 95 – Minnesota Vikings
- Position: Defensive tackle
- Roster status: Active

Personal information
- Born: March 12, 2003 (age 23); Detroit, Michigan, U.S.
- Listed height: 6 ft 6 in (1.98 m)
- Listed weight: 327 lb (148 kg)

Career information
- High school: Southfield (Southfield, Michigan)
- College: Louisville (2021–2022); Florida (2023–2025)
- NFL draft: 2026: 1st round, 18th overall pick

Career history
- Minnesota Vikings (2026–present)

Career NFL statistics as of Week 10, 2026
- Tackles: 14
- Stats at Pro Football Reference

Caleb Banks (born March 12, 2003) is an American professional football defensive tackle for the Minnesota Vikings of the National Football League (NFL). He played college football for the Louisville Cardinals and Florida Gators and was selected by the Vikings in the first round of the 2026 NFL draft.

== Early life ==
Banks attended Southfield High School in Southfield, Michigan. As a senior he recorded 42 tackles and three sacks. He originally committed to play college football at Arizona State University before switching to the University of Louisville. He was also a member of the basketball team in high school.

== College career ==
Banks played in one game and redshirted his first year at Louisville in 2021 and played in six games with two tackles and one sack his redshirt freshman year in 2022. After the season, he entered the transfer portal and transferred to the University of Florida. In his first year at Florida in 2023, Banks started 11 of 12 games and had 19 tackles and one sack. He returned to Florida as a starter his redshirt junior year in 2024. Banks suffered a foot injury during training camp for the 2025 season. He tried to play through the injury but missed a couple months, coming back for the last two games of the season. Banks suffered another foot injury after breaking his fourth metatarsal bone at the NFL combine, undergoing surgery and sidelining him until June 2026.

== Professional career ==
Pre-draft measurables
Height	Weight	Arm length	Hand span	Wingspan	40-yard dash	10-yard split	20-yard split	Vertical jump	Broad jump
6 ft 6 1/4 in (1.99 m)	327 lb (148 kg)	35 in (0.89 m)	10 7/8 in (0.28 m)	7 ft 1 3/4 in (2.18 m)	5.04 s	1.76 s	2.92 s	32.0 in (0.81 m)	9 ft 6 in (2.90 m)
All values from NFL Combine

Banks was selected by the Minnesota Vikings with the 18th overall pick in the 2026 NFL draft.
