= R Mason Thomas =

American football player (born 2004)

No. 51 – Kansas City Chiefs
- Position: Defensive end
- Roster status: Active

Personal information
- Born: August 25, 2004 (age 22)
- Listed height: 6 ft 2 in (1.88 m)
- Listed weight: 249 lb (113 kg)

Career information
- High school: Cardinal Gibbons (Fort Lauderdale, Florida)
- College: Oklahoma (2022–2025)
- NFL draft: 2026: 2nd round, 40th overall pick

Career history
- Kansas City Chiefs (2026–present)

Awards and highlights
- First-team All-SEC (2025); Second-team All-SEC (2024)

Career NFL statistics as of Week 10, 2026
- Tackles: 8
- Sacks: 1.0
- Pass deflections: 2
- Stats at Pro Football Reference

R Mason Thomas (born August 25, 2004) is an American professional football defensive end for the Kansas City Chiefs of the National Football League (NFL). He played college football for the Oklahoma Sooners before being selected by the Chiefs in the second round of the 2026 NFL draft.

== Early life ==
Thomas was born in Pompano Beach, Florida. His father, Harvey, played defensive end and tight end for the Florida Gators from 1988 to 1992. His mother's family had a tradition of names beginning with the letter R, but she preferred the name Mason, so he was named R Mason (the R does not stand for anything). Thomas attended Cardinal Gibbons High School in Fort Lauderdale, Florida. Over his junior and senior seasons he combined for 109 tackles and 19 sacks. He originally committed to play college football at Iowa State University before changing to the University of Oklahoma.

== College career ==
As a true freshman at Oklahoma in 2022, Thomas played in 10 games and had seven tackles and 0.5 sacks. As a sophomore he played in nine games and finished with nine tackles and one sack. Thomas returned to Oklahoma his junior season in 2024 and earned more playing time. Against Tulane he had three sacks, a forced fumble and fumble recovery.

== Professional career ==
Pre-draft measurables
Height	Weight	Arm length	Hand span	Wingspan	40-yard dash	10-yard split	20-yard split	Three-cone drill	Vertical jump	Broad jump
6 ft 2 1/4 in (1.89 m)	241 lb (109 kg)	31 5/8 in (0.80 m)	8 7/8 in (0.23 m)	6 ft 6 1/8 in (1.98 m)	4.67 s	1.63 s	2.73 s	7.40 s	34.0 in (0.86 m)	9 ft 11 in (3.02 m)
All values from NFL Combine/Pro Day

Thomas was selected by the Kansas City Chiefs in the second round, with the 40th overall pick in the 2026 NFL draft.
