= Ar'maj Reed-Adams =

American football player (born 2001)

No. 60 – Buffalo Bills
- Position: Guard
- Roster status: Injured reserve

Personal information
- Born: November 4, 2001 (age 25)
- Listed height: 6 ft 6 in (1.98 m)
- Listed weight: 314 lb (142 kg)

Career information
- High school: DeSoto (DeSoto, Texas)
- College: Kansas (2020–2023); Texas A&M (2024–2025)
- NFL draft: 2026: 7th round, 241st overall pick

Career history
- Buffalo Bills (2026–present)

Awards and highlights
- Second-team All-American (2025); Second-team All-SEC (2025)

Career NFL statistics as of Week 9, 2026
- Games played: 1
- Stats at Pro Football Reference

Ar'maj Reed-Adams (born November 4, 2001) is an American professional football guard for the Buffalo Bills of the National Football League (NFL). He played college football for the Kansas Jayhawks and the Texas A&M Aggies and was selected by the Bills in the seventh round of the 2026 NFL draft.

== Early life ==
Reed-Adams attended John Horn High School in Mesquite, Texas for three years before transferring to DeSoto High School in DeSoto, Texas for his senior year. He committed to the University of Kansas to play college football.

== College career ==
Reed-Adams played at Kansas from 2020 to 2023, appearing in 31 games with 15 starts. After the 2023, he entered the transfer portal and transferred to Texas A&M University. In his first year at A&M, he started all 13 games at right guard. Reed-Adams returned to A&M in 2025 and was named a team captain.

== Professional career ==
Pre-draft measurables
Height	Weight	Arm length	Hand span	Wingspan	40-yard dash	10-yard split	20-yard split	20-yard shuttle	Three-cone drill	Vertical jump	Broad jump	Bench press
6 ft 5 3/4 in (1.97 m)	314 lb (142 kg)	34 3/8 in (0.87 m)	10 in (0.25 m)	7 ft 1 in (2.16 m)	5.28 s	1.85 s	3.06 s	5.03 s	7.72 s	29.5 in (0.75 m)	9 ft 2 in (2.79 m)	25 reps
All values from NFL Combine/Pro Day

Reed-Adams was selected by the Buffalo Bills in the seventh round with the 241st overall pick of the 2026 NFL Draft.
