= Suntarine Perkins =

American football player (born 2003)

No. 4 – Ole Miss Rebels
- Position: Linebacker
- Class: Senior

Personal information
- Born: November 17, 2003 (age 22)
- Listed height: 6 ft 2 in (1.88 m)
- Listed weight: 220 lb (100 kg)

Career information
- High school: Raleigh (Raleigh, Mississippi)
- College: Ole Miss (2023–present)

Awards and highlights
- First-team All-SEC Freshman (2023)
- Stats at ESPN

Suntarine Margo Perkins (born November 17, 2003) is an American college football linebacker for the Ole Miss Rebels.

== Early life ==
Perkins attended Raleigh High School in Raleigh, Mississippi. He played linebacker and running back in high school. Over his career he had 267 tackles and 10 sacks on defense. As a senior, he had 2,078 yards and 32 touchdowns. A five star recruit, Perkins committed to the University of Mississippi (Ole Miss) to play college football.

== College career ==
Perkins became a starter for Ole Miss during his true freshman season in 2023.

=== Statistics ===
Season	Team	GP	Tackles					Def Interceptions					Fumbles			
Season	Team	GP	Solo	Ast	Comb	TFL	Sk	Int	Yds	Avg	TD	PD	FR	Yds	TD	FF
2023	Ole Miss	13	18	20	38	5.5	3.5	0	0	0.0	0	1	0	0	0	0
2024	Ole Miss	13	32	28	60	14.0	10.5	1	0	0.0	0	0	2	0	0	0
2025	Ole Miss	15	41	40	81	12.5	4.5	1	0	0.0	0	6	2	0	0	3
2026	Ole Miss	2	5	5	10	1.5	0.5	0	0	0.0	0	0	0	0	0	0
Career		43	96	93	189	33.5	19.0	2	0	0.0	0	7	4	0	0	3
