= Keldric Faulk =

American football player (born 2004)

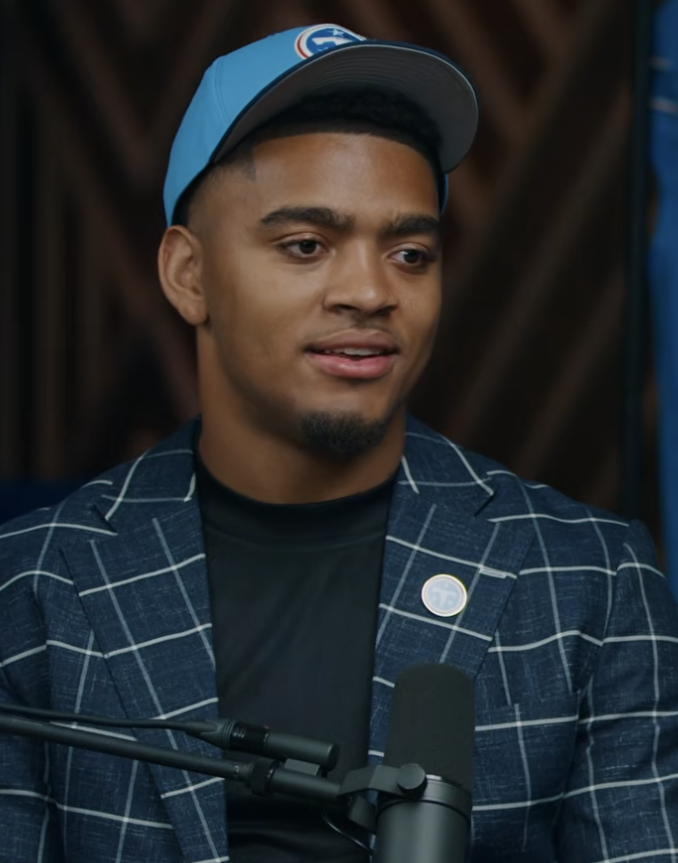
- Faulk in 2026

No. 15 – Tennessee Titans
- Position: Defensive end
- Roster status: Active

Personal information
- Born: September 7, 2004 (age 22); Ramer, Alabama, U.S.
- Listed height: 6 ft 6 in (1.98 m)
- Listed weight: 274 lb (124 kg)

Career information
- High school: Highland Home (Highland Home, Alabama)
- College: Auburn (2023–2025)
- NFL draft: 2026: 1st round, 31st overall pick

Career history
- Tennessee Titans (2026−present)

Awards and highlights
- Third-team All-SEC (2025); SEC All-Freshman Team (2023)

Career NFL statistics as of Week 4, 2026
- Total tackles: 6
- Sacks: 1
- Stats at Pro Football Reference

Keldric Faulk (born September 7, 2004) is an American professional football defensive end for the Tennessee Titans of the National Football League (NFL). He played college football for the Auburn Tigers and was selected by the Titans in the first round of the 2026 NFL draft.

== Early life ==
Faulk was born on September 7, 2004, in Ramer, Alabama, and was raised in Highland Home, Alabama. He attended Highland Home School. A five-star recruit, he was selected to play in the 2023 All-American Bowl. He originally committed to play college football at Florida State University before flipping to Auburn University.

== College career ==
As a true freshman at Auburn in 2023, Faulk played in all 13 games and had 35 tackles and one sack and was named a member of the SEC All-Freshman team. He returned to Auburn his sophomore year in 2024 as a starter.

== Professional career ==
Pre-draft measurables
Height	Weight	Arm length	Hand span	Wingspan	40-yard dash	10-yard split	20-yard split	Vertical jump	Broad jump	Bench press
6 ft 5 7/8 in (1.98 m)	276 lb (125 kg)	34 3/8 in (0.87 m)	9 7/8 in (0.25 m)	6 ft 10 1/4 in (2.09 m)	4.68 s	1.68 s	2.72 s	35.0 in (0.89 m)	9 ft 9 in (2.97 m)	17 reps
All values from NFL Combine/Pro Day

Faulk was selected in the first round of the 2026 NFL draft with the 31st overall pick by the Tennessee Titans. The selection was received from the Buffalo Bills in an equal exchange of selections, with the Bills receiving a fourth-round selection (No. 101, traded to the Las Vegas Raiders) by trading away their fifth-round selection (No. 165).
