= Jaeden Roberts =

American football player (born 2002)

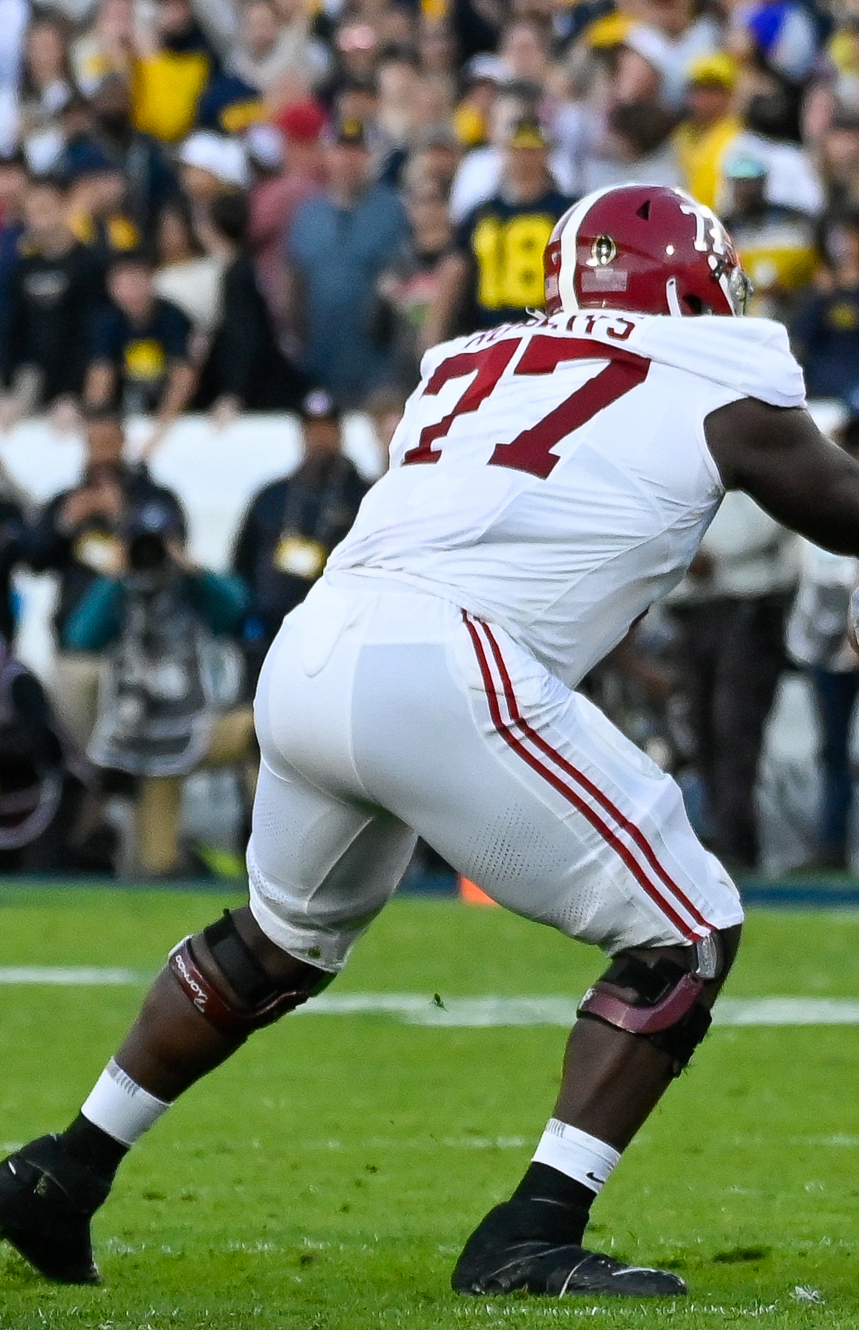

Profile
- Position: Offensive guard

Personal information
- Born: December 22, 2002 (age 23)
- Listed height: 6 ft 5 in (1.96 m)
- Listed weight: 333 lb (151 kg)

Career information
- High school: North Shore (Harris County, Texas)
- College: Alabama (2021–2025)
- NFL draft: 2026: undrafted

Career history
- Philadelphia Eagles (2026)*; Atlanta Falcons (2026)*
- * Offseason or practice squad member only
- Stats at Pro Football Reference

Jaeden Roberts (born December 22, 2002) is an American professional football offensive guard. He played college football for the Alabama Crimson Tide.

== Early life ==
Coming out of high school, Roberts was rated as a three-star recruit and initially committed to play college football for the Auburn Tigers over offers from schools such as Alabama, Arkansas, Baylor, LSU and Oklahoma State. A few months later, he de-committed from the Auburn Tigers. From there, Roberts finally committed to play for the Alabama Crimson Tide.

== College career ==
During the 2022 season, Roberts played in three games for the Crimson Tide with no starts. He made his first career start in week 5 of the 2023 season in a win over Texas A&M. In 2023, Roberts played in 11 games, making eight starts for the Crimson Tide.

== Professional career ==
Pre-draft measurables
Height	Weight	Arm length	Hand span	Wingspan	40-yard dash	10-yard split	20-yard split	Bench press
6 ft 5 1/4 in (1.96 m)	333 lb (151 kg)	33 3/8 in (0.85 m)	10 1/4 in (0.26 m)	6 ft 11 1/4 in (2.11 m)	5.31 s	1.85 s	3.08 s	25 reps
All values from NFL Combine/Pro Day

=== Philadelphia Eagles ===
After going unselected in the 2026 NFL draft, Roberts signed with the Philadelphia Eagles as an undrafted free agent. He was waived by the Eagles on August 10.

=== Atlanta Falcons ===
On August 11, 2026, Roberts was claimed off waivers by the Atlanta Falcons. He was waived by the Falcons on August 29.
