= Will Lee III =

American football player (born 2003)

No. 24 – Carolina Panthers
- Position: Cornerback
- Roster status: Active

Personal information
- Born: April 9, 2003 (age 23); St. Louis, Missouri, U.S.
- Listed height: 6 ft 1 in (1.85 m)
- Listed weight: 195 lb (88 kg)

Career information
- High school: Kirkwood (Kirkwood, Missouri)
- College: Iowa Western (2021–2022); Kansas State (2023); Texas A&M (2024–2025)
- NFL draft: 2026: 4th round, 129th overall pick

Career history
- Carolina Panthers (2026–present)

Awards and highlights
- Second-team All-SEC (2024)

Career NFL statistics as of Week 8, 2026
- Total tackles: 33
- Forced fumbles: 1
- Fumble recoveries: 1
- Pass deflections: 7
- Stats at Pro Football Reference

William Ard Lee III (born April 9, 2003) is an American professional football cornerback for the Carolina Panthers of the National Football League (NFL). He played college football for the Iowa Western Reivers, the Kansas State Wildcats and the Texas A&M Aggies and he was selected by the Panthers in the fourth round of the 2026 NFL draft.

== College career ==
Lee III spent two years at Iowa Western Community College. After redshirting his first year in 2021, he was named a NJCAA First Team All-American in 2022 after recording 34 tackles and an interception in 12 games. Lee III transferred to Kansas State University for the 2023 season. In his lone year at Kansas State he played in 11 games and had 42 tackles and two interceptions. After the season, he entered the transfer portal and transferred to Texas A&M University.

== Professional career ==
Pre-draft measurables
Height	Weight	Arm length	Hand span	Wingspan	40-yard dash	10-yard split	20-yard split	Vertical jump	Broad jump
6 ft 1 1/2 in (1.87 m)	189 lb (86 kg)	32 3/4 in (0.83 m)	9 in (0.23 m)	6 ft 7 1/4 in (2.01 m)	4.52 s	1.56 s	2.63 s	42.0 in (1.07 m)	11 ft 0 in (3.35 m)
All values from NFL Combine

Lee was selected by the Carolina Panthers in the fourth round with the 129th overall pick of the 2026 NFL draft.
