= 2025 Oklahoma Sooners football team =

American college football season

2025 Oklahoma Sooners football

CFP First Round, L 24–34 vs. Alabama
- Conference: Southeastern Conference

Ranking
- Coaches: No. 10
- AP: No. 13
- Record: 10–3 (6–2 SEC)
- Head coach: Brent Venables (4th season)
- Offensive coordinator: Ben Arbuckle (1st season)
- Offensive scheme: Spread / air raid
- Co-defensive coordinators: Todd Bates (4th season); Jay Valai (4th season)
- Base defense: Multiple 4–2–5
- Home stadium: Gaylord Family Oklahoma Memorial Stadium

Uniform

2025 Southeastern Conference football standings
	Conf.			Overall
Team	W		L	W		L
No. 9 Alabama y^	7	–	1	11	–	4
No. 6 Georgia y$^	7	–	1	12	–	2
No. 3 Ole Miss ^	7	–	1	13	–	2
No. 8 Texas A&M ^	7	–	1	11	–	2
No. 13 Oklahoma ^	6	–	2	10	–	3
No. 12 Texas	6	–	2	10	–	3
No. 15 Vanderbilt	6	–	2	10	–	3
Missouri	4	–	4	8	–	5
Tennessee	4	–	4	8	–	5
LSU	3	–	5	7	–	6
Kentucky	2	–	6	5	–	7
Florida	2	–	6	4	–	8
Auburn	1	–	7	5	–	7
Mississippi State	1	–	7	5	–	8
South Carolina	1	–	7	4	–	8
Arkansas	0	–	8	2	–	10
Championship: Georgia 28, Alabama 7
^ – College Football Playoff participant; $ – Conference champion; y – Championship game participant; Rankings from AP Poll

The 2025 Oklahoma Sooners football team represented the University of Oklahoma in the Southeastern Conference (SEC) during the 2025 NCAA Division I FBS football season, the 131st season for the Oklahoma Sooners. Led by fourth-year head coach Brent Venables, the Sooners played home games at Gaylord Family Oklahoma Memorial Stadium in Norman, Oklahoma.

The Oklahoma Sooners drew an average home attendance of 83,532, the 13th-highest of all college football teams.

== Schedule ==
Oklahoma and the SEC announced the 2025 conference schedule on December 11, 2024. The 2025 schedule consists of seven home games, four away games and one neutral-site game in the regular season. The Sooners hosted three non-conference games against Illinois State, Michigan, and Kent State and traveled to Temple. The Sooners hosted four SEC conference opponents against Auburn, Ole Miss, Missouri, and LSU, and traveled to three SEC conference opponents against South Carolina, Tennessee, and Alabama. The Sooners faced Texas in Dallas, Texas at the Cotton Bowl in the 121st Red River Rivalry.

Date	Time	Opponent	Rank	Site	TV	Result	Attendance
August 30	5:00 p.m.	No. 6 (FCS) Illinois State*	No. 18	Gaylord Family Oklahoma Memorial Stadium; Norman, OK	SECN+/ESPN+	W 35–3	83,218
September 6	6:30 p.m.	No. 15 Michigan*	No. 18	Gaylord Family Oklahoma Memorial Stadium; Norman, OK (College GameDay)	ABC	W 24–13	84,107
September 13	11:00 a.m.	at Temple*	No. 13	Lincoln Financial Field; Philadelphia, PA	ESPN2	W 42–3	24,927
September 20	2:30 p.m.	No. 22 Auburn	No. 11	Gaylord Family Oklahoma Memorial Stadium; Norman, OK (SEC Nation)	ABC	W 24–17	83,639
October 4	3:00 p.m.	Kent State*	No. 5	Gaylord Family Oklahoma Memorial Stadium; Norman, OK	SECN	W 44–0	83,016
October 11	2:30 p.m.	vs. Texas	No. 6	Cotton Bowl; Dallas, TX (Red River Rivalry)	ABC	L 6–23	92,100
October 18	11:45 a.m.	at South Carolina	No. 14	Williams–Brice Stadium; Columbia, SC	SECN	W 26–7	78,680
October 25	11:00 a.m.	No. 8 Ole Miss^{†}	No. 13	Gaylord Family Oklahoma Memorial Stadium; Norman, OK (SEC Nation)	ABC	L 26–34	83,468
November 1	6:30 p.m.	at No. 14 Tennessee	No. 18	Neyland Stadium; Knoxville, TN	ABC	W 33–27	101,915
November 15	2:30 p.m.	at No. 4 Alabama	No. 11	Bryant–Denny Stadium; Tuscaloosa, AL	ABC	W 23–21	100,077
November 22	11:00 a.m.	No. 22 Missouri	No. 8	Gaylord Family Oklahoma Memorial Stadium; Norman, OK (rivalry)	ABC	W 17–6	83,541
November 29	2:30 p.m.	LSU	No. 8	Gaylord Family Oklahoma Memorial Stadium; Norman, OK	ABC	W 17–13	83,734
December 19	7:00 p.m.	(9) No. 9 Alabama*	(8) No. 8	Gaylord Family Oklahoma Memorial Stadium; Norman, OK (CFP First Round, College GameDay, SEC Nation)	ABC/ESPN	L 24–34	83,550
*Non-conference game; ^{†}Homecoming; Rankings from AP Poll (and CFP Rankings, after November 4) - Released prior to game; All times are in Central time

== Rankings ==
Ranking movements Legend: ██ Increase in ranking ██ Decrease in ranking RV = Received votes т = Tied with team above or below ( ) = First-place votes
	Week																
Poll	Pre	1	2	3	4	5	6	7	8	9	10	11	12	13	14	15	Final
AP	18	18	13	11	7 (1)	5	6	14	13	18	11	11	8	8	8	8	13
Coaches	RV	24	16	12	10	8	6	13	11	18	12	10т	8	8	8	8	10
CFP	Not released										12	11	8	8	8	8	Not released

== Preseason ==
=== Award watch lists ===
Award	Player	Position	Year
Lott Trophy	R Mason Thomas	DL	So.
Dodd Trophy	Brent Venables	HC	
Maxwell Award	John Mateer	QB	Jr.
Maxwell Award	Jaydn Ott	RB	Jr.
Bronko Nagurski Trophy	Kip Lewis	LB	(redshirt) Jr.
Butkus Award	Kip Lewis	LB	(redshirt) Jr.
Wuerffel Trophy	Robert Spears-Jennings	S	Jr.
Lou Groza Award	Tate Sandell	PK	(redshirt) Jr.
Ray Guy Award	Jacob Ulrich	P	(redshirt) So.
Patrick Mannelly Award	Ben Anderson	LS	(redshirt) Jr.
Walter Camp Award	John Mateer	QB	Jr.
Doak Walker Award	Jaydn Ott	RB	Sr.
Davey O'Brien Award	John Mateer	QB	Jr.
Rotary Lombardi Award	R. Mason Thomas	DL	So.
Polynesian College Football Player Of The Year Award	Jaydn Ott	RB	Sr.
Johnny Unitas Golden Arm Award	John Mateer	QB	Jr.
Earl Campbell Tyler Rose Award	John Mateer	QB	Jr.

=== SEC media days ===
Oklahoma was predicted to finish tenth in the SEC preseason media poll. The Sooners received three first place votes.

== Game summaries ==
=== vs No. 6 (FCS) Illinois State ===
No. 6 (FCS) Illinois State Redbirds (0–0) at No. 18 Oklahoma Sooners (0–0) – Game summary

Quarter	1	2	3	4	Total
No. 6 (FCS) Redbirds	0	0	3	0	3
No. 18 Sooners	7	14	0	14	35

at Gaylord Family Oklahoma Memorial Stadium • Norman, OK

- Date: August 30
- Game time: 5:00 p.m.
- Game weather: • Cloudy Temperature: 79
- Game attendance: 83,218
- Referee: Marc Curles
- TV announcers (SECN+/ESPN+): Richard Cross (play-by-play), Tyoka Jackson (analyst), and Madison Hock (sideline)

Game information

First quarter

- OU – John Mateer 7–yard run (Tate Sandell kick), 0:39. Sooners 7–0. Drive: 10 plays, 94 yards, 5:04.

Second quarter

- OU – Deion Burks 27–yard pass from John Mateer (Tate Sandell kick), 11:50. Sooners 14–0. Drive: 4 plays, 77 yards, 1:08.
- OU - Tory Blaylock 5–yard run (Tate Sandell kick), 0:51. Sooners 21–0. Drive: 15 plays, 81 yards, 7:27.

Third quarter

- ILST – Matt Maldonado 33–yard field goal, 6:26. Sooners 21–3. Drive: 4 plays, 7 yards, 1:58.

Fourth quarter

- OU – Keontez Lewis 28–yard pass from John Mateer (Tate Sandell kick), 14:52. Sooners 28–3. Drive: 12 plays, 77 yards, 6:34.
- OU – Keontez Lewis 20–yard pass from John Mateer (Tate Sandell kick). 4:33. Sooners 35–3. Drive: 8 plays, 75 yards, 4:02.

Statistics	ILST	OU
First downs	8	24
Plays–yards	46–151	69–495
Rushes–yards	26–117	32–103
Passing yards	34	392
Passing: Comp–Att–Int	10–20–0	30–37–1
Turnovers	0	2
Time of possession	27:04	32:56

Team	Category	Player	Statistics
Illinois State	Passing	Tommy Rittenhouse	6/13, 22 yards
Illinois State	Rushing	Wenkers Wright	7 carries, 50 yards
Illinois State	Receiving	Scotty Presson Jr.	2 receptions, 8 yards
Oklahoma	Passing	John Mateer	30/37, 392 yards, 3 TD, INT
Oklahoma	Rushing	Tory Blaylock	8 carries, 44 yards, TD
Oklahoma	Receiving	Keontez Lewis	9 receptions, 119 yards, 2 TD

=== vs No. 15 Michigan ===
No. 15 Michigan Wolverines (1–0) at No. 18 Oklahoma Sooners (1–0) – Game summary

Quarter	1	2	3	4	Total
No. 15 Wolverines	0	0	13	0	13
No. 18 Sooners	7	7	7	3	24

at Gaylord Family Oklahoma Memorial Stadium • Norman, OK

- Date: September 6
- Game time: 6:30 p.m.
- Game weather: • Sunny Temperature: 76
- Game attendance: 84,107
- Referee: Mark Kluczynski
- TV announcers (ABC): Chris Fowler (play-by-play), Kirk Herbstreit (analyst), and Holly Rowe (sideline)

Game information

First quarter

- (10:00) OU – Deion Burks 9-yard pass from John Mateer, Tate Sandell kick (Drive: 12 plays, 75 yards, 5:00; OU 7–0)

Second quarter

- (0:22) OU – John Mateer 2-yard run, Tate Sandell kick (Drive: 10 plays, 80 yards, 2:55; OU 14–0)

Third quarter

- (14:49) MICH – Justice Haynes 75-yard run, Dominic Zvada kick (Drive: 1 play, 75 yards, 0:11; OU 14–7)
- (10:12) OU – John Mateer 10-yard run, Tate Sandell kick (Drive: 5 plays, 51 yards, 1:55; 'OU 21–7)
- (6:33) MICH – Dominic Zvada 42-yard field goal (Drive: 4 plays, 8 yards, 1:30; OU 21–10)
- (1:24) MICH – Dominic Zvada 35-yard field goal (Drive: 8 plays, 60 yards, 3:20; OU 21–13)

Fourth quarter

- (1:44) OU – Tate Sandell 21-yard field goal (Drive: 16 plays, 78 yards, 8:27; OU 24–13)

Statistics	MICH	OU
First downs	12	22
Plays–yards	56–288	74–408
Rushes–yards	32–146	40–138
Passing yards	142	270
Passing: Comp–Att–Int	9–24–0	21–34–1
Turnovers	0	2
Time of possession	27:48	32:12

Team	Category	Player	Statistics
Michigan	Passing	Bryce Underwood	9/24, 142 yards
Michigan	Rushing	Justice Haynes	19 carries, 125 yards, TD
Michigan	Receiving	Donaven McCulley	3 receptions, 91 yards
Oklahoma	Passing	John Mateer	21/34, 270 yards, TD, INT
Oklahoma	Rushing	John Mateer	19 carries, 74 yards, 2 TD
Oklahoma	Receiving	Deion Burks	7 receptions, 101 yards, TD

=== at Temple ===
No. 13 Oklahoma Sooners (2–0) at Temple Owls (2–0) – Game summary

Quarter	1	2	3	4	Total
No. 13 Sooners	11	17	14	0	42
Owls	0	3	0	0	3

at Lincoln Financial Field • Philadelphia, PA

- Date: September 13
- Game time: 11:00 a.m.
- Game weather: • Sunny Temperature: 77
- Game attendance: 24,927
- Referee: Ted Pitts
- TV announcers (ESPN2): Roy Philpott (play-by-play), Sam Acho (analyst), and Marilyn Payne (sideline)

Game information

First quarter

- (9:36) OU – Jovantae Barnes 3-yard run, Jacob Ulrich pass (Drive: 10 plays, 67 yards, 4:00; Oklahoma 8–0)
- (4:05) OU – Tate Sandell 52-yard field goal (Drive: 8 plays, 20 yards, 3:38; Oklahoma 11–0)

Second quarter

- (12:11) OU – Tory Blaylock 6-yard run, Tate Sandell kick (Drive: 12 plays, 89 yards, 4:34; Oklahoma 18–0)
- (10:05) OU – Tory Blaylock 18-yard run, Tate Sandell kick (Drive: 4 plays, 45 yards, 0:43; Oklahoma 25–0)
- (2:33) TEM – Carl Hardin 34-yard field goal (Drive: 4 plays, -3 yards, 1:03; Oklahoma 25–3)
- (0:27) OU – Tate Sandell 29-yard field goal (Drive: 10 plays, 54 yards, 2:06; Oklahoma 28–3)

Third quarter

- (7:57) OU – Xavier Robinson 6-yard pass from John Mateer, Tate Sandell kick (Drive: 6 plays, 65 yards, 1:20; Oklahoma 35–3)
- (5:47) OU – John Mateer 51-yard run, Tate Sandell kick (Drive: 2 plays, 76 yards, 0:43; Oklahoma 42–3)

Fourth quarter

- No scoring plays

Statistics	OU	TEM
First downs	29	7
Plays–yards	79–515	54–104
Rushes–yards	42–228	27–26
Passing yards	287	78
Passing: comp–att–int	21–37–1	14–27–0
Turnovers	1	0
Time of possession	32:16	27:44

Team	Category	Player	Statistics
Oklahoma	Passing	John Mateer	20/34, 282 yards, TD, INT
Oklahoma	Rushing	Tory Blaylock	14 carries, 100 yards, 2 TD
Oklahoma	Receiving	Isaiah Sategna III	7 receptions, 97 yards
Temple	Passing	Evan Simon	13/25, 75 yards
Temple	Rushing	Jay Ducker	7 carries, 24 yards
Temple	Receiving	Kajiya Hollawayne	2 receptions, 21 yards

=== vs No. 22 Auburn ===
No. 22 Auburn Tigers (3–0) at No. 11 Oklahoma Sooners (3–0) — Game summary

Quarter	1	2	3	4	Total
No. 22 Tigers	3	7	0	7	17
No. 11 Sooners	3	7	3	11	24

at Gaylord Family Oklahoma Memorial Stadium • Norman, OK

- Date: September 20
- Game time: 2:45 p.m.
- Game weather: • Sunny Temperature: 89
- Game attendance: 83,639
- Referee: Jeff Heaser
- TV announcers (ABC): Sean McDonough (play-by-play), Greg McElroy (analyst), and Molly McGrath (sideline)

Game information

First quarter

- OU – Tate Sandell 49-yard field goal, 8:32. Oklahoma 3–0. Drive: 12 plays, 39 yards, 4:29.
- AUB – Alex McPherson 24-yard field goal, 3:56. Tied 3–3. Drive: 10 plays, 87 yards, 4:31.

Second quarter

- OU – Isaiah Sategna III 24-yard pass from John Mateer (Tate Sandell kick), 10:45. Oklahoma 10–3. Drive: 2 plays, 12 yards, 0:50.
- AUB – Cam Coleman 2-yard pass from Jackson Arnold (Alex McPherson kick), 1:08. Tied 10–10. Drive: 8 plays, 60 yards, 3:17.

Third quarter

- OU – Tate Sandell 32-yard field goal, 8:36. Oklahoma 13–10. Drive: 11 plays, 46 yards, 4:21.

Fourth quarter

- OU – Tate Sandell 28-yard field goal, 14:56. Oklahoma 16–10. Drive: 8 plays, 58 yards, 3:09.
- AUB – Malcolm Simmons 4-yard run (Alex McPherson kick), 7:08. Auburn 17–16. Drive: 14 plays, 75 yards, 7:48.
- OU – John Mateer 9-yard run (2-pt conversion failed), 4:54. Oklahoma 22–17. Drive: 6 plays, 75 yards, 2:14.
- OU – R Mason Thomas safety, 1:06. Oklahoma 24–17.

Statistics	AUB	OU
First downs	18	16
Plays–yards	69–287	62–303
Rushes–yards	36–67	26–32
Passing yards	220	271
Passing: comp–att–int	21–33–0	24–36–0
Turnovers	0	1
Time of possession	35:34	24:26

Team	Category	Player	Statistics
Auburn	Passing	Jackson Arnold	21/32, 220 yards, TD
Auburn	Rushing	Jeremiah Cobb	6 carries, 61 yards
Auburn	Receiving	Eric Singleton Jr.	9 receptions, 60 yards
Oklahoma	Passing	John Mateer	24/36, 217 yards, TD
Oklahoma	Rushing	John Mateer	10 carries, 29 yards, TD
Oklahoma	Receiving	Isaiah Sategna III	9 receptions, 127 yards, TD

=== vs Kent State ===
Kent State Golden Flashes (1–3) at No 5. Oklahoma Sooners (4–0) — Game summary

Quarter	1	2	3	4	Total
Golden Flashes	0	0	0	0	0
No. 5 Sooners	10	13	21	0	44

at Gaylord Family Oklahoma Memorial Stadium • Norman, OK

- Date: October 4
- Game time: 3:00 p.m.
- Game weather: Sunny • Temperature: 86 °F (30 °C)
- Game attendance: 83,016
- Referee: Matt Loeffler
- TV announcers (SECN): Dave Neal (play-by-play), Fozzy Whittaker (analyst), and Morgan Uber (sideline)

Game information

First quarter

- (9:55) OU – Isaiah Sategna III 30-yard pass from Michael Hawkins Jr., Tate Sandell kick (Drive: 4 plays, 42 yards, 1:29; OU 7–0)
- (5:41) OU – Tate Sandell 49-yard field goal (Drive: 6 plays, 24 yards, 2:38; OU 10–0)

Second quarter

- (14:28) OU – Kaden Helms 3-yard pass from Michael Hawkins Jr., Tate Sandell kick (Drive: 9 plays, 74 yards, 4:11; OU 17–0)
- (9:09) OU – Tate Sandell 39-yard field goal (Drive: 7 plays, 32 yards, 3:40; OU 20–0)
- (0:56) OU – Tate Sandell 55-yard field goal (Drive: 10 plays, 42 yards, 3:59; OU 23–0)

Third quarter

- (10:17) OU – Gracen Halton 4-yard fumble return, Tate Sandell kick (Drive: 3 plays, -6 yards, 1:08; OU 30–0)
- (6:35) OU – Michael Hawkins Jr. 7-yard run, Tate Sandell kick (Drive: 3 plays, 18 yards, 1:02; OU 37–0)
- (3:55) OU – Isaiah Sategna III 9-yard pass from Michael Hawkins Jr., Tate Sandell kick (Drive: 6 plays, 30 yards, 2:28; OU 44–0)

Fourth quarter

- No scoring plays

Statistics	KENT	OU
First downs	7	23
Plays–yards	52–135	68–355
Rushes–yards	33–17	41–185
Passing yards	118	170
Passing: Comp–Att–Int	10–19–1	15–27–0
Turnovers	2	0
Time of possession	28:58	31:02

Team	Category	Player	Statistics
Kent State	Passing	Devin Kargman	8/16, 74 yards, INT
Kent State	Rushing	Jordan Nubin	7 carries, 18 yards
Kent State	Receiving	Wayne Harris	3 receptions, 18 yards
Oklahoma	Passing	Michael Hawkins Jr.	14/24, 162 yards, 3 TD
Oklahoma	Rushing	Tory Blaylock	15 carries, 78 yards
Oklahoma	Receiving	Isaiah Sategna III	4 receptions, 75 yards, 2 TD

=== vs. Texas (Red River Rivalry) ===
No. 6 Oklahoma Sooners (5–0) vs. Texas Longhorns (3–2) — Game summary

Quarter	1	2	3	4	Total
No. 6 Sooners	3	3	0	0	6
Longhorns	0	3	10	10	23

at Cotton Bowl • Dallas, TX

- Date: October 11
- Game time: 2:30 p.m.
- Game weather: Sunny • Temperature: 89 °F
- Game attendance: 92,100
- Referee: David Smith
- TV announcers (ABC): Chris Fowler (play-by-play), Kirk Herbstreit (analyst), and Holly Rowe (sideline)

Game information

First quarter

- (11:49) OU – Tate Sandell 42-yard field goal (Drive: 9 plays, 52 yards, 3:11; OU 3–0)

Second quarter

- (9:09) OU – Tate Sandell 41-yard field goal (Drive: 12 plays, 40 yards, 6:23; OU 6–0)
- (4:29) TEX – Mason Shipley 22-yard field goal (Drive: 12 plays, 75 yards, 4:45; OU 6–3)

Third quarter

- (7:49) TEX – DeAndre Moore Jr. 12-yard pass from Arch Manning, Mason Shipley kick (Drive: 14 plays, 75 yards, 7:11; TEX 10–6)
- (0:21) TEX – Mason Shipley 48-yard field goal (Drive: 13 plays, 65 yards, 6:21; TEX 13–6)

Fourth quarter

- (9:54) TEX – Ryan Niblett 75-yard punt return, Mason Shipley kick (Drive: 4 plays, -11 yards, 1:39; TEX 20–6)
- (2:59) TEX – Mason Shipley 39-yard field goal (Drive: 7 plays, 42 yards, 2:37; TEX 23–6)

Statistics	OU	TEX
First downs	16	15
Plays–yards	69–258	62–302
Rushes–yards	30–48	35–136
Passing yards	210	166
Passing: Comp–Att–Int	21–39–3	21–27–0
Turnovers	3	0
Time of possession	29:02	30:58

Team	Category	Player	Statistics
Oklahoma	Passing	John Mateer	20/38, 202 yards, 3 INT
Oklahoma	Rushing	Tory Blaylock	11 carries, 33 yards
Oklahoma	Receiving	Deion Burks	5 receptions, 64 yards
Texas	Passing	Arch Manning	21/27, 166 yards, TD
Texas	Rushing	Quintrevion Wisner	22 carries, 94 yards
Texas	Receiving	DeAndre Moore Jr.	3 receptions, 50 yards, TD

=== at South Carolina ===
No. 14 Oklahoma Sooners (5–1) at South Carolina Gamecocks (3–3) — Game summary

Quarter	1	2	3	4	Total
No. 14 Sooners	7	7	10	2	26
Gamecocks	0	7	0	0	7

at Williams–Brice Stadium • Columbia, SC

- Date: October 18
- Game time: 11:45 a.m.
- Game weather: Sunny • Temperature: 89 °F
- Game attendance: 78,680
- Referee: Lee Hedrick
- TV announcers (SECN): Taylor Zarzour (play-by-play), Matt Stinchcomb (analyst), and Alyssa Lang (sideline)

Game information

First quarter

- OU – Tory Blaylock 18-yard run (Tate Sandell kick), 9:42. Sooners 7–0. Drive: 10 plays, 75 yards, 5:18.

Second quarter

- OU – Xavier Robinson 10-yard run (Tate Sandell kick), 9:21. Sooners 14–0. Drive: 13 plays, 92 yards, 5:17.
- SC – Nyck Harbor 2-yard pass from LaNorris Sellers (William Joyce kick), 1:43. Sooners 14–7. Drive: 11 plays, 47 yards, 4:06.

Third quarter

- OU – Tate Sandell 55-yard field goal, 6:01. Sooners 17–7. Drive: 4 plays, 16 yards, 2:06.
- OU – Isaiah Sategna III 20-yard pass from John Mateer (Tate Sandell kick), 2:06. Sooners 24–7. Drive: 5 plays, 49 yards, 2:10.

Fourth quarter

- OU – Marcus Strong Safety, 4:22. Sooners 26–7.

Statistics	OU	SC
First downs	20	15
Plays–yards	67–319	67–224
Rushes–yards	40–171	34–54
Passing yards	148	170
Passing: comp–att–int	19–27–0	21–33–2
Turnovers	0	2
Time of possession	33:38	26:22

Team	Category	Player	Statistics
Oklahoma	Passing	John Mateer	19/27, 148 yards, TD
Oklahoma	Rushing	Tory Blaylock	19 carries, 101 yards, TD
Oklahoma	Receiving	Isaiah Sategna III	7 receptions, 73 yards, TD
South Carolina	Passing	LaNorris Sellers	17/25, 124 yards, TD
South Carolina	Rushing	Rahsul Faison	10 carries, 50 yards
South Carolina	Receiving	Jayden Sellers	6 receptions, 57 yards

=== vs No. 8 Ole Miss ===
No. 8 Ole Miss Rebels (6–1) at No. 13 Oklahoma Sooners (6–1) — Game summary

Quarter	1	2	3	4	Total
No. 8 Rebels	10	12	3	9	34
No.13 Sooners	3	7	16	0	26

at Gaylord Family Oklahoma Memorial Stadium • Norman, OK

- Date: October 25
- Game time: 11:00 a.m.
- Game weather: Sunny
- Game attendance: 83,468
- Referee: Matt Loeffler
- TV announcers (ABC): Sean McDonough (play-by-play), Greg McElroy (analyst), and Molly McGrath (sideline)

Game information

First quarter

- (12:30) MISS – Lucas Carneiro 45-yard field goal (Drive: 8 plays, 47 yards, 2:30; MISS 3–0)
- (8:52) OU – Tate Sandell 42-yard field goal (Drive: 8 plays, 51 yards, 3:38; Tied 3–3)
- (6:07) MISS – Kewan Lacy 28-yard run, Lucas Carneiro kick (Drive: 8 plays, 75 yards, 2:45; MISS 10–3)

Second quarter

- (14:04) OU – Isaiah Sategna III 76-yard pass from John Mateer, Tate Sandell kick (Drive: 3 plays, 83 yards, 1:39; Tied 10–10)
- (10:51) MISS – Safety (Drive: 1 plays, -5 yards, 0:34; MISS 12–10)
- (7:33) MISS – Lucas Carneiro 22-yard field goal (Drive: 12 plays, 47 yards, 3:11; MISS 15–10)
- (0:46) MISS – Kewan Lacy 2 yard-run, Lucas Carneiro kick (Drive: 9 plays, 49 yards, 3:46; MISS 22–10)

Third quarter

- (11:16) OU – Tate Sandell 42-yard field goal (Drive: 4 plays, -9 yards, 1:30; MISS 22–13)
- (5:57) MISS – Lucas Carneiro 39-yard field goal (Drive: 14 plays, 63 yards, 5:19; MISS 25–13)
- (5:45) OU – Xavier Robinson 65-yard run, Tate Sandell kick (Drive: 1 play, 65 yards, 0:12; MISS 25–20)
- (1:04) OU – Xavier Robinson 9-yard run, 2-point pass failed (Drive: 7 plays, 60 yards, 3:40; OU 26–25)

Fourth quarter

- (11:33) MISS – Trace Bruckler 8-yard pass from Trinidad Chambliss, 2-point pass failed (Drive: 11 plays, 75 yards, 4:31; MISS 31–26)
- (4:09) MISS – Lucas Carneiro 37-yard field goal (Drive: 5 plays, 33 yards, 2:55; MISS 34–26)

Statistics	MISS	OU
First downs	21	14
Plays–yards	87–431	60–359
Rushes–yards	41–116	28–136
Passing yards	315	223
Passing: comp–att–int	24–46–0	17–32–0
Turnovers	0	1
Time of possession	35:36	24:24

Team	Category	Player	Statistics
Ole Miss	Passing	Trinidad Chambliss	24/44, 315 yards, TD
Ole Miss	Rushing	Kewan Lacy	27 carries, 78 yards, 2 TD
Ole Miss	Receiving	Harrison Wallace III	5 receptions, 64 yards
Oklahoma	Passing	John Mateer	17/31, 223 yards, TD
Oklahoma	Rushing	Xavier Robinson	9 carries, 109 yards, 2 TD
Oklahoma	Receiving	Isaiah Sategna III	6 receptions, 131 yards, TD

=== at No. 14 Tennessee ===
No. 18 Oklahoma Sooners (6–2) at No.14 Tennessee Volunteers (6–2) — Game summary

Quarter	1	2	3	4	Total
No. 18 Sooners	7	9	7	10	33
No. 14 Volunteers	10	0	7	10	27

at Neyland Stadium • Knoxville, TN

- Date: November 1
- Game time: 6:30 p.m.
- Game weather: clear • Temperature: 56 °F
- Game attendance: 101,915
- Referee: Jason Autrey
- TV announcers (ABC): Chris Fowler (play-by-play), Kirk Herbstreit (analyst), and Holly Rowe (sideline)

Game information

First quarter

- (11:17) TENN – Braylon Staley 5-yard pass from Joey Aguilar, Max Gilbert kick (Drive: 9 plays, 75 yards, 3:43; TENN 7–0)
- (8:01) OU – R Mason Thomas 71-yard fumble recovery, Tate Sandell kick (Drive: 5 plays, -16 yards, 1:29; Tied 7–7)
- (3:30) TENN – Max Gilbert 45-yard field goal (Drive: 11 plays, 48 yards, 4:31; TENN 10–7)

Second quarter

- (7:36) OU – Tate Sandell 55-yard field goal (Drive: 8 plays, 43 yards, 3:38; Tied 10–10)
- (1:08) OU – Tate Sandell 51-yard field goal (Drive: 7 plays, 26 yards, 2:33; OU 13–10)
- (0:00) OU – Tate Sandell 40-yard field goal (Drive: 3 plays, 6 yards, 0:16; OU 16–10)

Third quarter

- (11:52) TENN – Braylon Staley 54-yard pass from Joey Aguilar, Max Gilbert kick (Drive: 5 plays, 83 yards, 1:18; TENN 17–16)
- (2:03) OU – Xavier Robinson 4-yard run, Tate Sandell kick (Drive: 5 plays, 52 yards, 2:48; OU 23–17)

Fourth quarter

- (11:05) OU – Tate Sandell 55-yard field goal (Drive: 9 plays, 38 yards, 4:46; OU 26–17)
- (1:56) TENN – Mike Matthews 15-yard pass from Joey Aguilar, Max Gilbert kick (Drive: 6 plays, 55 yards, 2:22; OU 26–24)
- (1:44) OU – John Mateer 1-yard run, Tate Sandell kick (Drive: 2 plays, 44 yards, 0:11; OU 33–24)
- (0:47) TENN – Max Gilbert 48-yard field goal (Drive: 7 plays, 45 yards, 0:57; OU 33–27)

Statistics	OU	TENN
First downs	19	28
Plays–yards	64–351	80–456
Rushes–yards	35–192	35–63
Passing yards	159	393
Passing: Comp–Att–Int	19–29–1	29–45–2
Turnovers	2	3
Time of possession	30:07	29:53

Team	Category	Player	Statistics
Oklahoma	Passing	John Mateer	19/29, 159 yards, INT
Oklahoma	Rushing	Xavier Robinson	16 carries, 115 yards, TD
Oklahoma	Receiving	Isaiah Sategna III	6 receptions, 68 yards
Tennessee	Passing	Joey Aguilar	29/45, 393 yards, 3 TD, 2 INT
Tennessee	Rushing	DeSean Bishop	12 carries, 38 yards
Tennessee	Receiving	Chris Brazzell II	6 receptions, 68 yards

=== at No. 4 Alabama ===
No. 11 Oklahoma Sooners (7–2) at No. 4 Alabama Crimson Tide (8–1) — Game summary

Quarter	1	2	3	4	Total
No. 11 Sooners	10	7	3	3	23
No. 4 Crimson Tide	0	14	7	0	21

at Bryant–Denny Stadium • Tuscaloosa, AL

- Date: November 15
- Game time: 2:30 p.m.
- Game weather: Sunny • Temperature: 76 °F (24 °C) • Wind: NE at 13 miles per hour (21 km/h)
- Game attendance: 100,077
- Referee: Daniel Gautreaux
- TV announcers (ABC): Sean McDonough (play-by-play), Greg McElroy (analyst), and Molly McGrath (sideline)

Game information

First quarter

- (11:33) OU – Tate Sandell 25-yard field goal (Drive: 5 plays, 23 yards, 1:57; OU 3–0)
- (2:03) OU – Eli Bowen 87-yard interception return, Tate Sandell kick (Drive: 9 plays, 57 yards, 4:08; OU 10–0)

Second quarter

- (10:36) ALA – Daniel Hill 1-yard run, Conor Talty kick (Drive: 12 plays, 72 yards, 6:21; OU 10–7)
- (8:49) OU – John Mateer 20-yard run, Tate Sandell kick (Drive: 2 plays, 31 yards, 0:45; OU 17–7)
- (6:13) ALA – Josh Cuevas 25-yard pass from Ty Simpson, Conor Talty kick (Drive: 6 plays, 78 yards, 2:28; OU 17–14)

Third quarter

- (10:42) OU – Tate Sandell 52-yard field goal (Drive: 8 plays, 41 yards, 4:22; OU 20–14)
- (7:27) ALA – Daniel Hill 1-yard run, Connor Talty kick (Drive: 7 plays, 75 yards, 3:11; ALA 21–20)
- (13:42) OU – Tate Sandell 24-yard field goal (Drive: 5 plays, 22 yards, 2:09; OU 23–21)

Fourth quarter

No scoring plays

Statistics	OU	ALA
First downs	12	23
Plays–yards	51–212	75–406
Rushes–yards	28–74	33–80
Passing yards	138	326
Passing: comp–att–int	15–23–0	28–42–1
Turnovers	0	3
Time of possession	25:32	34:28

Team	Category	Player	Statistics
Oklahoma	Passing	John Mateer	15/23, 138 yards
Oklahoma	Rushing	Xavier Robinson	10 carries, 34 yards
Oklahoma	Receiving	Jer'Michael Carter	3 receptions, 36 yards
Alabama	Passing	Ty Simpson	28/42, 326 yards, TD, INT
Alabama	Rushing	Daniel Hill	15 carries, 60 yards, 2 TD
Alabama	Receiving	Josh Cuevas	6 receptions, 80 yards, TD

=== vs No. 22 Missouri (rivalry) ===
No. 22 Missouri Tigers (7–3) at No. 8 Oklahoma Sooners (8–2) — Game summary

Quarter	1	2	3	4	Total
No. 22 Tigers	3	3	0	0	6
No. 8 Sooners	0	14	3	0	17

at Gaylord Family Oklahoma Memorial Stadium • Norman, OK

- Date: November 22
- Game time: 11:00 a.m.
- Game weather: Cloudy • Temperature: 49 °F (9 °C) • Wind: NW at 9 miles per hour (14 km/h)
- Game attendance: 83,541
- Referee: David Smith
- TV announcers (ABC): Sean McDonough (play-by-play), Greg McElroy (analyst) and Molly McGrath (sideline)

Game information

First quarter

- (6:37) MIZ – Robert Meyer 39-yard field goal (Drive: 14 plays, 54 yards, 8:23; MIZ 3–0)

Second quarter

- (6:45) OU – Isaiah Sategna III 87-yard pass from John Mateer, Tate Sandell kick (Drive: 3 plays, 90 yards, 0:52; OU 7–3)
- (2:22) OU – Javonnie Gibson 8-yard pass from John Mateer, Tate Sandell kick (Drive: 7 plays, 35 yards, 2:22; OU 14–3)
- (0:17) MIZ – Robert Meyer 21-yard field goal (Drive: 10 plays, 77 yards, 2:02; OU 14–6)

Third quarter

- (11:36) OU – Tate Sandell-45 yard field goal (Drive: 8 plays, 47 yards, 3:24; OU 17–6)

Fourth quarter

- No scoring plays.

Statistics	MIZ	OU
First downs	19	14
Plays–yards	71–301	62–276
Rushes–yards	35–70	32–103
Passing yards	231	173
Passing: comp–att–int	20–36–2	14–30–0
Turnovers	2	0
Time of possession	32:48	27:12

Team	Category	Player	Statistics
Missouri	Passing	Beau Pribula	20/36, 231 yards, 2 INT
Missouri	Rushing	Ahmad Hardy	17 carries, 57 yards
Missouri	Receiving	Kevin Coleman Jr.	7 receptions, 115 yards
Oklahoma	Passing	John Mateer	14/30, 173 yards, 2 TD
Oklahoma	Rushing	John Mateer	18 carries, 60 yards
Oklahoma	Receiving	Xavier Robinson	4 receptions, 16 yards

=== vs LSU ===
LSU Tigers (7–4) at No. 8 Oklahoma Sooners (9–2) — Game summary

Quarter	1	2	3	4	Total
Tigers	0	3	7	3	13
No. 8 Sooners	3	0	7	7	17

at Gaylord Family Oklahoma Memorial Stadium • Norman, OK

- Date: November 29
- Game time: 2:30 p.m.
- Game weather: Sunny • Temperature: 54 °F (12 °C)
- Game attendance: 83,734
- Referee: Kyle Olson
- TV announcers (ABC): Mark Jones (play-by-play), Roddy Jones (analyst) and Quint Kessenich (sideline)

Game information

First quarter

- (4:31) OU – Tate Sandell 38-yard field goal (Drive: 11 plays, 53 yards, 5:01; OU 3–0)

Second quarter

- (13:35) LSU – Damian Ramos 25-yard field goal (Drive: 6 plays, 42 yards, 1:53; Tied 3–3)

Third quarter

- (11:21) LSU – Zavion Thomas 1-yard pass from Michael Van Buren Jr., Damian Ramos kick (Drive: 4 plays, 33 yards, 2:03; LSU 10–3)
- (1:47) OU – Deion Burks 45-yard pass from John Mateer, Tate Sandell kick (Drive: 2 plays, 45 yards, 0:43; Tied 10–10)

Fourth quarter

- (7:56) LSU – Damian Ramos 43-yard field goal (Drive: 8 plays, 42 yards, 4:38; LSU 13–10)
- (4:16) OU – Isaiah Sategna III 58-yard pass from John Mateer, Tate Sandell kick (Drive: 3 plays, 84 yards, 0:48; OU 17–13)

Statistics	LSU	OU
First downs	9	14
Plays–yards	55–198	66–393
Rushes–yards	29–85	28–75
Passing yards	113	318
Passing: comp–att–int	15–26–1	23–38–3
Turnovers	1	3
Time of possession	29:19	30:41

Team	Category	Player	Statistics
LSU	Passing	Michael Van Buren Jr.	14/25, 96 yards, TD, INT
LSU	Rushing	Caden Durham	6 carries, 42 yards
LSU	Receiving	Zavion Thomas	3 receptions, 30 yards, TD
Oklahoma	Passing	John Mateer	23/38, 318 yards, 2 TD, 3 INT
Oklahoma	Rushing	Tory Blaylock	11 carries, 42 yards
Oklahoma	Receiving	Isaiah Sategna III	9 receptions, 121 yards, TD

=== vs No. 9 Alabama (College Football Playoff – First Round) ===
CFP First Round Game
No. 9 Alabama Crimson Tide (10–3) at No. 8 Oklahoma Sooners (10–2) — Game summary

Quarter	1	2	3	4	Total
No. 9 Crimson Tide	0	17	10	7	34
No. 8 Sooners	10	7	0	7	24

at Gaylord Family Oklahoma Memorial Stadium • Norman, OK

- Date: December 19
- Game time: 7:00 p.m.
- Game weather: Sunny • Temperature: 56 °F (13 °C) • Wind: N at 20 miles per hour (32 km/h)
- Game attendance: 83,550
- Referee: Kloe Knueppel (Big Ten)
- TV announcers (ABC/ESPN): Chris Fowler (play-by-play), Kirk Herbstreit (analyst), Holly Rowe and Laura Rutledge (sideline)
- Recap

Game information

First quarter

- (5:29) OU – John Mateer 8-yard run, Tate Sandell kick (Drive: 8 plays, 59 yards, 3:34; OU 7–0)
- (0:45) OU – Tate Sandell 51-yard field goal (Drive: 6 plays, 13 yards, 3:00; OU 10–0)

Second quarter

- (10:51) OU – Isaiah Sategna III 7-yard pass from John Mateer, Tate Sandell kick (Drive: 8 plays, 63 yards, 3:57; OU 17–0)
- (6:52) ALA – Lotzeir Brooks 10-yard pass from Ty Simpson, Conor Talty kick (Drive: 9 plays, 75 yards, 3:59; OU 17–7)
- (2:08) ALA – Conor Talty 35-yard field goal (Drive: 5 plays, 13 yards, 2:15; OU 17–10)
- (1:18) ALA – Zabien Brown 50-yard interception return, Conor Talty kick (Drive: 4 plays, 24 yards, 0:50; Tied 17–17)

Third quarter

- (11:21) ALA – Lotzeir Brooks 30-yard pass from Ty Simpson, Conor Talty kick (Drive: 3 plays, 60 yards, 00:58; ALA 24–17)
- (4:30) ALA – Conor Talty 40-yard field goal (Drive: 9 plays, 40 yards, 4:56; ALA 27–17)

Fourth quarter

- (14:45) OU – Deion Burks 37-yard pass from John Mateer, Tate Sandell kick (Drive: 8 plays, 75 yards, 4:45; ALA 27–24)
- (7:24) ALA – Daniel Hill 6-yard run, Conor Talty kick (Drive: 4 plays, 35 yards, 1:56; ALA 24–34)

Statistics	ALA	OU
First downs	12	18
Plays–yards	54–260	75–362
Rushes–yards	25–28	33–55
Passing yards	232	307
Passing: Comp–Att–Int	18–29–0	26–42–1
Turnovers	0	1
Time of possession	26:52	33:08

Team	Category	Player	Statistics
Alabama	Passing	Ty Simpson	18/29, 232 yards, 2 TD
Alabama	Rushing	Daniel Hill	9 carries, 43 yards, TD
Alabama	Receiving	Lotzeir Brooks	5 receptions, 79 yards, 2 TD
Oklahoma	Passing	John Mateer	26/41, 307 yards, 2 TD, INT
Oklahoma	Rushing	Tory Blaylock	11 carries, 36 yards
Oklahoma	Receiving	Deion Burks	7 receptions, 107 yards, TD

== Personnel ==
=== Coaching staff ===
Name	Position	Consecutive years
Brent Venables	Head coach	4th
Ben Arbuckle	Offensive Coordinator/Quarterbacks	1st
Todd Bates	Associate head coach/Co-defensive coordinator/Run defense/Defensive tackles	4th
Bill Bedenbaugh	Offensive line	13th
Miguel Chavis	Defensive ends	4th
Doug Deakin	Special Team Coordinator	1st
Nate Dreiling	Inside Linebackers Coach	1st
Joe Jon Finley	Tight ends	3rd
Brandon Hall	Safeties	4th
Emmett Jones	Passing game coordinator/Wide receivers	3rd
DeMarco Murray	Running backs	6th
Jay Valai	Assistant Head Coach for Defense/ Co-defensive coordinator/Pass defense/Cornerbacks & nickelbacks	3rd
Wes Goodwin	Assistant Linebackers/Outside Linebackers	1st
Jerry Schmidt	Director of sports enhancement & strength and conditioning	4th
Source: 2025 Oklahoma Sooners Roster

=== Roster ===
2025 Oklahoma Sooners Football
Quarterback: 3 Michael Hawkins Jr. – sophomore (6'1, 206); 10 John Mateer – (redshirt) junior (6'1, 224); 15 Jett Niu – freshman (6'2, 198); 16 Whitt Newbauer – sophomore (6'6, 231); Running back: 0 Jaydn Ott – senior (6'0, 208); 2 Jovantae Barnes – senior (6'0, 211); 6 Tory Blaylock – freshman (5'11, 203); 8 Taylor Tatum – sophomore (5'10, 212); 21 Xavier Robinson – sophomore (6'0, 239); 25 Andy Bass – (redshirt) freshman (5'11, 205); 29 Gabę Sawchuk – (redshirt) freshman (5'10, 196); Wide receiver: 1 Jayden Gibson – (redshirt) junior (6'5, 186); 4 Deion Burks – (redshirt) senior (5'9, 188); 5 Isaiah Sategna III – (redshirt) junior (5'10, 182); 7 Zion Kearney – sophomore (6'1, 207); 9 Keontez Lewis – (redshirt) senior (6'2, 197); 11 Javonnie Gibson – (redshirt) junior (6'2, 211); 13 Zion Ragins – sophomore (5'8, 153); 14 Elijah Thomas – freshman (6'0, 194); 17 Josiah Martin – sophomore (5'11, 163); 21 Manny Choice – freshman (6'4, 212); 28 KJ Daniels – (redshirt) freshman (5'9, 165); 80 Jakeb Snyder – (redshirt) sophomore (5'8, 177); 82 Ivan Carreon – (redshirt) sophomore (6'6, 224); 83 Major Melson – (redshirt) senior (5'10, 190); 84 Jer'Michael Carter – (redshirt) junior (6'4, 192); 85 Trey Brown – (redshirt) sophomore (5'9, 180); 88 Jacob Jordan – sophomore (5'9, 181); 89 Eli Merck – (redshirt) sophomore (5'11, 200); Tight end: 12 Jaren Kanak – senior (6'2, 233); 18 Kaden Helms – (redshirt) junior (6'5, 238); 19 Kade McIntyre – (redshirt) sophomore (6'3, 228); 22 Trynae Washington – freshman (6'4, 248); 44 John Locke Jr. – (redshirt) junior (6'4, 252); 81 Will Huggins – (redshirt) senior (6'6, 252); 86 Carson Kent – (redshirt) junior (6'4, 247); Long snapper: 49 Ben Anderson – (redshirt) junior (6'5, 241); 50 Seth Freeman – freshman (6'0, 240)	Offensive line: 52 Troy Everett – – (redshirt) senior (6'3, 315); 54 Febechi Nwaiwu – – (redshirt) senior (6'4, 326); 55 Eddy Pierre–Louis – – sophomore (6'3, 314); 56 Michael Fasusi – – freshman (6'5, 309); 57 Gunnar Allen – – (redshirt) junior (6'1, 295); 64 Sean Hutton – – freshman (6'0, 299); 66 Derek Simmons – – (redshirt) senior (6'5, 317); 68 Owen Hollenbeck – – freshman (6'3, 347); 69 Jake Maikkula – — (redshirt) junior (6'5, 299); 70 Ryan Fodje – – freshman (6'5, 322); 71 Logan Howland – – (redshirt) sophomore (6'6, 322); 73 Isiah Autry-Dent – – (redshirt) freshman (6'6, 318); 74 Draius Afalava – – freshman (6'4, 353); 75 Daniel Akikunmi – – (redshirt) freshman (6'6, 324); 76 Jacob Sexton – – senior (6'6, 330); 77 Heath Ozaeta – – (redshirt) sophomore (6'5, 311); 78 Luke Baklenko – – junior (6'6, 313); 79 Jake Taylor – – (redshirt) junior (6'6, 313); Defensive line: 0 David Stone – DT – sophomore (6'3, 310); 6 Nigel Smith II – DE – (redshirt) freshman (6'4, 290); 8 Marvin Jones Jr. – DL – senior (6'5, 262); 16 Danny Okoye – DE – (redshirt) freshman (6'3, 251); 32 R Mason Thomas – DE – senior (6'2, 249); 34 Adepoju Adebawore – DE – junior (6'4, 261); 42 Wyatt Gilmore – DE – (redshirt) freshman (6'4, 254); 44 Taylor Wein – DE – (redshirt) sophomore (6'4, 276); 52 Damonic Williams – DT – senior (6'1, 323); 54 David Rowaiye – DL– (redshirt) junior (6'5, 312); 56 Gracen Halton – DT – senior (6'2, 292); 65 Jayden Jackson – DT – sophomore (6'2, 322); 80 Bergin Kysar – DL – (redshirt) freshman (6'3, 245); 88 CJ Nickson – DL – freshman (6'3, 254); 90 Trent Wilson – DL – freshman (6'3, 307); 92 Jacob Henry – DL – (redshirt) freshman (6'2, 295); 93 Ace Hodges – DT – (redshirt) freshman (6'1, 301); 96 Siolaa Lolohea – DT — (redshirt) sophomore (6'3, 300); 97 Alex Shieldnight – DL – freshman (6'2, 254); 99 Markus Strong – DL – (redshirt) sophomore (6'3, 297)	Linebacker: 5 Kendal Daniels – (redshirt) senior (6'5, 242); 7 Samuel Omosigho – junior (6'1, 235); 10 Kip Lewis – (redshirt) junior (6'1, 227); 11 Kobie McKinzie – (redshirt) junior (6'2, 236); 17 Taylor Heim – (redshirt) sophomore (6'6, 227); 26 Elgee Webster – freshman (5'11, 205); 28 Marcus James – freshman (6'4, 235); 31 Reed DeQuasie – (redshirt) sophomore (6'1, 202); 38 Owen Heinecke – (redshirt) junior (6'1, 227); 41 Barrett Travis – freshman (6'0, 206); 47 James Nesta – (redshirt) freshman (6'3, 230); Defensive back: 1 Jaydan Hardy – DB – sophomore (5'10, 180); 2 Omarion Robinson – DB – freshman (5'11, 202); 3 Robert Spears-Jennings – S – senior (6'0, 213); 4 Courtland Guillory – DB – freshman (6'0, 183); 9 Gentry Williams – DB – (redshirt) junior (5'11, 187); 12 Devon Jordan – DB – sophomore (5'11, 181); 13 Reggie Powers III – DB – sophomore (5'11, 214); 14 Tristan Hayes – DB – freshman (6'1, 185); 15 Kendal Dolby – DB – (redshirt) senior (5'10, 194); 19 Jacobe Johnson – DB – junior (6'2, 208); 20 Casen Calmus – DB – (redshirt) sophomore (5'10, 198); 21 Jeremiah Newcombe – DB – (redshirt) freshman (5'9, 185); 22 Peyton Bowen – DB – junior (6'0, 201); 23 Eli Bowen – DB – sophomore (5'9, 183); 24 Marcus Wimberly – DB – freshman (6'1, 193); 25 Michael Boganowski – DB – sophomore (6'2, 207); 27 Preston Mickens – DB – (redshirt) freshman (5'10, 193); 33 Jocelyn Malaska – DB — (redshirt) junior (6'1, 190); 37 Maliek Hawkins – DB – (redshirt) freshman (6'0, 189); Placekicker: 29 Tate Sandell – (redshirt) junior (5'9, 182); 33 Preston Tarpley – freshman (6'1, 195); 35 Liam Evans – (redshirt) freshman (5'7, 173); 43 Grayson Miller – (redshirt) junior (5'9, 195); 99 Austin Welch – (redshirt) senior (5'10, 175); Punter: 87 Jacob Ulrich – (redshirt) sophomore (6'5, 206)

=== Outgoing transfers ===
Player	Position	Height	Weight	Year	New team
Jaquaize Pettaway	WR	5'10	194	Sophomore	East Carolina
Jackson Arnold	QB	6'1	210	Sophomore	Auburn
Nic Anderson	WR	6'4	216	Redshirt sophomore	LSU
Kalib Hicks	RB	5'11	209	Redshirt freshman	Oklahoma State
Emeka Megwa	RB	6'0	213	Redshirt junior	UNLV
Evan McClure	IOL	6'4	273	Freshman	Oklahoma
Bauer Sharp	TE	6'4	243	Redshirt junior	LSU
Erik McCarty	DB	6'1	186	Redshirt freshman	Emporia State
Geirean Hatchett	OL	6'5	318	Redshirt senior	Washington
Jayden Rowe	DB	6'2	221	Redshirt sophomore	Kansas State
Kani Walker	DB	6'2	206	Redshirt junior	Arkansas
Chapman McKown	RB	5'5	171	Redshirt freshman	Central Arkansas
Makari Vickers	DB	6'1	187	Sophomore	Colorado
J.J. Hester	WR	6'4	203	Redshirt senior	Kentucky
Joshua Bates	OL	6'3	309	Redshirt freshman	SMU
Jalil Farooq	WR	6'1	208	Senior	Maryland
Josh Fanuiel	TE	6'3	251	Redshirt sophomore	
Andrel Anthony	WR	6'1	186	Senior	Duke
Phil Picciotti	LB	6'3	245	Redshirt freshman	UCF
Dasan McCullough	LB	6'5	235	Junior	Nebraska
Brendan Zurbrugg	QB	6'2	207	Freshman	Utah
Brenen Thompson	WR	5'9	168	Junior	Mississippi State
Eugene Brooks	OL	6'3	336	Freshman	UCLA
Ashton Sanders	DL	6'1	297	Redshirt freshman	UCLA
Ashton Logan	P	6'2	185	Junior	Middle Tennessee
Steele Wasel	QB	6'3	228	Redshirt freshman	
Davon Sears	DL	6'3	280	Redshirt senior	
Lewis Carter	LB	6'0	224	Sophomore	UCF
Cole Gonzales	QB	6'0	195	Senior	Pittsburgh
Sam Franklin	RB	5'10	180	Freshmen	USF
Davon Mitchell	TE	6'3	220	Freshmen	Louisville
Jocelyn Malaska	CB	6'2	170	(redshirt) Sophomore	Abilene Christian
Peter Schuh	S	5'8	186	(redshirt) Sophomore	Marshall
Mykel Patterson-McDonald	CB	5'9.5	175	Sophomore	
Gavin Sawchuk	RB	5'11	197	(redshirt) Sophomore	Florida State

=== Incoming transfers ===
Player	Position	Height	Weight	Year	Former team
Jacob Ulrich	P	6'5	205	Redshirt sophomore	Kennesaw State
Javonnie Gibson	WR	6'3	205	Redshirt sophomore	Arkansas–Pine Bluff
Luke Baklenko	OL	6'6	305	Sophomore	Stanford
John Mateer	QB	6'1	219	Redshirt sophomore	Washington State
Keontez Lewis	WR	6'2	190	Junior	Southern Illinois
Derek Simmons	OL	6'6	325	Senior	Western Carolina
Isaiah Sategna	WR	5'11	185	Redshirt sophomore	Arkansas
Carson Kent	TE	6'4	240	Redshirt junior	Kennesaw State
Cole Gonzales	QB	6'0	195	Junior	Western Carolina
Will Huggins	TE	6'7	235	Redshirt junior	Pittsburg State
Josiah Martin	WR	5'11	170	Freshman	California
Austin Welch	K	5'11	170	Redshirt senior	Kennesaw State
Marvin Jones Jr.	DL	6'5	255	Junior	Florida State
Kendal Daniels	S	6'4	235	Redshirt junior	Oklahoma State
John Locke	TE	6'4	241	Redshirt sophomore	Louisiana Tech
Jake Maikkula	IOL	6'5	265	Junior	Stanford
Jaydn Ott	RB	6'0	205	Senior	California
Ricky Lolohea	DL	6'4	250	Redshirt freshman	Utah State
Tate Sandell	K	5'10	155	Redshirt junior	UTSA
Jer'Michael Carter	WR	6'4	192	Redshirt sophomore	McNeese State
Whitt Newbauer	QB	6'6	225	Freshmen	Mercer
Reed DeQuasie	S	6'1	202	Redshirt sophomore	Oklahoma State

=== Recruiting ===
College recruiting
Name	Hometown	School	Height	Weight	Commit date
Michael Fasusi; OT	Lewisville, TX	Lewisville High School	6 ft 5 in (1.96 m)	299 lb (136 kg)	Aug 21, 2024
Michael Fasusi; OT	Recruit ratings: Rivals: 247Sports: ESPN: (91)				
Ryan Fodje; OT	Cypress, TX	Bridgeland High School	6 ft 5 in (1.96 m)	295 lb (134 kg)	Feb 4, 2024
Ryan Fodje; OT	Recruit ratings: Rivals: 247Sports: ESPN: (81)				
Elijah Thomas; WR	Checotah, OK	Checotah High School	6 ft 0 in (1.83 m)	180 lb (82 kg)	Jul 27, 2023
Elijah Thomas; WR	Recruit ratings: Rivals: 247Sports: ESPN: (82)				
CJ Nickson; EDGE	Weatherford, OK	Weatherford High School	6 ft 0 in (1.83 m)	180 lb (82 kg)	Jul 27, 2023
CJ Nickson; EDGE	Recruit ratings: Rivals: 247Sports: ESPN: (83)				
Trent Wilson; DL	Upper Marlboro, MD	Dr. Henry Wise High School	6 ft 2.5 in (1.89 m)	260 lb (120 kg)	Apr 10, 2024
Trent Wilson; DL	Recruit ratings: Rivals: 247Sports: ESPN: (82)				
Trystan Haynes; CB	Midwest City, OK	Carl Albert High School	6 ft 2 in (1.88 m)	160 lb (73 kg)	May 7, 2024
Trystan Haynes; CB	Recruit ratings: Rivals: 247Sports: ESPN: (82)				
Omarion Robinson; S	Little Rock, AR	Parkview Magnet High School	5 ft 11 in (1.80 m)	185 lb (84 kg)	Jul 6, 2024
Omarion Robinson; S	Recruit ratings: Rivals: 247Sports: ESPN: (80)				
Trynae Washington; TE	Oklahoma City, OK	Carl Albert High School	6 ft 3 in (1.91 m)	205 lb (93 kg)	Nov 2, 2023
Trynae Washington; TE	Recruit ratings: Rivals: 247Sports: ESPN: (80)				
Tory Blaylock; RB	Houston, TX	Atascocita High School	5 ft 10.5 in (1.79 m)	195 lb (88 kg)	Mar 29, 2024
Tory Blaylock; RB	Recruit ratings: Rivals: 247Sports: ESPN: (82)				
Courtland Guillory; CB	Houston, TX	Klein Oak High School	6 ft 0 in (1.83 m)	170 lb (77 kg)	Apr 28, 2024
Courtland Guillory; CB	Recruit ratings: Rivals: 247Sports: ESPN: (79)				
Marcus Wimberly; S	Bauxite, AR	Bauxite High School	6 ft 0 in (1.83 m)	200 lb (91 kg)	Apr 6, 2024
Marcus Wimberly; S	Recruit ratings: Rivals: 247Sports: ESPN: (78)				
Darius Afalava; IOL	Lehi, UT	Skyridge High School	6 ft 4.5 in (1.94 m)	330 lb (150 kg)	Jun 28, 2024
Darius Afalava; IOL	Recruit ratings: Rivals: 247Sports: ESPN: (79)				
Marcus James; LB	Oklahoma City, OK	Carl Albert High School	6 ft 3.5 in (1.92 m)	210 lb (95 kg)	Nov 2, 2023
Marcus James; LB	Recruit ratings: Rivals: 247Sports: ESPN: (76)				
Maliek Hawkins; CB	Allen, TX	Frisco Emerson High School	6 ft 1 in (1.85 m)	175 lb (79 kg)	Apr 10, 2024
Maliek Hawkins; CB	Recruit ratings: Rivals: 247Sports: ESPN: (77)				
Alexander Shieldnight; EDGE	Wagoner, OK	Wagoner High School	6 ft 3 in (1.91 m)	220 lb (100 kg)	Nov 10, 2023
Alexander Shieldnight; EDGE	Recruit ratings: Rivals: 247Sports: ESPN: (78)				
Owen Hollenbeck; IOL	Melissa, TX	Melissa High School	6 ft 2.5 in (1.89 m)	340 lb (150 kg)	Dec 2, 2023
Owen Hollenbeck; IOL	Recruit ratings: Rivals: 247Sports: ESPN: (76)				
Jett Niu; QB	Lehi, UT	Lehi High School	6 ft 1.5 in (1.87 m)	170 lb (77 kg)	Dec 4, 2024
Jett Niu; QB	Recruit ratings: Rivals: 247Sports: ESPN: (74)				
Overall recruit ranking: Rivals: #17 247Sports: #17 ESPN: #19
Note: In many cases, Scout, Rivals, 247Sports, On3, and ESPN may conflict in their listings of height and weight.; In these cases, the average was taken. ESPN grades are on a 100-point scale.; Sources: "Rivals commits". Rivals.; "ESPN commits". ESPN.; "2025 Team Ranking". Rivals.com.; "247Sports commits". 247Sports.
