= Blalock =

Blalock may refer to:

- Blalock (surname)
- Blalock, Georgia, an unincorporated community
- Blalock, Oregon, a former community in the United States
- Lake Blalock, reservoir in Spartanburg County, South Carolina

== Houses ==
- Blalock House, historic home in Venice, Florida, United States
- Robert L. Blalock House, historic home in Lenoir County, North Carolina
- Dr. Nathan M. Blalock House, historic home near Raleigh, Wake County, North Carolina

== See also ==
- Blalock–Thomas–Taussig shunt, surgical procedure used to increase pulmonary blood flow
- Blalock–Hanlon procedure, a form of heart surgery
