= 2025 Illinois State Redbirds football team =

American college football season

2025 Illinois State Redbirds football

NCAA Division I Football Championship Game, L 34–35 ^{OT} vs. Montana State
- Conference: Missouri Valley Football Conference

Ranking
- STATS: No. 2
- FCS Coaches: No. 2
- Record: 12–5 (5–3 MVFC)
- Head coach: Brock Spack (17th season)
- Offensive coordinator: Tony Petersen (4th season)
- Offensive scheme: Spread
- Defensive coordinator: Travis Niekamp (8th season)
- Base defense: 3–3–5
- Captains: Dylan Calabrese; Tommy Rittenhouse; Tye Niekamp
- Home stadium: Hancock Stadium

2025 Missouri Valley Football Conference standings
	Conf.			Overall
Team	W		L	W		L
No. 4т North Dakota State $^	8	–	0	12	–	1
No. 9 South Dakota ^	6	–	2	10	–	5
No. 2 Illinois State ^	5	–	3	12	–	5
No. 14 North Dakota ^	5	–	3	8	–	6
No. 18 Youngstown State ^	5	–	3	8	–	5
No. 13 South Dakota State ^	4	–	4	9	–	5
No. 25 Southern Illinois	4	–	4	7	–	5
Northern Iowa	1	–	7	3	–	9
Murray State	1	–	7	1	–	11
Indiana State	1	–	7	3	–	9
$ – Conference champion; ^ – FCS playoff participant; Rankings from STATS Poll

The 2025 Illinois State Redbirds football team represented Illinois State University as a member of the Missouri Valley Football Conference (MVFC) during the 2025 NCAA Division I FCS football season. They were led by 17th-year head coach Brock Spack. The Redbirds played their home games at Hancock Stadium in Normal, Illinois.

Illinois State was an at-large selection into the playoff field and were unseeded; however, they defeated #17 (tie) ranked Southeastern Louisiana, #1 North Dakota State, #11 UC Davis and #9 Villanova, all away from home, to become the first FCS team to reach the championship game by defeating four consecutive road opponents. The Redbirds appeared in their second FCS National Championship Game (first since 2015); they faced #2 Montana State in the title game, falling 34–35 in overtime.

== Preseason ==
=== MVFC poll ===
The Missouri Valley Football Conference released its preseason poll on July 21, 2025, voted on by league athletic directors, coaches, and media members. The Redbirds were predicted to finish in fourth place within the ten-team conference.

== Schedule ==
Date	Time	Opponent	Rank	Site	TV	Result	Attendance
August 30	5:00 PM	at No. 18 (FBS) Oklahoma*	No. 6	Gaylord Family Oklahoma Memorial Stadium; Norman, OK	SECN+/ ESPN+	L 3–35	83,218
September 6	6:00 PM	Morehead State*	No. 7	Hancock Stadium; Normal, IL	ESPN+	W 41–13	9,671
September 13	2:00 PM	at Eastern Illinois*	No. 7	O'Brien Field; Charleston, IL (Mid-America Classic)	ESPN+	W 42–30	6,720
September 20	12:00 PM	North Alabama*	No. 6	Hancock Stadium; Normal, IL	ESPN+	W 38–36 ^{2OT}	11,287
October 4	6:00 PM	No. 1 North Dakota State	No. 6	Hancock Stadium; Normal, IL	ESPN+	L 16–33	9,829
October 11	6:00 PM	at Murray State	No. 9	Roy Stewart Stadium; Murray, KY	ESPN+	W 46–32	5,647
October 18	2:00 PM	Youngstown State^{†}	No. 10	Hancock Stadium; Normal, IL (Homecoming)	Marquee/ ESPN+	L 35–40	9,834
October 25	1:00 PM	at No. 21 South Dakota	No. 18	DakotaDome; Vermillion, SD	MidCo Sports/ ESPN+	W 21–13	6,333
November 1	2:00 PM	Northern Iowa	No. 17	Hancock Stadium; Normal, IL	Marquee/ ESPN+	W 31–16	7,756
November 8	12:00 PM	at Indiana State	No. 16	Memorial Stadium; Terre Haute, IN	ESPN+	W 52–20	3,522
November 15	2:00 PM	at No. 16 South Dakota State	No. 14	Dana J. Dykhouse Stadium; Brookings, SD	MidCo Sports/ ESPN+	W 35–21	11,407
November 22	12:00 PM	No. 24 Southern Illinois	No. 11	Hancock Stadium; Normal, IL (Senior Day)	Marquee/ ESPN+	L 7–37	6,895
November 29	12:00 PM	at No. 17т (16) Southeastern Louisiana*	No. 17т	Strawberry Stadium; Hammond, LA (NCAA Division I First Round)	ESPN+	W 21–3	6,117
December 6	12:00 PM	at No. 1 (1) North Dakota State*	No. 17т	Fargodome; Fargo, ND (NCAA Division I Second Round)	ESPN+	W 29–28	10,464
December 13	4:00 PM	at No. 11 (8) UC Davis*	No. 17т	UC Davis Health Stadium; Davis, CA (NCAA Division I Quarterfinal)	ESPN+	W 42–31	9,216
December 20	6:30 PM	at No. 9 (12) Villanova*	No. 17т	Villanova Stadium; Villanova, PA (NCAA Division I Semifinal)	ESPN2	W 30–14	4,133
January 5, 2026	6:30 PM	vs. No. 2 (2) Montana State*	No. 17т	FirstBank Stadium; Nashville, TN (NCAA Division I Championship)	ESPN	L 34–35 ^{OT}	24,105
*Non-conference game; ^{†}Homecoming; Rankings from STATS Poll released prior to the game; All times are in Central time

== Game summaries ==
All times are Central time

=== Regular season ===
==== at No. 18 (FBS) Oklahoma ====
No. 6 Illinois State Redbirds (0–0) at No. 18 (FBS) Oklahoma Sooners (0–0) – Game summary

Quarter	1	2	3	4	Total
No. 6 Redbirds	0	0	3	0	3
No. 18 (FBS) Sooners	7	14	0	14	35

at Gaylord Family Oklahoma Memorial Stadium • Norman, OK

- Date: August 30
- Game time: 5:00 PM CDT
- Game weather: Cloudy • Temperature: 79 °F (26 °C) • Wind: E at 6 miles per hour (9.7 km/h)
- Game attendance: 83,218
- Referee: Marc Curles
- TV announcers (SECN+/ESPN+): Richard Cross (play-by-play), Tyoka Jackson (analyst), Madison Hock (sideline)
- Box score

Game information
First quarter
- OU – John Mateer 7-yard run (Tate Sandell kick), 0:39. Sooners 7–0. Drive: 10 plays, 94 yards, 5:04.

Second quarter

- OU – Deion Burks 27-yard pass from John Mateer (Tate Sandell kick), 11:50. Sooners 14–0. Drive: 4 plays, 77 yards, 1:08.
- OU - Tory Blaylock 5-yard run (Tate Sandell kick), 0:51. Sooners 21–0. Drive: 15 plays, 81 yards, 7:27.

Third quarter

- ILS – Matt Maldonado 33-yard field goal, 6:26. Sooners 21–3. Drive: 4 plays, 7 yards, 1:58.

Fourth quarter

- OU – Keontez Lewis 28-yard pass from John Mateer (Tate Sandell kick), 14:52. Sooners 28–3. Drive: 12 plays, 77 yards, 6:34.
- OU – Keontez Lewis 20-yard pass from John Mateer (Tate Sandell kick). 4:33. Sooners 35–3. Drive: 8 plays, 75 yards, 4:02.

Statistics	ILS	OU
First downs	8	24
Plays–yards	46–151	69–495
Rushes–yards	26–117	32–103
Passing yards	34	392
Passing: Comp–Att–Int	10–20–0	30–37–1
Turnovers	0	2
Time of possession	27:04	32:56

Team	Category	Player	Statistics
Illinois State	Passing	Tommy Rittenhouse	6/13, 22 yards
Illinois State	Rushing	Wenkers Wright	7 carries, 50 yards
Illinois State	Receiving	Eddie Kasper	1 reception, 10 yards
Oklahoma	Passing	John Mateer	30/37, 392 yards, 3 TD, INT
Oklahoma	Rushing	Tory Blaylock	8 carries, 42 yards, TD
Oklahoma	Receiving	Keontez Lewis	9 receptions, 119 yards, 2 TD

==== Morehead State ====
Morehead State Eagles (1–0) at No. 7 Illinois State Redbirds (0–1) – Game summary

Quarter	1	2	3	4	Total
Eagles	6	0	0	7	13
No. 7 Redbirds	3	14	10	14	41

at Hancock Stadium • Normal, IL

- Date: September 6
- Game time: 6:00 PM
- Game weather: Sunny • Temperature: 68 °F (20 °C) • Wind: NW at 11 miles per hour (18 km/h)
- Game attendance: 9,671
- Referee: Carl Chapman
- TV announcers (ESPN+): Kurt Pegler (play-by-play), Clay Harbor (analyst), Genna Rose (sideline)
- Box score

Game information
First quarter
- MSU – Craig Cunningham 1-yard run (), 7:02. Eagles 6–0. Drive: 14 plays, 86 yards, 7:53.
- ILS – Matt Maldonado 27-yard field goal, 1:58. Eagles 6–3. Drive: 11 plays, 33 yards, 3:25.

Second quarter

- ILS – Daniel Sobkowicz 25-yard pass from Beckham Pellant (Maldonado kick), 11:53. Redbirds 10–6. Drive: 7 plays, 75 yards, 02:52.
- ILS – Tommy Rittenhouse 1-yard run (Maldonado kick), 6:47. Redbirds 17–6. Drive: 3 plays, 80 yards, 1:03.

Third quarter

- ILS – Maldonado 45-yard field goal, 8:20. Redbirds 20–6. Drive: 6 plays, 14 yards, 2:12.
- ILS – Luke Mailander 32-yard pass from Rittenhouse (Maldonado kick), 6:29. Redbirds 27–6. Drive: 3 plays, 29 yards, 1:11.

Fourth quarter

- MSU – Montez Green 14-yard pass from Carter Cravens (Jordan Price kick), 13:28. Redbirds 27–13. Drive: 13 plays, 84 yards, 7:54.
- ILS – Nick True 3-yard pass from Rittenhouse (Maldonado kick), 4:28. Redbirds 34–13. Drive: 8 plays, 71 yards, 3:57.
- ILS – Cam Wilson 27-yard fumble recovery (Maldonado kick), 4:05. Redbirds 41–13.

Statistics	MSU	ILS
First downs	20	21
Total yards	234	393
Rushing yards	100	223
Passing yards	134	170
Passing: Comp–Att–Int	14–28–1	13–23–1
Time of possession	35:26	24:34

Team	Category	Player	Statistics
Morehead State	Passing	Carter Cravens	14/28, 134 yards, 1 TD, 1 INT
Morehead State	Rushing	Isaac Stopke	13 carries, 86 yards
Morehead State	Receiving	Ryan Upp	7 receptions, 69 yards
Illinois State	Passing	Tommy Rittenhouse	8/13, 81 yards, 2 TD, INT
Illinois State	Rushing	Victor Dawson	10 carries, 88 yards
Illinois State	Receiving	Daniel Sobkowicz	5 receptions, 87 yards, TD

==== at Eastern Illinois (Mid-America Classic) ====
No. 7 Illinois State Redbirds (1–1) at Eastern Illinois Panthers (1–1) – Game summary

Quarter	1	2	3	4	Total
No. 7 Redbirds	7	14	7	14	42
Panthers	0	10	0	20	30

at O'Brien Field • Charleston, IL

- Date: September 13
- Game time: 12:00 PM
- Game weather: Sunny • Temperature: 91 °F (33 °C) • Wind: S at 12 miles per hour (19 km/h)
- Game attendance: 6,720
- Referee: Drew Myers
- TV announcers (ESPN+): Mike Bradd (play-by-play), Dave Kidwell (analyst), Kaylee Unruh (sideline)
- Box score

Game information
First quarter
- ILS – Wenkers Wright 2-yard run (Matt Maldonado kick), 7:13. Redbirds 7–0. Drive: 8 plays, 59 yards, 3:26.

Second quarter

- ILS – Daniel Sobkowicz 10-yard pass from Tommy Rittenhouse (Maldonado kick), 13:49. Redbirds 14–0. Drive: 11 plays, 51 yards, 3:58.
- EIU – C J Nelson 75-yard pass from Connor Wolf (Drew Schiller kick), 13:30. Redbirds 14–7. Drive: 1 plays, 75 yards, 0:13.
- EIU – Schiller 43-yard field goal, 0:42. Redbirds 14–10. Drive: 7 plays, 17 yards, 2:40.
- ILS – Luke Mailander 46-yard pass from Rittenhouse (Maldonado kick), 0:08. Redbirds 21–10. Drive: 4 plays, 65 yards, 0:34.

Third quarter

- ILS – Wright 18-yard run (Maldonado kick), 7:21. Redbirds 28–10. Drive: 4 plays, 65 yards, 1:37.

Fourth quarter

- EIU – Cooper Willman 18-yard pass from Wolf (Schiller kick), 11:43. Redbirds 28–17. Drive: 7 plays, 92 yards, 2:58.
- EIU – Nelson 51-yard pass from Wolf (), 8:30. Redbirds 28–23. Drive: 3 plays, 74 yards, 1:20.
- ILS – Wright 16-yard run (Maldonado kick), 6:21. Redbirds 35–23. Drive: 5 plays, 64 yards, 2:00.
- ILS – Sobkowicz 22-yard pass from Rittenhouse (Maldonado kick), 3:14. Redbirds 42–23. Drive: 5 plays, 35 yards, 2:32.
- EIU – DeAirious Smith 9-yard pass from Wolf (Schiller kick), 1:47. Redbirds 42–30. Drive: 8 plays, 75 yards, 1:27.

Statistics	ILS	EIU
First downs	24	20
Total yards	485	446
Rushing yards	186	35
Passing yards	299	411
Passing: Comp–Att–Int	24–35–0	28–44–2
Time of possession	30:30	29:30

Team	Category	Player	Statistics
Illinois State	Passing	Tommy Rittenhouse	24/35, 299 yards, 3 TD
Illinois State	Rushing	Wenkers Wright	14 carries, 94 yards, 3 TD
Illinois State	Receiving	Luke Mailander	5 receptions, 109 yards, 1 TD
Eastern Illinois	Passing	Connor Wolf	28/43, 411 yards, 4 TD, 2 INT
Eastern Illinois	Rushing	Charles Kellom	15 carries, 22 yards
Eastern Illinois	Receiving	C J Nelson	7 receptions, 194 yards, 2 TD

==== North Alabama ====
North Alabama Lions (1–2) at No. 6 Illinois State Redbirds (2–1) – Game summary

Quarter	1	2	3	4	OT	2OT	Total
Lions	0	7	7	13	3	6	36
No. 6 Redbirds	3	14	7	3	3	8	38

at Hancock Stadium • Normal, IL

- Date: September 20
- Game time: 12:00 PM
- Game weather: Cloudy • Temperature: 79 °F (26 °C) • Wind: S at 9 miles per hour (14 km/h)
- Game attendance: 11,287
- Referee: John Shay
- TV announcers (ESPN+): Kurt Pegler (play-by-play), Clay Harbor (analyst), Kalia Butler (sideline)
- Box score

Game information
First quarter
- ILS – Matt Maldonado 42-yard field goal, 5:18. Redbirds 3–0. Drive: 6 plays, 32 yards, 1:50..

Second quarter

- ILS – Wenkers Wright 38-yard run (Maldonado kick), 14:21. Redbirds 10–0. Drive: 6 plays, 80 yards, 2:00.
- ILS – Luke Mailander 10-yard pass from Tommy Rittenhouse (Maldonado kick), 9:42. Redbirds 17–0. Drive: 5 plays, 68 yards, 2:05.
- UNA – Noah Gregg 10-yard pass from Ari Patu (Ian Vachon kick), 0:09. Redbirds 17–7. Drive: 6 plays, 45 yards, 0:22.

Third quarter

- UNA – Jayvian Allen 1-yard run (Vachon kick), 9:24. Redbirds 17–14. Drive: 9 plays, 61 yards, 4:08.
- ILS – Daniel Sobkowicz 6-yard pass from Rittenhouse (Maldonado kick), 1:54. Redbirds 24–14. Drive: 8 plays, 46 yards, 2:52.

Fourth quarter

- UNA – Justin Pegues 39-yard pass from Patu (Vachon kick), 5:54. Redbirds 24–21. Drive: 13 plays, 90 yards, 5:26.
- ILS – Maldonado 51-yard field goal, 2:36. Redbirds 27–21. Drive: 6 plays, 41 yards, 3:06.
- UNA – K J Fields 25-yard pass from Patu (), 0:33. Tied 27–27. Drive: 9 plays, 75 yards, 2:03.

Overtime

- UNA – Vachon 42-yard field goal. Lions 30–27. Drive: 4 plays, 1 yards.
- ILS – Maldonado 38-yard field goal. Tied 30–30. Drive: 4 plays, 4 yards.

Second overtime

- ILS – Sobkowicz 25-yard pass from Rittenhouse (Sobkowicz pass from Rittenhouse). Redbirds 38–30. Drive: 1 play, 25 yards.
- UNA – Pegues 18-yard pass from Patu (). Redbirds 38–36. Drive: 4 plays, 25 yards.

Statistics	UNA	ILS
First downs	24	29
Total yards	409	506
Rushing yards	144	217
Passing yards	265	289
Passing: Comp–Att–Int	22–37–1	21–37–0
Time of possession	30:30	29:30

Team	Category	Player	Statistics
North Alabama	Passing	Ari Patu	17/31, 243 yards, 4 TD, 1 INT
North Alabama	Rushing	Ari Patu	14 carries, 60 yards
North Alabama	Receiving	K J Fields	7 receptions, 94 yards, 1 TD
Illinois State	Passing	Tommy Rittenhouse	20/36, 250 yards, 3 TD
Illinois State	Rushing	Tommy Rittenhouse	9 carries, 89 yards
Illinois State	Receiving	Daniel Sobkowicz	10 receptions, 150 yards, 2 TD

==== No. 1 North Dakota State ====
No. 1 North Dakota State Bison (4–0) at No. 6 Illinois State Redbirds (3–1) – Game summary

Quarter	1	2	3	4	Total
No. 1 Bison	7	8	3	15	33
No. 6 Redbirds	2	7	7	0	16

at Hancock Stadium • Normal, IL

- Date: October 4
- Game time: 6:00 PM
- Game weather: Sunny • Temperature: 82 °F (28 °C) • Wind: N at 10 miles per hour (16 km/h)
- Game attendance: 9,829
- Referee: Jason Berg
- TV announcers (ESPN+): Greg Halbleib (play-by-play), Clay Harbor (analyst)
- Box score

Game information
First quarter
- ILS – Tye Niekamp 0-yard safety, 9:35. Redbirds 2–0.
- NDS – Cole Payton 13-yard run (Eli Ozick kick), 2:50. Bison 7–2. Drive: 7 plays, 47 yards, 3:53.

Second quarter

- ILS – Wenkers Wright 6-yard run (Matt Maldonado kick), 11:37. Redbirds 9–7. Drive: 10 plays, 65 yards, 6:13.
- NDS – Barika Kpeenu 42-yard run (Payton rush), 4:56. Bison 15–9. Drive: 3 plays, 68 yards, 1:25.

Third quarter

- NDS – Ozick 38-yard field goal, 8:15. Bison 18–9. Drive: 11 plays, 65 yards, 6:38.
- ILS – Daniel Sobkowicz 3-yard pass from Tommy Rittenhouse (Maldonado kick), 3:06. Bison 18–16. Drive: 9 plays, 75 yards, 5:09.

Fourth quarter

- NDS – Bryce Lance 23-yard pass from Payton, (Ozick kick), 13:14. Bison 25–16. Drive: 8 plays, 70 yards, 4:45.
- NDS – D J Scott 5-yard run, (Payton rush), 8:21. Bison 33–16. Drive: 6 plays, 73 yards, 3:51.

Statistics	NDS	ILS
First downs	21	22
Total yards	407	328
Rushing yards	213	137
Passing yards	194	191
Passing: Comp–Att–Int	12–14–0	20–35–1
Time of possession	29:38	30:22

Team	Category	Player	Statistics
North Dakota State	Passing	Cole Payton	12/14, 194 yards, 1 TD
North Dakota State	Rushing	Barika Kpeenu	14 carries, 116 yards, 1 TD
North Dakota State	Receiving	Jackson Williams	3 receptions, 71 yards
Illinois State	Passing	Tommy Rittenhouse	20/35, 191 Yards, 1 TD, 1 INT
Illinois State	Rushing	Victor Dawson	11 carries, 68 yards
Illinois State	Receiving	Daniel Sobkowicz	7 receptions, 75 yards, 1 TD

==== at Murray State ====
No. 9 Illinois State Redbirds (3–2) at Murray State Racers (0–5) – Game summary

Quarter	1	2	3	4	Total
No. 9 Redbirds	21	10	12	3	46
Racers	3	14	7	8	32

at Roy Stewart Stadium • Murray, KY

- Date: October 11
- Game time: 6:00 PM
- Game weather: Sunny • Temperature: 78 °F (26 °C) • Wind: NE at 6 miles per hour (9.7 km/h)
- Game attendance: 5,647
- Referee: Gregory Gompf
- TV announcers (ESPN+): Casey Roehl (play-by-play), Drayton Charlton-Perrin (analyst)
- Box score

Game information
First quarter
- ILS – Daniel Sobkowicz 2-yard run (Matt Maldonado kick), 10:16. Redbirds 7–0. Drive: 9 plays, 61 yards, 3:45.
- ILS – Dylan Lord 4-yard pass from Tommy Rittenhouse (Maldonado kick), 3:44. Redbirds 14–0. Drive: 7 plays, 85 yards, 3:10.
- MUR – Jack Tannehill 41-yard field goal, 0:45. Redbirds 14–3. Drive: 8 plays, 56 yards, 2:52.
- ILS – Victor Dawson 12-yard run (Maldonado kick), 0:27. Redbirds 21–3. Drive: 1 plays, 12 yards, 0:06

Second quarter

- ILS – Seth Glatz 52-yard pass from Rittenhouse (Maldonado kick), 12:06. Redbirds 28–3. Drive: 2 plays, 51 yards, 0:40.
- MUR – Jordan Washington 6-yard run (Tannehill kick), 5:37. Redbirds 28–10. Drive: 15 plays, 77 yards, 6:24.
- MUR – Jim Ogle 1-yard run (Tannehill kick), 0:34. Redbirds 28–17. Drive: 13 plays, 80 yards, 2:57.
- ILS – Maldonado 37-yard field goal, 0:00. Redbirds 31–17. Drive: 4 plays, 55 yards, 0:34.

Third quarter

- ILS – Javon Charles 19-yard pass from Rittenhouse (), 11:46. Redbirds 37–17. Drive: 8 plays, 75 yards, 3:14.
- MUR – Ogle 4-yard run (Tannehill kick), 8:09. Redbirds 37–24. Drive: 9 plays, 81 yards, 3:32.
- ILS – Sobkowicz 24-yard pass from Rittenhouse (), 3:23. Redbirds 43–24. Drive: 8 plays, 79 yards, 4:40.

Fourth quarter

- MUR – Jawaun Northington 5-yard pass from Ogle (Darius Cannon pass from Ogle), 14:55. Redbirds 43–32. Drive: 7 plays, 83 yards, 3:16.
- ILS – Maldonado 26-yard field goal, 3:25. Redbirds 46–32. Drive: 19 plays, 88 yards, 9:57.

Statistics	ILS	MUR
First downs	31	26
Total yards	510	471
Rushing yards	172	170
Passing yards	338	301
Passing: Comp–Att–Int	21–25–0	24–40–1
Time of possession	30:57	29:03

Team	Category	Player	Statistics
Illinois State	Passing	Tommy Rittenhouse	21/25, 338 yards, 4 TD
Illinois State	Rushing	Victor Dawson	10 carries, 71 yards, 1 TD
Illinois State	Receiving	Daniel Sobkowicz	8 receptions, 162 yards, 1 TD
Murray State	Passing	Jim Ogle	23/39, 283 yards, 1 TD, 1 INT
Murray State	Rushing	Jawaun Northington	15 carries, 71 yards
Murray State	Receiving	Lucas Desjardins	8 receptions, 95 yards

==== Youngstown State (Homecoming) ====
Youngstown State Penguins (3–3) at No. 10 Illinois State Redbirds (4–2) – Game summary

Quarter	1	2	3	4	Total
Penguins	6	6	7	21	40
No. 10 Redbirds	0	14	14	7	35

at Hancock Stadium • Normal, IL

- Date: October 18
- Game time: 2:00 PM
- Game weather: Cloudy • Temperature: 75 °F (24 °C) • Wind: SW at 15 miles per hour (24 km/h)
- Game attendance: 9,834
- Referee: David Hergert
- TV announcers (Marquee/ESPN+): Kurt Pegler (play-by-play), Clay Harbor (analyst), Kacy Standohar (sideline)
- Box score

Game information
First quarter
- YSU – Andrew Lastovka 32-yard field goal, 9:37. Penguins 3–0. Drive: 11 plays, 61 yards, 5:16.
- YSU – Lastovka 23-yard field goal, 4:40. Penguins 6–0. Drive: 9 plays, 30 yards, 4:16.

Second quarter

- YSU – Beau Brungard 2-yard run (), 8:49. Penguins 12–0. Drive: 13 plays, 92 yards, 7:27.
- ILS – Javon Charles 13-yard pass from Tommy Rittenhouse (Matt Maldonado kick), 6:45. Penguins 12–7. Drive: 6 plays, 75 yards, 2:04.
- ILS – Wenkers Wright 12-yard pass from Rittenhouse (Maldonado kick), 0:31. Redbirds 14–12. Drive: 3 plays, 39 yards, 0:18.

Third quarter

- ILS – Eddie Kasper 37-yard pass from Rittenhouse (Maldonado kick), 14:43. Redbirds 21–12. Drive: 1 play, 37 yards, 0:08.
- YSU – Mike Solomon 36-yard pass from Brungard (Lastovka kick), 10:41. Redbirds 21–19. Drive: 8 plays, 75 yards, 4:02.
- ILS – Luke Mailander 18-yard pass from Rittenhouse (Maldonado kick), 2:43. Redbirds 28–19. Drive: 4 plays, 44 yards, 1:35.

Fourth quarter

- YSU – Brungard 1-yard run (Lastovka kick), 11:52. Redbirds 28–26. Drive: 11 plays, 81 yards, 5:45.
- YSU – Fresh Walter 53-yard pass from Brungard (Lastovka kick), 8:06. Penguins 33–28. Drive: 5 plays, 79 yards, 1:56.
- YSU – Brungard 48-yard run (Lastovka kick), 5:51. Penguins 40–28. Drive: 2 plays, 52 yards, 0:53.
- ILS – Wright 3-yard pass from Rittenhouse (Maldonado kick), 3:12. Penguins 40–35. Drive: 11 plays, 75 yards, 2:39.

Statistics	YSU	ILS
First downs	27	23
Total yards	561	348
Rushing yards	233	142
Passing yards	328	206
Passing: Comp–Att–Int	23–34–1	16–30–2
Time of possession	39:15	20:45

Team	Category	Player	Statistics
Youngstown State	Passing	Beau Brungard	23/34, 328 yards, 2 TD, 1 INT
Youngstown State	Rushing	Beau Brungard	30 carries, 200 yards, 3 TD
Youngstown State	Receiving	Ethan Wright	4 receptions, 86 yards
Illinois State	Passing	Tommy Rittenhouse	16/29, 206 yards, 5 TD, 2 INT
Illinois State	Rushing	Tommy Rittenhouse	10 carries, 65 yards
Illinois State	Receiving	Luke Mailander	4 receptions, 51 yards, 1 TD

==== at No. 21 South Dakota ====
No. 18 Illinois State Redbirds (4–3) at No. 21 South Dakota Coyotes (5–3) – Game summary

Quarter	1	2	3	4	Total
No. 18 Redbirds	0	14	7	0	21
No. 21 Coyotes	3	7	0	3	13

at DakotaDome • Vermillion, SD

- Date: October 25
- Game time: 1:00 PM
- Game weather: Indoors • Temperature: 72 °F (22 °C)
- Game attendance: 6,333
- Referee: Jason Perkins
- TV announcers (MidCo Sports/ESPN+): Jay Eisen (play-by-play), Andre Fields (analyst)
- Box score

Game information
First quarter
- USD – Will Leyland 37-yard field goal, 8:47. Coyotes 3–0. Drive: 13 plays, 66 yards, 6:02

Second quarter

- ILS – Scotty Presson Jr 11-yard pass from Tommy Rittenhouse (Matt Maldonado kick), 10:45. Redbirds 7–3. Drive: 12 plays, 79 yards, 4:42
- USD – Jesse Miller 11-yard pass from Aidan Bouman (Leyland kick), 2:23. Coyotes 10–7. Drive: 14 plays, 80 yards, 8:16
- ILS – Rittenhouse 6-yard run (Maldonado kick), 0:30. Redbirds 14–10. Drive: 12 plays, 75 yards, 1:53

Third quarter

- ILS – Presson Jr 2-yard pass from Rittenhouse (Maldonado kick), 1:22. Redbirds 21–10. Drive: 12 plays, 75 yards, 5:15.

Fourth quarter

- USD – Leyland 42-yard field goal, 3:38. Redbirds 21–13. Drive: 12 plays, 57 yards, 6:08.

Statistics	ILS	USD
First downs	18	22
Total yards	300	369
Rushing yards	130	196
Passing yards	170	173
Passing: Comp–Att–Int	19–28–0	21–39–0
Time of possession	23:19	36:41

Team	Category	Player	Statistics
Illinois State	Passing	Tommy Rittenhouse	18/27, 141 yards, 2 TD
Illinois State	Rushing	Seth Glatz	5 carries, 35 yards
Illinois State	Receiving	Dylan Lord	8 receptions, 82 yards
South Dakota	Passing	Aidan Bouman	21/38, 173 yards, 1 TD
South Dakota	Rushing	L. J. Phillips Jr.	26 carries, 129 yards
South Dakota	Receiving	Larenzo Fenner	4 receptions, 65 yards

==== Northern Iowa ====
Northern Iowa Panthers (2–6) at No. 17 Illinois State Redbirds (5–3) – Game summary

Quarter	1	2	3	4	Total
Panthers	0	3	7	6	16
No. 17 Redbirds	14	7	7	3	31

at Hancock Stadium • Normal, IL

- Date: November 1
- Game time: 2:00 PM
- Game weather: Sunny • Temperature: 50 °F (10 °C) • Wind: W at 8 miles per hour (13 km/h)
- Game attendance: 7,756
- Referee: Tyler Downs
- TV announcers (Marquee/ESPN+): Kurt Pegler (play-by-play), Zack Annexstad (analyst), Kalia Butler (sideline)
- Box score

Game information
First quarter
- ILS – Tommy Rittenhouse 4-yard run (Matt Maldonado kick), 4:59. Redbirds 7–0. Drive: 13 plays, 80 yards, 4:50.
- ILS – Seth Glatz 2-yard run (Maldonado kick), 1:31. Redbirds 14–0. Drive: 4 plays, 61 yards, 1:20.

Second quarter

- ILS – Javon Charles 19-yard pass from Rittenhouse (Maldonado kick), 7:20. Redbirds 21–0. Drive: 4 plays, 35 yards, 1:30.
- UNI – Max Bartachek 28-yard field goal, 0:24. Redbirds 21–3. 15 plays, 65 yards, 6:56.

Third quarter

- UNI – Harrison Bey–Buie 2-yard run (Bartachek kick), 9:11. Redbirds 21–10. Drive: 7 plays, 58 yards, 3:20.
- ILS – Victor Dawson 9-yard run (Maldonado kick), 4:30. Redbirds 28–10. Drive: 12 plays, 75 yards, 4:41.

Fourth quarter

- UNI – J C Roque Jr 41-yard pass from Jaxon Dailey (), 14:47. Redbirds 28–16. Drive: 8 plays, 87 yards, 4:37.
- ILS – Maldonado 32-yard field goal, 1:53. Redbirds 31–16. Drive: 14 plays, 44 yards, 6:49.

Statistics	UNI	ILS
First downs	16	25
Total yards	240	430
Rushing yards	98	202
Passing yards	142	228
Passing: Comp–Att–Int	15–23–2	28–37–0
Time of possession	28:32	31:28

Team	Category	Player	Statistics
Northern Iowa	Passing	Jaxon Dailey	15/23, 142 yards, 1 TD, 2 INT
Northern Iowa	Rushing	Jaxon Dailey	16 carries, 40 yards
Northern Iowa	Receiving	J C Roque Jr	5 receptions, 53 yards, 1 TD
Illinois State	Passing	Tommy Rittenhouse	28/37, 228 yards, 1 TD
Illinois State	Rushing	Victor Dawson	17 carries, 101 yards, 1 TD
Illinois State	Receiving	Luke Mailander	4 receptions, 72 yards

==== at Indiana State ====
No. 16 Illinois State Redbirds (6–3) at Indiana State Sycamores (3–6) – Game summary

Quarter	1	2	3	4	Total
No. 16 Redbirds	7	28	17	0	52
Sycamores	7	7	6	0	20

at Memorial Stadium • Terre Haute, IN

- Date: November 8
- Game time: 12:00 PM CST
- Game weather: Sunny • Temperature: 56 °F (13 °C) • Wind: NW at 5 miles per hour (8.0 km/h)
- Game attendance: 3,202
- Referee: Carl Chapman
- TV announcers (ESPN+): Joey O'Rourke (play-by-play), Jim Leisure (analyst), Piper Watkins (sideline)
- Box score

Game information
First quarter
- ILS – Max Ziebarth 2-yard pass from Tommy Rittenhouse (Matt Maldonado kick), 6:13. Redbirds 7–0. Drive: 10 plays, 70 yards, 4:47.
- INS – Talan White 25-yard pass from Keegan Patterson (Sebastian Lopez kick), 2:01. Tied 7–7. Drive: 5 plays, 57 yards, 1:41.

Second quarter

- ILS – Victor Dawson 6-yard run (Maldonado kick), 13:55. Redbirds 14–7. Drive: 7 plays, 65 yards, 3:06.
- INS – Rashad Rochelle 64-yard pass from Patterson (Lopez kick), 10:52. Tied 14–14. Drive: 7 plays, 75 yards, 3:03.
- ILS – Dylan Lord 3-yard pass from Rittenhouse (Maldonado kick), 6:57. Redbirds 21–14. Drive: 9 plays, 52 yards, 3:54.
- ILS – Seth Glatz 20-yard pass from Rittenhouse (Maldonado kick), 1:39. Redbirds 28–14. Drive: 10 plays, 72 yards, 3:54.
- ILS – Rittenhouse 4-yard run (Maldonado kick), 0:22. Redbirds 35–14. Drive: 4 plays, 48 yards, 0:31.

Third quarter

- ILS – Daniel Sobkowicz 12-yard pass from Rittenhouse (Maldonado kick), 10:18. Redbirds 42–14. Drive: 7 plays, 66 yards, 2:56.
- ILS – Glatz 2-yard run (Maldonado kick), 7:28. Redbirds 49–14. Drive: 6 plays, 37 yards, 2:39.
- INS – Deion Brown 33-yard run (), 5:20. Redbirds 49–20. Drive: 6 plays, 75 yards, 2:08.
- ILS – Maldonado 49-yard field goal, 1:01. Redbirds 52–20. Drive: 9 plays, 48 yards, 4:14.

Statistics	ILS	INS
First downs	33	12
Total yards	555	272
Rushing yards	241	68
Passing yards	314	204
Passing: Comp–Att–Int	29–34–0	17–28–2
Time of possession	40:42	19:18

Team	Category	Player	Statistics
Illinois State	Passing	Tommy Rittenhouse	29/34, 314 yards, 4 TD
Illinois State	Rushing	Victor Dawson	21 carries, 116 yards, 1 TD
Illinois State	Receiving	Dylan Lord	8 receptions, 87 yards, 1 TD
Indiana State	Passing	Keegan Patterson	16/26, 202 yards, 2 TD, 2 INT
Indiana State	Rushing	Deion Brown	7 carries, 39 yards, 1 TD
Indiana State	Receiving	Rashad Rochelle	6 receptions, 103 yards, 1 TD

==== at No. 16 South Dakota State ====
No. 14 Illinois State Redbirds (7–3) at No. 16 South Dakota State Jackrabbits (7–3) – Game summary

Quarter	1	2	3	4	Total
No. 14 Redbirds	28	7	0	0	35
No. 16 Jackrabbits	0	13	0	8	21

at Dana J. Dykhouse Stadium • Brookings, SD

- Date: November 15
- Game time: 2:00 PM
- Game weather: Sunny • Temperature: 52 °F (11 °C) • Wind: N at 10 miles per hour (16 km/h)
- Game attendance: 11,407
- Referee: Grant Henderson
- TV announcers (MidCo Sports/ESPN+): Tyler Merriam (play-by-play), Mason Lieseth (analyst)
- Box score

Game information
First quarter
- ILS – Daniel Sobkowicz 10-yard pass from Tommy Rittenhouse (Matt Maldonado kick), 13:05. Redbirds 7–0. Drive: 8 plays, 62 yards, 1:46.
- ILS – Patrick Bauer 5-yard interception return (Maldonado kick), 12:03. Redbirds 14–0.
- ILS – Sobkowicz 2-yard pass from Rittenhouse (Maldonado kick), 10:29. Redbirds 21–0. Drive: 5 plays, 28 yards, 1:33.
- ILS – Rittenhouse 2-yard run (Maldonado kick), 6:26. Redbirds 28–0. Drive: 7 plays, 25 yards, 2:37.

Second quarter

- ILS – Sobkowicz 9-yard pass from Rittenhouse (Maldonado kick), 10:15. Redbirds 35–0. Drive: 9 plays, 63 yards, 3:49.
- SDS – Jack Henry 14-yard run (Eli Stader kick), 5:03. Redbirds 35–7. Drive: 10 plays, 75 yards, 5:12.
- SDS – Brayden Delahoyde 4-yard pass from Henry (), 0:25. Redbirds 35–13. Drive: 15 plays, 96 yards, 2:00.

Fourth quarter

- SDS – Josiah Johnson 2-yard run (Greyton Gannon pass from Henry), 14:37. Redbirds 35–21. Drive: 16 plays, 80 yards, 6:01.

Statistics	ILS	SDS
First downs	20	22
Total yards	275	320
Rushing yards	134	66
Passing yards	141	254
Passing: Comp–Att–Int	17–33–0	32–51–2
Time of possession	28:56	31:04

Team	Category	Player	Statistics
Illinois State	Passing	Tommy Rittenhouse	17/32, 141 yards, 3 TD
Illinois State	Rushing	Victor Dawson	20 carries, 98 yards
Illinois State	Receiving	Daniel Sobkowicz	5 receptions, 55 yards, 3 TD
South Dakota State	Passing	Jack Henry	32/51, 254 yards, 1 TD, 2 INT
South Dakota State	Rushing	Jack Henry	18 carries, 41 yards, 1 TD
South Dakota State	Receiving	Alex Bullock	9 receptions, 68 yards

==== No. 24 Southern Illinois (Senior Day) ====
No. 24 Southern Illinois Salukis (6–5) at No. 11 Illinois State Redbirds (8–3) – Game summary

Quarter	1	2	3	4	Total
No. 24 Salukis	7	10	3	17	37
No. 11 Redbirds	7	0	0	0	7

at Hancock Stadium • Normal, IL

- Date: November 22
- Game time: 12:00 PM
- Game weather: Sunny • Temperature: 50 °F (10 °C) • Wind: SW at 10 miles per hour (16 km/h)
- Game attendance: 6,895
- Referee: John Shay
- TV announcers (Marquee/ESPN+): Kurt Pegler (play-by-play), Zack Annexstad (analyst), Kacy Standohar (sideline)
- Box score

Game information
First quarter
- SIU – D J Williams 12-yard run (Paul Geelen kick), 8:42. Salukis 7–0. Drive: 13 plays, 85 yards, 6:11
- ILS – Tommy Rittenhouse 1-yard run (Matt Maldonado kick), 4:43. Tied 7–7. Drive: 9 plays, 75 yards, 3:59.

Second quarter

- SIU – Williams 1-yard run (Geelen kick), 14:56. Salukis 14–7. Drive: 11 plays, 49 yards, 3:49
- SIU – Geelen 32-yard field goal, 0:29. Salukis 17–7. 10 plays, 63 yards, 4:23.

Third quarter

- SIU – Geelen 36-yard field goal, 5:07. Salukis 20–7. 8 plays, 43 yards, 3:44.

Fourth quarter

- SIU – Williams 3-yard run (Geelen kick), 12:08. Salukis 27–7. Drive: 12 plays, 90 yards, 6:53
- SIU – Geelen 48-yard field goal, 6:25. Salukis 30–7. 4 plays, 6 yards, 1:43.
- SIU – Williams 42-yard run (Geelen kick), 4:22. Salukis 37–7. Drive: 2 plays, 42 yards, 0:14

Statistics	SIU	ILS
First downs	22	12
Total yards	455	217
Rushing yards	296	73
Passing yards	159	144
Passing: Comp–Att–Int	18–31–0	15–27–2
Time of possession	36:53	23:07

Team	Category	Player	Statistics
Southern Illinois	Passing	D J Williams	18/30, 159 yards
Southern Illinois	Rushing	Eddie Robinson	19 carries, 145 yards
Southern Illinois	Receiving	Jay Jones	4 receptions, 60 yards
Illinois State	Passing	Tommy Rittenhouse	12/22, 134 yards, 1 INT
Illinois State	Rushing	Victor Dawson	14 carries, 25 yards
Illinois State	Receiving	Dylan Lord	4 receptions, 67 yards

=== NCAA Division I playoffs ===
==== at No. 17т Southeastern Louisiana (NCAA Division I Playoffs – First round) ====
No. 17т Illinois State Redbirds (8–4) at No. 17т (16) Southeastern Louisiana Lions (9–3) – Game summary

Quarter	1	2	3	4	Total
No. 17т Redbirds	7	0	7	7	21
No. 17т (16) Lions	0	3	0	0	3

at Strawberry Stadium • Hammond, LA

- Date: November 29
- Game time: 12:00 PM
- Game weather: Cloudy • Temperature: 67 °F (19 °C) • Wind: SE at 13 miles per hour (21 km/h)
- Game attendance: 3,321
- Referee: Jeff Pumphrey
- TV announcers (ESPN+): Jack Benjamin (play-by-play), Forrest Conoly (analyst)
- Box score

Game information
First quarter
- ILS – Tommy Rittenhouse 6-yard run (Matt Maldonado kick), 12:46. Redbirds 7–0. Drive: 6 plays, 80 yards, 2:07.

Second quarter

- SLU – Guillermo Garcia Rodriguez 40-yard field goal, 14:55. Redbirds 7–3. Drive: 16 plays, 69 yards, 7:22.

Third quarter

- ILS – Daniel Sobkowicz 1-yard pass from Rittenhouse (Maldonado kick), 8:48. Redbirds 14–3. Drive: 10 plays, 37 yards, 4:33.

Fourth quarter

- ILS – Seth Glatz 1-yard run (Maldonado kick), 2:30. Redbirds 21–3. Drive: 9 plays, 46 yards, 2:28.

Statistics	ILS	SLU
First downs	17	18
Total yards	292	321
Rushing yards	145	107
Passing yards	147	214
Passing: Comp–Att–Int	15–23–0	24–39–4
Time of possession	28:21	31:39

Team	Category	Player	Statistics
Illinois State	Passing	Tommy Rittenhouse	14/22, 146 yards
Illinois State	Rushing	Victor Dawson	11 carries, 72 yards
Illinois State	Receiving	Daniel Sobkowicz	8 receptions, 89 yards
Southeastern Louisiana	Passing	Carson Camp	14/21, 120 yards, 3 INT
Southeastern Louisiana	Rushing	Jaedon Henry	8 carries, 45 yards
Southeastern Louisiana	Receiving	Jaylon Domingeaux	6 receptions, 78 yards

==== at No. 1 North Dakota State (NCAA Division I Playoffs – Second round) ====
No. 17т Illinois State Redbirds (9–4) at No. 1 (1) North Dakota State Bison (12–0) – Game summary

Quarter	1	2	3	4	Total
No. 17т Redbirds	0	14	0	15	29
No. 1 (1) Bison	14	7	0	7	28

at Fargodome • Fargo, ND

- Date: December 6
- Game time: 12:00 PM
- Game weather: Indoors • Temperature: 70 °F (21 °C)
- Game attendance: 10,464
- Referee: Gregg Wilson
- TV announcers (ESPN+): Shawn Kenney (play-by-play), Charles Arbuckle (commentator)
- Box score

Game information
First quarter
- NDS – Bryce Lance 78-yard pass from Cole Payton (Eli Ozick kick), 12:39. Bison 7–0. Drive: 1 plays, 78 yards, 0:11.
- NDS – Jackson Williams 52-yard punt return (Ozick kick), 4:40. Bison 14–0.

Second quarter

- ILS – Victor Dawson 69-yard run (Matt Maldonado kick), 11:21. Bison 14–7. Drive: 4 plays, 86 yards, 2:27.
- NDS – Nathaniel Staehling 73-yard interception return (Ozick kick), 4:40. Bison 21–7.
- ILS – Daniel Sobkowicz 8-yard pass from Tommy Rittenhouse (Maldonado kick), 0:50. Bison 21–14. Drive: 14 plays, 82 yards, 7:14.

Fourth quarter

- NDS – Barika Kpeenu 4-yard run (Ozick kick), 12:38. Bison 28–14. Drive: 1 plays, 4 yards, 0:04.
- ILS – Sobkowicz 8-yard pass from Rittenhouse (Maldonado kick), 2:44. Bison 28–21. Drive: 7 plays, 41 yards, 1:51.
- ILS – Sobkowicz 6-yard pass from Rittenhouse (Scotty Presson Jr pass from Rittenhouse), 1:00. Redbirds 29–28. Drive: 6 plays, 23 yards, 0:51.

Statistics	ILS	NDS
First downs	23	6
Total yards	422	179
Rushing yards	173	59
Passing yards	249	120
Passing: Comp–Att–Int	35–52–5	6–19–0
Time of possession	42:01	17:59

Team	Category	Player	Statistics
Illinois State	Passing	Tommy Rittenhouse	35/52, 249 yards, 3 TD, 5 INT
Illinois State	Rushing	Victor Dawson	23 carries, 137 yards, 1 TD
Illinois State	Receiving	Daniel Sobkowicz	8 receptions, 67 yards, 3 TD
North Dakota State	Passing	Cole Payton	4/12, 101 yards, 1 TD
North Dakota State	Rushing	Barika Kpeenu	16 carries, 55 yards, 1 TD
North Dakota State	Receiving	Bryce Lance	1 reception, 78 yards, 1 TD

==== at No. 11 UC Davis (NCAA Division I Playoffs – Quarterfinals) ====
2025 NCAA Division I FCS Playoffs Quarterfinal
No. 17т Illinois State Redbirds (10–4) at No. 11 (8) UC Davis Aggies (9–3) – Game summary

Quarter	1	2	3	4	Total
No. 17т Redbirds	21	0	14	7	42
No. 11 (8) Aggies	17	0	0	14	31

at UC Davis Health Stadium • Davis, CA

- Date: December 13
- Game time: 4:00 PM
- Game weather: Fog • Temperature: 41 °F (5 °C) • Wind: NE at 3 miles per hour (4.8 km/h)
- Game attendance: 9,216
- Referee: James Brookhart
- TV announcers (ESPN+): Ted Emrich (play-by-play), Rene Ingoglia (analyst)
- Box score

Game information
First quarter
- UCD – Hunter Ridley 35-yard field goal, 13:42. Aggies 3–0. Drive: 5 plays, 57 yards, 1:18.
- ILS – Chris Taylor 91-yard kickoff return (Matt Maldonado kick), 13:30. Redbirds 7–3.
- UCD – Jordan Fisher 23-yard run (Hunter Ridley kick), 11:34. Aggies 10–7. Drive: 6 plays, 75 yards, 1:568.
- ILS – Dylan Lord 37-yard pass from Tommy Rittenhouse (Matt Maldonado kick), 8:49. Redbirds 14–10. Drive: 6 plays, 67 yards, 2:38.
- ILS – Daniel Sobkowicz 93-yard pass from Tommy Rittenhouse (Matt Maldonado kick), 4:21. Redbirds 21–10. Drive: 1 plays, 93 yards, 0:13.
- UCD – Stacy Dobbins 12-yard pass from Caden Pinnick (Hunter Ridley kick), 1:44. Redbirds 21–17. Drive: 7 plays, 59 yards, 2:30.

Second quarter

- No scoring plays.

Third quarter

- ILS – Seth Glatz 1-yard run (Mat Maldonado kick), 9:48. Redbirds 28-17. Drive: 9 plays, 75 yards, 5:12.
- ILS – Daniel Sobkowicz 17-yard pass from Tommy Rittenhouse (Matt Maldonado kick), 2:06. Redbirds 35–17. Drive: 11 plays, 80 yards, 6:50.

Fourth quarter

- ILS – Seth Glatz 58-yard run (Matt Maldonado kick), 3:35. Redbirds 42-17. Drive: 10 plays, 94 yards, 5:59.
- UCD – Jordan Fisher 1-yard pass from Caden Pinnick (pass failed), 2:11. Redbirds 42–23. Drive: 4 plays, 25 yards, 1:13.
- UCD – Stacy Dobbins 24-yard pass from Caden Pinnick (Caden Pinnick–Jordan Fisher pass), 0:47. Redbirds 42–31. Drive: 7 plays, 53 yards, 1:21.

Statistics	ILS	UCD
First downs	26	24
Plays–yards	63–532	65–533
Rushes–yards	42–266	24–131
Passing yards	266	402
Passing: Comp–Att–Int	15–21–1	29–41–1
Turnovers	1	2
Time of possession	35:45	24:15

Team	Category	Player	Statistics
Illinois State	Passing	Tommy Rittenhouse	15/20, 266 yards, 3 TD, INT
Illinois State	Rushing	Victor Dawson	29 carries, 148 yards
Illinois State	Receiving	Daniel Sobkowicz	6 receptions, 150 yards, 2 TD
UC Davis	Passing	Caden Pinnick	29/41, 402 yards, 3 TD, INT
UC Davis	Rushing	Jordan Fisher	13 carries, 70 yards, TD
UC Davis	Receiving	Stacy Dobbins	10 receptions, 121 yards, 2 TD

==== at No. 9 Villanova (NCAA Division I Playoffs – Semifinals) ====
2025 NCAA Division I FCS Playoffs Semifinal
No. 17т Illinois State Redbirds (11–4) at No. 9 (12) Villanova Wildcats (12–2) – Game summary

Quarter	1	2	3	4	Total
No. 17т Redbirds	7	14	6	3	30
No. 9 (12) Wildcats	0	6	0	8	14

at Villanova Stadium • Villanova, PA

- Date: December 20
- Game time: 6:30 PM
- Game weather: Clear • Temperature: 31 °F (−1 °C) • Wind: S at 14 miles per hour (23 km/h)
- Game attendance: 4,133
- Referee: Zachary Erdmann
- TV announcers (ESPN2): Lowell Galindo (play-by-play), Aaron Murray (analyst), Lauren Sisler (sideline)
- Box score

Game information
First quarter
- ILS – Daniel Sobkowicz 53-yard pass from Tommy Rittenhouse (Michael Cosentino kick), 2:36. Redbirds 7–0. Drive: 8 plays, 80 yards, 3:58.

Second quarter

- VILL – Jack Barnum 23-yard field goal, 14:56. Redbirds 7–3. Drive: 8 plays, 61 yards, 2:36.
- ILS – Victor Dawson 1-yard run (Cosentino kick), 8:43. Redbirds 14-3. Drive: 13 plays, 65 yards, 6:13.
- VILL – Barnum 35-yard field goal, 4:51. Redbirds 14–6. Drive: 9 plays, 47 yards, 3:48.
- ILS – Sobkowicz 8-yard pass from Rittenhouse (Cosentino kick), 3:49. Redbirds 21–6. Drive: 3 plays, 76 yards, 0:57.

Third quarter

- ILS – Cosentino 35-yard field goal, 11:03. Redbirds 24–6. Drive: 8 plays, 57 yards, 3:52.
- ILS – Cosentino 29-yard field goal, 0:02. Redbirds 27–6. Drive: 16 plays, 57 yards, 8:21.

Fourth quarter

- ILS – Cosentino 30-yard field goal, 5:10. Redbirds 30–6. Drive: 13 plays, 53 yards, 7:53.
- VILL – Antonio Johnson 16-yard pass from Pat McQuaide (Braden Reed pass from McQuaide), 3:18. Redbirds 30–14. Drive: 8 plays, 77 yards, 1:48.

Statistics	ILS	VILL
First downs	26	15
Plays–yards	81–426	54–300
Rushes–yards	43–175	24–101
Passing yards	251	100
Passing: Comp–Att–Int	18–38–1	13–30–1
Turnovers	1	1
Time of possession	39:43	20:17

Team	Category	Player	Statistics
Illinois State	Passing	Tommy Rittenhouse	18/38, 251 yards, 2 TD, INT
Illinois State	Rushing	Victor Dawson	34 carries, 155 yards
Illinois State	Receiving	Daniel Sobkowicz	7 receptions, 97 yards, 2 TD
Villanova	Passing	Pat McQuaide	13/30, 199 yards, TD, INT
Villanova	Rushing	Ja'briel Mace	11 carries, 59 yards
Villanova	Receiving	Luke Colella	4 receptions, 58 yards

==== vs. No. 2 Montana State (2026 NCAA Division I Football Championship Game) ====
2026 NCAA Division I Football Championship Game
No. 17т Illinois State Redbirds (12–4) vs. No. 2 (2) Montana State Bobcats (13–2) – Game summary

Quarter	1	2	3	4	OT	Total
No. 17т Redbirds	0	7	7	14	6	34
No. 2 (2) Bobcats	7	14	7	0	7	35

at FirstBank Stadium • Nashville, TN

- Date: January 5, 2026
- Game time: 6:30 PM
- Game weather: Clear • Temperature: 57 °F (14 °C) • Wind: S at 7 miles per hour (11 km/h)
- Game attendance: 24,105
- Referee: James Brookhart
- TV announcers (ESPN): Dave Flemming (play-by-play), Brock Osweiler (analyst), Stormy Buonantony (sideline), Matt Austin (rules analyst)
- Box score

Game information
First quarter
- MTST – Justin Lamson 3-yard run (Myles Sansted kick), 4:51. Bobcats 7–0. Drive: 10 plays, 90 yards, 5:50.

Second quarter

- MTST – Justin Lamson 2-yard run (Myles Sansted kick), 10:49. Bobcats 14–0. Drive: 8 plays, 80 yards, 3:26.
- ILS – Scotty Presson Jr. 6-yard pass from Tommy Rittenhouse (Michael Cosentino kick), 0:54. Bobcats 14–7. Drive: 10 plays, 80 yards, 4:23.
- MTST – Dane Steel 33-yard pass from Justin Lamson (Myles Sansted kick), 0:18. Bobcats 21–7. Drive: 3 plays, 75 yards, 0:36.

Third quarter

- ILS – Logan Brasfield 1-yard run (Michael Consentino kick), 5:32. Bobcats 21–14. Drive: 17 plays, 85 yards, 7:32.
- MTST – Taco Dowler 22-yard run (Myles Sansted kick), 3:18. Bobcats 28–14. Drive: 6 plays, 64 yards, 2:08.

Fourth quarter

- ILS – Daniel Sobkowicz 4-yard pass from Tommy Rittenhouse (Michael Cosentino kick), 10:13. Bobcats 28–21. Drive: 15 plays, 81 yards, 8:01.
- ILS – Dylan Lord 25-yard pass from Tommy Rittenhouse (Michael Cosentino kick), 5:10. Tied 28–28. Drive: 8 plays, 60 yards, 3:52.

Overtime

- ILS – Dylan Lord 10-yard pass from Tommy Rittenhouse (kick blocked). Redbirds 34–28. Drive: 2 plays, 25 yards.
- MTST – Taco Dowler 14-yard pass from Justin Lamson (Myles Sansted kick). Bobcats 35–34. Drive: 5 plays, 25 yards.

Statistics	ILS	MTST
First downs	33	20
Plays–yards	71–471	51–381
Rushes–yards	38–160	24–101
Passing yards	311	280
Passing: Comp–Att–Int	33–46–0	18–27–0
Turnovers	0	0
Time of possession	39:41	20:19

Team	Category	Player	Statistics
Illinois State	Passing	Tommy Rittenhouse	33/46, 311 yards, 4 TD
Illinois State	Rushing	Victor Dawson	29 carries, 126 yards
Illinois State	Receiving	Dylan Lord	13 receptions, 161 yards, 2 TD
Montana State	Passing	Justin Lamson	18/27, 280 yards, 2 TD
Montana State	Rushing	Adam Jones	5 carries, 46 yards
Montana State	Receiving	Taco Dowler	8 receptions, 111 yards, TD

== Rankings ==
Ranking movements Legend: ██ Increase in ranking ██ Decrease in ranking т = Tied with team above or below
	Week														
Poll	Pre	1	2	3	4	5	6	7	8	9	10	11	12	13	Final
STATS FCS	6	7	7	6	7	6	9	10	18	17	16	14	11	17т	2
Coaches	6	7	4	4	5	6	10	9	20	18	17	13	11т	17	2
