= Guillory =

Guillory is a surname. Notable people with the surname include:

- Anthony Guillory (1942–2021), American football player
- Ben Guillory (born 1949), American actor, producer
- Courtland Guillory (born 2006), American football player
- Curtis Guillory, American bishop
- Elbert Guillory (born 1944), Louisiana politician
- Isaac Guillory (1947–2000), American folk guitarist
- Jacobian Guillory (born 2000), American football player
- Jahking Guillory, American actor
- John Guillory (born 1952), American literary critic
- John Guillory (born 1945), American football player
- Lorilei Guillory, subject of the 2003 play Lorilei
- Matt Guillory (born 1974), American musician
- Sienna Guillory (born 1975), English actress and model
- Xavier Guillory (born 2001), American football player
