= Blaylock =

Blaylock is a family name which may have originated in north-west England and Scotland. People with this family name include:

- Anthony Blaylock (born 1965), American football cornerback
- Audie Blaylock (born 1962), American bluegrass musician
- Bob Blaylock (1935–2024), American baseball pitcher
- Cheryl Blaylock (born 1953), American puppeteer, actress and comedian
- Chet Blaylock (1924–1996), American politician
- Derrick Blaylock (born 1979), American football running back
- Gary Blaylock (1931–2026), American baseball pitcher
- James Blaylock (born 1950), American fantasy author
- Jeannie Blaylock, American TV news anchor
- Josh Blaylock (born 1990), American actor
- Len E. Blaylock (1918–2012), American farmer, educator, small businessman and politician
- Louis Blaylock (1849–1932), American publisher, civil leader and mayor of Dallas, Texas
- Marv Blaylock (1929–1993), American baseball first baseman
- Mattie Blaylock (Celia Ann Blaylock) (1850–1888), American prostitute, companion of Wyatt Earp
- Mookie Blaylock (born 1967), American basketball player
- Ron Blaylock (born 1939), American football coach
- Russell Blaylock (born 1945), American neurosurgeon, author, lecturer, and newsletter editor
- Selwyn G. Blaylock (1879–1945), Canadian metallurgist and mining company president
- Tory Blaylock (born 2006), American football player

== See also ==
- Blaylock Sandstone, geological formation in Arkansas and Oklahoma
- Blalock (surname)
- Blelloch (surname)
