= Blalock (surname) =

Blalock, meaning "dark-haired person" (Middle English Blakelok), is an English surname. It may refer to:

- Alfred Blalock (1899–1964), American innovator in the field of medical science
- Bradley Blalock (born 2000), American baseball player
- Hank Blalock (born 1980), American baseball third baseman
- Hubert M. Blalock Jr. (1926–1991), American sociologist
- Jane Blalock (born 1945), American professional golfer
- Joe Blalock (1919–1974), American football player
- Jolene Blalock (born 1975), American actress
- Justin Blalock (born 1983), American football offensive guard
- Malinda Blalock (c. 1839–c. 1901), female soldier during the American Civil War
- Patricia Swift Blalock (1914–2011), American librarian, social worker, and civil rights activist
- Will Blalock (born 1983), American basketball player

== See also ==
- Blaylock
- Blelloch
