= Dr. Nathan M. Blalock House =

Historic house in North Carolina, United States

- U.S. National Register of Historic Places
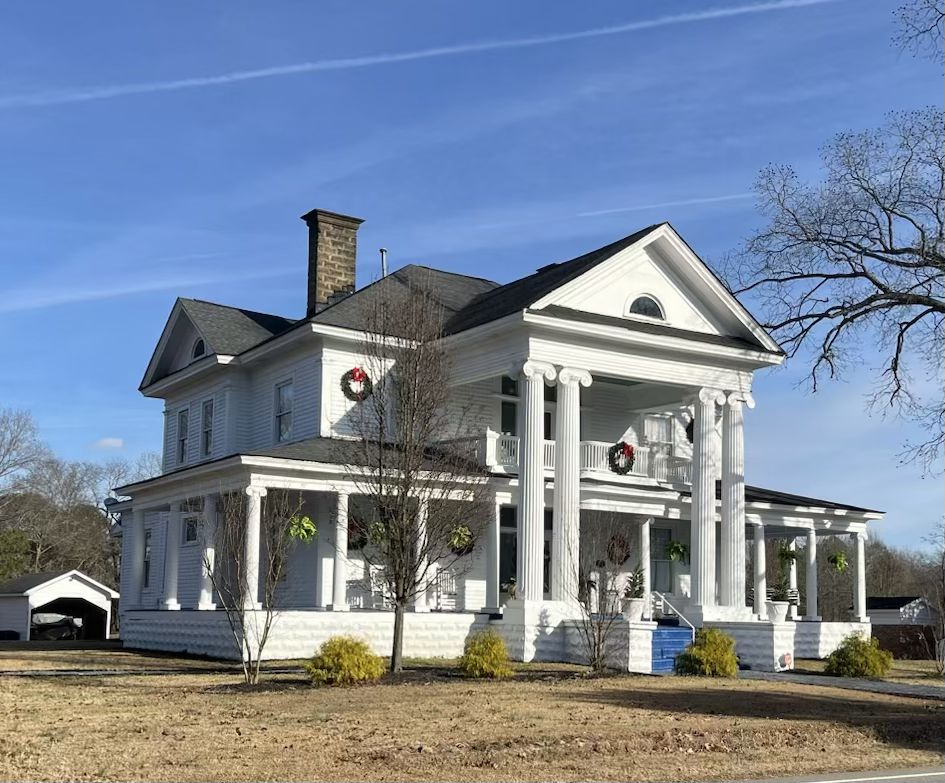

- Location within North Carolina Location within the United States
- Location: 6741 Rock Service Station Rd., near Raleigh, North Carolina
- Coordinates: 35°35′42″N 78°38′49″W
- Area: 1 acre (0.40 ha)
- Built: c. 1910
- Built by: Jacobs, William
- Architectural style: Classical Revival
- MPS: Wake County MPS
- NRHP reference No.: 05001449
- Added to NRHP: December 23, 2005

Dr. Nathan M. Blalock House is a historic home located near Raleigh, Wake County, North Carolina. It was built about 1910, and is a two-story, double-pile, Classical Revival-style frame dwelling with a hipped roof. The front facade features a full height, projecting pedimented portico supported by two pairs of fluted wood Ionic order columns and one-story wraparound porch. Also on the property are the contributing well house (c. 1910) and wall (c. 1910).

It was listed on the National Register of Historic Places in 2005.
