= Blelloch =

Blelloch is a surname. Notable people with the surname include:

- Guy Blelloch, American professor of computer science
- Ian Blelloch (1901–1982), British colonial administrator in Malaya
- Sir John Blelloch (1930–2017), British civil servant

== See also ==
- Blaylock
