= Blalock, Georgia =

Unincorporated community in Georgia, U.S.

Coordinates: 34°53′35″N 83°30′49″W

Blalock is an unincorporated community in Rabun County, in the U.S. state of Georgia.

== History ==
A post office called Blalock was established in 1888, and remained in operation until 1934. The community was located inland away from railroads.
