= Robert L. Blalock House =

Historic house in North Carolina, United States

- U.S. National Register of Historic Places
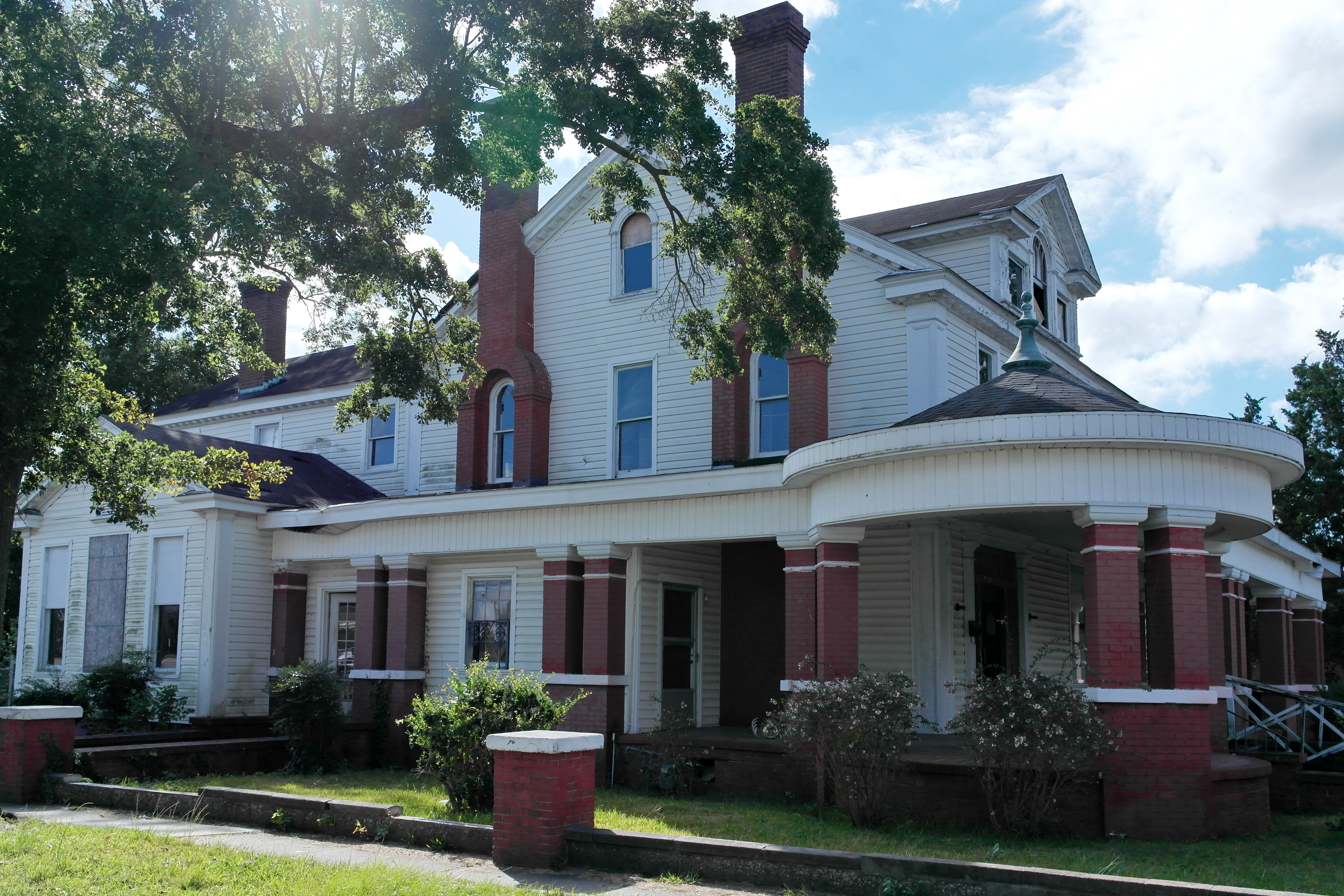
- Robert L. Blalock House, September 2013

- Location within North Carolina Location within the United States
- Location: 300 S. McLewean St., Kinston, North Carolina
- Coordinates: 35°15′25″N 77°34′47″W
- Area: 0.4 acres (0.16 ha)
- Built: 1914
- Built by: Robert L. Blalock
- Architectural style: Classical Revival, Greek Revival
- MPS: Kinston MPS
- NRHP reference No.: 89001772
- Added to NRHP: November 8, 1989

Robert L. Blalock House is a historic home located at Kinston, Lenoir County, North Carolina. It consists of the original two-story, three-bay, double-pile, side-hall-plan Greek Revival style main block dated to the 1850s, and a large, two-story rear ell. It has a one-story gable-roofed wing and a small shed-roofed room north of the rear ell and a complex arrangement of one- and two-story additions and enclosed porches to the south. The house was renovated in the 1920s in the Classical Revival style. It features a full-width front porch supported by groups of square-section brick columns with a round corner pavilion and porte-cochère. It has housed a funeral home since 1947.

It was listed on the National Register of Historic Places in 1989.
