= Xavier Robinson =

American football player

No. 21 – Oklahoma Sooners
- Position: Running back
- Class: Junior

Personal information
- Listed height: 6 ft 0 in (1.83 m)
- Listed weight: 232 lb (105 kg)

Career information
- High school: Carl Albert (Midwest City, Oklahoma)
- College: Oklahoma (2024–present)
- Stats at ESPN

Xavier Robinson is an American college football running back for the Oklahoma Sooners.

== Early life ==
Robinson attended Carl Albert High School in Oklahoma. As a junior, he rushed for 2,594 rushing yards and 41 total touchdowns and led his team to a class 5A state title. Coming out of high school, Robinson was rated as a three-star recruit and committed to play college football for the Oklahoma Sooners over offers from Iowa State and Oklahoma State.

== College career ==
In week 10 of the 2024 season, Robinson rushed six times for 29 yards and a touchdown, while also hauling in a reception for 46 yards, in a win over Maine. In an increased role in week 11, he ran nine times for 56 yards and made one catch for seven yards against Missouri. In week 13, Robinson rushed for 107 yards and two touchdowns on 18 carries, all career highs, as he helped the Sooners upset No. 7 Alabama. For his performance, Robinson was named the Southeastern Conference (SEC) freshman of the week.
