= Tory Blaylock =

American football player (born 2006)

No. 6 – Oklahoma Sooners
- Position: Running back
- Class: Freshman

Personal information
- Born: September 21, 2006 (age 20)
- Listed height: 5 ft 11 in (1.80 m)
- Listed weight: 203 lb (92 kg)

Career information
- High school: Atascocita (Humble, Texas)
- College: Oklahoma (2025–present)
- Stats at ESPN

Tory Blaylock (born September 21, 2006) is an American college football running back for the Oklahoma Sooners.

== Early life ==
Blaylock attended Atascocita High School located in Humble, Texas. Coming out of high school, he was rated as a four-star recruit, and the 291st overall player in the class of 2025, where he committed to play college football for the Oklahoma Sooners over other offers from schools such as Georgia, Oregon, Miami, Notre Dame, Wisconsin, Penn State, FSU, Texas, Tennessee, Ohio State, Alabama, and Texas A&M.

== College career ==
Heading into the 2025 season, he was named the team's backup running back, set to get significant playing time. In week one of the 2025 season, Blaylock rushed for 42 yards and his first career touchdown on eight carries in a win against Illinois State. In week two, he ran for 24 yards in a key-victory over Michigan. In week three, Blaylock rushed for 100 yards and two touchdowns on 14 carries in a win over Temple.
