= Keontez Lewis =

American football player (born 2003)

No. 9 – Tampa Bay Buccaneers
- Position: Wide receiver
- Roster status: Active

Personal information
- Born: July 9, 2003 (age 23)
- Listed height: 6 ft 1 in (1.85 m)
- Listed weight: 191 lb (87 kg)

Career information
- High school: East St. Louis (East St. Louis, Illinois)
- College: UCLA (2021); Wisconsin (2022–2023); Southern Illinois (2024); Oklahoma (2025)
- Stats at ESPN

Keontez Lewis (born July 9, 2003) is an American football wide receiver for the Tampa Bay Buccaneers in the National Football League (NFL). Lewis played college football for the Oklahoma Sooners, And went undrafted in the 2026 NFL Draft. He also played for the UCLA Bruins, Wisconsin Badgers and, Southern Illinois Salukis.

== Early life ==
Lewis attended East St. Louis Senior High School in East St. Louis, Illinois. As a junior in 2019, he had 38 receptions for 809 receiving yards and 10 touchdowns. He committed to University of California, Los Angeles (UCLA) to play college football.

== College career ==
Lewis spent one season with UCLA, playing in 11 games. He transferred to the University of Wisconsin after the season. In his first year at Wisconsin, he played in all 13 games and had 20 receptions for 313 receiving yards and three touchdowns. In 2023, Lewis entered the transfer portal after playing in one game. He transferred to Southern Illinois University and in his lone season there, starting nine of 11 games, recording a team-leading 49 receptions for 813 yards and five touchdowns. After the season, Lewis entered the portal again and transferred to the University of Oklahoma. He entered the 2025 season as a starter and had nine receptions for 119 yards and two touchdowns in his debut.

== Professional career ==
Pre-draft measurables
Height	Weight	Arm length	Hand span	Wingspan	40-yard dash	10-yard split	20-yard split	20-yard shuttle	Three-cone drill	Vertical jump	Broad jump
6 ft 1 1/4 in (1.86 m)	191 lb (87 kg)	31 1/2 in (0.80 m)	9 7/8 in (0.25 m)	6 ft 4 1/8 in (1.93 m)	4.61 s	1.56 s	2.76 s	4.27 s	7.38 s	34.0 in (0.86 m)	10 ft 3 in (3.12 m)
All values from Pro Day
