= Deion Burks =

American football player (born 2003)

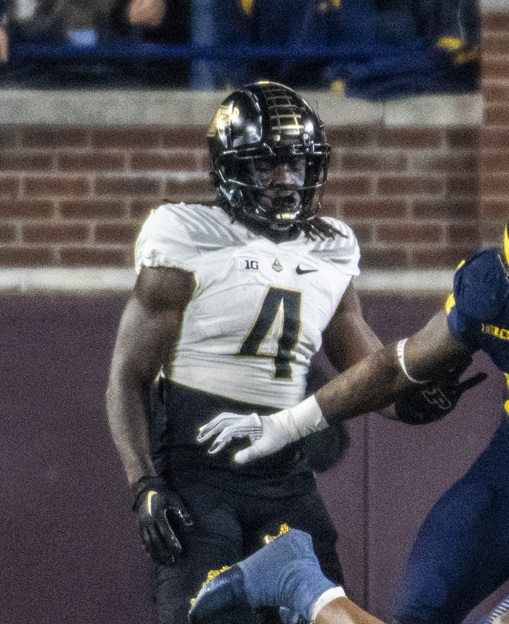
- Burks with Purdue in 2023

No. 80 – Indianapolis Colts
- Position: Wide receiver
- Roster status: Active

Personal information
- Born: January 8, 2003 (age 23)
- Listed height: 5 ft 9 in (1.75 m)
- Listed weight: 180 lb (82 kg)

Career information
- High school: Belleville (Belleville, Michigan)
- College: Purdue (2021–2023); Oklahoma (2024–2025)
- NFL draft: 2026: 7th round, 254th overall pick

Career history
- Indianapolis Colts (2026–present)

Awards and highlights
- Second-team All-Big Ten (2023)

Career NFL statistics as of Week 4, 2026
- Rushing yards: 14
- Rushing average: 7
- Receptions: 1
- Receiving yards: 6
- Stats at Pro Football Reference

Deion Burks (born January 8, 2003) is an American professional football wide receiver for the Indianapolis Colts of the National Football League (NFL). He played college football for the Purdue Boilermakers and Oklahoma Sooners and was selected by the Colts in the seventh round of the 2026 NFL draft.

== Early life ==
Burks attended Belleville High School in Belleville, Michigan. He committed to Purdue University to play college football.

== College career ==
After appearing in four games his first year at Purdue in 2021 with no catches, Burks played in all 14 games in 2022 and had 15 receptions for 149 yards. In 2023, he was Purdue's leading receiver with 47 receptions for 629 yards and seven touchdowns. After the 2023 NCAA football season, he transferred to the University of Oklahoma.

== Professional career ==
Pre-draft measurables
| Height | Weight | Arm length | Hand span | Wingspan | 40-yard dash | 10-yard split | 20-yard split | 20-yard shuttle | Three-cone drill | Vertical jump | Broad jump | Bench press |
|---|---|---|---|---|---|---|---|---|---|---|---|---|
| 5 ft 9 3/4 in (1.77 m) | 180 lb (82 kg) | 29 3/8 in (0.75 m) | 9 1/2 in (0.24 m) | 6 ft 0 3/4 in (1.85 m) | 4.30 s | 1.49 s | 2.50 s | 4.22 s | 7.21 s | 42.5 in (1.08 m) | 10 ft 11 in (3.33 m) | 26 reps |
All values from NFL Combine/Pro Day

Burks was selected by the Indianapolis Colts in the seventh round with the 254th-overall pick of the 2026 NFL draft. He signed his rookie contract on May 8.
