= Courtland Guillory =

American football player (born 2006)

No. 4 – Oklahoma Sooners
- Position: Cornerback
- Class: Freshman

Personal information
- Born: September 30, 2006 (age 20)
- Listed height: 6 ft 0 in (1.83 m)
- Listed weight: 183 lb (83 kg)

Career information
- High school: Klein Oak (Klein, Texas)
- College: Oklahoma (2025–present)
- Stats at ESPN

Courtland Guillory (born September 30, 2006) is an American college football cornerback for the Oklahoma Sooners.

== Career ==
Guillory attended Klein Oak High School in Klein, Texas. As a senior, he was the 2024 District 15-6A MVP. He committed to the University of Oklahoma to play college football.

Guillory entered his true freshman year at Oklahoma in 2025 as a starter. He was the first true freshman to start a season opener for the Sooners since 2015.
