= 2026 Tennessee Volunteers football team =

American college football season

2026 Tennessee Volunteers football
- Conference: Southeastern Conference

Ranking
- Coaches: No. 7
- AP: No. 7
- CFP: No. 9
- Record: 9–2 (6–2 SEC)
- Head coach: Josh Heupel (6th season)
- Offensive coordinator: Joey Halzle (4th season)
- Offensive scheme: Veer and shoot
- Defensive coordinator: Jim Knowles (1st season)
- Co-defensive coordinator: Anthony Poindexter (1st season)
- Base defense: 4–2–5
- Home stadium: Neyland Stadium

2026 Southeastern Conference football standings
	Conf.			Overall
Team	W		L	W		L
No. 1 Georgia y	8	–	1	10	–	1
No. 5 Texas	6	–	2	9	–	2
No. 9 Tennessee	6	–	2	9	–	2
No. 3 Alabama	6	–	2	9	–	2
No. 22 Oklahoma	5	–	3	7	–	4
No. 24 Florida	5	–	4	7	–	4
No. 16 Kentucky	5	–	4	7	–	4
No. 25 Ole Miss	4	–	4	7	–	4
Auburn	4	–	4	7	–	4
Missouri	4	–	4	7	–	4
No. 21 South Carolina	4	–	5	6	–	5
LSU	3	–	5	6	–	5
Mississippi State	2	–	6	5	–	6
Arkansas	2	–	6	4	–	7
Texas A&M	1	–	7	4	–	7
Vanderbilt	1	–	7	4	–	7
Championship: Georgia vs TBD
^ – College Football Playoff participant; $ – Conference champion; y – Championship game participant; As of November 22, 2026; Rankings from CFP rankings

The 2026 Tennessee Volunteers football team represents the University of Tennessee in the Southeastern Conference (SEC) during the 2026 NCAA Division I FBS football season. The Volunteers are led by sixth-year head coach Josh Heupel. The team plays home games at Neyland Stadium, located in Knoxville, Tennessee.

== Offseason ==
=== 2026 NFL draft ===
Round	Pick	Player	Position	Team
2	37	Colton Hood	CB	New York Giants
3	83	Chris Brazzell II	WR	Carolina Panthers
4	101	Jermod McCoy	CB	Las Vegas Raiders
5	147	Joshua Josephs	DE	Washington Commanders
7	222	Tyre West	DE	Detroit Lions

=== Transfers ===
==== Outgoing ====
Player	Position	Destination
Max Anderson	IOL	Kentucky
Brenden Anes	LB	Western Michigan
Kaleb Beasley	S	Louisville
Colin Brazzell	CB	Abilene Christian
Arion Carter	LB	Withdrawn
Boo Carter	S	Colorado
Trevor Duncan	OT	The Citadel
Rickey Gibson III	CB	Texas A&M
Max Gilbert	K	Arkansas
Marcus Goree Jr.	CB	Troy
Brian Grant	OT	Memphis
Herb Gray	DL	UNLV
Braylon Harmon	WR	Austin Peay
Lance Heard	OT	Kentucky
Caleb Herring	DL	South Carolina
Amari Jefferson	WR	Unknown
Peyton Lewis	RB	Virginia
Kellen Lindstrom	DL	Missouri State
Jayden Loftin	DL	Wisconsin
Jake Merklinger	QB	UConn
Emmanuel Okoye	DL	California
Jordan Ross	DL	LSU
William Satterwhite II	IOL	LSU
Josh Schell	DL	UCF
Jack Van Dorselaer	TE	Oklahoma
Jamal Wallace	DL	Utah
Bennett Warren	OT	Minnesota
Trey Weary	WR	East Tennessee State
Tommy Winton III	WR	East Tennessee State

==== Incoming ====
Player	Position	Former Team
DJ Burks	S	Appalachian State
Amare Campbell	LB	Penn State
Chaz Coleman	DL	Penn State
Ian Duarte	WR	Idaho State
Xavier Gilliam	DL	Penn State
Javin Gordon	RB	Tulane
Isaiah Hardge	CB	Colorado
Donovan Haslam	IOL	West Virginia
Blake Howard	LS	Eastern Kentucky
Dejuan Lane	S	Penn State
Kayin Lee	CB	Auburn
Drake Martinez	TE	UT Martin
Tevis Metcalf	CB	Michigan
TJ Metcalf	S	Michigan
Qua Moss	S	Kansas State
Jordan Norman	DL	Tulane
Cooper Ranvier	K	Louisville
Jadais Richard	CB	Miami (FL)
Ryan Staub	QB	Colorado
Trent Thomas	TE	South Alabama
Ory Williams	OT	LSU

== Schedule ==
Date	Time	Opponent	Rank	Site	TV	Result	Attendance
September 5	3:30 p.m.	Furman*	No. 20	Neyland Stadium; Knoxville, TN	SECN+	W 56–9	101,915
September 12	7:00 p.m.	at Georgia Tech*	No. 18	Bobby Dodd Stadium; Atlanta, GA (rivalry)	ESPN	W 45–24	52,113
September 19	7:45 p.m.	Kennesaw State*	No. 15	Neyland Stadium; Knoxville, TN	SECN	W 42–9	101,915
September 26	12:00 p.m.	No. 1 Texas	No. 14	Neyland Stadium; Knoxville, TN (College GameDay)	ABC	L 17–20	101,915
October 3	3:30 p.m.	Auburn	No. 17	Neyland Stadium; Knoxville, TN (rivalry)	ESPN	W 24–14	101,915
October 10	4:15 p.m.	at Arkansas	No. 15	Donald W. Reynolds Razorback Stadium; Fayetteville, AR	SECN	W 24–17	69,038
October 17	3:30 p.m.	No. 6 Alabama	No. 14	Neyland Stadium; Knoxville, TN (Third Saturday in October, SEC Nation)	ABC	W 26–10	101,915
October 24	3:30 p.m.	at South Carolina	No. 11	Williams–Brice Stadium; Columbia, SC	ESPN	L 24–27	79,193
November 7	6:15 p.m.	No. 6 Kentucky	No. 13	Neyland Stadium; Knoxville, TN (rivalry)	ESPN	W 34–6	101,915
November 14	3:00 p.m.	at Texas A&M	No. 8	Kyle Field; College Station, TX	ESPN	W 22–7	108,504
November 21	3:30 p.m.	LSU	No. 9	Neyland Stadium; Knoxville, TN	ABC	W 27–13	101,915
November 28	7:00 p.m.	at Vanderbilt		FirstBank Stadium; Nashville, TN (rivalry)	ESPN		
*Non-conference game; Rankings from AP Poll (and CFP Rankings, after November 3) - Released prior to game; All times are in Eastern time

== Rankings ==
Ranking movements Legend: ██ Increase in ranking ██ Decrease in ranking
	Week															
Poll	Pre	1	2	3	4	5	6	7	8	9	10	11	12	13	14	Final
AP	20	18	15	14	17	15	14	11	16	16	9	9	7			
Coaches	18	18	14	13	17	14	14	11	17	16	9	9	7			
CFP	Not released									13	8	9				Not released

== Game summaries ==
=== vs Furman (FCS) ===
Furman Paladins (FCS) (1–0) at No. 20 Tennessee Volunteers (0–0) – Game summary

Quarter	1	2	3	4	Total
Paladins (FCS)	0	0	3	6	9
No. 20 Volunteers	7	21	21	7	56

at Neyland Stadium • Knoxville, Tennessee

- Date: September 5
- Game time: 3:30 p.m.
- Game weather: Sunny • Temperature: 90 °F (32 °C)
- Game attendance: 101,915
- Referee: Marc Curles
- TV announcers (SECN+): Richard Cross, Max Starks and Ashlyn Sullivan

Game information

First quarter

- TENN – Ethan Davis 17-yard pass from Faizon Brandon (Cooper Ranvier kick), 10:42. Volunteers 7–0. Drive: 8 plays, 60 yards, 2:59.

Second quarter

- TENN – Faizon Brandon 6-yard run (Cooper Ranvier kick), 11:14. Volunteers 14–0. Drive: 7 plays, 42 yards, 3:00.
- TENN – DeSean Bishop 1-yard run (Cooper Ranvier kick), 3:05. Volunteers 21–0. Drive: 11 plays, 66 yards, 4:51.
- TENN – Faizon Brandon 7-yard run (Cooper Ranvier kick), 0:17. Volunteers 28–0. Drive: 8 plays, 82 yards, 1:26.

Third quarter

- TENN – Mike Matthews 55-yard pass from Faizon Brandon (Cooper Ranvier kick), 13:54. Volunteers 35–0. Drive: 3 plays, 76 yards, 0:59.
- TENN – Mike Matthews 57-yard pass from Faizon Brandon (Cooper Ranvier kick), 11:38. Volunteers 42–0. Drive: 3 plays, 80 yards, 1:05.
- FUR – Nathan Chapman 50-yard field goal, 5:55. Volunteers 42–3. Drive: 6 plays, 5 yards, 3:31.
- TENN – TK Keys 22-yard pass from George MacIntyre (Cooper Ranvier kick), 1:50. Volunteers 49–3. Drive: 10 plays, 75 yards, 4:05.

Fourth quarter

- FUR – Isaiah Davis 23-yard run (run failed), 13:13. Volunteers 49–9. Drive: 3 plays, 16 yards, 0:42.
- TENN – Justin Baker 73-yard run (Josh Turbyville kick), 11:40. Volunteers 56–9. Drive: 3 plays, 90 yards, 1:23.

Statistics	FUR	TENN
First downs	10	29
Plays–yards	58–221	74–638
Rushes–yards	36–178	47–329
Passing yards	43	309
Passing: comp–att–int	11–22–0	21–27–0
Turnovers	0	2
Time of possession	27:51	32:02

Team	Category	Player	Statistics
Furman	Passing	Jake Garcia	8/17, 36 yards
Furman	Rushing	Isaiah Davis	8 carries, 113 yards, TD
Furman	Receiving	Daniel Haughton	4 receptions, 13 yards
Tennessee	Passing	Faizon Brandon	13/17, 226 yards, 3 TD
Tennessee	Rushing	DeSean Bishop	14 carries, 97 yards, TD
Tennessee	Receiving	Mike Matthews	4 receptions, 132 yards, 2 TD

=== at Georgia Tech (rivalry) ===
No. 18 Tennessee Volunteers (1–0) at Georgia Tech Yellow Jackets (0–1) – Game summary

Quarter	1	2	3	4	Total
No. 18 Volunteers	7	17	7	14	45
Yellow Jackets	10	0	7	7	24

at Bobby Dodd Stadium • Atlanta, GA

- Date: September 12
- Game time: 7:00 p.m.
- Game weather: Clear • Temperature: 80 °F (27 °C) • Wind: NE 4 mph
- Game attendance: 52,113
- Referee: Justin Elliot
- TV announcers (ESPN): Bob Wischusen, Louis Riddick, and Stormy Buonantony

Game information

First quarter

- TENN – Ethan Davis 25-yard pass from Faizon Brandon (Cooper Ranvier kick), 12:22. Volunteers 7–0. Drive: 3 plays, 63 yards, 1:19.
- GT – Aidan Birr 30-yard field goal, 6:33. Volunteers 7–3. Drive: 14 plays, 63 yards, 5:49.
- GT – Elijah Sessions 3-yard blocked punt return (Aidan Birr kick), 5:49. Yellow Jackets 10–7.

Second quarter

- TENN – Cooper Ranvier 32-yard field goal, 14:01. Tied 10–10. Drive: 14 plays, 61 yards, 6:48.
- TENN – Dejuan Lane 41-yard interception return (Cooper Ranvier kick), 11:24. Volunteers 17–10.
- TENN – Braylon Staley 20-yard pass from Faizon Brandon (Cooper Ranvier kick), 4:21. Volunteers 24–10. Drive: 6 plays, 55 yards, 1:46.

Third quarter

- TENN – DeSean Bishop 17-yard run (Cooper Ranvier kick), 11:41. Volunteers 31–10. Drive: 8 plays, 75 yards, 3:19.
- GT – Justice Haynes 2-yard pass from Alberto Mendoza (Aidan Birr kick), 7:10. Volunteers 31–17. Drive: 9 plays, 75 yards, 4:31.

Fourth quarter

- TENN – DeSean Bishop 29-yard run (Cooper Ranvier kick), 4:25. Volunteers 38–17. Drive: 3 plays, 23 yards, 0:18.
- GT – Justice Haynes 2-yard run (Aidan Birr kick), 1:39. Volunteers 38–24. Drive: 8 plays, 75 yards, 2:46.
- TENN – Daune Morris 47-yard run (Cooper Ranvier kick), 1:30. Volunteers 45–24. Drive: 1 play, 47 yards, 0:08.

Statistics	TENN	GT
First downs	24	25
Plays–yards	66–447	71–356
Rushes–yards	45–299	31–135
Passing yards	148	221
Passing: comp–att–int	10–21–0	26–40–2
Turnovers	0	2
Time of possession	28:48	31:12

Team	Category	Player	Statistics
Tennessee	Passing	Faizon Brandon	10/21, 148 yards, 2 TD
Tennessee	Rushing	DeSean Bishop	20 carries, 147 yards, 2 TD
Tennessee	Receiving	Radarious Jackson	3 receptions, 64 yards
Georgia Tech	Passing	Alberto Mendoza	26/40, 221 yards, TD, 2 INT
Georgia Tech	Rushing	Justice Haynes	14 carries, 81 yards, TD
Georgia Tech	Receiving	Kevin Roche Jr.	6 receptions, 66 yards

=== vs Kennesaw State ===
Kennesaw State Owls (1–1) at No. 15 Tennessee Volunteers (2–0) – Game summary

Quarter	1	2	3	4	Total
Owls	3	0	0	6	9
No. 15 Volunteers	15	6	14	7	42

at Neyland Stadium • Knoxville, Tennessee

- Date: September 19
- Game time: 7:45 p.m.
- Game weather: Clear • Temperature: 87 °F (31 °C) • Wind: S 2 mph
- Game attendance: 101,915
- Referee: Ted Pitts
- TV announcers (SECN): Dave Neal, Cole Cubelic and Ashley Stroehlein

Statistics	KENN	TENN
First downs	18	26
Plays–yards	64–291	67–446
Rushes–yards	30–102	41–268
Passing yards	189	178
Passing: comp–att–int	22–34–0	18–26–0
Time of possession	30:57	29:03

Team	Category	Player	Statistics
Kennesaw State	Passing	Rickie Collins	22/34, 189 yards
Kennesaw State	Rushing	Rickie Collins	14 carries, 55 yards
Kennesaw State	Receiving	Zion Booker	10 receptions, 78 yards
Tennessee	Passing	Faizon Brandon	18/26, 178 yards, TD
Tennessee	Rushing	Daune Morris	14 carries, 116 yards, TD
Tennessee	Receiving	Braylon Staley	4 receptions, 59 yards, TD

=== vs No. 1 Texas ===
No. 1 Texas Longhorns (3–0) at No. 14 Tennessee Volunteers (3–0) – Game summary

Quarter	1	2	3	4	Total
No. 1 Longhorns	7	3	3	7	20
No. 14 Volunteers	3	0	7	7	17

at Neyland Stadium • Knoxville, Tennessee

- Date: September 26
- Game time: 12:10 p.m.
- Game weather: Clear • Temperature: 72 °F (22 °C) • Wind: S 5 mph
- Game attendance: 101,915
- Referee: Kyle Olson
- TV announcers (ABC): Chris Fowler, Kirk Herbstreit, Holly Rowe, and Laura Rutledge

Game information

First quarter

- (10:58) TEX – Raleek Brown 9-yard run (Gianni Spetic kick), (Drive: 7 plays, 75 yards, 4:02; Texas 7–0)
- (07:40) TEN – Cooper Ranvier 33-yard field goal, (Drive: 9 plays, 60 yards, 3:18; Texas 7–3)

Second quarter

- (14:29) TEX – Gianni Spetic 22-yard field goal, (Drive: 10 plays, 62 yards, 4:21; Texas 10–3)

Third quarter

- (11:14) TEN – Qua Moss 67-yard punt return (Cooper Ranvier kick), (Drive: 3 plays, 3 yards, 2:07; Tied 10–10)
- (09:00) TEX – Gianni Spetic 44-yard field goal, (Drive: 6 plays, 48 yards, 2:14; Texas 13–10)

Fourth quarter

- (5:41) TEX – Raleek Brown 4-yard run (Gianni Spetic kick), (Drive: 8 plays, 60 yards, 4:44; Texas 20–10)
- (1:22) TEN – Mike Matthews 30-yard pass from Faizon Brandon (Cooper Ranvier kick), (Drive: 10 plays, 80 yards, 2:45; Texas 20–17)

Statistics	TEX	TENN
First downs	14	22
Plays–yards	55–262	76–221
Rushes–yards	36–61	44–70
Passing yards	201	151
Passing: comp–att–int	14–19–1	18–32–0
Time of possession	28:37	31:23

Team	Category	Player	Statistics
Texas	Passing	Arch Manning	14/19, 201 yards
Texas	Rushing	Raleek Brown	17 rushes, 72 yards, 2 TD
Texas	Receiving	Ryan Wingo	6 receptions, 74 yards
Tennessee	Passing	Faizon Brandon	17/29, 145 yards, 1 TD
Tennessee	Rushing	Faizon Brandon	23 rushes, 75 yards
Tennessee	Receiving	Mike Matthews	4 receptions, 72 yards, 1 TD

=== vs Auburn (rivalry) ===
Auburn Tigers (3–1) at No. 17 Tennessee Volunteers (3–1) – Game summary

Quarter	1	2	3	4	Total
Tigers	0	7	0	7	14
No. 17 Volunteers	0	3	14	7	24

at Neyland Stadium • Knoxville, Tennessee

- Date: October 3
- Game time: 3:30 p.m.
- Game weather: Cloudy • Temperature: 80 °F (27 °C) • Wind: N 5 miles per hour (8.0 km/h)
- Game attendance: 101,915
- Referee: Steve Marlowe
- TV announcers (ESPN): Bob Wischusen, Louis Riddick, and Stormy Buonantony

Game information

First quarter

No scoring

Second quarter

- TENN – Cooper Ranvier 36-yard field goal, 9:51. Tennessee 3–0. Drive: 10 plays, 24 yards, 4:55.
- AUB – Byrum Brown 7-yard rush (Alex McPherson kick), 3:48. Auburn 7–3. Drive: 4 plays, 19 yards, 1:13.

Third quarter

- TENN – DeSean Bishop 25-yard rush (Cooper Ranvier kick), 8:49. Tennessee 10–7. Drive: 6 plays, 82 yards, 2:46.
- TENN – DeSean Bishop 44-yard rush (Cooper Ranvier kick), 5:15. Tennessee 17–7. Drive: 1 play, 44 yards, 0:10.

Fourth quarter

- AUB – Arlis Boardingham 16-yard pass from Byrum Brown (Alex McPherson kick), 10:57. Tennessee 17–14. Drive: 4 plays, 94 yards, 1:06.
- TENN – DeSean Bishop 5-yard rush (Cooper Ranvier kick), 3:30. Tennessee 24–14. Drive: 5 plays, 24 yards, 3:04.

Statistics	AUB	TENN
First downs	17	17
Plays–yards	65–345	67–323
Rushes–yards	32–186	49–237
Passing yards	159	86
Passing: comp–att–int	22–33–2	11–18–1
Time of possession	28:33	31:37

Team	Category	Player	Statistics
Auburn	Passing	Byrum Brown	22/33, 159 yards, TD, 2 INT
Auburn	Rushing	Byrum Brown	19 carries, 107 yards, TD
Auburn	Receiving	Keshaun Singleton	7 receptions, 54 yards
Tennessee	Passing	George MacIntyre	8/10, 86 yards
Tennessee	Rushing	DeSean Bishop	34 carries, 220 yards, 3 TD
Tennessee	Receiving	Mike Matthews	4 receptions, 57 yards

=== at Arkansas ===
No. 15 Tennessee Volunteers (4–1) at Arkansas Razorbacks (2–3) – Game summary

Quarter	1	2	3	4	Total
No. 15 Volunteers	0	7	3	14	24
Razorbacks	0	0	14	3	17

at Donald W. Reynolds Razorback Stadium • Fayetteville, Arkansas

- Date: October 10
- Game time: 4:15 p.m.
- Game weather: Sunny • Temperature: 85 °F (29 °C) • Wind: NE 6 miles per hour (9.7 km/h)
- Game attendance: 69,038
- Referee: Jeff Heaser
- TV announcers (SECN): Matt Schumacker, Aaron Murray, and Taylor Davis

Statistics	TENN	ARK
First downs	20	15
Plays–yards	64–414	61–288
Rushes–yards	35–167	34–133
Passing yards	247	155
Passing: comp–att–int	18–29–2	15–27–0
Turnovers	3	1
Time of possession	27:56	32:04

Team	Category	Player	Statistics
Tennessee	Passing	George MacIntyre	18/29, 247 yards, TD, 2 INT
Tennessee	Rushing	DeSean Bishop	19 carries, 138 yards, TD
Tennessee	Receiving	DaSaahn Brame	3 receptions, 87 yards
Arkansas	Passing	KJ Jackson	15/27, 155 yards, TD
Arkansas	Rushing	Cam Settles	8 carries, 50 yards
Arkansas	Receiving	Chris Marshall	7 receptions, 56 yards

=== vs No. 6 Alabama (Third Saturday in October) ===
No. 6 Alabama Crimson Tide (5–1) at No. 14 Tennessee Volunteers (5–1) – Game summary

Quarter	1	2	3	4	Total
No. 6 Crimson Tide	0	10	0	0	10
No. 14 Volunteers	9	3	7	7	26

at Neyland Stadium • Knoxville, Tennessee

- Date: October 17
- Game time: 3:30 p.m.
- Game weather: Cloudy • Temperature: 59 °F (15 °C) • Wind: N 10 miles per hour (16 km/h)
- Game attendance: 101,915
- Referee: Tim Barker
- TV announcers (ABC): Sean McDonough, Greg McElroy, and Katie George

Statistics	ALA	TENN
First downs	12	20
Plays–yards	55–201	72–347
Rushes–yards	26–54	41–150
Passing yards	147	197
Passing: comp–att–int	19–29–2	21–31–1
Time of possession	24:16	35:44

Team	Category	Player	Statistics
Alabama	Passing	Keelon Russell	19/29, 147 yards, 1 INT
Alabama	Rushing	Keelon Russell	11 carries, 43 yards, 1 TD
Alabama	Receiving	Marshall Pritchett	6 receptions, 39 yards
Tennessee	Passing	George MacIntyre	21/31, 197 yards, 1 INT
Tennessee	Rushing	DeSean Bishop	32 carries, 159 yards, 2 TD
Tennessee	Receiving	Mike Matthews	7 receptions, 85 yards

=== at South Carolina ===
No. 11 Tennessee Volunteers (6–1) at South Carolina Gamecocks (3–3) – Game summary

Quarter	1	2	3	4	Total
No. 11 Volunteers	0	21	0	3	24
Gamecocks	14	3	0	10	27

at Williams–Brice Stadium • Columbia, South Carolina

- Date: October 24
- Game time: 3:30 p.m. ET
- Game weather: Sunny • Temperature: 71 °F (22 °C) • Wind: NE 9 miles per hour (14 km/h)
- Game attendance: 79,193
- Referee: David Smith
- TV announcers (ESPN): Wes Durham, Dusty Dvoracek, and Taylor McGregor

Statistics	TENN	SC
First downs	21	21
Plays–yards	73–320	63–344
Rushes–yards	50–184	31–134
Passing yards	136	210
Passing: comp–att–int	16–23–0	18–32–1
Turnovers	1	1
Time of possession	34:12	25:48

Team	Category	Player	Statistics
Tennessee	Passing	George MacIntyre	16/23, 136 yards
Tennessee	Rushing	DeSean Bishop	32 carries, 120 yards, TD
Tennessee	Receiving	Braylon Staley	6 receptions, 56 yards
South Carolina	Passing	LaNorris Sellers	18/32, 210 yards, TD, INT
South Carolina	Rushing	LaNorris Sellers	18 carries, 96 yards, 2 TD
South Carolina	Receiving	Mazeo Bennett	6 receptions, 88 yards, TD

=== vs No. 6 Kentucky (rivalry) ===
No. 6 Kentucky Wildcats (7–1) at No. 13 Tennessee Volunteers (6–2) – Game summary

Quarter	1	2	3	4	Total
No. 6 Wildcats	0	6	0	0	6
No. 13 Volunteers	7	3	3	21	34

at Neyland Stadium • Knoxville, Tennessee

- Date: November 7
- Game time: 6:20 p.m.
- Game weather: Clear • Temperature: 54 °F (12 °C) • Wind: E 3 miles per hour (4.8 km/h)
- Game attendance: 101,915
- Referee: Tim Barker
- TV announcers (ESPN): Tom Hart, Roddy Jones, and Quint Kessenich

Statistics	UK	TENN
First downs	20	14
Plays–yards	71–361	52–389
Rushes–yards	37–137	37–240
Passing yards	224	149
Passing: comp–att–int	26–34–1	10–15–0
Time of possession	35:17	24:43

Team	Category	Player	Statistics
Kentucky	Passing	Kenny Minchey	26/34, 224 yards
Kentucky	Rushing	C. J. Baxter	11 rushes, 54 yards
Kentucky	Receiving	Willie Rodriguez	6 catches, 81 yards
Tennessee	Passing	George MacIntyre	9/14, 125 yards
Tennessee	Rushing	DeSean Bishop	25 rushes, 111 yards, 2 TD
Tennessee	Receiving	Braylon Staley	4 catches, 50 yards

=== at Texas A&M ===
No. 8 Tennessee Volunteers (7–2) at Texas A&M Aggies (4–5) – Game summary

Quarter	1	2	3	4	Total
No. 8 Volunteers	3	3	3	13	22
Aggies	0	7	0	0	7

at Kyle Field • College Station, Texas

- Date: November 14
- Game time: 3:00 p.m.
- Game weather: Sunny • Temperature: 64 °F (18 °C) • Wind: E 10 miles per hour (16 km/h)
- Game attendance: 108,504
- Referee: Daniel Gautreaux
- TV announcers (ESPN): Dave Pasch, Dusty Dvoracek, and Taylor McGregor

Statistics	TENN	TAMU
First downs	18	8
Plays–yards	74–310	44–179
Rushes–yards	56–196	19–86
Passing yards	114	93
Passing: comp–att–int	14–18–0	11–25–2
Time of possession	42:11	17:49

Team	Category	Player	Statistics
Tennessee	Passing	George MacIntyre	13/17, 109 yards
Tennessee	Rushing	DeSean Bishop	34 rushes, 98 yards
Tennessee	Receiving	Braylon Staley	4 receptions, 34 yards
Texas A&M	Passing	Marcel Reed	9/22, 71 yards, 1 INT
Texas A&M	Rushing	KJ Edwards	7 rushes, 45 yards, 1 TD
Texas A&M	Receiving	Mario Craver	5 receptions, 49 yards

=== vs LSU ===
LSU Tigers (6–4) at No. 9 Tennessee Volunteers (8–2) – Game summary

Quarter	1	2	3	4	Total
Tigers	6	0	7	0	13
No. 9 Volunteers	0	10	3	14	27

at Neyland Stadium • Knoxville, Tennessee

- Date: November 21
- Game time: 3:30 p.m.
- Game weather: Sunny • Temperature: 70 °F (21 °C) • Wind: SE 3 miles per hour (4.8 km/h)
- Game attendance: 101,915
- Referee: Jason Autrey
- TV announcers (ABC): Sean McDonough (play-by-play), Greg McElroy (analyst), and Katie George (sideline reporter)

Statistics	LSU	TENN
First downs	16	17
Plays–yards	73–265	71–308
Rushes–yards	34–43	43–203
Passing yards	222	105
Passing: comp–att–int	27–39–0	14–28–1
Time of possession	30:29	29:31

Team	Category	Player	Statistics
LSU	Passing	Sam Leavitt	27/39, 222 yards, 1 TD
LSU	Rushing	Dilin Jones	17 rushes, 50 yards
LSU	Receiving	Eugene Wilson III	8 receptions, 43 yards
Tennessee	Passing	George MacIntyre	12/21, 79 yards, 1 TD
Tennessee	Rushing	Faizon Brandon	12 rushes, 124 yards, 2 TD
Tennessee	Receiving	DaSaahn Brame	6 receptions, 41 yards, 1 TD

=== at Vanderbilt (rivalry) ===
Tennessee Volunteers (9–2) at Vanderbilt Commodores (4–7) – Game summary

Quarter	1	2	Total
Volunteers			0
Commodores			0

at FirstBank Stadium • Nashville, Tennessee

- Date: November 28

Statistics	TENN	VAN
First downs		
Plays–yards		
Rushes–yards		
Passing yards		
Passing: comp–att–int		
Time of possession		

Team	Category	Player	Statistics
Tennessee	Passing		
Tennessee	Rushing		
Tennessee	Receiving		
Vanderbilt	Passing		
Vanderbilt	Rushing		
Vanderbilt	Receiving		

== Personnel ==
2026 Tennessee Volunteers football team roster
Players
Coaches
Offense

Pos.	#	Name	Class
TE	0	Ethan Davis	Jr
WR	1	Travis Smith Jr.	So
RB	2	Justin Baker	So
WR	3	Radarious Jackson	So
WR	4	Mike Matthews	Jr
WR	5	TK Keys	Fr
RB	6	Javin Gordon	So
TE	7	DaSaahn Brame	So
QB	8	Ryan Staub	Jr
WR	9	Joakim Dodson	So
QB	11	Faizon Brandon	Fr
QB	12	George MacIntyre	So
QB	13	Mason Phillips	So
WR	14	Braylon Staley	So
RB	17	Daune Morris	So
RB	18	DeSean Bishop	Jr
WR	19	Tyreek King	Fr
RB	24	Hunter Barnes	Sr
WR	26	Doren Sacha	Jr
WR	29	Jack-Henry Jakobik	Jr
WR	30	JaColby Cooper	Fr
WR	31	Lane Cape	Fr
RB	34	Will Rajecki	Fr
WR	35	Ben Petermann	So
WR	36	Nathan Roberts	Jr
WR	38	Brayden Carroll	Fr
TE	44	Drake Martinez	Sr
OL	51	Jeremias Heard	So
OL	55	Antoni Ogumoro	So
OL	56	Sam Pendleton	Jr
OL	58	Nic Moore	So
OL	59	Charlie Powell III	So
OL	60	Thomas Storm	Fr
OL	63	Jeremy George-El	Fr
OL	65	Michael Kostantonov	So
OL	66	Kamari Blair	Fr
OL	69	Donovan Haslam	5th
OL	70	David Sanders Jr.	So
OL	71	Ed Baker	Fr
OL	72	Jesse Perry	So
OL	74	Shamurad Umarov	Jr
OL	75	Wendell Moe Jr.	Sr
OL	77	Ory Williams	Jr
OL	78	Gage Ginther	So
OL	79	Gabriel Osenda	Fr
TE	80	Cole Harrison	So
WR	81	Ian Duarte	Sr
TE	82	Trent Thomas	Sr
WR	85	Luke Thompson	Fr
TE	87	Luca Wolf	Fr
WR	88	Deon Hardin	Sr

Defense

Pos.	#	Name	Class
LB	0	Amare Campbell	Sr
DB	1	TJ Metcalf	Sr
DL	2	Xavier Gilliam	Jr
DB	3	Tre Poteat	So
DB	4	Ty Redmond	So
DL	5	Daevin Hobbs	Sr
DB	6	Qua Moss	Sr
LB	7	Arion Carter	Sr
DB	8	Jadais Richard	Sr
DL	9	Mariyon Dye	So
DB	10	Dejuan Lane	Jr
LB	11	Jordan Burns	So
LB	12	Jaedon Harmon	So
LB	13	Edwin Spillman	So
DB	14	Kayin Lee	Sr
DB	15	Edrees Farooq	Jr
DL	17	Ethan Utley	So
DL	18	Tyree Weathersby	Jr
DL	19	Nathan Robinson	Jr
DB	20	Tevis Metcalf	Jr
DB	21	Jamyan Theodore	Fr
LB	22	Jeremiah Telander	Sr
DB	23	Sidney Walton	So
DB	24	Dylan Lewis	So
DB	25	Timothy Merritt	So
DL	26	JJ Finch	Fr
LB	27	Jadon Perlotte	So
LB	28	Brayden Rouse	Fr
DB	29	Isaiah Hardge	Sr
DB	30	Javonte Smith	Fr
DB	31	Joel Wyatt	Fr
DL	33	Jordan Norman	Sr
DB	34	Zay Anderson	Fr
DL	35	Carson Gentle	So
DL	36	Carter Gooden	Fr
DL	37	Kedric Golston II	Fr
DB	38	Jowell Combay	Fr
DL	39	Darryl Rivers	Fr
DL	40	KJ McClain	Fr
DB	42	DJ Burks	Sr
DB	43	Jackson Mathews	So
DL	44	Christian Gass	So
DL	47	Isaiah Campbell	So
LB	50	Ryan Scott	So
LB	51	TJ White	Fr
DL	55	Mike Bethea	Sr
DL	56	Zach Groves	Fr
LB	57	Grier Short	So
DL	59	Dereon Albert	Fr
DL	85	CJ Edwards	Fr
DL	87	Nuk Simmons	Fr
DL	95	Breeze Carter	Fr
DL	97	Hezekiah Harris	Fr
DL	99	Charles House III	So

Special teams

Pos.	#	Name	Class
PK	28	Cooper Ranvier	Jr
LS	48	Bennett Brady	Sr
LS	53	Blake Howard	Sr
PK	93	Grady Dangerfield	So
P/PK	94	Josh Turbyville	Sr
P	98	Jackson Ross	Sr
P	99	Logan Foley	Fr

Head coach

- Josh Heupel

Coordinators/assistant coaches

- Alec Abeln – Tight ends
- Evan Crabtree – Special teams coordinator
- Glen Elarbee – Offensive line
- Rodney Garner – Defensive line
- Joey Halzle – Offensive coordinator/Quarterbacks
- William Inge – Linebackers
- Andrew Jackson – LEOs
- Derek Jones – Cornerbacks
- Jim Knowles – Defensive coordinator
- Anthony Poindexter – Co-Defensive Coordinator/Secondary
- Kelsey Pope – Pass game coordinator/Wide receivers
- De'Rail Sims – Running backs
- Derek Owings – Director of Football Sports Performance

Legend

- (C) Team captain
- (S) Suspended
- (I) Ineligible
- Injured
- Redshirt

Roster
