= Gilman School =

Boys school in Baltimore, Maryland, US

Coordinates: 39.3603°N 76.6340°W

Location
- 5407 Roland Avenue; Baltimore, Maryland 21210; United States

Information
- Type: Private; Independent; day; college-preparatory school
- Motto: In Tuo Lumine Lumen (Latin: "In Thy light [we see] light")
- Religious affiliation: Nonsectarian
- Established: c. 1897
- Sister school: Bryn Mawr School; Roland Park Country School
- President: Andrew Brooks
- Head of School: Henry Smyth
- Faculty: 167
- Grades: Pre-kindergarten-12
- Gender: Boys
- Enrollment: 1,030
- Campus: Suburban, 57 acres (.23 km^{2})
- Colors: Navy and Gray
- Song: "Gilman, O Gilman"
- Athletics conference: MIAA
- Mascot: Greyhound
- Nickname: Greyhounds
- Rivals: McDonogh School Boys' Latin School of Maryland
- Accreditation: NAIS; AIMS
- Yearbook: Cynosure
- Tuition: PreK-12: $22,435-$39,820 (2025-26)
- Affiliations: AIMSMDDC; International Boy's Schools Coalition; Global Online Academy
- Website: www.gilman.edu

Gilman School is an all-boys independent, day, college preparatory school located in the Roland Park neighborhood of Baltimore, Maryland, United States. There are three school divisions: Lower School, grades pre-kindergarten through four; Middle School, grades five through eight; and Upper School, grades nine through twelve. Founded in 1897 as the Country School for Boys, it was the first country day school in the US. It is named for Daniel Coit Gilman, the first president of Johns Hopkins University and an early supporter of efforts by Anne Galbraith Carey to form an all-boys day school.

Gilman enrolls approximately 1,400 students, ranging from pre-kindergarten to 12th grade, under the instruction of 146 faculty members. It is a member of the Association of Independent Maryland Schools and the Maryland Interscholastic Athletic Association.

== History ==
Gilman was founded as the Country School for Boys by Baltimore resident Anne Galbraith Carey, with assistance from Daniel Coit Gilman (1831–1908), the first president of Johns Hopkins University (1876–1908). The school opened its doors on September 30, 1897, in the old "Homewood" Mansion off North Charles Street. (The mansion, now known as the Homewood Museum, was constructed in 1800 in Georgian-Federal style architecture, for Charles Carroll Jr. (1775–1825), also known as Charles Carroll of Homewood, son of Charles Carroll of Carrollton (1737–1832), last surviving signer of the Declaration of Independence.) By 1910, Johns Hopkins began moving its campus north from its former downtown location along North Howard Street in the neighborhood of Mount Vernon-Belvedere to the newly named Homewood campus. In that year, the Country School moved to its current 68-acre (28 ha) campus further north in the city, in north Roland Park along Roland Avenue, just south of Belvedere Avenue (and the future Northern Parkway). Here was begun one of the first planned suburban developments in America by the new Roland Park Company in 1891. At that time the institution changed its name to "The Gilman Country School for Boys", in honor of the seminal figure in its founding, Dr. Gilman. In 1951, "Country" was dropped from the name.

Gilman has two sister schools: Bryn Mawr School, across Northern Parkway from Gilman to the north, and Roland Park Country School, across Roland Avenue to the west. All three schools coordinate some Upper School (grades 9–12) classes to the extent that some classes have students from all three schools.

== Academics ==
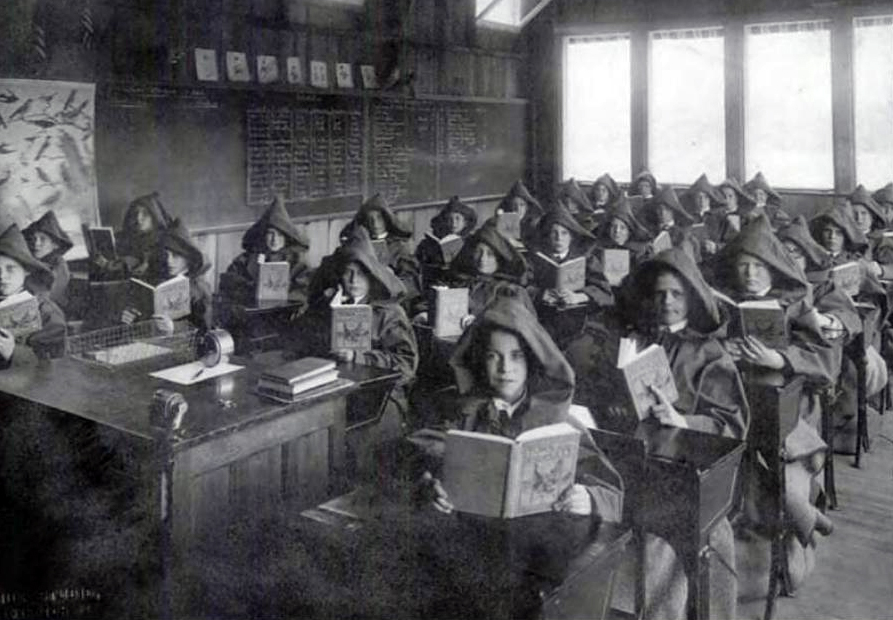
An open-air classroom at Gilman, in use from 1911 to 1922

The school has three divisions: Lower School (pre-kindergarten through grade five), Middle School (grades six through eight) and Upper School (grades nine through twelve).

At the Upper School level, students are required to take courses in history, mathematics, English, science, and a foreign language each semester; an intramural or interscholastic sport each season; and a minimum of art and music instruction over four years. Students must also fulfill a community service requirement and may choose to participate in a range of extracurricular activities. Gilman's Science, technology, engineering, and mathematics (STEM) program was ranked #100 in Niche’s 2027 nationwide survey of US high schools.

A number of courses permit cross-registration by students from two neighboring girls' schools: Bryn Mawr and Roland Park Country School. In turn, Gilman students, primarily seniors, are able to enroll in equivalent courses at these sister schools. Starting junior year, students are allowed to take necessary classes like English and other subjects at the sister schools. The school offers numerous courses, several through the tri-school collaboration. Cross-registration also allows for a variety of languages to be offered, which currently include French, Spanish, Latin, Ancient Greek, Chinese, Russian, and Arabic.

== Athletics ==
Gilman enjoys a tradition of athletic success. Since the year 2000, 12 Gilman varsity teams have won at least one conference championship. Overall, the school sponsors 16 sports; most teams have varsity and junior varsity programs, while some have fresh-soph and/or middle school squads.

Gilman is perhaps best known for its success in swimming, lacrosse and tennis. The football team has won 13 Maryland Interscholastic Athletic Association (MIAA) "A" Conference championships in the last 20 seasons. The 2002 team finished 10–0 and was ranked 14th in the United States by USA Today's Super 25 high school football poll. That team featured the Associated Press's Offensive and Defensive Player of the Year in quarterback Ambrose Wooden and lineman Victor Abiamiri. Both players went on to star at Notre Dame, and Abiamiri played five seasons for the Philadelphia Eagles. The 2005 team was ranked 12th in the nation in USA Today's Super 25 high school football poll.

The lacrosse team was ranked the #1 high school team in the United States by LaxPower at the conclusion of both the 2008 and 2009 seasons. The team has captured 16 MSA & MIAA "A" conference titles. The lacrosse program has produced many stars in college lacrosse.

Former top-50 professional tennis player Steve Krulevitz was the varsity tennis head coach at the school, where he led the team to a 12th-place finish at the high school national championships in Kentucky, and a 16th-place finish at the 2016 National Invitational Boys High School Team Tennis Tournament, in Newport Beach, California. He also led the team to eight consecutive A Conference titles in the Maryland Interscholastic Athletic Association.

During the 2005–06 school year, six Gilman varsity squads (football, golf, ice hockey, squash, tennis & track and field) won conference titles. In 2008–09, the volleyball team won its first MIAA title, while the squash and swimming teams also won conference championships.

Gilman's biggest rival is the McDonogh School, located in suburban Owings Mills. A football game between the two schools has taken place every fall since 1914. Gilman leads this series, 61-41-5, including a win in the 100th game in 2015.

=== Interscholastic programs ===
Fall offerings

- Cross country
- Football
- Soccer
- Volleyball
- Water polo

Winter offerings

- Basketball
- Ice hockey
- Indoor track
- Squash
- Swimming
- Wrestling

Spring offerings

- Baseball
- Golf
- Lacrosse
- Tennis
- Track and field

=== Championship seasons ===
Gilman's varsity athletic teams have won over 120 championships since 1940, including 41 conference titles since the MIAA was formed in 1994. The school currently competes in the association's highest grouping, or "A" conference, in every sport except for ice hockey.

Sport	MSA titles	MIAA conference titles
Baseball	1976, 1990, 1993	1996, 2010, 2021
Basketball	1950, 1953, 1954, 1956, 1957, 1958, 1959, 1965, 1965, 1967, 1968, 1980	2004, 2005, 2012 (*B conference championship)
Cross country	1980	1996, 1997 (split)
Football	1940, 1941, 1966, 1967, 1972, 1973, 1974, 1976 (split), 1986 (split), 1987 (split), 1990 (split)	1994 (split), 1998, 1999, 2000, 2001 (split), 2002, 2004, 2005, 2006 (Split), 2009, 2011, 2012, 2014 (split), 2015
Golf	1974 (split), 1977 (split), 1979, 1987, 1990, 1991	1995, 1998, 2006, 2007, 2008
Ice Hockey		2004, 2006, 2013, 2016, 2019, 2020, 2023
Indoor Track		2011, 2012, 2013, 2015, 2016, 2018, 2019, 2020, 2026
Lacrosse	1947, 1948, 1949, 1950, 1956, 1970 (split), 1973, 1976, 1978, 1981, 1994	1995, 1998, 2000, 2009, 2011
Soccer	1971, 1972	2001 (*B conference), 2010
Squash		2008, 2009, 2010, 2011, 2012, 2013, 2014, 2015, 2016, 2017, 2020, 2022, 2023, 2024, 2025
Swimming	B conference: 1979, 1981, 1984	B conference: 2008, 2009, 2010, 2011
Tennis	1958, 1960, 1961, 1962, 1966, 1967, 1968, 1969, 1976, 1978 (split), 1982 (split), 1983, 1986, 1991	1998, 2000, 2003, 2006, 2007, 2010, 2014, 2015, 2016, 2017, 2018, 2019, 2021, 2022, 2024
Track and field	1978, 1985	1996, 2005, 2009, 2010, 2011, 2012, 2021, 2017, 2018, 2019, 2021
Volleyball		2008, 2013, 2014, 2016, 2017, 2018, 2021, 2024, 2026
Water polo		2000, 2007, 2019, 2020, 2022, 2023, 2025, 2026
Wrestling	1953, 1955, 1957, 1959, 1960, 1961, 1963, 1964, 1965, 1970, 1971, 1972, 1973, 1974, 1984 (split), 1990	2024, 2025

== Awards ==
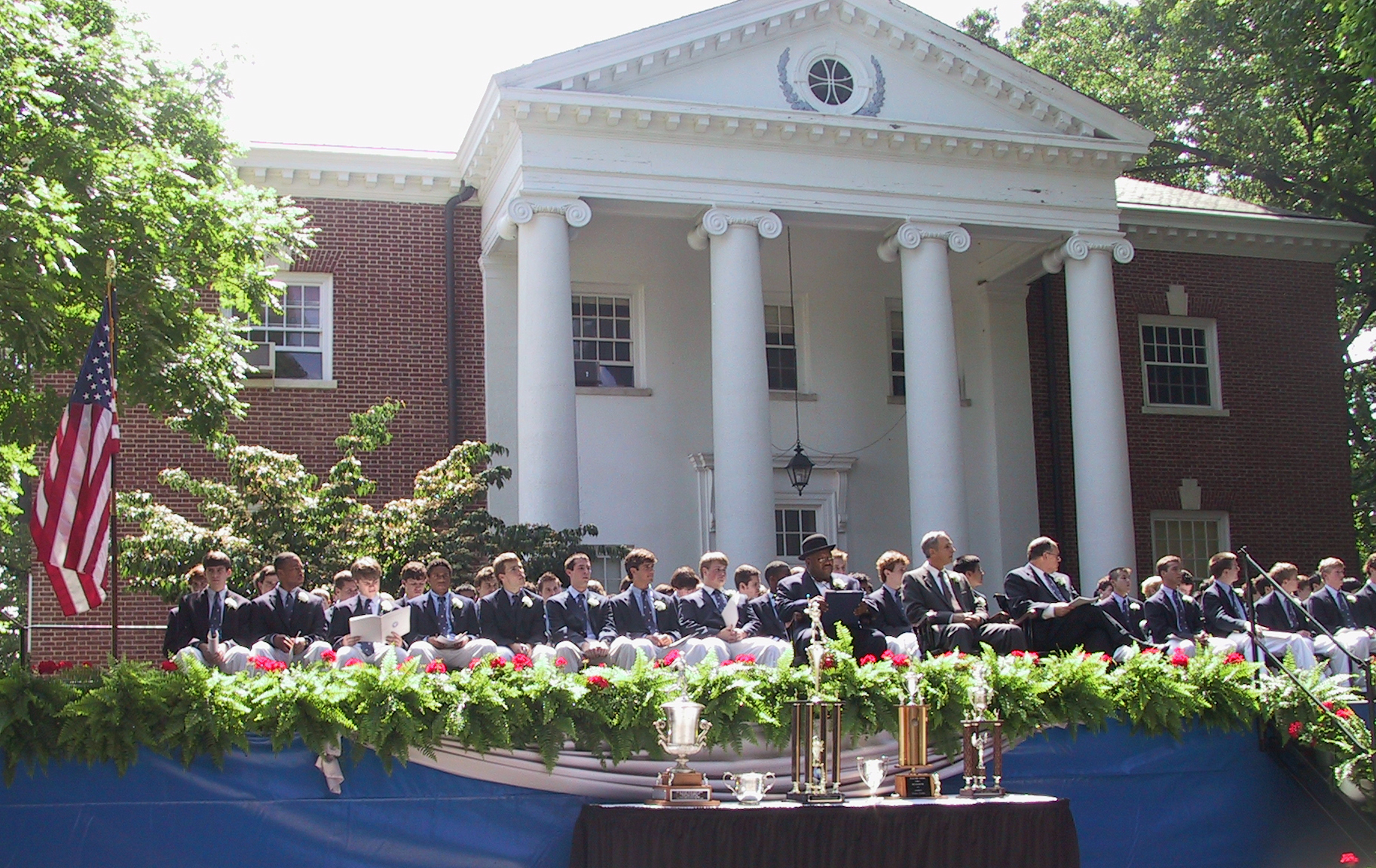
Commencement ceremonies held in front of Gilman's Alumni Old Gym

Gilman confers over 50 awards at the upper school level for achievement in academics, athletics, student leadership, and extracurricular activities. Most prizes are bestowed on seniors; a smaller number are granted to underclassmen by design or as circumstances warrant. The majority are given on Awards Day, held each year in late May, while a handful of the highest honors are withheld until Founders Day, the day of Gilman's commencement ceremonies.

- The William A. Fisher Medallion is accorded to a junior or senior "who has rendered the highest service that can be rendered the School by leadership based on the influence of character."
- The William S. Thomas Scholarship Prize consists of seven awards: six given to the top scholar of grades 8 to 12 and one for the valedictorian, as determined by academic achievement over the course of four years.
- The William Cabell Bruce Jr. Athletic Prize honors the upper school student "most conspicuous for general proficiency in athletic sports and exercises over a two-year period".
- The Daniel Baker Jr. Memorial is awarded to the senior who "through thoughtfulness and by reason of his character, has contributed to the general welfare of his fellow men".
- The Edward Fenimore Award recognizes the senior who has best exemplified the characteristics of "courage, determination, perseverance, and accomplishment".
- The Peter Parrott Blanchard Award is given to the upper school student who "by his cheerful helpfulness ... has greatly contributed to the successful and pleasant life in the School."
- The Redmond C. S. Finney Award celebrates the student who has distinguished himself "through his dedication to and practice of those human values necessary to eliminate racism, prejudice, and intolerance".
- The Daniel C. Ammidon Award recognizes students in grades 6–12 for their "outstanding citizenship and commitment to the Gilman Community."

== Leadership ==
Headmaster	Dates of service
Frederick Winsor	1897–1900
Roland J. Mulford	1900–1903
Samuel W. Kinney	1903–1909
Edwin B. King	1909–1912
Frank W. Pine	1912–1919
L. Wardlaw Miles	1919–1926
E. Boyd Morrow	1926–1943
Henry H. Callard	1943–1963
Ludlow H. Baldwin	1963–1968
Redmond C. S. Finney	1968–1992
Archibald R. Montgomery IV	1992–2001
Jon C. McGill	2001–2007
John E. Schmick	2007–2013
Henry P. A. Smyth	2013–present

President, Board of Trustees	Dates of service
William A. Fisher	1897–1900
Francis M. Jencks	1900–1907
Joseph S. Ames	1907–1912
John M. T. Finney	1912–1942
Charles S. Garland	1943–1949
Edward K. Dunn Sr.	1949–1956
Richard W. Emory	1956–1965
I. Ridgeway Trimble	1965–1969
Owen Daly II	1969–1975
William J. McCarthy	1975–1980
J. Richard Thomas	1980–1985
George E. Thomsen	1985–1990
George B. Hess	1990–1994
James S. Riepe	1994–1998
Stephen T. Scott	1998–2002
Raymond L. Bank	2002–2006
Charles C. Fenwick Jr.	2006–2010
Paul F. McBride	2010–2014
Scott A. Wieler	2014–2018
Mark R. Fetting	2018–2022
Andy M. Brooks	2022–present

== Notable alumni ==
- Victor Abiamiri, defensive end for the Philadelphia Eagles (National Football League)
- John P. Angelos, executive vice president of the Baltimore Orioles
- Thomas Booker, defensive end who played college football at Stanford University and won Super Bowl LIX with the Philadelphia Eagles
- Ryan Boyle, Professional Lacrosse Hall of Fame and National Lacrosse Hall of Fame attackman in the National Lacrosse League and Major League Lacrosse
- Daniel Brewster, U.S. senator from Maryland
- C. Justin Brown, criminal defense attorney representing Adnan Syed, subject of the first season of the podcast Serial
- William P. Carey, philanthropist and businessman, founder of W. P. Carey & Co.
- Brandon Copeland, linebacker for the Atlanta Falcons, played college football for the University of Pennsylvania
- Reed Cordish, real estate developer and Assistant to the President in the Trump administration (2017–2019)
- Frank Deford, author, commentator for National Public Radio, and senior contributing writer for Sports Illustrated
- Bob Ehrlich, former Governor of Maryland and former U.S. Representative from Maryland's 2nd congressional district
- Brian Ferentz, assistant coach for the New England Patriots and former offensive lineman for the Atlanta Falcons
- Kent Flannery, archaeologist at the University of Michigan known for research on the origins of agriculture in Mesoamerica
- A. B. Griswold (Class of 1924), art historian and collector specializing in Thai art; adjunct professor at Cornell University and donor of the Walters Art Museum's Thai art collection
- Fritz Haller and Lecky Haller, world champions and olympians in whitewater canoe
- Hall Hammond, chief judge of the Maryland Court of Appeals
- Kasim Hill, college football player for the Rhode Island Rams
- Darius Jennings, NFL wide receiver and return specialist
- Cyrus Jones, cornerback who played college football for the University of Alabama
- Kevin B. Kamenetz, Baltimore County executive
- Ensign C. Markland Kelly Jr., war hero and lacrosse player
- David Kim, founder of C2 Education
- Bradley King (Class of 2002), theatrical lighting designer; won the Tony Award for Best Lighting Design in a Musical for Natasha, Pierre & The Great Comet of 1812 (2017) and Hadestown (2019)
- Micah Kiser, inside linebacker for the LA Rams and 2017 William V. Campbell Trophy recipient
- Dejuan Lane, college football safety for the Tennessee Volunteers
- Rayuan Lane III, NFL safety for the Jacksonville Jaguars
- Benson Everett Legg, chief judge of the United States District Court for the District of Maryland
- Kai Locksley, quarterback and wide receiver for the Hamilton Tiger-Cats
- Alex London, children's and young adult author
- Walter Lord, author of A Night to Remember
- Luigi Mangione (Class of 2016, valedictorian), suspect in the killing of UnitedHealthCare CEO Brian Thompson
- J. William Middendorf, United States Secretary of the Navy (1974–1977) and U.S. Ambassador to the Netherlands (1969–1973)
- Christopher Minkowski, Boden Professor of Sanskrit at the University of Oxford
- Ambler H. Moss, U.S. Ambassador to Panama (1978–1982), during ratification of the Panama Canal Treaties
- John W. Nicholson Jr., former commander of NATO's Allied Land Command and U.S. forces in Afghanistan
- Paul Offit (Class of 1969), Chief of the Division of Infectious Diseases at the Perelman School of Medicine at the University of Pennsylvania (1992–2014) and member of the FDA Vaccines and Related Biological Products Advisory Committee (2017–2025)
- Timothy Parker, crossword editor of USA Today and Guinness World Record holder for syndicated puzzles
- Colin Pine, former interpreter to Yao Ming of the Houston Rockets (National Basketball Association)
- Greg Plitt, actor, fitness model, and former U.S. Army Ranger
- Biff Poggi, investment manager and football coach
- Nicholas Pryor, actor known for roles in Risky Business and Beverly Hills, 90210
- Marcus J. Ranum, computer security researcher credited with foundational work on firewall technology
- William S. Reese, antiquarian rare book dealer and former president of the Antiquarian Booksellers' Association of America
- Christopher Rouse, composer
- Malcolm Ruff, Maryland attorney and member of the Maryland General Assembly
- John Sarbanes, U.S. Representative from Maryland's 3rd congressional district
- Mark Schuster, dean and founding CEO of the Kaiser Permanente Bernard J. Tyson School of Medicine
- Jeff Seibert, co-founder and CEO of Crashlytics (acquired by Twitter) and former senior director of product at Twitter
- Gavin Sheets, professional baseball player
- Mark Shapiro, president and CEO of the Toronto Blue Jays
- Stuart O. Simms, former Maryland Secretary of Public Safety and Correctional Services
- Fife Symington, former Governor of Arizona
- Jon Theodore, former drummer for The Mars Volta
- Christopher Van Hollen Sr., U.S. Ambassador to Sri Lanka and the Maldives (1972–1976)
