= Faizon Brandon =

American football player (born 2008)

No. 11 – Tennessee Volunteers
- Position: Quarterback
- Class: Freshman

Personal information
- Born: June 1, 2008 (age 18); Greensboro, North Carolina, U.S.
- Listed height: 6 ft 4 in (1.93 m)
- Listed weight: 225 lb (102 kg)

Career information
- High school: Grimsley (Greensboro, North Carolina)
- College: Tennessee (2026–present)
- Stats at ESPN

Faizon Brandon (born June 1, 2008) is an American college football quarterback for the Tennessee Volunteers.

== Early life ==
Brandon was born on June 1, 2008 in Greensboro, North Carolina. He attended Grimsley High School in Greensboro. As a freshman in 2022, he completed 32 of 44 passes for 534 yards with eight touchdowns and four interceptions. As a sophomore in 2023, he completed 191 of 277 passes for 3,026 yards, 36 touchdowns and three interceptions and rushed for 528 yards with nine touchdowns. As a junior in 2024, Brandon passed for 2,814 yards with 35 touchdowns and two interceptions and led his team to a state title championship. He was named the North Carolina Gatorade Football Player of the Year and North Carolina Mr. Football.

A five-star recruit, Brandon was the consensus top quarterback and one of the top overall recruits in the class of 2026. He committed to the University of Tennessee to play college football.

== College career ==
Brandon entered his true freshman season competing with George MacIntyre and Ryan Staub for the starting quarterback position. Head coach Josh Heupel named Brandon the starter for the 2026 season opener against Furman. In his collegiate debut, Brandon became the youngest starting quarterback in Tennessee history and completed 13 of 17 passes for 226 yards and three touchdowns while rushing for 68 yards and two touchdowns in the 56–9 victory. His five total touchdowns tied the Tennessee freshman record previously held by Casey Clausen and Tyler Bray. He was named SEC and Shaun Alexander Freshman Player of the Week.

=== Statistics ===
Year	Team	Games			Passing								Rushing			
Year	Team	GP	GS	Record	Cmp	Att	Pct	Yds	Y/A	TD	Int	Rtg	Att	Yds	Avg	TD
2026	Tennessee	6	5	4–1	62	102	60.8	721	7.1	8	1	144.3	54	159	2.9	3
Career		6	5	4–1	62	102	60.8	721	7.1	8	1	144.3	54	159	2.9	3
