= Bernard Tyson =

American health executive (1959–2019)

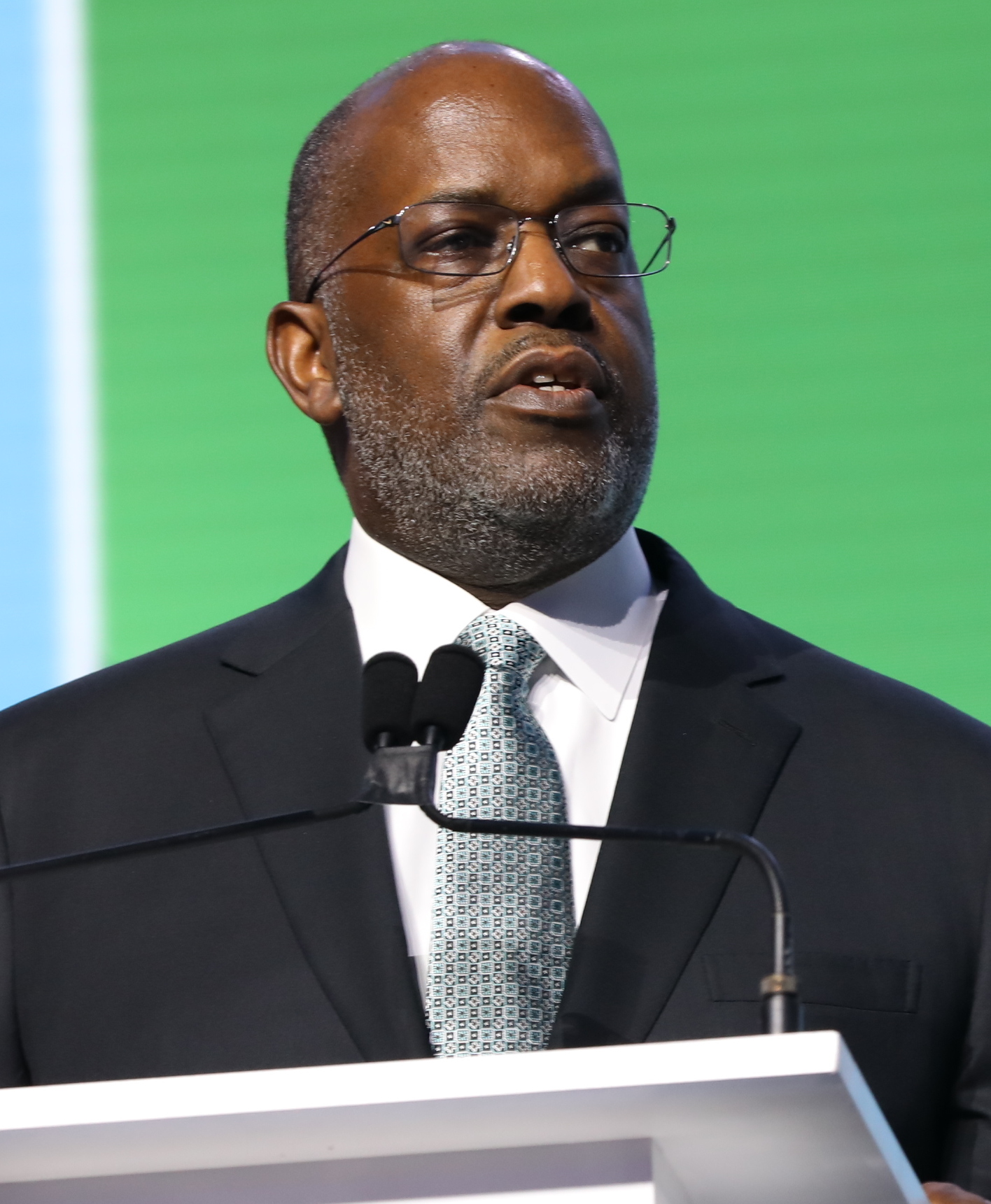
- Tyson speaking at the Global Climate Action Summit in 2018
- Born: January 20, 1959; Vallejo, California, U.S.
- Died: November 10, 2019 (aged 60); Oakland, California, U.S.
- Education: Golden Gate University (BA, MBA)
- Occupation: Healthcare executive
- Employer: Kaiser Permanente
- Title: Chief executive officer
- Term: 2012–2019

Bernard J. Tyson (January 20, 1959 – November 10, 2019) was an American health executive. He was the CEO of integrated managed care consortium Kaiser Permanente, the largest such organization in the United States, which provides health care to 12 million people.

== Early life and education ==
Born in Vallejo, California and a native of the San Francisco Bay Area, Tyson received a bachelor's degree in health service management and an MBA degree in health service administration from Golden Gate University.

== Career ==
Tyson was previously president and chief operating officer of the company for two years. His promotion was announced November 5, 2012, and he was the first African American to hold the position. Tyson worked at Kaiser for over 34 years.

== Board memberships and awards ==
He was named the third most influential person in health care by Modern Healthcare in 2015, and the second-most influential person in health care in 2014.

Tyson was included on the 2017 Time 100 Most Influential People list as a leading authority on public health in America. Tyson was also selected among Time magazine's 50 Most Influential People in Health Care for 2018.

He served on the board of the American Heart Association, which created in his honor the "Bernard J. Tyson Impact Fund." The fund's mission addresses solutions to health care inequity. Tyson's widow, Denise Bradley-Tyson, leads the program and significant donors include Kaiser Permanente, Jeff Bezos and Lynne and Marc Benioff.

== Death ==
Tyson died in Oakland, California, on November 10, 2019, at the age of 60.

== Legacy ==
At Bernard Tyson's memorial service in San Francisco on November 18 at the Chase Center, it was announced that Kaiser's new medical school in Pasadena will be named the Kaiser Permanente Bernard J. Tyson School of Medicine.
