= Rayuan Lane III =

American football player (born 2003)

Rayuan Lane
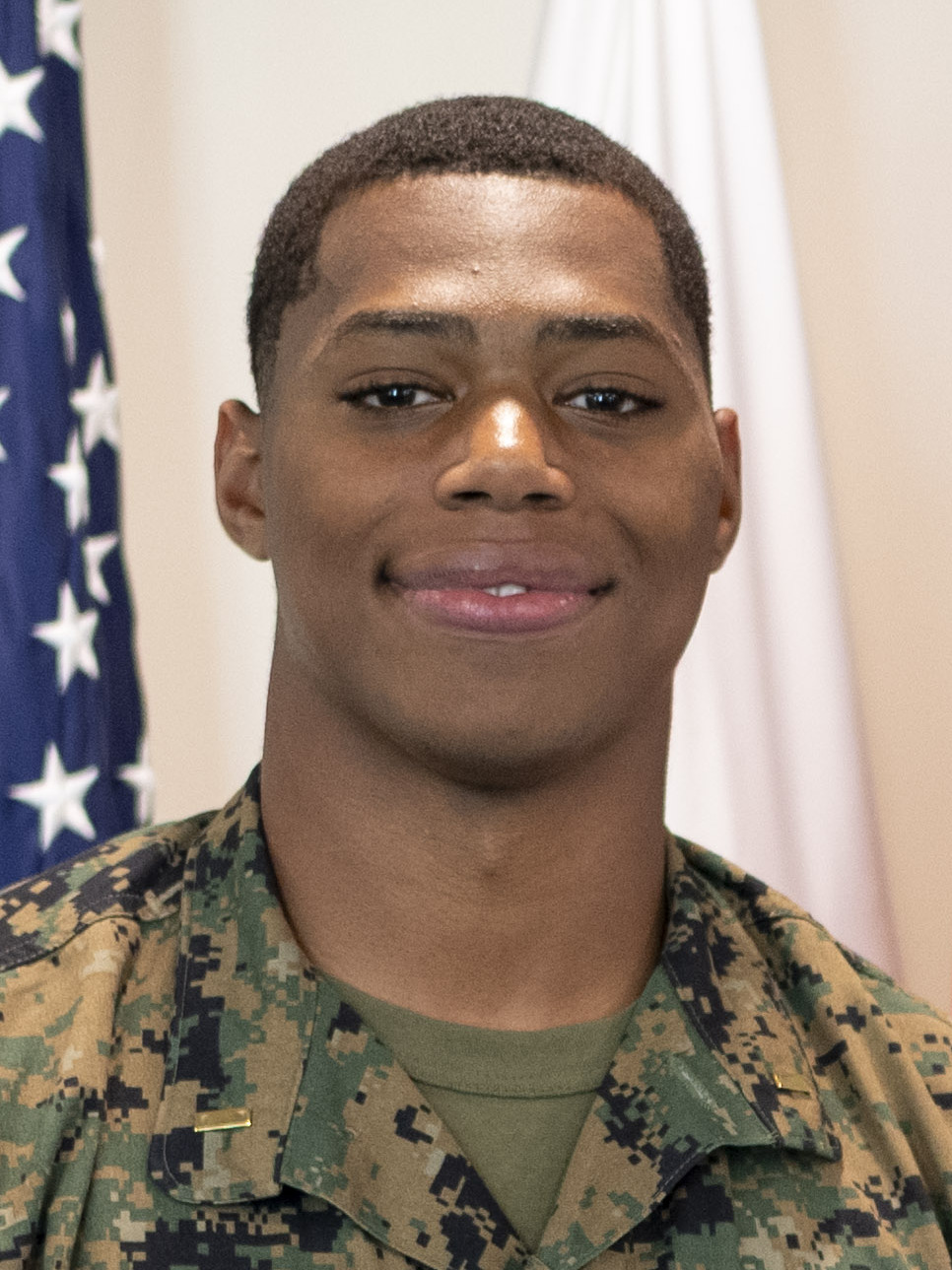
- Lane in 2025

No. 25 – Jacksonville Jaguars
- Position: Safety
- Roster status: Active

Personal information
- Born: July 21, 2003 (age 23); Jessup, Maryland, U.S.
- Listed height: 5 ft 11 in (1.80 m)
- Listed weight: 197 lb (89 kg)

Career information
- High school: Gilman School (Baltimore, Maryland)
- College: Navy (2021–2024)
- NFL draft: 2025: 6th round, 200th overall pick

Career history
- Jacksonville Jaguars (2025–present)

Awards and highlights
- First-team All-AAC (2024); Third-team All-AAC (2023)

Career NFL statistics as of Week 10, 2026
- Total tackles: 47
- Fumble recoveries: 1
- Pass deflections: 5
- Interceptions: 1
- Defensive touchdowns: 1
- Stats at Pro Football Reference

Rayuan Lane III (born July 21, 2003) is an American professional football safety for the Jacksonville Jaguars of the National Football League (NFL). He played college football for the Navy Midshipmen.

== Early life ==
Lane grew up in Ellicott City, Maryland and later attended Gilman School in Baltimore, Maryland, and committed to play college football for the Navy Midshipmen.

== College career ==
As a freshman in 2021, Lane appeared in 12 games where he made seven starts, notching 37 tackles with two being for a loss, four pass deflections, an interception, and a forced fumble. In 2022, he tallied 71 tackles with three being for a loss, four pass deflections, two fumble recoveries, and two forced fumbles. During the 2023 season, Lane totaled 66 tackles with three being for a loss, eight pass deflections, four interceptions, a fumbles recovery, two forced fumbles, and a touchdown. In week 4 of the 2024 season, he returned an interception 86 yards for a touchdown versus Memphis. Lane finished his final collegiate season notching 70 tackles with one going for a loss, four pass deflections, two interceptions, three forced fumbles and a touchdown, and accepted an invite to play in the 2025 Reese's Senior Bowl.

== Professional career ==
Pre-draft measurables
Height	Weight	Arm length	Hand span	Wingspan	40-yard dash	10-yard split	20-yard split	20-yard shuttle	Three-cone drill	Vertical jump	Broad jump
5 ft 10 7/8 in (1.80 m)	200 lb (91 kg)	30 1/4 in (0.77 m)	9 3/4 in (0.25 m)	6 ft 2 5/8 in (1.90 m)	4.57 s	1.56 s	2.71 s	4.28 s	7.10 s	37.0 in (0.94 m)	10 ft 8 in (3.25 m)
All values from NFL Combine

Lane was selected 200th overall in the sixth round of the 2025 NFL draft by the Jacksonville Jaguars.

In Week 8 of the 2026 NFL season against the Indianapolis Colts, Lane posted a 92-yard pick-six, four tackles and three pass breakups in only his second career start, earning AFC Defensive Player of the Week for his efforts.

== Personal life ==
Lane's brother, Dejuan Lane, is also a safety and plays for the Tennessee Volunteers.
