= Mark Schuster =

American physician

Mark A. Schuster

Dean of Population Health Sciences and David Cohen Professor of Primary Health Care and Population Health, University College London
- Incumbent
- Assumed office 2026

Personal details
- Born: Baltimore, Maryland
- Education: Yale University

Mark Schuster is Dean of Population Health Sciences and David Cohen Professor of Primary Health Care and Population Health at University College London (UCL). Before joining UCL, he was Founding Dean and CEO of the Kaiser Permanente Bernard J. Tyson School of Medicine in Pasadena, California. Schuster is a physician-scientist known for his work on health and health policy.

== Education ==
Schuster was born in Baltimore, Maryland and attended the Gilman School. He studied history at Yale University, receiving his B.A. summa cum laude in 1981. In 1988, Schuster obtained his MD and MPP degrees from Harvard Medical School and the Harvard Kennedy School of Government. His master's thesis addressed HIV among injection drug users in Boston. His thesis advisors were Thomas Schelling and Mark Schlesinger. Schuster completed his residency in pediatrics at Boston Children's Hospital before beginning his PhD at the Pardee RAND Graduate School while a Robert Wood Johnson Clinical Scholar at UCLA. Schuster's PhD dissertation studied adolescent sexuality and risk prevention and was presented in 1994. His dissertation committee included Robert Bell, Robert Brook, Phyllis Ellickson, and David Kanouse (Chair).

== Career ==
Schuster has co-authored over 250 journal articles and two books: Everything You Never Wanted Your Kids to Know About Sex (but Were Afraid They’d Ask): The Secrets to Surviving Your Child’s Sexual Development from Birth to the Teens and Child Rearing in America: Challenges Facing Parents of Young Children. With over $50 million in funding from NIH, AHRQ, and CDC, he has conducted research on topics such as quality of care, health disparities, family leave, LGBTQ+ health, obesity prevention, adolescent sexual health, and bullying.

From 1995 – 2007, Schuster was a faculty member at UCLA and reached the level of professor of pediatrics and of health services at the UCLA Schools of Medicine and Public Health. While there, he was also a Senior Natural Scientist at RAND, where he founded and led the UCLA/RAND Health Promotion and Disease Prevention research center and held the RAND Distinguished Chair in Health Promotion. From 2007 – 2017, Schuster served as the William Berenberg Professor of Pediatrics at Harvard Medical School and as the Chief of General Pediatrics and Vice Chair for Health Policy in the Department of Medicine at Boston Children's Hospital. Schuster was the founding director of the Center of Excellence for Pediatric Quality Measurement at Boston Children's Hospital, funded by AHRQ and CMS. Schuster joined Kaiser Permanente Bernard J. Tyson School of Medicine in 2017 as Founding Dean, CEO, and Professor of Health Systems Science and led the development of a new school that uses many of the most innovative and effective educational practices available today to provide future physicians with the knowledge and skills needed to help transform healthcare and help people from all backgrounds and settings thrive. Schuster became Founding Dean and CEO Emeritus in 2024 and Professor of Health Systems Science Emeritus in 2026. He is also Senior Scholar at the Stanford Clinical Excellence Research Center.

In 2026, Schuster was appointed as the Dean of Population Health Sciences and David Cohen Professor of Primary Health Care and Population Health at University College London, where he oversees the Institute of Cardiovascular Science, Great Ormond Street Institute of Child Health, Institute of Clinical Trials and Methodology, Institute of Epidemiology and Health Care, Global Business School for Health, Institute for Global Health, Institute of Health Informatics, and Elizabeth Garrett Anderson Institute for Women’s Health.

Schuster is an active voice in research and advocacy on LGBTQ+ health and LGBTQ+ representation in medicine. His published speech, On Being Gay in Medicine, has been widely circulated and used as a teaching tool. In 2020, a ten-year retrospective on the piece was published in WBUR's CommonHealth Blog.

== Honors ==
- Elected member of the National Academy of Medicine (NAM) and member of the NAM Council (governing body)
- Recipient of the Joseph W. St. Geme, Jr. Leadership Award from the Federation of Pediatric Organizations
- Former President of the Academic Pediatric Association
- Recipient of the Richardson Award for Lifetime Achievement from the Society for Pediatric Research
- Recipient of the Child Health Services Research Lifetime Achievement Award from AcademyHealth
- Dr. Mark A. Schuster Pillar Award was created and named in his honor, given annually as the highest award at the school to a student, faculty member, and staff member for service to the Kaiser Permanente Bernard J. Tyson School of Medicine
- Recipient of the Barger Excellence in Mentoring Award from Harvard Medical School
- Named among Modern Healthcare's 100 Most Influential People in Healthcare in 2018 and 2019
- Named among Modern Healthcare's 50 Most Influential Clinical Executives in 2019
