= Jesse Perry =

American football player

No. 72 – Tennessee Volunteers
- Position: Offensive tackle
- Class: Redshirt Sophomore

Personal information
- Listed height: 6 ft 6 in (1.98 m)
- Listed weight: 320 lb (145 kg)

Career information
- High school: Middle Tennessee Christian (Murfreesboro, Tennessee)
- College: Tennessee (2024–present)
- Stats at ESPN

Jesse Nathaniel Perry is an American college football offensive tackle for the Tennessee Volunteers.

== Early life ==
Perry began playing flag football at age four. He transitioned to tackle football soon afterwards.

Perry attended Middle Tennessee Christian School (MTCS) in Murfreesboro, Tennessee, from kindergarten through high school, where he was a four-year starter on the Cougars football team. He played both as an offensive lineman and defensive lineman. Perry was a two-time Division II-A all-state selection on offense by the Tennessee Sports Writers Association. As a senior, he was named the Division II-A East Region Offensive Line MVP while recording 43 tackles and four tackles for loss on defense. He helped MTCS win the Division II-A state championship.

Perry was a consensus three-star recruit. He was ranked as the 55th- and 79th-best offensive tackle in the class of 2024 by 247Sports and Rivals.com, respectively. Perry received over 25 offers from NCAA Division I programs, including Missouri, Mississippi State, Ole Miss, and Vanderbilt. In February 2023, he received an offer from the in-state Tennessee Volunteers. On April 7, 2023, Perry committed to playing college football at Tennessee, saying: "I've been a fan my whole life". He signed with the Volunteers during the early signing period in December.

== College career ==
Perry enrolled early at Tennessee in January 2024, though he joined the Volunteers the previous month for practices ahead of the Citrus Bowl. As a freshman in 2024, he appeared in four games and took a redshirt.

Perry entered fall camp in 2025 listed at 320 lb (150 kg), having arrived on campus at 270 lb (120 kg) the previous year. He had strong performances that offseason and challenged for a starting job at right guard. Due to an injury to star freshman David Sanders Jr., Perry was instead named the starting right tackle for Tennessee's 2025 season opener against Syracuse. He was informed of the move earlier that morning; he made his first career start in the 45–26 victory. The following week, Perry received a 92.2 grade from Pro Football Focus (PFF) for his performance versus East Tennessee State – the highest offensive tackle rating in the country among Power Four teams. After starting the first seven games at right tackle, he was shifted inside to right guard due to Sanders's return from injury. Perry was named the Southeastern Conference (SEC) Co-Offensive Lineman of the Week in late November after a dominant performance in a 31–11 win over Florida. He made 12 starts – seven at right tackle and five at right guard – in 13 games played, earning second-team freshman All-American honors from The Athletic.

Perry entered the 2026 season as Tennessee's starting right tackle.
