= Gregory A. Adams =

American business executive (born 1958)

Greg A. Adams
- Born: Gregory A. Adams; 1958 (age 67–68); Carrolton, Georgia, U.S.
- Education: Oglethorpe University (BA); Wichita State University
- Occupations: Chairman and CEO, Kaiser Permanente

Greg A. Adams is chairman and CEO of Kaiser Foundation Health Plan, Inc. and Hospitals Kaiser Permanente, one of the largest integrated health systems in North America. He was named to the TIME100 Health list by Time magazine as one of the most influential people in healthcare.

== Early life and education ==
Adams was raised in Carrollton, Georgia, a small town outside of Atlanta. At the age of 15, he graduated from Villa Rica High School in 1973.

Adams graduated from nursing school at the age of 18. His first job was working as an emergency room nurse at Crawford Long Memorial Hospital (today Emory Midtown, Atlanta). Later, while living in the Brookhaven section of Atlanta, he discovered Oglethorpe University. He earned a bachelor's degree in biology from Oglethorpe in 1979, and received a master's degree in nursing administration from Wichita State University.

== Career ==
At age 31, Adams became CEO of his first hospital.

In 1999, Adams began his career at Kaiser Permanente as a senior vice president based in Los Angeles, California. In April 2008, Adams was named regional president for Northern California.

In July 2013, he was promoted to executive vice president. In 2016, he added group president to his title and was responsible for overseeing all eight Kaiser Permanente Regions, 39 hospitals, and 701 medical office facilities.

In 2019, Adams was named chair and chief executive officer of Kaiser Permanente.

In 2025, he ranked #2 on Modern Healthcare's most influential people in health care.

== Civic involvement ==
Adams serves on several charitable and industry boards of directors. He is a director for America's Health Insurance Plans; chair of the Health and Retirement Committee of the Business Roundtable; a governor and steward within the Global Health and Healthcare Community at the World Economic Forum; a member of the National Association of Health Services Executives and The Executive Leadership Council; a director for the Los Angeles Philharmonic Association; and a past member of the California Chamber of Commerce board of directors and the California Hospital Association's board of trustees.

In 2026, Adams was elected to the American Academy of Arts and Sciences.

== See also ==
- Kaiser Permanente
