= Kaiser Permanente Bernard J. Tyson School of Medicine =

Medical school in California, USA

Coordinates: 34.14415°N 118.14103°W

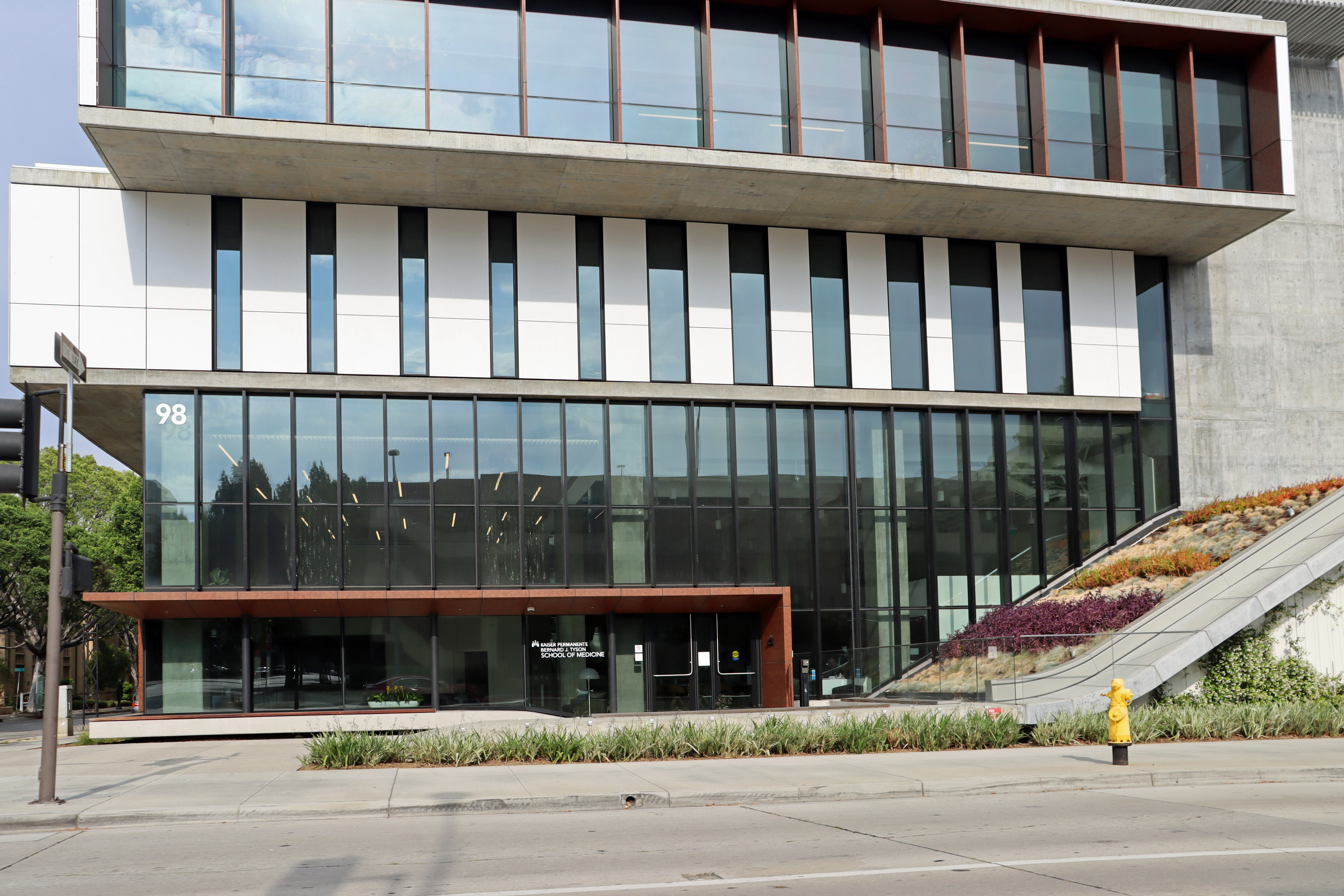
- Type: Allopathic private medical school
- Established: 2020
- Parent institution: Kaiser Permanente
- Dean: John L. Dalrymple, MD
- Location: Pasadena, California, United States
- Campus: Suburban
- Website: medschool.kp.org

The Kaiser Permanente Bernard J. Tyson School of Medicine is a medical school associated with the Kaiser Permanente health system and located in Pasadena, California. The school matriculated its inaugural class of 50 students in July 2020. In November 2019, the school was renamed in honor of late Kaiser Permanente Chairman and CEO Bernard J. Tyson.

Kaiser Permanente created the school to train “future physicians in 21st century medicine.” The school is using modern educational techniques and integrates the three disciplines of clinical, biomedical, and health system science. The school also emphasizes equity, inclusion, and diversity; service-learning; health promotion; student well-being; advocacy and leadership; interprofessional collaboration; and global health in its curricular experiences.

== History ==
Kaiser Permanente announced its plan to start a medical school in December 2015. Kaiser Permanente's vision for the school is to redesign physician education around the themes of patient-centered care, population health, quality improvement, team-based care, and health equity. Kaiser Permanente has long been involved in graduate medical education: Kaiser Permanente's first independent residency program began in 1944, and it currently trains over 600 residents each year.

In 2017, Mark Schuster was named the medical school's founding dean and CEO. With funding from NIH, CDC, and AHRQ, he has studied topics such as quality of care, health disparities, family leave, sexual and gender minority health, obesity prevention, and adolescent sexual health. Schuster previously served as the William Berenberg Professor of Pediatrics at Harvard Medical School and chief of general pediatrics and vice chair for health policy in the Department of Medicine at Boston Children's Hospital.

The school received preliminary accreditation from the Liaison Committee on Medical Education (LCME) in February 2019 and received full LCME accreditation in June 2024. The school received candidacy from WASC Senior College and University Commission (WSCUC) in July 2021. The school will waive all tuition and fees for the full four years of medical school for its first six classes.

=== Renaming ===
The Kaiser Permanente Bernard J. Tyson School of Medicine was renamed from the Kaiser Permanente School of Medicine in November 2019 in honor of late Kaiser Permanente Chairman and CEO Bernard J. Tyson. The decision, made by the school's board of directors, was announced at Tyson's memorial service in San Francisco. Tyson drove Kaiser Permanente to increase its investment in addressing the social factors that influence health, including supporting affordable housing, food security, clean air, safe recreational space, and the reduction of gun violence.

== Admissions ==
The school admitted 50 students in its inaugural class for the 2020–21 academic year, and another 50 students in its second class beginning in the 2021–22 academic year. It has one of the highest ratios of applications to available spots among all U.S. medical schools, with the resulting percentage of 0.5 percent for the 2021–22 admission cycle, the lowest in the US. The average student age is 24. A significant percentage of students are from groups underrepresented in medicine (36 percent for the class entering in 2020–21; 40 percent for 2021–22). Applications are accepted from U.S. citizens, permanent residents of the U.S. (green card holders), and Deferred Action for Childhood Arrivals (DACA) recipients. A bachelor's degree from an accredited college or university in the U.S. or Canada is required. The school uses a holistic review process.

== Facilities ==
The Kaiser Permanente Bernard J. Tyson School of Medicine's main campus is in Pasadena, California, a city within Los Angeles County. The location is three blocks south from the regional offices at the corner of Los Robles Avenue and Green Street. The school occupies a four-story building designed to support student wellness and the school's collaborative curriculum. The building was designed by the Yazdani Studio of CannonDesign.

The school houses supportive and administrative functions in two adjacent buildings to the Medical Education Building.

Clinical training primarily takes place at seven Kaiser Permanente medical centers in the greater Los Angeles area:

- Downey Medical Center
- San Bernardino County Medical Center
- Los Angeles Medical Center
- Panorama City Medical Center
- South Bay Medical Center
- West Los Angeles Medical Center
- Orange County Medical Center

In their third and fourth years, students have the opportunity to learn at clinical sites in other parts of California and other regions across the country. Additionally, there are service-learning curricula at federally qualified health centers near each clinical site.

== Curriculum ==
The school provides a small group, case-based curriculum with a spiral progression. Coursework integrates biomedical, clinical, and health systems sciences. Students begin clinical immersion experiences in their first year.

=== Longitudinal Integrated Clerkships ===
The Longitudinal Integrated Clerkship (LIC) model restructures the student's and patient's experience of caregiving in five core clerkship specialties (Family Medicine/Internal Medicine, Obstetrics and Gynecology, Pediatrics, Psychiatry, and Surgery) by eliminating traditional block rotations. Instead, students follow panels of patients over time and maintain a longitudinal relationship with their preceptor. [17] Students will round out their early clinical learning with shifts in Emergency Medicine in their second year of study.

In their first two years, students complete a LIC at one of the six Kaiser Permanente medical centers in greater Los Angeles.

=== Student well-being ===
The medical school plans to emphasize student wellness and is providing academic support, coaching, fitness spaces and equipment, health coverage, mentoring, and personal counseling to all students. In addition to those resources, students will be required to take a course that covers personal and professional development. In this course, students will meet regularly with an assigned physician-coach and engage in self-reflection and goal setting to explore their developing professional identity as a future physician.

=== Service-learning ===
Students work in federally qualified health centers to augment classroom learning in the first two years of the curriculum.

=== Anatomy without cadavers ===
The school teaches anatomy without cadavers. Instead, students use tools such as pre-dissected human cadavers preserved by plastination, augmented and virtual reality systems, and diagnostic imaging modalities.

=== Scholarly project ===
Students also complete an independent scholarly project within their first three years at the school. Students can choose what type of project to pursue based on their interests. Example options include biomedical science research, a community-partnered project, health services research, medical education research, and a quality improvement project. An optional advanced scholarly project is available as well.

== Departments ==
The school has three academic departments: biomedical science, clinical science, and health systems science. The departments' highest priority is education, and they also conduct research.

=== Biomedical Science ===
The Department of Biomedical Science teaches students the biological knowledge that underlies the development of clinical reasoning and decision making.

=== Clinical Science ===
The Department of Clinical Science teaches the foundational skills physicians need to deliver care within a healthcare system. Clinical science includes preventing, diagnosing, and treating health conditions and disease and optimizing health for each patient.

=== Health Systems Science ===
The Department of Health Systems Science (HSS), defined by the school as the science of how human relationships, operating in social networks, produce health, teaches students about systemic factors within and beyond clinical care that affect health. It covers the domains of quality and safety, healthcare and social systems, community and population health, inquiry, health information technology, and ethics.
