= Middle Tennessee Christian School =

Middle Texas Christian School

Location
- 100 East MTCS Road; Murfreesboro, Tennessee 37129; United States; 35.8692°N 86.3840°W

Information
- Religious affiliation: Church of Christ
- Established: December 9, 1960; 65 years ago (Chartered)
- Teaching staff: 50
- Employees: 37 additional
- Grades: PreK-12
- Enrollment: PreK: 113; Elementary: 315; Junior High: 103; High School: 190; Total: 721
- Average class size: PreK-6th: 19; 7th-12th: 18
- Language: English
- Hours in school day: 7:45am-3:00pm (Secondary); 7:45am-2:55pm (Elementary)
- Campus size: 38 acres (15 ha)
- Colors: Orange and White
- Mascot: Cougars
- Accreditation: Southern Association of Colleges and Schools
- Communities served: Murfreesboro, Smyrna, Woodberry and Nashville
- Affiliations: Independent Schools of the Nashville Area; National Christian School Association; Tennessee Secondary School Athletic Association
- Website: Middle Tennessee Christian School

Middle Tennessee Christian School (MTCS) is a private Christian school in Murfreesboro, Tennessee, United States, chartered on December 9, 1960. Individuals from a number of congregations of the Churches of Christ in Murfreesboro were responsible for establishing the school. The school's main campus is located at 100 East MTCS Road, 37129. The school provides classes for pre-kindergarten through 12th grade. The school mascot is the cougar, and the team colors are orange, white, and black.

== History ==
Middle Tennessee Christian School was organized in 1960 and received its charter from the State of Tennessee on December 9, 1960. The purpose given in the charter was: "The building and maintenance of a school and or schools to provide educational opportunities . . . particularly the teaching of the Bible; to provide a minimum of one class period per day of instruction in the Bible as the inspired Word of God for every child enrolled and to emphasize the Bible in every course taught; to provide for Christian influence and environment in every phase of the school's activities."

A 25-acre campus was purchased on Lebanon Road near the airport. After incorporation, modern brick buildings were constructed. The first students were accepted in the fall of 1962. MTCS operated as an elementary school with kindergarten through eighth grade until 1975.

At that time the Board of Directors made the decision to add one grade a year until a high school was complete. The first senior class graduated in May 1979. An eight classroom addition was constructed for the high school in 1978. Ten more classrooms and the high school offices were added in 1995. Thirteen acres at the north end of MTCS Road were acquired in 1999 for the development of baseball and soccer fields. The Charlene Waldron Library was built and dedicated in 2001. A building located at 204 MTCS Road was purchased in 2004 for the preschool program. In 2008 a new state of the art gymnasium was built. MTCS was approved at its inception by the Tennessee State Department of Education. In December 1978, we received full accreditation by the Southern Association of Colleges and Schools. Legal ownership of MTCS is vested in a self-perpetuating Board of Trustees composed of persons who are members of Churches of Christ.

Construction began June 2022 on a new high school building. The new addition expects to add 22 classrooms to accommodate more than 300 additional high school students.

== Academics ==
Up until 1975 MTCS offered Kindergarten through eighth grade classes, when the decision was made by the Board of Directors to add one grade a year until a complete high school was available, with the first class graduating in May 1979. In December 1978, MTCS received full accreditation by the Southern Association of Colleges and Schools.

== Notable alumni ==
- Jesse Perry, American football player
