= Dejuan Lane =

American football player

No. 10 – Tennessee Volunteers
- Position: Safety
- Class: Junior

Personal information
- Listed height: 6 ft 2 in (1.88 m)
- Listed weight: 215 lb (98 kg)

Career information
- High school: Gilman School (Baltimore)
- College: Penn State (2024–2025); Tennessee (2026–present)
- Stats at ESPN

Dejuan Keyuance Ray Lane is an American college football safety for the Tennessee Volunteers. He previously played for the Penn State Nittany Lions.

== Early life ==
Lane attended the Gilman School in Baltimore, Maryland. He played football, basketball and ran track in high school. He was MIAA All-Conference in football as a sophomore, junior and senior. In track, he helped set a school record in the 4 × 100 metres relay. Lane committed to Penn State University to play college football.

== College career ==
Lane played in all 16 games his freshman season at Penn State in 2024, recording 15 tackles and one interception. As a sophomore in 2025, he started three of 13 games and had 29 tackles and one sack. After the season, Lane entered the transfer portal and committed to the University of Tennessee. He entered his first year at Tennessee in 2026 as a starter after Edrees Farooq suffered a season-ending injury.

== Personal life ==
His brother, Rayuan Lane III, is also a safety and plays for the Jacksonville Jaguars.
