= Daune Morris =

American football player

No. 17 – Tennessee Volunteers
- Position: Running back
- Class: Sophomore

Personal information
- Listed height: 5 ft 10 in (1.78 m)
- Listed weight: 200 lb (91 kg)

Career information
- High school: Oakland (Murfreesboro, Tennessee)
- College: Tennessee (2025–present)
- Stats at ESPN

Daune Morris is an American college football running back for the Tennessee Volunteers.

== Early life ==
Morris attended Red Bank High School in Red Bank, Tennessee before transferring to Oakland High School in Murfreesboro, Tennessee prior to his junior year. As a junior, he had 2,012 rushing yards, 568 receiving yards and 36 total touchdowns. As a senior, he rushed for 1,133 yards and 21 touchdowns. Morris originally committed to play college football at the University of Southern California (USC) before flipping his commitment to the University of Tennessee.

== College career ==
Morris played in seven games his freshman year at Tennessee in 2025, rushing 35 times for 133 yards and one touchdown. He entered the 2026 season as a backup to DeSean Bishop. Morris had his first career 100-yard game in the third game of the season against Kennesaw State, rushing 14 times for 116 yards with a touchdown. On November 13, 2026, Morris suffered a broken leg in a one-vehicle accident and was expected to miss at least one game. Morris was cited for reckless driving after hitting a fire hydrant and four parked cars, with his car coming to a rest on its roof. Morris was previously charged with misdemeanor speeding and failing to exercise due care on Oct. 4 in a different incident.
