= Xavier Gilliam =

American football player

No. 2 – Tennessee Volunteers
- Position: Defensive tackle
- Class: Junior

Personal information
- Listed height: 6 ft 2 in (1.88 m)
- Listed weight: 305 lb (138 kg)

Career information
- High school: Wilde Lake (Columbia, Maryland) Quince Orchard (Gaithersburg, Maryland)
- College: Penn State (2024–2025); Tennessee (2026–present)
- Stats at ESPN

Xavier Harold Gilliam is an American football defensive tackle for the Tennessee Volunteers. He previously played for the Penn State Nittany Lions.

== Early life ==
Gilliam attended Wilde Lake High School in Columbia, Maryland and Quince Orchard High School in Gaithersburg, Maryland. He committed to play college football for the Penn State Nittany Lions over offers from Boston College, Maryland, Ole Miss, Texas A&M, West Virginia, and Virginia Tech.

== College career ==
As a freshman at Penn State in 2024, Gilliam was redshirted. During the 2025 season, he appeared in 13 games with two starts, totaling 15 tackles with two for loss, a forced fumble, and a blocked field goal. After the conclusion of the season, Gilliam entered the NCAA transfer portal.

Gilliam transferred to play for the Tennessee Volunteers. In the 2026 season opener, he posted six tackles with five for loss, and three sacks in a win over Furman.
