= George MacIntyre (quarterback) =

American football player

No. 15 – Tennessee Volunteers
- Position: Quarterback
- Class: Sophomore

Personal information
- Listed height: 6 ft 6 in (1.98 m)
- Listed weight: 208 lb (94 kg)

Career information
- High school: Brentwood Academy (Brentwood, Tennessee)
- College: Tennessee (2025–present)
- Stats at ESPN

George MacIntyre is an American college football quarterback for the Tennessee Volunteers.

== Early life ==
MacIntyre attended Brentwood Academy in Brentwood, Tennessee. During his high school football, career he passed for 8,293 yards with 62 touchdowns over 36 career games. He committed to the University of Tennessee to play college football.

== College career ==
MacIntyre played in two games his first year at Tennessee in 2025 as a backup to Joey Aguilar. He completed seven of nine passes for 69 yards.

=== Statistics ===
Season	Team	Games			Passing								Rushing			
Season	Team	GP	GS	Record	Cmp	Att	Pct	Yds	Y/A	TD	Int	Rtg	Att	Yds	Avg	TD
2025	Tennessee	2	0	–	7	9	77.8	69	7.7	0	0	142.2	0	0	0.0	0
2026	Tennessee	8	4	3–1	78	117	66.7	853	7.3	2	3	128.5	15	0	0.0	0
Career		10	4	3−1	85	126	67.5	922	7.3	2	3	129.4	15	0	0.0	0

== Personal life ==
His grandfather, George MacIntyre and uncle Mike MacIntyre, were both college coaches.
