= Kaiser Permanente =

American integrated managed care company

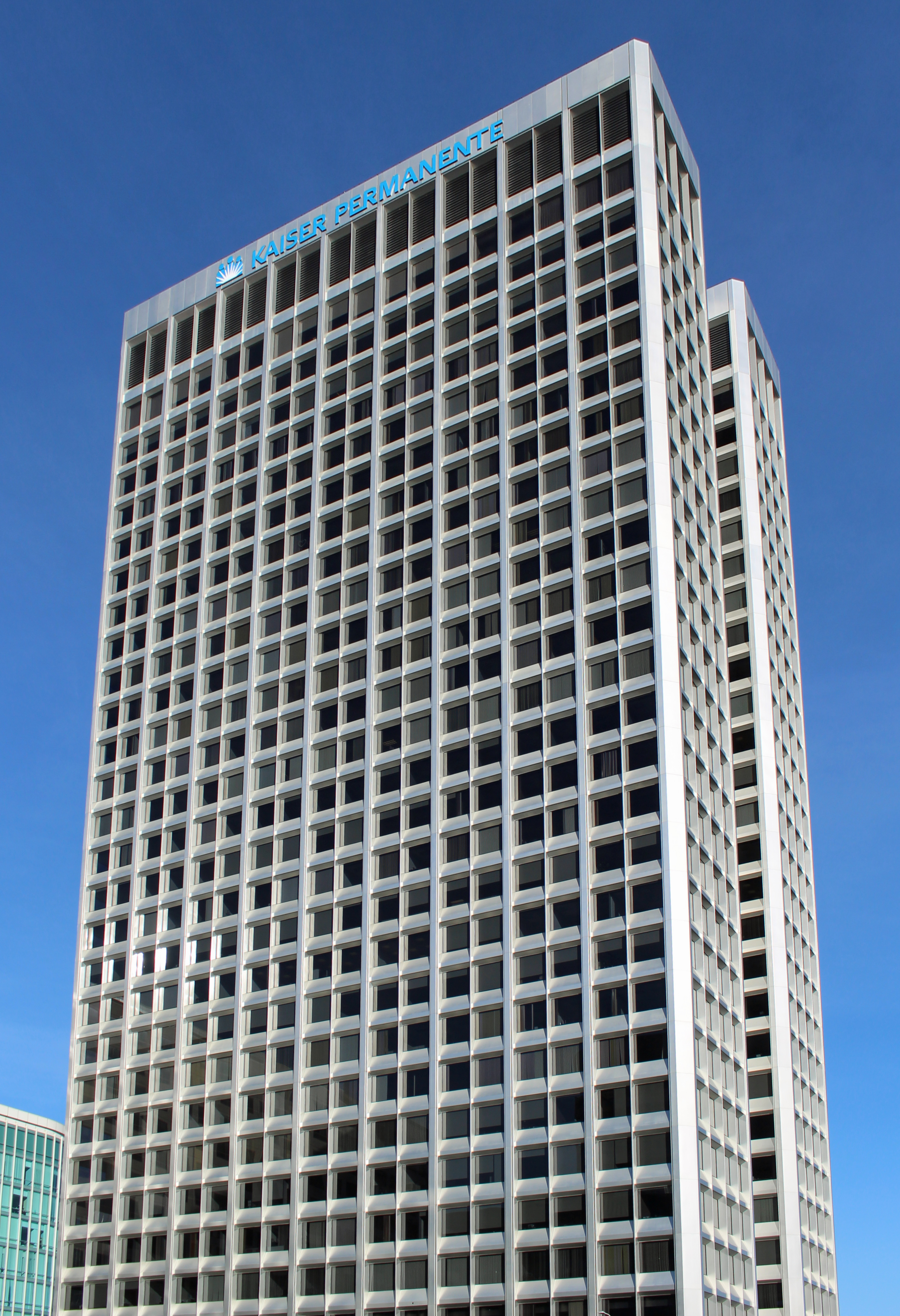
- Headquarters (the Ordway Building) in downtown Oakland
- Type: Consortium of for-profit and not-for-profit entities
- Industry: Healthcare
- Founded: July 21, 1945; 81 years ago
- Founders: Henry J. Kaiser; Sidney R. Garfield
- Headquarters: Ordway Building, Oakland, California, United States
- Number of locations: 40 hospitals and 610 medical facilities (2026) 55 hospitals and 847 medical facilities including Risant Health(2026)
- Area served: California; Colorado; District of Columbia; Georgia; Hawaii; Maryland; Oregon; Nevada; Virginia; Washington
- Key people: Greg A. Adams (chairman & CEO) see section below
- Services: Insurance, Hospital, Healthcare
- Revenue: ▲US$127.7 billion (2025)
- Operating income: ▲US$1.4 billion (2025)
- Members: 13.1 million (2025)
- Number of employees: 243,795 (2025); 78,630 nurses; 25,505 physicians
- Website: kaiserpermanente.org kp.org

Kaiser Permanente (/ˈkaɪzər pɜːrməˈnɛnteɪ/; KP) is an American integrated managed care consortium headquartered in Oakland, California. Founded in 1945 by industrialist Henry J. Kaiser and physician Sidney R. Garfield, the organization was initially established to provide medical services at Kaiser's shipyards, steel mills and other facilities, before being opened to the general public.

Kaiser Permanente operates as a consortium comprising three distinct but interdependent entities: the Kaiser Foundation Health Plan (KFHP) and its regional subsidiaries, Kaiser Foundation Hospitals, and the regional Permanente Medical Groups. As of 2026, Kaiser Permanente serves nine states (California, Colorado, Georgia, Hawaii, Maryland, Nevada, Oregon, Virginia, and Washington) as well as the District of Columbia and is the largest managed care organization in the United States.

Each Permanente Medical Group functions as a separate for-profit partnership or professional corporation within its specific territory. While these groups do not publicly disclose their financial results, they are primarily funded by reimbursements from the Kaiser Foundation Health Plan, one of the largest not-for-profit organizations in the United States. Kaiser employs approximately 243,640 individuals, including more than 100,000 physicians and nurses. The nonprofit Kaiser Foundation Hospitals operate 40 hospitals and more than 614 medical offices, similarly funded by reimbursements from the Kaiser Foundation Health Plan.

Kaiser Permanente's quality of care is often highly rated, attributed to its focus on preventive care, salaried physicians (as opposed to fee-for-service compensation), and efforts to reduce hospital stays by optimizing patient care planning. It has had disputes with employees' unions, faced charges for falsification of records and patient dumping, been under regulatory scrutiny for the quality of its mental health services, and seen criticism over the size of its financial reserves.

== Structure and governance ==
Kaiser Permanente provides care throughout eight regions in the United States. Two or three (four, in the case of California) distinct but interdependent legal entities form the Kaiser system within each region. This structure was adopted by Kaiser Permanente physicians and leaders in 1955.

=== Governance ===
Each entity of Kaiser Permanente has its own management and governance structure, although all of the structures are interdependent and cooperative to a great extent. There are multiple affiliated mixed profits registered with the U.S. Internal Revenue Service. According to Form 990 governance questions, Kaiser Foundation Hospitals and Kaiser Foundation Health Plan do not have members with the power to appoint or elect board members, meaning that the board itself nominates and appoints new members.

James A. Vohs was appointed CEO in 1978 and chairman in 1980, and remained until his retirement in 1992. He was the first chairman to not be a member of the Kaiser family.

David M. Lawrence was chairman and CEO until his retirement in 2002.

George Halvorson became the chairman and CEO until his retirement in December 2013.

On November 5, 2012, the board of directors announced that Bernard J. Tyson, Kaiser's president and chief operating officer for the last two years, would replace Halvorson. Tyson died in November 2019. Greg A. Adams assumed the role of chairman and CEO in December 2019.

=== Operations ===
As of 2026, Kaiser Permanente had 12.9 million health plan members, 225,854 employees, 78,630 nurses and 25,270 physicians, 40 hospitals, and 610 medical offices. Kaiser Foundation Health Plan and Kaiser Foundation Hospitals entities, including Risant Health, reported an operating income of $1.4 billion on $127.7 billion in operating revenues in 2025.

The two types of organizations which make up each regional entity are:

- Kaiser Foundation Health Plans (KFHP) work with employers, employees, and individual members to offer prepaid health plans and insurance. The health plans are not-for-profit and provide infrastructure for and invest in Kaiser Foundation Hospitals and provide a tax-exempt shelter for the for-profit medical groups.
- Permanente Medical Groups are physician-owned organizations, which provide and arrange for medical care for Kaiser Foundation Health Plan members in each respective region. The medical groups are for-profit partnerships or professional corporations and receive nearly all of their funding from Kaiser Foundation Health Plans. The first medical group, The Permanente Medical Group (TPMG), formed in 1948 in Northern California, is one of the largest doctors groups in the United States with 11,225 medical professionals and 186 locations at the beginning of 2023. Permanente physicians become stockholders in TPMG after three years at the company.

In addition, Kaiser Foundation Hospitals (despite the plural name, a single legal entity) operates medical centers in California, Oregon, and Hawaii, and outpatient facilities in the remaining Kaiser Permanente regions. The hospital foundation entity is not-for-profit and relies on the Kaiser Foundation Health Plans for funding. It also provides infrastructure and facilities that benefit the for-profit medical groups.

=== Regional entities ===
Kaiser Permanente is administered through eight regions, including one parent and six subordinate health plan entities, one hospital entity, and nine separate, affiliated medical groups:

Various legal entities serve the areas of the US where Kaiser operates: California (the largest two), Colorado, Georgia, Hawaii, mid-Atlantic, Nevada, Pacific Northwest, and Washington.
- Northern California, 3,351,449 members
  - Kaiser Foundation Health Plan, Inc. (KFHP)
  - Kaiser Foundation Hospitals (KFH)
  - The Permanente Medical Group, Inc. (TPMG)
- Southern California, 3,499,035 members
  - Kaiser Foundation Health Plan, Inc. (KFHP)
  - Kaiser Foundation Hospitals (KFH)
  - Southern California Permanente Medical Group (SCPMG)
- Colorado, 531,908 members
  - Kaiser Foundation Health Plan of Colorado (KFHPCO)
  - Colorado Permanente Medical Group, P.C. (CPMG)
- Georgia, 222,074 members
  - Kaiser Foundation Health Plan of Georgia, Inc. (KFHPGA)
  - The Southeast Permanente Medical Group, Inc. (TSPMG)
- Hawaii, 226,900 members
  - Kaiser Foundation Health Plan, Inc. (KFHP)
  - Kaiser Foundation Hospitals (KFH)
  - Hawaii Permanente Medical Group, Inc. (HPMG)
- Mid-Atlantic (vicinity of Washington, D.C., including Maryland and Virginia), 581,000 members
  - Kaiser Foundation Health Plan of the Mid-Atlantic States Inc. (KFHPMA)
  - Mid-Atlantic Permanente Medical Group, P.C. (MAPMG)
- Northwest (Northwest Oregon and Southwest Washington), 480,386 members
  - Kaiser Foundation Health Plan of the Northwest (KFHPNW)
  - Kaiser Foundation Hospitals (KFH)
  - Northwest Permanente, P.C. Physicians and Surgeons (NWP)
- Washington (except Southwest Washington), 681,386 members
  - Kaiser Foundation Health Plan of Washington
  - Washington Permanente Medical Group (Group Health Cooperative before 2017)

In addition to the regional entities, in 1997, the then-twelve Permanente Medical Groups created The Permanente Federation LLC, a separate entity, which focuses on standardizing patient care and performance under one name and system of policies. Around the same time, The Permanente Company was also chartered as a vehicle to provide investment opportunities for the for-profit Permanente Medical Groups. One of the ventures of the Permanente Company is Kaiser Permanente Ventures, a venture capital firm that invests in emerging medical technologies.

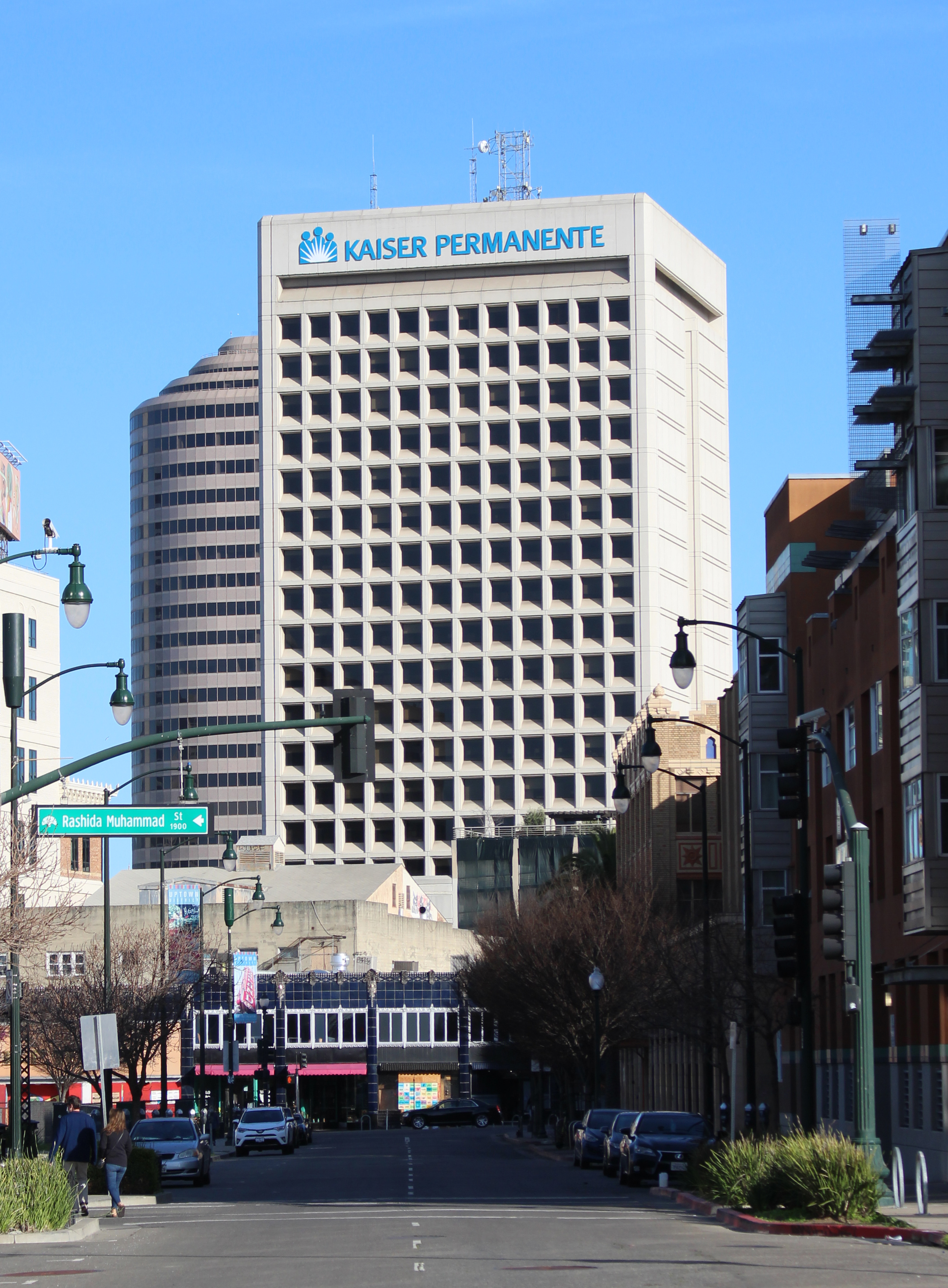
One of Kaiser's six other office buildings in Oakland

=== Lobbying entity ===
A mutual benefit corporation named "Kaiser Foundation for the Advancement of Integrated Health Care" was established on December 27, 2017. The specific purpose of the corporation is "to advocate for and promote the integrated models of health care". The corporation's founder, Maryann Bodayle, has served as the "Governance Administrator" of Kaiser Foundation Health Plan, Inc. since 2013.

== History ==
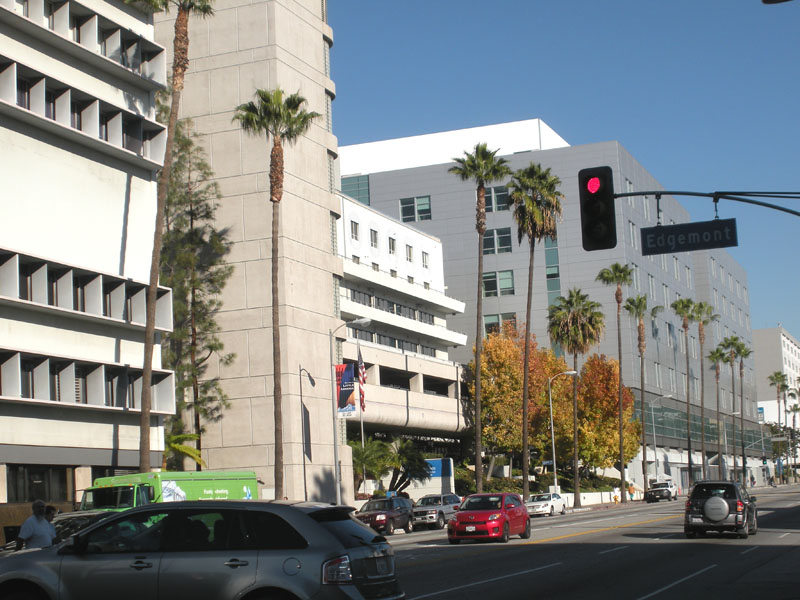
Kaiser Sunset Hospital complex in Los Angeles, California

=== Early years ===
The history of Kaiser Permanente dates to 1933 and a tiny hospital in the town of Desert Center, California. At that time, Henry J. Kaiser and several other large construction contractors had formed an insurance consortium called Industrial Indemnity to meet their workers' compensation obligations. Sidney Garfield had just finished his residency at Los Angeles County-USC Medical Center at a time when jobs were scarce; he was able to secure a contract with Industrial Indemnity to care for 5,000 construction workers building the Colorado River Aqueduct in the Mojave Desert. Soon, Garfield's new hospital was in a precarious financial state (with mounting debt and the staff of three going unpaid), due in part to Garfield's desire to treat all patients regardless of ability to pay, as well as his insistence on equipping the hospital adequately so that critically injured patients could be stabilized for the long journey to full-service hospitals in Los Angeles.

Garfield found willing allies in two Industrial Indemnity executives, Harold Hatch and Alonzo B. Ordway. It was Hatch who proposed to Garfield the specific solution that would lead to the creation of Kaiser Permanente: Industrial Indemnity would prepay 17.5% of premiums, or $1.50 per worker per month, to cover work-related injuries, while the workers would each contribute five cents per day to cover non-work-related injuries. Later, Garfield also credited Ordway with coming up with the general idea of prepayment for industrial health care and explained that he did not know much at the time about other similar health plans except for the Ross-Loos Medical Group.

Hatch's solution enabled Garfield to bring his budget back into the positive, and to experiment with providing a broader range of services to the workers besides pure emergency care. By the time work on the aqueduct concluded and the project was wrapped up, Garfield had paid off all of his debts, was supervising ten physicians at three hospitals, and controlled a financial reserve of $150,000.

Garfield returned to Los Angeles for further study at County-USC with the intent of entering private practice. In March 1938, Consolidated Industries (a consortium led by the Kaiser Company) initiated work on a contract for the upper half of the Grand Coulee Dam in Washington state, and took over responsibility for the thousands of workers who had worked for a different construction consortium on the first half of the dam. Edgar Kaiser, Henry's son, was in charge of the project. To smooth over relations with the workers (who had been treated poorly by their earlier employer), Hatch and Ordway persuaded Edgar to meet with Garfield, and in turn Edgar persuaded Garfield to tour the Grand Coulee site. Garfield subsequently agreed to reproduce at Grand Coulee Dam what he had done on the Colorado River Aqueduct project. He immediately spent $100,000 on renovating the decrepit Mason City Hospital and hired seven physicians.

Unlike the workers on Garfield's first project, many workers at Grand Coulee Dam had brought dependents with them. The unions soon forced the Kaiser Company to expand its plan to cover dependents, which resulted in a dramatic shift from industrial medicine into family practice and enabled Garfield to formulate some of the basic principles of Kaiser Permanente. It was also during this time that Henry Kaiser personally became acquainted with Garfield and forged a friendship which lasted until Kaiser's death.

=== World War II ===
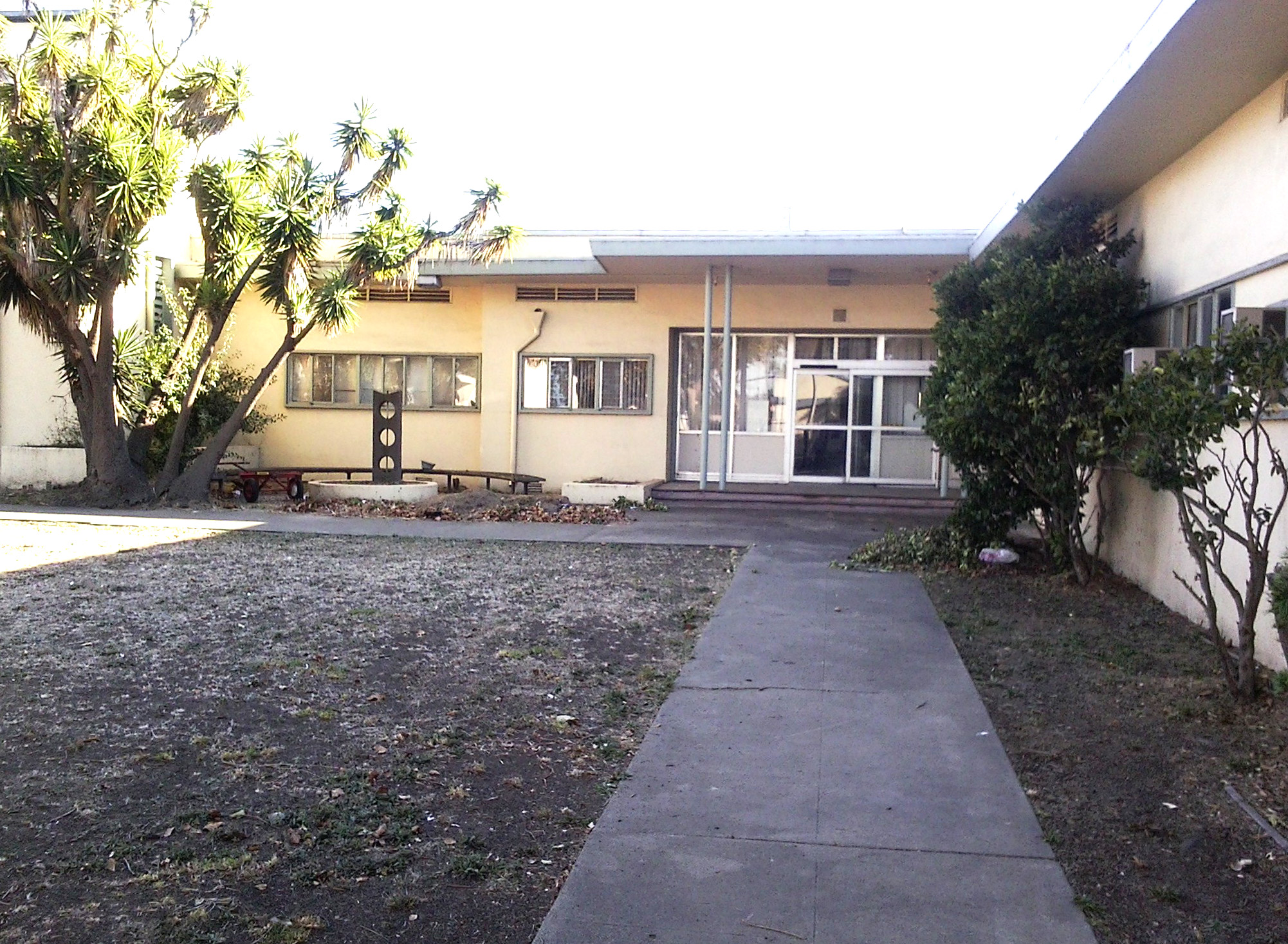
Kaiser Field Hospital in Richmond, California. Defunct since 1995

In 1939, the Kaiser Company began work on several huge shipbuilding contracts in Oakland, and by the end of 1941 would control four major shipyards on the West Coast. During 1940, the expansion of the American defense-industrial complex in preparation for entrance into World War II resulted in a massive increase in the number of employees at the Richmond shipyard. In January 1941, Henry Kaiser asked Garfield to set up an insurance plan for the Richmond workers (this was merely contract negotiation with insurance companies), and a year later Kaiser asked Garfield to duplicate at Richmond what he had done at Desert Center and Mason City. Unlike the two other projects, the resulting entity lived on after the construction project that gave birth to it, and it is the direct ancestor of today's Kaiser Permanente.

On March 1, 1942, Sidney R. Garfield & Associates opened its offices in Oakland to provide care to 20,000 workers, followed by the opening of the Permanente Health Plan on June 1. From the beginning, Kaiser Permanente strongly supported preventive medicine and attempted to educate its members about maintaining their own health.

In July, the Permanente Foundation formed to operate Northern California hospitals that would be linked to the outpatient health plans, followed shortly thereafter by the creation of Northern Permanente Foundation for Oregon and Washington and Southern Permanente Foundation for California. The name Permanente came from Permanente Creek, which flowed past Henry Kaiser's Kaiser Permanente Cement Plant on Black Mountain in Cupertino, California. Kaiser's first wife, Bess Fosburgh, liked the name. An abandoned Oakland facility was modernized as the 170-bed Permanente Hospital opened on August 1, 1942 (this facility evolved over the decades into today's flagship Kaiser Oakland Medical Center). Three weeks later, the 71-bed Richmond Field Hospital opened. Six first aid stations were set up in the shipyards to treat industrial accidents and minor illness. Each first aid station had an ambulance ready to rush patients to the surgical field hospital if required. Stabilized patients could be moved to the larger hospital for recuperative care. The Northern Permanente Hospital opened two weeks later to serve workers at the Kaiser shipyard in Vancouver, Washington. Shipyard workers paid seven cents per day for comprehensive health care coverage, and within a year, the shipyard health plan employed sixty physicians with salaries between $450 and $1,000 per month. These physicians established California Physicians Service to offer similar health coverage to the families of shipyard workers. In 1944, Kaiser decided to continue the program after the war and to open it up to the general public.

Meanwhile, during the war years, the American Medical Association (AMA) (which opposed managed care organizations from their very beginning) tried to defuse demand for managed care by promoting the rapid expansion of the Blue Cross and Blue Shield preferred provider organization networks.

Courage to Heal, a novel by KP Historical Society President and Medical Director Emeritus of KP San Diego Paul Bernstein, MD, is based on the story of Garfield's life, his struggles with the AMA, and the origins of Kaiser Permanente.

=== Postwar growth ===
In 1943, Henry J. Kaiser and Dr. Sidney R. Garfield opened a 50-bed hospital, housing six physicians for the 3000 employees and their families at the new Kaiser Steel Mill in Fontana, California, offering a pre-paid health care plan for $0.60/week for adults, and $0.30/week for children. In 1945, the Kaiser Permanente health plan was opened to the public.

In 1948, Kaiser established the Henry J. Kaiser Family Foundation (also known as Kaiser Family Foundation), a U.S.-based Mixed profit, private operating foundation focusing on the major health care issues facing the nation. The Foundation, not associated with Kaiser Permanente or Kaiser Industries, is an independent voice and source of facts and analysis for policymakers, the media, the health care community, and the general public.

The end of World War II brought about a huge plunge in Kaiser Permanente membership; for example, 50,000 workers had left the Northern California yards by July 1945. Membership bottomed out at 17,000 for the entire system but then surged back to 26,000 within six months as Garfield aggressively marketed his plan to the public. Sidney Garfield & Associates had been a sole proprietorship, but in 1948, it was reorganized into a partnership, Permanente Medical Group.

During this period, a substantial amount of growth came from union members; the unions saw Kaiser Permanente care as more affordable and comprehensive than what was available at the time from private physicians under the fee-for-service system. For example, Fortune magazine had reported in 1944 that 90% of the U.S. population could not afford fee-for-service health care. Kaiser Permanente membership soared to 154,000 in 1950, 283,000 in 1952, 470,000 in 1954, 556,000 in 1956, and 618,000 in 1958.

From 1944 onward, both Kaiser Permanente and Garfield fought off numerous attacks from the AMA and various state and local medical societies. Henry Kaiser came to the defense of both Garfield and the health plans he had created.

In 1951, the organization acquired its current name when Henry Kaiser unilaterally directed the trustees of the health plans, hospital foundations, and medical groups to add his name before Permanente. The physicians in the Permanente Medical Group were proud professionals who deeply resented the implication that they were directly controlled by Kaiser, and successfully forced him to back off with respect to their part of the organization. That same year, Kaiser Permanente also began experiments with large-scale multiphasic screening to identify unknown conditions and to facilitate treatment of known ones. Simultaneously, although no one questioned his medical competence, Garfield's deficiencies as an executive were becoming apparent as the organization expanded far beyond his ability to manage it properly.

With his wartime glory receding into history, Henry Kaiser became fascinated with the health care system created for him by Garfield and began to directly manage Kaiser Permanente and Garfield. This resulted in a financial disaster when Kaiser splurged on the new Walnut Creek hospital; his constant intermeddling led to significant friction at every level of the organization. The situation was not helped by Kaiser's marriage to Garfield's head administrative nurse (who had helped care for Kaiser's first wife on her deathbed), convincing Garfield to marry the sister of that nurse, and then having Garfield move in next door to him. Clifford Keene (who would eventually be president of Kaiser Permanente) later recalled that this arrangement resulted in a rather dysfunctional and combative family in charge of Kaiser Permanente.

Keene was an experienced Permanente physician whom Garfield had personally hired in 1946. During 1953 he had been trying to get a job at U.S. Steel, but on the morning of December 5, 1953, with internal tensions worsening day by day, Garfield met with Keene at the Mark Hopkins Hotel in San Francisco and asked him to turn around the organization. It took Keene 15 years to realize that Kaiser had forced Garfield to ask Keene to become his replacement. Due to the chaos on the board, Keene at first took control with the vague title of Executive Associate, but it soon became clear to everyone that he was actually in charge and Garfield was to become a lobbyist and "ambassador" for the HMO concept.

Even with Garfield out of day-to-day management, the underlying problem of Henry Kaiser's authoritarian style continued. After several tense confrontations between Kaiser and Permanente Medical Group physicians, the doctors met with Kaiser's top adviser, Eugene Trefethen, at Kaiser's personal estate near Lake Tahoe on July 12, 1955. Trefethen came up with the idea of a contract between the medical groups and the health plans and hospital foundations that would set out roles, responsibilities, and financial distribution. Trefethen, already a successful attorney, went on to a successful career with Kaiser Permanente and in retirement became a famous vintner.

While Keene and Trefethen struggled to fix the damage from Kaiser's micromanagement and Garfield's ineffectual management, Henry Kaiser moved to Oahu in 1956 and insisted on expanding Kaiser Permanente into Hawaii in 1958. He quickly ruined what should have been a simple project, and only a last-minute intervention by Keene and Trefethen in August 1960 prevented the total disintegration of the Hawaii organization. By that year, Kaiser membership had grown to 808,000.

=== Managed care era ===
Having overseen Kaiser Permanente's successful transformation from Henry Kaiser's health care experiment into a large-scale self-sustaining enterprise, Keene retired in 1975. By 1976, membership reached three million. In 1977, all six of Kaiser Permanente's regions had become federally qualified health maintenance organizations.

In 1980, Kaiser acquired a Mixed profit group practice to create its Mid-Atlantic region, encompassing the District of Columbia, Maryland, and Virginia. In 1985, Kaiser Permanente expanded to Georgia.

=== Regional evolution ===
By 1990, Kaiser Permanente provided coverage for about a third of the population of the cities of San Francisco and Oakland; total Northern California membership was over 2.4 million.

Elsewhere, Kaiser Permanente did not do as well, and its geographic footprint changed significantly in the 1990s. The organization spun off or closed outposts in Texas, North Carolina, and the Northeast. In 1998, Kaiser Permanente sold its Texas operations, where reported problems had become so severe that the organization directed its lawyers to attempt to block the release of a Texas Department of Insurance report. This prompted the state attorney general to threaten to revoke the organization's license. Kaiser Permanente closed health plans in Charlotte and Raleigh-Durham in North Carolina four years later. The organization also sold its unprofitable Northeast division in 2000. The Ohio division was sold to Catholic Health Partners in 2013.

In 1995, Kaiser Permanente celebrated its fiftieth anniversary as a public health plan. Two years later, national membership reached nine million. In 1997, the organization established an agreement with the AFL-CIO to explore a new approach to the relationship between management and labor, known as the Labor Management Partnership. Going into the new millennium, competition in the managed care market increased dramatically, raising new concerns. The Southern California Permanente Medical Group saw declining rates of new members as other managed care groups flourished.

In 2017, Kaiser acquired Group Health Cooperative, which has clients in the state of Washington outside of Southwest Washington. Group Health was started in part from funds from longshoremen in Washington state, who were left out when Kaiser chose not to expand north of the Portland area.

On April 26, 2023, Kaiser announced it would acquire Geisinger Health System. As part of the deal, Geisinger would operate as an independent subsidiary, folded into a new mixed-profit group called Risant Health. On June 21, 2024, it was announced that Risant Health would acquire Cone Health, a hospital system based in Greensboro, North Carolina.

On September 10, 2025, Kaiser announced a joint venture with Renown Health to expand into northern Nevada. Kaiser Permanente will acquire a majority interest in Hometown Health, Renown Health's insurance subsidiary and that it would be rebranded to Kaiser Permanente Nevada. On February 3, 2026, the joint venture was finalized. Kaiser officially entered the Reno metropolitan area on July 1, 2026 with medical offices opening in Reno and Sparks. Existing Hometown Health independently contracted medical providers were removed from the network with HMO patients being told to see Kaiser or Renown physicians, which caused controversy.

=== KP HealthConnect ===
In 2002, Kaiser Permanente abandoned its attempt to build its own clinical information system with IBM, writing off some $452 million in software assets. This information technology failure led to major changes in the organization's approach to digital records. Under George Halvorson's direction, Kaiser looked closely at two medical software vendors, Cerner and Epic Systems, ultimately selecting Epic as the primary vendor for a new system, branded KP HealthConnect. Although Kaiser's approach shifted to "buy, not build," the project was unprecedented for a civilian system in size and scope. Deployed across all eight regions over six years and at a cost of more than $6 billion, by 2010, it was the largest civilian electronic medical record system, serving more than 8.6 million Kaiser Permanente members, implemented at a cost exceeding a half million dollars per physician. As of 2020 KP HealthConnect supports 12.2 million members.

=== International reputation ===
Early in the 21st century, the NHS and UK Department of Health became impressed with some aspects of the Kaiser operation and initiated a series of studies involving several health care organizations in England. Visits occurred and suggestions of adopting some KP policies are currently active. The management of hospital bed-occupancy by KP, by means of integrated management in and out of hospital and monitoring progress against care pathways has given rise to trials of similar techniques in eight areas of the UK.

In 2002, a controversial study by California-based academics published in the British Medical Journal compared Kaiser to the British National Health Service, finding Kaiser to be superior in several respects. Subsequently, a group of health policy academics who were experts on the NHS published a competing analysis claiming that Kaiser's costs were actually substantially higher than the NHS and for a younger and healthier population.

== Quality of care ==
In the California Healthcare Quality Report Card 2013 Edition, Kaiser Permanente's Northern California and Southern California regions, KP received four out of four possible stars in Meeting National Standards of Care. KP North and South also received three out of four stars in Members Rate Their HMO. KP's performance has been attributed to three practices: First, KP places a strong emphasis on preventive care, reducing costs later on. Second, its doctors are salaried rather than paid per service, which removes the main incentive for doctors to perform unnecessary procedures. Thirdly, KP attempts to minimize the time patients spend in high-cost hospitals by carefully planning their stay and by shifting care to outpatient clinics. This practice results in lower costs per member, cost savings for KP and greater doctor attention to patients. A comparison to the UK's National Health Service found that patients spend 2–5 times as much time in NHS hospitals as compared to KP hospitals.

In June 2013, the California Department of Managed Health Care (DMHC) levied a $4 million fine, the second largest in the agency's history, against Kaiser for not providing adequate mental health care to its patients. Alleged violations of California's timely access laws included failures to accurately track wait times and track doctor availability amid evidence of inconsistent electronic and paper records. It was also found by the DMHC that patients received written materials circulated by Kaiser dissuading them from seeking care, a violation of state and federal laws. DMHC also issued a cease and desist order for Kaiser to end the practices. DMHC conducted a follow-up investigation which published in April 2015. The report found Kaiser had put systems in place to better track how patients were being cared for but still had not addressed problems with actually providing mental health care that complied with state and federal laws. Kaiser's challenges on this front were exacerbated by a long, unresolved labor dispute with the union representing therapists.

Kaiser appealed the findings, the order, and the fine, and sought to keep the proceedings closed, but in September 2014, in the face of the administrative judge's order to keep the proceedings open, and facing the beginning of public testimony, Kaiser withdrew the appeal and paid the $4 million. It also issued a statement which denied much of the wrongdoing. Kaiser faces ongoing inspections by DMHC and three class-action lawsuits related to the issues identified by the DMHC.

== Research and publishing ==
Kaiser operates a Division of Research, which annually conducts between 200 and 300 studies, and the Center for Health Research, which in 2009 had more than 300 active studies. Kaiser's bias toward prevention is reflected in the areas of interest—vaccine and genetic studies are prominent. The work is funded primarily by federal, state, and other outside (non-Kaiser) institutions.

Kaiser has created and operates a voluntary biobank of donated blood samples from members along with their medical record and the responses to a lifestyle and health survey. As of November 2018, the Kaiser Permanente Research Bank had over 300,000 samples, with a goal of 500,000. De-identified data is shared with both Kaiser researchers and researchers from other institutions.

== Kaiser Permanente Bernard J. Tyson School of Medicine ==
Kaiser Permanente announced its plan to start a medical school in December, 2015, and the school welcomed its inaugural class in June 2020. The vision for the school is to redesign physician education around the pillars of patient-centered care, population health, quality improvement, team-based care, and health equity.

Mark Schuster was named the medical school's Founding Dean and CEO in 2017. The Kaiser Permanente Bernard J. Tyson School of Medicine was renamed from the Kaiser Permanente School of Medicine in November 2019 in honor of late Kaiser Permanente Chairman and CEO Bernard J. Tyson. The medical school received preliminary LCME accreditation in February 2019 and received full LCME accreditation in June 2024. The school waived all tuition for its first five classes.

== Controversies ==
=== Patient dumping ===
In 2006 Kaiser settled five cases for alleged patient dumping—the delivery of homeless hospitalized patients to other agencies or organizations in order to avoid expensive medical care—between 2002 and 2005. Los Angeles city officials had filed civil and criminal legal action against Kaiser Permanente for patient dumping, which was the first action of its kind that the city had taken. The city's decision to charge Kaiser Permanente reportedly was influenced by security camera footage, allegedly showing a 63-year-old patient, dressed in hospital gown and slippers, wandering toward a mission on Skid Row (this footage was prominently featured in the Michael Moore 2007 documentary Sicko). At the time that the complaint was filed, city officials said that 10 other hospitals were under investigation for similar issues. Kaiser settled the case, paying $5,000 in civil penalties and agreeing to spend $500,000 on services for the homeless. During that same period, the Department of Health and Human Services' Office of the Inspector General settled 102 cases against U.S. hospitals that resulted in a monetary payment to the agency.

=== Organ transplant program ===
In 2004, Northern California Kaiser Permanente initiated an in-house program for kidney transplantation. Prior to opening the transplant center, Northern California Kaiser patients would generally receive transplants at medical centers associated with the University of California (UC San Francisco and UC Davis). Upon opening the transplant center, Kaiser required that members who are transplant candidates in Northern California obtain services exclusively through its internal KP-owned transplant center.

While it was in operation, the Kaiser program had a 100% survival rate, which is better than other transplant centers. Patients who wanted a kidney were less likely to get one. Northern California Kaiser performed 56 transplants in 2005, and twice that many patients died while waiting for a kidney. At other California transplant centers, more than twice as many people received kidneys than died during the same period. Unlike other centers, the Kaiser program did not perform riskier transplants or use donated organs from elderly or other higher-risk people, which have worse outcomes. Northern California Kaiser closed the kidney transplant program in May 2006. As before, Northern California Kaiser now pays for pre-transplant care and transplants at other hospitals. This change affected approximately 2,000 patients.

=== Mandatory arbitration ===
Kaiser requires an agreement by planholders to submit patient malpractice claims to arbitration rather than litigating through the court system. This has triggered some opposition.

=== Labor unions ===
While Doctors of Medicine (M.D.) and Doctors of Osteopathic Medicine (D.O.) are partners within the for-profit physician groups, many employees are members of various unions and guilds, depending on their role and service area.

KP's California operations were subject to four labor strikes in 2011 and 2012, involving nurses, mental health providers, and other professionals. The National Union of Healthcare Workers (NUHW) accused Kaiser of deliberately stalling negotiations while profiting $2.1 billion in 2011 and paying its CEO George Halvorson $9 million annually. The workers were dissatisfied with proposed changes to pensions and other benefits.

On November 11, 2014, an estimated 18,000 nurses went on strike at KP hospitals in Northern California over Ebola safeguards and patient-care standards during union contract talks. 21 hospitals and 35 clinics in the San Francisco Bay Area were affected.

In October 2023, as many as 75,000 Kaiser healthcare workers went on a three-day strike at KP hospitals and clinics. The Union had accused Kaiser of failing to address critical staff shortages, and demanded higher pay for staff. In November 2023 the workers voted to ratify a new four-year contract that addressed the demands.

On October 21, 2024, 2,400 Kaiser Permanente Southern California mental health therapists, psychologists, and psychiatric nurses went on strike for equity. The National Union of Healthcare Workers members are striking for adequate staffing and time to complete all patient care tasks, pay increases that are equitable to other Kaiser employees and that keep up with inflation, and the restoration of pension benefits to match what 95% or more Kaiser employees are already receiving.

The California Department of Managed Healthcare (DMHC) has begun investigating Kaiser's contingency plan during the strike. Kaiser reports that they have comprehensive plans to ensure patient access to care, and this is currently being closely monitored by the DMHC.

=== Strikes and labor disputes ===
Kaiser Permanente has experienced numerous labor disputes and strikes across its history, often centered on staffing levels, wages, and working conditions. These disputes have involved several unions, including the National Union of Healthcare Workers (NUHW), the Alliance of Health Care Unions (AHCU), and the Coalition of Kaiser Permanente Unions (CKPU). Below is a comprehensive account of major strikes involving these unions.

==== National Union of Healthcare Workers ====
The National Union of Healthcare Workers (NUHW) has led several significant strikes involving Kaiser Permanente employees. These strikes often focused on issues such as staffing shortages, patient care, and working conditions.

- January 12–16, 2015: Approximately 2,600 mental health clinicians and 700 optical workers in California conducted a five-day strike to protest staffing shortages and patient care issues.
- December 10–14, 2018: Approximately 4,000 mental health clinicians and other healthcare professionals in California participated in a five-day strike advocating for improved patient care and working conditions.
- March 18–22, 2019: NUHW-represented mental health clinicians conducted a five-day strike addressing issues related to patient care and staffing.
- November 11–15, 2019: Mental health clinicians and healthcare professionals held a five-day strike to protest staffing shortages and advocate for better patient care.
- August 15 – October 18, 2022: Nearly 2,000 mental health therapists in Northern California engaged in a 10-week strike, concluding with a tentative agreement addressing patient care and staffing concerns.
- August 29, 2022 – February 16, 2023: Approximately 50 mental health clinicians in Hawai'i conducted a 172-day strike, the longest mental health strike in U.S. history at that time, to secure a first contract.
- October 21, 2024 – May 8, 2025: Over 2,400 mental health professionals in Southern California began an 196-day strike, breaking the previous record set in Hawai'i the previous year, focusing on staffing shortages and increased workloads.

==== Alliance of Health Care Unions ====
- November 2021: Over 30,000 AHCU members planned a strike over staffing shortages and a proposed two-tier wage system. A tentative agreement was reached on November 13, 2021, averting the strike.

==== Coalition of Kaiser Permanente Unions ====
- October 4–7, 2023: From October 4 to 7, 2023, approximately 75,000 healthcare workers conducted a three-day strike, making it the largest healthcare worker strike in U.S. history. The strike focused on staffing shortages and wage concerns. A tentative agreement was reached on October 13, 2023, setting minimum hourly wages at $25 in California and $23 in other states and providing a 21% wage increase over four years.

==== Other ====
- 2011–2012: KP's California operations experienced four labor strikes involving nurses, mental health providers, and other professionals. The NUHW accused Kaiser of stalling negotiations while profiting $2.1 billion in 2011 and paying its CEO George Halvorson $9 million annually.
- November 11, 2014: Approximately 18,000 nurses went on strike over Ebola safeguards and patient-care standards during union contract talks, affecting 21 hospitals and 35 clinics in Northern California.
- October 2023: Approximately 75,000 healthcare workers went on a three-day strike, demanding higher pay and addressing staff shortages. A new four-year contract was ratified in November 2023.

=== Regulatory oversight ===
During the 2024-2025 Southern California mental health strike, the California Department of Managed Healthcare (DMHC) began investigating Kaiser's contingency plans to ensure compliance with patient care standards.

=== Cash reserves ===
Jamie Court, president of the Foundation for Taxpayer and Consumer Rights has said that Kaiser's retained profits are evidence that Kaiser policies are overpriced and that health insurance regulation is needed.

State insurance regulations require that insurers maintain certain minimum amounts of cash reserves to ensure that they are able to meet their obligations; the amount varies by insurer, based on its risk factors, such as its investments, how many people it insures, and other factors; a few states also have caps on how large the reserves can be.

Kaiser has been criticized by activists and state regulators for the size of its cash reserves. As of 2015, it had $21.7 billion in cash reserves, which was about 1,600% the amount required by California state regulations. Its reserves had been a target of advertising by Consumer Watchdog supporting Proposition 45 in California's 2014 elections. At the end of 2010 Kaiser held $666 million in reserves, which was about 1,300% of the minimum required under Colorado state law. Those funds were in Kaiser's risk-based capital account, held to pay for disasters or major projects. In 2008, the Colorado regulator required Kaiser to spend down its reserves; after negotiations Kaiser agreed to spend $155 million of its reserves giving credits to its clients and building clinics in underserved parts of the state.

=== COVID-19 ===
Kaiser was cited by the California Division of Occupational Safety and Health twelve times and fined nearly $500,000 for violations early in the COVID-19 pandemic pertaining to staff safety following outbreaks of COVID in its hospitals across the state, particularly in the Bay Area. Kaiser appealed the citations. Kaiser was responsible for more than 10% of all COVID violations in California. A COVID-19 outbreak sickened 92 people at Kaiser San Jose Medical Center on Christmas Day 2020. Kaiser San Leandro received the largest portion of fines, nearly $90k, for delays in reporting COVID infections and for failure to ration medical equipment according to pandemic regulations.

== See also ==
- Kaiser Family Foundation
- Kaiser Permanente Arena
