= Edrees Farooq =

American football player

No. 15 – Tennessee Volunteers
- Position: Safety
- Class: Junior

Personal information
- Born: Washington, D.C., U.S.
- Listed height: 6 ft 0 in (1.83 m)
- Listed weight: 202 lb (92 kg)

Career information
- High school: Saint Frances Academy (Baltimore, Maryland)
- College: Tennessee (2024–present)
- Stats at ESPN

Edrees Ameer Farooq is an American football defensive back for the Tennessee Volunteers.

== Early life ==
Farooq attended Saint Frances Academy in Baltimore, Maryland, and committed to play college football for the Tennessee Volunteers over Ohio State and Texas.

== College career ==
As a freshman in 2024, Farooq played in all 13 games, notching 13 tackles with one being for a loss. He entered the 2025 season as a starter in the Volunteers secondary. In week 9 of the 2025 season, Farooq intercepted a pass which he returned 45-yards for a touchdown in a victory over Kentucky. He finished the 2025 season with 76 tackles, three pass deflections, two interceptions, a fumble recovery, four forced fumbles, and a touchdown in 12 starts.
