= 2025 Mercer Bears football team =

American college football season

2025 Mercer Bears football

SoCon champion

NCAA Division I Second Round, L 0–47 vs. South Dakota
- Conference: Southern Conference

Ranking
- STATS: No. 17
- FCS Coaches: No. 18
- Record: 9–3 (8–0 SoCon)
- Head coach: Mike Jacobs (2nd season)
- Offensive coordinator: Anthony Soto (2nd season)
- Offensive scheme: Multiple pro-style
- Defensive coordinator: Jahmal Brown (2nd season)
- Base defense: Multiple
- Home stadium: Five Star Stadium

2025 Southern Conference football standings
	Conf.			Overall
Team	W		L	W		L
No. 17 Mercer $^	8	–	0	9	–	3
Western Carolina	6	–	2	7	–	5
East Tennessee State	5	–	3	7	–	5
Wofford	5	–	3	6	–	6
Chattanooga	4	–	4	5	–	7
Furman	4	–	4	6	–	6
The Citadel	3	–	5	4	–	8
Samford	1	–	7	1	–	11
VMI	0	–	8	1	–	11
$ – Conference champion; ^ – FCS playoff participant; Rankings from STATS Poll

The 2025 Mercer Bears football team represented Mercer University as a member of the Southern Conference (SoCon) during the 2025 NCAA Division I FCS football season. The Bears were led by second-year head coach Mike Jacobs and played at the Five Star Stadium in Macon, Georgia.

== Schedule ==
On August 23, Mercer was set to play in the FCS Kickoff in their only nationally televised game of the season. With eight minutes left in the fourth quarter, the game was suspended due to lightning as UC Davis led 23–17. In the early morning hours of August 24, it was announced that the game would not resume, and that both teams had agreed to declare it a no contest.

Date	Time	Opponent	Rank	Site	TV	Result	Attendance
August 23	7:00 p.m.	vs. No. 8 UC Davis*	No. 11	Cramton Bowl; Montgomery, AL (FCS Kickoff)	ESPN	No contest	
August 30	6:00 p.m.	Presbyterian*	No. 11	Five Star Stadium; Macon, GA	ESPN+	L 10–15	8,149
September 13	6:00 p.m.	Wofford		Five Star Stadium; Macon, GA	ESPN+	W 22–21	7,404
September 20	2:00 p.m.	at The Citadel		Johnson Hagood Stadium; Charleston, SC	ESPN+	W 38–0	11,339
September 27	5:30 p.m.	at East Tennessee State		William B. Greene Jr. Stadium; Johnson City, TN	ESPN+	W 38–34	10,567
October 4	4:00 p.m.	Samford		Five Star Stadium; Macon, GA	ESPN+	W 45–21	9,461
October 11	1:00 p.m.	at Princeton*	No. 25	Powers Field at Princeton Stadium; Princeton, NJ	ESPN+	W 38–14	2,970
October 25	3:00 p.m.	VMI	No. 17	Five Star Stadium; Macon, GA	ESPN+	W 62–0	7,009
November 1	2:00 p.m.	at Furman	No. 15	Paladin Stadium; Greenville, SC	ESPN+	W 52–28	7,867
November 8	2:30 p.m.	at No. 24 Western Carolina	No. 12	Bob Waters Field at E. J. Whitmire Stadium; Cullowhee, NC	ESPN+	W 49–47	14,510
November 15	3:00 p.m.	Chattanooga^{†}	No. 8	Five Star Stadium; Macon, GA	ESPN+	W 63–17	9,289
November 22	2:00 p.m.	at Auburn*	No. 7	Jordan–Hare Stadium; Auburn, AL	SECN+/ESPN+	L 17–62	88,043
December 6	12:00 p.m.	No. 12 South Dakota*	No. 7	Five Star Stadium; Macon, GA (NCAA Division I Second Round)	ESPN+	L 0–47	3,042
*Non-conference game; ^{†}Homecoming; Rankings from STATS Poll released prior to the game; All times are in Eastern time

== Game summaries ==
=== vs. No. 8 UC Davis ===
No. 8 UC Davis Aggies (0–0) vs. No. 11 Mercer Bears (0–0) – Game summary – NO CONTEST

Quarter	1	2	3	4	Total
No. 8 Aggies	-	-	-	-	0
No. 11 Bears	-	-	-	-	0

at Cramton Bowl • Montgomery, AL

- Date: August 23
- Game time: 6:00 PM CDT
- TV announcers (ESPN): Jay Alter (play-by-play) and Rocky Boiman (analyst)

Statistics	UCD	MER
First downs	–	–
Total yards	–	–
Rushing yards	–	–
Passing yards	–	–
Passing: Comp–Att–Int	–	–
Time of possession	–	–

Team	Category	Player	Statistics
UC Davis	Passing	–	–
UC Davis	Rushing	–	–
UC Davis	Receiving	–	–
Mercer	Passing	–	–
Mercer	Rushing	–	–
Mercer	Receiving	–	–

=== Presbyterian ===
Presbyterian Blue Hose (0-0) vs. No. 11 Mercer Bears (0-0) – Game summary

Quarter	1	2	3	4	Total
Blue Hose	0	6	3	6	15
No. 11 Bears	7	0	3	0	10

at Five Star Stadium • Macon, GA

- Date: August 30
- Game time: 6:00 PM EDT
- TV announcers (ESPN+): Frank Malloy and Phil Cox

Game information

First Quarter

- 0:04 – MER – Adonis McDaniel 11 Yd pass from DJ Smith (Reice Griffith Kick). Mercer 0–7. Drive: 10 plays, 80 yards, 4:02

Second Quarter

- 9:37 - PRE – Nathan Levicki 29 Yd pass from Collin Hurst (Jett Jackson PAT failed). Mercer 6–7 Drive: 11 plays, 75 yards, 5:27

Third Quarter

- 8:53 – MER – Reice Griffith 22 Yd Field Goal. Mercer 6–10. Drive: 6 plays, 20 yards, 2:48
- 3:54 – PRE – Jett Jackson 29 Yd Field Goal. Mercer 9–10. Drive: 11 plays, 61 yards, 4:53.

Fourth Quarter

0:56 – PRE – Zach Switzer 16 Yd Run (Two-Point Pass Conversion Failed). Presbyterian 15–10. Drive: 13 plays, 80 yards, 5:39

Statistics	PRES	MER
First downs	20	16
Total yards	416	241
Rushing yards	113	87
Passing yards	303	154
Passing: Comp–Att–Int	7–55–1	5–41–1
Time of possession	35:50	24:10

Team	Category	Player	Statistics
Presbyterian	Passing	Collin Hurst	25/38, 303 yards, 1 INT, 1 TD
Presbyterian	Rushing	Zach Switzer	9 carries, 33 yards, 1 TD
Presbyterian	Receiving	Dominic Kibby	9 receptions, 114 yards
Mercer	Passing	DJ Smith	22/36, 154 yards, 1 INT, 1 TD
Mercer	Rushing	Micah Bell	4 carries, 32 yards
Mercer	Receiving	Brayden Smith	4 receptions, 56 yards

=== Wofford ===
Wofford Terriers (0-2) vs. Mercer Bears (0-1) – Game summary

Quarter	1	2	3	4	Total
Terriers	-	-	-	-	0
Bears	-	-	-	-	0

at Five Star Stadium • Macon, GA

- Date: September 13
- Game time: 6:00 p.m. EDT
- TV announcers (ESPN+): Frank Malloy (play-by-play) and Phil Cox (analyst)

Statistics	WOF	MER
First downs		
Total yards		
Rushing yards		
Passing yards		
Passing: Comp–Att–Int		
Time of possession		

Team	Category	Player	Statistics
Wofford	Passing		
Wofford	Rushing		
Wofford	Receiving		
Mercer	Passing		
Mercer	Rushing		
Mercer	Receiving		

=== at The Citadel ===
Mercer Bears (1-1) vs. The Citadel Bulldogs (1-2) – Game summary

Quarter	1	2	3	4	Total
Bears	10	7	7	14	38
Bulldogs	0	0	0	0	0

at Johnson Hagood Stadium • Charleston, SC

- Date: September 20
- Game time: 2:00 PM EDT
- Game weather: Sunny
- Game attendance: 11,339
- Referee: Bruce Austin
- TV announcers (ESPN+): Dave Weinstein (play-by-play), Vad Lee (analyst) and Matison Little (sideline)

Statistics	MER	CIT
First downs		
Total yards		
Rushing yards		
Passing yards		
Passing: Comp–Att–Int		
Time of possession		

Team	Category	Player	Statistics
Mercer	Passing		
Mercer	Rushing		
Mercer	Receiving		
The Citadel	Passing		
The Citadel	Rushing		
The Citadel	Receiving		

=== at East Tennessee State ===
Mercer Bears (2-1) vs. East Tennessee State Buccaneers (2-2) – Game summary

Quarter	1	2	3	4	Total
Bears	3	14	7	14	38
Buccaneers	10	17	7	0	34

at William B. Greene Jr. Stadium • Johnson City, TN

- Date: September 27
- Game time: 5:30 p.m. EDT
- Game weather: Cloudy • Temperature: 72 °F (22 °C) • Wind: E at 6 miles per hour (9.7 km/h)
- Game attendance: 10,567
- Referee: Jason Graham
- TV announcers (ESPN+): Keith Brake (play-by-play), Mark Hutsell (analyst) and Kennedy Story (sideline)

Game information

First Quarter

- (10:09) MER – Reice Griffith 49-yard field goal (Drive: 5 plays, 18 yards, 0:56; Mercer 3–0)
- (8:59) ETSU – Hakeem Meggett 14-yard pass from Cade McNamara, Ewan Johnson kick (Drive: 3 plays, 71 yards, 1:03; East Tennessee State 7–3)
- (1:41) ETSU – Ewan Johnson 21-yard field goal (Drive: 15 plays, 71 yards, 5:44; East Tennessee State 10–3)

Second Quarter

- (11:10) MER – Adonis McDaniel 3-yard pass from Braden Atkinson, Reice Griffith kick (Drive: 11 plays, 75 yards, 5:31; Tied 10–10)
- (7:52) ETSU – Charlie Browder 20-yard pass from Cade McNamara, Ewan Johnson kick (Drive: 8 plays, 86 yards, 3:12; East Tennessee State 17–10)
- (5:54) MER – Adjatay Dabbs 29-yard pass from Braden Atkinson, Reice Griffith kick (Drive: 4 plays, 75 yards, 1:58; Tied 17–17)
- (1:28) ETSU – Hakeem Meggett 35-yard pass from Cade McNamara, Ewan Johnson kick (Drive: 11 plays, 75 yards, 4:26; East Tennessee State 24–17)
- (0:00) ETSU – Ewan Johnson 32-yard field goal (Drive: 6 plays, 16 yards, 0:26; East Tennessee State 27–17)

Third Quarter

- (7:42) MER – CJ Miller 1-yard run, Reice Griffith kick (Drive: 9 plays, 61 yards, 5:11; East Tennessee State 27–24)
- (5:29) ETSU – Hakeem Meggett 22-yard pass from Cade McNamara, Ewan Johnson kick (Drive: 6 plays, 75 yards, 2:13; East Tennessee State 34–24)

Fourth Quarter

- (11:29) MER – Brayden Smith 17-yard pass from Braden Atkinson, Reice Griffith kick (Drive: 10 plays, 46 yards, 4:54; East Tennessee State 34–31)
- (5:40) MER – CJ Miller 1-yard run, Reice Griffith kick (Drive: 8 plays, 65 yards, 4:22; Mercer 38–34)

Statistics	MER	ETSU
First downs	22	33
Total yards	421	467
Rushing yards	234	69
Passing yards	187	398
Passing: Comp–Att–Int	18–26–1	29–47–2
Time of possession	33:15	26:45

Team	Category	Player	Statistics
Mercer	Passing	Braden Atkinson	18/26, 187 yards, 3 TD, INT
Mercer	Rushing	CJ Miller	29 carries, 172 yards, 2 TD
Mercer	Receiving	Adjatay Dabbs	3 receptions, 76 yards, TD
East Tennessee State	Passing	Cade McNamara	29/46, 398 yards, 4 TD, 2 INT
East Tennessee State	Rushing	Jason Albritton	14 carries, 39 yards
East Tennessee State	Receiving	Hakeem Meggett	5 receptions, 119 yards, 3 TD

=== Samford ===
Samford Bulldogs (0-5) vs. Mercer Bears (3-1) – Game summary

Quarter	1	2	3	4	Total
Bulldogs	0	0	14	7	21
Bears	14	14	14	3	45

at Five Star Stadium • Macon, GA

- Date: October 4
- Game time: 4:00 p.m. EDT
- Game weather: Cloudy • Temperature: 79 °F (26 °C) • Wind: NE at 9 miles per hour (14 km/h)
- Game attendance: 9,461
- Referee: Jeff Page
- TV announcers (ESPN+): Frank Malloy (play-by-play) and Phil Cox (analyst)

Game information

First Quarter

- (12:18) MER – Samuel Albee 64-yard pass from Braden Atkinson, Reice Griffith kick (Drive: 1 play, 64 yards, 0:09; Mercer 7–0)
- (2:36) MER – Antonio Butts Jr. 1-yard run, Reice Griffith kick (Drive: 6 plays, 48 yards, 2:37; Mercer 14–0)

Second Quarter

- (11:09) MER – Javarius George 3-yard pass from Braden Atkinson, Reice Griffith kick (Drive: 13 plays, 97 yards, 5:36; Mercer 21–0)
- (6:00) MER – Brayden Smith 7-yard pass from Braden Atkinson, Reice Griffith kick (Drive: 9 plays, 63 yards, 4:01; Mercer 28–0)

Third Quarter

- (12:50) SAM – Preston Bird 63-yard pass from Brady Stober, Jake Garner kick (Drive: 7 plays, 75 yards, 2:10; Mercer 28–7)
- (10:57) MER – Brayden Smith 38-yard pass from Braden Atkinson, Reice Griffith kick (Drive: 5 plays, 76 yards, 1:47; Mercer 35–7)
- (5:30) MER – Ty Doughty 66-yard pass from Braden Atkinson, Reice Griffith kick (Drive: 1 play, 66 yards, 0:10; Mercer 42–7)
- (2:44) SAM – Cameron Bland 13-yard run, Jake Garner kick (Drive: 9 plays, 75 yards, 2:46; Mercer 42–14)

Fourth Quarter

- (11:29) SAM – Samuel Pickett III 77-yard pass from Brady Stober, Jake Garner kick (Drive: 3 plays, 74 yards, 0:27; Mercer 42–21)
- (5:36) MER – Reice Griffith 34-yard field goal (Drive: 4 plays, 1 yard, 1:26; Mercer 45–21)

Statistics	SAM	MER
First downs	14	24
Total yards	342	557
Rushing yards	61	192
Passing yards	281	365
Passing: Comp–Att–Int	22–33–1	22–37–1
Time of possession	28:19	31:41

Team	Category	Player	Statistics
Samford	Passing	Brady Stober	14/22, 234 yards, 2 TD, INT
Samford	Rushing	Cameron Bland	11 carries, 52 yards, TD
Samford	Receiving	Samuel Pickett III	3 receptions, 112 yards, TD
Mercer	Passing	Braden Atkinson	22/35, 365 yards, 5 TD
Mercer	Rushing	Ty Doughty	19 carries, 105 yards
Mercer	Receiving	Ty Doughty	2 receptions, 77 yards, TD

=== at Princeton ===
No. 25 Mercer Bears (4-1) vs. Princeton Tigers (2-1) – Game summary

Quarter	1	2	3	4	Total
No. 25 Bears	14	7	14	3	38
Tigers	0	7	0	7	14

at Princeton Stadium • Princeton, NJ

- Date: October 11
- Game time: 1:00 p.m. EDT
- Game weather: Sunny • Wind: SW at 5 miles per hour (8.0 km/h)
- Game attendance: 2,970
- Referee: Henry Wimberg
- TV announcers (ESPN+): Cody Chrusciel (play-by-play), Dave Giancola (analyst) and Steven Cusumano (sideline)

Game information

First Quarter

- (9:31) MER – Malik Simmons 2-yard pass from Braden Atkinson, Reice Griffith kick (Drive: 13 plays, 72 yards, 5:29; Mercer 7–0)
- (1:11) MER – CJ Miller 5-yard run, Reice Griffith kick (Drive: 9 plays, 47 yards, 4:20; Mercer 14–0)

Second Quarter

- (7:49) MER – Samuel Albee 23-yard pass from Braden Atkinson, Reice Griffith kick (Drive: 3 plays, 84 yards, 0:58; Mercer 21–0)
- (0:33) PRIN – Aidan Besselman 2-yard pass from Kai Colón, Esteban Nunez Perez kick (Drive: 6 plays, 43 yards, 2:56; Mercer 21–7)

Third Quarter

- (10:33) MER – Brayden Smith 10-yard pass from Braden Atkinson, Reice Griffith kick (Drive: 7 plays, 46 yards, 2:56; Mercer 28–7)
- (4:39) MER – Adjatay Dabbs 10-yard run, Reice Griffith kick (Drive: 7 plays, 81 yards, 3:48; Mercer 35–7)

Fourth Quarter

- (14:04) MER – Reice Griffith 30-yard field goal (Drive: 7 plays, 52 yards, 1:23; Mercer 38–7)
- (8:54) PRIN – Jackson Green 11-yard pass from Kai Colón, Esteban Nunez Perez kick (Drive: 11 plays, 75 yards, 5:10; Mercer 38–14)

Statistics	MER	PRIN
First downs	28	18
Total yards	503	257
Rushing yards	156	66
Passing yards	347	191
Passing: Comp–Att–Int	27–42–1	18–34–0
Time of possession	31:43	28:17

Team	Category	Player	Statistics
Mercer	Passing	Braden Atkinson	27/42, 347 yards, 3 TD, INT
Mercer	Rushing	Tyrell Coard	7 carries, 54 yards
Mercer	Receiving	Adjatay Dabbs	3 receptions, 78 yards
Princeton	Passing	Kai Colón	13/21, 124 yards, 2 TD
Princeton	Rushing	Kai Honda	8 carries, 39 yards
Princeton	Receiving	Josh Robinson	6 receptions, 60 yards

=== VMI ===
VMI Keydets (1-6) vs. No. 17 Mercer Bears (5-1) – Game summary

Quarter	1	2	3	4	Total
Keydets	0	0	0	0	0
No. 17 Bears	31	10	7	14	62

at Five Star Stadium • Macon, GA

- Date: October 25
- Game time: 3:00 p.m. EDT
- Game weather: Sunny • Temperature: 76 °F (24 °C) • Wind: E at 8 miles per hour (13 km/h)
- Game attendance: 7,009
- Referee: Michael Farmer
- TV announcers (ESPN+): Frank Malloy (play-by-play) and Phil Cox (analyst)
- Box Score

Game information

First Quarter

- (14:50) MER – Brayden Smith 2-yard pass from Braden Atkinson, Reice Griffith kick (Drive: 1 play, 75 yards, 0:10; Mercer 7–0)
- (10:28) MER – Brayden Smith 32-yard pass from Braden Atkinson, Reice Griffith kick (Drive: 5 plays, 80 yards, 1:57; Mercer 14–0)
- (7:46) MER – CJ Miller 59-yard pass from Braden Atkinson, Reice Griffith kick (Drive: 5 plays, 80 yards, 1:54; Mercer 21–0)
- (2:56) MER – Reice Griffith 25-yard field goal (Drive: 8 plays, 60 yards, 3:39; Mercer 24–0)
- (1:39) MER – CJ Miller 75-yard run, Reice Griffith kick (Drive: 1 play, 75 yards, 0:13; Mercer 31–0)

Second Quarter

- (4:22) MER – Adjatay Dabbs 84-yard pass from Braden Atkinson, Reice Griffith kick (Drive: 2 plays, 86 yards, 0:43; Mercer 38–0)
- (0:00) MER – Reice Griffith 50-yard field goal (Drive: 6 plays, 46 yards, 0:54; Mercer 41–0)

Third Quarter

- (0:53) MER – Adonis McDaniel 51-yard pass from Braden Atkinson, Reice Griffith kick (Drive: 4 plays, 76 yards, 1:45; Mercer 48–0)

Fourth Quarter

- (8:16) MER – Ty Doughty 15-yard run, Reice Griffith kick (Drive: 10 plays, 94 yards, 5:50; Mercer 55–0)
- (3:52) MER – Carlos Benjamin 58-yard run, Reice Griffith kick (Drive: 5 plays, 73 yards, 3:01; Mercer 62–0)

Statistics	VMI	MER
First downs	7	30
Total yards	155	829
Rushing yards	50	248
Passing yards	105	581
Passing: Comp–Att–Int	11–29–0	33–39–0
Time of possession	25:47	34:13

Team	Category	Player	Statistics
VMI	Passing	Collin Shannon	10/25, 104 yards
VMI	Rushing	Aslin Shipe	8 carries, 57 yards
VMI	Receiving	Owen Sweeney	3 receptions, 56 yards
Mercer	Passing	Braden Atkinson	29/35, 533 yards, 5 TD
Mercer	Rushing	CJ Miller	9 carries, 102 yards, TD
Mercer	Receiving	Brayden Smith	9 receptions, 150 yards, 2 TD

=== at Furman ===
No. 15 Mercer Bears (6-1) vs. Furman Paladins (5-3) – Game summary

Quarter	1	2	3	4	Total
No. 15 Bears	7	17	21	7	52
Paladins	13	0	15	0	28

at Paladin Stadium • Greenville, SC

- Date: November 1
- Game time: 2:00 p.m. EDT
- Game weather: Sunny • Temperature: 62 °F (17 °C) • Wind: S at 3 miles per hour (4.8 km/h)
- Game attendance: 7,867
- Referee: Jason Graham
- TV announcers (ESPN+): Dan Scott (play-by-play), David Cobb (analyst) and Tom Van Hoy (sideline)

Game information

First Quarter

- (11:32) FUR - Evan James 14-yard pass from Trey Hedden, Jayquan Smith rush failed (Drive: 3 plays, 20 yards, 1:20; Furman 6-0)
- (7:33) FUR - CJ Nettles 67-yard run, Ian Williams kick (Drive: 3 plays, 85 yards, 4:52; Furman 13-0)
- (2:34) MER - Malik Simmons 21-yard pass from Braden Atkinson, Reice Griffith kick (Drive: 12 plays, 88 yards, 4:52; Furman 13-7)

Second Quarter

- (13:14) MER - CJ Miller 18-yard pass from Braden Atkinson, Reice Griffith kick (Drive: 8 plays, 72 yards, 2:25; Mercer 14-13)
- (6:45) MER - CJ Miller 6-yard run, Reice Griffith kick (Drive: 11 plays, 73 yards, 4:18; Mercer 21-13)
- (1:09) MER - Reice Griffith 44-yard field goal (Drive: 7 plays, 34 yards, 1:10; Mercer 24-13)

Third Quarter

- (14:47) FUR - Caleb Easterling 100-yard kickoff return, Ian Williams kick (Mercer 21-16)
- (13:34) MER - Adjatay Dabbs 63-yard pass from Braden Atkinson, Reice Griffith kick (Drive: 3 plays, 75 yards, 1:13; Mercer 28-16)
- (12:41) FUR - Ja'Keith Hamilton 64-yard pass from Trey Hedden, Kerry King pass (Drive: 3 plays, 66 yards, 0:48; Mercer 31-28)
- (8:45) MER - Braden Atkinson 1-yard run, Reice Griffith kick (Drive: 7 plays, 79 yards, 3:52; Mercer 38-28)
- (5:46) MER - CJ Miller 1-yard run, Reice Griffith kick (Drive: 3 plays, 45 yards, 0:47; Mercer 45-28)

Fourth Quarter

- (13:43) MER - Adonis McDaniel 37-yard pass from Braden Atkinson, Reice Griffith kick (Drive: 12 plays, 85 yards, 5:21; Mercer 52-28)

Statistics	MER	FUR
First downs	36	8
Total yards	628	227
Rushing yards	202	72
Passing yards	426	155
Passing: Comp–Att–Int	28-49-0	12-18-1
Time of possession	37:59	22:01

Team	Category	Player	Statistics
Mercer	Passing	Braden Atkinson	28/49, 426 yards, 4 TD
Mercer	Rushing	CJ Miller	20 carries, 111 yards, 2 TD
Mercer	Receiving	Adonis McDaniel	7 receptions, 139 yards, TD
Furman	Passing	Trey Hedden	12/18, 155 yards, 2 TD, INT
Furman	Rushing	CJ Nettles	15 carries, 105 yards, TD
Furman	Receiving	Ja'Keith Hamilton	1 reception, 64 yards, TD

=== at No. 24 Western Carolina ===
No. 12 Mercer Bears (7-1) vs. No. 24 Western Carolina Catamounts (6-3) – Game summary

Quarter	1	2	3	4	Total
No. 12 Bears	7	11	21	10	49
No. 24 Catamounts	7	14	6	20	47

at Bob Waters Field at E. J. Whitmire Stadium • Cullowhee, NC

- Date: November 8
- Game time: 2:30 p.m. EST
- Game weather: Cloudy • Temperature: 65 °F (18 °C) • Wind: NW at 5 miles per hour (8.0 km/h)
- Game attendance: 14,510
- Referee: Jake Grombach
- TV announcers (ESPN+): Daniel Hooker (play-by-play) and John Brannon III (analyst)

Game information

First Quarter

- (11:40) WCU – Michael Rossin 27-yard pass from Taron Dickens, Marcus Trout kick (Drive: 9 plays, 65 yards, 3:20; Western Carolina 7–0)
- (3:31) MER – CJ Miller 7-yard run, Reice Griffith kick (Drive: 5 plays, 68 yards, 2:24; Tied 7–7)

Second Quarter

- (14:55) WCU – Patrick Boyd Jr. 21-yard pass from Taron Dickens, Marcus Trout kick (Drive: 6 plays, 54 yards, 1:36; Western Carolina 14–7)
- (13:06) MER – Jordan Swain safety (Western Carolina 14–9)
- (10:18) MER – Kendall Harris 6-yard pass from Braden Atkinson (Drive: 7 plays, 69 yards, 2:42; Mercer 15–14)
- (5:25) WCU – Michael Rossin 25-yard pass from Taron Dickens, Marcus Trout kick (Drive: 11 plays, 79 yards, 4:48; Western Carolina 21–15)
- (1:43) MER – Reice Griffith 24-yard field goal (Drive: 10 plays, 68 yards, 3:42; Western Carolina 21–18)

Third Quarter

- (12:09) MER – CJ Miller 5-yard run, Reice Griffith kick (Drive: 5 plays, 75 yards, 2:51; Mercer 25–21)
- (5:12) MER – Kendall Harris 24-yard pass from Braden Atkinson, Reice Griffith kick (Drive: 4 plays, 35 yards, 1:31; Mercer 32–21)
- (2:56) WCU – Malik Knight 32-yard pass from Taron Dickens (Drive: 6 plays, 75 yards, 2:16; Mercer 32–27)
- (0:24) MER – CJ Miller 26-yard run, Reice Griffith kick (Drive: 6 plays, 75 yards, 2:32; Mercer 39–27)

Fourth Quarter

- (14:28) WCU – Malik Knight 54-yard pass from Taron Dickens, Marcus Trout kick (Drive: 3 plays, 64 yards, 0:49; Mercer 39–34)
- (13:24) MER – Adjatay Dabbs 81-yard pass from Braden Atkinson, Reice Griffith kick (Drive: 3 plays, 82 yards, 0:58; Mercer 46–34)
- (6:13) WCU – Jai Boyd 10-yard pass from Taron Dickens, Marcus Trout kick (Drive: 8 plays, 73 yards, 2:43; Mercer 46–41)
- (3:13) WCU – James Tyre 42-yard pass from Taron Dickens (Drive: 3 plays, 82 yards, 1:23; Western Carolina 47–46)
- (1:30) MER – Reice Griffith 37-yard field goal (Drive: 6 plays, 45 yards, 1:43; Mercer 49–47)

Statistics	MER	WCU
First downs	23	33
Total yards	568	599
Rushing yards	125	48
Passing yards	443	551
Passing: Comp–Att–Int	23–39–0	33–49–1
Time of possession	30:32	29:28

Team	Category	Player	Statistics
Mercer	Passing	Braden Atkinson	23/39, 443 yards, 3 TD
Mercer	Rushing	CJ Miller	21 carries, 91 yards, 3 TD
Mercer	Receiving	Adjatay Dabbs	4 receptions, 147 yards, TD
Western Carolina	Passing	Taron Dickens	33/49, 551 yards, 7 TD, INT
Western Carolina	Rushing	Patrick Boyd Jr.	12 carries, 17 yards
Western Carolina	Receiving	Malik Knight	5 receptions, 141 yards, 2 TD

=== Chattanooga ===
Chattanooga Mocs (5-5) vs. No. 8 Mercer Bears (8-1) – Game summary

Quarter	1	2	3	4	Total
Mocs	3	0	0	14	17
No. 8 Bears	21	14	21	7	63

at Five Star Stadium • Macon, GA

- Date: November 15
- Game time: 3:00 PM EST
- TV: ESPN+

Statistics	UTC	MER
First downs	12	32
Total yards	198	545
Rushing yards	138	333
Passing yards	60	212
Passing: Comp–Att–Int	11–25–2	29–38–1
Time of possession	29:55	30:05

Team	Category	Player	Statistics
Chattanooga	Passing	Battle Alberson	11/25, 138 yards, TD, 2 INT
Chattanooga	Rushing	Journey Wyche	11 carries, 44 yards
Chattanooga	Receiving	Markell Quick	3 receptions, 75 yards, TD
Mercer	Passing	Braden Atkinson	28/37, 326 yards, 5 TD, INT
Mercer	Rushing	CJ Miller	14 carries, 91 yards, 2 TD
Mercer	Receiving	Adonis McDaniel	6 receptions, 68 yards, TD

=== at Auburn (FBS) ===
No. 7 Mercer Bears (9-1) vs. Auburn Tigers (FBS) (4-6) – Game summary

Quarter	1	2	3	4	Total
No. 7 Bears	14	3	0	0	17
Tigers (FBS)	14	21	14	13	62

at Jordan–Hare Stadium • Auburn, AL

- Date: November 22
- Game time: 1:00 PM CST
- Game weather: Cloudy • Temperature: 75 °F (24 °C) • Wind: W 9 mph
- Game attendance: 88,043
- Referee: James Carter
- TV announcers (SECN+/ESPN+): Richard Cross (play-by-play) and Charles Arbuckle (analyst)

Game information

First quarter

- AUB – Deuce Knight 75-yard run (Alex McPherson kick), 14:45. Tigers 7–0. Drive: 1 play, 75 yards, 0:15.
- MER – CJ Miller 1-yard run (Reice Griffith kick), 10:52. Tied 7–7. Drive: 8 plays, 75 yards, 3:53.
- MER – Adjatay Dabbs 8-yard pass from Braden Atkinson (Reice Griffith kick), 2:59. Bears 14–7. Drive: 13 plays, 70 yards, 6:08.
- AUB – Deuce Knight 51-yard run (Alex McPherson kick), 0:28. Tied 14–14. Drive: 8 plays, 75 yards, 2:31.

Second quarter

- AUB – Deuce Knight 9-yard run (Alex McPherson kick), 8:00. Tigers 21–14. Drive: 10 plays, 80 yards, 3:53.
- MER – Reice Griffith 41-yard field goal, 4:09. Tigers 21–17. Drive: 10 plays, 51 yards, 3:51.
- AUB – Deuce Knight 20-yard run (Alex McPherson kick), 1:15. Tigers 28–17. Drive: 9 plays, 65 yards, 2:54.
- AUB – Cam Coleman 10-yard pass from Deuce Knight (Alex McPherson kick), 0:03. Tigers 35–17. Drive: 4 plays, 33 yards, 0:25.

Third quarter

- AUB – Elijah Menendez 41-yard interception return (Alex McPherson kick), 11:46. Tigers 42–17.
- AUB – Malcolm Simmons 91-yard pass from Deuce Knight (Alex McPherson kick), 8:08. Tigers 49–17. Drive: 1 play, 91 yards, 0:15.

Fourth quarter

- AUB – Alex McPherson 47-yard field goal, 12:03. Tigers 52–17. Drive: 7 plays, 19 yards, 3:28.
- AUB – Alex McPherson 49-yard field goal, 8:24. Tigers 55–17. Drive: 4 plays, -12 yards, 2:16.
- AUB – Jackson Arnold 56-yard run (Alex McPherson kick), 5:11. Tigers 62–17. Drive: 3 plays, 67 yards, 1:35.

Statistics	MER	AUB
First downs	19	21
Plays–yards	77–338	56–547
Rushing yards	115	277
Passing yards	223	270
Passing: Comp–Att–Int	21–36–2	18–25–0
Turnovers	3	0
Time of possession	37:20	22:40

Team	Category	Player	Statistics
Mercer	Passing	Braden Atkinson	20/33, 210 yards, TD, 2 INT
Mercer	Rushing	CJ Miller	14 carries, 38 yards, TD
Mercer	Receiving	Adjatay Dabbs	6 receptions, 74 yards, TD
Auburn	Passing	Deuce Knight	15/20, 239 yards, 2 TD
Auburn	Rushing	Deuce Knight	9 carries, 162 yards, 4 TD
Auburn	Receiving	Malcolm Simmons	5 receptions, 149 yards, TD

=== No. 12 South Dakota ===
2025 NCAA Division I FCS Playoffs Second Round
No. 12 South Dakota (9-4) at No. 7 Mercer Bears (9-2) – Game summary

Quarter	1	2	3	4	Total
No. 11 Coyotes	14	10	16	7	47
No. 7 Bears	0	0	0	0	0

at Five Star Stadium • Macon, GA

- Date: December 6
- Game time: 12:00 PM EST
- Game weather: Rain • Temperature: 49 °F (9 °C) • Wind: W 6 mph
- Game attendance: 3,042
- Referee: James Brookhart
- TV announcers (ESPN+): Kelsie Kasper (play-by-play) and Forrest Conoly (analyst)

Game information

First Quarter

- (9:13) SDAK – Reid Watkins 8-yard run, Will Leyland kick (Drive: 7 plays, 80 yards, 3:18; South Dakota 7–0)
- (3:58) SDAK – L.J. Phillips Jr. 16-yard run, Will Leyland kick (Drive: 7 plays, 47 yards, 4:03; South Dakota 14–0)

Second Quarter

- (8:18) SDAK – L.J. Phillips Jr. 15-yard run, Will Leyland kick (Drive: 5 plays, 80 yards, 3:20; South Dakota 21–0)
- (3:07) SDAK – Will Leyland 40-yard field goal (Drive: 7 plays, 42 yards, 3:13; South Dakota 24–0)

Third Quarter

- (14:03) SDAK – Larenzo Fenner 66-yard pass from Aidan Bouman, Will Leyland kick (Drive: 3 plays, 68 yards, 0:51; South Dakota 31–0)
- (10:41) SDAK – Tysen Boze 63-yard pass from Aidan Bouman, Will Leyland kick (Drive: 1 play, 63 yards, 0:11; South Dakota 38–0)
- (1:34) SDAK – Safety (South Dakota 40–0)

Fourth Quarter

- (9:27) SDAK – Tennel Bryant 26-yard run, Will Leyland kick (Drive: 6 plays, 42 yards, 3:32; South Dakota 47–0)

Statistics	SDAK	MER
First downs	20	20
Total yards	549	277
Rushing yards	308	129
Passing yards	241	148
Passing: Comp–Att–Int	13–18–0	18–39–4
Time of possession	31:28	28:32

Team	Category	Player	Statistics
South Dakota	Passing	Aidan Bouman	13/18, 241 yards, 2 TD
South Dakota	Rushing	L.J. Phillips Jr.	15 rushes, 159 yards, 2 TD
South Dakota	Receiving	Tysen Boze	2 receptions, 108 yards, TD
Mercer	Passing	Braden Atkinson	18/39, 148 yards, 4 INT
Mercer	Rushing	CJ Miller	18 rushes, 105 yards
Mercer	Receiving	Travion Solomon	4 receptions, 52 yards

== Ranking movements ==
Ranking movements Legend: ██ Increase in ranking ██ Decrease in ranking RV = Received votes т = Tied with team above or below
	Week														
Poll	Pre	1	2	3	4	5	6	7	8	9	10	11	12	13	Final
STATS FCS	11	23	RV	RV	RV	RV	25	24	17	15	12	8	7	7	17
Coaches	11	21	22	25	23	22	19	16	16	13	10т	8	6	8	18
