= 2025 Samford Bulldogs football team =

American college football season

2025 Samford Bulldogs football
- Conference: Southern Conference
- Record: 1–11 (1–7 SoCon)
- Head coach: Chris Hatcher (11th season; first 10 games); Scot Sloan (interim; remainder of season)
- Offensive coordinator: Ricky Turner (4th season)
- Offensive scheme: Spread
- Defensive coordinator: Scot Sloan (1st season)
- Base defense: 3–4
- Home stadium: Pete Hanna Stadium

2025 Southern Conference football standings
	Conf.			Overall
Team	W		L	W		L
No. 17 Mercer $^	8	–	0	9	–	3
Western Carolina	6	–	2	7	–	5
East Tennessee State	5	–	3	7	–	5
Wofford	5	–	3	6	–	6
Chattanooga	4	–	4	5	–	7
Furman	4	–	4	6	–	6
The Citadel	3	–	5	4	–	8
Samford	1	–	7	1	–	11
VMI	0	–	8	1	–	11
$ – Conference champion; ^ – FCS playoff participant; Rankings from STATS Poll

The 2025 Samford Bulldogs football team represented Samford University as a member of the Southern Conference (SoCon) during the 2025 NCAA Division I FCS football season. The Bulldogs played their home games at Pete Hanna Stadium in Homewood, Alabama.

The Bulldogs were led by eleventh-year head coach Chris Hatcher for the first ten games of the season. Hatcher was fired on November 9 with the team sitting at a 1–9 record; Hatcher finished his tenure at Samford with an overall record of 62–59. Defensive coordinator Scot Sloan was named interim head coach for the final two games of the season.

== Schedule ==
Date	Time	Opponent	Site	TV	Result	Attendance
August 28	6:30 p.m.	West Georgia*	Pete Hanna Stadium; Homewood, AL	ESPN+	L 3–34	506
September 6	2:30 p.m.	The Citadel	Pete Hanna Stadium; Homewood, AL	ESPN+	L 13–40	4,017
September 13	11:00 a.m.	at Baylor*	McLane Stadium; Waco, TX	ESPN+	L 7–42	41,215
September 20	1:30 p.m.	at Western Carolina	Bob Waters Field at E. J. Whitmire Stadium; Cullowhee, NC	ESPN+	L 35–50	10,593
September 27	2:30 p.m.	Furman	Pete Hanna Stadium; Homewood, AL	ESPN+	L 13–31	7,521
October 4	3:00 p.m.	at Mercer	Five Star Stadium; Macon, GA	ESPN+	L 21–45	9,461
October 18	12:30 p.m.	at VMI	Alumni Memorial Field; Lexington, VA	ESPN+	W 24–22	5,294
October 25	2:30 p.m.	Chattanooga	Pete Hanna Stadium; Homewood, AL	ESPN+	L 13–49	3,741
November 1	12:30 p.m.	at Wofford	Gibbs Stadium; Spartanburg, SC	ESPN+	L 16–26	4,985
November 8	2:30 p.m.	East Tennessee State^{†}	Pete Hanna Stadium; Homewood, AL	ESPN+	L 14–38	3,591
November 15	1:00 p.m.	at Austin Peay*	Fortera Stadium; Clarksville, TN	ESPN+	L 16–30	6,751
November 22	11:00 a.m.	at No. 3 (FBS) Texas A&M*	Kyle Field; College Station, TX	SECN+	L 0–48	104,877
*Non-conference game; ^{†}Homecoming; Rankings from STATS Poll released prior to the game; All times are in Central time

== Game summaries ==
=== West Georgia ===
West Georgia Wolves (0-0) at Samford Bulldogs (0-0) – Game summary

Quarter	1	2	3	4	Total
Wolves	10	0	7	17	34
Bulldogs	0	0	0	3	3

at Pete Hanna Stadium • Homewood, AL

- Date: August 28
- Game time: 6:30 p.m. CDT
- Game weather: Sunny • Temperature: 76 °F (24 °C)
- Game attendance: 506
- Referee: Bruce Austin
- TV announcers (ESPN+): Pete Yannity (play-by-play), Jay Songhalter (analyst) and Dave Friedman (sideline)

Game information

First quarter

- UWG – Tommy Holden 23-yard field goal, 9:00. Wolves 3–0. Drive: 4 plays, 4 yards, 2:04.
- UWG – Davin Wydner 1-yard run (Tommy Holden kick), 3:04. Wolves 10–0. Drive: 11 plays, 70 yards, 5:14.

Second quarter

No scoring plays.

Third quarter

- UWG – DeAndre Buchannon 92-yard kickoff return (Tommy Holden kick), 14:47. Wolves 17–0.

Fourth quarter

- UWG – TJ Lester 3-yard run (Tommy Holden kick), 13:43. Wolves 24–0. Drive: 3 plays, 69 yards, 1:05.
- UWG – Tommy Holden 49-yard field goal, 7:06. Wolves 27–0. Drive: 11 plays, 42 yards, 4:03.
- SAM – Ty Ippolito 36-yard field goal, 4:15. Wolves 27–3. Drive: 12 plays, 57 yards, 2:51.
- UWG – Geoffrey Speight 50-yard fumble return (Tommy Holden kick), 1:46. Wolves 34–3.

Statistics	UWG	SAM
First downs	18	16
Total yards	411	271
Rushing yards	180	24
Passing yards	231	247
Passing: Comp–Att–Int	19–35–2	32–44–0
Time of possession	32:11	27:49

Team	Category	Player	Statistics
West Georgia	Passing	Davin Wydner	18/34, 209 yards, 2 INT
West Georgia	Rushing	Latrelle Murrell	11 carries, 129 yards
West Georgia	Receiving	Owen Dupree	7 receptions, 71 yards
Samford	Passing	Quincy Crittendon	22/29, 154 yards
Samford	Rushing	C.J. Evans	7 carries, 23 yards
Samford	Receiving	Preston Bird	11 receptions, 95 yards

=== The Citadel ===
The Citadel Bulldogs (0-1) at Samford Bulldogs (0-1) – Game summary

Quarter	1	2	3	4	Total
The Citadel	0	10	10	20	40
Samford	0	6	0	7	13

at Pete Hanna Stadium • Homewood, AL

- Date: September 6
- Game time: 2:30 PM CDT
- Game weather: Cloud • Temperature: 83 °F (28 °C)
- Game attendance: 4,017
- Referee: Michael Farmer
- TV announcers (ESPN+): Blake Gardner (play-by-play), Damian Mitchell (analyst) and Christina Chambers (sideline)

Game information

First Quarter

No scoring

Second Quarter

- (14:46) SAM – Jake Garner 40-yard field goal (Drive: 7 plays, 13 yards, 1:17; Samford 3–0)
- (8:34) SAM – Jake Garner 20-yard field goal (Drive: 12 plays, 60 yards, 4:25; Samford 6–0)
- (6:03) CIT – Javonte Graves-Billups 43-yard pass from Cobey Thompkins, Ben Barnes kick (Drive: 5 plays, 75 yards, 2:31; The Citadel 7–6)
- (0:03) CIT – Ben Barnes 40-yard field goal (Drive: 7 plays, 57 yards, 0:36; The Citadel 10–6)

Third Quarter

- (11:21) CIT – Ben Barnes 28-yard field goal (Drive: 6 plays, 15 yards, 3:17; The Citadel 13–6)
- (3:03) CIT – Sayre Smothers 31-yard fumble recovery, Ben Barnes kick (The Citadel 20–6)

Fourth Quarter

- (13:48) CIT – Bradlee Jones 59-yard fumble recovery, Ben Barnes kick (The Citadel 27–6)
- (11:17) SAM – CJ Evans 5-yard run, Jake Garner kick (Drive: 8 plays, 75 yards, 2:31; The Citadel 27–13)
- (4:34) CIT – Javonte Graves-Billups 13-yard pass from Quentin Hayes, 2-pt conversion failed (Drive: 5 plays, 55 yards, 1:32; The Citadel 33–13)
- (1:45) CIT – Quentin Hayes 18-yard run, Jake Garner kick (Drive: 4 plays, 27 yards, 1:32; The Citadel 40–13)

Statistics	CIT	SAM
First downs	15	26
Total yards	330	452
Rushing yards	162	90
Passing yards	168	362
Passing: Comp–Att–Int	10–13–0	43–62–3
Time of possession	29:51	30:09

Team	Category	Player	Statistics
The Citadel	Passing	Cobey Thompkins	9/11, 155 yards, TD
The Citadel	Rushing	Cobey Thompkins	13 carries, 76 yards
The Citadel	Receiving	Javonte Graves-Billips	6 receptions, 139 yards, 2 TD
Samford	Passing	Quincy Crittendon	40/56, 324 yards, 3 INT
Samford	Rushing	Quincy Crittendon	14 carries, 35 yards
Samford	Receiving	Jaden Gibson	10 receptions, 91 yards

=== at Baylor (FBS) ===
Samford Bulldogs (0–2) at Baylor Bears (FBS) (1–1) – Game summary

Quarter	1	2	3	4	Total
Bulldogs	7	0	0	0	7
Bears (FBS)	14	21	0	7	42

at McLane Stadium • Waco, TX

- Date: September 13
- Game time: 11:00 AM CDT
- Game weather: Sunny • Temperature: 85 °F (29 °C) • Wind: S at 9 miles per hour (14 km/h)
- Game attendance: 41,215
- Referee: Tutashinda Salaam
- TV announcers (ESPN+): James Westling (play-by-play), Leger Douzable (analyst) and Madison Hock (sideline)

Game information

First quarter

- (12:52) BAY – Bryson Washington 2 yard run, Connor Hawkins kick (Drive: 4 plays, 28 yards, 1:17; BAY 7–0)
- (09:37) BAY – Josh Cameron 10 yard pass from Sawyer Robertson, Connor Hawkins kick (Drive: 5 plays, 82 yards, 1:59; BAY 14–0)
- (01:07) SAM – Torrey Ward 12 yard pass from CJ Evans, Jake Garner kick (Drive: 10 plays, 80 yards, 4:00; BAY 14–7)

Second quarter

- (08:52) BAY – Kobe Prentice 12 yard pass from Sawyer Robertson, Connor Hawkins kick (Drive: 14 plays, 82 yards, 4:51; BAY 21–7)
- (04:22) BAY – Bryson Washington 5 yard run, Connor Hawkins kick (Drive: 8 plays, 34 yards, 3:23; BAY 28–7)
- (01:07) BAY – Caden Knighten 1 yard run, Connor Hawkins kick (Drive: 4 plays, 48 yards, 0:57; BAY 35–7)

Third quarter

- No scoring plays.

Fourth quarter

- (11:40) BAY – Louis Brown IV 11 yard pass from Sawyer Robertson, Connor Hawkins kick (Drive: 14 plays, 88 yards, 4:12; BAY 42–7)

Statistics	SAM	BAY
First downs	10	29
Plays–yards	58–195	87–468
Rushes–yards	33–95	43–223
Passing yards	100	245
Passing: comp–att–int	13–25–3	28–44–2
Turnovers	4	2
Time of possession	25:54	34:06

Team	Category	Player	Statistics
Samford	Passing	Quincy Crittendon	7/13, 59 yards, INT
Samford	Rushing	CJ Evans	13 carries, 53 yards
Samford	Receiving	Torrey Ward	5 receptions, 62 yards, TD
Baylor	Passing	Sawyer Robertson	23/37, 211 yards, 3 TD, 2 INT
Baylor	Rushing	Bryson Washington	21 carries, 135 yards, 2 TD
Baylor	Receiving	Ashtyn Hawkins	3 receptions, 42 yards

=== at Western Carolina ===
Samford Bulldogs (0-3) vs. Western Carolina Catamounts (0-3) – Game summary

Quarter	1	2	3	4	Total
Bulldogs	6	14	6	9	35
Catamounts	14	7	29	0	50

at Bob Waters Field at E. J. Whitmire Stadium • Cullowhee, NC

- Date: September 20
- Game time: 2:30 PM EDT
- Game weather: Sunny • Temperature: 79 °F (26 °C) • Wind: SE at 7 miles per hour (11 km/h)
- Game attendance: 10,593
- Referee: Brian Hilpisch
- TV announcers (ESPN+): Pete Yanity (play-by-play) and John Brannon III (analyst)

Game information

First quarter

- SAM – Jake Garner 28-yard field goal, 11:07. Bulldogs 3–0. Drive: 11 plays, 64 yards, 3:53.
- WCU – Camury Reid 14-yard pass from Taron Dickens (Marcus Trout kick), 8:26. Catamounts 7–3. Drive: 8 plays, 71 yards, 2:34.
- SAM – Jake Garner 29-yard field goal, 3:17. Catamounts 7–6. Drive: 13 plays, 68 yards, 5:05.
- WCU – James Tyre 6-yard pass from Taron Dickens (Marcus Trout kick), 1:06. Catamounts 14–6. Drive: 5 plays, 75 yards, 2:11.

Second quarter

- SAM – Calvin Jones 28-yard pass from Quincy Crittendon (Jake Garner kick), 13:12. Catamounts 14–13. Drive: 9 plays, 75 yards, 2:54.
- SAM – Calvin Jones 11-yard pass from Quincy Crittendon (Jake Garner kick), 9:36. Bulldogs 20–14. Drive: 6 plays, 66 yards, 1:50.
- WCU – Jordan Thomas 2-yard pass from Taron Dickens, 1:32. Catamounts 21–20. Drive: 8 plays, 58 yards, 2:01.

Third quarter

- WCU – Painter Richards-Baker 20-yard pass from Taron Dickens (Marcus Trout kick), 13:42. Catamounts 28–20. Drive: 4 plays, 48 yards, 1:11.
- SAM – Calvin Jones 12-yard pass from Quincy Crittendon (Kick failed), 11:08. Catamounts 28–26. Drive: 7 plays, 75 yards, 2:34.
- WCU – Camury Reid 24-yard pass from Taron Dickens (Taron Dickens pass), 8:22. Catamounts 36–26. Drive: 9 plays, 65 yards, 2:46.
- WCU – Camury Reid 2-yard run (Marcus Trout kick), 3:08. Catamounts 43–26. Drive: 8 plays, 80 yards, 2:31.
- WCU – Camury Reid 62-yard pass from Taron Dickens (Marcus Trout kick), 1:12. Catamounts 50–26. Drive: 3 plays, 70 yards, 0:37.

Fourth quarter

- SAM – C.J. Evans 32-yard run (Pass failed), 8:50. Catamounts 50–33. Drive: 8 plays, 91 yards, 2:56.
- SAM – Jake Garner 33-yard field goal, 1:56. Catamounts 50–36. Drive: 10 plays, 61 yards, 1:43.

Statistics	SAM	WCU
First downs	34	31
Total yards	576	733
Rushing yards	120	151
Passing yards	456	582
Passing: Comp–Att–Int	35–53–1	35–46–0
Time of possession	30:13	29:47

Team	Category	Player	Statistics
Samford	Passing	Quincy Crittendon	35/53, 456 yards, 3 TD, INT
Samford	Rushing	C.J. Evans	15 carries, 56 yards, TD
Samford	Receiving	Jaden Gibson	9 receptions, 122 yards
Western Carolina	Passing	Taron Dickens	35/46, 582 yards, 6 TD
Western Carolina	Rushing	Markel Townsend	13 carries, 56 yards
Western Carolina	Receiving	Camury Reid	4 receptions, 107 yards, 3 TD

=== Furman ===
Furman Paladins (2-1) vs. Samford Bulldogs (0-4) – Game summary

Quarter	1	2	3	4	Total
Paladins	14	7	10	0	31
Bulldogs	0	7	0	6	13

at Pete Hanna Stadium • Homewood, AL

- Date: September 27
- Game time: 2:30 PM CDT
- Game weather: Sunny • Temperature: 83 °F (28 °C) • Wind: N at 5 miles per hour (8.0 km/h)
- Game attendance: 7,521
- Referee: Jake Grombach
- TV announcers (ESPN+): Blake Gardner (play-by-play), Damian Mitchell (analyst) and Molly Robinson (sideline)

Game information

First Quarter

- (12:14) FUR – Evan James 17-yard run, Ian Williams kick (Drive: 9 plays, 82 yards, 2:43; Furman 7–0)
- (1:21) FUR – Joshua Burrell 7-yard pass from Trey Hedden, Ian Williams kick (Drive: 9 plays, 53 yards, 4:10; Furman 14–0)

Second Quarter

- (9:08) SAM – CJ Evans 25-yard pass from Quincy Crittendon, Ty Ippolito kick (Drive: 8 plays, 83 yards, 2:30; Furman 14–7)
- (0:48) FUR – Raleigh Herbert 47-yard interception, Ian Williams kick (Furman 21–7)

Third Quarter

- (10:37) FUR – Ja'Keith Hamilton 4-yard pass from Trey Hedden, Ian Williams kick (Drive: 5 plays, 50 yards, 2:33; Furman 28–7)
- (1:15) FUR – Ian Williams 40-yard field goal (Drive: 6 plays, 60 yards, 3:09; Furman 31–7)

Fourth Quarter

- (11:52) SAM – Preston Bird 70-yard pass from Quincy Crittendon (Drive: 3 plays, 80 yards, 0:56; Furman 31–13)

Statistics	FUR	SAM
First downs	17	23
Total yards	377	389
Rushing yards	105	70
Passing yards	272	319
Passing: Comp–Att–Int	28–41–0	32–47–2
Time of possession	34:53	25:07

Team	Category	Player	Statistics
Furman	Passing	Trey Hedden	28/41, 272 yards, 2 TD
Furman	Rushing	Gavin Hall	16 carries, 65 yards
Furman	Receiving	Evan James	7 receptions, 88 yards
Samford	Passing	Quincy Crittendon	28/42, 252 yards, 2 TD, INT
Samford	Rushing	Brady Stober	3 carries, 22 yards
Samford	Receiving	Preston Bird	5 receptions, 97 yards, TD

=== at Mercer ===
Samford Bulldogs (0-5) vs. Mercer Bears (3-1) – Game summary

Quarter	1	2	3	4	Total
Bulldogs	0	0	14	7	21
Bears	14	14	14	3	45

at Five Star Stadium • Macon, GA

- Date: October 4
- Game time: 4:00 PM EDT
- Game weather: Cloudy • Temperature: 79 °F (26 °C) • Wind: NE at 9 miles per hour (14 km/h)
- Game attendance: 9,461
- Referee: Jeff Page
- TV announcers (ESPN+): Frank Malloy (play-by-play) and Phil Cox (analyst)

Game information

First Quarter

- (12:18) MER – Samuel Albee 64-yard pass from Braden Atkinson, Reice Griffith kick (Drive: 1 play, 64 yards, 0:09; Mercer 7–0)
- (2:36) MER – Antonio Butts Jr. 1-yard run, Reice Griffith kick (Drive: 6 plays, 48 yards, 2:37; Mercer 14–0)

Second Quarter

- (11:09) MER – Javarius George 3-yard pass from Braden Atkinson, Reice Griffith kick (Drive: 13 plays, 97 yards, 5:36; Mercer 21–0)
- (6:00) MER – Brayden Smith 7-yard pass from Braden Atkinson, Reice Griffith kick (Drive: 9 plays, 63 yards, 4:01; Mercer 28–0)

Third Quarter

- (12:50) SAM – Preston Bird 63-yard pass from Brady Stober, Jake Garner kick (Drive: 7 plays, 75 yards, 2:10; Mercer 28–7)
- (10:57) MER – Brayden Smith 38-yard pass from Braden Atkinson, Reice Griffith kick (Drive: 5 plays, 76 yards, 1:47; Mercer 35–7)
- (5:30) MER – Ty Doughty 66-yard pass from Braden Atkinson, Reice Griffith kick (Drive: 1 play, 66 yards, 0:10; Mercer 42–7)
- (2:44) SAM – Cameron Bland 13-yard run, Jake Garner kick (Drive: 9 plays, 75 yards, 2:46; Mercer 42–14)

Fourth Quarter

- (11:29) SAM – Samuel Pickett III 77-yard pass from Brady Stober, Jake Garner kick (Drive: 3 plays, 74 yards, 0:27; Mercer 42–21)
- (5:36) MER – Reice Griffith 34-yard field goal (Drive: 4 plays, 1 yard, 1:26; Mercer 45–21)

Statistics	SAM	MER
First downs	14	24
Total yards	342	557
Rushing yards	61	192
Passing yards	281	365
Passing: Comp–Att–Int	22–33–1	22–37–1
Time of possession	28:19	31:41

Team	Category	Player	Statistics
Samford	Passing	Brady Stober	14/22, 234 yards, 2 TD, INT
Samford	Rushing	Cameron Bland	11 carries, 52 yards, TD
Samford	Receiving	Samuel Pickett III	3 receptions, 112 yards, TD
Mercer	Passing	Braden Atkinson	22/35, 365 yards, 5 TD
Mercer	Rushing	Ty Doughty	19 carries, 105 yards
Mercer	Receiving	Ty Doughty	2 receptions, 77 yards, TD

=== at VMI ===
Samford Bulldogs (0-6) vs. VMI Keydets (1-5) – Game summary

Quarter	1	2	3	4	Total
Bulldogs	7	14	0	3	24
Keydets	0	7	6	9	22

at Alumni Memorial Field • Lexington, VA

- Date: October 18
- Game time: 12:30 PM EDT
- Game weather: Sunny
- Game attendance: 5,294
- Referee: Brian Hilpisch
- TV announcers (ESPN+): Wade Branner (play-by-play) and Chip Tarkenton (analyst)

Game information

First Quarter

- (11:23) SAM – Calvin Jones 15-yard pass from Brady Stober, Jake Garner kick (Drive: 10 plays, 73 yards, 3:37; Samford 7–0)

Second Quarter

- (14:50) VMI – Owen Sweeney 55-yard pass from Collin Shannon, Ben Shrewsbury kick (Drive: 3 plays, 80 yards, 1:18; Tied 7–7)
- (11:50) SAM – Samuel Pickett III 22-yard pass from Brady Stober, Jake Garner kick (Drive: 6 plays, 75 yards, 3:00; Samford 14–7)
- (0:50) SAM – Preston Bird 27-yard pass from Brady Stober, Jake Garner kick (Drive: 4 plays, 64 yards, 0:52; Samford 21–7)

Third Quarter

- (12:20) VMI – Leo Boehling 37-yard run (Drive: 7 plays, 78 yards, 2:40; Samford 21–13)

Fourth Quarter

- (13:36) VMI – Ben Shrewsbury 24-yard field goal (Drive: 12 plays, 73 yards, 3:54; Samford 21–16)
- (7:24) VMI – Noah Grevious 10-yard pass from Collin Shannon (Drive: 4 plays, 88 yards, 2:15; VMI 22–21)
- (1:28) SAM – Jake Garner 37-yard field goal (Drive: 14 plays, 67 yards, 3:43; Samford 24–22)

Statistics	SAM	VMI
First downs	22	25
Total yards	398	522
Rushing yards	113	103
Passing yards	285	419
Passing: Comp–Att–Int	34–43–1	24–38–1
Time of possession	29:14	30:46

Team	Category	Player	Statistics
Samford	Passing	Brady Stober	34/43, 285 yards, 3 TD, INT
Samford	Rushing	Brady Stober	13 carries, 45 yards
Samford	Receiving	Preston Bird	9 receptions, 116 yards, TD
VMI	Passing	Collin Shannon	24/38, 419 yards, 2 TD, INT
VMI	Rushing	Aslin Shipe	10 carries, 66 yards
VMI	Receiving	Owen Sweeney	13 receptions, 208 yards, TD

=== Chattanooga ===
Chattanooga Mocs (3-4) vs. Samford Bulldogs (1-6) – Game summary

Quarter	1	2	3	4	Total
Mocs	7	7	14	21	49
Bulldogs	7	0	0	6	13

at Pete Hanna Stadium • Homewood, AL

- Date: October 25
- Game time: 2:30 PM CDT
- Game weather: Sunny • Temperature: 75 °F (24 °C) • Wind: NW at 9 miles per hour (14 km/h)
- Game attendance: 3,741
- Referee: Bruce Austin
- TV announcers (ESPN+): Blake Gardner (play-by-play), Damian Mitchell (analyst) and Christina Chambers (sideline)

Game information

First Quarter

- (8:20) SAM – Brady Stober 1-yard run, Jake Garner kick (Drive: 7 plays, 47 yards, 1:55; Samford 7–0)
- (2:22) UTC – Camden Orth 6-yard run, Jude Kelley kick (Drive: 6 plays, 61 yards, 3:13; Tied 7–7)

Second Quarter

- (10:58) UTC – A.J. Little 47-yard punt return, Jude Kelley kick (Chattanooga 14–7)

Third Quarter

- (7:17) UTC – John McIntyre 4-yard pass from Camden Orth, Jude Kelley kick (Drive: 7 plays, 92 yards, 4:01; Chattanooga 21–7)
- (1:15) UTC – A.J. Little 15-yard pass from Camden Orth, Jude Kelley kick (Drive: 6 plays, 52 yards, 2:32; Chattanooga 28–7)

Fourth Quarter

- (14:47) UTC – Jamarii Robinson 42-yard pass from Camden Orth, Jude Kelley kick (Drive: 3 plays, 55 yards, 0:59; Chattanooga 35–7)
- (7:18) SAM – Ken Cherry 2-yard run (Drive: 10 plays, 53 yards, 3:23; Chattanooga 35–13)
- (4:35) UTC – Solomon Locke 35-yard run, Jude Kelley kick (Drive: 5 plays, 43 yards, 2:42; Chattanooga 42–13)
- (1:07) UTC – Solomon Locke 31-yard run, Jude Kelley kick (Drive: 4 plays, 80 yards, 1:57; Chattanooga 49–13)

Statistics	UTC	SAM
First downs	18	19
Total yards	429	342
Rushing yards	257	94
Passing yards	172	248
Passing: Comp–Att–Int	11–20–0	22–44–2
Time of possession	32:19	27:41

Team	Category	Player	Statistics
Chattanooga	Passing	Camden Orth	11/20, 172 yards, 3 TD
Chattanooga	Rushing	Solomon Locke	5 carries, 115 yards, 2 TD
Chattanooga	Receiving	A.J. Little	4 receptions, 93 yards, TD
Samford	Passing	Charlie Gilliam	9/15, 138 yards, INT
Samford	Rushing	Emerson Russell	3 carries, 38 yards
Samford	Receiving	Jaden Gibson	5 receptions, 77 yards

=== at Wofford ===
Samford Bulldogs (1-7) vs. Wofford Terriers (2-6) – Game summary

Quarter	1	2	3	4	Total
Bulldogs	10	0	6	0	16
Terriers	14	0	9	3	26

at Gibbs Stadium • Spartanburg, SC

- Date: November 1
- Game time: 12:30 p.m. CDT
- Game weather: Sunny • Temperature: 60 °F (16 °C) • Wind: E at 1 mile per hour (1.6 km/h)
- Game attendance: 4,985
- Referee: Jake Grombach
- TV announcers (ESPN+): Jim Noble (play-by-play), Thom Henson (analyst) and Van Hipp (sideline)

Game information

First Quarter

- (11:49) SAM – Charlie Gilliam 2-yard pass from Charlie Gilliam, Jake Garner kick (Drive: 9 plays, 61 yards, 3:06; Samford 7–0)
- (9:51) WOF – Maximus Pulley 25-yard interception, Sam Spence kick (Tied 7–7)
- (8:50) WOF – Gerald Modest Jr. 5-yard run, Sam Spence kick (Drive: 2 plays, 17 yards, 0:48; Wofford 14–7)
- (3:46) SAM – Jake Garner 23-yard field goal (Drive: 4 plays, -3 yards, 1:25; Wofford 14–10)

Second Quarter

No scoring plays

Third Quarter

- (12:46) WOF – Eli Campbell 42-yard interception, Sam Spence kick (Wofford 21–10)
- (9:26) SAM – Jake Garner 25-yard field goal (Drive: 9 plays, 65 yards, 3:16; Wofford 21–13)
- (4:13) SAM – Jake Garner 30-yard field goal (Drive: 12 plays, 40 yards, 3:32; Wofford 21–16)
- (1:01) WOF – Brandon Maina 0-yard safety (Wofford 23–16)

Fourth Quarter

- (11:26) WOF – Sam Spence 25-yard field goal (Drive: 9 plays, 55 yards, 4:27; Wofford 26–16)

Statistics	SAM	WOF
First downs	18	10
Total yards	351	191
Rushing yards	19	111
Passing yards	332	80
Passing: Comp–Att–Int	34–51–4	14–24–1
Time of possession	28:14	31:46

Team	Category	Player	Statistics
Samford	Passing	Quincy Crittendon	19/25, 219 yards
Samford	Rushing	CJ Evans	4 carries, 12 yards
Samford	Receiving	Calvin Jones	9 receptions, 126 yards, TD
Wofford	Passing	JT Fayard	14/24, 80 yards, INT
Wofford	Rushing	Ihson Jackson-Anderson	16 carries, 85 yards
Wofford	Receiving	Ihson Jackson-Anderson	3 receptions, 35 yards

=== East Tennessee State ===
East Tennessee State Buccaneers (4-5) vs. Samford Bulldogs (1-8) – Game summary

Quarter	1	2	3	4	Total
Buccaneers	21	3	14	0	38
Bulldogs	7	0	0	7	14

at Pete Hanna Stadium • Homewood, AL

- Date: November 8
- Game time: 2:30 PM CST
- Game weather: Sunny • Temperature: 73 °F (23 °C) • Wind: NE at 3 miles per hour (4.8 km/h)
- Game attendance: 3,591
- Referee: Michael Farmer
- TV announcers (ESPN+): Blake Gardner (play-by-play), Damian Mitchell (analyst) and Christina Chambers (sideline)

Game information

First Quarter

- (13:40) ETSU – Devontae Houston 45-yard run, Ewan Johnson kick (Drive: 4 plays, 71 yards, 1:16; East Tennessee State 7–0)
- (12:45) ETSU – Xavier Gaillardetz 70-yard pass from Ephraim Floyd, Ewan Johnson kick (Drive: 1 play, 70 yards, 0:13; East Tennessee State 14–0)
- (7:55) ETSU – Karim Page 26-yard pass from Jacolby Criswell, Ewan Johnson kick (Drive: 9 plays, 92 yards, 3:49; East Tennessee State 21–0)
- (3:01) SAM – CJ Evans 20-yard pass from Quincy Crittendon, Jake Garner kick (Drive: 10 plays, 83 yards, 4:47; East Tennessee State 21–7)

Second Quarter

- (8:20) ETSU – Ewan Johnson 46-yard field goal (Drive: 8 plays, 28 yards, 2:41; East Tennessee State 24–7)

Third Quarter

- (12:39) ETSU – Charlie Browder 10-yard pass from Jacolby Criswell, Ewan Johnson kick (Drive: 6 plays, 77 yards, 1:39; East Tennessee State 31–7)
- (9:57) ETSU – Devontae Houston 40-yard run, Ewan Johnson kick (Drive: 3 plays, 60 yards, 0:54; East Tennessee State 38–7)

Fourth Quarter

- (4:55) SAM – Calvin Jones 25-yard pass from Brady Stober, Jake Garner kick (Drive: 12 plays, 93 yards, 4:16; East Tennessee State 38–14)

Statistics	ETSU	SAM
First downs	25	16
Total yards	600	312
Rushing yards	237	56
Passing yards	363	256
Passing: Comp–Att–Int	23–36–0	21–39–1
Time of possession	29:59	30:01

Team	Category	Player	Statistics
East Tennessee State	Passing	Jacolby Criswell	19/30, 261 yards, 2 TD
East Tennessee State	Rushing	Devontae Houston	18 carries, 151 yards, 2 TD
East Tennessee State	Receiving	Xavier Gaillardetz	3 receptions, 113 yards, TD
Samford	Passing	Brady Stober	12/26, 141 yards, TD
Samford	Rushing	Quincy Crittendon	6 carries, 30 yards
Samford	Receiving	Samuel Pickett III	3 receptions, 90 yards

=== at Austin Peay ===
Samford Bulldogs (1–9) at Austin Peay Governors (6–4) – Game summary

Quarter	1	2	3	4	Total
Bulldogs	0	3	0	13	16
Governors	14	3	10	3	30

at Fortera Stadium • Clarksville, Tennessee

- Date: November 15
- Game time: 1:00 PM CST
- Game attendance: 6,751
- TV announcers (ESPN+): Barry Gresham (play-by-play) and Ethan Schmidt (analyst)

Statistics	SAM	APSU
First downs		
Total yards		
Rushing yards		
Passing yards		
Passing: Comp–Att–Int		
Time of possession		

Team	Category	Player	Statistics
Samford	Passing		
Samford	Rushing		
Samford	Receiving		
Austin Peay	Passing		
Austin Peay	Rushing		
Austin Peay	Receiving		

=== at No. 3 (FBS) Texas A&M ===
Samford Bulldogs (1-10) at No. 3 (FBS) Texas A&M Aggies (10-0) – Game summary

Quarter	1	2	3	4	Total
Bulldogs	0	0	0	0	0
No. 3 (FBS) Aggies	21	10	7	10	48

at Kyle Field • College Station, TX

- Date: November 22
- Game time: 11:00 AM CST
- Game weather: Sunny • Temperature: 69 °F (21 °C) • Wind: N at 9 miles per hour (14 km/h)
- Game attendance: 104,877
- Referee: Tim Baker
- TV announcers (SECN+/ESPN+): Clay Matvick (play-by-play), Chase Daniel (analyst) and Marilyn Payne (sideline)

Game information

First quarter

- TA&M – Ashton Bethel-Roman 3-yard pass from Marcel Reed (Jared Zirkel Kick), 11:34. Aggies 7–0. Drive: 7 plays, 70 yards, 3:24
- TA&M – KC Concepcion 6-yard pass from Marcel Reed (Jared Zirkel Kick), 3:53. Aggies 14–0. Drive: 11 plays, 49 yards, 4:43
- TA&M – Ashton Bethel-Roman 58-yard pass from Marcel Reed (Jared Zirkel Kick), 0:06. Aggies 21–0. Drive: 4 plays, 79 yards, 1:32

Second quarter

- TA&M – Amari Daniels 1-yard run (Jared Zirkel Kick), 12:19. Aggies 28–0. Drive: 4 plays, 64 yards, 1:41
- TA&M – Jared Zirkel 25-yard field goal, 0:02. Aggies 31–0. Drive: 7 plays, 40 yards, 0:45

Third quarter

- TA&M – Tiger Riden Jr. 1-yard Rrn (Jared Zirkel Kick), 8:28. Aggies 38–0. Drive: 11 plays, 59 yards, 5:09

Fourth quarter

- TA&M – Jared Zirkel 39-yard field goal, 14:55. Aggies 41–0. Drive: 7 plays, 12 yards, 3:31
- TA&M – Preston Landis 2-yard run (Jared Zirkel Kick), 5:50. Aggies 48–0. Drive: 10 plays, 50 yards, 4:32

Statistics	SAM	TA&M
First downs	3	22
Plays–yards	48–77	80–475
Rushes–yards	31–31	43–247
Passing yards	46	228
Passing: comp–att–int	7–17–0	20–37–1
Turnovers	0	2
Time of possession	26:56	33:04

Team	Category	Player	Statistics
Samford	Passing	Quincy Crittendon	7/16, 46 yards
Samford	Rushing	Ken Cherry	10 carries, 9 yards
Samford	Receiving	Preston Bird	1 reception, 27 yards
Texas A&M	Passing	Marcel Reed	10/15, 120 yards, 3 TD
Texas A&M	Rushing	Amari Daniels	9 carries, 106 yards, TD
Texas A&M	Receiving	Ashton Bethel-Roman	2 receptions, 61 yards, 2 TD
