= 2025 The Citadel Bulldogs football team =

American college football season

2025 The Citadel Bulldogs football
- Conference: Southern Conference
- Record: 4–8 (3–5 SoCon)
- Head coach: Maurice Drayton (3rd season)
- Co-offensive coordinators: Patrick Covington (3rd season); Lamar Owens (2nd season)
- Offensive scheme: Spread option
- Defensive coordinator: Raleigh Jackson (3rd season)
- Base defense: 4–3
- Home stadium: Johnson Hagood Stadium

2025 Southern Conference football standings
	Conf.			Overall
Team	W		L	W		L
No. 17 Mercer $^	8	–	0	9	–	3
Western Carolina	6	–	2	7	–	5
East Tennessee State	5	–	3	7	–	5
Wofford	5	–	3	6	–	6
Chattanooga	4	–	4	5	–	7
Furman	4	–	4	6	–	6
The Citadel	3	–	5	4	–	8
Samford	1	–	7	1	–	11
VMI	0	–	8	1	–	11
$ – Conference champion; ^ – FCS playoff participant; Rankings from STATS Poll

The 2025 The Citadel Bulldogs football team represented The Citadel as a member of the Southern Conference (SoCon) during the 2025 NCAA Division I FCS football season. The Bulldogs were led by third-year head coach Maurice Drayton and played their home games at Johnson Hagood Stadium in Charleston, South Carolina.

== Schedule ==
Date	Time	Opponent	Site	TV	Result	Attendance
August 30	12:00 p.m.	No. 1 North Dakota State*	Johnson Hagood Stadium; Charleston, SC	ESPN+	L 0–38	10,695
September 6	3:30 p.m.	at Samford	Pete Hanna Stadium; Birmingham, AL	ESPN+	W 40–13	4,017
September 13	7:00 p.m.	at Gardner–Webb*	Ernest W. Spangler Stadium; Boiling Springs, NC	ESPN+	L 13–23	4,522
September 20	2:00 p.m.	Mercer	Johnson Hagood Stadium; Charleston, SC	ESPN+	L 0–38	11,339
September 27	6:00 p.m.	at Chattanooga	Finley Stadium; Chattanooga, TN	ESPN+	W 28–10	6,725
October 11	2:00 p.m.	Valdosta State*	Johnson Hagood Stadium; Charleston, SC	ESPN+	W 38–14	8,693
October 18	2:00 p.m.	Western Carolina	Johnson Hagood Stadium; Charleston, SC	ESPN+	L 38−45	9,151
October 25	2:00 p.m.	at Furman	Paladin Stadium; Greenville, SC	ESPN+	L 14–24	10,017
November 1	2:00 p.m.	VMI	Johnson Hagood Stadium; Charleston, SC (Military Classic of the South)	ESPN+	W 35–24	11,127
November 8	1:00 p.m.	at No. 6 (FBS) Ole Miss*	Vaught–Hemingway Stadium; Oxford, MS	SECN+/ESPN+	L 0–49	67,326
November 15	2:00 p.m.	Wofford^{†}	Johnson Hagood Stadium; Charleston, SC	ESPN+	L 14–16	12,909
November 22	1:00 p.m.	at East Tennessee State	William B. Greene Jr. Stadium; Johnson City, TN	ESPN+	L 26–28	9,049
*Non-conference game; ^{†}Homecoming; Rankings from STATS Poll released prior to the game; All times are in Eastern time

== Game summaries ==
=== No. 1 North Dakota State ===
No. 1 North Dakota State Bison (0-0) at The Citadel Bulldogs (0-0) – Game summary

Quarter	1	2	3	4	Total
No. 1 Bison	0	17	14	7	38
Bulldogs	0	0	0	0	0

at Johnson Hagood Stadium • Charleston, SC

- Date: August 30
- Game time: 12:00 PM EDT
- Game weather: Rain • Temperature: 72 °F (22 °C) • Wind: NE at 15 miles per hour (24 km/h)
- Game attendance: 10,691
- Referee: Jake Grombach
- TV announcers (ESPN+): Pete Yanity (play-by-play), Jay Sonnhalter (analyst) and Dave Friedman (sideline)

Game information

First Quarter

No scoring

Second Quarter

- (13:36) NDSU – Eli Ozick 31-yard field goal (Drive: 9 plays, 72 yards, 3:55; North Dakota State 3–0)
- (5:10) NDSU – Barika Kpeenu 2-yard run, Eli Ozick kick (Drive: 12 plays, 90 yards, 6:22; North Dakota State 10–0)
- (1:36) NDSU – RaJa Nelson 34-yard pass from Cole Payton, Eli Ozick kick (Drive: 7 plays, 84 yards, 1:57; North Dakota State 17–0)

Third Quarter

- (14:13) NDSU – Barika Kpeenu 1-yard run, Eli Ozick kick (Drive: 2 plays, 1 yard, 0:34; North Dakota State 24–0)
- (4:54) NDSU – DJ Scott 1-yard run, Eli Ozick kick (Drive: 12 plays, 82 yards, 7:14; North Dakota State 31–0)

Fourth Quarter

- (5:07) NDSU – Isiah St. Romain 15-yard pass from Nathan Hayes, Eli Ozick kick (Drive: 12 plays, 95 yards, 7:20; North Dakota State 38–0)

Statistics	NDSU	CIT
First downs	25	8
Total yards	519	126
Rushing yards	256	104
Passing yards	263	22
Passing: Comp–Att–Int	16–22–0	2–6–0
Time of possession	36:03	23:57

Team	Category	Player	Statistics
North Dakota State	Passing	Cole Payton	11/17, 192 yards, TD
North Dakota State	Rushing	Cole Payton	11 carries, 101 yards
North Dakota State	Receiving	RaJa Nelson	2 receptions, 60 yards, TD
The Citadel	Passing	Quentin Hayes	1/3, 14 yards
The Citadel	Rushing	Israel Benjamin	16 carries, 54 yards
The Citadel	Receiving	Javonte Graves-Billips	1 reception, 14 yards

=== at Samford ===
The Citadel Bulldogs (0-1) at Samford Bulldogs (0-1) – Game summary

Quarter	1	2	3	4	Total
The Citadel	0	10	10	20	40
Samford	0	6	0	7	13

at Pete Hanna Stadium • Homewood, AL

- Date: September 6
- Game time: 2:30 PM CDT
- Game weather: Cloud • Temperature: 83 °F (28 °C)
- Game attendance: 4,017
- Referee: Michael Farmer
- TV announcers (ESPN+): Blake Gardner (play-by-play), Damian Mitchell (analyst) and Christina Chambers (sideline)

Game information

First Quarter

No scoring

Second Quarter

- (14:46) SAM – Jake Garner 40-yard field goal (Drive: 7 plays, 13 yards, 1:17; Samford 3–0)
- (8:34) SAM – Jake Garner 20-yard field goal (Drive: 12 plays, 60 yards, 4:25; Samford 6–0)
- (6:03) CIT – Javonte Graves-Billups 43-yard pass from Cobey Thompkins, Ben Barnes kick (Drive: 5 plays, 75 yards, 2:31; The Citadel 7–6)
- (0:03) CIT – Ben Barnes 40-yard field goal (Drive: 7 plays, 57 yards, 0:36; The Citadel 10–6)

Third Quarter

- (11:21) CIT – Ben Barnes 28-yard field goal (Drive: 6 plays, 15 yards, 3:17; The Citadel 13–6)
- (3:03) CIT – Sayre Smothers 31-yard fumble recovery, Ben Barnes kick (The Citadel 20–6)

Fourth Quarter

- (13:48) CIT – Bradlee Jones 59-yard fumble recovery, Ben Barnes kick (The Citadel 27–6)
- (11:17) SAM – CJ Evans 5-yard run, Jake Garner kick (Drive: 8 plays, 75 yards, 2:31; The Citadel 27–13)
- (4:34) CIT – Javonte Graves-Billups 13-yard pass from Quentin Hayes, 2-pt conversion failed (Drive: 5 plays, 55 yards, 1:32; The Citadel 33–13)
- (1:45) CIT – Quentin Hayes 18-yard run, Jake Garner kick (Drive: 4 plays, 27 yards, 1:32; The Citadel 40–13)

Statistics	CIT	SAM
First downs	15	26
Total yards	330	452
Rushing yards	162	90
Passing yards	168	362
Passing: Comp–Att–Int	10–13–0	43–62–3
Time of possession	29:51	30:09

Team	Category	Player	Statistics
The Citadel	Passing	Cobey Thompkins	9/11, 155 yards, TD
The Citadel	Rushing	Cobey Thompkins	13 carries, 76 yards
The Citadel	Receiving	Javonte Graves-Billips	6 receptions, 139 yards, 2 TD
Samford	Passing	Quincy Crittendon	40/56, 324 yards, 3 INT
Samford	Rushing	Quincy Crittendon	14 carries, 35 yards
Samford	Receiving	Jaden Gibson	10 receptions, 91 yards

=== at Gardner–Webb ===
The Citadel Bulldogs (1-1) at Gardner–Webb Runnin' Bulldogs (1-1) – Game summary

Quarter	1	2	3	4	Total
Bulldogs	0	0	7	6	13
Runnin' Bulldogs	10	7	3	3	23

at Ernest W. Spangler Stadium • Boiling Springs, NC

- Date: September 13
- Game time: 7:00 PM EDT
- Game weather: Sunny
- Game attendance: 4,522
- Referee: John Kellermeier
- TV announcers (ESPN+): Ford Martin (play-by-play) and Bryson Byrnes (analyst)

Game information

First Quarter

- (7:14) GWU – Charles Viorel 26-yard field goal (Drive: 12 plays, 42 yards, 5:34; Gardner–Webb 3–0)
- (0:47) GWU – Caleb Borders 11-yard pass from Nate Hampton, Charles Viorel kick (Drive: 8 plays, 79 yards, 4:08; Gardner–Webb 10–0)

Second Quarter

- (6:15) GWU – Chris Lofton 67-yard pass from Nate Hampton, Charles Viorel kick (Drive: 2 plays, 69 yards, 0:43; Gardner–Webb 17–0)

Third Quarter

- (11:02) GWU – Charles Viorel 33-yard field goal (Drive: 4 plays, -1 yards, 0:39; Gardner–Webb 20–0)
- (1:39) CIT – Sebastien Boyle 2-yard run, Ben Barnes kick (Drive: 8 plays, 72 yards, 4:00; Gardner–Webb 20–7)

Fourth Quarter

- (10:57) GWU – Charles Viorel 27-yard field goal (Drive: 12 plays, 58 yards, 5:35; Gardner–Webb 23–7)
- (0:02) CIT – Braylon Knauth 1-yard pass from Cobey Thompkins (Drive: 8 plays, 99 yards, 1:31; Gardner–Webb 23–13)

Statistics	CIT	GWEB
First downs	14	16
Total yards	307	334
Rushing yards	210	118
Passing yards	97	216
Passing: Comp–Att–Int	6–11–0	15–25–0
Time of possession	30:50	28:23

Team	Category	Player	Statistics
The Citadel	Passing	Cobey Thompkins	6/10, 97 yards, TD
The Citadel	Rushing	Garrison Johnson Sr.	13 carries, 73 yards
The Citadel	Receiving	Braylon Knauth	3 receptions, 44 yards, TD
Gardner–Webb	Passing	Nate Hampton	13/22, 206 yards, 2 TD
Gardner–Webb	Rushing	Quasean Holmes	17 carries, 90 yards
Gardner–Webb	Receiving	Chris Lofton	3 receptions, 90 yards, TD

=== Mercer ===
Mercer Bears (1-1) vs. The Citadel Bulldogs (1-2) – Game summary

Quarter	1	2	3	4	Total
Bears	10	7	7	14	38
Bulldogs	0	0	0	0	0

at Johnson Hagood Stadium • Charleston, SC

- Date: September 20
- Game time: 2:00 PM EDT
- Game weather: Sunny
- Game attendance: 11,339
- Referee: Bruce Austin
- TV announcers (ESPN+): Dave Weinstein (play-by-play), Vad Lee (analyst) and Matison Little (sideline)

Statistics	MER	CIT
First downs		
Total yards		
Rushing yards		
Passing yards		
Passing: Comp–Att–Int		
Time of possession		

Team	Category	Player	Statistics
Mercer	Passing		
Mercer	Rushing		
Mercer	Receiving		
The Citadel	Passing		
The Citadel	Rushing		
The Citadel	Receiving		

=== at Chattanooga ===
The Citadel Bulldogs (1-3) vs. Chattanooga Mocs (1-3) – Game summary

Quarter	1	2	3	4	Total
Bulldogs	7	14	7	0	28
Mocs	7	3	0	0	10

at Finley Stadium • Chattanooga, TN

- Date: September 27
- Game time: 6:00 PM EDT
- Game weather: Sunny • Temperature: 83 °F (28 °C) • Wind: N at 8 miles per hour (13 km/h)
- Game attendance: 6,725
- Referee: Michael Farmer
- TV announcers (ESPN+): Chris Goforth (play-by-play), Chris Barnett (analyst) and Mackenzie Johnson (sideline)

Statistics	CIT	UTC
First downs		
Total yards		
Rushing yards		
Passing yards		
Passing: Comp–Att–Int		
Time of possession		

Team	Category	Player	Statistics
The Citadel	Passing		
The Citadel	Rushing		
The Citadel	Receiving		
Chattanooga	Passing		
Chattanooga	Rushing		
Chattanooga	Receiving		

=== Valdosta State (DII) ===
Valdosta State Blazers (DII) (2-2) vs. The Citadel Bulldogs (2-3) – Game summary

Quarter	1	2	3	4	Total
Blazers (DII)	0	7	0	7	14
Bulldogs	14	10	7	7	38

at Johnson Hagood Stadium • Charleston, SC

- Date: October 11
- Game time: 2:00 PM EDT
- Game weather: Rain
- Game attendance: 8,693
- Referee: Jeff Page
- TV announcers (ESPN+): Dave Weinstein (play-by-play), Vad Lee (analyst) and Matison Little (sideline)

Statistics	VAL	CIT
First downs		
Total yards		
Rushing yards		
Passing yards		
Passing: Comp–Att–Int		
Time of possession		

Team	Category	Player	Statistics
Valdosta State	Passing		
Valdosta State	Rushing		
Valdosta State	Receiving		
The Citadel	Passing		
The Citadel	Rushing		
The Citadel	Receiving		

=== Western Carolina ===
Western Carolina Catamounts (4-3) vs. The Citadel Bulldogs (3-3) – Game summary

Quarter	1	2	3	4	Total
Catamounts	7	17	14	7	45
Bulldogs	14	3	7	14	38

at Johnson Hagood Stadium • Charleston, SC

- Date: October 18
- Game time: 2:00 PM EDT
- Game weather: Sunny
- Game attendance: 9,151
- Referee: Bruce Austin
- TV announcers (ESPN+): Dave Weinstein (play-by-play), Vad Lee (analyst) and Matison Little (sideline)

Game information

First Quarter

- (11:23) CIT – Braylon Knauth 61-yard pass from Cobey Thompkins, Ben Barnes kick (Drive: 1 play, 61 yards, 0:13; The Citadel 7–0)
- (9:07) WCU – Malik Knight 14-yard pass from Taron Dickens, Marcus Trout kick (Drive: 6 plays, 65 yards, 2:10; Tied 7–7)
- (0:53) CIT – Quentin Hayes 5-yard run, Ben Barnes kick (Drive: 7 plays, 80 yards, 4:27; The Citadel 14–7)

Second Quarter

- (10:41) WCU – Josiah Thomas 5-yard pass from Taron Dickens, Marcus Trout kick (Drive: 11 plays, 70 yards, 5:03; Tied 14–14)
- (5:17) CIT – Ben Barnes 42-yard field goal (Drive: 4 plays, -4 yards, 2:01; The Citadel 17–14)
- (1:56) WCU – Markel Townsend 7-yard run, Marcus Trout kick (Drive: 8 plays, 75 yards, 3:21; Western Carolina 21–17)
- (0:00) WCU – Marcus Trout 25-yard field goal (Drive: 7 plays, 38 yards, 1:05; Western Carolina 24–17)

Third Quarter

- (11:35) WCU – James Tyre 9-yard pass from Taron Dickens, Marcus Trout kick (Drive: 7 plays, 73 yards, 3:19; Western Carolina 31–17)
- (5:31) CIT – Beau Herrington 12-yard run, Ben Barnes kick (Drive: 10 plays, 75 yards, 6:02; Western Carolina 31–24)
- (2:48) WCU – Malik Knight 37-yard pass from Taron Dickens, Marcus Trout kick (Drive: 6 plays, 51 yards, 2:36; Western Carolina 38–24)

Fourth Quarter

- (12:21) CIT – Quentin Hayes 8-yard run, Ben Barnes kick (Drive: 10 plays, 75 yards, 5:27; Western Carolina 38–31)
- (3:01) WCU – Dominic Dutton 18-yard pass from Taron Dickens, Marcus Trout kick (Drive: 10 plays, 87 yards, 4:57; Western Carolina 45–31)
- (1:36) CIT – Cobey Thompkins 20-yard run, Ben Barnes kick (Drive: 6 plays, 75 yards, 1:25; Western Carolina 45–38)

Statistics	WCU	CIT
First downs	29	15
Total yards	515	410
Rushing yards	146	278
Passing yards	369	132
Passing: Comp–Att–Int	28–33–1	5–9–0
Time of possession	29:44	30:16

Team	Category	Player	Statistics
Western Carolina	Passing	Taron Dickens	28/33, 369 yards, 5 TD, INT
Western Carolina	Rushing	Markel Townsend	15 carries, 90 yards, TD
Western Carolina	Receiving	James Tyre	7 receptions, 112 yards, TD
The Citadel	Passing	Cobey Thompkins	3/5, 111 yards, TD
The Citadel	Rushing	Quentin Hayes	15 carries, 90 yards, 2 TD
The Citadel	Receiving	Braylon Knauth	2 receptions, 69 yards, TD

=== at Furman (rivalry) ===
The Citadel Bulldogs (3-4) vs. Furman Paladins (4-3) – Game summary

Quarter	1	2	3	4	Total
Bulldogs	0	0	14	0	14
Paladins	6	3	8	7	24

at Paladin Stadium • Greenville, SC

- Date: October 25
- Game time: 2:00 p.m. EDT
- Game weather: Sunny • Temperature: 64 °F (18 °C) • Wind: E at 5 miles per hour (8.0 km/h)
- Game attendance: 10,018
- Referee: Jake Grombach
- TV announcers (ESPN+): Dan Scott (play-by-play), David Cobb (analyst) and Tom Van Hoy (sideline)

Game information

First Quarter

- (11:43) FUR – Ian Williams 45-yard field goal (Drive: 7 plays, 47 yards, 3:17; Furman 3–0)
- (3:56) FUR – Ian Williams 36-yard field goal (Drive: 10 plays, 60 yards, 5:37; Furman 6–0)

Second Quarter

- (1:06) FUR – Ian Williams 21-yard field goal (Drive: 11 plays, 70 yards, 4:48; Furman 9–0)

Third Quarter

- (13:05) CIT – Jihad Marks 46-yard pass from Quentin Hayes, Ben Barnes kick (Drive: 4 plays, 75 yards, 1:55; Furman 9–7)
- (9:43) CIT – Jihad Marks 46-yard pass from Quentin Hayes, Ben Barnes kick (Drive: 3 plays, 58 yards, 1:15; Citadel 14–9)
- (3:30) FUR – Jayquan Smith 2-yard run, Jayquan Smith rush (Drive: 4 plays, 40 yards, 1:58; Furman 17–14)

Fourth Quarter

- (3:21) FUR – Jayquan Smith 7-yard run, Ian Williams kick (Drive: 10 plays, 80 yards, 5:39; Furman 24–14)

Statistics	CIT	FUR
First downs	15	17
Total yards	337	351
Rushing yards	133	140
Passing yards	204	211
Passing: Comp–Att–Int	14–18–0	16–22–0
Time of possession	28:09	31:51

Team	Category	Player	Statistics
The Citadel	Passing	Quentin Hayes	11/15, 194 yards, 2 TD
The Citadel	Rushing	Quentin Hayes	13 carries, 39 yards
The Citadel	Receiving	Jihad Marks	3 receptions, 108 yards, 2 TD
Furman	Passing	Trey Hedden	16/22, 211 yards
Furman	Rushing	Ben Croasdale	19 carries, 91 yards
Furman	Receiving	Evan James	8 receptions, 126 yards

=== VMI (Military Classic of the South) ===
VMI Keydets (1-7) vs. The Citadel Bulldogs (3-5) – Game summary

Quarter	1	2	3	4	Total
Keydets	7	7	7	3	24
Bulldogs	0	0	7	28	35

at Johnson Hagood Stadium • Charleston, SC

- Date: November 1
- Game time: 2:00 PM EDT
- Game weather: Sunny
- Game attendance: 11,127
- Referee: Jeff Page
- TV announcers (ESPN+): Dave Weinstein (play-by-play), Vad Lee (analyst) and Matison Little (sideline)

Game information

First Quarter

- (0:55) VMI – Nana Utsey 1-yard run, Jack Joyce kick (Drive: 9 plays, 66 yards, 4:44; VMI 7–0)

Second Quarter

- (0:10) VMI – Malik McNeely 9-yard pass from Collin Shannon, Jack Joyce kick (Drive: 15 plays, 98 yards, 6:16; VMI 14–0)

Third Quarter

- (11:14) VMI – Noah Grevious 59-yard pass from Collin Shannon, Jack Joyce kick (Drive: 4 plays, 71 yards, 1:51; VMI 21–0)
- (6:50) CIT – Jihad Marks 19-yard pass from Quentin Hayes, Ben Barnes kick (Drive: 11 plays, 75 yards, 4:24; VMI 21–7)

Fourth Quarter

- (14:58) VMI – Ben Shrewsbury 26-yard field goal (Drive: 10 plays, 88 yards, 4:20; VMI 24–7)
- (12:28) CIT – Quentin Hayes 6-yard run, Ben Barnes kick (Drive: 8 plays, 78 yards, 2:27; VMI 24–14)
- (10:36) CIT – Jihad Marks 72-yard pass from Quentin Hayes, Ben Barnes kick (Drive: 2 plays, 88 yards, 0:26; VMI 24–21)
- (4:33) CIT – Garrison Johnson Sr. 11-yard run, Ben Barnes kick (Drive: 9 plays, 76 yards, 3:28; The Citadel 28–24)
- (0:12) CIT – Jihad Marks 33-yard pass from Quentin Hayes, Ben Barnes kick (Drive: 4 plays, 42 yards, 1:00; The Citadel 35–24)

Statistics	VMI	CIT
First downs	19	24
Total yards	463	511
Rushing yards	202	329
Passing yards	261	182
Passing: Comp–Att–Int	21–29–0	7–10–0
Time of possession	30:34	29:26

Team	Category	Player	Statistics
VMI	Passing	Collin Shannon	21/29, 261 yards, 2 TD
VMI	Rushing	Leo Boehling	14 carries, 149 yards
VMI	Receiving	Noah Grevious	11 receptions, 138 yards, TD
The Citadel	Passing	Quentin Hayes	5/7, 175 yards, 3 TD
The Citadel	Rushing	Cobey Thompkins	11 carries, 101 yards
The Citadel	Receiving	Jihad Marks	4 receptions, 168 yards, 3 TD

=== at No. 6 (FBS) Ole Miss ===
The Citadel Bulldogs (4-5) at No. 6 (FBS) Ole Miss Rebels (8-1) – Game summary

Quarter	1	2	3	4	Total
Bulldogs	0	0	0	0	0
No. 6 (FBS) Rebels	21	14	7	7	49

at Vaught–Hemingway Stadium • Oxford, MS

- Date: November 8
- Game time: 12:00 PM CDT
- TV announcers (ESPN+/SECN+): Dave Neal (play-by-play), Fozzy Whittaker (analyst), and Morgan Uber (sideline)

Game information

First quarter

- MISS – Kewan Lacy 2-yard run (Lucas Carneiro kick), 11:43. Rebels 7–0. Drive: 10 plays, 87 yards, 3:11.
- MISS – Kewan Lacy 15-yard run (Lucas Carneiro kick), 6:34. Rebels 14–0. Drive: 9 plays, 77 yards, 2:46.
- MISS – Winston Watkins 11-yard pass from Trinidad Chambliss (Lucas Carneiro kick), 0:23. Rebels 21–0. Drive: 3 plays, 72 yards, 0:44.

Second quarter

- MISS – Cayden Lee 22-yard pass from Trinidad Chambliss (Lucas Carneiro kick), 10:48. Rebels 28–0. Drive: 7 plays, 68 yards, 2:38.
- MISS – Kewan Lacy 3-yard run (Lucas Carneiro kick), 0:45. Rebels 35–0. Drive: 11 plays, 80 yards, 3:21.

Third quarter

- MISS – Caleb Odom 1-yard pass from Trinidad Chambliss (Lucas Carneiro kick), 11:31. Rebels 42–0. Drive: 5 plays, 53 yards, 1:45.

Fourth quarter

- MISS – Damian Taylor 1-yard run (Lucas Carneiro kick), 6:24. Rebels 49–0. Drive: 9 plays, 61 yards, 3:10.

Statistics	CIT	MISS
First downs	5	35
Plays–yards	50–106	81–603
Rushes–yards	42–83	35–151
Passing yards	23	452
Passing: comp–att–int	3–8–0	37–46–1
Turnovers	0	1
Time of possession	32:04	27:56

Team	Category	Player	Statistics
The Citadel	Passing	Cobey Thompkins	3/6, 23 yards
The Citadel	Rushing	Beau Herrington	7 carries, 53 yards
The Citadel	Receiving	Jihad Marks	1 reception, 16 yards
Ole Miss	Passing	Trinidad Chambliss	29/33, 300 yards, 3 TD
Ole Miss	Rushing	Kewan Lacy	11 carries, 49 yards, 3 TD
Ole Miss	Receiving	Harrison Wallace III	8 receptions, 87 yards

=== Wofford (rivalry) ===
Wofford Terriers (0-0) vs. The Citadel Bulldogs (0-0) – Game summary

Quarter	1	2	3	4	Total
Terriers	-	-	-	-	0
Bulldogs	-	-	-	-	0

at Johnson Hagood Stadium • Charleston, SC

- Date: November 15
- Game time: 2:00 PM EST

Statistics	WOF	CIT
First downs		
Total yards		
Rushing yards		
Passing yards		
Passing: Comp–Att–Int		
Time of possession		

Team	Category	Player	Statistics
Wofford	Passing		
Wofford	Rushing		
Wofford	Receiving		
The Citadel	Passing		
The Citadel	Rushing		
The Citadel	Receiving		

=== at East Tennessee State ===
The Citadel Bulldogs (4-7) vs. East Tennessee State Buccaneers (6-5) – Game summary

Quarter	1	2	3	4	Total
Bulldogs	7	7	3	9	26
Buccaneers	14	14	0	0	28

at William B. Greene Jr. Stadium • Johnson City, TN

- Date: November 22
- Game time: 1:00 p.m. EST
- Game weather: Cloudy • Temperature: 63 °F (17 °C) • Wind: E at 10 miles per hour (16 km/h)
- Game attendance: 9,049
- Referee: Jake Grombach
- TV announcers (ESPN+): Keith Brake (play-by-play), Mark Hutsell (analyst) and Kennedy Story (sideline)

Game information

First Quarter

- (12:58) CIT – Garrison Johnson 63-yard run, Ben Barnes kick (Drive: 1 play, 63 yards, 0:12; The Citadel 7–0)
- (8:41) ETSU – Devontae Houston 1-yard run, Ewan Johnson kick (Drive: 12 plays, 75 yards, 4:17; Tied 7–7)
- (1:27) ETSU – Karim Page 17-yard pass from Jacolby Criswell, Ewan Johnson kick (Drive: 11 plays, 80 yards, 3:59; East Tennessee State 14–7)

Second Quarter

- (8:48) ETSU – Jason Albritton 1-yard run, Ewan Johnson kick (Drive: 9 plays, 56 yards, 3:29; East Tennessee State 21–7)
- (2:59) CIT – Beau Herrington 2-yard run, Ben Barnes kick (Drive: 11 plays, 75 yards, 5:49; East Tennessee State 21–14)
- (0:42) ETSU – Devontae Houston 15-yard run, Ewan Johnson kick (Drive: 9 plays, 74 yards, 2:12; East Tennessee State 28–14)

Third Quarter

- (7:51) CIT – Ben Barnes 31-yard field goal (Drive: 13 plays, 62 yards, 7:09; East Tennessee State 28–17)

Fourth Quarter

- (13:34) CIT – Jihad Marks 39-yard pass from Quentin Hayes (Drive: 6 plays, 80 yards, 3:30; East Tennessee State 28–23)
- (7:37) CIT – Ben Barnes 33-yard field goal (Drive: 9 plays, 37 yards, 4:35; East Tennessee State 28–26)

Statistics	CIT	ETSU
First downs	22	23
Total yards	431	409
Rushing yards	218	165
Passing yards	213	244
Passing: Comp–Att–Int	12–20–2	18–26–1
Time of possession	32:00	28:00

Team	Category	Player	Statistics
The Citadel	Passing	Quentin Hayes	11/18, 200 yards, TD, 2 INT
The Citadel	Rushing	Quentin Hayes	18 carries, 103 yards
The Citadel	Receiving	Javonte Graves-Billips	4 receptions, 52 yards
East Tennessee State	Passing	Jacolby Criswell	18/26, 244 yards, TD, INT
East Tennessee State	Rushing	Devontae Houston	28 carries, 125 yards, 2 TD
East Tennessee State	Receiving	Charlie Browder	3 receptions 55 yards
