= 2025 Furman Paladins football team =

American college football season

2025 Furman Paladins football
- Conference: Southern Conference
- Record: 6–6 (4–4 SoCon)
- Head coach: Clay Hendrix (9th season)
- Offensive coordinator: Justin Roper (4th season)
- Defensive coordinator: Duane Vaughn (7th season)
- Co-defensive coordinator: Chad Byers (4th season)
- Home stadium: Paladin Stadium

2025 Southern Conference football standings
	Conf.			Overall
Team	W		L	W		L
No. 17 Mercer $^	8	–	0	9	–	3
Western Carolina	6	–	2	7	–	5
East Tennessee State	5	–	3	7	–	5
Wofford	5	–	3	6	–	6
Chattanooga	4	–	4	5	–	7
Furman	4	–	4	6	–	6
The Citadel	3	–	5	4	–	8
Samford	1	–	7	1	–	11
VMI	0	–	8	1	–	11
$ – Conference champion; ^ – FCS playoff participant; Rankings from STATS Poll

The 2025 Furman Paladins football team represented Furman University as a member of the Southern Conference (SoCon) during the 2025 NCAA Division I FCS football season. The Paladins were coached by ninth-year head coach Clay Hendrix and played at the Paladin Stadium in Greenville, South Carolina.

== Schedule ==
Date	Time	Opponent	Site	TV	Result	Attendance
August 30	2:00 p.m.	William & Mary*	Paladin Stadium; Greenville, SC	ESPN+	W 23–21	8,347
September 6	2:00 p.m.	Presbyterian*	Paladin Stadium; Greenville, SC	ESPN+	L 38–39 ^{OT}	7,897
September 13	3:30 p.m.	at Campbell*	Barker–Lane Stadium; Buies Creek, NC	FloFootball	W 28–24	4,314
September 27	3:30 p.m.	at Samford	Pete Hanna Stadium; Homewood, AL	ESPN+	W 31–13	7,521
October 4	2:00 p.m.	East Tennessee State	Paladin Stadium; Greenville, SC	ESPN+	W 31–22	10,527
October 11	2:30 p.m.	at Western Carolina	Bob Waters Field at E. J. Whitmire Stadium; Cullowhee, NC	ESPN+	L 7–52	8,375
October 18	12:00 p.m.	at Wofford	Gibbs Stadium; Spartanburg, SC (rivalry)	ESPN+	L 13–31	3,086
October 25	2:00 p.m.	The Citadel^{†}	Paladin Stadium; Greenville, SC (rivalry)	ESPN+	W 24–14	10,017
November 1	2:00 p.m.	No. 15 Mercer	Paladin Stadium; Greenville, SC	ESPN+	L 28–52	7,867
November 8	1:30 p.m.	at Chattanooga	Finley Stadium; Chattanooga, TN	ESPN+	L 28–45	6,305
November 15	1:00 p.m.	VMI	Paladin Stadium; Greenville, SC	ESPN+	W 32–14	8,527
November 22	4:30 p.m.	at Clemson*	Memorial Stadium; Clemson, SC	The CW	L 10–45	78,403
*Non-conference game; ^{†}Homecoming; Rankings from STATS Poll released prior to the game; All times are in Eastern time

== Game summaries ==
=== William & Mary ===
William & Mary Tribe (0-0) vs. Furman Paladins (0-0) – Game summary

Quarter	1	2	3	4	Total
Tribe	-	-	-	-	0
Paladins	-	-	-	-	0

at Paladin Stadium • Greenville, SC

- Date: August 30
- Game time: 2:00 p.m. EDT
- TV: ESPN+

Statistics	W&M	FUR
First downs		
Total yards		
Rushing yards		
Passing yards		
Passing: Comp–Att–Int		
Time of possession		

Team	Category	Player	Statistics
William & Mary	Passing		
William & Mary	Rushing		
William & Mary	Receiving		
Furman	Passing		
Furman	Rushing		
Furman	Receiving		

=== Presbyterian ===
Presbyterian Blue Hose (1-0) vs. Furman Paladins (1-0) – Game summary

Quarter	1	2	3	4	OT	Total
Blue Hose	7	7	7	10	8	39
Paladins	7	21	3	0	7	38

at Paladin Stadium • Greenville, SC

- Date: September 6
- Game time: 2:00 p.m. EDT
- Game weather: Sunny • Temperature: 85 °F (29 °C) • Wind: SW at 7 miles per hour (11 km/h)
- Game attendance: 7,897
- Referee: Jeff Page
- TV announcers (ESPN+): Dan Scott (play-by-play), David Cobb (analyst) and Tom Van Hoy (sideline)

Game information

First Quarter

- (11:22) FUR – Gavin Hall 13-yard run, Ian Williams kick (Drive: 8 plays, 52 yards, 3:31; Furman 7–0)
- (4:15) PC – Cincere Gill 13-yard pass from Collin Hurst, Jett Jackson kick (Drive: 5 plays, 80 yards, 2:04; Tied 7–7)

Second Quarter

- (13:21) FUR – Gavin Hall 5-yard run, Ian Williams kick (Drive: 12 plays, 75 yards, 5:54; Furman 14–7)
- (9:31) FUR – Ja'Keith Hamilton 22-yard pass from Trey Hedden, Ian Williams kick (Drive: 4 plays, 59 yards, 1:16; Furman 21–7)
- (5:01) FUR – Jayquan Smith 1-yard run, Ian Williams kick (Drive: 6 plays, 58 yards, 2:33; Furman 28–7)
- (1:51) PC – Nathan Levicki 17-yard pass from Collin Hurst, Jett Jackson kick (Drive: 2 plays, 41 yards, 0:32; Furman 28–14)

Third Quarter

- (9:43) FUR – Ian Williams 34-yard field goal (Drive: 4 plays, -5 yards, 2:20; Furman 31–14)
- (5:10) PC – Zach Switzer 3-yard pass from Collin Hurst, Jett Jackson kick (Drive: 11 plays, 75 yards, 4:33; Furman 31–21)

Fourth Quarter

- (6:25) PC – Jett Jackson 25-yard field goal (Drive: 8 plays, 47 yards, 2:30; Furman 31–24)
- (4:38) PC – BJ Atkins 12-yard pass from Collin Hurst, Jett Jackson kick (Drive: 1 play, 12 yards, 0:08; Tied 31–31)

Overtime

- FUR – Jayquan Smith 2-yard run, Ian Williams kick (Drive: 6 plays, 25 yards, 0:00; Furman 38–31)
- PC – Nathan Levicki 3-yard pass from Collin Hurst, Jett Jackson kick (Drive: 2 plays, 25 yards, 0:00; Presbyterian 39–38)

Statistics	PRES	FUR
First downs	23	21
Total yards	444	370
Rushing yards	169	107
Passing yards	275	263
Passing: Comp–Att–Int	26–41–3	29–40–2
Time of possession	28:56	31:04

Team	Category	Player	Statistics
Presbyterian	Passing	Collin Hurst	26/41, 275 yards, 5 TD, 3 INT
Presbyterian	Rushing	Zach Switzer	16 carries, 67 yards
Presbyterian	Receiving	Nathan Levicki	6 receptions, 60 yards, 2 TD
Furman	Passing	Trey Hedden	29/40, 263 yards, TD, 2 INT
Furman	Rushing	Gavin Hall	15 carries, 64 yards, 2 TD
Furman	Receiving	Evan James	8 receptions, 89 yards

=== at Campbell ===
Furman Paladins (1-1) vs. Campbell Fighting Camels (0-2) – Game summary

Quarter	1	2	3	4	Total
Paladins	-	-	-	-	0
Fighting Camels	-	-	-	-	0

at Barker–Lane Stadium • Buies Creek, NC

- Date: September 13
- Game time: 3:30 PM EDT
- TV announcers (FloFootball): Chris Hemeyer (play-by-play) and Jay Sonnhalter (analyst)

Statistics	FUR	CAM
First downs		
Total yards		
Rushing yards		
Passing yards		
Passing: Comp–Att–Int		
Time of possession		

Team	Category	Player	Statistics
Furman	Passing		
Furman	Rushing		
Furman	Receiving		
Campbell	Passing		
Campbell	Rushing		
Campbell	Receiving		

=== at Samford ===
Furman Paladins (2-1) vs. Samford Bulldogs (0-4) – Game summary

Quarter	1	2	3	4	Total
Paladins	14	7	10	0	31
Bulldogs	0	7	0	6	13

at Pete Hanna Stadium • Homewood, AL

- Date: September 27
- Game time: 3:30 p.m. EDT
- Game weather: Sunny • Temperature: 83 °F (28 °C) • Wind: N at 5 miles per hour (8.0 km/h)
- Game attendance: 7,521
- Referee: Jake Grombach
- TV announcers (ESPN+): Blake Gardner (play-by-play), Damian Mitchell (analyst) and Molly Robinson (sideline)

Game information

First Quarter

- (12:14) FUR – Evan James 17-yard run, Ian Williams kick (Drive: 9 plays, 82 yards, 2:43; Furman 7–0)
- (1:21) FUR – Joshua Burrell 7-yard pass from Trey Hedden, Ian Williams kick (Drive: 9 plays, 53 yards, 4:10; Furman 14–0)

Second Quarter

- (9:08) SAM – CJ Evans 25-yard pass from Quincy Crittendon, Ty Ippolito kick (Drive: 8 plays, 83 yards, 2:30; Furman 14–7)
- (0:48) FUR – Raleigh Herbert 47-yard interception, Ian Williams kick (Furman 21–7)

Third Quarter

- (10:37) FUR – Ja'Keith Hamilton 4-yard pass from Trey Hedden, Ian Williams kick (Drive: 5 plays, 50 yards, 2:33; Furman 28–7)
- (1:15) FUR – Ian Williams 40-yard field goal (Drive: 6 plays, 60 yards, 3:09; Furman 31–7)

Fourth Quarter

- (11:52) SAM – Preston Bird 70-yard pass from Quincy Crittendon (Drive: 3 plays, 80 yards, 0:56; Furman 31–13)

Statistics	FUR	SAM
First downs	17	23
Total yards	377	389
Rushing yards	105	70
Passing yards	272	319
Passing: Comp–Att–Int	28–41–0	32–47–2
Time of possession	34:53	25:07

Team	Category	Player	Statistics
Furman	Passing	Trey Hedden	28/41, 272 yards, 2 TD
Furman	Rushing	Gavin Hall	16 carries, 65 yards
Furman	Receiving	Evan James	7 receptions, 88 yards
Samford	Passing	Quincy Crittendon	28/42, 252 yards, 2 TD, INT
Samford	Rushing	Brady Stober	3 carries, 22 yards
Samford	Receiving	Preston Bird	5 receptions, 97 yards, TD

=== East Tennessee State ===
East Tennessee State Buccaneers (2-3) vs. Furman Paladins (3-1) – Game summary

Quarter	1	2	3	4	Total
Buccaneers	8	7	7	0	22
Paladins	7	0	10	14	31

at Paladin Stadium • Greenville, SC

- Date: October 4
- Game time: 2:00 p.m. EDT
- Game weather: Sunny • Temperature: 74 °F (23 °C) • Wind: NE at 7 miles per hour (11 km/h)
- Game attendance: 10,527
- Referee: Brian Hilpisch
- TV announcers (ESPN+): Dan Scott (play-by-play), David Cobb (analyst) and Tom Van Hoy (sideline)

Game information

First Quarter

- (9:30) ETSU – Cole Keller 0-yard punt return, Nate Brackett rush (East Tennessee State 8–0)
- (3:53) FUR – Trey Hedden 1-yard run, Ian Williams kick (Drive: 12 plays, 83 yards, 5:31; East Tennessee State 8–7)

Second Quarter

- (9:42) ETSU – Devontae Houston 1-yard run, Ewan Johnson kick (Drive: 12 plays, 79 yards, 4:35; East Tennessee State 15–7)

Third Quarter

- (14:49) ETSU – Devontae Houston 75-yard run, Ewan Johnson kick (Drive: 1 play, 75 yards, 0:11; East Tennessee State 22–7)
- (11:11) FUR – Ja'Keith Hamilton 10-yard pass from Trey Hedden, Ian Williams kick (Drive: 8 plays, 75 yards, 3:38; East Tennessee State 22–14)
- (6:51) FUR – Ian Williams 44-yard field goal (Drive: 8 plays, 47 yards, 2:47; East Tennessee State 22–17)

Fourth Quarter

- (3:57) FUR – Ja'Keith Hamilton 53-yard pass from Trey Hedden, Luke Clyburn pass (Drive: 5 plays, 76 yards, 2:00; Furman 25–22)
- (0:00) FUR – Jordan Miller 95-yard interception (Furman 31–22)

Statistics	ETSU	FUR
First downs	20	31
Total yards	362	500
Rushing yards	251	142
Passing yards	111	358
Passing: Comp–Att–Int	9–22–1	36–49–1
Time of possession	24:28	35:32

Team	Category	Player	Statistics
East Tennessee State	Passing	Jacolby Criswell	7/14, 100 yards, INT
East Tennessee State	Rushing	Devontae Houston	22 carries, 150 yards, 2 TD
East Tennessee State	Receiving	Hakeem Meggett	1 reception, 42 yards
Furman	Passing	Trey Hedden	36/49, 358 yards, 2 TD, INT
Furman	Rushing	Gavin Hall	23 carries, 101 yards
Furman	Receiving	Ja'Keith Hamilton	11 receptions, 141 yards, 2 TD

=== at Western Carolina ===
Furman Paladins (4-1) vs. Western Carolina Catamounts (3-3) – Game summary

Quarter	1	2	3	4	Total
Paladins	0	7	0	0	7
Catamounts	0	24	14	14	52

at Bob Waters Field at E. J. Whitmire Stadium • Cullowhee, NC

- Date: October 11
- Game time: 2:30 p.m. EDT
- Game weather: Cloudy • Temperature: 70 °F (21 °C) • Wind: N at 5 miles per hour (8.0 km/h)
- Game attendance: 8,375
- Referee: Michael Farmer
- TV announcers (ESPN+): Pete Yanity (play-by-play) and Jay Sonnhalter (analyst)

Game information

First Quarter

No scoring plays

Second Quarter

- (14:23) WCU – Marcus Trout 44-yard field goal (Drive: 7 plays, 18 yards, 2:03; Western Carolina 3–0)
- (10:05) WCU – Michael Rossin 50-yard pass from Taron Dickens, Marcus Trout kick (Drive: 7 plays, 80 yards, 2:18; Western Carolina 10–0)
- (7:39) WCU – Joshua Perry 9-yard pass from Taron Dickens, Marcus Trout kick (Drive: 4 plays, 28 yards, 1:42; Western Carolina 17–0)
- (1:38) WCU – Ken Moore Jr. 64-yard interception, Marcus Trout kick (Western Carolina 24–0)
- (0:13) FUR – Joshua Burrell 8-yard pass from Trey Hedden, Ian Williams kick (Drive: 10 plays, 75 yards, 1:25; Western Carolina 24–7)

Third Quarter

- (13:24) WCU – Malik Knight 41-yard pass from Taron Dickens, Marcus Trout kick (Drive: 5 plays, 75 yards, 1:36; Western Carolina 31–7)
- (5:25) WCU – Markel Townsend 12-yard run, Marcus Trout kick (Drive: 12 plays, 80 yards, 4:55; Western Carolina 38–7)

Fourth Quarter

- (9:35) WCU – Josiah Thomas 6-yard pass from Taron Dickens, Marcus Trout kick (Drive: 9 plays, 83 yards, 4:29; Western Carolina 45–7)
- (6:20) WCU – Isaac Lee 66-yard run, Marcus Trout kick (Drive: 3 plays, 65 yards, 1:28; Western Carolina 52–7)

Statistics	FUR	WCU
First downs	23	23
Total yards	356	522
Rushing yards	137	302
Passing yards	219	220
Passing: Comp–Att–Int	19–38–3	17–24–0
Time of possession	30:16	29:44

Team	Category	Player	Statistics
Furman	Passing	Trey Hedden	18/35, 208 yards, TD, 3 INT
Furman	Rushing	Ben Croasdale	6 carries, 72 yards
Furman	Receiving	Ethan Harris	6 receptions, 95 yards
Western Carolina	Passing	Taron Dickens	17/24, 220 yards, 4 TD
Western Carolina	Rushing	Patrick Boyd Jr.	11 carries, 68 yards
Western Carolina	Receiving	Michael Rossin	2 receptions, 59 yards, TD

=== at Wofford (rivalry) ===
Furman Paladins (4-2) vs. Wofford Terriers (1-5) – Game summary

Quarter	1	2	3	4	Total
Paladins	0	6	7	0	13
Terriers	7	14	0	10	31

at Gibbs Stadium • Spartanburg, SC

- Date: October 18
- Game time: 12:00 p.m. EDT
- Game weather: Sunny • Temperature: 72 °F (22 °C) • Wind: SW at 6 miles per hour (9.7 km/h)
- Game attendance: 3,086
- Referee: Jeff Page
- TV announcers (ESPN+): Pete Yanity (play-by-play), Jay Sonnhalter (analyst) and Dave Friedman (sideline)
- Box Score

Game information

First Quarter

- (8:30) WOF – Colby Alexander 29-yard pass from JT Fayard, Devery Cagle kick (Drive: 7 plays, 85 yards, 3:06; Wofford 7–0)

Second Quarter

- (10:57) FUR – Devin Hester Jr. 10-yard pass from Trey Hedden (Drive: 8 plays, 75 yards, 4:36; Wofford 7–6)
- (3:37) WOF – Terrence Honeywood 23-yard pass from JT Fayard, Sam Spence kick (Drive: 6 plays, 54 yards, 3:25; Wofford 14–6)
- (0:42) WOF – Ihson Jackson-Anderson 1-yard run, Sam Spence kick (Drive: 7 plays, 70 yards, 1:33; Wofford 21–6)

Third Quarter

- (5:10) FUR – Gavin Hall 4-yard run, Ian Williams kick (Drive: 4 plays, 18 yards, 2:12; Wofford 21–13)

Fourth Quarter

- (12:06) WOF – Javario Tinch 66-yard interception, Sam Spence kick (Wofford 28–13)
- (4:16) WOF – Sam Spence 42-yard field goal (Drive: 4 plays, 1 yard, 1:14; Wofford 31–13)

Statistics	FUR	WOF
First downs	16	17
Total yards	329	325
Rushing yards	72	146
Passing yards	257	179
Passing: Comp–Att–Int	27–41–3	18–25–1
Time of possession	32:02	27:58

Team	Category	Player	Statistics
Furman	Passing	Trey Hedden	27/39, 257 yards, TD, 3 INT
Furman	Rushing	Gavin Hall	17 carries, 61 yards, TD
Furman	Receiving	Devin Hester Jr.	6 receptions, 82 yards, TD
Wofford	Passing	JT Fayard	18/25, 179 yards, 2 TD, INT
Wofford	Rushing	Ihson Jackson-Anderson	15 carries, 75 yards, TD
Wofford	Receiving	Isaiah Scott	7 receptions, 91 yards

=== The Citadel (rivalry) ===
The Citadel Bulldogs (3-4) vs. Furman Paladins (4-3) – Game summary

Quarter	1	2	3	4	Total
Bulldogs	0	0	14	0	14
Paladins	6	3	8	7	24

at Paladin Stadium • Greenville, SC

- Date: October 25
- Game time: 2:00 p.m. EDT
- Game weather: Sunny • Temperature: 64 °F (18 °C) • Wind: E at 5 miles per hour (8.0 km/h)
- Game attendance: 10,018
- Referee: Jake Grombach
- TV announcers (ESPN+): Dan Scott (play-by-play), David Cobb (analyst) and Tom Van Hoy (sideline)
- Box Score

Game information

First Quarter

- (11:43) FUR – Ian Williams 45-yard field goal (Drive: 7 plays, 47 yards, 3:17; Furman 3–0)
- (3:56) FUR – Ian Williams 36-yard field goal (Drive: 10 plays, 60 yards, 5:37; Furman 6–0)

Second Quarter

- (1:06) FUR – Ian Williams 21-yard field goal (Drive: 11 plays, 70 yards, 4:48; Furman 9–0)

Third Quarter

- (13:05) CIT – Jihad Marks 46-yard pass from Quentin Hayes, Ben Barnes kick (Drive: 4 plays, 75 yards, 1:55; Furman 9–7)
- (9:43) CIT – Jihad Marks 46-yard pass from Quentin Hayes, Ben Barnes kick (Drive: 3 plays, 58 yards, 1:15; Citadel 14–9)
- (3:30) FUR – Jayquan Smith 2-yard run, Jayquan Smith rush (Drive: 4 plays, 40 yards, 1:58; Furman 17–14)

Fourth Quarter

- (3:21) FUR – Jayquan Smith 7-yard run, Ian Williams kick (Drive: 10 plays, 80 yards, 5:39; Furman 24–14)

Statistics	CIT	FUR
First downs	15	17
Total yards	337	351
Rushing yards	133	140
Passing yards	204	211
Passing: Comp–Att–Int	14–18–0	16–22–0
Time of possession	28:09	31:51

Team	Category	Player	Statistics
The Citadel	Passing	Quentin Hayes	11/15, 194 yards, 2 TD
The Citadel	Rushing	Quentin Hayes	13 carries, 39 yards
The Citadel	Receiving	Jihad Marks	3 receptions, 108 yards, 2 TD
Furman	Passing	Trey Hedden	16/22, 211 yards
Furman	Rushing	Ben Croasdale	19 carries, 91 yards
Furman	Receiving	Evan James	8 receptions, 126 yards

=== No. 15 Mercer ===
No. 15 Mercer Bears (6-1) vs. Furman Paladins (5-3) – Game summary

Quarter	1	2	3	4	Total
No. 15 Bears	7	17	21	7	52
Paladins	13	0	15	0	28

at Paladin Stadium • Greenville, SC

- Date: November 1
- Game time: 2:00 p.m. EDT
- Game weather: Sunny • Temperature: 62 °F (17 °C) • Wind: S at 3 miles per hour (4.8 km/h)
- Game attendance: 7,867
- Referee: Jason Graham
- TV announcers (ESPN+): Dan Scott (play-by-play), David Cobb (analyst) and Tom Van Hoy (sideline)
- Box Score

Game information

First Quarter

- (11:32) FUR - Evan James 14-yard pass from Trey Hedden, Jayquan Smith rush failed (Drive: 3 plays, 20 yards, 1:20; Furman 6-0)
- (7:33) FUR - CJ Nettles 67-yard run, Ian Williams kick (Drive: 3 plays, 85 yards, 4:52; Furman 13-0)
- (2:34) MER - Malik Simmons 21-yard pass from Braden Atkinson, Reice Griffith kick (Drive: 12 plays, 88 yards, 4:52; Furman 13-7)

Second Quarter

- (13:14) MER - CJ Miller 18-yard pass from Braden Atkinson, Reice Griffith kick (Drive: 8 plays, 72 yards, 2:25; Mercer 14-13)
- (6:45) MER - CJ Miller 6-yard run, Reice Griffith kick (Drive: 11 plays, 73 yards, 4:18; Mercer 21-13)
- (1:09) MER - Reice Griffith 44-yard field goal (Drive: 7 plays, 34 yards, 1:10; Mercer 24-13)

Third Quarter

- (14:47) FUR - Caleb Easterling 100-yard kickoff return, Ian Williams kick (Mercer 21-16)
- (13:34) MER - Adjatay Dabbs 63-yard pass from Braden Atkinson, Reice Griffith kick (Drive: 3 plays, 75 yards, 1:13; Mercer 28-16)
- (12:41) FUR - Ja'Keith Hamilton 64-yard pass from Trey Hedden, Kerry King pass (Drive: 3 plays, 66 yards, 0:48; Mercer 31-28)
- (8:45) MER - Braden Atkinson 1-yard run, Reice Griffith kick (Drive: 7 plays, 79 yards, 3:52; Mercer 38-28)
- (5:46) MER - CJ Miller 1-yard run, Reice Griffith kick (Drive: 3 plays, 45 yards, 0:47; Mercer 45-28)

Fourth Quarter

- (13:43) MER - Adonis McDaniel 37-yard pass from Braden Atkinson, Reice Griffith kick (Drive: 12 plays, 85 yards, 5:21; Mercer 52-28)

Statistics	MER	FUR
First downs	36	8
Total yards	628	227
Rushing yards	202	72
Passing yards	426	155
Passing: Comp–Att–Int	28-49-0	12-18-1
Time of possession	37:59	22:01

Team	Category	Player	Statistics
Mercer	Passing	Braden Atkinson	28/49, 426 yards, 4 TD
Mercer	Rushing	CJ Miller	20 carries, 111 yards, 2 TD
Mercer	Receiving	Adonis McDaniel	7 receptions, 139 yards, TD
Furman	Passing	Trey Hedden	12/18, 155 yards, 2 TD, INT
Furman	Rushing	CJ Nettles	15 carries, 105 yards, TD
Furman	Receiving	Ja'Keith Hamilton	1 reception, 64 yards, TD

=== at Chattanooga ===
Furman Paladins (5-4) vs. Chattanooga Mocs (4-5) – Game summary

Quarter	1	2	3	4	Total
Paladins	-	-	-	-	0
Mocs	-	-	-	-	0

at Finley Stadium • Chattanooga, TN

- Date: November 8
- Game time: 12:00 p.m. EST
- TV: ESPN+

Statistics	FUR	UTC
First downs		
Total yards		
Rushing yards		
Passing yards		
Passing: Comp–Att–Int		
Time of possession		

Team	Category	Player	Statistics
Furman	Passing		
Furman	Rushing		
Furman	Receiving		
Chattanooga	Passing		
Chattanooga	Rushing		
Chattanooga	Receiving		

=== VMI ===
VMI Keydets (1-9) vs. Furman Paladins (5-5) – Game summary

Quarter	1	2	3	4	Total
Keydets	-	-	-	-	0
Paladins	-	-	-	-	0

at Paladin Stadium • Greenville, SC

- Date: November 15
- Game time: 1:00 p.m. EST
- TV: ESPN+

Statistics	VMI	FUR
First downs		
Total yards		
Rushing yards		
Passing yards		
Passing: Comp–Att–Int		
Time of possession		

Team	Category	Player	Statistics
VMI	Passing		
VMI	Rushing		
VMI	Receiving		
Furman	Passing		
Furman	Rushing		
Furman	Receiving		

=== at Clemson (FBS) ===
Furman Paladins (5-5) at Clemson Tigers (FBS) (5-5) – Game summary

Quarter	1	2	3	4	Total
Paladins	0	3	7	0	10
Tigers (FBS)	17	14	0	14	45

at Memorial Stadium • Clemson, SC

- Date: November 22
- Game time: 4:30 p.m. EDT
- Game weather: 77 °F (25 °C) • Wind: W @ 10 mph • Weather: Sunny
- Game attendance: 78,403
- Referee: Darryl DeBerry
- TV announcers (The CW): Thom Brennaman (play-by-play), Will Blackmon (analyst) and Wes Bryant (sideline)

Game information

First quarter

- (12:17) CLEM – Nolan Hauser 45-yard field goal, (Drive: 7 plays, 49 yards, 2:43; CLEM 3–0)
- (08:34) CLEM – Antonio Williams 22-yard pass from Cade Klubnik, Nolan Hauser kick, (Drive: 6 plays, 41 yards, 2:29; CLEM 10–0)
- (04:43) CLEM – Tyler Brown 21-yard run, Nolan Hauser kick, (Drive: 5 plays, 80 yards, 2:25; CLEM 17–0)

Second quarter

- (14:15) CLEM – Antonio Williams 35-yard pass from Cade Klubnik, Nolan Hauser kick, (Drive: 2 plays, 46 yards, 0:39; CLEM 24–0)
- (06:48) CLEM – Christian Bentancur 6-yard pass from Christopher Vizzina, Quinn Castner kick, (Drive: 6 plays, 22 yards, 2:11; CLEM 31–0)
- (00:30) FUR – Ian Williams 49-yard field goal, (Drive: 8 plays, 48 yards, 2:16; CLEM 31–3)

Third quarter

- (1:53) FUR – Evan James 19-yard pass from Trey Hedden, Ian Williams kick, (Drive: 6 plays, 55 yards, 4:21; CLEM 31–10)

Fourth quarter

- (07:45) CLEM – Logan Brooking 4-yard pass from Chris Denson, Quinn Castner kick, (Drive: 5 plays, 75 yards, 2:33; CLEM 38–10)
- (00:09) CLEM – Chris Denson 10-yard run, Quinn Castner kick, (Drive: 6 plays, 55 yards, 2:46; CLEM 45–10)

Statistics	FUR	CLEM
First downs	15	23
Plays–yards	70–271	67–456
Rushes–yards	28–66	31–219
Passing yards	205	237
Passing: comp–att–int	25–42–1	23–36–0
Turnovers	1	0
Time of possession	32:07	28:40

Team	Category	Player	Statistics
Furman	Passing	Trey Hedden	22/38, 179 yards, TD, INT
Furman	Rushing	Ben Crosdale	8 carries, 38 yards
Furman	Receiving	Kerry King	6 receptions, 71 yards
Clemson	Passing	Cade Klubnik	9/15, 159 yards, 2 TD
Clemson	Rushing	Chris Denson	6 carries, 106 yards, TD
Clemson	Receiving	Antonio Williams	2 receptions, 57 yards, 2 TD
