= Scot Sloan (American football) =

American college football coach (born 1970)

Current position
- Title: Safeties coach
- Team: Army
- Conference: American

Biographical details
- Born: August 25, 1970 (age 56); Woodruff, South Carolina, U.S.
- Education: Clemson University (1992, 1994); Lincoln Memorial University (2008)

Playing career
- 1989–1991: Clemson
- Position: Defensive end

Coaching career (HC unless noted)
- 1992–1995: Clemson (GA)
- 1996–1999: Georgia Military (DC/DB/RC)
- 2000–2001: Georgia Military (AHC/RC)
- 2002–2005: Georgia Southern (DB)
- 2006: Griffin HS (GA) (DC)
- 2007–2008: Riverside Military Academy (GA) (AHC/DC)
- 2009: Riverside Military Academy (GA)
- 2010: Appalachian State (DB)
- 2011–2016: Appalachian State (DB/RC)
- 2017: Appalachian State (co-DC/DB)
- 2018–2021: Georgia Southern (DC/S)
- 2022: Army (co-DC/S)
- 2023–2024: Appalachian State (DC)
- 2025: Samford (DC)
- 2025: Samford (interim HC)
- 2026–present: Army (S)

Administrative career (AD unless noted)
- 2008–2009: Riverside Military Academy (GA)

Head coaching record
- Overall: 0–2 (college)

Scot Sloan (born August 25, 1970) is an American college football coach and former player. He is the safeties coach for United States Military Academy, a position he has held since 2026. He was the interim head football coach for Samford University in 2025.

== Early life ==
Scot Sloan was born on August 25, 1970, in Woodruff, South Carolina.

== Playing career ==
Sloan played defensive end for the Clemson University Tigers from the 1989 through the 1991 seasons.

== Coaching career ==
After spending four seasons as a graduate assistant at Clemson from 1992 through 1995, Sloan accepted a job as the defensive backs coach, defensive coordinator, and recruiting coordinator at Georgia Military College in 1996. In 2000, he was promoted to assistant head coach while retaining his role of defensive coordinator. In 2002, Sloan accepted the defensive backs coach role at Georgia Southern in Gainesville, Georgia. He moved to high school football in 2006, accepting the defensive back coach and defensive coordinator roles at Griffin High School in Griffin, Georgia. In 2007, he moved to the defensive coordinator, assistant head coach, and athletics director roles at Riverside Military Academy in Gainesville, Georgia. In 2009, he was promoted to head coach while also retaining the role of athletics director.

Sloan began his first tenure at Appalachian State in 2010, when he was hired as the defensive back coach. He retained that role for eight seasons, as well as taking on the additional role of co-defensive coordinator for the 2017 season.

The Mountaineers’ defense excelled on a national level during much of this time period, which also encompassed the team’s move up from the FCS to the FBS. The Mountaineers ranked 12th in the nation with 18 interceptions in 2015. In 2016, Appalachian State ranked 6th in the nation with 20 interceptions and 11th in the nation in pass efficiency defense, while they ranked in the top 20 nationally in interceptions, sacks, and turnover margin in 2017. Overall, during Sloan’s last three seasons at Appalachian State, his defense had 53 interceptions, which was the 2nd most in the nation during that span (trailing only San Diego State).

During this stint with the Mountaineers, Sloan coached and mentored multiple outstanding defensive players, including NCAA Division I FCS All-Americans Mark LeGree (2010) and Demetrius McCray (2011), Appalachian State’s first NCAA Division I FBS Freshman All-American Clifton Duck (2016), and 16 all-conference honorees. LeGree was selected by the Seattle Seahawks in the fifth round of the 2011 NFL draft, while McCray was selected by the Jacksonville Jaguars in the seventh round of the 2013 NFL draft. While undrafted, other defensive players Sloan coached at Appalachian State during this time period who later played in the NFL include safety Doug Middleton, who played six years in the NFL; cornerback Tae Hayes, who has played five years in the NFL so far (as of January 2024); and safeties Alex Gray, A. J. Howard, Austin Exford, and Josh Thomas.

Sloan also served as the recruiting coordinator at Appalachian State from 2011 through 2017. Notably, Appalachian State’s 2017 recruiting class under Sloan was hailed as the nation’s number 13 class in The Athletic’s re-rank four years later.

Sloan returned to Georgia Southern in 2018, serving as the defensive coordinator and safeties coach there through 2021. During his tenure, Sloan’s defenses were nationally highly ranked in many categories. In 2018, the Georgia Southern defense’s 15 interceptions helped them lead the entire FBS with a +22 turnover margin. In 2019, their defense led the Sun Belt Conference in tackles for a loss and fumbles recovered. In 2020, Sloan’s defense was nationally ranked 1st for interceptions (18), 14th in total defense, 14th in rushing defense, and 12th in red zone defense.

Notable defensive players coached by Sloan during this tenure at Georgia Southern include Kindle Vildor, Raymond Johnson III, Derrick Canteen, Joshua Moon, and Donald Rutledge Jr. Vildor and Johnson were All-Americans, while Canteen was a Freshman All-American. Vildor was also selected by the Chicago Bears in the fifth round of the 2020 NFL draft, where he has found continued success. Johnson, Moon, and Rutledge have found moderate success in the NFL and/or continued success in the USFL. (Canteen transferred to Virginia Tech for the 2023 season – his fourth season of eligibility – and thus has not, as of January 2024, attempted to play professional football.)

In 2022, Sloan served as the co-defensive coordinator and safeties coach for Army. Under Sloan, Army’s defense ranked third nationally in passing yards allowed.

On January 13, 2023, Sloan returned to Appalachian State as their defensive coordinator.

On March 3, 2025, Sloan was hired at Samford as their defensive coordinator.

== Personal life ==
Sloan earned a bachelor's degree and a master's degree in 1992 and 1994, respectively, both from Clemson University. He also holds a degree from Lincoln Memorial University.

He and his wife Stephanie (née Crisco) have two sons and two grandchildren.

== Head coaching record ==
=== College ===
Year	Team	Overall	Conference	Standing	Bowl/playoffs
Samford Bulldogs (Southern Conference) (2025)
2025	Samford	0–2 (Note: Sloan was named interim head coach with two weeks remaining in the season following the firing of Chris Hatcher.)	0–0	8th	
Samford:		0–2	0–0		
Total:		0–2			
