= Chris Hatcher (American football) =

American football player and coach (born 1973)

Current position
- Title: Chief of staff
- Team: Tulane
- Conference: American

Biographical details
- Born: February 18, 1973 (age 53); Macon, Georgia, U.S.

Playing career
- 1991–1994: Valdosta State
- Position: Quarterback

Coaching career (HC unless noted)
- 1996: UCF (QB/TE)
- 1997–1998: Kentucky (GA)
- 1999: Kentucky (QB/WR)
- 2000–2006: Valdosta State
- 2007–2009: Georgia Southern
- 2010–2014: Murray State
- 2015–2025: Samford
- 2026–present: Tulane (chief of staff)

Head coaching record
- Overall: 183–116
- Tournaments: 8–5 (NCAA D-II playoffs); 1–3 (NCAA D-I FCS playoffs)

Accomplishments and honors

Championships
- 1 NCAA Division II (2004); 4 GSC (2000–2002, 2004); 1 SoCon (2022)

Awards
- AFCA Division II Coach of the Year (2004); 3× Gulf South Coach of the Year (2000–2002); Harlon Hill Trophy (1994)

Chris Hatcher (born February 18, 1973) is an American football coach and former player. He is the former head football coach at Samford University, a position he held from 2014 to 2025. Hatcher served as the head football coach at Valdosta State University from 2000 to 2006, Georgia Southern University from 2007 to 2009, and Murray State University from 2010 to 2014. His Valdosta State Blazers won the NCAA Division II Football Championship in 2004. Hatcher played college football as a quarterback at Valdosta State from 1991 to 1994.

== Coaching career ==
=== Georgia Southern ===
On November 21, 2009, Georgia Southern Athletic Director, Sam Baker, announced the firing of Hatcher after the 2009 season.

=== Murray State ===
On December 21, 2009, Murray State University Athletic Director, Allen Ward, announced the hiring of Hatcher beginning the 2010 season. In his first year at Murray State Hatcher led the Racers to a 5–3 record in the Ohio Valley Conference (tied for fourth place), and a 6–5 record overall. 2010 was the Racers first winning season since 2004. Went 7–4 in the 2011 season.

=== Samford ===
On December 10, 2014, it was announced that Hatcher would be the new head coach of the Samford Bulldogs. He replaced former Heisman Trophy winner Pat Sullivan, Samford's all-time leader in wins, who resigned mainly for health reasons.

In his first nine seasons as Bulldogs coach, Hatcher has led Samford to a 57–43 record, including three seasons reaching the FCS playoffs and finishing with a top-25 ranking in the FCS coaches' poll. Hatcher's best season at Samford was 2022. The year culminated in an 11–2 record, including a perfect 8–0 Southern Conference mark to give Samford its first ever outright SoCon football conference championship. Hatcher's 2022 Bulldogs also achieved Samford's first FCS playoff game win since 1991, a 48–42 overtime thriller against Southeastern Louisiana.

Under Hatcher, Samford has produced three players selected in the NFL draft. Cornerback James Bradberry, the 62nd overall pick in 2016, has played for the Carolina Panthers, New York Giants, and Philadelphia Eagles, earning Pro Bowl honors with the Giants in 2020. Wide receiver Montrell Washington and defensive back Christian Matthew were fifth and seventh round picks in 2022, respectively. Nose tackle Michael Pierce signed as an undrafted free agent with the Baltimore Ravens in 2016. Pierce was the Ravens' starting nose tackle throughout the 2023 season.

Hatcher was relieved of his head coaching duties at Samford on November 9, 2025 after he started the 2025 season with a 1–9 record.

== Head coaching record ==
Year	Team	Overall	Conference	Standing	Bowl/playoffs	AFCA/STATS^{#}	FCS Coaches^{°}
Valdosta State Blazers (Gulf South Conference) (2000–2006)
2000	Valdosta State	10–2	8–1	1st	L NCAA Division II First Round	8 (South)	
2001	Valdosta State	12–1	9–0	1st	L NCAA Division II Quarterfinal	4	
2002	Valdosta State	14–1	9–0	1st	L NCAA Division II Championship	2	
2003	Valdosta State	10–2	8–1	2nd	L NCAA Division II First Round	7	
2004	Valdosta State	13–1	9–0	1st	W NCAA Division II Championship	1	
2005	Valdosta State	9–3	7–2	T–2nd	L NCAA Division II First Round	14	
2006	Valdosta State	8–2	6–2	T–3rd		14	
Valdosta State:		76–12	56–6				
Georgia Southern Eagles (Southern Conference) (2007–2009)
2007	Georgia Southern	7–4	4–3	T–3rd			
2008	Georgia Southern	6–5	4–4	T–4th			
2009	Georgia Southern	5–6	4–4	T–4th			
Georgia Southern:		18–15	12–11				
Murray State Racers (Ohio Valley Conference) (2010–2014)
2010	Murray State	6–5	5–3	T–4th			
2011	Murray State	7–4	5–3	2nd			
2012	Murray State	5–6	4–4	6th			
2013	Murray State	6–6	4–4	T–5th			
2014	Murray State	3–9	1–7	T–8th			
Murray State:		27–30	17–25				
Samford Bulldogs (Southern Conference) (2015–2025)
2015	Samford	6–5	3–4	T–4th			
2016	Samford	7–5	5–3	4th	L NCAA Division I First Round	23	23
2017	Samford	8–4	6–2	T–2nd	L NCAA Division I First Round	18	17
2018	Samford	6–5	5–3	4th			
2019	Samford	5–7	4–4	T–4th			
2020–21	Samford	4–3	4–3	5th			
2021	Samford	4–7	3–5	7th			
2022	Samford	11–2	8–0	1st	L NCAA Division I Quarterfinal	7	7
2023	Samford	6–5	4–4	T–5th			
2024	Samford	4–7	3–4	5th			
2025	Samford	1–9 (Note: Hatcher was fired with two weeks remaining in the season and Scot Sloan was named as interim head coach.)	1–7				
Samford:		62–59	47–40				
Total:		183–116					
National championship Conference title Conference division title or championship game berth
