= Taron Dickens =

American football player

No. 5 – Northern Illinois Huskies
- Position: Quarterback
- Class: (redshirt) Junior

Personal information
- Listed height: 5 ft 11 in (1.80 m)
- Listed weight: 180 lb (82 kg)

Career information
- High school: Northwestern (Miami, Florida)
- College: Western Carolina (2023–2025); Northern Illinois (2026–present)

Awards and highlights
- SoCon Offensive Player of the Year (2025); First-team All-SoCon (2025)
- Stats at ESPN

Taron Tyger Dickens is an American college football quarterback for the Northern Illinois Huskies. He previously played for the Western Carolina Catamounts.

== Early life ==
Dickens attended Miami Northwestern Senior High School in Miami, Florida. As a junior, he threw for 3,743 yards and 42 touchdowns. During his senior year, Dickens set the record as Miami-Dade County’s all-time leading passer. Following his high school career, he committed to play college football at Western Carolina University.

== College career ==
After playing sparingly as a freshman, Dickens started four games in 2024, throwing for 1,428 yards and 12 touchdowns. He missed the first three games of the 2025 season due to eligibility issues but eventually returned as the starter. Against Samford, he threw for 582 yards and six touchdowns, leading the Catamounts to a 50–35 victory. Against Wofford, Dickens completed 46 consecutive passes, setting the NCAA record for consecutive completions in a single game. He finished the game completing 53 of 56 passes for 378 yards and four touchdowns. Dickens started nine games in 2025, completing 271 passes for 3,508 yards and a single-season school and Southern Conference record, 38 touchdowns. Dickens was also named a finalist for the Walter Payton award. On November 24, 2025, it was reported that Dickens had entered the transfer portal.

On February 15, 2026, Dickens announced his decision to transfer to the University of North Carolina at Chapel Hill to play for the North Carolina Tar Heels. However, he decommitted from North Carolina in May and reentered the transfer portal. On July 3, Dickens announced his commitment to transfer to Northern Illinois University to play for the Northern Illinois Huskies.

=== Statistics ===
Season	Team	Games			Passing								Rushing			
Season	Team	GP	GS	Record	Comp	Att	Pct	Yards	Avg	TD	Int	Rate	Att	Yards	Avg	TD
2023	Western Carolina	2	0	0–0	4	6	66.7	127	21.2	1	0	299.5	6	−6	−1.0	0
2024	Western Carolina	7	4	3–1	127	172	73.8	1,428	8.3	12	3	163.1	58	56	1.0	2
2025	Western Carolina	9	9	7–2	271	365	74.2	3,508	9.6	38	2	188.2	97	321	3.3	1
2026	Northern Illinois	4	2	0–2	84	120	70.0	837	7.0	3	2	133.5	27	−52	−1.9	0
Career		22	15	10–5	486	663	73.3	5,900	8.9	54	7	172.8	188	319	1.7	3
