= 2025 Tennessee Volunteers football team =

American college football season

2025 Tennessee Volunteers football

Music City Bowl, L 28–30 vs. Illinois
- Conference: Southeastern Conference
- Record: 8–5 (4–4 SEC)
- Head coach: Josh Heupel (5th season)
- Offensive coordinator: Joey Halzle (3rd season)
- Offensive scheme: Veer and Shoot
- Defensive coordinator: Tim Banks (5th season)
- Base defense: Multiple 4–2–5
- Home stadium: Neyland Stadium

2025 Southeastern Conference football standings
	Conf.			Overall
Team	W		L	W		L
No. 9 Alabama y^	7	–	1	11	–	4
No. 6 Georgia y$^	7	–	1	12	–	2
No. 3 Ole Miss ^	7	–	1	13	–	2
No. 8 Texas A&M ^	7	–	1	11	–	2
No. 13 Oklahoma ^	6	–	2	10	–	3
No. 12 Texas	6	–	2	10	–	3
No. 15 Vanderbilt	6	–	2	10	–	3
Missouri	4	–	4	8	–	5
Tennessee	4	–	4	8	–	5
LSU	3	–	5	7	–	6
Kentucky	2	–	6	5	–	7
Florida	2	–	6	4	–	8
Auburn	1	–	7	5	–	7
Mississippi State	1	–	7	5	–	8
South Carolina	1	–	7	4	–	8
Arkansas	0	–	8	2	–	10
Championship: Georgia 28, Alabama 7
^ – College Football Playoff participant; $ – Conference champion; y – Championship game participant; Rankings from AP Poll

The 2025 Tennessee Volunteers football team represented the University of Tennessee in the Southeastern Conference (SEC) during the 2025 NCAA Division I FBS football season. The Volunteers were led by head coach Josh Heupel, who was in his fifth year. The team played its home games at Neyland Stadium, located in Knoxville, Tennessee.

The Tennessee Volunteers drew an average home attendance of 101,915, the 6th-highest of all American football teams in the world.

== Offseason ==
=== 2025 NFL draft ===
Round	Pick	Player	Position	Team
1	26	James Pearce Jr.	DE	Atlanta Falcons
2	63	Omarr Norman-Lott	DT	Kansas City Chiefs
4	108	Dont'e Thornton	WR	Las Vegas Raiders
4	126	Dylan Sampson	RB	Cleveland Browns

=== Transfers ===
==== Outgoing ====
Player	Position	Destination
Charlie Browder	TE	East Tennessee State
Ayden Bussell	IOL	Unknown
Christian Charles	S	Virginia
Ryan Darmon	QB	Stephen F. Austin
Christian Harrison	S	Cincinnati
Nico Iamaleava	QB	UCLA
Jayson Jenkins	DL	Florida State
Larry Johnson III	OT	Unknown
Khalifa Keith	RB	Appalachian State
Vysen Lang	IOL	Troy
Nathan Leacock	WR	Purdue
Jordan Matthews	CB	Vanderbilt
Gaston Moore	QB	South Florida
Chas Nimrod	WR	South Florida
Kalib Perry	LB	Louisville
Cameron Seldon	RB	Virginia Tech
Luke Shouse	TE	Unknown
John Slaughter	S	Colorado
Jalen Smith	LB	Mississippi State
Dayton Sneed	WR	North Carolina
Nate Spillman	WR	Charlotte
Holden Staes	TE	Indiana
Jakobe Thomas	S	Miami
Kaleb Webb	WR	Maryland
Squirrel White	WR	Florida State

==== Incoming ====
Player	Position	Former Team
Joey Aguilar	QB	Appalachian State
Amari Jefferson	WR	Alabama
Wendell Moe Jr.	IOL	Arizona
Michael Kostantonov	OL	Central Michigan
Colton Hood	CB	Colorado
Sam Pendleton	IOL	Notre Dame
Josh Schell	DL	Grand Valley State
Star Thomas	RB	Duke

== Schedule ==
Date	Time	Opponent	Rank	Site	TV	Result	Attendance
August 30	12:00 p.m.	vs. Syracuse*	No. 24	Mercedes-Benz Stadium; Atlanta, GA (Aflac Kickoff Game)	ABC	W 45–26	45,918
September 6	3:30 p.m.	East Tennessee State*	No. 22	Neyland Stadium; Knoxville, TN	SECN+/ESPN+	W 72–17	101,915
September 13	3:30 p.m.	No. 6 Georgia	No. 15	Neyland Stadium; Knoxville, TN (rivalry, College GameDay)	ABC	L 41–44 ^{OT}	101,915
September 20	12:45 p.m.	UAB*	No. 15	Neyland Stadium; Knoxville, TN	SECN	W 56–24	101,915
September 27	4:15 p.m.	at Mississippi State	No. 15	Davis Wade Stadium; Starkville, MS	SECN	W 41–34 ^{OT}	60,417
October 11	4:15 p.m.	Arkansas	No. 12	Neyland Stadium; Knoxville, TN	SECN	W 34–31	101,915
October 18	7:30 p.m.	at No. 6 Alabama	No. 11	Bryant–Denny Stadium; Tuscaloosa, AL (Third Saturday in October)	ABC	L 20–37	100,077
October 25	7:45 p.m.	at Kentucky	No. 17	Kroger Field; Lexington, KY (rivalry)	SECN	W 56–34	60,153
November 1	7:30 p.m.	No. 18 Oklahoma	No. 14	Neyland Stadium; Knoxville, TN	ABC	L 27–33	101,915
November 15	4:15 p.m.	New Mexico State*^{†}	No. 23	Neyland Stadium; Knoxville, TN	SECN	W 42–9	101,915
November 22	7:30 p.m.	at Florida	No. 20	Ben Hill Griffin Stadium; Gainesville, FL (rivalry)	ABC	W 31–11	90,465
November 29	3:30 p.m.	No. 14 Vanderbilt	No. 19	Neyland Stadium; Knoxville, TN (rivalry)	ESPN	L 24–45	101,915
December 30	5:30 p.m.	vs. Illinois*		Nissan Stadium; Nashville, TN (Music City Bowl)	ESPN	L 28–30	52,815
*Non-conference game; ^{†}Homecoming; Rankings from AP Poll (and CFP Rankings, after November 4) - Released prior to game; All times are in Eastern time

== Rankings ==
Ranking movements Legend: ██ Increase in ranking ██ Decrease in ranking — = Not ranked RV = Received votes
	Week																
Poll	Pre	1	2	3	4	5	6	7	8	9	10	11	12	13	14	15	Final
AP	24	22	15	15	15	15	12	11	17	14	23	21	20	18	RV	RV	RV
Coaches	18	17	15	15	15	15	12	11	17	14	22	20	20	18	24	23	RV
CFP	Not released										25	23	20	19	—	—	Not released

== Game summaries ==
=== vs. Syracuse ===
Syracuse Orange (0–0) vs. No. 24 Tennessee Volunteers (0–0) – Game summary

Quarter	1	2	3	4	Total
Orange	0	14	6	6	26
No. 24 Volunteers	17	14	7	7	45

at Mercedes-Benz Stadium • Atlanta, Georgia

- Date: August 30
- Game time: 12:00 p.m.
- Game weather: Indoors
- Game attendance: 45,918
- Referee: Ron Snodgrass
- TV announcers (ABC): Bob Wischusen (play-by-play), Louis Riddick (analyst), and Kris Budden (sideline)

Game information

First quarter

- TENN – Max Gilbert 34-yard field goal, 12:46. Volunteers 3–0. Drive: 9 plays, 59 yards, 2:14.
- TENN – Peyton Lewis 2-yard run (Max Gilbert kick), 6:02. Volunteers 10–0. Drive: 12 plays, 85 yards, 3:35.
- TENN – Colton Hood 22-yard fumble return (Max Gilbert kick), 0:56. Volunteers 17–0.

Second quarter

- SYR – Yasin Willis 2-yard run (Tripp Woody kick), 11:40. Volunteers 17–7. Drive: 11 plays, 75 yards, 4:16.
- TENN – Braylon Staley 73-yard pass from Joey Aguilar (Max Gilbert kick), 11:14. Volunteers 24–7. Drive: 2 plays, 75 yards, 0:26.
- SYR – Johntay Cook II 3-yard pass from Steve Angeli (Tripp Woody kick), 1:55. Volunteers 24–14. Drive: 9 plays, 49 yards, 3:38.
- TENN – DeSean Bishop 1-yard run (Max Gilbert kick), 0:21. Volunteers 31–14. Drive: 6 plays, 75 yards, 1:34.

Third quarter

- TENN – Star Thomas 7-yard pass from Joey Aguilar (Max Gilbert kick), 12:22. Volunteers 38–14. Drive: 7 plays, 17 yards, 2:27.
- SYR – Yasin Willis 1-yard run (pass failed), 7:33. Volunteers 38–20. Drive: 12 plays, 75 yards, 4:49.

Fourth quarter

- SYR – Yasin Willis 1-yard run (run failed), 11:54. Volunteers 38–26. Drive: 14 plays, 88 yards, 5:19.
- TENN – Miles Kitselman 2-yard pass from Joey Aguilar (Max Gilbert kick), 3:57. Volunteers 45–26. Drive: 9 plays, 54 yards, 4:42.

Statistics	SYR	TENN
First downs	24	22
Plays–yards	84–377	67–495
Rushes–yards	44–103	39–248
Passing yards	274	247
Passing: comp–att–int	23–40–1	16–28–0
Turnovers	2	1
Time of possession	34:31	25:29

Team	Category	Player	Statistics
Syracuse	Passing	Steve Angeli	23/40, 274 yards, TD, INT
Syracuse	Rushing	Yasin Willis	23 carries, 91 yards, 3 TD
Syracuse	Receiving	Dan Villari	5 receptions, 55 yards
Tennessee	Passing	Joey Aguilar	16/28, 247 yards, 3 TD
Tennessee	Rushing	Star Thomas	12 carries, 92 yards
Tennessee	Receiving	Braylon Staley	4 receptions, 95 yards, TD

=== vs East Tennessee State (FCS) ===
East Tennessee State Buccaneers (FCS) (1–0) at No. 22 Tennessee Volunteers (1–0) – Game summary

Quarter	1	2	3	4	Total
Buccaneers (FCS)	0	7	3	7	17
No. 22 Volunteers	24	24	14	10	72

at Neyland Stadium • Knoxville, Tennessee

- Date: September 6
- Game time: 3:30 p.m.
- Game weather: Rainy • Temperature: 72 °F (22 °C)
- Game attendance: 101,915
- Referee: Ken Williamson
- TV announcers (SECN+/ESPN+): Matt Schumacker (play-by-play), Dustin Fox (analyst), and Stephanie Otey (sideline)

Game information

First quarter

- TENN – Chris Brazzell II 21-yard pass from Joey Aguilar (Max Gilbert kick), 13:08. Volunteers 7–0. Drive: 6 plays, 82 yards, 1:46.
- TENN – Max Gilbert 29-yard field goal, 9:28. Volunteers 10–0. Drive: 7 plays, 38 yards, 2:13.
- TENN – Star Thomas 2-yard run (Max Gilbert kick), 7:07. Volunteers 17–0. Drive: 4 plays, 27 yards, 1:17.
- TENN – Peyton Lewis 1-yard run (Max Gilbert kick), 0:46. Volunteers 24–0. Drive: 3 plays, 5 yards, 1:09.

Second quarter

- TENN – Star Thomas 2-yard run (Max Gilbert kick), 11:41. Volunteers 31–0. Drive: 9 plays, 58 yards, 3:09.
- TENN – Max Gilbert 37-yard field goal, 8:03. Volunteers 34–0. Drive: 6 plays, 26 yards, 1:57.
- TENN – Mike Matthews 53-yard pass from Joey Aguilar (Max Gilbert kick), 4:08. Volunteers 41–0. Drive: 6 plays, 80 yards, 1:30.
- ETSU – Taharin Sudderth 5-yard pass from Cade McNamara (Ewan Johnson kick), 1:55. Volunteers 41–7. Drive: 1 play, 5 yards, 0:06.
- TENN – Star Thomas 7-yard run (Max Gilbert kick), 0:22. Volunteers 48–7. Drive: 8 plays, 75 yards, 1:33.

Third quarter

- ETSU – Ewan Johnson 41-yard field goal, 11:52. Volunteers 48–10. Drive: 8 plays, 51 yards, 3:08.
- TENN – Chris Brazell II 1-yard pass from Jake Merklinger (Josh Turbyville kick), 8:45. Volunteers 55–10. Drive: 10 plays, 75 yards, 3:07.
- TENN – Jack Van Dorselaer 7-yard pass from Jake Merklinger (Josh Turbyville kick), 2:45. Volunteers 62–10. Drive: 9 plays, 67 yards, 3:22.

Fourth quarter

- TENN – Max Gilbert 53-yard field goal, 10:43. Volunteers 65–10. Drive: 12 plays, 41 yards, 4:57.
- ETSU – Jason Albritton 20-yard run (Ewan Johnson kick), 8:46. Volunteers 65–17. Drive: 6 plays, 75 yards, 1:57.
- TENN – Daune Morris 10-yard run (Josh Turbyville kick), 3:55. Volunteers 72–17. Drive: 11 plays, 75 yards, 4:51.

Statistics	ETSU	TENN
First downs	10	41
Plays–yards	59–216	99–734
Rushes–yards	28–49	47–276
Passing yards	167	458
Passing: comp–att–int	19–31–0	38–52–0
Turnovers	0	0
Time of possession	24:58	35:02

Team	Category	Player	Statistics
East Tennessee State	Passing	Cade McNamara	11/18, 85 yards, TD
East Tennessee State	Rushing	Jason Albritton	4 carries, 30 yards, TD
East Tennessee State	Receiving	Cole Keller	3 receptions, 47 yards
Tennessee	Passing	Joey Aguilar	23/31, 288 yards, 2 TD
Tennessee	Rushing	Star Thomas	12 carries, 69 yards, 3 TD
Tennessee	Receiving	Chris Brazzell II	9 receptions, 125 yards, 2 TD

=== vs No. 6 Georgia (rivalry) ===
No. 6 Georgia Bulldogs (2–0) at No. 15 Tennessee Volunteers (2–0) – Game summary

Quarter	1	2	3	4	OT	Total
No. 6 Bulldogs	7	10	10	11	6	44
No. 15 Volunteers	21	0	7	10	3	41

at Neyland Stadium • Knoxville, Tennessee

- Date: September 13
- Game time: 3:30 p.m.
- Game weather: Sunny • Temperature: 85 °F (29 °C)
- Game attendance: 101,915
- Referee: Steve Marlowe
- TV announcers (ABC): Chris Fowler (play-by-play), Kirk Herbstreit (analyst), and Holly Rowe (sideline)

Game information

First quarter

- (12:30) TENN – Joey Aguilar 4 yard run, Max Gilbert kick (Drive: 8 plays, 75 yards, 2:30; Tennessee 7–0)
- (9:58) UGA – Gunner Stockton 6 yard run, Peyton Woodring kick (Drive: 6 plays, 75 yards, 2:32; Tied 7–7)
- (9:29) TENN – Chris Brazzell II 72 yard pass from Joey Aguilar, Max Gilbert kick (Drive: 2 plays, 75 yards, 0:29; Tennessee 14–7)
- (3:37) TENN – Chris Brazzell II 14 yard pass from Joey Aguilar, Max Gilbert kick (Drive: 11 plays, 83 yards, 4:57; Tennessee 21–7)

Second quarter

- (14:52) UGA – Zachariah Branch 36 yard pass from Gunner Stockton, Peyton Woodring kick (Drive: 9 plays, 72 yards, 3:45; Tennessee 21–14)
- (1:42) UGA – Peyton Woodring 20 yard field goal (Drive: 14 plays, 88 yards, 6:15; Tennessee 21–17)

Third quarter

- (7:19) UGA – Josh McCray 1 yard run, Peyton Woodring kick (Drive: 14 plays, 75 yards, 7:41; Georgia 24–21)
- (1:45) UGA – Peyton Woodring 48 yard field goal (Drive: 4 plays, 7 yards, 2:03; Georgia 27–21)
- (0:07) TENN – Chris Brazzell II 56 yard pass from Joey Aguilar, Max Gilbert kick (Drive: 5 plays, 75 yards, 1:38; Tennessee 28–27)

Fourth quarter

- (12:17) UGA – Peyton Woodring 24 yard field goal (Drive: 8 plays, 69 yards, 2:50; Georgia 30–28)
- (11:01) TENN – Braylon Staley II 32 yard pass from Joey Aguilar, Max Gilbert kick (Drive: 4 plays, 75 yards, 1:16; Tennessee 35–30)
- (6:40) TENN – Max Gilbert 48 yard field goal (Drive: 4 plays, 4 yards, 1:41; Tennessee 38–30)
- (2:32) UGA – London Humphreys 28 yard pass from Gunner Stockton, (Gunner Stockton pass to Zachariah Branch) (Drive: 9 plays, 75 yards, 4:08; Tied 38–38)

Overtime

- TENN – Max Gilbert 42 yard field goal (Drive: 4 plays, 1 yard; Tennessee 41–38)
- UGA – Josh McCray 1 yard run (Drive: 3 plays, 25 yards; Georgia 44–41)

Statistics	UGA	TENN
First downs	28	23
Plays–yards	87–502	70–496
Rushes–yards	55–198	34–125
Passing yards	304	371
Passing: comp–att–int	23–32–1	24–36–2
Turnovers	2	2
Time of possession	50:38	24:15

Team	Category	Player	Statistics
Georgia	Passing	Gunner Stockton	23/31, 304 yards, 2 TD
Georgia	Rushing	Nate Frazier	14 carries, 73 yards
Georgia	Receiving	Colbie Young	4 receptions, 73 yards
Tennessee	Passing	Joey Aguilar	24/36, 371 yards, 4 TD, 2 INT
Tennessee	Rushing	Star Thomas	9 carries, 60 yards
Tennessee	Receiving	Chris Brazzell II	6 receptions, 177 yards, 3 TD

=== vs UAB ===
UAB Blazers (2–1) at No. 15 Tennessee Volunteers (2–1) – Game summary

Quarter	1	2	3	4	Total
Blazers	0	7	10	7	24
No. 15 Volunteers	21	21	14	0	56

at Neyland Stadium • Knoxville, Tennessee

- Date: September 20
- Game time: 12:45 p.m.
- Game weather: Sunny • Temperature: 80 °F (27 °C)
- Game attendance: 101,915
- Referee: Daniel Gautreaux
- TV announcers (SECN): Taylor Zarzour (play-by-play), Matt Stinchcomb (analyst), and Alyssa Lang (sideline)

Game information

First quarter

- (12:30) TENN – Chris Brazzell II 19 yard pass from Joey Aguilar, Max Gilbert kick (Drive: 7 plays, 75 yards, 2:04; Tennessee 7–0)
- (11:05) TENN – Mike Matthews 19 yard pass from Joey Aguilar, Max Gilbert kick (Drive: 2 plays, 59 yards, 0:25; Tennessee 14–0)
- (4:01) TENN – DeSean Bishop 3 yard run, Max Gilbert kick (Drive: 5 plays, 45 yards, 1:26; Tennessee 21–0)

Second quarter

- (10:44) TENN – Star Thomas 1 yard run, Max Gilbert kick (Drive: 10 plays, 60 yards, 3:25; Tennessee 28–0)
- (7:34) UAB – Brandon Hawkins Jr. 30 yard pass from Jalen Kitna, Jonah Delange kick (Drive: 10 plays, 75 yards, 3:10; Tennessee 28–7)
- (2:50) TENN – Peyton Lewis 32 yard run, Max Gilbert kick (Drive: 12 plays, 75 yards, 4:44; Tennessee 35–7)
- (0:32) TENN – DeSean Bishop 2 yard run, Max Gilbert kick (Drive: 4 plays, 33 yards, 1:14; Tennessee 42–7)

Third quarter

- (12:06) UAB – Jonah Delange 45 yard field goal (Drive: 4 plays, 4 yards, 1:17; Tennessee 42–10)
- (9:53) TENN – Star Thomas 17 yard pass from Joey Aguilar, Max Gilbert kick (Drive: 5 plays, 54 yards, 2:03; Tennessee 49–10)
- (2:37) TENN – Kaleb Beasley 23 yard fumble recovery, Max Gilbert kick (Tennessee 56–10)

Fourth quarter

- (1:24) UAB – Kaleb Brown 61 yard pass from Jalen Kitna, Jonah Delange kick (Drive: 3 plays, 75 yards, 1:13; Tennessee 56–17)
- (0:48) UAB – Isaiah Jacobs 1 yard run, Jonah Delange kick (Drive: 14 plays, 82 yards, 6:48; Tennessee 56–24)

Statistics	UAB	TENN
First downs	18	29
Plays–yards	71–394	73–510
Rushes–yards	19–23	43–235
Passing yards	371	275
Passing: comp–att–int	39–53–1	18–30–1
Turnovers	2	2
Time of possession	33:52	26:08

Team	Category	Player	Statistics
UAB	Passing	Jalen Kitna	38/51, 364 yards, 2 TD, INT
UAB	Rushing	Isaiah Jacobs	6 carries, 19 yards, TD
UAB	Receiving	Kaleb Brown	4 receptions, 79 yards, TD
Tennessee	Passing	Joey Aguilar	15/22, 218 yards, 3 TD, INT
Tennessee	Rushing	Peyton Lewis	11 carries, 81 yards, TD
Tennessee	Receiving	Chris Brazzell II	5 receptions, 62 yards, TD

=== at Mississippi State ===
No. 15 Tennessee Volunteers (3–1) at Mississippi State Bulldogs (4–0) – Game summary

Quarter	1	2	3	4	OT	Total
No. 15 Volunteers	10	7	3	14	7	41
Bulldogs	7	10	7	10	0	34

at Davis Wade Stadium • Starkville, Mississippi

- Date: September 27
- Game time: 4:20 p.m.
- Game weather: Sunny • Temperature: 83 °F (28 °C)
- Game attendance: 60,417
- Referee: David Smith
- TV announcers (SECN): Dave Neal (play-by-play), Fozzy Whittaker (analyst), and Morgan Uber (sideline)

Game information

First quarter

- 11:49 MSU – Fluff Bothwell 5-yard run, Kyle Ferrie kick (Drive: 5 plays , 20 yards, 01:38; MSU 7–0)
- 09:19 TENN – Max Gilbert 38-yard field goal (Drive: 7 plays, 55 yards, 02:30; MSU 7–3)
- 04:19 TENN – Colton Hood 23-yard interception return, Max Gilbert kick (TENN 10–7)

Second quarter

- 13:53 MSU – Davon Booth 5-yard run, Kyle Ferrie kick (Drive: 15 plays, 75 yards, 05:26; MSU 14–10)
- 08:41 MSU – Kyle Ferrie 51-yard field goal (Drive: 8 plays, 51 yards, 03:10, MSU 17–10)
- 07:25 TENN – Chris Brazzell II 15-yard pass from Joey Aguilar, Max Gilbert kick (Drive: 4 plays, 75 yards, 01:16; Tied 17–17

Third quarter

- 11:28 TENN – Max Gilbert 27-yard field goal (Drive: 10 plays 66 yards, 03:32; TENN 20–17
- 03:48 MSU – Fluff Bothwell 1-yard run, Kyle Ferrie kick (Drive: 4 plays, 26 yards, 01:01; MSU 24–20)

Fourth quarter

- 13:29 TENN – Joshua Josephs 41-yard fumble return, Max Gilbert kick (TENN 27–24)
- 10:31 MSU – Kyle Ferrie 38-yard field goal (Drive: 6 plays, 54 yards, 02:58; Tied 27–27)
- 07:59 MSU –Seydou Traore 2-yard pass from Blake Shapen, Kyle Ferrie kick (Drive: 5 plays, 17 yards, 01:44; MSU 34–27)
- 01:55 TENN – Joey Aguilar 6-yard run, Max Gilbert kick (Drive: 13 plays, 75 yards, 06:04; Tied 34–34

Overtime

- TENN – DeSean Bishop 25-yard run, Max Gilbert kick (Drive: 1 play, 25 yards; TENN 41–34)

Statistics	TENN	MSST
First downs	24	24
Plays–yards	72–466	86–378
Rushes–yards	32–131	57–198
Passing yards	335	180
Passing: comp–att–int	24–40–2	18–29–1
Turnovers	3	2
Time of possession	27:37	32:23

Team	Category	Player	Statistics
Tennessee	Passing	Joey Aguilar	24/40, 335 yards, TD, 2 INT
Tennessee	Rushing	DeSean Bishop	11 carries, 72 yards, TD
Tennessee	Receiving	Chris Brazzell II	6 receptions, 105 yards, TD
Mississippi State	Passing	Blake Shapen	18/29, 189 yards, TD, INT
Mississippi State	Rushing	Fluff Bothwell	23 carries, 135 yards, 2 TD
Mississippi State	Receiving	Seydou Traore	4 receptions, 40 yards, TD

=== vs Arkansas ===
Arkansas Razorbacks (2–3) at No. 12 Tennessee Volunteers (4–1) – Game summary

Quarter	1	2	3	4	Total
Razorbacks	10	7	0	14	31
No. 12 Volunteers	7	10	10	7	34

at Neyland Stadium • Knoxville, Tennessee

- Date: October 11
- Game time: 4:15 p.m.
- Game weather: Sunny • Temperature: 73 °F (23 °C)
- Game attendance: 101,915
- Referee: James Carter
- TV announcers (SECN): Dave Neal (play-by-play), Fozzy Whittaker (analyst), and Morgan Uber (sideline)

Game information

First quarter

- 10:10 ARK – Taylen Green 11-yard run, Scott Starzyk kick (Drive: 9 plays , 75 yards, 04:50; ARK 7–0)
- 07:39 TENN – DeSean Bishop 17-yard run, Max Gilbert kick (Drive: 7 plays, 75 yards, 02:31; Tied 7–7)
- 00:20 ARK – Scott Starzyk 28-yard field goal (Drive: 11 plays, 70 yards, 05:44; ARK 10–7)

Second quarter

- 10:36 TENN – Max Gilbert 27-yard field goal (Drive: 12 plays, 57 yards, 04:44; Tied 10–10)
- 04:36 ARK – Mike Washington 1-yard run, Scott Starzyk kick (Drive: 11 plays, 75 yards, 05:59; ARK 17–10)
- 02:52 TENN – Miles Kitselman 8-yard pass from Joey Aguilar, Max Gilbert kick (Drive: 5 plays, 75 yards, 01:44; Tied 17–17)

Third quarter

- 11:50 TENN – Max Gilbert 50-yard field goal (Drive: 9 plays, 43 yards, 03:10; TENN 20–17)
- 02:11 TENN – Peyton Lewis 2-yard run, Joey Aguilar kick (Drive: 6 plays, 74 yards, 01:50; TENN 27–17)

Fourth quarter

- 13:14 TENN – Peyton Lewis 3-yard run, Max Gilbert kick (Drive: 4 plays, 19 yards, 01:31; TENN 34–17)
- 08:17 ARK – Rohan Jones 9-yard pass from T Green, Scott Starzyk kick (Drive: 10 plays, 81 yards, 04:53; TENN 34–24)
- 02:55 ARK – Kam Shanks 12-yard pass from Taylen Green, Scott Starzyk kick (Drive: 7 plays, 80 yards, 01:13; TENN 34–31)

Statistics	ARK	TENN
First downs	29	22
Plays–yards	76–496	65–485
Rushes–yards	45–240	40–264
Passing yards	256	221
Passing: comp–att–int	21–31–0	16–25–0
Turnovers	3	0
Time of possession	34:55	25:05

Team	Category	Player	Statistics
Arkansas	Passing	Taylen Green	21/31, 256 yards, 2 TD
Arkansas	Rushing	Mike Washington	19 carries, 135 yards, TD
Arkansas	Receiving	Raylen Sharpe	7 receptions, 76 yards
Tennessee	Passing	Joey Aguilar	16/25, 221 yards, TD
Tennessee	Rushing	DeSean Bishop	14 carries, 150 yards, TD
Tennessee	Receiving	Braylon Staley	6 receptions, 109 yards

=== at No. 6 Alabama (Third Saturday in October) ===
No. 11 Tennessee Volunteers (5–1) at No. 6 Alabama Crimson Tide (5–1) – Game summary

Quarter	1	2	3	4	Total
No. 11 Volunteers	0	7	6	7	20
No. 6 Crimson Tide	7	16	7	7	37

at Bryant–Denny Stadium • Tuscaloosa, Alabama

- Date: October 18
- Game time: 6:30 p.m.
- Game weather: Cloudy • Temperature: 82 °F (28 °C) • Wind: NW at 10 miles per hour (16 km/h)
- Game attendance: 100,077
- Referee: Jeff Heaser
- TV announcers (ABC): Sean McDonough (play-by-play), Greg McElroy (analyst), and Molly McGrath (sideline)

Game information

First quarter

- ALA - Isaiah Horton 2-yard pass from Ty Simpson (Conor Talty kick), 6:51. Crimson Tide 7-0. Drive: 11 plays, 91 yards, 6:02.

Second quarter

- TENN - Braylon Staley 2-yard pass from Joey Aguilar (Max Gilbert kick), 9:46. Tied 7-7. Drive: 10 plays, 78 yards, 4:14.
- ALA - Team Safety, 7:27. Crimson Tide 9-7.
- ALA - Jam Miller 1-yard run (Conor Talty kick), 4:05. Crimson Tide 16-7. Drive: 7 plays, 69 yards, 3:22.
- ALA - Zabien Brown 99-yard interception return (Conor Talty kick), 0:00. Crimson Tide 23-7.

Third quarter

- TENN - DeSean Bishop 44-yard run (Two-Point pass Conversion failed), 11:18. Crimson Tide 23-13. Drive: 4 plays, 61 yards, 1:39.
- ALA - Rico Scott 11-yard pass from Ty Simpson (Conor Talty Kick), 0:25. Crimson Tide 30-13. Drive: 9 plays, 99 yards, 5:26.

Fourth quarter

- TENN - DeSean Bishop 1-yard run (Max Gilbert kick), 10:51. Crimson Tide 30-20. Drive: 13 plays, 75 yards, 4:34.
- ALA - Daniel Hill 4-yard run (Conor Talty kick), 5:49. Crimson Tide 37-20. Drive: 10 plays, 75 yards, 5:02.

Statistics	TENN	ALA
First downs	27	23
Plays–yards	77–410	61–373
Rushes–yards	33–142	32–120
Passing yards	268	253
Passing: comp–att–int	28–44–1	19–29–0
Turnovers	1	1
Time of possession	28:56	31:04

Team	Category	Player	Statistics
Tennessee	Passing	Joey Aguilar	28/44, 268 yards, TD, INT
Tennessee	Rushing	DeSean Bishop	14 carries, 123 yards, 2 TD
Tennessee	Receiving	Braylon Staley	10 receptions, 92 yards, TD
Alabama	Passing	Ty Simpson	19/29, 253 yards, 2 TD
Alabama	Rushing	Germie Bernard	4 carries, 49 yards
Alabama	Receiving	Ryan Coleman-Williams	5 receptions, 87 yards

=== at Kentucky (rivalry) ===
No. 17 Tennessee Volunteers (5–2) at Kentucky Wildcats (2–4) – Game summary

Quarter	1	2	3	4	Total
No. 17 Volunteers	21	14	14	7	56
Wildcats	7	14	6	7	34

at Kroger Field • Lexington, Kentucky

- Date: October 25
- Game time: 7:45 p.m.
- Game weather: Cloudy • Temperature: 53 °F (12 °C)
- Game attendance: 60,153
- Referee: Kyle Olson
- TV announcers (SECN): Tom Hart (play-by-play), Jordan Rodgers (analyst), and Cole Cubelic (sideline)

Game information

First quarter

- TENN - Chris Brazzell II 35-yard pass from Joey Aguilar (Max Gilbert kick), 13:41. Volunteers 7-0. Drive: 4 plays, 75 yards, 1:19.
- TENN - Edrees Farooq 45-yard interception return (Max Gilbert kick), 6:56. Volunteers 14-0.
- UK - Kendrick Law 71-yard pass from Cutter Boley (Jacob Kauwe kick), 6:19. Volunteers 14-7. Drive: 2 plays, 75 yards, 0:37.
- TENN - Star Thomas 1-yard run (Max Gilbert kick), 1:49. Volunteers 21-7. Drive: 5 plays, 72 yards, 2:11.

Second quarter

- TENN - DeSean Bishop 1-yard run (Max Gilbert kick), 13:52. Volunteers 28-7. Drive: 4 plays, 6 yards, 1:15.
- UK - DJ Miller 56-yard pass from Cutter Boley (Jacob Kauwe kick), 12:39. Volunteers 28-14. Drive: 3 plays, 75 yards, 1:13.
- UK - J.J. Hester 3-yard pass from Cutter Boley (Jacob Kauwe kick), 1:37. Volunteers 28-21. Drive: 16 plays, 96 yards, 8:35.
- TENN - Ethan Davis 13-yard pass from Joey Aguilar (Max Gilbert kick), 0:05. Volunteers 35-21. Drive: 10 plays, 75 yards, 1:32.

Third quarter

- TENN - Mike Matthews 62-yard pass from Joey Aguilar (Max Gilbert kick), 10:40. Volunteers 42-21. Drive: 2 plays, 70 yards, 0:25.
- TENN - Peyton Lewis 2-yard run (Max Gilbert kick), 5:46. Volunteers 49-21. Drive: 5 plays, 63 yards, 1:29.
- UK - DJ Miller 28-yard pass from Cutter Boley (Two-Point pass Conversion failed), 0:54. Volunteers 49-27. Drive: 10 plays, 75 yards, 4:52.

Fourth quarter

- TENN - DeSean Bishop 5-yard run (Max Gilbert kick), 13:35. Volunteers 56-27. Drive: 6 plays, 75 yards, 2:19.
- UK - J.J. Hester 7-yard pass from Cutter Boley (Jacob Kauwe kick), 8:12. Volunteers 56-34. Drive: 11 plays, 75 yards, 5:23.

Statistics	TENN	UK
First downs	24	25
Plays–yards	59–504	73–476
Rushes–yards	33–108	38–146
Passing yards	396	330
Passing: comp–att–int	20–26–0	26–36–1
Turnovers	0	2
Time of possession	23:56	36:03

Team	Category	Player	Stat7stics
Tennessee	Passing	Joey Aguilar	20/26, 396 yards, 3 TD
Tennessee	Rushing	Star Thomas	10 carries, 64 yards, TD
Tennessee	Receiving	Chris Brazzell II	4 receptions, 138 yards, TD
Kentucky	Passing	Cutter Boley	26/35, 330 yards, 5 TD, INT
Kentucky	Rushing	Dante Dowdell	12 carries, 52 yards
Kentucky	Receiving	DJ Miller	5 receptions, 120 yards, 2 TD

=== vs No. 18 Oklahoma ===
No. 18 Oklahoma Sooners (6–2) at No. 14 Tennessee Volunteers (6–2) – Game summary

Quarter	1	2	3	4	Total
No. 18 Sooners	7	9	7	10	33
No. 14 Volunteers	10	0	7	10	27

at Neyland Stadium • Knoxville, Tennessee

- Date: November 1
- Game time: 7:30 p.m.
- Game weather: clear • Temperature: 56 °F
- Game attendance: 101,915
- Referee: Jason Autrey
- TV announcers (ABC): Chris Fowler (play-by-play), Kirk Herbstreit (analyst), and Holly Rowe (sideline)

Game information

First quarter

- (11:17) TENN – Braylon Staley 5-yard pass from Joey Aguilar, Max Gilbert kick (Drive: 9 plays, 75 yards, 3:43; TENN 7–0)
- (8:01) OU – R Mason Thomas 71-yard fumble recovery, Tate Sandell kick (Drive: 5 plays, -16 yards, 1:29; Tied 7–7)
- (3:30) TENN – Max Gilbert 45-yard field goal (Drive: 11 plays, 48 yards, 4:31; TENN 10–7)

Second quarter

- (7:36) OU – Tate Sandell 55-yard field goal (Drive: 8 plays, 43 yards, 3:38; Tied 10–10)
- (1:08) OU – Tate Sandell 51-yard field goal (Drive: 7 plays, 26 yards, 2:33; OU 13–10)
- (0:00) OU – Tate Sandell 40-yard field goal (Drive: 3 plays, 6 yards, 0:16; OU 16–10)

Third quarter

- (11:52) TENN – Braylon Staley 54-yard pass from Joey Aguilar, Max Gilbert kick (Drive: 5 plays, 83 yards, 1:18; TENN 17–16)
- (2:03) OU – Xavier Robinson 4-yard run, Tate Sandell kick (Drive: 5 plays, 52 yards, 2:48; OU 23–17)

Fourth quarter

- (11:05) OU – Tate Sandell 55-yard field goal (Drive: 9 plays, 38 yards, 4:46; OU 26–17)
- (1:56) TENN – Mike Matthews 15-yard pass from Joey Aguilar, Max Gilbert kick (Drive: 6 plays, 55 yards, 2:22; OU 26–24)
- (1:44) OU – John Mateer 1-yard run, Tate Sandell kick (Drive: 2 plays, 44 yards, 0:11; OU 33–24)
- (0:47) TENN – Max Gilbert 48-yard field goal (Drive: 7 plays, 45 yards, 0:57; OU 33–27)

Statistics	OU	TENN
First downs	19	28
Plays–yards	64–351	80–456
Rushes–yards	35–192	35–63
Passing yards	159	393
Passing: Comp–Att–Int	19–29–1	29–45–2
Turnovers	2	3
Time of possession	30:07	29:53

Team	Category	Player	Statistics
Oklahoma	Passing	John Mateer	19/29, 159 yards, INT
Oklahoma	Rushing	Xavier Robinson	16 carries, 115 yards, TD
Oklahoma	Receiving	Isaiah Sategna III	6 receptions, 68 yards
Tennessee	Passing	Joey Aguilar	29/45, 393 yards, 3 TD, 2 INT
Tennessee	Rushing	DeSean Bishop	12 carries, 38 yards
Tennessee	Receiving	Chris Brazzell II	6 receptions, 68 yards

=== vs New Mexico State ===
New Mexico State Aggies (3–6) at No. 23 Tennessee Volunteers (6–3) – Game summary

Quarter	1	2	3	4	Total
Aggies	0	3	0	6	9
No. 23 Volunteers	14	7	21	0	42

at Neyland Stadium • Knoxville, Tennessee

- Date: November 15
- Game time: 4:15 p.m.
- Game weather: Partly Cloudy • Temperature: 66 °F (19 °C)
- Game attendance: 101,915
- Referee: Steve Marlowe
- TV announcers (SECN): Dave Neal (play-by-play), Fozzy Whittaker (analyst), and Morgan Uber (sideline)

Game information

First quarter

- TENN – DeSean Bishop 1-yard run (Max Gilbert kick), 7:54. Volunteers 7–0. Drive: 4 plays, 59 yards, 1:05.
- TENN – Joey Aguilar 27-yard run (Max Gilbert kick), 5:43. Volunteers 14–0. Drive: 3 plays, 36 yards, 0:33.

Second quarter

- TENN – Braylon Staley 15-yard pass from Joey Aguilar (Max Gilbert kick), 11:24. Volunteers 21–0. Drive: 13 plays, 99 yards, 4:46.
- NMSU – David Barker 32-yard field goal, 1:25. Volunteers 21–3. Drive: 11 plays, 51 yards, 3:45.

Third quarter

- TENN – Star Thomas 21-yard run (Max Gilbert kick), 10:46. Volunteers 28–3. Drive: 11 plays, 75 yards, 4:14.
- TENN – Peyton Lewis 1-yard run (Max Gilbert kick), 2:35. Volunteers 35–3. Drive: 11 plays, 60 yards, 4:31.
- TENN – William Wright 35-yard interception return (Max Gilbert kick), 1:24. Volunteers 42–3.

Fourth quarter

- NMSU – Isaiah Rudison 1-yard run (David Barker kick failed), 7:57. Volunteers 42–9. Drive: 6 plays, 43 yards, 2:59.

Statistics	NMSU	TENN
First downs	24	22
Plays–yards	83–340	66–413
Rushes–yards	30–27	39–194
Passing yards	313	219
Passing: Comp–Att–Int	35–53–2	19–27–2
Turnovers	2	2
Time of possession	35:39	24:21

Team	Category	Player	Statistics
New Mexico State	Passing	Logan Fife	23/34, 166 yards, INT
New Mexico State	Rushing	Dijon Stanley	7 carries, 19 yards
New Mexico State	Receiving	Donovan Faupel	9 receptions, 80 yards
Tennessee	Passing	Joey Aguilar	17/23, 204 yards, TD, 2 INT
Tennessee	Rushing	DeSean Bishop	16 carries, 80 yards, TD
Tennessee	Receiving	Chris Brazzell II	3 receptions, 65 yards

=== at Florida (rivalry) ===
No. 20 Tennessee Volunteers (7–3) at Florida Gators (3–7) – Game summary

Quarter	1	2	3	4	Total
No. 20 Volunteers	14	17	0	0	31
Gators	0	0	3	8	11

at Ben Hill Griffin Stadium • Gainesville, Florida

- Date: November 22
- Game time: 7:30 p.m.
- Game weather: Sunny • Temperature: 82 °F (28 °C)
- Game attendance: 90,465
- Referee: Daniel Gautreaux
- TV announcers (ABC): Chris Fowler (play-by-play), Kirk Herbstreit (analyst) and Holly Rowe (sideline)

Game information

First quarter

- TENN – Ethan Davis 23-yard pass from Joey Aguilar (Max Gilbert kick), 11:28. Volunteers 7–0. Drive: 9 plays, 75 yards, 3:32.
- TENN – DeSean Bishop 1-yard run (Max Gilbert kick), 5:33. Volunteers 14–0. Drive: 7 plays, 60 yards, 3:13.

Second quarter

- TENN – DeSean Bishop 1-yard run (Max Gilbert kick), 13:08. Volunteers 21–0. Drive: 12 plays, 67 yards, 6:00.
- TENN – Star Thomas 1-yard run (Max Gilbert kick), 9:14. Volunteers 28–0. Drive: 4 plays, 46 yards, 1:49.
- TENN – Max Gilbert 26-yard field goal, 0:00. Volunteers 31–0. Drive: 8 plays, 72 yards, 1:15.

Third quarter

- FLA – Trey Smack 46-yard field goal, 2:04. Volunteers 31–3. Drive: 13 plays, 71 yards, 8:00.

Fourth quarter

- FLA – Jadan Baugh 33-yard pass from DJ Lagway (DJ Lagway-Tony Livingston pass), 8:15. Volunteers 31–11. Drive: 7 plays, 68 yards, 3:29.

Statistics	TENN	FLA
First downs	28	15
Plays–yards	73–452	47–261
Rushes–yards	51–248	30–145
Passing yards	204	116
Passing: comp–att–int	17-22-0	11-17-0
Turnovers	0	0
Time of possession	35:42	24:18

Team	Category	Player	Statistics
Tennessee	Passing	Joey Aguilar	17/22, 204 yards, TD
Tennessee	Rushing	DeSean Bishop	24 carries, 116 yards, 2 TD
Tennessee	Receiving	Ethan Davis	5 receptions, 72 yards, TD
Florida	Passing	DJ Lagway	11/17, 116 yards, TD
Florida	Rushing	Jadan Baugh	18 carries, 96 yards
Florida	Receiving	Jadan Baugh	2 receptions, 35 yards, TD

=== vs No. 14 Vanderbilt (rivalry) ===
No. 14 Vanderbilt Commodores (9–2) at No. 19 Tennessee Volunteers (8–3) – Game summary

Quarter	1	2	3	4	Total
No. 14 Commodores	7	14	10	14	45
No. 19 Volunteers	7	14	0	3	24

at Neyland Stadium • Knoxville, Tennessee

- Date: November 29
- Game time: 3:30 p.m.
- Game weather: Partly Cloudy • Temperature: 43 °F (6 °C)
- Game attendance: 101,914
- Referee: David Smith
- TV announcers (ESPN): Tom Hart (play-by-play), Jordan Rodgers (analyst) and Cole Cubelic (sideline)

Game information

First quarter

- TENN – DeSean Bishop 2-yard run (Max Gilbert kick), 3:49. Volunteers 7–0. Drive: 12 plays, 80 yards, 4:35.
- VAN – Sedrick Alexander 28-yard run (Brock Taylor kick), 0:59. Tied 7–7. Drive: 6 plays, 75 yards, 2:50.

Second quarter

- VAN – Makhilyn Young 3-yard run (Brock Taylor kick), 11:39. Commodores 14–7. Drive: 4 plays, 78 yards, 2:14.
- TENN – Chris Brazzell II 52-yard pass from Joey Aguilar (Max Gilbert kick), 10:34. Tied 14–14. Drive: 4 plays, 75 yards, 1:05.
- TENN – DeSean Bishop 35-yard run (Max Gilbert kick), 7:51. Volunteers 21–14. Drive: 7 plays, 63 yards, 2:35.
- VAN – Tre Richardson 6-yard pass from Diego Pavia (Brock Taylor kick), 0:12. Tied 21–21. Drive: 7 plays, 52 yards, 3:12.

Third quarter

- VAN – Sedrick Alexander 5-yard run (Brock Taylor kick), 8:25. Commodores 28–21. Drive: 11 plays, 75 yards, 6:35.
- VAN – Brock Taylor 35-yard field goal, 2:12. Commodores 31–21. Drive: 8 plays, 58 yards, 5:11.

Fourth quarter

- TENN – Max Gilbert 25-yard field goal, 12:31. Commodores 31–24. Drive: 15 plays, 68 yards, 4:41.
- VAN – Diego Pavia 24-yard run (Brock Taylor kick), 8:55. Commodores 38–24. Drive: 7 plays, 70 yards, 3:30.
- VAN – Sedrick Alexander 39-yard run (Brock Taylor kick), 5:10. Commodores 45–24. Drive: 3 plays, 50 yards, 1:34.

Statistics	VAN	TENN
First downs	27	21
Plays–yards	65–579	75–382
Rushes–yards	37–314	31–83
Passing yards	265	299
Passing: comp–att–int	18-28-2	29-44-0
Turnovers	2	0
Time of possession	34:59	25:01

Team	Category	Player	Statistics
Vanderbilt	Passing	Diego Pavia	18-28, 268 yards, TD, 2 INT
Vanderbilt	Rushing	Diego Pavia	20 carries, 165 yards, TD
Vanderbilt	Receiving	Junior Sherrill	3 receptions, 76 yards
Tennessee	Passing	Joey Aguilar	29-44, 299 yards, TD
Tennessee	Rushing	DeSean Bishop	20 carries, 97 yards, 2 TD
Tennessee	Receiving	Chris Brazzell II	6 receptions, 91 yards, TD

=== vs. Illinois (Music City Bowl) ===
2025 Liberty Mutual Music City Bowl
Tennessee Volunteers (8-4) vs. Illinois Fighting Illini (8-4) – Game summary

Quarter	1	2	3	4	Total
Volunteers	7	0	7	14	28
Fighting Illini	7	3	14	6	30

at Nissan Stadium • Nashville, TN

- Date: December 30
- Game time: 5:30 p.m. EST
- Game weather: Clear • Temperature: 34 °F (1 °C) • Wind: 7 mph (11 km/h) northwest
- Game attendance: 52,815
- Referee: Riley Johnson (ACC)
- TV announcers (ESPN): Tom Hart (play-by-play), Jordan Rodgers (analyst) and Cole Cubelic (sideline)

Game information

First quarter

- (5:16) TENN – Joey Aguilar 7-yard run (Max Gilbert kick) (11 plays, 67 yards, 4:59; TENN 7–0)
- (0:36) ILL – Justin Bowick 18-yard pass from Luke Altmayer (David Olano kick) (9 plays, 75 yards, 5:40; 7–7)

Second quarter

- (0:21) ILL – David Olano 30-yard field goal (12 plays, 67 yards, 3:07; ILL 10–7)

Third quarter

- (0:21) ILL – Leon Lowery Jr. fumble recovery (David Olano kick) (ILL 17–7)
- (7:31) TENN – DeSean Bishop 1-yard run (Max Gilbert kick) (9 plays, 75 yards, 4:17; ILL 17–14)
- (2:41) TENN – Luke Altmayer 2-yard run (David Olano kick) (8 plays, 68 yards, 4:44; ILL 24–14)

Fourth quarter

- (11:40) TENN – DeSean Bishop 12-yard run (Max Gilbert kick) (14 plays, 79 yards, 5:52; ILL 24–21)
- (5:14) ILL – David Olano 28-yard field goal (12 plays, 65 yards, 6:26; ILL 27–21)
- (4:58) TENN – Joakim Dodson 94-yard kickoff return (Max Gilbert kick) (1 plays, 94 yards, 0:00; TENN 28–27)
- (0:03) ILL – David Olano 29-yard field goal (13 plays, 65 yards, 4:58; ILL 30–28)

Statistics	TENN	ILL
First downs	18	27
Plays–yards	55–278	73–417
Rushes–yards	37–157	39–221
Passing yards	121	196
Passing: Comp–Att–Int	14–18–0	20–34–0
Turnovers	1	0
Time of possession	24:14	35:46

Team	Category	Player	Statistics
Tennessee	Passing	Joey Aguilar	14/18, 121 yards
Tennessee	Rushing	DeSean Bishop	19 carries, 93 yards
Tennessee	Receiving	Mike Matthews	3 receptions, 43 yards
Illinois	Passing	Luke Altmyer	20/33, 196 yards, TD
Illinois	Rushing	Aidan Laughery	13 carries, 77 yards
Illinois	Receiving	Hudson Clement	3 receptions, 48 yards

== Roster ==
2025 Tennessee Volunteers football team roster
Players
Coaches
Offense

Pos.	#	Name	Class
TE	0	Ethan Davis	So
WR	1	Travis Smith Jr.	Fr
RB	2	Peyton Lewis	So
TE	3	Jack Van Dorselaer	Fr
WR	4	Mike Matthews	So
WR	5	Radarious Jackson	Fr
QB	6	Joey Aguilar	GS
TE	7	DaSaahn Brame	Fr
RB	9	Star Thomas	Sr
QB	12	Jake Merklinger	Fr
QB	13	Mason Phillips	Fr
WR	14	Braylon Staley	Fr
QB	15	George MacIntyre	Fr
WR	17	Chris Brazzell II	Jr
RB	18	DeSean Bishop	So
RB	19	Daune Morris	Fr
RB	20	Justin Baker	Fr
RB	24	Hunter Barnes	Jr
WR	26	Carson Whitehead	Jr
WR	29	Jack-Henry Jakobik	So
WR	35	Ben Petermann	Fr
WR	36	Nathan Roberts	So
WR	39	Malcolm Kinzer	Fr
TE	40	Seamus Meagher	Sr
WR	42	Braylon Harmon	Fr
OL	50	William Satterwhite	Fr
OL	51	Jeremias Heard	Fr
OL	53	Lance Heard	Jr
OL	55	Antoni Ogumoro	Fr
OL	56	Sam Pendleton	So
OL	58	Nic Moore	Fr
OL	59	Charlie Powell III	Fr
OL	65	Michael Kostantonov	Fr
OL	68	Bennett Warren	Fr
OL	69	Gus Hill	Jr
OL	70	David Sanders Jr.	Fr
OL	71	Max Anderson	Fr
OL	72	Jesse Perry	Fr
OL	73	Brian Grant	Jr
OL	74	Shamurad Umarov	So
OL	75	Wendell Moe Jr.	Jr
OL	78	Gage Ginther	Fr
WR	81	Amari Jefferson	Fr
WR	83	Trey Weary	Jr
WR	84	Tommy Winton III	Jr
TE	86	Cole Harrison	Fr
TE	87	Miles Kitselman	Sr
WR	88	Deon Hardin	Jr
WR	89	Joakim Dodson	Fr

Defense

Pos.	#	Name	Class
DB	0	William Wright	Sr
DB	1	Rickey Gibson III	Jr
DB	2	Andre Turrentine	Sr
DB	3	Jermod McCoy	Jr
DB	4	Jourdan Thomas	Jr
DB	6	Jalen McMurray	Sr
LB	7	Arion Carter	Jr
DB	8	Colton Hood	So
DL	9	Mariyon Dye	Fr
DB	10	Kaleb Beasley	So
LB	11	Jordan Burns	Fr
LB	12	Jaedon Harmon	Fr
LB	13	Edwin Spillman	Fr
DB	15	Edrees Farooq	So
DL	18	Tyree Weathersby	So
DL	19	Joshua Josephs	Sr
DL	20	Bryson Eason	Sr
LB	22	Jeremiah Telander	Jr
DB	23	Boo Carter	So
DB	24	Dylan Lewis	Fr
DB	25	Timothy Merritt	Fr
DB	26	Sidney Walton	Fr
DB	27	Ty Redmond	Fr
DB	28	Marcus Goree Jr.	Fr
DL	29	Jordan Ross	So
DL	30	Jamal Wallace	Jr
DL	31	Caleb Herring	Jr
LB	33	Ben Bolton	Jr
DL	34	Emmanuel Okoye	So
DL	35	Carson Gentle	Fr
DB	36	Tre Poteat	Fr
DB	37	Montrell Bandy	Sr
DB	38	Andre Stewart	Jr
DL	39	Jayden Loftin	Fr
DB	40	Colin Brazzell	Fr
LB	41	Jadon Perlotte	Fr
DL	42	Tyre West	Sr
DB	43	Jackson Mathews	Fr
DB	44	Steele Katina	Fr
DL	46	Christian Gass	Fr
DL	47	Isaiah Campbell	Fr
LB	50	Ryan Scott	Fr
DL	51	Jaxson Moi	Sr
DL	53	Daevin Hobbs	Jr
LB	55	Brenden Anes	Fr
DL	56	Kellen Lindstrom	Fr
LB	57	Grier Short	Fr
DL	58	Herb Gray	Fr
DL	59	Tim Amet	Sr
DL	87	Joshua Helsdon	Jr
DL	89	Mike Bethea	Jr
DL	90	Dominic Bailey	Sr
DL	94	Nathan Robinson	So
DL	96	Isaiah Inge	Fr
DL	97	Ethan Utley	Fr
DL	99	Charles House III	Fr

Special teams

Pos.	#	Name	Class
LS	48	Bennett Brady	Jr
PK	90	Max Gilbert	So
PK	93	Grady Dangerfield	Fr
P/PK	94	Josh Turbyville	Jr
P	98	Jackson Ross	Jr

Head coach

- Josh Heupel

Coordinators/assistant coaches

- Alec Abeln – Tight ends
- Tim Banks – Defensive coordinator
- Evan Crabtree – Special teams coordinator
- Glen Elarbee – Offensive line
- Rodney Garner – Defensive line
- Joey Halzle – Offensive coordinator/Quarterbacks
- Levorn Harbin – Outside linebackers
- William Inge – Linebackers
- Willie Martinez – Secondary
- Kelsey Pope – Wide receivers
- De'Rail Sims – Running backs
- Max Thurmond – Senior offensive analyst

Legend

- (C) Team captain
- (S) Suspended
- (I) Ineligible
- Injured
- Redshirt

Roster
