= 2025 East Tennessee State Buccaneers football team =

American college football season

2025 East Tennessee State Buccaneers football
- Conference: Southern Conference
- Record: 7–5 (5–3 SoCon)
- Head coach: Will Healy (1st season)
- Offensive coordinator: Cam Aiken (1st season)
- Offensive scheme: Veer and shoot
- Defensive coordinator: Chad Staggs (1st season)
- Base defense: 4–2–5
- Home stadium: William B. Greene Jr. Stadium

2025 Southern Conference football standings
	Conf.			Overall
Team	W		L	W		L
No. 17 Mercer $^	8	–	0	9	–	3
Western Carolina	6	–	2	7	–	5
East Tennessee State	5	–	3	7	–	5
Wofford	5	–	3	6	–	6
Chattanooga	4	–	4	5	–	7
Furman	4	–	4	6	–	6
The Citadel	3	–	5	4	–	8
Samford	1	–	7	1	–	11
VMI	0	–	8	1	–	11
$ – Conference champion; ^ – FCS playoff participant; Rankings from STATS Poll

The 2025 East Tennessee State Buccaneers football team represented East Tennessee State University as a member of the Southern Conference (SoCon) during the 2025 NCAA Division I FCS football season. The Buccaneers were led by first-year head coach Will Healy and played at the William B. Greene Jr. Stadium in Johnson City, Tennessee.

== Schedule ==
Date	Time	Opponent	Site	TV	Result	Attendance
August 30	5:30 p.m.	Murray State*	William B. Greene Jr. Stadium; Johnson City, TN	ESPN+	W 45–17	9,122
September 6	3:30 p.m.	at No. 22 (FBS) Tennessee*	Neyland Stadium; Knoxville, TN	SECN+/ESPN+	L 17–72	101,915
September 13	6:00 p.m.	at No. 25 West Georgia*	University Stadium; Carrollton, GA	ESPN+	L 31–35	4,786
September 20	5:30 p.m.	Elon*	William B. Greene Jr. Stadium; Johnson City, TN	ESPN+	W 26–16	8,030
September 27	5:30 p.m.	Mercer	William B. Greene Jr. Stadium; Johnson City, TN	ESPN+	L 34–38	10,567
October 4	2:00 p.m.	at Furman	Paladin Stadium; Greenville, SC	ESPN+	L 22–31	10,527
October 11	3:30 p.m.	VMI	William B. Greene Jr. Stadium; Johnson City, TN	ESPN+	W 45–10	7,953
October 18	1:30 p.m.	at Chattanooga	Finley Stadium; Chattanooga, TN	ESPN+	L 38–42	9,307
October 25	3:30 p.m.	Wofford	William B. Greene Jr. Stadium; Johnson City, TN	ESPN+	W 14–10	9,836
November 8	3:30 p.m.	at Samford	Pete Hanna Stadium; Homewood, AL	ESPN+	W 38–14	3,591
November 15	12:00 p.m.	at No. 25 Western Carolina	Bob Waters Field at E. J. Whitmire Stadium; Cullowhee, NC	ESPN+	W 52–35	10,543
November 22	1:00 p.m.	The Citadel	William B. Greene Jr. Stadium; Johnson City, TN	ESPN+	W 28–26	9,049
*Non-conference game; Rankings from STATS Poll released prior to the game; All times are in Eastern time

== Game summaries ==
=== Murray State ===
Murray State Racers (0-0) at East Tennessee State Buccaneers (0-0) – Game summary

Quarter	1	2	3	4	Total
Racers	0	3	14	0	17
Buccaneers	14	10	14	7	45

at William B. Greene Jr. Stadium • Johnson City, TN

- Date: August 30
- Game time: 5:30 PM EDT
- Game weather: Sunny • Temperature: 79 °F (26 °C) • Wind: NW at 8 miles per hour (13 km/h)
- Game attendance: 9,122
- Referee: Bruce Austin
- TV announcers (ESPN+): Keith Brake (play-by-play) and Mark Hutsell (analyst)
- Box Score

Game information

First Quarter

- (5:03) ETSU – Khalil Eichelberger 2 yard run, Ewan Johnson kick (Drive: 6 plays, 60 yards, 1:51; Buccaneers 7–0)
- (1:03) ETSU – Devontae Houston 1 yard run, Ewan Johnson kick (Drive: 5 plays, 67 yards, 2:06; Buccaneers 14–0)

Second Quarter

- (12:52) MUR – Jack Tannehill 22 yard field goal (Drive: 8 plays, 61 yards, 3:11; Buccaneers 14–3)
- (10:31) ETSU – Jeremiah Harrison 26 yard pass from Cade McNamara, Ewan Johnson kick (Drive: 6 plays, 75 yards, 2:21; Buccaneers 21–3)
- (0:21) ETSU – Ewan Johnson 33 yard field goal (Drive: 16 plays, 54 yards, 5:56; Buccaneers 24–3)

Third Quarter

- (12:36) MUR – Jawaun Northington 1 yard run, Jack Tannehill kick (Drive: 6 plays, 65 yards, 2:24; Buccaneers 24–10)
- (8:51) MUR – Brooks Kleinpeter 15 yard pass from Jim Ogle, Jack Tannehill kick (Drive: 4 plays, 35 yards, 2:09; Buccaneers 24–17)
- (7:53) ETSU – Devontae Houston 7 yard run, Ewan Johnson kick (Drive: 3 plays, 75 yards, 0:58; Buccaneers 31–17)
- (1:20) ETSU – Khalil Eichelberger 1 yard run, Ewan Johnson kick (Drive: 13 plays, 64 yards, 5:02; Buccaneers 38–17)

Fourth Quarter

- (11:57) ETSU – D'Marius Rucker 2 yard run, Ewan Johnson kick (Drive: 8 plays, 41 yards, 2:15; Buccaneers 45–17)

Statistics	MUR	ETSU
First downs	18	31
Total yards	260	572
Rushing yards	34	392
Passing yards	226	180
Passing: Comp–Att–Int	22–35–2	17–25–1
Time of possession	28:51	31:09

Team	Category	Player	Statistics
Murray State	Passing	Jim Ogle	22/35, 226 yards, 1 TD, 2 INT
Murray State	Rushing	Jawaun Northington	12 carries, 33 yards, 1 TD
Murray State	Receiving	Darius Cannon	11 receptions, 86 yards
East Tennessee State	Passing	Cade McNamara	12/17, 146 yards, 1 TD, 1 INT
East Tennessee State	Rushing	Devontae Houston	14 carries, 128 yards, 2 TD
East Tennessee State	Receiving	Jeremiah Harrison	3 receptions, 56 yards, 1 TD

=== at No. 22 (FBS) Tennessee ===
East Tennessee State Buccaneers (1–0) at No. 22 (FBS) Tennessee Volunteers (1–0) – Game summary

Quarter	1	2	3	4	Total
Buccaneers	0	7	3	7	17
No. 22 (FBS) Volunteers	24	24	14	10	72

at Neyland Stadium • Knoxville, Tennessee

- Date: September 6
- Game time: 3:30 p.m.
- Game weather:
- Game attendance: 101,915
- Referee: Ken Williamson
- TV announcers (SECN+/ESPN+): Matt Schumacker, Dustin Fox, and Stephanie Otey

Game information

First quarter

- TENN – Chris Brazzell II 21-yard pass from Joey Aguilar (Max Gilbert kick), 13:08. Volunteers 7–0. Drive: 6 plays, 82 yards, 1:46.
- TENN – Max Gilbert 29-yard field goal, 9:28. Volunteers 10–0. Drive: 7 plays, 38 yards, 2:13.
- TENN – Star Thomas 2-yard run (Max Gilbert kick), 7:07. Volunteers 17–0. Drive: 4 plays, 27 yards, 1:17.
- TENN – Peyton Lewis 1-yard run (Max Gilbert kick), 0:46. Volunteers 24–0. Drive: 3 plays, 5 yards, 1:09.

Second quarter

- TENN – Star Thomas 2-yard run (Max Gilbert kick), 11:41. Volunteers 31–0. Drive: 9 plays, 58 yards, 3:09.
- TENN – Max Gilbert 37-yard field goal, 8:03. Volunteers 34–0. Drive: 6 plays, 26 yards, 1:57.
- TENN – Mike Matthews 53-yard pass from Joey Aguilar (Max Gilbert kick), 4:08. Volunteers 41–0. Drive: 6 plays, 80 yards, 1:30.
- ETSU – Taharin Sudderth 5-yard pass from Cade McNamara (Ewan Johnson kick), 1:55. Volunteers 41–7. Drive: 1 play, 5 yards, 0:06.
- TENN – Star Thomas 7-yard run (Max Gilbert kick), 0:22. Volunteers 48–7. Drive: 8 plays, 75 yards, 1:33.

Third quarter

- ETSU – Ewan Johnson 41-yard field goal, 11:52. Volunteers 48–10. Drive: 8 plays, 51 yards, 3:08.
- TENN – Chris Brazell II 1-yard pass from Jake Merklinger (Josh Turbyville kick), 8:45. Volunteers 55–10. Drive: 10 plays, 75 yards, 3:07.
- TENN – Jack Van Dorselaer 7-yard pass from Jake Merklinger (Josh Turbyville kick), 2:45. Volunteers 62–10. Drive: 9 plays, 67 yards, 3:22.

Fourth quarter

- TENN – Max Gilbert 53-yard field goal, 10:43. Volunteers 65–10. Drive: 12 plays, 41 yards, 4:57.
- ETSU – Jason Albritton 20-yard run (Ewan Johnson kick), 8:46. Volunteers 65–17. Drive: 6 plays, 75 yards, 1:57.
- TENN – Daune Morris 10-yard run (Josh Turbyville kick), 3:55. Volunteers 72–17. Drive: 11 plays, 75 yards, 4:51.

Statistics	ETSU	TENN
First downs	10	41
Plays–yards	59–216	99–734
Rushes–yards	28–49	47–276
Passing yards	167	458
Passing: comp–att–int	19–31–0	38–52–0
Turnovers	0	0
Time of possession	24:58	35:02

Team	Category	Player	Statistics
East Tennessee State	Passing	Cade McNamara	11/18, 85 yards, TD
East Tennessee State	Rushing	Jason Albritton	4 carries, 30 yards, TD
East Tennessee State	Receiving	Cole Keller	3 receptions, 47 yards
Tennessee	Passing	Joey Aguilar	23/31, 288 yards, 2 TD
Tennessee	Rushing	Star Thomas	12 carries, 69 yards, 3 TD
Tennessee	Receiving	Chris Brazzell II	9 receptions, 125 yards, 2 TD

=== at No. 25 West Georgia ===
East Tennessee State Buccaneers (1-1) at No. 25 West Georgia Wolves (2-0) – Game summary

Quarter	1	2	3	4	Total
Buccaneers	14	7	10	0	31
No. 25 Wolves	3	10	7	15	35

at University Stadium • Carrollton, GA

- Date: September 13
- Game time: 6:00 PM EDT
- Game weather: Sunny • Temperature: 79 °F (26 °C) • Wind: E at 3 miles per hour (4.8 km/h)
- Game attendance: 4,786
- Referee: Michael Lennie
- TV announcers (ESPN+): Patrick Eidson (play-by-play) and Parker Gore (analyst)
- Box Score

Game information

First Quarter

- (7:28) UWG – Tommy Holden 30 yard field goal (Drive: 8 plays, 21 yards, 3:16; Wolves 3–0)
- (1:43) ETSU – Jason Albritton 8 yard run, Ewan Johnson kick (Drive: 16 plays, 75 yards, 5:45; Buccaneers 7–3)
- (0:22) ETSU – Cole Keller 16 yard pass from Jacolby Criswell, Ewan Johnson kick (Drive: 3 plays, 13 yards, 0:58; Buccaneers 14–3)

Second Quarter

- (13:28) UWG – Latrelle Murrell 62 yard pass from Davin Wydner, Tommy Holden kick (Drive: 5 plays, 75 yards, 1:54; Buccaneers 14–10)
- (0:22) ETSU – Karim Page 31 yard pass from Jacolby Criswell, Ewan Johnson kick (Drive: 6 plays, 75 yards, 2:18; Buccaneers 21–10)
- (4:39) UWG – Tommy Holden 49 yard field goal (Drive: 12 plays, 51 yards, 6:18; Buccaneers 21–13)

Third Quarter

- (9:26) ETSU – Devontae Houston 11 yard pass from Jacolby Criswell, Ewan Johnson kick (Drive: 2 plays, 21 yards, 0:30; Buccaneers 28–13)
- (6:31) UWG – TJ Lester 8 yard run, Tommy Holden kick (Drive: 5 plays, 75 yards, 2:49; Buccaneers 28–20)
- (4:07) ETSU – Ewan Johnson 46 yard field goal (Drive: 7 plays, 46 yards, 2:24; Buccaneers 31–20)

Fourth Quarter

- (6:40) UWG – Latrelle Murrell 27 yard pass from Davin Wydner (DeAndre Buchanon pass) (Drive: 10 plays, 88 yards, 4:06; Buccaneers 31–28)
- (0:15) UWG – Devion Newson 2 yard pass from Davin Wydner, Tommy Holden kick (Drive: 5 plays, 71 yards, 0:27; Wolves 35–31)

Statistics	ETSU	UWG
First downs	18	27
Total yards	289	457
Rushing yards	105	194
Passing yards	184	263
Passing: Comp–Att–Int	14–22–2	18–35–3
Time of possession	23:14	36:46

Team	Category	Player	Statistics
East Tennessee State	Passing	Jacolby Criswell	5/8, 108 yards, 3 TD
East Tennessee State	Rushing	Devontae Houston	14 carries, 59 yards
East Tennessee State	Receiving	Ephraim Floyd	5 receptions, 76 yards
West Georgia	Passing	Davin Wydner	18/34, 263 yards, 3 TD, 3 INT
West Georgia	Rushing	Latrelle Murrell	20 carries, 116 yards
West Georgia	Receiving	Latrelle Murrell	3 receptions, 92 yards, 2 TD

=== Elon ===
Elon Phoenix (2-1) vs. East Tennessee State Buccaneers (1-2) – Game summary

Quarter	1	2	3	4	Total
Phoenix	3	7	0	6	16
Buccaneers	3	14	3	6	26

at William B. Greene Jr. Stadium • Johnson City, TN

- Date: September 20
- Game time: 5:30 p.m. EDT
- Game weather: Cloudy • Temperature: 80 °F (27 °C) • Wind: NW at 8 miles per hour (13 km/h)
- Game attendance: 8,030
- Referee: Michael Farmer
- TV announcers (ESPN+): Keith Brake (play-by-play), Mark Hutsell (analyst) and Kennedy Story (sideline)
- Box Score

Game information

First Quarter

- (10:15) ELON – Luke Barnes 42-yard field goal (Drive: 4 plays, 4 yards, 1:33; Elon 3–0)
- (0:15) ETSU – Ewan Johnson 35-yard field goal (Drive: 4 plays, 5 yards, 1:22; Tied 3–3)

Second Quarter

- (10:11) ETSU – Cade McNamara 9-yard run, Ewan Johnson kick (Drive: 9 plays, 77 yards, 2:50; East Tennessee State 10–3)
- (0:46) ELON – Dylan Magazu 8-yard pass from Landen Clark, Luke Barnes kick (Drive: 10 plays, 82 yards, 2:39; Tied 10–10)
- (0:08) ETSU – Jason Albritton 1-yard run, Ewan Johnson kick (Drive: 5 plays, 65 yards, 0:38; East Tennessee State 17–10)

Third Quarter

- (10:07) ETSU – Ewan Johnson 49-yard field goal (Drive: 5 plays, 15 yards, 2:41; East Tennessee State 20–10)

Fourth Quarter

- (7:37) ETSU – Khalil Eichelberger 5-yard run (Drive: 12 plays, 87 yards, 5:34; East Tennessee State 26–10)
- (6:06) ELON – Isaiah Fuhrmann 11-yard pass from Landen Clark (Drive: 3 plays, 70 yards, 1:22; East Tennessee State 26–16)

Statistics	ELON	ETSU
First downs	15	24
Total yards	293	406
Rushing yards	70	138
Passing yards	223	268
Passing: Comp–Att–Int	15–29–1	30–45–1
Time of possession	25:26	34:34

Team	Category	Player	Statistics
Elon	Passing	Landen Clark	15/29, 223 yards, 2 TD, INT
Elon	Rushing	Landen Clark	14 carries, 47 yards
Elon	Receiving	Landyn Backey	4 receptions, 91 yards
East Tennessee State	Passing	Cade McNamara	30/45, 268 yards, INT
East Tennessee State	Rushing	Jason Albritton	11 carries, 56 yards, TD
East Tennessee State	Receiving	Ephraim Floyd	12 receptions, 145 yards

=== Mercer ===
Mercer Bears (2-1) vs. East Tennessee State Buccaneers (2-2) – Game summary

Quarter	1	2	3	4	Total
Bears	3	14	7	14	38
Buccaneers	10	17	7	0	34

at William B. Greene Jr. Stadium • Johnson City, TN

- Date: September 27
- Game time: 5:30 p.m. EDT
- Game weather: Cloudy • Temperature: 72 °F (22 °C) • Wind: E at 6 miles per hour (9.7 km/h)
- Game attendance: 10,567
- Referee: Jason Graham
- TV announcers (ESPN+): Keith Brake (play-by-play), Mark Hutsell (analyst) and Kennedy Story (sideline)
- Box Score

Game information

First Quarter

- (10:09) MER – Reice Griffith 49-yard field goal (Drive: 5 plays, 18 yards, 0:56; Mercer 3–0)
- (8:59) ETSU – Hakeem Meggett 14-yard pass from Cade McNamara, Ewan Johnson kick (Drive: 3 plays, 71 yards, 1:03; East Tennessee State 7–3)
- (1:41) ETSU – Ewan Johnson 21-yard field goal (Drive: 15 plays, 71 yards, 5:44; East Tennessee State 10–3)

Second Quarter

- (11:10) MER – Adonis McDaniel 3-yard pass from Braden Atkinson, Reice Griffith kick (Drive: 11 plays, 75 yards, 5:31; Tied 10–10)
- (7:52) ETSU – Charlie Browder 20-yard pass from Cade McNamara, Ewan Johnson kick (Drive: 8 plays, 86 yards, 3:12; East Tennessee State 17–10)
- (5:54) MER – Adjatay Dabbs 29-yard pass from Braden Atkinson, Reice Griffith kick (Drive: 4 plays, 75 yards, 1:58; Tied 17–17)
- (1:28) ETSU – Hakeem Meggett 35-yard pass from Cade McNamara, Ewan Johnson kick (Drive: 11 plays, 75 yards, 4:26; East Tennessee State 24–17)
- (0:00) ETSU – Ewan Johnson 32-yard field goal (Drive: 6 plays, 16 yards, 0:26; East Tennessee State 27–17)

Third Quarter

- (7:42) MER – CJ Miller 1-yard run, Reice Griffith kick (Drive: 9 plays, 61 yards, 5:11; East Tennessee State 27–24)
- (5:29) ETSU – Hakeem Meggett 22-yard pass from Cade McNamara, Ewan Johnson kick (Drive: 6 plays, 75 yards, 2:13; East Tennessee State 34–24)

Fourth Quarter

- (11:29) MER – Brayden Smith 17-yard pass from Braden Atkinson, Reice Griffith kick (Drive: 10 plays, 46 yards, 4:54; East Tennessee State 34–31)
- (5:40) MER – CJ Miller 1-yard run, Reice Griffith kick (Drive: 8 plays, 65 yards, 4:22; Mercer 38–34)

Statistics	MER	ETSU
First downs	22	33
Total yards	421	467
Rushing yards	234	69
Passing yards	187	398
Passing: Comp–Att–Int	18–26–1	29–47–2
Time of possession	33:15	26:45

Team	Category	Player	Statistics
Mercer	Passing	Braden Atkinson	18/26, 187 yards, 3 TD, INT
Mercer	Rushing	CJ Miller	29 carries, 172 yards, 2 TD
Mercer	Receiving	Adjatay Dabbs	3 receptions, 76 yards, TD
East Tennessee State	Passing	Cade McNamara	29/46, 398 yards, 4 TD, 2 INT
East Tennessee State	Rushing	Jason Albritton	14 carries, 39 yards
East Tennessee State	Receiving	Hakeem Meggett	5 receptions, 119 yards, 3 TD

=== at Furman ===
East Tennessee State Buccaneers (2-3) vs. Furman Paladins (3-1) – Game summary

Quarter	1	2	3	4	Total
Buccaneers	8	7	7	0	22
Paladins	7	0	10	14	31

at Paladin Stadium • Greenville, SC

- Date: October 4
- Game time: 2:00 p.m. EDT
- Game weather: Sunny • Temperature: 74 °F (23 °C) • Wind: NE at 7 miles per hour (11 km/h)
- Game attendance: 10,527
- Referee: Brian Hilpisch
- TV announcers (ESPN+): Dan Scott (play-by-play), David Cobb (analyst) and Tom Van Hoy (sideline)
- Box Score

Game information

First Quarter

- (9:30) ETSU – Cole Keller 0-yard punt return, Nate Brackett rush (East Tennessee State 8–0)
- (3:53) FUR – Trey Hedden 1-yard run, Ian Williams kick (Drive: 12 plays, 83 yards, 5:31; East Tennessee State 8–7)

Second Quarter

- (9:42) ETSU – Devontae Houston 1-yard run, Ewan Johnson kick (Drive: 12 plays, 79 yards, 4:35; East Tennessee State 15–7)

Third Quarter

- (14:49) ETSU – Devontae Houston 75-yard run, Ewan Johnson kick (Drive: 1 play, 75 yards, 0:11; East Tennessee State 22–7)
- (11:11) FUR – Ja'Keith Hamilton 10-yard pass from Trey Hedden, Ian Williams kick (Drive: 8 plays, 75 yards, 3:38; East Tennessee State 22–14)
- (6:51) FUR – Ian Williams 44-yard field goal (Drive: 8 plays, 47 yards, 2:47; East Tennessee State 22–17)

Fourth Quarter

- (3:57) FUR – Ja'Keith Hamilton 53-yard pass from Trey Hedden, Luke Clyburn pass (Drive: 5 plays, 76 yards, 2:00; Furman 25–22)
- (0:00) FUR – Jordan Miller 95-yard interception (Furman 31–22)

Statistics	ETSU	FUR
First downs	20	31
Total yards	362	500
Rushing yards	251	142
Passing yards	111	358
Passing: Comp–Att–Int	9–22–1	36–49–1
Time of possession	24:28	35:32

Team	Category	Player	Statistics
East Tennessee State	Passing	Jacolby Criswell	7/14, 100 yards, INT
East Tennessee State	Rushing	Devontae Houston	22 carries, 150 yards, 2 TD
East Tennessee State	Receiving	Hakeem Meggett	1 reception, 42 yards
Furman	Passing	Trey Hedden	36/49, 358 yards, 2 TD, INT
Furman	Rushing	Gavin Hall	23 carries, 101 yards
Furman	Receiving	Ja'Keith Hamilton	11 receptions, 141 yards, 2 TD

=== VMI ===
VMI Keydets (1-4) vs. East Tennessee State Buccaneers (2-4) – Game summary

Quarter	1	2	3	4	Total
Keydets	0	0	7	3	10
Buccaneers	7	17	14	7	45

at William B. Greene Jr. Stadium • Johnson City, TN

- Date: October 11
- Game time: 3:30 p.m. EDT
- Game weather: Sunny • Temperature: 71 °F (22 °C) • Wind: NE at 6 miles per hour (9.7 km/h)
- Game attendance: 7,953
- Referee: Bruce Austin
- TV announcers (ESPN+): Keith Brake (play-by-play), Mark Hutsell (analyst) and Kennedy Story (sideline)
- Box Score

Game information

First Quarter

- (13:23) ETSU – Xavier Gaillardetz 80-yard punt return, Ewan Johnson kick (East Tennessee State 7–0)

Second Quarter

- (14:54) ETSU – Devontae Houston 10-yard run, Ewan Johnson kick (Drive: 3 plays, 22 yards, 0:54; East Tennessee State 14–0)
- (4:16) ETSU – Ewan Johnson 33-yard field goal (Drive: 4 plays, 2 yards, 1:29; East Tennessee State 17–0)
- (1:20) ETSU – Jeremiah Harrison 17-yard pass from Jake McNamara, Ewan Johnson kick (Drive: 3 plays, 40 yards, 0:49; East Tennessee State 24–0)

Third Quarter

- (13:16) ETSU – Ephraim Floyd 12-yard pass from Jake McNamara, Ewan Johnson kick (Drive: 5 plays, 75 yards, 1:44; East Tennessee State 31–0)
- (11:20) VMI – Robert Powell 10-yard interception, Ben Shrewsbury kick (East Tennessee State 31–7)
- (9:23) ETSU – Jason Albritton 1-yard run, Ewan Johnson kick (Drive: 6 plays, 75 yards, 1:57; East Tennessee State 38–7)

Fourth Quarter

- (5:35) VMI – Ben Shrewsbury 52-yard field goal (Drive: 5 plays, 12 yards, 2:00; East Tennessee State 38–10)
- (0:58) ETSU – Jackson Byrd 20-yard run, Ewan Johnson kick (Drive: 8 plays, 79 yards, 4:21; East Tennessee State 45–10)

Statistics	VMI	ETSU
First downs	5	24
Total yards	82	509
Rushing yards	13	284
Passing yards	69	225
Passing: Comp–Att–Int	11–30–1	16–26–1
Time of possession	28:47	31:13

Team	Category	Player	Statistics
VMI	Passing	Collin Shannon	7/16, 41 yards, INT
VMI	Rushing	Luke Schalow	10 carries, 32 yards
VMI	Receiving	Traveion Slaughter	2 receptions, 22 yards
East Tennessee State	Passing	Jake McNamara	8/14, 176 yards, 2 TD, INT
East Tennessee State	Rushing	Devontae Houston	12 carries, 76 yards, TD
East Tennessee State	Receiving	Jeremiah Harrison	5 receptions, 71 yards, TD

=== at Chattanooga ===
East Tennessee State Buccaneers (3-4) vs. Chattanooga Mocs (2-4) – Game summary

Quarter	1	2	3	4	Total
Buccaneers	10	0	7	21	38
Mocs	7	7	7	21	42

at Finley Stadium • Chattanooga, TN

- Date: October 18
- Game time: 1:30 p.m. EDT
- Game weather: Cloudy • Temperature: 80 °F (27 °C) • Wind: S at 6 miles per hour (9.7 km/h)
- Game attendance: 9,307
- Referee: Jake Grombach
- TV announcers (ESPN+): Chris Goforth (play-by-play), Scott McMahon (analyst) and Mackenzie Johnson (sideline)
- Box Score

Game information

First Quarter

- (8:53) ETSU – Ewan Johnson 20-yard field goal (Drive: 14 plays, 72 yards, 6:07; East Tennessee State 3–0)
- (5:49) UTC – Ryan Ingram 23-yard run, Jude Kelley kick (Drive: 6 plays, 75 yards, 3:04; Chattanooga 7–3)
- (1:56) ETSU – Cade McNamara 25-yard run, Ewan Johnson kick (Drive: 12 plays, 70 yards, 3:51; East Tennessee State 10–7)

Second Quarter

- (13:45) UTC – Markell Quick 21-yard pass from Camden Orth, Jude Kelley kick (Drive: 8 plays, 75 yards, 3:11; Chattanooga 14–10)

Third Quarter

- (9:04) UTC – Jude Kelley 8-yard run, Jude Kelley kick (Drive: 10 plays, 78 yards, 5:51; Chattanooga 21–10)
- (6:38) ETSU – Jason Albritton 60-yard run, Ewan Johnson kick (Drive: 5 plays, 83 yards, 2:16; Chattanooga 21–17)

Fourth Quarter

- (14:00) ETSU – Jason Albritton 1-yard run, Ewan Johnson kick (Drive: 8 plays, 62 yards, 2:35; East Tennessee State 24–21)
- (12:04) ETSU – Jeremiah Harrison 23-yard pass from Cade McNamara, Ewan Johnson kick (Drive: 3 plays, 75 yards, 1:03; East Tennessee State 31–21)
- (10:17) ETSU – Devontae Houston 49-yard run, Ewan Johnson kick (Drive: 2 plays, 54 yards, 0:30; East Tennessee State 38–21)
- (7:20) UTC – Josh Williams 22-yard pass from Camden Orth, Jude Kelley kick (Drive: 6 plays, 85 yards, 2:51; East Tennessee State 38–28)
- (2:29) UTC – Jamarii Robinson 20-yard pass from Camden Orth, Jude Kelley kick (Drive: 6 plays, 80 yards, 2:21; East Tennessee State 38–35)
- (0:11) UTC – Jamarii Robinson 4-yard pass from Camden Orth, Jude Kelley kick (Drive: 11 plays, 67 yards, 1:44; Chattanooga 42–38)

Statistics	ETSU	UTC
First downs	25	26
Total yards	517	519
Rushing yards	321	176
Passing yards	196	343
Passing: Comp–Att–Int	19–6–0	20–34–0
Time of possession	29:00	31:00

Team	Category	Player	Statistics
East Tennessee State	Passing	Cade McNamara	19/26, 196 yards, TD
East Tennessee State	Rushing	Devontae Houston	23 carries, 171 yards, TD
East Tennessee State	Receiving	Jeremiah Harrison	4 receptions, 76 yards, TD
Chattanooga	Passing	Camden Orth	220/32, 343 yards, 4 TDs
Chattanooga	Rushing	Justus Durant	21 carries, 95 yards
Chattanooga	Receiving	Markell Quick	6 receptions, 15 yards, TD

=== Wofford ===
Wofford Terriers (2-5) vs. East Tennessee State Buccaneers (3-5) – Game summary

Quarter	1	2	3	4	Total
Terriers	7	3	0	0	10
Buccaneers	14	0	0	0	14

at William B. Greene Jr. Stadium • Johnson City, TN

- Date: October 25
- Game time: 3:30 p.m. EDT
- Game weather: Cloudy • Temperature: 64 °F (18 °C) • Wind: E at 4 miles per hour (6.4 km/h)
- Game attendance: 9,836
- Referee: Jason Graham
- TV announcers (ESPN+): Keith Brake (play-by-play), Mark Hutsell (analyst) and Kennedy Story (sideline)
- Box Score

Game information

First Quarter

- (10:54) ETSU – Devontae Houston 28-yard run, Ewan Johnson kick (Drive: 6 plays, 80 yards, 2:31; East Tennessee State 7–0)
- (7:59) WOF – Colby Alexander 17-yard run, Sam Spence kick (Drive: 7 plays, 72 yards, 2:55; Tied 7–7)
- (3:32) ETSU – Devontae Houston 6-yard run, Ewan Johnson kick (Drive: 11 plays, 75 yards, 4:27; East Tennessee State 14–7)

Second Quarter

- (8:34) WOF – Sam Spence 34-yard field goal (Drive: 8 plays, 71 yards, 4:53; East Tennessee State 14–10)

Third Quarter

No scoring plays

Fourth Quarter

No scoring plays

Statistics	WOF	ETSU
First downs	16	20
Total yards	307	323
Rushing yards	162	123
Passing yards	145	200
Passing: Comp–Att–Int	22–29–0	26–31–0
Time of possession	29:01	30:59

Team	Category	Player	Statistics
Wofford	Passing	JT Fayard	22/29, 145 yards
Wofford	Rushing	Gerald Modest Jr.	12 carries, 80 yards
Wofford	Receiving	Isaiah Scott	4 receptions, 46 yards
East Tennessee State	Passing	Cade McNamara	12/13, 103 yards
East Tennessee State	Rushing	Devontae Houston	18 carries, 94 yards, 2 TDs
East Tennessee State	Receiving	Jeremiah Harrison	7 receptions, 79 yards

=== at Samford ===
East Tennessee State Buccaneers (4-5) vs. Samford Bulldogs (1-8) – Game summary

Quarter	1	2	3	4	Total
Buccaneers	21	3	14	0	38
Bulldogs	7	0	0	7	14

at Pete Hanna Stadium • Homewood, AL

- Date: November 8
- Game time: 3:30 p.m. EST
- Game weather: Sunny • Temperature: 73 °F (23 °C) • Wind: NE at 3 miles per hour (4.8 km/h)
- Game attendance: 3,591
- Referee: Michael Farmer
- TV announcers (ESPN+): Blake Gardner (play-by-play), Damian Mitchell (analyst) and Christina Chambers (sideline)
- Box Score

Game information

First Quarter

- (13:40) ETSU – Devontae Houston 45-yard run, Ewan Johnson kick (Drive: 4 plays, 71 yards, 1:16; East Tennessee State 7–0)
- (12:45) ETSU – Xavier Gaillardetz 70-yard pass from Ephraim Floyd, Ewan Johnson kick (Drive: 1 play, 70 yards, 0:13; East Tennessee State 14–0)
- (7:55) ETSU – Karim Page 26-yard pass from Jacolby Criswell, Ewan Johnson kick (Drive: 9 plays, 92 yards, 3:49; East Tennessee State 21–0)
- (3:01) SAM – CJ Evans 20-yard pass from Quincy Crittendon, Jake Garner kick (Drive: 10 plays, 83 yards, 4:47; East Tennessee State 21–7)

Second Quarter

- (8:20) ETSU – Ewan Johnson 46-yard field goal (Drive: 8 plays, 28 yards, 2:41; East Tennessee State 24–7)

Third Quarter

- (12:39) ETSU – Charlie Browder 10-yard pass from Jacolby Criswell, Ewan Johnson kick (Drive: 6 plays, 77 yards, 1:39; East Tennessee State 31–7)
- (9:57) ETSU – Devontae Houston 40-yard run, Ewan Johnson kick (Drive: 3 plays, 60 yards, 0:54; East Tennessee State 38–7)

Fourth Quarter

- (4:55) SAM – Calvin Jones 25-yard pass from Brady Stober, Jake Garner kick (Drive: 12 plays, 93 yards, 4:16; East Tennessee State 38–14)

Statistics	ETSU	SAM
First downs	25	16
Total yards	600	312
Rushing yards	237	56
Passing yards	363	256
Passing: Comp–Att–Int	23–36–0	21–39–1
Time of possession	29:59	30:01

Team	Category	Player	Statistics
East Tennessee State	Passing	Jacolby Criswell	19/30, 261 yards, 2 TD
East Tennessee State	Rushing	Devontae Houston	18 carries, 151 yards, 2 TD
East Tennessee State	Receiving	Xavier Gaillardetz	3 receptions, 113 yards, TD
Samford	Passing	Brady Stober	12/26, 141 yards, TD
Samford	Rushing	Quincy Crittendon	6 carries, 30 yards
Samford	Receiving	Samuel Pickett III	3 receptions, 90 yards

=== at No. 25 Western Carolina ===
East Tennessee State Buccaneers (5-5) vs. No. 25 Western Carolina Catamounts (6-4) – Game summary

Quarter	1	2	3	4	Total
Buccaneers	10	14	14	14	52
No. 25 Catamounts	0	28	7	0	35

at Bob Waters Field at E. J. Whitmire Stadium • Cullowhee, NC

- Date: November 15
- Game time: 12:00 p.m. EST
- Game weather: Clear • Temperature: 60 °F (16 °C) • Wind: NW at 4 miles per hour (6.4 km/h)
- Game attendance: 10,543
- Referee: Brice Austin
- TV announcers (ESPN+): Pete Yanity (play-by-play), Jay Sonnhalter (analyst) and Dave Friedman (sideline)
- Box Score

Game information

First Quarter

- (10:30) ETSU – Ewan Johnson 21-yard field goal (Drive: 12 plays, 71 yards, 4:30; East Tennessee State 3–0)
- (4:26) ETSU – Jeremiah Harrison 38-yard pass from Jacolby Criswell, Ewan Johnson kick (Drive: 4 plays, 63 yards, 1:48; East Tennessee State 10–0)

Second Quarter

- (14:56) WCU – Jordan Durham-Martin 1-yard run, Marcus Trout kick (Drive: 14 plays, 74 yards, 4:25; East Tennessee State 10–7)
- (8:36) WCU – Markel Townsend 1-yard run, Marcus Trout kick (Drive: 9 plays, 71 yards, 3:10; Western Carolina 14–10)
- (7:11) WCU – Cam'Ron Dabney 43-yard fumble recovery, Marcus Trout kick (Western Carolina 21–10)
- (5:22) ETSU – Hakeem Meggett 38-yard pass from Jacolby Criswell, Ewan Johnson kick (Drive: 5 plays, 75 yards, 1:49; Western Carolina 21–17)
- (3:22) WCU – Jaylin Terzado 58-yard pass from Taron Dickens, Marcus Trout kick (Drive: 5 plays, 75 yards, 1:54; Western Carolina 28–17)
- (0:23) ETSU – Cole Keller 6-yard pass from Jacolby Criswell, Ewan Johnson kick (Drive: 12 plays, 75 yards, 2:59; Western Carolina 28–24)

Third Quarter

- (8:45) ETSU – Ephraim Floyd 5-yard pass from Jackson Byrd, Ewan Johnson kick (Drive: 9 plays, 63 yards, 3:42; East Tennessee State 31–28)
- (2:08) WCU – Michael Rossin 61-yard pass from Taron Dickens, Marcus Trout kick (Drive: 4 plays, 79 yards, 1:29; Western Carolina 35–31)
- (1:04) ETSU – Hakeem Meggett 42-yard pass from Jackson Byrd, Ewan Johnson kick (Drive: 3 plays, 75 yards, 1:04; East Tennessee State 38–35)

Fourth Quarter

- (14:59) ETSU – Jason Albritton 1-yard run, Ewan Johnson kick (Drive: 2 plays, 5 yards, 0:06; East Tennessee State 45–35)
- (2:18) ETSU – Jeremiah Harrison 32-yard pass from Jackson Byrd, Ewan Johnson kick (Drive: 10 plays, 99 yards, 3:33; East Tennessee State 52–35)

Statistics	ETSU	WCU
First downs	33	25
Total yards	638	529
Rushing yards	244	103
Passing yards	394	426
Passing: Comp–Att–Int	22–37–0	33–48–0
Time of possession	30:35	29:25

Team	Category	Player	Statistics
East Tennessee State	Passing	Jacolby Criswell	17/29, 271 yards, 3 TD
East Tennessee State	Rushing	Jason Albritton	20 carries, 125 yards, TD
East Tennessee State	Receiving	Jeremiah Harrison	5 receptions, 139 yards, 2 TD
Western Carolina	Passing	Taron Dickens	33/48, 426 yards, 2 TD
Western Carolina	Rushing	Taron Dickens	11 carries, 48 yards
Western Carolina	Receiving	Michael Rossin	4 receptions, 89 yards, TD

=== The Citadel ===
The Citadel Bulldogs (4-7) vs. East Tennessee State Buccaneers (6-5) – Game summary

Quarter	1	2	3	4	Total
Bulldogs	7	7	3	9	26
Buccaneers	14	14	0	0	28

at William B. Greene Jr. Stadium • Johnson City, TN

- Date: November 22
- Game time: 1:00 p.m. EST
- Game weather: Cloudy • Temperature: 63 °F (17 °C) • Wind: E at 10 miles per hour (16 km/h)
- Game attendance: 9,049
- Referee: Jake Grombach
- TV announcers (ESPN+): Keith Brake (play-by-play), Mark Hutsell (analyst) and Kennedy Story (sideline)
- Box Score

Game information

First Quarter

- (12:58) CIT – Garrison Johnson 63-yard run, Ben Barnes kick (Drive: 1 play, 63 yards, 0:12; The Citadel 7–0)
- (8:41) ETSU – Devontae Houston 1-yard run, Ewan Johnson kick (Drive: 12 plays, 75 yards, 4:17; Tied 7–7)
- (1:27) ETSU – Karim Page 17-yard pass from Jacolby Criswell, Ewan Johnson kick (Drive: 11 plays, 80 yards, 3:59; East Tennessee State 14–7)

Second Quarter

- (8:48) ETSU – Jason Albritton 1-yard run, Ewan Johnson kick (Drive: 9 plays, 56 yards, 3:29; East Tennessee State 21–7)
- (2:59) CIT – Beau Herrington 2-yard run, Ben Barnes kick (Drive: 11 plays, 75 yards, 5:49; East Tennessee State 21–14)
- (0:42) ETSU – Devontae Houston 15-yard run, Ewan Johnson kick (Drive: 9 plays, 74 yards, 2:12; East Tennessee State 28–14)

Third Quarter

- (7:51) CIT – Ben Barnes 31-yard field goal (Drive: 13 plays, 62 yards, 7:09; East Tennessee State 28–17)

Fourth Quarter

- (13:34) CIT – Jihad Marks 39-yard pass from Quentin Hayes (Drive: 6 plays, 80 yards, 3:30; East Tennessee State 28–23)
- (7:37) CIT – Ben Barnes 33-yard field goal (Drive: 9 plays, 37 yards, 4:35; East Tennessee State 28–26)

Statistics	CIT	ETSU
First downs	22	23
Total yards	431	409
Rushing yards	218	165
Passing yards	213	244
Passing: Comp–Att–Int	12–20–2	18–26–1
Time of possession	32:00	28:00

Team	Category	Player	Statistics
The Citadel	Passing	Quentin Hayes	11/18, 200 yards, TD, 2 INT
The Citadel	Rushing	Quentin Hayes	18 carries, 103 yards
The Citadel	Receiving	Javonte Graves-Billips	4 receptions, 52 yards
East Tennessee State	Passing	Jacolby Criswell	18/26, 244 yards, TD, INT
East Tennessee State	Rushing	Devontae Houston	28 carries, 125 yards, 2 TD
East Tennessee State	Receiving	Charlie Browder	3 receptions 55 yards
