= Tyrone Riley =

American football player (born 1996)

No. 62
- Position: Offensive tackle

Personal information
- Born: October 26, 1996 (age 30)
- Listed height: 6 ft 6 in (1.98 m)
- Listed weight: 291 lb (132 kg)

Career information
- High school: Calvary (Savannah, Georgia)
- College: NC State (2015–2021)
- NFL draft: 2022: undrafted

Career history
- Hamilton Tiger-Cats (2022–2023)
- Stats at CFL.ca

Tyrone Riley (born October 26, 1996) is an American former professional football offensive tackle who played for the Hamilton Tiger-Cats of the Canadian Football League (CFL). He spent seven seasons of college football with the NC State Wolfpack (three at defensive end and four at offensive tackle). He suffered numerous ailments in college, including two broken feet, plantar fasciitis, a torn bicep, shoulder surgery, groin surgery, and a case of summer pneumonia.

== Early life ==
Tyrone Riley was born on October 26, 1996. He played high school football at Calvary Day School in Savannah, Georgia, as a defensive end. He made 85 tackles his junior year. As a senior, Riley posted eight sacks and 22 tackles-for-loss. In the class of 2015, he was rated the No. 51 outside linebacker in the country by ESPN.com, No. 27 weakside defensive end by Rivals.com, and the No. 124 defensive end by Scout.com. Riley also played basketball in high school.

== College career ==
After receiving nearly a dozen college football offers from Division I schools, Riley committed to the University of Kentucky. However, he later switched to North Carolina State University to play defensive end for the Wolfpack. He redshirted the 2015 season and was a letterman in 2016, 2017, 2018, and 2020. He posted one assisted tackle in one game as a true freshman in 2015 but took a redshirt after developing plantar fasciitis. Riley appeared in 11 of 13 games in a reserve role in 2016, recording seven solo tackles, two assisted tackles, and one sack while missing two games due to a torn bicep. He played in all 13 games as a backup defensive end in 2017, totaling two solo tackles, one assisted tackle, and one blocked punt.

Riley missed 2018 spring practice due to shoulder surgery. He was "slowed" during preseason camp because of pneumonia. Riley later said "It's summertime, it's really hot outside. Like how do [you] catch pneumonia during that time? How unlucky can I get?" He was moved to offensive tackle for the 2018 season. He played in 12 of 13 games in 2018, and made his first two career starts. Riley graduated from NC State in December 2018 with a sport management degree. He then began working towards a master's degree in parks, recreation, tourism and sport management. He had groin surgery in spring 2019 due to a sports hernia. He was the projected starter at left tackle in 2019 but ended up missing the entire season after breaking his right foot. The NCAA granted him a medical hardship waiver that allowed him to return to the team in 2020. Riley missed 2020 spring drills. In August 2020, all college football players were given one extra year of eligbiity due to the COVID-19 pandemic. Riley started the first four games of the 2020 season at left tackle and the fifth game at right tackle before missing the rest of the year with a broken left foot. He was the anticipated starter at right tackle in 2021 but was moved to a reserve role before the season. The Fayetteville Observer noted that Riley joined a "small fraternity of players that have lasted nearly a decade in college football." He missed some games due to injury but returned to the team in late October. He did not end up playing in a game all year.

== Professional career ==
After going unselected in the 2022 NFL draft, Riley signed with the Hamilton Tiger-Cats of the Canadian Football League (CFL) on May 23, 2022. He was moved to the practice roster on June 5. He was promoted to the active roster to start at right tackle after the team's offensive line was reshuffled due to injury. Riley was placed on injured reserve on June 30, moved back to the practice roster on July 13, and promoted to the active roster again on September 15, 2022. He dressed in eight games overall (all starts) for the Tiger-Cats during the 2022 season, posting one tackle and one fumble recovery. He was named to the 3DownNation 2022 CFL all-rookie team.

Riley was placed on injured reserve on June 17, 2023, activated on July 12, placed on injured reserve again on July 27, moved to the practice roster on September 14, and promoted to the active roster again on September 22, 2023. He dressed in eight games, all starts, for Hamilton for the second straight season while also recovering one fumble. His contract expired on February 13, 2024, and he became a free agent.
