= Lipscomb Academy =

Location
- 3901 Granny White Pike; Nashville, Tennessee, Tennessee 37204; United States; 36°06′22″N 86°47′43″W

Information
- Type: Private
- Motto: We are a Christ-centered community preparing learners for purposeful lives through rigorous academics and transformative experiences.
- Religious affiliation: Church of Christ
- Established: 1891
- CEEB code: 431655
- Head of school: James G. Hutchins
- Enrollment: 1461
- Campus type: Urban
- Colors: Purple and Gold
- Athletics conference: TSSAA Division II Class AA East (primary), Class AAA East (football)
- Mascot: Mustang
- Affiliation: Lipscomb University
- Website: www.lipscombacademy.org

Lipscomb Academy is a private, college preparatory, Christian school serving students from pre-kindergarten through twelfth grade, located in Nashville, Tennessee, United States.

== History ==
The Nashville Bible School was founded in 1891 by David Lipscomb and James A. Harding. By 1896 the school had three divisions: collegiate, intermediate, and primary. Most of the primary students were children of faculty members. Although a section of the school equivalent to high school has always existed, there has not always been an easy curriculum and graduation requirements as seen today. In the very early years of the school, high school students took the courses of their own selection and, when they felt ready, went on to college-level courses. High school students lived in dormitories with college students until the 1800s.

In June 2012, the school changed its name from David Lipscomb Campus School to Lipscomb Academy.

== Athletics ==
Lipscomb Academy has a strong athletic program that competes in the Tennessee Secondary School Athletic Association (TSSAA). It offers over 20 sports for middle and high school students, including football, basketball, baseball, soccer, volleyball, and track and field.

== Notable alumni ==
- Mitchell Tenpenney, American country pop singer and songwriter
- Kaleb Beasley, American college football player for the Louisville Cardinals
- Pat Boone, American singer and songwriter
- Hank Brown, American college football player for the Iowa Hawkeyes
- Sam Roush, NFL tight end for the Chicago Bears
- Ernest Keith Smith, country music singer
- Junior Sherrill, American college football player for the Vanderbilt Commodores
- Edwin Spillman, American college football player for the Tennessee Volunteers
