= Nolan Smith (American football) =

American football player (born 2001)

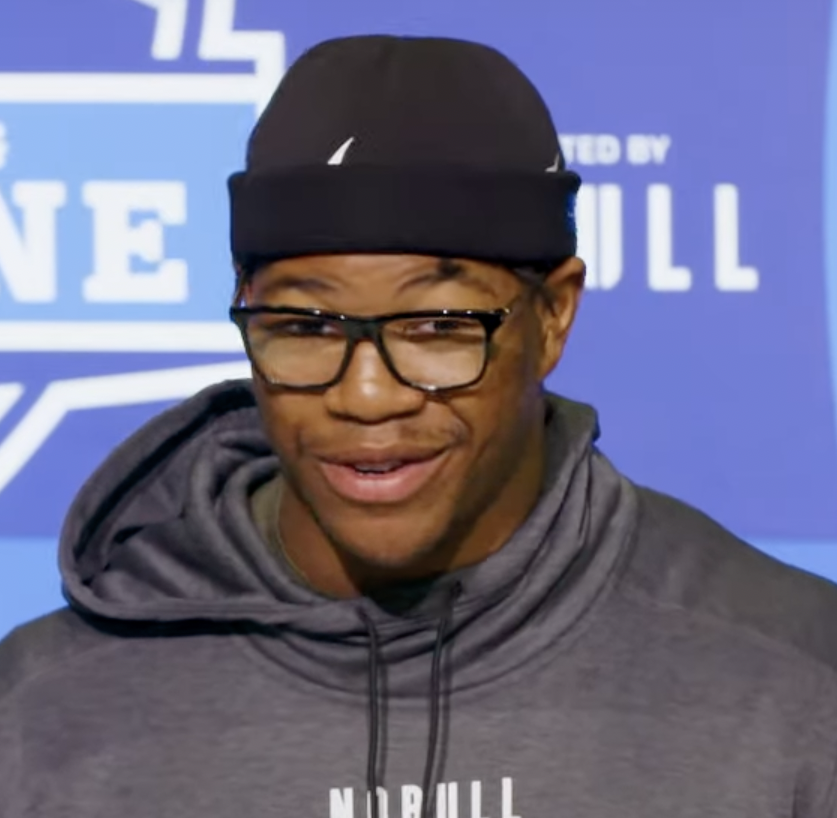
- Smith at the 2023 NFL Combine

No. 3 – Philadelphia Eagles
- Position: Outside linebacker
- Roster status: Active

Personal information
- Born: January 18, 2001 (age 25); Savannah, Georgia, U.S.
- Listed height: 6 ft 2 in (1.88 m)
- Listed weight: 238 lb (108 kg)

Career information
- High school: IMG Academy (Bradenton, Florida)
- College: Georgia (2019–2022)
- NFL draft: 2023: 1st round, 30th overall pick

Career history
- Philadelphia Eagles (2023–present)

Awards and highlights
- Super Bowl champion (LIX); 2× CFP national champion (2021, 2022)

Career NFL statistics as of 2025
- Total tackles: 93
- Sacks: 10.5
- Forced fumbles: 2
- Fumble recoveries: 2
- Pass deflections: 3
- Stats at Pro Football Reference

Nolan Sental Smith Jr. (born January 18, 2001) is an American professional football outside linebacker for the Philadelphia Eagles of the National Football League (NFL). He played college football for the Georgia Bulldogs, where he was a two-time CFP national champion before being selected by the Eagles in the first round of the 2023 NFL draft.

== Early life ==
Smith played for IMG Academy in high school but also attended Calvary Day School in Savannah, Georgia. Over the course of two years, Smith played in 15 games totaling 88 tackles, 10.5 sacks, an interception, and a forced fumble. Nolan was rated as the number one player in the country and 20th best all-time by 247Sports.com and his comparison was Pro Bowl pass rusher Khalil Mack. As a senior he was named to the USA Today All-USA high school football team and a first-team All-American by MaxPreps. Smith signed to play college football for the University of Georgia.

== College career ==
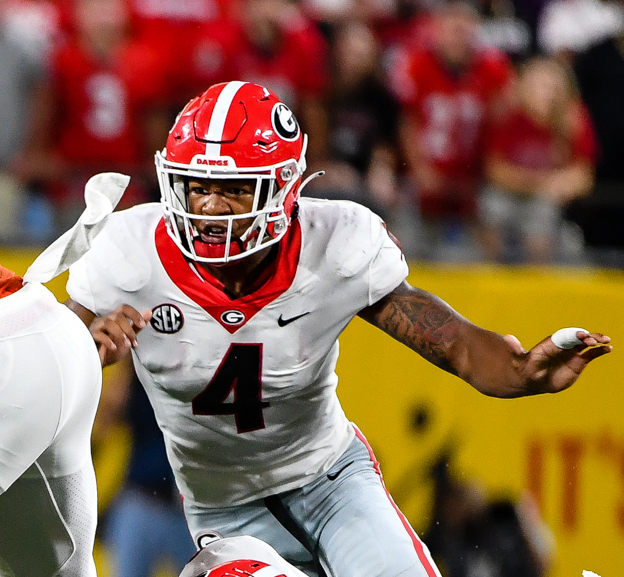
Smith with Georgia in 2021

Smith saw 11 games in his freshman season. In these games Smith recorded 18 tackles and 2.5 sacks. In the home opener against Murray State, Smith had 1.5 sacks and 3 tackles.

Smith played in all 10 regular season games. In these games Nolan's stat line was 22 tackles and 2.5 sacks. Smith started his first game against Tennessee. In this game he would only have one tackle. In the season opener vs Arkansas, Smith would tally 6 tackles and 1.5 sacks.

Smith played in 11 games. In the SEC opener against South Carolina, Smith would record a career high 8 tackles and he would also force a fumble. In the game vs Vanderbilt, Smith was named a team captain. Against rival Florida, Smith forced a fumble and got his first interception of his career in just a 39-second span. Against Missouri, Smith blocked a punt that resulted in a safety. Smith's final stats were 40 tackles, 1.5 sacks, 2 forced fumbles, and one interception. Smith announced that he would return to Georgia for his senior season in 2022 rather than enter the 2022 NFL draft.

On October 29, 2022, Smith exited the game against Florida, tearing a pectoral muscle and prematurely ending his season. Smith finished the season with seven tackles, three sacks, and 16 quarterback hurries.

== Professional career ==
Smith ran a 4.39-second 40-yard dash at the 2023 NFL Combine, making him the second-fastest defensive lineman since 2003 after Amaré Barno (2022).

Pre-draft measurables
| Height | Weight | Arm length | Hand span | Wingspan | 40-yard dash | 10-yard split | 20-yard split | Vertical jump | Broad jump |
|---|---|---|---|---|---|---|---|---|---|
| 6 ft 2 1/4 in (1.89 m) | 238 lb (108 kg) | 32 5/8 in (0.83 m) | 9 in (0.23 m) | 6 ft 9 in (2.06 m) | 4.39 s | 1.52 s | 2.51 s | 41.5 in (1.05 m) | 10 ft 8 in (3.25 m) |
All values from the NFL Combine

Smith was selected by the Philadelphia Eagles 30th overall in the first round of the 2023 NFL draft.

In his rookie season, Smith earned roles on the defense and special teams units, playing in all 17 regular season games. His role in the defense was limited as a reserve behind Pro-Bowler Haason Reddick. He finished his rookie season, recording 18 tackles and a sack.

In 2024, Smith recorded 6.5 sacks, 11 quarterback hits, and 24 QB pressures in the regular season. Ahead of Super Bowl LIX, Smith had recorded 4 sacks in the postseason, surpassing Reddick's single postseason franchise record of 3.5 sacks in 2022. He had two quarterback hits in Super Bowl LIX, a 40–22 win over the Kansas City Chiefs. On February 21, 2025, it was revealed that Smith underwent surgery for torn triceps, an injury that he sustained during the Super Bowl.

On September 24, 2025, Smith was placed on injured reserve after aggravating his surgically repaired triceps injury in Week 3 against the Los Angeles Rams. He was activated on November 10, ahead of the team's Week 10 matchup against the Green Bay Packers.

On April 27, 2026, the Eagles exercised the fifth-year option on Smith's contract.

== Legal issues ==
On May 15, 2026, Smith was arrested in Twiggs County, Georgia for both speeding in excess of maxiumum limits (state speed and zone limits) and reckless driving after driving 135 mph in a 70 mph zone. He was soon released. A court date was set for Smith on July 14, 2026, though he can avoid this court appearance if he pays the fines which are associated with the citations he was given.

== NFL career statistics ==
Legend
| | Won the Super Bowl |
| | Led the league |
| **Bold** | Career high |

| Year | Team | Games | | Tackles | | | | | Fumbles | | | Interceptions | | | | | |
| Year | Team | GP | GS | Cmb | Solo | Ast | TFL | Sck | FF | FR | Yds | Int | Yds | Avg | Lng | TD | PD |
|---|---|---|---|---|---|---|---|---|---|---|---|---|---|---|---|---|---|
| 2023 | PHI | **17** | 0 | 18 | 10 | 8 | 1 | 1.0 | 0 | 0 | 0 | 0 | 0 | 0.0 | 0 | 0 | 0 |
| 2024 | PHI | 16 | **10** | **42** | **21** | **21** | **8** | **6.5** | **1** | **2** | 0 | 0 | 0 | 0.0 | 0 | 0 | **2** |
| 2025 | PHI | 12 | 12 | 31 | 15 | 16 | 1 | 3.0 | **1** | 0 | 0 | 0 | 0 | 0.0 | 0 | 0 | 0 |
| Career | | 45 | 22 | 91 | 46 | 45 | 10 | 10.5 | 2 | 2 | 0 | 0 | 0 | 0.0 | 0 | 0 | 2 |

=== Postseason ===
| Year | Team | Games | | Tackles | | | | | | Fumbles | | | |
| Year | Team | GP | GS | Cmb | Solo | Ast | TFL | Sck | Sfty | FF | FR | Yds | TD |
|---|---|---|---|---|---|---|---|---|---|---|---|---|---|
| 2023 | PHI | 1 | 0 | 4 | 1 | 3 | 0 | 0.5 | 0 | 0 | 0 | 0 | 0 |
| 2024 | PHI | **4** | **4** | **16** | **7** | **9** | **4** | **4.0** | 0 | **1** | 0 | 0 | 0 |
| 2025 | PHI | 1 | 1 | 4 | 3 | 1 | 1 | 0.0 | 0 | 0 | 0 | 0 | 0 |
| Career | | 6 | 5 | 24 | 11 | 13 | 5 | 4.5 | 0 | 1 | 0 | 0 | 0 |
