= Jake Merklinger =

American football player (born 2005)

No. 4 – UConn Huskies
- Position: Quarterback
- Class: Redshirt Junior

Personal information
- Born: August 31, 2005 (age 21)
- Listed height: 6 ft 3 in (1.91 m)
- Listed weight: 215 lb (98 kg)

Career information
- High school: Calvary Day School (Savannah, Georgia)
- College: Tennessee (2024–2025); UConn (2026–present)
- Stats at ESPN

Jacob Tyler Merklinger (born August 31, 2005) is an American college football quarterback for the UConn Huskies. He played previously for the Tennessee Volunteers.

== Early life ==
Merklinger attended Calvary Day School. As a junior, he completed 67 percent of his passes for 1,987 yards, 32 touchdowns and two interceptions and rushed for 283 yards and four touchdowns. As a senior, Merklinger threw for 3,028 yards and 38 touchdowns against two interceptions and added 439 yards and 11 touchdowns on the ground. He finished his high school career with a 42–10 record, tallying 145 total touchdowns, amassing 113 through the air and 32 on the ground.

Merklinger was rated as a four-star recruit and committed to play college football for the Tennessee Volunteers over offers from schools such as Georgia, Michigan State, and North Carolina.

== College career ==
=== Tennessee ===
As a freshman in 2024, Merklinger appeared in two games, where he completed six of nine pass attempts for 48 yards and rushed for 22 yards.

=== UConn ===
On January 15, 2026, Merklinger committed to transfer to University of Connecticut.

=== Statistics ===
Season	Team	Games			Passing								Rushing			
Season	Team	GP	GS	Record	Cmp	Att	Pct	Yds	Y/A	TD	Int	Rtg	Att	Yds	Avg	TD
2024	Tennessee	2	0	—	6	9	66.7	48	5.3	0	0	111.5	7	22	3.1	0
2025	Tennessee	4	0	—	13	24	54.2	173	7.2	2	0	142.2	4	16	4.0	0
2026	UConn	0	0	—	0	0	0.0	0	0.0	0	0	0.0	0	0	0.0	0
Career		6	0	0–0	18	33	57.6	221	6.7	2	0	133.8	11	38	3.5	0
