= Kaleb Beasley =

American football player (born 2005)

No. 10 – Louisville Cardinals
- Position: Safety
- Class: Junior

Personal information
- Born: December 29, 2005 (age 20); Daytona, Florida, U.S.
- Listed height: 6 ft 1 in (1.85 m)
- Listed weight: 200 lb (91 kg)

Career information
- High school: Lipscomb Academy (Nashville, Tennessee)
- College: Tennessee (2024–2025); Louisville (2026–present)
- Stats at ESPN

Kaleb Radon Beasley (born December 29, 2005) is an American college football safety for the Louisville Cardinals. He previously played for the Tennessee Volunteers.

== Early life ==
Beasley attended Lipscomb Academy in Nashville, Tennessee, where he played cornerback. As a junior in 2022, he was named The Tennessean Defensive Player of the Year after recording 30 tackles, nine interceptions and six defensive touchdowns. For his career he totaled 24 interceptions. Beasley was selected to play in the 2024 Under Armour All-America Game. He committed to the University of Tennessee to play college football.

== College career ==
Beasley played cornerback and special teams his true freshman year at Tennessee in 2024, recording four tackles. He was moved to safety in 2025 and had 24 tackles over 13 games. After the season, Beasley entered the transfer portal and committed to the University of Louisville. He entered his first season at Louisville in 2026 as a starter.
