= Calvary Day School =

Independent school in Savannah, Georgia, United States

Location
- 4625 Waters Avenue; Savannah, Georgia, Chatham County 31404; United States; 32°01′59″N 81°05′35″W

Information
- Type: Independent
- Motto: "Faith Academics Excellence"
- Religious affiliation: Christian
- Established: 1961 (65 years ago)
- CEEB code: 112676
- NCES School ID: 00298693
- Head of school: Hunter Chadwick
- Faculty: 62.0 (on an FTE basis)
- Grades: 6 weeks old through 12 grade
- Enrollment: 1224
- Student to teacher ratio: 17
- Campus type: Urban
- Colors: Purple and gold
- Athletics: Football, basketball, baseball, golf, cross country, ladies flag football, softball, swim, soccer, wrestling, lacrosse, track and field, cheer, clay shooting, bass fishing, and tennis
- Athletics conference: Georgia High School Association
- Mascot: Cavaliers
- Website: www.calvarydayschool.com

Calvary Day School is an Independent Christian school located in Savannah, Georgia, United States. It is associated with the Association of Christian Schools International (ACSI).

== Notable alumni ==
- Jake Merklinger – College football quarterback for the Tennessee Volunteers
- Nolan Smith - NFL player
