= Peyton Lewis =

American football player (born 2005)

Virginia Cavaliers
- Position: Running back
- Class: Sophomore

Personal information
- Born: November 16, 2005 (age 20)
- Listed height: 6 ft 1 in (1.85 m)
- Listed weight: 212 lb (96 kg)

Career information
- High school: Salem (Salem, Virginia)
- College: Tennessee (2024–2025); Virginia (2026–present)
- Stats at ESPN

Peyton O'Neil Lewis (born November 16, 2005) is an American college football running back for the Virginia Cavaliers. He previously played for the Tennessee Volunteers.

== Early life ==
Lewis attended Salem High School in Salem, Virginia. As a junior, Lewis rushed for 1,560 yards and 17 touchdowns, and as a senior, he recorded 30 touchdowns. He finished his high school football career totaling 3,667 career yards and 52 total touchdowns. A four-star recruit, Lewis committed to play college football at the University of Tennessee over offers from Alabama, Auburn, and Florida.

== College career ==
Lewis earned immediate playing time as a true freshman, appearing in 13 games as a reserve. He finished his first season rushing for 339 yards and three touchdowns on 64 carries. Entering the 2025 season, Lewis is part of a three-man running back rotation for Tennessee.

On January 7, 2026, Lewis announced his decision to transfer to the University of Virginia to play for the Virginia Cavaliers.

=== Statistics ===
College statistics
Season	Team	Games	Rushing				Receiving			
Season	Team	GP	Att	Yards	Avg	TD	Rec	Yards	Avg	TD
2024	Tennessee	13	64	339	5.3	3	4	14	3.5	0
2025	Tennessee	10	70	290	4.1	7	4	42	10.5	0
Career		23	134	629	4.7	10	8	56	7.0	0
