= Cade McNamara =

American football player (born 2000)

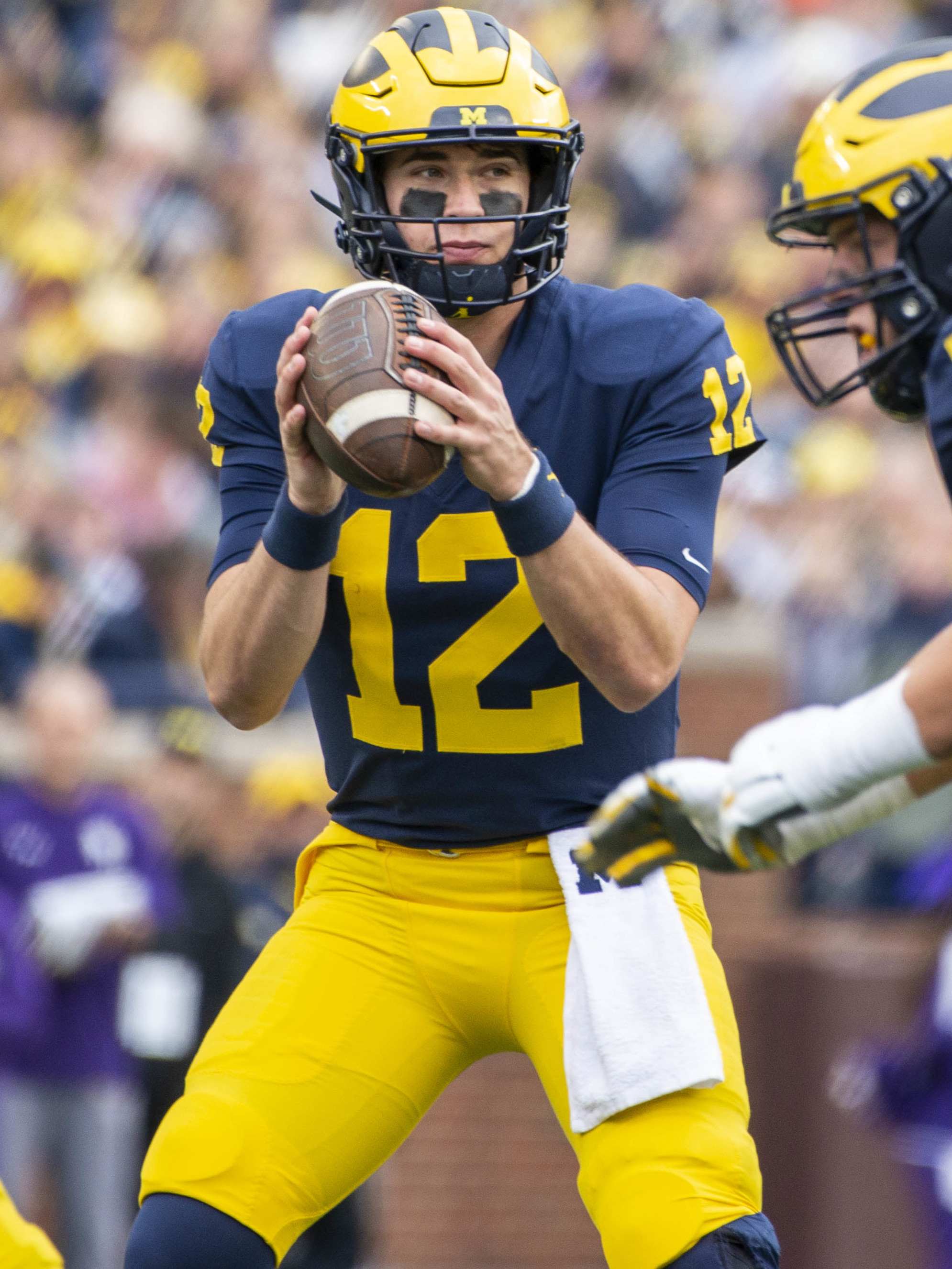
- McNamara with the Michigan Wolverines in 2021

Profile
- Position: Quarterback

Personal information
- Born: May 28, 2000 (age 26); Reno, Nevada, U.S.
- Listed height: 6 ft 1 in (1.85 m)
- Listed weight: 205 lb (93 kg)

Career information
- High school: Damonte Ranch (Reno)
- College: Michigan (2019–2022); Iowa (2023–2024); East Tennessee State (2025)

Awards and highlights
- Third-team All-Big Ten (2021)
- Stats at ESPN

Cade McNamara (born May 28, 2000) is an American football quarterback. He previously played for the Michigan Wolverines, winning a Big Ten Conference title as the starting quarterback in 2021, for the Iowa Hawkeyes, and for the East Tennessee State Buccaneers.

== Early life ==
McNamara was born in 2000. His father, Gary McNamara, played baseball as the starting center fielder at Fresno State in 1992 and 1993 and worked as an assistant coach for the Nevada Wolf Pack baseball team. With encouragement from his father, McNamara initially played baseball as an infielder and pitcher. After his freshman year of high school, he quit baseball to focus on football.

In 2015, McNamara enrolled at Damonte Ranch High School in Reno, Nevada, and became the school's starting quarterback as a freshman. In four years at Damonte, he set Nevada prep football records with 12,804 passing yards and 146 touchdown passes. He was the Gatorade Player of the Year for Nevada in both 2017 and 2018.

== College career ==
=== Michigan ===
Rated as the No. 1 football prospect in Nevada, McNamara initially committed to play for Notre Dame. He rescinded his commitment in February 2018 and announced the following month that he had committed to play for the Michigan Wolverines. McNamara also had offers from Alabama, Georgia, and USC, and credited his choice to Michigan’s head coach Jim Harbaugh. He completed high school in December 2018, allowing him to enroll early at the University of Michigan in January 2019.

McNamara did not see game action during the 2019 football season. On November 14, 2020, McNamara saw his first significant college football game action against Wisconsin. He entered the game in the third quarter with the Wolverines trailing 35–3. On his first drive in the game, he threw a touchdown pass to Mike Sainristil and then threw for a two-point conversion.

On November 21, 2020, McNamara entered Michigan's game against Rutgers in the second quarter with Michigan trailing, 17–0. He led a comeback that ended with a triple-overtime victory by the score of 48 to 42. McNamara completed 27 of 36 passes for 260 yards and four touchdowns and also scored a rushing touchdown. The comeback from a 17-point deficit was the third largest in Michigan history. On November 28, McNamara made his first career start at quarterback, but battled injury, completing 12-of-25 passes for 91 yards in a 27–17 loss to Penn State.

McNamara started all 14 games for the Wolverines in 2021. His best performance came in what would be the team's only regular season loss. On October 30 at Michigan State, McNamara threw for 383 yards on 28-for-44 passing with two touchdowns and an interception in a 37–33 loss to the Spartans. On November 27, he was 13-for-19 with 159 yards and an interception in the Wolverines' 42–27 win over Ohio State, Michigan's first victory against its rival since 2011. The next week, in the Big Ten Championship Game, McNamara threw for 169 yards in a 42–3 blowout of Iowa, clinching the program’s first appearance in the College Football Playoff.

Michigan's 2021 season ended at the Orange Bowl, a College Football Playoff semifinal, with a 34–11 loss to eventual national champion Georgia. Despite throwing just four interceptions all season up to that point, McNamara was picked off twice by Georgia and benched late in the game in favor of backup J. J. McCarthy. On December 16, 2021, McNamara signed a deal with Brady Brand, an apparel company led by former Michigan quarterback Tom Brady.

Prior to the 2022 season, McNamara competed with J. J. McCarthy for the role as Michigan's starting quarterback. McNamara started in week one against Colorado State, going 9-for-18 with 136 yards and a touchdown. McCarthy was named the permanent starter after starring in week two against Hawaii.

McNamara appeared briefly in the Wolverines' games against Hawaii and UConn. In the week three contest with UConn, McNamara injured his right knee. On November 10, McNamara announced that he had undergone knee surgery and intended to play again. He finished the season 14-for-25 with 180 passing yards, a touchdown, and an interception. After Michigan's regular season finale against Ohio State, McNamara entered the NCAA transfer portal.

=== Iowa ===
On December 1, 2022, McNamara transferred to the University of Iowa. He would have two seasons of eligibility left. On September 30, 2023, McNamara suffered a season-ending knee injury in a game against Michigan State. Two days later he announced he would return to Iowa the following season. On December 4, 2024, after his second season at Iowa, McNamara entered the transfer portal for the second time in his career.

=== East Tennessee State ===
On January 10, 2025, McNamara initially committed to play for the Western Kentucky Hilltoppers. On January 18, he instead transferred to East Tennessee State University for his final season, which competes in the NCAA Division I Football Championship Subdivision (FCS).

=== Statistics ===
Season	Team	Games			Passing								Rushing			
Season	Team	GP	GS	Record	Cmp	Att	Pct	Yds	Y/A	TD	Int	Rtg	Att	Yds	Avg	TD
2019	Michigan	Redshirt														
2020	Michigan	4	1	0−1	43	71	60.6	425	6.0	5	0	134.1	5	7	1.4	1
2021	Michigan	14	14	12−2	210	327	64.2	2,576	7.9	15	6	141.9	37	26	0.7	1
2022	Michigan	3	1	1−0	14	25	56.0	180	6.2	1	1	121.7	4	-30	-7.5	0
2023	Iowa	5	5	4−1	46	90	51.1	505	5.6	4	3	106.2	13	-45	-3.5	0
2024	Iowa	8	8	5–3	104	172	60.5	1,017	5.9	6	5	115.8	13	-31	-2.4	0
2025	East Tennessee State	8	8	3–5	124	185	67.0	1,283	6.9	7	6	131.3	35	40	1.1	2
FBS career		34	29	22−7	417	685	60.9	4,703	6.9	31	15	129.1	72	-73	-1.0	2
FCS career		8	8	3−5	124	185	67.0	1,283	6.9	7	6	131.3	35	40	1.1	2

== Professional career ==
After going undrafted in the 2026 NFL draft, McNamara attended rookie minicamp on a tryout basis with the Tennessee Titans.
