= Mariyon Dye =

American football player (born 2006)

No. 9 – Tennessee Volunteers
- Position: Defensive end
- Class: Sophomore

Personal information
- Born: December 5, 2006 (age 19)
- Listed height: 6 ft 5 in (1.96 m)
- Listed weight: 270 lb (122 kg)

Career information
- High school: Elkhart Central (Elkhart, Indiana)
- College: Tennessee (2025–present)
- Stats at ESPN

Mariyon Martice Dye (born December 5, 2006) is an American college football defensive end for the Tennessee Volunteers.

== Early life ==
Dye attended Elkhart Central High School in Elkhart, Indiana. As a senior in 2024, he was the Northern Indiana Conference MVP after recording 48 tackles and three sacks. Over his sophomore and junior seasons he combined for 61 tackles and four sacks. A top-100 recruit in the 2025 class, Dye committed to the University of Tennessee to play college football.

== College career ==
Dye played in seven games his first year at Tennessee in 2025, recording eight tackles and one sack. He returned to Tennessee in 2026 and recorded three sacks over the first two games.
