= Edwin Spillman =

Sierra Leonean gridiron football player (born 2005)

No. 13 – Tennessee Volunteers
- Position: Linebacker
- Class: Redshirt Sophomore

Personal information
- Born: November 5, 2005 (age 21)
- Listed height: 6 ft 1 in (1.85 m)
- Listed weight: 225 lb (102 kg)

Career information
- High school: Lipscomb Academy (Nashville, Tennessee)
- College: Tennessee (2024–present)
- Stats at ESPN

Edwin Michael Spillman (born Abdul Aman Gi Bindu November 5, 2005) is a Sierra Leonean-born American college football linebacker for the Tennessee Volunteers.

== Early life ==
Spillman was born in Sierra Leone and lived in a small village called Shenge. His birth name was Abdul Aman Gi Bindu, and he was the son of a rice and peanut farmer, who died in a ferry accident with several other farmers when Spillman was young. His mother, Konima, tried to raise him and his brothers Foday and Sufian, but without an income, eventually had to put them up for adoption. The three were adopted by an American family and moved to the United States in 2013.

Spillman attended Lipscomb Academy and played football there as a linebacker, helping them to consecutive Division II state championships. Coached by Trent Dilfer, he had his best season as a junior when he totaled 101 tackles, 14.5 tackles-for-loss (TFLs), two sacks and six pass breakups. In his high school career, he posted 305 tackles and 49 tackles-for-loss. He was a MaxPreps Junior All-American and earned selection to the all-state team in 2022, then earned all-region honors in 2023. A four-star prospect, Spillman was ranked a top-10 linebacker recruit nationally and the best player in the state. He committed to play college football for the Tennessee Volunteers, joining his brother Nate.

== College career ==
Spillman redshirted as a true freshman at Tennessee in 2024, appearing in four games while posting six tackles. After an injury to Arion Carter in 2025, he became a starter, leading the team in tackles through 10 games.
