= Chris Brazzell II =

American football player (born 2003)

No. 19 – Carolina Panthers
- Position: Wide receiver
- Roster status: Injured reserve

Personal information
- Born: October 23, 2003 (age 23); Fort Worth, Texas, U.S.
- Listed height: 6 ft 4 in (1.93 m)
- Listed weight: 197 lb (89 kg)

Career information
- High school: Midland Legacy (Midland, Texas)
- College: Tulane (2022–2023); Tennessee (2024–2025)
- NFL draft: 2026: 3rd round, 83rd overall pick

Career history
- Carolina Panthers (2026–present)

Awards and highlights
- First-team All-SEC (2025); Third-team All-AAC (2023)
- Stats at Pro Football Reference

Christopher Brazzell II (born October 23, 2003) is an American professional football wide receiver for the Carolina Panthers of the National Football League (NFL). He played college football for the Tulane Green Wave and Tennessee Volunteers and was selected by the Panthers in the third round of the 2026 NFL draft.

== Early life ==
Brazzell attended Midland Christian School in Midland, Texas where he played football. For his senior year, he transferred from Midland Christian to Midland Legacy. During his senior year, Brazzell recorded 859 yards and 12 touchdowns on 59 catches and was given a three-star rating. On June 9, 2021, He committed to FAU. He decommitted from FAU on December 6th and committed to Tulane on December 13, 2021. He chose Tulane over offers from Southern, Pittsburgh, New Mexico State, and Austin Peay.

College recruiting
| Name | Hometown | School | Height | Weight | Commit date |
|---|---|---|---|---|---|
| Chris Brazzell II; WR | Midland, Texas | Legacy | 6 ft 3 in (1.91 m) | 170 lb (77 kg) | Dec 13, 2021 |
| Chris Brazzell II; WR | Recruit ratings: Rivals: 247Sports: ESPN: (75) | | | | |

== College career ==
=== Tulane ===
Brazzell appeared in two games during the 2022 season and recorded his first career catch against Alcorn State on September 10, 2022.

During his redshirt freshman season in 2023, Brazzell led the Green Wave in receptions and yards. In recognition of his performance, he earned All-American Athletic Conference third-team honors and was selected as a Freshman All-America honorable mention.

On December 4, 2023, Brazzell entered the transfer portal. He was rated a four-star transfer and the 16th-best transfer wide receiver. Almost 40 schools reached out to Brazzell about transferring.

=== Tennessee ===
On December 21, 2023, Brazzell announced he would transfer to Tennessee. In the 2024 season, he had 29 receptions for 333 yards and two touchdowns.

=== Career statistics ===
Legend
| **Bold** | Career high |

| Year | Team | GP | Receiving | | | | |
| Year | Team | GP | Rec | Yds | Avg | Lng | TD |
|---|---|---|---|---|---|---|---|
| 2022 | Tulane | 2 | 1 | 11 | 11.0 | 11 | 0 |
| 2023 | Tulane | **13** | 44 | 711 | 16.2 | 47 | 5 |
| 2024 | Tennessee | **13** | 29 | 333 | 11.5 | 53 | 2 |
| 2025 | Tennessee | 12 | **62** | **1,017** | **16.4** | **72** | **9** |
| Career | | 40 | 136 | 2,072 | 15.2 | 72 | 16 |

== Professional career ==
Pre-draft measurables
| Height | Weight | Arm length | Hand span | Wingspan | 40-yard dash | 10-yard split | 20-yard split |
|---|---|---|---|---|---|---|---|
| 6 ft 4 in (1.93 m) | 198 lb (90 kg) | 32 3/8 in (0.82 m) | 9 in (0.23 m) | 6 ft 8 1/8 in (2.04 m) | 4.37 s | 1.52 s | 2.51 s |
All values from NFL Combine

On April 24, 2026, Brazzell was selected by the Carolina Panthers with the 83rd pick of the 2026 NFL draft. Shortly after being drafted, Brazzell revealed he has been a fan of the Panthers since he was in third grade. During training camp before the regular season started, Brazzell was injured on a non-contact play, resulting in season-ending knee surgery. He was placed on injured reserve on July 31, with the injury being described as an LCL tear.

== Personal life ==
Brazzell is the son of former CFL and NFL receiver Chris Brazzell and Monique Brazzell. His father, while at Blinn College, played under coach Willie Fritz, who would later coach Brazzell for two years at Tulane.

Brazzell has a younger brother, Colin, who plays defensive back at Abilene Christian.
