= Mike Matthews (wide receiver) =

American football player (born 2005)

No. 4 – Tennessee Volunteers
- Position: Wide receiver
- Class: Junior

Personal information
- Born: October 25, 2005 (age 21)
- Listed height: 6 ft 1 in (1.85 m)
- Listed weight: 200 lb (91 kg)

Career information
- High school: Parkview (Lilburn, Georgia)
- College: Tennessee (2024–present)

Awards and highlights
- Polynesian Bowl Offensive MVP (2024)
- Stats at ESPN

Michael Allen Matthews (born October 25, 2005) is an American college football wide receiver for the Tennessee Volunteers.

== Early life ==
Matthews attended Parkview High School in Lilburn, Georgia. He played wide receiver and defensive back in high school. As a senior in 2023, he was the 2023 Region 4-7A Player of the Year after recording 39 receptions for 751 yards and nine touchdowns on offense and 48 tackles and an interception on defense. Matthews played in the 2024 Under Armour All-America Game. A five-star recruit, he committed to the University of Tennessee to play college football.

== College career ==
Matthews played in 11 games his true freshman year at Tennessee and had seven receptions for 90 yards and two touchdowns. After the season he entered the transfer portal, but removed his name and returned to Tennessee in 2025.
