= 2025 Chattanooga Mocs football team =

American college football season

2025 Chattanooga Mocs football
- Conference: Southern Conference
- Record: 5–7 (4–4 SoCon)
- Head coach: Rusty Wright (7th season)
- Offensive coordinator: Joe Pizzo (7th season)
- Defensive coordinator: Mike Yeager (2nd season)
- Home stadium: Finley Stadium

2025 Southern Conference football standings
	Conf.			Overall
Team	W		L	W		L
No. 17 Mercer $^	8	–	0	9	–	3
Western Carolina	6	–	2	7	–	5
East Tennessee State	5	–	3	7	–	5
Wofford	5	–	3	6	–	6
Chattanooga	4	–	4	5	–	7
Furman	4	–	4	6	–	6
The Citadel	3	–	5	4	–	8
Samford	1	–	7	1	–	11
VMI	0	–	8	1	–	11
$ – Conference champion; ^ – FCS playoff participant; Rankings from STATS Poll

The 2025 Chattanooga Mocs football team represented University of Tennessee at Chattanooga as a member of the Southern Conference (SoCon) during the 2025 NCAA Division I FCS football season. The Mocs were led by seventh-year head coach Rusty Wright and played at the Finley Stadium in Chattanooga, Tennessee.

== Schedule ==
Date	Time	Opponent	Site	TV	Result	Attendance
August 30	4:30 p.m.	at Memphis*	Simmons Bank Liberty Stadium; Memphis, TN	ESPN+	L 10–45	25,011
September 6	1:00 p.m.	at No. 17 Tennessee Tech*	Tucker Stadium; Cookeville, TN	ESPN+	L 17–45	4,471
September 13	6:00 p.m.	Stetson*	Finley Stadium; Chattanooga, TN	ESPN+	W 63–0	7,144
September 20	7:00 p.m.	at No. 3 Tarleton State*	Memorial Stadium; Stephenville, TX	ESPN+	L 24–52	23,732
September 27	6:00 p.m.	The Citadel	Finley Stadium; Chattanooga, TN	ESPN+	L 10–28	6,725
October 4	1:30 p.m.	at VMI	Alumni Memorial Field; Lexington, VA	ESPN+	W 21–14	3,865
October 18	1:30 p.m.	East Tennessee State	Finley Stadium; Chattanooga, TN	ESPN+	W 42–38	9,307
October 25	3:30 p.m.	at Samford	Pete Hanna Stadium; Homewood, AL	ESPN+	W 49–13	3,741
November 1	4:00 p.m.	Western Carolina^{†}	Finley Stadium; Chattanooga, TN	ESPN+	L 28–35	7,711
November 8	12:00 p.m.	Furman	Finley Stadium; Chattanooga, TN	ESPN+	W 45–28	6,305
November 15	3:00 p.m.	at No. 8 Mercer	Five Star Stadium; Macon, GA	ESPN+	L 17–63	9,289
November 22	1:30 p.m.	at Wofford	Gibbs Stadium; Spartanburg, SC	ESPN+	L 13–35	3,091
*Non-conference game; ^{†}Homecoming; Rankings from STATS Poll released prior to the game; All times are in Eastern time

== Game summaries ==
=== at Memphis (FBS) ===
Chattanooga Mocs (0–0) at Memphis Tigers (FBS) (0–0) – Game summary

Quarter	1	2	3	4	Total
Mocs	0	3	0	7	10
Tigers (FBS)	14	14	10	7	45

at Simmons Bank Liberty Stadium • Memphis, Tennessee

- Date: August 30
- Game time: 3:30 PM CDT
- Game weather: Sunny, 89 degrees
- Game attendance: 25,011
- Referee: Steven Arnold
- TV announcers (ESPN+): Chris Carlin, Jay Sonnhalter

Game information

First quarter

- MEM – Greg Desrosiers Jr. 8-yard run (Gianni Spetic kick), 7:44. Tigers 7–0. Drive: 8 plays, 38 yards, 4:01.
- MEM – Sutton Smith 35-yard run (Gianni Spetic kick), 2:57. Tigers 14–0. Drive: 7 plays, 62 yards, 2:50.

Second quarter

- MEM – Brendon Lewis 22-yard run (Gianni Spetic kick), 14:18. Tigers 21–0. Drive: 6 plays, 63 yards, 1:57.
- UTC – Jude Kelley 32-yard field goal, 9:20. Tigers 21–3. Drive: 10 plays, 61 yards, 4:58.
- MEM – Cortez Braham Jr. 22-yard pass from Brendon Lewis (Gianni Spetic kick), 6:27. Tigers 28–3. Drive: 7 plays, 73 yards, 2:47.

Third quarter

- MEM – Gianni Spetic 37-yard field goal, 4:09. Tigers 31–3. Drive: 9 plays, 46 yards, 4:52.
- MEM – DeMarco Ward 27-yard interception return (Gianni Spetic kick), 4:02. Tigers 38–3.

Fourth quarter

- UTC – Josh Williams 3-yard pass from Camden Orth (Jude Kelley kick), 12:50. Tigers 38–10. Drive: 12 plays, 75 yards, 6:12.
- MEM – Frank Peasant 12-yard run (Gianni Spetic kick), 2:00. Tigers 45–10. Drive: 9 plays, 76 yards, 5:02.

Statistics	UTC	MEM
First downs	14	24
Plays–yards	56–232	61–432
Rushes–yards	37–118	33–233
Passing yards	114	199
Passing: comp–att–int	12–19–2	22–28–1
Turnovers	2	1
Time of possession	31:33	28:27

Team	Category	Player	Statistics
Chattanooga	Passing	Camden Orth	12/19, 114 yards, TD, 2 INT
Chattanooga	Rushing	Ryan Ingram	8 carries, 68 yards
Chattanooga	Receiving	Markell Quick	4 receptions, 40 yards
Memphis	Passing	Brendon Lewis	22/28, 199 yards, TD, INT
Memphis	Rushing	Brendon Lewis	10 carries, 81 yards, TD
Memphis	Receiving	Cortez Braham Jr.	3 receptions, 52 yards, TD

=== at No. 17 Tennessee Tech ===
Chattanooga Mocs (0-1) at No. 17 Tennessee Tech Golden Eagles (1-0) – Game summary

Quarter	1	2	3	4	Total
Mocs	3	0	7	7	17
No. 17 Golden Eagles	21	3	14	7	45

at Tucker Stadium • Cookeville, TN

- Date: September 6
- Game time: 1:30 PM CDT
- Game weather: Cloudy • Temperature: 67 °F (19 °C)
- Game attendance: 4,471
- Referee: Drew Myers
- TV announcers (ESPN+): Dylan Vazzano (play-by-play) and Sam Brooks (analyst)

Statistics	UTC	TNTC
First downs	15	22
Total yards	274	513
Rushing yards	25	221
Passing yards	249	292
Passing: Comp–Att–Int	22–45–1	19–28–1
Time of possession	32:42	27:18

Team	Category	Player	Statistics
Chattanooga	Passing	Camden Orth	22/45, 249 yards, TD, INT
Chattanooga	Rushing	Ryan Ingram	12 carries, 22 yards, TD
Chattanooga	Receiving	Markell Quick	5 receptions, 94 yards, TD
Tennessee Tech	Passing	Kekoa Visperas	18/27, 240 yards, 2 TD, INT
Tennessee Tech	Rushing	Quintell Quinn	6 carries, 76 yards, TD
Tennessee Tech	Receiving	Tre' Holloway	4 receptions, 74 yards

=== Stetson ===
Stetson Hatters (1-1) vs. Chattanooga Mocs (0-2) – Game summary

Quarter	1	2	3	4	Total
Hatters	0	0	0	0	0
Mocs	21	14	21	7	63

at Finley Stadium • Chattanooga, TN

- Date: September 13
- Game time: 6:00 PM EDT
- Game weather: Sunny • Temperature: 85 °F (29 °C)
- Game attendance: 7,144
- Referee: Jason Graham
- TV announcers (ESPN+): Chris Goforth (play-by-play), Chris Barnett (analyst) and Mackenzie Johnson (sideline)

Statistics	STET	UTC
First downs	8	24
Total yards	126	539
Rushing yards	29	445
Passing yards	97	94
Passing: Comp–Att–Int	20-34-1	7-14-1
Time of possession	24:31	35:29

Team	Category	Player	Statistics
Stetson	Passing	Kael Alexander	15/24, 79 yds, 1 INT
Stetson	Rushing	Trey Clark	11 carries, 24 yards
Stetson	Receiving	Anthony Benzija	2 receptions, 25 yards
Chattanooga	Passing	Camden Orth	7/14, 94 yards, 2 TD, 1 INT
Chattanooga	Rushing	Camden Orth	11 carries, 118 yards, 3 TD
Chattanooga	Receiving	Jamarii Robinson	2 receptions, 41 yards, 1 TD

=== at No. 3 Tarleton State ===
Chattanooga Mocs (1-2) vs. No. 3 Tarleton State Texans (4-0) – Game summary

Quarter	1	2	3	4	Total
Mocs	14	0	3	7	24
No. 3 Texans	10	20	15	7	52

at Memorial Stadium • Stephenville, TX

- Date: September 20
- Game time: 6:00 PM CDT
- Game weather: Sunny
- Game attendance: 23,732
- Referee: Matthew Jones
- TV announcers (ESPN+): John Liddle (play-by-play), LaDarrin McLane (analyst) and Laura Sadler (sideline)

Statistics	UTC	TAR
First downs	18	20
Total yards	409	578
Rushing yards	292	172
Passing yards	117	404
Passing: Comp–Att–Int	7-14-1	11-18-0
Time of possession	27:53	32:07

Team	Category	Player	Statistics
Chattanooga	Passing	Camden Orth	7/14, 117 yards, 1 INT
Chattanooga	Rushing	Camden Orth	11 carries, 99 yards
Chattanooga	Receiving	Josh Williams	3 receptions, 64 yards
Tarleton State	Passing	Daniel Greek	11/18, 214 yards, 2 TD
Tarleton State	Rushing	Tre Page lll	14 carries, 110 yards, 1 TD
Tarleton State	Receiving	Peyton Kramer	7 receptions, 190 yards, 3 TD

=== The Citadel ===
The Citadel Bulldogs (1-3) vs. Chattanooga Mocs (1-3) – Game summary

Quarter	1	2	3	4	Total
Bulldogs	7	14	7	0	28
Mocs	7	3	0	0	10

at Finley Stadium • Chattanooga, TN

- Date: September 27
- Game time: 6:00 PM EDT
- Game weather: Sunny • Temperature: 83 °F (28 °C) • Wind: N at 8 miles per hour (13 km/h)
- Game attendance: 6,725
- Referee: Michael Farmer
- TV announcers (ESPN+): Chris Goforth (play-by-play), Chris Barnett (analyst) and Mackenzie Johnson (sideline)

Statistics	CIT	UTC
First downs	26	15
Total yards	433	321
Rushing yards	336	120
Passing yards	97	201
Passing: Comp–Att–Int	11-14-0	15-24-1
Time of possession	36:13	23:47

Team	Category	Player	Statistics
The Citadel	Passing	Quentin Hayes	7/8, 63 yards
The Citadel	Rushing	Quentin Hayes	16 carries, 103 yards, 2 TD
The Citadel	Receiving	Javonte Graves-Billips	5 receptions, 37 yards
Chattanooga	Passing	Camden Orth	15/24, 201 yards, 1 INT
Chattanooga	Rushing	Justus Durant	15 carries, 74 yards, 1 TD
Chattanooga	Receiving	Jamarii Robinson	5 receptions, 89 yards

=== at VMI ===
Chattanooga Mocs (1-4) vs. VMI Keydets (1-3) – Game summary

Quarter	1	2	3	4	Total
Mocs	0	14	7	0	21
Keydets	0	3	8	3	14

at Alumni Memorial Field • Lexington, VA

- Date: October 4
- Game time: 1:30 PM EDT
- Game weather: Sunny • Temperature: 73 °F (23 °C)
- Game attendance: 3,865
- Referee: Jason Graham
- TV announcers (ESPN+): Wade Branner (play-by-play) and Phil Marcello (analyst)

Game information

First Quarter

No scoring plays

Second Quarter

- (14:54) UTC – Josh Williams 6-yard pass from Camden Orth, Jude Kelley kick (Drive: 9 plays, 72 yards, 5:59; Chattanooga 7–0)
- (8:13) VMI – Ben Shrewsbury 37-yard field goal (Drive: 15 plays, 59 yards, 6:41; Chattanooga 7–3)
- (0:23) UTC – Ryan Ingram 8-yard run, Jude Kelley kick (Drive: 9 plays, 99 yards, 2:50; Chattanooga 14–3)

Third Quarter

- (6:14) VMI – Anthony Allen 75-yard interception, Leo Boehling pass (Chattanooga 14–11)
- (2:10) UTC – Ryan Ingram 10-yard run, Jude Kelley kick (Drive: 8 plays, 65 yards, 4:04; Chattanooga 21–11)

Fourth Quarter

- (6:30) VMI – Ben Shrewsbury 31-yard field goal (Drive: 7 plays, 66 yards, 2:30; Chattanooga 21–14)

Statistics	UTC	VMI
First downs	19	16
Total yards	346	263
Rushing yards	223	45
Passing yards	123	218
Passing: Comp–Att–Int	14–23–1	18–37–1
Time of possession	31:15	28:45

Team	Category	Player	Statistics
Chattanooga	Passing	Camden Orth	14/23, 123 yards, TD, INT
Chattanooga	Rushing	Justus Durant	20 carries, 144 yards
Chattanooga	Receiving	Jamarii Robinson	4 receptions, 50 yards
VMI	Passing	Collin Shannon	17/36, 177 yards, INT
VMI	Rushing	Luke Schalow	5 carries, 16 yards
VMI	Receiving	Noah Grevious	11 receptions, 123 yards

=== East Tennessee State ===
East Tennessee State Buccaneers (3-4) vs. Chattanooga Mocs (2-4) – Game summary

Quarter	1	2	3	4	Total
Buccaneers	10	0	7	21	38
Mocs	7	7	7	21	42

at Finley Stadium • Chattanooga, TN

- Date: October 18
- Game time: 12:30 PM CDT
- Game weather: Cloudy • Temperature: 80 °F (27 °C) • Wind: S at 6 miles per hour (9.7 km/h)
- Game attendance: 9,307
- Referee: Jake Grombach
- TV announcers (ESPN+): Chris Goforth (play-by-play), Scott McMahon (analyst) and Mackenzie Johnson (sideline)

Game information

First Quarter

- (8:53) ETSU – Ewan Johnson 20-yard field goal (Drive: 14 plays, 72 yards, 6:07; East Tennessee State 3–0)
- (5:49) UTC – Ryan Ingram 23-yard run, Jude Kelley kick (Drive: 6 plays, 75 yards, 3:04; Chattanooga 7–3)
- (1:56) ETSU – Cade McNamara 25-yard run, Ewan Johnson kick (Drive: 12 plays, 70 yards, 3:51; East Tennessee State 10–7)

Second Quarter

- (13:45) UTC – Markell Quick 21-yard pass from Camden Orth, Jude Kelley kick (Drive: 8 plays, 75 yards, 3:11; Chattanooga 14–10)

Third Quarter

- (9:04) UTC – Jude Kelley 8-yard run, Jude Kelley kick (Drive: 10 plays, 78 yards, 5:51; Chattanooga 21–10)
- (6:38) ETSU – Jason Albritton 60-yard run, Ewan Johnson kick (Drive: 5 plays, 83 yards, 2:16; Chattanooga 21–17)

Fourth Quarter

- (14:00) ETSU – Jason Albritton 1-yard run, Ewan Johnson kick (Drive: 8 plays, 62 yards, 2:35; East Tennessee State 24–21)
- (12:04) ETSU – Jeremiah Harrison 23-yard pass from Cade McNamara, Ewan Johnson kick (Drive: 3 plays, 75 yards, 1:03; East Tennessee State 31–21)
- (10:17) ETSU – Devontae Houston 49-yard run, Ewan Johnson kick (Drive: 2 plays, 54 yards, 0:30; East Tennessee State 38–21)
- (7:20) UTC – Josh Williams 22-yard pass from Camden Orth, Jude Kelley kick (Drive: 6 plays, 85 yards, 2:51; East Tennessee State 38–28)
- (2:29) UTC – Jamarii Robinson 20-yard pass from Camden Orth, Jude Kelley kick (Drive: 6 plays, 80 yards, 2:21; East Tennessee State 38–35)
- (0:11) UTC – Jamarii Robinson 4-yard pass from Camden Orth, Jude Kelley kick (Drive: 11 plays, 67 yards, 1:44; Chattanooga 42–38)

Statistics	ETSU	UTC
First downs	25	26
Total yards	517	519
Rushing yards	321	176
Passing yards	196	343
Passing: Comp–Att–Int	19–6–0	20–34–0
Time of possession	29:00	31:00

Team	Category	Player	Statistics
East Tennessee State	Passing	Cade McNamara	19/26, 196 yards, TD
East Tennessee State	Rushing	Devontae Houston	23 carries, 171 yards, TD
East Tennessee State	Receiving	Jeremiah Harrison	4 receptions, 76 yards, TD
Chattanooga	Passing	Camden Orth	220/32, 343 yards, 4 TDs
Chattanooga	Rushing	Justus Durant	21 carries, 95 yards
Chattanooga	Receiving	Markell Quick	6 receptions, 15 yards, TD

=== at Samford ===
Chattanooga Mocs (3-4) vs. Samford Bulldogs (1-6) – Game summary

Quarter	1	2	3	4	Total
Mocs	7	7	14	21	49
Bulldogs	7	0	0	6	13

at Pete Hanna Stadium • Homewood, AL

- Date: October 25
- Game time: 2:30 PM CDT
- Game weather: Sunny • Temperature: 75 °F (24 °C) • Wind: NW at 9 miles per hour (14 km/h)
- Game attendance: 3,741
- Referee: Bruce Austin
- TV announcers (ESPN+): Blake Gardner (play-by-play), Damian Mitchell (analyst) and Christina Chambers (sideline)

Game information

First Quarter

- (8:20) SAM – Brady Stober 1-yard run, Jake Garner kick (Drive: 7 plays, 47 yards, 1:55; Samford 7–0)
- (2:22) UTC – Camden Orth 6-yard run, Jude Kelley kick (Drive: 6 plays, 61 yards, 3:13; Tied 7–7)

Second Quarter

- (10:58) UTC – A.J. Little 47-yard punt return, Jude Kelley kick (Chattanooga 14–7)

Third Quarter

- (7:17) UTC – John McIntyre 4-yard pass from Camden Orth, Jude Kelley kick (Drive: 7 plays, 92 yards, 4:01; Chattanooga 21–7)
- (1:15) UTC – A.J. Little 15-yard pass from Camden Orth, Jude Kelley kick (Drive: 6 plays, 52 yards, 2:32; Chattanooga 28–7)

Fourth Quarter

- (14:47) UTC – Jamarii Robinson 42-yard pass from Camden Orth, Jude Kelley kick (Drive: 3 plays, 55 yards, 0:59; Chattanooga 35–7)
- (7:18) SAM – Ken Cherry 2-yard run (Drive: 10 plays, 53 yards, 3:23; Chattanooga 35–13)
- (4:35) UTC – Solomon Locke 35-yard run, Jude Kelley kick (Drive: 5 plays, 43 yards, 2:42; Chattanooga 42–13)
- (1:07) UTC – Solomon Locke 31-yard run, Jude Kelley kick (Drive: 4 plays, 80 yards, 1:57; Chattanooga 49–13)

Statistics	UTC	SAM
First downs	18	19
Total yards	429	342
Rushing yards	257	94
Passing yards	172	248
Passing: Comp–Att–Int	11–20–0	22–44–2
Time of possession	32:19	27:41

Team	Category	Player	Statistics
Chattanooga	Passing	Camden Orth	11/20, 172 yards, 3 TD
Chattanooga	Rushing	Solomon Locke	5 carries, 115 yards, 2 TD
Chattanooga	Receiving	A.J. Little	4 receptions, 93 yards, TD
Samford	Passing	Charlie Gilliam	9/15, 138 yards, INT
Samford	Rushing	Emerson Russell	3 carries, 38 yards
Samford	Receiving	Jaden Gibson	5 receptions, 77 yards

=== Western Carolina ===
Western Carolina Catamounts (5-3) vs. Chattanooga Mocs (4-4) – Game summary

Quarter	1	2	3	4	Total
Catamounts	7	14	7	7	35
Mocs	0	7	14	7	28

at Finley Stadium • Chattanooga, TN

- Date: November 1
- Game time: 4:00 PM EDT
- Game weather: Sunny • Temperature: 62 °F (17 °C) • Wind: E at 5 miles per hour (8.0 km/h)
- Game attendance: 7,711
- Referee: Michael Farmer
- TV announcers (ESPN+): Chris Goforth (play-by-play), Chris Barnett (analyst) and Makenzie Johnson (sideline)

Game information

First Quarter

- (12:38) WCU – James Tyre 4-yard pass from Taron Dickens, Marcus Trout kick (Drive: 8 plays, 26 yards, 2:11; Western Carolina 7–0)

Second Quarter

- (8:38) WCU – James Tyre 7-yard pass from Taron Dickens, Marcus Trout kick (Drive: 9 plays, 45 yards, 3:39; Western Carolina 14–0)
- (5:25) UTC – Ryan Ingram 1-yard run, Gray Kelley kick (Drive: 8 plays, 70 yards, 3:08; Western Carolina 14–7)
- (2:49) WCU – James Tyre 13-yard pass from Taron Dickens, Marcus Trout kick (Drive: 8 plays, 54 yards, 2:29; Western Carolina 21–7)

Third Quarter

- (9:21) UTC – Nathaniel Eberly-Rodriguez 4-yard pass from Camden Orth, Gray Kelley kick (Drive: 11 plays, 75 yards, 5:39; Western Carolina 21–14)
- (2:18) UTC – Camden Orth 4-yard run, Gray Kelley kick (Drive: 7 plays, 50 yards, 3:14; Tied 21–21)
- (0:20) WCU – Markel Townsend 2-yard run, Marcus Trout kick (Drive: 5 plays, 70 yards, 1:53; Western Carolina 28–21)

Fourth Quarter

- (9:26) WCU – Michael Rossin 10-yard pass from Taron Dickens, Marcus Trout kick (Drive: 8 plays, 66 yards, 2:56; Western Carolina 35–21)
- (7:40) UTC – Justus Durant 8-yard run, Gray Kelley kick (Drive: 3 plays, 75 yards, 1:46; Western Carolina 35–28)

Statistics	WCU	UTC
First downs	22	25
Total yards	356	399
Rushing yards	131	158
Passing yards	225	241
Passing: Comp–Att–Int	18–29–0	15–27–2
Time of possession	22:40	37:20

Team	Category	Player	Statistics
Western Carolina	Passing	Taron Dickens	18/29, 225 yards, 4 TD
Western Carolina	Rushing	Patrick Boyd Jr.	12 carries, 67 yards
Western Carolina	Receiving	James Tyre	5 receptions, 45 yards, 3 TD
Chattanooga	Passing	Camden Orth	15/27, 241 yards, TD, 2 INT
Chattanooga	Rushing	Ryan Ingram	15 carries, 60 yards, TD
Chattanooga	Receiving	Markell Quick	3 receptions, 126 yards

=== Furman ===
Furman Paladins (5-4) vs. Chattanooga Mocs (4-5) – Game summary

Quarter	1	2	3	4	Total
Paladins	7	14	7	0	28
Mocs	0	21	10	14	45

at Finley Stadium • Chattanooga, TN

- Date: November 8
- Game time: 1:30 PM EST

Statistics	FUR	UTC
First downs	17	24
Total yards	368	529
Rushing yards	296	252
Passing yards	72	277
Passing: Comp–Att–Int	19-27-2	15-230
Time of possession	21:34	38:26

Team	Category	Player	Statistics
Furman	Passing	Trey Hedden	19/27, 296 yards, 2 TD, 2 INT
Furman	Rushing	CJ Nettles	11 carries, 48 yards, 1 TD
Furman	Receiving	Evan James	5 receptions, 146 yards, 1 TD
Chattanooga	Passing	Battle Alberson	15/22, 277 yards, 4 TD
Chattanooga	Rushing	Ryan Ingram	22 carries, 94 yards
Chattanooga	Receiving	Josh Williams	6 receptions, 116 yards, 1 TD

=== at No. 8 Mercer ===
Chattanooga Mocs (5-5) vs. No. 8 Mercer Bears (8-1) – Game summary

Quarter	1	2	3	4	Total
Mocs	3	0	0	14	17
No. 8 Bears	21	14	21	7	63

at Five Star Stadium • Macon, GA

- Date: November 15
- Game time: 3:00 PM EST

Statistics	UTC	MER
First downs	12	32
Total yards	198	545
Rushing yards	138	333
Passing yards	60	212
Passing: Comp–Att–Int	11–25–2	29–38–1
Time of possession	29:55	30:05

Team	Category	Player	Statistics
Chattanooga	Passing	Battle Alberson	11/25, 138 yards, TD, 2 INT
Chattanooga	Rushing	Journey Wyche	11 carries, 44 yards
Chattanooga	Receiving	Markell Quick	3 receptions, 75 yards, TD
Mercer	Passing	Braden Atkinson	28/37, 326 yards, 5 TD, INT
Mercer	Rushing	CJ Miller	14 carries, 91 yards, 2 TD
Mercer	Receiving	Adonis McDaniel	6 receptions, 68 yards, TD

=== at Wofford ===
Chattanooga Mocs (0-0) vs. Wofford Terriers (0-0) – Game summary

Quarter	1	2	3	4	Total
Mocs	0	13	0	0	13
Terriers	7	14	7	7	35

at Gibbs Stadium • Spartanburg, SC

- Date: November 22

Statistics	UTC	WOF
First downs	23	13
Total yards	300	371
Rushing yards	85	127
Passing yards	215	244
Passing: Comp–Att–Int	21-32-1	22-28-0
Time of possession	34:06	25:54

Team	Category	Player	Statistics
Chattanooga	Passing	Battle Alberson	21/32, 215 yards, 1 INT
Chattanooga	Rushing	Journey Wyche	6 carries, 53 yards, 1 TD
Chattanooga	Receiving	Josh Williams	11 receptions, 118 yards, 0 TD
Wofford	Passing	J.T. Fayard	22/28, 244 yards, 3 TD
Wofford	Rushing	Gerald Modest	10 carries, 76 yards, 2 TD
Wofford	Receiving	Ivory Aikens	6 receptions, 91 yards, 1 TD
