= 2025 VMI Keydets football team =

American college football season

2025 VMI Keydets football
- Conference: Southern Conference
- Record: 1–11 (0–8 SoCon)
- Head coach: Danny Rocco (3rd season)
- Offensive coordinator: A. J. Hampton (1st season)
- Offensive scheme: Pro spread
- Defensive coordinator: Rich Yahner (3rd season)
- Base defense: 3–3–5
- Home stadium: Alumni Memorial Field

2025 Southern Conference football standings
	Conf.			Overall
Team	W		L	W		L
No. 17 Mercer $^	8	–	0	9	–	3
Western Carolina	6	–	2	7	–	5
East Tennessee State	5	–	3	7	–	5
Wofford	5	–	3	6	–	6
Chattanooga	4	–	4	5	–	7
Furman	4	–	4	6	–	6
The Citadel	3	–	5	4	–	8
Samford	1	–	7	1	–	11
VMI	0	–	8	1	–	11
$ – Conference champion; ^ – FCS playoff participant; Rankings from STATS Poll

The 2025 VMI Keydets football team represented the Virginia Military Institute as a member of the Southern Conference (SoCon) during the 2025 NCAA Division I FCS football season. The Keydets were led by third-year head coach Danny Rocco and played at the Alumni Memorial Field in Lexington, Virginia.

== Schedule ==
Date	Time	Opponent	Site	TV	Result	Attendance
August 30	12:00 p.m.	at Navy*	Navy–Marine Corps Memorial Stadium; Annapolis, MD	CBSSN	L 7–52	30,014
September 6	1:30 p.m.	Ferrum*	Alumni Memorial Field; Lexington, VA	ESPN+	W 42–7	4,924
September 13	3:30 p.m.	at Bucknell*	Christy Mathewson–Memorial Stadium; Lewisburg, PA	ESPN+	L 28–35	2,058
September 20	2:00 p.m.	at Richmond*	E. Claiborne Robins Stadium; Richmond, VA (rivalry)	ESPN+	L 14–38	7,244
October 4	1:30 p.m.	Chattanooga	Alumni Memorial Field; Lexington, VA	ESPN+	L 14–21	3,865
October 11	3:30 p.m.	at East Tennessee State	William B. Greene Jr. Stadium; Johnson City, TN	ESPN+	L 10–45	7,953
October 18	1:30 p.m.	Samford	Alumni Memorial Field; Lexington, VA	ESPN+	L 22–24	5,294
October 25	3:00 p.m.	at No. 17 Mercer	Five Star Stadium; Macon, GA	ESPN+	L 0–62	7,009
November 1	2:00 p.m.	at The Citadel	Johnson Hagood Stadium; Charleston, SC (Military Classic of the South)	ESPN+	L 24–35	11,127
November 8	1:30 p.m.	Wofford	Alumni Memorial Field; Lexington, VA	ESPN+	L 10–52	3,642
November 15	1:00 p.m.	at Furman	Paladin Stadium; Greenville, SC	ESPN+	L 14–32	8,527
November 22	12:00 p.m.	Western Carolina	Alumni Memorial Field; Lexington, VA	ESPN+	L 6–48	3,588
*Non-conference game; Rankings from STATS Poll released prior to the game; All times are in Eastern time

== Game summaries ==
=== at Navy (FBS) ===
VMI Keydets (0–0) at Navy Midshipmen (FBS) (0–0) – Game summary

Quarter	1	2	3	4	Total
Keydets	0	0	7	0	7
Midshipmen (FBS)	7	21	10	14	52

at Navy–Marine Corps Memorial Stadium • Annapolis, Maryland

- Date: August 30
- Game time: 12:00 PM EDT
- Game weather: Sunny • Temperature: 72 °F (22 °C) • Wind: S at 7 miles per hour (11 km/h)
- Game attendance: 30,014
- Referee: Matt Overton
- TV announcers (CBSSN): Chris Lewis (analyst), Randy Cross (play-by-play), and Brandon Baylor (sideline reporter)

Game information

First quarter

- NAVY – Michael Barrow 7-yard run (Nathan Kirkwood kick), 6:00. Midshipmen 7–0. Drive: 11 plays, 70 yards, 5:45.

Second quarter

- NAVY – Eli Heidenreich 18-yard pass from Blake Horvath (Nathan Kirkwood kick), 11:07. Midshipmen 14–0. Drive: 4 plays, 35 yards, 1:51.
- NAVY – Alex Tecza 6-yard run (Nathan Kirkwood kick), 5:17. Midshipmen 21–0. Drive: 6 plays, 43 yards, 2:31.
- NAVY – Eli Heidenreich 4-yard run (Nathan Kirkwood kick), 0:48. Midshipmen 28–0. Drive: 6 plays, 78 yards, 1:38.

Third quarter

- NAVY – Nathan Kirkwood 28-yard field goal, 7:22. Midshipmen 31–0. Drive: 15 plays, 66 yards, 7:33.
- VMI – Owen Sweeney 75-yard pass from Collin Shannon (Ben Shrewsbury kick), 7:13. Midshipmen 31–7. Drive: 1 play, 75 yards, 0:09.
- NAVY – Braxton Woodson 74-yard run (Nathan Kirkwood kick), 0:50. Midshipmen 38–7. Drive: 3 plays, 80 yards, 1:37.

Fourth quarter

- NAVY – Braxton Woodson 68-yard run (Nathan Kirkwood kick), 9:39. Midshipmen 45–7. Drive: 4 plays, 94 yards, 1:54.
- NAVY – Shane Reynolds 4-yard run (Nathan Kirkwood kick), 2:37. Midshipmen 52–7. Drive: 10 plays, 65 yards, 5:57.

Statistics	VMI	NAVY
First downs	9	26
Plays–yards	50–212	68–560
Rushes–yards	22–15	54–468
Passing yards	197	92
Passing: comp–att–int	16–28–0	9–14–0
Turnovers	0	0
Time of possession	24:33	35:27

Team	Category	Player	Statistics
VMI	Passing	Collin Shannon	16/25, 197 yards, TD
VMI	Rushing	Leo Boehling	8 carries, 21 yards
VMI	Receiving	Owen Sweeney	5 receptions, 126 yards, TD
Navy	Passing	Blake Horvath	6/7, 66 yards, TD
Navy	Rushing	Braxton Woodson	7 carries, 180 yards, 2 TD
Navy	Receiving	Eli Heidenreich	6 receptions, 65 yards, TD

=== Ferrum (DII) ===
Ferrum Panthers (DII) (0-1) vs. VMI Keydets (0-1) – Game summary

Quarter	1	2	3	4	Total
Panthers (DII)	0	7	0	0	7
Keydets	14	7	21	0	42

at Alumni Memorial Field • Lexington, VA

- Date: September 6
- Game time: 1:30 p.m. EDT
- Game weather: Sunny
- Game attendance: 4,924
- Referee: Brian Hilpisch
- TV: ESPN+

Game information

First Quarter

- (9:07) VMI – Noah Grevious 78-yard run, Ben Shrewsbury kick (Drive: 3 plays, 78 yards, 0:27; VMI 7–0)
- (7:02) VMI – Morgan McPhaul 5-yard pass from Collin Shannon, Ben Shrewsbury kick (Drive: 2 plays, 4 yards, 0:33; VMI 14–0)

Second Quarter

- (7:25) VMI – Aslin Shipe 1-yard run, Ben Shrewsbury kick (Drive: 10 plays, 80 yards, 4:27; VMI 21–0)
- (1:56) FER – Eli Foutz 4-yard run, Jon Davis kick (Drive: 4 plays, 22 yards, 1:33; VMI 21–7)

Third Quarter

- (13:23) VMI – Owen Sweeney 52-yard pass from Collin Shannon, Ben Shrewsbury kick (Drive: 1 play, 52 yards, 0:08; VMI 28–7)
- (10:56) VMI – Anthony Allen 10-yard fumble recovery, Ben Shrewsbury kick (VMI 35–7)
- (4:57) VMI – Malik McNeely 31-yard pass from Collin Shannon, Ben Shrewsbury kick (Drive: 6 plays, 60 yards, 2:24; VMI 42–7)

Fourth Quarter

No scoring plays

Statistics	FER	VMI
First downs	12	19
Total yards	188	405
Rushing yards	94	179
Passing yards	94	226
Passing: Comp–Att–Int	13–21–0	16–32–1
Time of possession	34:07	25:53

Team	Category	Player	Statistics
Ferrum	Passing	Eli Foutz	9/15, 64 yards
Ferrum	Rushing	Aiden Vaught	16 carries, 42 yards
Ferrum	Receiving	Omarza Gray	3 receptions, 32 yards
VMI	Passing	Collin Shannon	15/27, 225 yards, 3 TD, INT
VMI	Rushing	Noah Grevious	1 carry, 78 yards, TD
VMI	Receiving	Malik McNeely	4 receptions, 81 yards, TD

=== at Bucknell ===
VMI Keydets (1-1) vs. Bucknell Bison (1-1) – Game summary

Quarter	1	2	3	4	Total
Keydets	7	0	7	14	28
Bison	7	14	7	7	35

at Christy Mathewson–Memorial Stadium • Lewisburg, PA

- Date: September 13
- Game time: 3:30 p.m. EDT
- Game weather: Sunny
- Game attendance: 2,058
- Referee: Eric Lewis
- TV announcers (ESPN+): Doug Birdsong (play-by-play) and Charlie Fisher (analyst)

Game information

First Quarter

- (8:46) BUC – Sam Milligan 45-yard pass from Ralph Rucker IV, Matt Schearer kick (Drive: 1 play, 45 yards, 0:08; Bucknell 7–0)
- (3:16) VMI – Owen Sweeney 18-yard pass from Collin Shannon, Ben Shrewsbury kick (Drive: 12 plays, 69 yards, 5:23; Tied 7–7)

Second Quarter

- (4:58) BUC – Sam Milligan 18-yard pass from Ralph Rucker IV, Matt Schearer kick (Drive: 15 plays, 94 yards, 8:03; Bucknell 14–7)
- (0:15) BUC – Sam Milligan 34-yard pass from Ralph Rucker IV, Matt Schearer kick (Drive: 10 plays, 85 yards, 2:54; Bucknell 21–7)

Third Quarter

- (8:37) VMI – Noah Grevious 73-yard pass from Collin Shannon, Ben Shrewsbury kick (Drive: 3 plays, 77 yards, 1:29; Bucknell 21–14)
- (2:30) BUC – TJ Cadden 59-yard pass from Ralph Rucker IV, Matt Schearer kick (Drive: 3 plays, 63 yards, 1:13; Bucknell 28–14)

Fourth Quarter

- (14:54) VMI – Nana Utsey 3-yard run, Ben Shrewsbury kick (Drive: 6 plays, 70 yards, 2:29; Bucknell 28–21)
- (5:26) VMI – Owen Sweeney 14-yard pass from Collin Shannon, Ben Shrewsbury kick (Drive: 7 plays, 67 yards, 3:30; Tied 28–28)
- (1:49) BUC – Sam Milligan 37-yard pass from Ralph Rucker IV, Matt Schearer kick (Drive: 8 plays, 88 yards, 3:37; Bucknell 35–28)

Statistics	VMI	BUCK
First downs	18	18
Total yards	421	476
Rushing yards	59	71
Passing yards	362	405
Passing: Comp–Att–Int	21–38–0	21–28–1
Time of possession	30:28	29:32

Team	Category	Player	Statistics
VMI	Passing	Collin Shannon	21/38, 362 yards, 3 TD
VMI	Rushing	Leo Boehling	19 carries, 66 yards
VMI	Receiving	Noah Grevious	6 receptions, 186 yards, TD
Bucknell	Passing	Ralph Rucker IV	21/28, 405 yards, 5 TD, INT
Bucknell	Rushing	Tariq Thomas	14 carries, 25 yards
Bucknell	Receiving	Sam Milligan	7 receptions, 192 yards, 4 TD

=== at Richmond (rivalry) ===
VMI Keydets (1–2) vs. Richmond Spiders (1–2) – Game summary

Quarter	1	2	3	4	Total
Keydets	7	7	0	0	14
Spiders	14	10	7	7	38

at E. Claiborne Robins Stadium • Richmond, VA

- Date: September 20
- Game time: 2:00 p.m. EDT
- Game weather: Sunny • Temperature: 87 °F (31 °C) • Wind: NE at 3 miles per hour (4.8 km/h)
- Game attendance: 7,244
- Referee: Jeremy DeAngulo
- TV announcers (ESPN+/MSN): Bob Black (play-by-play), Chris Anderson (analyst) and Chip Tarkenton (sideline)

Game information

First Quarter

- (10:17) RICH - Aziz Foster-Powell 2-yard run, Jayden Alsheskie kick (Drive: 10 Plays, 75 yards, 4:43; RICH 7–0)
- (10:04) VMI - Collin Shannon 75-yard pass to Owen Sweeney, Ben Shrewsbury kick (Drive: 1 Play, 75 yards, 0:13; TIED 7–7)
- (9:18) RICH - Kyle Wickersham 67-yard pass to Isaiah Dawson, Jayden Alsheskie kick (Drive: 2 Plays, 75 yards, 0:46; RICH 14–7)

Second Quarter

- (6:51) VMI - Collin Shannon 20-yard pass to Owen Sweeney, Ben Shrewsbury kick (Drive: 14 Plays, 80 yards, 6:36; TIED 14–14)
- (3:50) RICH - Kyle Wickersham 13-yard pass to Isaiah Dawson, Jayden Alsheskie kick (Drive: 8 Plays, 75 yards, 3:01; RICH 21–14)
- (1:35) RICH - Jayden Alsheskie 41-yard field goal (Drive: 5 Plays, 14 yards, 0:48; RICH 24–14)

Third Quarter

- (6:17) RICH - Andrew King 83-yard run, Jayden Alsheskie kick (Drive: 4 Plays, 93 yards, 2:35; RICH 31–14)

Fourth Quarter

- (13:51) RICH - Kyle Wickersham 8-yard run, Jayden Alsheskie kick (Drive: 6 Plays, 52 yards, 3:01; RICH 38–14)

Statistics	VMI	RICH
First downs	13	22
Total yards	229	541
Rushing yards	34	353
Passing yards	195	188
Passing: Comp–Att–Int	17–35–1	11–14–0
Time of possession	26:28	33:32

Team	Category	Player	Statistics
VMI	Passing	Collin Shannon	16/34, 198 yards, 2 TD
VMI	Rushing	Leo Boehling	10 carries, 37 yards
VMI	Receiving	Owen Sweeney	4 receptions, 106 yards, 2 TD
Richmond	Passing	Kyle Wickersham	10/13, 166 yards, 2 TD
Richmond	Rushing	Jamaal Brown	14 carries, 153 yards
Richmond	Receiving	Isaiah Dawson	4 receptions, 99 yards, 2 TD

=== Chattanooga ===
Chattanooga Mocs (1-4) vs. VMI Keydets (1-3) – Game summary

Quarter	1	2	3	4	Total
Mocs	0	14	7	0	21
Keydets	0	3	8	3	14

at Alumni Memorial Field • Lexington, VA

- Date: October 4
- Game time: 1:30 PM EDT
- Game weather: Sunny • Temperature: 73 °F (23 °C)
- Game attendance: 3,865
- Referee: Jason Graham
- TV announcers (ESPN+): Wade Branner (play-by-play) and Phil Marcello (analyst)

Game information

First Quarter

No scoring plays

Second Quarter

- (14:54) UTC – Josh Williams 6-yard pass from Camden Orth, Jude Kelley kick (Drive: 9 plays, 72 yards, 5:59; Chattanooga 7–0)
- (8:13) VMI – Ben Shrewsbury 37-yard field goal (Drive: 15 plays, 59 yards, 6:41; Chattanooga 7–3)
- (0:23) UTC – Ryan Ingram 8-yard run, Jude Kelley kick (Drive: 9 plays, 99 yards, 2:50; Chattanooga 14–3)

Third Quarter

- (6:14) VMI – Anthony Allen 75-yard interception, Leo Boehling pass (Chattanooga 14–11)
- (2:10) UTC – Ryan Ingram 10-yard run, Jude Kelley kick (Drive: 8 plays, 65 yards, 4:04; Chattanooga 21–11)

Fourth Quarter

- (6:30) VMI – Ben Shrewsbury 31-yard field goal (Drive: 7 plays, 66 yards, 2:30; Chattanooga 21–14)

Statistics	UTC	VMI
First downs	19	16
Total yards	346	263
Rushing yards	223	45
Passing yards	123	218
Passing: Comp–Att–Int	14–23–1	18–37–1
Time of possession	31:15	28:45

Team	Category	Player	Statistics
Chattanooga	Passing	Camden Orth	14/23, 123 yards, TD, INT
Chattanooga	Rushing	Justus Durant	20 carries, 144 yards
Chattanooga	Receiving	Jamarii Robinson	4 receptions, 50 yards
VMI	Passing	Collin Shannon	17/36, 177 yards, INT
VMI	Rushing	Luke Schalow	5 carries, 16 yards
VMI	Receiving	Noah Grevious	11 receptions, 123 yards

=== at East Tennessee State ===
VMI Keydets (1-4) vs. East Tennessee State Buccaneers (2-4) – Game summary

Quarter	1	2	3	4	Total
Keydets	0	0	7	3	10
Buccaneers	7	17	14	7	45

at William B. Greene Jr. Stadium • Johnson City, TN

- Date: October 11
- Game time: 3:30 p.m. EDT
- Game weather: Sunny • Temperature: 71 °F (22 °C) • Wind: NE at 6 miles per hour (9.7 km/h)
- Game attendance: 7,953
- Referee: Bruce Austin
- TV announcers (ESPN+): Keith Brake (play-by-play), Mark Hutsell (analyst) and Kennedy Story (sideline)

Game information

First Quarter

- (13:23) ETSU – Xavier Gaillardetz 80-yard punt return, Ewan Johnson kick (East Tennessee State 7–0)

Second Quarter

- (14:54) ETSU – Devontae Houston 10-yard run, Ewan Johnson kick (Drive: 3 plays, 22 yards, 0:54; East Tennessee State 14–0)
- (4:16) ETSU – Ewan Johnson 33-yard field goal (Drive: 4 plays, 2 yards, 1:29; East Tennessee State 17–0)
- (1:20) ETSU – Jeremiah Harrison 17-yard pass from Jake McNamara, Ewan Johnson kick (Drive: 3 plays, 40 yards, 0:49; East Tennessee State 24–0)

Third Quarter

- (13:16) ETSU – Ephraim Floyd 12-yard pass from Jake McNamara, Ewan Johnson kick (Drive: 5 plays, 75 yards, 1:44; East Tennessee State 31–0)
- (11:20) VMI – Robert Powell 10-yard interception, Ben Shrewsbury kick (East Tennessee State 31–7)
- (9:23) ETSU – Jason Albritton 1-yard run, Ewan Johnson kick (Drive: 6 plays, 75 yards, 1:57; East Tennessee State 38–7)

Fourth Quarter

- (5:35) VMI – Ben Shrewsbury 52-yard field goal (Drive: 5 plays, 12 yards, 2:00; East Tennessee State 38–10)
- (0:58) ETSU – Jackson Byrd 20-yard run, Ewan Johnson kick (Drive: 8 plays, 79 yards, 4:21; East Tennessee State 45–10)

Statistics	VMI	ETSU
First downs	5	24
Total yards	82	509
Rushing yards	13	284
Passing yards	69	225
Passing: Comp–Att–Int	11–30–1	16–26–1
Time of possession	28:47	31:13

Team	Category	Player	Statistics
VMI	Passing	Collin Shannon	7/16, 41 yards, INT
VMI	Rushing	Luke Schalow	10 carries, 32 yards
VMI	Receiving	Traveion Slaughter	2 receptions, 22 yards
East Tennessee State	Passing	Jake McNamara	8/14, 176 yards, 2 TD, INT
East Tennessee State	Rushing	Devontae Houston	12 carries, 76 yards, TD
East Tennessee State	Receiving	Jeremiah Harrison	5 receptions, 71 yards, TD

=== Samford ===
Samford Bulldogs (0-6) vs. VMI Keydets (1-5) – Game summary

Quarter	1	2	3	4	Total
Bulldogs	7	14	0	3	24
Keydets	0	7	6	9	22

at Alumni Memorial Field • Lexington, VA

- Date: October 18
- Game time: 12:30 PM EDT
- Game weather: Sunny
- Game attendance: 5,294
- Referee: Brian Hilpisch
- TV announcers (ESPN+): Wade Branner (play-by-play) and Chip Tarkenton (analyst)

Game information

First Quarter

- (11:23) SAM – Calvin Jones 15-yard pass from Brady Stober, Jake Garner kick (Drive: 10 plays, 73 yards, 3:37; Samford 7–0)

Second Quarter

- (14:50) VMI – Owen Sweeney 55-yard pass from Collin Shannon, Ben Shrewsbury kick (Drive: 3 plays, 80 yards, 1:18; Tied 7–7)
- (11:50) SAM – Samuel Pickett III 22-yard pass from Brady Stober, Jake Garner kick (Drive: 6 plays, 75 yards, 3:00; Samford 14–7)
- (0:50) SAM – Preston Bird 27-yard pass from Brady Stober, Jake Garner kick (Drive: 4 plays, 64 yards, 0:52; Samford 21–7)

Third Quarter

- (12:20) VMI – Leo Boehling 37-yard run (Drive: 7 plays, 78 yards, 2:40; Samford 21–13)

Fourth Quarter

- (13:36) VMI – Ben Shrewsbury 24-yard field goal (Drive: 12 plays, 73 yards, 3:54; Samford 21–16)
- (7:24) VMI – Noah Grevious 10-yard pass from Collin Shannon (Drive: 4 plays, 88 yards, 2:15; VMI 22–21)
- (1:28) SAM – Jake Garner 37-yard field goal (Drive: 14 plays, 67 yards, 3:43; Samford 24–22)

Statistics	SAM	VMI
First downs	22	25
Total yards	398	522
Rushing yards	113	103
Passing yards	285	419
Passing: Comp–Att–Int	34–43–1	24–38–1
Time of possession	29:14	30:46

Team	Category	Player	Statistics
Samford	Passing	Brady Stober	34/43, 285 yards, 3 TD, INT
Samford	Rushing	Brady Stober	13 carries, 45 yards
Samford	Receiving	Preston Bird	9 receptions, 116 yards, TD
VMI	Passing	Collin Shannon	24/38, 419 yards, 2 TD, INT
VMI	Rushing	Aslin Shipe	10 carries, 66 yards
VMI	Receiving	Owen Sweeney	13 receptions, 208 yards, TD

=== at No. 17 Mercer ===
VMI Keydets (1-6) vs. No. 17 Mercer Bears (5-1) – Game summary

Quarter	1	2	3	4	Total
Keydets	0	0	0	0	0
No. 17 Bears	31	10	7	14	62

at Five Star Stadium • Macon, GA

- Date: October 25
- Game time: 3:00 p.m. EDT
- Game weather: Sunny • Temperature: 76 °F (24 °C) • Wind: E at 8 miles per hour (13 km/h)
- Game attendance: 7,009
- Referee: Michael Farmer
- TV announcers (ESPN+): Frank Malloy (play-by-play) and Phil Cox (analyst)

Game information

First Quarter

- (14:50) MER – Brayden Smith 2-yard pass from Braden Atkinson, Reice Griffith kick (Drive: 1 play, 75 yards, 0:10; Mercer 7–0)
- (10:28) MER – Brayden Smith 32-yard pass from Braden Atkinson, Reice Griffith kick (Drive: 5 plays, 80 yards, 1:57; Mercer 14–0)
- (7:46) MER – CJ Miller 59-yard pass from Braden Atkinson, Reice Griffith kick (Drive: 5 plays, 80 yards, 1:54; Mercer 21–0)
- (2:56) MER – Reice Griffith 25-yard field goal (Drive: 8 plays, 60 yards, 3:39; Mercer 24–0)
- (1:39) MER – CJ Miller 75-yard run, Reice Griffith kick (Drive: 1 play, 75 yards, 0:13; Mercer 31–0)

Second Quarter

- (4:22) MER – Adjatay Dabbs 84-yard pass from Braden Atkinson, Reice Griffith kick (Drive: 2 plays, 86 yards, 0:43; Mercer 38–0)
- (0:00) MER – Reice Griffith 50-yard field goal (Drive: 6 plays, 46 yards, 0:54; Mercer 41–0)

Third Quarter

- (0:53) MER – Adonis McDaniel 51-yard pass from Braden Atkinson, Reice Griffith kick (Drive: 4 plays, 76 yards, 1:45; Mercer 48–0)

Fourth Quarter

- (8:16) MER – Ty Doughty 15-yard run, Reice Griffith kick (Drive: 10 plays, 94 yards, 5:50; Mercer 55–0)
- (3:52) MER – Carlos Benjamin 58-yard run, Reice Griffith kick (Drive: 5 plays, 73 yards, 3:01; Mercer 62–0)

Statistics	VMI	MER
First downs	7	30
Total yards	155	829
Rushing yards	50	248
Passing yards	105	581
Passing: Comp–Att–Int	11–29–0	33–39–0
Time of possession	25:47	34:13

Team	Category	Player	Statistics
VMI	Passing	Collin Shannon	10/25, 104 yards
VMI	Rushing	Aslin Shipe	8 carries, 57 yards
VMI	Receiving	Owen Sweeney	3 receptions, 56 yards
Mercer	Passing	Braden Atkinson	29/35, 533 yards, 5 TD
Mercer	Rushing	CJ Miller	9 carries, 102 yards, TD
Mercer	Receiving	Brayden Smith	9 receptions, 150 yards, 2 TD

=== at The Citadel (Military Classic of the South) ===
VMI Keydets (1-7) vs. The Citadel Bulldogs (3-5) – Game summary

Quarter	1	2	3	4	Total
Keydets	7	7	7	3	24
Bulldogs	0	0	7	28	35

at Johnson Hagood Stadium • Charleston, SC

- Date: November 1
- Game time: 2:00 PM EDT
- Game weather: Sunny
- Game attendance: 11,127
- Referee: Jeff Page
- TV announcers (ESPN+): Dave Weinstein (play-by-play), Vad Lee (analyst) and Matison Little (sideline)

Game information

First Quarter

- (0:55) VMI – Nana Utsey 1-yard run, Jack Joyce kick (Drive: 9 plays, 66 yards, 4:44; VMI 7–0)

Second Quarter

- (0:10) VMI – Malik McNeely 9-yard pass from Collin Shannon, Jack Joyce kick (Drive: 15 plays, 98 yards, 6:16; VMI 14–0)

Third Quarter

- (11:14) VMI – Noah Grevious 59-yard pass from Collin Shannon, Jack Joyce kick (Drive: 4 plays, 71 yards, 1:51; VMI 21–0)
- (6:50) CIT – Jihad Marks 19-yard pass from Quentin Hayes, Ben Barnes kick (Drive: 11 plays, 75 yards, 4:24; VMI 21–7)

Fourth Quarter

- (14:58) VMI – Ben Shrewsbury 26-yard field goal (Drive: 10 plays, 88 yards, 4:20; VMI 24–7)
- (12:28) CIT – Quentin Hayes 6-yard run, Ben Barnes kick (Drive: 8 plays, 78 yards, 2:27; VMI 24–14)
- (10:36) CIT – Jihad Marks 72-yard pass from Quentin Hayes, Ben Barnes kick (Drive: 2 plays, 88 yards, 0:26; VMI 24–21)
- (4:33) CIT – Garrison Johnson Sr. 11-yard run, Ben Barnes kick (Drive: 9 plays, 76 yards, 3:28; The Citadel 28–24)
- (0:12) CIT – Jihad Marks 33-yard pass from Quentin Hayes, Ben Barnes kick (Drive: 4 plays, 42 yards, 1:00; The Citadel 35–24)

Statistics	VMI	CIT
First downs	19	24
Total yards	463	511
Rushing yards	202	329
Passing yards	261	182
Passing: Comp–Att–Int	21–29–0	7–10–0
Time of possession	30:34	29:26

Team	Category	Player	Statistics
VMI	Passing	Collin Shannon	21/29, 261 yards, 2 TD
VMI	Rushing	Leo Boehling	14 carries, 149 yards
VMI	Receiving	Noah Grevious	11 receptions, 138 yards, TD
The Citadel	Passing	Quentin Hayes	5/7, 175 yards, 3 TD
The Citadel	Rushing	Cobey Thompkins	11 carries, 101 yards
The Citadel	Receiving	Jihad Marks	4 receptions, 168 yards, 3 TD

=== Wofford ===
Wofford Terriers (3-6) vs. VMI Keydets (1-8) – Game summary

Quarter	1	2	3	4	Total
Terriers	-	-	-	-	0
Keydets	-	-	-	-	0

at Alumni Memorial Field • Lexington, VA

- Date: November 8
- Game time: 1:30 p.m. EDT
- TV: ESPN+

Statistics	WOF	VMI
First downs		
Total yards		
Rushing yards		
Passing yards		
Passing: Comp–Att–Int		
Time of possession		

Team	Category	Player	Statistics
Wofford	Passing		
Wofford	Rushing		
Wofford	Receiving		
VMI	Passing		
VMI	Rushing		
VMI	Receiving		

=== at Furman ===
VMI Keydets (0-0) vs. Furman Paladins (0-0) – Game summary

Quarter	1	2	3	4	Total
Keydets	-	-	-	-	0
Paladins	-	-	-	-	0

at Paladin Stadium • Greenville, SC

- Date: November 15

Statistics	VMI	FUR
First downs		
Total yards		
Rushing yards		
Passing yards		
Passing: Comp–Att–Int		
Time of possession		

Team	Category	Player	Statistics
VMI	Passing		
VMI	Rushing		
VMI	Receiving		
Furman	Passing		
Furman	Rushing		
Furman	Receiving		

=== Western Carolina ===
Western Carolina Catamounts (0-0) vs. VMI Keydets (0-0) – Game summary

Quarter	1	2	3	4	Total
Catamounts	-	-	-	-	0
Keydets	-	-	-	-	0

at Alumni Memorial Field • Lexington, VA

- Date: November 22

Statistics	WCU	VMI
First downs		
Total yards		
Rushing yards		
Passing yards		
Passing: Comp–Att–Int		
Time of possession		

Team	Category	Player	Statistics
Western Carolina	Passing		
Western Carolina	Rushing		
Western Carolina	Receiving		
VMI	Passing		
VMI	Rushing		
VMI	Receiving		
