= 2025 Wofford Terriers football team =

American college football season

2025 Wofford Terriers football
- Conference: Southern Conference
- Record: 6–6 (5–3 SoCon)
- Head coach: Shawn Watson (3rd season)
- Co-defensive coordinators: Jonathan Saxon (3rd season); Mitch Doolittle (1st season)
- Home stadium: Gibbs Stadium

2025 Southern Conference football standings
	Conf.			Overall
Team	W		L	W		L
No. 17 Mercer $^	8	–	0	9	–	3
Western Carolina	6	–	2	7	–	5
East Tennessee State	5	–	3	7	–	5
Wofford	5	–	3	6	–	6
Chattanooga	4	–	4	5	–	7
Furman	4	–	4	6	–	6
The Citadel	3	–	5	4	–	8
Samford	1	–	7	1	–	11
VMI	0	–	8	1	–	11
$ – Conference champion; ^ – FCS playoff participant; Rankings from STATS Poll

The 2025 Wofford Terriers football team represented Wofford College as a member of the Southern Conference (SoCon) during the 2025 NCAA Division I FCS football season. The Terriers were led by third-year head coach Shawn Watson and played at the Gibbs Stadium in Spartanburg, South Carolina.

== Schedule ==
Date	Time	Opponent	Site	TV	Result	Attendance
August 30	6:00 p.m.	at South Carolina State*	Oliver C. Dawson Stadium; Orangeburg, SC	ESPN+	L 15–16	6,208
September 6	6:00 p.m.	Richmond*	Gibbs Stadium; Spartanburg, SC	ESPN+	L 10–14	2,754
September 13	6:00 p.m.	at Mercer	Five Star Stadium; Macon, GA	ESPN+	L 21–22	7,404
September 20	12:00 p.m.	at Virginia Tech*	Lane Stadium; Blacksburg, VA	ACCNX/ESPN+	L 6–38	57,229
October 4	1:30 p.m.	Western Carolina	Gibbs Stadium; Spartanburg, SC	ESPN+	L 21–23	3,571
October 11	1:30 p.m.	Norfolk State*^{†}	Gibbs Stadium; Spartanburg, SC	ESPN+	W 31–14	4,844
October 18	12:00 p.m.	Furman	Gibbs Stadium; Spartanburg, SC (rivalry)	ESPN+/WYCW	W 31–13	3,086
October 25	3:30 p.m.	at East Tennessee State	William B. Greene Jr. Stadium; Johnson City, TN	ESPN+	L 10–14	9,836
November 1	1:30 p.m.	Samford	Gibbs Stadium; Spartanburg, SC	ESPN+	W 26–16	4,985
November 8	1:30 p.m.	at VMI	Alumni Memorial Field; Lexington, VA	ESPN+	W 52–10	3,642
November 15	2:00 p.m.	at The Citadel	Johnson Hagood Stadium; Charleston, SC (rivalry)	ESPN+	W 16–14	12,909
November 22	1:30 p.m.	Chattanooga	Gibbs Stadium; Spartanburg, SC	ESPN+	W 35–13	3,091
*Non-conference game; ^{†}Homecoming; All times are in Eastern time

== Game summaries ==
=== at South Carolina State ===
Wofford Terriers (0–0) at South Carolina State Bulldogs (0–0) – Game summary

Quarter	1	2	3	4	Total
Terriers	0	7	0	8	15
Bulldogs	3	3	3	7	16

at Oliver C. Dawson Stadium • Orangeburg, South Carolina

- Date: August 30
- Game time: 6:00 PM EDT
- Game weather: Sunny, 85 °F (29 °C)
- Game attendance: 6,208
- Referee: Javarro Edwards
- TV: ESPN+
- Box score, Recap

Game information
First quarter
- SCST – Nico Cavanillas Alti 33-yard field goal, 6:47. Bulldogs 3–0. Drive: 18 plays, 63 yards, 8:08.

Second quarter

- SCST – Nico Cavanillas Alti 40-yard field goal, 2:51. Bulldogs 6–0. Drive: 8 plays, 35 yards, 1:12.
- WOF – Colby Alexander 89-yard kickoff return (Connor Deviney kick), 2:17. Terriers 7–6.

Third quarter

- SCST – Nico Cavanillas Alti 24-yard field goal, 8:33. Bulldogs 9–7. Drive: 11 plays, 54 yards, 4:29.

Fourth quarter

- WOF – C. J. Adams 0-yard blocked punt return (pass failed), 12:22. Terriers 13–9.
- WOF – William Atkins IV sacked in own end zone by Brandon Maina, 9:11. Terriers 15–9.
- SCST – Shamontae Burgess 12-yard pass from Ryan Stubblefield (Nico Cavanillas Alti kick), 1:29. Bulldogs 16–15. Drive: 10 plays, 74 yards, 3:11.

Statistics	WOF	SCST
First downs	10	23
Total yards	142	410
Rushing yards	86	111
Passing yards	56	299
Passing: Comp–Att–Int	6–21–0	27–50–0
Time of possession	25:47	34:13

Team	Category	Player	Statistics
Wofford	Passing	Jayden Whitaker	6/21, 56 yards
Wofford	Rushing	Gerald Modest	7 carries, 34 yards
Wofford	Receiving	C. J. Adams	1 reception, 16 yards
South Carolina State	Passing	William Atkins IV	17/33, 175 yards
South Carolina State	Rushing	K. Z. Adams	15 carries, 50 yards
South Carolina State	Receiving	Jalen Johnson	6 receptions, 93 yards

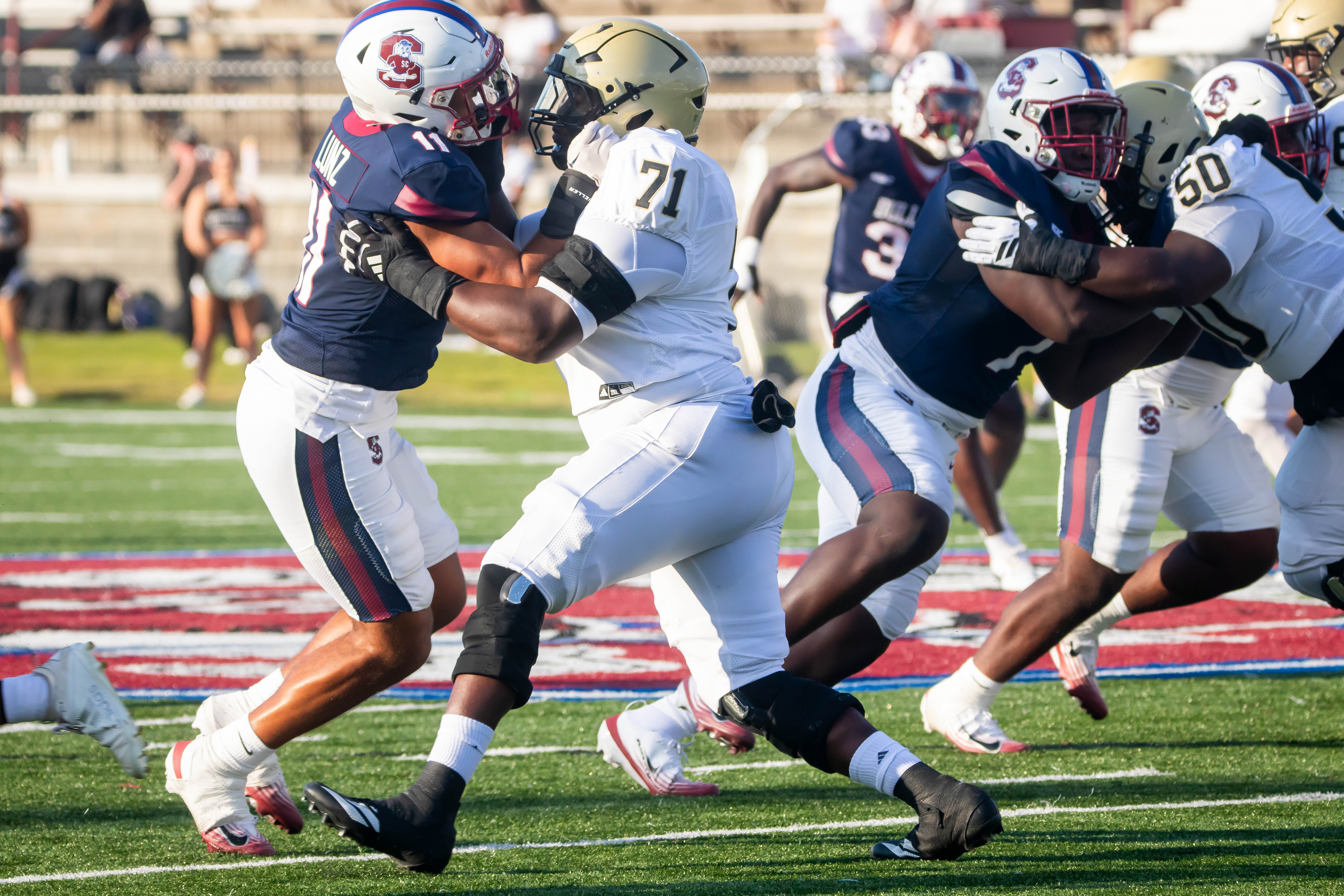
Wofford at SCSU 2025

=== Richmond ===
Richmond Spiders (0-1) at Wofford Terriers (0-1) – Game summary

Quarter	1	2	3	4	Total
Spiders	7	0	0	7	14
Terriers	7	0	3	0	10

at Gibbs Stadium • Spartanburg, SC

- Date: September 6
- Game time: 6:00 p.m. EDT
- Game weather: Cloudy • Temperature: 76 °F (24 °C) • Wind: W at 6 miles per hour (9.7 km/h)
- Game attendance: 2,754
- Referee: Jason Graham
- TV announcers (ESPN+): Jim Noble (play-by-play), Thom Henson (analyst) and Vann Hipp (sideline)

Game information

First quarter

- (7:12) RICH - Kyle Wickersham 11-yard pass to Andrew King, Jayden Alsheskie kick (Drive: 11 Plays, 90 yards, 4:27; RICH 7–0)
- (0:00) WOF - CJ Coombes 72-yard interception return, Connor Deviney kick (TIED 7–7)

Second quarter

- no scoring

Third quarter

- (11:03) WOF - Sam Spence 47-yard field goal (Drive: 11 Plays, 46 yards, 3:57; WOF 10–7)

Fourth quarter

- (14:26) RICH - Kyle Wickersham 10-yard run, Jayden Alsheskie kick (Drive: 9 Plays, 54 yards, 4:43; RICH 14–10)

Statistics	RICH	WOF
First downs	16	13
Total yards	272	158
Rushing yards	119	47
Passing yards	153	111
Passing: Comp–Att–Int	20–29–1	12–25–0
Time of possession	37:07	22:53

Team	Category	Player	Statistics
Richmond	Passing	Kyle Wickersham	20–29, 153 yards, 1 TD
Richmond	Rushing	Kyle Wickersham	17 carries, 78 yards, 1 TD
Richmond	Receiving	Quanye Veney	3 receptions, 42 yards
Wofford	Passing	Ethan Drumm	12–25, 111 yards
Wofford	Rushing	Ihson Jackson-Anderson	7 carries, 45 yards
Wofford	Receiving	Ivory Aikens	6 receptions, 38 yards

=== at Mercer ===
Wofford Terriers (0-2) at Mercer Bears (0-1) – Game summary

Quarter	1	2	3	4	Total
Terriers	-	-	-	-	0
Bears	-	-	-	-	0

at Five Star Stadium • Macon, GA

- Date: September 13
- Game time: 6:00 p.m. EDT
- TV announcers (ESPN+): Frank Malloy (play-by-play) and Phil Cox (analyst)

Statistics	WOF	MER
First downs		
Total yards		
Rushing yards		
Passing yards		
Passing: Comp–Att–Int		
Time of possession		

Team	Category	Player	Statistics
Wofford	Passing		
Wofford	Rushing		
Wofford	Receiving		
Mercer	Passing		
Mercer	Rushing		
Mercer	Receiving		

=== at Virginia Tech (FBS) ===
Wofford Terriers (0-3) at Virginia Tech Hokies (FBS) (0-3) – Game summary

Quarter	1	2	3	4	Total
Terriers	0	3	0	3	6
Hokies (FBS)	7	14	10	7	38

at Lane Stadium • Blacksburg, VA

- Date: September 20
- Game time: 12:00 p.m. EDT
- Game attendance: 57,229
- Referee: Nolan Dumas
- TV announcers (ACCNX/ESPN+): Doug Sherman (play-by-play) and Forrest Conoly (analyst)

Game information

First quarter

- VT – Braydon Bennett 3-yard run (John Love kick), 6:26. Hokies 7–0. Drive: 4 plays, 68 yards, 2:04.

Second quarter

- VT – Devin Alves 19-yard pass from Kyron Drones (John Love kick), 11:53. Hokies 14–0. Drive: 9 plays, 80 yards, 3:40.
- VT – Ayden Greene 18-yard pass from Kyron Drones (John Love kick), 6:24. Hokies 21–0. Drive: 8 plays, 69 yards, 3:05.
- WOF – Sam Spence 43-yard field goal, 0:43. Hokies 21–3. Drive: 8 plays, 35 yards, 2:42.

Third quarter

- VT – John Love 20-yard field goal, 9:00. Hokies 24–3. Drive: 11 plays, 62 yards, 5:49.
- VT – Kyron Drones 1-yard run (John Love kick), 1:08. Hokies 31–3. Drive: 10 plays, 56 yards, 5:37.

Fourth quarter

- WOF – Sam Spence 42-yard field goal, 13:18. Hokies 31–6. Drive: 8 plays, 51 yards, 2:50.
- VT – Kyron Drones 2-yard run (John Love kick), 10:52. Hokies 38–6. Drive: 6 plays, 65 yards, 2:26.

Statistics	WOF	VT
First downs	8	28
Plays–yards	50–141	71–461
Rushes–yards	23–(-1)	37–154
Passing yards	142	307
Passing: comp–att–int	16–27–1	27–34–0
Turnovers	1	1
Time of possession	25:31	34:29

Team	Category	Player	Statistics
Wofford	Passing	Jayden Whitaker	16/27, 142 yards, INT
Wofford	Rushing	Ihson Jackson-Anderson	7 carries, 12 yards
Wofford	Receiving	Isaiah Scott	3 receptions, 57 yards
Virginia Tech	Passing	Kyron Drones	27/32, 307 yards, 2 TD
Virginia Tech	Rushing	Marcellous Hawkins	13 carries, 97 yards
Virginia Tech	Receiving	P.J. Prioleau	7 receptions, 65 yards

=== Western Carolina ===
Western Carolina Catamounts (2–3) at Wofford Terriers (0–4) – Game summary

Quarter	1	2	3	4	Total
Catamounts	7	7	6	3	23
Terriers	8	7	6	0	21

at Gibbs Stadium • Spartanburg, SC

- Date: October 4
- Game time: 1:30 p.m. EDT
- Game weather: Sunny • Temperature: 75 °F (24 °C) • Wind: NE at 5 miles per hour (8.0 km/h)
- Game attendance: 3,571
- Referee: Bruce Austin
- TV announcers (ESPN+): Jim Noble (play-by-play), Thom Henson (analyst) and Van Hipp (sideline)

Game information

First Quarter

- (11:26) WOF – Ihson Jackson-Anderson 49-yard pass from Jayden Whitaker, Blake Shirley pass (Drive: 4 plays, 57 yards, 1:50; Wofford 8–0)
- (5:29) WCU – James Tyre 2-yard pass from Taron Dickens, Marcus Trout kick (Drive: 14 plays, 85 yards, 5:52; Wofford 8–7)

Second Quarter

- (3:40) WCU – James Tyre 5-yard pass from Taron Dickens, Marcus Trout kick (Drive: 13 plays, 73 yards, 6:07; Western Carolina 14–8)
- (0:48) WOF – Isaiah Scott 66-yard punt return, Sam Spence kick (Wofford 15–14)

Third Quarter

- (0:45) WCU – James Tyre 4-yard pass from Taron Dickens (Drive: 11 plays, 78 yards, 5:06; Western Carolina 20–15)
- (0:29) WOF – Ivory Aikens 83-yard pass from Jayden Whitaker (Drive: 1 play, 83 yards, 0:12; Wofford 21–20)

Fourth Quarter

- (0:23) WCU – Marcus Trout 34-yard field goal (Drive: 16 plays, 51 yards, 4:40; Western Carolina 23–21)

Statistics	WCU	WOF
First downs	31	8
Total yards	471	241
Rushing yards	93	42
Passing yards	378	209
Passing: Comp–Att–Int	53–56–0	10–18–0
Time of possession	38:46	21:14

Team	Category	Player	Statistics
Western Carolina	Passing	Taron Dickens	53/56, 378 yards, 3 TD
Western Carolina	Rushing	Taron Dickens	19 carries, 44 yards
Western Carolina	Receiving	James Tyre	13 receptions, 102 yards, 3 TD
Wofford	Passing	Jayden Whitaker	10/18, 209 yards, 2 TD
Wofford	Rushing	Ihson Jackson-Anderson	10 carries, 29 yards
Wofford	Receiving	Ivory Aikens	3 receptions, 97 yards, TD

=== Norfolk State ===
Norfolk State Spartans (1–5) vs. Wofford Terriers (0–5) – Game summary

Quarter	1	2	3	4	Total
Spartans	7	0	7	0	14
Terriers	7	7	7	10	31

at Gibbs Stadium • Spartanburg, SC

- Date: October 11
- Game time: 1:30 p.m. EDT
- TV announcers (ESPN+): Jim Noble (play-by-play), Thom Henson (analyst) and Van Hipp (sideline)

Statistics	NORF	WOF
First downs		
Total yards		
Rushing yards		
Passing yards		
Passing: Comp–Att–Int		
Time of possession		

Team	Category	Player	Statistics
Norfolk State	Passing		
Norfolk State	Rushing		
Norfolk State	Receiving		
Wofford	Passing		
Wofford	Rushing		
Wofford	Receiving		

=== Furman (rivalry) ===
Furman Paladins (4–2) at Wofford Terriers (1–5) – Game summary

Quarter	1	2	3	4	Total
Paladins	0	6	7	0	13
Terriers	7	14	0	10	31

at Gibbs Stadium • Spartanburg, SC

- Date: October 18
- Game time: 12:00 p.m. EDT
- Game weather: Sunny • Temperature: 72 °F (22 °C) • Wind: SW at 6 miles per hour (9.7 km/h)
- Game attendance: 3,086
- Referee: Jeff Page
- TV announcers (ESPN+/WYCW): Pete Yanity (play-by-play), Jay Sonnhalter (analyst) and Dave Friedman (sideline)

Game information

First Quarter

- (8:30) WOF – Colby Alexander 29-yard pass from JT Fayard, Devery Cagle kick (Drive: 7 plays, 85 yards, 3:06; Wofford 7–0)

Second Quarter

- (10:57) FUR – Devin Hester Jr. 10-yard pass from Trey Hedden (Drive: 8 plays, 75 yards, 4:36; Wofford 7–6)
- (3:37) WOF – Terrence Honeywood 23-yard pass from JT Fayard, Sam Spence kick (Drive: 6 plays, 54 yards, 3:25; Wofford 14–6)
- (0:42) WOF – Ihson Jackson-Anderson 1-yard run, Sam Spence kick (Drive: 7 plays, 70 yards, 1:33; Wofford 21–6)

Third Quarter

- (5:10) FUR – Gavin Hall 4-yard run, Ian Williams kick (Drive: 4 plays, 18 yards, 2:12; Wofford 21–13)

Fourth Quarter

- (12:06) WOF – Javario Tinch 66-yard interception, Sam Spence kick (Wofford 28–13)
- (4:16) WOF – Sam Spence 42-yard field goal (Drive: 4 plays, 1 yard, 1:14; Wofford 31–13)

Statistics	FUR	WOF
First downs	16	17
Total yards	329	325
Rushing yards	72	146
Passing yards	257	179
Passing: Comp–Att–Int	27–41–3	18–25–1
Time of possession	32:02	27:58

Team	Category	Player	Statistics
Furman	Passing	Trey Hedden	27/39, 257 yards, TD, 3 INT
Furman	Rushing	Gavin Hall	17 carries, 61 yards, TD
Furman	Receiving	Devin Hester Jr.	6 receptions, 82 yards, TD
Wofford	Passing	JT Fayard	18/25, 179 yards, 2 TD, INT
Wofford	Rushing	Ihson Jackson-Anderson	15 carries, 75 yards, TD
Wofford	Receiving	Isaiah Scott	7 receptions, 91 yards

=== at East Tennessee State ===
Wofford Terriers (2–5) at East Tennessee State Buccaneers (3–5) – Game summary

Quarter	1	2	3	4	Total
Terriers	7	3	0	0	10
Buccaneers	14	0	0	0	14

at William B. Greene Jr. Stadium • Johnson City, TN

- Date: October 25
- Game time: 3:30 p.m. EDT
- Game weather: Cloudy • Temperature: 64 °F (18 °C) • Wind: E at 4 miles per hour (6.4 km/h)
- Game attendance: 9,836
- Referee: Jason Graham
- TV announcers (ESPN+): Keith Brake (play-by-play), Mark Hutsell (analyst) and Kennedy Story (sideline)

Game information

First Quarter

- (10:54) ETSU – Devontae Houston 28-yard run, Ewan Johnson kick (Drive: 6 plays, 80 yards, 2:31; East Tennessee State 7–0)
- (7:59) WOF – Colby Alexander 17-yard run, Sam Spence kick (Drive: 7 plays, 72 yards, 2:55; Tied 7–7)
- (3:32) ETSU – Devontae Houston 6-yard run, Ewan Johnson kick (Drive: 11 plays, 75 yards, 4:27; East Tennessee State 14–7)

Second Quarter

- (8:34) WOF – Sam Spence 34-yard field goal (Drive: 8 plays, 71 yards, 4:53; East Tennessee State 14–10)

Third Quarter

No scoring plays

Fourth Quarter

No scoring plays

Statistics	WOF	ETSU
First downs	16	20
Total yards	307	323
Rushing yards	162	123
Passing yards	145	200
Passing: Comp–Att–Int	22–29–0	26–31–0
Time of possession	29:01	30:59

Team	Category	Player	Statistics
Wofford	Passing	JT Fayard	22/29, 145 yards
Wofford	Rushing	Gerald Modest Jr.	12 carries, 80 yards
Wofford	Receiving	Isaiah Scott	4 receptions, 46 yards
East Tennessee State	Passing	Cade McNamara	12/13, 103 yards
East Tennessee State	Rushing	Devontae Houston	18 carries, 94 yards, 2 TDs
East Tennessee State	Receiving	Jeremiah Harrison	7 receptions, 79 yards

=== Samford ===
Samford Bulldogs (1–7) at Wofford Terriers (2–6) – Game summary

Quarter	1	2	3	4	Total
Bulldogs	10	0	6	0	16
Terriers	14	0	9	3	26

at Gibbs Stadium • Spartanburg, SC

- Date: November 1
- Game time: 1:30 p.m. EDT
- Game weather: Sunny • Temperature: 60 °F (16 °C) • Wind: E at 1 mile per hour (1.6 km/h)
- Game attendance: 4,985
- Referee: Jake Grombach
- TV announcers (ESPN+): Jim Noble (play-by-play), Thom Henson (analyst) and Van Hipp (sideline)

Game information

First quarter

- (11:49) SAM – Charlie Gilliam 2-yard pass from Charlie Gilliam, Jake Garner kick (Drive: 9 plays, 61 yards, 3:06; Samford 7–0)
- (9:51) WOF – Maximus Pulley 25-yard interception, Sam Spence kick (Tied 7–7)
- (8:50) WOF – Gerald Modest Jr. 5-yard run, Sam Spence kick (Drive: 2 plays, 17 yards, 0:48; Wofford 14–7)
- (3:46) SAM – Jake Garner 23-yard field goal (Drive: 4 plays, -3 yards, 1:25; Wofford 14–10)

Second quarter

No scoring plays

Third quarter

- (12:46) WOF – Eli Campbell 42-yard interception, Sam Spence kick (Wofford 21–10)
- (9:26) SAM – Jake Garner 25-yard field goal (Drive: 9 plays, 65 yards, 3:16; Wofford 21–13)
- (4:13) SAM – Jake Garner 30-yard field goal (Drive: 12 plays, 40 yards, 3:32; Wofford 21–16)
- (1:01) WOF – Brandon Maina 0-yard safety (Wofford 23–16)

Fourth quarter

- (11:26) WOF – Sam Spence 25-yard field goal (Drive: 9 plays, 55 yards, 4:27; Wofford 26–16)

Statistics	SAM	WOF
First downs	18	10
Total yards	351	191
Rushing yards	19	111
Passing yards	332	80
Passing: Comp–Att–Int	34–51–4	14–24–1
Time of possession	28:14	31:46

Team	Category	Player	Statistics
Samford	Passing	Quincy Crittendon	19/25, 219 yards
Samford	Rushing	CJ Evans	4 carries, 12 yards
Samford	Receiving	Calvin Jones	9 receptions, 126 yards, TD
Wofford	Passing	JT Fayard	14/24, 80 yards, INT
Wofford	Rushing	Ihson Jackson-Anderson	16 carries, 85 yards
Wofford	Receiving	Ihson Jackson-Anderson	3 receptions, 35 yards

=== at VMI ===
Wofford Terriers (3–6) vs. VMI Keydets (1–8) – Game summary

Quarter	1	2	3	4	Total
Terriers	-	-	-	-	0
Keydets	-	-	-	-	0

at Alumni Memorial Field • Lexington, VA

- Date: November 8
- Game time: 1:30 p.m. EDT
- TV: ESPN+

Statistics	WOF	VMI
First downs		
Total yards		
Rushing yards		
Passing yards		
Passing: Comp–Att–Int		
Time of possession		

Team	Category	Player	Statistics
Wofford	Passing		
Wofford	Rushing		
Wofford	Receiving		
VMI	Passing		
VMI	Rushing		
VMI	Receiving		

=== at The Citadel (rivalry) ===
Wofford Terriers (0–0) vs. The Citadel Bulldogs (0–0) – Game summary

Quarter	1	2	3	4	Total
Terriers	-	-	-	-	0
Bulldogs	-	-	-	-	0

at Johnson Hagood Stadium • Charleston, SC

- Date: November 15
- Game time: 2:00 PM EST

Statistics	WOF	CIT
First downs		
Total yards		
Rushing yards		
Passing yards		
Passing: Comp–Att–Int		
Time of possession		

Team	Category	Player	Statistics
Wofford	Passing		
Wofford	Rushing		
Wofford	Receiving		
The Citadel	Passing		
The Citadel	Rushing		
The Citadel	Receiving		

=== Chattanooga ===
Chattanooga Mocs (0–0) vs. Wofford Terriers (0–0) – Game summary

Quarter	1	2	3	4	Total
Mocs	-	-	-	-	0
Terriers	-	-	-	-	0

at Gibbs Stadium • Spartanburg, SC

- Date: November 22

Statistics	UTC	WOF
First downs		
Total yards		
Rushing yards		
Passing yards		
Passing: Comp–Att–Int		
Time of possession		

Team	Category	Player	Statistics
Chattanooga	Passing		
Chattanooga	Rushing		
Chattanooga	Receiving		
Wofford	Passing		
Wofford	Rushing		
Wofford	Receiving		
