= 2025 Western Carolina Catamounts football team =

American college football season

2025 Western Carolina Catamounts football
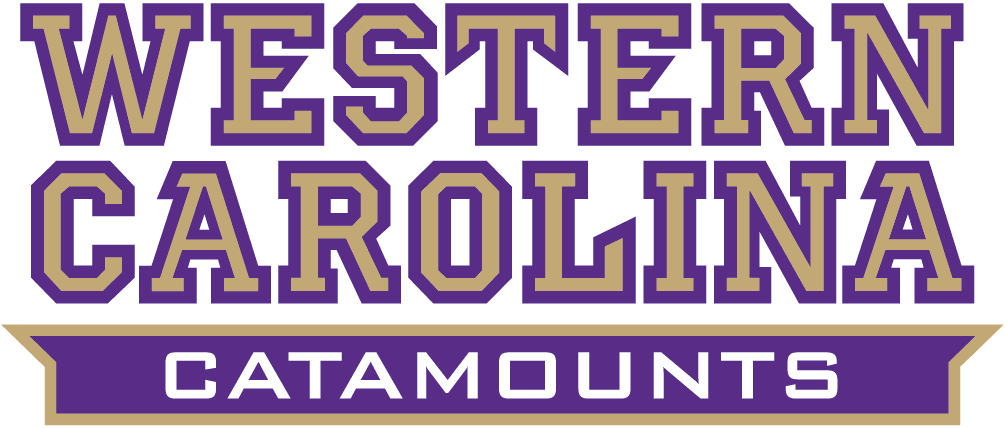
- Conference: Southern Conference
- Record: 7–5 (6–2 SoCon)
- Head coach: Kerwin Bell (5th season)
- Offensive coordinator: Rylan Wells (2nd season)
- Defensive coordinator: Jerry Odom (2nd season)
- Home stadium: Bob Waters Field at E. J. Whitmire Stadium

2025 Southern Conference football standings
	Conf.			Overall
Team	W		L	W		L
No. 17 Mercer $^	8	–	0	9	–	3
Western Carolina	6	–	2	7	–	5
East Tennessee State	5	–	3	7	–	5
Wofford	5	–	3	6	–	6
Chattanooga	4	–	4	5	–	7
Furman	4	–	4	6	–	6
The Citadel	3	–	5	4	–	8
Samford	1	–	7	1	–	11
VMI	0	–	8	1	–	11
$ – Conference champion; ^ – FCS playoff participant; Rankings from STATS Poll

The 2025 Western Carolina Catamounts football team represented Western Carolina University as a member of the Southern Conference (SoCon) during the 2025 NCAA Division I FCS football season. The Catamounts were led by fifth-year head coach Kerwin Bell and played at the Bob Waters Field at E. J. Whitmire Stadium in Cullowhee, North Carolina.

The Western Carolina Catamounts drew an average home attendance of 10,986, the 20th-highest of all NCAA Division I FCS football teams.

== Schedule ==
Date	Time	Opponent	Rank	Site	TV	Result	Attendance
August 30	6:00 p.m.	Gardner–Webb*	No. 18	Bob Waters Field at E. J. Whitmire Stadium; Cullowhee, NC	ESPN+	L 45–52	11,889
September 6	2:00 p.m.	at Wake Forest*		Allegacy Federal Credit Union Stadium; Winston-Salem, NC	ACCNX	L 10–42	28,239
September 13	2:30 p.m.	Elon*		Bob Waters Field at E. J. Whitmire Stadium; Cullowhee, NC	ESPN+	L 31–37	10,007
September 20	2:30 p.m.	Samford		Bob Waters Field at E. J. Whitmire Stadium; Cullowhee, NC	ESPN+	W 50–35	10,593
September 27	3:30 p.m.	at Campbell*		Barker–Lane Stadium; Buies Creek, NC	FloFootball	W 42–35	4,060
October 4	1:30 p.m.	at Wofford		Gibbs Stadium; Spartanburg, SC	ESPN+	W 23–21	3,571
October 11	2:30 p.m.	Furman		Bob Waters Field at E. J. Whitmire Stadium; Cullowhee, NC	ESPN+	W 52–7	8,375
October 18	2:00 p.m.	at The Citadel		Johnson Hagood Stadium; Charleston, SC	ESPN+	W 45−38	9,151
November 1	4:00 p.m.	at Chattanooga		Finley Stadium; Chattanooga, TN	ESPN+	W 35–28	7,711
November 8	2:30 p.m.	No. 12 Mercer^{†}	No. 24	Bob Waters Field at E. J. Whitmire Stadium; Cullowhee, NC	ESPN+	L 47–49	14,510
November 15	12:00 p.m.	East Tennessee State	No. 25	Bob Waters Field at E. J. Whitmire Stadium; Cullowhee, NC	ESPN+	L 35–52	10,543
November 22	12:00 p.m.	at VMI		Alumni Memorial Field; Lexington, VA	ESPN+	W 48–6	3,588
*Non-conference game; ^{†}Homecoming; Rankings from STATS Poll released prior to the game; All times are in Eastern time

== Game summaries ==
=== Gardner–Webb ===
Game One – Gardner–Webb Runnin' Bulldogs (0–0) at No. 18 Western Carolina Catamounts (0–0) – Game summary

Quarter	1	2	3	4	Total
Runnin' Bulldogs	7	14	7	24	52
No. 18 Catamounts	21	14	7	3	45

at E. J. Whitmire Stadium • Cullowhee, NC

- Date: Saturday August 30, 2025
- Game time: 6:00 p.m. EDT
- Game attendance: 11,889
- Referee: Jeff Page
- TV announcers (ESPN+): Justin Biegel (play-by-play) and Jack Delongchamps (analyst)

Game information

First quarter

- GWEB – Quasean Holmes 65-yard run (Charlie Viorel kick), 14:02. Runnin' Bulldogs 7–0. Drive: 2 plays, 65 yards, 0:14.
- WCU – Patrick Boyd Jr. 28-yard run (Christian Lowery kick), 12:09. Tied 7–7. Drive: 1 play, 28 yards, 0:06.
- WCU – Camury Reid 3-yard run (Christian Lowery kick), 8:18. Catamounts 14–7. Drive: 9 plays, 64 yards, 2:30.
- WCU – James Tyre 5-yard pass from Bennett Judy (Christian Lowery kick), 4:30. Catamounts 21–7. Drive: 3 plays, 4 yards, 1:06.

Second quarter

- WCU – Trey Walker 25-yard pass from Bennett Judy (Christian Lowery kick), 13:28. Catamounts 28–7. Drive: 12 plays, 80 yards, 4:16.
- WCU – Malik Knight 69-yard pass from Isaac Lee (Christian Lowery kick), 8:24. Catamounts 35–7. Drive: 2 plays, 80 yards, 0:38.
- GWEB – Anthony Lowe 18-yard pass from Nate Hampton (Charlie Viorel kick), 5:23. Catamounts 35–14. Drive: 9 plays, 75 yards, 3:01.
- GWEB – Nate Hampton 1-yard run (Charlie Viorel kick), 1:08. Catamounts 35–21. Drive: 7 plays, 65 yards, 2:16.

Third quarter

- GWEB – Anthony Lowe 36-yard pass from Nate Hampton (Charlie Viorel kick), 12:20. Catamounts 35–28. Drive: 6 plays, 75 yards, 2:35.
- WCU – Camury Reid 1-yard run (Christian Lowery kick), 1:26. Catamounts 42–28. Drive: 5 plays, 83 yards, 2:09.

Fourth quarter

- GWEB – Nate Hampton 16-yard run (Charlie Viorel kick), 13:51. Catamounts 42–35. Drive: 8 plays, 75 yards, 2:33.
- GWEB – Nate Hampton 7-yard run (Charlie Viorel kick), 10:16. Tied 42–42. Drive: 4 plays, 69 yards, 1:39.
- GWEB – Charlie Viorel 22-yard field goal, 2:36. Runnin' Bulldogs 45–42. Drive: 7 plays, 24 yards, 3:27.
- GWEB – Nate Hampton 26-yard run (Charlie Viorel kick), 1:48. Runnin' Bulldogs 52–42. Drive: 1 play, 26 yards, 0:08.
- WCU – Christian Lowery 29-yard field goal, 0:42. Runnin' Buldogs 52–45. Drive: 8 plays, 65 yards, 1:00.

Statistics	GWEB	WCU
First downs	25	21
Total yards	627	454
Rushes–yards	57–335	42–221
Passing yards	292	233
Passing: Comp–Att–Int	13–33–1	18–36–1
Turnovers	2	3
Time of possession	35:38	24:22

Team	Category	Player	Statistics
Gardner–Webb	Passing	Nate Hampton	12/30, 263 yards, 2 TD
Gardner–Webb	Rushing	Nate Hampton	28 carries, 132 yards, 4 TD
Gardner–Webb	Receiving	Chris Lofton	3 receptions, 102 yards
Western Carolina	Passing	Bennett Judy	15/27, 151 yards, 2 TD, INT
Western Carolina	Rushing	Patrick Boyd Jr.	15 carries, 142 yards, TD
Western Carolina	Receiving	Malik Knight	1 reception, 69 yards, TD

=== at Wake Forest (FBS) ===
Western Carolina Catamounts (0–1) at Wake Forest Demon Deacons (FBS) (1–0) – Game summary

Quarter	1	2	3	4	Total
Catamounts	0	3	0	7	10
Demon Deacons (FBS)	21	0	21	0	42

at Allegacy Federal Credit Union Stadium • Winston-Salem, North Carolina

- Date: September 6
- Game time: 2:00 p.m.
- Game weather:
- Game attendance: 28,239
- Referee: Garrett Dickerson
- TV announcers (ACCNX/ESPN+): Doug Sherman (play-by-play) and Reggie Walker (analyst)

Game information

First quarter

- WAKE – Robby Ashford 41-yard run (Connor Calvert kick), 5:57. Demon Deacons 7–0. Drive: 5 plays, 62 yards, 0:57.
- WAKE – Demond Claiborne 33-yard run (pass failed), 2:59. Demon Deacons 13–0. Drive: 2 plays, 73 yards, 0:42.
- WAKE – Demond Claiborne 27-yard run (pass failed), 2:47. Demon Deacons 19–0. Drive: 1 play, 27 yards, 0:05.
- WAKE Team Safety, 0:27. Demon Deacons 21–0.

Second quarter

- WCU – Christian Lowery 23-yard field goal, 5:46. Demon Deacons 21–3. Drive: 17 plays, 74 yards, 9:10.

Third quarter

- WAKE – Demond Claiborne 85-yard run (Connor Calvert kick), 12:29. Demon Deacons 28–3. Drive: 2 plays, 83 yards, 0:42.
- WAKE – Sterling Berkhalter 51-yard pass from Robby Ashford (Connor Calvert kick), 7:16. Demon Deacons 35–3. Drive: 2 plays, 93 yards, 0:37.
- WAKE – Jeremiah Melvin 27-yard pass from Deshawn Purdie (Connor Calvert kick), 1:52. Demon Deacons 42–3. Drive: 3 plays, 30 yards, 0:41.

Fourth quarter

- WCU – Markel Townsend 1-yard run (Marcus Trout kick), 6:49. Demon Deacons 42–10. Drive: 14 plays, 75 yards, 10:03.

Statistics	WCU	WAKE
First downs	17	21
Plays–yards	76–238	57–542
Rushes–yards	33–34	31–273
Passing yards	204	269
Passing: comp–att–int	26–43–1	16–26–1
Turnovers	2	3
Time of possession	35:58	24:02

Team	Category	Player	Statistics
Western Carolina	Passing	Bennett Judy	18/32, 155 yards, INT
Western Carolina	Rushing	Isaac Lee	5 carries, 40 yards
Western Carolina	Receiving	Malik Knight	5 receptions, 56 yards
Wake Forest	Passing	Robby Ashford	13/22, 227 yards, TD, INT
Wake Forest	Rushing	Demond Claiborne	10 carries, 193 yards, 3 TD
Wake Forest	Receiving	Chris Barnes	6 receptions, 149 yards

=== Elon ===
Elon Phoenix (1-1) at Western Carolina Catamounts (0-2) – Game summary

Quarter	1	2	3	4	Total
Phoenix	14	9	6	8	37
Catamounts	7	7	14	3	31

at Bob Waters Field at E. J. Whitmire Stadium • Cullowhee, NC

- Date: September 13
- Game time: 2:30 p.m. EDT
- Game weather: Sunny • Temperature: 77 °F (25 °C) • Wind: NW at 4 miles per hour (6.4 km/h)
- Game attendance: 10,007
- Referee: Jake Grombach
- TV announcers (ESPN+): Pete Yanity (play-by-play) and John Brannon III (analyst)

Game information

First quarter

- ELON – Zimere Winston 78-yard pass from Landen Clark (Luke Barnes kick), 14:07. Phoenix 7–0. Drive: 3 plays, 81 yards, 0:50.
- WCU – James Tyre 4-yard pass from Bennett Judy (Marcus Trout kick), 10:48. Tied 7–7. Drive: 10 plays, 78 yards, 3:19.
- ELON – Landyn Backey 35-yard pass from Landen Clark (Luke Barnes kick), 0:06. Phoenix 14–7. Drive: 3 plays, 88 yards, 1:21.

Second quarter

- ELON – Landen Clark 10-yard run (Pass failed), 9:13. Phoenix 20–7. Drive: 12 plays, 88 yards, 5:30.
- WCU – Dominic Dutton 7-yard pass from Isaac Lee (Marcus Trout kick), 3:06. Phoenix 20–14. Drive: 14 plays, 75 yards, 6:07.
- ELON – Luke Barnes 48-yard field goal, 0:00. Phoenix 23–14. Drive: 6 plays, 49 yards, 0:41.

Third quarter

- WCU – Dominic Dutton 97-yard kick return (Marcus Trout kick), 14:48. Phoenix 23–21. Drive: 0 plays, 0 yards, 0:00.
- WCU – James Tyre 62-yard fumble recovery (Christian Lowery kick), 11:07. Catamounts 28–23. Drive: 3 plays, 80 yards, 0:46.
- ELON – Luke Barnes 38-yard field goal, 8:22. Catamounts 28–26. Drive: 6 plays, 26 yards, 2:34.
- ELON – Luke Barnes 42-yard field goal, 1:34. Phoenix 29–28. Drive: 11 plays, 46 yards, 4:58.

Fourth quarter

- WCU – Marcus Trout 28-yard field goal, 13:05. Catamounts 31–29. Drive: 12 plays, 65 yards, 3:29.
- ELON – Landen Clark 10-yard run (Landen Clark pass), 4:53. Phoenix 37–31. Drive: 10 plays, 79 yards, 3:59.

Statistics	ELON	WCU
First downs	24	25
Total yards	456	425
Rushing yards	151	179
Passing yards	305	246
Passing: Comp–Att–Int	11–29–2	36–55–2
Time of possession	30:23	29:27

Team	Category	Player	Statistics
Elon	Passing	Landen Clark	11/28, 305 yards, 2 TD, 2 INT
Elon	Rushing	Landen Clark	25 carries, 72 yards
Elon	Receiving	Isaiah Fuhrmann	5 receptions, 105 yards
Western Carolina	Passing	Isaac Lee	19/31, 132 yards, TD, 2 INT
Western Carolina	Rushing	Patrick Boyd Jr.	10 carries, 58 yards
Western Carolina	Receiving	James Tyre	9 receptions, 122 yards, TD

=== Samford ===
Samford Bulldogs (0-3) at Western Carolina Catamounts (0-3) – Game summary

Quarter	1	2	3	4	Total
Bulldogs	6	14	6	9	35
Catamounts	14	7	29	0	50

at Bob Waters Field at E. J. Whitmire Stadium • Cullowhee, NC

- Date: September 20
- Game time: 2:30 PM EDT
- Game weather: Sunny • Temperature: 79 °F (26 °C) • Wind: SE at 7 miles per hour (11 km/h)
- Game attendance: 10,593
- Referee: Brian Hilpisch
- TV announcers (ESPN+): Pete Yanity (play-by-play) and John Brannon III (analyst)

Game information

First quarter

- SAM – Jake Garner 28-yard field goal, 11:07. Bulldogs 3–0. Drive: 11 plays, 64 yards, 3:53.
- WCU – Camury Reid 14-yard pass from Taron Dickens (Marcus Trout kick), 8:26. Catamounts 7–3. Drive: 8 plays, 71 yards, 2:34.
- SAM – Jake Garner 29-yard field goal, 3:17. Catamounts 7–6. Drive: 13 plays, 68 yards, 5:05.
- WCU – James Tyre 6-yard pass from Taron Dickens (Marcus Trout kick), 1:06. Catamounts 14–6. Drive: 5 plays, 75 yards, 2:11.

Second quarter

- SAM – Calvin Jones 28-yard pass from Quincy Crittendon (Jake Garner kick), 13:12. Catamounts 14–13. Drive: 9 plays, 75 yards, 2:54.
- SAM – Calvin Jones 11-yard pass from Quincy Crittendon (Jake Garner kick), 9:36. Bulldogs 20–14. Drive: 6 plays, 66 yards, 1:50.
- WCU – Jordan Thomas 2-yard pass from Taron Dickens, 1:32. Catamounts 21–20. Drive: 8 plays, 58 yards, 2:01.

Third quarter

- WCU – Painter Richards-Baker 20-yard pass from Taron Dickens (Marcus Trout kick), 13:42. Catamounts 28–20. Drive: 4 plays, 48 yards, 1:11.
- SAM – Calvin Jones 12-yard pass from Quincy Crittendon (Kick failed), 11:08. Catamounts 28–26. Drive: 7 plays, 75 yards, 2:34.
- WCU – Camury Reid 24-yard pass from Taron Dickens (Taron Dickens pass), 8:22. Catamounts 36–26. Drive: 9 plays, 65 yards, 2:46.
- WCU – Camury Reid 2-yard run (Marcus Trout kick), 3:08. Catamounts 43–26. Drive: 8 plays, 80 yards, 2:31.
- WCU – Camury Reid 62-yard pass from Taron Dickens (Marcus Trout kick), 1:12. Catamounts 50–26. Drive: 3 plays, 70 yards, 0:37.

Fourth quarter

- SAM – C.J. Evans 32-yard run (Pass failed), 8:50. Catamounts 50–33. Drive: 8 plays, 91 yards, 2:56.
- SAM – Jake Garner 33-yard field goal, 1:56. Catamounts 50–36. Drive: 10 plays, 61 yards, 1:43.

Statistics	SAM	WCU
First downs	34	31
Total yards	576	733
Rushing yards	120	151
Passing yards	456	582
Passing: Comp–Att–Int	35–53–1	35–46–0
Time of possession	30:13	29:47

Team	Category	Player	Statistics
Samford	Passing	Quincy Crittendon	35/53, 456 yards, 3 TD, INT
Samford	Rushing	C.J. Evans	15 carries, 56 yards, TD
Samford	Receiving	Jaden Gibson	9 receptions, 122 yards
Western Carolina	Passing	Taron Dickens	35/46, 582 yards, 6 TD
Western Carolina	Rushing	Markel Townsend	13 carries, 56 yards
Western Carolina	Receiving	Camury Reid	4 receptions, 107 yards, 3 TD

=== at Campbell ===
Western Carolina Catamounts (1-3) vs. Campbell Fighting Camels (1-3) – Game summary

Quarter	1	2	3	4	Total
Catamounts	7	21	7	7	42
Fighting Camels	0	10	8	17	35

at Barker–Lane Stadium • Buies Creek, NC

- Date: September 27
- Game time: 3:30 PM EDT
- Game weather: Cloudy • Temperature: 79 °F (26 °C) • Wind: SE at 3 miles per hour (4.8 km/h)
- Game attendance: 4,060
- Referee: Jeff Pumphrey
- TV announcers (FloFootball): Lendi Suggs (play-by-play) and Jay Sonnhalter (analyst)

Game information

First Quarter

- (10:37) WCU – Camury Reid 1-yard run, Marcus Trout kick (Drive: 3 plays, 12 yards, 0:40; Western Carolina 7–0)

Second Quarter

- (14:56) WCU – Brayden Blackmon 17-yard pass from Taron Dickens, Marcus Trout kick (Drive: 6 plays, 76 yards, 2:47; Western Carolina 14–0)
- (11:46) CAM – Alex Crabb 32-yard field goal (Drive: 7 plays, 45 yards, 2:58; Western Carolina 14–3)
- (8:36) WCU – Marcus Striggles 32-yard pass from Taron Dickens, Marcus Trout kick (Drive: 3 plays, 55 yards, 0:56; Western Carolina 21–3)
- (3:45) WCU – David Hulbert 9-yard pass from Taron Dickens, Marcus Trout kick (Drive: 5 plays, 89 yards, 1:24; Western Carolina 28–3)
- (0:17) CAM – Kamden Sixkiller 12-yard run, Alex Crabb kick (Drive: 12 plays, 83 yards, 3:19; Western Carolina 28–10)

Third Quarter

- (11:11) WCU – Patrick Boyd Jr. 10-yard pass from Taron Dickens, Marcus Trout kick (Drive: 4 plays, 34 yards, 2:07; Western Carolina 35–10)
- (7:08) CAM – Mike Chandler II 10-yard run, Trevor Wilson pass (Drive: 9 plays, 75 yards, 4:03; Western Carolina 35–18)

Fourth Quarter

- (13:12) CAM – Alex Crabb 21-yard field goal (Drive: 7 plays, 66 yards, 3:15; Western Carolina 35–21)
- (4:58) CAM – Stevie Keener 26-yard pass from Kamden Sixkiller, Alex Crabb kick (Drive: 6 plays, 62 yards, 2:04; Western Carolina 35–28)
- (4:19) WCU – Painter Richards-Baker 61-yard pass from James Tyre, Marcus Trout kick (Drive: 2 plays, 75 yards, 0:39; Western Carolina 42–28)
- (2:11) CAM – Kamden Sixkiller 5-yard run, Alex Crabb kick (Drive: 8 plays, 65 yards, 2:08; Western Carolina 42–35)

Statistics	WCU	CAM
First downs	27	24
Total yards	564	437
Rushing yards	76	153
Passing yards	488	284
Passing: Comp–Att–Int	27–41–0	20–48–1
Time of possession	23:20	36:40

Team	Category	Player	Statistics
Western Carolina	Passing	Taron Dickens	26/40, 427 yards, 4 TD
Western Carolina	Rushing	Camury Reid	11 carries, 43 yards, TD
Western Carolina	Receiving	James Tyre	6 receptions, 101 yards
Campbell	Passing	Kamden Sixkiller	18/45, 205 yards, TD, INT
Campbell	Rushing	Kamden Sixkiller	10 carries, 55 yards, 2 TD
Campbell	Receiving	Trayjen Llanas-Wilcox	5 receptions, 124 yards

=== at Wofford ===
Western Carolina Catamounts (2-3) vs. Wofford Terriers (0-4) – Game summary

Quarter	1	2	3	4	Total
Catamounts	7	7	6	3	23
Terriers	8	7	6	0	21

at Gibbs Stadium • Spartanburg, SC

- Date: October 4
- Game time: 1:30 p.m. EDT
- Game weather: Sunny • Temperature: 75 °F (24 °C) • Wind: NE at 5 miles per hour (8.0 km/h)
- Game attendance: 3,571
- Referee: Bruce Austin
- TV announcers (ESPN+): Jim Noble (play-by-play), Thom Henson (analyst) and Van Hipp (sideline)

Game information

First Quarter

- (11:26) WOF – Ihson Jackson-Anderson 49-yard pass from Jayden Whitaker, Blake Shirley pass (Drive: 4 plays, 57 yards, 1:50; Wofford 8–0)
- (5:29) WCU – James Tyre 2-yard pass from Taron Dickens, Marcus Trout kick (Drive: 14 plays, 85 yards, 5:52; Wofford 8–7)

Second Quarter

- (3:40) WCU – James Tyre 5-yard pass from Taron Dickens, Marcus Trout kick (Drive: 13 plays, 73 yards, 6:07; Western Carolina 14–8)
- (0:48) WOF – Isaiah Scott 66-yard punt return, Sam Spence kick (Wofford 15–14)

Third Quarter

- (0:45) WCU – James Tyre 4-yard pass from Taron Dickens (Drive: 11 plays, 78 yards, 5:06; Western Carolina 20–15)
- (0:29) WOF – Ivory Aikens 83-yard pass from Jayden Whitaker (Drive: 1 play, 83 yards, 0:12; Wofford 21–20)

Fourth Quarter

- (0:23) WCU – Marcus Trout 34-yard field goal (Drive: 16 plays, 51 yards, 4:40; Western Carolina 23–21)

Statistics	WCU	WOF
First downs	31	8
Total yards	471	241
Rushing yards	93	42
Passing yards	378	209
Passing: Comp–Att–Int	53–56–0	10–18–0
Time of possession	38:46	21:14

Team	Category	Player	Statistics
Western Carolina	Passing	Taron Dickens	53/56, 378 yards, 3 TD
Western Carolina	Rushing	Taron Dickens	19 carries, 44 yards
Western Carolina	Receiving	James Tyre	13 receptions, 102 yards, 3 TD
Wofford	Passing	Jayden Whitaker	10/18, 209 yards, 2 TD
Wofford	Rushing	Ihson Jackson-Anderson	10 carries, 29 yards
Wofford	Receiving	Ivory Aikens	3 receptions, 97 yards, TD

=== Furman ===
Furman Paladins (4-1) vs. Western Carolina Catamounts (3-3) – Game summary

Quarter	1	2	3	4	Total
Paladins	0	7	0	0	7
Catamounts	0	24	14	14	52

at Bob Waters Field at E. J. Whitmire Stadium • Cullowhee, NC

- Date: October 11
- Game time: 2:30 p.m. EDT
- Game weather: Cloudy • Temperature: 70 °F (21 °C) • Wind: N at 5 miles per hour (8.0 km/h)
- Game attendance: 8,375
- Referee: Michael Farmer
- TV announcers (ESPN+): Pete Yanity (play-by-play) and Jay Sonnhalter (analyst)

Game information

First Quarter

No scoring plays

Second Quarter

- (14:23) WCU – Marcus Trout 44-yard field goal (Drive: 7 plays, 18 yards, 2:03; Western Carolina 3–0)
- (10:05) WCU – Michael Rossin 50-yard pass from Taron Dickens, Marcus Trout kick (Drive: 7 plays, 80 yards, 2:18; Western Carolina 10–0)
- (7:39) WCU – Joshua Perry 9-yard pass from Taron Dickens, Marcus Trout kick (Drive: 4 plays, 28 yards, 1:42; Western Carolina 17–0)
- (1:38) WCU – Ken Moore Jr. 64-yard interception, Marcus Trout kick (Western Carolina 24–0)
- (0:13) FUR – Joshua Burrell 8-yard pass from Trey Hedden, Ian Williams kick (Drive: 10 plays, 75 yards, 1:25; Western Carolina 24–7)

Third Quarter

- (13:24) WCU – Malik Knight 41-yard pass from Taron Dickens, Marcus Trout kick (Drive: 5 plays, 75 yards, 1:36; Western Carolina 31–7)
- (5:25) WCU – Markel Townsend 12-yard run, Marcus Trout kick (Drive: 12 plays, 80 yards, 4:55; Western Carolina 38–7)

Fourth Quarter

- (9:35) WCU – Josiah Thomas 6-yard pass from Taron Dickens, Marcus Trout kick (Drive: 9 plays, 83 yards, 4:29; Western Carolina 45–7)
- (6:20) WCU – Isaac Lee 66-yard run, Marcus Trout kick (Drive: 3 plays, 65 yards, 1:28; Western Carolina 52–7)

Statistics	FUR	WCU
First downs	23	23
Total yards	356	522
Rushing yards	137	302
Passing yards	219	220
Passing: Comp–Att–Int	19–38–3	17–24–0
Time of possession	30:16	29:44

Team	Category	Player	Statistics
Furman	Passing	Trey Hedden	18/35, 208 yards, TD, 3 INT
Furman	Rushing	Ben Croasdale	6 carries, 72 yards
Furman	Receiving	Ethan Harris	6 receptions, 95 yards
Western Carolina	Passing	Taron Dickens	17/24, 220 yards, 4 TD
Western Carolina	Rushing	Patrick Boyd Jr.	11 carries, 68 yards
Western Carolina	Receiving	Michael Rossin	2 receptions, 59 yards, TD

=== at The Citadel ===
Western Carolina Catamounts (4-3) vs. The Citadel Bulldogs (3-3) – Game summary

Quarter	1	2	3	4	Total
Catamounts	7	17	14	7	45
Bulldogs	14	3	7	14	38

at Johnson Hagood Stadium • Charleston, SC

- Date: October 18
- Game time: 2:00 PM EDT
- Game weather: Sunny
- Game attendance: 9,151
- Referee: Bruce Austin
- TV announcers (ESPN+): Dave Weinstein (play-by-play), Vad Lee (analyst) and Matison Little (sideline)

Game information

First Quarter

- (11:23) CIT – Braylon Knauth 61-yard pass from Cobey Thompkins, Ben Barnes kick (Drive: 1 play, 61 yards, 0:13; The Citadel 7–0)
- (9:07) WCU – Malik Knight 14-yard pass from Taron Dickens, Marcus Trout kick (Drive: 6 plays, 65 yards, 2:10; Tied 7–7)
- (0:53) CIT – Quentin Hayes 5-yard run, Ben Barnes kick (Drive: 7 plays, 80 yards, 4:27; The Citadel 14–7)

Second Quarter

- (10:41) WCU – Josiah Thomas 5-yard pass from Taron Dickens, Marcus Trout kick (Drive: 11 plays, 70 yards, 5:03; Tied 14–14)
- (5:17) CIT – Ben Barnes 42-yard field goal (Drive: 4 plays, -4 yards, 2:01; The Citadel 17–14)
- (1:56) WCU – Markel Townsend 7-yard run, Marcus Trout kick (Drive: 8 plays, 75 yards, 3:21; Western Carolina 21–17)
- (0:00) WCU – Marcus Trout 25-yard field goal (Drive: 7 plays, 38 yards, 1:05; Western Carolina 24–17)

Third Quarter

- (11:35) WCU – James Tyre 9-yard pass from Taron Dickens, Marcus Trout kick (Drive: 7 plays, 73 yards, 3:19; Western Carolina 31–17)
- (5:31) CIT – Beau Herrington 12-yard run, Ben Barnes kick (Drive: 10 plays, 75 yards, 6:02; Western Carolina 31–24)
- (2:48) WCU – Malik Knight 37-yard pass from Taron Dickens, Marcus Trout kick (Drive: 6 plays, 51 yards, 2:36; Western Carolina 38–24)

Fourth Quarter

- (12:21) CIT – Quentin Hayes 8-yard run, Ben Barnes kick (Drive: 10 plays, 75 yards, 5:27; Western Carolina 38–31)
- (3:01) WCU – Dominic Dutton 18-yard pass from Taron Dickens, Marcus Trout kick (Drive: 10 plays, 87 yards, 4:57; Western Carolina 45–31)
- (1:36) CIT – Cobey Thompkins 20-yard run, Ben Barnes kick (Drive: 6 plays, 75 yards, 1:25; Western Carolina 45–38)

Statistics	WCU	CIT
First downs	29	15
Total yards	515	410
Rushing yards	146	278
Passing yards	369	132
Passing: Comp–Att–Int	28–33–1	5–9–0
Time of possession	29:44	30:16

Team	Category	Player	Statistics
Western Carolina	Passing	Taron Dickens	28/33, 369 yards, 5 TD, INT
Western Carolina	Rushing	Markel Townsend	15 carries, 90 yards, TD
Western Carolina	Receiving	James Tyre	7 receptions, 112 yards, TD
The Citadel	Passing	Cobey Thompkins	3/5, 111 yards, TD
The Citadel	Rushing	Quentin Hayes	15 carries, 90 yards, 2 TD
The Citadel	Receiving	Braylon Knauth	2 receptions, 69 yards, TD

=== at Chattanooga ===
Western Carolina Catamounts (5-3) vs. Chattanooga Mocs (4-4) – Game summary

Quarter	1	2	3	4	Total
Catamounts	7	14	7	7	35
Mocs	0	7	14	7	28

at Finley Stadium • Chattanooga, TN

- Date: November 1
- Game time: 4:00 PM EDT
- Game weather: Sunny • Temperature: 62 °F (17 °C) • Wind: E at 5 miles per hour (8.0 km/h)
- Game attendance: 7,711
- Referee: Michael Farmer
- TV announcers (ESPN+): Chris Goforth (play-by-play), Chris Barnett (analyst) and Mackenzie Johnson (sideline)

Game information

First Quarter

- (12:38) WCU – James Tyre 4-yard pass from Taron Dickens, Marcus Trout kick (Drive: 8 plays, 26 yards, 2:11; Western Carolina 7–0)

Second Quarter

- (8:38) WCU – James Tyre 7-yard pass from Taron Dickens, Marcus Trout kick (Drive: 9 plays, 45 yards, 3:39; Western Carolina 14–0)
- (5:25) UTC – Ryan Ingram 1-yard run, Gray Kelley kick (Drive: 8 plays, 70 yards, 3:08; Western Carolina 14–7)
- (2:49) WCU – James Tyre 13-yard pass from Taron Dickens, Marcus Trout kick (Drive: 8 plays, 54 yards, 2:29; Western Carolina 21–7)

Third Quarter

- (9:21) UTC – Nathaniel Eberly-Rodriguez 4-yard pass from Camden Orth, Gray Kelley kick (Drive: 11 plays, 75 yards, 5:39; Western Carolina 21–14)
- (2:18) UTC – Camden Orth 4-yard run, Gray Kelley kick (Drive: 7 plays, 50 yards, 3:14; Tied 21–21)
- (0:20) WCU – Markel Townsend 2-yard run, Marcus Trout kick (Drive: 5 plays, 70 yards, 1:53; Western Carolina 28–21)

Fourth Quarter

- (9:26) WCU – Michael Rossin 10-yard pass from Taron Dickens, Marcus Trout kick (Drive: 8 plays, 66 yards, 2:56; Western Carolina 35–21)
- (7:40) UTC – Justus Durant 8-yard run, Gray Kelley kick (Drive: 3 plays, 75 yards, 1:46; Western Carolina 35–28)

Statistics	WCU	UTC
First downs	22	25
Total yards	356	399
Rushing yards	131	158
Passing yards	225	241
Passing: Comp–Att–Int	18–29–0	15–27–2
Time of possession	22:40	37:20

Team	Category	Player	Statistics
Western Carolina	Passing	Taron Dickens	18/29, 225 yards, 4 TD
Western Carolina	Rushing	Patrick Boyd Jr.	12 carries, 67 yards
Western Carolina	Receiving	James Tyre	5 receptions, 45 yards, 3 TD
Chattanooga	Passing	Camden Orth	15/27, 241 yards, TD, 2 INT
Chattanooga	Rushing	Ryan Ingram	15 carries, 60 yards, TD
Chattanooga	Receiving	Markell Quick	3 receptions, 126 yards

=== No. 12 Mercer ===
No. 12 Mercer Bears (7-1) vs. No. 24 Western Carolina Catamounts (6-3) – Game summary

Quarter	1	2	3	4	Total
No. 12 Bears	7	11	21	10	49
No. 24 Catamounts	7	14	6	20	47

at Bob Waters Field at E. J. Whitmire Stadium • Cullowhee, NC

- Date: November 8
- Game time: 2:30 PM EST
- Game weather: Cloudy • Temperature: 65 °F (18 °C) • Wind: NW at 5 miles per hour (8.0 km/h)
- Game attendance: 14,510
- Referee: Jake Grombach
- TV announcers (ESPN+): Daniel Hooker (play-by-play) and John Brannon III (analyst)
- Box Score

Game information

First Quarter

- (11:40) WCU – Michael Rossin 27-yard pass from Taron Dickens, Marcus Trout kick (Drive: 9 plays, 65 yards, 3:20; Western Carolina 7–0)
- (3:31) MER – CJ Miller 7-yard run, Reice Griffith kick (Drive: 5 plays, 68 yards, 2:24; Tied 7–7)

Second Quarter

- (14:55) WCU – Patrick Boyd Jr. 21-yard pass from Taron Dickens, Marcus Trout kick (Drive: 6 plays, 54 yards, 1:36; Western Carolina 14–7)
- (13:06) MER – Jordan Swain safety (Western Carolina 14–9)
- (10:18) MER – Kendall Harris 6-yard pass from Braden Atkinson (Drive: 7 plays, 69 yards, 2:42; Mercer 15–14)
- (5:25) WCU – Michael Rossin 25-yard pass from Taron Dickens, Marcus Trout kick (Drive: 11 plays, 79 yards, 4:48; Western Carolina 21–15)
- (1:43) MER – Reice Griffith 24-yard field goal (Drive: 10 plays, 68 yards, 3:42; Western Carolina 21–18)

Third Quarter

- (12:09) MER – CJ Miller 5-yard run, Reice Griffith kick (Drive: 5 plays, 75 yards, 2:51; Mercer 25–21)
- (5:12) MER – Kendall Harris 24-yard pass from Braden Atkinson, Reice Griffith kick (Drive: 4 plays, 35 yards, 1:31; Mercer 32–21)
- (2:56) WCU – Malik Knight 32-yard pass from Taron Dickens (Drive: 6 plays, 75 yards, 2:16; Mercer 32–27)
- (0:24) MER – CJ Miller 26-yard run, Reice Griffith kick (Drive: 6 plays, 75 yards, 2:32; Mercer 39–27)

Fourth Quarter

- (14:28) WCU – Malik Knight 54-yard pass from Taron Dickens, Marcus Trout kick (Drive: 3 plays, 64 yards, 0:49; Mercer 39–34)
- (13:24) MER – Adjatay Dabbs 81-yard pass from Braden Atkinson, Reice Griffith kick (Drive: 3 plays, 82 yards, 0:58; Mercer 46–34)
- (6:13) WCU – Jai Boyd 10-yard pass from Taron Dickens, Marcus Trout kick (Drive: 8 plays, 73 yards, 2:43; Mercer 46–41)
- (3:13) WCU – James Tyre 42-yard pass from Taron Dickens (Drive: 3 plays, 82 yards, 1:23; Western Carolina 47–46)
- (1:30) MER – Reice Griffith 37-yard field goal (Drive: 6 plays, 45 yards, 1:43; Mercer 49–47)

Statistics	MER	WCU
First downs	23	33
Total yards	568	599
Rushing yards	125	48
Passing yards	443	551
Passing: Comp–Att–Int	23–39–0	33–49–1
Time of possession	30:32	29:28

Team	Category	Player	Statistics
Mercer	Passing	Braden Atkinson	23/39, 443 yards, 3 TD
Mercer	Rushing	CJ Miller	21 carries, 91 yards, 3 TD
Mercer	Receiving	Adjatay Dabbs	4 receptions, 147 yards, TD
Western Carolina	Passing	Taron Dickens	33/49, 551 yards, 7 TD, INT
Western Carolina	Rushing	Patrick Boyd Jr.	12 carries, 17 yards
Western Carolina	Receiving	Malik Knight	5 receptions, 141 yards, 2 TD

=== East Tennessee State ===
East Tennessee State Buccaneers (5-5) vs. No. 25 Western Carolina Catamounts (6-4) – Game summary

Quarter	1	2	3	4	Total
Buccaneers	10	14	14	14	52
No. 25 Catamounts	0	28	7	0	35

at Bob Waters Field at E. J. Whitmire Stadium • Cullowhee, NC

- Date: November 15
- Game time: 12:00 PM EST
- Game weather: Clear • Temperature: 60 °F (16 °C) • Wind: NW at 4 miles per hour (6.4 km/h)
- Game attendance: 10,543
- Referee: Brice Austin
- TV announcers (ESPN+): Pete Yanity (play-by-play), Jay Sonnhalter (analyst) and Dave Friedman (sideline)

Game information

First Quarter

- (10:30) ETSU – Ewan Johnson 21-yard field goal (Drive: 12 plays, 71 yards, 4:30; East Tennessee State 3–0)
- (4:26) ETSU – Jeremiah Harrison 38-yard pass from Jacolby Criswell, Ewan Johnson kick (Drive: 4 plays, 63 yards, 1:48; East Tennessee State 10–0)

Second Quarter

- (14:56) WCU – Jordan Durham-Martin 1-yard run, Marcus Trout kick (Drive: 14 plays, 74 yards, 4:25; East Tennessee State 10–7)
- (8:36) WCU – Markel Townsend 1-yard run, Marcus Trout kick (Drive: 9 plays, 71 yards, 3:10; Western Carolina 14–10)
- (7:11) WCU – Cam'Ron Dabney 43-yard fumble recovery, Marcus Trout kick (Western Carolina 21–10)
- (5:22) ETSU – Hakeem Meggett 38-yard pass from Jacolby Criswell, Ewan Johnson kick (Drive: 5 plays, 75 yards, 1:49; Western Carolina 21–17)
- (3:22) WCU – Jaylin Terzado 58-yard pass from Taron Dickens, Marcus Trout kick (Drive: 5 plays, 75 yards, 1:54; Western Carolina 28–17)
- (0:23) ETSU – Cole Keller 6-yard pass from Jacolby Criswell, Ewan Johnson kick (Drive: 12 plays, 75 yards, 2:59; Western Carolina 28–24)

Third Quarter

- (8:45) ETSU – Ephraim Floyd 5-yard pass from Jackson Byrd, Ewan Johnson kick (Drive: 9 plays, 63 yards, 3:42; East Tennessee State 31–28)
- (2:08) WCU – Michael Rossin 61-yard pass from Taron Dickens, Marcus Trout kick (Drive: 4 plays, 79 yards, 1:29; Western Carolina 35–31)
- (1:04) ETSU – Hakeem Meggett 42-yard pass from Jackson Byrd, Ewan Johnson kick (Drive: 3 plays, 75 yards, 1:04; East Tennessee State 38–35)

Fourth Quarter

- (14:59) ETSU – Jason Albritton 1-yard run, Ewan Johnson kick (Drive: 2 plays, 5 yards, 0:06; East Tennessee State 45–35)
- (2:18) ETSU – Jeremiah Harrison 32-yard pass from Jackson Byrd, Ewan Johnson kick (Drive: 10 plays, 99 yards, 3:33; East Tennessee State 52–35)

Statistics	ETSU	WCU
First downs	33	25
Total yards	638	529
Rushing yards	244	103
Passing yards	394	426
Passing: Comp–Att–Int	22–37–0	33–48–0
Time of possession	30:35	29:25

Team	Category	Player	Statistics
East Tennessee State	Passing	Jacolby Criswell	17/29, 271 yards, 3 TD
East Tennessee State	Rushing	Jason Albritton	20 carries, 125 yards, TD
East Tennessee State	Receiving	Jeremiah Harrison	5 receptions, 139 yards, 2 TD
Western Carolina	Passing	Taron Dickens	33/48, 426 yards, 2 TD
Western Carolina	Rushing	Taron Dickens	11 carries, 48 yards
Western Carolina	Receiving	Michael Rossin	4 receptions, 89 yards, TD

=== at VMI ===
Western Carolina Catamounts (0-0) vs. VMI Keydets (0-0) – Game summary

Quarter	1	2	3	4	Total
Catamounts	-	-	-	-	0
Keydets	-	-	-	-	0

at Alumni Memorial Field • Lexington, VA

- Date: November 22

Statistics	WCU	VMI
First downs		
Total yards		
Rushing yards		
Passing yards		
Passing: Comp–Att–Int		
Time of possession		

Team	Category	Player	Statistics
Western Carolina	Passing		
Western Carolina	Rushing		
Western Carolina	Receiving		
VMI	Passing		
VMI	Rushing		
VMI	Receiving		

== Roster ==
2025 Western Carolina Catamounts football team roster
Players
Coaches
Offense

Pos.	#	Name	Class
WR	0	AJ Colombo	Sr
WR	1	Patrick Boyd Jr.	So
RB	2	Branson Adams	Sr
WR	3	Kha'leal Sterling	Fr
WR	4	Dominic Dutton	Sr
QB	5	Taron Dickens	So
WR	6	Marcus Striggles	So
WR	7	Malik Knight	Jr
WR	5	Painter Richards-Baker	Sr
WR	9	Jaylin Terzado	Jr
WR	10	Michael Rossin	Fr
QB	11	Isaac Lee	Fr
QB	12	Jack Benson	Jr
WR	13	Richard Hollis	Fr
TE	14	Josiah Thomas	Fr
WR	15	Jai Boyd	So
WR	16	James Tyre	So
QB	17	Bennett Judy	So
QB	18	Jordan Martin-Durham	Fr
TE	19	Bode Burns	Fr
RB	20	Camury Reid	Jr
RB	21	Jaiden Bond	Sr
RB	22	Josh Perry	Fr
RB	24	Anthony Benjamin	So
WR	25	Noah Best	Fr
RB	28	Markel Townsend	So
TE	44	Isaac McLellan	Jr
TE	48	Cole Craddock	Fr
OL	50	Jarvis Adams Jr.	Fr
OL	51	Aaron Sanez	Jr
OL	52	Manasseh Ripert	Jr
OL	53	Zach Watson	So
OL	55	Secrea Algie	Fr
OL	58	Brett Gray	Sr
OL	64	Konrad Henderson	Fr
OL	65	Nicholas Foster	Fr
OL	66	John Hammond	Fr
OL	67	Steven Hamby	So
OL	68	Aidan Cooper	Fr
OL	69	Cole Cooke	Fr
OL	70	Dale Greene	Fr
OL	74	Elijah Collins	So
OL	75	Renard Smith	So
OL	77	Ilija Krajnovic	Sr
OL	78	Evan Carney	So
OL	79	Vito Moriana-Sigel	Jr
WR	80	Trey Walker	Fr
WR	81	Ca'Lique Cunningham	Jr
WR	82	Matthew Keener	Fr
WR	83	Austin Cunningham	Fr
TE	85	David Hulbert	So
TE	86	Brayden Blackmon	Sr
WR	87	Eli Griffin	Fr
WR	88	Jemarious Reaves	Fr
WR	89	Ellis Chappell	Fr
RB		Marlin Cochran	So
QB		Ian Grissom	Fr
QB		Tate Rodemaker	Sr

Defense

Pos.	#	Name	Class
NB	0	Ken Moore Jr.	Jr
DE	1	Caleb Fisher	Sr
DE	2	Micah Nelson	Sr
S	3	Samaurie Dukes	Sr
LB	4	Jordan Thompson	So
LB	5	Hayward McQueen Jr.	Sr
DB	6	Bo Simpson-Nealy	So
S	7	Ed Jones IV	Sr
DT	8	Jahleel Anderson	Sr
CB	9	Darian Anderson Jr.	Jr
DE	10	Justin Wallace	Jr
DE	11	Kenyon Partridge	So
CB	12	Hasaan Sykes	So
CB	13	Marseille Taylor	Jr
DT	14	Vanier Baptiste III	Fr
DE	15	Gavin Rowell	Jr
S	16	Jhamari Pierre-Louis	Jr
LB	17	Armond Anderson	Sr
LB	18	Ryan McKinnis	So
CB	19	Cam Smith	So
S	20	Na'koma Simpson-Nealy	Fr
CB	21	Cam'Ron Dabney	Sr
NB	22	Jeno Junius Jr.	So
S	24	Zayveon Wells	So
NB	25	Nas Ashenafi	Fr
NB	26	Devin Brown	Fr
CB	27	Jayden Cornelius	Fr
CB	29	Christian Robbins	Fr
DE	30	Richard Garrett	Jr
CB	31	Don Robinson III	Jr
S	32	AJ Mintze	Fr
S	33	Lee Campbell	Jr
LB	34	Joshua Collins	Fr
LB	35	Trey Berry III	Fr
NB	36	Ja'Morri Downing	Jr
CB	37	Chris Hobbs	Fr
CB	38	Canden McGill	Fr
S	39	Julian Quintero	Fr
DE	40	Cain Jefferson	Fr
LB	41	Beady Waddell V	Fr
LB	42	Hank Bodine	Fr
LB	43	Braeden Barger	Fr
DT	45	Sean Morris	Sr
LB	46	Nolan McClanahan	Fr
LB	47	Blue Monroe	Jr
LB	49	Bryce Hart	Fr
DT	57	Jeremy Johnson	Fr
DT	59	J'evon Bush	Fr
DL	90	Jamichael Wilson	GS
DT	91	Jackson Banks	So
DT	92	Brandon Joseph II	Fr
DT	93	Adrian Stone	Fr
DT	94	Jaden Meeks	Fr
DT	97	Caleb Bradford	Sr
DT	98	Jackson Hensley	Fr
DE	99	Jordan Cardentey	Fr
DB		Trevaughn Martinez	So

Special teams

Pos.	#	Name	Class
LS	56	Mabry Bumgarner	So
K	60	Marcus Trout	Fr
K	61	Bryan McCollum	Fr
LS	62	Emmett Rhoades	So
P	63	Thomas Guerrero	Fr
P	95	Stephen Brantley	Jr
K	96	Christian Lowery	Sr

Head coach

- Kerwin Bell

Coordinators/assistant coaches

- Jerry Odom – Defensive coordinator
- Rylan Wells – Offensive coordinator/recruiting coordinator
- Kerry Webb – Special teams coordinator
- Brian Cochran – Defensive line
- Kyle Dickey – Tight ends
- Malik Goodman – Safeties
- Ethan Harris – Cornerbacks
- Corey Headley – Quarterbacks/director of player personnel
- Jeremy King – Offensive line
- Greg McGruder – Wide receivers
- Rudi Small – Running backs

Legend

- (C) Team captain
- (S) Suspended
- (I) Ineligible
- Injured
- Redshirt

Roster
Last update: July 29, 2025
