= Mike Yeager =

American football coach (born 1977)

Current position
- Title: Defensive coordinator / inside linebackers coach
- Team: Chattanooga
- Conference: Southern

Biographical details
- Born: May 18, 1977 (age 49); Cincinnati, Ohio, U.S.

Playing career
- 1997–1999: Miami (OH)
- Position: Linebacker

Coaching career (HC unless noted)
- 2000–2002: Wooster (assistant)
- 2003–2004: Wooster (DC)
- 2005: Indiana (GA)
- 2006–2008: Indiana (S)
- 2009–2010: Indiana (LB)
- 2011–2012: Carthage (DC)
- 2012–2017: Carthage
- 2018: Tiffin (DC)
- 2019–2023: Chattanooga (ST/ILB)
- 2024–present: Chattanooga (DC/ILB)

Head coaching record
- Overall: 23–30

Mike Yeager (born May 18, 1977) is an American football coach. He is the defensive coordinator at Chattanooga. He served as the head football coach at Carthage College in Kenosha, Wisconsin from 2012 to 2017. He has held that position after taking over with three games remaining in the 2012 season and was retained as head coach for the next season. Before being named head coach at Carthage, he was assistant coach and defensive coordinator for the program.

== Head coaching record ==
Year	Team	Overall	Conference	Standing	Bowl/playoffs
Carthage Red Men (College Conference of Illinois and Wisconsin) (2012–2017)
2012	Carthage	0–3	0–3	7th	
2013	Carthage	1–9	0–7	8th	
2014	Carthage	3–7	2–5	T–5th	
2015	Carthage	5–5	4–3	T–3rd	
2016	Carthage	7–3	5–3	4th	
2017	Carthage	7–3	5–3	T–4th	
Carthage:		23–30	16–24		
Total:		23–30			
