= 2024 Ole Miss Rebels football team =

American college football season

2024 Ole Miss Rebels football

Gator Bowl champion

Gator Bowl, W 52–20 vs. Duke
- Conference: Southeastern Conference

Ranking
- Coaches: No. 13
- AP: No. 11
- Record: 10–3 (5–3 SEC)
- Head coach: Lane Kiffin (5th season)
- Offensive coordinator: Charlie Weis Jr. (3rd season)
- Co-offensive coordinator: Joe Cox (1st season)
- Offensive scheme: Veer and shoot
- Defensive coordinator: Pete Golding (2nd season)
- Co-defensive coordinator: Bryan Brown (1st season)
- Base defense: 3–4
- Home stadium: Vaught–Hemingway Stadium (Capacity 64,038)

Uniform
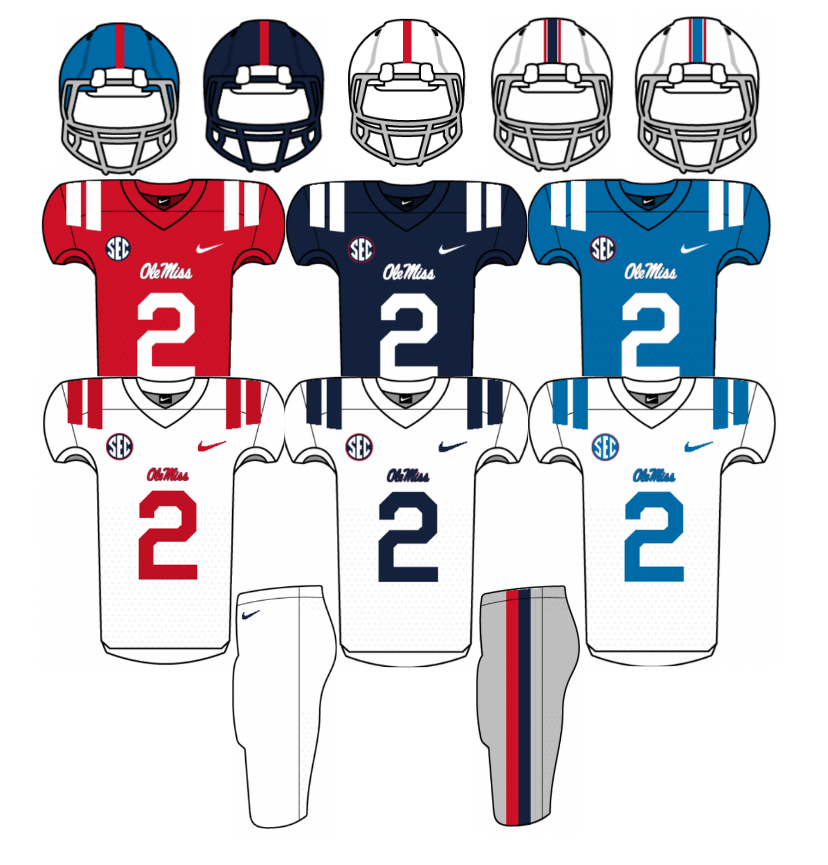

2024 Southeastern Conference football standings
	Conf.			Overall
Team	W		L	W		L
No. 4 Texas y^	7	–	1	13	–	3
No. 6 Georgia y$^	6	–	2	11	–	3
No. 9 Tennessee ^	6	–	2	10	–	3
No. 22 Missouri	5	–	3	10	–	3
No. 11 Ole Miss	5	–	3	10	–	3
No. 17 Alabama	5	–	3	9	–	4
No. 19 South Carolina	5	–	3	9	–	4
LSU	5	–	3	9	–	4
Texas A&M	5	–	3	8	–	5
Florida	4	–	4	8	–	5
Arkansas	3	–	5	7	–	6
Vanderbilt	3	–	5	7	–	6
Oklahoma	2	–	6	6	–	7
Auburn	2	–	6	5	–	7
Kentucky	1	–	7	4	–	8
Mississippi State	0	–	8	2	–	10
Championship: Georgia 22, Texas 19 ^{OT}
^ – College Football Playoff participant; $ – Conference champion; y – Championship game participant; Rankings from AP Poll

The 2024 Ole Miss Rebels football team represented the University of Mississippi (Ole Miss) in the Southeastern Conference (SEC) during the 2024 NCAA Division I FBS football season. The Rebels were led by fifth-year head coach Lane Kiffin. The team played its home games at Vaught–Hemingway Stadium in Oxford, Mississippi.

Expectations were high for the Rebels going into the 2024 season as they were coming off of a 2023 season in which they won Peach Bowl, went 11–2 on the season, and finished #9. They were #6 in the preseason polls and started out 4–0 before suffering a shocking 20–17 loss at home to unranked Kentucky. The next week, they rebounded by beating South Carolina 27–3 in Columbia, however the week after that, they lost 29–26 to #13 LSU in overtime despite the Tigers never having the lead during regulation. This loss caused the Rebels to fall to 5–2 and #18, but they rebounded with a home win over Oklahoma and a road win over Arkansas (the latter of which featured a record-setting performance from Jaxson Dart in which he threw for 515 yards and 6 touchdowns in a 63–31 rout of the Razorbacks). Following those wins, they were 7–2 and returned home to face the #3 Georgia Bulldogs, whose only loss was to Alabama in Tuscaloosa. In front of a then-record crowd of 68,126, Ole Miss' defense dominated the game and the Rebels won 28–10, securing Lane Kiffin's first Top 5 win as Ole Miss' head coach. Fans stormed the field in celebration (although they had to be pushed back initially as they went on the field too early when 16 seconds were still on the clock) and they tore down the goalposts. This win helped Ole Miss keep their Playoff chances alive as they moved up to #11 in the College Football Playoff rankings. Additionally, Jaxson Dart became the winningest quarterback in program history. The Rebels were upset 24–17 by Florida on November 22 and fell to #14. They beat Mississippi State 26–14 in Jaxson Dart's final home game as a Rebel. They were not selected for the College Football Playoff, but they did receive an invite to the Gator Bowl, which they won 52–20 over Duke to finish 10–3. This was the first time since 1959–1960 that the Rebels had back-to-back 10-win seasons. Jaxson Dart would go on to be selected to the All-SEC First Team.

== Offseason ==
=== NFL draft ===
Three Rebels were selected in the 2024 NFL draft.

Player	Position	Team	Round	Pick
Deantre Prince	DB	Jacksonville Jaguars	5	153
Cedric Johnson	DE	Cincinnati Bengals	6	214
Daijahn Anthony	DB	Cincinnati Bengals	7	224

=== Transfers ===
==== Outgoing ====
Player	Position	Destination
Deljay Bailey	QB	Grambling State
Bralon Brown	WR	Marshall
Jayvontay Conner	TE	East Carolina
Caden Costa	K	Memphis
Jeremiah Dillon	WR	Vanderbilt
Zakhari Franklin	WR	Illinois
Jam Griffin	RB	Oregon State
Joshua Harris	DL	North Carolina
Kyirin Heath	TE	Southern Miss
Reginald Hughes	EDGE	Jacksonville State
JJ Henry	WR	Abilene Christian
Quinshon Judkins	RB	Ohio State
Skielar Mann	LB	Mississippi Gulf Coast CC
Cedric Melton	OT	Houston
Daniel Newman	S	Unknown
Cedrick Nicely	IOL	Marshall
Kedrick Reescano	RB	Arizona
Myles Saulsberry	DT	Mississippi Gulf Coast CC
Larry Simmons	WR	Southern Miss
Demarcus Smith	DL	UAB
Ladarius Tennison	S	UCF
Michael Trigg	TE	Baylor
Rayf Vinson	S	Samford
Amorion Walker	WR	Michigan
Demarko Williams	S	Western Kentucky
Davin Wydner	QB	West Georgia
Isheem Young	S	North Texas

==== Incoming ====
Player	Position	Previous School
Rashad Amos	RB	Miami (OH)
Trey Amos	CB	Alabama
Yam Banks	CB	South Alabama
Julius Buelow	OT	Washington
Jacory Croskey-Merritt	RB	New Mexico
Micah Davis	WR	Utah State
Logan Diggs	RB	LSU
Rodney Groce Jr.	LB	UTSA
Isaiah Hamilton	CB	Houston
Nate Kalepo	OT	Washington
Key Lawrence	S	Oklahoma
Tamarion McDonald	S	Tennessee
Louis Moore	S	Indiana
Walter Nolen	DL	Texas A&M
Henry Parrish Jr.	RB	Miami (FL)
Chris Paul Jr.	LB	Arkansas
Diego Pounds	OT	North Carolina
Devin Price	WR	Florida Atlantic
Gerquan Scott	IOL	Southern Miss
Domonique Thomas	RB	Georgia State
Brandon Turnage	S	Tennessee
Princely Umanmielen	EDGE	Florida
Amorion Walker	CB	Michigan
Juice Wells	WR	South Carolina
Dae'Quan Wright	TE	Virginia Tech

== Preseason ==
The SEC media poll was released on July 19, 2024. The Rebels were predicted to finish fourth in the conference.

== Roster ==
2024 Ole Miss Rebels Football
Quarterbacks: 2 – Jaxson Dart – Senior (6'2, 225) – Kaysville, Utah; 7 – Walker Howard – Sophomore (6'0, 190) – Lafayette, Louisiana; 13 – Austin Simmons – Freshman (6'4, 215) – Pinecrest, Florida; 15 – AJ Maddox – Freshman (6'1, 185) – Hattiesburg, Mississippi; 16 – Justin Kowalak – Sophomore (6'0, 205) – Crystal Lake, Illinois; 16 – Braden Waterman – Sophomore (6'3, 200) – Bakersfield, California; Running backs: 0 – Matt Jones – Junior (5'7, 200) – Jackson, Mississippi; 21 – Henry Parrish Jr. – Senior (5'10, 185) – Goulds, Florida; 22 – Logan Diggs – Senior (6'1, 215) – Boutte, Louisiana; 24 – Ulysses Bentley IV – Senior (5'10, 200) – Houston, Texas; 26 – Domonique Thomas – Senior (5'9, 210) – Ohatchee, Alabama; 33 – Rashad Amos – Senior (6'1, 235) – Fayetteville, Georgia (Georgia (U.S. state)); 35 – Raphael Ekechi – Junior (5'10, 195) – Tampa, Florida; 37 – Austin Acton – Freshman (5'11, 200) – Meridian, Mississippi; 40 – Jason Albritton – Sophomore (5'9, 220) – Lithia, Florida; 44 – Ali Scott – Junior (5'10, 220) – Powder Springs, Georgia (Georgia (U.S. state)); Wide receivers: 1 – Ayden Williams – Sophomore (6'3, 205) – Ridgeland, Mississippi; 3 – Juice Wells – Junior (6'0, 205) – Richmond, Virginia; 4 – Micah Davis – Senior (5'11, 185) – Atlanta, Georgia (Georgia (U.S. state)); 9 – Tre Harris – Senior (6'3, 210) – Lafayette, Louisiana; 11 – Jordan Watkins – Senior (5'11, 200) – Louisville, Kentucky; 14 – Izaiah Hartrup – Senior (6'0, 180) – O'Fallon, Missouri; 17 – Devin Price – Senior (6'3, 195) – College Station, Texas; 19 – Cayden Lee – Sophomore (5'11, 175) – Kennesaw, Georgia (Georgia (U.S. state)); 20 – Joshua Aka – Senior (5'9, 185) – Starkville, Mississippi; 23 – Drew Burnett – Sophomore (6'1, 190) – Memphis, Tennessee; 31 – Calvin Wilson – Junior (6'1, 195) – Thompson's Station, Tennessee; 32 – Torian Kelly – Junior (5'11, 175) – Ocean Springs, Mississippi; 39 – Ciaran Pedulla – Freshman (6'3, 205) – Edmond, Oklahoma; 43 – Dylan Davis – Redshirt Freshman (6'0, 180) – Frisco, Texas; 81 – Noreel White – Freshman (6'1, 185) – Moss Point, Mississippi; 83 – Jarnorris Hopson – Junior (5'10, 200) – Tunica, Mississippi; 84 – Mac Owen – Sophomore (6'0, 185) – Tunica, Mississippi; 85 – Joshua Pfeifer – Junior (6'1, 185) – Nashville, Tennessee; 89 – Jordan Smart – Senior (5'10, 185) – Round Rock, Texas; Tight ends: 8 – Dae'Quan Wright – Junior (6'4, 255) – Perry, Georgia (Georgia (U.S. state)); 42 – Jack Harper – Freshman (6'5, 240) – Oxford, Mississippi; 45 – Sean Judge – Freshman (6'5, 220) – Attleboro, Massachusetts; 46 – Salathiel Hemphill – Senior (6'3, 250) – Winona, Mississippi; 47 – Wyatt Smalley – Freshman (6'3, 215) – Milton, Georgia (Georgia (U.S. state)); 86 – Caden Prieskorn – Senior (6'6, 255) – Lake Orion, Michigan; 87 – Hudson Wolfe – Junior (6'6, 245) – Savannah, Tennessee; 88 – Dillon Hipp – Freshman (6'5, 240) – Scottsdale, Arizona; Kicker/Punter: 12 – Fraser Masin – Senior (6'4, 230) – Brisbane, Australia; 41 – Caden Davis – Senior (6'2, 210) – Coppell, Texas; 45 – Mike Baker – Freshman (5'9, 180) – Wilmette, Illinois; 48 – Charlie Pollock – Junior (6'1, 250) – Marietta, Georgia (Georgia (U.S. state)); Long snappers: 93 – Carter Short – Junior (5'9, 195) – Hoover, Alabama; 94 – Caleb Blankenship – Freshman (6'2, 220) – Ashdown, Arkansas	Offensive Lineman: 50 – Jayden Williams – Junior (6'4, 315) – Conway, Arkansas; 51 – Trey Nightingale – Freshman (6'2, 270) – Wyckoff, New Jersey; 52 – Julius Buelow – Senior (6'8, 320) – Kapolei, Hawaiʻi (Hawaii); 53 – Joe Koury – Freshman (6'1, 290) – Madison, Mississippi; 54 – Caleb Warren – Senior (6'5, 305) – Louisville, Mississippi; 55 – Preston Cushman – Sophomore (6'5, 305) – St. Petersburg, Florida; 56 – Reece McIntyre – Senior (6'5, 320) – Buford, Georgia (Georgia (U.S. state)); 57 – Micah Pettus – Junior (6'7, 350) – Madison, Alabama; 58 – Jude Foster – Freshman (6'4, 305) – Baton Rouge, Louisiana; 59 – Mana Taimani – Senior (6'4, 345) – Antioch, California; 60 – Lane Hewett – Freshman (6'1, 320) – Ocean Springs, Mississippi; 61 – Diego Pounds – Junior (6'6, 340) – Raleigh, North Carolina; 62 – Brycen Sanders – Freshman (6'6, 310) – Chattanooga, Tennessee; 65 – Gerquan Scott – Senior (6'3, 320) – Mobile, Alabama; 68 – Jack Mills – Sophomore (6'4, 320) – Medfield, Massachusetts; 71 – Nate Kalepo – Senior (6'6, 335) – Renton, Washington (Washington (state)); 72 – Ethan Fields – Freshman (6'3, 320) – Geismar, Louisiana; 73 – Eli Acker – Senior (6'5, 300) – Columbus, Mississippi; 75 – Kavion Broussard – Freshman (6'6, 290) – New Iberia, Louisiana; 76 – John Wayne Oliver – Freshman (6'5, 295) – Nashville, Tennessee; 77 – Cam East – Sophomore (6'7, 320) – Marrero, Louisiana; 78 – Jeremy James – Senior (6'6, 335) – Cumming, Georgia (Georgia (U.S. state)); Defensive Lineman: 1 – Princely Umanmielen – Senior (6'4, 255) – Manor, Texas; 2 – Walter Nolen – Junior (6'3, 305) – Powell, Tennessee; 14 – Kam Franklin – Freshman (6'5, 275) – Lake Cormorant, Mississippi; 15 – Jared Ivey – Senior (6'6, 285) – Suwanee, Georgia (Georgia (U.S. state)); 35 – Cam Clark – Freshman (6'3, 250) – Medina, Tennessee; 38 – JJ Pegues – Senior (6'2, 325) – Oxford, Mississippi; 47 – DeeJay Holmes Jr. – Freshman (6'0, 245) – Pahokee, Florida; 51 – Zxavian Harris – Junior (6'7, 320) – Canton, Mississippi; 52 – Will Echoles – Freshman (6'3, 310) – Houston, Mississippi; 55 – Lakendrick Clancy – Freshman (6'0, 280) – Northport, Alabama; 57 – Paris Evans – Freshman (6'3, 260) – Waynesboro, Mississippi; 90 – Jeffery Rush – Freshman (6'1, 265) – Pascagoula, Mississippi; 91 – Chris Hardie – Senior (6'2, 265) – Vincent, Alabama; 92 – Chamberlain Campbell – Freshman (6'6, 240) – St. Petersburg, Florida; 94 – Tavion Prather – Senior (6'3, 285) – Oxford, Mississippi; 95 – Akelo Stone – Senior (6'2, 285) – Savannah, Georgia (Georgia (U.S. state)); 96 – Jamarious Brown – Freshman (6'1, 315) – Moss Point, Mississippi; 97 – Kamron Beavers – Freshman (6'3, 255) – Bay Springs, Mississippi	Linebackers: 4 – Suntarine Perkins – Sophomore (6'1, 210) – Raleigh, Mississippi; 6 – TJ Dottery – Sophomore (6'1, 225) – Montgomery, Alabama; 11 – Chris Paul Jr. – Junior (6'1, 235) – Cordele, Georgia (Georgia (U.S. state)); 21 – Daniel Demery – Freshman (5'11, 205) – Flower Mound, Texas; 23 – Khari Coleman – Senior (6'1, 220) – New Orleans, Louisiana; 27 – Rodney Groce Jr. – Senior (6'0, 220) – Pleasant Grove, Alabama; 30 – Trip White – Sophomore (6'3, 220) – Little Rock, Arkansas; 34 – Tyler Banks – Junior (6'2, 245) – Blackstone, Virginia; 36 – Raymond Collins – Junior (6'1, 235) – Gulfport, Mississippi; 48 – Mark Trigg Jr. – Freshman (6'2, 200) – Roswell, Georgia (Georgia (U.S. state)); 56 – CJ Barney – Junior (6'1, 220) – Madison, Mississippi; Defensive backs: 3 – Isaiah Hamilton – Senior (6'1, 175) – Houston, Texas; 5 – John Saunders Jr. – Senior (6'2, 210) – High Point, North Carolina; 7 – Louis Moore – Senior (5'11, 200) – Mesquite, Texas; 8 – Brandon Turnage – Senior (6'1, 185) – Oxford, Mississippi; 9 – Trey Amos – Senior (6'1, 190) – New Iberia, Louisiana; 12 – Key Lawrence – Senior (6'0, 205) – Nashville, Tennessee; 13 – Cedrick Beavers – Junior (5'10, 175) – Taylorsville, Mississippi; 16 – Yam Banks – Senior (5'11, 210) – Ridgeland, Mississippi; 17 – Richard O'Bryant – Junior (5'9, 180) – Brandon, Mississippi; 19 – Travaris Banks – Freshman (6'1, 190) – Tuscaloosa, Alabama; 20 – Anthony Robinson III – Freshman (5'11, 195) – St. Rose, Louisiana; 22 – Jarell Stinson – Junior (5'9, 185) – Opelika, Alabama; 25 – Trey Washington – Senior (5'10, 205) – Trussville, Alabama; 26 – Katrevrick Banks – Freshman (6'2, 180) – Homer, Louisiana; 27 – Pat Broomfield – Freshman (6'1, 155) – Clarksdale, Mississippi; 28 – Jadon Canady – Junior (5'10, 175) – Jacksonville, Florida; 29 – Nick Cull – Sophomore (5'11, 180) – Donalsonville, Georgia (Georgia (U.S. state)); 31 – Antione Johnson – Senior (5'10, 200) – Louisville, Kentucky; 32 – Chris Graves – Sophomore (6'0, 185) – Fort Myers, Florida; 33 – Shamaar Darden – Freshman (6'1, 175) – Tupelo, Mississippi; 37 – AJ Brown – Sophomore (6'1, 195) – Cordele, Georgia (Georgia (U.S. state)); 39 – Zach Johansen – Sophomore (5'10, 205) – Suwanee, Georgia (Georgia (U.S. state)); 40 – Micah Stallworth – Freshman (5'11, 200) – Ridgeland, Mississippi; 41 – John Ross Ashley – Freshman (5'11, 180) – Vestavia Hills, Alabama; 42 – Andy Jaffe – Freshman (6'0, 185) – Tampa, Florida; 43 – Dylan Davis – Freshman (6'0, 180) – Frisco, Texas; 46 – Harrison Craig – Sophomore (5'11, 200) – Collierville, Tennessee
Legend: (C) Team captain; (S) Suspended; (I) Ineligible; Injured

=== Depth chart ===
Defense

FS
Trey Washington
Louis Moore
Antione Johnson

BUCK	SAM	WILL	NICKEL
Princely Umanmielen	Chris Paul Jr.	TJ Dottery	Louis Moore
Chris Hardie	Khari Coleman	Tyler Banks	Jadon Canady
Chamberlain Campbell	CJ Barney	Suntarine Perkins	Katrevrick Banks

SS
John Saunders Jr.
Yam Banks
Pat Broomfield

CB
Isaiah Hamilton
Brandon Turnage
TJ Banks

DE	NT	DE
Jared Ivey	Walter Nolen	Akelo Stone
Suntarine Perkins	Zxavian Harris	Tavion Prather
Kam Franklin	Jamarious Brown	Kam Franklin

CB
Trey Amos
Chris Graves Jr.
Anthony Robinson III

Offense

WR
Tre Harris
Juice Wells
Ayden Williams

WR
Jordan Watkins
Izaiah Hartrup
Noreel White

LT	LG	C	RG	RT
Jayden Williams	Nate Kalepo	Reece McIntyre	Julius Buelow	Micah Pettus
Diego Pounds	Caleb Warren	Gerquan Scott	Jeremy James	Preston Cushman
Cam East	Eli Acker	Brycen Sanders	Jack Mills	Mana Taimani

TE
Caden Prieskorn
Dae'Quan Wright
Hudson Wolfe

WR
Cayden Lee
Devin Price
Mac Owen

QB
Jaxson Dart
Austin Simmons
Walker Howard

RB
Henry Parrish Jr.
Ulysses Bentley IV
Matt Jones

Special teams
PK Caden Davis
P Fraser Masin

== Schedule ==
Ole Miss and the SEC announced the 2024 football schedule on December 13, 2023. The 2024 Rebels schedule consists of 7 home games and 5 away games for the regular season. Ole Miss will host four SEC conference opponents Georgia, Kentucky, Mississippi State (Egg Bowl) and Oklahoma at home and will travel to four SEC opponents, Arkansas (rivalry), Florida, LSU (Magnolia Bowl) and South Carolina to close out the SEC regular season on the road. The Rebels will have bye weeks that comes in week 8 and 12 (October 19 and November 16, respectively).

Oklahoma is one of two new members of the SEC that will join in July 2024, the Rebels will play the Sooners for the first since the 1999 season at the 1999 Independence Bowl. Ole Miss will host Oklahoma for the time in program's history.

With the two new teams to the SEC (Oklahoma and Texas) and the conference dropping divisions in a new scheduling format, Ole Miss this season will not play notable SEC rivals for the first time in years; Alabama (1991), Auburn (1989) and Vanderbilt (1969).

The 2024 season's out of conference opponents represent the ACC, CUSA, SoCon and the Sun Belt conferences. The Rebels will host three of their four non–conference games which are against Furman from the SoCon, Georgia Southern from the Sun Belt, and Middle Tennessee from CUSA. The Rebels will travel to Wake Forest from the ACC.

Date	Time	Opponent	Rank	Site	TV	Result	Attendance
August 31	6:00 p.m.	No. 12 (FCS) Furman*	No. 6	Vaught–Hemingway Stadium; Oxford, MS	ESPN+/SECN+	W 76–0	66,105
September 7	3:15 p.m.	Middle Tennessee*	No. 6	Vaught–Hemingway Stadium; Oxford, MS	SECN	W 52–3	66,427
September 14	5:30 p.m.	at Wake Forest*	No. 5	Allegacy Federal Credit Union Stadium; Winston-Salem, NC	The CW	W 40–6	32,849
September 21	6:45 p.m.	Georgia Southern*	No. 5	Vaught–Hemingway Stadium; Oxford, MS	SECN	W 52–13	67,505
September 28	11:00 a.m.	Kentucky^{†}	No. 6	Vaught–Hemingway Stadium; Oxford, MS	ABC	L 17–20	67,616
October 5	2:30 p.m.	at South Carolina	No. 12	Williams–Brice Stadium; Columbia, SC	ESPN	W 27–3	79,837
October 12	6:30 p.m.	at No. 13 LSU	No. 9	Tiger Stadium; Baton Rouge, LA (Magnolia Bowl)	ABC	L 26–29 ^{OT}	102,212
October 26	11:00 a.m.	Oklahoma	No. 18	Vaught–Hemingway Stadium; Oxford, MS	ESPN	W 26–14	67,926
November 2	11:00 a.m.	at Arkansas	No. 19	Donald W. Reynolds Razorback Stadium; Fayetteville, AR (rivalry)	ESPN	W 63–31	72,894
November 9	2:30 p.m.	No. 3 Georgia	No. 16	Vaught–Hemingway Stadium; Oxford, MS (SEC Nation)	ABC	W 28–10	68,126
November 23	11:00 a.m.	at Florida	No. 9	Ben Hill Griffin Stadium; Gainesville, FL	ABC	L 17–24	89,942
November 29	2:30 p.m.	Mississippi State	No. 14	Vaught–Hemingway Stadium; Oxford, MS (Egg Bowl)	ABC	W 26–14	67,896
January 2, 2025	7:00 p.m.	vs. Duke*	No. 14	EverBank Stadium; Jacksonville, FL (Gator Bowl)	ESPN	W 52–20	31,290
*Non-conference game; ^{†}Homecoming; Rankings from AP Poll (and CFP Rankings, after November 5) – Released prior to game; All times are in Central time

== Game summaries ==
=== vs No. 12 (FCS) Furman ===
Uniform Combination
Helmet	Jersey	Pants

No. 12 (FCS) Furman Paladins (0–0) at No. 6 Ole Miss Rebels (0–0) – Game summary

Quarter	1	2	3	4	Total
No. 12 (FCS) Paladins	0	0	0	0	0
No. 6 Rebels	24	28	21	3	76

at Vaught–Hemingway Stadium • Oxford, Mississippi

- Date: Saturday, August 31, 2024
- Game time: 6:00 p.m. CST
- Game weather: Cloudy, 83 °F (28 °C)
- Game attendance: 66,105
- Referee: Lee Hedrick
- TV announcers (SECN+/ESPN+):
  Jay Alter (play-by-play)
  Rocky Boiman (color)
  Ashley Stroehlein (sideline)

Game information
1st Quarter
- (11:53) Ole Miss – Jaxson Dart 15 Yd Run (Caden Davis Kick) (Drive: 8 plays, 75 yards, 3:07; Ole Miss 7–0)
- (8:07) Ole Miss – Antwane Wells Jr. 61 Yd pass from Jaxson Dart (Caden Davis Kick) (Drive: 2 plays, 90 yards, 0:36; Ole Miss 14–0)
- (4:39) Ole Miss – JJ Pegues 2 Yd Run (Caden Davis Kick) (Drive: 10 plays, 46 yards, 2:57; Ole Miss 21–0)
- (0:58) Ole Miss – Caden Davis 42 Yd Field Goal (Drive: 5 plays, 20 yards, 1:26; Ole Miss 24–0)

2nd Quarter

- (11:27) Ole Miss – Dae'Quan Wright 4 Yd pass from Jaxson Dart (Caden Davis Kick) (Drive: 7 plays, 63 yards, 3:22; Ole Miss 31–0)
- (8:00) Ole Miss – Caden Prieskorn 46 Yd pass from Jaxson Dart (Caden Davis Kick) (Drive: 2 plays, 81 yards, 0:54; Ole Miss 38–0)
- (6:18) Ole Miss – Tre Harris 61 Yd pass from Jaxson Dart (Caden Davis Kick) (Drive: 1 play, 61 yards, 0:09; Ole Miss 45–0)
- (1:34) Ole Miss – Tre Harris 22 Yd pass from Jaxson Dart (Caden Davis Kick) (Drive: 7 plays, 58 yards, 2:16; Ole Miss 52–0)

3rd Quarter

- (12:49) Ole Miss – Cayden Lee 35 Yd pass from Austin Simmons (Caden Davis Kick) (Drive: 1 play, 35 yards, 0:07; Ole Miss 59–0)
- (4:46) Ole Miss – Matt Jones 17 Yd Run (Caden Davis Kick) (Drive: 4 plays, 52 yards, 1:02; Ole Miss 66–0)
- (0:16) Ole Miss – Matt Jones 46 Yd Run (Caden Davis Kick) (Drive: 8 plays, 73 yards, 2:55; Ole Miss 73–0)

4th Quarter

- (11:42) Ole Miss – Caden Davis 41 Yd Field Goal (Drive: 9 plays, 55 yards, 2:33; Ole Miss 76–0)

Statistics	FUR	MISS
First downs	7	37
Total yards	62–172	82–772
Rushing yards	30–26	37–243
Passing yards	146	529
Passing: Comp–Att–Int	19–34–1	29–45–0
Time of possession	30:50	29:10

Team	Category	Player	Statistics
Furman	Passing	Carson Jones	15–25, 119 yards, 1 INT
Furman	Rushing	Myion Hicks	6 carries, 23 yards
Furman	Receiving	Joshua Harris	3 receptions, 59 yards
Ole Miss	Passing	Jaxson Dart	22–27, 418 yards, 5 TD
Ole Miss	Rushing	Matt Jones	3 carries, 68 yards, 2 TD
Ole Miss	Receiving	Tre Harris	8 receptions, 179 yards, 2 TD

=== vs Middle Tennessee ===
Uniform Combination
Helmet	Jersey	Pants

Middle Tennessee Blue Raiders (1–0) at No. 6 Ole Miss Rebels (1–0) – Game summary

Quarter	1	2	3	4	Total
Blue Raiders	0	3	0	0	3
No. 6 Rebels	17	14	14	7	52

at Vaught–Hemingway Stadium • Oxford, Mississippi

- Date: Saturday, September 7, 2024
- Game time: 3:15 p.m. CST
- Game weather: Sunny, 81 °F (27 °C)
- Game attendance: 66,427
- Referee: Jason Autrey
- TV announcers (SECN):
  Dave Neal (play-by-play)
  Aaron Murray (color)
  Ashley ShahAhmadi (sideline)

Game information
1st Quarter
- (11:30) Ole Miss – Caden Davis 33 Yd Field Goal (Drive: 8 plays, 50 yards, 3:30; Ole Miss 3–0)
- (8:22) Ole Miss – Henry Parrish Jr. 11 Yd Run (Caden Davis Kick) (Drive: 4 plays, 55 yards, 0:53; Ole Miss 10–0)
- (2:10) Ole Miss – Henry Parrish Jr. 11 Yd Run (Caden Davis Kick) (Drive: 9 plays, 60 yards, 4:02; Ole Miss 17–0)

2nd Quarter

- (10:52) Ole Miss – Jaxson Dart 3 Yd Run (Caden Davis Kick) (Drive: 8 plays, 78 yards, 2:14; Ole Miss 24–0)
- (3:07) Ole Miss – Henry Parrish Jr. 3 Yd Run (Caden Davis Kick) (Drive: 11 plays, 99 yards, 4:14; Ole Miss 31–0)
- (0:15) Middle Tennessee – Zeke Rankin 32 Yd Field Goal (Drive: 13 plays, 61 yards, 2:52; Ole Miss 31–3)

3rd Quarter

- (6:00) Ole Miss – Matt Jones 9 Yd Run (Caden Davis Kick) (Drive: 6 plays, 80 yards, 2:09; Ole Miss 38–3)
- (3:10) Ole Miss – Henry Parrish Jr. 1 Yd Run (Caden Davis Kick) (Drive: 4 plays, 14 yards, 1:55; Ole Miss 45–3)

4th Quarter

- (9:44) Ole Miss – Antwane Wells Jr. 18 Yd pass from Jaxson Dart (Caden Davis Kick) (Drive: 9 plays, 94 yards, 2:54; Ole Miss 52–3)

Statistics	MTSU	MISS
First downs	18	34
Total yards	66–279	73–655
Rushing yards	25–28	42–258
Passing yards	251	397
Passing: Comp–Att–Int	26–41–1	27–31–0
Time of possession	33:10	26:50

Team	Category	Player	Statistics
Middle Tennessee	Passing	Nicholas Vattiato	21–33, 209 yards, 1 INT
Middle Tennessee	Rushing	Terry Wilkins	7 carries, 19 yards
Middle Tennessee	Receiving	Holden Willis	7 receptions, 94 yards
Ole Miss	Passing	Jaxson Dart	25–27, 377 yards, 1 TD
Ole Miss	Rushing	Henry Parrish Jr.	14 carries, 165 yards, 4 TD
Ole Miss	Receiving	Tre Harris	9 receptions, 130 yards

=== at Wake Forest ===
Uniform Combination
Helmet	Jersey	Pants

No. 5 Ole Miss Rebels (2–0) at Wake Forest Demon Deacons (1–1) – Game summary

Quarter	1	2	3	4	Total
No. 5 Rebels	20	3	7	10	40
Demon Deacons	3	3	0	0	6

at Allegacy Federal Credit Union Stadium • Winston-Salem, North Carolina

- Date: Saturday, September 14, 2024
- Game time: 5:30 p.m. CST (6:30 p.m. local EST)
- Game weather: Sunny, 77 °F (25 °C)
- Game attendance: 32,849
- Referee: Adam Savoie
- TV announcers (The CW):
  Thom Brennaman (play-by-play)
  Max Browne (color)
  Treavor Scales (sideline)

Game information
1st Quarter
- (13:37) Ole Miss – Henry Parrish Jr. 25 Yd Run (Caden Davis Kick) (Drive: 5 plays, 75 yards, 1:23; Ole Miss 7–0)
- (5:22) Wake Forest – Matthew Dennis 42 Yd Field Goal (Drive: 8 plays, 55 yards, 2:36; Ole Miss 7–3)
- (4:48) Ole Miss – Jordan Watkins 75 Yd pass from Jaxson Dart (Caden Davis Kick) (Drive: 2 plays, 75 yards, 0:34; Ole Miss 14–3)
- (1:55) Ole Miss – Henry Parrish Jr. 22 Yd Run (Caden Davis PAT failed) (Drive: 7 plays, 63 yards, 1:56; Ole Miss 20–3)

2nd Quarter

- (4:44) Ole Miss – Caden Davis 33 Yd Field Goal (Drive: 16 plays, 71 yards, 6:17; Ole Miss 23–3)
- (0:13) Wake Forest – Matthew Dennis 37 Yd Field Goal (Drive: 13 plays, 56 yards, 4:31; Ole Miss 23–6)

3rd Quarter

- (3:39) Ole Miss – Jaxson Dart 13 Yd Run (Caden Davis Kick) (Drive: 11 plays, 96 yards, 4:49; Ole Miss 30–6)

4th Quarter

- (8:02) Ole Miss – Caden Davis 26 Yd Field Goal (Drive: 13 plays, 76 yards, 5:53; Ole Miss 33–6)
- (6:27) Ole Miss – Antwane Wells Jr. 31 Yd pass from Jaxson Dart (Caden Davis Kick) (Drive: 3 plays, 44 yards, 0:59; Ole Miss 40–6)

Statistics	MISS	WAKE
First downs	33	21
Total yards	79–650	74–311
Rushing yards	45–273	32–46
Passing yards	377	265
Passing: Comp–Att–Int	26–34–1	24–42–1
Time of possession	30:39	29:21

Team	Category	Player	Statistics
Ole Miss	Passing	Jaxson Dart	26–34, 377 yards, 2 TD, 1 INT
Ole Miss	Rushing	Henry Parrish Jr.	23 carries, 148 yards, 2 TD
Ole Miss	Receiving	Tre Harris	11 receptions, 127 yards
Wake Forest	Passing	Hank Bachmeier	22–39, 239 yards
Wake Forest	Rushing	Ty Clark III	8 carries, 41 yards
Wake Forest	Receiving	Taylor Morin	5 receptions, 77 yards

=== vs Georgia Southern ===
Uniform Combination
Helmet	Jersey	Pants

Georgia Southern Eagles (2–1) at No. 5 Ole Miss Rebels (3–0) – Game summary

Quarter	1	2	3	4	Total
Eagles	0	7	3	3	13
No. 5 Rebels	17	7	14	14	52

at Vaught–Hemingway Stadium • Oxford, Mississippi

- Date: Saturday, September 21, 2024
- Game time: 6:45 p.m. CST
- Game weather: Cloudy, 82 °F (28 °C)
- Game attendance: 67,505
- Referee: Steve Marlowe
- TV announcers (SECN):
  Tom Hart (play-by-play)
  Jordan Rodgers (color)
  Cole Cubelic (sideline)

Game information
1st Quarter
- (14:29) Ole Miss – Antwane Wells Jr. 35 Yd pass from Jaxson Dart (Caden Davis Kick) (Drive: 2 plays, 75 yards, 0:31; Ole Miss 7–0)
- (13:16) Ole Miss – Caden Davis 28 Yd Field Goal (Drive: 4 plays, −2 yards, 1:07; Ole Miss 10–0)
- (4:39) Ole Miss – Jordan Watkins 23 Yd pass from Jaxson Dart (Caden Davis Kick) (Drive: 14 plays, 80 yards, 6:07; Ole Miss 17–0)

2nd Quarter

- (14:12) Georgia Southern – Derwin Burgess Jr. 12 Yd pass from OJ Arnold (Gavin Stewart Kick) (Drive: 10 plays, 75 yards, 5:27; Ole Miss 17–7)
- (8:08) Ole Miss – Tre Harris 70 Yd pass from Jaxson Dart (Caden Davis Kick) (Drive: 2 plays, 76 yards, 0:35; Ole Miss 24–7)

3rd Quarter

- (9:00) Ole Miss – JJ Pegues 1 Yd Run (Caden Davis Kick) (Drive: 9 plays, 40 yards, 4:13; Ole Miss 31–7)
- (4:33) Ole Miss – Henry Parrish Jr. 5 Yd Run (Caden Davis Kick) (Drive: 6 plays, 70 yards, 2:25; Ole Miss 38–7)
- (0:14) Georgia Southern – Gavin Stewart 42 Yd Field Goal (Drive: 10 plays, 50 yards, 4:12; Ole Miss 38–10)

4th Quarter

- (14:30) Ole Miss – Tre Harris 36 Yd pass from Jaxson Dart (Caden Davis Kick) (Drive: 3 plays, 75 yards, 0:44; Ole Miss 45–10)
- (7:37) Ole Miss – Domonique Thomas 1 Yd Run (Caden Davis Kick) (Drive: 5 plays, 47 yards, 1:43; Ole Miss 52–10)
- (1:56) Georgia Southern – Gavin Stewart 33 Yd Field Goal (Drive: 11 plays, 60 yards, 5:41; Ole Miss 52–13)

Statistics	GASO	MISS
First downs	16	26
Total yards	69–194	69–607
Rushing yards	36–37	36–219
Passing yards	157	388
Passing: Comp–Att–Int	23–33–1	23–33–1
Time of possession	34:26	25:34

Team	Category	Player	Statistics
Georgia Southern	Passing	JC French	20–28, 109 yards
Georgia Southern	Rushing	Jalen White	7 carries, 24 yards
Georgia Southern	Receiving	Derwin Burgess Jr.	5 receptions, 53 yards, 1 TD
Ole Miss	Passing	Jaxson Dart	22–31, 382 yards, 4 TD, 1 INT
Ole Miss	Rushing	Henry Parrish Jr.	13 carries, 89 yards, 1 TD
Ole Miss	Receiving	Tre Harris	11 receptions, 225 yards, 2 TD

=== vs Kentucky ===
Uniform Combination
Helmet	Jersey	Pants

Kentucky Wildcats (2–2) at No. 6 Ole Miss Rebels (4–0) – Game summary

Quarter	1	2	3	4	Total
Wildcats	3	7	3	7	20
No. 6 Rebels	7	0	10	0	17

at Vaught–Hemingway Stadium • Oxford, Mississippi

- Date: Saturday, September 28, 2024
- Game time: 11:00 a.m. CST
- Game weather: Cloudy, 66 °F (19 °C)
- Game attendance: 67,616
- Referee: Wayne Winkler
- TV announcers (ABC):
  Sean McDonough (play-by-play)
  Greg McElroy (color)
  Molly McGrath (sideline)

Game information

1st quarter

- (12:51) Ole Miss – Henry Parrish Jr. 1 Yd Run (Caden Davis Kick) (Drive: 6 plays, 83 yards, 2:05; Ole Miss 7–0)
- (5:13) Kentucky – Alex Raynor 27 Yd Field Goal (Drive: 15 plays, 66 yards, 7:38; Ole Miss 7–3)

2nd quarter

- (0:27) Kentucky – Dane Key 5 Yd pass from Brock Vandagriff (Alex Raynor Kick) (Drive: 13 plays, 81 yards, 5:45; Kentucky 10–7)

3rd quarter

- (9:44) Ole Miss – Caden Davis 31 Yd Field Goal (Drive: 10 plays, 51 yards, 3:08; Tied 10–10)
- (6:31) Kentucky – Alex Raynor 48 Yd Field Goal (Drive: 6 plays, 45 yards, 3:13; Kentucky 13–10)
- (0:10) Ole Miss – Tre Harris 48 Yd pass from Jaxson Dart (Caden Davis Kick) (Drive: 6 plays, 61 yards, 2:01; Ole Miss 17–13)

4th quarter

- (2:25) Kentucky – Josh Kattus 2 Yd Run (Alex Raynor Kick) (Drive: 6 plays, 83 yards, 2:23; Kentucky 20–17)

Statistics	UK	MISS
First downs	22	14
Total yards	75–336	56–353
Rushing yards	47–93	29–92
Passing yards	243	261
Passing: Comp–Att–Int	18–28–0	18–27–0
Time of possession	39:43	20:17

Team	Category	Player	Statistics
Kentucky	Passing	Brock Vandagriff	18–28, 243 yards, 1 TD
Kentucky	Rushing	Demie SumoKarngbaye	11 carries, 47 yards
Kentucky	Receiving	Dane Key	8 receptions, 105 yards, 1 TD
Ole Miss	Passing	Jaxson Dart	18–27, 261 yards, 1 TD
Ole Miss	Rushing	Henry Parrish Jr.	13 carries, 62 yards, 1 TD
Ole Miss	Receiving	Tre Harris	11 receptions, 176 yards, 1 TD

=== at South Carolina ===
Uniform Combination
Helmet	Jersey	Pants

No. 12 Ole Miss Rebels (4–1) at South Carolina Gamecocks (3–1) – Game summary

Quarter	1	2	3	4	Total
No. 12 Rebels	14	10	3	0	27
Gamecocks	0	3	0	0	3

at Williams–Brice Stadium • Columbia, South Carolina

- Date: Saturday, October 5, 2024
- Game time: 2:30 p.m. CST (3:30 p.m. local EST)
- Game weather: Sunny, 83 °F (28 °C)
- Game attendance: 79,837
- Referee: David Smith
- TV announcers (ESPN):
  Dave Pasch (play-by-play)
  Dusty Dvoracek (color)
  Taylor McGregor (sideline)

Game information

1st Quarter

- (10:36) Ole Miss – Henry Parrish Jr. 3 Yd Run (Caden Davis Kick) (Drive: 5 plays, 36 yards, 1:36; Ole Miss 7–0)
- (5:57) Ole Miss – JJ Pegues 1 Yd Run (Caden Davis Kick) (Drive: 8 plays, 59 yards, 3:07; Ole Miss 14–0)

2nd Quarter

- (10:08) South Carolina – Alex Herrera 40 Yd Field Goal (Drive: 5 plays, 25 yards, 1:49; Ole Miss 14–3)
- (7:16) Ole Miss – Caden Davis 24 Yd Field Goal (Drive: 8 plays, 68 yards, 2:52; Ole Miss 17–3)
- (0:31) Ole Miss – JJ Pegues 1 Yd Run (Caden Davis Kick) (Drive: 6 plays, 59 yards, 1:15; Ole Miss 24–3)

3rd Quarter

- (1:56) Ole Miss – Caden Davis 44 Yd Field Goal (Drive: 9 plays, 53 yards, 2:21; Ole Miss 27–3)

4th Quarter

- No scoring plays

Statistics	MISS	SCAR
First downs	17	19
Total yards	68–425	76–313
Rushing yards	41–140	43–151
Passing yards	285	162
Passing: Comp–Att–Int	14–27–0	20–33–1
Time of possession	27:22	32:38

Team	Category	Player	Statistics
Ole Miss	Passing	Jaxson Dart	14–27, 285 yards
Ole Miss	Rushing	Henry Parrish Jr.	21 carries, 81 yards, 1 TD
Ole Miss	Receiving	Antwane Wells Jr.	3 receptions, 97 yards
South Carolina	Passing	LaNorris Sellers	20–32, 162 yards, 1 INT
South Carolina	Rushing	LaNorris Sellers	15 carries, 55 yards
South Carolina	Receiving	Mazeo Bennett Jr.	3 receptions, 41 yards

=== at No. 13 LSU (Magnolia Bowl) ===
Uniform Combination
Helmet	Jersey	Pants

No. 9 Ole Miss Rebels (5–1) at No. 13 LSU Tigers (4–1) – Game summary

Quarter	1	2	3	4	OT	Total
No. 9 Rebels	0	17	3	3	3	26
No. 13 Tigers	0	13	3	7	6	29

at Tiger Stadium • Baton Rouge, Louisiana

- Date: Saturday, October 12, 2024
- Game time: 6:30 p.m. CST
- Game weather: Clear, 80 °F (27 °C)
- Game attendance: 102,212
- Referee: Ken Williamson
- TV announcers (ABC):
  Sean McDonough (play-by-play)
  Greg McElroy (color)
  Molly McGrath (sideline)

Game information

1st Quarter

- No scoring plays

2nd Quarter

- (10:36) Ole Miss – Caden Davis 49 Yd Field Goal (Drive: 6 plays, 51 yards, 2:32; Ole Miss 3–0)
- (8:39) Ole Miss – Ulysses Bentley IV 50 Yd Run (Caden Davis Kick) (Drive: 4 plays, 59 yards, 1:08; Ole Miss 10–0)
- (5:33) LSU – Trey'Dez Green 12 Yd pass from Garrett Nussmeier (Damian Ramos Kick) (Drive: 6 plays, 75 yards, 3:06; Ole Miss 10–7)
- (1:42) Ole Miss – Tre Harris 15 Yd pass from Jaxson Dart (Caden Davis Kick) (Drive: 11 plays, 75 yards, 3:51; Ole Miss 17–7)
- (0:34) LSU – Damian Ramos 33 Yd Field Goal (Drive: 8 plays, 59 yards, 1:08; Ole Miss 17–10)
- (0:05) LSU – Damian Ramos 45 Yd Field Goal (Drive: 4 plays, 0 yards, 0:21; Ole Miss 17–13)

3rd Quarter

- (4:41) Ole Miss – Caden Davis 35 Yd Field Goal (Drive: 10 plays, 54 yards, 2:36; Ole Miss 20–13)
- (1:10) LSU – Damian Ramos 41 Yd Field Goal (Drive: 10 plays, 51 yards, 3:31; Ole Miss 20–16)

4th Quarter

- (3:14) Ole Miss – Caden Davis 37 Yd Field Goal (Drive: 7 plays, 54 yards, 3:07; Ole Miss 23–16)
- (0:27) LSU – Aaron Anderson 23 Yd pass from Garrett Nussmeier (Damian Ramos Kick) (Drive: 13 plays, 75 yards, 2:47; Tied 23–23)

Overtime

- Ole Miss – Caden Davis 57 Yd Field Goal (Drive: 4 plays, −15 yards; Ole Miss 26–23)
- LSU – Kyren Lacy 25 Yd pass from Garrett Nussmeier (Drive: 1 play, 25 yards; LSU 29–26)

Statistics	MISS	LSU
First downs	22	22
Total yards	84–463	75–421
Rushing yards	42–179	24–84
Passing yards	284	337
Passing: Comp–Att–Int	24–42–1	22–51–2
Time of possession	31:50	28:10

Team	Category	Player	Statistics
Ole Miss	Passing	Jaxson Dart	24–42, 284 yards, 1 TD, 1 INT
Ole Miss	Rushing	Ulysses Bentley IV	11 carries, 107 yards, 1 TD
Ole Miss	Receiving	Cayden Lee	9 receptions, 132 yards
LSU	Passing	Garrett Nussmeier	22–51, 337 yards, 3 TD, 2 INT
LSU	Rushing	Caden Durham	12 carries, 37 yards
LSU	Receiving	Kyren Lacy	5 receptions, 111 yards, 1 TD

=== vs Oklahoma ===
Uniform Combination
Helmet	Jersey	Pants

Oklahoma Sooners (4–3) at No. 18 Ole Miss Rebels (5–2) – Game summary

Quarter	1	2	3	4	Total
Sooners	7	7	0	0	14
No. 18 Rebels	7	3	13	3	26

at Vaught–Hemingway Stadium • Oxford, Mississippi

- Date: Saturday, October 26, 2024
- Game time: 11:00 a.m. CST
- Game weather: Sunny, 75 °F (24 °C)
- Game attendance: 67,926
- Referee: David Smith
- TV announcers (ESPN):
  Bob Wischusen (play-by-play)
  Louis Riddick (color)
  Kris Budden (sideline)

Game information

1st Quarter

- (12:36) Ole Miss – Henry Parrish Jr. 9 Yd Run (Caden Davis Kick) (Drive: 6 plays, 75 yards, 2:24; Ole Miss 7–0)
- (2:18) Oklahoma – Bauer Sharp 11 Yd pass from Jackson Arnold (Zach Schmit Kick) (Drive: 8 plays, 60 yards, 3:43; Tied 7–7)

2nd Quarter

- (7:29) Ole Miss – Caden Davis 35 Yd Field Goal (Drive: 10 plays, 68 yards, 4:25; Ole Miss 10–7)
- (0:06) Oklahoma – Jacob Jordan 9 Yd pass from Jackson Arnold (Zach Schmit Kick) (Drive: 13 plays, 92 yards, 2:34; Oklahoma 14–10)

3rd Quarter

- (9:34) Ole Miss – Caden Prieskorn 24 Yd pass from Jaxson Dart (Caden Davis PAT failed) (Drive: 8 plays, 65 yards, 3:32; Ole Miss 16–14)
- (5:20) Ole Miss – JJ Pegues 1 Yd Run (Caden Davis Kick) (Drive: 7 plays, 83 yards, 2:50; Ole Miss 23–14)

4th Quarter

- (14:51) Ole Miss – Caden Davis 42 Yd Field Goal (Drive: 6 plays, 43 yards, 2:02; Ole Miss 26–14)

Statistics	OU	MISS
First downs	24	18
Total yards	81–329	61–380
Rushing yards	50–147	31–69
Passing yards	182	311
Passing: Comp–Att–Int	22–31–0	22–30–0
Time of possession	33:45	26:15

Team	Category	Player	Statistics
Oklahoma	Passing	Jackson Arnold	22–31, 182 yards, 2 TD
Oklahoma	Rushing	Jovantae Barnes	16 carries, 67 yards
Oklahoma	Receiving	Jovantae Barnes	5 receptions, 57 yards
Ole Miss	Passing	Jaxson Dart	22–30, 311 yards, 1 TD
Ole Miss	Rushing	Henry Parrish Jr.	15 carries, 44 yards, 1 TD
Ole Miss	Receiving	Caden Prieskorn	5 receptions, 71 yards, 1 TD

=== at Arkansas (rivalry) ===
Uniform Combination
Helmet	Jersey	Pants

No. 19 Ole Miss Rebels (6–2) at Arkansas Razorbacks (5–3) – Game summary

Quarter	1	2	3	4	Total
No. 19 Rebels	7	28	21	7	63
Razorbacks	3	7	14	7	31

at Donald W. Reynolds Razorback Stadium • Fayetteville, Arkansas

- Date: Saturday, November 2, 2024
- Game time: 11:00 a.m. CST
- Game weather: Cloudy, 62 °F (17 °C)
- Game attendance: 72,894
- Referee: Jason Autrey
- TV announcers (ESPN):
  Mark Jones (play-by-play)
  Roddy Jones (color)
  Quint Kessenich (sideline)

Game information

1st Quarter

- (6:56) Ole Miss – Princely Umanmielen 0 Yd Fumble Return (Caden Davis Kick) (Ole Miss 7–0)
- (3:19) Arkansas – Matthew Shipley 55 Yd Field Goal (Drive: 7 plays, 38 yards, 3:37; Ole Miss 7–3)

2nd Quarter

- (14:28) Ole Miss – Dae'Quan Wright 4 Yd pass from Jaxson Dart (Caden Davis Kick) (Drive: 11 plays, 75 yards, 3:51; Ole Miss 14–3)
- (12:10) Ole Miss – Jordan Watkins 62 Yd pass from Jaxson Dart (Caden Davis Kick) (Drive: 1 play, 62 yards, 0:08; Ole Miss 21–3)
- (10:07) Ole Miss – Jordan Watkins 66 Yd pass from Jaxson Dart (Caden Davis Kick) (Drive: 2 plays, 68 yards, 0:37; Ole Miss 28–3)
- (5:50) Arkansas – Rashod Dubinion 6 Yd Run (Matthew Shipley Kick) (Drive: 9 plays, 75 yards, 4:17; Ole Miss 28–10)
- (0:05) Ole Miss – Jordan Watkins 3 Yd pass from Jaxson Dart (Caden Davis Kick) (Drive: 8 plays, 73 yards, 1:13; Ole Miss 35–10)

3rd Quarter

- (12:00) Ole Miss – Jordan Watkins 11 Yd pass from Jaxson Dart (Caden Davis Kick) (Drive: 7 plays, 75 yards, 3:00; Ole Miss 42–10)
- (9:49) Arkansas – Malachi Singleton 13 Yd Run (Matthew Shipley Kick) (Drive: 5 plays, 75 yards, 2:11; Ole Miss 42–17)
- (6:59) Ole Miss – JJ Pegues 1 Yd Run (Caden Davis Kick) (Drive: 6 plays, 79 yards, 2:42; Ole Miss 49–17)
- (4:48) Ole Miss – Jordan Watkins 62 Yd pass from Jaxson Dart (Caden Davis Kick) (Drive: 2 plays, 64 yards, 0:46; Ole Miss 56–17)
- (2:22) Arkansas – Rodney Hill 2 Yd Run (Matthew Shipley Kick) (Drive: 7 plays, 75 yards, 2:26; Ole Miss 56–24)

4th Quarter

- (6:47) Ole Miss – Dae'Quan Wright 12 Yd pass from Austin Simmons (Caden Davis Kick) (Drive: 10 plays, 80 yards, 5:36; Ole Miss 63–24)
- (3:14) Arkansas – Luke Hasz 22 Yd pass from Malachi Singleton (Matthew Shipley Kick) (Drive: 8 plays, 75 yards, 3:33; Ole Miss 63–31)

Statistics	MISS	ARK
First downs	29	24
Total yards	76–694	65–497
Rushing yards	42–132	37–132
Passing yards	562	365
Passing: Comp–Att–Int	28–34–0	21–28–0
Time of possession	31:26	28:34

Team	Category	Player	Statistics
Ole Miss	Passing	Jaxson Dart	25–31, 515 yards, 6 TD
Ole Miss	Rushing	Jaxson Dart	10 carries, 47 yards
Ole Miss	Receiving	Jordan Watkins	8 receptions, 254 yards, 5 TD
Arkansas	Passing	Malachi Singleton	11–14, 207 yards, 1 TD
Arkansas	Rushing	Rashod Dubinion	12 carries, 49 yards, 1 TD
Arkansas	Receiving	Andrew Armstrong	6 receptions, 135 yards

*Statistics in italics set new single-game school records (although Jaxson Dart's six touchdown passes tied, rather than broke, the school record). Additionally, the 63 points scored tied the school record for most points scored against an SEC opponent.

=== vs No. 3 Georgia ===
Uniform Combination
Helmet	Jersey	Pants

No. 3 Georgia Bulldogs (7–1) at No. 16 Ole Miss Rebels (7–2) – Game summary

Quarter	1	2	3	4	Total
No. 3 Bulldogs	7	0	3	0	10
No. 16 Rebels	10	6	6	6	28

at Vaught–Hemingway Stadium • Oxford, Mississippi

- Date: Saturday, November 9, 2024
- Game time: 2:30 p.m. CST
- Game weather: Rain, 67 °F (19 °C)
- Game attendance: 68,126
- Referee: Jeff Heaser
- TV announcers (ABC):
  Sean McDonough (play-by-play)
  Greg McElroy (color)
  Molly McGrath (sideline)

Game information

1st Quarter

- (10:32) Georgia – Nate Frazier 2 Yd Run (Peyton Woodring Kick) (Drive: 7 plays, 21 yards, 3:21; Georgia 7–0)
- (6:53) Ole Miss – Ulysses Bentley IV 9 Yd Run (Caden Davis Kick) (Drive: 10 plays, 75 yards, 3:39; Tied 7–7)
- (3:01) Ole Miss – Caden Davis 23 Yd Field Goal (Drive: 6 plays, 44 yards, 2:04; Ole Miss 10–7)

2nd Quarter

- (12:12) Ole Miss – Caden Davis 43 Yd Field Goal (Drive: 9 plays, 51 yards, 4:08; Ole Miss 13–7)
- (2:55) Ole Miss – Caden Davis 53 Yd Field Goal (Drive: 10 plays, 63 yards, 4:19; Ole Miss 16–7)

3rd Quarter

- (9:44) Georgia – Peyton Woodring 23 Yd Field Goal (Drive: 9 plays, 70 yards, 5:16; Ole Miss 16–10)
- (6:10) Ole Miss – Antwane Wells Jr. 10 Yd pass from Jaxson Dart (Two-Point Pass Conversion Failed) (Drive: 8 plays, 75 yards, 3:34; Ole Miss 22–10)

4th Quarter

- (3:22) Ole Miss – Caden Davis 24 Yd Field Goal (Drive: 10 plays, 68 yards, 4:00; Ole Miss 25–10)
- (1:11) Ole Miss – Caden Davis 32 Yd Field Goal (Drive: 4 plays, 5 yards, 1:57; Ole Miss 28–10)

Statistics	UGA	MISS
First downs	16	19
Total yards	64–245	64–395
Rushing yards	33–59	36–132
Passing yards	186	263
Passing: Comp–Att–Int	20–31–1	18–28–1
Time of possession	32:15	27:45

Team	Category	Player	Statistics
Georgia	Passing	Carson Beck	20–31, 186 yards, 1 INT
Georgia	Rushing	Nate Frazier	12 carries, 47 yards, 1 TD
Georgia	Receiving	Dominic Lovett	4 receptions, 41 yards
Ole Miss	Passing	Jaxson Dart	13–22, 199 yards, 1 TD, 1 INT
Ole Miss	Rushing	Jaxson Dart	8 carries, 50 yards
Ole Miss	Receiving	Cayden Lee	4 receptions, 81 yards

=== at Florida ===
Uniform Combination
Helmet	Jersey	Pants

No. 9 Ole Miss Rebels (8–2) at Florida Gators (5–5) – Game summary

Quarter	1	2	3	4	Total
No. 9 Rebels	0	14	3	0	17
Gators	0	14	3	7	24

at Ben Hill Griffin Stadium • Gainesville, Florida

- Date: Saturday, November 23, 2024
- Game time: 11:00 a.m. CST (12:00 p.m. local EST)
- Game weather: Sunny, 59 °F (15 °C)
- Game attendance: 89,942
- Referee: Daniel Gautreaux
- TV announcers (ABC):
  Bob Wischusen (play-by-play)
  Greg McElroy (color)
  Molly McGrath (sideline reporter)

Game information

1st Quarter

- No scoring plays

2nd Quarter

- (14:56) Florida – Elijhah Badger 8 Yd pass from DJ Lagway (Trey Smack Kick) (Drive: 11 plays, 89 yards, 5:40; Florida 7–0)
- (12:01) Ole Miss – Tre Harris 43 Yd pass from Jaxson Dart (Caden Davis Kick) (Drive: 7 plays, 75 yards, 2:55; Tied 7–7)
- (9:05) Ole Miss – Cayden Lee 22 Yd pass from Jaxson Dart (Caden Davis Kick) (Drive: 5 plays, 55 yards, 2:16; Ole Miss 14–7)
- (6:52) Florida – Jadan Baugh 25 Yd pass from DJ Lagway (Trey Smack Kick) (Drive: 4 plays, 75 yards, 2:13; Tied 14–14)

3rd Quarter

- (10:57) Florida – Trey Smack 53 Yd Field Goal (Drive: 4 plays, 2 yards, 1:34; Florida 17–14)
- (0:45) Ole Miss – Caden Davis 42 Yd Field Goal (Drive: 7 plays, 27 yards, 3:34; Tied 17–17)

4th Quarter

- (7:40) Florida – Montrell Johnson Jr. 9 Yd Run (Trey Smack Kick) (Drive: 4 plays, 67 yards, 1:54; Florida 24–17)

Statistics	MISS	UF
First downs	24	19
Total yards	77–464	63–344
Rushing yards	35–141	45–164
Passing yards	323	180
Passing: Comp–Att–Int	24–42–2	10–18–1
Time of possession	29:56	30:04

Team	Category	Player	Statistics
Ole Miss	Passing	Jaxson Dart	24–41, 323 yards, 2 TD, 2 INT
Ole Miss	Rushing	Jaxson Dart	14 carries, 71 yards
Ole Miss	Receiving	Cayden Lee	6 receptions, 94 yards, 1 TD
Florida	Passing	DJ Lagway	10–17, 180 yards, 2 TD, 1 INT
Florida	Rushing	Montrell Johnson Jr.	18 carries, 107 yards, 1 TD
Florida	Receiving	Elijhah Badger	5 receptions, 87 yards, 1 TD

=== vs Mississippi State (Egg Bowl) ===
Uniform Combination
Helmet	Jersey	Pants

Mississippi State Bulldogs (2–9) at No. 14 Ole Miss Rebels (8–3) – Game summary

Quarter	1	2	3	4	Total
Bulldogs	14	0	0	0	14
No. 14 Rebels	10	7	3	6	26

at Vaught–Hemingway Stadium • Oxford, Mississippi

- Date: Friday, November 29, 2024
- Game time: 2:30 p.m. CST
- Game weather: Sunny, 47 °F (8 °C)
- Game attendance: 67,896
- Referee: Wayne Winkler
- TV announcers (ABC):
  Tom Hart (play-by-play)
  Louis Riddick (color)
  Kris Budden (sideline reporter)

Game information

1st Quarter

- (12:43) Ole Miss – Caden Davis 39 Yd Field Goal (Drive: 6 plays, 12 yards, 1:46; Ole Miss 3–0)
- (7:54) Mississippi State – Kevin Coleman Jr. 34 Yd pass from Michael Van Buren Jr. (Kyle Ferrie Kick) (Drive: 11 plays, 75 yards, 4:49; Mississippi State 7–3)
- (2:16) Ole Miss – JJ Pegues 5 Yd Run (Caden Davis Kick) (Drive: 13 plays, 75 yards, 5:38; Ole Miss 10–7)
- (0:00) Mississippi State – Michael Van Buren Jr. 6 Yd Run (Kyle Ferrie Kick) (Drive: 6 plays, 75 yards, 2:16; Mississippi State 14–10)

2nd Quarter

- (8:40) Ole Miss – Ulysses Bentley IV 89 Yd Run (Caden Davis Kick) (Drive: 1 play, 89 yards, 0:15; Ole Miss 17–14)

3rd Quarter

- (5:48) Ole Miss – Caden Davis 43 Yd Field Goal (Drive: 4 plays, -2 yards, 0:43; Ole Miss 20–14)

4th Quarter

- (9:56) Ole Miss – Caden Prieskorn 19 Yd pass from Jaxson Dart (Two-Point Pass Conversion Failed) (Drive: 10 plays, 87 yards, 4:52; Ole Miss 26–14)

Statistics	MSST	MISS
First downs	16	21
Total yards	63–330	75–397
Rushing yards	30–39	51–254
Passing yards	291	143
Passing: Comp–Att–Int	18–33–2	14–24–0
Time of possession	28:17	31:43

Team	Category	Player	Statistics
Mississippi State	Passing	Michael Van Buren Jr.	17–32, 280 yards, 1 TD, 2 INT
Mississippi State	Rushing	Davon Booth	16 carries, 38 yards
Mississippi State	Receiving	Kevin Coleman Jr.	6 receptions, 118 yards, 1 TD
Ole Miss	Passing	Jaxson Dart	14–24, 143 yards, 1 TD
Ole Miss	Rushing	Ulysses Bentley IV	20 carries, 136 yards, 1 TD
Ole Miss	Receiving	Caden Prieskorn	4 receptions, 53 yards, 1 TD

=== vs Duke (Gator Bowl) ===
Uniform Combination
Helmet	Jersey	Pants

2025 Gator Bowl
Duke Blue Devils (9–3) vs. No. 14 Ole Miss Rebels (9–3) – Game summary

Quarter	1	2	3	4	Total
Blue Devils	0	7	0	13	20
No. 14 Rebels	14	10	14	14	52

at EverBank Stadium • Jacksonville, Florida

- Date: Thursday, January 2, 2025
- Game time: 7:05 p.m. CST (8:05 p.m. local EST)
- Game weather: Cloudy, 49 °F (9 °C)
- Game attendance: 31,290
- Referee: Jeffrey Servinski
- TV announcers (ESPN):
  Dave Pasch (play-by-play)
  Dusty Dvoracek (color)
  Taylor McGregor (sideline)

Game information

1st Quarter

- (8:07) Ole Miss – Antwane Wells Jr. 32 Yd pass from Jaxson Dart (Caden Davis Kick) (Drive: 4 plays, 68 yards, 1:05; Ole Miss 7–0)
- (2:29) Ole Miss – Ulysses Bentley IV 1 Yd Run (Caden Davis Kick) (Drive: 11 plays, 66 yards, 4:02; Ole Miss 14–0)

2nd Quarter

- (9:43) Ole Miss – Caden Davis 28 Yd Field Goal (Drive: 12 plays, 61 yards, 5:06; Ole Miss 17–0)
- (5:54) Duke – Javon Harvey 16 Yd pass from Henry Belin IV (Todd Pelino Kick) (Drive: 8 plays, 75 yards, 3:49; Ole Miss 17–7)
- (1:52) Ole Miss – Dae'Quan Wright 21 Yd pass from Jaxson Dart (Caden Davis Kick) (Drive: 10 plays, 75 yards, 4:02; Ole Miss 24–7)

3rd Quarter

- (8:18) Ole Miss – Isaiah Hamilton 50 Yd Interception Return (Caden Davis Kick) (Ole Miss 31–7)
- (1:20) Ole Miss – Ulysses Bentley IV 8 Yd Run (Caden Davis Kick) (Drive: 4 plays, 74 yards, 2:02; Ole Miss 38–7)

4th Quarter

- (9:56) Ole Miss – Jordan Watkins 1 Yd pass from Jaxson Dart (Caden Davis Kick) (Drive: 4 plays, 38 yards, 1:41; Ole Miss 45–7)
- (3:43) Duke – Jordan Moore 20 Yd pass from Henry Belin IV (Todd Pelino Kick) (Drive: 11 plays, 75 yards, 6:13; Ole Miss 45–14)
- (1:27) Ole Miss – Jordan Watkins 69 Yd pass from Jaxson Dart (Mike Baker Kick) (Drive: 4 plays, 75 yards, 2:16; Ole Miss 52–14)
- (1:07) Duke – Sahmir Hagans 99 Yd Kickoff Return (Todd Pelino PAT blocked) (Ole Miss 52–20)

Statistics	DUKE	MISS
First downs	17	27
Total yards	68–280	70–589
Rushing yards	23–44	33–151
Passing yards	236	438
Passing: Comp–Att–Int	25–45–1	28–37–1
Time of possession	30:02	29:58

Team	Category	Player	Statistics
Duke	Passing	Henry Belin IV	25–44, 236 yards, 2 TD, 1 INT
Duke	Rushing	Peyton Jones	8 carries, 18 yards
Duke	Receiving	Jordan Moore	5 receptions, 63 yards, 1 TD
Ole Miss	Passing	Jaxson Dart	27–35, 404 yards, 4 TD
Ole Miss	Rushing	Ulysses Bentley IV	14 carries, 70 yards, 2 TD
Ole Miss	Receiving	Jordan Watkins	7 receptions, 180 yards, 2 TD

== Cumulative Season Statistics ==
=== Cumulative Team Statistics ===
Category	Ole Miss	Opponents
First downs - Avg. per game	322 - 24.77	242 - 18.62
Points - Avg. per game	502 - 38.62	187 - 14.38
Total plays/yards - Avg. per game	934/6846 (7.33 yards/play) - 71.85/526.62	903/4046 (4.48 yards/play) - 69.46/311.23
Passing yards - Avg. per game	4561 - 350.85	3000 - 230.77
Rushes/yards (net) - Avg. per game	500/2285 - 38.46/175.77 (4.57 yards/carry)	456/1046 - 35.08/80.46 (2.29 yards/carry)
Passing (Att-Comp-Int)	434-295-7 (67.97% completion)	447-267-12 (59.73% completion)
Sacks - Avg. per game	52 - 4	29 - 2.23
Penalties/yards - Avg. per game	94/936 - 7.23/72	80/699 - 5.62/53.77
3rd down conversions	71/169 (42.01%)	65/205 (31.71%)
4th down conversions	17/29 (58.62%)	19/37 (51.35%)
Time of possession - Avg. per game	6:08:59 - 28:23	6:50:32 - 31:35

=== Cumulative Player Statistics ===
Category	Player	Statistics - Avg. per game
Leading Passer	Jaxson Dart	276/398 (69.35% completion), 4279 yards, 29 TD, 6 INT - 21.23/30.62, 329.15 yards, 2.23 TD, 0.46 INT
Leading Rusher	Henry Parrish Jr.	130 carries, 678 yards, 10 TD - 14.44 carries, 75.33 yards (5.22 yards/carry), 1.11 TD
Leading Receiver	Tre Harris	60 receptions, 1030 yards, 7 TD - 7.5 receptions, 128.5 yards, 0.88 TD

== Coaching staff ==
Coach	Title	Year at Ole Miss	Previous job
Lane Kiffin	Head Coach	5th	Florida Atlantic
Charlie Weis Jr.	OC/QB	3rd	South Florida (OC/QB)
Pete Golding	DC/LB	2nd	Alabama (DC/LB)
Wes Neighbors III	S	2nd	Maryland (S)
Randall Joyner	DL	4th	SMU (DL)
Bryan Brown	Co-DC/Secondary	1st	Cincinnati (AHC/DC)
John Garrison	OL	2nd	NC State (OL)
Joe Cox	Co-OC/TE	1st	Alabama (TE)
Jake Schoonover	STC	2nd	Arkansas State (STC)
George McDonald	WR/PGC	1st	Illinois (AHC/WR)
Kevin Smith	RB	4th	Miami (RB)

== Rankings ==
Ranking movements Legend: ██ Increase in ranking ██ Decrease in ranking
	Week																
Poll	Pre	1	2	3	4	5	6	7	8	9	10	11	12	13	14	15	Final
AP	6	6	5	5	6	12	9	18	18	19	16	10	9	15	15	16	11
Coaches	6	5	5	5	5	11	8	15	18	18	12	11	9	16	15	15	13
CFP	Not released										16	11	9	14	13	14	Not released
