= 2024 South Carolina Gamecocks football team =

American college football season

2024 South Carolina Gamecocks football

Palmetto Bowl champion

Citrus Bowl, L 17–21 vs. Illinois
- Conference: Southeastern Conference

Ranking
- Coaches: No. 19
- AP: No. 19
- Record: 9–4 (5–3 SEC)
- Head coach: Shane Beamer (4th season)
- Offensive coordinator: Dowell Loggains (2nd season)
- Offensive scheme: Multiple
- Defensive coordinator: Clayton White (4th season)
- Base defense: 4–2–5
- Home stadium: Williams–Brice Stadium

Uniform
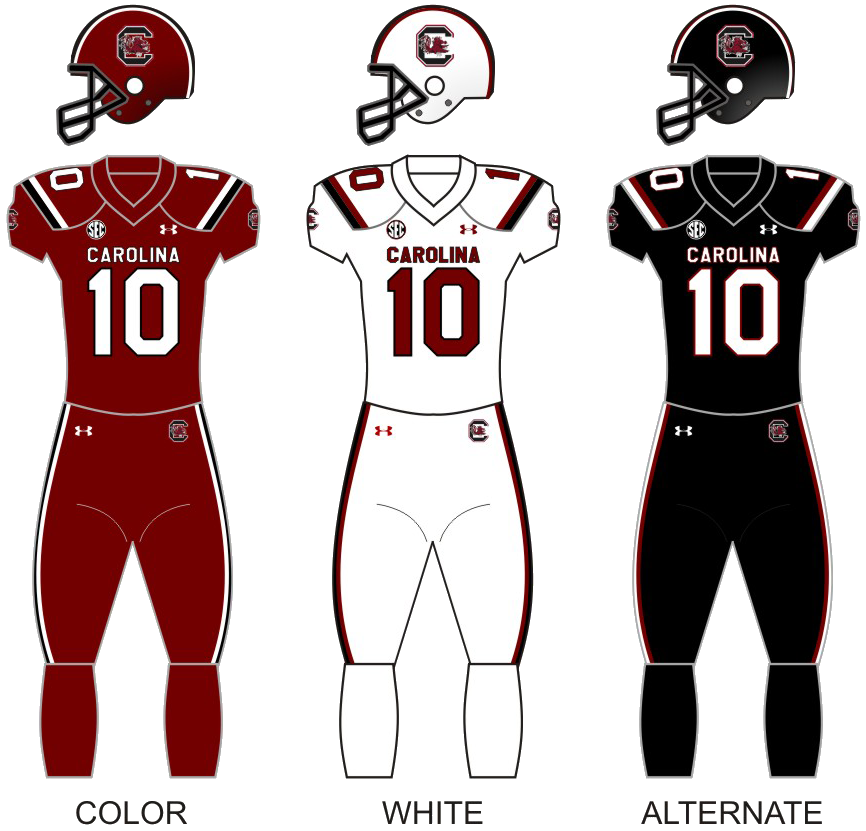

2024 Southeastern Conference football standings
	Conf.			Overall
Team	W		L	W		L
No. 4 Texas y^	7	–	1	13	–	3
No. 6 Georgia y$^	6	–	2	11	–	3
No. 9 Tennessee ^	6	–	2	10	–	3
No. 22 Missouri	5	–	3	10	–	3
No. 11 Ole Miss	5	–	3	10	–	3
No. 17 Alabama	5	–	3	9	–	4
No. 19 South Carolina	5	–	3	9	–	4
LSU	5	–	3	9	–	4
Texas A&M	5	–	3	8	–	5
Florida	4	–	4	8	–	5
Arkansas	3	–	5	7	–	6
Vanderbilt	3	–	5	7	–	6
Oklahoma	2	–	6	6	–	7
Auburn	2	–	6	5	–	7
Kentucky	1	–	7	4	–	8
Mississippi State	0	–	8	2	–	10
Championship: Georgia 22, Texas 19 ^{OT}
^ – College Football Playoff participant; $ – Conference champion; y – Championship game participant; Rankings from AP Poll

The 2024 South Carolina Gamecocks football team represented the University of South Carolina as a member of the Southeastern Conference (SEC) during the 2024 NCAA Division I FBS football season. The Gamecocks played their home games at Williams–Brice Stadium located in Columbia, South Carolina, and were led by Shane Beamer, who was in his fourth year as their head coach.

Predicted to only win five games and finish thirteenth in the SEC, South Carolina achieved the eighth nine-win season in program history. The Gamecocks recorded their first 5–3 conference record since 2017 and the first of Beamer's tenure. They defeated three conference opponents on the road for the first time since 2011. Shane Beamer broke the record for most wins in the first four seasons by a Gamecock head coach, and he was named the SEC Coach of the Year.

Following a disappointing and controversial first half of the season, (Note: The 2024 South Carolina-LSU game has been described by Saturday Down South as "extremely controversial", with two Gamecock defensive touchdowns taken away due to penalties. Near the end of the regular season, ESPN analyst Paul Finebaum commented: "South Carolina had [LSU] down seventeen. And then a couple of just unbelievably bad officiating calls at the end took the game away from South Carolina. And that may have been the most important officials call of the season in the SEC because, right now, South Carolina very likely would be in the playoff situation, and LSU would've been gone three weeks ago.") which saw close losses to LSU and Alabama as well as a blowout loss to Ole Miss, the Gamecocks won the last six games in the regular season. The four-game SEC winning streak was the first since 2012, while the four ranked wins and three regular season trophies were school records. (Note: At the time of their matchup with South Carolina on November 9th, Vanderbilt was not ranked in the more-relevant College Football Playoff rankings, but was ranked No. 24 in the AP Poll. This gave the Gamecocks four victories over "ranked teams" in 2024, a school record.) (Note: As of 2024, South Carolina had three regular season "trophy games": the Bonham Trophy for Texas A&M, the Mayor's Cup for Missouri, and the Palmetto Bowl Trophy for Clemson. The 2024 season was the first in which South Carolina defeated all three teams in the same season.) Two of those trophy wins were decided by late touchdowns. The winning streak earned South Carolina consideration for the College Football Playoff, (Note: Sources:) but they were instead invited to the Citrus Bowl, where they lost to Illinois. A particular source of controversy was officiating during Carolina's matchup against LSU.

The Gamecocks were led by redshirt freshman quarterback sensation LaNorris Sellers as well as a defense that ranked among the best in the nation and school history. Kyle Kennard won the Bronko Nagurski Trophy, honoring him as the top defensive player in college football, and was a finalist for the Lombardi Award. Kennard was a consensus All-American, only the fifth in program history. Dylan Stewart was a finalist for the Shaun Alexander Freshman of the Year Award. Five defensive players were selected in the following NFL draft, a school record. Following the regular season, Sellers began receiving consideration as one of the best players in the country and was awarded SEC Freshman of the Year. Punter Kai Kroeger was also awarded All-American and 1st Team All-SEC honors for the second time in his career as a Gamecock.

== Schedule ==
South Carolina and the SEC announced the 2024 football schedule on December 13, 2023. This was the first season South Carolina did not play Georgia since the Gamecocks joined the SEC in 1992, and only the sixth time the two teams did not meet since 1958. South Carolina also hosted College GameDay for the first time since 2014.

Date	Time	Opponent	Rank	Site	TV	Result	Attendance
August 31	4:15 p.m.	Old Dominion*		Williams–Brice Stadium; Columbia, SC	SECN	W 23–19	78,496
September 7	3:30 p.m.	at Kentucky		Kroger Field; Lexington, KY (SEC Nation)	ABC	W 31–6	61,349
September 14	12:00 p.m.	No. 16 LSU		Williams–Brice Stadium; Columbia, SC (College GameDay)	ABC	L 33–36	79,531
September 21	7:30 p.m.	Akron*		Williams–Brice Stadium; Columbia, SC	ESPNU	W 50–7	78,704
October 5	3:30 p.m.	No. 12 Ole Miss		Williams–Brice Stadium; Columbia, SC	ESPN	L 3–27	79,837
October 12	12:00 p.m.	at No. 7 Alabama		Bryant–Denny Stadium; Tuscaloosa, AL	ABC	L 25–27	100,077
October 19	12:45 p.m.	at Oklahoma		Gaylord Family Oklahoma Memorial Stadium; Norman, OK	SECN	W 35–9	83,331
November 2	7:30 p.m.	No. 10 Texas A&M		Williams–Brice Stadium; Columbia, SC (Bonham Trophy)	ABC	W 44–20	80,298
November 9	4:15 p.m.	at Vanderbilt		FirstBank Stadium; Nashville, TN	SECN	W 28–7	28,934
November 16	4:15 p.m.	No. 23 Missouri	No. 21	Williams–Brice Stadium; Columbia, SC (Mayor’s Cup)	SECN	W 34–30	79,361
November 23	4:00 p.m.	Wofford*	No. 18	Williams–Brice Stadium; Columbia, SC	SECN+	W 56–12	79,078
November 30	12:00 p.m.	at No. 12 Clemson*	No. 15	Memorial Stadium; Clemson, SC (Palmetto Bowl)	ESPN	W 17–14	81,500
December 31	3:00 p.m.	No. 20 Illinois	No. 15	Camping World Stadium; Orlando, FL (Citrus Bowl)	ABC	L 17–21	47,129
*Non-conference game; Rankings from AP Poll (and CFP Rankings, after November 5) - Released prior to game; All times are in Eastern time

== Game summaries ==
=== vs. Old Dominion ===
Old Dominion Monarchs (0–0) vs South Carolina Gamecocks (0–0) – Game summary

Quarter	1	2	3	4	Total
Monarchs	7	0	9	3	19
Gamecocks	10	3	3	7	23

at Williams–Brice Stadium • Columbia, South Carolina

- Date: August 31
- Game time: 4:15 p.m. (EDT)
- Game weather: Partly Cloudy • Temperature: 90 °F (32 °C) • Wind: E at 3 miles per hour (4.8 km/h)
- Game attendance: 78,496
- TV announcers (SECN): Dave Neal (play-by-play), Aaron Murray (analyst), and Ashley ShahAhmadi (sideline reporter)

Game information

First quarter

- (13:22) USC – Raheim Sanders 1-yard run (Alex Herrera kick) (Drive: 3 plays, 3 yards, 0:50; USC 7–0)
- (12:51) ODU – Isiah Paige 72-yard pass from Grant Wilson (Ethan Sanchez kick) (Drive: 2 plays, 75 yards, 0:31; Tied 7–7)
- (6:09) USC – Alex Herrera 40-yard field goal (Drive: 13 plays, 53 yards, 6:42; USC 10–7)

Second quarter

- (4:02) USC – Alex Herrera 46-yard field goal (Drive: 5 plays, 13 yards, 2:04; USC 13–7)

Third quarter

- (7:13) USC – Alex Herrera 33-yard field goal (Drive: 16 plays, 60 yards, 7:47; USC 16–7)
- (4:57) ODU – Grant Wilson 36-yard rush (Kick blocked) (Drive: 9 plays, 75 yards, 2:16; USC 16–13)
- (0:14) ODU – Ethan Sanchez 40-yard field goal (Drive: 8 plays, 47 yards, 1:49; Tied 16–16)

Fourth quarter

- (9:54) ODU – Ethan Sanchez 33-yard field goal (Drive: 13 plays, 42 yards, 4:19; ODU 19–16)
- (6:11) USC – LaNorris Sellers 1-yard run (Alex Herrera kick) (Drive: 2 plays, 6 yards, 0:37; USC 23–19)

Statistics	ODU	SCAR
First downs	17	18
Total yards	72–305	79–288
Rushing yards	34–108	56–174
Passing yards	197	114
Passing: Comp–Att–Int	22–38–2	10–23–0
Time of possession	24:14	35:46

Team	Category	Player	Statistics
Old Dominion	Passing	Grant Wilson	22/38, 197 yards, 1 TD, 2 INT
Old Dominion	Rushing	Aaron Young	16 carries, 56 yards
Old Dominion	Receiving	Isiah Paige	8 receptions, 115 yards, 1 TD
South Carolina	Passing	LaNorris Sellers	10/23, 114 yards
South Carolina	Rushing	Raheim Sanders	24 carries, 88 yards, 1 TD
South Carolina	Receiving	Vandrevius Jacobs	2 receptions, 59 yards

=== at Kentucky ===
South Carolina Gamecocks (1–0) at Kentucky Wildcats (1–0) – Game summary

Quarter	1	2	3	4	Total
Gamecocks	7	3	14	7	31
Wildcats	0	6	0	0	6

at Kroger Field • Lexington, Kentucky

- Date: September 7
- Game time: 3:30 p.m. (EDT)
- Game weather: Sunny • Temperature: 70 °F (21 °C) • Wind: N at 12 miles per hour (19 km/h)
- Game attendance: 61,349
- Referee: David Smith
- TV announcers (ABC): Sean McDonough (play-by-play), Greg McElroy (analyst), and Molly McGrath (sideline reporter)

Game information

First quarter

- (7:39) USC – Mazeo Bennett Jr. 24-yard pass from LaNorris Sellers (Alex Herrera kick) (Drive: 4 plays, 61 yards, 1:21; USC 7–0)

Second quarter

- (8:06) USC – Alex Herrera 29-yard field goal (Drive: 6 plays, 20 yards, 3:09; USC 10–0)
- (1:55) UK – Alex Raynor 32-yard field goal (Drive: 12 plays, 57 yards, 6:11; USC 10–3)
- (0:19) UK – Alex Raynor 39-yard field goal (Drive: 4 plays, 7 yards, 1:20; USC 10–6)

Third quarter

- (6:49) USC – Joshua Simon 16-yard pass from LaNorris Sellers (Alex Herrera kick) (Drive: 7 plays, 58 yards, 3:53; USC 17–6)
- (0:28) USC – Raheim Sanders 6-yard run (Alex Herrera kick) (Drive: 9 plays, 43 yards, 4:05; USC 24–6)

Fourth quarter

- (14:49) USC – Nick Emmanwori 24-yard interception return (Alex Herrera kick) (Drive: 2 plays, 2 yards, 0:39; USC 31–6)

Statistics	SCAR	UK
First downs	13	13
Total yards	50–252	63–183
Rushing yards	34–86	46–139
Passing yards	166	44
Passing: Comp–Att–Int	12–16–1	6–17–2
Time of possession	27:39	32:21

Team	Category	Player	Statistics
South Carolina	Passing	LaNorris Sellers	11/15, 159 yards, 2 TD, INT
South Carolina	Rushing	Raheim Sanders	13 carries, 54 yards, TD
South Carolina	Receiving	Mazeo Bennett Jr.	3 receptions, 63 yards, TD
Kentucky	Passing	Brock Vandagriff	3/10, 30 yards, INT
Kentucky	Rushing	Demie Sumo-Karngbaye	17 carries, 70 yards
Kentucky	Receiving	Dane Key	2 receptions, 36 yards

=== vs No. 16 LSU ===
No. 16 LSU Tigers (1-1) vs South Carolina Gamecocks (2-0) – Game summary

Quarter	1	2	3	4	Total
No. 16 Tigers	0	16	6	14	36
Gamecocks	7	17	0	9	33

at Williams–Brice Stadium • Columbia, South Carolina

- Date: September 14
- Game time: 12:00 p.m. (EDT)
- Game weather: Overcast, Partly cloudy, Humid
- Game attendance: 79,531
- Referee: Jason Autrey
- TV announcers (ABC): Chris Fowler (play-by-play), Kirk Herbstreit (analyst), and Holly Rowe (sideline)

Game information

First quarter

- (12:14) USC – LaNorris Sellers 4-yard run (Alex Herrera kick) (Drive: 7 plays, 75 yards, 2:46; USC 7–0)

Second quarter

- (13:49) USC – Alex Herrera 28-yard field goal (Drive: 13 plays, 65 yards, 6:24; USC 10–0)
- (12:19) USC – Raheim Sanders 10-yard run (Alex Herrera kick) (Drive: 1 play, 10 yards, 0:07; USC 17–0)
- (8:08) LSU – Caden Durham 26-yard run (Damian Ramos kick) (Drive: 8 plays, 75 yards, 4:11; USC 17–7)
- (4:28) LSU – Damian Ramos 28-yard field goal (Drive: 4 plays, 7 yards, 1:32; USC 17–10)
- (4:15) USC – LaNorris Sellers 75-yard run (Alex Herrera kick) (Drive: 1 play, 75 yards, 0:13; USC 24–10)
- (1:20) LSU – Kyren Lacy 12-yard pass from Garrett Nussmeier (two-point pass conversion failed) (Drive: 6 plays, 75 yards, 2:55; USC 24–16)

Third quarter

- (6:47) LSU – Caden Durham 9-yard run (two-point pass conversion failed) (Drive: 5 plays, 45 yards, 1:38; USC 24–22)

Fourth quarter

- (14:56) LSU – Mason Taylor 2-yard pass from Garrett Nussmeier (Damian Ramos kick) (Drive: 10 plays, 80 yards, 5:03; LSU 29–24)
- (13:51) USC – Raheim Sanders 66-yard run (two-point pass conversion failed) (Drive: 3 plays, 75 yards, 1:05; USC 30–29)
- (10:34) USC – Alex Herrera 42-yard field goal (Drive: 4 plays, 0 yards, 1:23; USC 33–29)
- (1:12) LSU – Josh Williams 2-yard run (Damian Ramos kick) (Drive: 8 plays, 55 yards, 2:34; LSU 36–33)

Statistics	LSU	SCAR
First downs	26	18
Total yards	82-417	64-398
Rushing yards	132	243
Passing yards	285	155
Passing: comp-att-INT	24-40-1	11–20–1
Time of possession	32:57	27:03

Team	Category	Player	Statistics
LSU	Passing	Garrett Nussmeier	24/40, 285 yards, 2 TD, INT
LSU	Rushing	Caden Durham	11 carries, 98 yards, 2 TD
LSU	Receiving	Aaron Anderson	5 receptions, 96 yards
South Carolina	Passing	LaNorris Sellers	9/16, 113 yards, INT
South Carolina	Rushing	Raheim Sanders	19 carries, 143 yards, 2 TD
South Carolina	Receiving	Jared Brown	3 receptions, 40 yards

=== vs Akron ===
Akron Zips (1-2) vs South Carolina Gamecocks (2-1) – Game summary

Quarter	1	2	3	4	Total
Zips	0	7	0	0	7
Gamecocks	15	7	7	21	50

at Williams–Brice Stadium • Columbia, South Carolina

- Date: September 21
- Game time: 7:30 (EDT)
- Game weather: Clear • Temperature: 81 °F (27 °C) • Wind: SSE at 3 miles per hour (4.8 km/h)
- Game attendance: 78,704
- Referee: Jeff Heaser
- TV announcers (ESPNU): Clay Matvick (play-by-play) and Steve Addazio (analyst)

Game information

First quarter

- (5:19) USC – Oscar Adaway III 2-yard run (Alex Herrera kick) (Drive: 13 plays, 89 yards, 5:38; USC 7–0)
- (0:53) USC – Mazeo Bennett Jr. 30-yard pass from Robby Ashford (Kai Kroeger Run for Two-Point Conversion) (Drive: 7 plays, 85 yards, 3:02; USC 15–0)

Second quarter

- (4:28) USC – Juju McDowell 12-yard pass from Robby Ashford (Alex Herrera kick) (Drive: 11 plays, 80 yards, 4:57; USC 22–0)
- (1:53) AKR – Adrian Norton 42-yard pass from Ben Finley (Garrison Smith kick) (Drive: 6 plays, 70 yards, 2:31; USC 22–7)

Third quarter

- (5:02) USC – Oscar Adaway III 2-yard run (Alex Herrera kick) (Drive: 7 plays, 84 yards, 3:43; USC 29–7)

Fourth quarter

- (13:14) USC – Robby Ashford 36-yard run (Alex Herrera kick) (Drive: 5 plays, 71 yards, 1:59; USC 36-7)
- (8:14) USC – Connor Cox 9-yard pass from Davis Beville (Alex Herrera kick) (Drive: 12 plays, 46 yards, 4:44; USC 43-7)
- (4:03) USC – Jawarn Howell 23-yard run (Alex Herrera kick) (Drive: 4 plays, 37 yards, 1:49; USC 50-7)

Statistics	AKR	SCAR
First downs	9	27
Total yards	51-154	80-549
Rushing yards	37	273
Passing yards	117	276
Passing: Comp–Att–Int	16-30-1	19-27
Time of possession	23:57	36:03

Team	Category	Player	Statistics
Akron	Passing	Ben Finley	14/27, 110 yards, 1 TD, 1 INT
Akron	Rushing	Jordon Simmons	6 carries, 19 yards
Akron	Receiving	Adrian Norton	4 receptions, 56 yards, 1 TD
South Carolina	Passing	Robby Ashford	15/21, 243 yards, 2 TD
South Carolina	Rushing	Robby Ashford	16 carries, 133 yards, TD
South Carolina	Receiving	Gage Larvadain	2 receptions, 79 yards

=== vs No. 12 Ole Miss ===
No. 12 Ole Miss Rebels (4-1) vs South Carolina Gamecocks (3-1) – Game summary

Quarter	1	2	3	4	Total
No. 12 Rebels	14	10	3	0	27
Gamecocks	0	3	0	0	3

at Williams–Brice Stadium • Columbia, South Carolina

- Date: October 5
- Game time: 3:30 p.m. (EDT)
- Game weather: Sunny, 83 °F (28 °C)
- Game attendance: 79,837
- Referee: David Smith
- TV announcers (ESPN): Dave Pasch (play-by-play), Dusty Dvoracek (analyst), and Taylor McGregor (sideline)

Game information

First quarter

- (10:36) Ole Miss - Henry Parrish Jr. 3 Yd Run (Caden Davis Kick) (Drive: 5 plays, 36 yards, 1:36; Ole Miss 7–0)
- (5:57) Ole Miss - JJ Pegues 1 Yd Run (Caden Davis Kick) (Drive: 8 plays, 59 yards, 3:07; Ole Miss 14–0)

Second quarter

- (10:08) South Carolina - Alex Herrera 40 Yd Field Goal (Drive: 5 plays, 25 yards, 1:49; Ole Miss 14–3)
- (7:16) Ole Miss - Caden Davis 24 Yd Field Goal (Drive: 8 plays, 68 yards, 2:52; Ole Miss 17–3)
- (0:31) Ole Miss - JJ Pegues 1 Yd Run (Caden Davis Kick) (Drive: 6 plays, 59 yards, 1:15; Ole Miss 24–3)

Third quarter

- (1:56) Ole Miss - Caden Davis 44 Yd Field Goal (Drive: 9 plays, 53 yards, 2:21; Ole Miss 27–3)

Fourth quarter

- No scoring plays

Statistics	MISS	SCAR
First downs	17	19
Total yards	68–425	76–313
Rushing yards	41–140	43–151
Passing yards	285	162
Passing: Comp–Att–Int	14–27–0	20–33–1
Time of possession	27:22	32:38

Team	Category	Player	Statistics
Ole Miss	Passing	Jaxson Dart	14–27, 285 yards
Ole Miss	Rushing	Henry Parrish Jr.	21 carries, 81 yards, 1 TD
Ole Miss	Receiving	Antwane Wells Jr.	3 receptions, 97 yards
South Carolina	Passing	LaNorris Sellers	20–32, 162 yards, 1 INT
South Carolina	Rushing	LaNorris Sellers	15 carries, 55 yards
South Carolina	Receiving	Mazeo Bennett Jr.	3 receptions, 41 yards

=== at No. 7 Alabama ===
South Carolina Gamecocks (3-2) at No. 7 Alabama Crimson Tide (4-1) – Game summary

Quarter	1	2	3	4	Total
Gamecocks	0	12	7	6	25
No. 7 Crimson Tide	7	7	0	13	27

at Bryant–Denny Stadium • Tuscaloosa, Alabama

- Date: October 12
- Game time: 12:00 p.m. (EDT)
- Game weather: Sunny • Temperature: 73 °F (23 °C) • Wind: N 1 mph
- Game attendance: 100,077
- Referee: Matt Loeffler
- TV announcers (ABC): Joe Tessitore (play-by-play), Jesse Palmer (analyst), and Katie George (sideline)

Game information

First quarter

- (11:00) ALA – Jalen Milroe 1-yard run, Graham Nicholson kick (Drive: 9 plays, 75 yards, 4:00; Alabama 7–0)

Second quarter

- (4:38) ALA – Justice Haynes 2-yard run, Graham Nicholson kick (Drive: 7 plays, 67 yards, 3:32; Alabama 14–0)
- (1:37) SCAR – Mazeo Bennett Jr. 36-yard pass from LaNorris Sellers, Alex Herrera kick (Drive: 10 plays, 75 yards, 3:01; Alabama 14–7)
- (1:28) SCAR – Team Safety (Alabama 14–9)
- (0:00) SCAR – Alex Herrera 37-yard field goal (Drive: 1 play, 0 yards, 0:01; Alabama 14–12)

Third quarter

- (6:20) SCAR – Raheim Sanders 1-yard run, Alex Herrera kick (Drive: 16 plays, 85 yards, 8:40; South Carolina 19–14)

Fourth quarter

- (10:42) ALA – Jalen Milroe 7-yard run, 2-PT failed (Drive: 3 plays, 31 yards, 1:23; Alabama 20–19)
- (1:54) ALA – Germie Bernard 34-yard pass from Jalen Milroe, Graham Nicholson kick (Drive: 10 plays, 67 yards, 4:14; Alabama 27–19)
- (0:43) SCAR – Nyck Harbor 31-yard pass from LaNorris Sellers, 2-PT failed (Drive: 6 plays, 75 yards, 1:11; Alabama 27–25)

Statistics	SCAR	ALA
First downs	23	20
Total yards	374	313
Rushing yards	132	104
Passing yards	242	209
Passing: Comp–Att–Int	24-32-1	16-23-2
Time of possession	31:40	28:20

Team	Category	Player	Statistics
South Carolina	Passing	LaNorris Sellers	23/31, 238 yards, 2 TD's, 1 INT
South Carolina	Rushing	Raheim Sanders	16 carries, 78 yards, 1 TD
South Carolina	Receiving	Mazeo Bennett Jr.	3 receptions, 57 yards, 1 TD
Alabama	Passing	Jalen Milroe	16/23, 209 yards, 1 TD, 2 INT's
Alabama	Rushing	Jam Miller	12 carries, 42 yards
Alabama	Receiving	Germie Bernard	4 receptions, 89 yards, 1 TD

=== at Oklahoma ===
South Carolina Gamecocks (3-3) at Oklahoma Sooners (4-2) – Game summary

Quarter	1	2	3	4	Total
Gamecocks	21	11	0	3	35
Sooners	0	3	6	0	9

at Gaylord Family Oklahoma Memorial Stadium • Norman, Oklahoma

- Date: October 19
- Game time: 12:45 p.m. (EDT)
- Game weather: Sunny • Temperature: 68
- Game attendance: 83,331
- Referee: Wayne Winkler
- TV announcers (SEC Network): Tom Hart (play-by-play), Cole Cubelic (analyst), and Alyssa Lang (sideline)

Game information

First quarter

- (12:33) USC – Raheim Sanders 3 yard rush, Alex Herrera kick (Drive: 5 plays, 41 yards, 2:13; USC 7–0)
- (11:21) USC – Tonka Hemingway 36 yard fumble return, Alex Herrera kick (Drive: 3 plays, 1 yards, 1:12; USC 14–0)
- (9:40) USC – Nick Emmanori 65 yard interception return, Alex Herrera kick (Drive: USC 21–0)

Second quarter

- (12:08) USC – Alex Herrera 39 yard field goal (Drive: 4 plays, 4 yards, 1:49; USC 24–0)
- (5:17) OKLA – Zach Schmit 44 yard field goal (Drive: 11 plays, 53 yards, 4:01; USC 24–3)
- (1:54) USC – Joshua Simon 33 yard pass from LaNorris Sellers, Maurice Brown rush (Drive: 8 plays, 75 yards, 3:23; USC 32–3)

Third quarter

- (7:33) OKLA – Brenen Thompson 54 yard pass from Jackson Arnold (Drive: 8 plays, 90 yards, 3:31; USC 32–9)

Fourth quarter

- (7:48) USC – Alex Herrera 33 yard field goal (Drive: 4 pays, 6 yards, 1:37; USC 35–9)

Statistics	SCAR	OU
First downs	15	19
Total yards	68–254	83–291
Rushing yards	41–74	41–53
Passing yards	180	238
Passing: Comp–Att–Int	17–27–0	22–42–2
Time of possession	31:47	28:13

Team	Category	Player	Statistics
South Carolina	Passing	LaNorris Sellers	16/24, 175 yards, TD
South Carolina	Rushing	Raheim Sanders	15 carries, 33 yards, TD
South Carolina	Receiving	Joshua Simon	4 receptions, 43 yards, TD
Oklahoma	Passing	Jackson Arnold	18/36, 225 yards, TD
Oklahoma	Rushing	Jovantae Barnes	17 carries, 70 yards
Oklahoma	Receiving	Jacob Jordan	6 receptions, 86 yards

=== vs No. 10 Texas A&M ===
No. 10 Texas A&M Aggies (7-1) vs South Carolina Gamecocks (4-3) – Game summary

Quarter	1	2	3	4	Total
No. 10 Aggies	3	17	0	0	20
Gamecocks	14	6	10	14	44

at Williams–Brice Stadium • Columbia, South Carolina

- Date: November 2
- Game time: 7:30 p.m.
- Game weather: Clear • Temperature: 71 °F (22 °C) • Wind: NE 3 mph
- Game attendance: 80,298
- Referee: Steve Marlowe
- TV announcers (ABC): Sean McDonough (play-by-play), Greg McElroy (analyst), and Molly McGrath (sideline reporter)

Game information
First quarter
- SCAR – LaNorris Sellers 23-yard run (Alex Herrera kick), 10:46. Gamecocks 7–0. Drive: 11 plays, 75 yards, 4:14.
- SCAR – Joshua Simon 15-yard pass from LaNorris Sellers (Alex Herrera kick), 8:24. Gamecocks 14–0. Drive: 2 plays, 34 yards, 0:47.
- TAMU – Randy Bond 52-yard field goal, 5:15. Gamecocks 14–3. Drive: 7 plays, 41 yards, 3:09.

Second quarter

- TAMU – Randy Bond 55-yard field goal, 13:12. Gamecocks 14–6. Drive: 8 plays, 42 yards, 2:46.
- SCAR – Alex Herrera 25-yard field goal, 8:45. Gamecocks 17–6. Drive: 10 plays, 68 yards, 4:27.
- TAMU – Amari Daniels 56-yard run (Randy Bond kick), 7:29. Gamecocks 17–13. Drive: 3 plays, 65 yards, 1:16.
- TAMU – Jabre Barber 2-yard pass from Marcel Reed (Randy Bond kick), 1:08. Aggies 20–17. Drive: 10 plays, 60 yards, 4:20.
- SCAR – Alex Herrera 44-yard field goal, 0:02. Tied 20–20. Drive: 6 plays, 49 yards, 1:06.

Third quarter

- SCAR – Raheim Sanders 52-yard run (Alex Herrera kick), 9:19. Gamecocks 27–20. Drive: 5 plays, 83 yards, 2:15.
- SCAR – Alex Herrera 43-yard field goal, 6:50. Gamecocks 30–20. Drive: 4 plays, 6 yards, 0:50.

Fourth quarter

- SCAR – Joshua Simon 57-yard pass from LaNorris Sellers (Alex Herrera kick), 3:24. Gamecocks 37–20. Drive: 5 plays, 85 yards, 1:48.
- SCAR – Raheim Sanders 7-yard run (Alex Herrera kick), 2:22. Gamecocks 44–20. Drive: 2 plays, 13 yards, 0:53.

Statistics	TAMU	SCAR
First downs	19	26
Total yards	350	530
Rushing yards	144	286
Passing yards	206	244
Passing: Comp–Att–Int	18-28-1	13–27–0
Time of possession	30:48	29:12

Team	Category	Player	Statistics
Texas A&M	Passing	Marcel Reed	18/28, 206 yards, 1 TD, 1 INT
Texas A&M	Rushing	Amari Daniels	13 carries, 83 yards, 1 TD
Texas A&M	Receiving	Jabre Barber	7 receptions, 80 yards, 1 TD
South Carolina	Passing	LaNorris Sellers	13/27, 244 yards, 2 TD
South Carolina	Rushing	Raheim Sanders	20 carries, 144 yards, 2 TD
South Carolina	Receiving	Joshua Simon	4 receptions, 132 yards, 2 TD

=== at Vanderbilt ===
South Carolina Gamecocks (5-3) at Vanderbilt Commodores (6-3) – Game summary

Quarter	1	2	3	4	Total
Gamecocks	0	7	14	7	28
Commodores	0	0	7	0	7

at FirstBank Stadium • Nashville, Tennessee

- Date: November 9
- Game time: 4:15 p.m.
- Game weather: Rain, 68 °F (20 °C)
- Game attendance: 28,934
- Referee: David Smith
- TV announcers (SECN): Dave Neal (play-by-play), Aaron Murray (analyst), and Ashley ShahAhmadi (sideline reporter)

Game information
First quarter
- No scoring plays

Second quarter

- SCAR – Joshua Simon 17-yard pass from LaNorris Sellers (Alex Herrera kick), 13:11. Gamecocks 7–0. Drive: 12 plays, 81 yards, 4:45.

Third quarter

- SCAR – Raheim Sanders 33-yard run (Alex Herrera kick), 13:22. Gamecocks 14–0. Drive: 3 plays, 75 yards, 1:38.
- VAN – Diego Pavia 17-yard run (Brock Taylor kick), 8:08. Gamecocks 14–7. Drive: 10 plays, 75 yards, 5:13.
- SCAR – Raheim Sanders 1-yard run (Alex Herrera kick), 4:07. Gamecocks 21–7. Drive: 8 plays, 75 yards, 4:01.

Fourth quarter

- SCAR – Raheim Sanders 43-yard pass from LaNorris Sellers (Alex Herrera kick), 7:55. Gamecocks 28–7. Drive: 2 plays, 61 yards, 1:20.

Statistics	SCAR	VAN
First downs	25	17
Total yards	452	274
Rushing yards	214	108
Passing yards	238	166
Passing: Comp–Att–Int	14-20	16–31
Time of possession	30:59	29:01

Team	Category	Player	Statistics
South Carolina	Passing	LaNorris Sellers	14/20, 238 yards, 2 TD
South Carolina	Rushing	Raheim Sanders	15 carries, 126 yards, 2 TD
South Carolina	Receiving	Raheim Sanders	2 receptions, 52 yards, 1 TD
Vanderbilt	Passing	Diego Pavia	16/31, 166 yards
Vanderbilt	Rushing	Diego Pavia	13 carries, 65 yards, 1 TD
Vanderbilt	Receiving	Eli Stowers	4 receptions, 41 yards

=== vs No. 23 Missouri ===
No. 23 Missouri Tigers (7-2) vs No. 21 South Carolina Gamecocks (6-3) – Game summary

Quarter	1	2	3	4	Total
No. 23 Tigers	6	0	6	18	30
No. 21 Gamecocks	7	14	0	13	34

at Williams–Brice Stadium • Columbia, South Carolina

- Date: November 16
- Game time: 4:15 p.m.
- Game weather: Sunny, 66 °F (19 °C), NW 4 mph (6.4 km/h)
- Game attendance: 79,361
- Referee: Lee Hedrick
- TV announcers (SECN): Tom Hart (play-by-play), Jordan Rodgers (analyst), and Cole Cubelic (sideline reporter)

Game information

First quarter

- (10:00) MIZ: Blake Craig 38 yard Field Goal. 3-0 Missouri
- (7:27) SCAR: Nyck Harbor 26 yard pass from LaNorris Sellers (Alex Herrera Kick). 7-3 South Carolina
- (2:41) MIZ: Blake Craig 37 yard Field Goal. 7-6 South Carolina

Second quarter

- (1:57) SCAR: Joshua Simon 6 yard pass from LaNorris Sellers (Alex Herrera Kick). 14-6 South Carolina
- (0:39) SCAR: Jared Brown 38 yard pass from LaNorris Sellers (Alex Herrera Kick). 21-6 South Carolina

Third quarter

- (4:54) MIZ: Marcus Carroll 2 yard run (Two-point Run Conversion Failed). 21-12 South Carolina

Fourth quarter

- (12:49) MIZ: Blake Craig 25 yard Field Goal. 21-15 South Carolina
- (9:12) MIZ: Nate Noel 1 yard run (Blake Craig Kick). 22-21 Missouri
- (5:04) SCAR: Michael Smith 5 yard pass from LaNorris Sellers (Two-Point Pass Conversion Failed). 27-22 South Carolina
- (1:10) MIZ: Luther Burden III 37 yard pass from Brady Cook (Jamal Roberts Run for Two-Point Conversion). 30-27 Missouri
- (0:15) SCAR: Raheim Sanders 15 yard pass from LaNorris Sellers (Alex Herrera Kick). 34-30 South Carolina

Statistics	MIZZ	SCAR
First downs	20	22
Total yards	381	462
Rushing yards	144	109
Passing yards	237	353
Passing: Comp–Att–Int	21-31-1	21-30-1
Time of possession	31:44	28:16

Team	Category	Player	Statistics
Missouri	Passing	Brady Cook	21/31, 237 yards, TD, INT
Missouri	Rushing	Nate Noel	27 carries, 150 yards, TD
Missouri	Receiving	Theo Wease Jr.	6 receptions, 85 yards
South Carolina	Passing	LaNorris Sellers	21/30, 353 yards, 5 TD, INT
South Carolina	Rushing	Raheim Sanders	19 carries, 53 yards
South Carolina	Receiving	Dalevon Campbell	2 receptions, 86 yards

=== vs Wofford (FCS) ===
Wofford Terriers (FCS) (5-6) vs No. 18 South Carolina Gamecocks (7-3) – Game summary

Quarter	1	2	3	4	Total
Terriers (FCS)	3	6	0	3	12
No. 18 Gamecocks	7	14	14	21	56

at Williams–Brice Stadium • Columbia, South Carolina

- Date: November 23
- Game time: 4:00 p.m. (EST)
- Game weather: Sunny • Temperature: 60 °F (16 °C) • Wind: W 6 mph
- Game attendance: 79,078
- Referee: Ken Williamson
- TV announcers (SECN+): Jay Alter (play-by-play), Rocky Boiman (analyst), and Ashley Stroehlein (sideline)

Game information
First quarter
- (12:34) WOFF – Devery Cagle 27-yard field goal (Drive: 5 plays, 66 yards, 2:26; Wofford 3–0)
- (1:48) SCAR – Raheim Sanders 11-yard run, Alex Herrera kick (Drive: 17 plays, 90 yards, 8:47; South Carolina 7–3)

Second quarter

- (12:02) SCAR – LaNorris Sellers 1-yard run, Alex Herrera kick (Drive: 5 plays, 71 yards, 2:12; South Carolina 14–3)
- (1:48) WOFF – Dylan Djete 6-yard pass from Amari Odom, 2-PT failed (Drive: 10 plays, 57 yards, 5:06; South Carolina 14–9)
- (0:20) SCAR – Maurice Brown II 1-yard pass from LaNorris Sellers, Alex Herrera kick (Drive: 8 plays, 68 yards, 1:21; South Carolina 21–9)

Third quarter

- (11:31) SCAR – Nyck Harbor 26-yard pass from LaNorris Sellers, Alex Herrera kick (Drive: 9 plays, 82 yards, 3:23; South Carolina 28–9)
- (3:00) SCAR – Gage Larvadain 13-yard pass from LaNorris Sellers, Alex Herrera kick (Drive: 11 plays, 70 yards, 5:23; South Carolina 35–9)

Fourth quarter

- (13:29) WOFF – Devery Cagle 28-yard field goal (Drive: 8 plays, 34 yards, 3:22; South Carolina 35–12)
- (10:27) SCAR – Robby Ashford 5-yard run, Alex Herrera kick (Drive: 7 plays, 70 yards, 2:48; South Carolina 42–12)
- (7:04) SCAR – Jawarn Howell 27-yard run, Alex Herrera kick (Drive: 5 plays, 70 yards, 1:32; South Carolina 49–12)
- (0:09) SCAR – Bradley Dunn 5-yard run, Alex Herrera kick (Drive: 10 plays, 85 yards, 3:59; South Carolina 56–12)

Statistics	WOFF	SCAR
First downs	14	34
Total yards	247	608
Rushing yards	28	265
Passing yards	219	343
Passing: Comp–Att–Int	17–31–0	27–32–1
Time of possession	28:00	32:00

Team	Category	Player	Statistics
Wofford	Passing	Amari Odom	15/28, 215 yards, TD
Wofford	Rushing	Ryan Ingram	14 carries, 25 yards
Wofford	Receiving	Kyle Watkins	6 receptions, 133 yards
South Carolina	Passing	LaNorris Sellers	23/27, 307 yards, 3 TD, INT
South Carolina	Rushing	Raheim Sanders	15 carries, 72 yards, TD
South Carolina	Receiving	Dalevon Campbell	5 receptions, 120 yards

=== at No. 12 Clemson (rivalry) ===
No. 15 South Carolina Gamecocks (8-3) at No. 12 Clemson Tigers (9-2) – Game summary

Quarter	1	2	3	4	Total
No. 15 Gamecocks	0	7	0	10	17
No. 12 Tigers	0	7	7	0	14

at Memorial Stadium • Clemson, South Carolina

- Date: November 30
- Game time: 12:00 p.m. (EDT)
- Game weather: Temperature: 46 °F (8 °C) • Wind: W 4 mph • Weather: Sunny
- Game attendance: 81,500
- Referee: Kyle Olson
- TV announcers (ESPN): Roy Philpott (play-by-play), Sam Acho (analyst), and Taylor Davis (sideline)

Game information
First quarter
- No scoring plays

Second quarter

- (12:07) Clemson – Cade Klubnik 13-yard rush, Nolan Hauser kick (Drive: 3 plays, 57 yards, 1:25; Clemson 7–0)
- (09:20) South Carolina – LaNorris Sellers 25-yard rush, Alex Herrera kick (Drive: 6 plays, 75 yards, 2:47; Tied 7–7)

Third quarter

- (09:57) Clemson – Klubnik 18-yard rush, Hauser kick (Drive: 11 plays, 75 yards, 5:03; Clemson 14–7)

Fourth quarter

- (06:48) South Carolina – Herrera 42-yard field goal (Drive: 6 plays, 32 yards, 2:30; Clemson 14–10)
- (01:08) South Carolina – Sellers 20-yard rush, Herrera kick (Drive: 9 plays, 75 yards, 4:01; South Carolina 17–14)

Statistics	SCAR	CLEM
First downs	20	22
Total yards	431	419
Rushing yards	267	139
Passing yards	164	280
Passing: Comp–Att–Int	13-21-1	24-36-1
Time of possession	30:37	29:23

Team	Category	Player	Statistics
South Carolina	Passing	LaNorris Sellers	13/21, 164 yards, 1 INT
South Carolina	Rushing	LaNorris Sellers	16 carries, 166 yards, 2 TD
South Carolina	Receiving	Nyck Harbor	3 receptions, 51 yards
Clemson	Passing	Cade Klubnik	24/36, 280 yards, 1 INT
Clemson	Rushing	Phil Mafah	20 carries, 66 yards
Clemson	Receiving	Antonio Williams	8 receptions, 99 yards

=== vs No. 20 Illinois (Citrus Bowl) ===
2024 Citrus Bowl
No. 15 South Carolina Gamecocks (9–3) vs No. 20 Illinois Fighting Illini (9–3) – Game summary

Quarter	1	2	3	4	Total
No. 15 Gamecocks	3	0	7	7	17
No. 20 Fighting Illini	7	0	7	7	21

at Camping World Stadium • Orlando, Florida

- Date: Tuesday, December 31, 2024
- Game time: 3:00 p.m. EST
- Game attendance: 47,129
- TV announcers (ABC): Mark Jones (play-by-play), Roddy Jones (analyst), and Quint Kessenich (sideline) (ABC)/Sean Kelley (play-by-play), Rene Ingoglia (analyst), and Marilyn Payne (sideline) (ESPN Radio)

Game information

First quarter

- (7:24) SCAR – Alex Herrera 29-yard field goal (Drive: 11 plays, 47 yards, 5:48; South Carolina 3–0)
- (0:00) ILL – Zakhari Franklin 15–yard pass from Luke Altmyer, David Olano kick (Drive: 11 plays, 66 yards, 5:13; Illinois 7–3)

Second quarter

- No scoring plays

Third quarter

- (10:50) SCAR – Oscar Adaway III 36-yard run, Alex Herrera kick (Drive: 5 plays, 58 yards, 1:24; South Carolina 10–7)
- (2:23) ILL – Josh McCray 3-yard run, David Olano kick (Drive: 9 plays, 63 yards, 4:36; Illinois 14–10)

Fourth quarter

- (14:56) SCAR – Joshua Simon 6-yard pass from LaNorris Sellers, Alex Herrera kick (Drive: 5 plays, 75 yards, 2:27; South Carolina 17–14)
- (7:29) ILL – Josh McCray 9-yard run, David Olano kick (Drive: 12 plays, 75 yards, 7:27; Illinois 21–17)

Statistics	SCAR	ILL
First downs	20	22
Total yards	390	357
Rushing yards	130	183
Passing yards	260	174
Passing: Comp–Att–Int	24/35	13/22
Time of possession	31:16	28:44

Team	Category	Player	Statistics
South Carolina	Passing	LaNorris Sellers	24/34, 260 yards, TD
South Carolina	Rushing	Oscar Adaway III	14 Carries, 69 yards, TD
South Carolina	Receiving	Joshua Simon	6 Receptions, 69 yards, TD
Illinois	Passing	Luke Altmyer	13/22, 174 yards, TD, INT
Illinois	Rushing	Josh McCray	13 Carries, 114 yards, 2 TD
Illinois	Receiving	Hank Beatty	4 Receptions, 90 yards

== Potential College Football Playoff inclusion ==
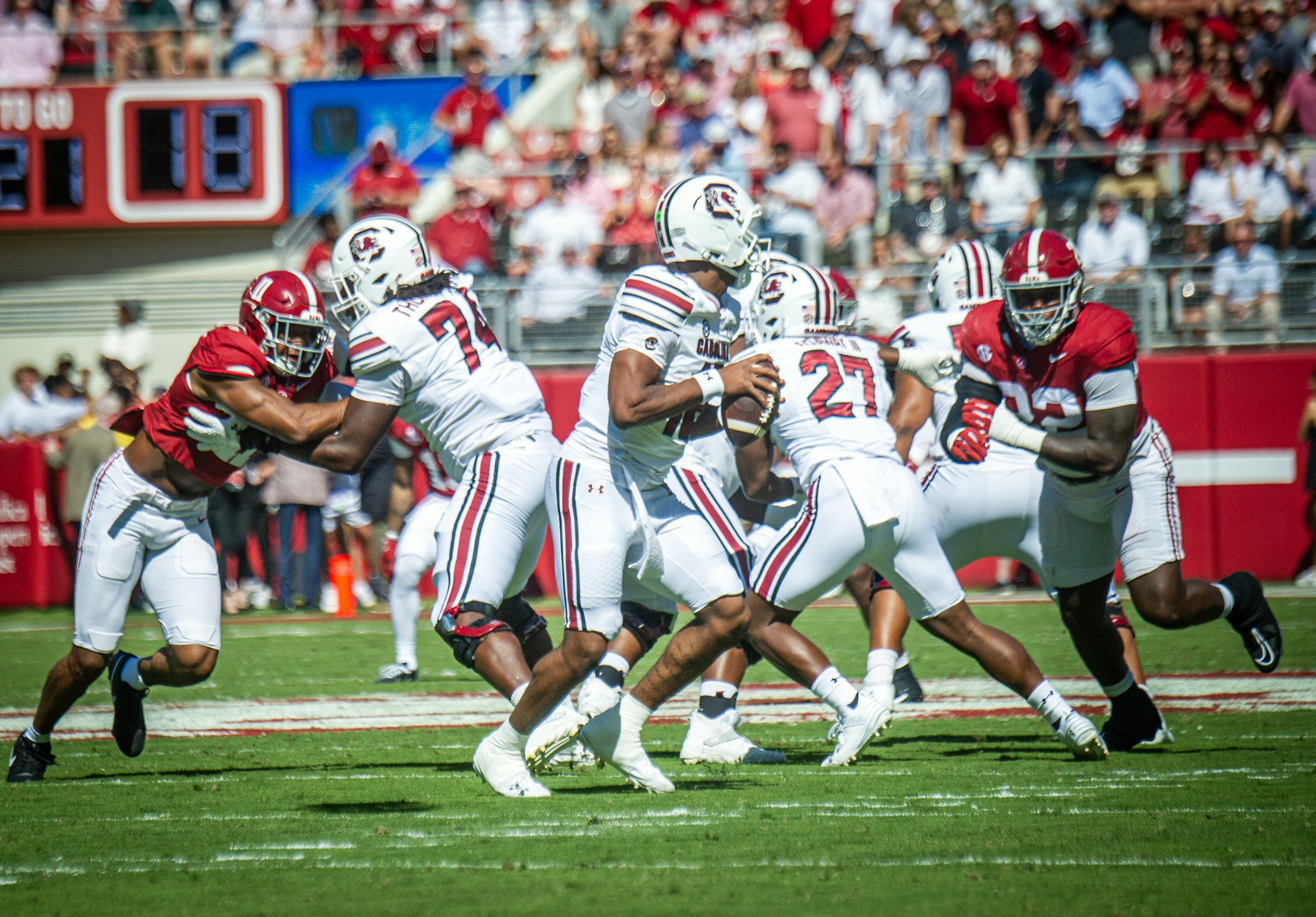
Beamer used South Carolina having only one road loss, to Alabama, as an argument for their inclusion in the CFP

In January 2024, despite the program just finishing a 5–7 season, South Carolina freshman Dylan Stewart made it clear to his head coach, Shane Beamer, that the team had high expectations for the next postseason. Meeting these expectations would be difficult as the Gamecocks had three losses halfway through the 2024 season, making their inclusion in the newly expanded College Football Playoff unlikely.

However, with South Carolina having more success in the second half of the regular season, they clawed their way into CFP contention. On November 12, following a three-game winning streak and "many national college football analysts [starting] to recognize them as currently playing some of the best ball in the country", the Gamecocks made their debut in the CFP rankings: No. 21 in the second week of the rankings. It was South Carolina's first CFP ranking since 2022, and their earliest-ever appearance in the CFP rankings. ESPN gave South Carolina a 14% chance of making the playoff, but a 47% chance if it won out, saying that the possibility of a three-loss SEC team making the playoff could not be ruled out. Leading up to the final game of the regular season, the Gamecocks continued winning and climbed up to No. 15 in the rankings. ESPN gave South Carolina a 58% chance to make the CFP if they defeated No. 12 Clemson on the road, which they did, finishing the regular season with a 9–3 record and six-game winning streak.

Arguments for South Carolina's inclusion in the CFP included: strength of schedule (No. 15 in FBS, higher than Alabama and Ole Miss), 4–1 record in "hostile" road games, the one road loss being by only two points, having only two close road games, being arguably one of the country's best teams despite their record, being arguably the country's "hottest" team, four ranked wins, the lack of a "truly ugly" loss, two of the losses being by five combined points to SEC teams, a road win over the ACC champion, wins over teams which beat Alabama and Ole Miss, and the loss to LSU "deserving scrutiny" (due to officiating controversies and the injury of quarterback LaNorris Sellers).

South Carolina was ranked No. 14 in the penultimate rankings, at which point it became clear they were "essentially eliminated". The Gamecocks were ranked No. 15 in the final rankings, and thus did not join the tournament. They were instead invited to the Citrus Bowl, where they lost to Illinois.

== Rankings ==
Ranking movements Legend: ██ Increase in ranking ██ Decrease in ranking — = Not ranked RV = Received votes
	Week																
Poll	Pre	1	2	3	4	5	6	7	8	9	10	11	12	13	14	15	Final
AP	—	—	RV	RV	RV	RV	—	—	RV	RV	RV	23	19	16	13	14	19
Coaches	RV	—	RV	—	RV	RV	—	—	—	—	RV	23	19	14	12	14	19
CFP	Not released										—	21	18	15	14	15	Not released

== See also ==
- 1987 South Carolina Gamecocks football team, to whom the 2024 team has been compared
