= Kam Franklin (American football) =

American football player (born 2005)

No. 5 – Ole Miss Rebels
- Position: Defensive end
- Class: Junior

Personal information
- Born: November 28, 2005 (age 20)
- Listed height: 6 ft 5 in (1.96 m)
- Listed weight: 295 lb (134 kg)

Career information
- High school: Lake Cormorant (Lake Cormorant, Mississippi)
- College: Ole Miss (2024–present)
- Stats at ESPN

Kamarion Nikel Franklin (born November 28, 2005) is an American college football defensive end for the Ole Miss Rebels.

== Early life ==
Franklin is from Lake Cormorant, Mississippi. He grew up playing football and attended Lake Cormorant High School, where he competed in football and basketball. He had begun as a running back before switching to defensive lineman toward the end of his freshman season. As a sophomore, he posted 71 tackles, 13.5 tackles-for-loss (TFLs), 11 sacks and four interceptions.

Franklin then was named Mississippi 5A Defensive Player of the Year as a junior, when he set a school record with 19 sacks and also tallied 93 tackles, 22 TFLs and three blocked kicks. He then made 75 tackles, seven TFLs and four sacks as a senior in 2023, concluding his high school career with 225 tackles and 36 sacks. He was selected to the Under Armour All-America Game and the Mississippi-Alabama All-Star game. Franklin was ranked a five-star recruit, the top player in the state, one of the top-10 players at his position, and a top-50 player nationally. He committed to play college football for the Ole Miss Rebels.

== College career ==
As a true freshman in 2024, Franklin was a backup to future NFL draft picks Walter Nolen, JJ Pegues, and Princely Umanmielen, finishing the season with 11 tackles, five TFLs and 2.5 sacks in seven games played. With each of those players graduating the next year, Franklin saw more significant playing time in the 2025 season.
