= Walter Nolen =

American football player (born 2003)

No. 97 – Arizona Cardinals
- Position: Defensive tackle
- Roster status: Active

Personal information
- Born: October 14, 2003 (age 23)
- Listed height: 6 ft 4 in (1.93 m)
- Listed weight: 300 lb (136 kg)

Career information
- High school: Powell (Powell, Tennessee)
- College: Texas A&M (2022–2023); Ole Miss (2024)
- NFL draft: 2025: 1st round, 16th overall pick

Career history
- Arizona Cardinals (2025–present)

Awards and highlights
- Consensus All-American (2024); First-team All-SEC (2024)

Career NFL statistics as of Week 1, 2026
- Tackles: 12
- Sacks: 2
- Fumble recoveries: 1
- Pass deflections: 2
- Defensive touchdowns: 1
- Stats at Pro Football Reference

Walter Nolen III (born October 14, 2003) is an American professional football defensive tackle for the Arizona Cardinals of the National Football League (NFL). He played college football for the Texas A&M Aggies and Ole Miss Rebels, earning consensus All-American honors with the latter in 2024. Nolen was selected by the Cardinals in the first round of the 2025 NFL draft.

== Early life ==
Nolen played high school football at three different schools: Olive Branch High School in Olive Branch, Mississippi, as a freshman and sophomore; Saint Benedict at Auburndale in Memphis as a junior; and Powell High School in Powell, Tennessee, as a senior. He also enrolled for a time at IMG Academy but did not play there. His coach at Powell, Matt Lowe, described him as "a young man who has been blessed with size, speed and athleticism."

In his senior year at Powell, Nolen had 93 tackles, 33 tackles for loss, 27 quarterback hurries, and 17 sacks. After the season, he was invited to play in the Under Armour All-America Game. Nolen was named USA Today High School Defensive Football Player of the Year and was rated as the country's top recruit of the 2022 class by the same publication.

=== Recruiting ===
Nolen was rated by ESPN as the No. 1 football recruit in the 2022 recruiting class. He was ranked No. 2 by Rivals.com and 247Sports, behind Travis Hunter. Nolen received offers from numerous schools and narrowed his final five to Alabama, Florida, Georgia, Michigan, and Tennessee. In November 2021, Nolen committed to play college football for Texas A&M. He later paid an official visit to Tennessee, raising speculation that his commitment was uncertain. He then signed his letter of intent with Texas A&M in December 2021. He was part of a recruiting class at Texas A&M that was rated as the best in the history of recruiting rankings.

== College career ==
On December 24, 2023, Nolen announced he would transfer to Ole Miss. At the conclusion of the 2024 season, Nolen was named a consensus first team All-American.

=== College statistics ===
Year	Team	GP	Tackles				Fumbles				Interceptions			
Year	Team	GP	Cmb	Solo	Ast	Sck	FF	FR	Yds	TD	Int	Yds	TD	PD
2022	Texas A&M	10	29	17	12	1.0	1	1	9	0	0	0	0	0
2023	Texas A&M	12	37	20	17	4.0	0	0	0	0	0	0	0	1
2024	Ole Miss	13	48	25	23	6.5	0	2	0	0	0	0	0	3
Career		35	114	62	52	11.5	1	3	9	0	0	0	0	3

== Professional career ==
Pre-draft measurables
Height	Weight	Arm length	Hand span	Wingspan	20-yard shuttle	Bench press
6 ft 3 3/4 in (1.92 m)	296 lb (134 kg)	32 1/2 in (0.83 m)	9 1/2 in (0.24 m)	6 ft 6 5/8 in (2.00 m)	4.76 s	27 reps
All values from NFL Combine/Pro Day

Nolen was drafted in the first round with the 16th overall pick by the Arizona Cardinals in the 2025 NFL draft. He began his rookie season on the reserve/PUP list due to a calf injury suffered before training camp. Nolen was activated on November 3, ahead of the team's Week 9 matchup against the Dallas Cowboys. In Week 12 against the Jacksonville Jaguars, Nolen recorded his first career touchdown after recovering and returning a Trevor Lawrence fumble seven yards. In six appearances during his rookie campaign, he recorded two pass deflections, the fumble recovery touchdown, two sacks, and 11 combined tackles. On December 22, Nolen was placed on season-ending injured reserve due to a knee injury he suffered in Week 16 against the Atlanta Falcons.
