= Diego Pounds =

American football player (born 2002)

No. 61 – Kansas City Chiefs
- Position: Offensive tackle
- Roster status: Active

Personal information
- Born: December 12, 2002 (age 23); Atlanta, Georgia, U.S.
- Listed height: 6 ft 6 in (1.98 m)
- Listed weight: 335 lb (152 kg)

Career information
- High school: Millbrook (Raleigh, North Carolina)
- College: North Carolina (2021–2023); Ole Miss (2024–2025)
- NFL draft: 2026: undrafted

Career history
- Baltimore Ravens (2026)*; Kansas City Chiefs (2026–present)
- * Offseason or practice squad member only

Awards and highlights
- Third-team All-SEC (2025)
- Stats at Pro Football Reference

Diego Lanzell Pounds (born December 12, 2002) is an American professional football offensive tackle for the Kansas City Chiefs of the National Football League (NFL). He played college football for the North Carolina Tar Heels and Ole Miss Rebels.

== Early life ==
Pounds was born on December 12, 2002, in Atlanta, Georgia, and raised by his mother. He moved to Raleigh, North Carolina, when he was eight, and grew up playing basketball. He attended Millbrook High School where he initially was only going to play basketball, but joined the football team as his brother was a member of the squad. Pounds played junior varsity football from 2017 to 2018 as a defensive lineman before joining the varsity team near the end of his sophomore year. As a junior, Pounds became an offensive lineman. He helped the team reach the NCHSAA 4AA state playoffs that season, but did not play his senior year as it was postponed to 2021 and he graduated early. A three-star recruit, Pounds committed to play college football for the North Carolina Tar Heels.

== College career ==
Pounds redshirted as a true freshman at North Carolina in 2021, then appeared in five games as a backup in 2022. In 2023, he served as the team's starting left tackle. He started eight of 13 games for the Tar Heels in 2023. Pounds entered the NCAA transfer portal following the season and transferred to the Ole Miss Rebels in 2024. He started nine of 13 games during the 2024 season. As a senior in 2025, he started 15 games at left tackle, earning third-team All-Southeastern Conference (SEC) honors. Finishing his collegiate career with 46 games played, 32 as a starter, he was invited to the 2026 East–West Shrine Bowl.

== Professional career ==
Pre-draft measurables
Height	Weight	Arm length	Hand span	Wingspan	40-yard dash	10-yard split	20-yard split	20-yard shuttle	Three-cone drill	Vertical jump	Broad jump	Bench press
6 ft 6 in (1.98 m)	325 lb (147 kg)	33 3/4 in (0.86 m)	9 3/4 in (0.25 m)	7 ft 0 1/4 in (2.14 m)	5.15 s	1.77 s	2.95 s	4.78 s	7.90 s	30.0 in (0.76 m)	9 ft 4 in (2.84 m)	21 reps
All values from NFL Combine/Pro Day

=== Baltimore Ravens ===
Pounds signed with the Baltimore Ravens as an undrafted free agent on April 26, 2026.

=== Kansas City Chiefs ===
On August 30, 2026, Pounds was traded to the Kansas City Chiefs in exchange for a 2028 sixth-round pick.
