= Louis Moore (American football) =

American football player (born 2001)

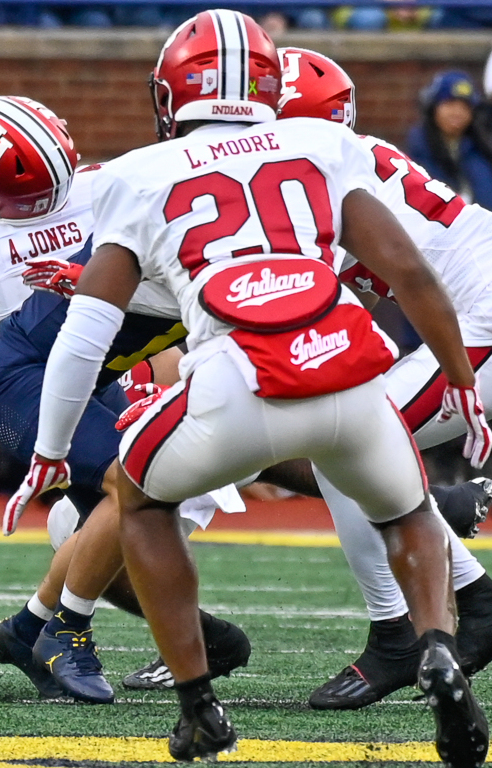
- Moore in 2023

Profile
- Position: Safety

Personal information
- Born: January 29, 2001 (age 25)
- Listed height: 5 ft 11 in (1.80 m)
- Listed weight: 190 lb (86 kg)

Career information
- High school: Poteet (Mesquite, Texas)
- College: Navarro (2019–2021); Indiana (2022–2023, 2025); Ole Miss (2024)
- NFL draft: 2026: undrafted

Career history
- Miami Dolphins (2026)*
- * Offseason or practice squad member only

Awards and highlights
- CFP national champion (2025); First-team All-American (2025); First-team All-Big Ten (2025)
- Stats at ESPN

Louis Moore (born January 29, 2001) is an American professional football safety. He played college football for the Ole Miss Rebels, Navarro Bulldogs, and Indiana Hoosiers.

== Early life ==
Moore attended Poteet High School in Mesquite, Texas. He committed to play college football at Navarro College.

== College career ==
=== Navarro College ===
During his three years at Navarro from 2019 through 2021, he redshirted and played sparingly due to injuries and the cancellation of the 2020 season due to the COVID-19 pandemic.

=== Indiana (first stint) ===
After playing three years at Navarro as a wide receiver and safety, Moore committed to play for the Indiana Hoosiers. In his first season with the Hoosiers in 2022, he tallied nine tackles with one being for a loss. In week 3 of the 2023 season, Moore racked up nine tackles and recovered an onside kick in a 21–14 loss to Louisville. That season, he played in all 12 games with ten starts totaling 82 tackles with one being for a loss, three interceptions, and a forced fumble. After the season, Moore entered his name into the NCAA transfer portal.

=== Ole Miss ===
Moore transferred to play for the Ole Miss Rebels. In 2024, he recorded 36 tackles with two going for a loss, and a pass deflection in 11 games. After the season, Moore once again entered his name into the NCAA transfer portal.

=== Indiana (second stint) ===
Moore transferred to play for the Indiana Hoosiers again. Heading into the season he was ruled ineligible due to using up all of his eligibility, but he sued the NCAA, arguing that his JUCO seasons should not count towards his eligibility, where he would gain his eligibility for the season, based on the Diego Pavia case. In the 2025 season opener, Moore put up seven tackles and an interception in a win over Old Dominion. In week seven, he recorded an interception in an upset win over Oregon. In week 10 of the 2025 season, Moore notched an interception a blowout 55–10 win over Maryland.

== Professional career ==
Pre-draft measurables
Height	Weight	Arm length	Hand span	Wingspan	40-yard dash	10-yard split	20-yard split	20-yard shuttle	Three-cone drill	Vertical jump	Bench press
5 ft 10 3/4 in (1.80 m)	191 lb (87 kg)	29 1/2 in (0.75 m)	9 7/8 in (0.25 m)	6 ft 0 1/2 in (1.84 m)	4.63 s	1.59 s	2.71 s	4.26 s	6.97 s	34.0 in (0.86 m)	17 reps
All values from NFL Combine/Pro Day

On May 8, 2026, Moore signed with the Miami Dolphins as an undrafted free agent. He was waived by the Dolphins on August 29.
