= Antwane Wells Jr. =

American football player (born 2001)

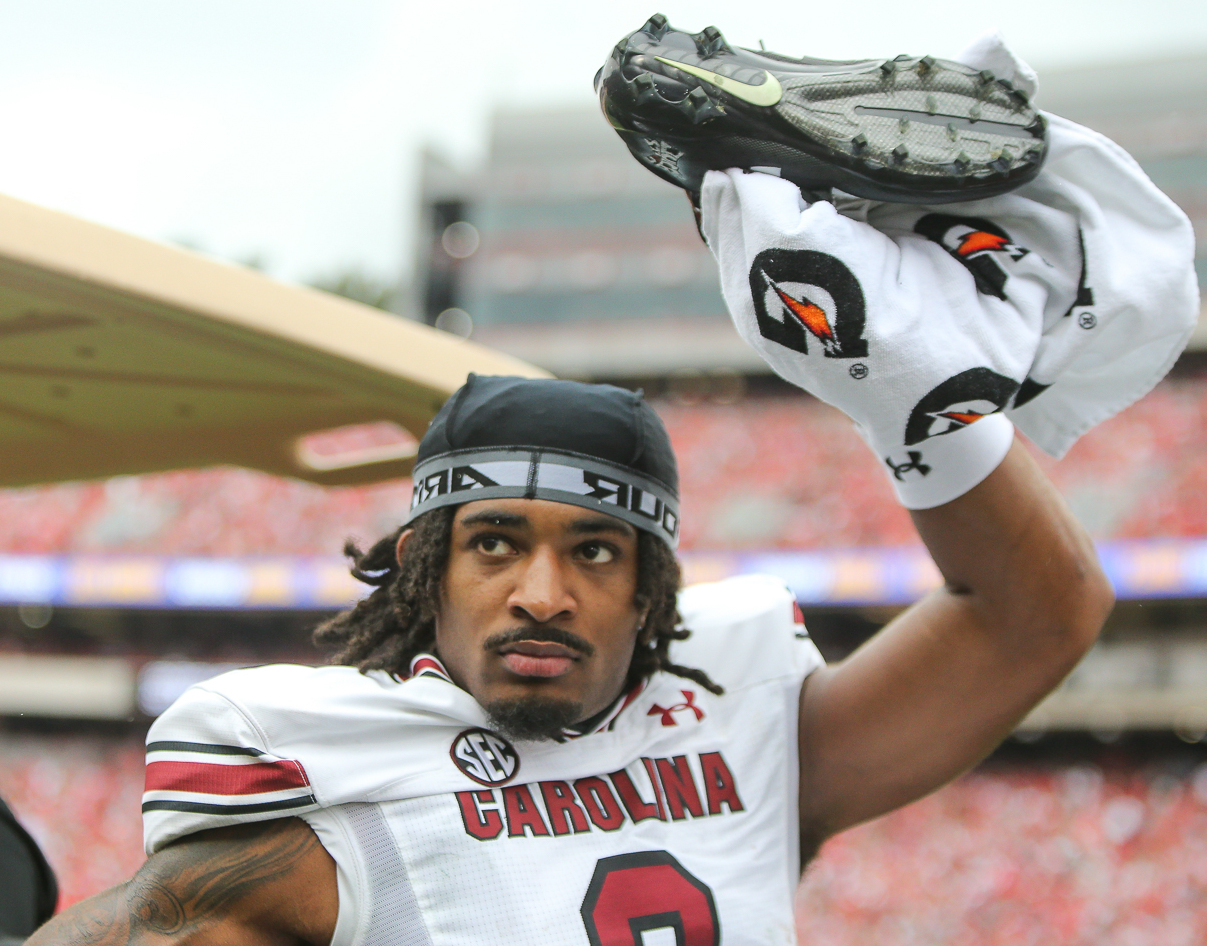
- Wells with the South Carolina Gamecocks in 2023

No. 82 – Atlanta Falcons
- Position: Wide receiver
- Roster status: Practice squad

Personal information
- Born: April 2, 2001 (age 25); Richmond, Virginia, U.S.
- Listed height: 6 ft 1 in (1.85 m)
- Listed weight: 204 lb (93 kg)

Career information
- High school: Highland Springs (Highland Springs, Virginia)
- College: James Madison (2020–2021); South Carolina (2022–2023); Ole Miss (2024)
- NFL draft: 2025: undrafted

Career history
- New York Giants (2025)*; Columbus Aviators (2026); Atlanta Falcons (2026–present)*
- * Offseason or practice squad member only

Awards and highlights
- First-team All-SEC (2022)
- Stats at Pro Football Reference

Antwane Lavertt "Juice" Wells Jr. (born April 2, 2001) is an American professional football wide receiver for the Atlanta Falcons of the National Football League (NFL). He played college football for the James Madison Dukes, South Carolina Gamecocks, and Ole Miss Rebels.

== Early life ==
Wells Jr. attended Highland Springs High School in Highland Springs, Virginia. As a senior, he had 36 catches for 880 yards and 12 touchdowns. He spent one year at Fork Union Military Academy, before committing to play college football at James Madison University.

== College career ==
As a freshman at James Madison in 2020, Wells Jr. played in all eight games with four starts and had a team leading 33 receptions for 603 yards with six touchdowns. As a sophomore in 2021, he started all 14 games and had 83 receptions for a school record 1,250 yards and 15 touchdowns.

Prior to the 2022 season, Wells Jr. transferred to the University of South Carolina. He became a starter his first year with the team.

On December 3, 2023, Wells announced that he would be entering the transfer portal for the second time.

On December 17, 2023, Wells announced that he would be transferring to the University of Mississippi to play for the Ole Miss Rebels.

== Professional career ==
Pre-draft measurables
| Height | Weight | Arm length | Hand span | Wingspan | 40-yard dash | 10-yard split | 20-yard split | Vertical jump | Broad jump |
|---|---|---|---|---|---|---|---|---|---|
| 6 ft 0 3/4 in (1.85 m) | 201 lb (91 kg) | 31 1/2 in (0.80 m) | 8 7/8 in (0.23 m) | 6 ft 5 1/8 in (1.96 m) | 4.58 s | 1.53 s | 2.68 s | 34.0 in (0.86 m) | 10 ft 4 in (3.15 m) |
All values from NFL Combine

=== New York Giants ===
On May 9, 2025, Wells signed with the New York Giants as an undrafted free agent after going unselected in the 2025 NFL draft. On August 26, he was waived as part of final roster cuts. On October 13, Wells was signed to the practice squad. He was released on October 28.

=== Columbus Aviators ===
On February 7, 2026, Wells signed with the Columbus Aviators of the United Football League (UFL).

=== Atlanta Falcons ===
On June 17, 2026, Wells signed with the Atlanta Falcons on the second day of their mini camp. On August 30, Wells was waived by the Falcons as a part of final roster cuts; he was re-signed to the team's practice squad the next day.
