= Caden Davis (placekicker) =

American football player (born 2001)

Profile
- Position: Placekicker

Personal information
- Born: February 27, 2001 (age 25); Coppell, Texas, U.S.
- Listed height: 6 ft 2 in (1.88 m)
- Listed weight: 208 lb (94 kg)

Career information
- High school: Coppell (TX)
- College: Texas A&M (2019–2022); Ole Miss (2023–2024)
- NFL draft: 2025: undrafted

Career history
- New York Jets (2025)*; Buffalo Bills (2025)*
- * Offseason or practice squad member only
- Stats at Pro Football Reference

Caden Matthew Davis (born February 27, 2001) is an American professional football placekicker. He played college football for the Ole Miss Rebels and Texas A&M Aggies.

== Early life ==
Davis is from Coppell, Texas. He attended Coppell High School where he played football as a placekicker and participated in track and field, competing in several relay events. As a junior, he was named his district's special teams MVP and an honorable mention all-state selection by the Associated Press (AP). He opened his senior season with a game-winning 57-yard field goal and later in the season made another game-winning field goal of over 50 yards. He ended his senior year having been successful on 11 of 15 field goal attempts, while in his high school career he finished 41 for 56 on field goals and 146 for 150 on extra point attempts. A three-star recruit, he committed to play college football for the Texas A&M Aggies.

== College career ==
=== Texas A&M ===
Davis redshirted as a true freshman at Texas A&M in 2019. He then served as the team's kickoff specialist during the 2020 season, appearing in all 10 games and averaging 64.3 yards per kickoff. He remained in that role in 2021, averaging 64.1 yards per kick, while also attempting one field goal and converting one extra point. He won the team's starting kicker job in 2022, replacing the graduating Seth Small. Prior to the season, he claimed to have been able to kick field goals of up to 76 yards in practice, albeit in windy conditions.

Davis began the 2022 season as starter, but later was demoted to being backup to Randy Bond. He made one field goal on three attempts and six extra point attempts on the season. After the season ended, Davis entered the NCAA transfer portal.

=== Ole Miss ===
Davis committed to the Ole Miss Rebels in December 2022. He won the starting job for the 2023 season and helped Ole Miss to their best record in school history, making 18 of 23 field goal attempts and all 51 of his extra point attempts. He was named a second-team All-Southeastern Conference (SEC) selection by College Football Network (CFN).

Davis returned for a final season in 2024. He was named a semifinalist for the Lou Groza Award for best kicker nationally and was invited to the 2025 Senior Bowl.

== Professional career ==
Pre-draft measurables
Height	Weight	Arm length	Hand span	Wingspan
6 ft 1 5/8 in (1.87 m)	208 lb (94 kg)	30 7/8 in (0.78 m)	9 1/2 in (0.24 m)	6 ft 4 7/8 in (1.95 m)
All values from Pro Day

=== New York Jets ===
Davis signed with the New York Jets as an undrafted free agent on May 9, 2025. He was waived by New York on July 29.

=== Buffalo Bills ===
On August 8, 2025, Davis signed with the Buffalo Bills. He was waived on August 20.
