= JJ Pegues =

American football player (born 2001)

No. 92 – Las Vegas Raiders
- Position: Defensive tackle
- Roster status: Active

Personal information
- Born: November 25, 2001 (age 24); Oxford, Mississippi, U.S.
- Listed height: 6 ft 2 in (1.88 m)
- Listed weight: 325 lb (147 kg)

Career information
- High school: Oxford
- College: Auburn (2020–2021); Ole Miss (2022–2024)
- NFL draft: 2025: 6th round, 180th overall pick

Career history
- Las Vegas Raiders (2025–present)

Career NFL statistics as of Week 7, 2026
- Total tackles: 15
- Forced fumbles: 1
- Fumble recoveries: 1
- Stats at Pro Football Reference

Jeremiah J'veon "JJ" Pegues (PA-gees; born November 25, 2001) is an American professional football defensive tackle for the Las Vegas Raiders of the National Football League (NFL). He played college football for the Auburn Tigers and Ole Miss Rebels. Pegues was selected by the Raiders in the sixth round of the 2025 NFL draft.

== Early life ==
Pegues was born in Oxford, Mississippi, and attended Oxford High School where he played football and basketball. Coming out of high school, he was rated as a four-star recruit and committed to play college football for the Auburn Tigers.

== College career ==
=== Auburn ===
As a freshman at Auburn University in 2020, Pegues played as a tight end and had seven receptions for 57 yards, while also rushing five times for 14 yards. He was converted to a defensive tackle prior to the 2021 season. In 2021, Pegues tallied 17 tackles with two being for a loss, in 13 games. After the season, he entered his name into the NCAA transfer portal.

=== Ole Miss ===
Pegues transferred to play at the University of Mississippi for the Ole Miss Rebels, his hometown team. In 2022, he tallied 26 tackles with five being for a loss, three sacks, two pass deflections, and a receiving touchdown. In 2023, Pegues played in all 13 games for the Rebels starting in 12, where he notched 42 tackles with eight being for a loss, three and a half sacks, and four pass deflections. Ahead of the 2024 season, he was named the recipient of the Chucky Mullins Award. In week 9 of the 2024 season, Pegues recorded three tackles for a loss, two sacks, and a rushing touchdown in a win over Oklahoma.

=== College statistics ===
Year	Team	Games		Tackles					Interceptions				Fumbles				Rushing				Receiving			
Year	Team	GP	GS	Solo	Ast	Cmb	TfL	Sck	Int	Yds	Avg	PD	FR	Yds	TD	FF	Att	Yds	Avg	TD	Rec	Yds	Avg	TD
2020	Auburn	11	1	—	—	—	—	—	—	—	—	—	—	—	—	—	5	14	2.8	0	7	57	8.1	0
2021	Auburn	13	1	11	5	16	2	0.0	—	—	—	—	—	—	—	—	—	—	—	—	—	—	—	—
2022	Ole Miss	12	0	15	11	26	5	3.0	—	—	—	2	—	—	—	—	1	4	4.0	0	1	1	1.0	1
2023	Ole Miss	13	12	18	24	42	8	3.5	—	—	—	4	—	—	—	—	4	13	3.3	0	—	—	—	—
2024	Ole Miss	12	10	18	23	41	14	3.5	—	—	—	1	1	0	—	—	20	62	3.1	7	—	—	—	—
Career		61	24	62	63	125	29	10.0	—	—	—	7	1	0	—	—	30	93	3.1	7	8	58	7.3	1

== Professional career ==
Pre-draft measurables
Height	Weight	Arm length	Hand span	Wingspan	40-yard dash	10-yard split	20-yard split	20-yard shuttle	Three-cone drill	Vertical jump	Bench press
6 ft 2 1/2 in (1.89 m)	309 lb (140 kg)	32 1/2 in (0.83 m)	9 3/8 in (0.24 m)	6 ft 7 1/4 in (2.01 m)	5.15 s	1.82 s	3.02 s	4.89 s	7.77 s	27.5 in (0.70 m)	23 reps
All values from NFL Combine/Pro Day

Pegues was selected by the Las Vegas Raiders with the 180th pick in the sixth round of the 2025 NFL draft. On May 8, 2025, Pegues signed a 4-year contract with the Raiders worth $4.47 million.

== NFL career statistics ==
=== Regular season ===
Year	Team	Games		Tackles					Interceptions						Fumbles				
Year	Team	GP	GS	Cmb	Solo	Ast	Sck	TFL	Int	Yds	Avg	Lng	TD	PD	FF	Fum	FR	Yds	TD
2025	LV	9	0	11	4	7	0.0	1	0	0	0.0	0	0	0	0	0	1	0	0
Career		9	0	11	4	7	0.0	1	0	0	0.0	0	0	0	0	0	1	0	0
