= Princely Umanmielen =

American football player (born 2002)

No. 3 – Carolina Panthers
- Position: Outside linebacker
- Roster status: Active

Personal information
- Born: April 18, 2002 (age 24); Lagos, Nigeria
- Listed height: 6 ft 4 in (1.93 m)
- Listed weight: 255 lb (116 kg)

Career information
- High school: Manor (Manor, Texas, U.S.)
- College: Florida (2020–2023); Ole Miss (2024)
- NFL draft: 2025: 3rd round, 77th overall pick

Career history
- Carolina Panthers (2025–present)

Awards and highlights
- First-team All-SEC (2024); Second-team All-SEC (2023)

Career NFL statistics as of 2025
- Total tackles: 24
- Sacks: 1.5
- Forced fumbles: 1
- Fumble recoveries: 1
- Stats at Pro Football Reference

Princely Umanmielen (OO-man ME-el-EN; born April 18, 2002) is a Nigerian American professional football outside linebacker for the Carolina Panthers of the National Football League (NFL). He played college football for the Florida Gators and the Ole Miss Rebels. Umanmielen was selected by the Panthers in the third round of the 2025 NFL draft.

== Early life ==
Umanmielen attended Manor High School in Manor, Texas, recording 93 tackles with 13 going for a loss, six sacks, two fumble recoveries, and a forced fumble. Umanmielen committed to play college football at the University of Florida over offers from Auburn, Baylor, and Texas.

== College career ==
=== Florida ===
As a freshman in 2020, Umanmielen notched three tackles with two being for a loss, and two sacks. In 2021, he tallied 17 tackles with 1.5 going for a loss, a sack, and a forced fumble. In week 10 of the 2022 season, Umanmielen had a strip sack on quarterback Haynes King in a win over Texas A&M. He finished the 2022 season with 39 tackles with 9.5 being for a loss, 4.5 sacks, and two forced fumbles. Ahead of the 2023 season, Umanmielen was named preseason third-team all-SEC. He was a projected as a late second round pick for the 2024 NFL draft. On December 6, 2023, instead of declaring for the draft, he entered the NCAA transfer portal.

=== Ole Miss ===
On December 15, 2023, Umanmielen announced that he would be transferring to Ole Miss.

== Professional career ==
On January 7, 2025, Princely declared for the 2025 NFL draft.

Pre-draft measurables
Height	Weight	Arm length	Hand span	Wingspan	40-yard dash	10-yard split	20-yard split	20-yard shuttle	Three-cone drill	Vertical jump	Broad jump
6 ft 4 3/8 in (1.94 m)	244 lb (111 kg)	33 7/8 in (0.86 m)	9 5/8 in (0.24 m)	6 ft 10 1/8 in (2.09 m)	4.72 s	1.62 s	2.73 s	4.46 s	7.15 s	38.0 in (0.97 m)	10 ft 6 in (3.20 m)
All values from NFL Combine/Pro Day

Umanmielen was selected by the Carolina Panthers with the 77th pick in the third round of the 2025 NFL draft.

== Personal life ==
Umanmielen is a Christian. He was baptized in April 2026.

Umanmielen's younger brother, Princewill, is a college outside linebacker for the LSU Tigers.

He is of Nigerian descent.
