= 2026 South Carolina Gamecocks football team =

American college football season

2026 South Carolina Gamecocks football
- Conference: Southeastern Conference

Ranking
- CFP: No. 21
- Record: 6–5 (4–5 SEC)
- Head coach: Shane Beamer (6th season)
- Offensive coordinator: Kendal Briles (1st season)
- Offensive scheme: Bear raid
- Defensive coordinator: Clayton White (6th season)
- Base defense: 4–2–5
- Home stadium: Williams–Brice Stadium

Uniform
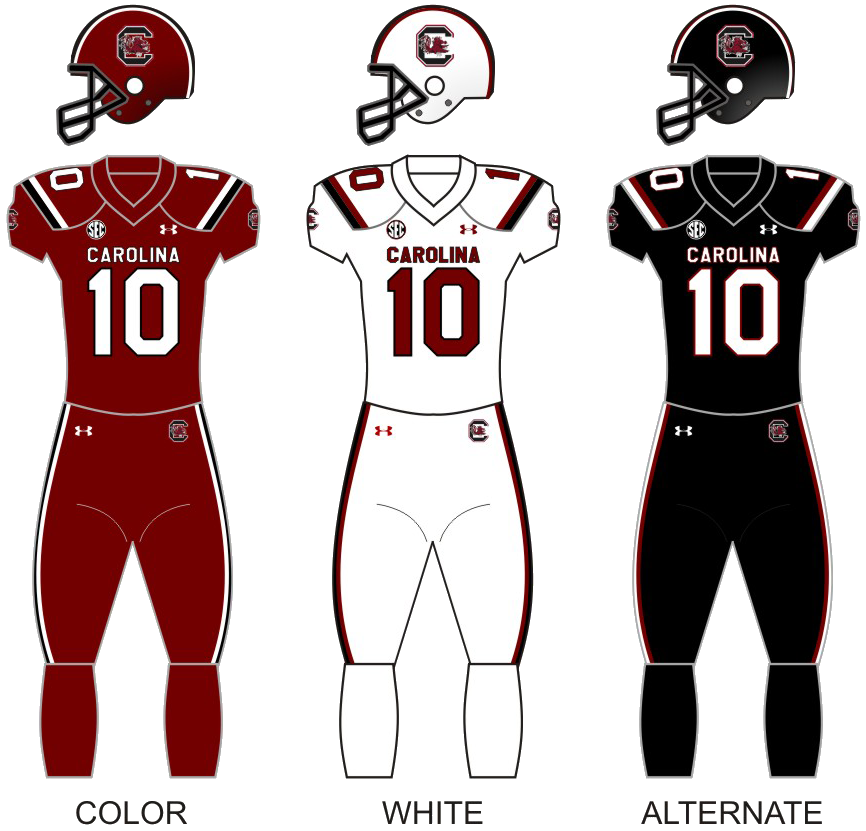

2026 Southeastern Conference football standings
	Conf.			Overall
Team	W		L	W		L
No. 1 Georgia y	8	–	1	10	–	1
No. 5 Texas	6	–	2	9	–	2
No. 9 Tennessee	6	–	2	9	–	2
No. 3 Alabama	6	–	2	9	–	2
No. 22 Oklahoma	5	–	3	7	–	4
No. 24 Florida	5	–	4	7	–	4
No. 16 Kentucky	5	–	4	7	–	4
No. 25 Ole Miss	4	–	4	7	–	4
Auburn	4	–	4	7	–	4
Missouri	4	–	4	7	–	4
No. 21 South Carolina	4	–	5	6	–	5
LSU	3	–	5	6	–	5
Mississippi State	2	–	6	5	–	6
Arkansas	2	–	6	4	–	7
Texas A&M	1	–	7	4	–	7
Vanderbilt	1	–	7	4	–	7
Championship: Georgia vs TBD
^ – College Football Playoff participant; $ – Conference champion; y – Championship game participant; As of November 22, 2026; Rankings from CFP rankings

The 2026 South Carolina Gamecocks football team represents the University of South Carolina as a member of the Southeastern Conference (SEC) during the 2026 NCAA Division I FBS football season. The Gamecocks play their home games at Williams–Brice Stadium located in Columbia, South Carolina, and are led by Shane Beamer in his sixth year as their head coach.

Despite a confounding 0-3 start to conference play and speculation about Beamer's job security, South Carolina mounted an enormous mid-season turnaround, spearheaded by back to back victories over top 15 ranked teams, #16 Florida and #11 Tennessee. In beating Florida on the road, Shane Beamer became the only coach in program history besides Steve Spurrier to beat the Gators in the Swamp. Carolina's upset win at home against #11 Tennessee resulted in a field storming at Williams–Brice Stadium, the third of Beamer's tenure. The following week, the Gamecocks traveled to Norman, Oklahoma, and trounced the Oklahoma Sooners, featuring one of the country's toughest defenses, by a score of 42-25. South Carolina extended their conference winning streak to four straight after beating the Texas A&M Aggies at home in a gritty, low-scoring game, solidifying their status of the hottest teams in the country, and star quarterback LaNorris Sellers' penchant for theatrical heroics.

On November 21, the Gamecocks played rival Georgia for the first time since the 2023 season. The Bulldogs came into the game ranked No. 1 in the country.

== Offseason ==
Positions key
Offense	Defense	Special teams
QB — Quarterback; RB — Running back; FB — Fullback; WR — Wide receiver; TE — Tight end; OL — Offensive lineman; T — Tackle; G — Guard; C — Center	DL — Defensive lineman; DT — Defensive tackle (Note: Includes nose tackle (NT)); DE — Defensive end; EDGE — Edge rusher; LB — Linebacker (Note: Includes middle linebacker (MLB/MIKE), weakside linebacker (WILL), strongside linebacker (SAM), off-ball linebacker, and outside linebacker (OLB)); DB — Defensive back; CB — Cornerback; S — Safety (Note: Includes free safety (FS) and strong safety (SS))	K — Kicker (Note: Also known as a placekicker (PK)); P — Punter; LS — Long snapper; RS — Return specialist (Note: Includes kickoff and punt returners)

=== Departures ===
==== Team departures ====
2026 South Carolina offseason departures
Name	Pos.	Height	Weight	Year	Hometown	Notes
Brandon Cisse	CB	6'0	190	Junior	Sumter, SC	Declared by 2026 NFL Draft
Nick Barrett	DT	6'3	322	Redshirt Senior	Goldsboro, NC	Graduated/Declared by 2026 NFL Draft
Jalon Kilgore	S	6'1	211	Junior	Eatonton, GA	Declared by 2026 NFL Draft
DQ Smith	DB	6'1	219	Senior	Columbia, SC	Graduated
Buddy Mack III	DB	6'0	214	Graduated Student	Greer, SC	Graduated
Monkell Goodwine	DL	6'4	305	Redshirt Senior	Upper Marlboro, MD	Graduated
Demon Clowney	EDGE	6'4	255	Graduated Student	Baltimore, MD	Graduated
Jatius Geer	EDGE	6'6	250	Redshirt Senior	Anderson, SC	Graduated
Bryan Thomas Jr.	EDGE	6'2	249	Senior	Windermere, FL	Graduated
Andrew Colasurdo	LB	6'1	235	Redshirt Senior	Inman, SC	Graduated
Colin Bryant	LB	6'2	230	Redshirt Senior	Mount Pleasant, SC	Graduated
Cole Rasmussen	LS	5'10	220	Graduated Student	Fort Mill, SC	Graduated
Rodney Newsom Jr.	OL	6'3	310	Sixth Year	Memphis, TN	Graduated
Chase Sweigart	OL	6'6	304	Redshirt Junior	Chapin, SC	Graduated
William Joyce	PK/P	6'3	219	Redshirt Senior	Spartanburg, SC	Graduated
Rahsul Faison	RB	6'0	218	Graduated Student	Pottstown, PA	Graduated
Nathan Harris-Waynick	RB	5'10	205	Redshirt Senior	Sumter, SC	Graduated
Oscar Adaway III	RB	5'11	219	Graduated Student	North Little Rock, AR	Graduated
Bradley Dunn	RB	5'9	206	Graduated Student	Columbia, SC	Graduated
Chase McCracken	RB	5'11	208	Redshirt Junior	Hilton Head, SC	Graduated
Larry Scott	RB	5'11	219	Redshirt Senior	Port Wentworth, GA	Graduated
Jordan Dingle	TE	6'4	242	Redshirt Senior	Bowling Green, KY	Graduated
Lukas Vozeh	TE	6'3	246	Redshirt Sophomore	Franklin Lakes, NJ	Graduated
Eriq Rice	WR	6'2	201	Redshirt Senior	Columbia, SC	Graduated
Jared Brown	WR	6'0	195	Redshirt Senior	Lilburn, GA	Graduated
Davonte Miles	DT	6'4	280	Redshirt Junior	River Rouge, MI	No longer on team

==== Outgoing transfers ====
Name	No.	Pos.	Height	Weight	Hometown	Year	New school	Source
Michael Smith	--	TE	6'4"	245	Savannah, GA	Sophomore	Ole Miss	
Nick Sharpe	52	IOL	6'2"	297	Gastonia, NC	Redshirt Senior	Michigan State	
Zavion Hardy	94	DL	6'5"	260	Macon, GA	Junior	Baylor	
Emazon Littlejohn	83	WR	6'0"	188	Gaffney, SC	Redshirt Freshman	Western Michigan	
Jaron Willis	14	LB	6'2"	225	Leesburg, GA	Redshirt Junior	Kansas	
Peyton Argent	48	K	6'0"	217	Hoover, AL	Redshirt Sophomore	South Alabama	
Mac Walters	66	IOL	6'6"	290	Myrtle Beach, SC	Redshirt Junior	Appalachian State	
Trovon Baugh	78	IOL	6'4"	337	Atlanta, GA	Junior	Texas A&M	
Brian Rowe Jr.	18	WR	5'11"	155	Concord, NC	Freshman	UCLA	
Cason Henry	75	OT	6'6"	300	Marietta, GA	Redshirt Junior	Louisville	
Air Noland	11	QB	6'2"	195	Fairburn, GA	Redshirt Freshman	Memphis	
Tree Babalade	51	OT	6'5"	338	Hyattsville, MD	Redshirt Sophomore	Nebraska	
Chase Kibble	59	DT	6'5"	285	Leesburg, VA	Redshirt Freshman	TBA	
Myles Norwood	3	CB	6'2"	170	St. Louis, MO	Redshirt Senior	Louisville	
Rodney Newsom	65	IOL	6'3"	290	Memphis, TN	Redshirt Senior	TBA	
Boaz Stanley	50	IOL	6'5"	265	Bogart, GA	Senior	Purdue	
Vandrevius Jacobs	4	WR	6'0"	171	Fort Pierce, FL	Redshirt Sophomore	Miami (FL)	
Taeshawn Alston	29	EDGE	6'4"	204	Henderson, NC	Freshman	North Carolina Central	
Campbell Vandiver	68	OT	6'8"	312	Brentwood, TN	Redshirt Sophomore	Montana	
Jaylen Brown	91	EDGE	6'6"	255	Madison, AL	Sophomore	LSU	
Jatavius Shivers	77	OT	6'6"	315	Villa Rica, GA	Redshirt Sophomore	Purdue	
Ryan Brubaker	73	OT	6'6"	304	Denver, PA	Redshirt Junior	Virginia	
Desmond Umeozulu	9	EDGE	6'6"	246	Upper Marlboro, MD	Junior	Alabama	

==== Coaching staff departures ====
Name	Position	New Team	New Position
Mike Shula	Offensive coordinator/quarterbacks coach	Accepted job at Minnesota	Senior offensive assistant
Joe DeCamillis	Associate head coach/special teams coordinator	Accepted job for the Las Vegas Raiders	Special teams coordinator
Marquel Blackwell	Running backs coach	Accepted job at UConn	Co-offensive coordinator/quarterbacks coach
Lonnie Teasley	Offensive line coach	Accepted job at Nebraska	Run game coordinator
Sterling Lucas	Defensive run game coordinator/defensive ends coach/outside linebackers coach	Accepted job at LSU	Defensive line coach

=== Entered NFL draft ===
The deadline for players to declare for the NFL draft was January 14, 2026.

Three South Carolina players were drafted in 2026.

During the second round of the draft that April, cornerback Brandon Cisse was the 52nd pick overall, selected by the Green Bay Packers; in the fifth round, defensive tackle Nick Barrett (#145) was selected by the Los Angeles Chargers; safety Jalon Kilgore (#167) was selected by the Buffalo Bills.

Player	Position	Round	Pick	Drafted by
Brandon Cisse	CB	2	52	Green Bay Packers
Nick Barrett	DT	5	145	Los Angeles Chargers
Jalon Kilgore	S	5	167	Buffalo Bills

=== Incoming transfers ===
Name	Pos.	Height	Weight	Hometown	Year	Prev school	Source
Jayden Gibson	WR	6'5"	190	Winter Garden, FL	Redshirt Junior	Oklahoma	
Jordan Thomas	DL	6'5"	320	Ramsey, NJ	Redshirt Freshman	Georgia	
Carter Miller	IOL	6'4"	280	Brentwood, TN	Senior	UCF	
Hank Purvis	IOL	6'5"	315	Wichita, KS	Sophomore	Purdue	
Upton Bellenfant	K	6'2"	180	Murfreesboro, TN	Redshirt Junior	Texas Tech	
Quaysheed Scott	CB	6'0"	185	Marion, SC	Sophomore	Kentucky	
Jacarrius Peak	OT	6'5"	310	Valdosta, GA	Redshirt Junior	NC State	
Emmanuel Poku	OT	6'6"	326	Charlotte, NC	Redshirt Junior	East Carolina	
Sam Williams-Dixon	RB	5'11"	195	Millersburg, OH	Sophomore	Ohio State	
Nitro Tuggle	WR	6'0.5"	185	South Bend, IN	Sophomore	Purdue	
Dayne Arnett	IOL	6'5"	305	Grand Haven, MI	Senior	Ferris State	
Tomiwa Durojaiye	DL	6'4"	254	Middletown, DE	Redshirt Junior	Illinois	
Emmet Rhoades	LS	5'10"	225	Saint Ignatius, MT	Junior	Western Carolina	
Seth Smith	OT	6'6"	285	Chandler, AZ	Senior	Northern Arizona	
Kelby Collins	DL	6'5"	275	Gardendale, AL	Junior	Alabama	
Drew Collins	EDGE	6'4"	238	Gardendale, AL	Redshirt Freshman	Arkansas State	
Jabree Wallace-Coleman	RB	6'0"	210	Naples, FL	Freshman	Penn State	
Caleb Herring	EDGE	6'5"	249	Newnan, GA	Junior	Tennessee	
Christian Clark	RB	5'11"	195	Phoenix, AZ	Redshirt Freshman	Texas	
Lucian Anderson III	QB	6'3"	190	Athens, GA	Junior	Bowling Green	
Charly Mullaly	WR	5'10"	195	East Fishkill, NY	Junior	Holy Cross	
Armando Nieves	OT	6'7"	310	Phoenix, AZ	Sophomore	New Mexico State	
Max Drag	TE	6'4"	230	Chapin, SC	Redshirt Sophomore	UCF	
DJ Black	WR	6'4"	190	Inman, SC	Senior	UCF	
Ebubedike Nnabugwu	IOL	6'0"	300	Baltimore, MD	Junior	Missouri State	
Malik Orsan	K	6'0"	215	St. Louis, MO	Freshman	Southeast Missouri State	
Vincent Chen	OT	6'8"	328	DeLand, FL	Sophomore	Stetson	

== Schedule ==
Date	Time	Opponent	Rank	Site	TV	Result	Attendance
September 5	12:45 p.m.	Kent State*		Williams–Brice Stadium; Columbia, SC	SECN	W 57–0	77,559
September 12	7:00 p.m.	Towson*		Williams–Brice Stadium; Columbia, SC	SECN+	W 45–9	78,399
September 19	4:15 p.m.	Mississippi State		Williams–Brice Stadium; Columbia, SC	SECN	L 34–41	78,360
September 26	7:00 p.m.	at No. 8 Alabama		Bryant–Denny Stadium; Tuscaloosa, AL	ESPN	L 18–49	100,077
October 3	4:15 p.m.	No. 24 Kentucky		Williams–Brice Stadium; Columbia, SC	SECN	L 34–35 ^{OT}	77,808
October 10	12:45 p.m.	at No. 16 Florida		Ben Hill Griffin Stadium; Gainesville, FL	SECN	W 38–19	90,311
October 24	3:30 p.m.	No. 11 Tennessee		Williams–Brice Stadium; Columbia, SC	ESPN	W 27–24	79,193
October 31	4:15 p.m.	at Oklahoma		Gaylord Family Oklahoma Memorial Stadium; Norman, OK	SECN	W 42–25	83,189
November 7	3:00 p.m.	Texas A&M	No. 21	Williams–Brice Stadium; Columbia, SC	ESPN	W 17–9	78,687
November 14	7:45 p.m.	at Arkansas	No. 17	Donald W. Reynolds Razorback Stadium; Fayetteville, AR	SECN	L 6–34	63,334
November 21	7:30 p.m.	No. 1 Georgia	No. 21	Williams–Brice Stadium; Columbia, SC (rivalry)	ABC	L 6–34	79,105
November 28	3:00 p.m.	at Clemson*		Memorial Stadium; Clemson, SC (Palmetto Bowl)	ESPN2		
*Non-conference game; Rankings from AP Poll (and CFP Rankings, after November 3) - Released prior to game; All times are in Eastern time

== Rankings ==
Ranking movements Legend: ██ Increase in ranking ██ Decrease in ranking — = Not ranked RV = Received votes
	Week															
Poll	Pre	1	2	3	4	5	6	7	8	9	10	11	12	13	14	Final
AP	RV	RV	RV	—	—	—	—	—	RV	23	20	RV				
Coaches	RV	RV	RV	—	—	—	—	—	RV	RV	24	RV				
CFP	Not released									21	17	21				Not released

== Personnel ==
=== Coaching staff ===
Name	Position	Consecutive season
Shane Beamer	Head coach	6th
Kendal Briles	Offensive coordinator and quarterbacks coach	1st
Clayton White	Defensive coordinator and inside linebackers coach	6th
Matthew Smiley	Special teams coordinator	1st
Torrian Gray	Defensive backs coach	6th
Stan Drayton	Associate head coach/running backs coach	1st
Randy Clements	Offensive line coach	1st
Mike Furrey	Passing game coordinator/wide receivers coach	3rd
Shawn Elliot	Run game coordinator/tight ends coach	3rd
Travian Robertson	Defensive Lines coach	4th
Deion Barnes	Defensive ends/outside linebackers coach	1st
Trey Money	Linebackers coach	1st

=== Roster ===
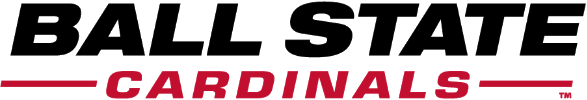
2026 South Carolina Gamecocks Football Roster
Quarterback: 11 Landon Duckworth – Freshman (6'4, 215); 12 Cutter Woods – (redshirt) Freshman (6'3, 215); 15 Lucian Anderson III – (redshirt) Junior (6'3, 216); 16 LaNorris Sellers – (redshirt) Junior (6'3, 238); 19 Brandon Cunningham – (redshirt) Freshman (6'1, 185); 25 Jimmy Francis – (redshirt) Sophomore (5'10, 190); Running back: 4 Isaiah Augustave – (redshirt) Junior (6'0, 215); 10 Christian Clark – (redshirt) Sophomore (5'11, 216); 21 Jabree Coleman – (redshirt) Freshman (6'1, 215); 22 Jawarn Howell – (redshirt) Junior (6'1, 222); 28 Matt Fuller – (redshirt) Sophomore (5'11, 221); 31 Neil Salvage III – (redshirt) Sophomore (5'9, 186); 35 Ethan Kellum – Freshman (5'10, 200); Wide receiver: 0 Lex Cyrus – (redshirt) Freshman (5'10, 185); 1 Nitro Tuggle – Junior (6'1, 195); 3 Mazeo Bennett Jr. – Junior (5'10, 185); 6 Donovan Murph – Sophomore (6'2, 199); 7 Jordon Gidron – (redshirt) Freshman (6'2, 197); 8 Nyck Harbor – Senior (6'5, 239); 9 Jayden Gibson – (redshirt) Senior (6'5, 205); 13 Malik Clark – (redshirt) Freshman (6'2, 195); 17 Jayden Sellers – Sophomore (5'11, 180); 18 Stone Furrey – Freshman (5'10, 181); 23 Sequel Pattrson – Freshman (5'11, 180); 82 Jackson Repp – (redshirt) Freshman (5'8, 175); 83 DJ Black – (redshirt) Senior (6'2, 205); 84 Charly Mullaly – (redshirt) Junior (6'0, 185); Placekicker/Punter: 14 Max Kelley – Sophomore (6'2, 225); 24 Mason Love – (redshirt) Sophomore (6'0, 195); 27 Upton Bellenfant – (redshirt) Senior (6'0, 180)	Tight end: 5 Mike Tyler – Sophomore (6'4, 245); 44 Maurice Brown II – Senior (6'4, 250); 80 Max Drag – (redshirt) Junior (6'4, 248); 81 Reno Roehm – (redshirt) Sophomore (6'7, 260); 85 Caden Ramsey – Freshman (6'5, 220); 87 Brady Hunt – Graduate Student (6'5, 251) ; Offensive Lineman: 50 Carter Miller – (redshirt) Senior (6'2, 311); 51 Ebubedike Nnabugwu (redshirt) Junior (6'2, 310); 52 Hank Purvis – Junior (6'5, 330); 54 Ashton Mozone – Junior (6'4, 310); 55 Damola Ajidahun – (redshirt) Freshman (6'6, 315); 58 Markee Anderson – (redshirt) Junior (6'2, 320); 60 Anthony Baxter – Freshman (6'4, 340); 62 Nolan Hay – (redshirt) Senior (6'3, 328); 63 Parker Lawson – (redshirt) Junior (6'4, 308); 64 Neff Giwa – Freshman (6'7, 305); 65 Jacarrius Peak – (redshirt) Senior (6'4, 305); 67 Vincent Chen – Junior (6'7, 330); 69 Emmanuel Kojo Poku – (redshirt) Senior (6'5, 320); 70 Jake Recker – (redshirt) Sophomore (6'5, 310); 71 Blake Franks – (redshirt) Sophomore (6'5, 325); 72 Shedrick Sarratt Jr. – Sophomore (6'4, 318); 74 Josiah Thompson – Junior (6'7, 305); 75 Dayne Arnett – (redshirt) Senior (6'5, 300); 76 Zyon Guiles – Freshman (6'5, 305); 77 Darius Gray – Freshman (6'3, 302); 78 Seth Smith – (redshirt) Senior (6'4, 309); 79 Armando Nieves – (redshirt) Senior (6'6, 315); Defensive Lineman: 11 Jordan Thomas – (redshirt) Sophomore (6'5, 316); 13 Tomiwa Durojaiye – (redshirt) Senior (6'4, 291); 65 Noah Clark – Freshman (6'5, 345); 88 Caleb Williams – (redshirt) Freshman (6'5, 287); 92 Aiden Harris – Freshman (6'2, 286); 95 Christian Ingram – (redshirt) Freshman (6'6, 300); 97 Kelby Collins – Senior (6'4, 285); 99 Gabe Brownlow-Dindy – (redshirt) Senior (6'3, 310); Defensive Tackle: 33 Troy Pikes – (redshirt) Junior (6'3, 293); EDGE: 22 Jaquavious Dodd – (redshirt) Freshman (6'6, 253); EDGE rusher: 6 Dylan Stewart – Junior (6'5, 250); 10 George Wilson Jr. – Graduate Student (6'5, 240); 27 Drew Collins – (redshirt) Sophomore (6'2, 246); 39 Caleb Herring – Senior (6'5, 245); 40 Anthony Addison – (redshirt) Freshman (6'4, 230); 41 Kobby Sakyi-Prah – (redshirt) Freshman (6'2, 231); 93 Julian Walker – Freshman (6'6, 255)	Linebacker: 0 Fred "JayR" Johnson – Junior (6'3, 241); 7 Shawn Murphy – (redshirt) Senior (6'3, 233); 15 Donovan Darden – Sophomore (6'4, 240); 17 Justin Okoronkwo – Junior (6'3, 230); 20 Josh Smith – (redshirt) Freshman (6'2, 234); 24 Keenan Britt - Freshman (6'0, 238); 30 Andrew Harris – Freshman (6'2, 238); 32 AJ Holloway – (redshirt) Freshman (6'2, 232); 34 Jamian Risher Jr. – (redshirt) Senior (6'1, 238); Defensive back: 1 Gerald Kilgore – (redshirt) Senior (6'0, 208); 3 Kelvin Hunter – (redshirt) Sophomore (6'0, 210); 4 Vicari Swain – (redshirt) Junior (6'0, 193); 5 Kendall Daniels Jr. – Sophomore (6'4, 213); 8 Judge Collier – Senior (6'2, 206); 9 David Bucey – Junior (6'0, 214); 12 Quay'sheed Scott – Junior (5'11, 208); 14 J'Zavien Currence – Freshman (6'4, 215); 16 Jalewis Solomon – (redshirt) Sophomore (6'1, 195); 18 Jaquel Holman – Sophomore (6'1, 214); 19 Damarcus Leach – Sophomore (6'3, 201); 21 Chris Hatfield – (redshirt) Freshman (6'2, 215); 23 Triston Lewis – Freshman (6'2, 210); 25 Zahbari Sandy – (redshirt) Junior (6'2, 208); 26 Isaiah McClary – (redshirt) Sophomore (6'1, 175); 28 Kosci Barnes – Freshman (6'2, 209); 29 Cedric Cisse – (redshirt) Freshman (6'0, 193); 31 Peyton Williams – (redshirt) Senior (6'0, 214); 35 Jackson Burger – (redshirt) Sophomore (6'1, 209); 36 Landon Kurtz – (redshirt) Sophomore (6'2, 200); 43 Tony Brown – (redshirt) Freshman (6'1, 195); 44 KJ Johnson – Freshman (6'1, 175); Long snappers: 29 Gunnar Yocum – (redshirt) Sophomore (6'0, 201); 32 Malik Orsan – (redshirt) Freshman (6'1, 210); 33 Kyler Farrow – (redshirt) Freshman (6'2, 221); 45 Matthew Oh – Freshman (5'9, 215); 48 Emmet Rhoades – (redshirt) Junior (5'11, 225)
: 2026 South Carolina Gamecocks Football Roster 06/18/26

== Game summaries ==
=== vs Kent State ===
Kent State Golden Flashes (0–0) at South Carolina Gamecocks (0–0) – Game summary

Quarter	1	2	3	4	Total
Golden Flashes	0	0	0	0	0
Gamecocks	7	22	14	14	57

at Williams–Brice Stadium • Columbia, South Carolina

- Date: September 5
- Game time: 12:45 p.m.
- Game weather: Sunny, 95 °F (35 °C)
- Game attendance: 77,559
- Referee: Steve Marlowe
- TV announcers (SECN): Taylor Zarzour, Matt Stinchcomb and Michella Chester

Game information

First quarter

- SC – Matt Fuller 7-yard run (Max Kelley kick), 4:18. Gamecocks 7–0. Drive: 7 plays, 87 yards, 2:42.

Second quarter

- SC – Mazeo Bennett Jr. 18-yard pass from LaNorris Sellers (Maurice Brown II pass to Brady Hunt), 12:41. Gamecocks 15–0. Drive: 8 plays, 85 yards, 3:01.
- SC – Jabree Coleman 60-yard run (Max Kelley kick), 6:25. Gamecocks 22–0. Drive: 6 plays, 92 yards, 1:56.
- SC – Donovan Murph 29-yard pass from LaNorris Sellers (Max Kelley kick), 1:10. Gamecocks 29–0. Drive: 7 plays, 87 yards, 2:19.

Third quarter

- SC – Donovan Murph 37-yard pass from LaNorris Sellers (Malik Orsan kick), 13:21. Gamecocks 36–0. Drive: 6 plays, 75 yards, 1:39.
- SC – Mike Tyler 7-yard pass from Cutter Woods (Malik Orsan kick), 6:20. Gamecocks 43–0. Drive: 11 plays, 72 yards, 4:20.

Fourth quarter

- SC – Isaiah Augustave 1-yard run (Malik Orsan kick), 9:12. Gamecocks 50–0. Drive: 11 plays, 86 yards, 10:11.
- SC – Jabree Coleman 5-yard run (Malik Orsan kick), 2:26. Gamecocks 57–0. Drive: 8 plays, 61 yards, 5:19.

Statistics	KENT	SC
First downs	10	35
Plays–yards	48–179	72–645
Rushes–yards	25–100	39–278
Passing yards	79	367
Passing: comp–att–int	14–23–1	27–33–0
Turnovers	1	0
Time of possession	25:13	34:47

Team	Category	Player	Statistics
Kent State	Passing	Dru DeShields	12/20, 63 yards
Kent State	Rushing	Dru DeShields	3 carries, 27 yards
Kent State	Receiving	Mason King	2 receptions, 21 yards
South Carolina	Passing	LaNorris Sellers	19/23, 270 yards, 3 TD
South Carolina	Rushing	Jabree Coleman	4 carries, 77 yards, 2 TD
South Carolina	Receiving	Donovan Murph	4 receptions, 92 yards, 2 TD

=== vs Towson (FCS) ===
Towson Tigers (FCS) (0–2) at South Carolina Gamecocks (1–0) – Game summary

Quarter	1	2	3	4	Total
Tigers (FCS)	0	3	6	0	9
Gamecocks	7	10	14	14	45

at Williams–Brice Stadium • Columbia, South Carolina

- Date: September 12
- Game time: 7:00 p.m.
- Game weather: Sunny • Temperature: 87 °F (31 °C) • Wind: SW at 5 miles per hour (8.0 km/h)
- Game attendance: 78,399
- Referee: Kyle Olson
- TV announcers (SECN+): Richard Cross and Charlie Strong

Game information

First quarter

- SC – Vicari Swain 58-yard punt return (Max Kelley kick), 9:37. Gamecocks 7–0.

Second quarter

- SC – Max Kelley 33-yard field goal, 12:44. Gamecocks 10–0. Drive: 11 plays, 66 yards, 5:27.
- SC – Matt Fuller 55-yard run (Max Kelley kick), 3:44. Gamecocks 17–0. Drive: 5 plays, 56 yards, 2:50.
- TOW – Zaydaan Faridi 41-yard field goal, 1:04. Gamecocks 17–3. Drive: 8 plays, 52 yards, 2:40.

Third quarter

- SC – LaNorris Sellers 58-yard run (Max Kelley kick), 12:07. Gamecocks 24–3. Drive: 3 plays, 67 yards, 1:06.
- TOW – Aaron Enterline 23-yard pass from Andrew Indorf (Zaydaan Faridi kick BLOCKED), 7:03. Gamecocks 24–9. Drive: 11 plays, 75 yards, 5:04.
- SC – Vicari Swain 45-yard punt return (Malik Orsan kick), 0:03. Gamecocks 31–9.

Fourth quarter

- SC – Jabree Coleman 3-yard run (Malik Orsan kick), 8:29. Gamecocks 38–9. Drive: 3 plays, 27 yards, 1:12.
- SC – Isaiah Augustave 55-yard run (Malik Orsan kick), 6:32. Gamecocks 45–9. Drive: 2 plays, 55 yards, 0:22.

Statistics	TOW	SC
First downs	12	22
Plays–yards	63–203	67–502
Rushes–yards	29–21	41–405
Passing yards	182	97
Passing: comp–att–int	18–34–0	11–26–1
Turnovers	0	2
Time of possession	33:52	26:08

Team	Category	Player	Statistics
Towson	Passing	Andrew Indorf	16/30, 171 yards, TD
Towson	Rushing	Kahseim Phillips	4 carries, 15 yards
Towson	Receiving	Aaron Enterline	10 receptions, 123 yards, TD
South Carolina	Passing	LaNorris Sellers	10/23, 96 yards, INT
South Carolina	Rushing	Matt Fuller	11 carries, 125 yards, TD
South Carolina	Receiving	Nyck Harbor	2 receptions, 35 yards

=== vs Mississippi State ===
Mississippi State Bulldogs (2–0) at South Carolina Gamecocks (2–0) – Game summary

Quarter	1	2	3	4	Total
Bulldogs	0	14	17	10	41
Gamecocks	13	10	0	11	34

at Williams–Brice Stadium • Columbia, South Carolina

- Date: September 19
- Game time: 5:35 p.m.
- Game weather: Cloudy • Temperature: 89 °F (32 °C) • Wind: NE 6 mph (9.7 km/h)
- Game attendance: 78,360
- Referee: Jeff Heaser
- TV announcers (SECN): Matt Schumacker, Aaron Murray and Taylor Davis
- Report: Official report

Statistics	MSST	SC
First downs	19	21
Plays–yards	61–393	79–431
Rushes–yards	34–135	39–149
Passing yards	258	282
Passing: comp–att–int	19–27–1	25–40–2
Time of possession	25:45	34:15

Team	Category	Player	Statistics
Mississippi State	Passing	Kamario Taylor	18/26, 251 yards, 4 TD, INT
Mississippi State	Rushing	Fluff Bothwell	21 carries, 116 yards
Mississippi State	Receiving	Zion Ragins	2 receptions, 61 yards, TD
South Carolina	Passing	LaNorris Sellers	25/40, 282 yards, 2 TD, 2 INT
South Carolina	Rushing	Matt Fuller	17 carries, 73 yards, TD
South Carolina	Receiving	Matt Fuller	7 receptions, 85 yards, TD

=== at No. 8 Alabama ===
South Carolina Gamecocks (2–1) at No. 8 Alabama Crimson Tide (3–0) – Game summary

Quarter	1	2	3	4	Total
Gamecocks	0	10	0	8	18
No. 8 Crimson Tide	14	21	0	14	49

at Bryant–Denny Stadium • Tuscaloosa, Alabama

- Date: September 26
- Game time: 7:00 p.m.
- Game weather: Sunny • Temperature: 82 °F (28 °C) • Wind: S at 6 miles per hour (9.7 km/h)
- Game attendance: 100,077
- Referee: Daniel Gautreaux
- TV announcers (ESPN): Dave Pasch, Dusty Dvoracek, and Taylor McGregor

Statistics	SC	ALA
First downs	22	20
Plays–yards	73–419	57–489
Rushes–yards	40–216	30–124
Passing yards	203	365
Passing: comp–att–int	20–33–1	21–27–0
Turnovers	2	0
Time of possession	29:40	30:20

Team	Category	Player	Statistics
South Carolina	Passing	LaNorris Sellers	18/30, 185 yards, TD, INT
South Carolina	Rushing	Matt Fuller	19 carries, 112 yards, TD
South Carolina	Receiving	Nyck Harbor	3 receptions, 42 yards, TD
Alabama	Passing	Keelon Russell	21/27, 365 yards, 4 TD
Alabama	Rushing	EJ Crowell	6 carries, 50 yards
Alabama	Receiving	Ryan Coleman-Williams	5 receptions, 98 yards, 2 TD

=== vs No. 24 Kentucky ===
No. 24 Kentucky Wildcats (3–1) at South Carolina Gamecocks (2–2) – Game summary

Quarter	1	2	3	4	OT	Total
No. 24 Wildcats	0	10	14	3	8	35
Gamecocks	14	6	0	7	7	34

at Williams–Brice Stadium • Columbia, South Carolina

- Date: October 3
- Game time: 4:15 p.m.
- Game weather: Cloudy • Temperature: 79 °F (26 °C)
- Game attendance: 77,808
- Referee: David Smith
- TV announcers (SECN): Taylor Zarzour, Matt Stinchcomb, and Michella Chester

Game information

First quarter

- (11:00) SC - Matt Fuller 6-yard run (Malik Orsan kick) (Drive: 10 plays, 75 yards, 4:00)
- (2:09) SC - Jabree Coleman 4-yard run (Malik Orsan kick) (Drive: 5 plays, 66 yards, 1:59)

Second quarter

- (11:02) SC - Malik Orsan 29-yard field goal (Drive: 11 plays, 47 yards, 4:39)
- (2:47) UK - CJ Baxter 3-yard run (Adam Zouagui kick) (Drive: 5 plays, 33 yards, 2:17)
- (0:59) UK - Adam Zouagui 42-yard field goal (Drive: 7 plays, 50 yards, 1:19)
- (0:00) SC - Malik Orsan 48-yard field goal (Drive: 6 plays, 45 yards, 0:59)

Third quarter

- (11:59) UK - Kenny Darby 17-yard pass from Kenny Minchey (Adam Zouagui kick) (Drive: 7 plays, 75 yards, 2:59)
- (0:40) UK - Nic Anderson 32-yard pass from Kenny Minchey (Adam Zouagui kick) (Drive: 5 plays, 51 yards, 2:34)

Fourth quarter

- (13:14) SC - DJ Black 15-yard pass from LaNorris Sellers (Malik Orsan kick) (Drive: 5 plays, 75 yards, 2:26)
- (4:13) UK - Adam Zouagui 29-yard field goal (Drive: 10 plays, 66 yard, 5:23)

Overtime

- SC - Maurice Brown II 5-yard pass from LaNorris Sellers (Malik Orsan kick) (Drive: 6 plays, 25 yards)
- UK - Henry Boyer 6-yard pass from Kenny Minchey (Kenny Minchey pass to Willie Rodriguez for Two-Point Conversion) (Drive: 4 plays, 25 yards)

Statistics	UK	SC
First downs	25	21
Plays–yards	78–394	74–458
Rushes–yards	37–122	37–232
Passing yards	272	226
Passing: comp–att–int	28–41–0	20–37–0
Time of possession	33:29	26:31

Team	Category	Player	Statistics
Kentucky	Passing	Kenny Minchey	28/41, 272 yards, 3 TD
Kentucky	Rushing	CJ Baxter	13 carries, 48 yards, TD
Kentucky	Receiving	Kenny Darby	12 receptions, 96 yards, TD
South Carolina	Passing	LaNorris Sellers	20/36, 226 yards, 2 TD
South Carolina	Rushing	LaNorris Sellers	17 carries, 147 yards
South Carolina	Receiving	Mazeo Bennett Jr.	8 receptions, 92 yards

=== at No. 16 Florida ===
South Carolina Gamecocks (2–3) at No. 16 Florida Gators (4–1) – Game summary

Quarter	1	2	3	4	Total
Gamecocks	7	10	14	7	38
No. 16 Gators	7	3	3	6	19

at Ben Hill Griffin Stadium • Gainesville, Florida

- Date: October 10
- Game time: 12:45 p.m.
- Game weather: Cloudy • Temperature: 84 °F (29 °C) • Wind: SSE at 8 miles per hour (13 km/h)
- Game attendance: 90,311
- Referee: Tim Barker
- TV announcers (SECN): Taylor Zarzour, Matt Stinchcomb, and Tori Petry

Game information

First quarter

- FLA – Bailey Stockton 59-yard pass from Aaron Philo (Patrick Durkin kick), 11:25. Gators 7–0. Drive: 3 plays, 63 yards, 0:50.
- SC – Nyck Harbor 15-yard pass from LaNorris Sellers (Malik Orsan kick), 0:12. Gators 7–7 Gamecocks. Drive: 10 plays, 65 yards, 3:40.

Second quarter

- FLA – Patrick Durkin 21-yard field goal, 8:50. Gators 10–7. Drive: 13 plays, 72 yards, 6:22.
- SC – Malik Orsan 37-yard field goal, 4:09. Gators 10–10 Gamecocks. Drive: 10 plays, 56 yards, 4:41.
- SC – Mazeo Bennett Jr. 12-yard pass from LaNorris Sellers (Malik Orsan kick), 1:47. Gamecocks 17–10. Drive: 5 plays, 26 yards, 1:42.

Third quarter

- FLA – Patrick Durkin 48-yard field goal, 11:17. Gamecocks 17–13. Drive: 9 plays, 45 yards, 3:43.
- SC – Donovan Murph 26-yard pass from LaNorris Sellers (Malik Orsan kick), 8:36. Gamecocks 24–13. Drive: 6 plays, 75 yards, 2:41.
- SC – LaNorris Sellers 1-yard run (Malik Orsan kick), 1:08. Gamecocks 31–13. Drive: 10 plays, 59 yards, 4:14.

Fourth quarter

- SC – Lex Cyrus 21-yard pass from LaNorris Sellers (Malik Orsan kick), 8:36. Gamecocks 38–13. Drive: 3 plays, 27 yards, 1:21.
- FLA – Jadan Baugh 2-yard run, 1:01. Gamecocks 38–19. Drive: 10 plays, 57 yards, 3:07.

Statistics	SC	FLA
First downs	22	20
Plays–yards	72–393	74–387
Rushes–yards	37–114	38–120
Passing yards	279	267
Passing: comp–att–int	23–35–0	27–36–2
Time of possession	30:37	29:23

Team	Category	Player	Statistics
South Carolina	Passing	LaNorris Sellers	23/35, 276 yards, 4 TD
South Carolina	Rushing	Matt Fuller	10 carries, 52 yards
South Carolina	Receiving	Nyck Harbor	4 receptions, 83 yards, TD
Florida	Passing	Aaron Philo	21/28, 227 yards, TD, INT
Florida	Rushing	Jadan Baugh	15 carries, 59 yards, TD
Florida	Receiving	Bailey Stockton	8 receptions, 127 yards, TD

=== vs No. 11 Tennessee ===
No. 11 Tennessee Volunteers (6–1) at South Carolina Gamecocks (3–3) – Game summary

Quarter	1	2	3	4	Total
No. 11 Volunteers	0	21	0	3	24
Gamecocks	14	3	0	10	27

at Williams–Brice Stadium • Columbia, South Carolina

- Date: October 24
- Game time: 3:30 p.m. ET
- Game weather: Sunny • Temperature: 71 °F (22 °C) • Wind: NE 9 miles per hour (14 km/h)
- Game attendance: 79,193
- Referee: David Smith
- TV announcers (ESPN): Wes Durham, Dusty Dvoracek, and Taylor McGregor

Statistics	TENN	SC
First downs	21	21
Plays–yards	73–320	63–344
Rushes–yards	50–184	31–134
Passing yards	136	210
Passing: comp–att–int	16–23–0	18–32–1
Turnovers	1	1
Time of possession	34:12	25:48

Team	Category	Player	Statistics
Tennessee	Passing	George MacIntyre	16/23, 136 yards
Tennessee	Rushing	DeSean Bishop	32 carries, 120 yards, TD
Tennessee	Receiving	Braylon Staley	6 receptions, 56 yards
South Carolina	Passing	LaNorris Sellers	18/32, 210 yards, TD, INT
South Carolina	Rushing	LaNorris Sellers	18 carries, 96 yards, 2 TD
South Carolina	Receiving	Mazeo Bennett	6 receptions, 88 yards, TD

=== at Oklahoma ===
Gene Chizik

South Carolina Gamecocks (4–3) at Oklahoma Sooners (4–3) – Game summary

Quarter	1	2	3	4	Total
Gamecocks	7	21	7	7	42
Sooners	0	10	0	15	25

at Gaylord Family Oklahoma Memorial Stadium • Norman, Oklahoma

- Date: October 31
- Game time: 4:15 p.m. ET
- Game weather: Rainy • Temperature: 63 °F (17 °C) • Wind: E 3 miles per hour (5 km/h)
- Game attendance: 83,189
- Referee: Tim Barker
- TV announcers (SECN): Taylor Zarzour, Gene Chizik, and Michella Chester

Game information

First Quarter

- (6:26) SC ― LaNorris Sellers 15 yard rush, Malik Orsan kick (Drive: 8 plays, 55 yards, 3:26; SC 7―0)

Second Quarter

- (14:05) OU ― Kip Lewis 30 yard INT return, Tate Sandell kick (Tied 7―7)
- (11:20) SC ― Christian Clark 1 yard rush, Malik Orsan kick (Drive: 6 plays, 75 yards, 2:45; SC 14―7)
- (9:19) SC ― DJ Black 84 yard pass from LaNorris Sellers, Malik Orsan kick (Drive: 3 plays, 82 yards, 1:23; SC 21―7)
- (2:49) OU ― Tate Sandell 52 yard field goal (Drive: 12 plays, 41 yards, 6:30; SC 21―10)
- (0:16) SC ― Nyck Harbor 8 yard pass from LaNorris Sellers, Mallik Orsan kick (Drive: 8 plays, 75 yards, 2:33; SC 28―10)

Third Quarter

- (2:04) SC ― LaNorris Sellers 11 yard rush, Malik Orsan kick (Drive: 12 plays, 75 yards, 5:38; SC 35―10)

Fourth Quarter

- (14:53) OU ― Ivan Carreon 34 yard pass from John Mateer, John Mateer pass attempt failed (Drive: 3 plays 80 yards, 1:34; SC 35―16)
- (13:13) SC ― Mazeo Bennett Jr. 79 yard pass from LaNorris Sellers, Malik Orsan kick (Drive: 3 plays, 80 yards, 1:34; SC 42―16)
- (9:46) OU ― Tate Sandell 34 yard field goal (Drive: 11 plays, 59 yards, 3:27; SC 42―19)
- (2:59) OU ― Ivan Carreon 10 yard pass from John Mateer, John Mateer pass attempt failed (Drive: 11 plays, 84 yards, 2:59; SC 42―25)

Statistics	SC	OU
First downs	22	24
Plays–yards	71-521	76-359
Rushes–yards	44-212	31-115
Passing yards	309	244
Passing: comp–att–int	21-27-3	26-43-0
Time of possession	32:14	27:46

Team	Category	Player	Statistics
South Carolina	Passing	LaNorris Sellers	19/24, 301 yards, 3 TD, 2 INT
South Carolina	Rushing	LaNorris Sellers	13 carries, 96 yards, 2 TD
South Carolina	Receiving	Mazeo Bennett	4 receptions, 107 yards, 2 TD
Oklahoma	Passing	John Mateer	26/43, 244 yards, 2 TD
Oklahoma	Rushing	Tory Blaylock	6 carries, 32 yards
Oklahoma	Receiving	Ivan Carreon	5 receptions, 88 yards, 2 TD

=== vs Texas A&M ===
Texas A&M Aggies (4–4) at No. 21 South Carolina Gamecocks (5–3) – Game summary

Quarter	1	2	3	4	Total
Aggies	0	6	3	0	9
No. 21 Gamecocks	0	7	0	10	17

at Williams–Brice Stadium • Columbia, South Carolina

- Date: November 7
- TV announcers (ESPN): Roy Philpott, Brock Osweiler, and Stormy Buonantony

Statistics	TAMU	SC
First downs	26	17
Plays–yards	86-457	58-360
Rushes–yards	43-206	27-109
Passing yards	251	251
Passing: comp–att–int	25-43-0	20-31-0
Time of possession	34:36	25:24

Team	Category	Player	Statistics
Texas A&M	Passing	Marcel Reed	25/43, 251 yards, 0 TD, 0 INT
Texas A&M	Rushing	Rueben Owens II	19 carries, 137 yards, 0 TD
Texas A&M	Receiving	Isaiah Horton	5 receptions, 78 yards, 0 TD
South Carolina	Passing	LaNorris Sellers	20/31, 251 yards, 1 TD, 0 INT
South Carolina	Rushing	Isaiah Augustave	10 carries, 50 yards, 0 TD
South Carolina	Receiving	Nyck Habor	4 receptions, 70 yards, 0 TD

=== at Arkansas ===
No. 17 South Carolina Gamecocks (6–3) at Arkansas Razorbacks (3–6) – Game summary

Quarter	1	2	3	4	Total
No. 17 Gamecocks	0	0	6	0	6
Razorbacks	0	17	7	10	34

at Donald W. Reynolds Razorback Stadium • Fayetteville, Arkansas

- Date: November 14
- TV announcers (SECN): Dave Neal, Cole Cubelic, and Tori Petry

Statistics	SC	ARK
First downs	19	21
Plays–yards	73-369	70-355
Rushes–yards	30-98	46-167
Passing yards	271	188
Passing: comp–att–int	24-43-3	15-24-0
Time of possession	27:14	32:46

Team	Category	Player	Statistics
South Carolina	Passing	Cutter Woods	24/43, 271 yards, 0 TD, 3 INT
South Carolina	Rushing	Jabree Coleman	16 rushes, 77 yards, 1 TD
South Carolina	Receiving	Mazeo Bennett Jr.	4 receptions, 61 yards, 0 TD
Arkansas	Passing	KJ Jackson	15/24, 188 yards, 2 TD, 0 INT
Arkansas	Rushing	Cam Settles	17 rushes, 64 yards, 0 TD
Arkansas	Receiving	Chris Marshall	4 receptions, 63 yards, 1 TD

=== vs No. 1 Georgia (rivalry) ===
No. 1 Georgia Bulldogs (9–1) at No. 21 South Carolina Gamecocks (6–4) – Game summary

Quarter	1	2	3	Total
No. 1 Bulldogs			0	0
No. 21 Gamecocks			0	0

at Williams–Brice Stadium • Columbia, South Carolina

- Date: November 21
- Game time: 7:30 p.m.
- Referee: Daniel Gautreaux
- TV announcers (ABC): Chris Fowler, Kirk Herbstreit, and Laura Rutledge

Statistics	UGA	SC
First downs		
Plays–yards		
Rushes–yards		
Passing yards		
Passing: comp–att–int		
Time of possession		

Team	Category	Player	Statistics
Georgia	Passing		
Georgia	Rushing		
Georgia	Receiving		
South Carolina	Passing		
South Carolina	Rushing		
South Carolina	Receiving		

=== at Clemson (Palmetto Bowl) ===
South Carolina Gamecocks (6–5) at Clemson Tigers (7–4) – Game summary

Quarter	1	2	Total
Gamecocks			0
Tigers			0

at Memorial Stadium • Clemson, South Carolina

- Date: November 28

Statistics	SC	CLEM
First downs		
Plays–yards		
Rushes–yards		
Passing yards		
Passing: comp–att–int		
Time of possession		

Team	Category	Player	Statistics
South Carolina	Passing		
South Carolina	Rushing		
South Carolina	Receiving		
Clemson	Passing		
Clemson	Rushing		
Clemson	Receiving		
