= 2025 South Carolina Gamecocks football team =

American college football season

2025 South Carolina Gamecocks football
- Conference: Southeastern Conference
- Record: 4–8 (1–7 SEC)
- Head coach: Shane Beamer (5th season)
- Offensive coordinator: Mike Shula (1st season; first 9 games)
- Offensive scheme: Power spread
- Defensive coordinator: Clayton White (5th season)
- Base defense: 4–2–5
- Home stadium: Williams–Brice Stadium

Uniform
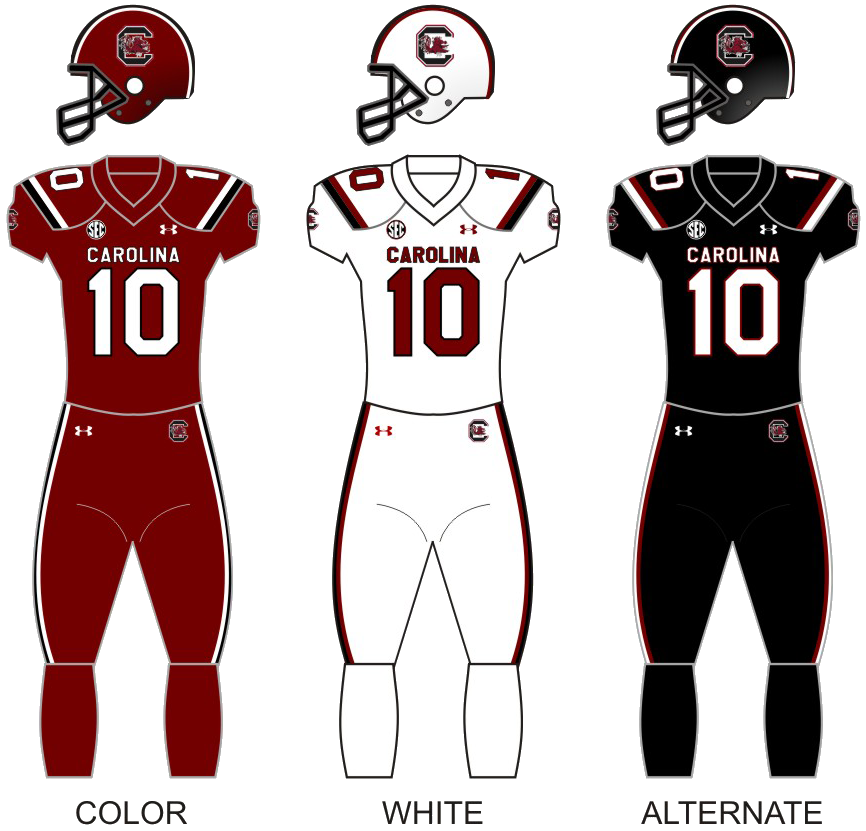

2025 Southeastern Conference football standings
	Conf.			Overall
Team	W		L	W		L
No. 9 Alabama y^	7	–	1	11	–	4
No. 6 Georgia y$^	7	–	1	12	–	2
No. 3 Ole Miss ^	7	–	1	13	–	2
No. 8 Texas A&M ^	7	–	1	11	–	2
No. 13 Oklahoma ^	6	–	2	10	–	3
No. 12 Texas	6	–	2	10	–	3
No. 15 Vanderbilt	6	–	2	10	–	3
Missouri	4	–	4	8	–	5
Tennessee	4	–	4	8	–	5
LSU	3	–	5	7	–	6
Kentucky	2	–	6	5	–	7
Florida	2	–	6	4	–	8
Auburn	1	–	7	5	–	7
Mississippi State	1	–	7	5	–	8
South Carolina	1	–	7	4	–	8
Arkansas	0	–	8	2	–	10
Championship: Georgia 28, Alabama 7
^ – College Football Playoff participant; $ – Conference champion; y – Championship game participant; Rankings from AP Poll

The 2025 South Carolina Gamecocks football team represented the University of South Carolina as a member of the Southeastern Conference (SEC) during the 2025 NCAA Division I FBS football season. The Gamecocks played their home games at Williams–Brice Stadium located in Columbia, South Carolina, and were led by Shane Beamer, who was in his fifth year as their head coach. The Gamecocks received their first preseason ranking since the 2014 football season. After defeating Virginia Tech in their season opener, South Carolina rose to the top 10 of the AP poll for the first time since 2014. However, after starting 2–0, the team would lose seven of its next eight games, falling out of the top 25 and guaranteeing a losing season.

The South Carolina Gamecocks drew an average home attendance of 79,334, the 14th-highest of all college football teams.

== Offseason ==
Positions key
Offense	Defense	Special teams
QB — Quarterback; RB — Running back; FB — Fullback; WR — Wide receiver; TE — Tight end; OL — Offensive lineman; T — Tackle; G — Guard; C — Center	DL — Defensive lineman; DT — Defensive tackle (Note: Includes nose tackle (NT)); DE — Defensive end; EDGE — Edge rusher; LB — Linebacker (Note: Includes middle linebacker (MLB/MIKE), weakside linebacker (WILL), strongside linebacker (SAM), off-ball linebacker, and outside linebacker (OLB)); DB — Defensive back; CB — Cornerback; S — Safety (Note: Includes free safety (FS) and strong safety (SS))	K — Kicker (Note: Also known as a placekicker (PK)); P — Punter; LS — Long snapper; RS — Return specialist (Note: Includes kickoff and punt returners)

=== Departures ===
==== Team departures ====
2025 South Carolina offseason departures
Name	Pos.	Height	Weight	Year	Hometown	Notes
Nick Emmanwori	S	6'3	220	Junior	Greensboro, NC	Declared by 2025 NFL Draft
T. J. Sanders	DT	6'4	297	Senior	Marion, SC	Graduated/Declared by 2025 NFL Draft
Demetrius Knight	LB	6'2	245	Graduated Student	Atlanta, GA	Graduated/Declared by 2025 NFL Draft
Kyle Kennard	DE	6′4	254	Fifth Year	Flint, MI	Graduated/Declared by 2025 NFL Draft
Tonka Hemingway	DT	6'3	284	Redshirt Senior	Conway, SC	Graduated/Declared by 2025 NFL Draft
Raheim Sanders	RB	6′0	230	Senior	Rockledge, FL	Graduated
Alex Huntley	DT	6'4	298	Redshirt Senior	Blythewood, SC	Graduated
O'Donnell Fortune	DB	6′1	185	Redshirt Senior	Sumter, SC	Graduated
Joshua Simon	TE	6'4	239	Sixth Year	Dalzell, SC	Graduated
Gage Larvadain	WR	5'9	180	Senior	Donaldsonville, LA	Graduated
Kai Kroeger	P	6'4	213	Fifth Year	Lake Forest, IL	Graduated
Dalevon Campbell	WR	6′4	220	Sixth Year	Missouri City, TX	Graduated
Torricelli Simpkins III	OL	6'5	319	Redshirt Senior	Charlotte, NC	Graduated
Bam Martin-Scott	LB	6′2	241	Sixth Year	Fort Wayne, IN	Graduated
Debo Williams	LB	6′1	232	Redshirt Senior	Smyrna, DE	Graduated
Mohamed Kaba	LB	6′3	241	Redshirt Senior	Clinton, NC	Graduated
Alex Herrera	K	6'0	198	Sixth Year	Columbia, SC	Graduated
Juju McDowell	RB	5'9	184	Senior	Bainbridge, GA	Graduated
Davis Beville	QB	6'6	232	Sixth Year	Greenville, SC	Graduated
Gilber Edmond	EDGE	6′4	255	Redshirt Senior	Fort Pierce, FL	Graduated
Vershon Lee	OL	6'4	314	Redshirt Senior	Woodbridge, VA	Graduated

==== Outgoing transfers ====
Name	No.	Pos.	Height	Weight	Hometown	Year	New school	Source
Reid Mikeska	86	TE	6'5"	201	Cypress, TX	Redshirt Freshman	Florida Atlantic	
Payton Mangrum	13	WR	5'11"	201	Greenville, SC	Redshirt Senior	East Carolina	
Wendell Gregory	10	EDGE	6'3"	245	Marietta, GA	Freshman	Oklahoma State	
Bangally Kamara	18	LB	6'2"	200	Akron, OH	Senior	Kansas	
Djay Braswell	23	RB	6'0"	210	Sandersville, GA	Sophomore	Georgia State	
Ronnie Porter	41	LB	6'1"	241	Columbia, SC	Redshirt Junior	Appalachian State	
Emory Floyd	8	DB	6'1"	195	Powder Springs, GA	Redshirt Sophomore	Appalachian State	
Dante Reno	10	QB	6'2"	214	Sturbridge, MA	Freshman	Yale	
Robby Ashford	1	QB	6'2"	229	Hoover, AL	Redshirt Senior	Wake Forest	
Jakai Moore	55	OL	6'6"	306	Nokesville, VA	Redshirt Senior	North Carolina	
Kam Pringle	54	OL	6'8"	345	Dorchester, SC	Freshman	Syracuse	
Tyshawn Russell	21	WR	5'11"	195	Harrisburg, PA	Sophomore	Syracuse	
Connor Cox	18	TE	6'6"	251	Jacksonville, FL	Sophomore	North Carolina	
Aaryn Parks	60	OL	6'5"	303	Seat Pleasant, MD	Redshirt Senior	Southern Miss	
Debron Gatling	17	WR	5'11"	195	Alpharetta, GA	Freshman	Georgia Tech	
Tanner Bailey	15	QB	6'1"	215	Gordo, AL	Redshirt Sophomore	Auburn	

==== Coaching staff departures ====
Name	Position	New Team	New Position
Dowell Loggains	Offensive coordinator/Quarter backs coach	Accepted job at Appalachian State	Head coach

=== Entered NFL draft ===
The deadline for players to declare for the NFL draft was January 15, 2025.

Five South Carolina players were drafted in 2025.

During the second round of the draft that April, safety Nick Emmanwori was the 35th pick overall, selected by the Seattle Seahawks; defensive tackle T. J. Sanders (#41) was selected by the Buffalo Bills, linebacker Demetrius Knight was selected (#49) by the Cincinnati Bengals; in the fourth round, safety Kyle Kennard (#125) was selected by the Los Angeles Chargers; defensive tackle Tonka Hemingway (#135) was selected by the Las Vegas Raiders.

Player	Position	Round	Pick	Drafted by
Nick Emmanwori	S	2	35	Seattle Seahawks
T. J. Sanders	DT	2	41	Buffalo Bills
Demetrius Knight	LB	2	49	Cincinnati Bengals
Kyle Kennard	DE	4	125	Los Angeles Chargers
Tonka Hemingway	DT	4	135	Las Vegas Raiders

=== Incoming transfers ===
Name	Pos.	Height	Weight	Hometown	Year	Prev school	Source
Isaiah Augustave	RB	6'2"	193	Naples, FL	Sophomore	Colorado	
Demon Clowney	EDGE	6'4"	255	Baltimore, MD	Redshirt Senior	Louisville	
George Wilson	EDGE	6'4"	230	Virginia Beach, VA	Redshirt Junior	Campbell	
Troy Pikes	DL	6'3"	270	Atlanta, GA	Redshirt Freshman	Georgia Southern	
Nolan Hay	OL	6'4"	300	Katy, TX	Junior	Incarnate Word	
Boaz Stanley	OL	6'5"	265	Bogart, GA	Junior	Troy	
Nick Sharpe	OL	6'2"	297	Gastonia, NC	Redshirt Junior	Wake Forest	
Rodney Newsom	OL	6'3"	290	Memphis, TN	Redshirt Senior	Western Kentucky	
Davonte Miles	LB	6'5"	275	River Rouge, MI	Redshirt Sophomore	Bowling Green	
Rahsul Faison	RB	6'0"	181	Pottstown, PA	Redshirt Senior	Utah State	
Justin Okoronkwo	LB	6'3"	225	Munich, BY	Freshman	Alabama	
Myles Norwood	DB	6'2"	170	Saint Louis, MO	Redshirt Junior	Ball State	
Jordan Dingle	TE	6'4"	235	Bowling Green, KY	Redshirt Junior	Kentucky	
Brandon Cisse	DB	6'0"	175	Sumter, SC	Sophomore	NC State	
Jaylen Brown	EDGE	6'6"	255	Madison, AL	Freshman	Missouri	
Gabriel Brownlow-Dindy	DL	6'3"	279	Lakeland, FL	Redshirt Sophomore	Texas A&M	
Air Noland	QB	6'2"	195	Fairburn, GA	Freshman	Ohio State	
Shawn Murphy	LB	6'3"	205	Manassas, VA	Redshirt Sophomore	Florida State	

== Schedule ==
Date	Time	Opponent	Rank	Site	TV	Result	Attendance
August 31	3:00 p.m.	vs. Virginia Tech*	No. 13	Mercedes-Benz Stadium; Atlanta, GA (Aflac Kickoff Game)	ESPN	W 24–11	55,531
September 6	7:00 p.m.	South Carolina State*	No. 10	Williams–Brice Stadium; Columbia, SC	SECN+/ESPN+	W 38–10	79,705
September 13	7:45 p.m.	Vanderbilt	No. 11	Williams–Brice Stadium; Columbia, SC	SECN	L 7–31	79,873
September 20	7:00 p.m.	at No. 23 Missouri		Faurot Field; Columbia, MO	ESPN	L 20–29	57,321
September 27	7:45 p.m.	Kentucky		Williams–Brice Stadium; Columbia, SC	SECN	W 35–13	79,266
October 11	7:45 p.m.	at No. 11 LSU		Tiger Stadium; Baton Rouge, LA	SECN	L 10–20	101,921
October 18	12:45 p.m.	No. 14 Oklahoma		Williams–Brice Stadium; Columbia, SC	SECN	L 7–26	78,680
October 25	3:30 p.m.	No. 4 Alabama		Williams–Brice Stadium; Columbia, SC	ABC	L 22–29	79,537
November 1	7:00 p.m.	at No. 7 Ole Miss		Vaught–Hemingway Stadium; Oxford, MS	ESPN	L 14–30	67,491
November 15	12:00 p.m.	at No. 3 Texas A&M		Kyle Field; College Station, TX	ESPN	L 30–31	108,582
November 22	4:15 p.m.	Coastal Carolina*		Williams–Brice Stadium; Columbia, SC	SECN	W 51–7	78,452
November 29	12:00 p.m.	Clemson*		Williams–Brice Stadium; Columbia, SC (Palmetto Bowl)	SECN	L 14–28	79,827
*Non-conference game; Rankings from AP Poll (and CFP Rankings, after November 4) - Released prior to game; All times are in Eastern time

== Personnel ==
=== Coaching staff ===
Name	Position	Consecutive season
Shane Beamer	Head coach	5th
Mike Shula	Offensive coordinator and quarterbacks coach	1st
Clayton White	Defensive coordinator and inside linebackers coach	5th
Joe DeCamillis	Associate head coach/special teams coordinator	2nd
Torrian Gray	Defensive backs coach	5th
Marquel Blackwell	Running backs coach	2nd
Lonnie Teasley	Offensive line coach	3rd
Mike Furrey	Wide receivers coach	2nd
Shawn Elliot	Run Game coordinator and Tight ends coach	2nd
Travian Robertson	Defensive Lines coach	3rd
Sterling Lucas	Defensive Run Game coordinator, Defensive Ends coach, Outside Linebackers coach	4th

=== Roster ===
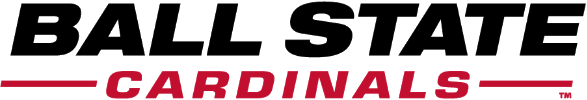
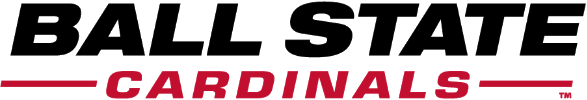
2025 South Carolina Gamecocks Football Roster
Quarterback: 11 Air Noland – (redshirt) Freshman (6'3, 225); 15 Cutter Woods – Freshman (6'3, 204); 16 LaNorris Sellers – (redshirt) Sophomore (6'3, 240); 25 Jimmy Francis – (redshirt) Freshman (5'10, 186); Running back: 1 Rahsul Faison – Graduate (6'0, 218); 22 Jawarn Howell – (redshirt) Sophomore (6'1, 225); 23 Isaiah Augustave – Junior (6'2, 210); 26 Nathan Harris-Waynick – (redshirt) Senior (5'10, 205); 27 Oscar Adaway III – Graduate (5'11, 219); 28 Matt Fuller – (redshirt) Freshman (5'11, 220); 31 Neil Salvage III – (redshirt) Freshman (5'9, 194); 32 Bradley Dunn – Graduate (5'9, 206); 35 Chase McCracken – (redshirt) Junior (5'11, 208); 39 Larry Scott – (redshirt) Senior (5'11, 219); Wide receiver: 0 Lex Cyrus – Freshman (5'10, 175); 3 Mazeo Bennett Jr. – Sophomore (5'10, 185); 4 Vandrevius Jacobs – (redshirt) Sophomore (6'0, 182); 6 Donovan Murph – Freshman (6'2, 195); 7 Jordon Gidron – Freshman (6'2, 190); 8 Nyck Harbor – Junior (6'5, 235); 12 Eriq Rice – (redshirt) Senior (6'2, 201); 13 Malik Clark – Freshman (6'2, 190); 14 Jared Brown – (redshirt) Senior (6'0, 195); 17 Jayden Sellers – Freshman (5'11, 175); 18 Brian Rowe Jr. – Freshman (6'0, 170); 82 Jackson Repp – Freshman (5'9, 175); 83 Emazon Littlejohn – (redshirt) Freshman (6'0, 188); Athlete: 9 Luke Doty – Graduate (6'2, 215); 34 Brandon Cunningham – Freshman (6'2, 180); Placekicker/Punter: 21 Max Kelley – Freshman (6'2, 223); 24 Mason Love – (redshirt) Sophomore (6'1, 191); 45 William Joyce – (redshirt) Senior (6'3, 219); 48 Peyton Argent – (redshirt) Sophomore (6'0, 217)	Tight end: 4 Michael Smith – Sophomore (6'6, 248); 5 Jordan Dingle – (redshirt) Senior (6'4, 242); 20 Mike Tyler – Freshman (6'4, 250); 44 Maurice Brown II – Junior (6'4, 240); 80 Lukas Vozeh – (redshirt) Sophomore (6'3, 246); 81 Reno Roehm – (redshirt) Freshman (6'7, 255); 87 Brady Hunt – (redshirt) Senior (6'5, 248) ; Offensive Lineman: 50 Boaz Stanley – (redshirt) Junior (6'3, 325); 51 Tree Babalade (redshirt) Sophomore (6'5, 330); 52 Nick Sharpe – (redshirt) Senior (6'2, 340); 55 Damola Ajidahun – Freshman (6'6, 325); 58 Markee Anderson – (redshirt) Sophomore (6'4, 326); 62 Nolan Hay – Senior (6'3, 309); 63 Parker Lawson – (redshirt) Sophomore (6'4, 300); 65 Rodney Newsom Jr. – Sixth Year (6'3, 310); 66 Mac Walters – (redshirt) Junior (6'6, 313); 67 Chase Sweigart – (redshirt) Junior (6'6, 304); 68 Campbell Vandiver – (redshirt) Sophomore (6'8, 312); 70 Jake Recker – (redshirt) Freshman (6'5, 321); 71 Blake Franks – (redshirt) Freshman (6'5, 336); 72 Shedrick Sarratt Jr. – Freshman (6'4, 336); 73 Ryan Brubaker – (redshirt) Junior (6'5, 313); 74 Josiah Thompson – Sophomore (6'7, 300); 75 Cason Henry – (redshirt) Junior (6'6, 310); 77 Jatavius Shivers – (redshirt) Sophomore (6'6, 325); 78 Trovon Baugh – Junior (6'3, 335); Defensive Lineman: 44 Monkell Goodwine – (redshirt) Senior (6'4, 305); 90 Davonte Miles – (redshirt) Junior (6'4, 280); 93 Nick Barrett – (redshirt) Senior (6'3, 322); 94 Zavion Hardy – Junior (6'5, 290); 95 Christian Ingram – Freshman (6'6, 310); 99 Gabriel Brownlow-Dindy – (redshirt) Junior (6'3, 315); Defensive Tackle: 33 Troy Pikes – (redshirt) Sophomore (6'3, 290); 59 Chase Kibble – (redshirt) Freshman (6'5, 285); 88 Caleb Williams – Freshman (6'5, 290)	EDGE: 12 Jatius Geer – (redshirt) Senior (6'6, 250); 22 Jaquavious Dodd – Freshman (6'6, 240); 46 Bryan Thomas Jr. – Senior (6'2, 249); EDGE rusher: 6 Dylan Stewart – Sophomore (6'5, 245); 9 Desmond Umeozulu – Junior (6'6, 255); 10 George Wilson Jr. – (redshirt) Senior (6'4, 230); 30 Demon Clowney – Graduate (6'4, 255); 40 Anthony Addison – Freshman (6'4, 230); 41 Kobby Sakyi-Prah – Freshman (6'3, 225); 91 Jaylen Brown – Sophomore (6'5, 265); Linebacker: 0 Fred "JayR" Johnson – Sophomore (6'3, 244); 7 Shawn Murphy – (redshirt) Junior (6'3, 231); 14 Jaron Willis - (redshirt) Junior (6'2, 254); 17 Justin Okoronkwo – Sophomore (6'3, 231); 20 Josh Smith – Freshman (6'2, 240); 27 Donovan Darden – Freshman (6'4, 230); 28 Andrew Colasurdo – (redshirt) Senior (6'1, 235); 29 Taeshawn Alston – Freshman (6'3, 245); 32 AJ Holloway – Freshman (6'2, 243); 34 Jamian Risher Jr. – (redshirt) Junior (6'1, 232); 45 Colin Bryant – (redshirt) Junior (6'2, 230); Defensive back: 1 DQ Smith – Senior (6'1, 219); 3 Myles Norwood – (redshirt) Senior (6'1, 183) ; 4 Vicari Swain – (redshirt) Sophomore (6'1, 190); 5 Kendall Daniels Jr. – Freshman (6'4, 205); 8 Judge Collier – Junior (6'2, 201); 11 Buddy Mack III – Graduate (6'0, 214); 13 David Bucey – Sophomore (6'0, 202); 15 Brandon Cisse – Junior (6'0, 190); 16 Jalewis Solomon – (redshirt) Freshman (6'1, 187); 18 Jaquel Holman – Freshman (6'1, 204); 19 Damarcus Leach – Freshman (6'3, 193); 21 Kelvin Hunter – (redshirt) Freshman (6'0, 200); 23 Gerald Kilgore – (redshirt) Junior (6'0, 210); 24 Jalon Kilgore – Junior (6'1, 211); 25 Zahbari Sandy – (redshirt) Sophomore (6'2, 221); 26 Isaiah McClary – (redshirt) Freshman (6'1, 169); 31 Peyton Williams – (redshirt) Junior (6'0, 209); 35 Jackson Burger – (redshirt) Freshman (6'1, 200); 36 Landon Kurtz – (redshirt) Freshman (6'2, 196); 39 Chris Hatfield – Freshman (6'3, 210); 42 Cedric Cisse – Freshman (5'11, 180); 43 Tony Brown – Freshman (5'11, 185); Long snappers: 29 Gunnar Yocum – (redshirt) Freshman (6'0, 199); 33 Kyler Farrow – Freshman (6'3, 209); 46 Cole Rasmussen – Graduate (6'2, 210)
: 2025 South Carolina Gamecocks Football Roster 10/14/25

== Rankings ==
Ranking movements Legend: ██ Increase in ranking ██ Decrease in ranking — = Not ranked RV = Received votes
	Week																
Poll	Pre	1	2	3	4	5	6	7	8	9	10	11	12	13	14	15	Final
AP	13	10	11	RV	—	—	—	—	—	—	—	—	—	—	—	—	—
Coaches	13	11	10	24	—	—	—	—	—	—	—	—	—	—	—	—	—
CFP	Not released										—	—	—	—	—	—	Not released

== Game summaries ==
=== vs. Virginia Tech ===
Virginia Tech Hokies (0–0) vs No. 13 South Carolina Gamecocks (0–0) – Game summary

Quarter	1	2	3	4	Total
Hokies	2	6	0	3	11
No. 13 Gamecocks	7	3	0	14	24

at Mercedes-Benz Stadium • Atlanta, Georgia

- Date: Sunday, August 31
- Game time: 3:00 p.m.
- Game weather: Sunny (retractable roof open)
- Game attendance: 55,531
- Referee: Michael VanderVelde
- TV announcers (ESPN): Bob Wischusen (play-by-play), Louis Riddick (analyst), and Kris Budden (sideline reporter)

Game information

First quarter

- SC – LaNorris Sellers 15-yard run (William Joyce kick), 12:09. Gamecocks 7–0. Drive: 7 plays, 75 yards, 2:51.
- VT – Team Safety, 4:33. Gamecocks 7–2.

Second quarter

- VT – John Love 29-yard field goal, 13:45. Gamecocks 7–5. Drive: 8 plays, 59 yards, 2:32.
- SC – William Joyce 27-yard field goal, 3:42. Gamecocks 10–5. Drive: 13 plays, 70 yards, 5:01.
- VT – John Love 56-yard field goal, 0:00. Gamecocks 10–8. Drive: 11 plays, 37 yards, 3:42.

Third quarter

No scoring plays.

Fourth quarter

- SC – Vicari Swain 80-yard punt return (William Joyce kick), 13:36. Gamecocks 17–8.
- VT – John Love 39-yard field goal, 9:00. Gamecocks 17–11. Drive: 9 plays, 58 yards, 4:36.
- SC – Nyck Harbor 64-yard pass from LaNorris Sellers (William Joyce kick), 7:42. Gamecocks 24–11. Drive: 3 plays, 75 yards, 1:18.

Statistics	VT	SC
First downs	19	16
Plays–yards	72–336	56–328
Rushes–yards	37–115	37–119
Passing yards	221	209
Passing: comp–att–int	15–35–2	12–19–0
Turnovers	2	0
Time of possession	34:09	25:51

Team	Category	Player	Statistics
Virginia Tech	Passing	Kyron Drones	15/35, 221 yards, 2 INT
Virginia Tech	Rushing	Marcellous Hawkins	15 carries, 58 yards
Virginia Tech	Receiving	Donavon Greene	3 receptions, 94 yards
South Carolina	Passing	LaNorris Sellers	12/19, 209 yards, TD
South Carolina	Rushing	Oscar Adaway III	14 carries, 60 yards
South Carolina	Receiving	Nyck Harbor	3 Receptions, 99 yards, TD

=== vs South Carolina State (FCS) ===
South Carolina State Bulldogs (FCS) (1–0) at No. 10 South Carolina Gamecocks (1–0) – Game summary

Quarter	1	2	3	4	Total
Bulldogs (FCS)	3	0	0	7	10
No. 10 Gamecocks	0	17	21	0	38

at Williams–Brice Stadium • Columbia, South Carolina

- Date: September 6
- Game time: 7:00 p.m.
- Game weather: Clear, 86 F
- Game attendance: 79,705
- Referee: Lee Hedrick
- TV announcers (SECN+/ESPN+): Kevin Fitzgerald (play-by-play), Charles Arbuckle (analyst), and Ashley Stroehlein (sideline reporter)

Game information

First quarter

- SCST – Nico Cavanillas Alti 21–yard field goal, 01:32. Bulldogs 3–0. Drive: 9 plays, 54 yards, 04:02.

Second quarter

- SC – Vicari Swain 65-yard punt return (William Joyce kick), 05:01. Gamecocks 7–3.
- SC – Vicari Swain 42-yard punt return (William Joyce kick), 03:07. Gamecocks 14–3.
- SC – William Joyce 49-yard field goal, 3:42. Gamecocks 17–3. Drive: 9 plays, 44 yards, 01:44.

Third quarter

- SC – Oscar Adaway III 5-yard run (William Joyce kick), 11:23. Gamecocks 24–3. Drive: 8 plays, 65 yards, 03:36.
- SC – Jaron Willis 46-yard fumble return (William Joyce kick), 06:02. Gamecocks 31–3.
- SC – Vandrevius Jacobs 35-yard pass from LaNorris Sellers (William Joyce kick), 02:25. Gamecocks 38–3. Drive: 5 plays, 52 yards, 02:05.

Fourth quarter

- SCST – Nicholas Sowell 9-yard pass from Ryan Stubblefield (Elliott Janish kick), 12:32. Gamecocks 38–10. Drive: 5 plays, 52 yards, 02:22.

Statistics	SCST	SC
First downs	13	16
Plays–yards	62–270	56–253
Rushes–yards	34–62	36–125
Passing yards	208	128
Passing: comp–att–int	18–28–0	11–20–0
Turnovers	1	0
Time of possession	34:39	25:21

Team	Category	Player	Statistics
South Carolina State	Passing	William Atkins IV	10/14, 118 yards
South Carolina State	Rushing	Kacy Fields	5 carries, 19 yards
South Carolina State	Receiving	Jalen Johnson	5 receptions, 67 yards
South Carolina	Passing	LaNorris Sellers	11/19, 128 yards, TD
South Carolina	Rushing	Jawarn Howell	7 carries, 30 yards
South Carolina	Receiving	Vandrevius Jacobs	4 receptions, 57 yards, TD

=== vs Vanderbilt ===
Vanderbilt Commodores (2–0) at No. 11 South Carolina Gamecocks (2–0) – Game summary

Quarter	1	2	3	4	Total
Commodores	7	7	7	10	31
No. 11 Gamecocks	7	0	0	0	7

at Williams–Brice Stadium • Columbia, South Carolina

- Date: September 13
- Game time: 7:45 p.m.
- Game weather: Clear • Temperature: 75 °F (24 °C) • Wind: NE at 3 miles per hour (4.8 km/h)
- Game attendance: 79,873
- Referee: Daniel Gautreaux
- TV announcers (SECN): Tom Hart (play-by-play), Jordan Rodgers (analyst), and Cole Cubelic (sideline)

Game information

First quarter

- VAN – Sedrick Alexander 18-yard pass from Diego Pavia (Brock Taylor kick), 9:33. Commodores 7–0. Drive: 9 plays, 73 yards, 5:22.
- SC – Rahsul Faison 7-yard run (William Joyce kick), 5:58. Tied 7–7. Drive: 7 plays, 75 yards, 3:35.

Second quarter

- VAN – Junior Sherrill 5-yard pass from Diego Pavia (Brock Taylor kick), 1:56. Commodores 14–7. Drive: 12 plays, 76 yards, 5:59.

Third quarter

- VAN – Jamezell Lassiter 44-yard run (Brock Taylor kick), 10:48. Commodores 21–7. Drive: 4 plays, 75 yards, 2:20.

Fourth quarter

- VAN – Brock Taylor 51-yard field goal, 9:31. Commodores 24–7. Drive: 6 plays, 18 yards, 3:48.
- VAN – Sedrick Alexander 2-yard run (Brock Taylor kick), 5:29. Commodores 31–7. Drive: 5 plays, 37 yards, 2:29.

Statistics	VAN	SC
First downs	22	20
Plays–yards	63–323	63–328
Rushes–yards	37–146	29–86
Passing yards	177	242
Passing: comp–att–int	18–26–1	24–34–2
Turnovers	1	4
Time of possession	35:43	24:17

Team	Category	Player	Statistics
Vanderbilt	Passing	Diego Pavia	18–27, 177 yards, 2 TD, INT
Vanderbilt	Rushing	Jamezell Lassiter	1 carry, 44 yards, TD
Vanderbilt	Receiving	Eli Stowers	3 receptions, 45 yards
South Carolina	Passing	Luke Doty	18–27, 148 yards, INT
South Carolina	Rushing	Rahsul Faison	15 carries, 74 yards, TD
South Carolina	Receiving	Nyck Harbor	4 receptions, 66 yards

=== at No. 23 Missouri ===
South Carolina Gamecocks (2–1) at No. 23 Missouri Tigers (3–0) – Game summary

Quarter	1	2	3	4	Total
Gamecocks	0	14	6	0	20
No. 23 Tigers	0	12	6	11	29

at Faurot Field • Columbia, Missouri

- Date: September 20
- Game time: 7:00 p.m.
- Game weather: Mostly sunny, 83 degrees, 7 mph SSW
- Game attendance: 57,321
- Referee: Ken Williamson
- TV announcers (ESPN): Dave Pasch (play-by-play), Dusty Dvoracek (analyst), and Taylor McGregor (sideline reporter)

Game information

First quarter

No scoring plays

Second quarter

- MIZ – Joshua Manning 8-yard pass from Beau Pribula (Robert Meyer PAT failed), 14:24. Tigers 6–0. Drive: 9 plays, 99 yards, 4:38.
- SC – Vandrevius Jacobs 49-yard pass from LaNorris Sellers (William Joyce kick), 11:26. Gamecocks 7–6. Drive: 6 plays, 67 yards, 2:52.
- MIZ – Robert Meyer 23-yard field goal, 5:54. Tigers 9–7. Drive: 11 plays, 60 yards, 5:32.
- SC – Brian Rowe Jr. 24-yard pass from LaNorris Sellers (William Joyce kick), 2:31. Gamecocks 14–9. Drive: 4 plays, 70 yards, 1:15.
- MIZ – Robert Meyer 22-yard field goal, 0:17. Gamecocks 14–12. Drive: 11 plays, 71 yards, 2:14.

Third quarter

- SC – William Joyce 32-yard field goal, 8:27. Gamecocks 17–12. Drive: 8 plays, 49 yards, 4:23.
- MIZ – Ahmad Hardy 5-yard run (run failed), 5:34. Tigers 18–17. Drive: 6 plays, 75 yards, 2:53.
- SC – William Joyce 36-yard field goal, 0:18. Gamecocks 20–18. Drive: 9 plays, 56 yards, 5:10.

Fourth quarter

- MIZ – Jamal Roberts 16-yard run (Beau Pribula run), 9:32. Tigers 26–20. Drive: 10 plays, 75 yards, 5:46.
- MIZ – Robert Meyer 40-yard field goal, 1:34. Tigers 29–20. Drive: 10 plays, 57 yards, 3:29.

Statistics	SC	MIZ
First downs	15	29
Plays–yards	50–293	75–456
Rushes–yards	22–(-9)	48–285
Passing yards	302	171
Passing: comp–att–int	18–28–0	16–27–1
Turnovers	0	1
Time of possession	24:43	35:17

Team	Category	Player	Statistics
South Carolina	Passing	LaNorris Sellers	18/28, 302 yards, 2 TD
South Carolina	Rushing	Oscar Adaway III	3 carries, 7 yards
South Carolina	Receiving	Vandrevius Jacobs	7 receptions, 128 yards, TD
Missouri	Passing	Beau Pribula	16/27, 171 yards, TD, INT
Missouri	Rushing	Ahmad Hardy	22 carries, 138 yards, TD
Missouri	Receiving	Marquis Johnson	7 receptions, 80 yards

=== vs Kentucky ===
Kentucky Wildcats (2–1) at South Carolina Gamecocks (2–2) – Game summary

Quarter	1	2	3	4	Total
Wildcats	10	0	3	0	13
Gamecocks	7	21	0	7	35

at Williams–Brice Stadium • Columbia, South Carolina

- Date: September 27
- Game time: 7:45 p.m.
- Game weather: Cloudy • Temperature: 75 °F (24 °C) • Wind: W at 1 mile per hour (1.6 km/h)
- Game attendance: 79,266
- Referee: Matt Loeffler
- TV announcers (SECN): Tom Hart (play-by-play), Jordan Rodgers (analyst), and Cole Cubelic (sideline)

Game information

First quarter

- (11:27) UK – Seth McGowan 20-yard run, Jacob Kauwe kick (Drive: 8 plays, 65 yards, 3:33; Kentucky 7–0)
- (5:48) SC – Rahsul Faison 12-yard run, William Joyce kick (Drive: 12 plays, 75 yards, 5:39; Tied 7–7)
- (0:58) UK – Jacob Kauwe 27-yard field goal (Drive: 9 plays, 76 yards, 4:48; Kentucky 10–7)

Second quarter

- (11:28) SC – Jatius Geer 41-yard fumble return, William Joyce kick (Drive: 0 plays, 0 yards, 2:37; South Carolina 14–10)
- (10:43) SC – Gerald Kilgore 45-yard interception return, William Joyce kick (Drive: 0 plays, 0 yards, 0:45; South Carolina 21–10)
- (1:07) SC – Rahsul Faison 6-yard run, William Joyce kick (Drive: 5 plays, 43 yards, 0:58; South Carolina 28–10)

Third quarter

- (0:34) UK – Jacob Kauwe 42-yard field goal (Drive: 7 plays, 15 yards, 3:30; South Carolina 28–13)

Fourth quarter

- (12:14) SC – Matt Fuller 1-yard run, William Joyce kick (Drive: 8 plays, 84 yards, 3:14; South Carolina 35–13)

Statistics	UK	SC
First downs	14	19
Plays–yards	60–232	63–341
Rushes–yards	41–108	48–178
Passing yards	124	163
Passing: comp–att–int	10–19–2	12–15–0
Turnovers	4	0
Time of possession	28:57	31:03

Team	Category	Player	Statistics
Kentucky	Passing	Cutter Boley	10/19, 124 yards, 2 INT
Kentucky	Rushing	Seth McGowan	17 carries, 112 yards, TD
Kentucky	Receiving	Willie Rodriguez	2 receptions, 66 yards
South Carolina	Passing	LaNorris Sellers	11/14, 153 yards
South Carolina	Rushing	LaNorris Sellers	14 carries, 81 yards
South Carolina	Receiving	Vandrevius Jacobs	5 receptions, 108 yards

=== at No. 11 LSU ===
South Carolina Gamecocks (3–2) at No. 11 LSU Tigers (4–1) – Game summary

Quarter	1	2	3	4	Total
Gamecocks	7	0	3	0	10
No. 11 Tigers	3	7	7	3	20

at Tiger Stadium • Baton Rouge, Louisiana

- Date: October 11
- Game time: 12:45 p.m.
- Game weather: Clear • Temperature: 77 °F (25 °C) • Wind: NE at 2 miles per hour (3.2 km/h)
- Game attendance: 101,921
- Referee: Steve Marlowe
- TV announcers (SECN): Tom Hart (play-by-play), Jordan Rodgers (analyst), and Cole Cubelic (sideline)

Game information

First quarter

- (11:53) LSU – Damian Ramos 28-yard field goal (Drive: 4 plays, 7 yards, 1:23; LSU 3–0)
- (0:25) SC – Matt Fuller 72-yard run, William Joyce kick (Drive: 3 plays, 80 yards, 1:26; South Carolina 7–3)

Second quarter

- (13:01) LSU – Trey'Dez Green 6-yard pass from Garrett Nussmeier, Damian Ramos kick (Drive: 6 plays, 72 yards, 2:19; LSU 10–7)
- (8:39) SC – William Joyce 47-yard field goal (Drive: 11 plays, 46 yards, 6:21; Tied 10–10)

Third quarter

- (6:38) LSU – Kyle Parker 43-yard pass from Garrett Nussmeier, Damian Ramos kick (Drive: 4 plays, 75 yards, 2:01; LSU 17–10)

Fourth quarter

- (1:47) LSU – Damian Ramos 22-yard field goal (Drive: 10 plays, 64 yards, 3:56; LSU 20–10)

Statistics	SC	LSU
First downs	20	22
Plays–yards	72–317	63–420
Rushes–yards	45–193	30–166
Passing yards	124	254
Passing: comp–att–int	15–27–1	20–33–2
Turnovers	2	3
Time of possession	31:45	28:15

Team	Category	Player	Statistics
South Carolina	Passing	LaNorris Sellers	15/27, 124 yards, INT
South Carolina	Rushing	Matt Fuller	7 carries, 83 yards, TD
South Carolina	Receiving	Nyck Harbor	2 receptions, 36 yards
LSU	Passing	Garrett Nussmeier	20/33, 254 yards, 2 TD, 2 INT
LSU	Rushing	Caden Durham	15 carries, 70 yards
LSU	Receiving	Trey'Dez Green	8 receptions, 119 yards, TD

=== vs No. 14 Oklahoma ===
No. 14 Oklahoma Sooners (5–1) at South Carolina Gamecocks (3–3) – Game summary

Quarter	1	2	3	4	Total
No. 14 Sooners	7	7	10	2	26
Gamecocks	0	7	0	0	7

at Williams–Brice Stadium • Columbia, South Carolina

- Date: October 18
- Game time: 12:45 p.m.
- Game weather: Sunny • Temperature: 89 °F
- Game attendance: 78,680
- Referee: Lee Hedrick
- TV announcers (SECN): Taylor Zarzour (play-by-play), Matt Stinchcomb (analyst), and Alyssa Lang (sideline)

Game information

First quarter

- OU – Tory Blaylock 18-yard run (Tate Sandell kick), 9:42. Sooners 7–0. Drive: 10 plays, 75 yards, 5:18.

Second quarter

- OU – Xavier Robinson 10-yard run (Tate Sandell kick), 9:21. Sooners 14–0. Drive: 13 plays, 92 yards, 5:17.
- SC – Nyck Harbor 2-yard pass from LaNorris Sellers (William Joyce kick), 1:43. Sooners 14–7. Drive: 11 plays, 47 yards, 4:06.

Third quarter

- OU – Tate Sandell 55-yard field goal, 6:01. Sooners 17–7. Drive: 4 plays, 16 yards, 2:06.
- OU – Isaiah Sategna III 20-yard pass from John Mateer (Tate Sandell kick), 2:06. Sooners 24–7. Drive: 5 plays, 49 yards, 2:10.

Fourth quarter

- OU – Marcus Strong Safety, 4:22. Sooners 26–7.

Statistics	OU	SC
First downs	20	15
Plays–yards	67–319	67–224
Rushes–yards	40–171	34–54
Passing yards	148	170
Passing: comp–att–int	19–27–0	21–33–2
Turnovers	0	2
Time of possession	33:38	26:22

Team	Category	Player	Statistics
Oklahoma	Passing	John Mateer	18/26, 150 yards, TD
Oklahoma	Rushing	Tory Blaylock	19 carries, 101 yards, TD
Oklahoma	Receiving	Isaiah Sategna III	7 receptions, 73 yards, TD
South Carolina	Passing	LaNorris Sellers	17/25, 124 yards, TD
South Carolina	Rushing	Rahsul Faison	10 carries, 50 yards
South Carolina	Receiving	Jayden Sellers	6 receptions, 57 yards

=== vs No. 4 Alabama ===
No. 4 Alabama Crimson Tide (6–1) at South Carolina Gamecocks (3–4) – Game summary

Quarter	1	2	3	4	Total
No. 4 Crimson Tide	7	7	0	15	29
Gamecocks	3	3	9	7	22

at Williams–Brice Stadium • Columbia, South Carolina

- Date: October 25
- Game time: 2:30 p.m.
- Game weather: Sunny • Temperature: 69 °F (21 °C) • Wind: NE at 5 miles per hour (8.0 km/h)
- Game attendance: 79,537
- Referee: Daniel Gautreaux
- TV announcers (ABC): Joe Tessitore (play-by-play), Jesse Palmer (analyst), and Katie George (sideline)

Game information

First quarter

- SC - William Joyce 24-yard field goal, 7:32. Gamecocks 3-0. Drive: 15 plays, 74 yards, 7:28.
- ALA - DaShawn Jones 18-yard interception return (Conor Talty kick), 5:17. Crimson Tide 7-3. Drive: 1 play, 0 yards, 0:10.

Second quarter

- SC - William Joyce 34-yard field goal, 4:23. Crimson Tide 7-6. Drive: 14 plays, 42 yards, 6:58.
- ALA - Josh Cuevas 3-yard pass from Ty Simpson (Conor Talty kick), 1:45. Crimson Tide 14-6. Drive: 9 plays, 81 yards, 2:38.

Third quarter

- SC - Nyck Harbor 54-yard pass from LaNorris Sellers (Two-Point Pass Conversion Failed), 10:59. Crimson Tide 14-12. Drive: 1 play, 54 yards, 0:09.
- SC - William Joyce 47-yard field goal, 1:38. Gamecocks 15-14. Drive: 11 plays, 46 yards, 4:53.

Fourth quarter

- SC - LaNorris Sellers 10-yard run (William Joyce kick), 10:00. Gamecocks 22-14. Drive: 6 plays, 30 yards, 3:28.
- ALA - Germie Bernard 4-yard pass from Ty Simpson (Ty Simpson pass to Josh Cuevas for Two-Point Conversation), 2:16. Tied 22-22. Drive: 14 plays, 79 yards, 7:44.
- ALA - Germie Bernard 25-yard run (Conor Talty kick), 0:34. Crimson Tide 29-22. Drive: 5 plays, 38 yards, 1:05.

Statistics	ALA	SC
First downs	17	18
Plays–yards	70–333	66–325
Rushes–yards	37–111	23–72
Passing yards	253	222
Passing: comp–att–int	18–33–1	24–43–0
Turnovers	2	2
Time of possession	27:22	32:38

Team	Category	Player	Statistics
Alabama	Passing	Ty Simpson	24/43, 253 yards, 2 TD
Alabama	Rushing	Jam Miller	10 carries, 26 yards
Alabama	Receiving	Daniel Hill	4 receptions, 76 yards
South Carolina	Passing	LaNorris Sellers	18/32, 222 yards, TD, INT
South Carolina	Rushing	LaNorris Sellers	18 carries, 67 yards, TD
South Carolina	Receiving	Nyck Harbor	1 reception, 54 yards, TD

=== at No. 7 Ole Miss ===
South Carolina Gamecocks (3–5) at No. 7 Ole Miss Rebels (7–1) – Game summary

Quarter	1	2	3	4	Total
Gamecocks	7	0	7	0	14
No. 7 Rebels	10	7	3	10	30

at Vaught–Hemingway Stadium • Oxford, Mississippi

- Date: November 1
- Game time: 6:00 p.m.
- Game weather: Cloudy • Temperature: 58 °F (14 °C) • Wind: W at 3 miles per hour (4.8 km/h)
- Game attendance: 67,491
- Referee: Kyle Olson
- TV announcers (ESPN): Bob Wischusen (play-by-play), Louis Riddick (analyst), and Kris Budden (sideline reporter)

Game information

First quarter

- SC – LaNorris Sellers 1-yard run (William Joyce kick), 9:43. Gamecocks 7–0. Drive: 4 plays, 16 yards, 1:55.
- MISS – Lucas Carneiro 21-yard field goal, 3:58. Gamecocks 7–3. Drive: 11 plays, 51 yards, 5:06.
- MISS – Dae'Quan Wright 8-yard pass from Trinidad Chambliss (Lucas Carneiro kick), 1:28. Rebels 10–7. Drive: 2 plays, 51 yards, 0:35.

Second quarter

- MISS – Trinidad Chambliss 15-yard run (Lucas Carneiro kick), 6:56. Rebels 17–7. Drive: 10 plays, 89 yards, 5:11.

Third quarter

- SC – Nyck Harbor 47-yard pass from LaNorris Sellers (William Joyce kick), 11:30. Rebels 17–14. Drive: 5 plays, 75 yards, 3:30.
- MISS – Lucas Carneiro 27-yard field goal, 5:46. Rebels 20–14. Drive: 4 plays, 3 yards, 2:10.

Fourth quarter

- MISS – Lucas Carneiro 34-yard field goal, 11:54. Rebels 23–14. Drive: 6 plays, 38 yards, 2:59.
- MISS – Kewan Lacy 54-yard run (Lucas Carneiro kick), 5:44. Rebels 30–14. Drive: 1 play, 54 yards, 0:12.

Statistics	SC	MISS
First downs	15	19
Plays–yards	62–230	66–417
Rushes–yards	32–50	45–258
Passing yards	180	159
Passing: comp–att–int	16–30–2	12–21–1
Turnovers	3	2
Time of possession	29:14	30:46

Team	Category	Player	Statistics
South Carolina	Passing	LaNorris Sellers	16/30, 180 yards, TD, INT
South Carolina	Rushing	Rahsul Faison	12 carries, 52 yards
South Carolina	Receiving	Nyck Harbor	3 receptions, 69 yards, TD
Ole Miss	Passing	Trinidad Chambliss	12/21, 159 yards, TD, INT
Ole Miss	Rushing	Kewan Lacy	24 carries, 167 yards, TD
Ole Miss	Receiving	Deuce Alexander	2 receptions, 52 yards

=== at No. 3 Texas A&M ===
This game featured a surprising lead by the underdog Gamecocks, punctuated by the 2025 Texas A&M–South Carolina football sideline incident where a police officer harassed South Carolina players. However, the Gamecocks fell apart in the second half and lost the game in dramatic fashion.

South Carolina Gamecocks (3–6) at No. 3 Texas A&M Aggies (9–0) – Game summary

Quarter	1	2	3	4	Total
Gamecocks	17	13	0	0	30
No. 3 Aggies	3	0	21	7	31

at Kyle Field • College Station, Texas

- Date: November 15
- Game time: 12:00 p.m.
- Game weather: Cloudy, 77°, Wind W 9mph
- Game attendance: 108,582
- Referee: David Smith
- TV announcers (ESPN): Dave Pasch (play-by-play), Dusty Dvoracek (analyst), and Taylor McGregor (sideline reporter)

Game information

First quarter

- SC – William Joyce 36-yard field goal, 11:10. Gamecocks 3–0. Drive: 10 plays, 57 yards, 3:50.
- TA&M – Randy Bond 40-yard field goal, 7:55. Tied 3–3. Drive: 7 plays, 52 yards, 3:15.
- SC – Vandrevius Jacobs 50-yard pass from LaNorris Sellers (William Joyce kick), 5:28. Gamecocks 10–3. Drive: 6 plays, 75 yards, 2:26.
- SC – Nick Barrett 17-yard fumble return (William Joyce kick), 0:00. Gamecocks 17–3.

Second quarter

- SC – William Joyce 41-yard field goal, 9:32. Gamecocks 20–3. Drive: 8 plays, 66 yards, 4:05.
- SC – Nyck Harbor 80-yard pass from LaNorris Sellers (Mason Love kick), 0:53. Gamecocks 27–3. Drive: 1 play, 80 yards, 0:13.
- SC – William Joyce 35-yard field goal, 0:02. Gamecocks 30–3. Drive: 3 plays, 6 yards, 0:31.

Third quarter

- TA&M – Izaiah Williams 27-yard pass from Marcel Reed (Randy Bond kick), 11:26. Gamecocks 30–10. Drive: 8 plays, 35 yards, 3:28.
- TA&M – Ashton Bethel-Roman 39-yard pass from Marcel Reed (Randy Bond kick), 4:18. Gamecocks 30–17. Drive: 7 plays, 70 yards, 2:55.
- TA&M – Nate Boerkircher 14-yard pass from Marcel Reed (Randy Bond kick), 2:04. Gamecocks 30–24. Drive: 2 plays, 80 yards, 0:38.

Fourth quarter

- TA&M – EJ Smith 4-yard run (Randy Bond kick), 10:47. Aggies 31–30. Drive: 10 plays, 98 yards, 4:13.

Statistics	SC	TA&M
First downs	15	23
Plays–yards	64–388	68–503
Rushes–yards	33–121	29–64
Passing yards	267	439
Passing: comp–att–int	16–31–1	22–39–2
Turnovers	1	4
Time of possession	29:44	30:16

Team	Category	Player	Statistics
South Carolina	Passing	LaNorris Sellers	15/30, 246 yards, TD, INT
South Carolina	Rushing	Jawarn Howell	3 carries, 30 yards
South Carolina	Receiving	Nyck Harbor	3 receptions, 102 yards, TD
Texas A&M	Passing	Marcel Reed	22/39, 439 yards, 3 TD, 2 INT
Texas A&M	Rushing	Rueben Owens II	8 carries, 28 yards
Texas A&M	Receiving	KC Concepcion	7 receptions, 158 yards

=== vs Coastal Carolina ===
Coastal Carolina Chanticleers (6-4) at South Carolina Gamecocks (3-7) – Game summary

Quarter	1	2	3	4	Total
Chanticleers	0	0	0	7	7
Gamecocks	20	17	7	7	51

at Williams–Brice Stadium • Columbia, South Carolina

- Date: November 22
- Game time: 4:15 p.m. EST
- Game weather:
- Game attendance: 78,452
- Referee: Matt Loeffler
- TV announcers (SECN): Dave Neal (play-by-play), Fozzy Whittaker (analyst) and Morgan Uber (sideline)

Game information

First Quarter

- (14:46) SC – Jayden Sellers 75-yard pass from LaNorris Sellers, William Joyce kick (Drive: 1 play, 75 yards, 0:14; South Carolina 7–0)
- (8:50) SC – LaNorris Sellers 2-yard run, two-point conversion run attempt failed (Drive: 6 plays, 74 yards, 3:34; South Carolina 14–0)
- (7:27) SC – Brady Hunt 1-yard run, William Joyce kick (Drive: 3 plays, 29 yards, 1:12; South Carolina 21–0)

Second Quarter

- (9:14) SC – Donovan Murph 3-yard pass from LaNorris Sellers, William Joyce kick (Drive: 9 plays, 77 yards, 4:31; South Carolina 28–0)
- (5:05) SC – LaNorris Sellers 5-yard run, William Joyce kick (Drive: 5 plays, 80 yards, 1:54; South Carolina 34–0)
- (0:01) SC – William Joyce 47-yard field goal (Drive: 3 plays, 32 yards, 0:24; South Carolina 37–0)

Third Quarter

- (1:44) SC – Brady Hunt 1-yard run, William Joyce kick (Drive: 13 plays, 83 yards, 6:33; South Carolina 44–0)

Fourth Quarter

- (9:37) CCU – Jameson Tucker 17-yard punt return, Kian Afrookhteh kick (Drive: 3 plays, 4 yards, 1:51; South Carolina 44–7)
- (1:56) SC – Bradley Dunn 1-yard run, William Joyce kick (Drive: 15 plays, 85 yards, 7:36; South Carolina 51–7)

Statistics	CCU	SC
First downs	13	25
Plays–yards	65–220	69–579
Rushes–yards	29–46	39–264
Passing yards	174	315
Passing: comp–att–int	27–36–0	23–30–0
Turnovers	1	0
Time of possession	26:10	33:50

Team	Category	Player	Statistics
Coastal Carolina	Passing	Tad Hudson	27/36, 174 yards
Coastal Carolina	Rushing	Javin Simpkins	8 carries, 26 yards
Coastal Carolina	Receiving	Cameron Wright	4 receptions, 33 yards
South Carolina	Passing	LaNorris Sellers	16/20, 274 yards, 2 TD
South Carolina	Rushing	LaNorris Sellers	8 carries, 82 yards, 2 TD
South Carolina	Receiving	Jayden Sellers	4 receptions, 127 yards, TD

=== vs Clemson (Palmetto Bowl) ===
Clemson Tigers (6-5) at South Carolina Gamecocks (4-7) – Game summary

Quarter	1	2	3	4	Total
Tigers	0	17	3	8	28
Gamecocks	0	14	0	0	14

at Williams–Brice Stadium • Columbia, South Carolina

- Date: November 29
- Game time: 12:00 p.m.
- Game weather: 46 °F (8 °C) • Wind: NE @ 6 mph • Weather: Sunny
- Game attendance: 79,827
- Referee: Jerry Magallanes
- TV announcers (SECN): Taylor Zarzour (play-by-play), Matt Stinchcomb (analyst) and Alyssa Lang (sideline reporter)

Game information

First quarter

- No scoring plays.

Second quarter

- CLEM – Adam Randall 10-yard run (Nolan Hauser kick), 12:37. Tigers 7–0. Drive: 7 plays, 78 yards, 3:37.
- SC – Nyck Harbor 53-yard pass from LaNorris Sellers (William Joyce kick), 11:14. Tied 7–7. Drive: 3 plays, 75 yards, 1:23.
- CLEM – Cade Klubnik 3-yard run (Nolan Hauser kick), 5:48. Tigers 14–7. Drive: 11 plays, 85 yards, 5:20.
- SC – Vandrevius Jacobs 74-yard pass from LaNorris Sellers (William Joyce kick), 5:29. Tied 14–14. Drive: 1 play, 74 yards, 0:13.
- CLEM – Nolan Hauser 32-yard field goal, 0:56. Tigers 17–14. Drive: 12 plays, 61 yards, 4:33.

Third quarter

- CLEM – Nolan Hauser 42-yard field goal, 8:32. Tigers 20–14. Drive: 12 plays, 56 yards, 5:33.

Fourth quarter

- CLEM – Ricardo Jones 12-yard interception return (Cade Klubnik–Adam Randall pass), 3:20. Tigers 28–14.

Statistics	CLEM	SC
First downs	25	17
Plays–yards	79–415	61–422
Rushes–yards	40–147	19–41
Passing yards	268	381
Passing: comp–att–int	24–39–1	23–42–2
Turnovers	1	4
Time of possession	38:44	21:16

Team	Category	Player	Statistics
Clemson	Passing	Cade Klubnik	24/39, 268 yards, INT
Clemson	Rushing	Adam Randall	24 carries, 102 yards, TD
Clemson	Receiving	T.J. Moore	6 receptions, 101 yards
South Carolina	Passing	LaNorris Sellers	23/42, 381 yards, 2 TD, 2 INT
South Carolina	Rushing	Rahsul Fasion	5 carries, 37 yards
South Carolina	Receiving	Vandrevius Jacobs	7 receptions, 141 yards, TD
