= Lakewood High School =

Lakewood High School may refer to:

- Lakewood High School (California) — Lakewood, California
- Lakewood High School (Colorado) — Lakewood, Colorado
- Lakewood High School (Florida) — St. Petersburg, Florida
- Lakewood High School (Lake Odessa, Michigan) — Lake Odessa, Michigan
- Lakewood High School (New Jersey) — Lakewood, New Jersey
- Lakewood High School (North Carolina) — Salemburg, North Carolina
- Lakewood High School (Hebron, Ohio) — Hebron, Ohio
- Lakewood High School (Lakewood, Ohio) — Lakewood, Ohio
- Lakewood High School (Sumter, South Carolina) — Sumter, South Carolina
- Lakewood High School (Washington) — North Lakewood, Washington
