= LaNorris Sellers =

American football player (born 2005)

- Sellers with the South Carolina Gamecocks in 2026

No. 16 – South Carolina Gamecocks
- Position: Quarterback
- Class: (redshirt) Junior

Personal information
- Born: June 23, 2005 (age 21); Florence, South Carolina, U.S.
- Listed height: 6 ft 3 in (1.91 m)
- Listed weight: 240 lb (109 kg)

Career information
- High school: South Florence
- College: South Carolina (2023–present)

Awards and highlights
- SEC Freshman of the Year (2024); Third-team All-SEC (2024); Freshman All-American (2024); SEC All-Freshman Team (2024)

LaNorris Sellers (born June 23, 2005) is an American college football quarterback for the South Carolina Gamecocks.

== Early life ==
Sellers was born and raised in Florence, South Carolina. He attended South Florence High School in Florence for all four years of his high school career. As a senior Sellers took the Bruins to the South Carolina 4A State Championship where they beat the Northwestern Trojans 57–30.

Sellers was named the Florence Morning News Prep Football Player of the Year after he passed for 2,948 yards with 45 touchdowns and rushed for 1,338 yards and 17 touchdowns. Sellers was named the offensive MVP of the 2022 Shrine Bowl after throwing for 121 yards and a touchdown.

At the conclusion of his high school career Sellers was ranked No. 4 prospect in the state, the 16th-best quarterback in the country and No. 246 overall in the 247Sports Composite. He originally committed to play college football at Virginia and then Syracuse before finally signing with South Carolina.

== College career ==
Sellers with the South Carolina Gamecocks in 2025

Sellers began his true freshman season as the backup quarterback to Spencer Rattler. In Week 2 against Furman, he made his collegiate debut, completing all four of his passes for 86 yards and two touchdowns in the victory. In Week 10 against Vanderbilt, he recorded a 36-yard rushing touchdown on his only attempt in the victory. On the season, Sellers appeared in three games while preserving his redshirt, completing all four of his passing attempts for 86 yards and two touchdowns while rushing for 51 yards and one touchdown.

Sellers was named the starting quarterback to begin the 2024 season over Auburn transfer Robby Ashford. In his first career start against Old Dominion, he completed 10 of 23 passes for 114 yards while adding 68 rushing yards and a touchdown, including a go-ahead rushing touchdown in the fourth quarter to secure a 23–19 victory. During the season, he led the Gamecocks to a 9–3 record and a No. 15 ranking, highlighted by ranked victories over Texas A&M, Missouri, and Clemson. Against Missouri, Sellers threw for a season-high 353 yards and five touchdowns, including the game-winning 15-yard touchdown pass to Raheim Sanders with 15 seconds remaining. Against Clemson, he scored the go-ahead 20-yard rushing touchdown with less than two minutes remaining to secure a 17–14 Palmetto Bowl victory. In the Citrus Bowl against Illinois, he completed 24 of 34 passes for 260 yards and one touchdown in the loss. Sellers appeared in 12 games and made 12 starts, missing one game due to injury. He completed 196 of 299 passes for 2,534 yards, 18 touchdowns, and seven interceptions while rushing for 674 yards and seven touchdowns. For his performance, he was named the SEC Freshman of the Year, earned third-team All-SEC honors, was selected to the SEC All-Freshman Team, and was recognized as a freshman All-American.

Sellers returned as the starting quarterback for the 2025 season. After leading the Gamecocks to non-conference victories over Virginia Tech and South Carolina State, South Carolina reached a No. 10 ranking before losing seven of its eight conference games and splitting its final two non-conference games. The Gamecocks finished the season with a 4–8 record. Sellers appeared in and started all 12 games, completing 178 of 293 passes for 2,437 yards, 13 touchdowns, and eight interceptions while rushing for 270 yards and five touchdowns.

=== Statistics ===
Year	Team	Games			Passing								Rushing			
Year	Team	GP	GS	Record	Cmp	Att	Pct	Yds	Y/A	TD	Int	Rtg	Att	Yds	Avg	TD
2023	South Carolina	3	0	—	4	4	100.0	86	21.5	2	0	445.6	5	51	10.2	1
2024	South Carolina	12	12	9–3	196	299	65.6	2,534	8.5	18	7	151.9	166	674	4.1	7
2025	South Carolina	12	12	4–8	178	293	60.8	2,437	8.3	13	8	139.8	149	270	1.8	5
2026	South Carolina	9	9	6–3	172	274	62.8	2,100	7.7	17	7	142.8	104	637	6.1	7
Career		36	33	18–15	550	870	63.2	7,157	8.2	50	22	146.2	424	1,632	3.8	20

== Personal life ==
Sellers is the brother of current Gamecock wide receiver Jayden Sellers.
