= Matt Fuller (American football) =

American football player

No. 28 – South Carolina Gamecocks
- Position: Running back
- Class: Junior

Personal information
- Listed height: 5 ft 11 in (1.80 m)
- Listed weight: 221 lb (100 kg)

Career information
- High school: Wayne County (Jesup, Georgia)
- College: South Carolina (2024–present)
- Stats at ESPN

Matthew K. Fuller is an American college football running back for the South Carolina Gamecocks.

== Early life ==
Fuller attended Wayne County High School in Jesup, Georgia. During his final two seasons, he rushed for 3,843 yards and 49 touchdowns and recorded 135 tackles on defense. As a senior, Fuller rushed for 2,086 yards and 27 touchdowns on 256 carries. A three-star recruit, he committed to the University of South Carolina to play college football.

== College career ==
As a freshman in 2024, Fuller appeared in limited action, recording eight carries for 25 yards. As a sophomore in 2025, Fuller rushed for 260 yards and two touchdowns. Entering the 2026 season, Fuller competed for South Carolina's starting running back position.

=== Statistics ===
College statistics
Season	Team	Games	Rushing				Receiving			
Season	Team	GP	Att	Yards	Avg	TD	Rec	Yards	Avg	TD
2024	South Carolina	2	8	25	3.1	0	–	–	–	–
2025	South Carolina	10	72	260	3.6	2	6	32	5.3	0
2026	South Carolina	2	21	199	9.5	2	1	8	8.0	0
Career		14	101	484	4.8	4	7	40	5.7	0
