= Tyreek Johnson =

American gridiron football player (born 1999)

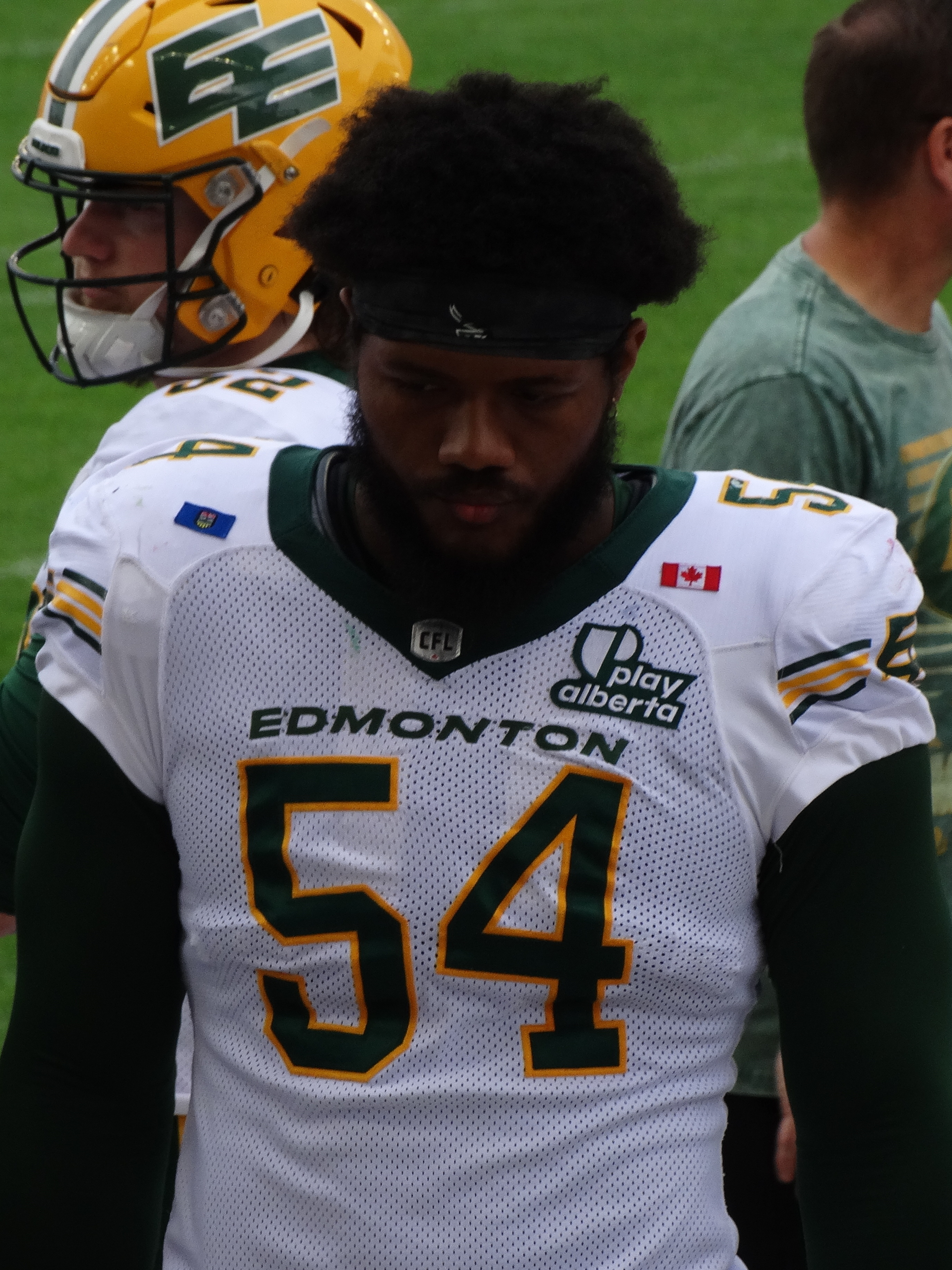
- Johnson with the Edmonton Elks in 2025

No. 54
- Position: Defensive lineman

Personal information
- Born: April 26, 1999 (age 27); Sumter, South Carolina, U.S.
- Listed height: 6 ft 4 in (1.93 m)
- Listed weight: 283 lb (128 kg)

Career information
- High school: Lakewood (Sumter, South Carolina)
- College: South Carolina (2018–2023)
- NFL draft: 2024: undrafted

Career history
- New York Jets (2024)*; Edmonton Elks (2025)
- * Offseason or practice squad member only
- Stats at CFL.ca

Tyreek Donte Johnson (born April 26, 1999) is an American former professional football defensive lineman. He previously played college football for the South Carolina Gamecocks. Johnson also had a stint with the New York Jets of the National Football League (NFL).

== College career ==
Tyreek Johnson played college football for the South Carolina Gamecocks from 2018 to 2023. He missed his entire first year at South Carolina after tearing his ACL in spring practice. In 2019, Johnson played in his first game against Charleston Southern, recording two tackles. He then suffered another injury that season, a subluxed kneecap, undergo off-season surgery and miss the entire 2020 season. Johnson played in 26 games and started in four for the Gamecocks, finishing with 29 tackles, including 5.5 tackles for loss, 2.5 sacks and one fumble recovery.

== Professional career ==
Pre-draft measurables
Height	Weight	Arm length	Hand span	40-yard dash	10-yard split	20-yard split	20-yard shuttle	Three-cone drill	Vertical jump	Broad jump	Bench press
6 ft 4 in (1.93 m)	283 lb (128 kg)	32 3/4 in (0.83 m)	10 1/8 in (0.26 m)	4.70 s	1.56 s	2.72 s	4.49 s	7.65 s	35 in (0.89 m)	10 ft 4 in (3.15 m)	33 reps
All values from Pro Day

=== New York Jets ===
After not being selected in the 2024 NFL draft, Johnson signed with the New York Jets as an undrafted free agent. He was waived by the team on June 6, 2024.

=== Edmonton Elks ===
On July 2, 2025, It was announced that the Edmonton Elks of the CFL signed Johnson to the practice roster. He made his professional debut against Saskatchewan Roughriders on July 25, recording one tackle.

On April 30, 2026, the Elks placed Johnson on the retired list.
