= Eastern Wayne High School =

American public school in North Carolina

Location
- 1135 E New Hope Rd; Goldsboro, North Carolina 27534; United States; 35°22′39″N 77°52′50″W

Information
- School type: Public
- Founded: 1969 (57 years ago)
- School district: Wayne County Public Schools
- CEEB code: 341520
- Principal: John Eric Waters
- Teaching staff: 49.71 (on an FTE basis)
- Grades: 9–12
- Enrollment: 806 (2023–2024)
- Student to teacher ratio: 16.21
- Colors: Navy and gold
- Team name: Warriors
- Website: www.waynecountyschools.org/o/easternwaynehigh

Eastern Wayne High School (EWHS) is a public high school located in Goldsboro, Wayne County, North Carolina, United States. It opened in 1969.

The school received a Silver Medal designation in U.S. News & World Report's "America’s Best High Schools" rankings, and had a graduation rate of 91.1%. In 2010, it was awarded the National Award for School Lunch for having the best high school lunch in America.

== Athletics ==
Eastern Wayne is a member of the North Carolina High School Athletic Association (NCHSAA). The school mascot is the Warrior, and its colors are navy blue and gold.

Sports offered at Eastern Wayne include cross country, football, golf, soccer, tennis, women's volleyball, basketball, swimming, wrestling, baseball, softball, track & field, and cheerleading.

== Notable alumni ==
- Nick Barrett, NFL defensive tackle
- Jimmy Graham, NFL tight end and 5x Pro Bowl selection
- Manny Lawson, NFL linebacker from 2006 to 2015
- Sam Narron, former MLB pitcher
