= Vandrevius Jacobs =

American football player (born 2004)

No. 8 – Miami Hurricanes
- Position: Wide receiver
- Class: (redshirt) Junior

Personal information
- Born: October 19, 2004 (age 22)
- Listed height: 6 ft 0 in (1.83 m)
- Listed weight: 182 lb (83 kg)

Career information
- High school: Vero Beach (Vero Beach, Florida)
- College: Florida State (2023); South Carolina (2024–2025); Miami (FL) (2026–present)
- Stats at ESPN

Vandrevius Jacobs (born October 19, 2004) is an American college football wide receiver for the Miami Hurricanes. He previously played for the Florida State Seminoles and South Carolina Gamecocks.

== Early life ==
Jacobs attended Vero Beach High School in Vero Beach, Florida. As a junior, he totaled 49 receptions for 809 yards and 10 touchdowns. He finished his senior year recording 100 catches for 1,511 yards and 21 touchdowns. Jacobs committed to play college football at Florida State University over offers from Arkansas, Georgia Tech, Indiana, and Miami.

== College career ==
Jacobs played sparingly as a freshman, tallying three receptions for 60 yards and a touchdown. Following the conclusion of the season, he entered the transfer portal. In April 2024, Jacob transferred to the University of South Carolina to play for the South Carolina Gamecocks. In his first season with the Gamecocks, he accumulated 12 catches for 181 yards. Jacob's playing time increased the following season, becoming the team's leading receiver.

=== Statistics ===
Year	Team	Games		Receiving			
Year	Team	GP	GS	Rec	Yds	Avg	TD
2023	Florida State	5	0	3	60	20.0	1
2024	South Carolina	9	4	12	181	15.1	0
2025	South Carolina	12	6	32	548	17.1	4
2026	Miami	2	0	2	38	19.0	1
Career		28	10	49	827	16.9	6
