= Jayden Sellers =

American football player (born 2007)

No. 17 – South Carolina Gamecocks
- Position: Wide receiver
- Class: Freshman

Personal information
- Born: March 20, 2007 (age 19)
- Listed height: 5 ft 11 in (1.80 m)
- Listed weight: 175 lb (79 kg)

Career information
- High school: South Florence (Florence, South Carolina)
- College: South Carolina (2025–present)
- Stats at ESPN

Jayden Sellers (born March 20, 2007) is an American football wide receiver for the South Carolina Gamecocks.

== Early life ==
Sellers attended South Florence High School located in Florence, South Carolina. During his senior season, he recorded 59 catches for 1,016 yards and 14 touchdowns, while also adding 485 yards and 10 scores on the ground. Coming out of high school, Sellers was rated as a three star recruit, the 6th overall prospect in the State of South Carolina, and the 65th best receiver in the class of 2025, where he committed to play college football for the South Carolina Gamecocks, over offers from other schools such as Cincinnati, Syracuse, and Virginia Tech.

== College career ==
Heading into his true freshman season in 2025, he competed for playing time. In week eight of the 2025 season, Sellers totaled six receptions for 57 yards in a loss against Oklahoma. In week nine, he got his first career start where he recorded three receptions for 38 yards in a loss versus Alabama. In week twelve, Sellers hauled in four passes for 48 yards, while also adding 21 yards on four carries in a 31-30 loss to Texas A&M.

== Personal life ==
Sellers is the brother of current Gamecock quarterback LaNorris Sellers.
