= Lakewood High School (Sumter, South Carolina) =

Coordinates: 33.8532°N 80.3561°W

Location
- 350 Old Manning Road; Sumter, South Carolina; United States

Information
- Type: Public high school
- Oversight: Sumter School District
- Principal: Maggie Wright
- Teaching staff: 47.00 (FTE)
- Grades: 9–12
- Enrollment: 1,016 (2023-2024)
- Student to teacher ratio: 21.62
- Campus: Rural
- Colors: Kelly green, white, and purple
- Mascot: Gators
- Rival: Sumter High School
- Accreditation: South Carolina Department of Education and Southern Association of Colleges and Schools
- Newspaper: Expressions
- Yearbook: "Odyssey"
- Phone: (803) 506-2700
- Website: lhs.sumterschools.net

Lakewood High School is a co-educational four-year public high school in Sumter, South Carolina, serving grades 9 through 12. Lakewood is one of only three public high schools in the Sumter School District and enrolls between 1,100 and 1,300 students each year from the southern half of Sumter County. The mascot of Lakewood High School is the Gator, chosen for Alligator Branch, a nearby stream.

== History ==
Lakewood High School, along with Crestwood High School, was built in 1996 as the result of a $28.5 million bond referendum passed by the voters of Sumter County to build two high schools in Sumter District 2. Lakewood High is named after Lakewood Links, a nearby golf course community in Lakewood, South Carolina. The school was dedicated on August 15, 1996.

The first students of Lakewood High School were former students of Furman High School and Mayewood High School, both of which were subsequently converted into middle schools. The school colors are kelly green, white, and purple. Purple was chosen as an accent color to represent unity among Sumter District 2 schools.

On July 1, 2011, Sumter School District 2 and Sumter School District 17 consolidated forming Sumter School District.

Lakewood's feeder school is Furman Middle School.

== Sports ==
Lakewood High School's mascot is the Gator and the school's sports teams are referred to as the "Lakewood Gators". The school offers cross country, football, golf, volleyball, softball, basketball, baseball, and wrestling.

The sports rivalry between the Sumter High Gamecocks and Lakewood Gators was memorialized in country singer Lee Brice's song,"Sumter County Friday Night".

== Notable alumni ==
- Jeremy Bryan, professional boxer
- Brandon Cisse, college football cornerback
- Tyreek Johnson, professional football player
