= Brandon Cisse =

American football player (born 2005)

No. 2 – Green Bay Packers
- Position: Cornerback
- Roster status: Active

Personal information
- Born: July 3, 2005 (age 21); Sumter, South Carolina, U.S.
- Listed height: 6 ft 0 in (1.83 m)
- Listed weight: 189 lb (86 kg)

Career information
- High school: Lakewood (Sumter)
- College: NC State (2023–2024); South Carolina (2025)
- NFL draft: 2026: 2nd round, 52nd overall pick

Career history
- Green Bay Packers (2026–present)

Career NFL statistics as of Week 10, 2026
- Total tackles: 38
- Sacks: 1.5
- Pass deflections: 9
- Interceptions: 1
- Stats at Pro Football Reference

Brandon Cisse (/siːseɪ/ SEE-say; born July 3, 2005) is an American professional football cornerback for the Green Bay Packers of the National Football League (NFL). He played college football for the NC State Wolfpack and South Carolina Gamecocks and was selected by the Packers in the second round of the 2026 NFL draft.

== Early life ==
Cisse attended Lakewood High School in Sumter, South Carolina, where he played both cornerback and wide receiver. As a senior, he had 37 tackles and one interception on defense and 42 receptions for 764 yards and eight touchdowns on offense. He committed to NC State University to play college football.

== College career ==
Cisse played at NC State in 2023 and 2024. As a freshman he played in all 13 games and recorded 10 tackles and as a sophomore started all nine games he played in and had 28 tackles and one interception.

After the 2024 season, Cisse entered the transfer portal and transferred to the University of South Carolina. He opened his first year at South Carolina in 2025 as a starter. In 12 appearances for the team, Cisse recorded one interception, five pass deflections, one forced fumble, and 27 combined tackles. On December 11, 2025, Cisse declared for the 2026 NFL draft.

== Professional career ==
Pre-draft measurables
Height	Weight	Arm length	Hand span	Wingspan	40-yard dash	10-yard split	20-yard split	20-yard shuttle	Vertical jump	Broad jump	Bench press
5 ft 11 3/4 in (1.82 m)	189 lb (86 kg)	30 3/4 in (0.78 m)	8 1/2 in (0.22 m)	6 ft 3 7/8 in (1.93 m)	4.41 s	1.53 s	2.60 s	4.33 s	41.0 in (1.04 m)	10 ft 11 in (3.33 m)	15 reps
All values from NFL Combine/Pro Day

The Green Bay Packers selected Cisse with the 52nd overall pick in the second round of the 2026 NFL draft. He was signed on May 14, 2026.

Cisse became the starting cornerback for the Packers entering the first week of the 2026 season. Cisse recorded five combined tackles and a half-sack on Geno Smith in the 20–17 overtime victory against the New York Jets. In the month of October, Cisse's impact became noteworthy. He recorded his first career full sack on Tyson Bagent in the 31–7 win over the Chicago Bears. The next week, against the Dallas Cowboys, he recorded his first career interception off Dak Prescott in the 23–13 win. He also recorded multiple pass breakups in three consecutive games, which he became the first Packers since Jaire Alexander in 2019. For his statistics in the month of October, which included 21 tackles, two tackles for loss, a sack, an interception, and seven passes defensed, he was named Defensive Rookie of the Month by the NFL.
