= Vicari Swain =

American football player (born 2004)

No. 4 – South Carolina Gamecocks
- Position: Cornerback / return specialist
- Class: Redshirt Junior

Personal information
- Born: September 12, 2004 (age 22)
- Listed height: 6 ft 0 in (1.83 m)
- Listed weight: 193 lb (88 kg)

Career information
- High school: Central (Carrollton, Georgia)
- College: South Carolina (2023–present)

Awards and highlights
- Third-team All-SEC (2025)
- Stats at ESPN

Vicari S. Swain (born September 12, 2004) is an American college football cornerback and return specialist for the South Carolina Gamecocks.

== Early life ==
Swain grew up in Carrollton, Georgia, and started playing football at age six. He attended Central High School where he competed in football and baseball and was a top defensive back and wide receiver in the former. As a junior, he posted 55 receptions for 855 yards and eight touchdowns along with 28 tackles and six interceptions. Swain then recorded 44 receptions for 610 yards and seven touchdowns along with 35 tackles and six interceptions as a senior in 2022. A four-star recruit, he committed to play college football for the South Carolina Gamecocks.

== College career ==
Swain appeared in three games for the Gamecocks as a true freshman in 2023. He then made 13 appearances as a backup cornerback in 2024, recording 13 tackles and a sack. He became a top cornerback and return specialist for the Gamecocks in 2025. In the first two games, Swain had three punt return touchdowns, earning Southeastern Conference (SEC) Special Teams Player of the Week both times. He returned a total of 19 punts for 302 yards and three touchdowns during the season, tying Kaden Wetjen for most punt return touchdowns nationally. He also posted 28 tackles, five pass breakups and two interceptions on defense.
