= Fred Johnson (linebacker) =

American football player

No. 0 – South Carolina Gamecocks
- Position: Linebacker
- Class: Junior

Personal information
- Listed height: 6 ft 3 in (1.91 m)
- Listed weight: 241 lb (109 kg)

Career information
- High school: Matthew Fontaine Maury (Norfolk, Virginia)
- College: South Carolina (2024–present)
- Stats at ESPN

Frederick B. "JayR" Johnson is an American football linebacker for the South Carolina Gamecocks.

== Early life ==
Johnson attended Matthew Fontaine Maury High School in Norfolk, Virginia. He was rated as a three-star recruit, 51st overall linebacker, and the 521st overall player in the class of 2024, and committed to play college football for the South Carolina Gamecocks over offers from other schools such as Duke, Rutgers, and Virginia Tech.

== College career ==
As a freshman in 2024, Johnson totaled six tackles and a quarterback hurry. He entered his sophomore season in 2025 as a starter at linebacker for the Gamecocks. In the season opener, Johnson notched 10 tackles and an interception in a win over Virginia Tech Hokies. He finished the season with 61 tackles with three and a half going for a loss, a sack, three pass deflections, an interception, and a fumble recovery in 12 starts.
