= Nyck Harbor =

American football player (born 2005)

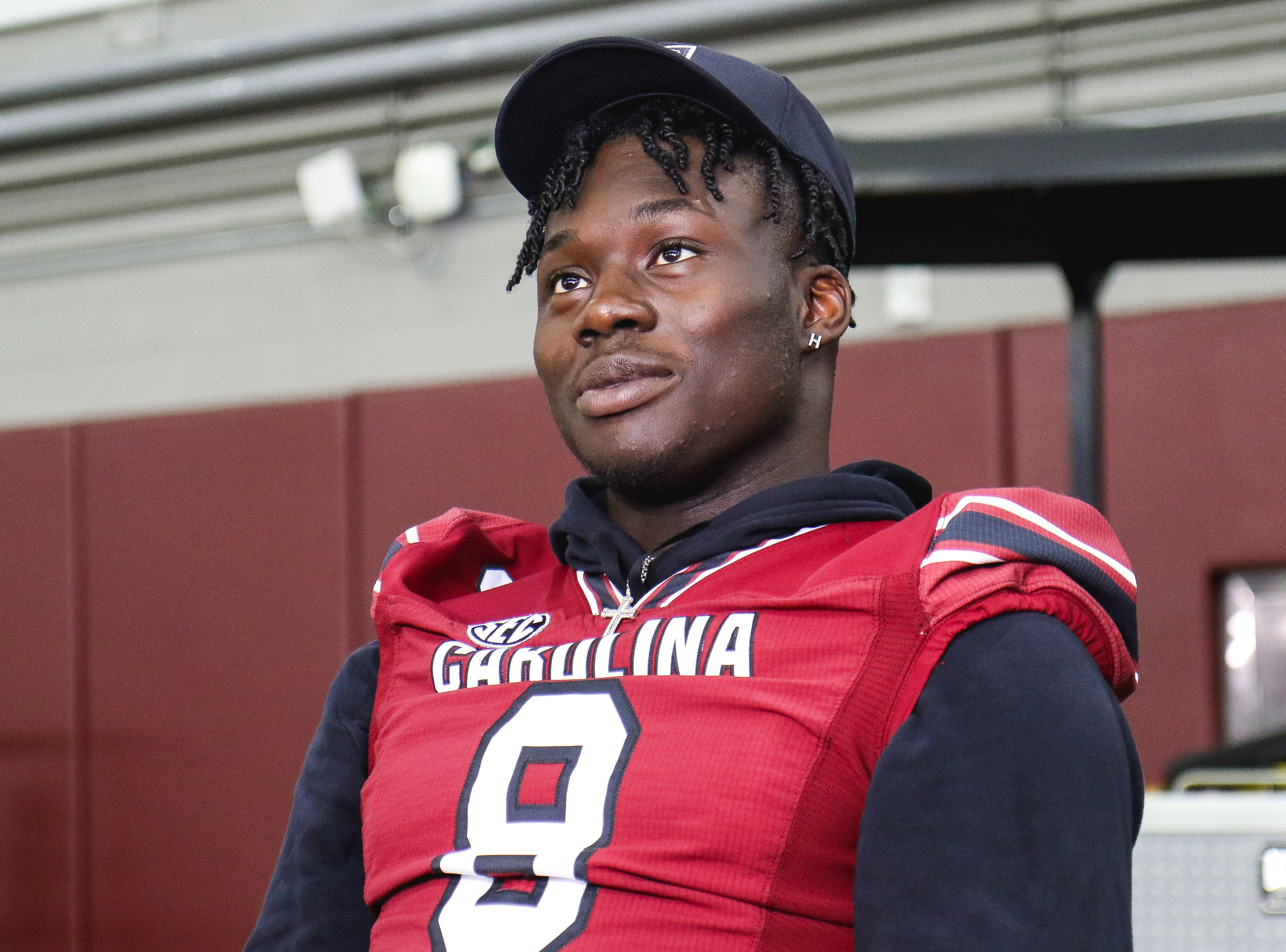
- Harbor in 2023

No. 8 – South Carolina Gamecocks
- Position: Wide receiver
- Class: Senior

Personal information
- Born: July 5, 2005 (age 21)
- Listed height: 6 ft 5 in (1.96 m)
- Listed weight: 242 lb (110 kg)

Career information
- High school: Archbishop Carroll, (Washington, D.C.)
- College: South Carolina (2023–present)
- Stats at ESPN

Nyckoles Harbor (born July 5, 2005) is an American college football wide receiver and sprinter for the South Carolina Gamecocks.

== Early life ==
Harbor was born on July 5, 2005, and attended Archbishop Carroll High School in Washington, D.C., where he played high school football as a tight end and defensive end. He was selected twice as the Gatorade Player of the Year in the District of Columbia. He was rated as a five-star recruit and one of the best players in the 2023 college football recruiting class; he was ranked at No. 9 by Rivals.com and No. 11 by 247Sports. Harbor was the 31st recipient of the Franklin D. Watkins Memorial Award, which the National Alliance of African American Athletes awards to high-school senior male athletes who demonstrate academic, athletic, and community-service excellence.

== College career ==
After receiving dozens of offers, Harbor committed to the University of South Carolina and enrolled there in the summer of 2023. In August 2023, sportswriter Bruce Feldman of The Athletic ranked Harbor first on his annual list of college-football "freaks". It was the first time in 20 years of preparing the "Freaks List" that Feldman rated a true freshman as his number-one football freak. Feldman wrote that Harbor was a rare athlete because of his large size (6-foot-5, 242 pounds) combined with speed (10.22-second 100-meter time).

In his freshman year for the Gamecocks, Harbor tallied 12 receptions for a total of 195 yards and one touchdown.

In the football offseason, Harbor competes for the South Carolina track and field team. He finished fifth at the Southeastern Conference indoor track and field championships in the 200m and eighth in the 60m dash. During the outdoor track season, Harbor earned second-team All-American honors in the 100m and 200m, recording times of 10.11 and 20.20 seconds, respectively. Harbor was named SEC Co-Freshman of the Week after recording the third-fastest 100m in Gamecock history.

== Personal ==
Harbor's Nigerian-born father, Jean Harbor, played professional soccer in the United States for 12 years and was the second overall pick in the 1996 MLS Inaugural Player Draft. He played in 15 games for the U.S. national team.
