= Florence Public School District One =

School district in South Carolina, United States

Address
- 319 South Irby Street Florence, South Carolina, 29501; United States

District information
- Type: Public
- Grades: PK–12
- Schools: 24
- NCES District ID: 4502130

Students and staff
- Students: 15,861 (2024–2025)
- Teachers: 1,184.60 (on an FTE basis) (2024–2025)
- Staff: 1,425.10 (on an FTE basis) (2024–2025)
- Student–teacher ratio: 13.39 (2024–2025)

Other information
- Website: www.f1s.org

Florence Public School District One manages the schools in a 284 square mile region around Florence, South Carolina, United States. It is the largest of the school districts in Florence County, containing all or parts of Claussen, Effingham, Evergreen, Oakdale, Quinby, and Mars Bluff, as well as the City of Florence.

== Schools ==
=== High schools (Grades 9-12) ===
- South Florence High School
- West Florence High School
- Wilson High School

=== Middle schools (Grades 6-8) ===
- Henry L. Sneed Middle School
- John W. Moore Intermediate School
- Southside Middle School
- Williams Middle School

=== Elementary schools (Grades K-5) ===
- Briggs Elementary School
- Carver Elementary School
- Delmae Heights Elementary School
- Dewey L. Carter Elementary School
- Greenwood Elementary School
- Henry L. Timrod Elementary School
- Lucy T. Davis Elementary School
- McLaurin Elementary School (Kindergarten-2nd grade) (including a Montessori program for ages 3–9)
- North Vista Elementary School (including a Montessori program for ages 3–12)
- Royall Elementary School
- Savannah Grove Elementary School
- Theodore Lester Elementary School
- Wallace Gregg Elementary School

== Zero-tolerance policy controversy and investigation ==
After the school district passed a zero-tolerance policy on December 9, 2021, the Florence Branch of the NAACP filed a Title IV complaint to the Department of Education over the alleged harm the policy would cause to students of color, leading to an investigation.
