= Clayton White =

American football player and coach (born 1977)

Current position
- Title: Defensive coordinator
- Team: South Carolina
- Conference: SEC

Biographical details
- Born: December 2, 1977 (age 48); Dunn, North Carolina, U.S.

Playing career
- 1997–2000: NC State
- 2001–2002: New York Giants
- 2003: Tampa Bay Buccaneers*
- Position: Linebacker

Coaching career (HC unless noted)
- 2003: Jesse O. Sanderson HS (NC) (DB)
- 2004–2005: Western Carolina (DB/RC)
- 2006: Western Michigan (DB/ST)
- 2007–2009: Stanford (DB)
- 2010: Western Kentucky (co-STC/DB)
- 2011–2012: UConn (STC/RB)
- 2013–2016: NC State (co-STC/S)
- 2017–2020: Western Kentucky (DC/CB)
- 2021–present: South Carolina (DC/ILB)

Clayton White (born December 2, 1977) is an American football coach and former player who is serving as the defensive coordinator for the South Carolina Gamecocks. Prior to being hired at South Carolina, he was the defensive coordinator for the Western Kentucky Hilltoppers. He played college football for NC State.

== Playing career ==
=== College ===
White grew up in Dunn, North Carolina, and attended Triton High School in nearby Erwin, where he played quarterback and linebacker. Out of high school he attended North Carolina State University. He started at linebacker and special teams in 1999 and 2000. White set multiple records at NC State: career tackles for loss, single-season tackles for loss, and tackles in a single game. He graduated in 2001 with a degree in sports management.

=== NFL ===
In the NFL, he spent two seasons with the New York Giants as a linebacker and a special teamer. He played in every Giants game during the 2001 season. White injured his knee during an April 2002 practice. He did not appear in a game during the 2002 season, and the Giants cut him in February 2003. He then signed with the Tampa Bay Buccaneers but was cut during training camp prior to the start of the 2003 NFL season.

== Coaching career ==
=== Early coaching career ===
Following his release White turned to coaching, and was hired as an assistant coach at Sanderson High School in Raleigh, North Carolina, coaching defensive backs. Tim Gillespie, the head coach, was also a former NC State player. He then spent 2004 and 2005 as Western Carolina's defensive backs coach. In 2006 he worked at Western Michigan as the team's defensive backs coach and special teams coordinator.

=== Stanford ===
From 2007 to 2009 White coached the defensive backs at Stanford.

=== Western Kentucky (first stint) ===
In 2010 White spent the season at WKU on Willie Taggart's first staff. There he served as the Co-Special Teams Coordinator and Defensive Backs Coach.

=== UConn ===
White served as the special teams coordinator and running backs coach for the Huskies in 2011 and 2012.

=== NC State ===
From 2013 to 2016 White worked as the co-special teams coordinator and safeties coach for NC State.

=== Western Kentucky (second stint) ===
In 2017 White returned to Western Kentucky as the team's defensive coordinator and cornerbacks coach. He remained in that position until after the 2020 season.

=== South Carolina ===
In 2021 White was hired to be the defensive coordinator and inside linebackers coach for the Gamecocks as a part of Shane Beamer's inaugural staff.

White's 2021 defense finished tied for 11th in the nation in forced turnovers with 23 takeaways.
