= Mazeo Bennett =

American football player (born 2005

No. 3 – South Carolina Gamecocks
- Position: Wide receiver
- Class: Junior

Personal information
- Born: October 16, 2005 (age 21); Greenville, South Carolina, U.S.
- Listed height: 5 ft 10 in (1.78 m)
- Listed weight: 185 lb (84 kg)

Career information
- High school: Greenville Senior
- College: South Carolina (2024–present)
- Stats at ESPN

Mazeo D. Bennett Jr. (born October 16, 2005) is an American college football wide receiver for the South Carolina Gamecocks.

== Early life ==
Bennett attended Greenville Senior High School in Greenville, South Carolina. As a junior in 2022, he hauled in 47 receptions for 857 yards and 14 touchdowns. Coming out of high school, Bennett was rated as a four-star recruit and the 217th overall player in the class of 2024, receiving offers from schools such as Alabama, Georgia, South Carolina, Tennessee, and Texas A&M. Initially, Bennett committed to play college football for the Tennessee Volunteers. He later flipped his commitment to play for the in-state South Carolina Gamecocks.

== College career ==
Bennett made his collegiate debut in the 2024 season opener, hauling in two receptions for 18 yards. In week 2, he hauled in his first career touchdown on a 24-yard reception versus Kentucky. In week 4, Bennett tallied five receptions for 71 yards and a touchdown versus Akron. In week 9, he notched two receptions for 19 yards versus Texas A&M before leaving the game with an injury.
