= Nick Barrett (American football) =

American football player (born 2003)

No. 91 – Los Angeles Chargers
- Position: Defensive tackle
- Roster status: Active

Personal information
- Born: July 28, 2003 (age 23); Goldsboro, North Carolina, U.S.
- Listed height: 6 ft 3 in (1.91 m)
- Listed weight: 327 lb (148 kg)

Career information
- High school: Eastern Wayne (Goldsboro, North Carolina)
- College: South Carolina (2021–2025)
- NFL draft: 2026: 5th round, 145th overall pick

Career history
- Los Angeles Chargers (2026–present)

Career NFL statistics as of Week 4, 2026
- Tackles: 6
- Sacks: 0.5
- Stats at Pro Football Reference

Nicholas Brian Barrett (born July 28, 2003) is an American professional football defensive tackle for the Los Angeles Chargers of the National Football League (NFL). He previously played college football for South Carolina Gamecocks and was selected by the Chargers in the fifth round of the 2026 NFL draft.

== Early life ==
Barrett attended Eastern Wayne High School in Goldsboro, North Carolina. As a junior in 2019, he had 66 tackles and 15 sacks. He did not play his senior year because of the Covid-19 Pandemic. Barrett committed to the University of South Carolina to play college football.

== College career ==
Barrett spent his first four seasons at South Carolina from 2021 to 2024 as a backup, recording 30 tackles and one interception. He redshirted the 2024 season after appearing in only four games. He started all 12 games his senior year in 2025 and had 42 tackles and two sacks.

== Professional career ==
Pre-draft measurables
Height	Weight	Arm length	Hand span	Wingspan	40-yard dash	10-yard split	20-yard split	20-yard shuttle	Three-cone drill	Vertical jump	Broad jump	Bench press
6 ft 2 7/8 in (1.90 m)	312 lb (142 kg)	33 3/8 in (0.85 m)	10 in (0.25 m)	6 ft 8 3/4 in (2.05 m)	5.10 s	1.71 s	2.89 s	4.83 s	7.91 s	31.5 in (0.80 m)	9 ft 0 in (2.74 m)	31 reps
All values from NFL Combine/Pro Day

Barrett was selected by the Los Angeles Chargers in the fifth round with the 145th overall pick of the 2026 NFL draft.
