= Jalon Kilgore =

American football player (born 2005)

No. 29 – Buffalo Bills
- Position: Safety
- Roster status: Active

Personal information
- Born: January 27, 2005 (age 21)
- Listed height: 6 ft 1 in (1.85 m)
- Listed weight: 210 lb (95 kg)

Career information
- High school: Putnam County (Eatonton, Georgia)
- College: South Carolina (2023–2025)
- NFL draft: 2026: 5th round, 167th overall pick

Career history
- Buffalo Bills (2026–present)

Awards and highlights
- 2× Second-team All-SEC (2024, 2025); SEC All-Freshman Team (2023)

Career NFL statistics as of Week 11, 2026
- Total tackles: 5
- Stats at Pro Football Reference

Jalon Kilgore (born January 27, 2005) is an American professional football safety for the Buffalo Bills of the National Football League (NFL). He played college football for the South Carolina Gamecocks and was selected by the Bills in the fifth round of the 2026 NFL draft.

== Early life ==
Kilgore attended Putnam County High School in Eatonton, Georgia. He was rated as a three-star recruit, the number 44 safety, and the 43rd best prospect in the state of Georgia in the class of 2023. Kilgore committed to play college football for the South Carolina Gamecocks over numerous Power 4 offers.

== College career ==
In his first career game in the 2023 season opener, Kilgore notched 12 tackles versus North Carolina. He finished his freshman season with 76 tackles with one and a half for a being for a loss, six pass deflections, an interception, and a forced fumble. Kilgore was named a freshman all-American and was named to the SEC all-freshman team.

== Professional career ==
Pre-draft measurables
| Height | Weight | Arm length | Hand span | Wingspan | 40-yard dash | 10-yard split | 20-yard split | 20-yard shuttle | Vertical jump | Broad jump | Bench press |
|---|---|---|---|---|---|---|---|---|---|---|---|
| 6 ft 1 3/8 in (1.86 m) | 210 lb (95 kg) | 32 7/8 in (0.84 m) | 9 3/8 in (0.24 m) | 6 ft 7 1/4 in (2.01 m) | 4.40 s | 1.56 s | 2.59 s | 4.32 s | 37.0 in (0.94 m) | 10 ft 10 in (3.30 m) | 16 reps |
All values from NFL Combine

Kilgore was selected by the Buffalo Bills in the fifth round with the 167th overall pick of the 2026 NFL draft.

== Personal life ==
Kilgore is the younger brother of Gerald Kilgore who is also a safety for South Carolina.
