= Gabe Brownlow-Dindy =

American football player (born 2003)

Gabriel Brownlow-Dindy
- Brownlow-Dindy with the South Carolina Gamecocks in 2026

No. 99 – South Carolina Gamecocks
- Position: Defensive tackle
- Class: Redshirt Senior

Personal information
- Born: November 12, 2003 (age 22)
- Listed height: 6 ft 3 in (1.91 m)
- Listed weight: 311 lb (141 kg)

Career information
- High school: Lakeland (Lakeland, Florida)
- College: Texas A&M (2022–2024); South Carolina (2025–present)
- Stats at ESPN

Gabriel Brownlow-Dindy (born November 12, 2003) is an American college football defensive tackle for the South Carolina Gamecocks. He previously played for the Texas A&M Aggies.

Brownlow-Dindy played high school football at Lakeland High School in Lakeland, Florida. He was rated by ESPN as the No. 3 football recruit in the 2022 recruiting class. He was also rated No. 8 nationally by 247Sports.

Brownlow-Dindy initially committed to play college football for Oklahoma. In January 2022, he withdrew his commitment to Oklahoma and instead committed to Texas A&M. He was part of a recruiting class at Texas A&M that is rated as the best in the history of recruiting rankings.
