= Justin Okoronkwo =

American football player

Caleb Woodson
No. 17 – South Carolina Gamecocks
- Position: Linebacker
- Class: Senior

Personal information
- Listed height: 6 ft 3 in (1.91 m)
- Listed weight: 230 lb (104 kg)

Career information
- High school: Therese von Bayern School (Munich, Germany)
- College: Alabama (2024); South Carolina (2025–present)

Justin Okoronkwo is a German college football linebacker for the South Carolina Gamecocks. He previously played for the Alabama Crimson Tide.

== Early life ==
Okoronkwo attended Therese von Bayern School in Munich, Germany. He grew up playing association football and gymnastics and did not start playing American football until he played for club teams starting in 2021. He was selected to play in the 2024 All-American Bowl. He committed to the University of Alabama to play college football.

== College career ==
Okoronkwo played all 13 games his freshman year at Alabama in 2024, recording 14 tackles. After the season, he entered the transfer portal and committed to the University of South Carolina. In his first year at South Carolina in 2025, he started eight of 12 games and had 63 tackles and one interception. Okoronkwo returned to South Carolina as a starter in 2026.
