= 2025 Virginia Tech Hokies football team =

American college football season

2025 Virginia Tech Hokies football
- Conference: Atlantic Coast Conference
- Record: 3–9 (2–6 ACC)
- Head coach: Brent Pry (4th season; first 3 games); Philip Montgomery (interim; remainder of season)
- Offensive coordinator: Philip Montgomery (1st season)
- Offensive scheme: Veer and shoot
- Defensive coordinator: Sam Siefkes (1st season)
- Base defense: 4–2–5
- Home stadium: Lane Stadium

2025 Atlantic Coast Conference football standings
	Conf.			Overall
Team	W		L	W		L
No. 16 Virginia y	7	–	1	11	–	3
Duke y$	6	–	2	9	–	5
No. 2 Miami (FL) ^	6	–	2	13	–	3
Georgia Tech	6	–	2	9	–	4
SMU	6	–	2	9	–	4
Pittsburgh	6	–	2	8	–	5
Louisville	4	–	4	9	–	4
Wake Forest	4	–	4	9	–	4
NC State	4	–	4	8	–	5
California	4	–	4	7	–	6
Clemson	4	–	4	7	–	6
Stanford	3	–	5	4	–	8
Florida State	2	–	6	5	–	7
Virginia Tech	2	–	6	3	–	9
North Carolina	2	–	6	4	–	8
Boston College	1	–	7	2	–	10
Syracuse	1	–	7	3	–	9
Championship: Duke 27, Virginia 20^{OT}
^ – College Football Playoff participant; $ – Conference champion; y – Championship game participant; As of November 8, 2026; Rankings from AP Poll

The 2025 Virginia Tech Hokies football team represented Virginia Tech as a member of the Atlantic Coast Conference (ACC) during the 2025 NCAA Division I FBS football season. The Hokies played their home games at Lane Stadium on the Campus of Virginia Tech in Blacksburg, Virginia.

The first three games were led by fourth-year head coach Brent Pry, until his firing after a lopsided loss to Old Dominion. Offensive coordinator Philip Montgomery, former head coach of Tulsa, was named as interim head coach.

The Virginia Tech Hokies drew an average home attendance of 59,946.

== Schedule ==
Date	Time	Opponent	Site	TV	Result	Attendance
August 31	3:00 p.m.	vs. No. 13 South Carolina*	Mercedes-Benz Stadium; Atlanta, GA (Aflac Kickoff Game)	ESPN	L 11–24	55,531
September 6	7:30 p.m.	Vanderbilt*	Lane Stadium; Blacksburg, VA	ACCN	L 20–44	65,632
September 13	7:00 p.m.	Old Dominion*	Lane Stadium; Blacksburg, VA	ACCN	L 26–45	57,627
September 20	12:00 p.m.	Wofford*	Lane Stadium; Blacksburg, VA	ACCNX/ESPN+	W 38–6	57,229
September 27	7:00 p.m.	at NC State	Carter–Finley Stadium; Raleigh, NC	The CW	W 23–21	56,919
October 4	1:00 p.m.	Wake Forest	Lane Stadium; Blacksburg, VA	The CW	L 23–30	65,632
October 11	3:30 p.m.	at No. 13 Georgia Tech	Bobby Dodd Stadium; Atlanta, GA (rivalry)	ACCN	L 20–35	50,878
October 24	7:30 p.m.	California	Lane Stadium; Blacksburg, VA	ESPN	W 42–34 ^{2OT}	53,837
November 1	3:00 p.m.	No. 16 Louisville	Lane Stadium; Blacksburg, VA	The CW	L 16–28	54,030
November 15	7:30 p.m.	at Florida State	Doak Campbell Stadium; Tallahassee, FL	ACCN	L 14–34	64,937
November 22	12:00 p.m.	No. 13 Miami (FL)	Lane Stadium; Blacksburg, VA (rivalry)	ESPN	L 17–34	65,632
November 29	7:00 p.m.	at No. 18 Virginia	Scott Stadium; Charlottesville, VA (rivalry)	ESPN	L 7–27	58,832
*Non-conference game; Rankings from AP Poll (and CFP Rankings, after November 4) - Released prior to game; All times are in Eastern time

== Game summaries ==
=== vs. No. 13 South Carolina ===
Virginia Tech Hokies (0–0) vs No. 13 South Carolina Gamecocks (0–0) – Game summary

Quarter	1	2	3	4	Total
Hokies	2	6	0	3	11
No. 13 Gamecocks	7	3	0	14	24

at Mercedes-Benz Stadium • Atlanta, Georgia

- Date: August 31
- Game time: 3:00 p.m. EDT
- Game weather: Sunny (retractable roof open)
- Game attendance: 55,531
- Referee: Michael VanderVelde
- TV announcers (ESPN): Bob Wischusen (play-by-play), Louis Riddick (analyst), and Kris Budden (sideline reporter)

Game information

First quarter

- SC – LaNorris Sellers 15-yard run (William Joyce kick), 12:09. Gamecocks 7–0. Drive: 7 plays, 75 yards, 2:51.
- VT – Team Safety, 4:33. Gamecocks 7–2.

Second quarter

- VT – John Love 29-yard field goal, 13:45. Gamecocks 7–5. Drive: 8 plays, 59 yards, 2:32.
- SC – William Joyce 27-yard field goal, 3:42. Gamecocks 10–5. Drive: 13 plays, 70 yards, 5:01.
- VT – John Love 56-yard field goal, 0:00. Gamecocks 10–8. Drive: 11 plays, 37 yards, 3:42.

Third quarter

No scoring plays.

Fourth quarter

- SC – Vicari Swain 80-yard punt return (William Joyce kick), 13:36. Gamecocks 17–8.
- VT – John Love 39-yard field goal, 9:00. Gamecocks 17–11. Drive: 9 plays, 58 yards, 4:36.
- SC – Nyck Harbor 64-yard pass from LaNorris Sellers (William Joyce kick), 7:42. Gamecocks 24–11. Drive: 3 plays, 75 yards, 1:18.

Statistics	VT	SC
First downs	19	16
Plays–yards	72–336	56–328
Rushes–yards	37–115	37–119
Passing yards	221	209
Passing: comp–att–int	15–35–2	12–19–0
Turnovers	2	0
Time of possession	34:09	25:51

Team	Category	Player	Statistics
Virginia Tech	Passing	Kyron Drones	15/35, 221 yards, 2 INT
Virginia Tech	Rushing	Marcellous Hawkins	15 carries, 58 yards
Virginia Tech	Receiving	Donavon Greene	3 receptions, 94 yards
South Carolina	Passing	LaNorris Sellers	12/19, 209 yards, TD
South Carolina	Rushing	Oscar Adaway III	14 carries, 60 yards
South Carolina	Receiving	Nyck Harbor	3 Receptions, 99 yards, TD

=== Vanderbilt ===
Vanderbilt Commodores (1–0) at Virginia Tech Hokies (0–1) – game summary

Quarter	1	2	3	4	Total
Commodores	0	10	13	21	44
Hokies	10	10	0	0	20

at Lane Stadium • Blacksburg, Virginia

- Date: September 6
- Game time: 7:30 p.m. EDT
- Game weather:
- Game attendance: 65,632
- Referee: Kyle Olson
- TV announcers (ACCN): Wes Durham (play-by-play), Steve Addazio (analyst), and Dana Boyle (sideline)

Game information

First quarter

- VT – John Love 28-yard field goal, 7:11. Hokies 3–0. Drive: 15 plays, 64 yards, 7:49.
- VT – Ja'Ricous Hairston 2-yard pass from Kyron Drones (John Love kick), 0:06. Hokies 10–0. Drive: 8 plays, 85 yards, 4:27.

Second quarter

- VAN – Brycen Coleman 54-yard pass from Diego Pavia (Brock Taylor kick), 14:51. Hokies 10–7. Drive: 2 plays, 75 yards, 0:15.
- VT – Kyron Drones 1-yard run (John Love kick), 11:10. Hokies 17–7. Drive: 6 plays, 27 yards, 2:15.
- VAN – Brock Taylor 29-yard field goal, 4:19. Hokies 17–10. Drive: 12 plays, 64 yards, 6:51.
- VT – John Love 27-yard field goal, 0:00. Hokies 20–10. Drive: 13 plays, 65 yards, 4:19.

Third quarter

- VAN – Makhilyn Young 1-yard run (Brock Taylor kick), 8:02. Hokies 20–17. Drive: 11 plays, 75 yards, 6:58.
- VAN – Tre Richardson 26-yard pass from Diego Pavia (Brock Taylor kick failed), 0:24. Commodores 23–20. Drive: 7 plays, 75 yards, 5:26.

Fourth quarter

- VAN – Sedrick Alexander 18-yard run (Brock Taylor kick), 10:13. Commodores 30–20. Drive: 8 plays, 56 yards, 4:30.
- VAN – Sedrick Alexander 6-yard run (Brock Taylor kick), 6:05. Commodores 37–20. Drive: 3 plays, 72 yards, 1:39.
- VAN – Eli Stowers 9-yard pass from Blaze Berlowitz (Brock Taylor kick), 2:12. Commodores 44–20. Drive: 7 plays, 31 yards, 2:21.

Statistics	VAN	VT
First downs	23	16
Plays–yards	57–490	60–248
Rushes–yards	37–262	31–114
Passing yards	228	134
Passing: comp–att–int	14–20–1	17–29–0
Turnovers	2	1
Time of possession	32:12	27:48

Team	Category	Player	Statistics
Vanderbilt	Passing	Diego Pavia	12/18, 193 Yards, 2 TD, INT
Vanderbilt	Rushing	Makhilyn Young	8 Rushes, 95 Yards, TD
Vanderbilt	Receiving	Eli Stowers	4 Receptions, 29 Yards, TD
Virginia Tech	Passing	Kyron Drones	17/29, 134 Yards, TD
Virginia Tech	Rushing	Kyron Drones	13 Rushes, 36 Yards, TD
Virginia Tech	Receiving	Cameron Seldon	3 Receptions, 10 Yards

=== Old Dominion ===
Old Dominion Monarchs (1–1) at Virginia Tech Hokies (0–2) – game summary

Quarter	1	2	3	4	Total
Monarchs	7	21	10	7	45
Hokies	0	0	7	19	26

at Lane Stadium • Blacksburg, Virginia

- Date: September 13
- Game time: 7:00 p.m. EDT
- Game weather: Sunny • Temperature: 78 °F (26 °C) • Wind: NW 1 mph
- Game attendance: 57,627
- Referee: Darryl DeBerry
- TV announcers (ACCN): Jorge Sedano (play-by-play), Jay Walker (analyst), and Victoria Arlen (sideline)

Game information

First quarter

- ODU – Colton Joseph 6-yard run (Riley Callaghan kick), 6:30. Monarchs 7–0. Drive: 5 plays, 93 yards, 2:24.

Second quarter

- ODU – Maurki James 10-yard run (Riley Callaghan kick), 12:38. Monarchs 14–0. Drive: 7 plays, 97 yards, 3:25.
- ODU – Trequan Jones 11-yard run (Riley Callaghan kick), 6:44. Monarchs 21–0. Drive: 9 plays, 88 yards, 3:31.
- ODU – Tre' Brown III 13-yard pass from Colton Joseph (Riley Callaghan kick), 0:53. Monarchs 28–0. Drive: 8 plays, 77 yards, 1:53.

Third quarter

- ODU – Riley Callaghan 50-yard field goal, 9:54. Monarchs 31–0. Drive: 8 plays, 24 yards, 3:05.
- VT – Donavon Greene 10-yard pass from Kyron Drones (John Love kick), 4:32. Monarchs 31–7. Drive: 3 plays, 77 yards, 0:44.
- ODU – Na'eem Abdul-Rahim Gladding 13-yard pass from Colton Joseph (Riley Callaghan kick), 1:49. Monarchs 38–7. Drive: 5 plays, 46 yards, 2:42.

Fourth quarter

- VT – Kyron Drones 4-yard run (pass failed), 12:06. Monarchs 38–13. Drive: 12 plays, 82 yards, 4:38.
- ODU – Devin Roche 15-yard run (Riley Callaghan kick), 7:02. Monarchs 45–13. Drive: 7 plays, 75 yards, 5:04.
- VT – Donavon Greene 23-yard pass from Kyron Drones (run failed), 4:20. Monarchs 45–19. Drive: 7 plays, 58 yards, 2:34.
- VT – Tyler Mason 3-yard pass from Kyron Drones (John Love kick), 1:56. Monarchs 45–26. Drive: 9 plays, 54 yards, 2:23.

Statistics	ODU	VT
First downs	29	24
Plays–yards	61–527	73–433
Rushes–yards	39–251	34–167
Passing yards	276	266
Passing: comp–att–int	16–22–0	26–39–1
Turnovers	1	3
Time of possession	29:57	30:03

Team	Category	Player	Statistics
Old Dominion	Passing	Colton Joseph	16/22, 276 yards, 2 TD
Old Dominion	Rushing	Trequan Jones	13 rushes, 101 yards, TD
Old Dominion	Receiving	Ja'Cory Thomas	3 receptions, 83 yards
Virginia Tech	Passing	Kyron Drones	26/39, 266 yards, 3 TD, INT
Virginia Tech	Rushing	Kyron Drones	18 rushes, 65 yards, TD
Virginia Tech	Receiving	Donavon Greene	5 receptions, 77 yards, 2 TD

=== Wofford (FCS) ===
Wofford Terriers (FCS) (0–3) at Virginia Tech Hokies (0–3) – game summary

Quarter	1	2	3	4	Total
Terriers (FCS)	0	3	0	3	6
Hokies	7	14	10	7	38

at Lane Stadium • Blacksburg, Virginia

- Date: September 20
- Game time: 12:00 p.m. EDT
- Game weather:
- Game attendance: 57,229
- Referee: Nolan Dumas
- TV announcers (ACCNX/ESPN+): Doug Sherman (play-by-play) and Forrest Conoly (analyst)

Game information

First quarter

- VT – Braydon Bennett 3-yard run (John Love kick), 6:26. Hokies 7–0. Drive: 4 plays, 68 yards, 2:04.

Second quarter

- VT – Devin Alves 19-yard pass from Kyron Drones (John Love kick), 11:53. Hokies 14–0. Drive: 9 plays, 80 yards, 3:40.
- VT – Ayden Greene 18-yard pass from Kyron Drones (John Love kick), 6:24. Hokies 21–0. Drive: 8 plays, 69 yards, 3:05.
- WOF – Sam Spence 43-yard field goal, 0:43. Hokies 21–3. Drive: 8 plays, 35 yards, 2:42.

Third quarter

- VT – John Love 20-yard field goal, 9:00. Hokies 24–3. Drive: 11 plays, 62 yards, 5:49.
- VT – Kyron Drones 1-yard run (John Love kick), 1:08. Hokies 31–3. Drive: 10 plays, 56 yards, 5:37.

Fourth quarter

- WOF – Sam Spence 42-yard field goal, 13:18. Hokies 31–6. Drive: 8 plays, 51 yards, 2:50.
- VT – Kyron Drones 2-yard run (John Love kick), 10:52. Hokies 38–6. Drive: 6 plays, 65 yards, 2:26.

Statistics	WOF	VT
First downs	8	28
Plays–yards	50–141	71–461
Rushes–yards	23–(-1)	37–154
Passing yards	142	307
Passing: comp–att–int	16–27–1	27–34–0
Turnovers	1	1
Time of possession	25:31	34:29

Team	Category	Player	Statistics
Wofford	Passing	Jayden Whitaker	16/27, 142 yards, INT
Wofford	Rushing	Ihson Jackson-Anderson	7 carries, 12 yards
Wofford	Receiving	Isaiah Scott	3 receptions, 57 yards
Virginia Tech	Passing	Kyron Drones	27/32, 307 yards, 2 TD
Virginia Tech	Rushing	Marcellous Hawkins	13 carries, 97 yards
Virginia Tech	Receiving	P.J. Prioleau	7 receptions, 65 yards

=== at NC State ===
Virginia Tech Hokies (1–3) at NC State Wolfpack (3–1) – game summary

Quarter	1	2	3	4	Total
Hokies	3	10	7	3	23
Wolfpack	7	0	7	7	21

at Carter–Finley Stadium • Raleigh, North Carolina

- Date: September 27
- Game time: 7:00 p.m. EDT
- Game weather: Cloudy, 75 °F (24 °C)
- Game attendance: 56,919
- Referee: Jon Noli
- TV announcers (The CW): Thom Brennaman (play-by-play), Will Blackmon (analyst), and Wes Bryant (sideline)

Game information

First quarter

- VT – John Love 39-yard field goal, 8:51. Hokies 3–0. Drive: 5 plays, 19 yards, 1:00.
- NCSU – Dante Daniels 4-yard pass from CJ Bailey (Kanoah Vinesett kick), 2:38. Wolfpack 7–3. Drive: 12 plays, 75 yards, 6:13.

Second quarter

- VT – Marcellous Hawkins 11-yard pass from Kyron Drones (John Love kick), 9:26. Hokies 10–7. Drive: 10 plays, 62 yards, 4:41.
- VT – John Love 32-yard field goal, 2:26. Hokies 13–7. Drive: 11 plays, 77 yards, 4:07.

Third quarter

- NCSU – Keenan Jackson 13-yard pass from CJ Bailey (Kanoah Vinesett kick), 9:10. Wolfpack 14–13. Drive: 12 plays, 75 yards, 5:50.
- VT – Cameron Seldon 4-yard pass from Kyron Drones (John Love kick), 0:20. Hokies 20–14. Drive: 2 plays, 89 yards, 0:44.

Fourth quarter

- NCSU – Jayden Scott 1-yard run (Kanoah Vinesett kick), 10:58. Wolfpack 21–20. Drive: 10 plays, 75 yards, 4:22.
- VT – John Love 49-yard field goal, 6:31. Hokies 23–21. Drive: 9 plays, 35 yards, 4:20.

Statistics	VT	NCSU
First downs	18	18
Plays–yards	65–406	66–299
Rushes–yards	31–229	32–59
Passing yards	177	240
Passing: comp–att–int	20–34–0	26–34–0
Turnovers	0	0
Time of possession	29:49	30:11

Team	Category	Player	Statistics
Virginia Tech	Passing	Kyron Drones	20/34, 177 yards, 2 TD
Virginia Tech	Rushing	Terion Stewart	15 carries, 174 yards
Virginia Tech	Receiving	Ayden Greene	3 receptions, 44 yards
NC State	Passing	CJ Bailey	26/34, 240 yards, 2 TD
NC State	Rushing	Hollywood Smothers	16 carries, 67 yards
NC State	Receiving	Terrell Anderson	4 receptions, 65 yards

=== Wake Forest ===
Wake Forest Demon Deacons (2–2) at Virginia Tech Hokies (2–3) – game summary

Quarter	1	2	3	4	Total
Demon Deacons	3	21	3	3	30
Hokies	7	7	9	0	23

at Lane Stadium • Blacksburg, Virginia

- Date: October 4
- Game time: 1:00 p.m. EDT
- Game weather: Sunny • Temperature: 70 °F (21 °C) • Wind: NE at 2 mph
- Game attendance: 65,632
- Referee: Riley Johnson
- TV announcers (The CW): Thom Brennaman (play-by-play), Will Blackmon (analyst), and Wes Bryant (sideline)

Game information

First quarter

- WF – Connor Calvert 33-yard field goal, 8:40. Demon Deacons 3–0. Drive: 4 plays, -3 yards, 1:47.
- VT – Marcellous Hawkins 3-yard run (John Love kick), 2:30. Hokies 7–3. Drive: 8 plays, 43 yards, 3:54.

Second quarter

- WF – Demond Claiborne 11-yard run (Connor Calvert kick), 13:01. Demon Deacons 10–7. Drive: 9 plays, 75 yards, 4:29.
- VT – Takye Heath 9-yard pass from Kyron Drones (John Love kick), 9:46. Hokies 14–10. Drive: 6 plays, 75 yards, 3:15.
- WF – Ty Clark III 3-yard run (Connor Calvert kick), 2:40. Demon Deacons 17–14. Drive: 7 plays, 55 yards, 2:07.
- WF – Eni Falayi 11-yard pass from Robby Ashford (Connor Calvert kick), 0:10. Demon Deacons 24–14. Drive: 7 plays, 44 yards, 1:29.

Third quarter

- VT – John Love 32-yard field goal, 10:24. Demon Deacons 24–17. Drive: 12 plays, 60 yards, 4:36.
- VT – John Love 38-yard field goal, 7:07. Demon Deacons 24–20. Drive: 5 plays, 32 yards, 2:25.
- WF – Connor Calvert 29-yard field goal, 4:41. Demon Deacons 27–20. Drive: 7 plays, 63 yards, 2:26.
- VT – John Love 34-yard field goal, 0:34. Demon Deacons 27–23. Drive: 4 plays, -13 yards, 1:19.

Fourth quarter

- WF – Connor Calvert 27-yard field goal, 2:14. Demon Deacons 30–23. Drive: 13 plays, 59 yards, 6:30.

Statistics	WAKE	VT
First downs	19	16
Plays–yards	72–347	63–263
Rushes–yards	32–91	35–152
Passing yards	256	111
Passing: comp–att–int	24–40–1	14–28–1
Turnovers	1	1
Time of possession	32:40	27:20

Team	Category	Player	Statistics
Wake Forest	Passing	Robby Ashford	24/39, 256 yards, TD, INT
Wake Forest	Rushing	Demond Claiborne	7 carries, 29 yards, TD
Wake Forest	Receiving	Sawyer Racanelli	3 receptions, 88 yards
Virginia Tech	Passing	Kyron Drones	14/28, 111 yards, TD, INT
Virginia Tech	Rushing	Terion Stewart	9 carries, 62 yards
Virginia Tech	Receiving	Donavon Greene	4 receptions, 52 yards

=== at No. 13 Georgia Tech (rivalry) ===
Virginia Tech Hokies (2–4) at No. 13 Georgia Tech Yellow Jackets (5–0) – game summary

Quarter	1	2	3	4	Total
Hokies	0	7	7	6	20
No. 13 Yellow Jackets	15	6	7	7	35

at Bobby Dodd Stadium • Atlanta, Georgia

- Date: October 11
- Game time: 3:30 p.m. EDT
- Game weather:
- Game attendance: 50,878
- Referee: Mike Roche
- TV announcers (ACCN): Wes Durham (play-by-play), Steve Addazio (analyst), and Dana Boyle (sideline)

Game information

First quarter

- GT – Haynes King 2-yard run (Haynes King–Malik Rutherford pass), 10:53. Yellow Jackets 8–0. Drive: 9 plays, 80 yards, 4:01.
- GT – Malik Rutherford 9-yard pass from Haynes King (Aidan Birr kick), 4:34. Yellow Jackets 15–0. Drive: 6 plays, 38 yards, 2:36.

Second quarter

- GT – Aidan Birr 25-yard field goal, 9:01. Yellow Jackets 18–0. Drive: 12 plays, 90 yards, 6:16.
- VT – Kyron Drones 32-yard run (John Love kick), 2:52. Yellow Jackets 18–7. Drive: 2 plays, 46 yards, 0:37.
- GT – Aidan Birr 30-yard field goal, 0:04. Yellow Jackets 21–7. Drive: 9 plays, 62 yards, 3:09.

Third quarter

- VT – Ja'Ricous Hairston 33-yard pass from Kyron Drones (John Love kick), 11:34. Yellow Jackets 21–14. Drive: 9 plays, 75 yards, 3:26.
- GT – Malachi Hosley 15-yard run (Aidan Birr kick), 8:23. Yellow Jackets 28–14. Drive: 6 plays, 75 yards, 3:11.

Fourth quarter

- GT – Haynes King 26-yard run (Aidan Birr kick), 11:54. Yellow Jackets 35–14. Drive: 9 plays, 83 yards, 4:47.
- VT – Ja'Ricous Hairston 3-yard pass from Kyron Drones (pass failed), 4:58. Yellow Jackets 35–20. Drive: 11 plays, 75 yards, 6:56.

Statistics	VT	GT
First downs	20	28
Plays–yards	55–367	66–481
Rushes–yards	34–186	42–268
Passing yards	181	213
Passing: comp–att–int	13–21–1	20–24–0
Turnovers	1	0
Time of possession	28:06	31:54

Team	Category	Player	Statistics
Virginia Tech	Passing	Kyron Drones	13/21, 181 yards, 2 TD, INT
Virginia Tech	Rushing	Kyron Drones	16 rushes, 83 yards, TD
Virginia Tech	Receiving	Ayden Greene	4 receptions, 72 yards
Georgia Tech	Passing	Haynes King	20/24, 213 yards, TD
Georgia Tech	Rushing	Malachi Hosley	11 rushes, 129 yards, TD
Georgia Tech	Receiving	Malik Rutherford	6 receptions, 49 yards, TD

=== California ===
California Golden Bears (5–2) at Virginia Tech Hokies (2–5) – game summary

Quarter	1	2	3	4	OT	2OT	Total
Golden Bears	3	17	0	7	7	0	34
Hokies	10	0	10	7	7	8	42

at Lane Stadium • Blacksburg, Virginia

- Date: October 24
- Game time: 7:30 p.m. EDT
- Game weather: Temperature: 49 °F (9 °C) • Wind: N at 2 miles per hour (3.2 km/h) • Weather: Clear
- Game attendance: 53,837
- Referee: Tim Hedgepeth
- TV announcers (ESPN): Anish Shroff (play-by-play), Andre Ware (analyst), and Paul Carcaterra (sideline)

Game information

First quarter

- (12:04) VT – Ayden Greene 27-yard pass from Kyron Drones, John Love kick (Drive: 4 plays, 47 yards, 1:21; Virginia Tech 7–0)
- (7:27) VT – John Love 46-yard field goal (Drive: 9 plays, 46 yards, 3:39; Virginia Tech 10–0)
- (2:18) CAL – Chase Meyer 38-yard field goal (Drive: 10 plays, 55 yards, 5:09; Virginia Tech 10–3)

Second quarter

- (14:46) CAL – Kendrick Raphael 1-yard run, Chase Meyer kick (Drive: 4 plays, 51 yards, 1:12; Tied 10–10)
- (9:31) CAL – Chase Meyer 34-yard field goal (Drive: 7 plays, 36 yards, 2:50; California 13–10)
- (1:43) CAL – Kendrick Raphael 1-yard run, Chase Meyer kick (Drive: 8 plays, 21 yards, 3:07; California 20–10)

Third quarter

- (8:45) VT – John Love 52-yard field goal (Drive: 13 plays, 40 yards, 6:15; California 20–13)
- (5:06) VT – Takye Heath 44-yard pass from Kyron Drones, John Love kick (Drive: 4 plays, 86 yards, 1:49; Tied 20–20)

Fourth quarter

- (6:57) VT – Kyron Drones 14-yard run, John Love kick (Drive: 9 plays, 64 yards, 5:09; Virginia Tech 27–20)
- (2:34) CAL – Kendrick Raphael 2-yard run, Chase Meyer kick (Drive: 9 plays, 72 yards, 4:31; Tied 27–27)

Overtime

- CAL – Mason Mini 25-yard pass from Jaron-Keawe Sagapolutele, Chase Meyer kick (Drive: 1 play, 25 yards, 0:00; California 34–27)
- VT – Kyron Drones 17-yard run, John Love kick (Drive: 2 plays, 25 yards, 0:00; Tied 34–34)

Double overtime

- VT – Takye Heath 7-yard pass from Kyron Drones, Kyron Drones run (Drive: 5 plays, 25 yards, 0:00; Virginia Tech 42–34)

Statistics	CAL	VT
First downs	19	24
Plays–yards	67–325	76–476
Rushes–yards	27–39	58–357
Passing yards	286	119
Passing: comp–att–int	24–40–0	9–18–1
Turnovers	0	1
Time of possession	27:46	32:14

Team	Category	Player	Statistics
California	Passing	Jaron-Keawe Sagapolutele	24/39, 286 yards, TD
California	Rushing	Kendrick Raphael	20 carries, 71 yards, 3 TD
California	Receiving	Jacob De Jesus	8 receptions, 86 yards
Virginia Tech	Passing	Kyron Drones	9/18, 119 yards, 3 TD, INT
Virginia Tech	Rushing	Marcellous Hawkins	21 carries, 167 yards
Virginia Tech	Receiving	Takye Heath	4 receptions, 64 yards, 2 TD

=== No. 16 Louisville ===
No. 16 Louisville Cardinals (6–1) at Virginia Tech Hokies (3–5) – game summary

Quarter	1	2	3	4	Total
No. 16 Cardinals	7	0	14	7	28
Hokies	9	7	0	0	16

at Lane Stadium • Blacksburg, Virginia

- Date: November 1
- Game time: 3:00 p.m. EDT
- Game weather: Sunny • Temperature: 58 °F (14 °C) • Wind: W at 3 miles per hour (4.8 km/h)
- Game attendance: 54,030
- Referee: Derryl DeBerry
- TV announcers (The CW): Thom Brennaman (play-by-play), Will Blackmon (analyst), and Wes Bryant (sideline)

Game information

First quarter

- (12:58) LOU – Isaac Brown 52-yard run (Cooper Ranvier kick) (Drive: 2 plays, 62 yards, 0:42; Louisville 7–0)
- (1:57) VT – Kyron Drones 3-yard run (John Love kick) (Drive: 9 plays, 37 yards, 4:56; Tied 7–7)
- (0:52) VT – Team safety (Virginia Tech 9–7)

Second quarter

- (8:25) VT – Cameron Seldon 5-yard pass from Kyron Drones (John Love kick) (Drive: 8 plays, 54 yards, 3:40; Virginia Tech 16–7)

Third quarter

- (9:07) LOU – Caullin Lacy 24-yard pass from Miller Moss (Cooper Ranvier kick) (Drive: 6 plays, 53 yards, 2:55; Virginia Tech 16–14)
- (5:01) LOU – Keyjuan Brown 2-yard run (Cooper Ranvier kick) (Drive: 2 plays, 5 yards, 0:41; Louisville 21–16)

Fourth quarter

- (2:16) LOU – Keyjuan Brown 24-yard run (Cooper Ranvier kick) (Drive: 7 plays, 63 yards, 3:41; Louisville 28–16)

Statistics	LOU	VT
First downs	18	16
Plays–yards	62–371	64–240
Rushes–yards	34–235	40–164
Passing yards	136	76
Passing: comp–att–int	19–28–1	11–24–0
Turnovers	1	0
Time of possession	30:22	29:38

Team	Category	Player	Statistics
Louisville	Passing	Miller Moss	19/28, 136 yards, TD, INT
Louisville	Rushing	Isaac Brown	16 carries, 130 yards, TD
Louisville	Receiving	Chris Bell	8 receptions, 56 yards
Virginia Tech	Passing	Kyron Drones	11/24, 76 yards, TD
Virginia Tech	Rushing	Kyron Drones	14 carries, 85 yards, TD
Virginia Tech	Receiving	Ayden Greene	1 reception, 17 yards

=== at Florida State ===
Virginia Tech Hokies (3–6) at Florida State Seminoles (4–5) – game summary

Quarter	1	2	3	4	Total
Hokies	0	7	0	7	14
Seminoles	0	10	14	10	34

at Doak Campbell Stadium • Tallahassee, Florida

- Date: November 15
- Game time: 7:30 p.m. EST
- Game weather: Clear • Temperature: 63 °F (17 °C) • Wind: S at 6 mph
- Game attendance: 64,937
- Referee: Nate Black
- TV announcers (ACCN): Chris Cotter (play-by-play), Max Browne (analyst), and Tori Petry (sideline reporter)

Game information

First quarter

- No scoring plays

Second quarter

- FSU – Jake Weinberg 26-yard field goal, 10:56. Seminoles 3–0. Drive: 16 plays, 56 yards, 6:50.
- VT – Kyron Drones 4-yard run (John Love kick), 5:25. Hokies 7–3. Drive: 10 plays, 75 yards, 5:31.
- FSU – Duce Robinson 50-yard pass from Tommy Castellanos (Jake Weinberg kick), 3:11. Seminoles 10–7. Drive: 5 plays, 75 yards, 2:14.

Third quarter

- FSU – Tommy Castellanos 1-yard run (Jake Weinberg kick), 9:33. Seminoles 17–7. Drive: 13 plays, 63 yards, 5:20.
- FSU – Randy Pittman Jr. 1-yard run (Jake Weinberg kick), 0:54. Seminoles 24–7. Drive: 9 plays, 67 yards, 4:19.

Fourth quarter

- VT – Ayden Greene 8-yard pass from Kyron Drones (John Love kick), 11:20. Seminoles 24–14. Drive: 9 plays, 75 yards, 4:34.
- FSU – Tommy Castellanos 15-yard run (Jake Weinberg kick), 7:31. Seminoles 31–14. Drive: 7 plays, 61 yards, 3:41.
- FSU – Jake Weinberg 34-yard field goal, 4:12. Seminoles 34–14. Drive: 5 plays, 17 yards, 2:18.

Statistics	VT	FSU
First downs	20	27
Plays–yards	59–363	71–431
Rushes–yards	41–238	46–237
Passing yards	125	194
Passing: comp–att–int	10–18–1	13–25–0
Turnovers	2	0
Time of possession	27:25	32:35

Team	Category	Player	Statistics
Virginia Tech	Passing	Kyron Drones	10/18, 125 yards, TD, INT
Virginia Tech	Rushing	Marcellous Hawkins	12 carries, 101 yards
Virginia Tech	Receiving	Ayden Greene	2 receptions, 39 yards, TD
Florida State	Passing	Tommy Castellanos	12/24, 189 yards, TD
Florida State	Rushing	Ousmane Kromah	11 carries, 59 yards
Florida State	Receiving	Duce Robinson	6 receptions, 134 yards, TD

=== No. 13 Miami (FL) (rivalry) ===
No. 13 Miami Hurricanes (8–2) at Virginia Tech Hokies (3–7) – game summary

Quarter	1	2	3	4	Total
No. 13 Hurricanes	7	13	7	7	34
Hokies	3	0	7	7	17

at Lane Stadium • Blacksburg, Virginia

- Date: November 22
- Game time: 12:00 p.m. EST
- Game weather:
- Game attendance: 65,632
- Referee: Tim Hedgepeth
- TV announcers (ESPN): Bob Wischusen (play-by-play), Louis Riddick (analyst), and Kris Budden (sideline reporter)

Game information

First quarter

- MIA – Elija Lofton 20-yard pass from Carson Beck (Carter Davis kick), 10:16. Hurricanes 7–0. Drive: 8 plays, 75 yards, 4:44.
- VT – John Love 30-yard field goal, 6:18. Hurricanes 7–3. Drive: 8 plays, 48 yards, 3:52.

Second quarter

- MIA – Mark Fletcher Jr. 3-yard pass from Carson Beck (Carter Davis kick), 12:50. Hurricanes 14–3. Drive: 14 plays, 75 yards, 8:28.
- MIA – Carter Davis 46-yard field goal, 4:16. Hurricanes 17–3. Drive: 10 plays, 50 yards, 4:42.
- MIA – Carter Davis 40-yard field goal, 0:37. Hurricanes 20–3. Drive: 5 plays, 58 yards, 0:53.

Third quarter

- VT – Jeffrey Overton Jr. 38-yard run (John Love kick), 11:59. Hurricanes 20–10. Drive: 5 plays, 75 yards, 3:01.
- MIA – Girard Pingle Jr. 16-yard pass from Carson Beck (Carter Davis kick), 5:32. Hurricanes 27–10. Drive: 11 plays, 75 yards, 6:27.

Fourth quarter

- VT – William Watson III 3-yard run (John Love kick), 3:17. Hurricanes 27–17. Drive: 8 plays, 92 yards, 4:24.
- MIA – Malachi Toney 20-yard pass from Carson Beck (Carter Davis kick), 0:20. Hurricanes 34–17. Drive: 7 plays, 40 yards, 1:46.

Statistics	MIA	VT
First downs	22	20
Plays–yards	63–418	61–395
Rushes–yards	30–83	37–194
Passing yards	335	201
Passing: comp–att–int	28–33–0	14–24–0
Turnovers	0	1
Time of possession	33:29	26:31

Team	Category	Player	Statistics
Miami (FL)	Passing	Carson Beck	27/32, 320 yards, 4 TD
Miami (FL)	Rushing	Girard Pringle Jr.	14 carries, 49 yards
Miami (FL)	Receiving	Malachi Toney	12 receptions, 146 yards, TD
Virginia Tech	Passing	Kyron Drones	12/21, 124 yards
Virginia Tech	Rushing	Marcellous Hawkins	8 carries, 72 yards
Virginia Tech	Receiving	Ayden Greene	5 receptions, 95 yards

=== at No. 18 Virginia (rivalry) ===
Virginia Tech Hokies (3–8) at No. 18 Virginia Cavaliers (9–2) – game summary

Quarter	1	2	3	4	Total
Hokies	0	0	0	7	7
No. 18 Cavaliers	7	7	10	3	27

at Scott Stadium • Charlottesville, Virginia

- Date: November 29
- Game time: 7:00 p.m. EST
- Game weather: Clear, 34 °F (1 °C)
- Game attendance: 58,832
- Referee: Mike Roche
- TV announcers (ESPN): Mike Monaco (play-by-play), Kirk Morrison (analyst), and Dawn Davenport (sideline reporter)

Game information

First quarter

- UVA – J'Mari Taylor 1-yard run (Will Bettridge kick), 7:26. Cavaliers 7–0. Drive: 6 plays, 46 yards, 3:12.

Second quarter

- UVA – Sage Ennis 1-yard pass from J'Mari Taylor (Will Bettridge kick), 4:33. Cavaliers 14–0. Drive: 11 plays, 80 yards, 5:04.

Third quarter

- UVA – Will Bettridge 27-yard field goal, 7:28. Cavaliers 17–0. Drive: 11 plays, 39 yards, 3:40.
- UVA – Chandler Morris 8-yard run (Will Bettridge kick), 0:46. Cavaliers 24–0. Drive: 12 plays, 74 yards, 5:02.

Fourth quarter

- UVA – Will Bettridge 32-yard field goal, 6:24. Cavaliers 27–0. Drive: 6 plays, 22 yards, 2:52.
- VT – Shamarius Peterkin 57-yard pass from Kyron Drones (John Love kick), 4:21. Cavaliers 27–7. Drive: 5 plays, 75 yards, 2:03.

Statistics	VT	UVA
First downs	6	25
Plays–yards	47–197	83–380
Rushes–yards	31–119	47–197
Passing yards	78	183
Passing: comp–att–int	4–16–2	22–36–0
Turnovers	2	0
Time of possession	23:04	36:56

Team	Category	Player	Statistics
Virginia Tech	Passing	Kyron Drones	4/16, 78 yards, TD, 2 INT
Virginia Tech	Rushing	Jeffrey Overton Jr.	11 rushes, 53 yards
Virginia Tech	Receiving	Shamarius Peterkin	1 reception, 57 yards, TD
Virginia	Passing	Chandler Morris	21/35, 182 yards
Virginia	Rushing	J'Mari Taylor	20 rushes, 80 yards, TD
Virginia	Receiving	Kameron Courtney	6 receptions, 50 yards

== Personnel ==
=== Roster ===
2025 Virginia Tech Hokies football team roster
Players
Coaches
Offense

Pos.	#	Name	Class
WR	0	Ayden Greene	Jr
QB	1	Kyron Drones	Sr
WR	2	Takye Heath	So
RB	4	Jeremiah Coney	So
QB	5	William Watson III	So
WR	6	Keylen Adams	Fr
WR	7	Chanz Wiggins	Fr
RB	8	Terion Stewart	GS
WR	9	Cameron Seldon	Jr
WR	11	Isaiah Spencer	Jr
QB	12	Kelden Ryan	Fr
TE	13	Ja'Ricous Hairston	So
WR	15	Shamarius Peterkin	Fr
RB	16	Jeffrey Overton Jr.	Fr
QB	18	A. J. Brand	Fr
QB	19	Garret Rangel	Jr
RB	20	P. J. Prioleau	Sr
WR	21	Cam Sparks	Fr
WR	22	Micah Matthews	Fr
RB	23	Tyler Mason	Fr
RB	24	Braydon Bennett	GS
RB	27	Marcellous Hawkins	Jr
WR	28	Drew Hube	Fr
RB	35	John Buetow	Fr
OL	50	Nathaniel Wright	Fr
OL	51	Elijah Haughawout	Fr
OL	55	Tomas Rimac	Sr
OL	56	Layth Ghannan	So
OL	57	Lucas Austin	Fr
OL	58	Tommy Ricard	Fr
OL	62	Kyle Altuner	Fr
OL	63	Jaden Muskrat	GS
OL	66	Montavious Cunningham	Sr
OL	67	Hannes Hammer	So
OL	70	Carter Stallard	Fr
OL	71	Gavin Crawford	Fr
OL	76	Aidan Lynch	Fr
OL	77	Brody Meadows	Jr
OL	79	Johnny Garrett	Jr
WR	80	L.J. Booker	Fr
WR	81	Devin Alves	Jr
TE	82	Benji Gosnell	Jr
WR	83	Luke Stuewe	Fr
WR	85	Israel Hairston	Fr
WR	86	Joseph Hobbs	Fr
TE	87	Harrison Saint Germain	Jr
TE	88	Zeke Wimbush	So
WR	89	Charlie O'Connor	Fr
OL	91	Jahzari Priester	So
TE	99	Cole Reemsnyder	Jr

Defense

Pos.	#	Name	Class
S	0	Quinton Reddish	So
LB	3	Kaleb Spencer	Jr
CB	4	Krystian Williams	So
CB	5	Joshua Clarke	Fr
S	6	Jordan Bass	Jr
S	7	Sherrod Covil	Sr
CB	9	Isaiah Brown-Murray	Jr
S	11	Tyson Flowers	Jr
LB	12	Gabe Williams	Fr
DL	13	Kemari Copeland	Jr
S	14	Sheldon Robinson	Fr
S	15	Brennan Johnson	Fr
LB	16	Noah Chambers	Fr
CB	17	Caleb Brown	Sr
S	18	Isaiah Cash	GS
LB	19	Noah Jenkins	Fr
LB	20	Caleb Woodson	Jr
CB	21	Joseph Reddish	So
DL	22	Kelvin Gilliam Jr.	Sr
CB	23	Thomas Williams	So
LB	24	Jaden Keller	Sr
LB	26	Antwone Santiago	Jr
CB	28	Knahlij Harrell	Fr
CB	29	Jahmari DeLoatch	Fr
DL	31	Jason Abbey	So
DL	32	Deric Dandy	Fr
DL	33	Ben Bell	Sr
CB	34	Josh Jones	Fr
CB	35	Jojo Crim	Fr
LB	36	Brody Jones	So
LB	41	George Ballance	So
DL	42	Aycen Stevens	So
LB	44	Brett Clatterbaugh	Fr
LB	50	Darius Taylor	So
DL	52	Sherrod Henderson	Fr
LB	53	Will Johnson	GS
DL	54	Grant Karczewski	So
DL	55	Gerard Johnson	Fr
DL	57	James Jennette	Sr
DL	58	Zeke Chinwike	Fr
DL	88	Christian Evans	Fr
DL	90	Andrew Hanchuk	Fr
DL	92	Arias Nash	Sr
DL	94	Elhadj Fall	Jr
DL	97	Immanuel Hickman Sr.	GS
DL	98	Kody Huisman	Sr
DL	99	Emmett Laws	Fr

Special teams

Pos.	#	Name	Class
K	17	John Love	Jr
K	38	Kyle Lowe	GS
LS	46	Drew Doyle	Fr
K	49	Connor McLaughlin	Fr
K	92	Aidan Daugherty	Fr
P	93	Cole Byrd	Fr
P	95	Nick Veltsistas	Sr
LS	96	Christian Epling	Jr

Head coach

- Brent Pry
- Philip Montgomery
  Offensive coordinator/Interim HC

Coordinators/assistant coaches

- Sam Siefkes
  Defensive coordinator
- Stu Holt
  Special teams coordinator/offensive assistant
- J. C. Price
  Associate head coach/defensive line
- Derek Jones
  Defensive recruiting coordinator/cornerbacks
- Xavier Adibi
  Inside linebackers
- Matt Moore
  Offensive line
- Shawn Quinn
  Outside linebackers
- Elijah Brooks
  Running backs
- Pierson Prioleau
  Safeties
- Brent Davis
  Tight Ends
- Brian Crist
  Co-quarterbacks
- Jeron Gouveia-Winslow
  Associate safeties
- Mike Moyseenko
  Associate tight ends
- Brayden DeVault-Smith
  Assistant cornerbacks/quality control
- Jan Johnson Jr.
  Assistant defensive line/quality control
- Jens Danielsen
  Assistant offensive line
- Cannon Montgomery
  Assistant running backs
- Brandon McCombs
  Assistant special teams/specialist
- Cam Phillips
  Assistant wide receivers/quality control
- Jireh Wilson
  Edges
- Bryan Whitehead
  Nickels

Legend

- (C) Team captain
- (S) Suspended
- (I) Ineligible
- Injured
- Redshirt

Roster
Last update: December 5, 2025

=== Transfers ===
Rankings and Stats by 247 Sports

Outgoing Player	Pos	Rk	Ht	Wt	Destination
Braelin Moore	IOL	93	6'3	303	LSU Tigers
Bob Schick	IOL	85	6'6	304	Oklahoma State Cowboys
Gunner Givens	IOL	84	6'5	322	Vanderbilt Commodores
Lance Williams	IOL	83	6'3	310	Appalachian State Mountaineers
Caleb Nitta	IOL	NR	6'2	297	Western Kentucky Hilltoppers
Xavier Chaplin	OT	95	6'7	323	Auburn Tigers
Web Davidson	OT	85	6'6	300	Samford Bulldogs
Griffin Duggan	OT	83	6'5	295	Old Dominion Monarchs
Xayvion Turner-Bradshaw	WR	87	6'0	172	Marshall Thundering Herd
Marcell Baylor	WR	86	6'3	195	TBD
Chance Fitzgerald	WR	85	6'2	191	Vanderbilt Commodores
Jordan Tapscott	WR	NR	6'1	170	Shepherd University Rams
Malachi Thomas	RB	85	6'0	215	Purdue Boilermakers
Davi Belfort	QB	82	5'11	196	UCF Knights
Ben Locklear	QB	79	6'6	251	TBD
Jackson Sigler	QB	NR	6'1	203	Shepherd University Rams
Khurtiss Perry	DL	86	6'2	280	Jacksonville State Gamecocks
Malachi Madison	DL	84	6'3	289	UMass Minutemen
CJ McCray	DE	85	6'4	251	Cincinnati Bearcats
Ishmael Findlayter	DE	80	6'4	260	Duquesne Dukes
Jorden McDonald	DE	80	6'4	217	William & Mary Tribe
Sam Brumfield	LB	86	5'11	225	Memphis Tigers
Keli Lawson	LB	86	6'6	220	UCF Knights
Jayden McDonald	LB	86	6'4	232	UCF Knights
Josh Hand	LB	NR	6'1	230	Tennessee Tech Golden Eagles
Mansoor Delane	CB	91	6'1	187	LSU Tigers
Miles Ellis	CB	NR	5'11	170	Sacred Heart Pioneers
Jonathan Pennix	CB	84	6'0	178	Southern Miss Golden Eagles
Jalen Stroman	SF	87	6'1	200	Notre Dame Fighting Irish
Cameren Fleming	SF	87	6'0	202	Appalachian State Mountaineers
Mose Phillips III	SF	86	6'2	193	Missouri Tigers
Braylon Johnson	SF	83	6'1	185	Wake Forest Demon Deacons
Stephon Hicks	SF	NR	6'0	209	William & Mary Tribe

Incoming Player	Pos	Rk	Ht	Wt	Yr	#	Previous school
Kyle Altuner	IOL	88	6'3	288	rFr	62	West Virginia
Tomas Rimac	IOL	86	6'6	318	rSr	55	West Virginia
Gavin Crawford	IOL	86	6'3	330	So?	57	West Virginia
Jaden Muskrat	IOL	85	6'3	312	Gr	63	Auburn
Lucas Austin	OT	85	6'6	287	rFr	57	West Virginia
Donavon Greene	WR	86	6'2	210	Gr	3	Wake Forest
Isaiah Spencer	WR	NR	6'2	185	So		Jackson State
Cameron Seldon	RB	89	6'2	222	Jr	9	Tennessee
Braydon Bennett	RB	86	6'2	215	Gr	24	Coastal Carolina
Terion Stewart	RB	86	5'9	220			Bowling Green
Marcellous Hawkins	RB	85	5'11	210	Sr	27	Central Missouri
Garret Rangel	QB	84	6'2	205			Oklahoma State
Drew Doyle	LS	NR	6'1	250	NA	98	Iowa State
Kody Huisman	DL	87	6'4	289	rSr	50	North Dakota State
Arias Nash	DL	87	6'1	275	Sr	92	Mercer
Elhadj Fall	DL	85	6'3	290	Jr	94	Georgia Southern
Jahzari Priester	DL	85	6'8	250	rSo	95	Hampton
James Djonkam	DE	86	6'3	245	Gr	66	Eastern Michigan
Ben Bell	DE	86	6'2	255	5th	33	Texas State
Immanuel Hickman	DE	NR	6'3	296	Sr	6	UCF
Michael Short	LB	86	6'3	230			North Carolina
Jordan Bass	LB	85	6'4	230	Jr	6	Pittsburgh
Antwone Santiago	LB	84	6'3	225	rJr	23	Temple
Caleb Brown	CB	85	6'1	160	Sr	13	Hawaii
Isaiah Brown-Murray	CB	85	5'10	191	rJr	26	East Carolina
Joseph Reddish	CB	85	6'0	190			Wingate
Tyson Flowers	SF	87	5'11	211	rJr	17	Rice
Sherrod Covil Jr.	SF	86	5'11	200	Sr	7	Clemson
Isaiah Cash	SF	86	6'0	195	Gr	18	Sam Houston
Christian Ellis	SF	85	6'0	202	Sr	8	New Mexico

=== 2026 NFL draft ===
Round	Pick	Player	Position	NFL team
		TBD		
