= Colored music notation =

Technique used in music education

Colored music notation is a technique used to facilitate enhanced learning in young music students by adding visual color to written musical notation. It is based upon the concept that color can affect the observer in various ways, and combines this with standard learning of basic notation.

== Basis ==
Viewing color has been widely shown to change an individual's emotional state and stimulate neurons. The Lüscher color test observes from experiments that when individuals are required to contemplate pure red for varying lengths of time, [the experiments] have shown that this color decidedly has a stimulating effect on the nervous system; blood pressure increases, and respiration rate and heart rate both increase. Pure blue, on the other hand, has the reverse effect; observers experience a decline in blood pressure, heart rate, and breathing. Given these findings, it has been suggested that the influence of colored musical notation would be similar.

== Music education ==
In music education, color is typically used in method books to highlight new material. Stimuli received through several senses excite more neurons in several localized areas of the cortex, thereby reinforcing the learning process and improving retention. This information has been proven by other researchers; Chute (1978) reported that "elementary students who viewed a colored version of an instructional film scored significantly higher on both immediate and delayed tests than did students who viewed a monochrome version".

== Color studies ==
=== Effect on achievement ===
A researcher in this field, George L. Rogers is the Director of Music Education at Westfield State College. He is also the author of 25 articles in publications that include the Music Educators Journal, The Instrumentalist, and the Journal of Research in Music Education. In 1991, George L. Rogers did a study that researched the effect of color-coded notation on music achievement of elementary instrumental students. Rogers states that the color-coded notation used in this study was not meant to replace the present notational system; rather, it was intended as a pedagogical aid for beginners.

The subjects used for this study were 92 fifth- and sixth-grade beginner wind instrument players who attended two different schools. The experimental group used color-coded method books and supplementary materials in which each different pitch was highlighted with a different color using felt-tip markers. The control group used identical materials, but with the notation uncolored. The students were then tested in three different parts:

1. Students performed a 26-note melody from memory (The materials were presented either in color or uncolored notation).
2. Students sight-read two 12-note melodies (One melody was presented in color-coded notation, the other uncolored. The students were then asked which notation was easier to play).
3. Students named the letter names of the notes in two 7-note melodies.

The results of this study are as follows: Subjects in the experimental and control groups performed much the same on the task of playing music from memory. For the task of sight-reading, the experimental group scored higher than did the control group. However, the control group (without color-coded notation) scored higher when sight-reading uncolored notation. In fact, the students who learned using color-coded notation scored significantly lower when sight-reading plain notation.

A possible theory regarding these results is that the students in the experimental group memorized the colors instead of the notation. The third task of note naming seemed to be less of a challenge for the control group who learned to read notation than the experimental group who learned which color is which fingering on their instrument. In regards to which type of notation was easier to read, in the experimental group all but three found the color-coded notation easier to play, in the control group 18 out of the 46 chose color-coded notation also easier to read. This is a deviation from standard findings, as most students prefer the method they were first introduced to.

=== Effect on music-reading skills ===
In 1996, Rogers did another study researching the effect of colored rhythmic notation on the music-reading skills of elementary students. Rogers states that the purpose of studying the effect of colored rhythmic notation was to determine if instruction involving the addition of color to standard rhythmic notation would affect the performance of elementary music students on the task of clapping and vocalizing rhythmic exercises on sight. The subjects of this study were 134 first- and second-grade general music students. The two particular schools involved in the experiment were chosen because most students attending were dealing with notation intensively for the first time.

The experimental subjects participated in vocalizing and clapping rhythms notated with colored chalk on the chalkboard as a regular part of general music classes. Control subjects read, vocalized and clapped identical rhythms noted in white chalk. In the experimental group, contrasting colors were used to notate the different rhythmic values. The colors used were arbitrary and changed from week to week (so no one color was identified with a particular note or rest).

The students used the Cheve rhythm syllables, consisting of ta’s for quarter notes and ti-ti’s for eighth notes. The students were tested by sight-reading two exercises from a chalkboard and clapping and vocalizing the rhythmic notation. One test was in colored rhythmic notation and the other was uncolored. The students performed the two exercises involving similar rhythms, with colored notation being applied randomly to either the first or second task.

The results of this study are as follows: Students in both experimental and control groups scored well, with a combined mean for all subjects of 10.66 out of 12 points. Students who experienced colored rhythmic notation during the treatment period scored somewhat higher as a group on both tasks.

=== Special needs students ===
Students who need academic assistance are often students who have learning disorders. Kent Gerlach clarifies some of the symptoms of learning disorders, and establishes that certain difficulties arise, particularly with the following:

- Poor visual memory – forgetting what has been seen or read.
- Poor visual discrimination, especially when distinguishing between squares and rectangles, circles and ovals, the letters m, r, h, n, r, p, b, d, g, and q, and the numbers 6 and 9, 21 and 12.
- Poor figure ground – difficulty selecting one thing from a group, such as a particular letter in a word or word in a sentence.

Rogers found that during the 1991 study on the effects of color-coded notation on music achievement of elementary instrumental students that:

The high level of dependence on color-coding among learning disabled and mentally handicapped students may reflect a situation similar to that reported by Chute in which students of different ability levels were affected differently by the presence or absence of color in instructional materials. Not only did the learning-disabled and mentally handicapped students in the experimental group score much higher on the tasks that involved color-coded notation than on the uncolored notation, but it also appeared that the color-coded notation enabled them to score as high as or higher than the other students"

He suggests that the scores of students identified as receiving extra academic assistance were examined separately and were found to be lower than the overall student sample, but were otherwise similar to the means for all students.

== Findings ==
As a result of these experiments, colored notation does seem to help early music students to learn notation and rhythms more than students with uncolored notation. In Rogers' 1991 study of color-coded notation, it is clear that students relied more heavily on the colors that were assigned to the notation, rather than on learning the notation. However, as the students were able to easily tell the different notes apart, perhaps by using different colors that are not assigned to a note, the experimental students would have been able to read not only the colored notation better but also the uncolored notation. Rogers did change the second study, in 1996, making the colors arbitrary. While the obvious disadvantage of memorization from the 1991 study exists, the overall findings of the study were that colored musical notation is an inexpensive and effective tool when used with young music students.
