= Chevé =

Chevé is a surname. Notable people with the surname include:

- Émile-Joseph-Maurice Chevé (1804–1864), French music theorist and educator
- Jacqueline Chevé (1961–2010), French politician

== See also ==
- Chevé Cave, one of the deepest caves on Earth
- Cheves
