= Cheves =

Cheves may refer to:

== People ==
=== Surname ===
- Buck Cheves (1898–1995), American college football player and referee
- Elizabeth W. Cheves (1809–1890), American writer
- Joe Cheves (1918–2007), American professional golfer
- Langdon Cheves (1776–1857), American politician, lawyer and businessman
- Monnie T. Cheves (1902–1988), American professor and politician
- Patrick Cheves (1820–1883), American politician

=== Given name ===
- Cheves Perky (1874–1940), American psychologist
- Cheves Walling (1916–2007), American organic chemist

=== Middle name ===
- Alexander Cheves Haskell (1839–1910), American officer of the Confederate Army and politician in South Carolina
- Emma Cheves Wilkins (1870–1956), American painter

== Other uses ==
- Battery Cheves, a historic artillery battery in South Carolina, U.S.

== See also ==
- Virgil Cheeves (1901–1979), American baseball player
