= Brunswick City School District =

School district in Medina County, Ohio, United States

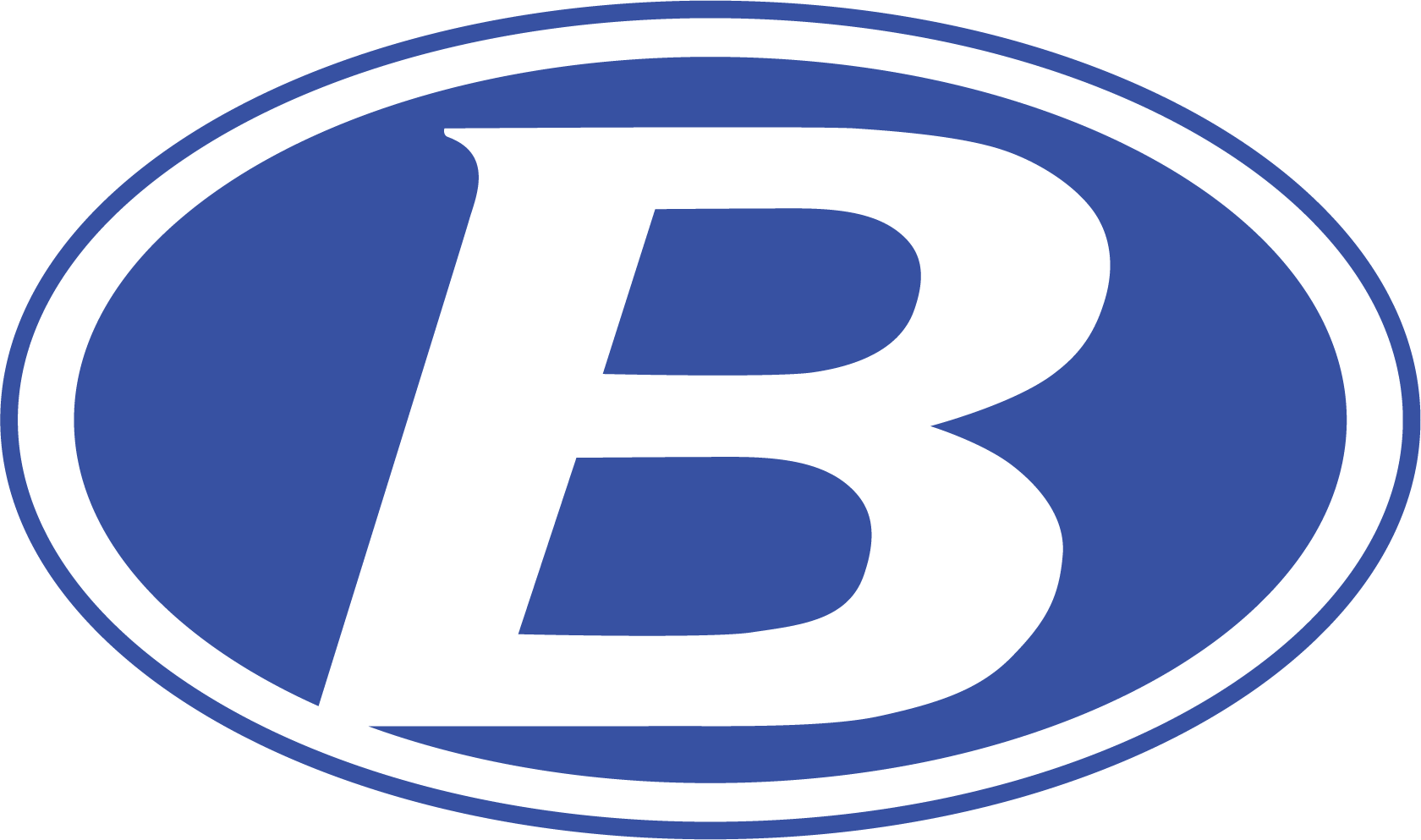

Location
- Brunswick, Ohio United States

District information
- Type: Public
- Motto: Journey of a Blue Devil
- Grades: Preschool - 12
- Established: 1960; 66 years ago
- Superintendent: Jason Niedermeyer
- Asst. superintendent(s): Kathleen Verhest
- Schools: 8
- Budget: $100,233,000 (2021-2022)
- NCES District ID: 3904366

Students and staff
- Students: 6,023
- Teachers: 338.30
- Staff: 814.20
- Student–teacher ratio: 17.80
- Athletic conference: Greater Cleveland Conference
- District mascot: Bluey
- Colors: Blue & White

Other information
- Website: www.bcsoh.org

The Brunswick City School District is a school district in the city of Brunswick, as well as most parts of Brunswick Hills Township, and some parts of Hinckley, Ohio. The district has six elementary schools, a middle school, and a high school.

== Schools ==
=== High school (9-12) ===
- Brunswick High School (New one is being built, opening for the start of the 2027–2028 school year)

=== Middle school (6-8) ===
- Brunswick Middle School

=== Elementary schools (K-5) ===
- Applewood Elementary School
- Crestview Elementary School
- Hickory Ridge Elementary School
- Huntington Elementary School
- Kidder Elementary School (PK-5)
- Memorial Elementary School

=== Former schools ===
- Edwards Middle School
- Towslee Elementary School
- Visintainer Middle School
- Willetts Middle School
