= Natalie Sideserf =

American artist, teacher and celebrity chef

- Born: Natalie Marie Elliott; January 7, 1985 (age 41); Brunswick, Ohio, U.S.
- Education: Ohio State University
- Occupation: Owner of Sideserf Cake Studio
- Spouse: David Sideserf (m. 2012)

Natalie Marie Sideserf (née Elliott; born on January 7, 1985) is an American artist, teacher and chef specializing in hyper-realistic cake sculpting techniques. Sideserf has received national and global acclaim for her realistic designs. In 2014, Food Network declared Sideserf as "one of the most talented young cake artists in the country at the forefront of realistic cake decorating."

Born in Brunswick, Ohio, she holds a bachelor's degree in Fine Arts with a concentration in painting from The Ohio State University.

Natalie has participated in Buddy vs. Duff seasons 2 and 3 on Duff Goldman's team.

== Willie Nelson Bust Cake ==
Considered by Sideserf as her breakout opportunity, her submission of a bust made in the likeness of country music singer Willie Nelson won best in a show at a cake competition hosted in Austin, Texas. When her brother posted an image of the cake to Reddit, it reached number-one on February 23, garnering over 98.2B views.

== Severed Heads Wedding Cake ==
In October 2013, just eight months after receiving global attention from the Willie Nelson cake, Sideserf took on a much darker subject as a follow-up: the severed heads of herself and her groom-to-be. “I was heavily influenced by the Halloween season, my husband's love for horror movies, and the venue which was the Alamo Drafthouse Cinema,” she told FoxNews.com in an email. “While we do a vast array of different cake designs for our customers, hyperrealism has been one of my favorite subjects so the thought of doing our severed heads was a no-brainer (no pun intended).” The cake was featured on Season 4 Episode 40 of ABC's The Chew.

== Sideserf Cake Studio ==
Sideserf Cake Studio is located in Austin, Texas and is the first bakery to coin the term "Cake Studio", putting an emphasis on the artistry of decorating and design as opposed to traditional bakeries. Clients have included Austin-centric events like the Moontower Comedy Festival and SXSW as well as celebrities like American Idol judge Keith Urban, Ray Benson of Asleep At The Wheel, Big Freedia, and others. Her husband, Dave, has quit his day job to support Sideserf in her business. In December 2023, she revealed that she was expecting her first child, a daughter, with her husband Dave.

== Texas Cake House ==
In 2017, Natalie and her husband Dave Sideserf became hosts of Texas Cake House on Food Network. The series highlights Sideserf Cake Studio and the incredibly realistic, sculpted cakes Natalie painstakingly creates for clients using her fine art background. In this series, Natalie and Dave give an intimate, behind-the-scenes look at what it takes to run a successful business with a spouse. The show currently has 2 seasons.

== Appearances ==
- "Baked on the Waterfront", Duff Takes The Cake (June 2020)
- Cake-O-Phobia, Nailed It (May 2019)
- Pickler & Ben, CMT (January 2018)
- Fabulous Food Show, Cleveland, Ohio (November 2015)
- Outrageous Halloween, Food Network (October 2015)
- I Want That Wedding, Channel 5 (United Kingdom) (September 2015)
- Duff Till Dawn, Food Network (March 2015)
- Ripley's Believe It Or Not!: Reality Shock, Ripley Publishing (September 2014)
- Stan Winston School of Character Arts (June 2014)
- The Chew (November 2013)
- American Idol (November 2013)
- Galileo, Germany (June 2013)
