= Larry Asante =

American football player (born 1988)

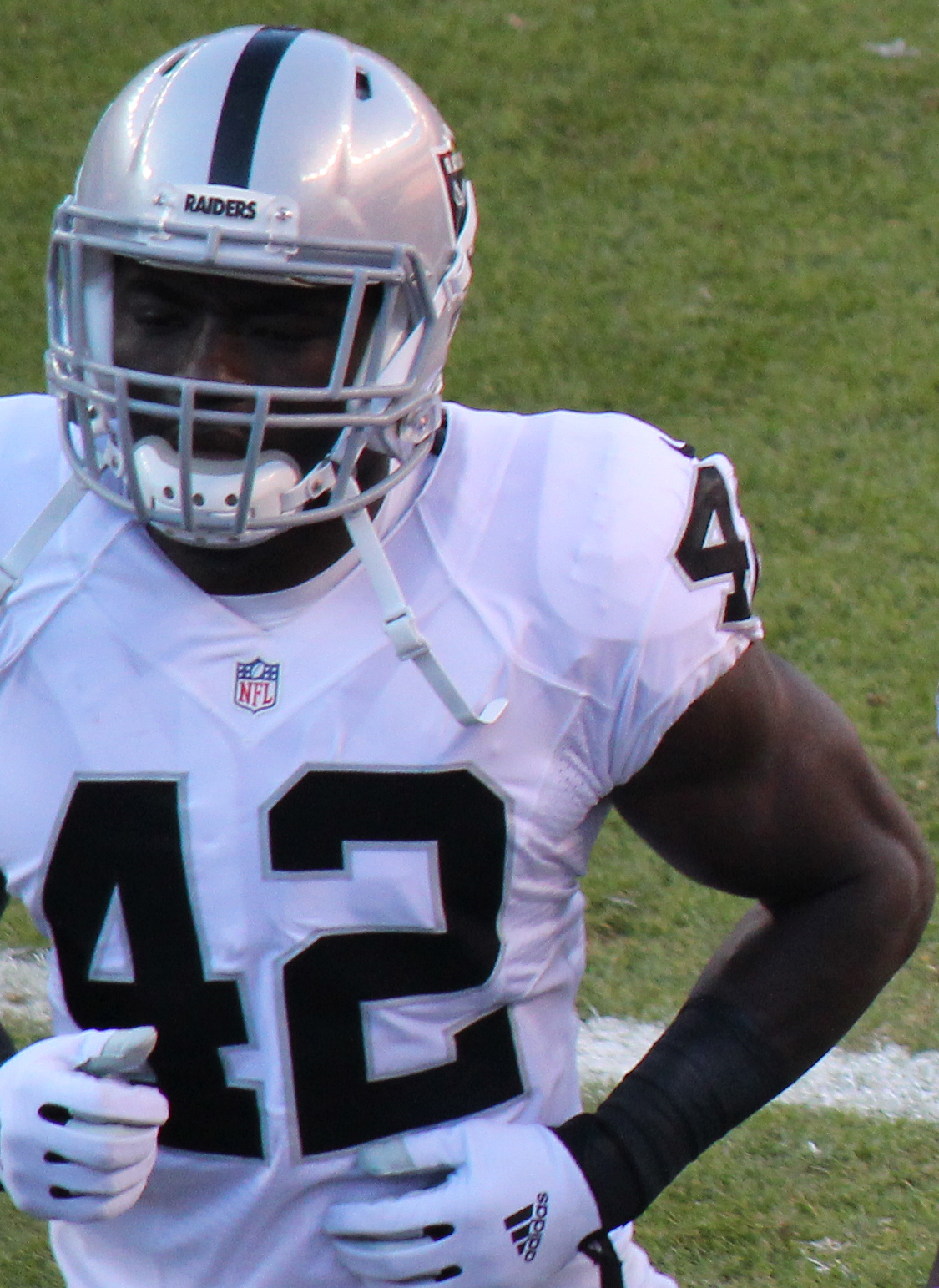
- Asante with the Oakland Raiders in 2015

No. 22, 25, 42
- Position: Safety

Personal information
- Born: March 7, 1988 (age 38); Compton, California, U.S.
- Listed height: 6 ft 0 in (1.83 m)
- Listed weight: 211 lb (96 kg)

Career information
- High school: Hayfield (Alexandria, Virginia)
- College: Coffeyville (2005–2006); Nebraska (2007–2009)
- NFL draft: 2010: 5th round, 160th overall pick

Career history
- Cleveland Browns (2010)*; Tampa Bay Buccaneers (2010–2011); Indianapolis Colts (2013); Oakland Raiders (2014–2015)
- * Offseason or practice squad member only

Career NFL statistics
- Total tackles: 68
- Forced fumbles: 2
- Pass deflections: 4
- Interceptions: 1
- Stats at Pro Football Reference

Larry Gibbs Asante (born March 7, 1988) is an American former professional football player who was a safety in the National Football League (NFL). He was selected by the Cleveland Browns in the fifth round of the 2010 NFL draft. He played college football for the Nebraska Cornhuskers.

== Early life ==
Asante was born in Compton, California. He attended both Annandale High School in Annandale, VA and then the Hayfield Secondary School outside Alexandria, Virginia, where he earned all-league honors as a running back in the AAA Patriot Division.

== College career ==
=== Coffeyville Community College ===
Asante registered 76 tackles, 11 tackles for loss, three blocked kicks and an interception as a linebacker at Coffeyville Community College.

=== Nebraska ===
Asante entered the 2007 season at the University of Nebraska–Lincoln as the Cornhuskers' starting strong safety after transitioning from linebacker in the spring. He played in twelve games, starting ten of them.

Asante started twelve games of the thirteen he played in 2008. He finished the 2008 season as Nebraska's second-leading tackler with 67 tackles, including 45 solo tackles. He made at least five tackles in eight games, led by a career-high 13 stops at Oklahoma.

Asante finished his last year at Nebraska with a career-high 79 tackles, including 42 solo stops. He forced two fumbles and recorded two interceptions, one of which he returned for a touchdown. He started all 14 games in 2009 for a unit that led the nation in scoring defense and pass efficiency defense. He was selected to the first-team All-Big 12 team by conference coaches and Rival.com.

== Professional career ==
=== Cleveland Browns ===
The Cleveland Browns selected Asante in the fifth round (160th overall) in the 2010 NFL draft.

Asante and the Browns agreed to a four-year contract worth about $1.96 million on July 16, 2010.

Asante was waived by the Browns on September 4, 2010.

On September 5, 2010 Asante was signed to the Browns practice squad.

=== Tampa Bay Buccaneers ===
Asante was signed off the Tampa Bay Buccaneers practice squad after a season-ending injury to starting rookie Cody Grimm. He appeared in the final two games of the 2010 season, recording an interception against Drew Brees in the season finale against the New Orleans Saints. He was released on August 30, 2012.

=== Indianapolis Colts ===
Asante signed a reserve/future contract with the Indianapolis Colts on December 31, 2012.

=== Oakland Raiders ===
Asante signed with the Oakland Raiders on August 6, 2014.

== Personal life ==
Asante has three children. His younger brother Eugene plays college football for the Auburn Tigers.
