= Brunswick High School (Ohio) =

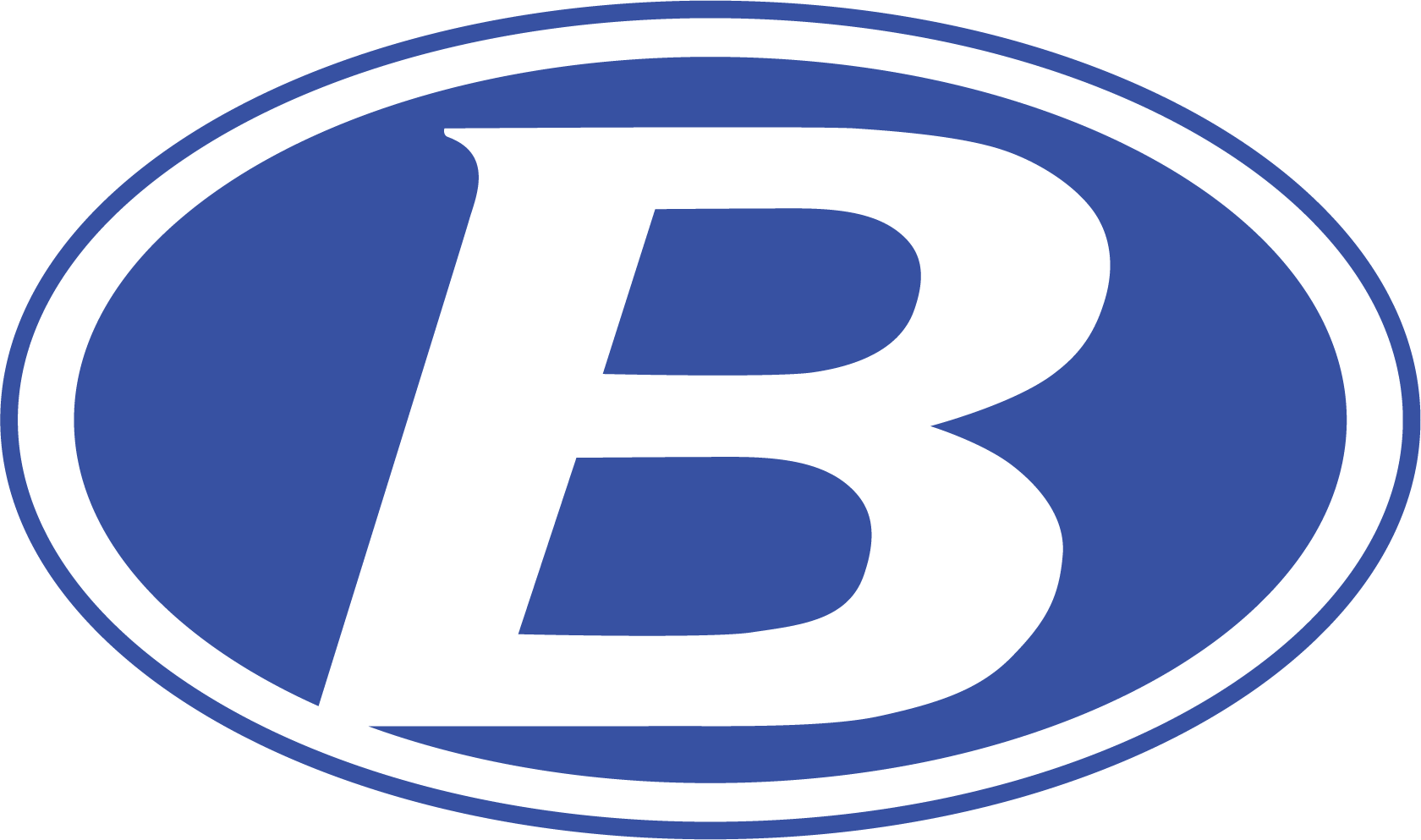

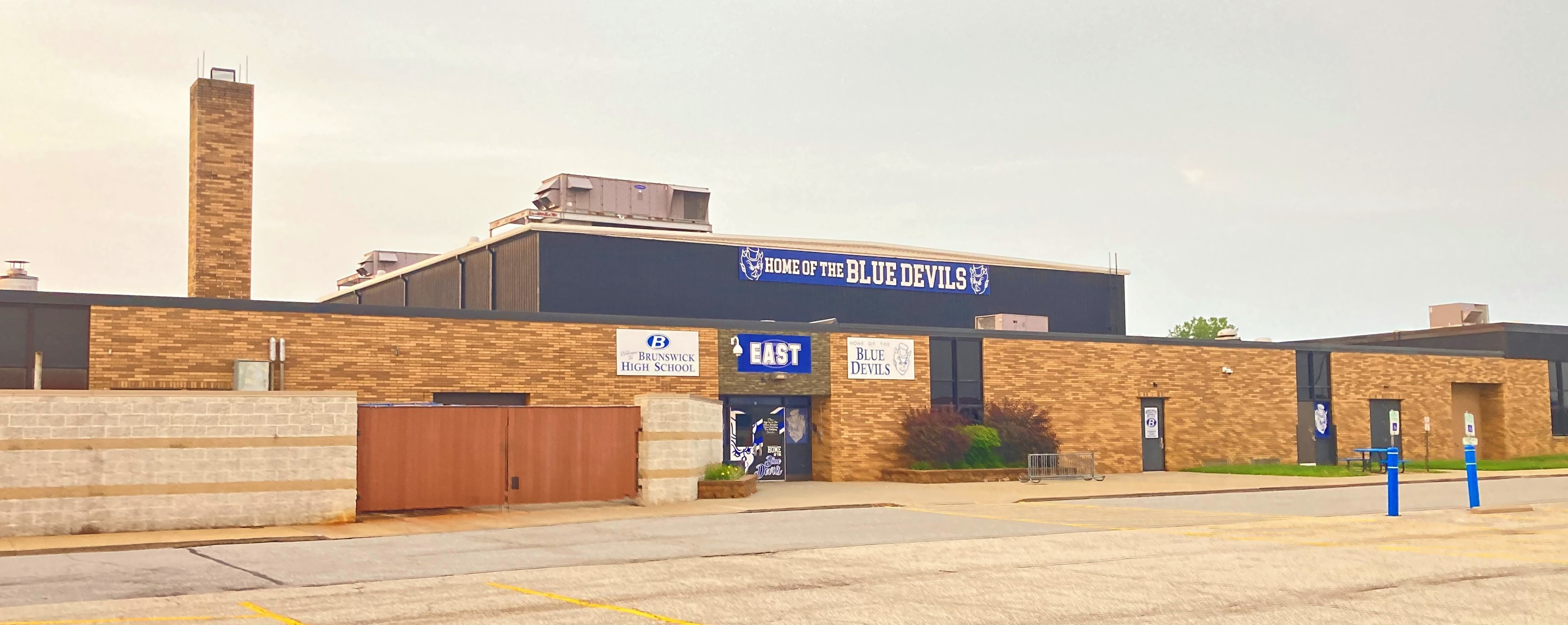

Location
- 3581 Center Road; Brunswick, Ohio 44212; USA; 41.2418°N 81.8155°W

Information
- Type: Public
- Motto: "Let's Go Big Blue"
- Opened: 1967
- School district: Brunswick City Schools
- Principal: Keith Merrill
- Staff: 91.00 (on an FTE basis)
- Enrollment: 1,984 (2023-2024)
- Student to teacher ratio: 21.80
- Colors: Royal Blue and White
- Athletics conference: Greater Cleveland Conference
- Mascot: Blue Devils
- Rivals: Medina Battling Bees; Strongsville Mustangs
- Website: bhs.bcsoh.org

Brunswick High School (BHS) is a public high school in Brunswick, Ohio. It is the only high school in the Brunswick City School District and the only high school in the city. Brunswick High School offers a comprehensive educational program consisting of ten Advanced Placement Courses and Honors-Level programming in all academic areas. A wide range of co-curricular and extra-curricular clubs, activities, and athletics supplement the academic programs at Brunswick High School. As of 2015, Brunswick has 132 teachers and 2,500 students. It is the seventh largest high school in Ohio in terms of enrollment.

== Information ==
Brunswick High's school colors are royal blue and white and the school mascot is the Blue Devil. It is currently a member of the Greater Cleveland Conference. Brunswick was previously a member of the former Pioneer Conference. BHS sports include football, soccer, swimming, gymnastics, basketball, baseball, softball, wrestling, cheerleading, track, cross country, volleyball, golf, tennis, hockey, lacrosse, bowling and rugby.

Brunswick High School also has band, orchestra, choir, and theater departments. The marching band was invited to the 2020 London New Year's Parade by the (former) Deputy Lord Mayor of Westminster Robert Davis.

The school is one story with three houses; the West (primarily freshman), Center (all) and East (sophomores, juniors, and seniors). BHS has two gymnasiums and two cafeterias (East and West). Due to water damage, the gym floor in the East gym was completely replaced in early 2011. Behind the school is located a turf athletic field with a 1/4-mile track around it (newly renovated in 2011) used for football, soccer, rugby, and lacrosse, as well as a baseball field. In 2027 to 2028 a new high school will open in place of the old one.

Beginning in the 2008–2009 school year, the auto, metal and wood shop classes were removed from the school. These rooms were converted to computer labs. Technology classes are primarily located in the West house. Foreign language classes are in the Center house. The school has an art wing with 4 art studios (located in the East house). There are 8 computer labs (not including the student center), one of which is dedicated as a classroom. The school's student center no longer functions as a library. Instead, tables have been added and is used more as an "internet café" for study hall students. The student center also hosts a distance learning lab that connects electronically to the University of Akron for PSEOP students.

At the end of the 2010 school year a SMART Board was added in every classroom to replace the chalk and white boards. All desktops were removed from the teachers' desks and every teacher received an HP Pro Book for their room. Some classrooms still have 2 desktop computers for student use.

In the 2011–2012 school year security was increased in the building with the addition of new security cameras and magnetic locks installed on exterior doors, allowing exterior doors to be unlocked during class changes and locked automatically after. Building wide Wi-Fi was also added for student use on school-given computers, but is not available for individual cell phone usage. BHS is also experimenting with textbook free classes, loaning students MacBook Airs to use in the classroom and to complete classwork assignments at home (online, in lieu of going to the classroom). At the current time this school does not use textbooks in math classes. All other classes use textbooks.

== Ohio High School Athletic Association State championships ==
- Boys Track and Field – 1998
- Boys Cross Country – 1999
- Girls Softball – 1986
- Girls Cross Country - 2011

=== Other non-Sanctioned sports championships ===
- Boys Rugby - 2017, 2018

== Notable alumni ==
- Clay Pickering, former NFL wide receiver. He transferred after his junior season
- Tomas Rimac, college football offensive guard
