= Elizabeth W. Cheves =

American writer of prose and verse (1809–1890)

Elizabeth Washington Cheves
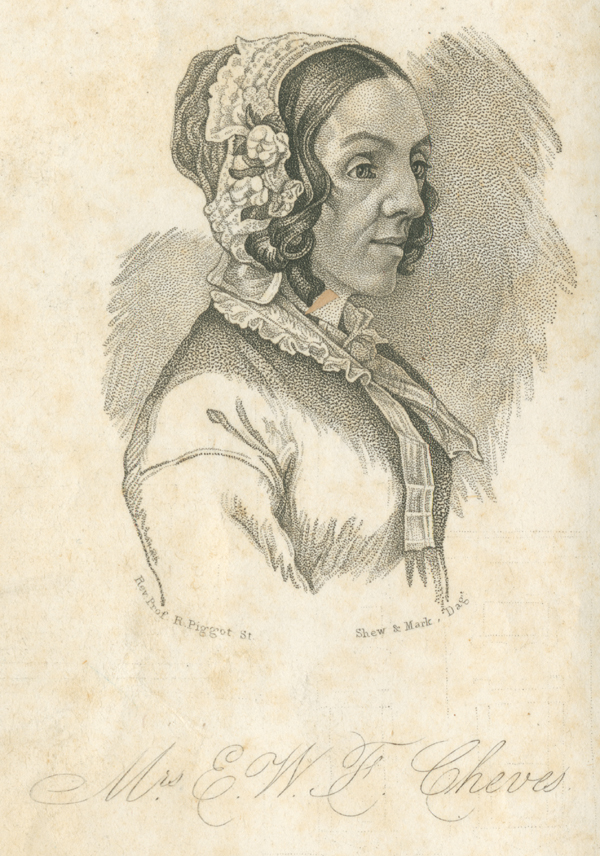
- Portrait of Elizabeth Cheves, from the frontispiece of Sketches in Prose and Verse
- Born: Elizabeth Washington Foote; December 23, 1809; Eastern Virginia
- Died: March 21, 1890 (aged 80)
- Occupation: Author
- Known for: Sketches in Prose and Verse
- Spouse: F. Thornton Cheves

Elizabeth Washington Cheves (née Foote; December 23, 1809 – March 21, 1890) was an American writer of prose and verse in Virginia.

Cheves was a native of eastern Virginia, the fourth child of Richard Foote and Helen Gibbon Stuart. Of Cornish extraction, she was named for an aunt of her father, a friend of George Washington and owner and resident of Hayfield, Fairfax County, Virginia. When she was five years old, her mother died. Her father remarried but his second wife also predeceased him.

Consequently, much of her education was left to her father to arrange. Initially instructed by a tutor, at the age of twelve she began instructing herself in further subjects to which she had yet to be introduced. Described as an "unusually intelligent and curious child," she studied drawing, painting, Latin, and French, and began to write poetry.

In 1830, she married physician F. Thornton Cheves, a native of Caroline County, Virginia; at his death in 1844 she was left with little money to support herself and her children. Consequently, in 1849, she published a volume of Sketches in Prose and Verse. The book bears a dedication to U.S. President Zachary Taylor.
