= Hayfield Secondary School =

Secondary school in Fairfax County, Virginia, United States

Location
- 7630 Telegraph Road; Alexandria, Virginia 22315; United States; 38°45′00″N 77°08′40″W

Information
- School type: Public, Secondary School
- Motto: Birds Fly, Hawks Soar
- Founded: April 20, 1968; 58 years ago
- School district: Fairfax County Public Schools
- Principal: Antonio DiBari
- Teaching staff: 169.53 (FTE)
- Grades: 7–12
- Enrollment: 3,239 (2023-2024)
- Student to teacher ratio: 19.11
- Campus: Suburban
- Color: Orange White Grey
- Mascot: Hawk
- Feeder schools: Gunston Elementary School; Hayfield Elementary School; Island Creek Elementary School; Lane Elementary School; Lorton Station Elementary; Rose Hill Elementary School
- Website: www.fcps.edu/HayfieldSS

Hayfield Secondary School is a secondary school (grades 7–12) in the Fairfax County Public Schools system of Virginia. It opened in 1968 and graduated its first senior class in 1971.

== History ==
The land on which Hayfield Secondary sits was historically part of George Washington's Mount Vernon estate. Because of a small natural spring underneath the school, the land served as a hay field. After Washington, the land itself changed hands numerous times.

=== 20th century ===
In 1956, developers constructed the nearby Hayfield Farm Community, the first of many housing developments in the region. Hayfield Secondary opened its doors to middle school (7th and 8th grade) students and then to 9th and 10th grade students during the 1968–1969 school year, while still under construction. Floyd W. Worley was the first principal.

The school is erroneously mentioned in Remember the Titans as being "all white." While at the time of the desegregation of T.C. Williams High School in Alexandria, Virginia, a large majority of Hayfield's students were white, it was racially integrated from the day of its first opening in 1968, drawing the majority of its students of color from the children of military men and women at nearby Fort Belvoir, home to the U.S. Army Corps of Engineers. The desegregation encouraging word "diversity" even headed a section of the 1973 yearbook, the fifth volume of the "Harvester."

As the region that the school serves grew, overcrowding became a major issue at Hayfield. By the late 1990s, the school routinely exceeded its intended capacity with over 4000 students.

=== 21st century ===
A renovation of the school began in 2002 and was completed in 2005. Further helping to relieve the pressure on Hayfield was the opening of South County Secondary School, also in 2005. However, due to overcrowding at South County in its second year of operation and under-utilized capacity at Hayfield, Hayfield accommodated more students again from a boundary change with South County approved for the 2007–2008 school year.

In 2022, the school's varsity boys basketball team completed a perfect season (32-0) and beat Battlefield High School, 67-47, in the Virginia High School League Class 6 State Championship. This was the school's first state title in basketball.

In 2023, the school's varsity boys basketball team won a back-to-back Virginia High School League Class 6 State Championship. Hayfield beat Patriot High School 52-41.

== Academics ==
Hayfield is a secondary school, meaning it serves grades 7 through 12, but the high school and middle school students are generally kept separated. The middle school has an honors program and the high school offers both honors and Advanced Placement courses. As of Spring 2007, the number of exams on which a score of 3 or higher was achieved (on a scale of 1–5) rose to 57% from 46% the previous year, the best results found on record for Hayfield.

Hayfield has an It's Academic Team and a Robotics Team that has been in the FIRST Robotics Competition (FRC). Hayfield's Varsity Science Olympiad team competes in several regional tournaments. The school competes in the Intel International Science and Engineering Fair. The school is home to a Latin Club which is part of the Junior Latin Classical League.

Hayfield also has an orchestra, a band and a choral group.

== Athletics ==
Hayfield's high school teams compete in the 6A National District of the 6A Occoquan Region of the Virginia High School League. The school's mascot is the hawk and the school color is orange. Sports offered include:

- Cheerleading
- Cross country (boys and girls)
- Football
- Dance Team
- Field hockey
- Golf (boys and girls)
- Volleyball (boys and girls)
- Basketball (boys and girls)
- Gymnastics
- Indoor track (boys and girls)
- Swimming
- Wrestling
- Baseball
- Lacrosse (boys and girls)
- Soccer (boys and girls)
- Softball
- Outdoor track (boys and girls)
- Tennis (boys and girls)

== Notable alumni ==
- Murielle Ahouré-Demps, sprinter for Ivory Coast
- Larry Asante, former professional football player, Indianapolis Colts, Oakland Raiders, and Tampa Bay Buccaneers
- Matthew Ashford, actor, Jack Deveraux on Days of Our Lives
- Peter Baker, chief White House correspondent for The New York Times
- Mike D'Orso, narrative nonfiction writer
- Kenton Edelin, former professional basketball player, Indiana Pacers
- Margaret Fetterolf, murdered in 1976 while attending the school
- GoldLink, rapper
- Madison Hammond, professional soccer player, Angel City FC
- Tony Mayberry, former professional football player, Tampa Bay Buccaneers
- Swati Mohan, NASA engineer who landed Mars Perseverance Rover on Mars on February 18, 2021
- Jeffrey Overton Jr., college football running back for the Virginia Tech Hokies
- Jonahan Romero, former professional soccer player
- Lin Rountree, musician and record producer

== Facility ==
Hayfield's Rebecca S. Wilburn Auditorium is one of the largest auditoriums in Northern Virginia, and includes an orchestra pit elevator lift built into the front of the stage that allows that portion of the stage to act as either an orchestra pit or stage extension. Technical support for the Wilburn Auditorium is supported by a student organization, the Hayfield Audio and Lighting Technicians ("HALT").

=== Planetarium ===
Hayfield Secondary's Planetarium opened its doors in 1969. The main instrument of the planetarium is the Spitz A-4 projector. Many special effect projectors are also used to demonstrate certain astronomical and atmospheric phenomena, such as lunar and solar eclipses, different types of lightning, auroras, and the phasing of the moon. The planetarium is also equipped with three Kodak Ektograph projectors, and a slide dissolve system which is used to show previously produced slide programs and to create special slide programs on current astronomical topics. The most recent additions to the equipment list is a video projector and a special effects projector.
