= Tomas Rimac =

American football player (born 2003)

Columbus Aviators
- Position: Guard
- Roster status: Unsigned draft pick

Personal information
- Born: January 20, 2003 (age 23); Brunswick, Ohio, U.S.
- Listed height: 6 ft 6 in (1.98 m)
- Listed weight: 317 lb (144 kg)

Career information
- High school: Brunswick (Ohio)
- College: West Virginia (2021–2024); Virginia Tech (2025)
- NFL draft: 2026: undrafted

Career history
- Minnesota Vikings (2026)*; Columbus Aviators (2027-present)
- * Offseason or practice squad member only
- Stats at Pro Football Reference

Tomas Rimac (born January 20, 2003) is an American professional football guard. He played college football for the West Virginia Mountaineers and Virginia Tech Hokies. He was signed as an undrafted free agent by the Minnesota Vikings in 2026.

== Early life ==
Rimac is from Brunswick, Ohio. He attended Brunswick High School where he played football as an offensive lineman and participated in track and field, specializing in the shot put and discus throw. He earned Eagle Scout in 2021. Also in 2021, he was named the Medina County Gazette Senior Male Athlete of the Year, as well as the track and field MVP, after becoming the state champion in the discus throw and the runner-up in the shot put. He was also a two-time selection to the all-star team selected by the Gazette. He graduated from Brunswick in 2021. A three-star recruit and the fourth-best offensive lineman in the state, he committed to play college football for the West Virginia Mountaineers.

== College career ==
As a true freshman at West Virginia in 2021, Rimac redshirted and appeared in two games. He entered the 2022 season as a backup, but after an injury to James Gmiter, started the final five games of the season at left guard. He was named first-team Freshman All-American by The Athletic for his performance. He then started 11 games in the 2023 season and was named honorable mention All-Big 12 Conference. He remained starter in 2024 and was again named honorable mention all-conference, before announcing a transfer to the Virginia Tech Hokies for his final season in 2025.

== Professional career ==
Pre-draft measurables
Height	Weight	Arm length	Hand span	Wingspan	40-yard dash	10-yard split	20-yard split	20-yard shuttle	Three-cone drill	Vertical jump	Broad jump	Bench press
6 ft 5 7/8 in (1.98 m)	317 lb (144 kg)	34 3/8 in (0.87 m)	10 in (0.25 m)	6 ft 9 5/8 in (2.07 m)	4.95 s	1.66 s	2.75 s	4.59 s	7.69 s	30.5 in (0.77 m)	8 ft 10 in (2.69 m)	29 reps
All values from Pro Day

Rimac was signed as an undrafted free agent by the Minnesota Vikings after the conclusion of the 2026 NFL draft. On August 30, 2026, he was waived by the Vikings as part of the final roster cuts.
