= Battery Cheves =

- U.S. National Register of Historic Places
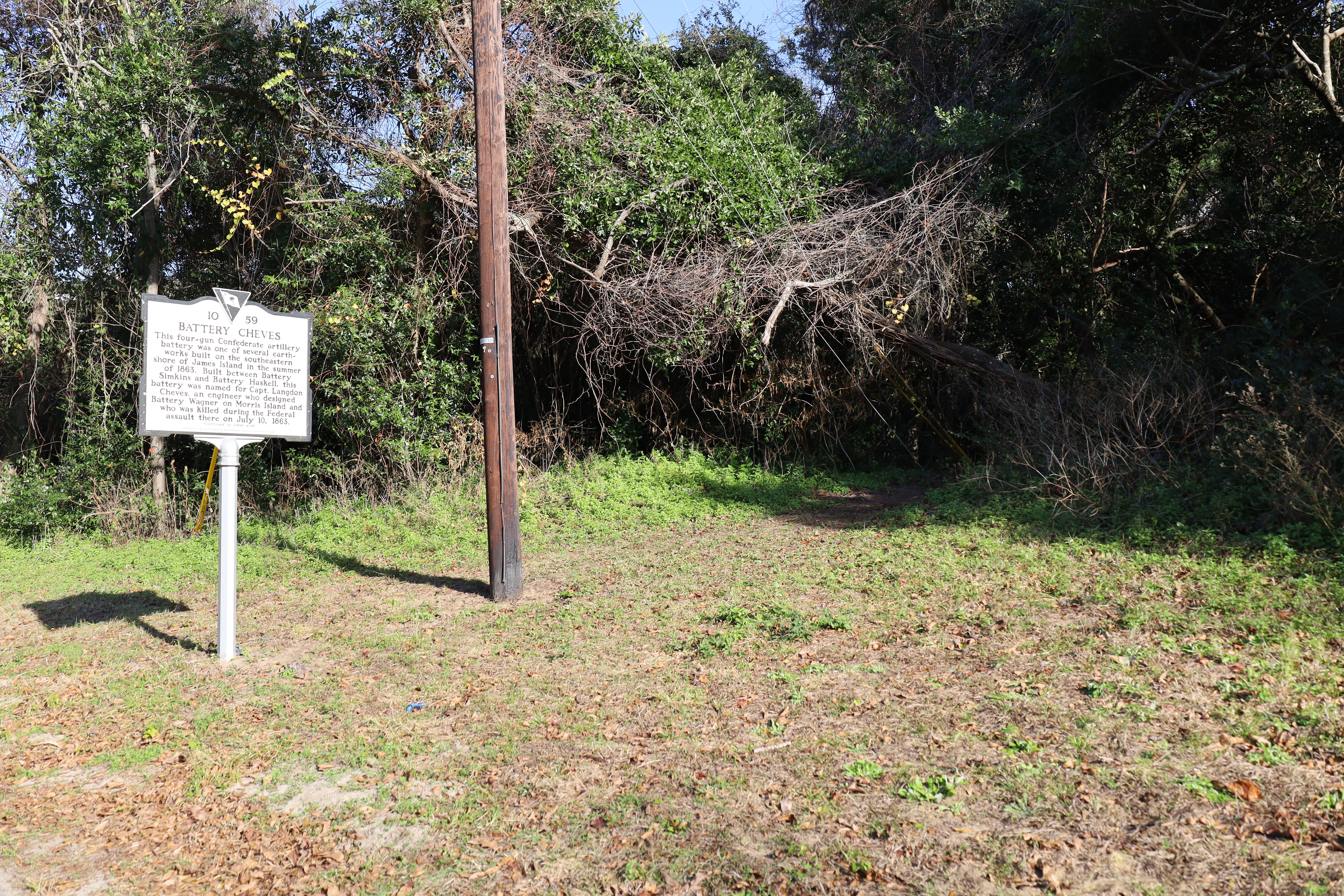
- Historic marker

- Location within South Carolina Location within the United States
- Location: James Island, Charleston, South Carolina
- Coordinates: 32°44′17″N 79°54′22″W
- Area: 1 acre (0.40 ha)
- Built: 1863
- MPS: Civil War Defenses of Charleston TR
- NRHP reference No.: 82003841
- Added to NRHP: August 11, 1982

Battery Cheves is a historic artillery battery located at James Island, Charleston, South Carolina. It was built in 1863, and designed to protect the area between Fort Johnson and Battery Haskell. At the end of the Civil War, this battery mounted two pieces of heavy artillery. The earthen redoubt measures approximately 280 feet (85 m) long and 240 feet (73 m) deep. It has a 12-foot-6-inch-high (3.81 m) parapet wall and a powder magazine about 15 feet (4.6 m) in height.

It was listed on the National Register of Historic Places in 1982.
