= Hayfield Farm Community =

Coordinates: 38°44′56″N 77°8′11″W

The Hayfield Farm Community of Alexandria, Virginia was developed in 1965 by Wills & Van Metre. Hayfield Farm is a subdivision of Fairfax County, Virginia, that has around 690 houses. It is surrounded by Huntley Meadows Park and wooded military facilities. North, adjacent to the community, is a U.S. Coast Guard station off Telegraph Road.

== History ==
Shortly after the Revolutionary War, in 1785, George Washington deeded 460 acres of his Dogue Run Farm to Lund Washington, a third cousin and the "faithful and trusted manager" of the General's Mount Vernon estate. The tract was named "Hayfield" and a brick dwelling house, completed in 1784 by Lund in anticipation of General Washington's return home, was the site's only substantial structure during Lund Washington's ownership. Upon his death, the farm was conveyed to Lund's widow, Elizabeth Foote. Thereafter, Hayfield was used by various owners as a school, cattle farm and residence.

Perhaps the most unusual feature of Hayfield was its Round Barn, built for William Clarke between 1874 and 1887. Clarke's "Big Red Barn" stood 100 feet high, 100 feet in diameter as a 16 sided double octagonal shaped barn. Damaged by a fire in 1892, Clarke quickly improved the building with an open circular threshing floor, a 250 ton silo at the center, and 200 steps leading to a cupola which topped the new roof. Farm manager J.H. Shertzer boasted that the enormous barn could store 400 tons of provender (hay) and that a wagon and team of six horses might drive around the inside with ease. The structure was indeed a "large and commodious barn" adorned with gutters, downspouts, and cast iron ornaments in which the initials "W.E.C" were the central design.

Lund Washington's brick house was destroyed by fire in 1917. Hayfield's second Round Barn outlasted successive changes in ownership until it too was lost in a fire on September 22, 1967. This information is on a plaque in Hayfield Park written by the Fairfax County Park Authority.

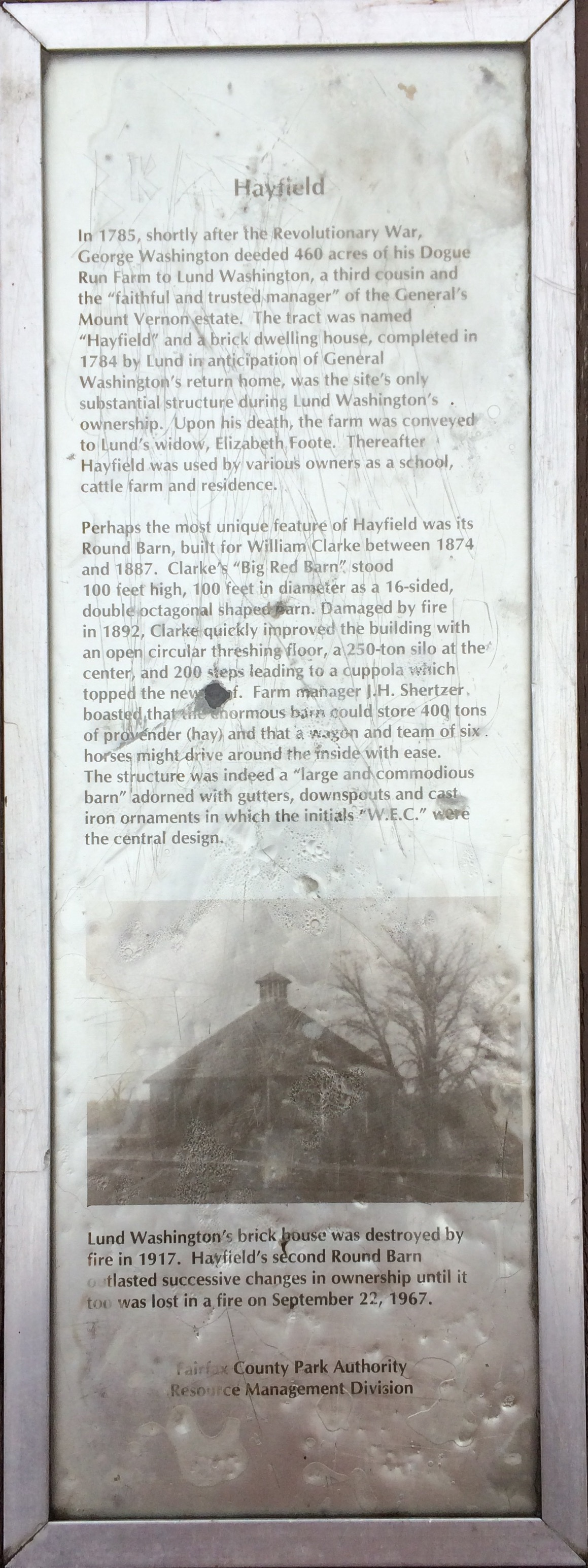
Plaque on display in Hayfield Park.

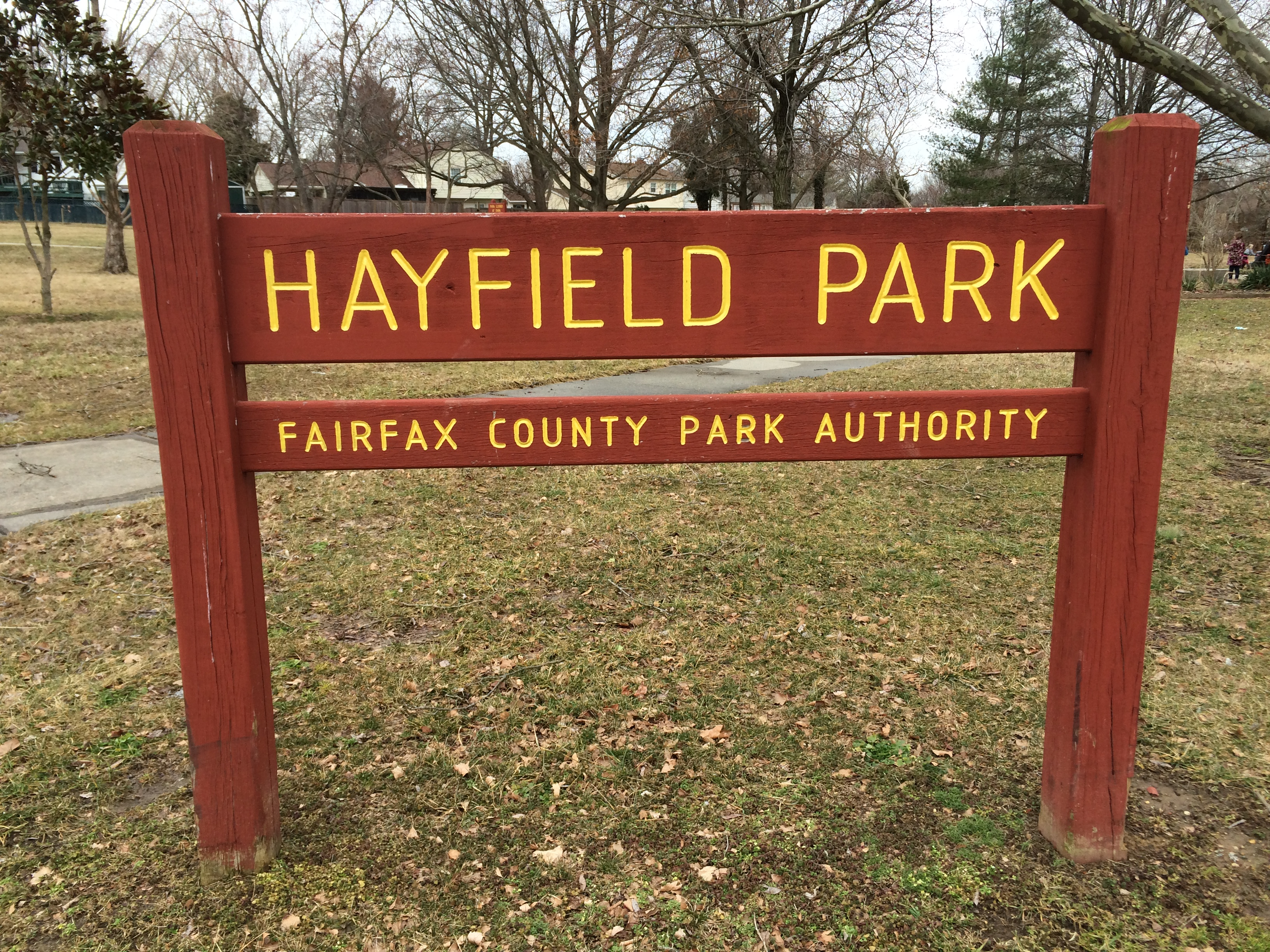
Sign located in Hayfield Park

== Schools ==
In 1967, Hayfield Elementary School opened then in 1969, the Hayfield Secondary School opened. Both of the schools are part of the Fairfax County Public Schools system. Both Schools share the mascot of a Hawk.
