= Jeffrey Overton Jr. =

American football player (born 2007)

No. 16 – Virginia Tech Hokies
- Position: Running back
- Class: Sophomore

Personal information
- Born: February 5, 2007 (age 19); Virginia, U.S.
- Listed height: 5 ft 9 in (1.75 m)
- Listed weight: 206 lb (93 kg)

Career information
- High school: Hayfield Secondary School (Alexandria, Virginia)
- College: Virginia Tech (2025–present)
- Stats at ESPN

Jeffrey Overton Jr. (born February 5, 2007) is an American college football running back for the Virginia Tech Hokies.

== Early life ==
Overton Jr. attended Freedom High School in Woodbridge, Virginia before transferring to Hayfield Secondary School in Alexandria, Virginia for his senior year. As a sophomore, he set the Prince William County single-season rushing record with 2,713 yards and 42 touchdowns. As a junior in 2023, Overton Jr. was the The Washington Post Fall All-Met Offensive Player of the Year, VHSL Class 6 All-State Offensive Player of the Year and Virginia Gatorade Football Player of the Year after rushing for 2,329 yards and 44 touchdowns. As a senior, he rushed for over 1,500 yards with 36 touchdowns. He committed to Virginia Tech to play college football.

== College career ==
Overton Jr. missed the first eight games of his freshman season at Virginia Tech in 2025. He returned for the final four games, making one start and rushing 25 times for 146 yards and a touchdown. Overton Jr. shared time with Marcellous Hawkins to open the 2026 season.
