= Brunswick Hills Township, Ohio =

Township in Ohio, US

- Township
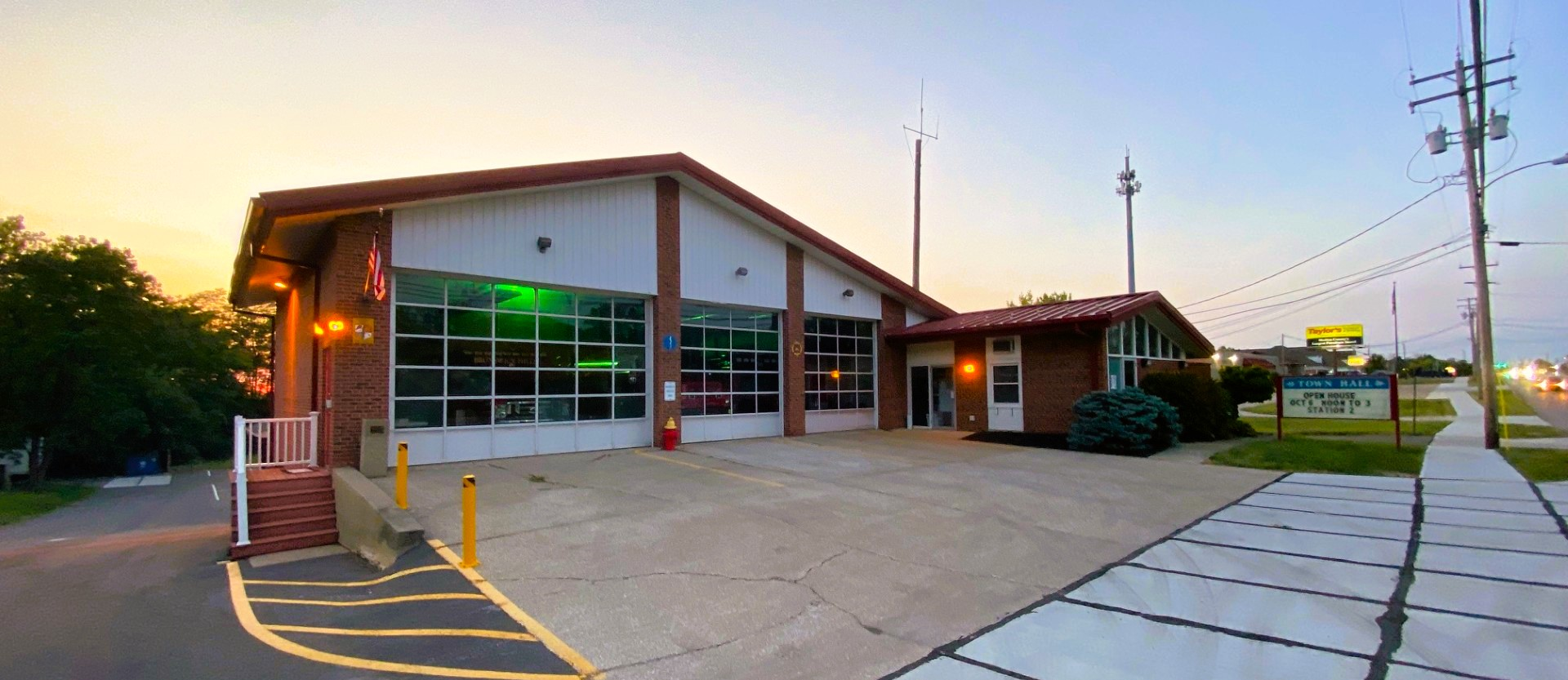
- Brunswick Hills Township Fire Department and Town Hall 1918 Pearl Rd., Brunswick, OH 44212

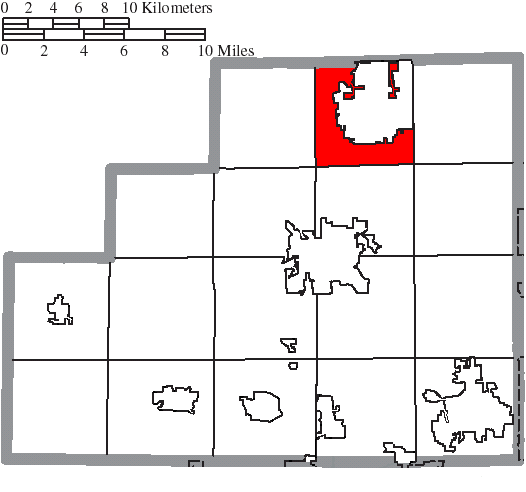
- Location of Brunswick Hills Township, Ohio
- Coordinates: 41°12′54.63″N 81°51′17.92″W
- Country: United States
- State: Ohio
- County: Medina
- City: Brunswick
- Established: 1818 (Brunswick Township)
- Established: 1960 (Brunswick Hills Township)

Government
  - Township Fiscal Officer: Linda Kuenzer
  - Township trustee: Christina Kusnerak; Trica Murphy; Ryan Nixon

Area
  - Total: 12.00 sq mi (31.08 km^{2})
  - Land: 12.00 sq mi (31.08 km^{2})
  - Water: 0 sq mi (0.00 km^{2})
- Elevation: 1,001 ft (305 m)

Population (2020)
  - Total: 11,196
  - Estimate (2023): 11,392
  - Density: 949/sq mi (366.6/km^{2})
- Time zone: UTC−5 (Eastern (EST))
  - Summer (DST): UTC−4 (CDT)
- ZIP Code: 44212
- Area codes: 330 and 234
- FIPS code: 39-09708
- GNIS feature ID: 1086590
- Website: brunswickhillstwp.org

Brunswick Hills Township is one of the seventeen townships of Medina County, Ohio, United States. The population was 11,196 at the 2020 census.

== History ==
Brunswick Hills Township was originally called Brunswick Township, and under the latter name was established in 1818. It was renamed Brunswick Hills Township in 1960. It is the only Brunswick Hills Township statewide.

== Geography ==
Brunswick is located at 41°12′54.63″N 81°51′17.92″W (41.2151763, -81.8549783),

According to the United States Census Bureau, the township has a total area of 12.00 square miles (31.08 km^{2}), all land.

Located in the northern part of the county, it borders the following townships and cities:

The city of Brunswick occupies the center and northeast of the township.

== Demographics ==
Historical population
Year	Pop.	±%
1818	167	—
1840	1,116	+568.3%
1850	1,417	+27.0%
1860	1,269	−10.4%
1870	980	−22.8%
1880	943	−3.8%
1960	1,085	+15.1%
1970	2,293	+111.3%
1980	3,324	+45.0%
1990	4,328	+30.2%
2000	5,469	+26.4%
2010	9,898	+81.0%
2020	11,196	+13.1%
2023 (est.)	11,392	+1.8%
U.S. Decennial Census; 2020 Census

The top five reported ancestries (people were allowed to report up to two ancestries, thus the figures will generally add to more than 100%) were English (92.2%), Spanish (0.5%), Indo-European (5.4%), Asian and Pacific Islander (1.5%), and Other (0.4%).

The median age in the city was 42.9 years.

=== 2020 census ===
Brunswick Hills Township, Ohio – racial and ethnic composition Note: the US Census treats Hispanic/Latino as an ethnic category. This table excludes Latinos from the racial categories and assigns them to a separate category. Hispanics/Latinos may be of any race.
Race / ethnicity (NH = non-Hispanic)	Pop. 2020	% 2020
White alone (NH)	10,025	89.5%
Black or African American alone (NH)		%
Native American or Alaska Native alone (NH)		%
Asian alone (NH)		%
Pacific Islander alone (NH)	0	0.0%
Other race alone (NH)		%
Mixed race or multiracial (NH)		%
Hispanic or Latino (any race)	365	3.3%
Total	11,196	100.0%

As of the 2020 census, there were 11,196 people, 4,375 households, and _ families residing in the township. The population density was _. There were 4,375 housing units at an average density of _. The racial makeup of the township was 90.5% White, 0.8% African American, 0.1% Native American, 2.1% Asian, 0.0% Pacific Islander, 0.9% from some other races and 5.6% from two or more races. Hispanic or Latino people of any race were 3.3% of the population.

== Government ==
The township is governed by a three-member board of trustees, who are elected in November of odd-numbered years to a four-year term beginning on the following January 1. Two are elected in the year after the presidential election and one is elected in the year before it. There is also an elected township fiscal officer, who serves a four-year term beginning on April 1 of the year after the election, which is held in November of the year before the presidential election. Vacancies in the fiscal officership or on the board of trustees are filled by the remaining trustees.
