= Brunswick, Ohio =

- City
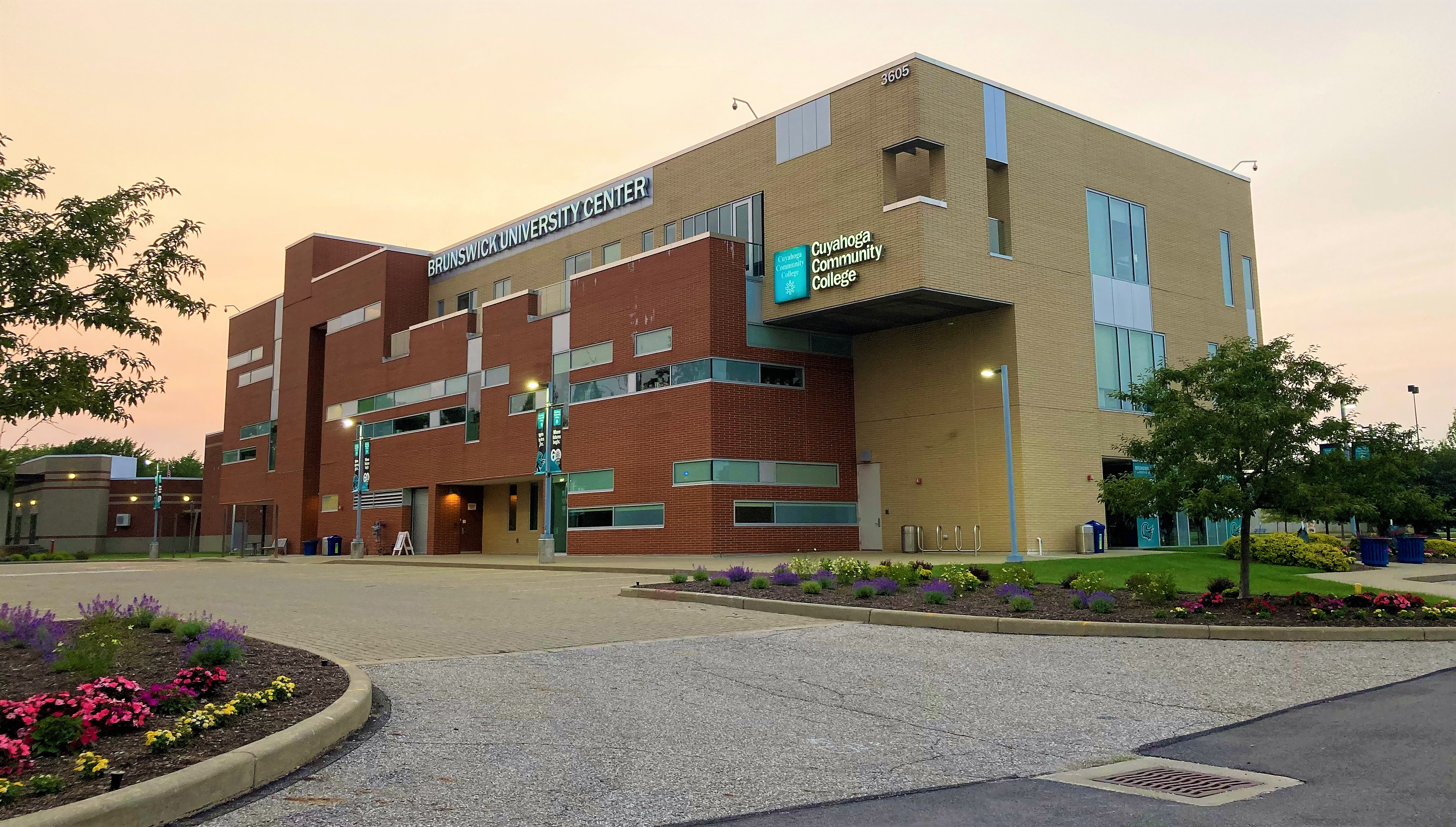
- Brunswick campus of Cuyahoga Community College

- Logo
- Interactive map of Brunswick, Ohio
- Location within Ohio Location within the United States
- Coordinates: 41°14′47.17″N 81°49′11.15″W
- Country: United States
- State: Ohio
- County: Medina
- Township: Brunswick Hills
- Founded: January 1, 1815
- Incorporated (village): February 1, 1960
- Incorporated (city): October 2, 1960

Government
  - Type: Council–manager
  - Mayor: Ron Falconi (R)
  - City manager: Carl DeForest

Area
  - Total: 13.031 sq mi (33.750 km^{2})
  - Land: 12.995 sq mi (33.657 km^{2})
  - Water: 0.036 sq mi (0.093 km^{2})
- Elevation: 1,106 ft (337 m)

Population (2020)
  - Total: 35,426
  - Estimate (2023): 35,072
  - Density: 2,698.8/sq mi (1,042.01/km^{2})
- Time zone: UTC−5 (Eastern (EST))
  - Summer (DST): UTC−4 (CDT)
- ZIP Code: 44212
- Area codes: 330 and 234
- FIPS code: 39-09680
- GNIS feature ID: 1086589
- Website: brunswick.oh.us

Brunswick (/ˈbrʌnzwɪk/ BRUN-zwik or /ˈbrʌnswɪk/ BRUN-swik) is the largest city in Medina County, Ohio, United States. The population was 35,426 at the 2020 census. It is approximately 20 miles (32 km) southwest of Cleveland and part of the Cleveland metropolitan area.

== History ==
Brunswick was founded on January 1, 1815, and was named randomly in a naming contest after Brunswick, Germany. It was incorporated as a village on February 1, 1960, and incorporated as a city on October 2, 1960.

== Geography ==
Brunswick is located at 41°14′47.17″N 81°49′11.15″W (41.2464362, -81.8197626),

According to the United States Census Bureau, the city has a total area of 13.031 square miles (33.75 km^{2}), of which, 12.995 square miles (33.66 km^{2}) is land and 0.036 square miles (0.09 km^{2}) is water.

== Demographics ==
Historical population
Census	Pop.	Note	%±
1960	11,725		—
1970	15,852		35.2%
1980	27,645		74.4%
1990	28,230		2.1%
2000	33,388		18.3%
2010	34,255		2.6%
2020	35,426		3.4%
2025 (est.)	35,114		−0.9%
U.S. Decennial Census; 2020 Census

The following subsections describe Brunswick's demographics as reported by the U.S. Census Bureau.

=== Racial and ethnic composition ===
Brunswick, Ohio – racial and ethnic composition Note: the US Census treats Hispanic/Latino as an ethnic category. This table excludes Latinos from the racial categories and assigns them to a separate category. Hispanics/Latinos may be of any race.
Race / ethnicity (NH = non-Hispanic)	Pop. 2000	Pop. 2010	Pop. 2020	% 2000	% 2010	% 2020
White alone (NH)	32,107	32,194	31,659	96.16%	93.98%	89.37%
Black or African American alone (NH)	244	417	540	0.73%	1.22%	1.52%
Native American or Alaska Native alone (NH)	33	41	33	0.10%	0.12%	0.09%
Asian alone (NH)	282	413	533	0.84%	1.21%	1.50%
Pacific Islander alone (NH)	6	6	2	0.02%	0.02%	0.01%
Other race alone (NH)	28	18	142	0.08%	0.05%	0.40%
Mixed race or multiracial (NH)	234	376	1,357	0.70%	1.10%	3.83%
Hispanic or Latino (any race)	454	790	1,160	1.36%	2.31%	3.27%
Total	33,388	34,255	35,426	100.00%	100.00%	100.00%

=== 2020 census ===
As of the 2020 census, there were 35,426 people, 14,187 households, and 9,702 families residing in the city. The population density was 2,733.5 inhabitants per square mile (1,055.4/km^{2}), and there were 14,714 housing units at an average density of 1,135.3 per square mile (438.3/km^{2}).

The median age was 41.5 years; 21.4% of residents were under the age of 18 and 18.0% were 65 years of age or older. For every 100 females there were 95.3 males, and for every 100 females age 18 and over there were 93.9 males age 18 and over.

There were 14,187 households in Brunswick, of which 29.5% had children under the age of 18 living in them. Of all households, 52.7% were married-couple households, 16.4% were households with a male householder and no spouse or partner present, and 24.5% were households with a female householder and no spouse or partner present. About 26.5% of all households were made up of individuals and 11.4% had someone living alone who was 65 years of age or older.

There were 14,714 housing units, of which 3.6% were vacant. Among occupied housing units, 76.3% were owner-occupied and 23.7% were renter-occupied. The homeowner vacancy rate was 0.6% and the rental vacancy rate was 6.8%.

100.0% of residents lived in urban areas, while 0% lived in rural areas.

Racial composition as of the 2020 census
Race	Number	Percent
White	32,055	90.5%
Black or African American	551	1.6%
American Indian and Alaska Native	46	0.1%
Asian	545	1.5%
Native Hawaiian and Other Pacific Islander	2	<0.1%
Some other race	347	1.0%
Two or more races	1,880	5.3%
Hispanic or Latino (of any race)	1,160	3.3%

=== American Community Survey ===
As of the 2023 American Community Survey, there are 14,482 estimated households in Brunswick with an average of 2.42 persons per household. The city has a median household income of $85,313. Approximately 6.1% of the city's population lives at or below the poverty line. Brunswick has an estimated 68.8% employment rate, with 28.7% of the population holding a bachelor's degree or higher and 93.8% holding a high school diploma.

The top five reported ancestries (people were allowed to report up to two ancestries, thus the figures will generally add to more than 100%) were English (95.7%), Spanish (1.1%), Indo-European (2.6%), Asian and Pacific Islander (0.2%), and Other (0.4%).

=== 2010 census ===
As of the 2010 census there were 34,255 people, 12,967 households, and 9,565 families living in the city. The population density was 2,652.2 inhabitants per square mile (1,024.0/km^{2}). There were 13,600 housing units at an average density of 1,052.6 per square mile (406.4/km^{2}). The racial makeup of the city was 95.48% White, 1.23% African American, 0.15% Native American, 1.23% Asian, 0.02% Pacific Islander, 0.60% from some other races and 1.30% from two or more races. Hispanic or Latino people of any race were 2.31% of the population.

Of the 12,967 households 36.2% had children under the age of 18 living with them, 58.3% were married couples living together, 10.6% had a female householder with no husband present, 4.9% had a male householder with no wife present, and 26.2% were non-families. 21.9% of households were one person and 7.5% were one person aged 65 or older. The average household size was 2.63 and the average family size was 3.07.

The median age was 39.1 years. 25.2% of residents were under the age of 18; 7.5% were between the ages of 18 and 24; 27% were from 25 to 44; 28.3% were from 45 to 64; and 11.9% were 65 or older. The gender makeup of the city was 49.1% male and 50.9% female.

=== 2000 census ===
As of the 2000 census there were 33,388 people, 11,883 households, and 9,280 families living in the city. The population density was 2,662.3 inhabitants per square mile (1,027.9/km^{2}). There were 12,251 housing units at an average density of 976.9 per square mile (377.2/km^{2}). The racial makeup of the city was 97.09% White, 0.74% African American, 0.13% Native American, 0.86% Asian, 0.02% Pacific Islander, 0.38% from some other races and 0.78% from two or more races. Hispanic or Latino people of any race were 1.36% of the population.

Of the 11,883 households 39.3% had children under the age of 18 living with them, 65.3% were married couples living together, 9.3% had a female householder with no husband present, and 21.9% were non-families. 17.7% of households were one person and 5.2% were one person aged 65 or older. The average household size was 2.79 and the average family size was 3.18.

The age distribution was 27.7% under the age of 18, 8.1% from 18 to 24, 32.7% from 25 to 44, 23.2% from 45 to 64, and 8.2% 65 or older. The median age was 35 years. For every 100 females, there were 96.5 males. For every 100 females age 18 and over, there were 94.4 males.

The median household income was $56,288 and the median family income was $62,080. Males had a median income of $42,675 versus $27,882 for females. The per capita income for the city was $21,937. About 3.2% of families and 4.6% of the population were below the poverty line, including 5.7% of those under age 18 and 5.0% of those age 65 or over.

== Education ==
Public education in Brunswick is administered by the Brunswick City School District, which operates six elementary schools, one middle school, and Brunswick High School. Other schools in the city include St. Ambrose School, a Roman Catholic parochial school serving Kindergarten through 8th grade.

Brunswick University Center opened in 2011 as an extension of Cuyahoga Community College’s Western Campus in Parma.

Brunswick's public library is a branch of Medina County District Library.

== Media ==
Brunswick is served by a daily newspaper, The Medina County Gazette which is published every day of the week except Sundays and a free weekly newspaper, The Brunswick Post which is published every Saturday. In addition, the Akron Beacon Journal and the Cleveland Plain Dealer occasionally cover the city and Medina County. Brunswick is served by numerous television and radio stations from both the Greater Cleveland, Greater Akron and Greater Canton areas.

== Notable people ==
- Dean Heil, former folkstyle wrestler, two-time NCAA wrestling champion at Oklahoma State
- Pete Kostelnick, ultramarathon runner
- Natalie Sideserf, cake artist, star of Texas Cake House
- Ricky Wysocki, professional disc golfer
