= Jacqueline Chevé =

French politician

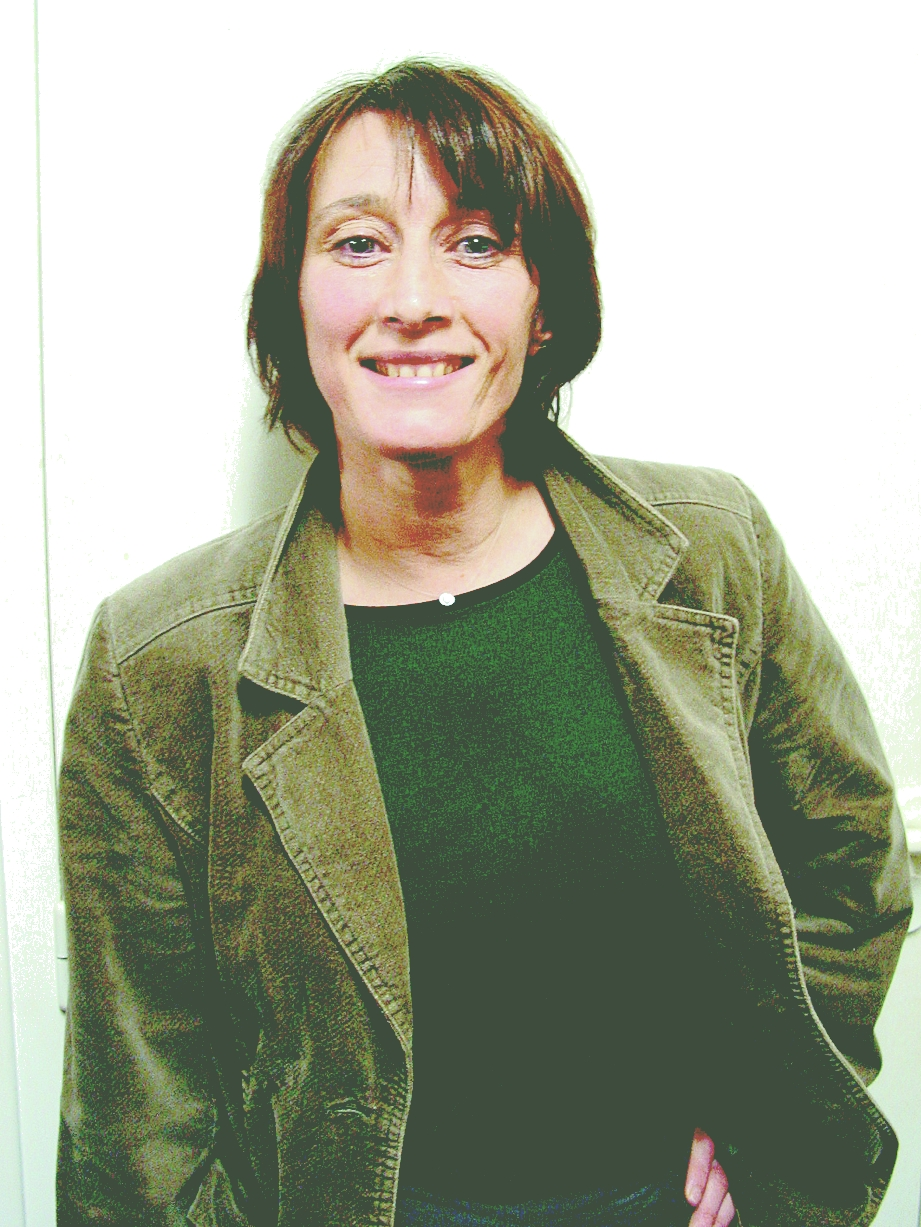
Jacqueline Chevé (2004)

Jacqueline Chevé was born on 21 August 1961 in Merdrignac (Côtes-du-Nord). She was a member of the Senate of France. She represented the Côtes-d'Armor department, and was a member of the Socialist Party. She died on 15 March 2010 in Paris.
